= List of Notre Dame Fighting Irish starting quarterbacks =

The following individuals have started games at quarterback for the University of Notre Dame football team, updated through the 2026 season.

The year of induction into the College Football Hall of Fame, if applicable, is designated alongside the respective player's final season.

Year	Name	Class	First career start	Number of starts	Record as starter	Awards/honors
2026	CJ Carr	Jr.		10	9–1	
2025	CJ Carr	So.	August 31	12	10–2	
2024	Riley Leonard	Sr.	August 31	16	14–2	
2023	Steve Angeli	So.	December 29	1	1–0	
2023	Sam Hartman	Sr.	August 26	12	9–3	
2022	Drew Pyne	Jr.	September 17	10	8–2	
2022	Tyler Buchner	So.	September 3	3	1–2	
2021	Jack Coan	Sr.	September 5	13	11–2	
2020	Ian Book	Sr.		12	10–2	
2019	Ian Book	Sr.		13	11–2	
2018	Brandon Wimbush	Sr.		4	4–0	
2018	Ian Book	Jr.		9	8–1	
2017	Brandon Wimbush	Jr.	September 2	12	9–3	
2017	Ian Book	So.	October 6	1	1–0	
2016	DeShone Kizer	So.		12	4–8	
2015	DeShone Kizer	Fr.	September 19	11	8–3	
2015	Malik Zaire	Jr.		2	2–0	
2014	Everett Golson	Sr.		12	7–5	
2014	Malik Zaire	So.	December 30	1	1–0	
2013	Tommy Rees	Sr.		13	9–4	
2012	Tommy Rees	Jr.		2	2–0	
2012	Everett Golson	So.	September 1	11	10–1	
2011	Tommy Rees	So.		12	8–4	
2011	Dayne Crist	Sr.		1	0–1	
2010	Tommy Rees	Fr.	November 13	4	4–0	
2010	Dayne Crist	Jr.	September 4	9	4–5	
2009	Jimmy Clausen	Jr.		12	6–6	AA
2008	Jimmy Clausen	So.		13	7–6	
2007	Evan Sharpley	Jr.	October 20	2	0–2	
2007	Jimmy Clausen	Fr.	September 8	9	3–6	
2007	Demetrius Jones	So.	September 1	1	0–1	
2006	Brady Quinn	Sr.		13	10–3	AA, Unitas, Maxwell
2005	Brady Quinn	Jr.		12	9–3	AA, Baugh
2004	Brady Quinn	So.		12	6–6	
2003	Brady Quinn	Fr.	September 27	9	4–5	
2003	Carlyle Holiday	Sr.		3	1–2	
2002	Pat Dillingham	So.	October 5	1	1–0	
2002	Carlyle Holiday	Jr.		12	9–3	
2001	Carlyle Holiday	So.	September 29	9	5–4	
2001	Matt LoVecchio	So.		2	0–2	
2000	Matt LoVecchio	Fr.	October 7	8	7–1	
2000	Gary Godsey	So.	September 16	2	1–1	
2000	Arnaz Battle	Jr.	September 2	2	1–1	
1999	Jarious Jackson	Sr.		12	5–7	
1998	Eric Chappell	Jr.	November 28	1	0–1	
1998	Jarious Jackson	Jr.	September 5	11	9–2	
1997	Ron Powlus	Sr.		13	7–6	
1996	Ron Powlus	Jr.		11	8–3	
1995	Tom Krug	Jr.	November 18	2	1–1	
1995	Ron Powlus	So.		10	8–2	
1994	Ron Powlus	Fr.	September 3	12	6–5–1	
1993	Paul Failla	Jr.		1	1–0	
1993	Kevin McDougal	Sr.	September 4	11	10–1	
1992	Rick Mirer	Sr.		12	10–1–1	AA
1991	Paul Failla	Fr.	September 28	1	1–0	
1991	Rick Mirer	Jr.		12	9–3	
1990	Rick Mirer	So.	September 15	12	9–3	
1989	Tony Rice	Sr.		13	12–1	AA, Unitas
1988	Tony Rice	Jr.		12	12–0	
1987	Kent Graham	Fr.	November 7	1	1–0	
1987	Tony Rice	So.	October 17	6	4–2	
1987	Terry Andrysiak	Sr.		5	3–2	
1986	Terry Andrysiak	Jr.		1	0–1	
1986	Steve Beuerlein	Sr.		10	5–5	
1985	Terry Andrysiak	So.	November 9	1	1–0	
1985	Steve Beuerlein	Jr.		10	4–6	
1984	Scott Grooms	Sr.	October 13	1	0–1	
1984	Steve Beuerlein	So.		11	7–4	
1983	Steve Beuerlein	Fr.	October 1	8	5–3	
1983	Blair Kiel	Sr.		4	2–2	
1982	Jim O'Hara	Sr.	November 20	1	0–1	
1982	Ken Karcher	So.	November 13	1	0–1	
1982	Blair Kiel	Jr.		9	6–2–1	
1981	Tim Koegel	Sr.		4	1–3	
1981	Blair Kiel	So.		7	4–3	
1980	Blair Kiel	Fr.	October 11	9	6–2–1	
1980	Mike Courey	Sr.		3	3–0	
1979	Mike Courey	Jr.	November 24	1	1–0	
1979	Tim Koegel	So.	September 22	1	0–1	
1979	Rusty Lisch	Sr.		9	6–3	
1978	Joe Montana	Sr.		12	9–3	
1977	Joe Montana	Jr.		10	10–0	
1977	Rusty Lisch	Jr.		2	1–1	
1976	Rusty Lisch	So.	November 20	2	1–1	
1976	Rick Slager	Sr.		10	8–2	
1975	Joe Montana	So.	October 4	3	1–2	
1975	Rick Slager	Jr.	September 15	8	7–1	
1974	Tom Clements	Sr.		12	10–2	AA
1973	Tom Clements	Jr.		11	11–0	
1972	Tom Clements	So.	September 23	11	8–3	
1971	Cliff Brown	So.	October 16	6	4–2	
1971	Bill Etter	Jr.	October 2	2	2–0	
1971	Pat Steenberge	Sr.	September 18	2	2–0	
1970	Joe Theismann	Sr.		11	10–1	AA, CFHOF (2003)
1969	Joe Theismann	Jr.		11	8–2–1	
1968	Joe Theismann	So.	November 9	3	2–0–1	
1968	Terry Hanratty	Sr.		7	5–2	AA
1967	Terry Hanratty	Jr.		10	8–2	Baugh
1966	Coley O'Brien	So.	November 26	1	1–0	
1966	Terry Hanratty	So.	September 24	9	8–0–1	AA
1965	Tom Schoen	So.	October 9	1	1–0	
1965	William J. Zloch	Sr.	September 18	9	6–2–1	
1964	John Huarte	Sr.		10	9–1	AA, Heisman, CFHOF (2005)
1963	Sandy Bonvechio	Jr.	November 16	2	0–2	
1963	Frank Budka	Sr.		5	2–3	
1963	John Huarte	Jr.	October 5	1	0–1	
1963	Denis Szot	Sr.		1	0–1	
1962	Denis Szot	Jr.	October 6	4	0–4	
1962	Daryle Lamonica	Sr.		6	5–1	AA
1961	Frank Budka	So.	November 11	4	2–2	
1961	Daryle Lamonica	Jr.		6	3–3	
1960	Daryle Lamonica	So.	November 12	3	1–2	
1960	George Haffner	Jr.	September 24	7	1–6	
1959	George Izo	Sr.		6	3–3	
1959	Don White	Sr.	September 26	4	2–2	
1958	George Izo	Jr.	November 1	5	3–2	
1958	Robert Williams	Sr.		5	3–2	
1957	Robert Williams	Jr.		10	7–3	
1956	Robert Williams	So.	December 1	1	0–1	
1956	Paul Hornung	Sr.		9	2–7	AA, Heisman, Harley, CFHOF (1985)
1955	Paul Hornung	Jr.	September 24	10	8–2	
1954	Tom Carey	Sr.				
1954	Ralph Guglielmi	Sr.				AA, CFHOF (2001)
1953	Ralph Guglielmi	Jr.				
1952	Tom Carey	So.				
1952	Ralph Guglielmi	So.				
1951	Ralph Guglielmi	Fr.				
1951	John Mazur	Sr.				
1950	John Mazur	Jr.				
1950	Bob Williams	Sr.				AA, CFHOF (1988)
1949	Bob Williams	Jr.				AA
1948	Frank Tripucka	Sr.				
1947	Johnny Lujack	Sr.				AA, Heisman, CFHOF (1960)
1946	Johnny Lujack	Jr.				AA
1945	Frank Dancewicz	Sr.				AA
1944	Frank Dancewicz	Jr.				
1943	Johnny Lujack	Fr.	November 6	4	3–1	
1943	Angelo Bertelli	Sr.		6	6–0	AA, Heisman, CFHOF (1972)
1942	Angelo Bertelli	Jr.				AA
1941	Angelo Bertelli	So.				
1941	Harry Wright	Jr.				
1940	Bob Hargrave	Jr.				
1939	Steve Sitko	Sr.				
1938	Steve Sitko	Jr.				
1937	Andy Puplis	Sr.				
1936	Andy Puplis	Jr.				
1935	Wally Fromhart	Sr.				
1934	Wally Fromhart	Jr.				
1934	Bud Bonar	Sr.				
1933	Bud Bonar	Jr.				
1932	Chuck Jaskwhich	Sr.				
1931	Chuck Jaskwhich	Jr.				
1930	Frank Carideo	Sr.	October 4	10	10–0	AA, CFHOF (1954)
1929	Frank Carideo	Jr.				AA
1928	Frank Carideo	So.				
1928	Jim Brady	Sr.				
1927	Jim Brady	Jr.				
1927	Chuck Riley	Sr.				
1926	Chuck Riley	Jr.				
1926	Red Edwards	Sr.				
1925	Albert Cullen					
1925	Red Edwards	Jr.				
1924	Red Edwards	So.				
1924	Harry Stuhldreher	Sr.				AA, CFHOF (1958)
1923	Harry Stuhldreher	Jr.	September 30	10	9–1	
1922	Harry Stuhldreher	So.				
1922	Frank Thomas	Sr.				CFHOF (1951)
1921	Chet Grant	Sr.	September 24	11	10–1	
1920	Joe Brandy	Sr.	October 2	9	9–0	
1919	Leonard Bahan	Sr.	October 4	9	9–0	
1918	Bill Mohn	Sr.	September 28	6	3–1–2	
1917	Bill Allison	Jr.	October 27			
1917	James Phelan	Sr.				CFHOF (1973)
1916	James Phelan	Jr.	September 30	9	8–1	
1915	James Phelan	So.	October 2	8	7–1	
1914	Alfred Bergman	Sr.	October 3	8	6–2	
1913	Gus Dorais	Sr.	October 4	7	7–0	AA, CFHOF (1954)
1912	Gus Dorais	Jr.	October 5	7	7–0	
1911	Gus Dorais	So.	October 7	8	6–0–2	
1910	Gus Dorais	Fr.	October 8	6	4–1–1	
1909	Don Hamilton	So.	October 9	8	7–0–1	
1908	Don Hamilton	Fr.	October 3	9	8–1	
1907	Billy Ryan	Fr.	October 12	7	6–0–1	
1906	Bob Bracken	Sr.	October 6	7	6–1	
1905	Nate Silver	Sr.	September 30	9	5–4	
1904	Dick Coad	Fr.	October 27	1	1–0	
1904	Nate Silver	Jr.	October 1	7	4–3	
1903	Nate Silver	So.	October 3	9	8–0–1	
1902	Henry J. McGlew	Jr.	September 27	9	6–2–1	
1901	Henry J. McGlew	So.	September 28	10	8–1–1	
1900	Clarence Diebold	Fr.	September 29	10	6–3–1	
1899	Angus Daniel McDonald	Sr.	September 27	10	8–1–1	
1898	Charles Fleming	Jr.	October 8	6	4–2	
1897	Fred Waters	Fr.	October 13	6	4–1–1	
1896	Frank E. Hering	Jr.	October 8	7	4–3	
1895	William A. Walsh	Sr.	October 19	4	3–1	
1894	Nicholas Dinkel	Sr.	October 13	5	3–1–1	
1893	Charles Zeitler	Jr.	October 25	5	4–1	
1892	Pat Coady	Sr.	October 19	2	1–0–1	
1889	Ed Coady	Sr.		1	1–0	
1888	Ed Coady	Jr.	December 6	1	1–0	
1888	Joe Cusack	Jr.	April 20	2	0–2	
1887	George Cartier	So.	November 23	1	0–1	

== Win–loss records ==
Quarterbacks who have started for Notre Dame from 1972 through 2025. A player is credited with a win if he started the game and the team won that game, no matter if the player was injured or permanently removed on the second play from scrimmage.

Quarterback	Jersey No.	Games started	Wins	Losses	Ties	Winning pct.
CJ Carr	13	12	10	2	0	.833
Riley Leonard	13	16	14	2	0	.875
Steve Angeli	18	1	1	0	0	1.000
Sam Hartman	10	12	9	3	0	.750
Drew Pyne	10	10	8	2	0	.800
Tyler Buchner	12	3	1	2	0	.333
Jack Coan	17	13	11	2	0	.846
Ian Book	12	35	30	5	0	.857
Brandon Wimbush	7	16	13	3	0	.813
DeShone Kizer	14	23	12	11	0	.521
Malik Zaire	8	2	2	0	0	1.000
Everett Golson	5	19	17	6	0	.739
Tommy Rees	11, 13	31	23	8	0	.742
Dayne Crist	10	10	4	6	0	.400
Jimmy Clausen	7	34	16	18	0	.471
Evan Sharpley	13	2	0	2	0	.000
Demetrius Jones	3	1	0	1	0	.000
Brady Quinn	10	46	29	17	0	.630
Carlyle Holiday	7	24	15	9	0	.625
Pat Dillingham	9	1	1	0	0	1.000
Matt LoVecchio	10	10	7	3	0	.700
Gary Godsey	14	2	1	1	0	.500
Arnaz Battle	3	2	1	1	0	.500
Jarious Jackson	7	23	14	9	0	.609
Eric Chappell	8	1	0	1	0	.000
Ron Powlus	3	46	29	16	1	.641
Tom Krug	11	2	1	1	0	.500
Paul Failla	5	2	2	0	0	1.000
Kevin McDougal	15	11	10	1	0	.909
Rick Mirer	3	36	28	7	1	.792
Tony Rice	9	31	28	3	0	.903
Kent Graham	17	1	1	0	0	1.000
Terry Andrysiak	2	7	4	3	0	.571
Steve Beuerlein	7	39	21	18	0	.537
Scott Grooms	10	1	0	1	0	.000
Blair Kiel	5	29	18	9	2	.638
Jim O'Hara	6	1	0	1	0	.000
Ken Karcher	12	1	0	1	0	.000
Tim Koegel	14	5	1	4	0	.200
Mike Courey	2	4	4	0	0	1.000
Rusty Lisch	6	13	8	5	0	.615
Joe Montana	3	25	20	5	0	.800
Rick Slager	11	18	15	3	0	.833
Tom Clements	2	34	29	5	0	.853

== Most starts ==
These quarterbacks have the 25 or more starts for Notre Dame since 1960.

	Name	Period	Starts	Wins	Losses	Ties	Win %
1	Ron Powlus	1994–1997	46	29	16	1	.641
1	Brady Quinn	2003–2006	46	29	17	0	.630
3	Steve Beuerlein	1983–1986	39	21	18	0	.537
4	Rick Mirer	1990–1992	36	28	7	1	.792
5	Ian Book	2017–2020	35	30	5	0	.857
6	Tom Clements	1972–1974	34	29	5	0	.853
6	Jimmy Clausen	2007–2009	34	16	18	0	.471
8	Tony Rice	1987–1989	31	28	3	0	.903
8	Tommy Rees	2010–2013	31	23	8	0	.742
10	Blair Kiel	1980–1983	29	18	9	2	.655
11	Terry Hanratty	1966–1968	26	21	4	1	.827
12	Joe Theismann	1968–1970	25	20	3	2	.840
12	Joe Montana	1975–1978	25	20	5	0	.800
