= List of University of Notre Dame athletes =

This list of University of Notre Dame athletes includes graduates, non-graduate former students, and current students of Notre Dame who are notable for their achievements within athletics, sometimes before or after their time at Notre Dame. Other alumni can be found in the list of University of Notre Dame alumni.

Although Notre Dame is highly ranked academically, it has also been called a "jock school" as it has produced a large number of athletes. Intercollegiate sports teams at Notre Dame are called the "Fighting Irish". Notre Dame offers 13 varsity sports for both men and women: men's American football, men's baseball, men's and women's basketball, men's and women's cross country, men's and women's fencing, men's and women's golf, men's ice hockey, men's and women's lacrosse, women's rowing, men's and women's soccer, women's softball, men's and women's swimming and diving, men's and women's tennis, men's and women's track and field, and women's volleyball. Approximately 400 students have gone on to play professional American football in the National Football League, the American Football League, or the All-America Football Conference, with many others going to play other sports professionally. Some athletes have also participated in the Olympic Games.

== American football ==
Jeff Alm

James Farragher

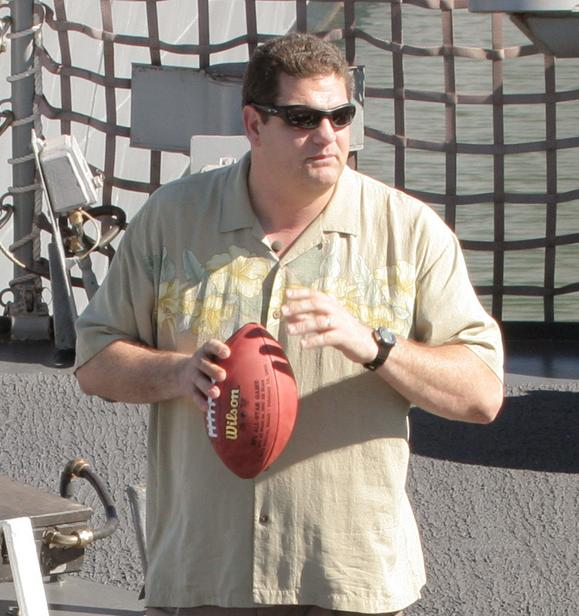
Mike Golic

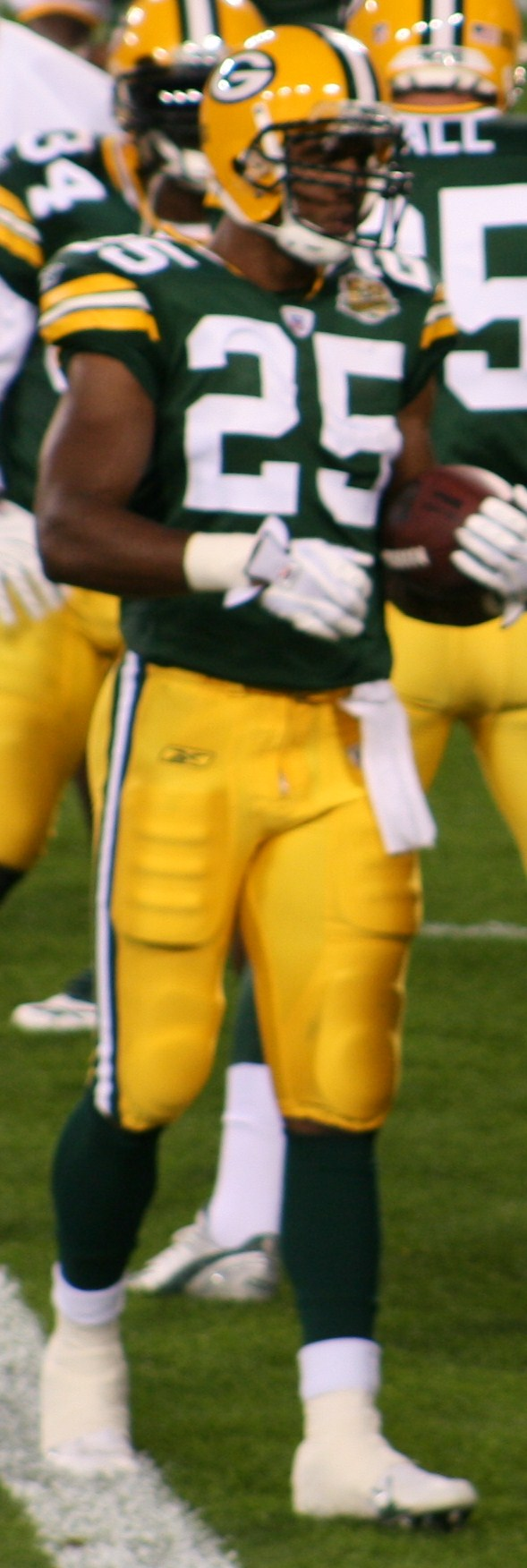
Ryan Grant

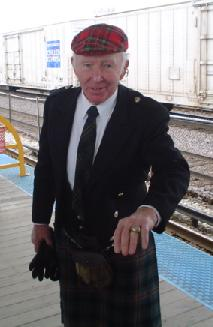
Johnny Lattner

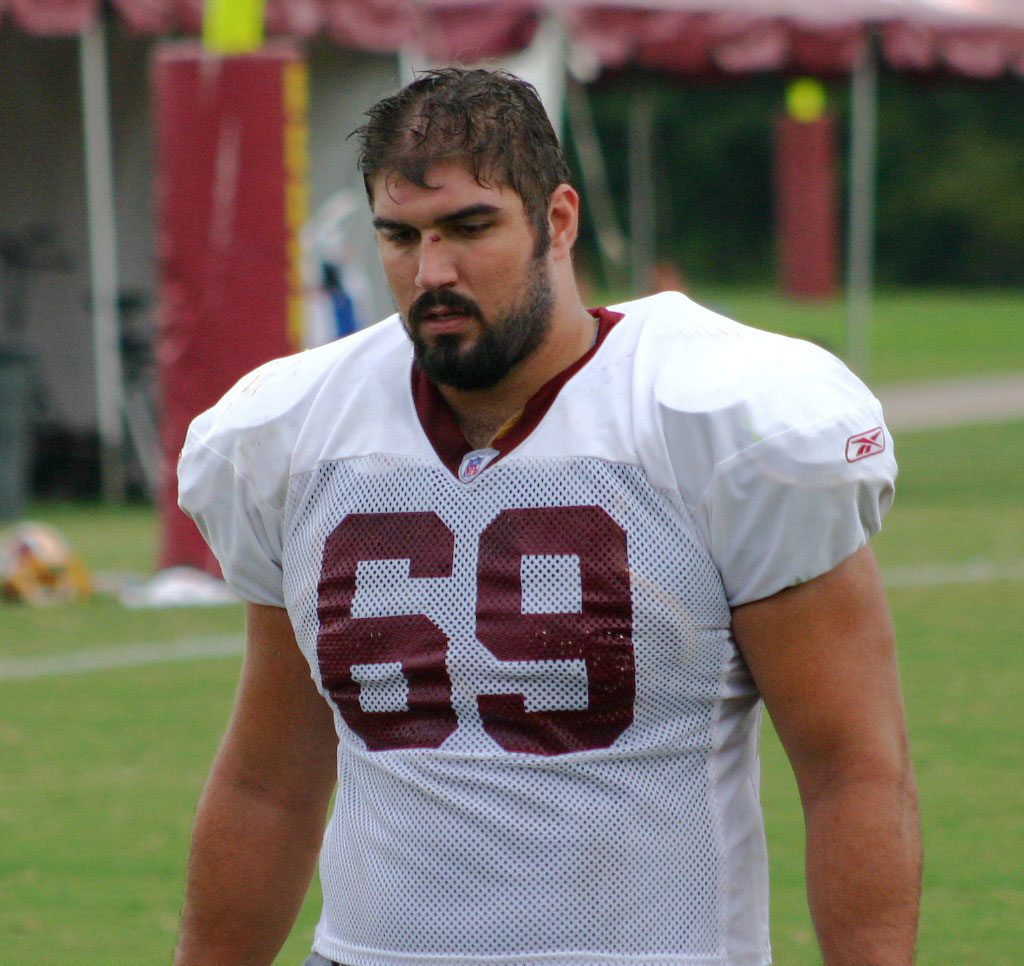
Jim Molinaro

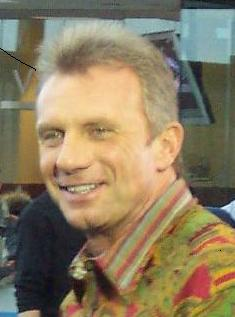
Joe Montana

Geoff Price

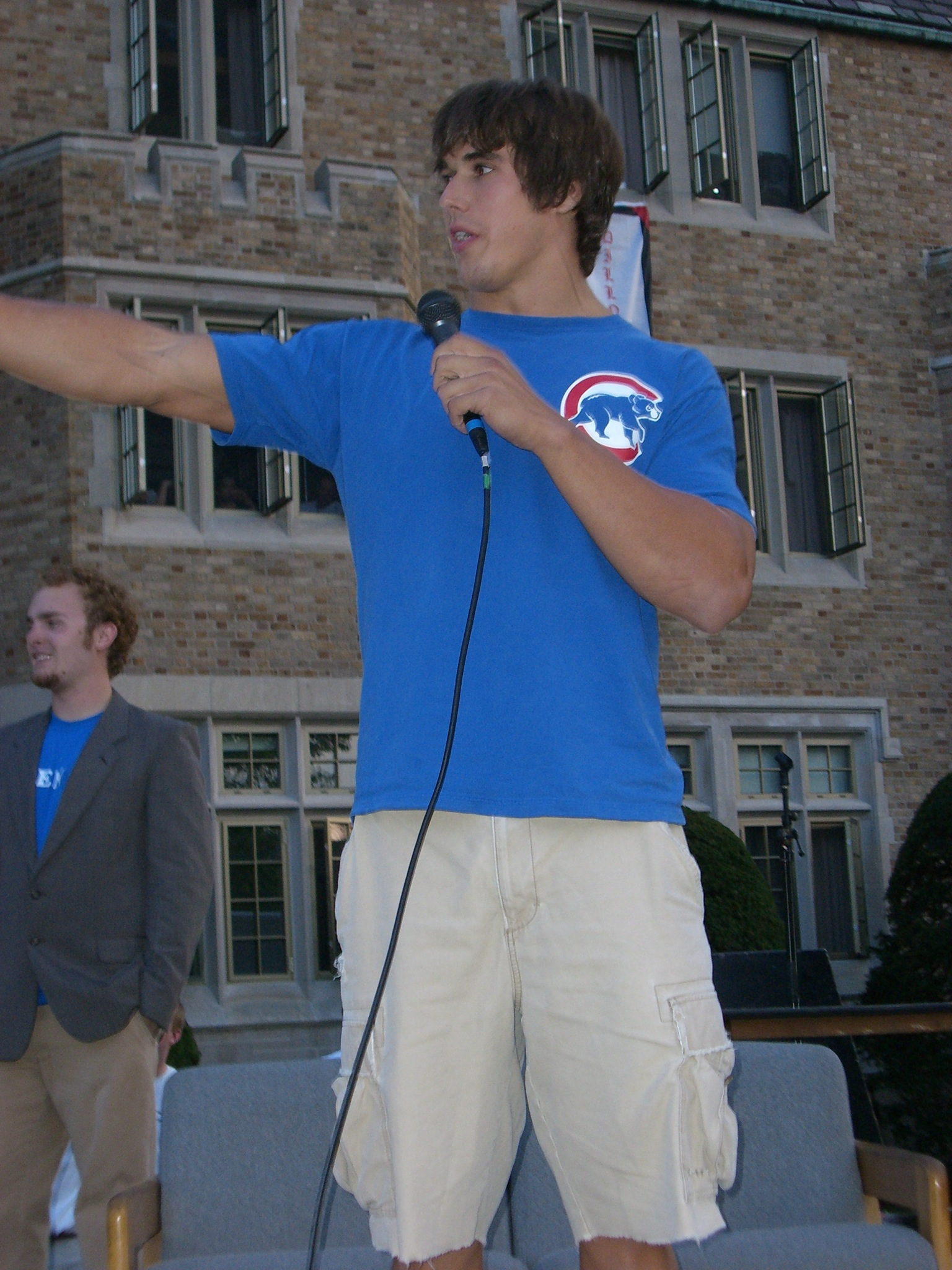
Brady Quinn

Louis J. Salmon

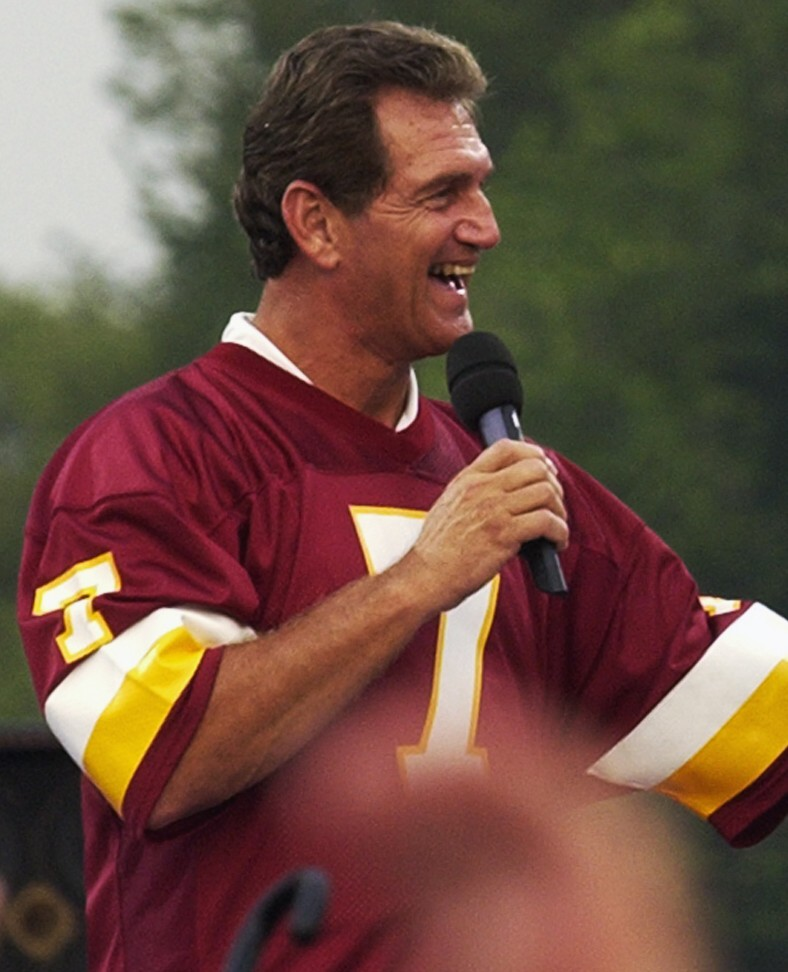
Joe Theismann

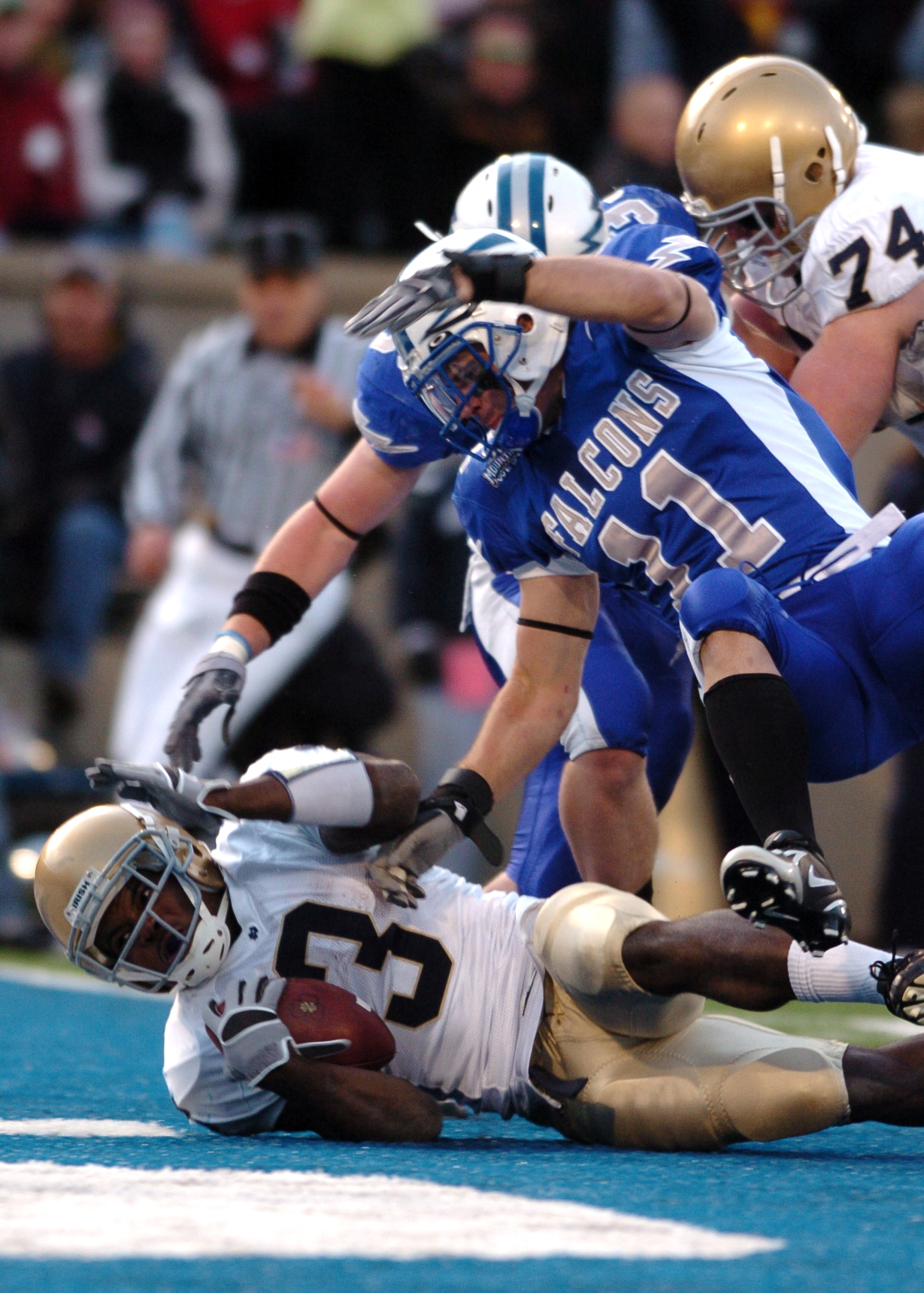
Darius Walker

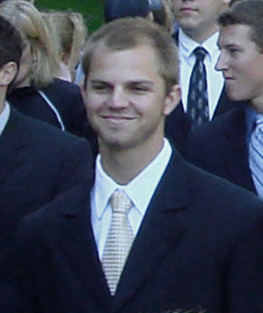
Jimmy Clausen

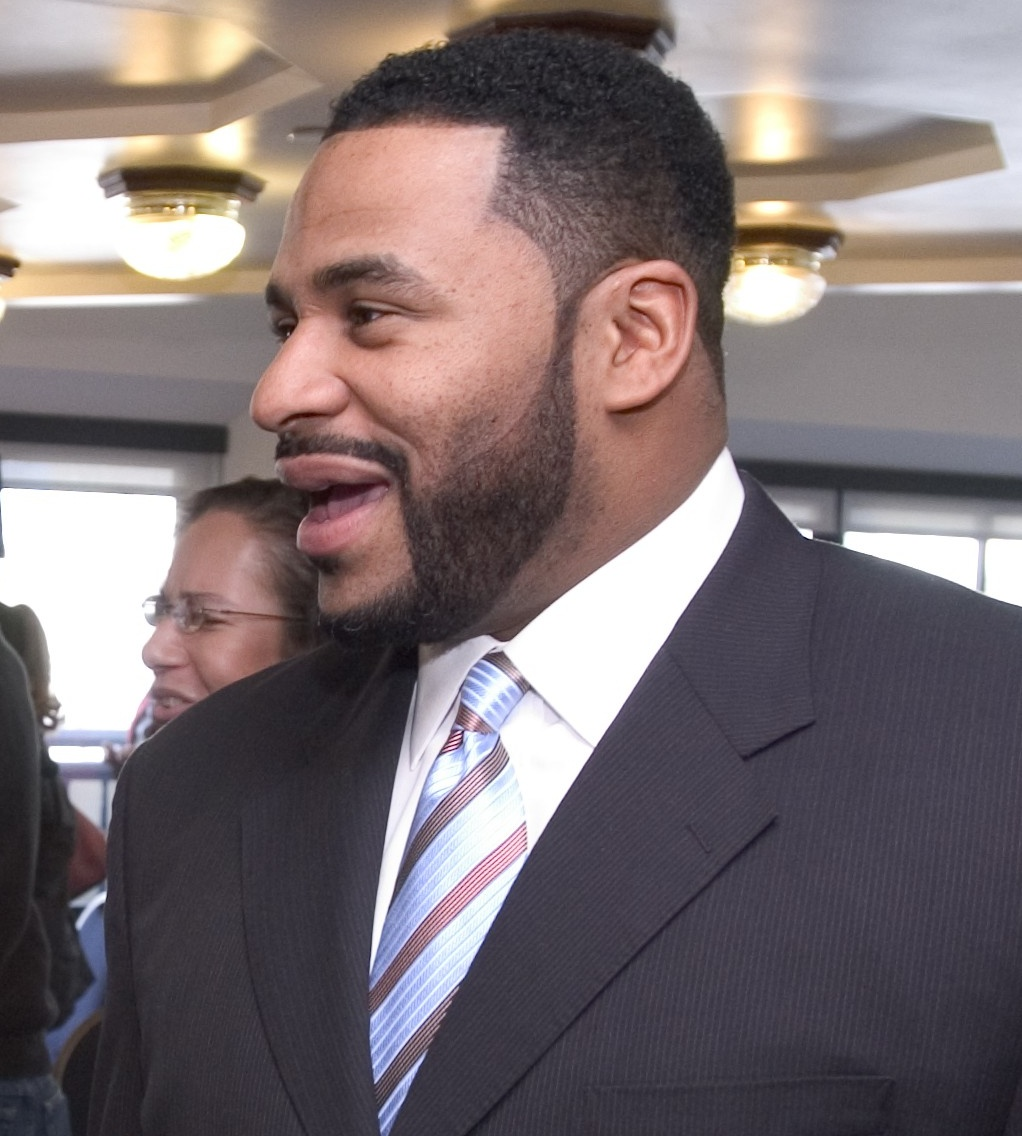
Jerome Bettis

| Name | Class year | Notability | Reference(s) |
|---|---|---|---|
| John Adams | 1944 | Offensive lineman at Notre Dame and for the Washington Redskins | |
| Ken Adamson | 1960 | Offensive guard at Notre Dame and for the Denver Broncos | |
| Jeff Alm | 1990 | Defensive tackle at Notre Dame and for the Houston Oilers | |
| Eddie Anderson | 1921 | All-American at Notre Dame and College Football Hall of Fame coach for multiple schools | |
| Heartley Anderson | 1921 | Hall of Fame offensive guard at Notre Dame and in the National Football League (NFL) | |
| Elmer Angsman | | Running back at Notre Dame and for the Chicago Cardinals | |
| Russell "Pete" Ashbaugh | 1947 | Player at Notre Dame and for the Chicago Rockets | |
| Joe Bach | 1924 | Defensive lineman at Notre Dame and coach of the Pittsburgh Steelers | |
| Charlie Bachman | Did not graduate | All-American guard at Notre Dame for three years and Hall of Fame coach for Kansas State, Florida and Michigan State | |
| Steve Bagarus | | Running back at Notre Dame and in the NFL | |
| Leonard (Pete) Bahan | 1919 | Quarterback, basketball center, and track athlete at Notre Dame and professionally in the NFL | |
| Arnaz Battle | 2003 | Quarterback and wide receiver at Notre Dame and receiver for the San Francisco 49ers | |
| Harry Baujan | 1916 | Player at Notre Dame and professionally and Hall of Fame coach at the University of Dayton | |
| Mark Bavaro | 1985 | Tight end at Notre Dame and in the NFL | |
| Ed Beinor | | Offensive lineman at Notre Dame and in the NFL | |
| Greg Bell | 1983 | Running back at Notre Dame and in the NFL | |
| Pete Bercich | 1993 | Linebacker at Notre Dame and for the Minnesota Vikings | |
| Bertrand Berry | 1997 | Defensive end at Notre Dame and in the NFL | |
| Angelo Bertelli | Did not graduate | Heisman Trophy-winning quarterback at Notre Dame and in the NFL | |
| Jerome Bettis | 1993 | Running back at Notre Dame and for the Pittsburgh Steelers | |
| Steve Beuerlein | 1987 | Quarterback at Notre Dame and in the NFL | |
| Jordan Black | 2003 | Offensive tackle at Notre Dame and in the NFL | |
| Rocky Bleier | 1968 | Fullback at Notre Dame and for the Pittsburgh Steelers | |
| Rocky Boiman | 1998 | Linebacker at Notre Dame and in the NFL | |
| Bud Bonar | | Quarterback at Notre Dame | |
| Luther Bradley | 1978 | Cornerback at Notre Dame and for the Detroit Lions | |
| Jim Brady | 1929 | Quarterback at Notre Dame and broadcasting entrepreneur | |
| Joe Brandy | 1920 | Quarterback at Notre Dame and collegiate and NFL coach | |
| Terry Brennan | 1949 | Halfback at Notre Dame and later Notre Dame's coach | |
| Reggie Brooks | 1999 | All-American running back at Notre Dame and in the NFL | |
| Cliff Brown | 1974 | Quarterback at Notre Dame and for the Philadelphia Eagles | |
| Earl Brown | | Football and basketball player at Notre Dame and collegiate head coach | |
| Tim Brown | 1988 | Walter Camp Award-winning, Heisman Trophy-winning wide receiver at Notre Dame and in the NFL, most notably with the Oakland Raiders | |
| Ross Browner | 1978 | Outland Trophy-winning Hall of Fame defensive end at Notre Dame and in the NFL | |
| Junior Bryant | 1993 | Defensive lineman at Notre Dame and with the San Francisco 49ers | |
| Frank Budka | | Quarterback at Notre Dame and safety with the Los Angeles Rams | |
| Nick Buoniconti | 1962 | Defensive tackle at Notre Dame and Hall of Fame linebacker in the NFL | |
| Jeff Burris | 1994 | Cornerback at Notre Dame and in the NFL | |
| Darrell Campbell | 2003 | Defensive tackle at Notre Dame | |
| Jack Cannon | | Hall of Fame guard at Notre Dame | |
| Frank Carideo | | Hall of Fame quarterback at Notre Dame and collegiate coach | |
| John Carlson | 2007 | Tight end at Notre Dame | |
| John Carney | | Placekicker at Notre Dame and in the NFL | |
| Joe Carollo | | Offensive tackle at Notre Dame and in the NFL | |
| Rob Carpenter | Did not graduate | Wide receiver at Notre Dame and later Syracuse and in the NFL | |
| Tom Carter | 1993 | Cornerback at Notre Dame and in the NFL | |
| George Cartier | | Quarterback in Notre Dame's first football game | |
| Dave Casper | 1974 | All-American tight end at Notre Dame and Pro Football Hall of Fame member from the NFL | |
| Jack Chevigny | | Halfback at Notre Dame who scored the winning touchdown in the famous "Win One for the Gipper" game | |
| Jimmy Clausen | 2010 | Quarterback at Notre Dame and with the Carolina Panthers | |
| Tom Clements | 1975 | Quarterback at Notre Dame and in the Canadian Football League (CFL) and assistant coach in the NFL | |
| Greg Collins | | Linebacker at Notre Dame and in the NFL | |
| Jerome Collins | 2005 | Tight end at Notre Dame and in the NFL | |
| George Connor | 1947 | All-American, Outland Trophy-winning, College Football Hall of Fame lineman at Notre Dame and Pro Football Hall of Fame member in the NFL | |
| Ed Cook | | Offensive lineman at Notre Dame and in the NFL | |
| James Cook | | Guard at Notre Dame and in the NFL | |
| Deke Cooper | 2000 | Safety at Notre Dame and in the NFL | |
| Paul Costa | Did not graduate | Tight end at Notre Dame and in the NFL | |
| Mike Courey | 1981 | Quarterback at Notre Dame | |
| Dick Coury | 1951 | Quarterback at Notre Dame and coach in the United States Football League (USFL) and collegiately | |
| Larry Coutre | | Halfback at Notre Dame and in the NFL | |
| Gerard Cowhig | | NFL player | |
| Bob Crable | 1982 | All-American linebacker for Notre Dame and the New York Jets | |
| Jim Crotty | | Cornerback at Notre Dame and in the NFL | |
| Clem Crowe | 1926 | Football and basketball player at Notre Dame and collegiate coach in both sports | |
| Jim Crowley | 1925 | College Football Hall of Fame halfback at Notre Dame best known as on the "Four Horsemen", player in the NFL, and collegiate head coach | |
| Maurice Crum | 2008 | Linebacker at Notre Dame, 2-time captain | |
| Rodney Culver | 1992 | Running back at Notre Dame and in the NFL | |
| Derek Curry | 2005 | Linebacker at Notre Dame | |
| Brennan Curtin | 2003 | Offensive tackle at Notre Dame and in the NFL | |
| Zygmont Czarobski | 1948 | Hall of Fame lineman at Notre Dame | |
| Bob Dahl | | Guard at Notre Dame and in the NFL | |
| Frank Dancewicz | 1946 | Quarterback at Notre Dame and with the Boston Yanks | |
| Mike Davlin | Did not graduate | Offensive tackle at Notre Dame and later at the University of San Francisco and with the Washington Redskins | |
| Lake Dawson | 1994 | Wide receiver at Notre Dame and for the Kansas City Chiefs and director of pro personnel for the Tennessee Titans | |
| Anthony Denman | 2000 | Linebacker at Notre Dame and in the NFL | |
| Autry Denson | 1999 | Running back at Notre Dame and in the NFL and has the most career rushing yards ever at Notre Dame | |
| Hugh Devore | 1934 | End at Notre Dame and football coach for Notre Dame twice, the University of Dayton, and the Philadelphia Eagles | |
| Sam Dolan | 1910 | Player at Notre Dame and head coach at Oregon State | |
| Gus Dorais | 1914 | Quarterback at Notre Dame and Hall of Fame coach at the collegiate level | |
| Eric Dorsey | 1986 | Defensive end at Notre Dame and for the New York Giants | |
| Bob Dove | 1943 | All-American, College Football Hall of Fame defensive lineman at Notre Dame and in the NFL and collegiate and professional coach | |
| Demetrius DuBose | 1993 | Linebacker at Notre Dame and in the NFL | |
| Dave Duerson | 1983 | All-American safety at Notre Dame and in the NFL | |
| Vontez Duff | 2004 | Cornerback and kick returner at Notre Dame | |
| Pete Duranko | 1967 | Defensive end at Notre Dame and for the Denver Broncos | |
| Glenn Earl | 2004 | Wide receiver and safety at Notre Dame and safety with the Houston Texans | |
| Nick Eddy | | All-American halfback at Notre Dame and for the Detroit Lions | |
| Gene (Red) Edwards | 1927 | Quarterback at Notre Dame | |
| Marc Edwards | 1997 | Fullback at Notre Dame and in the NFL | |
| Ray Eichenlaub | 1915 | Hall of Fame fullback at Notre Dame | |
| Tyler Eifert | 2013 | Tight end at Notre Dame and for the Cincinnati Bengals | |
| Clarence Ellis | 1972 | All-American safety at Notre Dame and with the Atlanta Falcons | |
| Bill Etter | 1972 | Quarterback at Notre Dame and in the CFL | |
| Paul Failla | Did not graduate | Quarterback and baseball player at Notre Dame and professional baseball and football player | |
| Jeff Faine | 2003 | All-American center at Notre Dame and in the NFL | |
| Mike Fanning | | Defensive tackle at Notre Dame and in the NFL | |
| James Farragher | | Offensive lineman at Notre Dame and Notre Dame coach | |
| Anthony Fasano | 2006 | Tight end at Notre Dame and with the Dallas Cowboys | |
| Vagas Ferguson | 1980 | All-American running back at Notre Dame and in the NFL | |
| Cedric Figaro | 1988 | Linebacker at Notre Dame and in the NFL | |
| Bill Fischer | 1949 | College Football Hall of Fame and Outland Trophy-winning offensive lineman at Notre Dame and with the Chicago Cardinals | |
| Tony Fisher | 2002 | Running back at Notre Dame and in the NFL | |
| Jim Flanigan | 1994 | Defensive tackle at Notre Dame and in the NFL and Walter Payton Man of the Year Award winner | |
| Marcus Freeman | 2006 | Tight end at Notre Dame and in the NFL | |
| Wally Fromhart | 1936 | Quarterback, kicker, and returner at Notre Dame | |
| Mike Gandy | 2001 | Offensive tackle at Notre Dame and in the NFL | |
| Mike Gann | 1985 | Defensive lineman at Notre Dame and in the NFL | |
| Art Garvey | | Offensive lineman at Notre Dame, in the AFL, and in the NFL | |
| George Gipp | | College Football Hall of Fame halfback at Notre Dame | |
| David Givens | 2002 | Wide receiver at Notre Dame and in the NFL | |
| George Goeddeke | 1967 | Offensive lineman at Notre Dame and with the Denver Broncos | |
| Bob Golic | 1979 | Defensive tackle at Notre Dame and in the NFL, actor and radio host | |
| Mike Golic | 1985 | Defensive lineman at Notre Dame and in the NFL and radio/television personality | |
| Joey Goodspeed | | Fullback at Notre Dame and in the NFL | |
| Chet Grant | | Quarterback at Notre Dame, assistant collegiate coach, and sports writer | |
| Ryan Grant | 2005 | Running back at Notre Dame and in the NFL | |
| Paul Grasmanis | 1996 | Defensive lineman at Notre Dame and in the NFL | |
| David Grimes | 2009 | Wide receiver at Notre Dame | |
| Jerry Groom | 1951 | College Football Hall of Fame defensive lineman at Notre Dame and with the Chicago Cardinals | |
| Tim Grunhard | 1990 | Offensive lineman at Notre Dame and with the Kansas City Chiefs | |
| Ralph Guglielmi | 1955 | All-American, Hall of Fame quarterback at Notre Dame and in the NFL | |
| George Haffner | Did not graduate | Quarterback at Notre Dame and later at McNeese State University and in the NFL | |
| Kris Haines | 1979 | Wide receiver at Notre Dame and in the NFL | |
| Don Hamilton | 1913 | Quarterback at Notre Dame and for the Canton Bulldogs and collegiate referee | |
| Terry Hanratty | 1969 | All-American quarterback at Notre Dame and with the Pittsburgh Steelers | |
| Bob Hargrave | 1942 | All-American quarterback at Notre Dame | |
| Deveron Harper | | NFL player | |
| Ryan Harris | 2007 | Offensive lineman at Notre Dame and with the Denver Broncos | |
| Leon Hart | 1950 | Maxwell Award-winning, Heisman Trophy-winning, College Football Hall of Fame end at Notre Dame and with the Detroit Lions | |
| Michael Haywood | 1986 | Wide receiver at Notre Dame and collegiate assistant coach, currently offensive coordinator at Notre Dame | |
| Andy Heck | 1989 | All-American tight end at Notre Dame and in the NFL and football coach | |
| Pat Heenan | 1960 | Cornerback at Notre Dame and with the Washington Redskins | |
| Craig Hentrich | 1994 | Placekicker and punter at Notre Dame and in the NFL | |
| Frank "Nordy" Hoffman | 1932 | All-American, College Football Hall of Fame guard at Notre Dame | |
| Carlyle Holiday | 2004 | Quarterback and wide receiver at Notre Dame and wide receiver in the NFL | |
| Pete Holohan | 1982 | Tight end at Notre Dame and in the NFL | |
| Skip Holtz | 1986 | Wide receiver at Notre Dame and head football coach at East Carolina University | |
| Paul Hornung | 1957 | All-American, Heisman Trophy-winning, College Football Hall of Fame halfback at Notre Dame and Pro Football Hall of Fame member of the Green Bay Packers | |
| John Huarte | 1965 | Heisman Trophy-winning, College Football Hall of Fame quarterback at Notre Dame and in the NFL | |
| Dave Huffman | 1979 | Tackle at Notre Dame and with the Minnesota Vikings | |
| Al Hunter | 1980 | Player at Notre Dame and with the Seattle Seahawks | |
| Art Hunter | 1954 | Tackle at Notre Dame and in the NFL | |
| Tony Hunter | 1983 | Tight end at Notre Dame and in the NFL | |
| Grant Irons | 2002 | Linebacker at Notre Dame and in the NFL | |
| Raghib Ismail | Did not graduate | All-American wide receiver and kick returner at Notre Dame and in the CFL and NFL | |
| George Izo | 1960 | Quarterback at Notre Dame and in the NFL | |
| Jarious Jackson | | Quarterback at Notre Dame, in the NFL, and the CFL | |
| Chuck Jaskwhich | 1933 | Quarterback and basketball player at Notre Dame and later basketball coach at Ole Miss | |
| Anthony Johnson | 1990 | Running back at Notre Dame and in the NFL | |
| Joe Johnson | 1985 | Wide receiver at Notre Dame and in the NFL | |
| Malcolm Johnson | 1999 | NFL and CFL wide receiver | |
| Demetrius Jones | Did not graduate | Quarterback at Notre Dame and later at Cincinnati | |
| Julius Jones | | All-American running back at Notre Dame and with the Dallas Cowboys | |
| Mirko Jurkovic | 1991 | All-American Offensive guard at Notre Dame | |
| Steve Juzwik | 1942 | Running back at Notre Dame and in the NFL | |
| Mike Kadish | 1973 | Defensive lineman at Notre Dame and in the NFL | |
| Joe Kantor | 1966 | Running back at Notre Dame and with the Washington Redskins | |
| Ken Karcher | Did not graduate | Quarterback at Notre Dame and later Tulane, in the NFL, and collegiate football coach | |
| Joe Katchik | | Defensive tackle for the New York Titans | |
| Emmett Keefe | | Guard at Notre Dame and in the NFL | |
| Blair Kiel | 1984 | Quarterback at Notre Dame, in the NFL, CFL, and the Arena Football League | |
| Randy Kinder | | Running back at Notre Dame and in the NFL | |
| Lindsay Knapp | 1992; MBA 1998 | Player at Notre Dame and in the NFL | |
| John Kovatch | 1942 | End at Notre Dame and in the NFL | |
| Scott Kowalkowski | 1991 | Linebacker at Notre Dame and in the NFl | |
| Vic Kulbitski | | Fullback at Notre Dame | |
| Frank Kuchta | 1958 | Offensive lineman at Notre Dame, in the NFL, and the CFL | |
| Bob Kuechenberg | 1969 | Guard at Notre Dame and in the NFL | |
| Joe Kuharich | 1938 | Guard at Notre Dame and with the Chicago Cardinals and collegiate and professional coach most notably at Notre Dame and with the Philadelphia Eagles | |
| George Kunz | 1969 | All-American tackle at Notre Dame and in the NFL | |
| Earl "Curly" Lambeau | 1919 | Halfback at Notre Dame and with the Green Bay Packers, founder of the Packers and first coach, and member of the Pro Football Hall of Fame | |
| Daryle Lamonica | 1963 | Quarterback at Notre Dame, in the AFL, and the NFL | |
| Derek Landri | 2006 | Defensive tackle at Notre Dame and with the Jacksonville Jaguars | |
| Chuck Lanza | 1987 | Center for the Pittsburgh Steelers | |
| Johnny Lattner | 1954 | All-American, Maxwell Award-winning, Heisman Trophy-winning, College Football Hall of Fame halfback at Notre Dame and with the Pittsburgh Steelers | |
| Don Lawrence | 1959 | Tackle at Notre Dame and with the Washington Redskins and collegiate and professional football coach | |
| Elmer Layden | 1925 | All-American, College Football Hall of Fame fullback at Notre Dame as a member of the famed "Four Horsemen", player in the AFL, coach at Notre Dame, and commissioner of the NFL | |
| Bernie Leahy | | Chicago Bears player, 1932 | |
| Frank Leahy | 1931 | Tackle at Notre Dame and College Football Hall of Fame coach at Boston College and Notre Dame | |
| Lance Legree | 2001 | Defensive tackle at Notre Dame and in the NFL | |
| Ray Lemek | 1956 | Guard at Notre Dame and in the NFL | |
| Jim Leonard | 1934 | Running back at Notre Dame and with the Philadelphia Eagles and Pittsburgh Steelers head coach | |
| William J. Leonard | | End at Notre Dame, with the Baltimore Colts, and in the CFL | |
| Bobby Leopold | 1980 | Linebacker at Notre Dame, in the NFl, and the USFL | |
| Mark LeVoir | 2005 | Offensive tackle at Notre Dame and in the NFl | |
| Tom Lieb | 1924 | All-American lineman and assistant coach under Knute Rockne; coached the 1929 national champion team while Rockne was in the hospital; coached the Notre Dame hockey team; subsequently served as the head coach of the Loyola Los Angeles football and hockey teams and the University of Florida football team | |
| Rusty Lisch | 1980 | Quarterback at Notre Dame and in the NFL | |
| Bob Livingstone | 1948 | Halfback at Notre Dame and the AAFC and NFL | |
| Matt LoVecchio | Did not graduate | Quarterback at Notre Dame, later at Indiana, and in the NFL | |
| Johnny Lujack | 1948 | All-American, Heisman Trophy-winning, College Football Hall of Fame quarterback at Notre Dame and for the Chicago Bears | |
| Todd Lyght | 1991 | Cornerback at Notre Dame and in the NFL | |
| Dick Lynch | 1958 | Defensive back at Notre Dame and in the NFL | |
| Jim Lynch | 1967 | All-American, Maxwell Award-winning, College Football Hall of Fame linebacker at Notre Dame and with the Kansas City Chiefs | |
| Ken MacAfee | 1978 | Walter Camp Award-winning, College Football Hall of Fame tight end at Notre Dame and with the San Francisco 49ers | |
| Sean Mahan | 2003 | Center at Notre Dame and in the NFL | |
| Jim Martin | 1950 | All-American, College Football Hall of Fame player at Notre Dame and in the NFL | |
| Greg Marx | 1973 | All-American | |
| Derrick Mayes | 1996 | Wide receiver at Notre Dame and in the NFL | |
| Corey Mays | 2005 | Linebacker at Notre Dame and in the NFL | |
| John Mazur | 1952 | Quarterback at Notre Dame and in the CFL and collegiate and professional football coach | |
| Mike McCoy | 1970 | All-American defensive tackle at Notre Dame and in the NFL | |
| Angus Daniel McDonald | | Quarterback and first baseman on the baseball team at Notre Dame and president of Southern Pacific Company | |
| Kevin McDougal | 1994 | Quarterback at Notre Dame, in the NFL, CFL, Arena Football League, and the XFL | |
| Gene McGuire | | Center at Notre Dame and in the NFL | |
| Rhema McKnight | 2005 | Wide receiver at Notre Dame | |
| Harry Mehre | 1922 | Football and basketball player at Notre Dame and in the NFL and collegiate football coach | |
| Art Mergenthal | | Guard and Notre Dame and in the NFL | |
| Bert Metzger | 1931 | All-American, College Football Hall of Fame guard at Notre Dame | |
| Creighton Miller | 1944 | College Football Hall of Fame halfback at Notre Dame | |
| Don Miller | 1925 | All-American, College Football Hall of Fame halfback at Notre Dame, member of the "Four Horsemen", and collegiate coach | |
| Edgar Miller | 1925 | College Football Hall of Fame tackle at Notre Dame | |
| Fred Miller | 1929 | College Football Hall of Fame tackle at Notre Dame and president of Miller Brewing Company | |
| Wayne Millner | 1936 | All-American, College Football Hall of Fame end at Notre Dame and Pro Football Hall of Fame member of the Washington Redskins | |
| Rick Mirer | 1993 | Quarterback at Notre Dame and in the NFL | |
| John Mohardt | 1922 | Football and baseball player at Notre Dame and professionally | |
| Bill Mohn | | Quarterback at Notre Dame | |
| Jim Molinaro | | Offensive lineman at Notre Dame and in the NFL | |
| Joe Montana | 1979 | Quarterback at Notre Dame and Pro Football Hall of Fame member most notably for his time with the San Francisco 49ers | |
| Larry Moriarty | 1983 | Running back at Notre Dame and in the NFL | |
| Angelo Mosca | | Defensive tackle at Notre Dame and member of the Canadian Football Hall of Fame for years in the CFL | |
| Fred Mundee | | Center at Notre Dame and in the NFL | |
| Jim Mutscheller | 1952 | Tight end at Notre Dame and with the Baltimore Colts | |
| Bronko Nagurski Jr. | 1959 | Offensive lineman at Notre Dame and in the CFL | |
| Chinedum Ndukwe | 2007 | Safety at Notre Dame and with the Cincinnati Bengals | |
| Steve Nemeth | | Played in NFL, AAFC and CFL | |
| Steve Niehaus | | Defensive tackle at Notre Dame and in the NFL | |
| Harry O'Boyle | | Blocking back at Notre Dame and in the NFL | |
| Dan O'Leary | 2000 | Tight end at Notre Dame and in the NFL | |
| Bob Olson | 1970 | Linebacker at Notre Dame | |
| Chet Ostrowski | | End at Notre Dame and with the Washington Redskins | |
| John Owens | 2002 | Tight end at Notre Dame and in the NFL | |
| Alan Page | 1967 | All-American, College Football Hall of Fame defensive tackle at Notre Dame, Pro Football Hall of Fame member in the NFl, and justice in the Minnesota Supreme Court | |
| Walt Patulski | 1972 | All-American, Lombardi Award-winning defensive end at Notre Dame and in the NFL | |
| John Pergine | 1969 | All-American linebacker at Notre Dame and in the NFL | |
| John Petitbon | 1952 | Safety and All-American halfback at Notre Dame and defensive back in the NFL | |
| Luke Petitgout | 1999 | Tackle at Notre Dame and in the NFL | |
| James Phelan | 1918 | Quarterback at Notre Dame and in the NFL and College Football Hall of Fame coach | |
| Nick Pietrosante | 1959 | Fullback at Notre Dame and in the NFL | |
| Andy Pilney | | Quarterback and baseball player at Notre Dame, college football coach, and professional baseball player | |
| Allen Pinkett | 1986 | All-American running back at Notre Dame and most notably in the NFL for the Houston Oilers | |
| Bull Polisky | | Guard at Notre Dame and in the NFL | |
| Myron Pottios | | Linebacker at Notre Dame and in the NFL | |
| Ron Powlus | 1997 | Quarterback at Notre Dame and in the NFL, and Notre Dame quarterback coach | |
| Phil Pozderac | 1982 | Offensive lineman at Notre Dame and with the Dallas Cowboys | |
| Geoff Price | 2007 | Punter at Notre Dame | |
| Joe Prokop | | Halfback in the AAFC | |
| Andy Puplis | 1940 | All-American quarterback and baseball player at Notre Dame | |
| Brady Quinn | 2007 | All-American, Sammy Baugh Trophy-winning, Johnny Unitas Golden Arm Award-winning, Maxwell Award-winning quarterback at Notre Dame and with the Cleveland Browns | |
| George Ratterman | 1947 | Four sport athlete at Notre Dame and quarterback in the NFL | |
| John Ray | Did not graduate | Player at Notre Dame and later Olivet College and head coach at Kentucky | |
| Tom Rehder | | NFL offensive lineman | |
| Tony Rice | 1990 | All-American, Johnny Unitas Golden Arm Award-winning quarterback at Notre Dame and in the CFL | |
| Mike I. Richardson | 2006 | Defensive back at Notre Dame and with the New England Patriots | |
| Chuck Riley | | Quarterback and punt returner at Notre Dame and New Mexico coach | |
| Knute Rockne | | Player and College Football Hall of Fame head coach at Notre Dame and inspiration for the film, Knute Rockne, All American | |
| Mike Rosenthal | 1999 | Offensive tackle at Notre Dame and in the NFL | |
| Allen Rossum | 1998 | Cornerback and All-American track athlete at Notre Dame and cornerback in the NFL | |
| Tim Ruddy | 1994 | Center at Notre Dame and with the Miami Dolphins | |
| Daniel "Rudy" Ruettiger | 1976 | Defensive player at Notre Dame, motivational speaker, and inspiration for the film Rudy | |
| Ed Rutkowski | 1963 | Wide receiver at Notre Dame and in the AFL | |
| Jules Rykovich | | Running back at Notre Dame and in the NFL | |
| Lou Rymkus | 1943 | All-American tackle at Notre Dame and in the NFL and coach in the AFL and NFL | |
| Louis J. Salmon | 1904 | All-American, College Football Hall of Fame fullback at Notre Dame who also served as coach | |
| Chris Salvi | | Football player | |
| Dan Santucci | 2006 | Offensive tackle at Notre Dame and with the Cincinnati Bengals | |
| Gerome Sapp | 2003 | Safety at Notre Dame and in the NFL | |
| Joe Savoldi | Did not graduate | Fullback and track athlete at Notre Dame, fullback with the Chicago Bears, professional wrestler, and spy in World War II | |
| Bob Scarpitto | 1961 | Player at Notre Dame and in the AFL | |
| Tom Schoen | 1968 | Consensus All-American | |
| Jim Schrader | 1954 | Center at Notre Dame and in the NFL | |
| Marchmont Schwartz | 1932 | All-American, College Football Hall of Fame halfback at Notre Dame and coach at Stanford | |
| Joe Scibelli | 1961 | Offensive lineman at Notre Dame and with the Los Angeles Rams | |
| Vince Scott | | Lineman at Notre Dame and in the CFL | |
| John Scully | 1981 | Guard at Notre Dame and with the Atlanta Falcons | |
| Jim Seymour | 1969 | Wide receiver at Notre Dame and with the Chicago Bears | |
| William Shakespeare | 1936 | All-American, College Football Hall of Fame halfback at Notre Dame | |
| Frank Shaughnessy | 1905 | Football, baseball, and track athlete at Notre Dame, Major League Baseball player, and collegiate football coach | |
| Buck Shaw | 1922 | Tackle at Notre Dame and College Football Hall of Fame coach | |
| Emil Sitko | 1950 | All-American, College Football Hall of Fame running back at Notre Dame and in the NFL | |
| Bob Skoglund | 1947 | End at Notre Dame and with the Green Bay Packers | |
| Rick Slager | | Quarterback at Notre Dame | |
| Brian Smith | | Linebacker at Notre Dame and for the Cleveland Browns | |
| Gene Smith | 1977 | Defensive end at Notre Dame and athletic director at Ohio State | |
| Hunter Smith | 1999 | Punter at Notre Dame and with the Indianapolis Colts | |
| Irv Smith | 1993 | Tight end at Notre Dame and in the NFL | |
| John "Clipper" Smith | 1928 | All-American, College Football Hall of Fame guard at Notre Dame and collegiate football coach | |
| Rod Smith | 1992 | Defensive back at Notre Dame and in the NFL | |
| Jack Snow | 1965 | Wide receiver at Notre Dame and with the St. Louis Rams | |
| Jim Snowden | 1965 | Offensive tackle at Notre Dame and with the Washington Redskins | |
| Frank Spaniel | | Halfback at Notre Dame and in the NFL | |
| Frank Stams | 1989 | All-American defensive end at Notre Dame and linebacker in the NFL | |
| Pat Steenberge | 1973 | Quarterback at Notre Dame | |
| Bill Steinkemper | | Tackle at Notre Dame and in the NFL | |
| Dan Stevenson | 2006 | Guard at Notre Dame and in the NFL | |
| Monty Stickles | 1960 | All-American tight end at Notre Dame and in the NFL and radio broadcaster | |
| Mike Stonebreaker | 1991 | All-American linebacker at Notre Dame and in the NFL | |
| Maurice Stovall | 2006 | Wide receiver at Notre Dame and with the Tampa Bay Buccaneers | |
| George Strohmeyer | | Center at Notre Dame and the AAFC | |
| Harry Stuhldreher | 1925 | College Football Hall of Fame quarterback at Notre Dame, collegiate coach, and author | |
| Steve Sylvester | 1975 | Offensive lineman at Notre Dame and with the Oakland Raiders | |
| Dick Szymanski | | Offensive lineman at Notre Dame and with the Baltimore Colts | |
| Kinnon Tatum | 1997 | NFL player | |
| Aaron Taylor | 1994 | All-American, Lombardi Award-winning guard at Notre Dame and in the NFL and former college football analyst | |
| Bobby Taylor | 1995 | All-American cornerback at Notre Dame and in the NFL | |
| George Terlep | Did not graduate | Player at Notre Dame, quarterback in the AAFC, and coach in the CFL | |
| Pat Terrell | 1990 | Safety at Notre Dame and in the NFL | |
| Tom Thayer | 1983 | Guard at Notre Dame and in the NFL and radio commentator | |
| Joe Theismann | 1971 | All-American, College Football Hall of Fame quarterback at Notre Dame, in the CFL, and with the Washington Redskins, businessman, and television commentator | |
| Frank Thomas | 1923 | Quarterback at Notre Dame and College Football Hall of Fame football coach | |
| Robert R. Thomas | 1974 | Placekicker at Notre Dame and in the NFL and chief justice of the Supreme Court of Illinois | |
| Travis Thomas | 2007 | Halfback and linebacker at Notre Dame | |
| George Tobin | | Guard at Notre Dame and in the NFL | |
| Bob Toneff | 1952 | Defensive tackle at Notre Dame and in the NFL | |
| Stacey Toran | 1984 | Defensive back at Notre Dame and with the Los Angeles Raiders | |
| Mike Townsend | 1974 | All-American | |
| George Trafton | 1920 | Center at Notre Dame and in the NFL, member of the Pro Football Hall of Fame, and CFL coach | |
| Frank Tripucka | 1949 | All-American quarterback at Notre Dame, in the NFL, the CFL, and the AFL | |
| Justin Tuck | 2005 | Defensive end at Notre Dame and with the New York Giants | |
| Frank Varrichione | 1955 | Tackle at Notre Dame and in the NFL | |
| Mike Wadsworth | 1966 | Defensive lineman at Notre Dame and the CFL and Notre Dame athletic director | |
| Darius Walker | 2009 | Running back at Notre Dame and in the NFL | |
| Fred Wallner | 1951 | Guard at Notre Dame and in the NFL and AFL | |
| Adam Walsh | 1925 | College Football Hall of Fame center at Notre Dame and coach in the NFL | |
| Bill Walsh | 1949 | Center at Notre Dame and in the NFL | |
| Courtney Watson | 2003 | Linebacker at Notre Dame and in the NFL | |
| Ricky Watters | 1991 | Running back and wide receiver at Notre Dame and running back in the NFL | |
| Dave Waymer | 1980 | Defensive back at Notre Dame and in the NFL | |
| Anthony Weaver | 2002 | Defensive end at Notre Dame and in the NFL | |
| Bob Wetoska | 1959 | Offensive lineman at Notre Dame and with the Chicago Bears | |
| Jim White | | NFL player | |
| Bill Wightkin | 1949 | Tackle at Notre Dame and with the Chicago Bears | |
| Bob Williams | | All-American, College Football Hall of Fame quarterback at Notre Dame and with the Chicago Bears | |
| Larry Williams | | Offensive lineman at Notre Dame and the NFL | |
| Robert Williams | 1959 | Quarterback at Notre Dame | |
| Jerry Wisne | 1998 | Offensive guard at Notre Dame and 4 years in the NFL | |
| Shawn Wooden | 1995 | Safety at Notre Dame and in the NFL | |
| Harry Wunsch | | Guard at Notre Dame and in the NFL | |
| Renaldo Wynn | 1996 | Defensive end at Notre Dame and in the NFL | |
| Chet A. Wynne | | Fullback at Notre Dame and for the Rochester Jeffersons and collegiate football coach | |
| Tommy Yarr | 1932 | All-American, Hall of Fame center at Notre Dame | |
| John Yonakor | 1945 | Defensive end at Notre Dame and in the NFL | |
| Justin Yoon | 2015 | Kicker at Notre Dame | |
| Bryant Young | 1994 | All-American defensive end at Notre Dame and with the San Francisco 49ers | |
| Sam Young | 2010 | Left tackle at Notre Dame | |
| Ernie Zalejski | | Halfback at Notre Dame and in the NFL | |
| Tom Zbikowski | 2007 | All-American safety at Notre Dame and professional boxer | |
| Dusty Zeigler | 1996 | Center at Notre Dame and in the NFL | |
| Ray Zellars | 1995 | Running back at Notre Dame and with the New Orleans Saints | |
| William J. Zloch | 1966; JD 1974 | Quarterback at Notre Dame and chief justice of the United States District Court for the Southern District of Florida | |
| Clyde Zoia | | Guard at Notre Dame and for the Chicago Cardinals | |
| Chris Zorich | 1991; JD 2002 | All-American, College Football Hall of Fame defensive tackle at Notre Dame and in the NFL | |

- Nate Silver, football quarterback

== Baseball ==
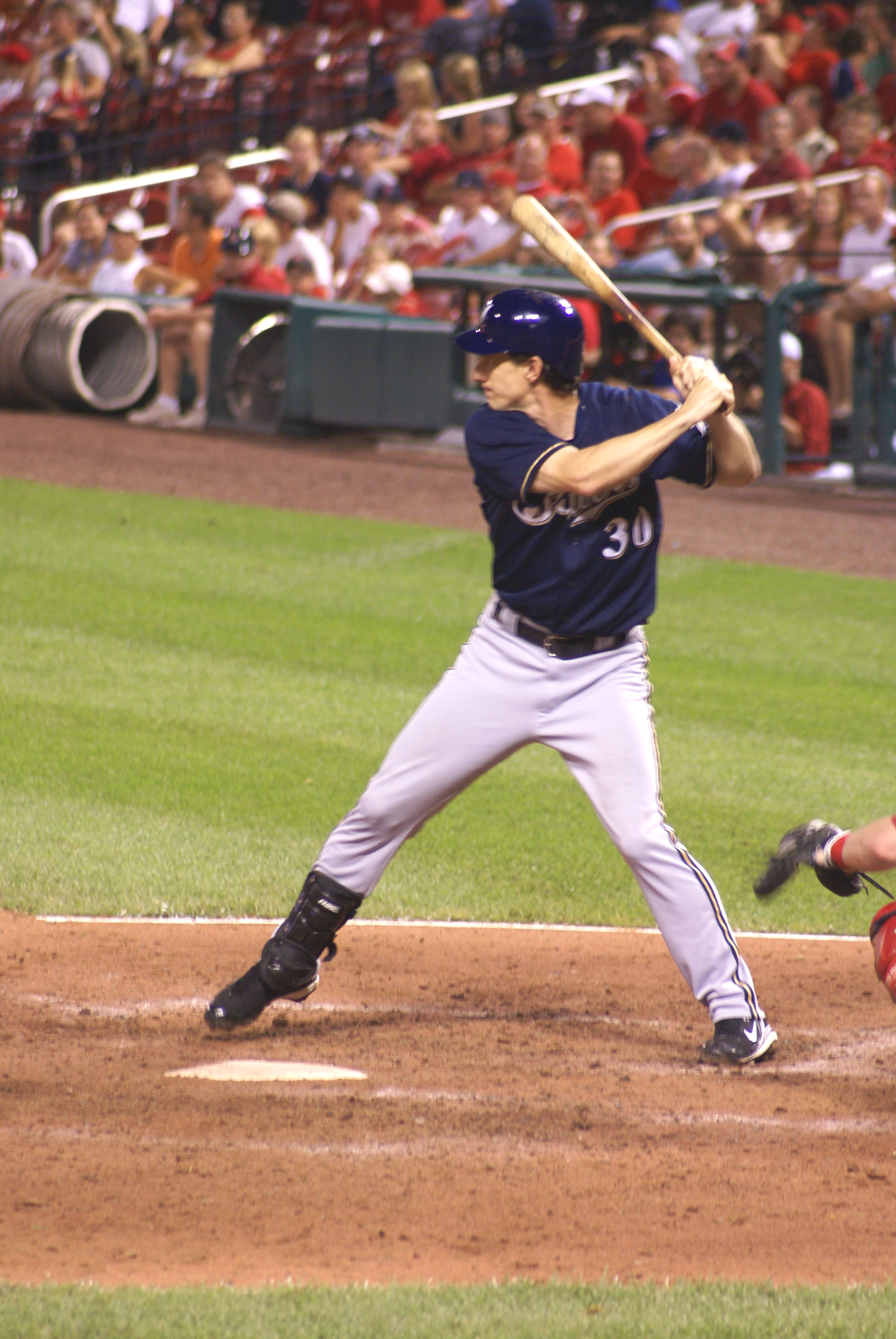
Craig Counsell

| Name | Class year | Notability | Reference(s) |
|---|---|---|---|
| Cap Anson | Did not graduate | First baseman at Notre Dame, professional baseball player for multiple Major League Baseball (MLB) teams and member of the National Baseball Hall of Fame | |
| John Axford | 2005 | Pitcher at Notre Dame; lost his athletic scholarships after undergoing Tommy John surgery, but still graduated with a degree in film; now a Major League Baseball closer for the Milwaukee Brewers; holds the Brewers franchise record for most saves in a single season | |
| Alfred Bergman | 1914 | Four sport athlete at Notre Dame who earned 13 varsity letters and played professionally for the Cleveland Indians | |
| Bob Bescher | | Outfielder at Notre Dame and professionally for multiple Major League Baseball (MLB) teams | |
| Cavan Biggio | 2016 | Second baseman at Notre Dame, utility player for the Toronto Blue Jays and Los Angeles Dodgers; son of Hall of Famer Craig Biggio | |
| Craig Counsell | 1992 | Infielder at Notre Dame and professionally for the Milwaukee Brewers | |
| Norwood Gibson | 1901 | Starting pitcher at Notre Dame and professionally for the Boston Americans | |
| Aaron Heilman | 2001 | Pitcher at Notre Dame; currently a professional relief pitcher for the Seattle Mariners | |
| Brad Lidge | Did not graduate | Relief pitcher at Notre Dame and professionally for the Philadelphia Phillies | |
| Matt Macri | Did not graduate | Third baseman at Notre Dame and professionally for the Minnesota Twins | |
| Trey Mancini | | outfielder for the Baltimore Orioles | |
| Jeff Manship | | right-handed pitcher for the Minnesota Twins | |
| Jackie Mayo | 1947 | professional baseball player who appeared in 139 Major League games for the Philadelphia Phillies | |
| Willie McGill | Did not graduate | Professional baseball player who played for the St. Louis Browns | |
| Chris Michalak | 1993 | Pitcher at Notre Dame and professionally for multiple MLB teams | |
| Red Murray | 1906 | Outfielder at Notre Dame and professionally for the New York Giants | |
| Christian Parker | Did not graduate | Pitcher at Notre Dame and professionally | |
| Doc Powers | 1902 | Catcher at Notre Dame and professionally | |
| Ron Reed | 1965 | Pitcher and basketball player at Notre Dame and professionally for the Detroit Pistons and the Atlanta Braves | |
| Jeff Samardzija | Did not graduate | Pitcher and All American wide receiver at Notre Dame and professional starting pitcher for the San Francisco Giants; also pitched for the Chicago Cubs, Oakland Athletics, and Chicago White Sox | |
| Louis Sockalexis | Did not graduate | Outfielder at Notre Dame and professionally for the Cleveland Spiders and namesake of the Cleveland Indians | |
| Cy Williams | 1912 | Multi-sport athlete at Notre Dame, outfielder for two MLB teams, and architect | |
| Carl Yastrzemski | Did not graduate | Outfielder at Notre Dame and professionally for the Boston Red Sox and member of the National Baseball Hall of Fame | |

== Basketball ==
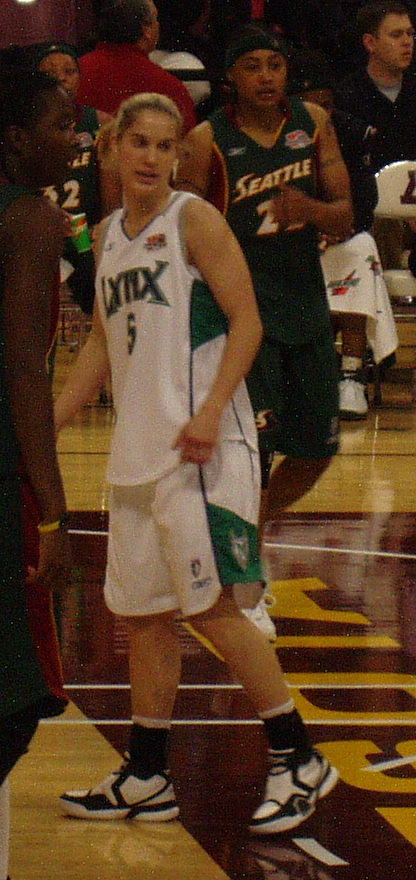
Megan Duffy

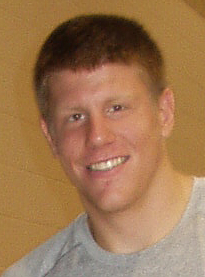
Luke Harangody

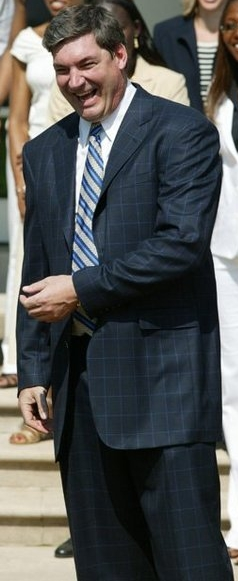
Bill Laimbeer

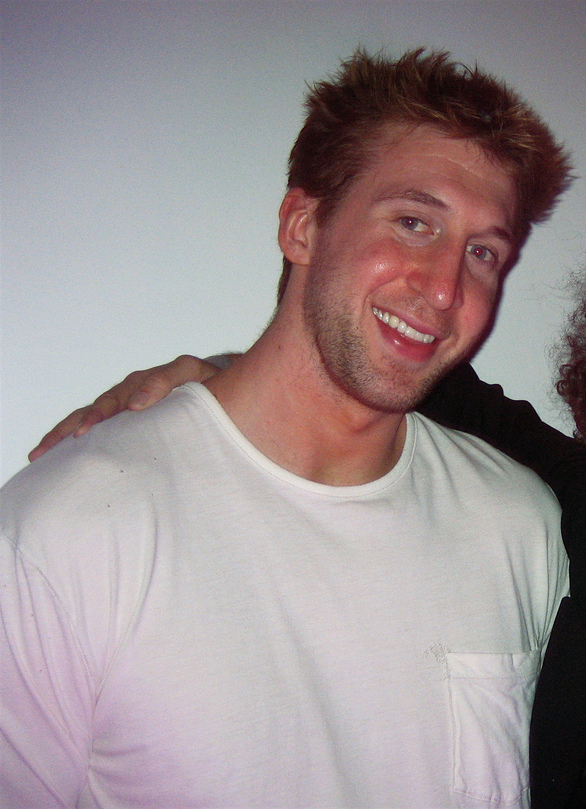
Troy Murphy

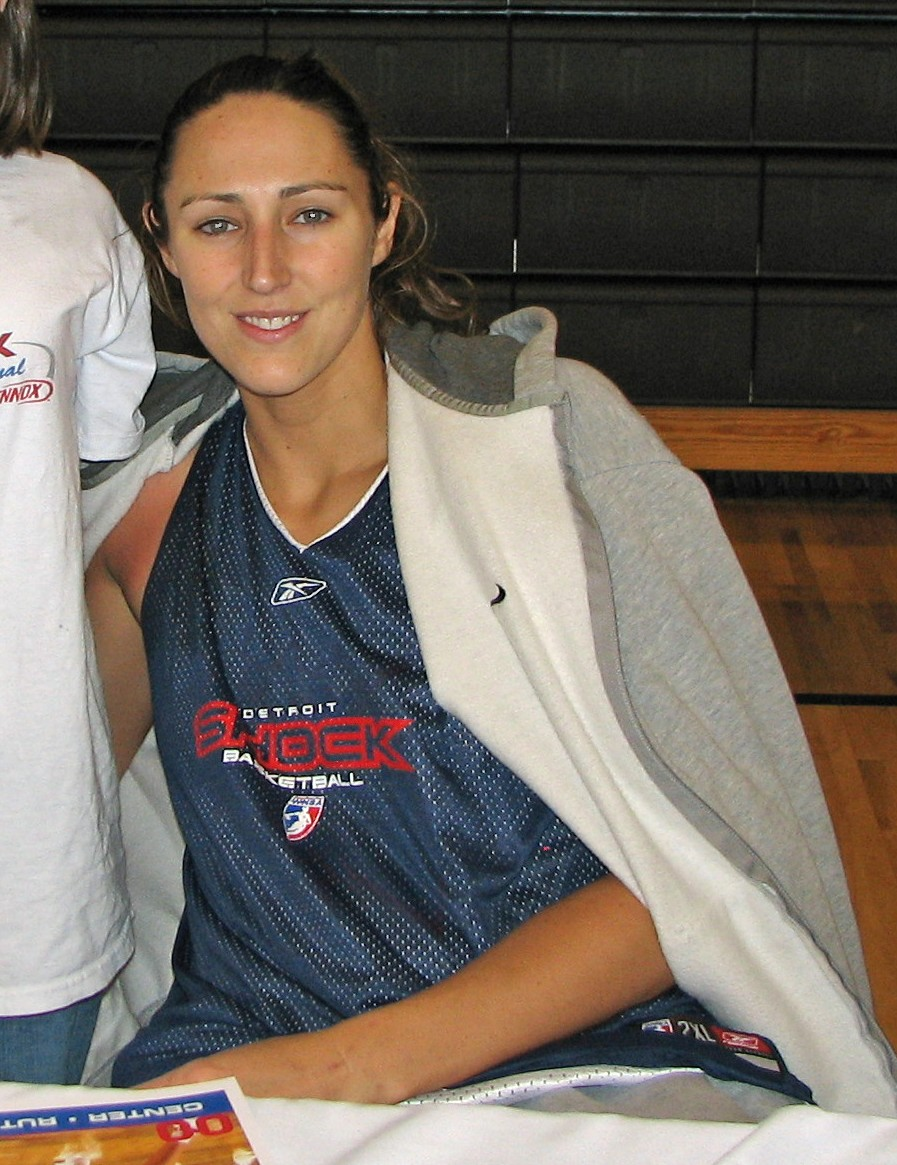
Ruth Riley

| Name | Class year | Notability | Reference(s) |
|---|---|---|---|
| Natalie Achonwa | 2014 | Former WNBA player with the Indiana Fever | |
| Bob Arnzen | 1969 | Basketball player at Notre Dame and professionally in the American Basketball Association (ABA) and the National Basketball Association (NBA) | |
| Leo Barnhorst | 1949 | Basketball player at Notre Dame and professionally in the NBA and member of the Indiana Basketball Hall of Fame | |
| Jacqueline Batteast | 2005 | Basketball at Notre Dame and professionally in the Women's National Basketball Association (WNBA) | |
| Dave Batton | 1978 | Basketball player at Notre Dame and for multiple teams in the NBA | |
| Elmer Bennett | 1992 | Guard at Notre Dame, in the NBA, and the Spanish Liga ACB | |
| Sandy Botham | 1988; MA 1990 | All-American at Notre Dame and current head coach of the University of Wisconsin–Milwaukee women's basketball team | |
| Gary Brokaw | 1974 | Player and assistant coach at Notre Dame and NBA player, assistant coach, and director of basketball operations | |
| Austin Carr | Did not graduate | Naismith College Player of the Year at Notre Dame and player in the NBA | |
| Matt Carroll | 2003 | Shooting guard at Notre Dame and professionally in the NBA | |
| Russell Carter | 2007 | Shooting guard at Notre Dame and professionally for the NBADL's Tulsa 66ers | |
| Sid Catlett | 1971 | Player at Notre Dame and professionally for the Cincinnati Royals | |
| Sonia Citron | 2025 | Current point guard for the Washington Mystics of the WNBA | |
| Pat Connaughton | 2015 | Swingman at Notre Dame and current NBA player with the Milwaukee Bucks; also played baseball for Notre Dame as a starting pitcher, and played in the Baltimore Orioles' minor-league organization while at Notre Dame | |
| Adrian Dantley | 1976 | Oscar Robertson Trophy-winning forward at Notre Dame, in the NBA, and for the United States men's national basketball team that won the gold medal in the 1976 Summer Olympics; enshrined in the Naismith Memorial Basketball Hall of Fame in 2008 | |
| Skylar Diggins | 2013 | Current point guard for the Chicago Sky of the WNBA; consensus first-team All-American and winner of the Nancy Lieberman Award as the nation's top women's point guard in both 2012 and 2013 | |
| Megan Duffy | 2006 | Former point guard at Notre Dame and in the WNBA; now women's basketball head coach at Miami University | |
| LaPhonso Ellis | 1992 | Forward at Notre Dame and in the NBA | |
| Colin Falls | 2006 | Shooting guard at Notre Dame and in Italy in Serie A | |
| Katryna Gaither | 1997 | Basketball player at Notre Dame, professionally in the American Basketball League (ABL), the WNBA, multiple European leagues, and member of the United States women's national basketball team in the 1999 Pan American Games | |
| Pat Garrity | 1998 | Power forward at Notre Dame who won the Big East Men's Basketball Player of the Year in 1997 and professional player in the NBA | |
| Jerian Grant | Did not graduate | Combo guard at Notre Dame and current NBA player with the New York Knicks | |
| Ben Hansbrough | 2011 | Guard at Notre Dame who won the Big East Men's Basketball Player of the Year in 2011 | |
| Bill Hanzlik | 1980 | Player at Notre Dame and player and coach in the NBA | |
| Luke Harangody | 2010 | Power forward for Notre Dame from 2006–10. Big East Player of the Year in 2008; three-time second-team All-American; only men's player in Big East history to average 20 points and 10 rebounds per game in conference play for his career; currently in the D-League with the Canton Charge; has played in the NBA with the Boston Celtics and Cleveland Cavaliers | |
| Billy Hassett | | Guard at Notre Dame and in the NBA | |
| Tom Hawkins | 1959 | Forward at Notre Dame and in the NBA | |
| Ryan Humphrey | 2002 | Forward at Notre Dame, in the NBA, and in Greece | |
| George Ireland | 1936 | All-American at Notre Dame and college basketball coach at Loyola University Chicago | |
| Niele Ivey | 2000 | Point guard at Notre Dame, in the WNBA, and assistant coach at Notre Dame | |
| Tracy Jackson | 1981 | Player at Notre Dame and in the NBA | |
| Collis Jones | | Basketball player at Notre Dame and in the NBA | |
| Tim Kempton | 1986 | Center at Notre Dame and in multiple teams in the NBA | |
| Joe Kleine | Did not graduate (transferred to Arkansas) | Center at Notre Dame for a year and professionally in the NBA | |
| Moose Krause | | All-American in football and basketball at Notre Dame and coach for Notre Dame's men's basketball team | |
| Rob Kurz | 2008 | NBA player | |
| Bill Laimbeer | 1979 | Center at Notre Dame, professionally in Italy, and professionally in the NBA and coach in the WNBA | |
| Jewell Loyd | Did not graduate | Current WNBA player with the Seattle Storm; #1 draft pick and WNBA Rookie of the Year in 2015 | |
| Michelle M. Marciniak | Did not graduate (transferred to the University of Tennessee) | Player for a year at Notre Dame, professionally in the WNBA, on the United States women's national basketball team in the 1999 Pan American Games | |
| Ray Meyer | 1938 | Player at Notre Dame and longtime coach for the DePaul Blue Demons men's basketball team; member of both the Naismith Memorial and College Basketball Halls of Fame | |
| Jay Miller | | Player at Notre Dame and in the NBA and ABA | |
| Beth Morgan | 1997 | Player at Notre Dame, in the ABL, and for the United States women's national basketball team in the 1999 Pan American Games | |
| Troy Murphy | Did not graduate | All-American center at Notre Dame and in the NBA | |
| Natalie Novosel | 2012 | Guard at Notre Dame and first-round pick of the Washington Mystics in the 2012 WNBA draft | |
| Arike Ogunbowale | 2019 | Current guard for the Dallas Wings; Most Outstanding Player of the 2018 NCAA women's tournament. Also participated in season 26 of the U.S. version of Dancing with the Stars. | |
| Kevin O'Shea | 1950 | Four-time All-American guard at Notre Dame and in the NBA | |
| John Paxson | 1983 | Guard at Notre Dame and in the NBA and former assistant coach and general manager of the Chicago Bulls | |
| Devereaux Peters | 2012 | Forward at Notre Dame and first-round pick of the Minnesota Lynx in the 2012 WNBA draft | |
| Chris Quinn | 2006 | Guard at Notre Dame and for the Miami Heat | |
| Ruth Riley | 2001 | Center at Notre Dame, in the WNBA, multiple European basketball leagues, and for the United States women's national basketball team for the 2004 Summer Olympics | |
| David Rivers | 1988 | Point guard at Notre Dame and in the NBA | |
| Ron Rowan | Did not graduate | Forward at Notre Dame for two years and in the NBA | |
| Donald Royal | 1987 | Forward at Notre Dame and in the NBA | |
| John Shumate | 1975 | Center at Notre Dame and in the NBA and coach at Southern Methodist University and in the WNBA | |
| Carol Shields | 1979 | Player on Notre Dame's first women's varsity basketball team and ophthalmologist | |
| Steve Sitko | 1940 | Basketball player and football quarterback at Notre Dame and professional basketball player | |
| Tom Sluby | 1984 | Shooting guard at Notre Dame and for the Dallas Mavericks | |
| Billy Taylor | 1995 | Player and assistant coach at Notre Dame and head coach at Lehigh and Ball State | |
| Chris Thomas | 2005 | Guard at Notre Dame and professionally in Spain and first player in Notre Dame's history to record at triple-double | |
| Keith Tower | 1993 | Center at Notre Dame and in the NBA | |
| Kelly Tripucka | 1981 | Forward at Notre Dame and in the NBA | |
| Gary Voce | | Forward at Notre Dame and for one season with the Cleveland Cavaliers | |
| Coquese Washington | 1992; JD 1997 | Point guard at Notre Dame and in the ABL, former assistant coach at Notre Dame, and head coach for Penn State Nittany Lions women's basketball team | |
| Monty Williams | 1994 | Forward at Notre Dame and in the NBA and assistant coach for the Portland Trail Blazers | |
| Orlando Woolridge | 1981 | Player at Notre Dame, in the NBA, and in Italy and coach in the WNBA and ABA | |
| Jackie Young | 2019 | Top overall pick in the 2019 WNBA draft by the Las Vegas Aces; started alongside Ogunbowale at guard for the 2018 national championship team | |
| Luke Zeller | 2009 | Forward-center at Notre Dame | |
| Babe Ziegenhorn | | Forward for a year at Notre Dame | |

- Bonzie Colson (born 1996), player for Maccabi Tel Aviv of the Israeli Basketball Premier League

== Ice hockey ==
| Name | Class year | Notability | Reference(s) |
|---|---|---|---|
| David Brown | 2007 | Hockey goaltender for Notre Dame and professionally | |
| Erik Condra | 2009 | Right wing for Notre Dame and professionally for the Tampa Bay Lightning | |
| Mark Eaton | Did not graduate | Defenseman for Notre Dame and professionally for the Pittsburgh Penguins | |
| Rob Globke | 2004 | Right wing for Notre Dame and professionally for the Florida Panthers | |
| Christian Hanson | 2009 | Center for Notre Dame and professionally for the Toronto Maple Leafs | |
| Neil Grant Komadoski | 2004 | Defenseman for Notre Dame and professionally in the American Hockey League (AHL) | |
| Brett Lebda | 2004 | Defenseman for Notre Dame and professionally for the Toronto Maple Leafs | |
| Don Lucia | 1981 | Defenseman for Notre Dame and current head coach of the Minnesota Golden Gophers men's ice hockey team | |
| Bob McNamara | 1983 | Goaltender for Notre Dame and professionally in the AHL and the International Hockey League (IHL) and current general manager of the AHL Grand Rapids Griffins | |
| Greg Meredith | 1980 | Player at Notre Dame who set the record for most goals scored and former professional hockey player | |
| Bill Nyrop | 1974 | Defenseman at Notre Dame and former professional hockey player | |
| Dave Poulin | 1982 | Center at Notre Dame, professional hockey player, and former ice hockey coach at Notre Dame | |
| Ben Simon | 2000 | Center at Notre Dame and professional hockey player in the AHL | |
| Yan Šťastný | Did not graduate | Center and left wing at Notre Dame and professional hockey player in the AHL | |

== Olympians ==
| Name | Class year | Notability | Reference(s) |
|---|---|---|---|
| Vince Boryla | Did not graduate | Basketball player at Notre Dame, professional basketball player, coach, and member of the United States men's national basketball team that won the gold medal in the 1948 Summer Olympics | |
| Shannon Boxx | 1999 | Midfielder on the Notre Dame women's soccer team, professional soccer player, and member of the United States women's national soccer team who won the bronze medal in the 2003 FIFA Women's World Cup and gold medal in the 2004 Summer Olympics | |
| August Desch | 1923 | Track and field runner at Notre Dame and first Notre Dame Olympic medal-winner with a bronze medal in the 1920 Summer Olympics | |
| Marton Gyulai | 2001 | Sprinter at Notre Dame and bobsledder representing Hungary in the 2002 Winter Olympics and 2006 Winter Olympics | |
| Robert Halperin | | Football player at Notre Dame and Wisconsin, and in the NFL, Olympic medal-winner with a bronze medal in yachting in the 1960 Summer Olympics and gold medal winner at the 1963 Pan American Games, one of Chicago's most-decorated World War II heroes, and chairman of Commercial Light Co. | |
| Tom Lieb | 1924 | Track and field discus thrower at Notre Dame and bronze medal-winner in the 1924 Summer Olympics | |
| Kate Markgraf (née Sobrero) | 1998 | Defender on the Notre Dame women's soccer team, professional soccer player, and member of the United States women's national soccer team who won the gold medal in the 1999 FIFA Women's World Cup, the silver medal in the 2000 Summer Olympics, the bronze medal in the 2003 FIFA Women's World Cup, and the gold medal in the 2004 Summer Olympics | |
| Nick Radkewich | 1993 | Cross country and track and field runner at Notre Dame and member of the United States men's national triathlon team who competed in the 2000 Summer Olympics | |
| Alex Wilson | | Track and field athlete and coach at Notre Dame and Canadian Olympian who won a bronze medal in the 1928 Summer Olympics and a silver and two bronze medals in the 1932 Summer Olympics | |
| Rick Wohlhuter | 1971 | Track and field runner at Notre Dame, former world record holder in the 1000 meters, and bronze medal-winner in the 1976 Summer Olympics | |
| Mariel Zagunis | 2009 | 2006 NCAA champion fencer at Notre Dame and gold medal winner in the sabre competition at the 2004 and 2008 Summer Olympics; flag-bearer for the US team in the opening ceremonies of the 2012 Summer Olympics | |

- Nick Itkin (born 1999), Olympic 2x bronze medalist foil fencer, junior world champion, 2x NCAA champion for Notre Dame

== Soccer ==
| Name | Class year | Notability | Reference(s) |
|---|---|---|---|
| Matt Besler | 2008 | First player in program history to earn both first-team All-America and first-team Academic All-America honors; member of U.S. Men's National Team 2013–2015 | |
| Brittany Bock | 2009 | Midfielder for Notre Dame, member of the United States U-23 women's national soccer team | |
| Greg Dalby | 2007 | Midfielder for Notre Dame, professional soccer player for R. Charleroi S.C., and former player for the United States Men's under-20 national soccer team | |
| Justin Detter | 2004 | Striker for Notre Dame and former professional soccer player | |
| Kevin Goldthwaite | 2005 | Defender for Notre Dame and current professional soccer player for the New York Red Bulls | |
| Kerri Hanks | 2009 | Striker for Notre Dame, two-time winner of the Hermann Trophy (2006, 2008) | |
| Joseph Lapira | 2008 | Forward for Notre Dame who won the Hermann Trophy in 2006, was drafted to Toronto FC in 2008, and previously played for the Republic of Ireland national football team | |
| Dillon Powers | 2013 | Midfielder for Notre Dame, member of the United States U-20 men's national soccer team | |
| Jack Stewart | 2004 | Notre Dame defender and professional soccer player with Real Salt Lake | |

== Track and field ==
| Name | Class year | Notability | Reference(s) |
|---|---|---|---|
| Michael B. Brennan | 1986 | High hurdler and intermediate hurdler at Notre Dame | |
| Edward J. Hogan | 1923 | Pole vaulter and broad jumper at Notre Dame | |
| C. W. Martin | 1911 | Sprinter at Notre Dame, 100 and 220 yard dashes | |
| Ryan Shay | 2002 | Track and field and cross country runner at Notre Dame and 2003 United States Marathon Champion; died during the 2007 U.S. Olympic marathon trials | |
