= Steve Beuerlein =

American football player (born 1965)

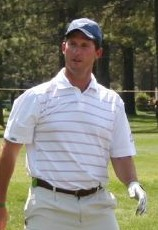
- Beuerlein at a golf tournament in 2008

No. 7, 11
- Position: Quarterback

Personal information
- Born: March 7, 1965 (age 61); Hollywood, California, U.S.
- Listed height: 6 ft 3 in (1.91 m)
- Listed weight: 220 lb (100 kg)

Career information
- High school: Servite (Anaheim, California)
- College: Notre Dame (1983–1986)
- NFL draft: 1987: 4th round, 110th overall pick
- Expansion draft: 1995: 1st round, 1st overall pick

Career history
- Los Angeles Raiders (1987–1990); Dallas Cowboys (1991–1992); Phoenix / Arizona Cardinals (1993–1994); Jacksonville Jaguars (1995); Carolina Panthers (1996–2000); Denver Broncos (2001–2003)

Awards and highlights
- Super Bowl champion (XXVII); Pro Bowl (1999); NFL passing yards leader (1999); NFL completion percentage leader (1998)

Career NFL statistics
- Passing attempts: 3,328
- Passing completions: 1,894
- Completion percentage: 56.9%
- TD–INT: 147–112
- Passing yards: 24,046
- Passer rating: 80.3
- Stats at Pro Football Reference

Stephen Taylor Beuerlein (born March 7, 1965) is an American former professional football player who was a quarterback in the National Football League (NFL). He played college football for the Notre Dame Fighting Irish. After his playing career, he became an NFL and college football analyst for CBS.

== Early life ==
In his senior year, Beuerlein led Anaheim's Servite High School to the California Interscholastic Federation 1982 Southern Section Big Five championship, where he was named player of the year. In the first game of the year he played against Ohio's famed Moeller High School. Although Servite led Moeller early in the 4th quarter, Moeller won 29–15, but Beuerlein's performance caught the eye of Notre Dame head coach Gerry Faust, who had coached for 18 years at Moeller prior to taking the Notre Dame job. After Servite went on to win its final eleven games en route to a 31–7 victory over Long Beach Poly in the CIF-SS Big 5 championship game (and a #4 national ranking), Faust offered Beuerlein a full scholarship, and he attended Notre Dame the following year.

== College career ==
As a true freshman in the 1983 Notre Dame season, the 18-year-old Beuerlein got his first start in the fourth game, relieving senior quarterback and four-year starter Blair Kiel, who had begun the season with a 1–2 record. Beuerlein started the remaining eight games of the regular season, splitting playing time with Kiel, and winning his first five starts. He lost his final three starts of the regular season in close games decided by five points or less, but the Irish' 6–5 record was good enough for a Liberty Bowl bid, where Kiel got the start for the first time since the Miami game and led the Irish to a 19–18 victory over Doug Flutie's 13th-ranked Boston College team.

Beuerlein entered his sophomore 1984 season as the starter at quarterback. In the fifth game of the season against #14 Miami, he was knocked out of the game with an injury to his throwing shoulder. He missed only one game, and started the rest of the season's games, taking repeated cortisone injections. He led the Irish to a 4–1 finish to the regular season and a 7–4 record, losing only to #11 South Carolina, and with victories at #6 LSU and #14 USC, before losing in the Aloha Bowl to #10 SMU. In that game, Beuerlein noticed a deterioration in the condition of his throwing shoulder, which had been worsening since the injury. Beuerlein also blamed the injury on throwing a school-record 18 interceptions. After an unsuccessful offseason rehab, Notre Dame sent Beuerlein to a California orthopedist in April, where the doctor discovered a bone chip in his collarbone, which had ground away much of his acromioclavicular joint. He had surgery immediately, which removed an inch of his collarbone and the entire remaining parts of his AC joint.

Five months after surgery to his throwing shoulder, Beuerlein was starting the 1985 season opener at Michigan. Beurlein was benched for the Ole Miss game in favor of sophomore backup Terry Andrysiak after throwing just three touchdowns at that point After good play coming off the bench that game, Beurlein won his starting job back.

Before Beuerlein's senior year, Faust resigned after five seasons. The university then hired Minnesota head coach Lou Holtz. Beuerlein enjoyed his best statistical season in 1986 under Holtz, throwing for 2211 yards, 13 TDs and 7 INTs. In his final collegiate game, Beuerlein threw three second-half touchdowns, helping lead the Irish to an upset over the 17th ranked USC Trojans. The win gave Beuerlein a perfect 4–0 record against the Trojans, the only Notre Dame quarterback ever to do so besides Ralph Guglielmi from 1951 to 1954.

Beuerlein started 39 out of 46 games for the Irish during his four-year career, with a 21–18 record. He graduated in 1987 with a degree in American Studies, having broken nearly every passing and total offense record in Notre Dame history.

== Professional career ==
Pre-draft measurables
Height	Weight	Arm length	Hand span	40-yard dash	10-yard split	20-yard split	20-yard shuttle	Vertical jump	Broad jump	Bench press
6 ft 2 3/8 in (1.89 m)	203 lb (92 kg)	30 in (0.76 m)	10 in (0.25 m)	5.10 s	1.69 s	2.88 s	4.63 s	23.0 in (0.58 m)	7 ft 9 in (2.36 m)	3 reps
All values from NFL Combine

=== Los Angeles Raiders ===
Beuerlein was drafted by the Los Angeles Raiders in the fourth round of the 1987 NFL draft, but suffered a season-ending injury in preseason play.

He made his NFL debut in 1988 under new head coach Mike Shanahan, starting and winning the season opener against the San Diego Chargers 24–13, his first game in Los Angeles Memorial Coliseum since upsetting USC in college two years prior. The Raiders would lose Beuerlein's next two starts in close games, including a loss to the crosstown Los Angeles Rams, where Beuerlein threw for 375 yards, then the third-highest total in Raiders history. Beurlein was eventually benched for the more experienced Jay Schroeder, who had been acquired from the Washington Redskins only one day before the season opener. Beuerlein came off the bench for Schroeder twice before regaining the starting job, losing it again near the end of the season. The Raiders finished third in the AFC West division, with a record of 7–9.

In 1989, Schroeder was named the starter. After a 1–3 start, Shanahan was fired. Under new coach Art Shell, Beuerlein started the final six games after a three-interception outing by Schroeder in a Week 10 loss to San Diego, winning the Raiders' starting job. The Raiders finished 8–8 for another third-place finish in the AFC West.

Going into the 1990 season, Beuerlein was to be the lowest-paid starting QB in the league, at a salary of $140,000. This led to a contract dispute and holdout, and although he eventually signed before the start of the season, the holdout angered Raiders owner Al Davis, who refused to allow the Raiders' coaches to play Beuerlein. Schroeder was handed the starting job with Vince Evans as the backup, and Beuerlein was held inactive for every game. To compound matters for Beuerlein, the Raiders finished 12–4, and advanced all the way to the AFC title game.

=== Dallas Cowboys ===
Less than a week before the start of the 1991 season, the Raiders traded Beuerlein to the Dallas Cowboys, who desired a back-up for Troy Aikman, in exchange for a fourth round draft choice. According to head coach Jimmy Johnson, the Cowboys had "been actively pursuing Beuerlein for quite some time", including a trade agreement worked out in January that Davis reportedly backed out of. When Aikman injured his knee in Week 13 against the Washington Redskins, Beuerlein came off the bench and threw a 4th-quarter touchdown pass to Michael Irvin, as the Cowboys held on for a 24–21 victory, defeating the 11–0 Redskins in their home stadium. He then started the remaining four games of the regular season, winning all four and leading the Cowboys to an 11–5 record, their best since the 1983 season under Tom Landry. They also made the playoffs for the first time since the 1985 season, capturing the fifth seed as a wild-card team.

With Aikmain's knee healthy enough to start the first playoff game at the Chicago Bears, Johnson decided to continue playing Beuerlein, a move that upset Aikman at the time. Beuerlein threw for 180 yards, with 1 touchdown and no interceptions in leading the Cowboys to a 17–13 win at Soldier Field. It was the Cowboys’ first road playoff win in over a decade. The following week, he started at Detroit, but was relieved by Aikman early in the game as the Cowboys would go on to lose, ending their playoff run as the Cowboys were blown out by the Detroit Lions.

In 1992, a healthy Aikman had a breakout season, and Beuerlein played sparingly but still managed to appear in all 16 regular season games. The Cowboys finished with a 13–3 record and reached Super Bowl XXVII. Beuerlein relieved Aikman with 7:06 left in the game and Dallas up by 35 points. On his last play as a Cowboy, Beuerlein fumbled the ball on a botched handoff to Derrick Gainer. The Cowboys defeated the Buffalo Bills 52–17 and Beuerlein received his first and only Super Bowl championship.

=== Phoenix / Arizona Cardinals ===
After his play in Dallas, as an unrestricted free agent entering the 1993 season Beuerlein was a highly sought-after quarterback on the free agent market. He would eventually sign a three-year, $7.5 million contract with the Phoenix Cardinals and become their new starting quarterback. After three-straight seasons of five wins or less, head coach Joe Bugel was on the hot seat before the season even began after owner Bill Bidwill gave him an ultimatum demanding that Bugel win at least nine games in order to keep his job. After the Cardinals started the season 2–6, Beuerlein was briefly benched in favor of Chris Chandler, but regained the starting job after two games. Beuerlein led the Cardinals to victories in four of their last five games, including passing for three touchdowns and a career-high 431 yards in a 30–27 overtime win at Seattle. The Cardinals finished with a 7–9 record and Bugel was fired.

Beuerlein passed for the first of his three career 3000-yard seasons in 1993, finishing in the top-10 in almost every statistical passing category, despite throwing passes in only 14 games.

The newly renamed Arizona Cardinals hired Buddy Ryan as both head coach and general manager in 1994. Beuerlein was benched after an 0–2 start. Ryan called him "one of the worst quarterbacks he had ever seen" and stated to the press that Beuerlein was "a cancer that needed to be cut out." Amid frequent changes at quarterback, Beuerlein went 3–4 as a starter as the team finished 8–8, with Ryan making him a scapegoat for the team's mediocrity.

=== Jacksonville Jaguars ===
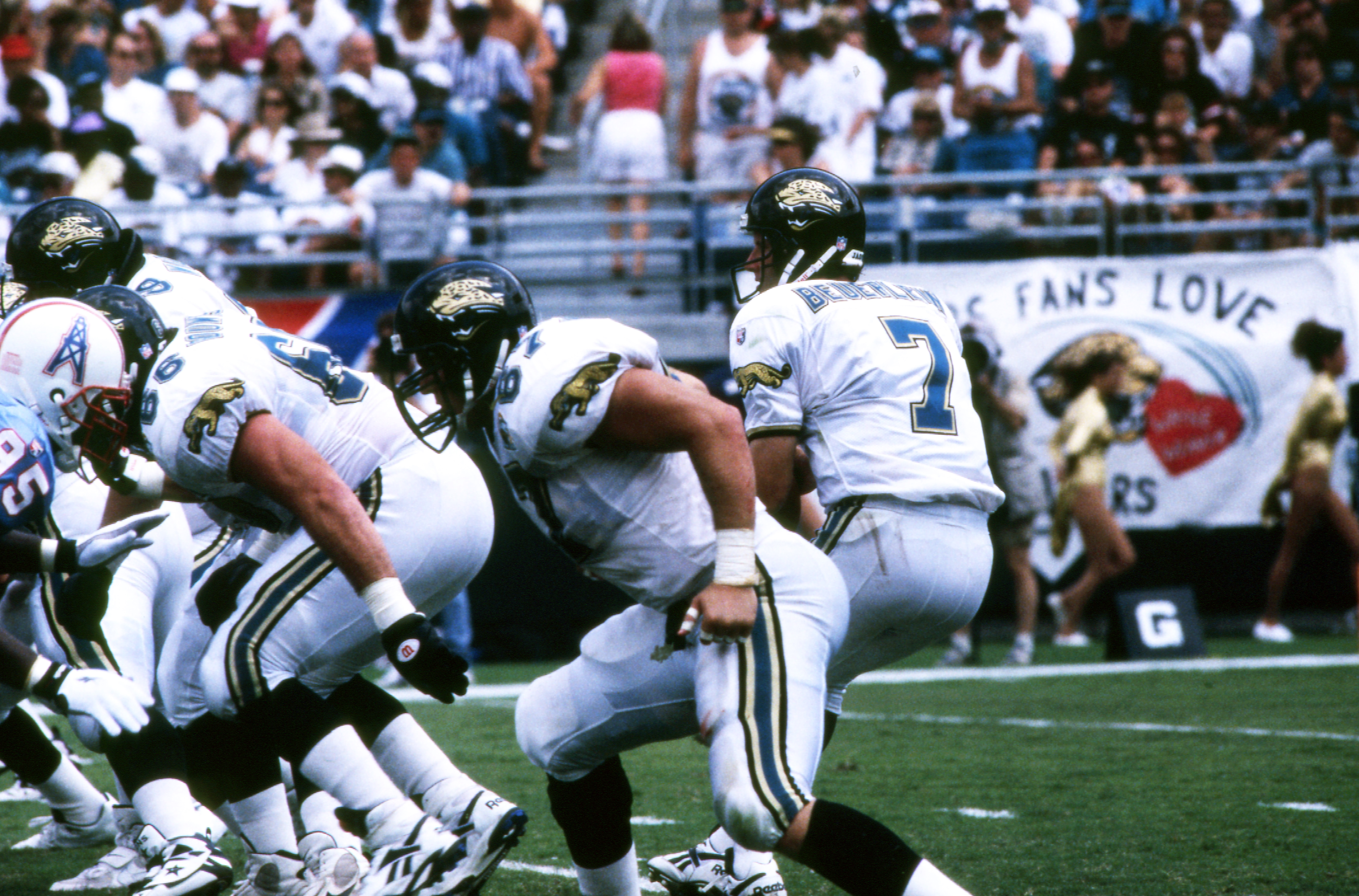
Beuerlein with the Jaguars in 1995.

At the end of the 1994 season, Ryan and Beuerlein's contentious relationship would come to an end when Ryan exposed him to the 1995 NFL expansion draft. The Jacksonville Jaguars took him with the number one selection. Beuerlein was the starting quarterback for the first game in team history, starting the first two games before spraining his right MCL in a game against the Cincinnati Bengals. While he was healthy two weeks later, and he initially started in a Week 5 game against the Houston Oilers, he would be replaced mid-game by backup Mark Brunell who would keep the starting job for the next six games. Beuerlein would not see action again until Week 11 against the Tampa Bay Buccaneers, coming off the bench for an injured Brunell in the fourth quarter, leading a team-record 96-yard touchdown drive, and throwing what was potentially the game-tying touchdown. Head coach Tom Coughlin decided to go for a two-point conversion and the win, which failed and the Jaguars lost 17–16. Beuerlein started three of the next four games in relief of Brunell – all losses – as the Jaguars finished their inaugural season with a 4–12 record. Beuerlein reportedly had a confrontational relationship with head coach Coughlin, and finished the season as the third quarterback behind rookie Rob Johnson. As he was in the last year of his original three-year deal with the Cardinals, after the season he became a free agent.

=== Carolina Panthers ===
==== 1996 season ====
Before the 1996 season, the Carolina Panthers signed Beuerlein to a three-year contract, as a backup to second-year QB Kerry Collins.

He made four starts in relief of an injured Collins, going 3–1, finishing the year with eight touchdowns and only two interceptions, and a passer rating of 93.5.

==== 1997 season ====
After an injury to Kerry Collins in the beginning of the 1997 season, Beuerlein started the first two regular season games going 1–1. Beurelein started another game and occasionally played in relief of Collins. Beuerlein also served as a mentor to Collins, relating his stories of watching other young quarterbacks struggle in their early years before becoming stars.

Beuerlein started three games and played in seven, as the Panthers finished with a 7–9 record.

==== 1998 season ====
In 1998, Beuerlein gained the starting job permanently in Week 5 after Collins' on-field and off-field problems continued, and he benched himself after an 0–4 start and was ultimately released one week later.

Beuerlein threw 17 touchdowns and 12 interceptions, completing 63% of passes for 2613 yards, however the Panthers finished with a 4–12 record and head coach Dom Capers was fired.

==== 1999 season ====
In 1999, Beuerlein beat newly acquired Jeff Lewis for the starting job.

In Week 14, Carolina visited Green Bay in their first game at Lambeau Field since the 1996 NFC Championship Game. Beuerlein, who had served as Collins's backup but did not play in that January 1997 tilt, passed for a then franchise-record 373 yards. Beuerlein won the game against the Packers on a last-second quarterback draw. He later stated that the draw play was the favorite of his career and that "people still ask me about that play almost every single day."

In the final week against the Saints, Beuerlein threw a team record five touchdown passes in a win, but the Panthers failed to make the playoffs due to the NFL's tie breaker rules.

Beuerlein's 4,436 passing yards led the league, and at the time was the 11th-highest passing yardage total ever. He also led the NFL with 343 completions, and his 94.6 passer rating and 36 touchdown passes were second only to the 1999 MVP Kurt Warner.

Beuerlein made the Pro Bowl for the first and only time in his career, tying offensive guard Bob Young for the most seasons in the league (13) before making his first Pro Bowl.

==== 2000 season ====
Beuerlein entered the 2000 season as the starter with little competition. He threw for 3,730 yards, but was sacked a league-leading 62 times, which was then tied for the second-most sacks ever on a quarterback in a season. Beuerlein also threw a career-high 18 interceptions. The Panthers finished with their third 7–9 record in six seasons.

==== 2001 season ====
Beuerlein was released two months into the offseason by head coach George Seifert. Seifert named Jeff Lewis to take over as the starter, but a bad preseason by Lewis led to rookie Chris Weinke to be designated as starter when Lewis was cut Aug 31. The Panthers won their season opener against the Minnesota Vikings. The 2001 Panthers then went on to lose all 15 of their remaining games, finishing 1–15, and Seifert was fired after the season.

==== Panthers franchise records ====
During his five seasons in Carolina, Beuerlein set almost every Panthers passing record, including most career attempts (1,723), completions (1,041), passing yards (12,690), passing touchdowns (86), highest completion percentage (60.4%), and highest passer rating (87.7), some of which have since been broken by Jake Delhomme and Cam Newton. Those that remain include:

- Career passer rating (87.7)
- Seasons with 4000+ passing yards (1; with Cam Newton)
- Single-season passing yards (4,436 in 1999)
- Single-season passing touchdowns (36 in 1999)
- Single-season passing attempts (571 in 1999)
- Single-season passing completions (343 in 1999)
- Single-season completion percentage (63.0% in 1999)
- Single-season times sacked (62 in 2000)
- Single-season yards per game (277.3 in 1999)
- Single-season 300+ passing yard games (5 in 1999)
- Most touchdown passes in a game (5, 2000-01-02 NOR; with Cam Newton x3)
- As of August 2017, he holds three of the top eight single-game passing yard totals in Carolina team history (373, 368, and 364).

=== Denver Broncos ===
Before the 2001 season, Beuerlein signed with the Denver Broncos to back up Brian Griese, reuniting him with Mike Shanahan, his Raiders coach from the 1980s. In 2001, Beuerlein missed his first full season due to injury since his rookie year, but returned in 2002, starting three games and appearing in eight, including a week 11 game against the Seahawks where Beuerlein came off the bench and threw two 4th-quarter touchdowns on his only two pass attempts of the game.

Before the 2003 season, after the Broncos signed former Cardinals QB Jake Plummer to be their new starter, Beuerlein considered retiring at age 38, but decided to play one more year after Shanahan personally visited his home and asked him to stay. He appeared in four games and started two in relief of an injured Plummer, and helped the Broncos to a 5–1 start before his season ended in a Week 7 game at the undefeated Minnesota Vikings. Beuerlein played poorly, throwing three interceptions as the Vikings blitzed him relentlessly, sacking him five times and knocking him down on numerous other occasions. He was knocked out of the game late in the third quarter with a fractured finger on his throwing hand on an incompletion, with Danny Kanell taking over for the rest of the game. Although the injury was expected to keep him out for only a maximum of six weeks, the Broncos needed the roster spot and he was placed on injured reserve, ending his season and ultimately his career.

=== Retirement ===
Although the Broncos wanted him to return for his 18th NFL season, at age 39, Beuerlein decided to retire from professional football. Only one week after his finger injury, Beuerlein reflected on the many struggles he had to endure in his NFL career to Sports Illustrated's Peter King. Beuerlein said, "Hey, I've been in the wrong place at the wrong time a lot. But I was a fourth-round pick. To last 15, 16, 17 years in the league, what can I complain about? I've lived the dream a long time. The only thing I'd change is how it ended."

In July 2004, Beuerlein signed a one-day contract with the Panthers to retire as a member of the team. Commenting on the decision to retire with the team, Beuerlein stated "This in my mind was the way it was meant to be. I couldn't think of a better way to bring this 17-year run to an end. My heart has always been here with this organization and when I sat back and decided I wanted to step down, there was no doubt I wanted to do it as a Carolina Panther."

== Career statistics ==
=== NFL ===
Legend
	Led the league
**Bold**	Career high

Year	Team	Games			Passing							Rushing		
Year	Team	GP	GS	Record	Cmp	Att	Pct	Yds	TD	Int	Rtg	Att	Yds	TD
1987	RAI	0	0	–	Did not play due to injury									
1988	RAI	10	8	4–4	105	238	44.1	1,643	8	7	66.6	30	35	0
1989	RAI	10	7	4–3	108	217	49.8	1,677	13	9	78.4	16	39	0
1990	RAI	0	0	–	DNP									
1991	DAL	8	4	4–0	68	137	49.6	909	5	2	77.2	7	-14	0
1992	DAL	**16**	0	–	12	18	66.7	154	0	1	69.7	4	-7	0
1993	PHO	**16**	14	6–8	258	418	61.7	3,164	18	17	82.5	22	45	0
1994	ARI	9	7	3–4	130	255	51.0	1,545	5	9	61.6	22	39	1
1995	JAX	7	6	1–5	71	142	50.0	952	4	7	60.5	5	32	0
1996	CAR	8	4	3–1	69	123	56.1	879	8	2	93.5	12	17	0
1997	CAR	7	3	1–2	89	153	58.2	1,032	6	3	83.6	4	32	0
1998	CAR	12	12	4–8	216	343	**63.0**	2,613	17	12	88.2	22	26	0
1999	CAR	**16**	**16**	**8–8**	**343**	**571**	60.1	**4,436**	**36**	15	**94.6**	27	**124**	**2**
2000	CAR	**16**	**16**	7–9	324	533	60.8	3,730	19	**18**	79.7	**44**	106	1
2001	DEN	0	0	–	Did not play due to injury									
2002	DEN	8	3	1–2	68	117	58.1	925	6	5	82.7	5	9	1
2003	DEN	4	2	1–1	33	63	52.4	389	2	5	49.0	5	13	0
Total		147	102	47–55	1,894	3,328	56.9	24,046	147	112	80.3	225	496	5

=== College ===
Season	Team	Games	Passing								Rushing			
Season	Team	GP	Cmp	Att	Pct	Yds	Avg	TD	Int	Rtg	Att	Yds	Avg	TD
1983	Notre Dame	10	75	145	51.7	1,061	7.3	4	6	114.0	23	-9	-0.4	0
1984	Notre Dame	10	140	232	60.3	1,920	8.3	7	**18**	124.3	**58**	-75	-1.3	**1**
1985	Notre Dame	**11**	107	214	50.0	1,335	6.2	3	13	94.9	43	-19	-0.4	**1**
1986	Notre Dame	**11**	**151**	**259**	**58.3**	**2,211**	**8.5**	**13**	7	**141.2**	53	**35**	**0.7**	**1**
Career		42	473	850	55.6	6,527	7.7	27	44	120.3	178	-62	-0.4	3

== Football analyst ==
In 2004, Beuerlein joined CBS Sports as a game analyst for The NFL on CBS, where he travels each week during the season to NFL venues in order to provide color commentary for games. Beuerlein also occasionally calls college football games for CBS. In 2024 Beuerlein became the Compass Media Networks Dallas Cowboys radio analyst, replacing longtime legend Danny White who had held the position since the broadcasts began in 2011.
