= Terry Andrysiak =

American football player (born 1965)

No. 2
- Position: Quarterback

Personal information
- Born: December 4, 1965 (age 60)
- Listed height: 6 ft 1 in (1.85 m)
- Listed weight: 184 lb (83 kg)

Career information
- High school: St. Frances Cabrini (Allen Park, Michigan)
- College: Notre Dame Fighting Irish (1984–1987)

Terrence J. Andrysiak (born 1965) is an American former football quarterback for St. Frances Cabrini High School and the University of Notre Dame. He is currently a financial executive for The Horizon Group, Raymond James in Fenton, Michigan.

In high school, Andrysiak played baseball, basketball, and track and field, but he particularly excelled in football. During his senior season in 1983, he completed 95 of 153 passes for 1,859 yards, 21 touchdowns, and only three interceptions. He was named an Adidas Scholastic Prep All-American and a Sporting News Top 100 Football Recruit.

As a sophomore at Notre Dame, Andrysiak won his first game as a starting quarterback while filling in for an injured Steve Beuerlein—a 37–14 victory over Mississippi.

At the beginning of his senior year, Andrysiak was given the starting job by head coach Lou Holtz over future NFL player Kent Graham, and would win his first three starts, including a 26–7 victory at ninth-ranked Michigan and a 31–8 victory over seventeenth-ranked (and eventual Rose Bowl champions) Michigan State. His eleven-yard touchdown pass to Heisman Trophy winner Tim Brown at Michigan is regarded as one of the most spectacular receptions ever made by the wide receiver.

However, Andrysiak's season was truncated by a separated shoulder in a loss to Pittsburgh. He returned to start the final game of the season, a 35–10 loss to Texas A&M in the Cotton Bowl Classic. After graduation, he played for four years in the CFL with the Hamilton Tiger-Cats and the Ottawa Rough Riders.

Andrysiak was inducted into Detroit's Catholic High School League Hall of Fame in 1988, and the Allen Park Sports Hall of Fame in 2008. He returned to his high school as the head football coach for three seasons and qualified for the state playoffs in 1995, his final year. He also coached one year at Niles High School, in Niles, Michigan, in 1996.
