= Tim Koegel =

American football player (born 1958)

Tim Koegel (born October 28, 1958) is a former American football quarterback in the USFL who played for the Chicago Blitz. He played college football for the Notre Dame Fighting Irish. He became a starting quarterback at the start of the 2nd half of the 1979 Cotton Bowl Classic when Joe Montana was in the locker room suffering from hypothermia before being fed with chicken soup to return to the game.
