= Mike Courey =

American football player (1959–2007)

No. 2
- Positions: Halfback, flanker, quarterback

Personal information
- Born: August 11, 1959; Watertown, South Dakota, U.S.
- Died: December 11, 2007 (aged 48); Sioux City, Iowa, U.S.
- Listed height: 6 ft 2 in (1.88 m)
- Listed weight: 195 lb (88 kg)

Career information
- High school: Bishop Heelan Catholic (Sioux City, Iowa)
- College: Notre Dame Fighting Irish (1977–1980)

Michael J. Courey (August 11, 1959 – December 11, 2007) was an American football player and a starting quarterback for the University of Notre Dame.

He was born to a teenage mother in Watertown, South Dakota, and at five weeks of age was adopted by Michael and Helen (Schlote) Courey of Sioux City, Iowa. At Bishop Heelan Catholic High School he became an All-State athlete in football, basketball and baseball, and was a Parade All-American when he was given a football scholarship to Notre Dame in 1977.

In his freshman year Courey played halfback for the national champion team, and opened eyes when he completed an option pass for 24 yards in a comeback win at Clemson. In 1978, he was moved to flanker, and in 1979 became a backup quarterback.

As a senior in 1980, Courey won the No. 1 quarterback job and went 3–0 as a starter, including wins over ninth-ranked Purdue and fourteenth-ranked Michigan. But then coach Dan Devine, who had a reputation for being fickle with his QBs, decided to give the starting job to freshman Blair Kiel, believing the underclassman to have a stronger arm. Courey would later lead a tying touchdown drive against Georgia Tech, but would never start another game.

Courey earned his degree in business management, and later became president of the International Brotherhood of Painters and Allied Trades Union Local 214 in Sioux City.

In 2006 Courey was found to have a malignant schwannoma tumor in his back. He succumbed to the cancer nineteen months later, leaving behind three daughters and a son.
