= Bud Bonar =

American football player and coach (1906–1970)

Biographical details
- Born: July 26, 1906; Bellaire, Ohio, U.S.
- Died: November 21, 1970 (aged 64)

Playing career
- 1933: Notre Dame
- Position: Quarterback

Coaching career (HC unless noted)
- ?: Cincinnati (assistant)
- 1949–1958: Bellaire High

Reyman Edward "Bud" Bonar (July 26, 1906 – November 21, 1970) was an American football player and coach from Bellaire, Ohio.

As a senior at Bellaire High School in 1926, Bonar was the football team captain and quarterback. His team posted an undefeated record of 9–0–1 and was the champion of the Ohio Valley Athletic Conference. After graduation, he enrolled at West Virginia University but later would transfer to Notre Dame.

As the quarterback for Notre Dame under head coach Hunk Anderson, his career highlight occurred when his drop-kick extra point enabled Notre Dame to defeat 9–0 Army by the score of 13–12 on December 2, 1933, in Yankee Stadium.

After graduation, Bonar played one year of professional football in the CFL before becoming an assistant coach at the University of Cincinnati. He would return to coach the team at his old high school from 1949 to 1958, and would win the OVAC championship twice, in 1950 and 1954.

Bonar held the position of Bellaire's athletic director when he died of a heart attack in 1970, purportedly while watching a broadcast of the Notre Dame vs. LSU game.
