= George Cartier =

American football player and lumber baron (1869–1944)

- Born: May 26, 1869; Ludington, Michigan
- Died: October 21, 1944 (aged 75); Tacoma, Washington
- Parent(s): Antoine E. Cartier; Eliza N. Ayers

George Robinson Cartier (May 26, 1869 – October 21, 1944) was an American football player and lumber baron in the Pacific northwest.

Cartier was the quarterback for the first game in the history of the Notre Dame football program — a 0–8 loss to Michigan on November 23, 1887. George was the younger brother of philanthropist Warren A. Cartier, for whom the university's Cartier Field was named.

After graduating from Notre Dame in South Bend, Indiana, Cartier relocated to South Bend, Washington, where he became co-founder and manager of the South Bend Mills & Timber Company, and was elected mayor of the city in 1910. In 1919, he built the Copper Creek Lodge near Mount Rainier in Ashford, Washington, and lived there with his wife and daughter until 1931.
