= Matt LoVecchio =

American football player (born 1982)

No. 10
- Position: Quarterback

Personal information
- Born: February 2, 1982 (age 44); Englewood, New Jersey, U.S.
- Listed height: 6 ft 3 in (1.91 m)
- Listed weight: 216 lb (98 kg)

Career information
- High school: Bergen Catholic (Oradell, New Jersey)
- College: Notre Dame (2000–2001); Indiana (2002–2004)
- NFL draft: 2005: undrafted

Career history
- New York Giants (2005)*
- * Offseason or practice squad member only

Matthew Lawrence LoVecchio (born February 2, 1982) is a former starting quarterback for the University of Notre Dame football team in 2000–01, and for Indiana University in 2003–04.

== Early life ==
LoVecchio grew up in Franklin Lakes, New Jersey. He attended Bergen Catholic High School in Oradell, New Jersey, where he earned four letters as a football quarterback, throwing for 3,400 passing yards and 48 touchdowns, and was named an Honorable Mention pick on USA Today's All-American Prep Team.

== College ==
As a freshman at the University of Notre Dame in 2000, LoVecchio assumed the starting quarterback role following an injury to Arnaz Battle and two starts by interim QB Gary Godsey, a converted tight-end. He won his first seven games as a starter, during which the team averaged over 400 yards of total offense and 36 points per game. His stats for the season included 1,118 passing yards, eleven touchdowns and only one interception out of 158 attempts. The team was rewarded with a berth in the Fiesta Bowl against Oregon State.

However, the Beavers dominated the Irish in a 41–9 victory. The following year, LoVecchio struggled, losing his first two games and eventually yielding the starting job to Carlyle Holiday. Head coach Bob Davie was fired at the end of the 2001 season, and when new head coach Tyrone Willingham did not name LoVecchio as the starter in the spring of 2002, the quarterback decided to transfer to Indiana University. LoVecchio stated of his leaving Notre Dame, "It's just a personal decision, that's all I'm going to say right now."

After sitting out the 2002 season per NCAA regulations, LoVecchio started eleven games for the Hoosiers in 2003, completing 155 of 291 passes for 1,778 yards and three touchdowns, including an eight-yard touchdown run in the final seconds of a 17–14 win at Illinois. In 2004, he completed 153 of 271 passes for 1,951 yards and thirteen touchdowns.

=== College career statistics ===
Notre Dame Fighting Irish
Season	Passing							Rushing			
Season	Comp	Att	Yards	Pct.	TD	Int	QB rating	Att	Yards	Avg	TD
2000	73	125	980	58.4	11	1	151.7	72	300	4.2	2
2001	34	69	287	49.3	1	4	77.4	18	−17	−0.9	0
Indiana Hoosiers
2002	Redshirt										
2003	155	291	1,778	53.3	3	9	101.8	97	−7	−0.1	2
2004	153	271	1,951	56.5	13	7	127.6	93	112	1.2	2
Totals	415	756	4,996	54.9	28	21	117.1	280	388	1.4	6

== Professional career ==
LoVecchio was not drafted by any NFL franchise. He signed on with the New York Giants during training camp in 2005, but failed to make the final roster. He was offered a chance to play in NFL Europe, but declined and retired from football.

== Personal life ==
After retiring, LoVecchio worked for Merrill Lynch and Bank of America, now working as an institutional bonds trader for Wells Fargo in New York City.
