= Bill Mohn =

American football player (1899–1952)

Notre Dame Fighting Irish
- Position: Quarterback

Career information
- College: Notre Dame (1918)

William Kirk Mohn (April 22, 1899 – 1952) was an American football player for the University of Notre Dame. He was born in South Bend, Indiana.

In Knute Rockne's first year as the head football coach at Notre Dame in 1918, Mohn was the quarterback for a very thin squad that had been decimated due to the military enrollment for World War I. The team went 3–1–2 in a shortened season that was declared "unofficial" by the university. Among Mohn's career highlights were scoring the lone touchdown for the Irish in a 7–7 tie against Great Lakes Navy and a 73-yard punt return for a touchdown in a 26–6 win at Purdue.
