= Jim Brady (quarterback) =

American football player and broadcasting entrepreneur (1907–1984)

No. 57
- Position: Quarterback

Personal information
- Born: August 11, 1907; Oklahoma, US
- Died: January 12, 1984 (aged 76); Hawaii, US
- Listed height: 5 ft 7 in (1.70 m)
- Listed weight: 145 lb (66 kg)

Career information
- High school: Pocatello; Pocatello, Idaho
- College: Notre Dame Fighting Irish (1927–1928)

James Murphy Brady (August 11, 1907 – January 12, 1984), a grandson of Idaho governor James H. Brady, was an American football player and broadcasting entrepreneur.

After graduating from Pocatello High School in Idaho, Brady tried out for the football team at Notre Dame, but was told by coach Knute Rockne that he was far too small. But over time his persistence paid off, and in 1927 he was named the starting quarterback. Brady was the quarterback for the legendary "Win one for the Gipper" game against Army on November 10, 1928—dramatized in the film Knute Rockne, All American.

Returning to Idaho Falls in 1933, he joined the family business at The Post Register newspaper. After serving in the United States Army in World War II, Brady founded the radio station KIFI in Idaho Falls in 1947, and eventually the television station KIFI-TV. He served as president of Upper Valley Cable from 1969 until his death in 1984.
