= Chuck Jaskwhich =

American football player and coach (1911–1988)

Charles Joseph Jaskwhich (March 4, 1911 – January 12, 1988) was an American football player and coach.

== Early life ==
Jaskwhich was born in Kenosha, Wisconsin, to Polish immigrant parents. He attended Kenosha High School where he graduated in 1929. He was a prolific athlete and he lettered nine times in track, football and basketball. He served as a three-sport captain his senior year. Jaskwhich attended Notre Dame University, where he played on the last Fighting Irish football squad coached by Knute Rockne in 1930. After quarterback Frank Carideo graduated Jaskwhich was the top candidate to replace him. In the wake of Rockne's death in 1931, Heartley Anderson took over the head coaching position and named Jaskwhich as a two-year starter at quarterback. He would post a record of 13–4–1. Jaskwhich also played for the Fighting Irish basketball team.

== Coaching career ==
After graduation Jaskwhich accepted the position of head football coach for the Holy Cross Tigers in New Orleans, and then in 1938 he was hired as both head basketball coach and football backfield coach for Ole Miss, where he spent five years. During World War II, he served in a temporary capacity as the assistant football coach for the Naval pre-flight school on the University of Georgia campus. In 1945 Jaskwhich became the backfield coach under Clem Crowe on the Iowa Hawkeyes football team at the University of Iowa. After Crowe left Iowa to go to the Buffalo Bills of the All-America Football Conference, Jaskwhich became the head coach at Iowa. In 1946 Jaskwhich joined Crowe as a scout for the bills 1946 and from 1947–49 he was the Bill's backfield coach.

In 1949, he returned to Kenosha to coach football and direct the athletic programs at Mary D. Bradford High School. He also coached the basketball and track teams and his teams won the Big 8 title three times and State title once. He retired from the Kenosha school system in 1980.

On August 3, 1953 Jaskwhich saved the life of a twelve-year-old drowning victim, Mary Jo Parisea, who was swimming on Lake Michigan at Alford Park in Kenosha. The girl's friend was also rescued by bystanders, but her mother, Claire Parisea, died of drowning.

The Charles "Chuck" Jaskwhich Stadium at Indian Trail High School and Academy in Kenosha is named in Jaskwhich's honor.
