= Bob Hargrave =

American football player (1920–2014)

Personal information
- Born: May 8, 1920
- Died: July 28, 2014 (aged 94)

Career information
- College: Notre Dame (1940)

Robert Webb Hargrave (May 8, 1920 – July 28, 2014) was an American football player for the University of Notre Dame.

As a quarterback for Reitz Memorial High School in Evansville, Indiana, Hargrave led his team to a record of 32–0–5.

At the University of Notre Dame, Hargrave became the starting quarterback for Elmer Layden's final season as head coach in 1940. He would post a 7–2 record and earn Honorable Mention All-American honors. After graduation, he spent four years serving in the United States Navy during World War II. On November 11, 1944, he married Florence Molyneaux in San Francisco, California.

Following the war, the couple moved to Florence's home town of Chicago, Illinois, where their first two children were born. In 1948, Hargrave moved his family back to Evansville, where they had five additional children.

Hargrave was inducted into the Indiana Football Hall of Fame on November 30, 1979.
