= Pat Steenberge =

American football quarterback

Patrick W. Steenberge is a former American football quarterback who played at Cathedral Preparatory School (Erie, Pennsylvania) and at the University of Notre Dame (South Bend, Indiana).

He is the owner and operator of Global Football, which organizes competitive events for young amateur athletes worldwide. Global Football is the largest exporter of American football, having produced games and events in 28 countries since 1996. He was previously Director of Corporate Development for the National Cutting Horse Association in Fort Worth, Texas.

Following the graduation of Joe Theismann from Notre Dame, Steenberge was named the starting quarterback at the beginning of the 1971 season. He won his only two starts—a 50–7 rout of Northwestern and an 8–7 comeback victory over Purdue—before a leg injury sidelined him.

Steenberge has remained active in the Notre Dame athletics program. He is a mainstay at the annual Alumni Flag Football Game during the Blue-Gold scrimmage in the spring, and in 2003 he began the Notre Dame Football Fantasy Camp, where amateurs can play a flag football game in Notre Dame Stadium in an authentic gameday environment, led by former players and coaches.
