= Red Edwards =

American football player and coach (1904–1981)

Biographical details
- Born: March 15, 1904; Weston, West Virginia, U.S.
- Died: December 22, 1981 (aged 77); Weston, West Virginia, U.S.

Playing career

Football
- 1924–1926: Notre Dame
- Position: Quarterback

Coaching career (HC unless noted)

Football
- 1929–1931: Saint Vincent (assistant)
- 1932–1946: Saint Vincent

Basketball
- 1933–1950: Saint Vincent

Head coaching record
- Overall: 60–29–12 (football); 110–146 (basketball)

Eugene Hoffman "Red" Edwards (March 15, 1904 – December 22, 1981) was an American college football player and coach.

After graduating from Weston High School in Weston, West Virginia, Edwards played quarterback for Knute Rockne at the University of Notre Dame. As a two-year starter, he led the team to a record of 7–2–1 in 1925, and 9–1 as a captain in 1926.

Edwards served as an assistant football coached at Saint Vincent College in Latrobe, Pennsylvania for three season under Clem Crowe before succeeding him as head football coach in 1926. Edwards was later offered the head coaching position for the Pittsburgh Steelers by owner Art Rooney, but he declined. In 1956, he and his wife Sarah (née Brewster) returned to his home town of Weston to accept a position with Citizens Bank, where he eventually became chairman of the board of directors in 1968.

Edwards was inducted into the West Virginia Sports Hall of Fame in 1970. He died on December 22, 1981, in Weston.
