= Robert Williams (quarterback) =

American football player (1938–1990)

No. 9
- Position: Quarterback

Personal information
- Born: 1938; Wilkes-Barre, Pennsylvania, U.S.
- Died: July 21, 1990 (aged 51–52)
- Listed height: 6 ft 2 in (1.88 m)
- Listed weight: 190 lb (86 kg)

Career information
- High school: G.A.R. Memorial (Wilkes-Barre)
- College: Notre Dame
- NFL draft: 1959: 28th round, 332nd overall pick

Career history
- 1959: Chicago Bears

Dr. Robert "Bob" Williams (c. 1938 – July 21, 1990) was an American football player for the University of Notre Dame.

Williams won three championships with G.A.R. Memorial High School in Wilkes-Barre, Pennsylvania. From his years playing for Terry Brennan at Notre Dame, Williams is best remembered for ending the record 47-game winning streak of the Oklahoma Sooners with a 7–0 victory on November 16, 1957.

Williams was drafted in the 28th round by the Chicago Bears in 1959 (coincidentally, he was the second Notre Dame QB with the name "Bob Williams" to be selected by the Bears during the same decade), but instead he chose to enroll at the University of Pittsburgh School of Medicine. He was inducted into the Pennsylvania Sports Hall of Fame in 2002. His son Brian Williams played center for the New York Giants from 1989 to 1999. His grandson, Maxx Williams, is a tight end who was drafted in the second round of the 2015 NFL draft by the Baltimore Ravens.
