= Angus Daniel McDonald =

American railroad executive (1878–1941)

Personal information
- Nationality: American
- Citizenship: United States
- Born: April 14, 1878
- Died: November 15, 1941 (aged 63)
- Education: University of Notre Dame
- Occupation(s): Railroad executive, athlete

Sport
- Sport: Baseball, American football
- Position: First baseman (baseball), Quarterback (football)
- University team: Notre Dame Fighting Irish

Angus Daniel McDonald (April 14, 1878 – November 15, 1941) was an American railroad executive. He was president of the Southern Pacific Company, the parent company of the Southern Pacific Railroad.

McDonald attended the University of Notre Dame, where he was the first baseman and team captain for the baseball team, and both the quarterback and placekicker for the football team in 1899. McDonald was the first kicker at the university to use a holder (a technique known then as the "Princeton Kick") rather than the drop kick.

In 1931, McDonald was named a Knight of Malta by Pope Pius XI.

In World War II, the United States Liberty ship SS Angus McDonald was named in his honor.
