= Frank Budka =

American football player (born 1942)

No. 45, 21
- Positions: Quarterback, Safety

Personal information
- Born: March 20, 1942 (age 84); Cleveland, Ohio, U.S.
- Listed height: 6 ft 0 in (1.83 m)
- Listed weight: 194 lb (88 kg)

Career information
- High school: Pompano Beach (Pompano Beach, Florida)
- College: Notre Dame (1960-1963)
- NFL draft: 1964: 4th round, 56th overall pick

Career history
- Los Angeles Rams (1964); Wheeling Ironmen (1966)

Career NFL statistics
- Interceptions: 2
- Fumble recoveries: 1
- Stats at Pro Football Reference

Frank Charles Budka (born March 20, 1942) is an American former football quarterback for Pompano Beach High School in Florida, and the University of Notre Dame, doubling as a defensive back during this single platoon era of college football.

Drafted in the 1964 NFL draft, Budka played professionally for one season in the National Football League (NFL) for the Los Angeles Rams as a safety.

== Biography ==
=== Early life ===
Frank Budka was born March 20, 1942, in Cleveland, Ohio. His family moved to Florida when Frank was a boy and he attended Pompano Beach High School in Pompano Beach.

A gifted athlete from his early years, Budka played quarterback for the Pompano Beach Junior Varsity football team in 1957 and starting for the varsity in 1958 and 1959. He also played basketball, initially starting at forward for the Golden Tornadoes before moving to the guard position.

=== Collegiate years ===
Budka was recruited by Notre Dame University, heading to South Bend in the fall of 1960, where he was installed as the starting quarterback for the freshman team. He was moved to the varsity team for the 1961 season, where he was listed as #2 on the depth chart behind future NFL quarterback junior Daryle Lamonica of Fresno, California. With the Fighting Irish coming off a disappointing 2–8 season in 1960, the quarterback job seemed achievable for Budka.

This being the era of the one-platoon system in college football, both starter Lamonica and reserve Budka saw game action throughout the 1961 and 1962 seasons. Budka would play all ten games in each of those seasons, used as a standard passing quarterback in the former year — going 40-for-95 with three touchdowns against an astounding 14 interceptions as a sophomore.

During his 1962 junior season — during which Daryle Lamonica was a senior — Budka saw far more limited duty, attempting just nine passes for the year, somehow managing to accumulate more interceptions (3) than completions (2). He was used primarily as a change of pace runner.

=== Professional career ===
Originally drafted by the Chicago Bears at the end of the fourth round of the 1964 NFL draft, Budka was part of a 3-for-1 player trade with the Rams that brought former Pro Bowl running back Jon Arnett to Chicago in August of that year.

Budka saw game action in all 14 games for the Rams in the 1964 season as a safety, intercepting two passes and recovering one fumble.
