= Steve Sitko =

American football and basketball player (1917–2003)

Personal information
- Born: November 18, 1917 Fort Wayne, Indiana, U.S.
- Died: January 8, 2003 (aged 85) Akron, Ohio, U.S.
- Listed height: 6 ft 0 in (1.83 m)
- Listed weight: 185 lb (84 kg)

Career information
- High school: Central (Fort Wayne, Indiana)
- College: Notre Dame (1937–1940)
- Position: Guard

Career history
- 1940–1941: Akron Goodyear Wingfoots
- 1941–1944: Akron Collegians
- 1942–1943: Akron Goodyear Wingfoots
- 1943–1944: Dayton Bombers
- 1944: Cleveland Allmen Transfers
- 1947–1948: Akron Collegians

Steven Joseph Sitko (November 16, 1917 – January 8, 2003) was an American football player for the Notre Dame Fighting Irish, and a professional basketball player.

As a student at Fort Wayne Central High School, Sitko was best known for his basketball skills, earning the Gimbel Prize for scholastics and sportsmanship in 1936 and reaching the state finals.

Sitko became the starting quarterback at Notre Dame for two seasons, and would often confuse broadcasters when running Elmer Layden's "S" backfield, where all of the backs would be heavily involved in all aspects of the running and passing attack. His teams finished 8-1 (ranked #5) in 1938 and 7-2 (ranked #13) in 1939. He was named to the 1939 College Football All Polish-American Team.

Although he was selected by the Washington Redskins in the 22nd round of the 1940 NFL draft, Sitko chose instead to play in the National Basketball League for the Akron Goodyear Wingfoots. Meanwhile, his cousin Emil Sitko would have a stellar career at Notre Dame as a halfback under Frank Leahy.

Sitko was inducted into the Indiana Basketball Hall of Fame in 1997.
