= Don Hamilton (American football) =

American football and lacrosse player, football referee

Profile
- Position: Quarterback

Personal information
- Born: November 14, 1887; Columbus, Ohio, U.S.
- Died: June 2, 1959 (aged 71)

Career information
- College: Notre Dame

Career history
- 1913: Shelby Blues
- 1914: Canton Professionals
- 1915: Canton Bulldogs

Awards and highlights
- Ohio League Champion (1915)

Donald Munson Hamilton (November 14, 1887 – June 2, 1959) was an American football and baseball player and a football referee.

As a two-year starter at quarterback at the University of Notre Dame, Hamilton amassed a record of 15–1–1. A highlight of his undefeated 1909 season was the school's first victory over Michigan in nine games—an 11–3 triumph over a Fielding H. Yost team that earned Notre Dame the title "Champions of the West".

In 1910, Hamilton's eligibility was suspended for having played professional baseball with the Louisville Colonels, but he returned as a backup quarterback in 1911 and threw the school's first game-winning touchdown pass—a 35-yard strike to Lee Matthews—for a 6–0 victory against Pittsburgh.

After graduation, Hamilton played professionally in the Ohio League, first for the Shelby Blues in 1913, and then for the Canton Professionals/Bulldogs in 1914 and 1915. By the early 1920s, he had become a referee for pro games played in the Ohio Valley, and in 1921 was banned from officiating games for the Ironton Tanks after admitting that he had watched them "more closely" than their opponents.

By the mid-1930s, Hamilton had become a college football referee for the Big Ten Conference.
