= Blair Kiel =

American football player (1961–2012)

No. 16, 5, 10, 6, 11
- Position: Quarterback

Personal information
- Born: November 29, 1961; Columbus, Indiana, U.S.
- Died: April 8, 2012 (aged 50); Columbus, Indiana, U.S.
- Listed height: 6 ft 0 in (1.83 m)
- Listed weight: 200 lb (91 kg)

Career information
- High school: Columbus East
- College: Notre Dame
- NFL draft: 1984: 11th round, 281st overall pick

Career history
- Tampa Bay Buccaneers (1984–1985); Indianapolis Colts (1986–1987); Green Bay Packers (1988–1991); Atlanta Falcons (1992)*; Toronto Argonauts (1992); Cincinnati Rockers (1993)
- * Offseason or practice squad member only

Career NFL statistics
- Passing attempts: 193
- Passing completions: 108
- Completion percentage: 56.0%
- TD–INT: 8–7
- Passing yards: 1,296
- Passer rating: 51.8
- Stats at Pro Football Reference
- Stats at ArenaFan.com

Blair Armstrong Kiel (November 29, 1961 – April 8, 2012) was an American professional football player who was a quarterback in the National Football League (NFL), Canadian Football League (CFL), and Arena Football League (AFL). He was a four-year starting quarterback and punter in college football for the Notre Dame Fighting Irish from 1980 to 1983. He was inducted into the Indiana Football Hall of Fame in 1998.

== College career ==
Kiel attended Columbus East High School in Indiana, where he was rated the #3 quarterback in the nation by Parade. Coach Dan Devine offered him a scholarship to the University of Notre Dame, where Kiel earned the starting quarterback job during his freshman year, four games into the 1980 season. The team achieved a 9–0–1 record and the #2 ranking before closing the season with losses at USC (3-20) and to Georgia in the Sugar Bowl (10–17).

Kiel went on to become the sixth all-time leading passer for Notre Dame, and holds the record for the team's longest pass play—a 96-yard bomb to Joe Howard against Georgia Tech in 1981. In his final game, he led his unranked team to victory over 13th-ranked Boston College in the Liberty Bowl.

== Professional career ==
Kiel was selected 281st overall in the 11th round by the Tampa Bay Buccaneers in the 1984 NFL draft but only saw playing time in the regular season as a holder on kick attempts. He later played in seven games over two seasons with the Indianapolis Colts as both a quarterback and punter, and then spent three years with the Green Bay Packers. Following stints in the Canadian Football League and the Arena Football League, he retired at the end of 1993.

== Personal life ==
After retirement, Kiel resided in the Fishers area and worked as a private quarterback coach. He died of a heart attack at Columbus Regional Hospital on April 8, 2012, at the age of 50.

Kiel's nephew, Gunner Kiel, played college football for Notre Dame and Cincinnati. His brother, Kip, played for Butler; another nephew, Drew, played at Illinois State; a third nephew, Dusty, played at Indiana.
