= List of Notre Dame Fighting Irish in the NFL draft =

This is a list of Notre Dame Fighting Irish football players in the NFL.

== Key ==
| B | Back | K | Kicker | NT | Nose tackle |
| C | Center | LB | Linebacker | FB | Fullback |
| DB | Defensive back | P | Punter | HB | Halfback |
| DE | Defensive end | QB | Quarterback | WR | Wide receiver |
| DT | Defensive tackle | RB | Running back | G | Guard |
| E | End | T | Offensive tackle | TE | Tight end |

== Selections ==
| Year | Round | Pick | Overall | Player | Team | Position |
|---|---|---|---|---|---|---|
| 1936 | 1 | 3 | 3 | William Shakespeare | Pittsburgh Steelers | B |
| 1936 | 3 | 8 | 26 | Andy Pilney | Detroit Lions | B |
| 1936 | 7 | 3 | 57 | Marty Peters | Pittsburgh Steelers | E |
| 1936 | 7 | 7 | 61 | Wally Fromhart | Green Bay Packers | B |
| 1936 | 8 | 2 | 65 | Wayne Millner | Boston Redskins | E |
| 1938 | 5 | 7 | 37 | Chuck Sweeney | Green Bay Packers | E |
| 1938 | 10 | 4 | 84 | Pat McCarty | Pittsburgh Steelers | C |
| 1938 | 12 | 4 | 104 | Joe Kuharich | Pittsburgh Steelers | G |
| 1939 | 6 | 6 | 46 | Ed Beinor | Brooklyn Dodgers | T |
| 1939 | 8 | 9 | 69 | Paul Kell | Green Bay Packers | T |
| 1939 | 9 | 1 | 71 | Earl Brown | Chicago Cardinals | E |
| 1939 | 17 | 2 | 152 | Ed Longhi | Pittsburgh Steelers | C |
| 1939 | 19 | 6 | 176 | Ed Simonich | Chicago Bears | B |
| 1939 | 21 | 4 | 194 | Willard Hofer | Green Bay Packers | B |
| 1939 | 21 | 5 | 195 | Mario Tonelli | New York Giants | B |
| 1940 | 14 | 9 | 129 | Bill Kerr | Green Bay Packers | E |
| 1940 | 19 | 3 | 173 | Thad Harvey | Pittsburgh Steelers | T |
| 1940 | 22 | 3 | 198 | Steve Sitko | Washington Redskins | B |
| 1941 | 11 | 5 | 95 | Milt Peipul | Detroit Lions | B |
| 1941 | 16 | 8 | 148 | Bob Osterman | Chicago Bears | C |
| 1941 | 17 | 7 | 157 | Bob Saggau | Green Bay Packers | B |
| 1942 | 13 | 6 | 116 | John Kovatch | Washington Redskins | E |
| 1942 | 21 | 1 | 191 | Steve Juzwik | Washington Redskins | B |
| 1943 | 3 | 9 | 24 | Fred Evans | Chicago Bears | B |
| 1943 | 5 | 10 | 40 | Bob Dove | Washington Redskins | E |
| 1943 | 6 | 10 | 50 | Wally Ziemba | Washington Redskins | C |
| 1943 | 7 | 10 | 60 | Lou Rymkus | Washington Redskins | T |
| 1943 | 13 | 8 | 118 | Tom Brock | Green Bay Packers | C |
| 1943 | 13 | 10 | 120 | Harry Wright | Washington Redskins | G |
| 1943 | 26 | 2 | 242 | Bob Neff | Philadelphia Eagles | T |
| 1943 | 30 | 9 | 289 | Dick Creevy | Chicago Bears | B |
| 1944 | 1 | 1 | 1 | Angelo Bertelli | Boston Yanks | QB |
| 1944 | 1 | 3 | 3 | Creighton Miller | Brooklyn Dodgers | B |
| 1944 | 9 | 3 | 79 | Matthew Bolger | Detroit Lions | E |
| 1944 | 12 | 10 | 119 | Pat Filley | Cleveland Rams | G |
| 1944 | 19 | 10 | 196 | Bob McBride | Cleveland Rams | G |
| 1944 | 21 | 10 | 218 | John Creevey | Cleveland Rams | B |
| 1944 | 25 | 1 | 253 | John McGinnis | Chicago Cardinals | E |
| 1944 | 27 | 1 | 275 | Bill Earley | Chicago Cardinals | B |
| 1944 | 27 | 9 | 283 | Russ Ashbaugh | Pittsburgh Steelers | B |
| 1944 | 32 | 5 | 329 | Stan Kudlacz | Cleveland Rams | C |
| 1945 | 1 | 6 | 6 | Frank Szymanski | Detroit Lions | C |
| 1945 | 1 | 9 | 9 | John Yonaker | Philadelphia Eagles | E |
| 1945 | 3 | 7 | 23 | John Adams | Washington Redskins | T |
| 1945 | 4 | 5 | 32 | Jack Zilly | Cleveland Rams | E |
| 1945 | 6 | 2 | 45 | Corwin Clatt | Chicago Cardinals | B |
| 1945 | 6 | 4 | 47 | Jim Mello | Boston Yanks | B |
| 1945 | 6 | 5 | 48 | Gerard Cowhig | Cleveland Rams | B |
| 1945 | 7 | 1 | 55 | Zygmont Czarobski | Chicago Cardinals | T |
| 1945 | 10 | 1 | 88 | Bill Huber | Chicago Cardinals | E |
| 1945 | 12 | 4 | 113 | Herb Coleman | Boston Yanks | C |
| 1945 | 15 | 3 | 145 | George Connor | Pittsburgh Steelers | T |
| 1945 | 16 | 6 | 159 | John Creevey | Chicago Bears | B |
| 1945 | 22 | 6 | 225 | Bob Livingston | Chicago Bears | B |
| 1945 | 23 | 5 | 235 | Luke Higgins | Cleveland Rams | T |
| 1945 | 30 | 6 | 313 | Paul Limont | Detroit Lions | E |
| 1946 | 1 | 1 | 1 | Frank Dancewicz | Boston Yanks | QB |
| 1946 | 1 | 4 | 4 | Johnny Lujack | Chicago Bears | QB |
| 1946 | 1 | 5 | 5 | George Connor | New York Giants | LB |
| 1946 | 1 | 10 | 10 | Emil Sitko | Los Angeles Rams | B |
| 1946 | 3 | 1 | 16 | Elmer Angsman | Chicago Cardinals | B |
| 1946 | 7 | 2 | 52 | Ed Mieszkowski | Boston Yanks | T |
| 1946 | 7 | 8 | 58 | Pete Berezney | Detroit Lions | T |
| 1946 | 9 | 9 | 79 | Bob Skoglund | Washington Redskins | E |
| 1946 | 10 | 10 | 90 | Joe Signaigo | Los Angeles Rams | G |
| 1946 | 13 | 10 | 120 | George Strohmeyer | Los Angeles Rams | C |
| 1946 | 14 | 10 | 130 | Bob Palladino | Los Angeles Rams | B |
| 1946 | 15 | 1 | 131 | Fred Rovai | Chicago Cardinals | G |
| 1946 | 17 | 10 | 160 | Gasper Urban | Los Angeles Rams | G |
| 1946 | 19 | 10 | 180 | Jerry Ford | Los Angeles Rams | E |
| 1946 | 20 | 1 | 181 | Bill Heywood | Chicago Cardinals | B |
| 1946 | 20 | 2 | 182 | Frank Ruggerio | Boston Yanks | B |
| 1947 | 3 | 3 | 16 | John Mastrangelo | Pittsburgh Steelers | G |
| 1947 | 6 | 2 | 37 | George Sullivan | Boston Yanks | T |
| 1947 | 10 | 6 | 81 | Bob Kelly | Green Bay Packers | B |
| 1947 | 13 | 6 | 111 | Bob Skoglund | Green Bay Packers | E |
| 1947 | 15 | 9 | 134 | John Fallon | New York Giants | T |
| 1947 | 26 | 9 | 244 | Ralph Stewart | New York Giants | C |
| 1947 | 27 | 5 | 250 | Bob Palladino | Green Bay Packers | B |
| 1948 | 6 | 8 | 43 | Joe Gasparella | Pittsburgh Steelers | B |
| 1948 | 8 | 8 | 63 | Marty Wendell | Philadelphia Eagles | G |
| 1948 | 16 | 4 | 139 | George Ratterman | Boston Yanks | QB |
| 1948 | 17 | 7 | 152 | John Fallon | Chicago Bears | G |
| 1948 | 18 | 5 | 160 | Bill O'Connor | Los Angeles Rams | G |
| 1948 | 24 | 8 | 223 | Floyd Simmons | Pittsburgh Steelers | B |
| 1948 | 25 | 2 | 227 | Coy McGee | Detroit Lions | B |
| 1948 | 29 | 6 | 271 | John Panelli | Green Bay Packers | B |
| 1948 | 31 | 7 | 292 | Art Statuto | Philadelphia Eagles | C |
| 1948 | 32 | 7 | 300 | Bill Fischer | Chicago Cardinals | G |
| 1949 | 1 | 9 | 9 | Frank Tripucka | Philadelphia Eagles | QB |
| 1949 | 1 | 10 | 10 | Bill Fischer | Chicago Cardinals | G |
| 1949 | 2 | 1 | 12 | John Panelli | Detroit Lions | B |
| 1949 | 3 | 5 | 26 | Bill Walsh | Pittsburgh Steelers | C |
| 1949 | 5 | 10 | 51 | Terry Brennan | Philadelphia Eagles | B |
| 1949 | 8 | 8 | 79 | Bill Wightkin | Chicago Bears | E |
| 1949 | 20 | 2 | 193 | Frank Gaul | Boston Yanks | T |
| 1949 | 24 | 4 | 235 | Don McAuliffe | New York Giants | B |
| 1950 | 1 | 1 | 1 | Leon Hart | Detroit Lions | E |
| 1950 | 2 | 12 | 26 | Jim Martin | Cleveland Browns | E |
| 1950 | 4 | 3 | 43 | Larry Coutre | Green Bay Packers | B |
| 1950 | 5 | 2 | 55 | Mike Swistowicz | New York Bulldogs | B |
| 1950 | 5 | 5 | 58 | Frank Spaniel | Washington Redskins | B |
| 1950 | 5 | 9 | 62 | Ernie Zalejski | Chicago Bears | B |
| 1950 | 7 | 6 | 85 | Billy Gay | Chicago Cardinals | B |
| 1950 | 10 | 7 | 125 | Walt Grothaus | Chicago Cardinals | C |
| 1950 | 11 | 9 | 140 | John Helwig | Chicago Bears | G |
| 1950 | 18 | 7 | 229 | Ray Espenan | Chicago Cardinals | E |
| 1950 | 19 | 4 | 239 | Gus Cifelli | Detroit Lions | T |
| 1950 | 19 | 7 | 242 | Frank Gaul | Pittsburgh Steelers | T |
| 1950 | 30 | 8 | 386 | Ed Hudak | Pittsburgh Steelers | T |
| 1951 | 1 | 2 | 2 | Bob Williams | Chicago Bears | QB |
| 1951 | 1 | 6 | 6 | Jerry Groom | Chicago Cardinals | C |
| 1951 | 12 | 4 | 139 | Jack Landry | Chicago Cardinals | B |
| 1951 | 20 | 4 | 235 | Fred Wallner | Chicago Cardinals | G |
| 1951 | 29 | 4 | 343 | Bob Livingstone | Chicago Cardinals | B |
| 1952 | 2 | 9 | 22 | Bob Toneff | San Francisco 49ers | T |
| 1952 | 7 | 1 | 74 | John Petitbon | New York Yanks | B |
| 1952 | 10 | 6 | 115 | Chet Ostrowski | Washington Redskins | E |
| 1952 | 12 | 1 | 134 | Jim Mutscheller | New York Yanks | E |
| 1952 | 13 | 5 | 150 | Dave Flood | Pittsburgh Steelers | B |
| 1952 | 16 | 10 | 191 | Paul Burns | New York Giants | G |
| 1952 | 28 | 2 | 327 | Billy Barrett | Green Bay Packers | B |
| 1953 | 15 | 4 | 173 | Bob O'Neil | Pittsburgh Steelers | E |
| 1953 | 29 | 1 | 338 | Jack Alessandrini | Baltimore Colts | G |
| 1953 | 30 | 2 | 351 | Bill Gaudreau | Chicago Cardinals | B |
| 1954 | 1 | 3 | 3 | Art Hunter | Green Bay Packers | T |
| 1954 | 1 | 7 | 7 | Johnny Lattner | Pittsburgh Steelers | RB |
| 1954 | 1 | 9 | 9 | Neil Worden | Philadelphia Eagles | B |
| 1954 | 2 | 7 | 20 | Jim Schrader | Washington Redskins | C |
| 1954 | 4 | 5 | 42 | Fran Paterra | Chicago Bears | B |
| 1954 | 4 | 8 | 45 | Menil Mavraides | Philadelphia Eagles | G |
| 1954 | 6 | 1 | 62 | Tom McHugh | Chicago Cardinals | B |
| 1954 | 10 | 9 | 118 | Joe Katchik | Los Angeles Rams | E |
| 1954 | 15 | 10 | 179 | Sam Palumbo | San Francisco 49ers | G |
| 1954 | 18 | 6 | 211 | Don Penza | Pittsburgh Steelers | E |
| 1954 | 27 | 9 | 322 | Entee Shine | Los Angeles Rams | E |
| 1954 | 28 | 6 | 331 | Joe Bush | Pittsburgh Steelers | G |
| 1955 | 1 | 4 | 4 | Ralph Guglielmi | Washington Redskins | QB |
| 1955 | 1 | 6 | 6 | Frank Varrichione | Pittsburgh Steelers | T |
| 1955 | 1 | 8 | 8 | Joe Heap | New York Giants | B |
| 1955 | 2 | 3 | 16 | Dick Szymanski | Baltimore Colts | C |
| 1955 | 3 | 7 | 32 | Tony Pasquesi | Chicago Cardinals | T |
| 1955 | 4 | 4 | 41 | Paul Reynolds | Cleveland Browns | B |
| 1955 | 4 | 12 | 49 | Sam Palumbo | Cleveland Browns | C |
| 1955 | 6 | 2 | 63 | Dan Shannon | Chicago Bears | E |
| 1955 | 24 | 2 | 279 | Bob Ready | Washington Redskins | T |
| 1956 | 3 | 3 | 28 | Don Schaffer | Philadelphia Eagles | B |
| 1956 | 9 | 3 | 100 | Wayne Edmonds | Pittsburgh Steelers | G |
| 1956 | 13 | 7 | 152 | Jim Mense | Green Bay Packers | C |
| 1956 | 14 | 8 | 165 | John McCullen | New York Giants | G |
| 1956 | 15 | 9 | 178 | Dick Fitzgerald | Chicago Bears | B |
| 1956 | 19 | 10 | 227 | Ray Lemek | Washington Redskins | G |
| 1956 | 21 | 3 | 244 | Gene Martell | Pittsburgh Steelers | T |
| 1956 | 21 | 12 | 253 | Gene Kapish | Cleveland Browns | E |
| 1956 | 22 | 9 | 262 | George Nicula | Washington Redskins | T |
| 1956 | 29 | 10 | 347 | Pat Bisceglia | Washington Redskins | G |
| 1957 | 1 | 1 | 1 | Paul Hornung | Green Bay Packers | RB |
| 1957 | 12 | 2 | 135 | Ed Sullivan | Green Bay Packers | C |
| 1957 | 13 | 3 | 148 | Jim Morse | Green Bay Packers | B |
| 1957 | 20 | 3 | 232 | Byron Beams | Los Angeles Rams | T |
| 1958 | 6 | 5 | 66 | Dick Lynch | Washington Redskins | B |
| 1958 | 9 | 5 | 102 | Frank Kuchta | Washington Redskins | C |
| 1958 | 10 | 4 | 113 | Aubrey Lewis | Chicago Bears | B |
| 1959 | 1 | 6 | 6 | Nick Pietrosante | Detroit Lions | B |
| 1959 | 5 | 1 | 49 | Bob Wetoska | Washington Redskins | T |
| 1959 | 5 | 6 | 54 | Frank Geremia | San Francisco 49ers | T |
| 1959 | 7 | 4 | 76 | Don Lawrence | Washington Redskins | T |
| 1959 | 10 | 5 | 113 | Ron Toth | Washington Redskins | B |
| 1959 | 10 | 6 | 114 | Bronko Nagurski Jr. | San Francisco 49ers | T |
| 1959 | 18 | 10 | 214 | Al Ecuyer | New York Giants | G |
| 1959 | 27 | 4 | 316 | Norm Odyniec | Washington Redskins | B |
| 1959 | 28 | 8 | 332 | Robert Williams | Chicago Bears | B |
| 1959 | 29 | 7 | 343 | Dick Loncar | Pittsburgh Steelers | T |
| 1959 | 30 | 2 | 350 | Angelo Mosca | Philadelphia Eagles | T |
| 1960 | 1 | 2 | 2 | George Izo | St. Louis Cardinals | QB |
| 1960 | 1 | 11 | 11 | Monty Stickles | San Francisco 49ers | WR |
| 1960 | 3 | 3 | 27 | Bob Scholtz | Detroit Lions | C |
| 1960 | 12 | 4 | 136 | Jim Crotty | Washington Redskins | HB |
| 1960 | 17 | 8 | 200 | Mike Graney | Philadelphia Eagles | E |
| 1961 | 2 | 5 | 19 | Myron Pottios | Pittsburgh Steelers | LB |
| 1961 | 10 | 4 | 130 | Joe Scibelli | Los Angeles Rams | T |
| 1961 | 10 | 5 | 131 | Red Mack | Pittsburgh Steelers | B |
| 1961 | 20 | 12 | 278 | Ray Ratkowski | Green Bay Packers | B |
| 1962 | 2 | 2 | 16 | Joe Carollo | Los Angeles Rams | T |
| 1962 | 2 | 12 | 26 | Bob Bill | New York Giants | T |
| 1962 | 5 | 8 | 64 | Mike Lind | San Francisco 49ers | RB |
| 1962 | 9 | 5 | 117 | John Powers | Pittsburgh Steelers | E |
| 1962 | 13 | 7 | 175 | Joe Perkowski | Chicago Bears | B |
| 1963 | 10 | 11 | 137 | Ed Hoerster | Chicago Bears | LB |
| 1963 | 12 | 14 | 168 | Daryle Lamonica | Green Bay Packers | QB |
| 1963 | 13 | 0 | 102 | Nick Buoniconti | New England Patriots | LB |
| 1963 | 16 | 3 | 213 | John Slafkosky | St. Louis Cardinals | T |
| 1964 | 2 | 14 | 28 | Jim Kelly | Pittsburgh Steelers | WR |
| 1964 | 4 | 13 | 55 | Paul Costa | Green Bay Packers | T |
| 1964 | 4 | 14 | 56 | Frank Budka | Chicago Bears | RB |
| 1964 | 5 | 3 | 59 | Jim Snowden | Washington Redskins | RB |
| 1964 | 8 | 6 | 104 | George Bedar | St. Louis Cardinals | G |
| 1964 | 13 | 3 | 171 | Tommy MacDonald | Washington Redskins | B |
| 1964 | 17 | 12 | 236 | Dave Humenik | New York Giants | T |
| 1965 | 1 | 8 | 8 | Jack Snow | Minnesota Vikings | WR |
| 1965 | 2 | 0 | 0 | John Huarte | New York Jets | QB |
| 1965 | 6 | 3 | 73 | Tony Carey | Chicago Bears | RB |
| 1965 | 6 | 6 | 76 | John Huarte | Philadelphia Eagles | QB |
| 1965 | 8 | 12 | 110 | John Meyer | St. Louis Cardinals | LB |
| 1965 | 12 | 1 | 155 | Jim Carroll | New York Giants | LB |
| 1965 | 14 | 3 | 185 | Dave Pivec | Chicago Bears | WR |
| 1965 | 14 | 6 | 188 | Tom Longo | Philadelphia Eagles | B |
| 1965 | 18 | 13 | 251 | Dick Arrington | Cleveland Browns | G |
| 1966 | 2 | 1 | 17 | Nick Rassas | Atlanta Falcons | DB |
| 1966 | 2 | 8 | 24 | Nick Eddy | Detroit Lions | RB |
| 1966 | 3 | 16 | 48 | Phil Sheridan | Atlanta Falcons | WR |
| 1966 | 4 | 13 | 61 | Pete Duranko | Cleveland Browns | DE |
| 1966 | 5 | 1 | 65 | Bill Wolski | Atlanta Falcons | RB |
| 1966 | 8 | 13 | 123 | Tom Talaga | Cleveland Browns | WR |
| 1966 | 16 | 4 | 234 | Arunas Vasys | Philadelphia Eagles | LB |
| 1967 | 1 | 12 | 12 | Paul Seiler | New York Jets | G |
| 1967 | 1 | 15 | 15 | Alan Page | Minnesota Vikings | DE |
| 1967 | 1 | 23 | 23 | Tom Regner | Houston Oilers | G |
| 1967 | 2 | 20 | 46 | Larry Conjar | Cleveland Browns | RB |
| 1967 | 2 | 21 | 47 | Jim Lynch | Kansas City Chiefs | LB |
| 1967 | 3 | 6 | 59 | George Goeddeke | Denver Broncos | C |
| 1967 | 3 | 17 | 70 | Tom Rhoads | Buffalo Bills | DE |
| 1967 | 16 | 15 | 408 | Allen Sack | Los Angeles Rams | LB |
| 1968 | 1 | 7 | 7 | Kevin Hardy | New Orleans Saints | DE |
| 1968 | 3 | 21 | 76 | Mike McGill | Minnesota Vikings | LB |
| 1968 | 5 | 5 | 116 | Jim Smithberger | New England Patriots | DB |
| 1968 | 6 | 19 | 157 | David Martin | Philadelphia Eagles | DB |
| 1968 | 8 | 3 | 195 | Dick Swatland | New Orleans Saints | G |
| 1968 | 8 | 20 | 212 | Tom Schoen | Cleveland Browns | DB |
| 1968 | 11 | 24 | 297 | John Pergine | Los Angeles Rams | LB |
| 1968 | 16 | 9 | 417 | Rocky Bleier | Pittsburgh Steelers | RB |
| 1969 | 1 | 2 | 2 | George Kunz | Atlanta Falcons | T |
| 1969 | 1 | 10 | 10 | Jim Seymour | Los Angeles Rams | WR |
| 1969 | 2 | 4 | 30 | Terry Hanratty | Pittsburgh Steelers | QB |
| 1969 | 4 | 2 | 80 | Bob Kuechenberg | Philadelphia Eagles | G |
| 1969 | 5 | 15 | 119 | Jim Winegardner | Chicago Bears | TE |
| 1969 | 6 | 11 | 141 | Ed Tuck | Miami Dolphins | G |
| 1969 | 8 | 6 | 188 | Bob Gladieux | New England Patriots | RB |
| 1969 | 11 | 9 | 269 | Eric Norri | Washington Redskins | DT |
| 1969 | 12 | 22 | 308 | Bob Belden | Dallas Cowboys | QB |
| 1969 | 12 | 23 | 309 | John Lavin | Kansas City Chiefs | LB |
| 1969 | 13 | 8 | 325 | Tom Quinn | Chicago Bears | DB |
| 1970 | 1 | 2 | 2 | Mike McCoy | Green Bay Packers | DT |
| 1970 | 3 | 5 | 57 | Jim Reilly | Buffalo Bills | G |
| 1970 | 5 | 3 | 107 | Bob Olson | New England Patriots | LB |
| 1970 | 5 | 26 | 130 | Mike Oriard | Kansas City Chiefs | C |
| 1970 | 7 | 2 | 158 | Terry Brennan | Philadelphia Eagles | T |
| 1971 | 4 | 21 | 99 | Joe Theismann | Miami Dolphins | QB |
| 1971 | 5 | 1 | 105 | Tim Kelly | New England Patriots | LB |
| 1971 | 7 | 2 | 158 | Larry DiNardo | New Orleans Saints | G |
| 1971 | 15 | 18 | 382 | Jim Wright | New York Giants | LB |
| 1971 | 15 | 20 | 384 | Gary Kos | Los Angeles Rams | G |
| 1972 | 1 | 1 | 1 | Walt Patulski | Buffalo Bills | DE |
| 1972 | 1 | 15 | 15 | Clarence Ellis | Atlanta Falcons | DB |
| 1972 | 1 | 25 | 25 | Mike Kadish | Miami Dolphins | DT |
| 1972 | 3 | 1 | 53 | Fred Swendson | Buffalo Bills | DE |
| 1972 | 4 | 8 | 86 | Eric Patton | Green Bay Packers | LB |
| 1972 | 5 | 3 | 107 | Tom Gatewood | New York Giants | WR |
| 1972 | 7 | 1 | 157 | Ralph Stepaniak | Buffalo Bills | DB |
| 1972 | 7 | 21 | 177 | Mike Zikas | New York Giants | DT |
| 1973 | 2 | 13 | 39 | Greg Marx | Atlanta Falcons | DT |
| 1973 | 6 | 8 | 138 | Mike Creaney | Chicago Bears | C |
| 1973 | 9 | 16 | 224 | John Dampeer | Cincinnati Bengals | G |
| 1973 | 12 | 10 | 296 | Jim O'Malley | Denver Broncos | LB |
| 1973 | 13 | 8 | 320 | John Cieszkowski | Chicago Bears | RB |
| 1973 | 15 | 3 | 367 | Ken Schlezes | Philadelphia Eagles | DB |
| 1974 | 2 | 19 | 45 | Dave Casper | Oakland Raiders | TE |
| 1974 | 4 | 8 | 86 | Mike Townsend | Minnesota Vikings | DB |
| 1974 | 9 | 18 | 226 | Brian Doherty | Buffalo Bills | P |
| 1974 | 11 | 5 | 265 | Tim Rudnick | Baltimore Colts | DB |
| 1974 | 14 | 15 | 353 | Frank Pomarico | Kansas City Chiefs | G |
| 1974 | 15 | 24 | 388 | Robert R. Thomas | Los Angeles Rams | K |
| 1974 | 17 | 11 | 427 | Cliff Brown | Philadelphia Eagles | RB |
| 1974 | 17 | 24 | 440 | Willie Townsend | Los Angeles Rams | WR |
| 1975 | 1 | 9 | 9 | Mike Fanning | Los Angeles Rams | DT |
| 1975 | 2 | 9 | 35 | Greg Collins | San Francisco 49ers | LB |
| 1975 | 3 | 17 | 69 | Drew Mahalic | Denver Broncos | LB |
| 1975 | 5 | 7 | 111 | Kevin Nosbusch | San Diego Chargers | DT |
| 1975 | 5 | 10 | 114 | Wayne Bullock | San Francisco 49ers | RB |
| 1975 | 10 | 25 | 259 | Steve Sylvester | Oakland Raiders | T |
| 1975 | 13 | 8 | 320 | Peter Demmerle | San Diego Chargers | WR |
| 1975 | 13 | 17 | 329 | Erik Penick | Denver Broncos | RB |
| 1975 | 14 | 7 | 345 | Reggie Barnett | San Diego Chargers | DB |
| 1975 | 16 | 18 | 408 | Tom Fine | Buffalo Bills | TE |
| 1976 | 1 | 2 | 2 | Steve Niehaus | Seattle Seahawks | DT |
| 1976 | 7 | 19 | 201 | Ed Bauer | New Orleans Saints | G |
| 1978 | 1 | 7 | 7 | Ken MacAfee | San Francisco 49ers | TE |
| 1978 | 1 | 8 | 8 | Ross Browner | Cincinnati Bengals | DE |
| 1978 | 1 | 11 | 11 | Luther Bradley | Detroit Lions | DB |
| 1978 | 2 | 21 | 49 | Willie Fry | Pittsburgh Steelers | DE |
| 1978 | 3 | 23 | 79 | Ernie Hughes | San Francisco 49ers | G |
| 1978 | 5 | 1 | 111 | Ted Burgmeier | Miami Dolphins | DB |
| 1978 | 9 | 27 | 249 | Steve McDaniels | San Francisco 49ers | T |
| 1978 | 10 | 18 | 268 | Doug Becker | Pittsburgh Steelers | LB |
| 1979 | 2 | 15 | 43 | Dave Huffman | Minnesota Vikings | C |
| 1979 | 2 | 24 | 52 | Bob Golic | New England Patriots | DT |
| 1979 | 3 | 26 | 82 | Joe Montana | San Francisco 49ers | QB |
| 1979 | 8 | 5 | 197 | Steve Heimkreiter | Baltimore Colts | LB |
| 1979 | 9 | 10 | 230 | Jerome Heavens | Chicago Bears | RB |
| 1979 | 9 | 13 | 233 | Kris Haines | Washington Redskins | WR |
| 1979 | 9 | 24 | 244 | Jeff Weston | Miami Dolphins | DT |
| 1979 | 10 | 9 | 257 | Joe Restic | Chicago Bears | DB |
| 1979 | 10 | 26 | 274 | Mike Calhoun | Dallas Cowboys | DT |
| 1979 | 12 | 1 | 304 | Jim Browner | Cincinnati Bengals | DB |
| 1980 | 1 | 25 | 25 | Vagas Ferguson | New England Patriots | RB |
| 1980 | 2 | 13 | 41 | Dave Waymer | New Orleans Saints | DB |
| 1980 | 2 | 23 | 51 | Tim Foley | Baltimore Colts | T |
| 1980 | 4 | 6 | 89 | Rusty Lisch | St. Louis Cardinals | QB |
| 1980 | 8 | 17 | 210 | Bobby Leopold | San Francisco 49ers | LB |
| 1980 | 10 | 12 | 261 | Rob Martinovich | Kansas City Chiefs | T |
| 1981 | 4 | 26 | 109 | John Scully | Atlanta Falcons | C |
| 1981 | 7 | 23 | 189 | Pete Holohan | San Diego Chargers | TE |
| 1981 | 8 | 12 | 205 | Scott Zettek | Chicago Bears | DT |
| 1981 | 9 | 2 | 223 | Jim Stone | Seattle Seahawks | RB |
| 1981 | 9 | 6 | 227 | Tim Huffman | Green Bay Packers | T |
| 1981 | 12 | 13 | 317 | John Hankerd | Denver Broncos | LB |
| 1982 | 1 | 23 | 23 | Bob Crable | New York Jets | LB |
| 1982 | 3 | 21 | 76 | John Krimm | New Orleans Saints | DB |
| 1982 | 5 | 26 | 137 | Phil Pozderac | Dallas Cowboys | T |
| 1983 | 1 | 12 | 12 | Tony Hunter | Buffalo Bills | TE |
| 1983 | 3 | 8 | 64 | Dave Duerson | Chicago Bears | DB |
| 1983 | 4 | 7 | 91 | Tom Thayer | Chicago Bears | C |
| 1983 | 5 | 2 | 114 | Larry Moriarty | Houston Oilers | RB |
| 1983 | 9 | 11 | 235 | Mark Zavagnin | Chicago Bears | LB |
| 1983 | 9 | 12 | 236 | Bob Clasby | Seattle Seahawks | DT |
| 1984 | 1 | 26 | 26 | Greg Bell | Buffalo Bills | RB |
| 1984 | 6 | 24 | 164 | Chris Brown | Pittsburgh Steelers | DB |
| 1984 | 6 | 28 | 168 | Stacey Toran | Los Angeles Raiders | DB |
| 1984 | 9 | 25 | 249 | Neil Maune | Dallas Cowboys | G |
| 1984 | 11 | 1 | 281 | Blair Kiel | Tampa Bay Buccaneers | QB |
| 1985 | 2 | 17 | 45 | Mike Gann | Atlanta Falcons | DE |
| 1985 | 3 | 26 | 82 | Mike Kelley | Houston Oilers | C |
| 1985 | 4 | 16 | 100 | Mark Bavaro | New York Giants | TE |
| 1985 | 10 | 3 | 255 | Mike Golic | Houston Oilers | DE |
| 1985 | 10 | 7 | 259 | Larry Williams | Cleveland Browns | G |
| 1986 | 1 | 19 | 19 | Eric Dorsey | New York Giants | DE |
| 1986 | 3 | 6 | 61 | Allen Pinkett | Houston Oilers | RB |
| 1986 | 8 | 8 | 202 | Tony Furjanic | Buffalo Bills | LB |
| 1986 | 8 | 15 | 209 | Mike Perrino | San Diego Chargers | T |
| 1987 | 2 | 20 | 48 | Wally Kleine | Washington Redskins | T |
| 1987 | 4 | 26 | 110 | Steve Beuerlein | Los Angeles Raiders | QB |
| 1987 | 7 | 8 | 176 | Robert Banks | Houston Oilers | DT |
| 1987 | 8 | 15 | 210 | Joel Williams | Miami Dolphins | TE |
| 1988 | 1 | 6 | 6 | Tim Brown | Los Angeles Raiders | WR |
| 1988 | 3 | 14 | 69 | Tom Rehder | New England Patriots | T |
| 1988 | 3 | 15 | 70 | Chuck Lanza | Pittsburgh Steelers | C |
| 1988 | 6 | 15 | 152 | Cedric Figaro | San Diego Chargers | LB |
| 1988 | 9 | 5 | 226 | Brandy Wells | Cincinnati Bengals | DB |
| 1989 | 1 | 15 | 15 | Andy Heck | Seattle Seahawks | T |
| 1989 | 2 | 17 | 45 | Frank Stams | Los Angeles Rams | LB |
| 1989 | 5 | 18 | 130 | Mark Green | Chicago Bears | RB |
| 1989 | 6 | 8 | 147 | Wes Pritchett | Miami Dolphins | LB |
| 1989 | 11 | 25 | 304 | George Streeter | Chicago Bears | DB |
| 1990 | 2 | 11 | 36 | Anthony Johnson | Indianapolis Colts | RB |
| 1990 | 2 | 15 | 40 | Tim Grunhard | Kansas City Chiefs | C |
| 1990 | 2 | 16 | 41 | Jeff Alm | Houston Oilers | DT |
| 1990 | 2 | 24 | 49 | Pat Terrell | Los Angeles Rams | DB |
| 1990 | 4 | 10 | 91 | Mike Brennan | Cincinnati Bengals | T |
| 1990 | 5 | 14 | 123 | Stan Smagala | Los Angeles Raiders | DB |
| 1990 | 6 | 9 | 146 | Ned Bolcar | Seattle Seahawks | LB |
| 1990 | 10 | 14 | 262 | D'Juan Francisco | Washington Redskins | DB |
| 1990 | 12 | 12 | 316 | Dean Brown | Indianapolis Colts | G |
| 1991 | 1 | 5 | 5 | Todd Lyght | Los Angeles Rams | DB |
| 1991 | 2 | 18 | 45 | Ricky Watters | San Francisco 49ers | RB |
| 1991 | 2 | 22 | 49 | Chris Zorich | Chicago Bears | DT |
| 1991 | 3 | 17 | 72 | Bob Dahl | Cincinnati Bengals | T |
| 1991 | 4 | 17 | 100 | Raghib Ismail | Los Angeles Raiders | WR |
| 1991 | 5 | 25 | 136 | Tim Ryan | Tampa Bay Buccaneers | G |
| 1991 | 7 | 18 | 185 | Andre Jones | Pittsburgh Steelers | LB |
| 1991 | 8 | 21 | 216 | Scott Kowalkowski | Philadelphia Eagles | LB |
| 1991 | 9 | 22 | 245 | Mike Stonebreaker | Chicago Bears | LB |
| 1991 | 10 | 7 | 257 | Mike Heldt | San Diego Chargers | C |
| 1992 | 1 | 14 | 14 | Derek Brown | New York Giants | TE |
| 1992 | 2 | 7 | 35 | Rod Smith | New England Patriots | DB |
| 1992 | 4 | 1 | 85 | Rodney Culver | Indianapolis Colts | RB |
| 1992 | 4 | 8 | 92 | Tony Brooks | Philadelphia Eagles | RB |
| 1992 | 4 | 11 | 95 | Gene McGuire | New Orleans Saints | C |
| 1992 | 6 | 19 | 159 | Tony Smith | Kansas City Chiefs | WR |
| 1992 | 6 | 23 | 163 | George Williams | Cleveland Browns | DT |
| 1992 | 9 | 22 | 246 | Mirko Jurkovic | Chicago Bears | G |
| 1993 | 1 | 2 | 2 | Rick Mirer | Seattle Seahawks | QB |
| 1993 | 1 | 10 | 10 | Jerome Bettis | Los Angeles Rams | RB |
| 1993 | 1 | 17 | 17 | Tom Carter | Washington Redskins | DB |
| 1993 | 1 | 20 | 20 | Irv Smith | New Orleans Saints | TE |
| 1993 | 2 | 5 | 34 | Demetrius DuBose | Tampa Bay Buccaneers | LB |
| 1993 | 2 | 16 | 45 | Reggie Brooks | Washington Redskins | RB |
| 1993 | 4 | 23 | 107 | Devon McDonald | Indianapolis Colts | LB |
| 1993 | 5 | 18 | 130 | Lindsay Knapp | Kansas City Chiefs | G |
| 1993 | 8 | 4 | 200 | Craig Hentrich | New York Jets | K |
| 1994 | 1 | 7 | 7 | Bryant Young | San Francisco 49ers | DT |
| 1994 | 1 | 16 | 16 | Aaron Taylor | Green Bay Packers | T |
| 1994 | 1 | 27 | 27 | Jeff Burris | Buffalo Bills | DB |
| 1994 | 2 | 36 | 65 | Tim Ruddy | Miami Dolphins | C |
| 1994 | 3 | 9 | 74 | Jim Flanigan | Chicago Bears | DT |
| 1994 | 3 | 17 | 82 | Willie Clark | San Diego Chargers | DB |
| 1994 | 3 | 27 | 92 | Lake Dawson | Kansas City Chiefs | WR |
| 1994 | 5 | 2 | 133 | John Covington | Indianapolis Colts | DB |
| 1994 | 5 | 22 | 153 | Tony Peterson | San Francisco 49ers | LB |
| 1994 | 7 | 17 | 211 | Pete Bercich | Minnesota Vikings | LB |
| 1995 | 2 | 12 | 44 | Ray Zellars | New Orleans Saints | RB |
| 1995 | 2 | 18 | 50 | Bobby Taylor | Philadelphia Eagles | DB |
| 1995 | 4 | 22 | 120 | Oliver Gibson | Pittsburgh Steelers | DE |
| 1995 | 5 | 13 | 147 | Mike Miller | Cleveland Browns | WR |
| 1995 | 7 | 34 | 242 | Travis Davis | New Orleans Saints | DB |
| 1996 | 2 | 26 | 56 | Derrick Mayes | Green Bay Packers | WR |
| 1996 | 4 | 21 | 116 | Paul Grasmanis | Chicago Bears | DT |
| 1996 | 6 | 22 | 189 | Shawn Wooden | Miami Dolphins | DB |
| 1996 | 6 | 35 | 202 | Dusty Zeigler | Buffalo Bills | C |
| 1997 | 1 | 21 | 21 | Renaldo Wynn | Jacksonville Jaguars | DE |
| 1997 | 2 | 25 | 55 | Marc Edwards | San Francisco 49ers | RB |
| 1997 | 3 | 26 | 86 | Bertrand Berry | Indianapolis Colts | LB |
| 1997 | 3 | 27 | 87 | Kinnon Tatum | Carolina Panthers | LB |
| 1997 | 5 | 5 | 135 | Pete Chryplewicz | Detroit Lions | TE |
| 1998 | 3 | 24 | 85 | Allen Rossum | Philadelphia Eagles | DB |
| 1999 | 1 | 19 | 19 | Luke Petitgout | New York Giants | T |
| 1999 | 5 | 10 | 143 | Jerry Wisne | Chicago Bears | G |
| 1999 | 5 | 17 | 149 | Mike Rosenthal | New York Giants | T |
| 1999 | 5 | 33 | 166 | Malcolm Johnson | Pittsburgh Steelers | WR |
| 1999 | 7 | 4 | 210 | Hunter Smith | Indianapolis Colts | P |
| 1999 | 7 | 27 | 233 | Autry Denson | Tampa Bay Buccaneers | RB |
| 1999 | 7 | 28 | 234 | Kory Minor | San Francisco 49ers | LB |
| 2000 | 7 | 8 | 214 | Jarious Jackson | Denver Broncos | QB |
| 2001 | 3 | 6 | 68 | Mike Gandy | Chicago Bears | G |
| 2001 | 3 | 24 | 86 | Brock Williams | New England Patriots | DB |
| 2001 | 4 | 24 | 119 | Jabari Holloway | New England Patriots | TE |
| 2001 | 6 | 15 | 178 | Tony Driver | Buffalo Bills | DB |
| 2001 | 6 | 32 | 195 | Dan O'Leary | Buffalo Bills | TE |
| 2001 | 7 | 13 | 213 | Anthony Denman | Jacksonville Jaguars | LB |
| 2002 | 2 | 20 | 52 | Anthony Weaver | Baltimore Ravens | DE |
| 2002 | 4 | 35 | 133 | Rocky Boiman | Tennessee Titans | LB |
| 2002 | 5 | 3 | 138 | John Owens | Detroit Lions | TE |
| 2002 | 6 | 26 | 198 | Tyreo Harrison | Philadelphia Eagles | LB |
| 2002 | 6 | 34 | 206 | Javin Hunter | Baltimore Ravens | WR |
| 2002 | 7 | 33 | 244 | David Givens | New England Patriots | WR |
| 2003 | 1 | 21 | 21 | Jeff Faine | Cleveland Browns | C |
| 2003 | 5 | 18 | 153 | Jordan Black | Kansas City Chiefs | T |
| 2003 | 5 | 33 | 168 | Sean Mahan | Tampa Bay Buccaneers | G |
| 2003 | 5 | 35 | 170 | Shane Walton | St. Louis Rams | DB |
| 2003 | 6 | 9 | 182 | Gerome Sapp | Baltimore Ravens | DB |
| 2003 | 6 | 24 | 197 | Arnaz Battle | San Francisco 49ers | WR |
| 2003 | 6 | 39 | 212 | Brennan Curtin | Green Bay Packers | T |
| 2004 | 2 | 11 | 43 | Julius Jones | Dallas Cowboys | RB |
| 2004 | 2 | 28 | 60 | Courtney Watson | New Orleans Saints | LB |
| 2004 | 4 | 26 | 122 | Glenn Earl | Houston Texans | DB |
| 2004 | 6 | 5 | 170 | Vontez Duff | Houston Texans | DB |
| 2004 | 6 | 15 | 180 | Jim Molinaro | Washington Redskins | T |
| 2005 | 3 | 10 | 74 | Justin Tuck | New York Giants | DE |
| 2005 | 5 | 8 | 144 | Jerome Collins | St. Louis Rams | TE |
| 2006 | 2 | 21 | 53 | Anthony Fasano | Dallas Cowboys | TE |
| 2006 | 3 | 26 | 90 | Maurice Stovall | Tampa Bay Buccaneers | WR |
| 2006 | 6 | 36 | 205 | Dan Stevenson | New England Patriots | G |
| 2007 | 1 | 22 | 22 | Brady Quinn | Cleveland Browns | QB |
| 2007 | 2 | 25 | 57 | Victor Abiamiri | Philadelphia Eagles | DE |
| 2007 | 3 | 6 | 70 | Ryan Harris | Denver Broncos | T |
| 2007 | 5 | 29 | 166 | Derek Landri | Jacksonville Jaguars | DT |
| 2007 | 6 | 28 | 202 | Mike Richardson | New England Patriots | DB |
| 2007 | 7 | 20 | 230 | Dan Santucci | Cincinnati Bengals | G |
| 2007 | 7 | 43 | 253 | Chinedum Ndukwe | Cincinnati Bengals | DB |
| 2008 | 2 | 7 | 38 | John Carlson | Seattle Seahawks | TE |
| 2008 | 2 | 16 | 47 | Trevor Laws | Philadelphia Eagles | DT |
| 2008 | 3 | 23 | 86 | Tom Zbikowski | Baltimore Ravens | DB |
| 2008 | 6 | 21 | 187 | John Sullivan | Minnesota Vikings | C |
| 2009 | 4 | 14 | 114 | David Bruton | Denver Broncos | DB |
| 2010 | 2 | 16 | 48 | Jimmy Clausen | Carolina Panthers | QB |
| 2010 | 2 | 28 | 60 | Golden Tate | Seattle Seahawks | WR |
| 2010 | 6 | 10 | 179 | Sam Young | Dallas Cowboys | T |
| 2010 | 6 | 14 | 183 | Eric Olsen | Denver Broncos | C |
| 2011 | 2 | 11 | 43 | Kyle Rudolph | Minnesota Vikings | TE |
| 2012 | 1 | 13 | 13 | Michael Floyd | Arizona Cardinals | WR |
| 2012 | 1 | 29 | 29 | Harrison Smith | Minnesota Vikings | DB |
| 2012 | 5 | 4 | 139 | Robert Blanton | Minnesota Vikings | DB |
| 2012 | 5 | 30 | 165 | Darius Fleming | San Francisco 49ers | LB |
| 2013 | 1 | 21 | 21 | Tyler Eifert | Cincinnati Bengals | TE |
| 2013 | 2 | 6 | 38 | Manti Te'o | San Diego Chargers | LB |
| 2013 | 6 | 7 | 175 | Jamoris Slaughter | Cleveland Browns | DB |
| 2013 | 6 | 31 | 199 | Theo Riddick | Detroit Lions | RB |
| 2013 | 6 | 32 | 200 | Kapron Lewis-Moore | Baltimore Ravens | DE |
| 2013 | 7 | 38 | 244 | Zeke Motta | Atlanta Falcons | DB |
| 2014 | 1 | 16 | 16 | Zack Martin | Dallas Cowboys | T |
| 2014 | 2 | 14 | 46 | Stephon Tuitt | Pittsburgh Steelers | DE |
| 2014 | 2 | 20 | 52 | Troy Niklas | Arizona Cardinals | TE |
| 2014 | 3 | 19 | 83 | Louis Nix | Houston Texans | DT |
| 2014 | 3 | 25 | 89 | Chris Watt | San Diego Chargers | G |
| 2014 | 4 | 39 | 139 | Prince Shembo | Atlanta Falcons | LB |
| 2014 | 6 | 11 | 187 | Bennett Jackson | New York Giants | DB |
| 2014 | 6 | 13 | 189 | T. J. Jones | Detroit Lions | WR |
| 2015 | 7 | 12 | 229 | Ben Koyack | Jacksonville Jaguars | TE |
| 2016 | 1 | 6 | 6 | Ronnie Stanley | Baltimore Ravens | T |
| 2016 | 1 | 21 | 21 | Will Fuller | Houston Texans | WR |
| 2016 | 2 | 3 | 34 | Jaylon Smith | Dallas Cowboys | LB |
| 2016 | 2 | 19 | 50 | Nick Martin | Houston Texans | C |
| 2016 | 3 | 11 | 74 | KeiVarae Russell | Kansas City Chiefs | DB |
| 2016 | 3 | 27 | 90 | C. J. Prosise | Seattle Seahawks | RB |
| 2016 | 4 | 5 | 103 | Sheldon Day | Jacksonville Jaguars | DT |
| 2017 | 2 | 21 | 52 | DeShone Kizer | Cleveland Browns | QB |
| 2017 | 7 | 8 | 225 | Isaac Rochell | Los Angeles Chargers | DE |
| 2018 | 1 | 6 | 6 | Quenton Nelson | Indianapolis Colts | G |
| 2018 | 1 | 9 | 9 | Mike McGlinchey | San Francisco 49ers | T |
| 2018 | 4 | 23 | 123 | Durham Smythe | Miami Dolphins | TE |
| 2018 | 6 | 33 | 207 | Equanimeous St. Brown | Green Bay Packers | WR |
| 2019 | 1 | 28 | 28 | Jerry Tillery | Los Angeles Chargers | DT |
| 2019 | 3 | 29 | 93 | Miles Boykin | Baltimore Ravens | WR |
| 2019 | 4 | 6 | 108 | Julian Love | New York Giants | DB |
| 2019 | 4 | 28 | 130 | Drue Tranquill | Los Angeles Chargers | LB |
| 2019 | 6 | 21 | 194 | Dexter Williams | Green Bay Packers | RB |
| 2019 | 7 | 17 | 231 | Alizé Mack | New Orleans Saints | TE |
| 2020 | 2 | 11 | 43 | Cole Kmet | Chicago Bears | TE |
| 2020 | 2 | 17 | 49 | Chase Claypool | Pittsburgh Steelers | WR |
| 2020 | 3 | 3 | 67 | Julian Okwara | Detroit Lions | LB |
| 2020 | 4 | 7 | 113 | Troy Pride | Carolina Panthers | DB |
| 2020 | 5 | 1 | 147 | Khalid Kareem | Cincinnati Bengals | DE |
| 2020 | 6 | 7 | 186 | Alohi Gilman | Los Angeles Chargers | DB |
| 2021 | 2 | 10 | 42 | Liam Eichenberg | Miami Dolphins | T |
| 2021 | 2 | 16 | 48 | Aaron Banks | San Francisco 49ers | G |
| 2021 | 2 | 20 | 52 | Jeremiah Owusu-Koramoah | Cleveland Browns | LB |
| 2021 | 3 | 19 | 83 | Tommy Tremble | Carolina Panthers | TE |
| 2021 | 3 | 31 | 95 | Robert Hainsey | Tampa Bay Buccaneers | T |
| 2021 | 4 | 28 | 133 | Ian Book | New Orleans Saints | QB |
| 2021 | 5 | 27 | 171 | Daelin Hayes | Baltimore Ravens | DE |
| 2021 | 5 | 38 | 182 | Adetokunbo Ogundeji | Atlanta Falcons | DE |
| 2021 | 7 | 22 | 249 | Ben Skowronek | Los Angeles Rams | WR |
| 2022 | 1 | 14 | 14 | Kyle Hamilton | Baltimore Ravens | DB |
| 2022 | 5 | 21 | 164 | Kyren Williams | Los Angeles Rams | RB |
| 2023 | 2 | 4 | 35 | Michael Mayer | Las Vegas Raiders | TE |
| 2023 | 2 | 9 | 40 | Isaiah Foskey | New Orleans Saints | DE |
| 2023 | 6 | 24 | 201 | Jarrett Patterson | Houston Texans | C |
| 2024 | 1 | 5 | 5 | Joe Alt | Los Angeles Chargers | T |
| 2024 | 2 | 27 | 59 | Blake Fisher | Houston Texans | T |
| 2024 | 3 | 23 | 87 | Marist Liufau | Dallas Cowboys | LB |
| 2024 | 5 | 5 | 140 | Cam Hart | Los Angeles Chargers | DB |
| 2024 | 5 | 8 | 143 | JD Bertrand | Atlanta Falcons | LB |
| 2024 | 5 | 12 | 147 | Audric Estimé | Denver Broncos | RB |
| 2024 | 7 | 2 | 222 | Javontae Jean-Baptiste | Washington Commanders | DE |
| 2025 | 2 | 21 | 53 | Benjamin Morrison | Tampa Bay Buccaneers | DB |
| 2025 | 3 | 32 | 96 | Xavier Watts | Atlanta Falcons | DB |
| 2025 | 4 | 5 | 107 | Jack Kiser | Jacksonville Jaguars | LB |
| 2025 | 5 | 4 | 142 | Rylie Mills | Seattle Seahawks | DT |
| 2025 | 5 | 25 | 163 | Mitchell Evans | Carolina Panthers | TE |
| 2025 | 6 | 13 | 189 | Riley Leonard | Indianapolis Colts | QB |
| 2026 | 1 | 3 | 3 | Jeremiyah Love | Arizona Cardinals | RB |
| 2026 | 1 | 32 | 32 | Jadarian Price | Seattle Seahawks | RB |
| 2026 | 3 | 10 | 74 | Malachi Fields | New York Giants | WR |
| 2026 | 3 | 31 | 95 | Eli Raridon | New England Patriots | TE |
| 2026 | 5 | 20 | 160 | Billy Schrauth | Tampa Bay Buccaneers | G |
| 2026 | 6 | 29 | 210 | Gabriel Rubio | Pittsburgh Steelers | DT |

== Notable undrafted players ==
Note: No drafts held before 1936

| Debut Year | Player | Debut Team | Position | Notes |
|---|---|---|---|---|
| 1958 | Ed Cook | Chicago Cardinals | G | — |
| 1960 | Pat Heenan | Washington Redskins | DB | — |
| 1960 | Ken Adamson | Denver Broncos | G | — |
| 1962 | George Williams | Pittsburgh Steelers | DT | — |
| 1963 | Ed Rutkowski | Buffalo Bills | WR | — |
| 1965 | John Atamian | Philadelphia Eagles | G | — |
| 1966 | Joe Kantor | Washington Redskins | RB | — |
| 1968 | Steve Quinn | Houston Oilers | C | — |
| 1969 | Brian Stenger | Pittsburgh Steelers | LB | — |
| 1973 | James Bulger | Green Bay Packers | QB | — |
| 1975 | Tom Clements | Kansas City Chiefs | QB | — |
| 1977 | Tom Fine | Seattle Seahawks | T | — |
| 1979 | Tom Flynn | Dallas Cowboys | DB | — |
| 1980 | Randy Harrison | Pittsburgh Steelers | S | — |
| 1980 | Chuck Mate | Chicago Bears | K | — |
| 1980 | Mike Whittington | New York Giants | LB | — |
| 1981 | Greg Knafelc | Green Bay Packers | RB | — |
| 1982 | Tim Koegel | Denver Broncos | QB | — |
| 1982 | Dean Masztak | Chicago Bears | TE | — |
| 1983 | Joe Rudzinski | Green Bay Packers | LB | — |
| 1985 | Mark Brooks | Indianapolis Colts | FB | — |
| 1985 | Joe Johnson | Tampa Bay Buccaneers | WR | — |
| 1985 | Michael Johnston | Buffalo Bills | K | — |
| 1985 | Chris Smith | Kansas City Chiefs | RB | — |
| 1986 | Pat Ballage | Dallas Cowboys | DB | — |
| 1986 | Rick DiBernardo | St. Louis Cardinals | LB | — |
| 1986 | Ron Plantz | Tampa Bay Buccaneers | C | — |
| 1987 | Dave Butler | Cincinnati Bengals | LB | — |
| 1987 | John Carney | Cincinnati Bengals | K | Pro Bowl (1994), (2008) |
| 1987 | Shawn Heffern | Cleveland Browns | T | — |
| 1987 | Mike Kovaleski | Tampa Bay Buccaneers | LB | — |
| 1987 | Ron Weissenhofer | New Orleans Saints | LB | — |
| 1987 | Troy Wilson | Cleveland Browns | DB | — |
| 1990 | Pat Eilers | Minnesota Vikings | DB | — |
| 1993 | Junior Bryant | San Francisco 49ers | DT | — |
| 1993 | Justin Hill | Green Bay Packers | G | — |
| 1993 | Karmeeleyah McGill | Cincinnati Bengals | LB | — |
| 1993 | Brian Ratigan | Indianapolis Colts | LB | — |
| 1993 | Nick Smith | Green Bay Packers | LB | — |
| 1994 | Clint Johnson | Atlanta Falcons | WR | — |
| 1995 | Lee Becton | Green Bay Packers | RB | — |
| 1995 | Oscar McBride | Arizona Cardinals | TE | — |
| 1997 | Lyron Cobbins | Arizona Cardinals | LB | — |
| 1997 | Robert Farmer | New York Jets | RB | — |
| 1997 | Randy Kinder | Green Bay Packers | RB | — |
| 1998 | Mike Doughty | Cincinnati Bengals | T | — |
| 1999 | Bobbie Howard | Tampa Bay Buccaneers | LB | — |
| 1999 | Tim Ridder | Indianapolis Colts | T | — |
| 2000 | Bobby Brown | Green Bay Packers | WR | — |
| 2000 | Lamont Bryant | Washington Redskins | DE | — |
| 2000 | Deke Cooper | Carolina Panthers | DB | — |
| 2000 | Joey Goodspeed | Pittsburgh Steelers | FB | — |
| 2000 | Deveron Harper | Carolina Panthers | DB | — |
| 2001 | Lance Legree | New York Giants | DT | — |
| 2002 | Tony Fisher | Green Bay Packers | RB | — |
| 2002 | Jason Murray | Cincinnati Bengals | FB | — |
| 2002 | Kurt Vollers | Indianapolis Colts | T | — |
| 2003 | Ron Israel | Minnesota Vikings | DB | — |
| 2003 | Tom Lopienski | Indianapolis Colts | FB | — |
| 2005 | Mike Goolsby | St. Louis Rams | LB | — |
| 2005 | Ryan Grant^{†} | New York Giants | RB | Super Bowl Champion (Super Bowl XLV), Pro Bowl (2009) |
| 2005 | Carlyle Holiday | Arizona Cardinals | WR | — |
| 2005 | Greg Pauly | Chicago Bears | DT | — |
| 2006 | Mark LeVoir | Chicago Bears | T | — |
| 2006 | Corey Mays | New England Patriots | LB | — |
| 2007 | Darius Walker | Houston Texans | RB | — |
| 2008 | J. J. Jansen | Green Bay Packers | LS | Pro Bowl (2014) |
| 2010 | Sergio Brown | New England Patriots | DB | — |
| 2010 | Kyle McCarthy | Denver Broncos | DB | — |
| 2011 | Armando Allen | Tampa Bay Buccaneers | RB | — |
| 2011 | Ian Williams | San Francisco 49ers | DT | — |
| 2011 | Brian Smith | Cleveland Browns | LB | — |
| 2011 | Darrin Walls | Atlanta Falcons | DB | — |
| 2012 | Trevor Robinson | Cincinnati Bengals | C | — |
| 2013 | Mike Golic Jr. | Pittsburgh Steelers | LB | — |
| 2013 | Cierre Wood | Houston Texans | RB | — |
| 2014 | Dan Fox | New York Giants | LB | — |
| 2014 | Kona Schwenke | Kansas City Chiefs | DT | — |
| 2014 | Tommy Rees | Washington Redskins | QB | — |
| 2016 | Matthias Farley | Arizona Cardinals | DB | — |
| 2016 | Romeo Okwara | New York Giants | DE | — |
| 2016 | Ishaq Williams | New York Giants | DE | — |
| 2017 | Cole Luke | Carolina Panthers | DB | — |
| 2017 | James Onwualu | Los Angeles Chargers | LB | — |
| 2018 | Josh Adams | Philadelphia Eagles | RB | — |
| 2018 | Greer Martini | Green Bay Packers | LB | — |
| 2019 | Alex Bars | Chicago Bears | G | — |
| 2019 | Jonathan Bonner | Washington Redskins | DE | — |
| 2019 | Te'von Coney | Oakland Raiders | LB | — |
| 2019 | Sam Mustipher | Chicago Bears | C | — |
| 2019 | Tyler Newsome | Los Angeles Chargers | P | — |
| 2020 | Jalen Elliott | Detroit Lions | DB | — |
| 2020 | Asmar Bilal | Los Angeles Chargers | LB | — |
| 2020 | Jamir Jones | Houston Texans | LB | — |
| 2020 | Tony Jones Jr. | New Orleans Saints | RB | — |
| 2021 | Tommy Kraemer | Detroit Lions | G | — |
| 2021 | Brock Wright | Detroit Lions | TE | — |
| 2021 | Javon McKinley | Detroit Lions | WR | — |
| 2021 | Nick McCloud | Buffalo Bills | DB | — |
| 2022 | Kevin Austin Jr. | Jacksonville Jaguars | WR | — |
| 2022 | Jack Coan | Indianapolis Colts | QB | — |
| 2022 | Kurt Hinish | Houston Texans | DT | — |
| 2022 | Myron Tagovailoa-Amosa | Las Vegas Raiders | DT | — |
| 2023 | Jayson Ademilola | Jacksonville Jaguars | DL | — |
| 2023 | Justin Ademilola | Green Bay Packers | DL | — |
| 2023 | Bo Bauer | Seattle Seahawks | LB | — |
| 2023 | TaRiq Bracy | Houston Texans | CB | — |
| 2023 | Avery Davis | Detroit Lions | WR | — |
| 2023 | Blake Grupe | New Orleans Saints | K | — |
| 2023 | Brandon Joseph | Detroit Lions | S | — |
| 2023 | Josh Lugg | Chicago Bears | OL | — |
| 2023 | Chris Smith | Detroit Lions | DL | — |
| 2024 | Thomas Harper | Los Angeles Chargers | S | — |
| 2024 | Sam Hartman | Washington Commanders | QB | — |
| 2024 | Spencer Shrader | Indianapolis Colts | K | — |
| 2024 | Michael Vinson | Indianapolis Colts | LS | — |
| 2025 | Jordan Clark | New York Jets | S | — |
| 2025 | Beaux Collins | New York Giants | WR | — |
| 2025 | Howard Cross III | Cincinnati Bengals | DL | — |
| 2025 | Max Hurleman | Pittsburgh Steelers | CB | — |
| 2026 | Jordan Botelho | Minnesota Vikings | OLB | — |
| 2026 | Will Pauling | San Francisco 49ers | WR | — |
| 2026 | DeVonta Smith | Carolina Panthers | CB | — |
| 2026 | Jalen Stroman | San Francisco 49ers | S | — |
| 2026 | Aamil Wagner | Tennessee Titans | OT | — |
