= 1953 Notre Dame Fighting Irish football team =

American college football season

1953 Notre Dame Fighting Irish football

National champion (various selectors)
- Conference: Independent

Ranking
- Coaches: No. 2
- AP: No. 2
- Record: 9–0–1
- Head coach: Frank Leahy (11th season)
- Captain: Don Penza
- Home stadium: Notre Dame Stadium

1953 Midwestern college football independents records
	Conf.			Overall
Team	W	L	T	W		L		T
No. 2 Notre Dame		–		9	–	0	–	1
Cincinnati		–		9	–	1	–	0
Carthage		–		8	–	1	–	0
Youngstown		–		7	–	1	–	0
John Carroll		–		7	–	2	–	0
Washington University		–		7	–	2	–	0
Rose Poly		–		6	–	2	–	0
Wabash		–		6	–	2	–	1
Marquette		–		6	–	3	–	1
Baldwin–Wallace		–		4	–	4	–	0
Drake		–		4	–	4	–	0
Wayne		–		3	–	4	–	1
Dayton		–		3	–	5	–	1
Michigan Tech		–		2	–	5	–	0
Xavier		–		2	–	7	–	1
Rankings from AP Poll

The 1953 Notre Dame Fighting Irish football team was an American football team that represented the University of Notre Dame as an independent during the 1953 college football season. In their 11th and final season under head coach Frank Leahy, the Irish compiled a 9–0–1 record and outscored opponents by a total of 317 to 139. They won their first seven games, including victories over No. 6 Oklahoma and No. 4 Georgia Tech, and were ranked No. 1 in the AP poll through that time. After a tie with No. 20 Iowa on November 21, they dropped to No. 2 and remained in that spot in the final AP and UPI coaches polls. Twelve other selectors declared Notre Dame as the 1953 national champion.

Notre Dame halfback Johnny Lattner played on offense, defense, and special teams, won the Heisman Trophy and the Maxwell Award, and was a consensus first-team pick on the 1953 All-America college football team. Tackle Art Hunter was also a consensus All-American.

The team played its home games at Notre Dame Stadium in Notre Dame, Indiana.

== Schedule ==
Date	Opponent	Rank	Site	Result	Attendance	Source
September 26	at No. 6 Oklahoma	No. 1	Oklahoma Memorial Stadium; Norman, OK	W 28–21	59,500	
October 3	at Purdue	No. 1	Ross–Ade Stadium; West Lafayette, IN (rivalry)	W 37–7	49,135	
October 17	No. 15 Pittsburgh	No. 1	Notre Dame Stadium; Notre Dame, IN (rivalry)	W 23–14	57,998	
October 24	No. 4 Georgia Tech	No. 1	Notre Dame Stadium; Notre Dame, IN (rivalry)	W 27–14	58,254	
October 31	No. 20 Navy	No. 1	Notre Dame, IN (rivalry)	W 38–7	58,154	
November 7	at Penn	No. 1	Franklin Field; Philadelphia, PA	W 28–20	69,071	
November 14	at North Carolina	No. 1	Kenan Memorial Stadium; Chapel Hill, NC (rivalry)	W 34–14	43,000	
November 21	No. 20 Iowa	No. 1	Notre Dame Stadium; Notre Dame, IN	T 14–14	56,478	
November 28	at No. 20 USC	No. 2	Los Angeles Memorial Coliseum; Los Angeles, CA (rivalry)	W 48–14	97,952	
December 5	SMU	No. 2	Notre Dame Stadium; Notre Dame, IN	W 40–14	55,522	
Rankings from AP Poll released prior to the game; Source:

== Game summaries ==
=== Oklahoma ===
Team	1	2	3	4	Total
• No. 1 Notre Dame	7	7	14	0	28
No. 6 Oklahoma	7	7	0	7	21

- Date: September 26
- Location: Oklahoma Memorial Stadium, Norman, Oklahoma
- Game attendance: 59,500
- Game weather: Sunny • 94 °F (34 °C)

On September 26, Notre Dame opened its season with a 28–21 victory over Oklahoma before a sellout crowd of 59,500 in 94 degree heat at Memorial Stadium in Norman, Oklahoma. Quarterback Ralph Guglielmi ran for a touchdown and threw a touchdown pass to Joe Heap. Don Penza blocked and recovered a punt to set up one touchdown and recovered a fumble that led to another Notre Dame score. Fullback Neil Worden gained 78 rushing yards on 12 carries.

=== Purdue ===
Team	1	2	3	4	Total
• No. 1 Notre Dame	10	13	14	0	37
Purdue	0	7	0	0	7

- Date: October 3
- Location: Lafayette, IN
- Game attendance: 49,135

On October 3, Notre Dame defeated Purdue, 37–7, before a crowd of 49,135 at Ross–Ade Stadium in West Lafayette, Indiana. Purdue turned the ball over seven times on four fumbles and three interceptions. Johnny Lattner returned a kickoff 86 yards. With Notre Dame in control, Frank Leahy made extensive use of reserves, including Dick Fitzgerald who tallied 90 rushing yards on 10 carries. Ralph Guglielmi, a two-way player, intercepted a Purdue pass and completed seven of eight passes for 92 yards.

=== Pittsburgh ===
Team	1	2	3	4	Total
No. 15 Pittsburgh	7	7	0	0	14
• No. 1 Notre Dame	0	7	9	7	23

- Date: October 17
- Location: Notre Dame, IN
- Game attendance: 57,998

On October 17, Notre Dame defeated No. 15 Pittsburgh, 23–14, before a crowd of 57,998 at Notre Dame Stadium. After a "sputtering" performance in the first half, Notre Dame tallied a safety in the third quarter and held Pitt to three net yards rushing in the second half. Quarterback Ralph Guglielmi scored two rushing touchdowns in the second half. Neil Worden and Joe Heap led the Irish with 65 rushing yards each.

=== Georgia Tech ===
Team	1	2	3	4	Total
No. 4 Georgia Tech	0	0	7	7	14
• No. 1 Notre Dame	7	0	14	6	27

- Date: October 24
- Location: Notre Dame, IN
- Game attendance: 58,254

On October 24, in a matchup of top five teams, No. 1 Notre Dame defeated No. 4 Georgia Tech, 27–14, before a crowd of 58,254 at Notre Dame Stadium. Notre Dame scored on the game's opening drive and led, 7–0, at halftime. During the intermission, head coach Frank Leahy became dizzy, complained of chest pain, and lapsed into semi-consciousness. The university's executive vice president, who was also a priest, administered last rites prior to Leahy being rushed in ambulance to the hospital. The players returned to the field with tears streaming from their faces. The Irish rallied for two touchdowns in the third quarter.

=== Navy ===
Team	1	2	3	4	Total
No. 20 Navy	0	0	0	7	7
• No. 1 Notre Dame	0	26	6	6	38

- Date: October 31
- Location: Notre Dame, IN
- Game attendance: 58,154

On October 31, Notre Dame defeated Navy, 38–7, before a crowd of 58,154 at Notre Dame Stadium. Notre Dame head coach Frank Leahy did not attend the game, recuperating at home following his collapse during the Georgia Tech game. Notre Dame was held scoreless in the first 20 minutes of the game, but then scored four touchdowns, including a 57-yard interception return by Ralph Guglielmi, in the last 10 minutes of the first half. Assistant coach Joe McArdle, leading the team in Leahy's absence, kept the first-string players on the bench during the entire second half. Navy did not score until the final two minutes of the game. Notre Dame tallied 318 rushing yards in the game and reportely "could have rolled up 600 yards if the merciful McArdle hadn't elected to hold the score down."

=== Penn ===
Team	1	2	3	4	Total
• No. 1 Notre Dame	7	7	14	0	28
Penn	7	7	0	7	21

- Date: November 7
- Location: Philadelphia
- Game attendance: 69,071
- Game weather: Cloudy • 35 °F (2 °C)

On November 7, Notre Dame defeated Penn, 28–20, before a crowd of 69,071 at Franklin Field in Philadelphia. The Philadelphia Inquirer wrote that the two teams played inspired football, but the difference was Johnny Lattner who gave "probably the greatest individual performance witnessed here in more than a decade." Lattner had appeared the prior week on the cover of Sports Illustrated, yet "made a mockery of the jinx" associated with appearing on the cover. After Penn scored a touchdown on the opening drive, Lattner ensured that Penn's lead lasted only 15 seconds, as he returned the ensuing kickoff 92 yards with "lightning-like" speed for a touchdown. Lattner then provided "both spark and killing punch" for the Irish. He tallied 261 all-purpose yards, including another kickoff return of 56 yards, and intercepted a goal-line pass to halt Penn's final drive.

=== North Carolina ===
Team	1	2	3	4	Total
• No. 1 Notre Dame	7	14	7	6	34
North Carolina	0	7	0	7	14

- Date: November 14
- Location: Chapel Hill, NC
- Game attendance: 43,000

On November 14, Notre Dame defeated North Carolina, 34–14, before a crowd of 43,000 at Kenan Stadium in Chapel Hill, North Carolina. Notre Dame tallied 489 rushing yards. Fullback Neil Worden gained 151 yards on 15 carries and scored two touchdowns, breaking Notre Dame's career scoring record in his third year with the program.

=== Iowa ===
Team	1	2	3	4	Total
No. 20 Iowa	7	0	0	7	14
No. 1 Notre Dame	0	7	0	7	14

- Date: November 21
- Location: South Bend, IN
- Game attendance: 56,478

On November 21, Notre Dame played Iowa to a 14–14 tie at Notre Dame Stadium. Iowa scored first, and Iowa tied the game at 7–7 on the final play of the first half, as Ralph Guglielmi threw for a touchdown pass to Dan Shannon. Iowa retook the lead with 2:07 remaining in the game. With six seconds remaining, Notre Dame tied the game on a second touchdown pass from Guglielmi to Shannon. Notre Dame completed 12 of 30 passes for 129 yards and tallied 228 yards on the ground.

=== USC ===
Team	1	2	3	4	Total
• No. 2 Notre Dame	13	7	21	7	48
No. 20 USC	0	7	7	0	14

- Date: November 28
- Location: Los Angeles
- Game attendance: 97,952

On November 28, Notre Dame defeated USC, 48–11, before a crowd of 97,952 at the Los Angeles Memorial Coliseum. It was the most lopsided game in the history of the Notre Dame-USC football rivalry and was one point short of the record 49 points scored against USC in the 1948 Rose Bowl. Due to illness, coach Frank Leahy did not travel with the team to Los Angeles. Johnny Lattner tallied 157 rushing yards (9.5 yards per carry) and scored four touchdowns for Notre Dame. Neil Worden added 134 rushing yards, averaging just short of nine yards per carry.

=== SMU ===
Team	1	2	3	4	Total
SMU	0	0	7	7	14
• No. 2 Notre Dame	7	13	20	0	40

- Date: December 6
- Location: Notre Dame, IN
- Game attendance: 55,522

On December 6, Notre Dame defeated SMU, 40–14, before a national television audience and a crowd of 55,522 at Notre Dame Stadium. Neil Worden scored three touchdowns to finish his college career with a Notre Dame-record 29 touchdowns. Johnny Lattner added two touchdowns, including a 34-yard touchdown reception on a pass from Ralph Guglielmi. The victory concluded Frank Leahy's sixth undefeated season in 11 seasons as Notre Dame's head coach.

== National championship ==
On November 30, 1953, prior to Notre Dame's final regular-season victory over SMU, and prior to Maryland's Orange Bowl loss to Oklahoma, the Associated Press (AP) released its final poll. In that poll, Maryland tallied 3,365 points, edging Notre Dame's 3,149 points.

Also on November 30, the United Press Board of Coaches released the results of its final poll. In very close voting, the 35 coaches who participated ranked Maryland first with 326 points and Notre Dame second with 320 points—a difference of only six points or less than one percent of the total points.

In 1953, the final polls were taken in late November, prior to the bowl games. Maryland went on to lose in the 1954 Orange Bowl to Oklahoma – a team that Notre Dame had beaten in the regular season. Despite the fact that Maryland was no longer undefeated and had lost to a team Notre Dame had defeated, the results of the AP and UP polls remained final.

In addition to Oklahoma, Notre Dame and Maryland had one other opponent in common: North Carolina. North Carolina assistant coach was asked whether Notre Dame or Maryland was the best: "There's no hesitancy on his answer. 'It would be Notre Dame ... Too much power. They just take the ball and -- harumph!' He said making a sign of a tank going through some bramble bushes. ... Maryland is a great team. Plenty of speed, and smart. But I just don't think they could handle a team like Notre Dame..."

A dozen other selectors, both contemporaneous and retrospective, have declared Notre Dame as the 1953 national champion. Selectors choosing Notre Dame include:

1. Smith Touchdown Tendency System of Ratings. Dr. Allen N. Smith released his final ratings at the end of November 1953, ranking Notre Dame first, Maryland second, and Oklahoma third.
2. Litkenhous Ratings. The final Litkenhous Ratings, released on December 14, 1953, gave Notre Dame 110.4 power points, edging Maryland's 108.5 power points. Oklahoma was ranked No. 3, and Iowa, the only team that Notre Dame did not defeat, was ranked No. 7 by Litkenhous.
3. Houlgate System. In January 1954, Deke Houlgate revised his rankings after the bowl games. He ranked Notre Dame first, Oklahoma second, and Maryland third.
4. Billingsley Report
5. Boand System
6. DeVold System
7. Dunkel System
8. Helms Athletic Foundation
9. National Championship Foundation
10. Poling System
11. Sagarin Ratings and Sagarin's ELO-Chess method
12. Williamson System

== Departure of Frank Leahy ==
On January 31, 1954, Leahy, at age 45, announced that, for "reasons of health", he was stepping down as Notre Dame's head coach. His decision was described as "sudden" but "somewhat expected" after he collapsed during the Georgia Tech game and then missed two additional games in the remaining weeks of the season. In eleven years as Notre Dame's head coach, Leahy compiled an 87–11–9 record, including six undefeated seasons. His tenure was described as "one of the most successful coaching reigns in the history of the game." Leahy was replaced by Terry Brennan who at age 25 was the youngest head coach in Notre Dame football history.

== Personnel ==
=== Players ===
Don Penza

Johnny Lattner

- Jim Bigelow, quarterback, junior, Pittsburgh
- Pat Bisceglia, guard, sophomore
- Don Bucci, quarterback, junior
- Joe Bush, offensive tackle
- Walt Cabral, end, junior
- Tom Carey, backup quarterback, junior
- Ed Cook, guard, junior
- Wayne Edmonds, right tackle
- Dick Fitzgerald, halfback, sophomore
- Dick Frasor, guard and center
- John Gaffney, fullback
- Armando "Army" Galardo, halfback, senior
- Don George, end, sophomore
- Ralph Guglielmi, quarterback and defensive back, junior
- Joe Heap, end, junior, New Orleans
- Dick Hendricks, halfback, sophomore
- Art Hunter, offensive and defensive end
- Gene Kapish, end, sophomore
- Joe Katchik, defensive end
- Dick Keller, right halfback
- Bob Lasch, tackle
- Johnny Lattner,
- Jack Lee, right guard, junior
- Ray Lemek, left guard, sophomore
- Fred Mangialardi, end, senior
- Gene Martell, tackle
- Bob Martin, reserve quarterback, senior, Davenport, IA
- Paul Matz, defensive end, junior
- Menil "Minnie" Mavraides, middle guard and placekicker
- Tom McHugh, fullback
- Jim Mense, center
- Rockne Morrissey, senior (son of a Notre Dame player who played for Knute Rockne)
- George Nicula, tackle/guard, sophomore
- Art Nowack, center, Rochester, NY
- Sam Palumbo
- Tony Pasquesi, right tackle
- Don Penza,* No. 83, captain and right end
- Nick Raich, fullback, sophomore
- Bob Ready, tackle, junior
- Bob Rigali, halfback
- Dan Schaefer, quarterback, sophomore
- Jim Schrader, center and linebacker, senior
- Dan Shannon, end, junior
- Dick Szymanski
- Bob Taylor, guard and tackle
- Frank Varrichione, offensive and defensive tackle
- Dick Washington, halfback, sophomore
- Neil Worden,* fullback, senior
- Ben Zajeski, guard

=== Coaching staff ===
- Head coach: Elmer Layden
- Assistant coaches: John Druze (ends, chief scout), Joe McArdle (guards, interim HC vs Navy), Bill Earley (backfield), Bob McBride (tackles), Wayne Ziemba (centers), Fred Miller (volunteer coach, also president of Miller High Life Brewing Co.), Johnny Lujack (pressbox)
- Athletic director: Edward W. "Moose" Krause
- Trainer: Gene Paskiet
- Equipment superintendent: Jack McAllister
- Student managers: John Jarnot, Dan Hammer, Charlie Keller

== Statistics ==
Team statistics. The team outscored opponents by a total of 317 to 139.

On offense, they tallied 2,881 rushing yards (288.1 yards per game) and 958 passing yards (95.8 yards per game) for 3,839 yards of total offense (383.9 yards per game).

On defense, they gave up 1,207 rushing yards (120.7 per game) and 1,032 passing yards (103.2 per game) for a total of 2,239 yards (223.9 yards per game).

Rushing. The team's rushing leader was fullback Neil Worden with 859 yards on 145 carries, an average of 5.9 yards per carry. Lattner ranked second with 651 yards on 134 carries for an average of 4.9 yards per carry. They were followed by Tom McHugh (341 yards), Joe Heap (314 yards), Fitzgerald (254 yards), and Dan Schaefer (100 yards).

Passing. Ralph Guglielmi completed 52 of 113 passes (.460 completion percentage) with five interceptions for 792 yards and eight touchdowns. No other player completed more than four passes or tallied more than 55 passing yards.

Receiving. The team's leading receiver was Joe Heap with 22 receptions for 336 yards. Lattner was second with 14 catches for 204 yards and one touchdown. Dan Shannon ranked third on the team with seven catches for 138 yards and two touchdowns. Don Penza followed with seven catches for 113 yards and no touchdowns.

Scoring. The team's scoring leader was Neil Worden with 66 points on 11 touchdowns. Lattner followed with 54 points on nine touchdowns. Joe Heap ranked third with 42 points on six touchdowns, and Ralph Guglielmi followed with 41 points on six touchdowns and five point extra point kicks. Kicker "Minnie" Mavraides tallied 27 points on 24 extra points and one field goal.

Punting. Lattner was the team's leading punter with 29 punts for 1,014 yards, an average of 35.0 yards per punt.

Punt returns. Joe Heap led the team with seven punt returns for 143 yards and one touchdown. Lattner had 10 returns for 103 yards and no touchdowns.

Kickoff returns. Lattner led the team with eight kickoff returns for 321 yards (40-yard average) and two touchdowns. Worden had eight returns for 164 yards.

Interceptions. Ralph Guglielmi led the team with five interceptions for 47 yards and one touchdown. Lattner ranked second with four intereceptions for four yards.

Fumble recoveries. Don Penza led the team with five opponents' fumbles recovered. Hunter followed with three.

== Awards and honors ==
Notre Dame's Johnny Lattner, who starred on offense at right halfback, on defense at linebacker, and on special teams as punter and return specialist, won the Heisman Trophy as the outstanding player in college football; he received 1,850 points in the Heisman voting, edging Paul Giel who had 1,794 points. He was also first repeat winner of the Maxwell Award, having also received the honor in 1952. He was also a consensus first-team pick on the 1953 All-America college football team.

Tackle Art Hunter was also a consensus All-American, receiving first-team nonors from, among others, the All-America Board, the United Press (UP), Football Writers Association of America, the International News Service, and The Sporting News.

Right end Don Penza received second-team All-America honors from the UP. Penza was also captain of the 1953 team, having been elected to the position at the end of the 1952 season.

Fullback Neil Worden received third-team All-America honors from the UP.

== 1954 NFL draft ==
The following 12 Notre Dame players were selected in the 1954 NFL draft.

Player	Position	Round	Pick	Franchise
Art Hunter	T	1	3	Green Bay Packers
Johnny Lattner	RB	1	7	Pittsburgh Steelers
Neil Worden	B	1	9	Philadelphia Eagles
Jim Schrader	C	2	20	Washington Redskins
Fran Paterra	B	4	42	Chicago Bears
Menil Mavraides	G	4	45	Philadelphia Eagles
Tommy McHugh	B	6	62	Chicago Cardinals
Joe Katchik	E	10	118	Los Angeles Rams
Sam Palumbo	G	15	179	San Francisco 49ers
Don Penza	E	18	211	Pittsburgh Steelers
Entee Shine	E	27	322	Los Angeles Rams
Joe Bush	G	28	331	Pittsburgh Steelers
