= Menil Mavraides =

American football player (1931–1999)

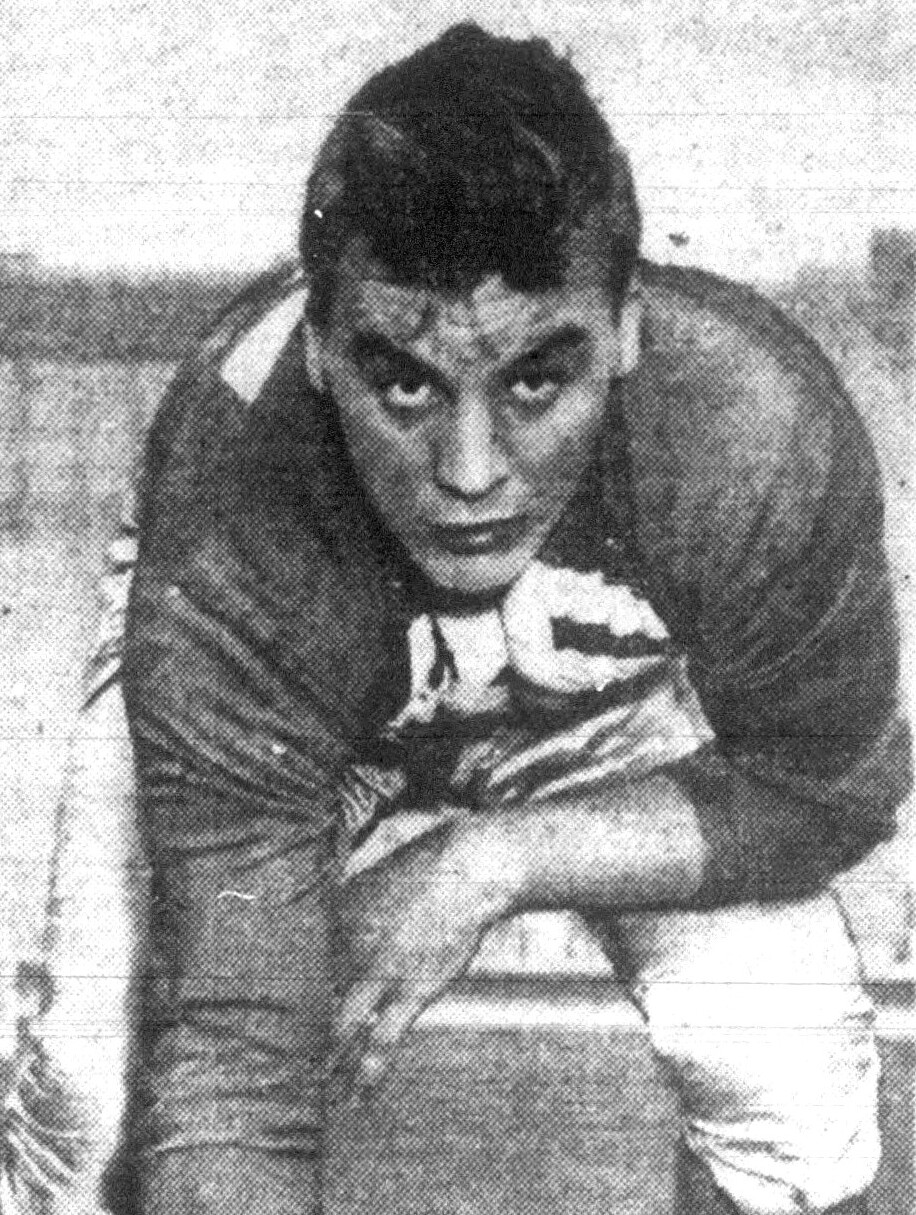
- Mavraides, circa 1953

No. 64, 65
- Position: Guard

Personal information
- Born: November 17, 1931; Lowell, Massachusetts, U.S.
- Died: June 5, 1999 (aged 67)
- Listed height: 6 ft 1 in (1.85 m)
- Listed weight: 235 lb (107 kg)

Career information
- High school: Lowell
- College: Notre Dame (1950–1953)
- NFL draft: 1954: 4thth round, 45th overall pick

Career history
- Philadelphia Eagles (1954, 1957); Washington Redskins (1958)*
- * Offseason or practice squad member only

Career NFL statistics
- Games played: 24
- Games started: 7
- Fumble recoveries: 2
- Stats at Pro Football Reference

Aristomeni S. Menil Mavraides (November 17, 1931 – June 5, 1999) was an American professional football guard for the Philadelphia Eagles of the National Football League in 1954 and 1957. With the nickname "Minnie", he was listed at 6' 2" and 220 lbs.

== Early life ==
Mavraides was born November 17, 1931, in Lowell, Massachusetts. He played for the Lowell High School Red Raiders football team under head coach Ray Riddick.

== College career ==
Mavraides went on to play for Notre Dame from 1950 to 1953. At Notre Dame he played under head coach Frank Leahy, who was the former line coach for the Seven Blocks of Granite where Learhy coached Mavraides' high school coach Ray Riddick. Here, Mavraides played shoulder-to-shoulder with Tackle Art Hunter, Center Jim Schrader, and Fullback Neil Worden as the main blockers for Heisman Trophy winning running back Johnny Lattner.

During his sophomore year, Mavraides was instrumental in helping the Irish beat the 9-0 Rose Bowl bound USC Trojans at home by recovering a late game fumble deep in Trojan territory.

His senior year, the 1953 Notre Dame finished the season 9-0-1 and was runner up to the National Championship, and had an unprecedented 12 players drafted to '54 NFL. Mavraides also finished his college career being ranked #1 in all NCAA with 27pts in kick scoring.

In the September 13, 1954 Sports Illustrated article Herman Hickman describes the 1953 Notre Dame Team by writing;

Frankly, it's hard to see how any squad could lose such men as halfback Johnny Lattner, fullback Neil Worden, tackle Art Hunter, center Jim Schrader, and guard Menil Mavraides and still be a top-ranked team. Each was on some All-American or other. Lattner, Worden and Hunter were first-round Pro draft choices. Schrader was a second-round choice. Mavraides a third. But Notre Dame is not an ordinary football team, it's Notre Dame... Notre Dame doesn't lose two often.

Before the start of the 1954 NFL season, Mavraides, joined four of his Fighting Irish classmates, in the 1954 summer classic College All-Star Game, where they lost 31 to 6 to the Detroit Lions in front of 93,000 fans.

== Later life ==
In 1986, Lowell High school inducted Mavraides into the LHS Athletic Hall of Fame.

Mavraides died on June 5, 1999, at the age of 67.
