= Ray Riddick =

American football player and coach (1917–1976)

No. 5, 19
- Position: End

Personal information
- Born: October 17, 1917; Lowell, Massachusetts, U.S.
- Died: July 14, 1976 (aged 58); Hampton, New Hampshire, U.S.
- Listed height: 6 ft 1 in (1.85 m)
- Listed weight: 211 lb (96 kg)

Career information
- High school: Lowell
- College: Fordham (1936–1939)
- NFL draft: 1940: undrafted

Career history

Playing
- Green Bay Packers (1940–1942, 1946)

Coaching
- Lowell (HS) (1947–1976) Head coach

Career NFL statistics
- Receptions: 20
- Receiving yards: 285
- Touchdowns: 1
- Stats at Pro Football Reference

Raymond Ernest Riddick (October 17, 1917 – July 1976) was an American football player and coach. He played professionally in the National Football League (NFL) as an end with the Green Bay Packers from 1940 to 1942 and in 1946.

== Early life ==
Born in Lowell, Massachusetts, on October 17, 1917, Riddick attended Lowell High School from 1932 to 1935, and then, before heading to college, the Archmere Academy, at the time an all-boys Roman Catholic preparatory boarding school in Claymont, Delaware.

== College career ==
Riddick attended Fordham University from 1936 to 1940, where he played football under head coach Jim Crowley, and line coach Frank Leahy, and alongside the Seven Blocks of Granite including Vince Lombardi. In Riddick's freshman year, Fordham went 5–0–2 before losing what Lombardi called, "the most devastating loss of [his] life," when the Rams lost, 7–6, to NYU, and their hopes of playing in the Rose Bowl. They finished the season ranked #15 in the AP Poll. His sophomore year, when he joined the team roster, the Rams' went undefeated with a 7–0–1 record, allowing only 16 points all season, and reaching #3 in the AP Poll. His junior year, the 1938 Rams' went 6–1–2, and lead the nation with just under 300 offensive yards per game, and finished the season #15 in the AP Poll. His senior year, Riddick played in the first-ever televised football game, as the Rams beat Waynesburg, 34–7. Fordham finished the season with a 6–2 record, and ranked #17 in the final AP Poll.

== Professional playing career and military service ==
Riddick enlisted in the United States Navy, and was part of the St. Mary's Pre-Flight Air Devils, stationed at St. Mary's College in Moraga, California, where he played intramural football along with many other pro and college football recruits. Between active duties, games were played by shifting around a 60-person roster. Games were mostly played between other makeshift military teams, and depleted college teams. In their first season (1942), St. Mary's Pre-Flight played 10 games, mostly against Pacific Coast Conference teams. In 1945 they played only seven games, just over half against college teams, as fewer and fewer programs remained intact during the war years.

After the war, Riddick returned to the Green Bay Packers, but only stayed one season before retiring from the NFL.

== Coaching career ==
After leaving the Packers, Riddick returned to Lowell as head coach of the Lowell High football team. Riddick soon built up the Lowell High Red Raider's as a nationally recognized power house. By 1949, Lowell high football was drawing crowds of 16,000 fans to watch their first undefeated Class A championship team, capped by a 55–0 thrashing of rival Lawrence.

According to a The Harvard Crimson article titled "No Coach Till Early March" published February 21, 1950, there was a buzz around Harvard University that Ray would succeed Arthur Valpey as head coach, but Riddick declined saying "You can't be interested in something you don't know anything about."

Lowell went undefeated for the next four years, with Julien LaCourse as quarterback, and, Lowell football continued to dominate of the Merrimack Valley Conference through the 1950s and 1960s.

Ray stayed as the head coach of Lowell High School until 1976, where he brought Lowell High to three national football championship playoffs, and became known as one of the America's greatest high school football coaches. In his 28-year career, he coached 10 teams to undefeated seasons. He also coached many kids who went on to play great college and professional football, including; his son Ray Jr. who went on to play for Yale, and Menil Mavraides Guard for Notre Dame and the Philadelphia Eagles.

In 1976, Riddick died at the age of 58.

== Honors ==
In 1977, Fordham University inducted Riddick into its Hall of Fame for Football. In 1986 Lowell High School opened the Raymond E. Riddick Field House in his honor, the same year he was inducted into the Lowell High School Athletic Hall of Fame. Many of Riddick's personal papers, photographs, scrapbooks, and playbook are stored in the Riddick Collection housed by the University of Lowell's Special Collections
