= Jim Schrader =

American football player (1932–1972)

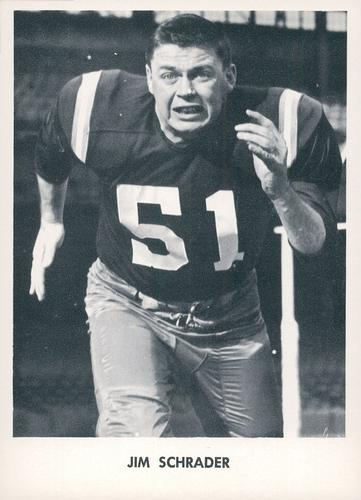

No. 51
- Positions: Center, tackle

Personal information
- Born: June 27, 1932; Weston, West Virginia, U.S.
- Died: January 16, 1972 (aged 39); Norristown, Pennsylvania, U.S.
- Listed height: 6 ft 2 in (1.88 m)
- Listed weight: 244 lb (111 kg)

Career information
- College: Notre Dame
- NFL draft: 1954: 2nd round, 20th overall pick

Career history
- Washington Redskins (1954–1961); Philadelphia Eagles (1962–1964)

Awards and highlights
- 3× Pro Bowl (1958-1959, 1961)

Career NFL statistics
- Games played: 116
- Games started: 92
- Fumble recoveries: 3
- Stats at Pro Football Reference

James Lee Schrader (June 27, 1932 – January 16, 1972) was an American professional football player who was a center and tackle in the National Football League (NFL) for the Washington Redskins and the Philadelphia Eagles from 1954 to 1964.

Schrader played college football for the Notre Dame Fighting Irish and was then selected by the Redskins in the second round of the 1954 NFL draft.

With the nickname "Big Jim" and listed at 6'-2" and 244 lbs, Schrader played in 116 NFL games, starting 48 of them.

Even though, in his 10-year career, Schrader never played for a team that finished with a winning record. he was a Pro Bowl selection in 1958, 1959 and 1961.

== College years ==
After graduating from Scott Township High School in Carnegie, Pennsylvania, he went on to the University of Notre Dame, where he played under head coach Frank Leahy who was the former line coach for the Seven Blocks of Granite and played shoulder-to-shoulder with Tackle Art Hunter Guard Menil Mavraides, and Fullback Neil Worden as the main blockers for Heisman Trophy winning running back Johnny Lattner.

His Senior year, the 1953 Notre Dame finished the season 9–1, and had an unprecedented 12 players drafted to '54 NFL.

Before the start of the 1954 NFL season, Schrader, joined four of his Fighting Irish classmates, in the 1954 summer classic College All-Star Game, where they lost 31–6 to the Detroit Lions in front of 93,000 fans.
