= Shrimp Bowl =

- Stadium: Public School Stadium
- Location: Galveston, Texas
- Operated: 1952, 1955–1959

The Shrimp Bowl was an annual American football bowl game held in Galveston, Texas. The successor to the Oleander Bowl, it was initially contested between two college football teams before becoming a game for top military service football teams.

== College bowl game ==
The inaugural Shrimp Bowl was held on December 27, 1952 and featured undefeated rivals Sam Houston State and Northeastern State. There was also a Shrimp Bowl Queen beauty pageant and the contestants served shrimp to fans during the game. Sam Houston State, led by 1952 Little All-American Don Gottlob, won the game 41–20.

== Military bowl game ==
The Shrimp Bowl was not played in 1953, but returned on January 2, 1955 as a contest between two of the top military service football teams – Fort Ord and Fort Hood. The 1955 Shrimp Bowl was the first game in Galveston’s history that featured racially integrated teams, as both clubs had several black players. The game was broadcast on radio by the American Forces Network. Fort Ord won the game 36–0. On December 18, 1955, Don Gottlob won his second Shrimp Bowl, as he quarterbacked Fort Hood to a 33–13 victory over the Little Creek Navy Gators. In 1956 game featured numerous former college football stars, including Bolling Air Force Base's Ralph Guglielmi, Bernie Faloney, Doyle Nix, Billy Reynolds, and Fort Hood's Dick Tamburo, Bobby Luna, and George Rosso. Bolling won the game 29–14. The Texas A&M Aggies football team, which was barred from post season play by the National Collegiate Athletic Association, were invited to the game – as spectators. Bolling returned the following year and defeated the San Diego Marines in front of a crowd of 9,000 – the largest in the game’s history. Eglin Air Force Base beat Brooke Army Medical Center in the 1958 contest to claim the mythical national championship. The final contest took place on December 13, 1959 and saw the Quantico Marines blowout McClellan Air Force Base 90–0 before only 3,500 spectators.

== All-time scores ==
Date played	Winning team		Losing team	
December 27, 1952	Sam Houston State	41	Northeastern State	20
January 2, 1955	Fort Ord	36	Fort Hood	0
December 18, 1955	Fort Hood	33	Little Creek	13
December 8, 1956	Bolling AFB	29	Fort Hood	14
December 15, 1957	Bolling AFB	28	San Diego Marines	7
December 14, 1958	Eglin AFB	15	Brooke Army Medical Center	7
December 13, 1959	Quantico Marines	90	McClellan AFB	0
