= Art Hunter =

American football player (1933–2009)

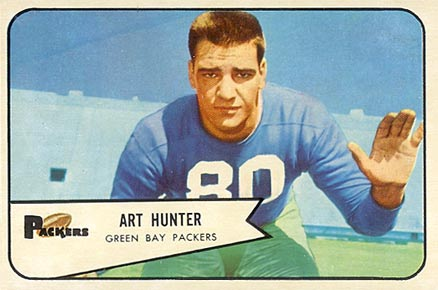
- Hunter on a 1954 Bowman football card

No. 70, 78, 56
- Positions: Offensive tackle, center

Personal information
- Born: April 24, 1933; Fairport Harbor, Ohio, U.S.
- Died: December 25, 2009 (aged 76); Tustin, California, U.S.
- Listed height: 6 ft 4 in (1.93 m)
- Listed weight: 245 lb (111 kg)

Career information
- High school: St. Vincent–St. Mary (Akron, Ohio)
- College: Notre Dame (1950–1953)
- NFL draft: 1954: 1st round, 3rd overall pick

Career history
- Green Bay Packers (1954–1955); Cleveland Browns (1956–1959); Los Angeles Rams (1960–1964); Pittsburgh Steelers (1965)

Awards and highlights
- Pro Bowl (1959); Second-team All-Pro (1960); Consensus All-American (1953)

Career NFL statistics
- Games played: 119
- Games started: 92
- Fumble recoveries: 4
- Stats at Pro Football Reference

Arthur Hunter (April 24, 1933 – December 25, 2009) was an American professional football player who was a tackle for 12 seasons in the National Football League (NFL), primarily for the Los Angeles Rams. He played college football for Notre Dame.

== Notre Dame years ==
At Notre Dame. Hunter played under head coach Frank Leahy who was the former line coach for the Seven Blocks of Granite and played shoulder-to-shoulder with guard Menil Mavraides, center Jim Schrader, and fullback Neil Worden as the main blockers for Heisman Trophy winning running back Johnny Lattner.

His senior year, the 1953 Notre Dame team finished the season 9–1, and had an unprecedented 12 players drafted to 1954 NFL draft.

== NFL career ==
Listed at 6' 4" and 245 lbs, Hunter first played for the Green Bay Packers as their number one draft choice (Number 3 overall). After not playing the 1955 season, Arthur, then went on to play under head coach Paul Brown, with Jim Brown and the rest of the Cleveland Browns for four seasons as Center. He then played Center for five years with the slumping Rams, and finally one year with the Steelers. Over Hunter's twelve seasons with the NFL he recovered four fumbles. In 1960, he was an AP second-team All-NFL selection.
