= Maxwell Award =

College football award

The Maxwell Award
- Awarded for: College Football Player of the Year Award
- Location: Ambler, Pennsylvania
- Country: United States
- Presented by: Maxwell Football Club

History
- First award: 1937
- Most recent: Indiana quarterback Fernando Mendoza
- Website: Maxwell Award

The Maxwell Award is presented annually to the college football player judged by a panel of sportscasters, sportswriters, and National Collegiate Athletic Association head coaches and the membership of the Maxwell Football Club to be the best all-around in the United States. The award is named after Robert "Tiny" Maxwell, a Swarthmore College football player, coach, and sportswriter. Johnny Lattner (1952, 1953) and Tim Tebow (2007, 2008) are the only players to have won the award twice. It is the college equivalent of the Bert Bell Award of the National Football League, also given out by the Maxwell Club.

== Winners ==
List of Maxwell Award winners
Year	Player	Pos.	School	Ref
1937	Clint Frank	HB	Yale	
1938	Davey O'Brien	QB	TCU	
1939	Nile Kinnick	HB	Iowa	
1940	Tom Harmon	HB	Michigan	
1941	Bill Dudley	HB, S, KR	Virginia	
1942	Paul Governali	QB	Columbia	
1943	Bob Odell	HB	Penn	
1944	Glenn Davis	HB	Army	
1945	Doc Blanchard	FB	Army (2)	
1946	Charley Trippi	HB, QB, P	Georgia	
1947	Doak Walker	HB, K	SMU	
1948	Chuck Bednarik	C, LB	Penn (2)	
1949	Leon Hart	E	Notre Dame	
1950	Reds Bagnell	HB	Penn (3)	
1951	Dick Kazmaier	HB	Princeton	
1952	Johnny Lattner	HB	Notre Dame (2)	
1953	Johnny Lattner (2)	HB	Notre Dame (3)	
1954	Ron Beagle	E	Navy	
1955	Howard Cassady	HB	Ohio State	
1956	Tommy McDonald	HB	Oklahoma	
1957	Bob Reifsnyder	T	Navy (2)	
1958	Pete Dawkins	HB	Army (3)	
1959	Richie Lucas	QB	Penn State	
1960	Joe Bellino	HB	Navy (3)	
1961	Bob Ferguson	FB	Ohio State (2)	
1962	Terry Baker	QB	Oregon State	
1963	Roger Staubach	QB	Navy (4)	
1964	Glenn Ressler	G	Penn State (2)	
1965	Tommy Nobis	G, LB	Texas	
1966	Jim Lynch	LB	Notre Dame (4)	
1967	Gary Beban	QB	UCLA	
1968	O. J. Simpson	RB	USC	
1969	Mike Reid	DT	Penn State (3)	
1970	Jim Plunkett	QB	Stanford	
1971	Ed Marinaro	RB	Cornell	
1972	Brad Van Pelt	S	Michigan State	
1973	John Cappelletti	RB	Penn State (4)	
1974	Steve Joachim	QB	Temple	
1975	Archie Griffin	RB	Ohio State (3)	
1976	Tony Dorsett	RB	Pittsburgh	
1977	Ross Browner	DE	Notre Dame (5)	
1978	Chuck Fusina	QB	Penn State (5)	
1979	Charles White	RB	USC (2)	
1980	Hugh Green	DE	Pittsburgh (2)	
1981	Marcus Allen	RB	USC (3)	
1982	Herschel Walker	RB	Georgia (2)	
1983	Mike Rozier	RB	Nebraska	
1984	Doug Flutie	QB	Boston College	
1985	Chuck Long	QB	Iowa (2)	
1986	Vinny Testaverde	QB	Miami (FL)	
1987	Don McPherson	QB	Syracuse	
1988	Barry Sanders	RB	Oklahoma State	
1989	Anthony Thompson	RB	Indiana	
1990	Ty Detmer	QB	BYU	
1991	Desmond Howard	WR, RS	Michigan (2)	
1992	Gino Torretta	QB	Miami (FL) (2)	
1993	Charlie Ward	QB	Florida State	
1994	Kerry Collins	QB	Penn State (6)	
1995	Eddie George	RB	Ohio State (4)	
1996	Danny Wuerffel	QB	Florida	
1997	Peyton Manning	QB	Tennessee	
1998	Ricky Williams	RB	Texas (2)	
1999	Ron Dayne	RB	Wisconsin	
2000	Drew Brees	QB	Purdue	
2001	Ken Dorsey	QB	Miami (FL) (3)	
2002	Larry Johnson	RB	Penn State (7)	
2003	Eli Manning	QB	Ole Miss	
2004	Jason White	QB	Oklahoma (2)	
2005	Vince Young	QB	Texas (3)	
2006	Brady Quinn	QB	Notre Dame (6)	
2007	Tim Tebow	QB	Florida (2)	
2008	Tim Tebow (2)	QB	Florida (3)	
2009	Colt McCoy	QB	Texas (4)	
2010	Cam Newton	QB	Auburn	
2011	Andrew Luck	QB	Stanford (2)	
2012	Manti Te'o	LB	Notre Dame (7)	
2013	A. J. McCarron	QB	Alabama	
2014	Marcus Mariota	QB	Oregon	
2015	Derrick Henry	RB	Alabama (2)	
2016	Lamar Jackson	QB	Louisville	
2017	Baker Mayfield	QB	Oklahoma (3)	
2018	Tua Tagovailoa	QB	Alabama (3)	
2019	Joe Burrow	QB	LSU	
2020	DeVonta Smith	WR	Alabama (4)	
2021	Bryce Young	QB	Alabama (5)	
2022	Caleb Williams	QB	USC (4)	
2023	Michael Penix Jr.	QB	Washington	
2024	Ashton Jeanty	RB	Boise State	
2025	Fernando Mendoza	QB	Indiana (2)	
