= Don Penza =

American football player, coach, and politician (1932–1989)

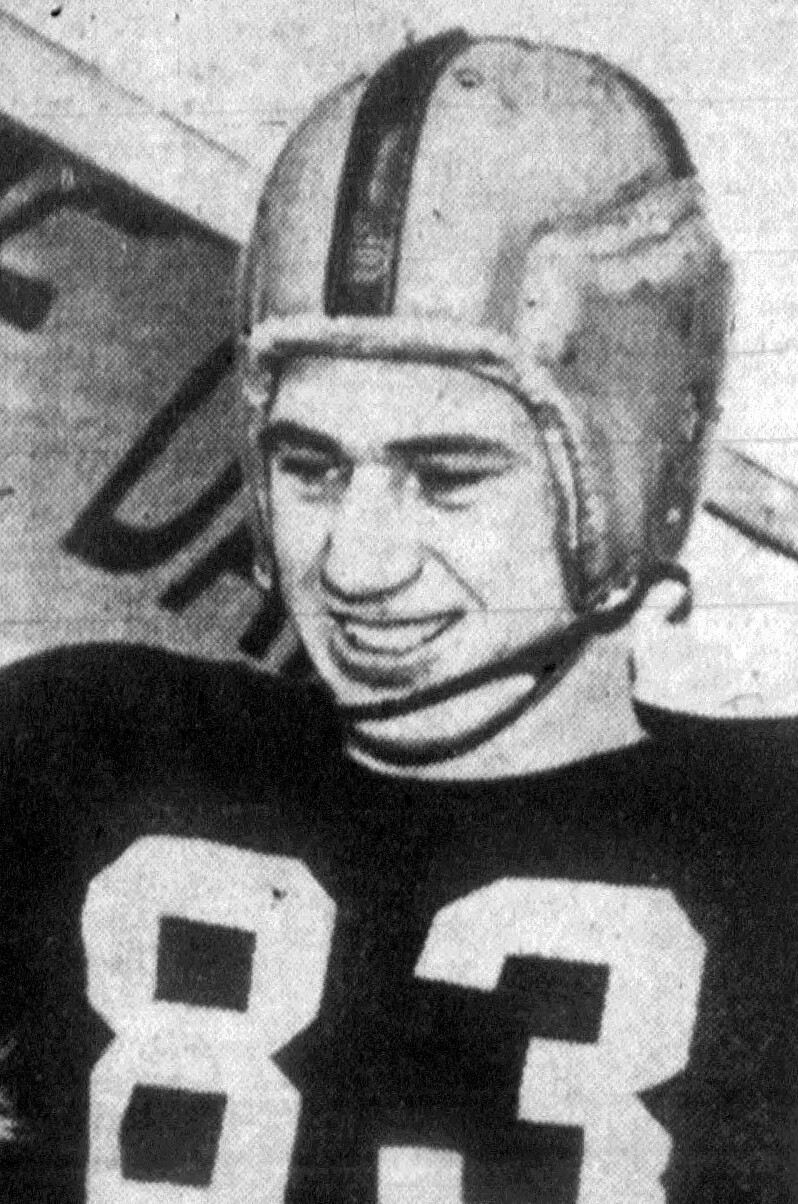
Penza, circa 1953

Donald Francis Penza (February 4, 1932 – April 8, 1989) was an American football player, coach, and politician.

== Education and playing career ==
Born in Kenosha, Wisconsin, Penza attended St. Catherine's High School and was a graduate of the class of 1950. He was three-year football letterman. He went on to study at the University of Notre Dame, where he captained the 1953 Notre Dame Fighting Irish football team. Legendary coach Frank Leahy called him "the best captain I’ve ever had.” He was also a member of the 1953 College Football All-America Team. From 1954 to 1956, he served in the United States Marine Corps as company commander with the rank of First Lieutenant and played for the football for the Quantico Devil Dogs. In the 1954 NFL draft, he was the taken in the 18th round as the 211th overall pick by the Pittsburgh Steelers but only played in two exhibitions before a knee injury ended his pro career.

== Coaching and political career ==
He went on to coach football at Assumption High School (Wisconsin) from 1957 to 1967, where he compiled a 68–18–2 record that included five conference titles. He retired at age 35 to enter politics. In 1968, he was elected Mayor of Wisconsin Rapids, Wisconsin, a position he held until 1978. In 1981, he returned to coaching and was hired as the head football coach of Marian Central Catholic High School. He guided the Hurricanes to three Class 2A state football championships with a record of 90–18 over eight seasons.

He died in Woodstock, Illinois, on April 8, 1989, at the age of 57.

== Awards and honors ==
- 1953 United Press International second-team All-American
- 1972 Wisconsin Rapids Chamber of Commerce's Citizen of the Year award
- 1985 Courier-News Coach of the Year
- 1990 inducted into Illinois High School Football Coaches Association's Hall of Fame
- 1999 inducted into St. Catherine's High School's Athletic Hall of Fame
- 2000 inducted into Marian Central High School's Hall of Fame
- 2002 inducted into Assumption High School's Hall of Fame
