= Tom McHugh (American football) =

American baseball and football coach (1932–2019)

Biographical details
- Born: May 13, 1932; Toledo, Ohio, U.S.
- Died: November 27, 2019 (aged 87); Mt. Vernon, Ohio, U.S.

Playing career

Football
- 1950–1953: Notre Dame
- 1954: Ottawa Rough Riders
- Position: Fullback

Coaching career (HC unless noted)

Football
- 1956–1963: Toledo Central Catholic HS (OH)
- 1978–1982: Kenyon

Baseball
- 1968–1983: Kenyon

Head coaching record
- Overall: 18–27 (college football); 58–214–1 (college baseball)

Accomplishments and honors

Awards
- Football; OAC Coach of the Year (1981)

Thomas F. McHugh (May 13, 1932 – November 27, 2019) was an American gridiron football player and coach and college baseball coach. He was a standout player at the University of Notre Dame where he was a member of the undefeated 1953 Notre Dame Fighting Irish football team under head coach Frank Leahy. McHugh served as the head football coach at Kenyon College in Gambier, Ohio from 1978 to 1982, compiling a record of 18–27. He served as the head baseball coach at Kenyon from 1968 to 1983.

McHugh was selected in the sixth round by the Chicago Cardinals in the 1954 NFL draft.

As a high school coach at Central Catholic High School in Toledo, Ohio, McHugh coached future Michigan State and National Football League (NFL) star Bubba Smith. He was the brother of Toledo mayor John McHugh.

McHugh died in Mt. Vernon, Ohio on November 27, 2019, at the age of 87.

== Head coaching record ==
=== College football ===
Year	Team	Overall	Conference	Standing	Bowl/playoffs
Kenyon Lords (Ohio Athletic Conference) (1978–1982)
1978	Kenyon	3–6	NA	NA	
1979	Kenyon	2–7	NA	NA	
1980	Kenyon	3–6	1–4	T–5th (Red)	
1981	Kenyon	5–4	2–3	T–4th (Red)	
1982	Kenyon	5–4	NA	NA	
Kenyon:		18–27	3–7		
Total:		18–27			
