= 1952 Little All-America college football team =

American college football all-star team

The 1952 Little All-America college football team is composed of college football players from small colleges and universities who were selected by the Associated Press (AP) as the best players at each position. For 1952, the AP followed the precedent established in 1951 by selecting three separate groups: a first team consisting of separate offensive and defensive platoons, and a second team consisting of 11 players.

== First team ==
Position	Player	Team
Offense
B	Don Gottlob	Sam Houston State
B	Al Conway	William Jewell
B	Ralph Di Micco	Alfred
B	Steve Trudnak	Lenoir–Rhyne
E	Joe Kirven	Presbyterian
E	Tony Chambers	UMass
T	Robert Lade	Peru State
T	Tom Fann	Tennessee Tech
G	Jodie Connell	Jacksonville State
G	Pete Swanson	Whitworth
C	Lou Bohnsack	Iowa State Teachers
Defense
DE	Al Feeney	Case
DE	Charles Kuehn	McNeese State
DT	Lester Lagod	Chattanooga
DT	Cal Roberts	Gustavus Adolphus
MG	Donald Bardell	Rochester
MG	Charles Weber	West Chester
LB	Robert Wiechard	Kings Point
LB	Ted Levenhagen	La Crosse State
DB	Ron Billings	Pacific Lutheran
DB	Wally Bullington	Abilene Christian
DB	Neil Garrett	Nevada

== Second team ==
Position	Player	Team
B	Frank Buchiewicz	Pacific
B	Bruce Bigford	Lawrence
B	Bucky McElroy	Mississippi Southern
B	Jimmy Feix	Western Kentucky
E	Jim Ladd	Bowling Green
E	Jack Abell	Wofford
T	Bruno Ashley	East Texas State
T	Robert Jennings	South Dakota
G	Ron Hoffman	St. Lawrence
G	La Vern Robbins	Midwestern (TX)
C	Frank Treuchert	Springfield (MA)

== See also ==
- 1952 College Football All-America Team
