= Joe Heap =

American football player (1931–2011)

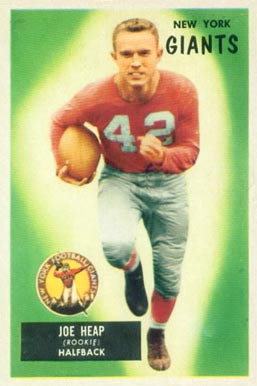
- Heap on a 1955 Bowman football card

No. 48
- Position: Halfback

Personal information
- Born: October 26, 1931; Abita Springs, Louisiana, U.S.
- Died: April 6, 2011 (aged 79); New Orleans, Louisiana, U.S.
- Listed height: 5 ft 11 in (1.80 m)
- Listed weight: 185 lb (84 kg)

Career information
- High school: Holy Cross (New Orleans)
- College: Notre Dame (1951–1954)
- NFL draft: 1955: 1st round, 8th overall pick

Career history
- New York Giants (1955)

Career NFL statistics
- Rushing yards: 29
- Average: 3.6
- Rushing touchdowns: 0
- Stats at Pro Football Reference

Joseph Lawrence Heap (October 26, 1931 – April 6, 2011) was an American professional football halfback who played for the National Football League's (NFL) New York Giants during the 1955 season.

Born in Abita Springs, Louisiana, Heap played his high school football at Holy Cross High School, New Orleans, from 1947 to 1950. There, he earned four varsity letters as a football player and three in track and field. He was a starter for three seasons and scored 55 touchdowns for Holy Cross High School, graduating in 1951. Although Heap considered attending Loyola University New Orleans and continuing to participate in track events, he decided to enroll at the University of Notre Dame.

At Notre Dame, Heap started at the halfback position from 1952 to 1954, and was an Academic All-American three times; as of 2011, he is the only Notre Dame football player to be named to the Academic All-America team that many times. He also holds the record for receiving yards by a Notre Dame halfback, with 1,137 for his career. Heap was Notre Dame's receptions leader in each season he was a starter, catching 71 passes in his college career. Notre Dame head coach Frank Leahy said that Heap "could run, pass, kick, receive passes and run back kickoffs better than anyone I've ever coached."

In the 1955 NFL draft, the Giants selected Heap in the first round, with the eighth overall pick. Heap played one season in New York, appearing in 12 games and rushing for 29 yards in 8 attempts; he also returned kicks and punts. Following 1955, Heap joined the United States Air Force for three years of service, ultimately becoming a lieutenant colonel. Heap took a position with Shell Oil Company, and spent 30 years there. He became a member of the Sugar Bowl/Greater New Orleans Sports Hall of Fame in 2008. In 2011, when he was 79 years old, Heap died.
