= Ralph Guglielmi =

American football player (1933–2017)

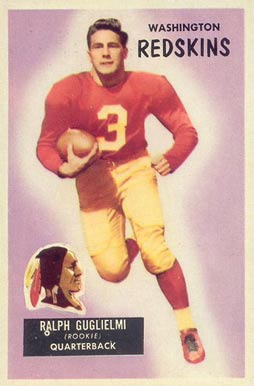
- Guglielmi on a 1955 Bowman football card

No. 3, 9, 17
- Position: Quarterback

Personal information
- Born: June 26, 1933; Columbus, Ohio, U.S.
- Died: January 23, 2017 (aged 83); Wallace, North Carolina, U.S.
- Listed height: 6 ft 1 in (1.85 m)
- Listed weight: 196 lb (89 kg)

Career information
- High school: Grandview Heights (Grandview Heights, Ohio)
- College: Notre Dame (1951–1954)
- NFL draft: 1955: 1st round, 4th overall pick

Career history
- Washington Redskins (1955, 1958–1960); St. Louis Cardinals (1961); New York Giants (1962–1963); Philadelphia Eagles (1963)

Awards and highlights
- Unanimous All-American (1954)

Career NFL statistics
- Passing attempts: 626
- Passing completions: 292
- Completion percentage: 46.6%
- TD–INT: 24–52
- Passing yards: 4,119
- Passer rating: 46.5
- Rushing yards: 633
- Rushing touchdowns: 2
- Stats at Pro Football Reference
- College Football Hall of Fame

Ralph Vincent Guglielmi (June 26, 1933 – January 23, 2017), sometimes known by the nickname "the Goog", was an American football quarterback.

Guglielmi played college football for Notre Dame from 1951 to 1954, leading the 1953 team to a 9–0–1 record and the 1954 team to a 9–1 record. He was a unanimous All-American pick in 1954 and finished fourth in the Heisman Trophy voting. He was inducted into the College Football Hall of Fame in 2001.

Gugilelmi also played nine season in the National Football League (NFL) for the Washington Redskins (1955–1960), St. Louis Cardinals (1961), New York Giants (1962–1963), and Philadelphia Eagles (1963). In 1960, he ranked among the NFL leaders with 125 completed passes (fifth), 1,547 passing yards (seventh), 19 interceptions (fourth), and 320 yards lost on sacks (first).

== Early life ==
Guglielmi was born in 1933 in Columbus, Ohio. He played high school football at Grandview Heights High School in Columbus.

== Notre Dame ==
Guglielmi played college football at the University of Notre Dame from 1951 to 1954. He led the 1952, 1953, and 1954 Notre Dame teams to a combined record of 25–3–2. As a senior in 1954, he ranked fourth in the nation with 1,160 passing yards (68 of 127 passes) and led Notre Dame to a 9–1 record and the No. 4 ranking in the AP poll. At the end of the 1954 season, he won the Walter Camp Memorial Trophy as the best collegiate back, was a consensus first-team pick as the quarterback on the 1954 All-America college football team and finished fourth in the Heisman Trophy voting. Guglielmi also set Notre Dame records with 3,117 passing yards and 34 consecutive games completing a pass (four games in 1951 and 10 each in 1952, 1953, and 1954). He also played on defense where he tallied 10 interceptions (five each in 1953 and 1954).

== Professional football ==
Guglielmi was selected by the Washington Redskins in the first round, fourth overall pick, of the 1955 NFL draft. He played for the Redskins in 1955, then entered the United States Air Force. He was a member of the Bolling Air Force Base team that included Bernie Faloney, Doyle Nix, and Billy Reynolds and won the Shrimp Bowl in 1956 and 1957. He returned to the Redskins in 1958. In 1960, he fourth in the NFL with a 56.1% pass completion percentage, sixth with 1,474 yards of total offense, and seventh with 1,547 passing yards. He also ranked fourth in the NFL with 19 interceptions.

On September 12, 1961, the Redskins traded Guglielmi to the St. Louis Cardinals in exchange for George Izo. Guglielmi appeared in nine games for the Cardinals, completing 56 of 116 passes for 927 yards.

In May 1962, the Cardinals traded Guglielmi to the New York Giants in exchange for Bill Triplett and a high 1963 draft pick. Guglielmi was a backup to Y. A. Tittle in 1962, completing 14 of 31 passes for 210 yards.

In 1963, Guglielmi began the season with the Giants but was traded to the San Francisco 49ers on September 24, 1963. Guglielmi quit the NFL rather than report to the 49ers. He was then signed by the Philadelphia Eagles on October 24, 1961. He appeared in six games in 1963 (four for the Giants, two for the Eagles), completing seven of 24 passes for 118 yards, zero touchdowns, and three interceptions.

Guglielmi played seven years in the NFL, appeared in 66 games (27 as a starter), completed 292 of 626 passes (46.6%) for 4,119 yards, 24 touchdowns, 52 interceptions, and a 46.5 quarterback rating.

== Later life ==
After retiring from his playing career, Guglielmi owned a Cadillac automobile dealership and restaurants in the Washington–Baltimore metropolitan area. He also founded a computer forms company and worked as an insurance agent. He was married to Linda Doeringer and had a son, Ralph David Guglielmi and Lisa Marie Hoffman.

Guglielmi was inducted into the College Football Hall of Fame in 2001.

Guglielmi moved to Wallace, North Carolina, in 2003. He died in January 2017 at age 83 due to complications from a stroke in Wallace, North Carolina.
