= Joe Katchik =

American football player (1931–2014)

No. 73
- Position: Defensive tackle

Personal information
- Born: January 9, 1931; Plymouth, Pennsylvania, U.S.
- Died: February 9, 2014 (aged 83); Bound Brook, New Jersey, U.S.
- Listed height: 6 ft 9 in (2.06 m)
- Listed weight: 290 lb (132 kg)

Career information
- High school: Ward P. Davenport (Plymouth); Wyoming Seminary (Kingston, PA)
- College: Dickinson College
- NFL draft: 1954: 10th round, 118th overall pick

Career history
- Los Angeles Rams (1955)*; New York Titans (1960)
- * Offseason or practice squad member only
- Stats at Pro Football Reference

Joseph Katchik Jr. (January 9, 1931 – February 9, 2014) was an American professional football defensive tackle who played one season with the New York Titans of the American Football League (AFL). He was drafted by the Los Angeles Rams of the National Football League (NFL) in the tenth round of the 1954 NFL draft. Katchik played college football at the University of Notre Dame and Dickinson College.

== Early life ==
Katchik was born at Plymouth, Pennsylvania, where he was educated in the public schools. From 1949 to 1950, he prepared for college at Wyoming Seminary in Kingston, Pennsylvania.

== College career ==
Katchik first played college football for the Notre Dame Fighting Irish. He transferred to play football and basketball for the Dickinson Red Devils of Dickinson College.

== Professional career ==
Katchik was selected by the Los Angeles Rams of the NFL in the tenth round with the 118th pick in the 1954 NFL draft. He played in two games for the AFL's New York Titans during the 1960 season.

== Personal life ==
Katchik died on February 9, 2014, in Bound Brook, New Jersey.
