= Sam Palumbo =

American football player (born 1932)

- Palumbo with the Cleveland Browns

No. 50, 54, 53
- Positions: Linebacker, center

Personal information
- Born: June 7, 1932 (age 94); Cleveland, Ohio, U.S.
- Listed height: 6 ft 2 in (1.88 m)
- Listed weight: 226 lb (103 kg)

Career information
- High school: Collinwood (Cleveland)
- College: Notre Dame (1951–1954)
- NFL draft: 1955: 4th round, 49th overall pick

Career history
- Cleveland Browns (1955–1956); Green Bay Packers (1957); Buffalo Bills (1960)

Awards and highlights
- NFL champion (1955)

Career NFL/AFL statistics
- Interceptions: 1
- Stats at Pro Football Reference

Sam Palumbo (born June 7, 1932) is an American former professional football linebacker who played in the National Football League (NFL). He was selected by the Cleveland Browns in the fourth round of the 1955 NFL draft and played two seasons with the team. During the 1957 NFL season he played with the Green Bay Packers and later was a member of the Buffalo Bills of the American Football League (AFL).

Although he suffered a shoulder dislocation diving for a fumble in a game against the Green Bay Packers in October 1955, Palumbo played in the NFL Championship Game on December 26, intercepting a pass in the second half of the Browns' 38–14 victory over the Los Angeles Rams.

As a student-athlete at the University of Notre Dame, he was a college roommate of Regis Philbin.

After retiring from pro football, Palumbo joined the Cleveland Football Officials Association and remained active as an official for more than 40 years at the high school and collegiate level, mentoring countless newer officials during that time. On September 15, 2016, Palumbo was inducted into the Greater Cleveland Sports Hall of Fame.
