= Johnny Lattner =

American football player, Heisman Trophy winner (1932–2016)

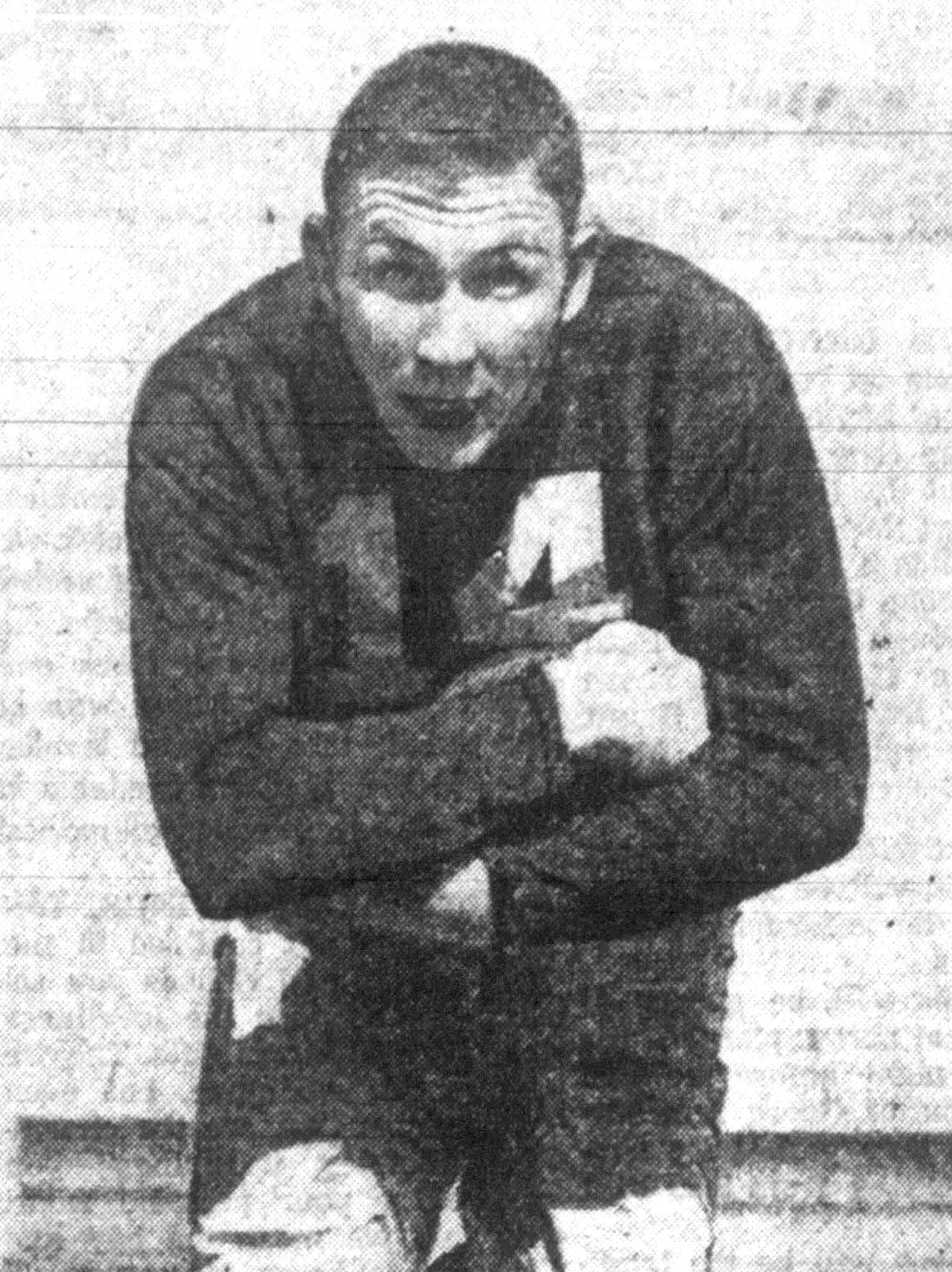
- Lattner in 1953

No. 41
- Position: Halfback

Personal information
- Born: October 24, 1932; Chicago, Illinois, U.S.
- Died: February 12, 2016 (aged 83); Melrose Park, Illinois, U.S.
- Listed height: 6 ft 1 in (1.85 m)
- Listed weight: 195 lb (88 kg)

Career information
- High school: Fenwick (Oak Park, Illinois)
- College: Notre Dame (1951–1953)
- NFL draft: 1954: 1st round, 7th overall pick

Career history
- Pittsburgh Steelers (1954)

Awards and highlights
- Pro Bowl (1954); Heisman Trophy (1953); 2× Maxwell Award (1952, 1953); SN Player of the Year (1953); Unanimous All-American (1952); Consensus All-American (1953)

Career NFL statistics
- Rushing yards: 237
- Rushing average: 3.4
- Rushing touchdowns: 5
- Receptions: 25
- Receiving yards: 305
- Receiving touchdowns: 2
- Stats at Pro Football Reference
- College Football Hall of Fame

John Joseph Lattner (October 24, 1932 – February 12, 2016) was an American football player who was a halfback. He played college football for the Notre Dame Fighting Irish, winning the Heisman Trophy in 1953 and the Maxwell Award in both 1952 and 1953. He also played professionally in the National Football League (NFL) for one season with the Pittsburgh Steelers in 1954.

== Football career ==
Lattner starred in both football and basketball at Fenwick High School in Oak Park, Illinois, where he graduated in 1950. Fenwick, along with other Chicago-area Catholic schools, was a training ground for Notre Dame and Big Ten football programs, and Lattner held offers from top college football programs across the country. He initially considered the University of Michigan because head coach Bennie Oosterbaan ran the single wing offense, a scheme that fit Lattner well at Fenwick. Lattner eventually chose Notre Dame, which offered a Catholic education and the highest level of competition.

Lattner played halfback for the University of Notre Dame under head coach Frank Leahy from 1950 to 1953. He won the Heisman Trophy in 1953, and won the Maxwell Award twice, in 1952 and 1953. In 1953, the Irish went 9–0–1, finishing second to Maryland in the final Associated Press poll. Lattner rushed for 651 yards (averaging 4.9 yards per carry) and scored nine touchdowns, caught 14 passes for 204 yards, had four interceptions and tallied two touchdowns on only 10 kickoff returns.

Lattner appeared on the cover of Time Magazine on November 9, 1953, with the caption "a bread and butter ball carrier", a phrase bestowed upon Lattner by Leahy.

In 1954, Lattner was selected in the first round of the 1954 NFL draft by the Pittsburgh Steelers, and played with them for one season before entering the United States Air Force for two years. There, during a football game, he suffered a severe knee injury that prevented him from playing professional football again. Lattner's single season in Pittsburgh was a success, as he totaled over 1,000 all purpose yards on offense and special teams. As a result, he was named to the NFL 1954 Pro Bowl as a kick and punt returner.

Lattner coached for a period in the late 1950s, at St. Joseph's High School in Kenosha, Wisconsin and the University of Denver. His coaching career ended in 1961 when Denver cut its football program.

Lattner was elected to the College Football Hall of Fame in 1979.

== Personal life ==
An Oak Park, Illinois, resident for most of his life, Lattner later lived in Melrose Park, Illinois and resided in Anna Maria Island, Florida during the winter months. He served as vice president of sales at PAL Graphics Inc. in Broadview, Illinois.

Of Irish Catholic descent, Lattner was a longtime participant in the Chicago Saint Patrick's Day Parade, often carrying the banner of Saint Patrick. The Chicago Tribune noted that nobody "out-Irished" Lattner, who also sports a kilt and green stockings for the festivities.

In 1962, Lattner opened Johnny Lattner's Steakhouse on Madison Street in Chicago. An electrical fire in 1968 severely damaged the restaurant and claimed three lives. Lattner's Heisman Trophy was on display in the restaurant and was destroyed in the fire. Lattner sent the Downtown Athletic Club a check for $300 along with newspaper coverage of the fire and received a replacement. He then operated a second restaurant at Marina City from 1968 to 1972.

A fire four years earlier had ended better for Lattner. While driving home from work in the early morning of November 17, 1963, he spotted a fire in an apartment building on the West Side of Chicago. He called the fire department, then roused 25 residents from one of the buildings and carried a five-year-old girl to safety. He was credited with helping 40 people escape injury.

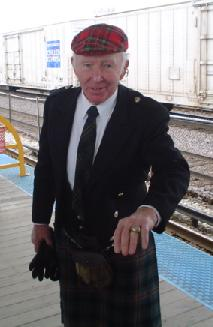
Lattner in Oak Park, Illinois in 2004

In 1986, Lattner ran in the election to be a member of the Cook County Board of Commissioners from suburban Cook County. While successful in winning the primary to be one of the Democratic Party's nominees, he failed to win election in the general election.

Lattner routinely rented out or loaned his Heisman Trophy to exhibitions, tailgates, and other events, often with the proceeds donated to charity. At halftime during Fenwick's 2007 game versus Hubbard at Soldier Field, Lattner's #34 jersey was retired.

Lattner had 25 grandchildren, several of whom have also played football for Fenwick High School. Robert Spillane, a class of 2014 graduate, played football at the linebacker position for Western Michigan University, and has played in the NFL for the Tennessee Titans, the Pittsburgh Steelers, the Las Vegas Raiders, and currently with the New England Patriots. Another grandson, Ryan Smith, also graduated from Fenwick in 2014, played football at the tight end position for Miami University, and was an off-season member of the Green Bay Packers in 2018.

Lattner was 83 when he died from mesothelioma in his Melrose Park, Illinois home on February 12, 2016.

== Electoral history ==
1986 Cook County Board of Commissioners suburban Cook County Democratic primary
Party	Candidate	Votes	%
Democratic	Joan P. Murphy	75,981	13.85
Democratic	Janice D. "Jan" Schakowsky	72,315	13.18
Democratic	Kevin J. Conlon	71,012	12.94
Democratic	John D. Rita	70,835	12.91
Democratic	Andrew "Andy" Przybylo	67,167	12.24
Democratic	Renee H. Thaler	67,072	12.22
Democratic	John J. Lattner	62,287	11.35
Democratic	Edward J. King	62,015	11.30

1986 Cook County Board of Commissioners suburban Cook County election
Party	Candidate	Votes	%
Republican	Mary M. McDonald (incumbent)	339,214	9.08
Republican	Joseph D. Mathewson	336,097	9.00
Republican	Harold L. Tyrrell (incumbent)	317,481	8.50
Republican	Carl R. Hansen (incumbent)	314,145	8.41
Republican	Richard A. Siebel (incumbent)	310,800	8.32
Republican	Joseph I. Woods (incumbent)	303,068	8.11
Republican	Robert P. Gooley	269,438	7.21
Democratic	Joan P. Murphy	262,699	7.03
Democratic	Janice D. "Jan" Schakowsky	239,517	6.41
Democratic	John J. Lattner	229,352	6.14
Democratic	Kevin J. Conlon	216,394	5.79
Democratic	Andrew "Andy" Przybylo	209,503	5.61
Democratic	John D. Rita	198,403	5.31
Democratic	Renee H. Thaler	189,344	5.07
