= Neil Worden =

American gridiron football player (born 1931)

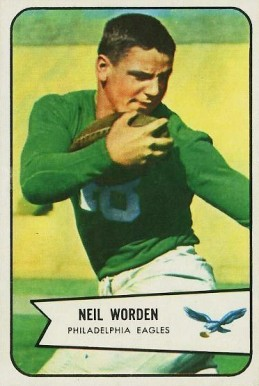
- Worden on a 1954 Bowman football card

No. 32, 91
- Position: Fullback

Personal information
- Born: August 1, 1931 (age 95); Milwaukee, Wisconsin, U.S.
- Listed height: 5 ft 10 in (1.78 m)
- Listed weight: 198 lb (90 kg)

Career information
- High school: Pulaski (WI)
- College: Notre Dame
- NFL draft: 1954: 1st round, 9th overall pick

Career history
- Philadelphia Eagles (1954, 1957); Saskatchewan Roughriders (1959)

Awards and highlights
- Third-team All-American (1953)

Career NFL statistics
- Rushing yards: 261
- Rushing average: 2.6
- Receptions: 8
- Receiving yards: 66
- Total touchdowns: 1
- Stats at Pro Football Reference

Neil James Worden (born August 1, 1931) is an American former professional football player who was a fullback for the Philadelphia Eagles of the National Football League (NFL). Selected ninth overall in the first round by the Eagles in the 1954 NFL draft, he played in the 1954 and 1957 seasons. He also played five games for the Saskatchewan Roughriders of the Canadian Football League in 1959. He played college football for the Notre Dame Fighting Irish.

== College career ==
Worden played fullback at Notre Dame University from 1950 to 1953 under Fighting Irish head coach Frank Leahy. His senior year, the 1953 Notre Dame team finished the season 9-0-1 and was runner-up to the national championship. Worden finished his Notre Dame rushing career with 476 attempts for 2039 yards and 29 touchdowns.
