= Frank Leahy =

American college football coach (1908–1973)

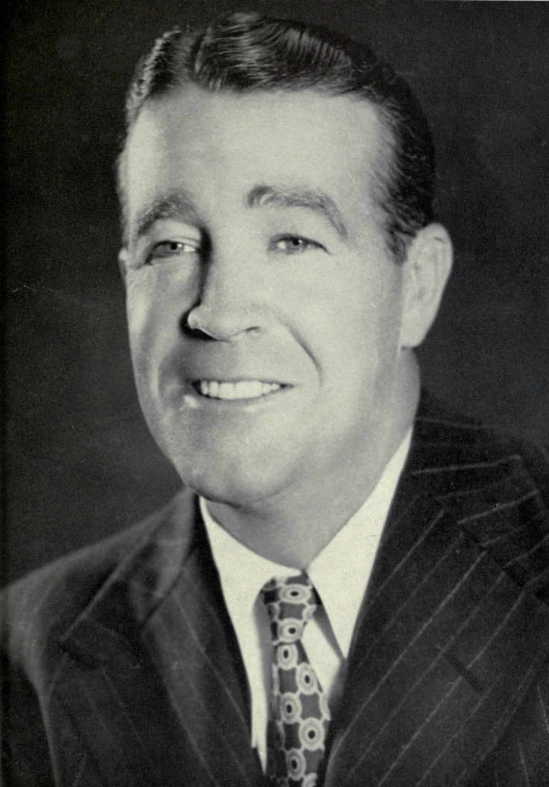
- Leahy from The 1949 Dome

Biographical details
- Born: August 27, 1908; O'Neill, Nebraska, U.S.
- Died: June 21, 1973 (aged 64); Portland, Oregon, U.S.

Playing career
- 1928–1930: Notre Dame
- Position: Tackle

Coaching career (HC unless noted)
- 1931: Georgetown (line)
- 1932: Michigan State (line)
- 1933–1938: Fordham (line)
- 1939–1940: Boston College
- 1941–1943: Notre Dame
- 1946–1953: Notre Dame

Administrative career (AD unless noted)
- 1947–1949: Notre Dame
- 1960: Los Angeles Chargers (GM)

Head coaching record
- Overall: 107–13–9
- Bowls: 1–1

Accomplishments and honors

Championships
- 4 national (1943, 1946–1947, 1949)

Awards
- AFCA Coach of the Year (1941)
- College Football Hall of Fame; Inducted in 1970 (profile)

Francis William Leahy (August 27, 1908 – June 21, 1973) was an American college football player and coach, college athletics administrator, and professional sports executive. He served as the head football coach at Boston College from 1939 to 1940 and at the University of Notre Dame from 1941 to 1943 and again from 1946 to 1953, compiling a career college football record of 107–13–9. His winning percentage of .864 is the second best in NCAA Division I football history, trailing only that of fellow Notre Dame Fighting Irish coach Knute Rockne, for whom Leahy played from 1928 to 1930. Leahy played on two Notre Dame teams that won national championships, in 1929 and 1930, and coached four more, in 1943, 1946, 1947, and 1949. Leahy was also the athletic director at Notre Dame from 1947 until 1949 when he passed the role to the Fighting Irish basketball coach Moose Krause so that he could focus on football coaching. Leahy served as the general manager for the Los Angeles Chargers of the American Football League (AFL) during their inaugural season in 1960. He was inducted into the College Football Hall of Fame as a coach in 1970.

== Early life and playing career ==
Leahy was born in O'Neill, Nebraska and graduated from Winner High School in Winner, South Dakota where he was a football standout. He attended the University of Notre Dame, where he played football as a tackle on Knute Rockne's last three teams (1928–1930) and was part of the 1929 and 1930 National champion teams. Leahy graduated from the university in 1931.

== Coaching career ==
=== Assistant coaching ===
Leahy went to Georgetown University as line coach in 1931 and Michigan State the following year to take a similar position. Leahy took over as line coach at Fordham University in 1933 and stayed until 1938 under Jim Crowley, coaching the famed Seven Blocks of Granite from 1935 to 1937 when the Rams lost only two games in three seasons. The undersized right guard on the 1935 and 1936 teams was future coaching legend Vince Lombardi.

=== Boston College ===
In 1939, Leahy went to Boston College as head coach, guiding the Eagles to a 20–2 record including an undefeated 1940 season capped off with a win in the 1941 Sugar Bowl. At Boston College, he tried relentlessly to recruit future beat author Jack Kerouac.

Although he had recently signed a contract renewal at Boston College, Leahy accepted the head coaching position at his alma mater Notre Dame. He tried without success to get out of his BC contract. He pleaded with the school's vice president. When that did not work, he went to the mayor of Boston and the governor of Massachusetts. Then, at a press conference, he told 50 reporters what the South Bend Tribune called "the biggest lie of his life". Leahy stated: "Gentlemen I've called you all here today to inform you that I recently received my release from my coaching contract. With the release went the good wishes and benediction of Boston College." Leahy stepped away, and the buzzing group of reporters battled for phone lines. A phone call came in for Leahy, and he took it. The vice president of Boston College was on the line. "Coach Leahy," he barked. "You may go wherever you want, and whenever you want. Good-bye."

=== Notre Dame ===
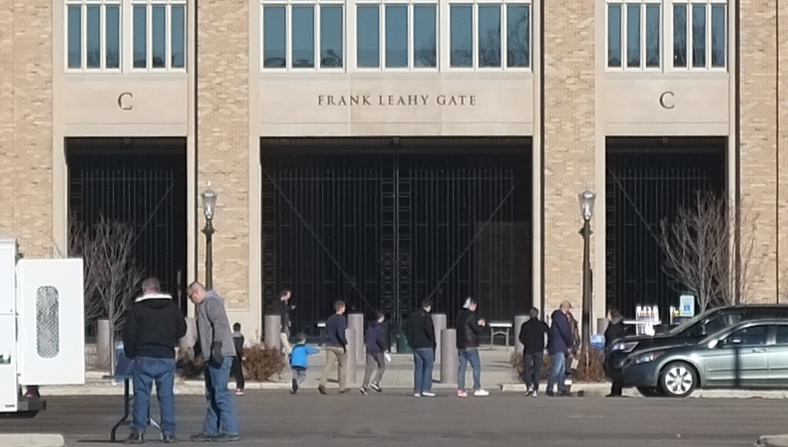
Gate at Notre Dame Stadium named for Leahy

Leahy's tenure as head coach at his alma mater began the next season. His impact was felt right away as the Irish posted an 8–0–1 mark in 1941. The following season, he caused an uproar when he abandoned Rockne's box formation and installed the T. After a 7–2–2 season in 1942, Leahy led Notre Dame to a national championship in 1943 despite losing the season finale against Great Lakes Navy by a score of 19–14. He entered the Navy in 1944 and was discharged as a lieutenant. He returned to Notre Dame for the 1946 season in which Notre Dame shared the national championship after playing rival Earl Blaik's Army team to a scoreless tie at Yankee Stadium in New York. National championships followed in 1947 and 1949, with only a 14–14 tie against USC in the season finale marring a perfect season in 1948 and another possible national title. It was regarded by many as the most successful run in Notre Dame history and Leahy appeared to be well on his way of meeting his goal of ten consecutive seasons without a loss. Then with most of the wartime talent gone from the scene, the Irish fell to 4–4–1 in 1950. Scholarships had been reduced from 33 to 18 per year in 1948 when other teams, tired of getting beaten year in and year out, began dropping Notre Dame from their schedules. Consequently, the talent level had dropped off drastically. Leahy is one of only two coaches in college football history to have won multiple national championships at the same school during two different tenures, joining Tennessee's Robert Neyland.

Scholarships were increased afterwards, and the situation improved. Aided by freshman eligibility brought on by the Korean War, Notre Dame finished 7–2–1 in 1951 and 1952 while the 1953 squad, Leahy's last, posted a 9–0–1 docket. A controversial 14–14 tie against Iowa denied the Irish another consensus national championship, although ten other selectors chose the Irish for the title. However, Notre Dame does not recognize this national championship. The controversy over the tie with Iowa stemmed from the fact that both of Notre Dame's touchdowns, one late in the first half and the other late in the game, came after a player had faked an injury. In both instances, Notre Dame had used up their allotment of time outs, and under normal circumstances, time would have expired in each half before they could run another play. Faking an injury was a widely used ploy in football as a means of buying time, but in most cases there was no impact on the outcome of a game. In Notre Dame's case, the Irish used this ruse not once but twice in the same game, and both times they managed to score touchdowns. A new rule was implemented the following year forbidding players from faking injuries, and many saw this as punishment directed at Notre Dame, who were branded as the "Fainting Irish."

There was some concern about Leahy's health when he collapsed from a pancreatic attack in the locker room during halftime of the 1953 Georgia Tech game. A priest allegedly gave Leahy the last rites of the Catholic Church when it was feared he was dying. Leahy resigned on January 31, 1954, with two years remaining on his contract. Supposedly he had been ordered to give up coaching by his doctors for the sake of his health, but he later revealed that he left because he felt he was no longer wanted. Leahy was succeeded by Terry Brennan, ushering in a downward slide for Notre Dame's football fortunes for the next decade.

While at Notre Dame, Leahy had six undefeated seasons, four national championship teams, and an unbeaten string of 39 games (37–0–2) in the late 1940s. He also coached four Heisman Trophy winners—Angelo Bertelli (1943), Johnny Lujack (1947), Leon Hart (1949) and Johnny Lattner (1953)—and recruited a fifth, 1956 winner, Paul Hornung. His overall record at Notre Dame was 87–11–9. Like his former coach Rockne, Leahy believed that games were won in practice, and he had the reputation of being a relentless taskmaster. It is said that Leahy's teams never had a practice without hitting and that his quarterbacks would catch snaps every practice until their hands bled. His teams were always well conditioned and Leahy was merciless when it came to the toughness of his players. In addition to his practices, Leahy coached a tough-nosed style of football during the games. Leahy's teams rarely kicked field goals when they were on the goal line because "Notre Dame didn't kick field goals, Notre Dame was too tough to kick field goals." This philosophy backfired against Army in 1946, when the Irish drove all the way to the Cadets' 4-yard line and turned the ball over on downs. A field goal would have won the game. Leahy always referred to his players as his "lads."

In 1949, he wrote a book on the T-formation, Notre Dame Football: The "T" Formation.

== Television ==
Leahy was host of The Frank Leahy Show on ABC television from September 27, 1953, to December 6, 1953. He interviewed the coach of Notre Dame's opponent on the preceding day. The program preceded a broadcast of highlights of the game.

== Later life ==
Leahy served as general manager for the Los Angeles Chargers during their inaugural 1960 season in the American Football League. He was selected to the National Football Foundation Hall of Fame in 1970. Leahy moved to the Portland, Oregon, suburb of Lake Oswego in 1963, where he worked as an executive in a vending machine company until his death from congestive heart failure in Portland in 1973. Leahy was married to the former Florence Reilly in 1935; she survived him in death. They had eight children. Their son Jim and grandson Ryan played football at Notre Dame.

For his contribution to sports in Los Angeles, he was honored with a Los Angeles Memorial Coliseum "Court of Honor" plaque by the Coliseum commissioners.

== Head coaching record ==
Year	Team	Overall	Conference	Standing	Bowl/playoffs	Coaches^{#}	AP^{°}
Boston College Eagles (Independent) (1939–1940)
1939	Boston College	9–2			L Cotton		
1940	Boston College	11–0			W Sugar		5
Boston College:		20–2					
Notre Dame Fighting Irish (Independent) (1941–1943)
1941	Notre Dame	8–0–1					3
1942	Notre Dame	7–2–2					6
1943	Notre Dame	9–1					1
Notre Dame Fighting Irish (Independent) (1946–1953)
1946	Notre Dame	8–0–1					1
1947	Notre Dame	9–0					1
1948	Notre Dame	9–0–1					2
1949	Notre Dame	10–0					1
1950	Notre Dame	4–4–1					
1951	Notre Dame	7–2–1				13	
1952	Notre Dame	7–2–1				3	3
1953	Notre Dame	9–0–1				2	2
Notre Dame:		87–11–9					
Total:		107–13–9					
National championship Conference title Conference division title or championship game berth
^{#}Rankings from final Coaches Poll.; ^{°}Rankings from final AP Poll.

== See also ==
- List of college football career coaching winning percentage leaders
- List of college football head coaches with non-consecutive tenure
