= 1991 Orange Bowl =

1991 Federal Express Orange Bowl
- 57th Orange Bowl
- The Miami Orange Bowl in Miami, Florida, hosted the Orange Bowl.
Notre Dame Fighting Irish	Colorado Buffaloes
(9–2)	(10–1–1)
Independent	Big Eight
9	10
Head coach: Lou Holtz	Head coach: Bill McCartney
AP / Coaches; 5 / 6	AP / Coaches; 1 / 1
	1	2	3	4	Total
Notre Dame	0	6	3	0	9
Colorado	0	3	7	0	10
- Date: January 1, 1991
- Season: 1990
- Stadium: Orange Bowl
- Location: Miami, Florida
- MVP: Charles Johnson (Note: Two players named Charles Johnson played in the 1991 Orange Bowl for Colorado. One of these, the backup quarterback who was named co-MVP, is mentioned in this article. However, this player never played in the NFL and has no Wikipedia page because he is deemed non-notable. The other Charles Johnson, who was a wide receiver in the 1991 Orange Bowl but is not mentioned in this article, is deemed notable because of his later NFL career and has his own Wikipedia page.) (CU QB); Chris Zorich (Notre Dame NG)
- Favorite: Pick
- Referee: Frank Shepard (SWC)
- Attendance: 77,062

United States TV coverage
- Network: NBC
- Announcers: Dick Enberg (Play by Play); Bill Walsh (Color); O.J. Simpson and Bob Trumpy (Sideline)

The 1991 Orange Bowl was the 57th edition of the college football bowl game, played at the Orange Bowl in Miami, Florida, on Tuesday, January 1. Part of the 1990–91 bowl game season, it matched the independent and fifth-ranked Notre Dame Fighting Irish and the #1 Colorado Buffaloes of the Big Eight Conference.

It was a rematch of the previous year, in which #4 Notre Dame defeated #1 Colorado, 21–6. This time, Colorado won by a point, 10–9, and won a share of the national championship.

== Teams ==
=== Notre Dame ===
The Fighting Irish were 9–2; both losses occurred when they were first in the polls, and at home. The first was a 36–31 loss to 1–3 Stanford on October 6. The second was to Penn State on November 17, as Craig Fayak kicked a 34-yard field goal to hand the Irish a 24–21 loss, which resulted in Notre Dame's No. 1 ranking falling to Colorado. Sophomore quarterback Rick Mirer passed for 1,824 yards and eight touchdowns, while Raghib Ismail accounted for 1,726 all-purpose yards, putting him on the All-American team as a wide receiver.

=== Colorado ===
Colorado compiled a 10–1–1 record in the regular season. In the opener at the Pigskin Classic in Anaheim, California, #8 Tennessee rallied from 21 points down and chose to kick an extra point for a 31–31 tie with less than three minutes remaining, and there was no additional scoring. More than a month later, Colorado quarterback Charles Johnson scored a touchdown to beat Missouri 33–31, in a very controversial game in which Colorado was mistakenly given an extra down. The winning touchdown was scored on that play, and it was allowed to stand. That game is often referred to as the "5th down game." One reason for the Buffaloes No. 1 ranking was that they had the toughest schedule of any team. Another was quarterback Darian Hagan and half back Eric Bieniemy, who finished third in the Heisman Trophy voting. A victory seemed likely guarantee at least a share of the championship, but the Georgia Tech Yellow Jackets weren't far behind, second in both polls, and won the Citrus Bowl 45–21 over Nebraska earlier in the day to finish undefeated at 11–0–1.

== Game summary ==
After a scoreless first quarter, Colorado's Jim Harper kicked a 22-yard field goal for the game's first points. A few minutes later, on 2nd and goal, tailback Ricky Watters plunged in from two yards to give the Fighting Irish the lead. But when Ronnie Bradford blocked Craig Hentrich's PAT attempt, the score remained 6–3. This cost Hentrich his 73 straight successful PAT attempts, a school record. Things would turn sour for the Buffaloes, however, as Hagan ruptured his tendon in his left knee just before the half, where the score remained the same.

This bowl is also remembered for a controversial finish. Ismail returned a punt 92 yards for a likely game-winning touchdown with 43 seconds left. This could have sealed the victory for Notre Dame and cost Colorado a share of the national championship. However, the touchdown was called back on a dubious clipping penalty, and Colorado held on for the 10–9 victory.

=== Scoring ===
First quarter
No scoring
Second quarter

- Colorado – Jim Harper 22-yard field goal
- Notre Dame – Ricky Watters 2-yard run (kick blocked)

Third quarter

- Notre Dame – Craig Hentrich 24-yard field goal
- Colorado – Eric Bieniemy 1-yard run (Harper kick)

Fourth quarter
No scoring

== Statistics ==
Statistics	Notre Dame	Colorado
First downs	18	19
Rushes–yards	36–123	54–186
Passing yards	141	109
Passes (C–A–I)	13–31–3	9–19–0
Total offense	67–265	73–295
Return yards	68	50
Punts–average	3–51	7–40
Fumbles–lost	2–2	2–1
Turnovers	5	1
Penalties–yards	3–45	6–50
Time of possession	24:24	35:36

== Aftermath ==
The win gave the Buffaloes their first and (to date) only national championship, shared with Georgia Tech. Notre Dame fell one spot to sixth in the final AP poll.
