= 1989 Colorado Buffaloes football team =

American college football season

1989 Colorado Buffaloes football

Big 8 champion

Orange Bowl, L 6–21 vs. Notre Dame
- Conference: Big Eight Conference

Ranking
- Coaches: No. 4
- AP: No. 4
- Record: 11–1 (7–0 Big 8)
- Head coach: Bill McCartney (8th season)
- Offensive coordinator: Gerry DiNardo (6th season)
- Offensive scheme: I-Bone option
- Defensive coordinator: Mike Hankwitz (2nd season)
- Base defense: 5–2
- MVP: Darian Hagan
- Captains: Sal Aunese (honorary); Bill Coleman; Mike Jones; Erich Kissick; Bruce Young
- Home stadium: Folsom Field

1989 Big Eight Conference football standings
	Conf.					Overall
Team	W		L		T	W		L		T
No. 4 Colorado $	7	–	0	–	0	11	–	1	–	0
No. 11 Nebraska	6	–	1	–	0	10	–	2	–	0
Oklahoma	5	–	2	–	0	7	–	4	–	0
Iowa State	4	–	3	–	0	6	–	5	–	0
Oklahoma State	3	–	4	–	0	4	–	7	–	0
Kansas	2	–	5	–	0	4	–	7	–	0
Missouri	1	–	6	–	0	2	–	9	–	0
Kansas State	0	–	7	–	0	1	–	10	–	0
$ – Conference champion; Rankings from AP Poll

The 1989 Colorado Buffaloes football team represented the University of Colorado at Boulder in the Big Eight Conference during the 1989 NCAA Division I-A football season. Colorado finished with the most wins in school history, surpassing the 1971 team, and their first conference championship in thirteen years. The Buffaloes went undefeated in the regular season at 11–0 (7–0 in Big 8) and played for the national title, but lost to fourth-ranked Notre Dame in the Orange Bowl.

The team dedicated the season to senior and former starting quarterback Sal Aunese, who was diagnosed with stomach cancer in late March, and died at age 21 on September 23 due to complications from the disease.

For the first time in 28 years, Colorado defeated Oklahoma and Nebraska in the same season. In the 27 seasons in between, they had five wins over Oklahoma (1965, 1966, 1968, 1972, 1976) and two over Nebraska (1967, 1986).

In another feel-good story, the team was host to a Make A Wish recipient Chad Henry for the big game against Nebraska in Boulder. Henry was an up-and-coming high school football player from Indiana, Pennsylvania, and the son of college/NFL coach Jack Henry, who began following the Buffaloes after reading about Sal Aunese's battle with cancer while himself battling a very rare and dangerous form of abdominal cancer. After cheering on the Buffs to the biggest win in school history in early November, Henry and his family were also invited to attend the national championship game in Miami as guests of the university. He went on to defeat the disease and did play football for his high school again in 1990. Although his once promising football career was ended following that season due to complications with side effects from the intense chemotherapy he endured, Henry went on to coach football at his high school and became a scout for the NFL's Detroit Lions and is currently with the Indianapolis Colts.

== Schedule ==
Date	Time	Opponent	Rank	Site	TV	Result	Attendance	Source
September 4	5:30 pm	Texas*	No. 14	Folsom Field; Boulder, CO	ESPN	W 27–6	47,269	
September 9	1:30 pm	Colorado State*	No. 9	Folsom Field; Boulder, CO (rivalry)	KCNC	W 45–20	44,921	
September 16	1:30 pm	No. 10 Illinois*	No. 8	Folsom Field; Boulder, CO	CBS	W 38–7	46,747	
September 30	2:00 pm	at No. 21 Washington*	No. 5	Husky Stadium; Seattle, WA	KCNC	W 45–28	69,152	
October 7	1:30 pm	Missouri	No. 3	Folsom Field; Boulder, CO		W 49–3	51,855	
October 14	1:00 pm	at Iowa State	No. 3	Cyclone Stadium; Ames, IA	KCNC	W 52–17	41,515	
October 21	1:30 pm	Kansas^{†}	No. 3	Folsom Field; Boulder, CO		W 49–17	50,057	
October 28	12:30 pm	at Oklahoma	No. 3	Oklahoma Memorial Stadium; Norman, OK	KWGN	W 20–3	75,004	
November 4	12:30 pm	No. 3 Nebraska	No. 2	Folsom Field; Boulder, CO (rivalry)	CBS	W 27–21	52,877	
November 11	12:30 pm	at Oklahoma State	No. 2	Lewis Field; Stillwater, OK	KCNC	W 41–17	41,500	
November 18	11:10 am	at Kansas State	No. 2	KSU Stadium; Manhattan, KS (rivalry)	KCNC	W 59–11	20,117	
January 1, 1990	6:00 pm	vs. No. 4 Notre Dame*	No. 1	Orange Bowl; Miami, FL (Orange Bowl)	NBC	L 6–21	81,191	
*Non-conference game; ^{†}Homecoming; Rankings from AP Poll released prior to the game; All times are in Mountain time

== Rankings ==
Ranking movements Legend: ██ Increase in ranking ██ Decrease in ranking — = Not ranked ( ) = First-place votes
	Week																
Poll	Pre	1	2	3	4	5	6	7	8	9	10	11	12	13	14	15	Final
AP	14	9	8	6	5	3	3 (2)	3 (3)	3 (1)	2 (2)	2 (4)	2 (3)	2 (3)	1 (53)	1 (55)	1 (51)	4
Coaches	14	11	7	5	5	4	4 (1)	3 (1)	3 (1)	2 (2)	2 (5)	2 (4)	2 (4)	1 (39)	1 (42)	—	4

== Game summaries ==
=== At Oklahoma ===
#3 Colorado Buffaloes (6–0) at Oklahoma Sooners (5–1)

Quarter	1	2	3	4	Total
Colorado	0	10	0	10	20
Oklahoma	0	0	0	3	3

at Oklahoma Memorial Stadium, Norman, Oklahoma

- Date: October 28
- Game attendance: 75,004
- TV: KWGN
- Box Score

Game information

First quarter

- No scoring

Second quarter

- CU – Ken Culbertson 30-yard field goal. Colorado 3–0. Drive: 11 plays, 50 yards.
- CU – J.J. Flannigan 1-yard run (Ken Culbertson kick). Colorado 10–0.

Third quarter

- No scoring

Fourth quarter

- OU – R.D. Lashar 33-yard field goal. Colorado 10–3.
- CU – Ken Culbertson 27-yard field goal, 9:49. Colorado 13–3. Drive: 9 plays.
- CU – Darian Hagan 8-yard run (Ken Culbertson kick). Colorado 20–3.

Top rushers

- CU –Darian Hagan – 21 rushes, 107 yards, TD

- Colorado 8-0 for first time since 1927
- Culbertson's field goal in second quarter gave Colorado its first lead over Oklahoma in a game since 1976
- Colorado's first win in Norman since 1965
- J.J. Flannigan 25 rushes, 103 yards
- Arthur Walker 8 tackles, sack (Big 8 Defensive Player of Week)

=== Nebraska ===
#3 Nebraska at #2 Colorado

Team	1	2	3	4	Total
Cornhuskers	7	7	7	0	21
• Buffaloes	14	3	7	3	27

- Date: November 4
- Location: Folsom Field, Boulder, Colorado
- Game attendance: 52,877
- TV announcers (CBS): Jim Nantz and Pat Haden

Scoring summary
1	13:30	NEB	Bryan Carpenter 51 yard pass from Gerry Gdowski (Gregg Barrios kick)	NEB 7–0
1	8:22	COL	J.J. Flannigan 70 yard run (Ken Culbertson kick)	Tie 7–7
1	5:04	COL	Darian Hagan 1 yard run (Ken Culbertson kick)	COL 14–7
2	11:33	NEB	Morgan Gregory 12 yard pass from Gerry Gdowski (Gregg Barrios kick)	Tie 14–14
2	0:12	COL	Ken Culbertson 49 yard field goal	COL 17–14
3	8:00	COL	J.J. Flannigan 2 yard run (Ken Culbertson kick)	COL 24–14
3	1:04	NEB	Chris Garrett 26 yard pass from Gerry Gdowski (Gregg Barrios kick)	COL 24–21
4	8:47	COL	Ken Culbertson 28 yard field goal	COL 27–21

Colorado honored their All-Century team at halftime

=== Orange Bowl (vs. Notre Dame) ===
#1 Colorado Buffaloes (11–0) vs. #4 Notre Dame Fighting Irish (11–1)

Quarter	1	2	3	4	Total
Notre Dame	0	0	14	7	21
Colorado	0	0	6	0	6

at Orange Bowl, Miami, Florida

- Date: January 1, 1990
- Game attendance: 81,190
- TV announcers (NBC): Dick Enberg and Bill Walsh
- Recap/Box

Game information

First quarter

- No scoring

Second quarter

- No scoring

Third quarter

- ND – Anthony Johnson 2-yard run (Craig Hentrich kick), 11:48. Notre Dame 7–0.
- ND – Raghib Ismail 35-yard run (Craig Hentrich kick), 7:19. Notre Dame 14–0.
- CU – Darian Hagan 39-yard run (kick failed), 0:01. Notre Dame 14–6.

Fourth quarter

- ND – Anthony Johnson 7-yard run (Craig Hentrich kick), 1:32. Notre Dame 21–6.

Top passers

- ND – Tony Rice – 5/9, 99 yards
- CU – Darian Hagan – 4/13, 65 yards

Top rushers

- ND – Anthony Johnson – 15 rushes, 89 yards, 2 TD
- CU – Eric Bieniemy – 11 rushes, 66 yards

Top receivers

- ND – Pat Eilers – 2 receptions, 47 yards
- CU – Eric Kissick – 2 receptions, 33 yards

== Personnel ==
1989 Colorado Buffaloes football team roster
Players
Coaches
Offense

Pos.	#	Name	Class
RB		Matt Bell
RB	1	Eric Bieniemy	Jr
TE		Jon Boman
WR	84	Jeff Campbell	Sr
OT	77	Bill Coleman (C)
RB		Dennis Collier
RB		Scott DeGoler
RB		J.J. Flannigan
G	62	Joe Garten	Jr
QB	3	Darian Hagan	So
FB		George Hemingway
WR		Mark Henry
QB		Charles S. Johnson
FB		Eric Kissick (C)
C	52	Jay Leeuwenberg	So
G		Darren Muilenberg
WR		M.J. Nelson
RB		O.C. Oliver
TE		John Perak
WR	9	Mike Pritchard	Jr
RB		Tony Senna
RB		Michael Simmons
OT	72	Mark VanderPoel	Jr
QB		Mark Walters

Defense

Pos.	#	Name	Class
OLB		Chad Brown
CB		David Gibbs
DL		Gary Howe
S		Tim James
ILB		Terry Johnson
ILB	59	Michael Jones (C)
CB	12	Dave McCloughan	Jr
DE	96	Kanavis McGhee	Jr
DT		Okland Salavea
NG	93	Joel Steed	So
DT		Arthur Walker	Sr
OLB	94	Alfred Williams
S		Bruce Young (C)

Special teams

Pos.	#	Name	Class
K		Ken Culbertson
P		Tom Rouen

Head coach

- Bill McCartney (8th year)

Coordinators/assistant coaches

- Gary Barnett
- Mike Barry
- Gerry DiNardo (OC)
- Don Frease
- Mike Hankwitz (DC)
- Oliver Lucas
- Bob Simmons
- Ron Vanderlinden
- Zaven Yaralian

Legend

- (C) Team captain
- (S) Suspended
- (I) Ineligible
- Injured
- Redshirt
