= Marcellas Dial =

American football player (born 2000)

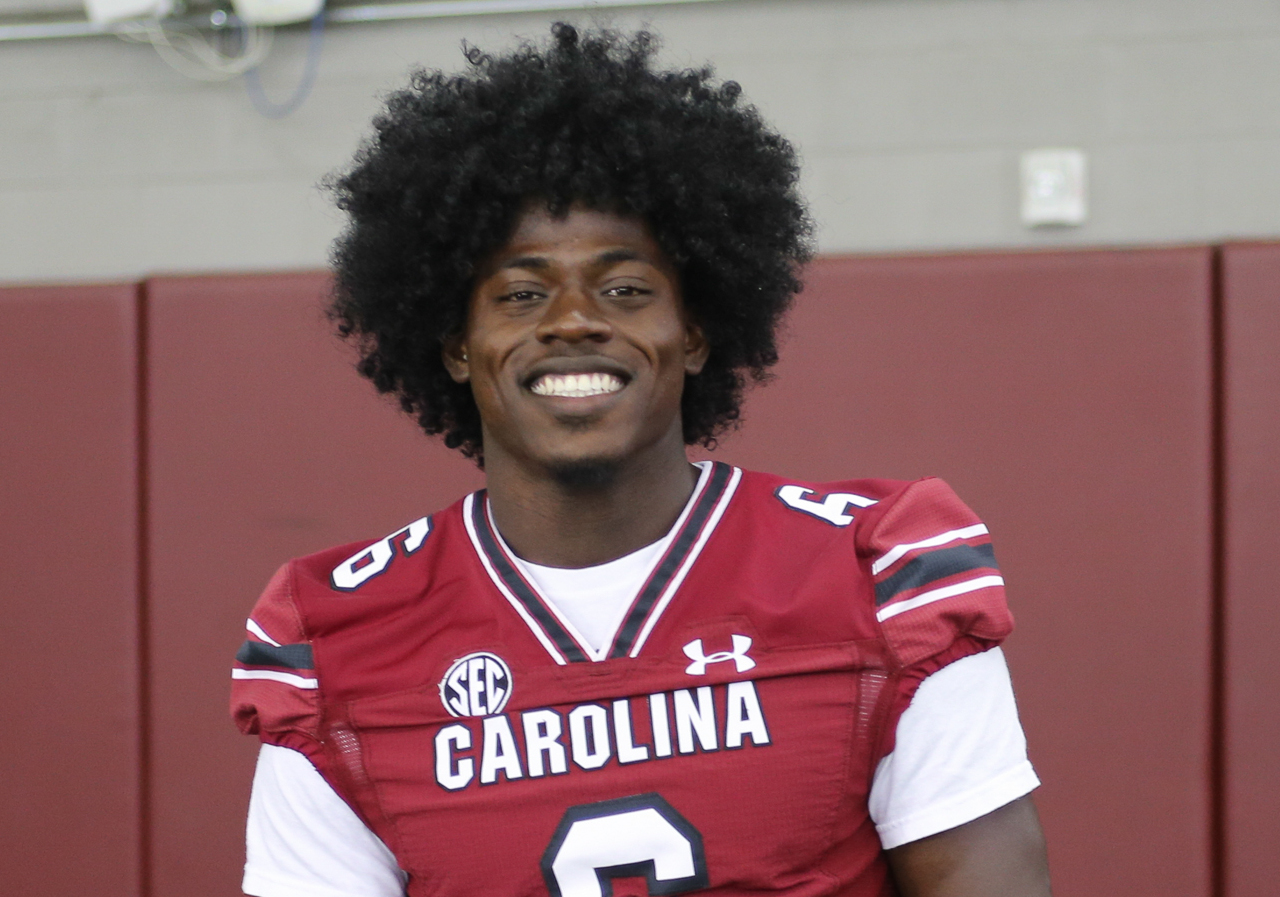
- Dial with the South Carolina Gamecocks in 2022

No. 24 – Miami Dolphins
- Position: Cornerback
- Roster status: Active

Personal information
- Born: December 6, 2000 (age 25); Woodruff, South Carolina, U.S.
- Listed height: 6 ft 0 in (1.83 m)
- Listed weight: 190 lb (86 kg)

Career information
- High school: Woodruff
- College: Georgia Military (2019–2020); South Carolina (2021–2023)
- NFL draft: 2024: 6th round, 180th overall pick

Career history
- New England Patriots (2024–2025); Miami Dolphins (2026–present)

Career NFL statistics as of 2025
- Total tackles: 12
- Forced fumbles: 1
- Stats at Pro Football Reference

Marcellas Rashard Dial Jr. (born December 6, 2000) is an American professional football cornerback for the Miami Dolphins of the National Football League (NFL). He played college football at Georgia Military College and for the South Carolina Gamecocks.

== Early life ==
Dial was born on December 6, 2000, and grew up in Woodruff, South Carolina. He attended Woodruff High School but received little attention to play college football, ultimately signing with Georgia Military College.

== College career ==
As a freshman at Georgia Military in 2019, Dial totaled 10 tackles, one fumble recovery and an interception. The 2020 season was canceled due to the COVID-19 pandemic, and Dial transferred to the South Carolina Gamecocks for the 2021 season. He had been ranked by 247Sports as the 51st-best junior college recruit nationally and the seventh-best cornerback.

In his first year at South Carolina, Dial became a starter and appeared in 13 games, starting seven while posting 33 tackles, six pass deflections and a forced fumble. In 2022, he played 13 games, starting 10, and had 45 tackles while leading the team with 12 pass breakups and three interceptions. He returned for a final season in 2023 and had 36 tackles and 10 pass breakups. Dial was invited to participate at the 2024 NFL Scouting Combine.

== Professional career ==
Pre-draft measurables
Height	Weight	Arm length	Hand span	Wingspan	40-yard dash	10-yard split	20-yard split	20-yard shuttle	Three-cone drill	Vertical jump	Broad jump	Bench press
5 ft 11 3/4 in (1.82 m)	190 lb (86 kg)	32 in (0.81 m)	8 7/8 in (0.23 m)	6 ft 5 5/8 in (1.97 m)	4.46 s	1.55 s	2.61 s	4.44 s	7.29 s	40.5 in (1.03 m)	10 ft 9 in (3.28 m)	16 reps
All values from NFL Combine/Pro Day

=== New England Patriots ===
Dial was selected in the sixth round with the 180th overall pick in the 2024 NFL draft by the New England Patriots. Dial signed his rookie contract with the Patriots on May 10, 2024. He played in all 17 games with one start, recording 12 tackles and a forced fumble playing primarily on special teams.

In training camp in 2025, Dial suffered a torn ACL and was placed on injured reserve on August 5, 2025, ending his season.

On August 30, 2026, Dial was waived by the Patriots as a part of final roster cuts.

=== Miami Dolphins ===
On August 31, 2026, Dial was claimed off of waivers by the Miami Dolphins.
