= Old Woodruff High School (Woodruff, South Carolina) =

- Woodruff High School
- U.S. National Register of Historic Places
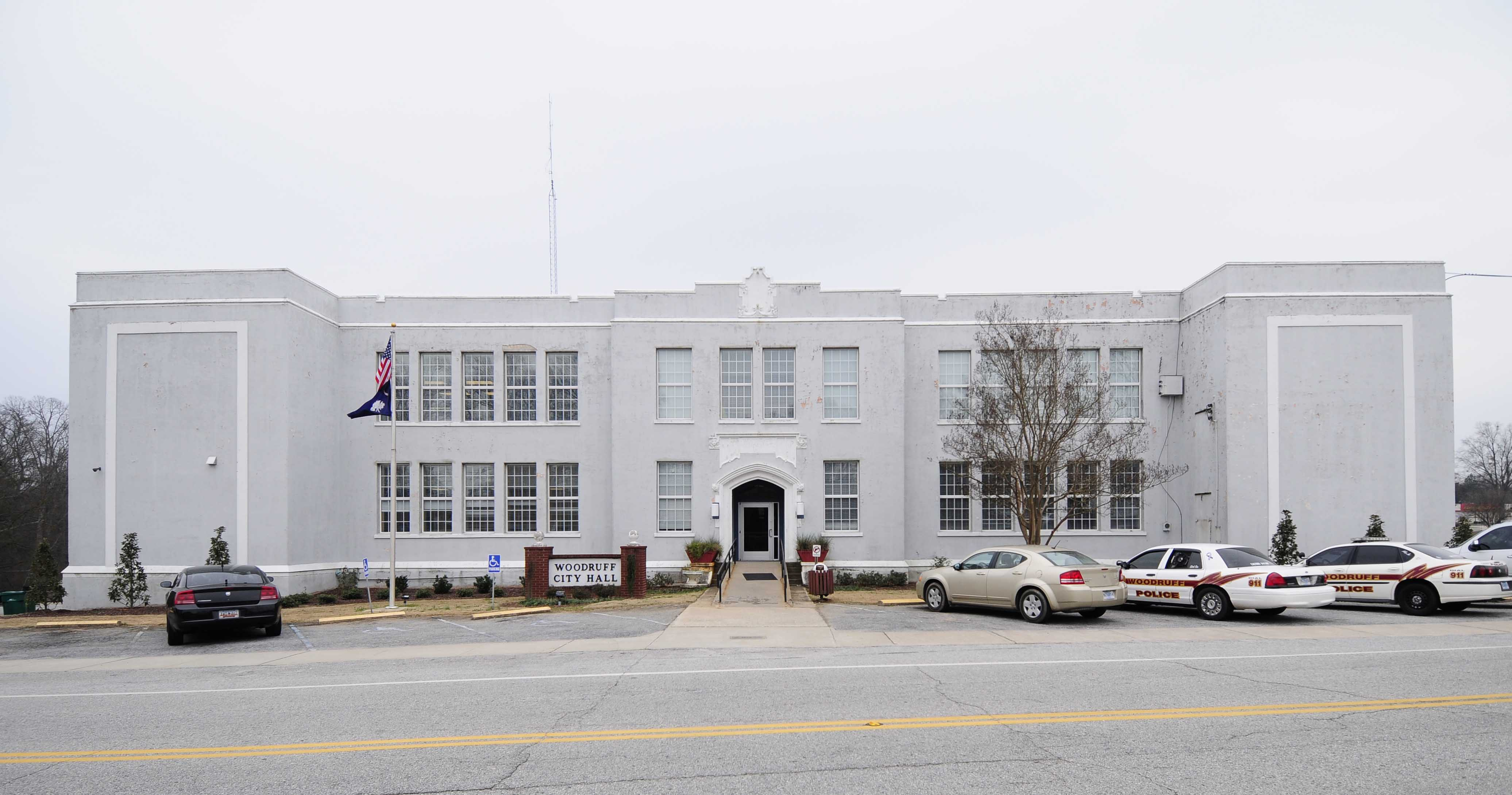
- Old Woodruff High School, February 2012

- Location within South Carolina Location within the United States
- Location: 231 E. Hayne St., Woodruff, South Carolina
- Coordinates: 34.7393°N 82.0346°W
- Area: 2.1 acres (0.85 ha)
- Built: 1925
- Architect: Frank H. Cunningham, Joseph G. Cunningham
- Architectural style: Gothic Revival
- NRHP reference No.: 06000578
- Added to NRHP: October 18, 2006

Old Woodruff High School is a historic high school building located at Woodruff, Spartanburg County, South Carolina. It was built in 1925, and is a two-story, modified "H" plan stuccoed masonry building in the Collegiate Gothic style. It consists of a three-part center section with two perpendicular wings. The building has a flat roof with parapet, Gothic arches, recessed entrances framed by pointed arches. The building housed a high school until 1953 when Woodruff High School was constructed, then used as a middle school and later an elementary school. In 1978 the City of Woodruff acquired old Woodruff High School and adapted it for use as its city hall and police headquarters.

It was listed on the National Register of Historic Places in 2006.
