= WSJW (disambiguation) =

WSJW may refer to:

- WSJW (AM), a radio station (550 AM) licensed to Pawtucket, Rhode Island, United States
- WPPY, a radio station (92.7 FM) licensed to Starview, Pennsylvania, United States, which used the call sign WSJW from March 2004 to August 2011
- WRKA, a radio station (103.9 FM) licensed to Louisville, Kentucky, United States, which used the call sign WSJW from June 1996 to May 1998
- WQUL, a radio station (1510 AM) licensed to Woodruff, South Carolina, United States, which used the call sign WSJW from July 1967 to June 1989
