= Tony Rice (gridiron football) =

American gridiron football player (born 1967)

No. 9
- Position: Quarterback

Personal information
- Born: September 5, 1967 (age 59); Woodruff, South Carolina, U.S.

Career information
- High school: Woodruff
- College: Notre Dame

Career history
- 1990: Saskatchewan Roughriders
- 1991–1992: Barcelona Dragons
- 1994: Munich Thunder

Awards and highlights
- Johnny Unitas Golden Arm Award (1989); First-team All-American (1989)

Tony Rice (born September 5, 1967) is an American former professional football player who was a quarterback in the Canadian Football League (CFL) and in Europe's World League of American Football (WLAF). Rice is perhaps best remembered as the dynamic option quarterback of the Notre Dame Fighting Irish's 1988 national championship team under coach Lou Holtz. Rice played professional football for three seasons for the CFL's Saskatchewan Roughriders and the Barcelona Dragons of the World League from 1990 to 1992. He also played for Munich Thunder in the Football League of Europe in 1994.

== Recruitment and Proposition 48 ==
While growing up in Woodruff, South Carolina, Rice played football at Woodruff High School under Coach Willie Varner. Rice entered the University of Notre Dame in 1986 as part of coach Lou Holtz's first recruiting class. Rice was of the first set of freshman recruits bound by the NCAA rules of Proposition 48, which required freshman meet numerous high school academic milestones to be eligible to play their first year. Because Rice failed to meet the required 700 on his SAT (he scored a 690), he was forced to sit out the entire 1986 season.

== College career ==
=== 1987 season ===
In 1987, Rice became the starting quarterback for Notre Dame following an injury to Terry Andrysiak. The Irish finished the season 8–4 and earned a berth to the Cotton Bowl Classic, where they lost 35–10 to 13th-ranked Texas A&M in a game where Rice played only sparingly.

Rice finished the season with over 1,000 yards of total offense and 8 total touchdowns (663 yards, 1 touchdown passing and 337 yards, 7 touchdowns rushing).

=== 1989 season ===
The Fighting Irish got to 6–0 start and they were ranked #1 in the country. The Irish faced USC at home on October 21, 1989 in what turned into sloppy play by both sides. Notre Dame overcame five turnovers to win 28–24. The Irish were down 17–7 at halftime. Rice scored on touchdown runs of 7 and 15 yards and finished with 99 yards on 18 carries. He also threw for 91 yards off 5 of 16 passing attempts.

The season resumed as Rice directed Notre Dame's offense to 310 yards rushing in their October 28, 1989 45–7 over Pittsburgh. Rice had 12 carries for 69 yards and went 1-of-7 passing for 29 yards against the Panthers.

On November 18, 1989, Notre Dame extended its record to 11–0 by defeating #17 Penn State, 34–23. Rice had a career-high 141 rushing yards and completed 5 of 10 passes for 47 yards as the Irish finished with 425 yards on the ground against the Nittany Lions. At this point, Notre Dame had a 23-game winning streak.

==== Orange Bowl ====
4th-ranked Notre Dame faced #1 Colorado (11–0) in the Orange Bowl. After a 0–0 score at halftime, the 2nd half opened with Rice directing a 69-yard drive in seven plays as fullback Anthony Johnson scored from the 2-yard line to give Notre Dame a 7–0 lead. Raghib "Rocket" Ismail, filling in at tailback for an injured Ricky Watters, scored a 36-yard touchdown run to increase Notre Dame's lead to 14–0 with 7:19 left in the third quarter. The Irish won the game, 21–6.

Rice completed 5 of 9 passes for 99 yards and rushed 14 times for 50 yards. Notre Dame completed a successful 12–1 season and was ranked #2 by the AP College Football Poll after the win over Colorado.

=== Conclusion to senior year and career at Notre Dame ===
Rice's record as a starting quarterback for the University of Notre Dame was 31–4 that included a national championship. Rice won the Johnny Unitas Golden Arm Award on December 1, 1989 and finished fourth in the 1989 Heisman Trophy the next day. He also made the 1989 College Football All-America Team as a quarterback. His regular season statistics had him completing 68-of-137 passes for 1,122 yards and two touchdowns and rushing 174 times for 884 yards and 7 touchdowns in 12 games. He had a longest run of 38 yards while his longest pass play of the season covered 52 yards.

=== Statistics ===
Year	Team	GP	Passing						Rushing			
Year	Team	GP	CMP	ATT	CMP%	YDS	TD	INT	ATT	YDS	AVG	TD
1986	Notre Dame	0	Did not play due to Prop. 48									
1987	Notre Dame	11	35	85	41.2	663	1	5	90	340	3.8	7
1988	Notre Dame	11	77	149	51.7	1,389	10	8	134	775	5.8	9
1989	Notre Dame	12	73	146	50.0	1,221	2	9	188	934	5.0	7
Totals		34	185	380	48.7	3,273	13	22	412	2,049	5.0	23

Notes – Statistics from the table include bowl game performances.

== Professional career ==
Rice was passed up by the 1990 NFL draft. He opted for the CFL after NFL teams shied away from him because of his slight, 6-foot-1 build and his success as a runner, not a passer. In June 1990, Rice was working with the Saskatchewan Roughriders during training camp as the third-string quarterback behind starter Kent Austin. The Roughriders finished 9–9 in his only season in the CFL as Rice served in mop-up duty while the starting quarterback Austin threw for 4,604 yards.

After his short stint with the Roughriders of the CFL, Rice began checking other options.

In February 1991, he was drafted in the second round by the Barcelona Dragons in Spain of the World League of American Football, which played its season in the spring beginning in March.

Rice's first season with Barcelona was very successful as the Dragons finished 9–3 and reached the championship game that was known as the World Bowl '91. Rice's Dragons fell to the London Monarchs, 21–0. He had nearly equal playing time with the team's starter, Scott Erney, as Rice went 69-of-129 passing for 915 yards with 1 touchdown and 3 interceptions for the season. He had 33 rushes for 210 yards and 2 touchdowns in his first year with the new football league.

The next season was not as prosperous for Barcelona as the team finished at 5–6. The Sacramento Surge knocked them out of the playoffs, 17–15, on May 31, 1992. As the backup quarterback, Rice was 22-of-57 passing for 313 yards and had 102 yards rushing and a touchdown for the 1992 season.

The World League of American Football ceased its operations following the 1992 season. Rice then joined the Munich Thunder of the Football League of Europe in Munich, Germany in 1994 and played quarterback for one season there as this was his last go around with professional football.

== Personal life ==
Tony Rice and his ex-wife Felicia have five children—Alex from Bad Girls Club (season 12), Madeline Santi, Anthony, Michael, and Jasmine. Anthony is a wide receiver for Central Michigan University.
