= Sal Aunese =

American football player (1968–1989)

No. 8
- Position: Quarterback

Personal information
- Born: May 8, 1968; Oceanside, California, U.S.
- Died: September 23, 1989 (aged 21); Denver, Colorado, U.S.
- Listed height: 5 ft 10 in (1.78 m)

Career information
- High school: Vista (Vista, California)

Awards and highlights
- Big 8 Newcomer of the Year (1987)

Siasau "Sal" Aunese (May 8, 1968 – September 23, 1989) was a college football player who played for the University of Colorado. Aunese was from Oceanside, California in San Diego County and was of Samoan descent. He died at age 21 from stomach cancer.

== Early life ==
Born in Oceanside in northern San Diego County, Aunese was raised there with his six siblings. His parents spoke Samoan at home growing up. He was an All-American Quarterback at Vista High School, where he and his teammates won not only the CIF San Diego Section championship, but also the state championship. He attracted interest from several college programs including the University of Nebraska and the University of Colorado Boulder.

Aunese's final high school transcript and his low ACT scores caused him to fall under the 1983 Convention Proposal No. 48, commonly referred to as Proposition 48. Because of this provision, he missed the freshman year of his college career.

== College career ==
Aunese chose Colorado after heavy recruiting from assistant coach Les Miles and head coach Bill McCartney. Because of the Prop 48 conditions, Aunese missed his first year of eligibility with the team in 1986. He came into the 1987 season and soon took over the starting job at quarterback that same year; he led the Buffaloes to a 7–4 record, but no postseason bowl game. Aunese was awarded the Big Eight Newcomer of the Year award after the season. Colorado was 8–3 in the 1988 regular season, but lost to Brigham Young in the Freedom Bowl.

== Illness and death ==
During his participation in the Freedom Bowl, coaches, players, and family noticed that Aunese was not his usual self. Teammates told him he looked sluggish on the field and family members wished he would be taken out of the game. In the months following the bowl game, Aunese experienced a multitude of symptoms, including coughing consistently, a loss of appetite, and vomiting blood, which caused him to miss many workouts and drills.

Aunese was examined in March 1989 and doctors diagnosed him with a rare form of inoperable stomach cancer. He was given six months to live after his initial diagnosis. Over the course of the next several months, Aunese continued to visit Colorado games and practices, but he continued to get weaker from the cancer and died at University Hospital in Denver on September 23.

Aunese's memorial service was held in Boulder at Macky Auditorium on the university campus. It was filled to capacity with over 2,000 mourners, and hundreds more outside. He was buried at Eternal Hills Memorial Park located in Oceanside, California. The football team dedicated the season to Aunese, customizing the team's jerseys with the name "Sal" sewn into their sleeves. They went 11–0 in the regular season, but lost to Notre Dame in the Orange Bowl. The Buffaloes did win the Orange Bowl rematch against Notre Dame by a point the following season, earning its only national championship.

== Personal life ==
Aunese had one child with Kristy McCartney, the daughter of his head coach Bill McCartney. Their son T. C. McCartney is a former LSU football player and recently a New England Patriots assistant coach.

== See also ==
- List of gridiron football players who died during their careers
