= WDRF =

WDRF may refer to:

- WQUL, a radio station (1510 AM) licensed to serve Woodruff, South Carolina, United States, which held the call sign WDRF from 1998 to 2009
- WPWA, a radio station (1590 AM) licensed to serve Chester, Pennsylvania, United States, which held the call sign WDRF from 1954 to 1959
