= Colorado–Nebraska football rivalry =

American college football rivalry

- Colorado Buffaloes Nebraska Cornhuskers
- Sport: Football
- First meeting: November 17, 1898; Nebraska, 23–10
- Latest meeting: September 7, 2024; Nebraska, 28–10

Statistics
- Total meetings: 73
- All-time series: Nebraska leads, 50–21–2
- Largest victory: Nebraska, 59–0 (1981)
- Longest win streak: Nebraska, 18 (1968–1985)
- Current win streak: Nebraska, 1 (2024)

Locations of Colorado and Nebraska

The Colorado–Nebraska football rivalry is an American college football rivalry between the Colorado Buffaloes and Nebraska Cornhuskers. The teams first played in 1898 and began meeting annually when Colorado joined the MVIAA in 1948. The rivalry intensified as Colorado improved under Bill McCartney, peaking in the 1990s with several high-profile matchups. The annual series ended when both schools departed the Big 12 Conference in 2011.

The rivalry's intensity was often disputed – while Colorado generally viewed Nebraska as its biggest rival, Nebraska historically prioritized its series with Oklahoma. After the formation of the Big 12 in 1996, Colorado replaced Oklahoma as Nebraska's traditional Black Friday opponent.

== History ==
=== Early years ===
Colorado and Nebraska first met on November 17, 1898, a 23–10 NU victory in Boulder. They met five more times through 1907, when the series was paused for over forty years. The Buffaloes and Cornhuskers began an annual series when CU joined the Missouri Valley Intercollegiate Athletic Association (later the Big Eight Conference) in 1948. Colorado won nine of the first fourteen MVIAA meetings to take its only series lead (10–9–1).

Nebraska hired Bob Devaney in 1962 and quickly took control of the series against Colorado. Devaney and his successor Tom Osborne combined to lose to CU just once prior to 1986. Despite his team's dominance in the series, Osborne interviewed for Colorado's head coaching position in 1979, later saying "I thought there was enough unhappiness [in Lincoln] that maybe I ought to look for a job." CU offered a considerable salary increase and Osborne even traveled to Boulder to meet the team, but he ultimately declined the offer. Colorado instead hired former Oklahoma head coach Chuck Fairbanks, who led the Sooners against Devaney and NU in the famous "Game of the Century." Turner Gill made his first start as Nebraska's quarterback in 1981, setting an NCAA record with forty-two first downs in a 59–0 victory over Colorado, the largest margin of victory in series history.

=== McCartney ignites a rivalry ===
When Fairbanks was dismissed in 1982, CU turned to Bill McCartney, who loudly declared Nebraska to be Colorado's primary rival. His proclamation was met with ridicule, as Colorado was among the country's worst programs at the time, but his upstart Buffaloes ended an eighteen-game losing streak to Nebraska with a 20–10 upset in 1986. By the late 1980s McCartney had established CU on the national scene with his "flexbone" offense, defeating Nebraska in the rivalry's first top-five meeting, three months after starting quarterback Sal Aunese died of cancer. CU beat NU for the third time in five years in 1990 to repeat as Big Eight champion, the last time McCartney defeated the Cornhuskers.

After a tie in 1991 led to a split Big Eight title, Nebraska reasserted control of the series. The Cornhuskers dominated the Buffaloes 52–7 the following year in the first game ever between teams tied in the AP poll. It was the same week that Nebraska defensive coordinator Charlie McBride, a former Colorado player, made an abrupt switch to the 4–3 defense, a departure from his traditional 5–2 designed to counter the pass-heavy offenses of Colorado, Florida State, and Miami.

McCartney retired in 1994, weeks after a 24–7 loss to the Cornhuskers in which McBride's defense again acted as "Kordell's Kryptonite," shutting down Buffaloes star quarterback Kordell Stewart for a third straight meeting.

=== Big 12 era and the end of the series ===
In 1996, Colorado and Nebraska were placed in the Big 12 North Division when the Big Eight merged with four Texas schools of the Southwest. With Oklahoma in the South Division, Colorado replaced the Sooners as Nebraska's day-after-Thanksgiving opponent. The Cornhuskers beat the Buffaloes 17–12 in the first Black Friday game of the rivalry, which was widely expected to determine half of the national championship game, but NU was upset by Texas a week later. By the end of the decade Nebraska extended its win streak in the series to nine, six of them by five points or fewer, including a wild 1999 game in which No. 3 NU won in overtime after losing a 27–3 lead.

Nebraska visited Boulder in 2001 as the BCS's top-ranked team to decide the Big 12 North championship. Colorado led by as many as thirty-two points and won 62–36 behind a school-record six touchdowns from running back Chris Brown. The game is often cited as the end of Nebraska's dynasty, though the Cornhuskers were still controversially selected over Colorado and Oregon to face Miami in the national title game. The Hurricanes won convincingly, prompting sweeping changes to the BCS selection process, including the elimination of margin-of-victory criteria and an increased emphasis on human polling.

In 2007, Colorado beat Nebraska 65–51 in Bill Callahan's final game as NU's head coach, a game that featured 1,128 combined yards of offense. The Cornhuskers won the next three meetings under Bo Pelini, the final games between CU and NU as conference opponents. During the last of these, already-fired head coach Dan Hawkins sat in the press box at Memorial Stadium to watch his son Cody play quarterback for the Buffaloes. The annual series ended when Nebraska joined the Big Ten Conference in 2011, with Iowa replacing Colorado as NU's Black Friday opponent. Colorado joined the Pac-12 the same year, but returned to the Big 12 in 2024.

The series was renewed for four games between 2018 and 2024, with three Colorado victories, including a 2018 upset in Scott Frost's debut as Nebraska head coach. In 2023, the teams met in the second game of Deion Sanders's tenure at Colorado and Matt Rhule's tenure at Nebraska, a decisive Buffaloes victory in Boulder; a year later, Nebraska defeated CU in Lincoln. No future games are scheduled.

== Bison head trophy ==
In 1927, Nebraska's Innocents Society began exchanging the Victory Bell with Missouri's QEBH. Decades later, the Innocents Society created a second trophy game, a mounted bison head named Mr. Chips to be traded with Colorado's Heart and Dagger Society. CU won the first game of the trophy series in 1951. The exchange ended in 1962 when the Heart and Dagger Society lost the trophy and could not present it after NU's victory in Boulder.

== Game results ==
Colorado victories	Nebraska victories	Tie games

No.	Date	Location	Winning team		Losing team	
1	November 17, 1898	Boulder	Nebraska	23	Colorado	10
2	October 4, 1902	Boulder	Nebraska	10	Colorado	0
3	October 24, 1903	Lincoln	Nebraska	31	Colorado	0
4	October 8, 1904	Boulder	Colorado	6	Nebraska	0
5	November 11, 1905	Lincoln	Nebraska	18	Colorado	0
6	October 26, 1907	Lincoln	Nebraska	22	Colorado	8
7	October 9, 1948	Boulder	Colorado	16	Nebraska	9
8	November 19, 1949	Lincoln	Nebraska	25	Colorado	14
9	October 14, 1950	Boulder	Colorado	28	Nebraska	19
10	November 17, 1951	Lincoln	Colorado	36	Nebraska	14
11	October 25, 1952	Boulder	Tie	16	Tie	16
12	November 14, 1953	Lincoln	Colorado	14	Nebraska	10
13	October 23, 1954	Boulder	Nebraska	20	No. 11 Colorado	6
14	November 12, 1955	Lincoln	Nebraska	37	Colorado	20
15	October 27, 1956	Boulder	Colorado	16	Nebraska	0
16	November 16, 1957	Lincoln	Colorado	27	Nebraska	0
17	October 25, 1958	Boulder	No. 12 Colorado	27	Nebraska	16
18	November 14, 1959	Lincoln	Nebraska	14	Colorado	12
19	October 22, 1960	Boulder	Colorado	19	Nebraska	6
20	November 18, 1961	Lincoln	No. 8 Colorado	7	Nebraska	0
21	October 27, 1962	Boulder	Nebraska	31	Colorado	6
22	October 26, 1963	Lincoln	Nebraska	41	Colorado	6
23	October 24, 1964	Boulder	No. 5 Nebraska	21	Colorado	3
24	October 23, 1965	Lincoln	No. 3 Nebraska	38	Colorado	13
25	October 22, 1966	Boulder	No. 7 Nebraska	21	Colorado	19
26	October 21, 1967	Lincoln	No. 4 Colorado	21	No. 13 Nebraska	16
27	November 16, 1968	Boulder	Nebraska	22	Colorado	6
28	November 1, 1969	Lincoln	Nebraska	20	No. 18 Colorado	7
29	October 31, 1970	Boulder	No. 4 Nebraska	29	Colorado	13
30	October 30, 1971	Lincoln	No. 1 Nebraska	31	No. 9 Colorado	7
31	November 4, 1972	Boulder	No. 3 Nebraska	33	No. 15 Colorado	10
32	October 3, 1973	Lincoln	No. 13 Nebraska	28	No. 17 Colorado	16
33	November 2, 1974	Boulder	No. 9 Nebraska	31	Colorado	15
34	October 25, 1975	Lincoln	No. 4 Nebraska	63	Colorado	21
35	October 9, 1976	Boulder	No. 6 Nebraska	24	Colorado	12
36	October 22, 1977	Lincoln	No. 18 Nebraska	33	No. 7 Colorado	15
37	October 21, 1978	Boulder	No. 5 Nebraska	52	Colorado	14

No.	Date	Location	Winning team		Losing team	
38	October 27, 1979	Lincoln	No. 2 Nebraska	38	Colorado	10
39	October 25, 1980	Boulder	No. 9 Nebraska	45	Colorado	7
40	October 10, 1981	Lincoln	Nebraska	59	Colorado	0
41	October 9, 1982	Boulder	No. 7 Nebraska	40	Colorado	14
42	October 22, 1983	Lincoln	No. 1 Nebraska	69	Colorado	19
43	October 20, 1984	Boulder	No. 5 Nebraska	24	Colorado	7
44	October 26, 1985	Lincoln	No. 5 Nebraska	17	Colorado	7
45	October 25, 1986	Boulder	Colorado	20	No. 3 Nebraska	10
46	November 28, 1987	Boulder	No. 5 Nebraska	24	Colorado	7
47	November 12, 1988	Lincoln	No. 7 Nebraska	7	No. 19 Colorado	0
48	November 4, 1989	Boulder	No. 3 Colorado	27	No. 2 Nebraska	21
49	November 3, 1990	Lincoln	No. 9 Colorado	27	No. 3 Nebraska	12
50	November 2, 1991	Boulder	Tie	19	Tie	19
51	October 31, 1992	Lincoln	No. 8 Nebraska	52	No. 8 Colorado	7
52	October 30, 1993	Boulder	No. 6 Nebraska	21	No. 20 Colorado	17
53	October 29, 1994	Lincoln	No. 2 Nebraska	24	No. 3 Colorado	7
54	October 28, 1995	Boulder	No. 2 Nebraska	44	No. 7 Colorado	21
55	November 29, 1996	Lincoln	No. 4 Nebraska	17	No. 5 Colorado	12
56	November 28, 1997	Boulder	No. 2 Nebraska	27	Colorado	24
57	November 27, 1998	Lincoln	No. 14 Nebraska	16	Colorado	14
58	November 26, 1999	Boulder	No. 3 Nebraska	33	Colorado	30^{OT}
59	November 24, 2000	Lincoln	No. 10 Nebraska	34	Colorado	32
60	November 23, 2001	Boulder	No. 14 Colorado	62	No. 2 Nebraska	36
61	November 29, 2002	Lincoln	No. 13 Colorado	28	Nebraska	13
62	November 28, 2003	Boulder	No. 25 Nebraska	31	Colorado	22
63	November 26, 2004	Lincoln	Colorado	26	Nebraska	20
64	November 25, 2005	Boulder	Nebraska	30	Colorado	3
65	November 24, 2006	Lincoln	No. 23 Nebraska	37	Colorado	14
66	November 23, 2007	Boulder	Colorado	65	Nebraska	51
67	November 28, 2008	Lincoln	Nebraska	40	Colorado	31
68	November 27, 2009	Boulder	Nebraska	28	Colorado	20
69	November 26, 2010	Lincoln	No. 16 Nebraska	45	Colorado	17
70	September 8, 2018	Lincoln	Colorado	33	Nebraska	28
71	September 7, 2019	Boulder	Colorado	34	No. 25 Nebraska	31^{OT}
72	September 9, 2023	Boulder	No. 22 Colorado	36	Nebraska	14
73	September 7, 2024	Lincoln	Nebraska	28	Colorado	10
Series: Nebraska leads 50–21–2

== See also ==
- List of NCAA college football rivalry games
