= Tory Dandy =

American football agent

Tory Dandy is an NFL football agent and philanthropist. He is an equity partner at Athlete's First, and previously spent nine years as the co-head and managing partner of Creative Artists Agency’s Sports Football Division – and was the first African-American to hold the position.

== Early life ==
Dandy was born in Woodruff, South Carolina. He played football throughout high school, mostly playing on defense or as a wide receiver. Though an untreated shoulder injury led him to miss out on opportunities with major recruiters, he ultimately accepted a scholarship to play Division II football for Tusculum College (now Tusculum University) in Tennessee and then transferred to South Carolina State University. After experiencing additional injuries on the field, Dandy made the decision to stop playing football and returned to Tusculum. In 2002, he earned his degree in Business Management with a minor in Sports Management. After that, he received an MBA from Webster University in 2004.

== Sports agency career ==
After Dandy stopped playing college football, he attended the Black Sports Agents Association's annual conference and went on to get an internship at a small agency in South Carolina called Synergy Sports in 2004. He attracted the attention of influential sports agent Eugene Parker, and when Synergy Sports ceased operations, he became director of recruiting at Parker's company Maximum Sports in 2006. Parker provided mentorship to Dandy until his death.

After Parker died in 2016, Dandy's contract expired and he found himself at a career crossroads. CAA Sports contacted him, and he accepted a role in their NFL division later that year.

Dandy was recognized as part of Sports Business Journal's Forty Under 40 in 2018.

In 2020, Dandy was promoted to co-head and managing partner of CAA's Sports Football Division. There, he represents more than 50 NFL players, including multiple all-pro, pro-bowl and first-round draft picks.

== Contracts ==
Dandy's active contracts are reported to total over $1.6 billion and in 2022 alone, he negotiated over $660 million for CAA clients. As a co-head, he also oversees $4 billion in contracts.

In 2021 and 2022, he negotiated several historic contracts for prominent players, including; $100 million, 4-year contract for A.J. Brown with the Philadelphia Eagles; a $97.6 million contract extension for Marshon Lattimore with the New Orleans Saints; and a $100.5 million, five-year contract extension for Denzel Ward with the Cleveland Browns, making him the NFL's highest paid cornerback at the time.

In recent years, Dandy has negotiated contracts for A.J. Brown, DK Metcalf, and Deebo Samuel totaling $100, $72, and $73.5 million respectively.

In 2024, he negotiated the biggest contracts for wide receivers in NFL history, netting A.J. Brown a $96 million, 3-year contract with $84 million guaranteed to continue playing for the Eagles, and a 4-year, $136 million contract with the Cowboys for CeeDee Lamb, including a $38 million signing bonus – the highest ever given to a wide receiver. He also negotiated the largest contract for a defensive back in NFL history for Patrick Surtain II, who received a $96 million, 4-year contract with $77 million guaranteed from the Bronco's. In 2025, he negotiated the largest contract for a guard in NFL history for Trey Smith, who received a $94 million, 4-year contract extension with the Kansas City Chiefs.

== Notable clients ==
In 2009, three years into his role at Maximum Sports, Dandy recruited Tyson Jackson, who was the number-three overall NFL draft pick that year and went on to play for the Kansas City Chiefs.

At CAA, Dandy represents NFL players including Deebo Samuel, Patrick Surtain, Chris Godwin, A.J. Brown, Denzel Ward, DeAndre Hopkins, Marshon Lattimore, CeDee Lamb, and Mike Williams.

== Philanthropy and charitable work ==
Dandy established the Tory Dandy Educational Scholarship in 2013, which awards financial assistance annually to a graduating senior at Woodruff High School, where Dandy attended. Through his Tory Dandy Foundation, which aims to assist underprivileged youth, he has also made financial contributions to local South Carolina nonprofits and has donated to support youth services throughout the state.

In recognition of Dandy's contributions and achievements, the cities of Woodruff and Spartanburg gave him a key to the city in 2020 and proclaimed August 29 “Tory Dandy Day.”
