= T. C. McCartney =

American football player and coach (born 1984)

Green Bay Packers
- Title: Offensive quality control coach

Personal information
- Born: April 24, 1989 (age 37); Boulder, Colorado, U.S.
- Listed height: 6 ft 3 in (1.91 m)
- Listed weight: 216 lb (98 kg)

Career information
- High school: Fairview (Boulder)
- College: LSU (2007-2010)

Career history
- LSU (2011) Graduate assistant; Colorado (2012–2013) Graduate assistant; Cleveland Browns (2014) Offensive assistant; San Francisco 49ers (2015) Offensive assistant/quality control coach; LSU (2016) Graduate assistant; San Francisco 49ers (2017–2018) Offensive assistant/quality control coach; Denver Broncos (2019) Quarterbacks coach; Cleveland Browns (2020–2021) Offensive assistant; Cleveland Browns (2022–2023) Tight ends coach; New England Patriots (2024) Quarterbacks coach; Green Bay Packers (2026–present) Offensive quality control coach

Awards and highlights
- As player: BCS national champion (2007)

Timothy Chase McCartney (born April 24, 1989) is an American professional football coach and former player who is the offensive quality control coach for the Green Bay Packers of the National Football League (NFL). He previously served as the quarterbacks coach for the New England Patriots in 2024.

McCartney played college football for the LSU Tigers and began his coaching career there in 2011. He has also previously served as an assistant coach for the Cleveland Browns, Denver Broncos, San Francisco 49ers.

== Playing career ==
McCartney was expected to take a spot on the roster at the University of Colorado Boulder offered by Buffaloes head coach and former assistant of his grandfather, Gary Barnett. However, Barnett was forced to resign in 2005 and the deal fell through when Dan Hawkins was hired. He then walked on to play quarterback at LSU in 2007, playing for Les Miles, another former Colorado assistant under the elder McCartney and the coach who recruited his father. He was redshirted his freshman year in 2007, the year the Tigers won a national championship. Despite this, McCartney still received a championship ring as a member of the team. He was the quarterback for the scout team for three years before turning to coaching in 2011.

== Coaching career ==
=== Early career ===
After his graduation from LSU, he spent the 2011 season as a graduate assistant with the Tigers that won the SEC Championship Game and earned a berth in the BCS national championship game. He joined the coaching staff at Colorado in 2012 as a graduate assistant. He was hired to be an offensive assistant for the Cleveland Browns in 2014, before joining the coaching staff of the San Francisco 49ers as an offensive assistant/quality control coach in 2015. He rejoined his alma mater LSU in 2016 as a graduate assistant.

=== San Francisco 49ers (second stint) ===
In 2017, McCartney was re-hired as an offensive assistant & quality control coach for the 49ers. He reunited with head coach Kyle Shanahan, who served as offensive coordinator of the Cleveland Browns in 2014 while McCartney was an offensive assistant.

=== Denver Broncos ===
After then-49ers quarterbacks coach Rich Scangarello was hired as the offensive coordinator for the Denver Broncos in 2019, McCartney followed Scangarello to Denver to serve as quarterbacks coach. McCartney was the only offensive assistant brought over by Scangarello from San Francisco.

He was fired after Scangarello was terminated in January 2020.

=== Cleveland Browns (second stint) ===
In 2020, McCartney re-joined the Browns' coaching staff as an offensive assistant. In 2022, McCartney was promoted to Tight Ends coach, replacing new Quarterbacks coach Drew Petzing. On January 17, 2024, days after a Wild Card loss to the Houston Texans, head coach Kevin Stefanski fired McCartney.

=== New England Patriots ===
On February 19, 2024, McCartney was hired by the New England Patriots as their quarterbacks coach under head coach Jerod Mayo. On January 24, 2025, it was announced that McCartney and the Patriots were parting ways.

=== Green Bay Packers ===
On March 19, 2026, the Green Bay Packers hired McCartney as an offensive quality control coach.

== Personal life ==
McCartney is the son of Kristy McCartney, the daughter of former Colorado head coach Bill McCartney; and Sal Aunese, a quarterback for Colorado. His parents had already broken up shortly after he was conceived, and he carried his mother's last name; Aunese died of cancer shortly after T. C. McCartney was born.
