= 1989 Notre Dame Fighting Irish football team =

American college football season

1989 Notre Dame Fighting Irish football

National champion (Berryman, Eck, FACT, Sagarin) Orange Bowl champion

Orange Bowl, W 21–6 vs. Colorado
- Conference: Independent

Ranking
- Coaches: No. 3
- AP: No. 2
- Record: 12–1
- Head coach: Lou Holtz (4th season)
- Offensive coordinator: Jim Strong (1st season)
- Offensive scheme: Wishbone triple option
- Defensive coordinator: Barry Alvarez (2nd season)
- Base defense: 5–2
- MVP: Tony Rice
- Captains: Ned Bolcar; Anthony Johnson; Tony Rice
- Home stadium: Notre Dame Stadium

1989 NCAA Division I-A independents football records
	Conf.			Overall
Team	W	L	T	W		L		T
No. 1 Miami (FL)		–		11	–	1	–	0
No. 2 Notre Dame		–		12	–	1	–	0
No. 3 Florida State		–		10	–	2	–	0
Northern Illinois		–		9	–	2	–	0
No. 15 Penn State		–		8	–	3	–	1
No. 17 Pittsburgh		–		8	–	3	–	1
No. 21 West Virginia		–		8	–	3	–	1
Syracuse		–		8	–	4	–	0
Southwestern Louisiana		–		7	–	4	–	0
Akron		–		6	–	4	–	1
South Carolina		–		6	–	4	–	1
Virginia Tech		–		6	–	4	–	1
Louisiana Tech		–		5	–	4	–	1
Army		–		6	–	5	–	0
Louisville		–		6	–	5	–	0
East Carolina		–		5	–	5	–	1
Tulsa		–		6	–	6	–	0
Southern Miss		–		5	–	6	–	0
Tulane		–		4	–	8	–	0
Navy		–		3	–	8	–	0
Rutgers		–		2	–	7	–	2
Boston College		–		2	–	9	–	0
Memphis State		–		2	–	9	–	0
Cincinnati		–		1	–	9	–	1
Temple		–		1	–	10	–	0
Rankings from AP Poll

The 1989 Notre Dame Fighting Irish football team was an American football team that represented the University of Notre Dame as an independent during the 1989 NCAA Division I-A football season. In their fourth year under head coach Lou Holtz, the Irish compiled a 12–1 record, outscored opponents by a total of 406 to 183, and were ranked No. 2 in the final AP poll and No.3 in the final UPI poll. In a matchup between No. 1 and No. 2, they defeated Michigan in the second week of the season. Ranked No. 1 for 11 consecutive weeks, their only loss came against No. 7 Miami (FL) in the last game of the regular season. They concluded the year with a victory over No. 1 Colorado in the Orange Bowl.

Quarterback Tony Rice won the Football News College Player of the Year award and the Johnny Unitas Golden Arm Award. Several players, including Rice, Todd Lyght, Chris Zorich, and Rocket Ismail received first-team honors on the 1989 All-America college football team. The team's statistical leaders included Rice (1,233 passing yards, 884 rushing yards), Ismail (1,628 all-purpose yards), and linebacker Ned Bolcar (109 tackles).

The team played its home games at Notre Dame Stadium in Notre Dame, Indiana.

== Schedule ==
Date	Time	Opponent	Rank	Site	TV	Result	Attendance	Source
August 31	8:00 p.m.	vs. Virginia	No. 2	Giants Stadium; East Rutherford, NJ (Kickoff Classic)	Raycom, WGN	W 36–13	77,323	
September 16	3:30 p.m.	at No. 2 Michigan	No. 1	Michigan Stadium; Ann Arbor, MI (rivalry)	ABC	W 24–19	105,912	
September 23	2:30 p.m.	Michigan State	No. 1	Notre Dame Stadium; Notre Dame, IN (rivalry)	CBS	W 21–13	59,075	
September 30	12:00 p.m.	at Purdue	No. 1	Ross–Ade Stadium; West Lafayette, IN (rivalry)	ABC	W 40–7	67,861	
October 7	4:00 p.m.	at Stanford	No. 1	Stanford Stadium; Stanford, CA (rivalry)		W 27–17	86,019	
October 14	7:00 p.m.	at No. 17 Air Force	No. 1	Falcon Stadium; Colorado Springs, CO (rivalry)	ESPN	W 41–27	53,533	
October 21	3:30 p.m.	No. 9 USC	No. 1	Notre Dame Stadium; Notre Dame, IN (rivalry)	CBS	W 28–24	59,075	
October 28	5:00 p.m.	No. 7 Pittsburgh	No. 1	Notre Dame Stadium; Notre Dame, IN (rivalry)	ESPN	W 45–7	59,075	
November 4	12:00 p.m.	Navy	No. 1	Notre Dame Stadium; Notre Dame, IN (rivalry)	SportsChannel	W 41–0	59,075	
November 11	12:00 p.m.	SMU	No. 1	Notre Dame Stadium; Notre Dame, IN	SportsChannel	W 59–6	59,075	
November 18	2:30 p.m.	at No. 17 Penn State	No. 1	Beaver Stadium; University Park, PA (rivalry)	CBS	W 34–23	86,025	
November 25	6:30 p.m.	at No. 7 Miami (FL)	No. 1	Miami Orange Bowl; Miami, FL (rivalry)	CBS	L 10–27	81,634	
January 1, 1990	8:00 p.m.	vs. No. 1 Colorado	No. 4	Miami Orange Bowl; Miami, FL (Orange Bowl)	NBC	W 21–6	81,191	
Rankings from AP Poll released prior to the game; All times are in Eastern time

== Games summaries ==
=== Vs. Virginia ===
Kickoff Classic: No. 2 Notre Dame Fighting Irish (0–0) vs. Virginia Cavaliers (0–0)

Quarter	1	2	3	4	Total
Cavaliers	0	0	0	13	13
No. 2 Fighting Irish	19	14	0	3	36

at Giants Stadium, East Rutherford, New Jersey

- Date: August 31
- Game time: 8:00 p.m. EDT
- Game attendance: 77,323
- TV announcers (Raycom Sports): Phil Stone and Dave Rowe
- Recap/Box Score

Game information

First quarter

- ND – Ricky Watters 2-yard run (Billy Hackett kick), 10:46. Notre Dame 7–0.
- ND – Anthony Johnson 1-yard run (kick failed), 4:38. Notre Dame 13–0.
- ND – Rodney Culver 2-yard run (run failed), 1:28. Notre Dame 19–0.

Second quarter

- ND – Anthony Johnson 1-yard run (Craig Hentrich kick), 8:47. Notre Dame 26–0.
- ND – Tony Rice 3-yard run (Craig Hentrich kick), 5:11. Notre Dame 33–0.

Third quarter

- No scoring

Fourth quarter

- UVA – Derek Dooley 6-yard pass from Shawn Moore (Jake McInerney kick), 12:41. Notre Dame 33–7.
- UVA – Bruce McGonnigal 2-yard pass from Shawn Moore. Notre Dame 33–13.
- ND – Craig Hentrich 32-yard field goal, 1:46. Notre Dame 36–13.

Top passers

- UVA – Shawn Moore – 10/22, 85 yards, 2 TD, 2 INT
- ND – Tony Rice – 7/11, 147 yards

Top rushers

- UVA – Marcus Wilson – 15 rushes, 80 yards
- ND – Ricky Watters – 12 rushes, 80 yards, TD

Top receivers

- UVA – Herman Moore – 2 receptions, 30 yards
- ND – Raghib Ismail – 5 receptions, 121 yards

=== At No. 2 Michigan ===
No. 1 Notre Dame Fighting Irish (1–0) at No. 2 Michigan Wolverines (0–0)

Quarter	1	2	3	4	Total
No. 1 Fighting Irish	0	7	10	7	24
No. 2 Wolverines	0	6	0	13	19

at Michigan Stadium, Ann Arbor, Michigan

- Date: September 16
- Game time: 3:30 p.m. EDT
- Game weather: Rain
- Game attendance: 105,912
- TV announcers (ABC): Keith Jackson and Bob Griese
- Recap/Box Score

Game information

First quarter

- No scoring

Second quarter

- ND – Anthony Johnson 6-yard pass from Tony Rice (Craig Hentrich kick), 5:05. Notre Dame 7–0. Drive: 24 yards.
- MICH – Chris Calloway 9-yard pass from Michael Taylor (kick failed), 0:25. Notre Dame 7–6. Drive: 50 yards.

Third quarter

- ND – Raghib Ismail 89-yard kickoff return (Craig Hentrich kick), 14:49. Notre Dame 14–6.
- ND – Craig Hentrich 30-yard field goal, 4:28. Notre Dame 17–6.

Fourth quarter

- MICH – Derrick Walker 5-yard pass from Elvis Grbac (pass failed), 12:58. Notre Dame 17–12. Drive: 12 plays.
- ND – Raghib Ismail 92-yard kickoff return (Craig Hentrich kick), 12:46. Notre Dame 24–13.
- MICH – Greg McMurtry 4-yard pass from Elvis Grbac (J.D. Carlson kick), 4:08. Notre Dame 24–19. Drive: 13 plays, 67 yards.

Top passers

- ND – Tony Rice – 1/2, 6 yards, TD
- MICH – Elvis Grbac – 17/21, 134 yards, 2 TD

Top rushers

- ND – Anthony Johnson – 20 rushes, 80 yards
- MICH – Leroy Hoard – 15 rushes, 56 yards

Top receivers

- ND – Anthony Johnson – 1 reception, 6 yards, TD
- MICH – Greg McMurtry – 4 receptions, 51 yards, TD

=== Michigan State ===
Michigan State Spartans (1–0) at No. 1 Notre Dame Fighting Irish (2–0)

Quarter	1	2	3	4	Total
Spartans	0	6	7	0	13
No. 1 Fighting Irish	7	7	0	7	21

at Notre Dame Stadium, South Bend, Indiana

- Date: September 23
- Game time: 3:30 p.m. EDT
- Game attendance: 59,075
- TV announcers (CBS): Jim Nantz and Pat Haden
- Recap/Box Score

Game information

First quarter

- ND – Ricky Watters 2-yard run (Craig Hentrich kick), 4:54. Notre Dame 7–0. Drive: 14 plays, 72 yards, 6:16.

Second quarter

- ND – Ricky Watters 53-yard run (Craig Hentrich kick), 9:10. Notre Dame 14–0.
- MSU – John Langeloh 36-yard field goal, 2:54. Notre Dame 14–3.
- MSU – John Langeloh 38-yard field goal, 0:00. Notre Dame 14–6.

Third quarter

- MSU – James Bradley 30-yard pass from Dan Enos (John Langeloh kick), 6:36. Notre Dame 14–13.

Fourth quarter

- ND – Anthony Johnson 1-yard run (Craig Hentrich kick), 8:16. Notre Dame 21–13. Drive: 9 plays, 62 yards.

Top passers

- MSU – Dan Enos – 18/28, 200 yards, TD
- ND – Tony Rice – 8/15, 90 yards

Top rushers

- MSU – Hyland Hickson – 26 rushes, 84 yards
- ND – Ricky Watters – 16 rushes, 89 yards, 2 TD

Top receivers

- MSU – Courtney Hawkins – 6 receptions, 83 yards
- ND – Raghib Ismail – 2 receptions, 27 yards

=== At Purdue ===
No. 1 Notre Dame Fighting Irish (3–0) at Purdue Boilermakers (1–1)

Quarter	1	2	3	4	Total
No. 1 Fighting Irish	14	20	0	6	40
Boilermakers	0	0	0	7	7

at Ross–Ade Stadium, West Lafayette, Indiana

- Date: September 30
- Game time: 12:00 p.m. EDT
- Game attendance: 67,861
- TV: ABC
- Recap/Box Score

Game information

First quarter

- ND – Anthony Johnson 6-yard run (Craig Hentrich kick), 6:38. Notre Dame 7–0. Drive: 55 yards.
- ND – Tony Rice 4-yard run (Craig Hentrich kick), 2:04. Notre Dame 14–0. Drive: 57 yards.

Second quarter

- ND – Jeff Alm 16-yard interception return (Craig Hentrich kick), 14:44. Notre Dame 21–0.
- ND – Anthony Johnson 1-yard run (Craig Hentrich kick), 6:35. Notre Dame 28–0.
- ND – Ricky Watters 1-yard run (kick failed), 0:14. Notre Dame 34–0.

Third quarter

- No scoring

Fourth quarter

- ND – Craig Hentrich 19-yard field goal, 9:47. Notre Dame 37–0.
- ND – Craig Hentrich 22-yard field goal, 6:18. Notre Dame 40–0.
- PUR – Rodney Dennis 3-yard pass from Steve Letnich (Larry Sullivan kick), 0:33. Notre Dame 40–7.

Top passers

- ND – Tony Rice – 12/15, 270 yards
- PUR – Steve Letnich – 11/28, 89 yards, INT

Top rushers

- ND – Tony Rice – 12 rushes, 67 yards, TD
- PUR – Steve Letnich – 13 rushes, 50 yards

Top receivers

- ND – Derek Brown – 4 receptions, 101 yards
- PUR – Earl Coleman – 2 receptions, 32 yards

=== At Stanford ===
No. 1 Notre Dame Fighting Irish (4–0) at Stanford Cardinal (1–3)

Quarter	1	2	3	4	Total
No. 1 Fighting Irish	0	14	7	6	27
Cardinal	6	0	8	3	17

at Stanford Stadium, Stanford, California

- Date: October 7
- Game time: 4:00 p.m. EDT / 1:00 p.m. PDT
- Game attendance: 86,019
- Recap/Box Score

Game information

First quarter

- STAN – John Hopkins 34-yard field goal, 5:14. Stanford 3–0. Drive: 14 plays.
- STAN – John Hopkins 42-yard field goal, 2:40. Stanford 6–0.

Second quarter

- ND – Anthony Johnson 7-yard run (Craig Hentrich kick), 12:24. Notre Dame 7–6. Drive: 4 plays, 64 yards.
- ND – Rodney Culver 2-yard run (Craig Hentrich kick), 1:15. Notre Dame 14–6. Drive: 9 plays.

Third quarter

- STAN – Ed McCaffrey 2-yard pass from Smith (run good), Tie 14–14. Drive: 79 yards.
- ND – Anthony Johnson 1-yard run (Craig Hentrich kick), 7:28. Notre Dame 21–14.

Fourth quarter

- ND – Craig Hentrich 20-yard field goal, 12:42. Notre Dame 24–14.
- STAN – John Hopkins 27-yard field goal, 8:14. Notre Dame 24–17. Drive: 12 plays, 70 yards.
- ND – Craig Hentrich 18-yard field goal, 1:27. Notre Dame 27–17.

Top passers

- ND – Tony Rice – 7/17, 102 yards
- STAN – Steve Smith – 39/68, 282 yards, TD, 3 INT

Top rushers

- ND – Anthony Johnson – 15 rushes, 75 yards, 2 TD
- STAN – Tommy Vardell – 9 rushes, 22 yards

Top receivers

- ND – Raghib Ismail – 3 receptions, 67 yards
- STAN – Jim Price – 14 receptions, 98 yards

=== At No. 17 Air Force ===
No. 1 Notre Dame Fighting Irish (5–0) at No. 17 Air Force Falcons (6–0)

Quarter	1	2	3	4	Total
No. 1 Fighting Irish	14	21	3	3	41
No. 17 Falcons	0	14	0	13	27

at Falcon Stadium, Colorado Springs, Colorado

- Date: October 14
- Game time: 7:00 p.m. EDT / 5:00 p.m. MDT
- Game attendance: 53,533
- TV announcers (ESPN): Ron Franklin and Kevin Kiley
- Recap/Box Score

Game information

First quarter

- ND – Anthony Johnson 1-yard run (Craig Hentrich kick), 9:41. Notre Dame 7–0. Drive: 80 yards.
- ND – Ricky Watters 5-yard run (Craig Hentrich kick), 0:51. Notre Dame 14–0. Drive: 14 plays, 69 yards.

Second quarter

- ND – Raghib Ismail 56-yard punt return (Craig Hentrich kick), 14:42. Notre Dame 21–0.
- AFA – Greg Johnson 61-yard pass from Dee Dowis (Joe Wood kick), 13:36. Notre Dame 21–7.
- ND – Anthony Johnson 27-yard pass from Tony Rice (Craig Hentrich kick), 9:46. Notre Dame 28–7.
- AFA – Steve Senn 26-yard pass from Dee Dowis (Joe Wood kick). Notre Dame 28–14.
- ND – Raghib Ismail 24-yard run (Craig Hentrich kick), 0:30. Notre Dame 35–14.

Third quarter

- ND – Craig Hentrich 20-yard field goal, 8:24. Notre Dame 38–14.

Fourth quarter

- ND – Craig Hentrich 38-yard field goal, 12:42. Notre Dame 41–14.
- AFA – Steven Wilson 23-yard run (run failed), 9:35. Notre Dame 41–20.
- AFA – Rodney Lewis 1-yard run (Joe Wood kick), 3:22. Notre Dame 41–27.

Top passers

- ND – Tony Rice – 9/13, 123 yards, TD
- AFA – Dee Dowis – 15/24, 306 yards, 2 TD, INT

Top rushers

- ND – Ricky Watters – 11 rushes, 96 yards, TD
- AFA – Rodney Lewis – 13 rushes, 58 yards, TD

Top receivers

- ND – Raghib Ismail – 3 receptions, 25 yards
- AFA – Steve Senn – 6 receptions, 101 yards, TD

External videos
- 1989 Notre Dame at Air Force – Television broadcast

=== No. 9 USC ===
No. 9 USC Trojans (5–1) at No. 1 Notre Dame Fighting Irish (6–0)

Quarter	1	2	3	4	Total
No. 9 Trojans	14	3	0	7	24
No. 1 Fighting Irish	7	0	7	14	28

at Notre Dame Stadium, South Bend, Indiana

- Date: October 21
- Game time: 3:30 p.m. EDT
- Game attendance: 59,075
- TV announcers (CBS): Jim Nantz and Pat Haden
- Recap/Box Score

Game information

First quarter

- USC – Larry Wallace 12-yard pass from Todd Marinovich (Quin Rodriguez kick), 12:47. USC 7–0.
- ND – Tony Rice 7-yard run (Craig Hentrich kick), 9:10. Tie 7–7.
- USC – John Jackson 15-yard pass from Todd Marinovich (Quin Rodriguez kick), 7:47. USC 14–7.

Second quarter

- USC – Quin Rodriguez 25-yard field goal, 10:22. USC 17–7.

Third quarter

- ND – Ricky Watters 2-yard run (Craig Hentrich kick), 9:17. USC 17–14. Drive: 8 plays.

Fourth quarter

- ND – Anthony Johnson 35-yard run (Craig Hentrich kick), 13:51. Notre Dame 21–17. Drive: 80 yards.
- USC – Gary Wellman 16-yard pass from Todd Marinovich (Quin Rodriguez kick), 9:01. USC 24–21. Drive: 4 plays.
- ND – Tony Rice 15-yard run (Craig Hentrich kick), 5:18. Notre Dame 28–24. Drive: 80 yards.

Top passers

- USC – Todd Marinovich – 33/55, 333 yards, 3 TD, 3 INT
- ND – Tony Rice – 5/16, 91 yards

Top rushers

- USC – Ricky Ervins – 12 rushes, 64 yards
- ND – Tony Rice – 18 rushes, 99 yards, 2 TD

Top receivers

- USC – John Jackson – 14 receptions, 200 yards, TD
- ND – Raghib Ismail – 2 receptions, 62 yards

External videos
- 1989 USC at Notre Dame – Television broadcast
- 1989 USC at Notre Dame – Highlights

=== No. 7 Pittsburgh ===
No. 7 Pittsburgh Panthers (5–0–1) at No. 1 Notre Dame Fighting Irish (7–0)

Quarter	1	2	3	4	Total
No. 7 Panthers	7	0	0	0	7
No. 1 Fighting Irish	2	15	21	7	45

- Date: October 28
- Game time: 5:00 p.m. EDT
- Game attendance: 59,075
- TV: ESPN
- Recap/Box

Game information

First quarter

- PITT – Ronald Redmon 8-yard pass from Alex Van Pelt (Ed Frazier kick), 9:32. Pittsburgh 7–0. Drive: 12 plays, 68 yards.
- ND – Safety, Alex Van Pelt downed in end zone, 6:07. Pittsburgh 7–2.

Second quarter

- ND – Rodney Culver 1-yard run (run good), 13:22. Notre Dame 10–7. Drive: 36 yards.
- ND – Pat Terrell 54-yard interception return (Craig Hentrich kick), 3:05. Notre Dame 17–7.

Third quarter

- ND – Ricky Watters 2-yard run (Craig Hentrich kick), 8:15. Notre Dame 24–7.
- ND – Raghib Ismail 50-yard run (Craig Hentrich kick), 4:53. Notre Dame 31–7.
- ND – Rodney Culver 1-yard run (Billy Hackett kick), 0:49. Notre Dame 38–7.

Fourth quarter

- ND – Steve Belles 13-yard run (Billy Hackett kick), 4:12. Notre Dame 45–7.

Top passers

- PITT – Alex Van Pelt – 16/33, 170 yards
- ND – Tony Rice – 1/7, 29 yards

Top rushers

- PITT – Curvin Richards – 15 rushes, 47 yards
- ND – Raghib Ismail – 18 rushes, 74 yards, TD

Top receivers

- PITT – Lionel Sykes – 6 receptions, 65 yards
- ND – Raghib Ismail – 1 reception, 29 yards

=== Navy ===
Navy Midshipmen (2–5) at No. 1 Notre Dame Fighting Irish (8–0)

Quarter	1	2	3	4	Total
Midshipmen	0	0	0	0	0
No. 1 Fighting Irish	14	10	3	14	41

at Notre Dame Stadium, South Bend, Indiana

- Date: November 4
- Game time: 12:00 p.m. EST
- Game attendance: 59,075
- TV: SportsChannel
- Recap/Box Score

Game information

First quarter

- ND – Tony Rice 6-yard run (Craig Hentrich kick), 11:49. Notre Dame 7–0. Drive: 64 yards.
- ND – Rodney Culver 11-yard run (Craig Hentrich kick), 3:18. Notre Dame 14–0. Drive: 64 yards.

Second quarter

- ND – Ricky Watters 48-yard run (Craig Hentrich kick), 8:36. Notre Dame 21–0.
- ND – Billy Hackett 27-yard field goal, 0:16. Notre Dame 24–0. Drive: 14 plays, 50 yards.

Third quarter

- ND – Billy Hackett 39-yard field goal, 11:58. Notre Dame 27–0.

Fourth quarter

- ND – Dorsey Levens 2-yard run (Craig Hentrich kick), 14:38. Notre Dame 34–0.
- ND – Ted McNamara 1-yard run (Craig Hentrich kick), 4:40. Notre Dame 41–0.

Top passers

- NAVY – Alton Grizzard – 8/14, 94 yards
- ND – Rick Mirer – 8/12, 64 yards

Top rushers

- NAVY – Rodney Purifoy – 11 rushes, 50 yards
- ND – Ricky Watters – 9 rushes, 134 yards, TD

Top receivers

- NAVY – Shane Smith – 3 receptions, 50 yards
- ND – Adrian Jarrell – 3 receptins, 28 yards

External videos
- Full game

=== SMU ===
SMU Mustangs (2–6) at No. 1 Notre Dame Fighting Irish (9–0)

Quarter	1	2	3	4	Total
Mustangs	0	6	0	0	6
No. 1 Fighting Irish	7	35	10	7	59

at Notre Dame Stadium, South Bend, Indiana

- Date: November 11
- Game time: 12:00 p.m. EST
- Game attendance: 59,075
- Recap/Box Score

Game information

First quarter

- ND – Ricky Watters 35-yard run (Craig Hentrich kick), 6:54. Notre Dame 7–0. Drive: 6 plays, 79 yards.

Second quarter

- ND – Pete Graham 1-yard run (Craig Hentrich kick), 14:22. Notre Dame 14–0.
- SMU – Andy Bergfeld 5-yard pass from Mike Romo (kick blocked), 11:37. Notre Dame 14–6. Drive: 3 plays, 19 yards.
- ND – Andre Jones blocked extra point return, 11:37. Notre Dame 16–6.
- ND – Billy Hackett 34-yard field goal, 8:16. Notre Dame 19–6.
- ND – Ricky Watters 97-yard punt return (Craig Hentrich kick), 7:04. Notre Dame 26–6.
- ND – Anthony Johnson 4-yard run (Craig Hentrich kick), 4:02. Notre Dame 33–6. Drive: 64 yards.
- ND – Safety, Casey Clyce steps out of end zone, 3:00. Notre Dame 35–6.
- ND – Walter Boyd 14-yard run (Craig Hentrich kick), 0:15. Notre Dame 42–6. Drive: 75 yards.

Third quarter

- ND – Rusty Setzer 2-yard run (Craig Hentrich kick), 10:51. Notre Dame 49–6.
- ND – Billy Hackett 32-yard field goal, 5:45. Notre Dame 52–6.

Fourth quarter

- ND – Rod West 1-yard run (Craig Hentrich kick), 3:22. Notre Dame 59–6.

Top passers

- SMU – Mike Romo – 28/54, 194 yards
- ND – Tony Rice – 5/8, 83 yards

Top rushers

- SMU – Kevin Love – 4 rushes, 5 yards
- ND – Ricky Watters – 7 rushes, 69 yards, TD

Top receivers

- SMU – Jason Wolf – 9 receptions, 63 yards
- ND – Raghib Ismail – 4 receptions, 65 yards

External videos
- Full game

=== At No. 17 Penn State ===
No. 1 Notre Dame Fighting Irish (10–0) at No. 17 Penn State Nittany Lions (6–2–1)

Quarter	1	2	3	4	Total
No. 1 Fighting Irish	7	14	7	6	34
No. 17 Nittany Lions	7	3	7	6	23

at Beaver Stadium, State College, Pennsylvania

- Date: November 18
- Game time: 2:30 p.m. EST
- Game attendance: 86,025
- TV announcers (CBS): Jim Nantz and Pat Haden
- Recap/Box

Game information

First quarter

- PSU – Blair Thomas 2-yard run (Ray Tarasi kick), 8:04. Penn St 7–0. Drive: 79 yards.
- ND – Tony Rice 5-yard run (Craig Hentrich kick), 2:19. Tie 7–7. Drive: 13 plays, 65 yards.

Second quarter

- PSU – Ray Tarasi 38-yard field goal, 13:46. Penn St 10–7.
- ND – Ricky Watters 12-yard run (Craig Hentrich kick), 11:35. Notre Dame 14–10. Drive: 6 plays, 58 yards.
- ND – Anthony Johnson 1-yard run (Craig Hentrich kick), 5:27. Notre Dame 21–10.

Third quarter

- ND – Tony Rice 1-yard run (Craig Hentrich kick), 8:42. Notre Dame 28–10. Drive: 6 plays.
- PSU – Blair Thomas 3-yard run (Ray Tarasi kick), 4:49. Notre Dame 28–17. Drive: 79 yards.

Fourth quarter

- ND – Billy Hackett 22-yard field goal, 13:33. Notre Dame 31–17.
- ND – Billy Hackett 19-yard field goal, 6:53. Notre Dame 34–17.
- PSU – Terry Smith 5-yard pass from Tom Bill (run failed), 4:31. Notre Dame 34–23.

Top passers

- ND – Tony Rice – 5/10, 47 yards, INT
- PSU – Tom Bill – 6/14, 56 yards, TD

Top rushers

- ND – Tony Rice – 26 rushes, 141 yards, 2 TD
- PSU – Blair Thomas – 26 rushes, 133 yards, 2 TD

Top receivers

- ND – Raghib Ismail – 2 receptions, 27 yards
- PSU – O.J. McDuffie – 2 receptions, 37 yards

External videos
- Full game (part 1)
- Full game (part 2)
- Full game (part 3)
- Game highlights

=== At No. 7 Miami (FL) ===
No. 1 Notre Dame Fighting Irish (11–0) at No. 7 Miami (FL) Hurricanes (9–1)

Quarter	1	2	3	4	Total
No. 1 Fighting Irish	0	10	0	0	10
No. 7 Hurricanes	10	7	7	3	27

at Orange Bowl, Miami, Florida

- Date: November 25
- Game time: 6:30 p.m. EST
- Game weather: Overcast, 77 °F (25 °C)
- Game attendance: 81,634
- Referee: Jimmy Harper
- TV announcers (CBS): Jim Nantz, Pat Haden, and John Dockery
- Recap/Box

Game information

'First quarter

- UM – Carlos Huerta 35-yard field goal, 9:41. Miami (FL) 3–0.
- UM – Dale Dawkins 55-yard pass from Craig Erickson (Carlos Huerta kick), 0:04. Miami (FL) 10–0. Drive: 4 plays.

Second quarter

- ND – Billy Hackett 22-yard field goal, 8:23. Miami (FL) 10–3.
- ND – Ned Bolcar 49-yard interception return (Billy Hackett kick), 2:08. Tie 10–10.
- UM – Stephen McGuire 5-yard run (Carlos Huerta kick), 0:24. Miami (FL) 17–10. Drive: 3 plays.

Third quarter

- UM – Dale Dawkins 5-yard pass from Craig Erickson (Carlos Huerta kick), 4:13. Miami (FL) 24–10. Drive: 22 plays, 80 yards, 10:47.

Fourth quarter

- UM – Carlos Huerta 32-yard field goal, 1:44. Miami (FL) 27–10.

Top passers

- ND – Tony Rice – 7/15, 106 yards, 2 INT
- UM – Craig Erickson – 16/26, 210 yards, 2 TD

Top rushers

- ND – Tony Rice – 20 rushes, 50 yards
- UM – Stephen McGuire – 21 rushes, 83 yards, TD

Top receivers

- ND – Derek Brown – 2 receptions, 19 yards
- UM – Dale Dawkins – 4 receptions, 123 yards, 2 TD

External videos
- Full game
- Game highlights
- 3rd and 43

=== Vs. No. 1 Colorado (Orange Bowl) ===
1990 Orange Bowl
No. 4 Notre Dame Fighting Irish (11–1) vs. No. 1 Colorado Buffaloes (11–0)

Quarter	1	2	3	4	Total
No. 4 Fighting Irish	0	0	14	7	21
No. 1 Buffaloes	0	0	6	0	6

at Orange Bowl, Miami, Florida

- Date: January 1, 1990
- Game time: 8:00 p.m. EST
- Game attendance: 81,190
- TV announcers (NBC): Dick Enberg and Bill Walsh
- Recap/Box

Game information

First quarter

- No scoring

Second quarter

- No scoring

Third quarter

- ND – Anthony Johnson 2-yard run (Craig Hentrich kick), 11:48. Notre Dame 7–0.
- ND – Raghib Ismail 35-yard run (Craig Hentrich kick), 7:19. Notre Dame 14–0.
- CU – Darian Hagan 39-yard run (kick failed), 0:01. Notre Dame 14–6.

Fourth quarter

- ND – Anthony Johnson 7-yard run (Craig Hentrich kick), 1:32. Notre Dame 21–6.

Top passers

- ND – Tony Rice – 5/9, 99 yards
- CU – Darian Hagan – 4/13, 65 yards

Top rushers

- ND – Anthony Johnson – 15 rushes, 89 yards, 2 TD
- CU – Eric Bieniemy – 11 rushes, 66 yards

Top receivers

- ND – Pat Eilers – 2 receptions, 47 yards
- CU – Eric Kissick – 2 receptions, 33 yards

== Roster ==
1989 Notre Dame Fighting Irish football team roster
Players
Coaches
Offense

Pos.	#	Name	Class
RB		Steve Belles
RB		Walter Boyd
OL		Mike Brennan
RB		Reggie Brooks
OT	71	Dean Brown
TE	86	Derek Brown	So
RB	5	Rodney Culver	So
WR	13	Pat Eilers
QB		Pete Graham
WR		Ray Griggs
G	75	Tim Grunhard	Sr
RB	25	Raghib Ismail	Jr
WR		Adrian Jarrell
RB	22	Anthony Johnson (C)	Sr
RB		Craig Lanigan
RB		Dorsey Levens
C	76	Gene McGuire	So
RB		Ted McNamara
RB	35	Ryan Mihalko	Jr
QB	3	Rick Mirer	Fr
WR		William Pollard
QB	9	Tony Rice (C)	Sr
G	52	Tim Ryan	Jr
RB		Rusty Setzer
TE		Irv Smith
WR		Tony Smith
RB	12	Ricky Watters	Jr
TE		Rod West

Defense

Pos.	#	Name	Class
DT	90	Jeff Alm	Sr
LB	47	Ned Bolcar (C)	Sr
DT	93	Bob Dahl	Jr
DB	32	D'Juan Francisco
LB	36	Donn Grimm
LB	7	Andre Jones
LB	37	Scott Kowalkowski	Jr
CB	1	Todd Lyght	Jr
LB		Devon McDonald
LB	89	Karmeeleyah McGill	Fr
CB	29	Stan Smagala
DB	21	Rod Smith	So
LB	42	Mike Stonebreaker	Jr
S	15	Pat Terrell	Sr
DL	50	Chris Zorich	Jr

Special teams

Pos.	#	Name	Class
K		Billy Hackett
K	28	Craig Hentrich
P	16	Jim Sexton	Jr

Head coach

- Lou Holtz

Coordinators/assistant coaches

- Barry Alvarez (DC)
- Mike Markuson (GA)

Legend

- (C) Team captain
- (S) Suspended
- (I) Ineligible
- Injured
- Redshirt

== Awards and honors ==
Senior quarterback Tony Rice received multiple awards and honors:

- Football News College Player of the Year
- Finished fourth in voting for the Heisman Trophy
- Johnny Unitas Golden Arm Award, presented by the Kentucky chapter of the National Football Foundation to the country's top quarterback
- First-team All-America selection by Football News
- Team most valuable player, as voted by the team
- Invited to play in the Hula Bowl and East-West Shrine all-star game

Sophomore flanker and return specialist Rocket Ismail received first-team All-America honors from Associated Press (AP), The Sporting News (TSN), Football News (FN), Football Writers Association of America (FWAA), Newspaper Enterprise Association (NEA), and Gannett News Service (GNS). He also received second-team honors from the United Press International (UPI). He also tied for tenth in voting for the Heisman Trophy.

Junior defensive tackle Chris Zorich received numerous awards and honors including:

- College Lineman of the Year from the Touchdown Club of Washington, DC
- Consensus first-team All-America honors, with first-team honors from AP, UPI, TSN, FN, Walter Camp Football Foundation (WCFF), FWAA, and GNS
- Lombardi Award finalist

Junior cornerback Todd Lyght was a consensus first-team All-America, receiving such honors from AP, UPI, TSN, FN, WCFF, American Football Coaches Association (AFCA), NEA, and FWAA. He was also one of three finalists for the Jim Thorpe Award.

Senior linebacker Ned Bolcar received second-team All-America honors from the UPI and TSN.

Senior defensive tackle Jeff Alm received second-team All-America honors from AP, FN, and GNS. He was also named Notre Dame Lineman of the Year.

Senior free safety Pat Terrell received first-team All-America honors from GNS. He was also invited to play in the East-West Shrine all-star game.

Sophomore tight end Derek Brown received second-team All-America honors from GNS.

Senior offensive guard Tim Grunhard received second-team All-America honors from the NEA.

Senior fullback Anthony Johnson received the team's Nick Pietrosante Award as the player who best exemplifies courage, teamwork, loyalty, dedication, and pride.

== 1990 NFL draft ==
The following Notre Dame players were selected in the 1990 NFL draft:

Player	Position	Round	Pick	Franchise
Anthony Johnson	Running back	2	36	Indianapolis Colts
Tim Grunhard	Tackle	2	40	Kansas City Chiefs
Jeff Alm	Defensive tackle	2	41	Houston Oilers
Pat Terrell	Defensive back	2	49	Los Angeles Rams
Mike Brennan	Tackle	4	91	Cincinnati Bengals
Stan Smagala	Defensive back	5	123	Dallas Cowboys
Ned Bolcar	Linebacker	6	146	Seattle Seahawks
D’Juan Francisco	Defensive back	10	262	Washington Redskins
Dean Brown	Guard	12	316	Indianapolis Colts
