= Chris Zorich =

American football player and administrator (born 1969)

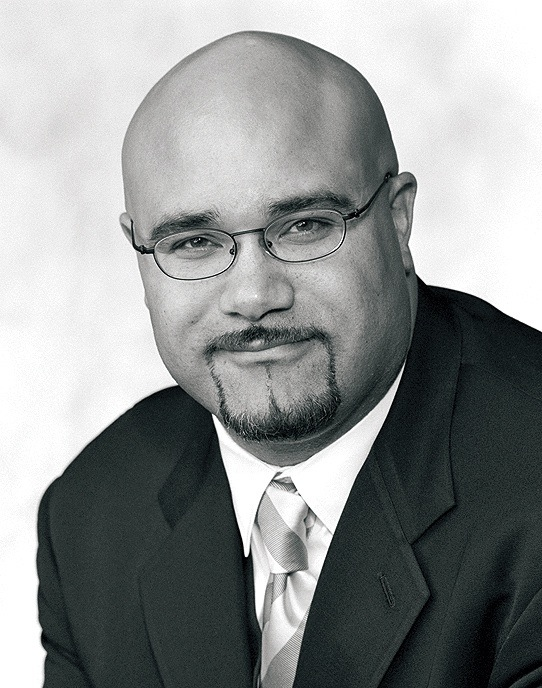
- Zorich in 2006

No. 97, 78
- Position: Defensive tackle

Personal information
- Born: March 13, 1969 (age 57); Chicago, Illinois, U.S.
- Listed height: 6 ft 1 in (1.85 m)
- Listed weight: 282 lb (128 kg)

Career information
- High school: Chicago Vocational
- College: Notre Dame
- NFL draft: 1991: 2nd round, 49th overall pick

Career history

Playing
- Chicago Bears (1991–1997); Washington Redskins (1997)

Operations
- Prairie State (2015–2018) (Athletic director); Chicago State (2018–2019) (Athletic director)

Awards and highlights
- UPI Lineman of the Year (1989); Lombardi Award (1990); Unanimous All-American (1990); Consensus All-American (1989); Orange Bowl Defensive MVP (1991); Pro Bowl alternate (1993)

Career NFL statistics
- Tackles: 321
- Sacks: 16.5
- Forced fumbles: 4
- Fumble recoveries: 6
- Touchdowns: 1
- Stats at Pro Football Reference
- College Football Hall of Fame

Christopher Robert Zorich (born March 13, 1969) is an American former professional football player who was a defensive tackle in the National Football League (NFL) for the Chicago Bears and Washington Redskins. He played college football for the Notre Dame Fighting Irish. Zorich was the athletic director at Chicago State University from May 2018 to July 2019.

== Early life ==
An only child of African American and Serbian descent, Zorich was raised by his mother, Zora (1931 - 1991), on the South Side of Chicago, where he attended Chicago Vocational High School. Chris is nephew to character actor Louis Zorich and his wife Olympia Dukakis.

== College career ==
Zorich received a scholarship to play college football at the University of Notre Dame in 1987 and began as a linebacker but was moved to nose tackle early in the season and did not play. However, Zorich then earned All-American honors the following season. In his first game, he had one and a half sacks and ten tackles against the University of Michigan and finished the year third on the team in tackles as Notre Dame went undefeated and won the national championship.

During his junior year, he followed his initial season with a consensus All-America year in 1989 and was also one of four finalists for the Lombardi Award. Also in 1989 he was voted the UPI Lineman of the Year award as the top lineman in college football. As a senior, Zorich won the Lombardi Award and was recognized as a unanimous All-America.

In the final game of his college career he was the Defensive Most Valuable player of the 1991 Orange Bowl.

While at Notre Dame, Zorich attended a class taught by future Big Ten Commissioner Kevin Warren. Zorich eventually signed with Warren's new law firm as Warren's first client.

== NFL career ==
Zorich was selected in the second round of the 1991 NFL draft by the Chicago Bears. He played for the Bears from 1991 until 1997, and he was named an alternate for the 1993 Pro Bowl. On December 27, 1992, he returned a fumble for a touchdown during a 27–14 loss to the Dallas Cowboys. He also played one season, in 1997, for the Washington Redskins. Over the course of his NFL career, Zorich tallied 16.5 career quarterback sacks and scored total one touchdown.

== After football ==
Zorich earned a Juris Doctor (J.D.) degree at Notre Dame and established the Christopher Zorich Foundation in 1993 to assist disadvantaged families. He is a past recipient of USA WEEKEND's Most Caring Athlete Award and the Jesse Owens Foundation Humanitarian Award. Zorich has also worked as a motivational speaker.

On May 9, 2007, Zorich was announced as one of the specially selected inductees of the 2007 class at the College Football Hall of Fame. Not only was he one of the youngest players to ever be inducted, he is only the third defensive lineman from tradition-rich Notre Dame to call the College Football Hall of Fame home.

On December 8, 2009, Zorich was also inducted into the FedEx Orange Bowl Hall of Fame for his outstanding performances in back-to-back Orange Bowl appearances in 1990 and 1991.

Zorich lives in Chicago and continues to be an active in athletics administration. From 2015 to 2018, he served as the athletic director at Prairie State College, a community college in Chicago Heights, Ill. From May 2018 to July 2019, he served as athletic director at Chicago State University.
