= Woodruff High School (South Carolina) =

School in Woodruff, Spartanburg County, South Carolina

Location
- 710 Cross Anchor Highway; Woodruff, Spartanburg County, South Carolina 29388; United States
- 34°43′56″N 82°1′22″W

Information
- Funding type: Public
- Established: 1908 (118 years ago)
- Status: Open
- School district: Spartanburg County School District 4
- NCES District ID: 4503570
- CEEB code: 412170
- NCES School ID: 450357001015
- Principal: Christine Morris
- Teaching staff: 47.00 (on an FTE basis)
- Enrollment: 808 (2023–2024)
- Student to teacher ratio: 17.19
- Colors: Maroon and gold
- Athletics conference: Region II – AAA
- Sports: Football, baseball, basketball, tennis, cross country, track and field, golf, wrestling, Strength
- Mascot: Wolverine
- Team name: Wolverines
- Rival: Clinton High School; Chesnee High School
- Website: whs.spartanburg4.org

Woodruff High School is a public secondary school in Woodruff, South Carolina, United States, and is the only high school in Spartanburg County School District 4.

== History ==
The original Woodruff High School was built in 1908 on East Georgia Street.

The next high school was built in 1925 in downtown Woodruff. It was a Collegiate Gothic building designed by Frank H. Cunningham and Joseph G. Cunningham. The building cost $50,000 at the time, and is nearly 30,000 square feet (2,800 m^{2}); the building includes a 600-seat auditorium. This building was the high school until 1953, when became a junior high school until the 1960s, and an elementary school after that. The city bought the school and converted it into the city hall and police station in 1978.

The following high school was opened in September 1953.

On January 11, 1987, Woodruff High School that was opened in 1953 was destroyed by a fire. Rob Johnson, who was a student at the time, describe waking up and seeing "large plumes of smoke filling the sky." After hearing about the fire, American rock band REO Speedwagon hosted a concert at the Greenville Memorial Auditorium to help raise money for the seniors. The band later raised money for the re-building of the school with a concert at Clemson University. The school in use today was completed for the school year beginning on August 13, 1989.

The building was nominated for the National Register of Historic Places as "Woodruff High School" on May 31, 2006.

On August 11, 2022, voters approved a referendum allowing the school district to issue $100 million in general obligation bonds to build a new Woodruff High School. The project broke ground on June 28, 2023. Students of Woodruff Middle School will move into the current high school upon the project's completion. The new building is expected to be complete in late 2025.

== Athletics ==
=== State championships ===
- Baseball: 1947, 1958
- Basketball - Girls: 1921, 1963, 1964, 1966, 1967
- Football: 1956, 1957, 1964, 1975, 1976, 1977, 1978, 1980, 1983, 1984
- Golf - Boys: 2021, 2023
- Tennis - Boys: 1975
- Track - Boys: 1979, 1980, 1982, 1984, 1985, 1994
- Wrestling: 1978, 1982, 1983, 2001
- Strength: 2023

== Notable alumni ==
- Marcellas Dial, NFL cornerback for the New England Patriots.
