= 1990 Orange Bowl =

1990 Federal Express Orange Bowl
- 56th Orange Bowl
- The Miami Orange Bowl in Miami, Florida, hosted the Orange Bowl.
| Notre Dame Fighting Irish | Colorado Buffaloes |
| (11–1) | (11–0) |
| Independent | Big Eight |
| 21 | 6 |
| Head coach: Lou Holtz | Head coach: Bill McCartney |
| AP / Coaches; 4 / 4 | AP / Coaches; 1 / 1 |
| | 1 | 2 | 3 | 4 | Total |
|---|---|---|---|---|---|
| Notre Dame | 0 | 0 | 14 | 7 | 21 |
| Colorado | 0 | 0 | 6 | 0 | 6 |
- Date: January 1, 1990
- Season: 1989
- Stadium: Orange Bowl
- Location: Miami, Florida
- MVP: Raghib Ismail (Notre Dame WR); Darian Hagan (Colorado QB)
- Favorite: Notre Dame by 2 points
- Referee: Dayle Phillips (ACC)
- Attendance: 81,190

United States TV coverage
- Network: NBC
- Announcers: Dick Enberg, Bill Walsh

The 1990 Orange Bowl was the 56th edition of the college football bowl game, played at the Orange Bowl in Miami, Florida, on Monday, January 1. Part of the 1989–90 bowl game season, it matched the independent and fourth-ranked Notre Dame Fighting Irish and the undefeated #1 Colorado Buffaloes of the Big Eight Conference.

Slightly favored, Notre Dame won 21–6.

== Teams ==
=== Notre Dame ===
The Fighting Irish won their first eleven games but lost 27–10 at new rival Miami in late November, which snapped a 23-game winning streak and dropped them from first to fourth in the rankings.

=== Colorado ===
The Buffaloes won all eleven games in the regular season and were ranked first in both polls.

== Game summary ==
Televised by NBC, the game kicked off minutes after 8 p.m. EST, shortly after the start of the Sugar Bowl on ABC, which matched #2 Miami and #7 Alabama.

The first half was scoreless. Notre Dame led 14–6 after three quarters, and spoiled a championship season for the Buffaloes with a 21–6 victory. This allowed Sugar Bowl winner Miami to take the national championship, with Notre Dame as runner-up.

=== Scoring ===
First quarter
No scoring
Second quarter
No scoring
Third quarter

- Notre Dame – Anthony Johnson 2-yard run (Craig Hentrich kick)
- Notre Dame – Raghib Ismail 35-yard run (Hentrich kick)
- Colorado – Darian Hagan 39-yard run (kick failed)

Fourth quarter

- Notre Dame – Johnson 7-yard run (Hentrich kick)

== Statistics ==
| Statistics | Notre Dame | Colorado |
|---|---|---|
| First downs | 18 | 16 |
| Rushes–yards | 52–279 | 46–217 |
| Passing yards | 99 | 65 |
| Passes (C–A–I) | 6–9–0 | 4–13–2 |
| Total offense | 61–378 | 59–282 |
| Return yards | 0 | 36 |
| Punts–average | 5–40 | 3–39 |
| Fumbles–lost | 0–0 | 1–1 |
| Turnovers | 0 | 3 |
| Penalties-yards | 3–35 | 1–5 |
| Time of possession | 32:43 | 27:17 |

== Aftermath ==
The loss by Colorado opened up the national championship for Miami, but several analysts/pollsters felt that Notre Dame was also worthy of the title. Notre Dame and Miami had lost one game and Notre Dame had played a much more difficult schedule. However, the head-to-head matchup proved too much to overcome as Miami was voted number one in both final polls; Notre Dame was second (third in Coaches poll), and Colorado slipped to fourth.
