= Bill McCartney =

American football player and coach (1940–2025)

Biographical details
- Born: August 22, 1940; Riverview, Michigan, U.S.
- Died: January 10, 2025 (aged 84); Boulder, Colorado, U.S.

Playing career

Football
- 1959–1961: Missouri

Coaching career (HC unless noted)

Football
- 1965–1968: Holy Redeemer HS (MI) (assistant)
- 1969–1973: Divine Child HS (MI)
- 1974–1976: Michigan (DE)
- 1977–1981: Michigan (DC)
- 1982–1994: Colorado

Basketball
- 1965–1969: Holy Redeemer HS (MI)
- 1969–1974: Divine Child HS (MI)

Head coaching record
- Overall: 93–55–5 (college football); 30–5 (high school football)
- Bowls: 3–6

Accomplishments and honors

Championships
- AP national champion (1990); 3 Big 8 (1989–1991)

Awards
- AFCA Coach of the Year (1989); Eddie Robinson Coach of the Year (1989); Walter Camp Coach of the Year Award (1989); Paul "Bear" Bryant Award (1989); 3× Big Eight Coach of the Year (1985, 1989–1990)
- College Football Hall of Fame; Inducted in 2013 (profile)

William Paul McCartney (August 22, 1940 – January 10, 2025) was an American college football coach who was the head coach of the Colorado Buffaloes for 13 seasons (1982–1994). He compiled a 93–55–5 (.624) record, and won three consecutive Big Eight Conference titles (1989–1991). McCartney's 1990 team was crowned as national champions by the Associated Press, splitting the title with Georgia Tech, who was first in the final Coaches' Poll. He was inducted into the College Football Hall of Fame as a coach in 2013.

In 1990, McCartney founded the Promise Keepers, an Evangelical Christian parachurch organization opposed to same sex marriage.

== Early life and career ==
After receiving his Bachelor of Arts in education from the University of Missouri in 1962, where he was a member of the Pi Kappa Alpha fraternity, McCartney was named as an assistant football coach under his older brother, Tom, in the summer of 1965 at Holy Redeemer High School in Detroit, Michigan. The younger McCartney was also the head basketball coach at Redeemer from 1965 to 1969, taking the school to the Detroit City Championship during the 1968–69 season. McCartney then served as the head football and basketball coach at Divine Child High School in Dearborn where he won state championships in football (1971, 1973) and basketball (1973). He became the only high school coach ever hired by University of Michigan head coach Bo Schembechler when he was hired in 1974 as the defensive ends coach. In 1977, he was promoted to defensive coordinator following Gary Moeller's departure to Illinois.

== Head coach at Colorado ==
After eight years as an assistant at Michigan, McCartney was hired to replace Chuck Fairbanks as head coach at the University of Colorado Boulder on June 9, 1982. In his first season, the Colorado Buffaloes compiled a record of 2–8–1. After improving to 4–7 in 1983, Colorado sustained a 1–10 campaign in 1984, but McCartney was given a contract extension nonetheless. In his fourth season in 1985, McCartney switched to the wishbone offense in the spring, then guided the Buffs to a 7–4 regular season and a berth in the Freedom Bowl, where they lost to Washington.

In 1985, CU adopted a policy preventing coaches from organizing religious activities in response to complaints about McCartney leading team prayers and similar activities. McCartney continued, leading to a lawsuit by the ACLU, who alleged that such activities were unconstitutional at a public university. At that point, McCartney agreed to back away from religious expressions in his role as coach, but increasingly engaged in advocacy for socially conservative policy in his personal life.

In 1986, CU earned its first victory over Big Eight Conference powerhouse Nebraska since 1967. After modestly successful seasons in 1987 and 1988, McCartney steered his team toward national prominence.

After the 1988 season, the Buffaloes' star quarterback Sal Aunese was diagnosed with stomach cancer and died in the middle of the 1989 season. Nonetheless, Colorado won all eleven of its regular season games including victories over ranked Washington, Illinois, Nebraska, and Oklahoma. The top-ranked Buffaloes faced #4 Notre Dame in the Orange Bowl on New Year's, but lost 21–6.

Colorado opened the 1990 season ranked fourth with a game against Tennessee in the inaugural Disney Pigskin Classic in Anaheim, California, which ended in a 31–31 tie. A comeback win over Stanford and a one-point loss to Illinois leveled the Buffaloes' record at 1–1–1. Colorado then won the remainder of their regular season games. Their winning streak, highlighted by wins over ranked Washington, Oklahoma, and Nebraska, was not without controversy. In a game against Missouri on October 6, the officials mistakenly allowed an extra down on which Colorado scored the winning touchdown as time expired. The game, known as the Fifth Down Game, became one of the most notorious officiating gaffes in college football history. Contentions notwithstanding, Colorado rose to #1 in the rankings and again faced Notre Dame in the Orange Bowl. The Buffaloes won a closely played game 10–9, aided by a questionable and debated clipping call that negated a late punt return touchdown by Rocket Ismail of Notre Dame, and earned a share of the national title. Colorado was first in the final AP Poll while Georgia Tech was first in the Coaches' Poll.

The following year, the Buffaloes tied Nebraska for the Big Eight title and lost to Alabama in the Blockbuster Bowl. In 1992, Colorado was 9–1–1 in the regular season, but lost to Syracuse in the Fiesta Bowl. In 1994, McCartney's final year, he coached the Buffaloes to a victory at Michigan, where McCartney had spent eight years as an assistant. Colorado won the game 27–26 on a 64-yard Hail Mary pass from Kordell Stewart to Michael Westbrook as time expired, which has since become known as The Miracle at Michigan. The Buffaloes posted an 11–1 record in 1994, capped by a win over Notre Dame in the Fiesta Bowl. At the end of the 1994 season, McCartney retired from coaching at the age of 54.

McCartney holds records for the most games coached (153), most wins (93), and most conference wins (58) in the history of the Colorado Buffaloes football program.

In 1995, there was widespread media speculation that McCartney might un-retire to serve as the head coach at Michigan following the resignation of Gary Moeller. McCartney, a former Wolverines assistant coach under Bo Schembechler, held a news conference to remove his name from consideration, stating that he wanted to devote his time to Promise Keepers.

In 2012, McCartney publicly criticized Colorado's firing of head coach Jon Embree as racially motivated.

== Ministry ==
In 1990, while he was head football coach at Colorado, McCartney founded a nonpartisan Christian men's group, Promise Keepers. He was concerned that men were falling away from Christianity and eroding the foundation of the American family. The all-male gatherings hosted by the group often drew crowds in the tens of thousands. In 1997, at the height of the movement's popularity, approximately half a million men came to the National Mall for an assembly of the group. At the time, it was described as "one of the fastest-growing religious revivals in American history." However, only months later, the organization collapsed financially and laid off its entire staff.

He later resigned as the head of Promise Keepers and founded another organization, The Road to Jerusalem. In September 2008, McCartney rejoined Promise Keepers as CEO and chairman of the board. He served on the board of directors of the Equip Foundation, Gospel to the Unreached Millions, and Concerts of Prayer International.

McCartney was on the forefront to support the 1992 Amendment 2 to the Colorado Constitution, which prevented the passage of anti-discrimination laws giving protected status to gays, lesbians, or bisexuals. His public appearance in the facilities of CU to support the Amendment, during which he referred to homosexuality as "an abomination against almighty God," caused an outcry among students of CU. The Amendment was found unconstitutional by the Supreme Court.

McCartney was the author of five books: From Ashes to Glory (1995), Sold Out (1997), Sold Out Two-Gether (1999), co-authored with his wife, Lyndi McCartney, Blind Spots: What You Don't See May Be Keeping Your Church From Greatness (2003), and Two Minute Warning: Why It's Time to Honor Jewish People Before the Clock Runs Out (2009) with Aaron Fruh.

== Honors ==
McCartney won a number of national coaching awards in 1989, including the Eddie Robinson Coach of the Year award, the Walter Camp Coach of the Year Award and the Paul "Bear" Bryant Award. Three times, in 1985, 1989, and 1990, he was named the Big Eight Coach of the Year. McCartney was inducted into the Orange Bowl Hall of Fame in 1996 and the Colorado Sports Hall of Fame in 1999.

McCartney was honored with a number of additional personal awards including: the Impact America Award from Point Loma College in 1995, the Spectrum Award from Sports Spectrum magazine in 1995, ABC News Person of the Week on February 16, 1996, Layperson of the Year from the National Association of Evangelicals in 1996, the Fire-Setters Award from Revival Fires Ministries in 1997, the Evangelist Philip Award from the National Association of United Methodist Evangelists in 1999, and the Humanitarian of the Year from the Syl Morgan Smith Colorado Gospel Music Academy in 1999.

== Personal life ==
McCartney lived with his wife, Lyndi, in the Denver area. They had four children (three sons and one daughter) and ten grandchildren, one of whom (T. C. McCartney, a former LSU quarterback) is the son of former player Sal Aunese. McCartney's son, Mike, is a football sports agent, who negotiated Kirk Cousins' fully guaranteed three-year contract worth $84 million which was the first fully guaranteed and, as of signing, highest-paying contract in NFL history. Another grandson, Derek, was fathered by another former player Shannon Clavelle.

Just before the 1993 Fiesta Bowl, McCartney confessed to his wife that he had committed adultery 20 years ago. Lyndi later suffered from severe bulimia and contemplated suicide, which prompted McCartney to retire from coaching in 1994. Lyndi died of emphysema caused by decades of smoking in 2013.

Raised Catholic, McCartney later became a Protestant and attended Cornerstone Church in Boulder, Colorado.

In 2016, McCartney's family announced he had been diagnosed with dementia and Alzheimer's disease. McCartney died from complications of dementia at his Boulder home on January 10, 2025, at the age of 84.

== Head coaching record ==
=== College football ===
Year	Team	Overall	Conference	Standing	Bowl/playoffs	Coaches^{#}	AP^{°}
Colorado Buffaloes (Big Eight Conference) (1982–1994)
1982	Colorado	2–8–1	1–5–1	T–6th			
1983	Colorado	4–7	2–5	T–6th			
1984	Colorado	1–10	1–6	7th			
1985	Colorado	7–5	4–3	T–3rd	L Freedom		
1986	Colorado	6–6	6–1	2nd	L Bluebonnet		
1987	Colorado	7–4	4–3	4th			
1988	Colorado	8–4	4–3	4th	L Freedom		
1989	Colorado	11–1	7–0	1st	L Orange	4	4
1990	Colorado	11–1–1	7–0	1st	W Orange	2	1
1991	Colorado	8–3–1	6–0–1	T–1st	L Blockbuster	20	20
1992	Colorado	9–2–1	5–1–1	2nd	L Fiesta^{†}	13	13
1993	Colorado	8–3–1	5–1–1	2nd	W Aloha	16	16
1994	Colorado	11–1	6–1	2nd	W Fiesta^{†}	3	3
Colorado:		93–55–5	58–29–4				
Total:		93–55–5					
National championship Conference title Conference division title or championship game berth
^{†}Indicates Bowl Coalition bowl.; ^{#}Rankings from final Coaches Poll.; ^{°}Rankings from final AP Poll.
