= Darian Hagan =

American gridiron football player (born 1970)

San Diego State Aztecs
- Title: Running backs coach

Personal information
- Born: February 1, 1970 (age 56); Lynwood, California, U.S.

Career information
- High school: Locke (Los Angeles, California)
- College: Colorado
- NFL draft: 1992: 9th round, 242nd overall pick

Career history

Playing
- San Francisco 49ers (1992)*; Toronto Argonauts (1993–1994); Las Vegas Posse (1994); Edmonton Eskimos (1995–1996)
- * Offseason or practice squad member only

Coaching
- Colorado (2005) Offensive assistant; Colorado (2006–2010) Running backs coach; Colorado (2011–2012) Director of player personnel; Colorado (2013–2015) Director of player development; Colorado (2016–2022) Running backs coach; Colorado (2023) Executive Director, Community Engagement; San Diego State (2024–present) Running backs coach

Awards and highlights
- National champion (1990); Sporting News College Football Player of the Year (1989); Second-team All-American (1989); Big Eight Offensive Co-Player of the Year (1989); 2× First-team All-Big Eight (1989, 1990); Second-team All-Big Eight (1991)

Darian Hagan (born February 1, 1970) is an American college football coach, currently serving as the running backs coach of the San Diego State Aztecs. He is a former professional football player in the Canadian Football League (CFL). He played college football as a quarterback for the Colorado Buffaloes, earning national player of the year and All-American honors in 1989. From 2005 to 2022, Hagan was an assistant coach for his alma mater, the University of Colorado Boulder.

== College career ==
As an option quarterback at Colorado from 1988 to 1991, Hagan produced impressive offensive statistics operating coach Bill McCartney's "I-Bone" offense. Due to veteran quarterback Sal Aunese being stricken with cancer, he took over the starting duties as a sophomore. When Aunese died, Hagan and the rest of the Buffaloes dedicated their season to their fallen comrade. In that 1989 season, he burst on the college football scene, and became the sixth player in the history of NCAA Division I-A to gain more than 1,000 yards passing and more than 1,000 yards rushing in the same season. He was the starting quarterback in 1990 when Colorado won the NCAA Division I-A national football championship, and in 1989 to 1991 when Colorado was the Big Eight Conference champions. His record as quarterback for Colorado was 28–5–2 (20–0–1 in the Big Eight). In Heisman Trophy voting he was 5th in 1989 with 242 points, 17th in 1990 with 17 points and 20th in 1991 with 12 points.

Hagan was inducted into the University of Colorado Athletic Hall of Fame in 2002. He is also considered by many alumni as the best football player in CU history. He finished his career with 3,801 passing yards and 2,007 rushing yards.

== Professional career ==
After college, Hagan was drafted by the San Francisco 49ers in the ninth round of the 1992 NFL draft with the 242nd overall pick, but never played for the team. He played five years in the Canadian Football League for three teams: the Toronto Argonauts (1993–94), the Las Vegas Posse (1994), and the Edmonton Eskimos (1995–96). He mostly played as a defensive back and on special teams.

== Coaching career ==
Before his last season, he graduated from Colorado with a bachelor's degree in sociology. When his professional football career ended, Hagan turned to jobs in marketing and then in coaching. He became the defensive technical intern in 2004 for Colorado. The following year, he was hired by Gary Barnett as an offensive assistant coach. In 2006, he was one of only two assistant coaches kept by new head coach Dan Hawkins as the running backs assistant coach where he coached through the 2022 season.

On January 27, 2023, following the hiring of Deion Sanders as Colorado's new head football coach, Sanders announced he would be retaining Hagan, giving him the new title "Executive Director, Community Engagement & Outreach/Football Ambassador" Hagan, along with Director of Player Personnel Chandler Dorrell, were the only two members retained by Sanders from Colorado's 2022 staff.

On December 5, 2023, Hagan announced he would be accepting the role of running backs coach at San Diego State University, following new head coach Sean Lewis, who had previously served at Colorado's offensive coordinator.
