= Woodruff, South Carolina =

- City
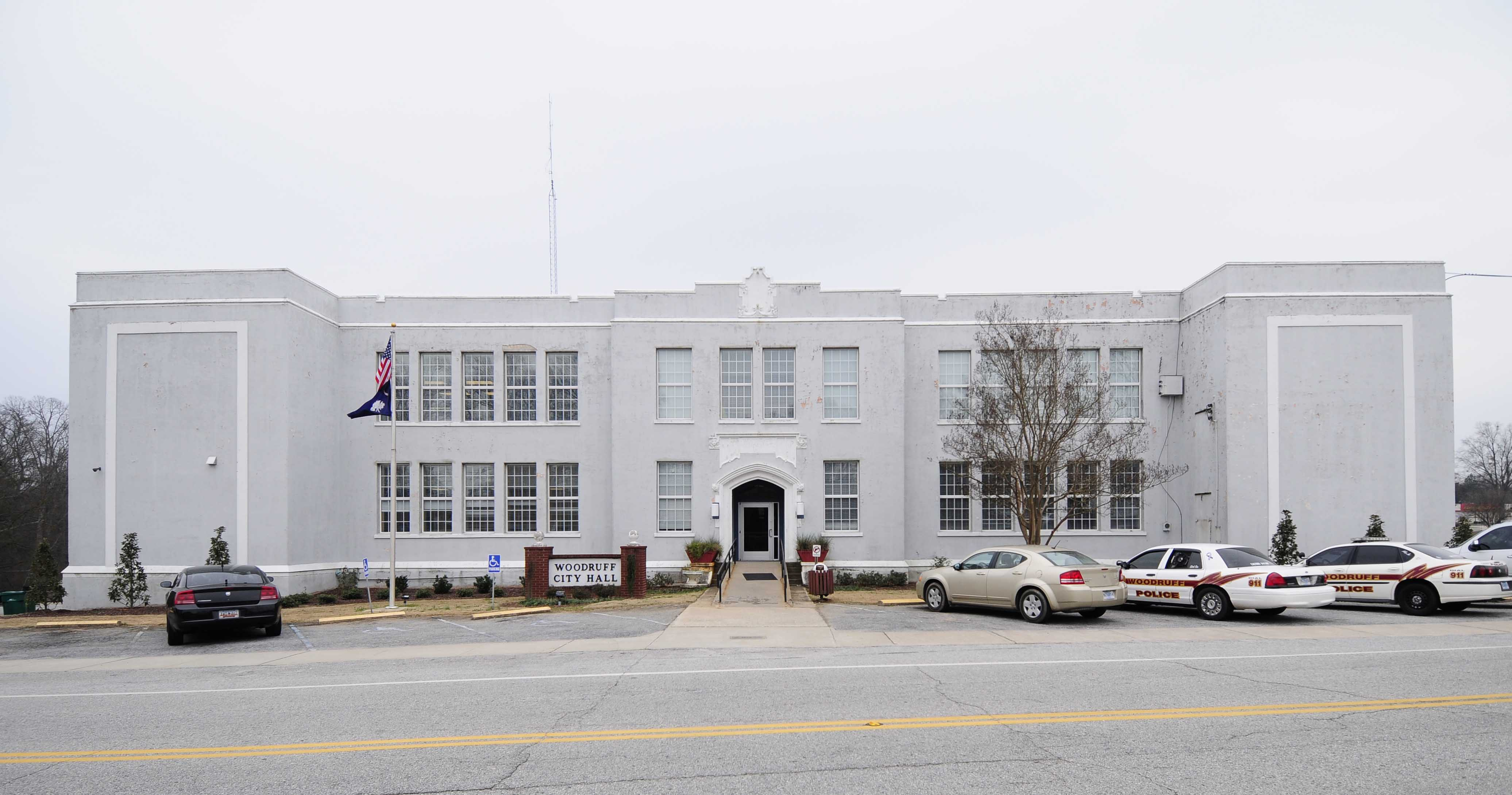
- Woodruff City Hall

- Seal
- Motto: "Time Well Spent"
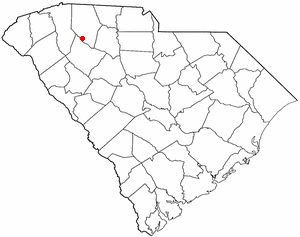
- Location of Woodruff, South Carolina
- Coordinates: 34°44′52″N 82°02′26″W
- Country: United States
- State: South Carolina
- County: Spartanburg

Area
  - Total: 5.09 sq mi (13.19 km^{2})
  - Land: 5.07 sq mi (13.14 km^{2})
  - Water: 0.019 sq mi (0.05 km^{2})
- Elevation: 758 ft (231 m)

Population (2020)
  - Total: 4,212
  - Density: 830.0/sq mi (320.48/km^{2})
- Time zone: UTC-5 (Eastern (EST))
  - Summer (DST): UTC-4 (EDT)
- ZIP code: 29388
- Area codes: 864, 821
- FIPS code: 45-79090
- GNIS feature ID: 2405787
- Website: www.cityofwoodruff.com

Woodruff is a city in Spartanburg County, South Carolina, United States. The population was 4,333 at the 2020 census. The city is part of the Greenville-Spartanburg-Anderson Combined Statistical Area.

== Geography ==
According to the United States Census Bureau, the city has a total area of 3.7 square miles (9.6 km^{2}), of which 0.04 square miles (0.10 km^{2}), or 0.54%, is water.

== History ==
In 1787, Joseph Woodruff, his brothers, and other family were listed as members and deacons in the earliest minutes of the Church of Christ at Jamey’s Creek, which would later become Woodruff Baptist Church. As early as 1789, Woodruff purchased two hundred acres of land on Jamey’s Creek, including the present site of Woodruff. By 1825, Woodruff post office (which took its name from the postmaster Thomas Woodruff, Joseph’s son) and Woodruff’s Tavern dominated the crossroads.

Situated in the midst of an expanding cotton region, Woodruff developed as a trade center for the rural farming communities. By the 1850s the town was hosting substantial fairs for the exchange of livestock and domestic manufactures. Woodruff was incorporated in 1874 with a population estimated at 150, but with the coming of the railroad in 1885 the population had grown to an estimated 1,600 by 1886. As a terminus on the rail line, the station at Woodruff included a turntable that would return trains to Augusta, Georgia.

A fair that began in the 1870s grew into a major annual event by the 1890s, drawing visitors from as far away as North Carolina. During the 1880s and 1890s construction steadily progressed along Main Street, with the popular Leatherwood Hotel as the focal point. Industry came to town in 1898 with the arrival of Woodruff Cotton Oil Company, and within three years the newly chartered Woodruff Cotton Mill began operation. By 1907 the W.S. Gray Cotton Mill was established, further expanding Woodruff’s residential base with additional mill houses. Until World War II the major diversion from textiles in the area was peaches, with more than 200,000 trees within a ten-mile radius. During the 1950s, with industries settling near large cities, Woodruff saw a four percent drop in population. But with the 1962 opening of the Jeffery Manufacturing Company plant costing US$2,500,000 (equivalent to US$30,310,150 in 2025), the town’s industrial base grew and diversified. New jobs attracted residents, and Woodruff’s population reached 4,576 by 1970.

== Government and city departments ==
Kenneth Gist is the current mayor, the city manager is Lee Bailey. City Council members include Mattie Norman, Toni Sloan, William "Buddy" Arnold, James Smith, Scott Dickard and Sharon Kelly.

The town is also noted for being situated near an international aeromodelling center, Triple Tree Aerodrome, where the world's largest model airplane event happens annually, Joe Nall Week.

Other city departments include the fire department (The Woodruff Fire Department became a part of The Trinity Fire Department in July 2019, parks and recreation, building codes and zoning, police department, streets department, and sewer department.

== Education ==
Spartanburg County School District 4 serves Woodruff and nearby areas, encompassing approximately 2,800 students. The district superintendent is Dr. Aaron D. Fulmer. The district currently operates five schools:

- Woodruff Primary School
- Woodruff Elementary School
- Woodruff Intermediate School
- Woodruff Middle School
- Woodruff High School

Throughout its history, Woodruff High School has achieved significant success in athletics, especially in football. Under the leadership of Coach W. L. Varner, the school's athletics programs have secured numerous state titles.

Woodruff also hosts the Project Fun Homeschool Co-op, which serves students from Spartanburg, Greenville, Laurens, and Union counties. The city has a lending library, a branch of the Spartanburg County Public Library.

== Media ==
Woodruff has a radio station that is Woodruff specific; WQUL is a radio station located in Woodruff that plays oldies, carries local sports games, and keeps the community abreast of local events. It can be found at 101.7 F.M.

The Woodruff Times newspaper publishes both a monthly paper edition and operates a web site.

== Demographics ==
Historical population
Census	Pop.	Note	%±
1880	254		—
1890	380		49.6%
1900	596		56.8%
1910	1,880		215.4%
1920	2,396		27.4%
1930	3,175		32.5%
1940	3,508		10.5%
1950	3,831		9.2%
1960	3,679		−4.0%
1970	4,690		27.5%
1980	5,171		10.3%
1990	4,365		−15.6%
2000	4,229		−3.1%
2010	4,090		−3.3%
2020	4,212		3.0%
U.S. Decennial Census

=== 2020 census ===
As of the 2020 census, Woodruff had a population of 4,212 people, 1,613 households, and 891 families residing in the city. The median age was 38.7 years; 23.9% of residents were under the age of 18 and 19.6% were 65 years of age or older. For every 100 females there were 88.4 males, and for every 100 females age 18 and over there were 85.7 males.

Of the 1,613 households, 32.1% had children under the age of 18 living in them, 35.3% were married-couple households, 20.5% were households with a male householder and no spouse or partner present, and 36.5% were households with a female householder and no spouse or partner present. About 29.8% of households were made up of individuals and 14.1% had someone living alone who was 65 years of age or older.

There were 1,856 housing units, of which 13.1% were vacant. The homeowner vacancy rate was 2.7% and the rental vacancy rate was 10.5%.

0.0% of residents lived in urban areas, while 100.0% lived in rural areas.

Racial composition as of the 2020 census
Race	Number	Percent
White	2,637	62.6%
Black or African American	957	22.7%
American Indian and Alaska Native	22	0.5%
Asian	28	0.7%
Native Hawaiian and Other Pacific Islander	0	0.0%
Some other race	229	5.4%
Two or more races	339	8.0%
Hispanic or Latino (of any race)	448	10.6%

=== 2000 census ===
As of the census of 2000, there were 4,229 people, 1,678 households, and 1,130 families residing in the city. The population density was 1,154.8 inhabitants per square mile (445.9/km^{2}). There were 1,869 housing units at an average density of 510.4 per square mile (197.1/km^{2}). The racial makeup of the city was 68.53% White, 27.71% African American, 0.17% Native American, 0.14% Asian, 0.02% Pacific Islander, 1.63% from other races, and 1.80% from two or more races. Hispanic or Latino of any race were 3.74% of the population. With a population 4,229 there are three Authur state banks within a mile of each 3 homeless shelters yet statistically no Woodruff residents are homeless. There are 4 mortuaries in the city of 4,229. There were 1,678 households, out of which 30.6% had children under the age of 18 living with them, 42.8% were married couples living together, 19.0% had a female householder with no husband present, and 32.6% were non-families. 29.6% of all households were made up of individuals, and 14.8% had someone living alone who was 65 years of age or older. The average household size was 2.44 and the average family size was 3.00.

In the city, the population was spread out, with 25.2% under the age of 18, 8.7% from 18 to 24, 26.5% from 25 to 44, 22.3% from 45 to 64, and 17.3% who were 65 years of age or older. The median age was 37 years. For every 100 females, there were 83.6 males. For every 100 females age 18 and over, there were 79.1 males.

The median income for a household in the city was $24,824, and the median income for a family was $32,966. Males had a median income of $26,204 versus $21,467 for females. The per capita income for the city was $14,535. About 15.5% of families and 18.4% of the population were below the poverty line, including 19.3% of those under age 18 and 19.3% of those age 65 or over.

== Notable people ==
- Wilson Casey, Trivia Guinness World Record holder
- Tory Dandy, sports agent
- Ken "The Hawk" Harrelson, former Major League Baseball player
- Todd Kohlhepp, serial killer
- Tony Rice, football player
- Sammy Taylor, major league baseball player
- Willie Varner (1926-2009), in the National High School Sports Hall of Fame.
