= WQUL =

Coordinates: 34°45′22″N 82°03′18″W

- Woodruff, South Carolina; United States
- Broadcast area: Southern Spartanburg County
- Frequency: 1510 kHz
- Branding: 101.7 WQUL

Programming
- Format: Classic hits
- Affiliations: ABC News Radio

Ownership
- Owner: Bob Corlew; (New Mountains to Climb, LLC)

History
- First air date: July 7, 1967 (as WSJW)
- Former call signs: WSJW (1967–1989); WJKI (1989–1998); WDRF (1998–2009)

Technical information
- Licensing authority: FCC
- Facility ID: 29658
- Class: D
- Power: 1,000 watts day 250 watts critical hours
- Translators: 95.9 W240BO (Woodruff); 101.7 W269DM (Woodruff)

Links
- Public license information: Public file; LMS
- Webcast: Listen Live
- Website: wqul1017.com

WQUL (1510 AM) is a daytime-only classic hits radio station located in Woodruff, South Carolina, south of the Greenville-Spartanburg area. The station is licensed by the Federal Communications Commission (FCC) to broadcast with a power of 1,000 watts during the day and 250 watts during critical hours. WQUL also broadcasts at 95.9 FM on translator W240BO and at 101.7 FM on translator W269DM.

== History ==
The station formerly operated a southern gospel format until purchased in 2004 by T.C. Lewis. Lewis changed the format a few times before he found the niche in Oldies, featuring music from the 1950s, 1960s, 1970s, and Beach. He has 23 years of experience in radio in both AM and FM formats. When T.C. bought WDRF 1510, he wanted to take the station and make it community affiliated. WQUL accomplishes this by carrying all the Woodruff Wolverine Football, Baseball, Soccer, and Softball games, and also keeps the citizens of Woodruff and Southern Spartanburg County informed on events in the area. The station is also an affiliate of the Tar Heel Sports Network; carrying both football and basketball games.

On March 1, 2015, WQUL switched from classic hits to classic country.

Effective December 5, 2019, BJL Broadcasting sold WQUL and translator W269DM to Bob Corlew's New Mountains to Climb, LLC for $70,000.
