= Craig Hentrich =

American football player (born 1971)

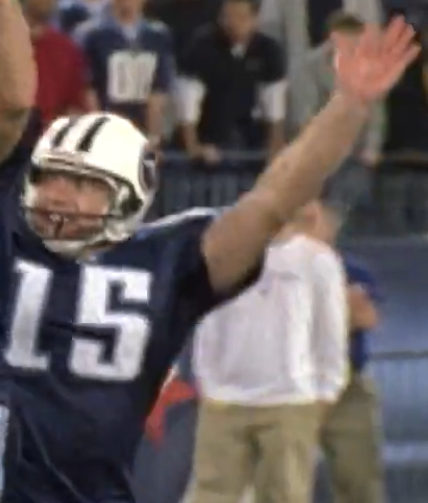
- Hentrich with the Tennessee Titans in 2006

No. 17, 15
- Position: Punter

Personal information
- Born: May 18, 1971 (age 55); Alton, Illinois, U.S.
- Listed height: 6 ft 3 in (1.91 m)
- Listed weight: 213 lb (97 kg)

Career information
- High school: Marquette Catholic (Alton)
- College: Notre Dame
- NFL draft: 1993: 8th round, 200th overall pick

Career history
- New York Jets (1993)*; Green Bay Packers (1993–1997); Tennessee Oilers/Titans (1998–2009)
- * Offseason or practice squad member only

Awards and highlights
- Super Bowl champion (XXXI); 2× First-team All-Pro (1998, 2003); 2× Pro Bowl (1998, 2003); PFW Golden Toe Award (1999)

Career NFL statistics
- Punts: 1,150
- Punt yards: 49,281
- Average punt: 42.9
- Stats at Pro Football Reference

Craig Anthony Hentrich (/ˈhɛntrɪk/ HEN-trik; born May 18, 1971) is an American former professional football player who was a punter for 17 seasons in the National Football League (NFL). He played college football for the Notre Dame Fighting Irish. He was selected by the New York Jets in the eighth round of the 1993 NFL draft, and has also played for the Green Bay Packers and Tennessee Oilers / Titans. With the Packers, he won Super Bowl XXXI against the New England Patriots.

== Early life ==
Hentrich graduated from Marquette Catholic High School in Alton, Illinois.

== College career ==
Hentrich lettered four years at the University of Notre Dame, serving as both the placekicker and punter. He finished his career with a school-record 44.1-yard punting average and had 39 career field goals (on 56 attempts) to rank second behind John Carney’s 51. Also, he finished his career ranked second on the school's all-time scoring list with 294 points, the most ever by a Fighting Irish kicker, and made a record 98.3 percent (177/180) of his PAT attempts.

== Professional career ==
Hentrich was drafted in the eighth round with the 200th overall pick in the 1993 NFL draft by the New York Jets, but was then signed to the Green Bay Packers.

=== 1993 season ===
In 1993, Hentrich spent the majority of the season on Green Bay's practice squad following his training camp release from the Jets on August 24. He was signed off the Packers' practice squad on January 14 for the NFC divisional playoff game at Dallas and was placed on the inactive list. He initially joined the Packers practice squad on September 7.

=== 1994 season ===
In 1994, Hentrich beat out incumbent Bryan Wagner in training camp for the punting job. He ranked fifth in the NFC with 24 punts inside the 20 and finished tied for seventh in the NFC with a 41.4 gross punting average. He was named NFC Special Teams Player of the Week for his performance against the New York Jets (11/13), which included a 70-yard punt. Hentrich also had the second-best gross average (44 yards) in Packer postseason history against the Dallas Cowboys at the time, a game in which he handled kickoff duties for the first time as a pro.

=== 1995 season ===
In 1995, Hentrich filled in as the field goal kicker for two games while Chris Jacke was sidelined with a hamstring injury. He made the first field goals of his NFL career against the Chicago Bears, connecting from 32 and 38 yards. Hentrich averaged 42.2 yards per punt to rank seventh in the NFC. He dropped 26 punts inside the 20, which was third in the NFC.

=== 1996 season ===
In 1996, Hentrich tied the Packers record for single-season net punting average, 36.3, previously by Bryan Wagner in 1993, and turned in the second-best gross punting average (42.4) by a Packer in two decades. He punted a team-record 28 times inside the 20 (stat began in 1976). He registered the second-longest punt in Packers playoff history (63 yards) against the San Francisco 49ers in the Divisional Round. In Super Bowl XXXI, Hentrich punted seven times, including 58 and 54-yarders, in a win over the New England Patriots.

=== 1997 season ===
In 1997, Hentrich set the Packers' single-season record for gross punting average of 45.04 at the time, surpassing Jerry Norton's 44.69-yard average from 1963. He ranked third in the NFC and tied for sixth in the NFL in gross average, while his 36.0-yard net average was the fifth-best in the NFC. He tied for third in the NFC in punts inside the 20 with 26. Named NFL Special Teams Player of the Week and set a career high by dropping all five punts inside the 20 in the NFC Championship Game at San Francisco (1/11).

=== 1998 season ===
In 1998, Hentrich played in 16 games, earning his first Pro Bowl berth as well as All-Pro honors from the Associated Press. He led the NFL in both gross (47.2) and net average (39.2). His gross average was sixth and net average ranked fifth in NFL history. He booted 29 of 85 kickoffs (34.1 percent) for touchbacks, exceeding the team's 1997 touchback total by 25. Hentrich was named AFC Special Teams Player of the Month for November 1998 after averaging 50.3 yards per kick (43.8 net). He had a streak of eight consecutive punts better than 50 yards from 11/8 to 11/22. Completed a 13-yard pass to Jackie Harris on a fake punt to convert a fourth down versus the San Diego Chargers. Earned AFC Special Teams Player of the Week honors after pinning three punts inside the 20 (one at Bucs' one-yard line) with a 71-yard punt against the Tampa Bay Buccaneers.

=== 1999 season ===
In 1999, played in all 16 games and all four playoff games and punted a career-high 90 times for a 42.5-yard gross average. Net average of 38.1 yards ranked third in the AFC, and his 35 punts downed inside the 20 (with only three touchbacks) ranked second in the NFL, trailing only Baltimore's Kyle Richardson. Earned the Golden Toe Award from Pro Football Weekly, given annually to the league's top kicker or punter. Downed three punts inside the six-yard line, including two downed inside the three-yard line in a win over the Cleveland Browns. He developed his "knuckleball" punt in 1999, which led to a Darrien Gordon fumble to seal a win over the Oakland Raiders. Hentrich boomed a career-long 78-yard punt and downed three inside the 20 against the Pittsburgh Steelers.

=== 2000 season ===
In 2000, handled punting, kickoff and extra-point holder duties in 16 regular season games and one playoff game. Recorded 76 punts for a 40.8-yard gross average, and his punts were returned for 160 yards, the second-lowest total in AFC and sixth-lowest total in NFL. Ranked third in the AFC and tied for third in the NFL with 33 punts downed inside the 20-yard line, which trailed only Baltimore's Kyle Richardson (35) and Pittsburgh's Josh Miller (34).

=== 2001 season ===
In 2001, saw action in all 16 games and was named an alternate to the Pro Bowl. Booted 85 punts for 3,567 yards, both of which ranked second in his career (90 punts for 3,824 yards in 1999). His 37.0 net average ranked fourth in AFC, and he tied for second in the AFC (Matt Turk, Miami) with 28 punts inside opponent's 20-yard line. He tied his career high with 10 punts for an average of 40.2 yards at Baltimore (10/7). He set career highs (minimum four attempts) with a 57.5 gross average and a 48.5 net average against the Jacksonville Jaguars on four punts. Against his former team, the Packers, connected on a 70-yard punt, which was downed on Green Bay's one-yard line and led to a safety the next play.

=== 2002 season ===
In 2002, played in all 16 regular season games and punted 65 times for a 41.9-yard gross average and a 33.9-yard net average, ranking fifth and 10th in the AFC, respectively. He placed 28 punts inside the 20 (fourth in AFC) with just five touchbacks.

After Joe Nedney hyperextended his knee in the AFC Championship at Oakland, assumed placekicking duties and converted his only extra point attempt without a field goal attempt.

=== 2003 season ===
Converted two fake punts for first downs during the season, the first a 17-yard pass to Greg Comella against the Dallas Cowboys (9/15) and the second a five-yard rush on fourth-and-one play against the Jacksonville Jaguars (10/13). Against the Cleveland Browns (9/22), he hit a knuckleball punt that caused a Dennis Northcutt fumble, which led to Titans touchdown. At Baltimore (11/24), had a punt blocked by Ed Reed for the first time since 1995.

=== Later years ===
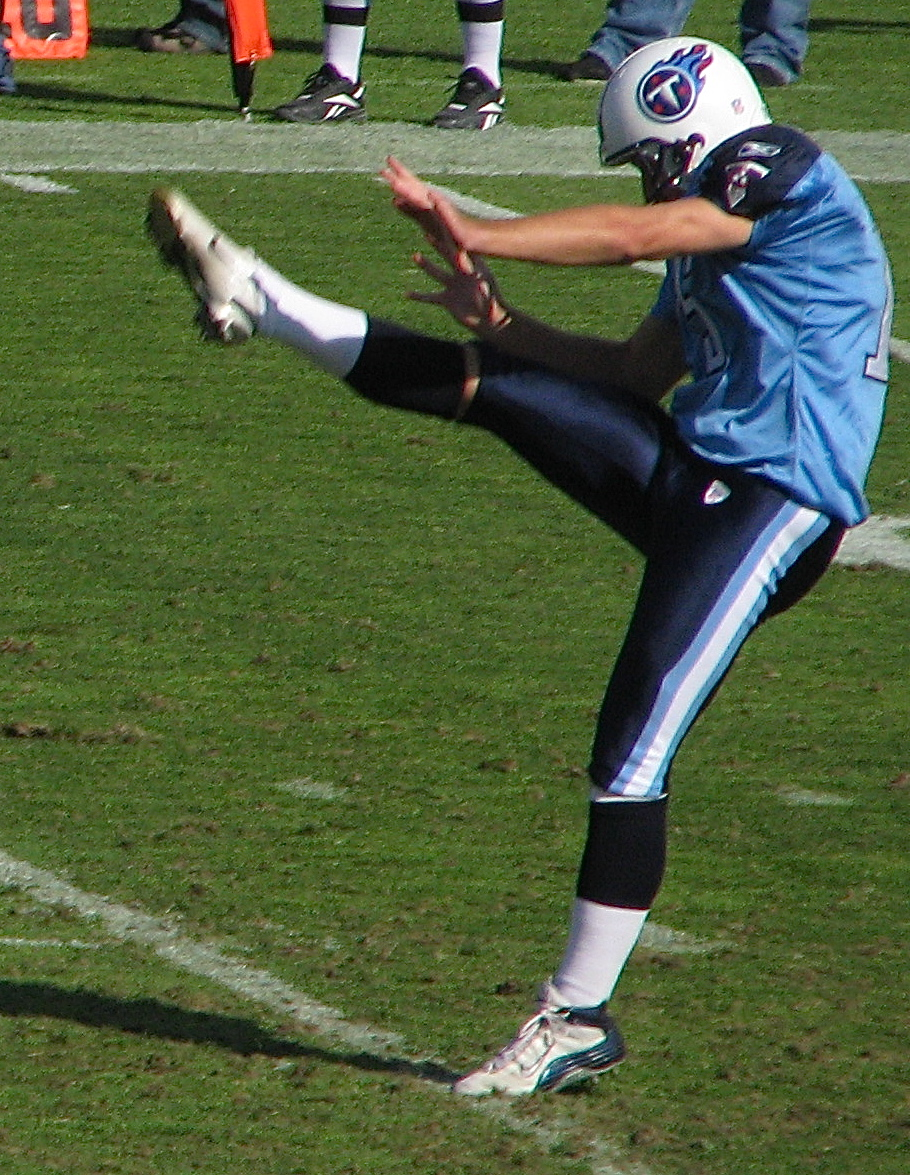
Hentrich with the Tennessee Titans in 2007

Hentrich became a free agent after the 2008 season and was contemplating retiring. On March 6, 2009, he decided to return to football and the Titans. He signed a one-year deal for the veteran minimum, which under the labor agreement costs teams considerably less in cap dollars.

Hentrich was placed on injured reserve in 2009, ending his season.

He retired following the 2009 season after playing in 241 games and 16 seasons, falling just short of 50,000 career punting yards. He was the last remaining Titan player who was also a member of the 1999 team that appeared in the Super Bowl.
