= 1987 Notre Dame Fighting Irish football team =

American college football season

1987 Notre Dame Fighting Irish football

Cotton Bowl Classic, L 10–35 vs. Texas A&M
- Conference: Independent

Ranking
- AP: No. 17
- Record: 8–4
- Head coach: Lou Holtz (2nd season)
- Offensive scheme: Wishbone triple option
- Defensive coordinator: Foge Fazio (2nd season)
- Base defense: 4–3
- MVP: Tim Brown
- Captains: Chuck Lanza; Byron Spruell
- Home stadium: Notre Dame Stadium

1987 NCAA Division I-A independents football records
	Conf.					Overall
Team	W		L		T	W		L		T
No. 1 Miami (FL)		–		–		12	–	0	–	0
No. 4 Syracuse		–		–		11	–	0	–	1
No. 2 Florida State		–		–		11	–	1	–	0
No. 15 South Carolina		–		–		8	–	4	–	0
Pittsburgh		–		–		8	–	4	–	0
Penn State		–		–		8	–	4	–	0
No. 17 Notre Dame		–		–		8	–	4	–	0
Southern Miss		–		–		6	–	5	–	0
Rutgers		–		–		6	–	5	–	0
Southwestern Louisiana		–		–		6	–	5	–	0
Memphis State		–		–		5	–	5	–	1
Northern Illinois		–		–		5	–	5	–	1
West Virginia		–		–		6	–	6	–	0
Tulane		–		–		6	–	6	–	0
Army		–		–		5	–	6	–	0
Boston College		–		–		5	–	6	–	0
East Carolina		–		–		5	–	6	–	0
Akron		–		–		4	–	7	–	0
Cincinnati		–		–		4	–	7	–	0
Louisville		–		–		3	–	7	–	1
Temple		–		–		3	–	8	–	0
Tulsa		–		–		3	–	8	–	0
Virginia Tech		–		–		2	–	9	–	0
Navy		–		–		2	–	9	–	0
Rankings from AP Poll

The 1987 Notre Dame Fighting Irish football team was an American football team that represented the University of Notre Dame as an independent during the 1987 NCAA Division I-A football season. In their second year under head coach Lou Holtz, the Irish compiled an 8–4 record, outscored opponents by a total of 329 to 183, and were ranked No. 17 in the final AP poll. They opened the season with victories over No. 9 Michigan and No. 17 Michigan State, were ranked as high as No. 4, and lost the last three games of the season to unranked Penn State, No. 2 Miami (FL), and in the Cotton Bowl to No. 13 Texas A&M.

Wide receiver and return specialist Tim Brown tallied 1,843 all-purpose yards (including 846 receiving and 857 on kickoff and punt returns), won the Heisman Trophy, and was a consensus first-team pick on the 1987 All-America college football team.

Center Chuck Lanza also received first-team All-America honors from Football News and the NEA. Linebacker Ned Bolcar was named the CBS/Chevrolet Defensive Player of the Year. The team's other statistical leaders during the regular season included quarterbacks Tony Rice (663 passing yards, 104.9 passer rating) and Terry Andrysiak (480 passing yards, 122.3 passer rating), running back Mark Green (861 rushing yards), kicker Tim Gradel (75 points scored, 33 of 33 PAT, 14 of 18 field goals), and Bolcar (106 tackles).

The team played its home games at Notre Dame Stadium in Notre Dame, Indiana.

== Schedule ==
Date	Time	Opponent	Rank	Site	TV	Result	Attendance	Source
September 12	3:30 p.m.	at No. 9 Michigan	No. 16	Michigan Stadium; Ann Arbor, MI (rivalry)	ABC	W 26–7	106,098	
September 19	7:45 p.m.	No. 17 Michigan State	No. 9	Notre Dame Stadium; Notre Dame, IN (rivalry)	ESPN	W 31–8	59,075	
September 26	12:00 p.m.	at Purdue	No. 8	Ross–Ade Stadium; West Lafayette, IN (rivalry)		W 44–20	68,528	
October 10	7:00 p.m.	at Pittsburgh	No. 4	Pitt Stadium; Pittsburgh, PA (rivalry)	ESPN	L 22–30	56,400	
October 17	3:30 p.m.	at Air Force	No. 11	Falcon Stadium; Colorado Springs, CO (rivalry)		W 35–14	51,112	
October 24	2:30 p.m.	USC	No. 10	Notre Dame Stadium; Notre Dame, IN (rivalry)	CBS	W 26–15	59,075	
October 31	12:00 p.m.	Navy	No. 9	Notre Dame Stadium; Notre Dame, IN (rivalry)		W 56–13	59,075	
November 7	12:00 p.m.	Boston College	No. 9	Notre Dame Stadium; Notre Dame, IN (Holy War)		W 32–25	59,075	
November 14	2:30 p.m.	No. 10 Alabama	No. 7	Notre Dame Stadium; Notre Dame, IN	CBS	W 37–6	59,075	
November 21	12:00 p.m.	at Penn State	No. 7	Beaver Stadium; University Park, PA (rivalry)	CBS	L 20–21	84,000	
November 28	3:30 p.m.	at No. 2 Miami (FL)	No. 10	Miami Orange Bowl; Miami, FL (rivalry)	CBS	L 0–24	76,640	
January 1, 1988	1:30 p.m.	vs. No. 13 Texas A&M	No. 12	Cotton Bowl; Dallas, TX (Cotton Bowl Classic)	CBS	L 10–35	73,006	
Rankings from AP Poll released prior to the game; All times are in Eastern time

== Game summaries ==
=== At Michigan ===
#16 Notre Dame at #9 Michigan

Team	1	2	3	4	Total
• Notre Dame	10	0	7	9	26
Michigan	0	0	7	0	7

- Date: September 12
- Location: Michigan Stadium, Ann Arbor, MI
- Game start: 3:30 p.m. EST
- Game attendance: 106,098
- Television network: ABC

Scoring summary
Q1	ND	Gradel 44 yard field goal	ND 3–0
Q1	ND	T. Brown 11 yard pass from Andrysiak (Gradel kick)	ND 10–0
Q3	ND	Banks 1 yard run (Gradel kick)	ND 17–0
Q3	MICH	McMurtry 12 yard pass from D. Brown (Gillette kick)	ND 17–7
Q4	ND	Gradel 38 yard field goal	ND 20–7
Q4	ND	Watters 18 yard run (pass failed)	ND 26–7

Terry Andrysiak completed 11 of 15 passes for 137 yards and a touchdown while Notre Dame converted four of Michigan's seven turnovers into scores.

=== Michigan State ===
Team	1	2	3	4	Total
Michigan St	0	0	0	8	8
• Notre Dame	19	5	7	0	31

- Date: September 19
- Location: Notre Dame Stadium, South Bend, IN
- Game start: 7:45 p.m. EST
- Game attendance: 59,075
- Television network: ESPN

Scoring summary
Q1	ND	Ezor downed ball in end zone	ND 2–0
Q1	ND	Gradel 27 yard field goal	ND 5–0
Q1	ND	Brown 71 yard punt return (Gradel kick)	ND 12–0
Q1	ND	Brown 66 yard punt return (Gradel kick)	ND 19–0
Q2	ND	McAllister tackled in end zone	ND 21–0
Q2	ND	Gradel 37 yard field goal	ND 24–0
Q3	ND	Johnson 3 yard run (Gradel kick)	ND 31–0
Q4	MSU	Rison 57 yard pass from McAllister (Wilson pass from McAllister)	ND 31–8

=== Purdue ===
Team	1	2	3	4	Total
• Notre Dame	10	7	14	13	44
Purdue	0	17	3	0	20

- Date: September 27
- Location: Ross–Ade Stadium, West Lafayette, IN
- Game start: 12:00 p.m. EST
- Game attendance: 68,528

Scoring summary
Q1	ND	Gradel 35 yard field goal	ND 3–0
Q1	ND	Johnson 6 yard run (Gradel kick)	ND 10–0
Q2	PUR	Schumacher 4 yard pass from Downing (Briggs kick)	ND 10–7
Q2	PUR	C. Williams 20 yard pass from Downing (Briggs kick)	PUR 14–10
Q2	PUR	Briggs 18 yard field goal	PUR 17–10
Q2	ND	Johnson 1 yard run (Gradel kick)	Tie 17–17
Q3	PUR	Briggs 50 yard field goal	PUR 20–17
Q3	ND	Johnson 8 yard run (Gradel kick)	ND 24–20
Q3	ND	Brown 49 yard pass from Andrysiak (Gradel kick)	ND 31–20
Q4	ND	Gradel 28 yard field goal	ND 34–20
Q4	ND	Gradel 44 yard field goal	ND 37–20
Q4	ND	Southall 57 yard interception return (Gradel kick)	ND 44–20

=== Air Force ===
Team	1	2	3	4	Total
• Notre Dame	14	0	14	7	35
Air Force	0	7	0	7	14

- Date: October 17
- Location: Falcon Stadium, Colorado Springs, CO
- Game start: 3:30 p.m. EST
- Game attendance: 51,112

Scoring summary
Q1	ND	Rice 1 yard run (Gradel kick)	ND 7–0
Q1	ND	Rice 4 yard run (Gradel kick)	ND 14–0
Q2	AFA	Booker 4 yard run (Yarborough kick)	ND 14–7
Q3	ND	Johnson 1 yard run (Gradel kick)	ND 21–7
Q3	ND	Banks 1 yard run (Gradel kick)	ND 28–7
Q4	AFA	Dowis 1 yard run (Yarborough kick)	ND 28–14
Q4	ND	Brown 74 yard punt return (Gradel kick)	ND 35–14

=== USC ===
Team	1	2	3	4	Total
USC	7	0	0	8	15
• Notre Dame	3	17	6	0	26

- Date: October 24
- Location: Notre Dame Stadium, South Bend, IN
- Game attendance: 59,075
- Television network: CBS

Scoring summary
Q1	USC	Jackson 9 yard pass from Peete (Rodriguez kick)	USC 7–0
Q1	ND	Gradel 26 yard field goal	USC 7–3
Q2	ND	Rice 26 yard run (Gradel kick)	ND 10–7
Q2	ND	T. Brown 5 yard run (Gradel kick)	ND 17–7
Q2	ND	Gradel 32 yard field goal	ND 20–7
Q3	ND	Green 11 yard run (run failed)	ND 26–7
Q4	USC	Lockwood 5 yard run (Tanner pass from Peete)	ND 26–15

=== Navy ===
Team	1	2	3	4	Total
Navy	0	6	0	7	13
• Notre Dame	14	21	14	7	56

- Date: October 31
- Location: Notre Dame Stadium, South Bend, IN
- Game start: 12:00 p.m. EST
- Game attendance: 59,075

Scoring summary
Q1	ND	Johnson 6 yard run (Gradel kick)	ND 7–0
Q1	ND	Johnson 9 yard run (Gradel kick)	ND 14–0
Q2	ND	Green 21 yard run (Gradel kick)	ND 21–0
Q2	NAVY	Fundoukos 43 yard field goal	ND 21–3
Q2	ND	Johnson 1 yard run (Gradel kick)	ND 28–3
Q2	NAVY	Fundoukos 31 yard field goal	ND 28–6
Q2	ND	Brown 51 yard pass from Graham (Gradel kick)	ND 35–6
Q3	ND	Johnson 2 yard run (Gradel kick)	ND 42–6
Q3	ND	Watters 6 yard run (Gradel kick)	ND 49–6
Q4	ND	Brooks 4 yard run (Gradel kick)	ND 56–6
Q4	NAVY	Sims 4 yard run (Fundoukos kick)	ND 56–13

=== Boston College ===
Team	1	2	3	4	Total
Boston College	7	10	8	0	25
• Notre Dame	6	0	12	14	32

- Date: November 7
- Location: Notre Dame Stadium, South Bend, IN
- Game attendance: 59,075

Scoring summary
Q1		ND	Gradel 21 yard field goal	ND 3–0
Q1		BC	Hudginson 3 yard pass from Power (Lowe kick)	BC 7–3
Q1		ND	Gradel 21 yard field goal	BC 7–6
Q2		BC	Lowe 31 yard field goal	BC 10–6
Q2		BC	Bell 11 yard run (Lowe kick)	BC 17–6
Q3		ND	Green 33 yard run (run failed)	BC 17–12
Q3	10:02	BC	Flutie 31 yard pass from Parker (Power run)	BC 25–12
Q3		ND	Johnson 1 yard run (run failed)	BC 25–18
Q4		ND	Braxston 1 yard run (Gradel kick)	Tie 25–25
Q4		ND	Green 2 yard run (Gradel kick)	ND 32–25

- ND: Mark Green 152 Rush Yds
- ND: Tim Brown 294 all-purpose Yds

=== Alabama ===
Team	1	2	3	4	Total
Alabama	3	3	0	0	6
• Notre Dame	3	17	3	14	37

- Date: November 14
- Location: Notre Dame Stadium, South Bend, IN
- Game attendance: 59,075
- Referee: Mack Gentry (SEC)
- TV announcers (CBS): Brent Musburger, Pat Haden and John Dockery

Scoring summary
Q1	ALA	Doyle 34 yard field goal	ALA 3–0
Q1	ND	Gradel 49 yard field goal	Tie 3–3
Q2	ND	Rice 12 yard run (Gradel kick)	ND 10–3
Q2	ND	Heck 3 yard pass from Rice (Gradel kick)	ND 17–3
Q2	ND	Gradel 21 yard field goal	ND 20–3
Q2	ALA	Doyle 28 yard field goal	ND 20–6
Q3	ND	Gradel 22 yard field goal	ND 23–6
Q4	ND	Green 74 yard run (Gradel kick)	ND 30–6
Q4	ND	Watters 75 yard run (Gradel kick)	ND 37–6

== Roster ==
1987 Notre Dame Fighting Irish football team roster
Players
Coaches
Offense

Pos.	#	Name	Class
WR	80	Steve Alaniz	Jr
OT	72	Joe Allen
QB	2	Terry Andrysiak	Sr
RB	39	Braxston Banks
QB	8	Steve Belles	Jr
WR	81	Tim Brown	Sr
QB	17	Kent Graham	Fr
QB	11	Pete Graham	Jr
RB	24	Mark Green	Jr
OT	66	Andy Heck	Jr
C	51	Chuck Lanza
QB	9	Tony Rice	So
RB	12	Ricky Watters	Fr

Defense

Pos.	#	Name	Class
DT	90	Jeff Alm	So
LB	47	Ned Bolcar	So
DT	67	Bob Dahl	Fr
SS	26	Greg Davis
SS	13	Pat Eilers	Jr
LB	48	Cedric Figaro	Sr
DE	92	Bryan Flannery
CB	32	D’Juan Francisco	Jr
LB	36	Donn Grimm
DE	38	Darrell Gordon	Jr
LB	7	Andre Jones	Fr
LB	37	Scott Kowalkowski	Fr
CB	1	Todd Lyght	Fr
LB	34	Wes Pritchett	Jr
LB	40	Tim Ryan	Fr
FS	15	Pat Terrell	So
CB	5	Brandy Wells	Sr

Special teams

Pos.	#	Name	Class

Head coach

- Lou Holtz

Coordinators/assistant coaches

- Foge Fazio (DC)
- George Stewart (LB)

Legend

- (C) Team captain
- (S) Suspended
- (I) Ineligible
- Injured
- Redshirt

== Team players drafted into the NFL ==
The following players were drafted into professional football following the season.

Player	Position	Round	Pick	Franchise
Tim Brown	Wide Receiver	1	6	Los Angeles Raiders
Tom Redehr	Tackle	3	69	New England Patriots
Chuck Lanza	Center	3	70	Pittsburgh Steelers
Cedric Figaro	Linebacker	6	152	San Diego Chargers
Brandy Wells	Defensive Back	9	226	Cincinnati Bengals
