= 1988 Notre Dame Fighting Irish football team =

American college football season

1988 Notre Dame Fighting Irish football

Consensus national champion Fiesta Bowl champion

Fiesta Bowl, W 34–21 vs. West Virginia
- Conference: Independent

Ranking
- Coaches: No. 1
- AP: No. 1
- Record: 12–0
- Head coach: Lou Holtz (3rd season)
- Offensive scheme: Wishbone triple option
- Defensive coordinator: Barry Alvarez (1st season)
- Base defense: 5–2
- MVP: Tony Rice
- Captains: Ned Bolcar; Andy Heck; Mark Green
- Home stadium: Notre Dame Stadium

1988 NCAA Division I-A independents football records
	Conf.					Overall
Team	W		L		T	W		L		T
No. 1 Notre Dame		–		–		12	–	0	–	0
No. 2 Miami (FL)		–		–		11	–	1	–	0
No. 3 Florida State		–		–		11	–	1	–	0
No. 5 West Virginia		–		–		11	–	1	–	0
Southern Miss		–		–		10	–	2	–	0
No. 13 Syracuse		–		–		10	–	2	–	0
Army		–		–		9	–	3	–	0
Louisville		–		–		8	–	3	–	0
South Carolina		–		–		8	–	4	–	0
Northern Illinois		–		–		7	–	4	–	0
Pittsburgh		–		–		6	–	5	–	0
Memphis State		–		–		6	–	5	–	0
Southwestern Louisiana		–		–		6	–	5	–	0
Rutgers		–		–		5	–	6	–	0
Akron		–		–		5	–	6	–	0
Penn State		–		–		5	–	6	–	0
Tulane		–		–		5	–	6	–	0
Temple		–		–		4	–	7	–	0
Tulsa		–		–		4	–	7	–	0
Boston College		–		–		3	–	8	–	0
Cincinnati		–		–		3	–	8	–	0
East Carolina		–		–		3	–	8	–	0
Navy		–		–		3	–	8	–	0
Virginia Tech		–		–		3	–	8	–	0
Rankings from AP Poll

The 1988 Notre Dame Fighting Irish football team was an American football team that represented the University of Notre Dame as an independent during the 1988 NCAA Division I-A football season. In their third year head under coach Lou Holtz, the Irish compiled a perfect 12–0 record, outscored opponents by a total of 359 to 135, and were ranked No. 1 in the final AP and UPI polls.

En route to the national championship, the Irish defeated teams that finished the season ranked No. 2 (Miami (FL)), No. 4 (Michigan), No. 5 (West Virginia in the Fiesta Bowl), and No. 7 (USC) in the final AP poll. The 1988 Fighting Irish have been rated as one of the best teams in the history of college football. The team's victory over Miami, colloquially referred to as the "Catholics vs. Convicts" game, ended the Hurricanes' 36-game regular season winning streak, and is considered one of the most memorable games in all of college football history.

Linebacker Michael Stonebreaker and defensive end Frank Stams were consensus first-team picks on the 1988 All-America college football team. Offensive tackle Andy Heck also received first-team All-America honors from the Associated Press and United Press International. The team's statistical leaders included quarterback Tony Rice (1,176 passing yards, 700 rushing yards) and Rocket Ismail (321 receiving yards, 431 kickoff return yards).

The team played its home games at Notre Dame Stadium in Notre Dame, Indiana.

== Schedule ==
Date	Time	Opponent	Rank	Site	TV	Result	Attendance	Source
September 10	8:00 p.m.	No. 9 Michigan	No. 13	Notre Dame Stadium; Notre Dame, IN (rivalry)	CBS	W 19–17	59,075	
September 17	11:00 a.m.	at Michigan State	No. 8	Spartan Stadium; East Lansing, MI (rivalry)	ABC	W 20–3	77,472	
September 24	12:00 p.m.	Purdue	No. 8	Notre Dame Stadium; Notre Dame, IN (rivalry)		W 52–7	59,075	
October 1	7:00 p.m.	Stanford	No. 5	Notre Dame Stadium; Notre Dame, IN (rivalry)	ESPN	W 42–14	59,075	
October 8	3:00 p.m.	at Pittsburgh	No. 5	Pitt Stadium; Pittsburgh, PA (rivalry)	ESPN	W 30–20	56,500	
October 15	1:30 p.m.	No. 1 Miami (FL)	No. 4	Notre Dame Stadium; Notre Dame, IN (rivalry)	CBS	W 31–30	59,075	
October 22	12:00 p.m.	Air Force	No. 2	Notre Dame Stadium; Notre Dame, IN (rivalry)		W 41–13	59,075	
October 29	11:00 a.m.	vs. Navy	No. 2	Memorial Stadium; Baltimore, MD (rivalry)		W 22–7	54,929	
November 5	12:00 p.m.	Rice	No. 1	Notre Dame Stadium; Notre Dame, IN	WGN-TV	W 54–11	59,075	
November 19	12:00 p.m.	Penn State	No. 1	Notre Dame Stadium; Notre Dame, IN (rivalry)	CBS	W 21–3	59,075	
November 26	3:30 p.m.	at No. 2 USC	No. 1	Los Angeles Memorial Coliseum; Los Angeles, CA (rivalry)	ABC	W 27–10	93,829	
January 2, 1989	4:30 p.m.	vs. No. 3 West Virginia	No. 1	Sun Devil Stadium; Tempe, AZ (Fiesta Bowl)	NBC	W 34–21	74,911	
Rankings from AP Poll released prior to the game; All times are in Eastern time

== Rankings ==
Ranking movements Legend: ██ Increase in ranking ██ Decrease in ranking ( ) = First-place votes
	Week																
Poll	Pre	1	2	3	4	5	6	7	8	9	10	11	12	13	14	15	Final
AP	13 (1)	13	13	8	8	5	5	4	2 (22)	2 (19)	1 (44)	1 (42)	1 (40)	1 (35)	1 (57)	1 (49)	1 (58 1/2)
Coaches	12	12	11	9	8	5	5	4	2 (10)	2 (8)	1 (30)	1 (32)	1 (31)	1 (29)	1 (42)	1 (42)	1 (42)

== Game summaries ==
=== Michigan ===
#9 Michigan at #13 Notre Dame

Team	1	2	3	4	Total
No. 9 Wolverines	0	7	7	3	17
• No. 13 Fighting Irish	10	3	0	6	19

- Date: September 10
- Location: Notre Dame Stadium,
  Notre Dame, IN
- Game start: 8:00 PM EST
- Game attendance: 59,075
- TV announcers (CBS): Brent Musburger, Pat Haden, and John Dockery

Scoring summary
1	10:11	ND	Watters 81-yard punt return (Ho kick)	ND 7-0
1		ND	Ho 31-yard field goal	ND 10-0
2		ND	Ho 38-yard field goal	ND 13-0
2	8:29	MICH	Hoard 1-yard run (Gillette kick)	ND 13-7
3	4:44	MICH	Taylor 1-yard run (Gillette kick)	MICH 14-13
4		ND	Ho 26-yard field goal	ND 16-14
4		MICH	Gillette 49-yard field goal	MICH 17-16
4	1:13	ND	Ho 26-yard field goal	ND 19-17

13th ranked Notre Dame debuted its season against No. 9 Michigan in Notre Dame Stadium. In a 19-17 thriller, walk-on kicker Reggie Ho kicked a 26-yard field goal winner with 1:13 remaining. Lou Holtz's concerns about his youthful offense and green receivers were realized as the Irish offense did not score a single offensive touchdown. In addition to Reggie Ho's game winner, the Irish kicker scored 3 other field goals. The lone touchdown from Notre Dame came from a Ricky Watters punt return, an 81-yard runback. Michigan's Mike Gillette, who had given the Wolverines the lead with 5:34 left by kicking a 49-yard field goal, had one final chance to give Michigan the win, narrowly missing from 48 yards as the final gun sounded.

=== At Michigan State ===
#8 Notre Dame at Michigan State

Team	1	2	3	4	Total
• No. 8 Fighting Irish	0	6	7	7	20
Spartans	3	0	0	0	3

- Date: September 17
- Location: Spartan Stadium,
  East Lansing, MI
- Game start: 11:00 AM EST
- Game attendance: 77,472
- TV announcers (ABC): Gary Bender, Dick Vermeil and Becky Dixon

Scoring summary
Q1	MSU	Langeloh 39 yard field goal	MSU 3–0
Q2	ND	Ho 31 yard field goal	Tie 3–3
Q2	ND	Ho 22 yard field goal	ND 6–3
Q3	ND	Rice 8 yard run (Ho kick)	ND 13–3
Q4	ND	Stonebreaker 39 yard interception return (Ho kick)	ND 20–3

MSU threatened Notre Dame early with a 1st-quarter field goal, but that would be the only points of the day the Notre Dame defense would allow as the Irish downed MSU 20–3. Notre Dame struggled early in the contest, accumulating only 50 yards running on 21 carries. Reggie Ho tied the game with 31-yarder in the second quarter and put the Irish ahead 6–3 at the half with a 22-yard field goal. The second half was a different story for the Irish offense, as quarterback Tony Rice and company amassed 195 yards on 33 carries in the second half. 156 yards came on 19 carries in the third quarter alone. Tony Rice ran for an 8-yard touchdown and Michael Stonebreaker added a 39-yard interception return for a touchdown in the final quarter to end any hopes of a Spartan upset. The star of the game was Notre Dame's defense, which held the Spartans to 89 yards rushing for the game. Running back Mark Green led the Irish rushing attack with 125 yards on the ground.

=== Purdue ===
Purdue at #8 Notre Dame

Team	1	2	3	4	Total
Boilermakers	0	0	0	7	7
• No. 8 Fighting Irish	14	28	3	7	52

- Date: September 24
- Location: Notre Dame Stadium,
  South Bend, IN
- Game start: 12:00 PM EST
- Game attendance: 59,075
- Television network: WGN-TV

Scoring summary
1	ND	Rice 38-yard run (Ho kick)	ND 7-0
1	ND	Brown 8-yard pass from Rice (Ho kick)	ND 14-0
2	ND	Ismail 54-yard pass from Rice (Ho kick)	ND 21-0
2	ND	Green 7-yard run (Ho kick)	ND 28-0
2	ND	Watters 66-yard punt return (Ho kick)	ND 35-0
2	ND	Brooks 34-yard pass from Belles (Ho kick)	ND 42-0
3	ND	Hackett 44-yard field goal	ND 45-0
4	ND	Culver 36-yard run (Hackett kick)	ND 52-0
4	PUR	C. Williams 10-yard pass from Fox (Sullivan kick)	ND 52-7

Tony Rice passed for two touchdowns and ran for another as Notre Dame shredded Purdue 52–7. It was one of the worst losses by Purdue in the history of the series, and its worst loss since a 48-0 drubbing in 1970. Notre Dame scored early and often, starting with a 38-yard Rice option run for a touchdown. Tony Rice's first passing touchdown on the year was an 8-yarder to freshman tight end Derek Brown. The Irish exploded for 28 points in the second quarter, highlighted by a 54-yard Rice touchdown pass to Rocket Ismail. Tailback Mark Green added a 7-yard touchdown run and Ricky Watters returned a punt 66 yards for a score. Coach Lou Holtz used three separate quarterbacks in the second quarter and four total in the game. 3rd-string quarterback Steve Belles hit running back Tony Brooks for a 34-yard score to put the Irish up 42–0 at half-time. The second half saw the Irish score ten points with back-ups, a 44-yard field goal by Billy Hackett and a 36-yard run from freshman fullback Rodney Culver. Purdue's lone touchdown was a fourth quarter 7-yard pass from Brian Fox to Calvin Williams. The Irish improved to 3-0 while the Boilermakers dropped to 1–2 on the year.

=== Stanford ===
Stanford at #5 Notre Dame

Team	1	2	3	4	Total
Cardinal	0	7	7	7	21
• No. 5 Fighting Irish	6	22	7	7	42

- Date: October 1
- Location: Notre Dame Stadium,
  Notre Dame, IN
- Game start: 7:00 PM EST
- Game attendance: 59,075
- Television network: ESPN

Tony Rice rushed for two touchdowns and passed for a third to lead the Fighting Irish to a 42–14 blowout of Stanford. Rice completed 11 of 14 passes for 129 yards and rushed for 107 yards. Rice scored runs of 30 yards and 6 yards while the Irish tailbacks added 3 other scores with touchdowns from Mark Green, Tony Brooks, and Anthony Johnson. Despite the lopsided score, Stanford did mount two of the longest scoring drives against the Irish to date, with a 68-yard drive by quarterback Brian Johnson and a 73-yard drive by back-up quarterback Jason Palumbis. Freshman standout tight end Derek Brown added the Irish's sole passing touchdown in the 3rd quarter. The Irish defense stymied the Cardinal, holding them to just 111 yards in the first half.

=== At Pittsburgh ===
#5 Notre Dame at Pittsburgh

Team	1	2	3	4	Total
• No. 5 Fighting Irish	14	3	6	7	30
Panthers	7	7	3	3	20

- Date: October 8
- Location: Pitt Stadium,
  Pittsburgh, PA
- Game start: 3:00 PM EST
- Game attendance: 56,500

Notre Dame, a loser to Pittsburgh three years in a row, narrowly avoided another such upset as the Irish improved to 5–0 on the season. The 30–20 victory in the rain did little to inspire confidence that Notre Dame could beat No. 1 Miami the following week. The Panthers made a number of critical mistakes that led the Panthers to believe they did more to lose the game more than Notre Dame did to win it. "We could have won the game," said Panther coach Mike Gottfried, "but we made just enough mistakes to lose it."

Notre Dame struggled to contain Panther quarterback Darnell Dickerson, who at times had 10 seconds or more per play. The Panthers came out strong early, starting the game with an impressive drive, but before the Panthers could score, Irish cornerback Todd Lyght forced a fumble, which Chris Zorich recovered. After a stalled Irish drive, the Panthers got the ball back and took a 7–0 lead on a Dickerson touchdown. Notre Dame answered back with a 52-yard Tony Brooks run to the 2-yard line. The large run was the result of a failed Panther blitz attempt. Tony Rice scored on a 2-yard keeper to tie the game 7-7. After an Anthony Johnson touchdown gave the Irish a 14–7 lead, Dickerson scored his second touchdown to tie the game again at 14-14. Reggie Ho scored a 37-yard field goal to give the Irish a 17-14 half time lead.

The critical moment of the game came in the second half, when late into the fourth quarter the Irish were clinging to a 23–20 lead when the Panthers forced the Irish into a 4th and long from their own 23-yard line. But a late 12 men on the field penalty against the Panthers gave the Irish new life. The 15-yard penalty gave Notre Dame the ball on its 48-yard line, and 11 plays later Mark Green ran for an 8-yard touchdown with 4:30 left in the game to put victory out of reach for the Panthers. Tony Rice went 8-14 passing for the game and a third quarter Braxston Banks touchdown gave the Irish the lead for good.

=== Miami ===
#1 Miami (FL) at #4 Notre Dame

Team	1	2	3	4	Total
No. 1 Hurricanes	0	21	0	9	30
• No. 4 Fighting Irish	7	14	10	0	31

- Date: October 15
- Location: Notre Dame Stadium,
  Notre Dame, IN
- Game start: 1:30 PM EST
- Game attendance: 59,075
- TV announcers (CBS): Brent Musburger, Pat Haden, and John Dockery

Scoring summary
1	3:36	ND	Rice 7-yard run (Ho kick)	ND 7-0
2	12:40	Miami	A. Brown 8-yard pass from Walsh (Huerta kick)	Tied 7-7
2	7:34	ND	B. Banks 8-yard pass from Rice (Ho kick)	ND 14-7
2		ND	Pat Terrell 60-yard interception return (Ho kick)	ND 21-7
2	2:16	Miami	Conley 23-yard pass from Walsh (Huerta kick)	ND 21-14
2	0:21	Miami	C. Gary 15-yard pass from Walsh (Huerta kick)	Tied 21-21
3	8:09	ND	P. Eilers 3-yard run (Ho kick)	ND 28-21
3	0:37	ND	Ho 27-yard field goal	ND 31-21
4	13:07	Miami	Huerta 23-yard field goal	ND 31-24
4	0:45	Miami	A. Brown 11-yard pass from Walsh (pass failed)	ND 31-30

The October 15, 1988, game between Notre Dame and the University of Miami Hurricanes is colloquially referred to as the "Catholics vs. Convicts" game. The University of Notre Dame was dubbed the "Catholics" and the University of Miami was dubbed as "the Convicts".

=== Air Force ===
Air Force at #2 Notre Dame

Team	1	2	3	4	Total
Falcons	6	7	0	0	13
• No. 2 Fighting Irish	6	14	14	7	41

- Date: October 22
- Location: Notre Dame Stadium,
  South Bend, IN
- Game start: 12:00 PM EST
- Game attendance: 59,075
- Television network: WGN-TV

A potential letdown after defeating No. 1 Miami the previous week never materialized for the now 2nd ranked Irish, who used a second half onslaught of power running to down the Falcons 41–13. Coach Holtz admitted he was scared all week of a potential upset of his young Notre Dame squad. Of main concern was Air Force's wishbone ground attack, which came into Notre Dame Stadium averaging 46 points and 432 rushing yards a game. Falcons coach Fisher DeBerry's squad had the best ground gaining offense in the nation. Holtz's fears seemed to be valid during the rain in the first half as Notre Dame only held a 7-point lead at the half.

Air Force opened the game with an impressive ground attack. Air Force quarterback Dee Dowis took his team inside the Irish 20 on the game's first offensive drive. But Pat Terrell, the defensive hero of last week's victory over Miami, stepped into the spotlight again, this time with Stan Smagala. Albert Booker, an Air Force halfback, was carrying the ball on second down when Smagala hit him hard. The ball popped free and Terrell recovered the fumble at the Notre Dame 16. After the turnover, Air Force answered with its first field goal by Steve Yarborough from 22 yards out. But Notre Dame matched that by going 71 yards to score on Mark Green's 7-yard touchdown run. In the second quarter, The Irish continued to run the ball, with quarterback Tony Rice and running back Anthony Johnson both running for touchdowns. Air Force answered before the end of the half with a touchdown to cut Notre Dame's lead to just seven points.

The third quarter was all Irish, as five Irish running backs combined for 283 yards, all running for 23 yards or more. One of the highlights was a 50-yard halfback pass late in the third quarter thrown by 3rd-string quarterback Steve Belles. In at running back, Belles took a pitch from Tony Rice, stepped back to his right and threw to a wide open Ricky Watters. The flanker took the ball inside the Air Force 10 and battled his way just over the goal line late in the third quarter. Other scores included a Tony Brooks 42-yard touchdown in the third quarter and another Ricky Watters touchdown catch; this time a 28-yarder from Rice. In the end, the Irish defense held the explosive Falcons to 54 yards rushing in the second half and 195 for the game, 237 yards below its season average.

=== At Navy ===
#2 Notre Dame at Navy

Team	1	2	3	4	Total
• No. 2 Fighting Irish	7	9	6	0	22
Midshipmen	0	0	7	0	7

- Date: October 29
- Location: Memorial Stadium,
  Baltimore, MD
- Game start: 11:00 AM EST
- Game attendance: 54,929

Although unbeaten and No. 2 Notre Dame posted its 25th consecutive victory of the Naval Academy, coach Lou Holtz was not happy. "We couldn't control the line of scrimmage," Holtz said after the victory. "We couldn't throw consistently, we weren't mentally alert and that's my fault. Our offensive line got beat up, we couldn't run inside. We weren't good enough to beat them inside. We're not a very good team right now. We feel fortunate to win." Favored to beat Navy by five touchdowns, the Irish dropped five passes, lost two fumbles, shanked a punt for a mere 10 yds., and got whistled for having twelve men on the field - all before winning the game 22–7. The Midshipmen fumbled on their second play from scrimmage and six plays later Notre Dame led 7–0 on a 10-yard touchdown pass from Rice to Derek Brown, before a crowd of 54,926 at Memorial Stadium. Rodney Culver and Ryan Mihalko ran for touchdowns as Notre Dame opened up a 22–0 lead early in the third quarter en route to reaching an 8–0 record for the first time since 1973. One positive Lou Holtz saw was the play of the defense. "Our defense played really well, but was on the field too long." Notre Dame amassed 396 total yards and held Navy to 192 yards, the lowest for an Irish opponent this year.

=== Rice ===
Rice at #1 Notre Dame

Team	1	2	3	4	Total
Owls	3	3	0	5	11
• No. 1 Fighting Irish	14	17	7	16	54

- Date: November 5
- Location: Notre Dame Stadium,
  Notre Dame, IN]
- Game start: 12:00 PM EST
- Game attendance: 59,075
- Television network: WGN-TV

The Irish scored early and often as Notre Dame dazzled their home crowd of 59,075 with a 54–11 victory. After Rice scored an early field goal in the first quarter, Rocket Ismail returned his first of two kickoffs, a 78-yard return for a score. The Irish offense quickly followed with three touchdowns on their first three offensive possessions. Junior fullback Anthony Johnson rushed for two of Notre Dame's seven TDs, while Tony Brooks and Rodney Culver also added touchdowns. Late in the game, after Rice's third field goal made the score 38–9, Rocket Ismail returned the ensuing kickoff 83 yards for another touchdown. Ismail became the first Notre Dame player to return two kick-offs for touchdowns in a game since Paul Castner in 1922 against Kalamazoo. After Notre Dame's final touchdown, Rice LB Billy Stone returned the blocked extra-point all the way for two points to account for the final score of 54–11. This was the first time a team scored by returning a failed conversion in NCAA Div I history (the rule allowing for the defense to score this way instituted at the start of the 1988–89 season).

=== Penn State ===
Penn State at #1 Notre Dame

Team	1	2	3	4	Total
Nittany Lions	0	3	0	0	3
• No. 1 Fighting Irish	7	7	7	0	21

- Date: November 19
- Location: Notre Dame Stadium
  Notre Dame, IN
- Game start: 12:00 PM EST
- Game attendance: 59,075
- TV announcers (CBS): Tim Brant, John Dockery and Lesley Visser

The Irish came into the game at 9-0 while Penn State was 5-5, on the verge of their first losing season in 50 years. Notre Dame got started early, scoring on their first possession, an 87-yard on 12 play drive. On second-and-5 from Penn State's 48-yard line, Tony Rice threw a 17-yard pass to Ricky Watters, who was wide open 15 yards downfield. Five plays later, Notre Dame scored from Penn State's two. Rice optioned left, froze the Penn State linebacker Eddie Johnson with a pump-fake, then ran into the end zone. Reggie Ho's extra point made it 7–0. In the second quarter, Notre Dame drove 60 yards in five plays to go ahead, 14–0. Rice set up the score with another pass to Watters - a 27-yard play that moved the ball to Penn State's 33-yard line. Two plays later, running back Mark Green took a handoff up the middle, then found daylight to his right and ran 22 yards for a touchdown. Penn State's only score came on the last play of the first half, when Eric Etze kicked a 52-yard field goal.

After leading by 14–3 at halftime, Notre Dame struck quickly for its final score in the third quarter. On first down after a Penn State punt, Tony Rice threw a 67-yard touchdown pass to Raghib Ismail. It was the first time the Fighting Irish had thrown deep all game, and the long pass caught Penn State defensive backs off guard. Ismail was so wide open, he scored even though he had to wait for Rice's underthrown pass. After making the catch at Penn State's 20-yard line, Ismail broke Eddie Johnson's attempted tackle and jogged into the end zone. The win set the stage for the next week's showdown vs. USC, the final hurdle to the national championship game.

=== At USC ===
#1 Notre Dame at #2 USC

Team	1	2	3	4	Total
• No. 1 Fighting Irish	14	6	0	7	27
No. 2 Trojans	0	7	3	0	10

- Date: November 26
- Location: Los Angeles Memorial Coliseum,
  Los Angeles, CA
- Game start: 3:30 EST
- Game attendance: 93,829
- Referee: Bill Richardson
- TV announcers (ABC): Keith Jackson, Bob Griese, and Mike Adamle

Scoring summary
1	10:08	ND	Rice 65-yard run (Ho kick)	ND 7-0
1		ND	Green 2-yard run (Ho kick)	ND 14-0
2	2:24	USC	Lockwood 1-yard run (Rodriguez kick)	ND 14-7
2	0:41	ND	Smagala 64-yard interception return (kick failed)	ND 20-7
3		USC	Rodriguez 36-yard field goal	ND 20-10
4	11:55	ND	Green 1-yard run (Ho kick)	ND 27-10

Notre Dame and USC entered the game undefeated and ranked number one and two respectively for the first time ever in their storied series. It was also the 24th time No. 1 faced No. 2 in college football history. In a controversial move, coach Lou Holtz took his 10-0 Irish squad to L.A. without stars Ricky Watters and Tony Brooks, whom he suspended for disciplinary reasons. The USC Trojans were having a great season under head coach Larry Smith and standout quarterback Rodney Peete. The Irish came into the game as underdogs, but spectacular play of defensive end Frank Stams and cornerback Stan Smagala aided the Irish offense, led by Tony Rice, to an Irish victory. Notre Dame started out fast with Tony Rice surprising the crowd by throwing deep to Raghib Ismail on Notre Dame's first play of scrimmage. On the next drive, Tony Rice optioned left for a 65-yard touchdown play. The Trojans were listless, committing four turnovers, including a back-breaking Rodney Peete interception to Stan Smagala for another Notre Dame touchdown. In the second half, running back Mark Green added the final touchdown of the day(aided by a key 22-yard gain on a 3rd down screen play by Anthony Johnson) to help defeat the Trojans. The sellout crowd of 93,829 was the largest in this rivalry since 1955.

=== Fiesta Bowl ===
1989 Sunkist Fiesta Bowl: #3 West Virginia vs. #1 Notre Dame

Team	1	2	3	4	Total
No. 3 Mountaineers	0	6	7	8	21
• No. 1 Fighting Irish	9	14	3	8	34

- Date: January 2
- Location: Sun Devil Stadium,
  Tempe, AZ
- Game start: 4:30 PM EST
- Game attendance: 74,911
- TV announcers (NBC): Dick Enberg, Merlin Olsen and Reggie Rucker

== Aftermath ==
The 1988 Irish squad won their 11th consensus national title in Lou Holtz's third year as an Irish head coach, equaling the trend of Irish coaches winning the title in their third year. Irish head coaches Frank Leahy, Ara Parseghian and Dan Devine also won titles in their third years as head coach. Holtz was named national coach of the year for taking the Irish squad from an 8–4 record the previous year to national title winners the following year. His 1989 and 1993 squads narrowly missed repeating the feat.

As of 2025, the 1988 Irish squad is also the most recent to win the national title.

== Roster ==
1988 Notre Dame Fighting Irish football team roster
Players
Coaches
Offense

Pos.	#	Name	Class
WR	80	Steve Alaniz	Sr
WR	--	Brad Alge	Sr
OT	72	Joe Allen	So
G	--	Shawn Anderson	Jr
WR	--	Jeff Baker	Fr
OT	--	Norm Balentine	So
RB	39	Braxston Banks	Jr
QB	8	Steve Belles	Sr
RB	--	Walter Boyd	Fr
G	64	Mike Brennan	Sr
RB	40	Tony Brooks	So
OT	71	Dean Brown	Jr
TE	86	Derek Brown	Fr
RB	5	Rodney Culver	Fr
WR	--	Shawn Davis	Fr
WR	--	Mike Denisoff	Jr
WR	--	James Dillard	So
WR	--	Ray Dumas	Sr
WR	13	Pat Eilers	Sr
WR	--	Patrick Fallon	Jr
WR	--	Steve Fortunato	Fr
RB	32	Mike Gatti	Sr
G	61	Tom Gorman	Sr
QB	17	Kent Graham	So
QB	11	Pete Graham	Sr
RB	24	Mark Green	Sr
G	75	Tim Grunhard	Jr
OT	73	Justin Hall	Fr
G	--	Ted Healy	Jr
OT	66	Andy Heck	Sr
C	55	Mike Heldt	So
C	--	Karl Hickey	Fr
WR	--	Chet Hollister	Fr
RB	25	Raghib Ismail	Fr
TE	88	Frank Jacobs	So
RB	41	Joe Jarosz	Sr
RB	22	Anthony Johnson	Jr
OT	--	Chuck Killian	Sr
C	--	Jim Kinsherf	So
OT	--	Lindsay Knapp	Fr
OT	--	Marty Lippincott	Sr
G	--	George Marshall	So
C	76	Gene McGuire	Fr
RB	--	Ted McNamara	Jr
QB	--	Mike Miadich	Fr
RB	35	Ryan Mihalko	So
QB	--	Trevor Moriarty	Fr
C	--	Dave Prinzivalli	Jr
QB	9	Tony Rice	Jr
WR	21	Aaron Robb	Sr
G	52	Tim Ryan	So
G	53	Winston Sandri	So
RB	--	Rusty Setzer	Fr
G	--	Brian Shannon	So
WR	28	Rod Smith	Fr
WR	--	Tony Smith	Fr
RB	--	Kenny Spears	Fr
WR	12	Ricky Watters	So
TE	43	Rod West	Jr
OT	--	Darryl Wodecki	So

Defense

Pos.	#	Name	Class
DE	97	Arnold Ale	Fr
DT	90	Jeff Alm	Jr
CB	--	Jerry Bodine	So
LB	47	Ned Bolcar	Sr
LB	--	Scott Bufton	Sr
DT	--	Mike Callan	So
DT	--	Michael Crounse	Jr
DT	93	Bob Dahl	So
SS	26	Greg Davis	So
DT	--	Marc deManigold	Fr
FS	--	Doug DiOrio	Jr
SS	--	Marc Dobbins	Jr
SS	--	Rich Earley	Jr
LB	--	Joe Farrell	Jr
DT	--	Ted FitzGerald	Jr
DT	92	Bryan Flannery	Jr
DT	--	John Foley	Jr
CB	32	D'Juan Francisco	Sr
DE	38	Flash Gordon	Sr
LB	36	Donn Grimm	So
CB	--	David Jandric	Jr
DE	7	Andre Jones	So
DT	74	Mirko Jurkovic	Fr
DE	37	Scott Kowalkowski	So
CB	--	Antwon Lark	So
CB	1	Todd Lyght	So
DT	--	Bernard Mannelly	Fr
CB	--	Dan McDevitt	Sr
DE	--	Devon McDonald	Fr
DE	--	Kevin McShane	Jr
DT	--	Mark Nigro	Sr
FS	--	George Poorman	Fr
LB	34	Wes Pritchett	Sr
CB	--	Rick Purcell	Jr
LB	--	Troy Ridgely	Fr
DT	--	Steve Roddy	Sr
CB	--	Bob Satterfield	Sr
FS	--	Martin Scruggs	Fr
LB	--	Chris Shey	Jr
CB	29	Stan Smagala	Jr
LB	--	Mike Smalls	Fr
FS	31	Corny Southall	Sr
DE	30	Frank Stams	Sr
LB	42	Mike Stonebreaker	Jr
SS	27	George Streeter	Sr
FS	15	Pat Terrell	Jr
DT	69	George Williams	So
DE	--	Kurt Zackrison	Sr
DT	50	Chris Zorich	So

Special teams

Pos.	#	Name	Class
P	--	Sean Connor	Sr
K	18	Billy Hackett	So
P	14	Pete Hartweger	Sr
K	2	Reggie Ho	Sr
P	--	David Munger	Sr
K	--	Rusty Ranallo	Fr
P	16	Jim Sexton	So

Head coach

- Lou Holtz

Coordinators/assistant coaches

- Barry Alvarez (DC)
- George Stewart (LB)
- Jim Strong (RB)

Legend

- (C) Team captain
- (S) Suspended
- (I) Ineligible
- Injured
- Redshirt

=== Awards and honors ===
All-Americans

Name	AP	UPI	NEA	FC	SN	FW	FN	WCF	CW
Frank Stams, DE	1	1	2		2		1		2
Andy Heck, OT	1	1	1		1		1		2
† Mike Stonebreaker, LB	1	2	1		1	1	1	1	1
Chris Zorich, DT			1				3		
Wes Pritchett, LB					2				
Ricky Watters, FL									2
†denotes consensus selection Source:

Paul "Bear" Bryant Award Coach of the Year

- Lou Holtz

Eddie Robinson Coach of the Year Award

- Lou Holtz

College Football Hall of Fame inductees

Name	Position	Year Inducted
Lou Holtz	Coach	2008
Chris Zorich	Defensive Tackle	2007
Raghib Ismail	Wide Receiver	2019

Notre Dame leads all universities in players inducted.

=== Future NFL players ===
The following is a list of Notre Dame players that would go on to play or be drafted to play in the National Football League over the next four years. All players listed played for the 1988 team.

Name	Year	Team	Round	Pick
Jeff Alm	1990	Houston Oilers	2	41
Ned Bolcar	1990	Seattle Seahawks	6	146
Mike Brennan	1990	Cincinnati Bengals	4	91
Tony Brooks	1992	Philadelphia Eagles	4	92
Dean Brown	1990	Indianapolis Colts	12	316
Derek Brown	1992	New York Giants	1	14
Rodney Culver	1992	Indianapolis Colts	4	85
Bob Dahl	1991	Cincinnati Bengals	3	72
D'Juan Francisco	1990	Washington Redskins	10	262
Mark Green	1989	Chicago Bears	5	130
Tim Grunhard	1990	Kansas City Chiefs	2	40
Andy Heck	1989	Seattle Seahawks	1	15
Mike Heldt	1991	San Diego Chargers	10	257
Raghib Ismail	1991	Los Angeles Raiders	4	100
Anthony Johnson	1990	Indianapolis Colts	2	36
Andre Jones	1991	Pittsburgh Steelers	7	185
Mirko Jurkovic	1992	Chicago Bears	9	246
Scott Kowalkowski	1991	Philadelphia Eagles	8	216
Todd Lyght	1991	Los Angeles Rams	1	5
Gene McGuire	1992	New Orleans Saints	4	95
Wes Pritchett	1989	Miami Dolphins	6	147
Rod Smith	1992	New England Patriots	2	35
Frank Stams	1989	Los Angeles Rams	2	45
Mike Stonebreaker	1991	Chicago Bears		
Pat Terrell	1990	Los Angeles Rams	2	49
Ricky Watters	1991	San Francisco 49ers	2	45
George Williams	1992	Cleveland Browns	6	163
Chris Zorich	1991	Chicago Bears	2	49
Pat Eilers	1990	Minnesota Vikings		
Stan Smagala	1990	Dallas Cowboys		
George Streeter	1989	Chicago Bears		
