= Wes Pritchett =

American football player (born 1966)

Wes Pritchet
No. 34, 51, 50
- Position: Linebacker

Personal information
- Born: July 7, 1966 (age 60); Atlanta, Georgia, U.S.
- Listed height: 6 ft 6 in (1.98 m)
- Listed weight: 251 lb (114 kg)

Career information
- High school: Westminster (GA)
- College: Notre Dame
- NFL draft: 1989: 6th round, 147th overall pick

Career history
- Miami Dolphins (1989)*; Buffalo Bills (1990); Atlanta Falcons (1991); New York/New Jersey Knights (1992)
- * Offseason or practice squad member only

Career NFL statistics
- Games played: 3
- Stats at Pro Football Reference

Wesley Andrew Pritchett (born July 7, 1966) is an American former professional football player who was a linebacker for three seasons in the National Football League (NFL) with the Miami Dolphins, Buffalo Bills, and Atlanta Falcons. He played college football for the Notre Dame Fighting Irish.

== Career ==
Pritchett was linebacker at the University of Notre Dame between 1985 and leading tackler and all-American on their 1988 national championship team. In 1989 he was selected by the Miami Dolphins in the 6th round of the NFL draft. Pritchett then played for the Atlanta Falcons in 1991.

In 1988, an article was published in the New York Times about Pritchett, and two other players, Reggie Ho and Frank Stams, about the effort Lou Holtz made to bolster the team after a coaching change. The team went on to win the 1988 National Championship.

In 2013, ESPN published a story by reporter Jerry Barca about Pritchett and the famed 1989 Fiesta Bowl, in with Notre Dame beating West Virginia 34–21, making then National Champions. The same reporter then wrote a book about the team, which included Pritchett, entitled ‘Unbeatable’ in 2013.

In 2013, the New York Times published an article by reporter Tim Rohan entitled “In ’88, Irish Needed Three ‘Knuckleheads’ to Win Title” which profiled Pritchett.

== Retirement ==
Pritchett retired from professional football in 1992. Pritchett is now a financial advisor.

Pritchett's son, Marshall Pritchett is a tight end for the Alabama Crimson Tide.
