= Tim Grunhard =

American football player and coach (born 1968)

No. 61
- Position: Center

Personal information
- Born: May 17, 1968 (age 58); Chicago, Illinois, U.S.
- Listed height: 6 ft 2 in (1.88 m)
- Listed weight: 315 lb (143 kg)

Career information
- High school: St. Laurence (Burbank, Illinois)
- College: Notre Dame
- NFL draft: 1990: 2nd round, 40th overall pick

Career history

Playing
- Kansas City Chiefs (1990–2000)

Coaching
- Bishop Miege High School (2006–2011) Head coach; Kansas (2012–2013) Offensive line; Bishop Miege High School (2014–present) Offensive line

Awards and highlights
- Pro Bowl (1999); PFWA All-Rookie Team (1990); Kansas City Chiefs Hall of Fame

Career NFL statistics
- Games played: 169
- Games started: 164
- Fumble recoveries: 8
- Stats at Pro Football Reference

Timothy Gerard Grunhard (born May 17, 1968) is an American football coach and former center. A second-round draft choice in the 1990 NFL draft for the Kansas City Chiefs, Grunhard went on to play 169 games with Kansas City, the fourth most ever by a Chiefs offensive lineman.

== College career ==
Grunhard grew up in Chicago, Illinois and attended St. Laurence High School in Burbank. He later moved to South Bend, Indiana where he later played on some of Notre Dame's most successful teams. He started every game in 1988 when the Irish went undefeated and won the national championship. That season included victories over three otherwise undefeated teams: West Virginia in the Fiesta Bowl, USC in a #1 vs. #2 showdown on the final weekend of the regular season, and the 31–30 win over Miami at Notre Dame Stadium that is considered one of the greatest college football games ever played.

== Professional career ==
Grunhard was a second round draft pick of the Kansas City Chiefs in 1990. He was an anchor for the Chiefs' teams of the 1990s, alongside Dave Szott. During that time, he started 164 games for the Chiefs, which ranks third in franchise history. Grunhard made his first and only appearance in the Pro Bowl following the 1999 NFL season after Denver Broncos center Tom Nalen was forced to miss the game due to injury.

== Coaching career ==
=== Bishop Miege (first stint) ===
Grunhard became the head coach of the Bishop Miege High School football team, a Roman Catholic private high school in Roeland Park, Kansas, in 2006. He taught theology. In his first season as coach in 2006, the varsity team finished with a record of 3–6. The team won five straight district titles and the 2009 4A state title in Grunhard's six years of coaching.

=== Kansas ===
In 2012, Grunhard was hired as the offensive line coach at Kansas. In December 2013, he left his position at the University of Kansas in order to be closer to his family in Kansas City.

=== Bishop Miege (second stint) ===
Grunhard returned to Bishop Miege high school as the offensive line coach in 2014.

== Broadcasting ==
Grunhard had a radio show that was on from 9:00 to 11:00 on weekday mornings on KCSP sports radio from October 2003 till he was let go in December 2007. He first did the show with Holden Kushner, and later Doug Franz, but was hosting by himself when released from his contract. His broadcasting career began in 2001 on WHB's "Crunch Time," with co-hosts Bill Maas and Frank Boal.

== Personal life ==
Grunhard's son, Colin, plays center for Kansas. His brother Daniel Charles "Dan" Grunhard played minor league baseball, as high as Triple A.Daughter Cailey qualified for the Olympic trials and held swim records at the University of Notre Dame in the butterfly.
