= Charlie Heck =

American football player (born 1996)

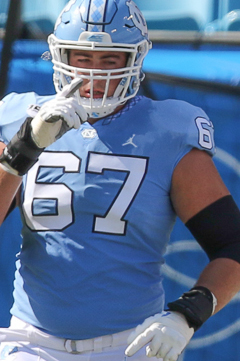
- Heck with the North Carolina Tar Heels in 2019

No. 73 – Indianapolis Colts
- Position: Offensive tackle
- Roster status: Active

Personal information
- Born: November 20, 1996 (age 29); Evanston, Illinois, U.S.
- Listed height: 6 ft 8 in (2.03 m)
- Listed weight: 311 lb (141 kg)

Career information
- High school: Rockhurst (Kansas City, Missouri)
- College: North Carolina (2015–2019)
- NFL draft: 2020: 4th round, 126th overall pick

Career history
- Houston Texans (2020–2023); Arizona Cardinals (2024); San Francisco 49ers (2024); Tampa Bay Buccaneers (2025); Miami Dolphins (2026)*; Indianapolis Colts (2026–present)
- * Offseason or practice squad member only

Career NFL statistics as of 2025
- Games played: 67
- Games started: 29
- Stats at Pro Football Reference

Charlie Heck (born November 20, 1996) is an American professional football offensive tackle for the Indianapolis Colts of the National Football League (NFL). He played college football for the North Carolina Tar Heels.

== College career ==
Playing at Rockhurst High School, Heck committed to University of North Carolina as a tight end on November 30, 2014, choosing the Tar Heels over Indiana, Kansas, Kansas State and others.

After redshirting his freshman season, Heck started some games as a redshirt freshman before becoming a full-time starter during his sophomore season. Heck played at right tackle during his junior season and left tackle during his senior season. After his senior season, Heck participated in the 2020 Senior Bowl and the East-West Shrine Bowl.

== Professional career ==
Pre-draft measurables
Height	Weight	Arm length	Hand span	Wingspan	40-yard dash	10-yard split	20-yard split	20-yard shuttle	Three-cone drill	Vertical jump	Broad jump	Bench press
6 ft 7 5/8 in (2.02 m)	311 lb (141 kg)	34 1/8 in (0.87 m)	10 1/4 in (0.26 m)	6 ft 10 1/4 in (2.09 m)	5.16 s	1.80 s	2.98 s	4.86 s	8.02 s	28.0 in (0.71 m)	9 ft 4 in (2.84 m)	21 reps
All values from NFL Combine

=== Houston Texans ===
Heck was selected by the Houston Texans in the fourth round (126th overall) of the 2020 NFL draft.

Heck was placed on the reserve/PUP list to start the 2023 season. He was activated on November 28.

Heck re-signed with the Texans on March 19, 2024. He was released on August 27.

=== Arizona Cardinals ===
On September 11, 2024, Heck was signed to the Arizona Cardinals' practice squad. He was promoted to the active roster on October 8. Heck was waived by the Cardinals on November 18 and re-signed to the practice squad two days later.

=== San Francisco 49ers ===
On December 25, 2024, Heck was signed by the San Francisco 49ers off the Cardinals practice squad.

=== Tampa Bay Buccaneers ===
On March 17, 2025, Heck signed a one-year, $1.6 million contract with the Tampa Bay Buccaneers.

=== Miami Dolphins ===
On March 16, 2026, Heck signed a one-year $1.2 million contract with the Miami Dolphins. On August 30, he was released by the Dolphins as a part of final roster cuts.

=== Indianapolis Colts ===
On October 29, 2026, Heck signed with the Indianapolis Colts.

== Personal life ==
Charlie's father, Andy Heck, is the offensive line coach for the Kansas City Chiefs, a former NFL offensive lineman for 12 seasons, and an All-American during his college football career at Notre Dame, where he won a National Championship. Charlie's brother, Jon Heck, also played offensive tackle for the University of North Carolina and currently serves as an assistant strength and conditioning coach for the Troy Trojans football team.
