= 1988 Cotton Bowl Classic =

- 52nd Cotton Bowl Classic
- The Cotton Bowl in Dallas, Texas, hosted the Cotton Bowl Classic.
Notre Dame Fighting Irish	Texas A&M Aggies
(8–3)	(9–2)
Independent	SWC
10	35
Head coach: Lou Holtz	Head coach: Jackie Sherrill
AP / Coaches; 12 / 12	AP / Coaches; 13 / 13
	1	2	3	4	Total
Notre Dame	7	3	0	0	10
Texas A&M	3	15	7	10	35
- Date: January 1, 1988
- Season: 1987
- Stadium: Cotton Bowl
- Location: Dallas, Texas
- MVP: LB Adam Bob (Texas A&M); QB Bucky Richardson (Texas A&M)
- Referee: Dick Burleson (SEC)
- Attendance: 73,006

United States TV coverage
- Network: CBS
- Announcers: Brent Musburger and Pat Haden

The 1988 Cotton Bowl Classic was a college football bowl game played on January 1, 1988, at the Cotton Bowl in Dallas, Texas. The bowl game featured the Notre Dame Fighting Irish versus the Texas A&M Aggies. In front of a crowd of 73,006 people, Texas A&M won the game by a final score of 35-10.

== Background ==
Texas A&M won their third straight Southwest Conference championship and as such was invited to their third straight Cotton Bowl. An added bonus to the 1988 Cotton Bowl was Notre Dame's Tim Brown, a Dallas native and the 53rd winner of the Heisman Trophy. Brown's presence marked the third time in four seasons that he played in the Cotton Bowl as a Heisman winner. Although he was the Irish's seventh Heisman winner, he was the first to play in a bowl game. Brown and the Notre Dame football team generated significant buzz and anticipation within the community, and the excitement led right up to the game kick-off.

Notre Dame was making its fifth Cotton Bowl appearance. The Fighting Irish won three of those four, including a 38-10 defeating Texas A&M's archrival, the Texas Longhorns, in the 1978 Cotton Bowl Classic to win the 1977 national championship. In its 1979 Cotton Bowl appearance prior to this one, Joe Montana overcame hypothermia and a 34-12 Houston Cougars lead to win 35-34 with a touchdown on the game's final play.

== Game summary ==
The game commenced with a notable performance by Brown, who returned the opening kickoff for 37 yards, aiding Notre Dame in securing an early lead as quarterback Terry Andrysiak connected with his All-America receiver for a 17-yard scoring pass. Although the A&M responded with Scott Slater's 26-yard field goal at the end of the first quarter, Notre Dame remained in control. Following the kickoff, the Irish embarked on a 51-yard drive that resulted in Ted Gradel's 36-yard field goal, extending their advantage to 10-3.

Notre Dame continued their offensive momentum four minutes later, skillfully advancing from their own 20-yard line. Andrysiak and Brown orchestrated a swift progression, positioning the Irish for a potential score. On second down from the A&M 18-yard line, Andrysiak sought tight end Andy Heck, but A&M's Alex Morris intercepted the pass in the end zone, a pivotal play that shifted the game's dynamics.

Seizing the opportunity, the Aggies launched a relentless assault on the Notre Dame defense, effortlessly traversing 80 yards in a mere six plays to level the score. Freshman running back Darren Lewis, in a surprising turn, executed a 24-yard pass to Tony Thompson for a touchdown. Notre Dame's fortunes worsened when they promptly fumbled the ball to the Aggies, which Tony Jones recovered at the Notre Dame 21-yard line. Four plays later, freshman running back Larry Horton rushed for a two-yard touchdown, supplemented by a successful two-point conversion, propelling the Aggies to an 18-10 halftime lead. Texas A&M maintained their momentum in the second half, with quarterback Bucky Richardson, another talented freshman, securing two additional touchdowns and Slater contributing another successful field goal.

Inspired by the offense, the Aggie defenders began to dominate, creating turnovers that led to four of A&M's six scores. The A&M "Wrecking Crew," featuring linebackers Adam Bob, Aaron Wallace, Dana Batiste, and John Roper, alongside noseguard Sammy O'Brient, stifled the Notre Dame attack. Despite Brown's impressive six catches for 105 yards within the initial 22 minutes, he was subsequently neutralized and failed to make any further receptions after Morris' pivotal interception. In the fourth quarter, Brown was ejected from the game for a personal foul of unsportsmanlike conduct after tackling an Aggie player for taking his towel. It was a decisive victory for A&M, 35-10.

== Aftermath ==
Notre Dame would win the national championship in the Fiesta Bowl a year later, sans Brown, who was drafted by the Oakland Raiders.

A&M was put under probation by the NCAA for a period of two years due to violations and thus could not participate in a bowl game for the 1988 NCAA Division I-A football season. Coach Jackie Sherill left the program after the 1988 season. He was succeeded by R. C. Slocum, who led the team to four subsequent Cotton Bowl appearances, all of which they lost, two of which (the 1993 Cotton Bowl and the 1994 Cotton Bowl) were to Notre Dame. Following multiple coaching changes and two additional Cotton Bowl defeats against future Southeastern Conference rivals, with the assistance of 2012 Heisman Trophy winner Johnny Manziel, A&M eventually emerged triumphant in the 2013 Cotton Bowl .

Notre Dame returned to the Cotton Bowl for a 2018 College Football Playoff semifinal, losing to eventual national champion Clemson 30-3.
