= Jeff Alm =

American football player (1968–1993)

- Alm at Notre Dame

No. 76
- Position: Defensive tackle

Personal information
- Born: March 31, 1968; New York City, New York, U.S.
- Died: December 14, 1993 (aged 25); Houston, Texas, U.S.
- Listed height: 6 ft 6 in (1.98 m)
- Listed weight: 273 lb (124 kg)

Career information
- High school: Carl Sandburg (Orland Park, Illinois)
- College: Notre Dame
- NFL draft: 1990: 2nd round, 41st overall pick

Career history
- Houston Oilers (1990–1993)

Awards and highlights
- Second-team All-American (1989)

Career NFL statistics
- Sacks: 2.5
- Stats at Pro Football Reference

Jeffrey Lawrence Alm (March 31, 1968 – December 14, 1993) was an American professional football defensive tackle for the Houston Oilers of the National Football League (NFL). He played four seasons with the Oilers until his suicide in 1993.

Alm played college football for the Notre Dame Fighting Irish, earning second-team All-American honors in 1989. He was selected by Houston in the second round of the 1990 NFL draft. A backup for most of his career, Alm's death during the 1993 season received national attention when he shot himself following a DUI car crash that killed his friend. His death was noted as one of several incidents to afflict the Oilers that year.

== Early life and college ==
Born in New York City, Alm grew up in Orland Park, Illinois, a southwest suburb of Chicago. He had three siblings and was raised by his mother and stepfather after his biological parents divorced. Alm played for the Carl Sandburg High School football team, earning all-state honors. During his sophomore year, he met Sean P. Lynch, a transfer student, while playing on the football field together. Alm and Lynch eventually became best friends despite their differences in both personality and stature and were inseparable. As Alm's mother, Betty, described: "I always described them as Mutt and Jeff. Sean was so little. They looked so funny together."

Alm eventually earned a football scholarship to Notre Dame. Alm was described by his teammates and friends as introspective and intellectual, completing a degree in marketing. He was praised for his work ethic by teammates, and family and friends described him as having interests outside the sport of football, and perhaps being overwhelmed by the attention he received as an athlete. "He wanted to be accepted for himself and not for what he was doing," said his mother, while his father, Larry, stated, "A lot of people wanted a piece of him. ... Just to get through the day he had to be careful about giving out too many of those pieces. He was not that way growing up but I think he became that way after he became as successful as he did.” His father would also claim, "He never got personally involved in football. ... If he could have made that kind of money doing something else, I think he would have done it.”

As a junior, Alm was a starter for the 1988 Notre Dame team that ended the season as undefeated, 12–0, consensus national champions. Alm contributed 50 tackles and three interceptions to a campaign that saw the Fighting Irish beat four teams top-ten teams, including then-#1 Miami, then-#2 USC on the road, and then-#3 West Virginia in the 1989 Fiesta Bowl.

As a senior, Alm was named to the Associated Press 1989 All-America Second Team as a defensive tackle, owing to a campaign that saw him notch 76 tackles and an interception returned for a touchdown. The Fighting Irish would finish the season #2 in the nation in the AP Poll and 12–1, their only loss occurring on the road to eventual AP National Champions, Miami Hurricanes, and over the course of the season Notre Dame would, again, defeat four teams who were, at time of the game, in the top ten, including a victory over then-#1 Colorado in the 1990 Orange Bowl.

== Professional career ==
Alm was selected by the Houston Oilers with their second-round pick in the 1990 NFL draft. In Alm's final season as an Oiler, he logged 35 tackles, a sack, and a pair of forced fumbles.

Throughout his career, Alm felt lonely in Houston and kept in touch with a handful of close friends from home and college, including Lynch. His final year was marred by a contract holdout and a serious knee injury which had Alm considering the end of his career.

== Car crash and subsequent suicide ==
According to a witness, while Lynch was visiting Alm, the pair had dinner at a Houston-area steakhouse on December 13, 1993. At 2:45 a.m. on the following day, Alm, who was speeding, lost control of his 1993 Cadillac Eldorado heading south on Interstate 610 southbound at the 59 North exit ramp and Lynch, who was not wearing his seatbelt, was ejected from the car. After the crash, Alm ran across the ramp and looked down an embankment towards the Southwest Freeway, discovering that Lynch had been thrown to his death 30 feet below. A distraught Alm took out a pistol-grip shotgun, fired three shots into the air, and then shot himself in the head.

Before his suicide, Alm had made a frantic 911 call to summon help. Alm shouted "Sean are you all right?" at the beginning of the call. In the ensuing moments, he tried to tell the operator the location of the wreck. "Yes, I had an accident on, uh," Alm said. "I had an accident on 59, uh, on 59 north. We're at . . . 59 north. Loop, uh, 610. I have a buddy dying!"

Toxicology reports stated Alm had a blood alcohol level of .14, over the .10 legal limit. Lynch's blood-alcohol level was .30. Alm was also taking the prescription barbiturate Fiorinal, commonly prescribed for tension headaches. According to the report by Joseph A. Jachimczyk, Chief Medical Examiner for Harris County, the barbiturate level was within therapeutic range.

== See also ==
- List of American football players who died during their careers
- 1993 Houston Oilers season
- Josh Brent
