= Ned Bolcar =

American football player (born 1967)

No. 47, 55, 53
- Position: Linebacker

Personal information
- Born: January 12, 1967 (age 59); Phillipsburg, New Jersey, U.S.
- Listed height: 6 ft 1 in (1.85 m)
- Listed weight: 247 lb (112 kg)

Career information
- High school: Phillipsburg
- College: Notre Dame
- NFL draft: 1990: 6th round, 147th overall pick

Career history
- Seattle Seahawks (1990); Miami Dolphins (1991–1992)

Awards and highlights
- 2× Second-team All-American (1987, 1989)

Career NFL statistics
- Interceptions: 1
- Stats at Pro Football Reference

Ned Francis Bolcar (born January 12, 1967) is an American former professional football player who was a linebacker in the National Football League (NFL). He played three seasons in the National Football League (NFL), one with the Seattle Seahawks and two with the Miami Dolphins.

A native of Lopatcong Township, New Jersey who played at Phillipsburg High School, Bolcar was a 1984 USA Today High School All-American selection.

He played college football for the Notre Dame Fighting Irish, twice earning second-team All-American (1987, 1989) honors. He captained their 1988 national championship team.

Bolcar was a sixth-round selection in the 1990 NFL draft by the Seattle Seahawks.
