= 1988 West Virginia Mountaineers football team =

American college football season

1988 West Virginia Mountaineers football

Eastern champion

Fiesta Bowl, L 21–34 vs. Notre Dame
- Conference: Independent

Ranking
- Coaches: No. 5
- AP: No. 5
- Record: 11–1
- Head coach: Don Nehlen (9th season)
- Offensive scheme: Option
- Home stadium: Mountaineer Field

1988 Major eastern college football independents records
	Conf.					Overall
Team	W		L		T	W		L		T
No. 5 West Virginia $	5	–	0	–	0	11	–	1	–	0
No. 13 Syracuse	5	–	1	–	0	10	–	2	–	0
Pittsburgh	3	–	3	–	0	6	–	5	–	0
Temple	2	–	3	–	0	4	–	7	–	0
Rutgers	2	–	4	–	0	5	–	6	–	0
Penn State	2	–	4	–	0	5	–	6	–	0
Boston College	1	–	5	–	0	3	–	8	–	0
$ – Lambert Trophy Winner; Rankings from AP Poll

1988 NCAA Division I-A independents football records
	Conf.					Overall
Team	W		L		T	W		L		T
No. 1 Notre Dame		–		–		12	–	0	–	0
No. 2 Miami (FL)		–		–		11	–	1	–	0
No. 3 Florida State		–		–		11	–	1	–	0
No. 5 West Virginia		–		–		11	–	1	–	0
Southern Miss		–		–		10	–	2	–	0
No. 13 Syracuse		–		–		10	–	2	–	0
Army		–		–		9	–	3	–	0
Louisville		–		–		8	–	3	–	0
South Carolina		–		–		8	–	4	–	0
Northern Illinois		–		–		7	–	4	–	0
Pittsburgh		–		–		6	–	5	–	0
Memphis State		–		–		6	–	5	–	0
Southwestern Louisiana		–		–		6	–	5	–	0
Rutgers		–		–		5	–	6	–	0
Akron		–		–		5	–	6	–	0
Penn State		–		–		5	–	6	–	0
Tulane		–		–		5	–	6	–	0
Temple		–		–		4	–	7	–	0
Tulsa		–		–		4	–	7	–	0
Boston College		–		–		3	–	8	–	0
Cincinnati		–		–		3	–	8	–	0
East Carolina		–		–		3	–	8	–	0
Navy		–		–		3	–	8	–	0
Virginia Tech		–		–		3	–	8	–	0
Rankings from AP Poll

The 1988 West Virginia Mountaineers football team represented West Virginia University as an independent during the 1988 NCAA Division I-A football season. Led by ninth-year head coach Don Nehlen, the Mountaineers compiled a record of 11–1 with a loss to Notre Dame in the Fiesta Bowl, which decided the national championship. West Virginia played home games at Mountaineer Field in Morgantown, West Virginia.

== Schedule ==
Date	Time	Opponent	Rank	Site	TV	Result	Attendance	Source
September 3	1:00 p.m.	Bowling Green	No. 16	Mountaineer Field; Morgantown, WV		W 62–14	53,515	
September 10	1:00 p.m.	Cal State Fullerton	No. 12	Mountaineer Field; Morgantown, WV		W 45–10	54,169	
September 17	12:00 p.m.	Maryland	No. 12	Mountaineer Field; Morgantown, WV (rivalry)	JPT	W 55–24	60,188	
September 24	12:00 p.m.	at No. 16 Pittsburgh	No. 11	Pitt Stadium; Pittsburgh, PA (Backyard Brawl)	JPT	W 31–10	55,978	
October 1	1:00 p.m.	at Virginia Tech	No. 7	Lane Stadium; Blacksburg, VA (rivalry)		W 22–10	50,231	
October 8	2:00 p.m.	at East Carolina	No. 7	Ficklen Memorial Stadium; Greenville, NC		W 30–10	33,786	
October 22	1:00 p.m.	Boston College^{†}	No. 6	Mountaineer Field; Morgantown, WV		W 59–19	63,145	
October 29	2:30 p.m.	Penn State	No. 7	Mountaineer Field; Morgantown, WV (rivalry)	CBS	W 51–30	66,811	
November 5	1:30 p.m.	at Cincinnati	No. 4	Riverfront Stadium; Cincinnati, OH		W 51–13	21,511	
November 12	1:00 p.m.	at Rutgers	No. 4	Giants Stadium; East Rutherford, NJ		W 35–25	32,517	
November 19	6:00 p.m.	No. 14 Syracuse	No. 4	Mountaineer Field; Morgantown, WV (rivalry)	ESPN	W 31–9	65,127	
January 2	5:00 p.m.	vs. No. 1 Notre Dame	No. 3	Sun Devil Stadium; Tempe, AZ (Fiesta Bowl)	NBC	L 21–34	74,911	
^{†}Homecoming; Rankings from AP Poll released prior to the game; Source:

== Rankings ==
Ranking movements Legend: ██ Increase in ranking ██ Decrease in ranking RV = Received votes ( ) = First-place votes
	Week																
Poll	Pre	1	2	3	4	5	6	7	8	9	10	11	12	13	14	15	Final
AP	16	16	12	12	11	7	7	6	6	7	4 (2)	4 (1)	4	4 (2)	3 (2)	3 (3)	5
Coaches	RV	RV	13	11	10	6	6	5	5	6	4 (2)	4 (2)	4 (2)	4 (2)	3 (4)	3 (3)	5

== Season summary ==
The 1987 season was the beginning of Major Harris as the starting quarterback for West Virginia. Only a redshirt-freshman, Harris led the Mountaineers to a Sun Bowl berth, after a 1–3 start.

The '88 season opened with coach Don Nehlen's alma mater, Bowling Green. The win marked the beginning of the run, winning 62–14. West Virginia beat their next opponent, Cal-Fullerton, 45–10. West Virginia's first challenge was against the Maryland Terrapins. West Virginia got behind the Terps 14–0, but pulled away at halftime, winning 55–24.

West Virginia's next game was at the Pittsburgh Panthers. The game was a defensive struggle, until running back A.B. Brown, a Pitt transfer, ran a draw for 64-yards and the score. Scoring 14-points in the fourth quarter, the Mountaineers broke away. In the 1988 Backyard Brawl, West Virginia was installed as a one-point underdog by the odds makers. The Mountaineers rolled to a 31–10 victory over Pitt on the way to their first undefeated, untied regular season in school history. West Virginia then traveled to rival Virginia Tech, and won 22–10, even though they produced four fumbles in the game. The next two games, a win at East Carolina, and a 59-point win at Boston College, gave West Virginia a 7–0 record.

Next, the late October matchup vs Penn State at Mountaineer Field is widely regarded as one of the greatest games in Mountaineer football history. Before a nationwide CBS audience, the Mountaineers were up 34–8 before the half. On a draw play, runningback Undra Johnson ran 55 yards for the touchdown to end the half. The game also included a touchdown run by Major Harris, which is remembered in West Virginia lore as "The Run".

The next game was at the Cincinnati Bearcats, where the Mountaineers started slow in the first half. Receiver Reggie Rembert scored three times, and the Mountaineers won by scoring 24 points in the third quarter. The Mountaineers traveled to Giants Stadium to play Rutgers, who had beat Penn St., Boston College, and Michigan State. The Mountaineers played poor, but came out with the win.

The final regular season game of the season was at home, against the Syracuse Orangemen. The Orangemen were 8–2, while the Mountaineers were 10–0. The highlight of the game was a 49-yard interception by Willie Edwards that was taken for a touchdown. The Mountaineers won 31–9, and took a famous lap around the stadium to entertain the 65,000 fans in Morgantown.

=== National championship ===
West Virginia traveled to the Fiesta Bowl to play the only other undefeated team in the NCAA, the Notre Dame Fighting Irish. Free-safety Darrell Whitmore was out for the Mountaineers, but Nehlen moved star Bo Orlando from strong safety to free to fill the hole. Nehlen recalled the move as "our first mistake...". "Another mistake I made is that I let the media overrun us."

West Virginia's offense was doomed from the third play of the game. Major Harris separated his shoulder on the third play when he was slammed to the ground by Irish Linebacker Michael Stonebreaker. He couldn't throw well for the rest of the game. The WVU coaches also abandoned their plans to run a lot of option football out of fear of further injuring Harris. Linemen John Stroia and Bob Kovach were injured for the Mountaineers in that game as well. NG Jim Gray would also suffer an early injury in the game. Notre Dame completely dominated the game. West Virginia only made one serious threat. Willie Edwards picked off a Tony Rice pass in the 3rd quarter. ND led by 13 points at the time. A Harris incompletion and two ND sacks took WVU out of field goal range, and the threat was over. ND opened up a 21-point lead before a late WVU touchdown made the score respectable. WVU lost 34–21, it was their first loss of the season for the national championship.

== Game summaries ==
=== Vs. Bowling Green ===
Bowling Green Falcons at No. 16 West Virginia Mountaineers – Game summary

Quarter	1	2	3	4	Total
Falcons	0	7	0	7	14
No. 16 Mountaineers	24	17	7	14	62

at Mountaineer Field, Morgantown, WV

- Date: September 3
- Game time: 1:00 p.m.
- Game weather: Temperature: 84 °F (29 °C) • Weather: Cloudy • Wind: 9 MPH
- Game attendance: 53,515

Game information

First quarter

- 13:45 WVU TD - Willie Edwards 0-yard fumble return (Baumann PAT)
- 10:00 WVU FG - Charlie Baumann 41-yard field goal
- 6:09 WVU TD - Anthony "A.B" Brown 4-yard run (Baumann PAT)
- 1:32 WVU TD - Craig Taylor 9-yard run (Baumann PAT)

Second quarter

- 13:40 WVU TD - Reggie Rembert 6-yard pass from Major Harris (Baumann PAT)
- 6:49 WVU TD - Major Harris 5-yard run (Baumann PAT)
- 2:35 BGSU TD - Mike McGee 1-yard run (Zeller PAT)
- 1:26 WVU FG - Charlie Baumann 47-yard field goal

Third quarter

- 6:41 WVU TD - Eugene Napoleon 1-yard run (Baumann PAT)

Fourth quarter

- 13:03 WVU TD - Undra Johnson 6-yard run (Baumann PAT)
- 7:32 WVU TD - Barry Browning 2-yard run (Baumann PAT)
- 0:06 BGSU TD - Mike McGee 1-yard run (Zeller PAT)

Top passers

- WVU – Major Harris: 6/9, 90 yards, TD
- BGSU – Jett Duffey: 11/33, 128 yards, INT

Top rushers

- WVU – Major Harris: 7 carries, 73 yards, 1 TD
- BGSU – Mike McGee: 16 carries, 56 yards, 2 TD

Top receivers

- WVU – Reggie Rembert: 4 receptions, 53 yards, 1 TD
- BGSU – Ken Rankin: 3 receptions, 46 yards

Statistics

Statistics	West Virginia	Bowling Green
First downs	25	21
Total yards	541	267
Rushing yards	367	61
Passing yards	174	206
Turnovers	1	2
Time of possession	29:41	30:19

=== Vs. Cal State Fullerton ===
Cal State Fullerton Titans at No. 12 West Virginia Mountaineers – Game summary

Quarter	1	2	3	4	Total
Titans	0	0	0	10	10
No. 12 Mountaineers	3	21	14	7	45

at Mountaineer Field, Morgantown, WV

- Date: September 10
- Game time: 1:00 p.m.
- Game weather: Temperature: 74 °F (23 °C) • Weather: Sunny • Wind: 7 MPH
- Game attendance: 54,196

Game information

First quarter

- 5:52 WVU FG - Charlie Baumann 28-yard field goal

Second quarter

- 11:33 WVU TD - Anthony "A.B" Brown 1-yard run (Baumann PAT)
- 8:44 WVU TD - Undra Johnson 1-yard run (Baumann PAT)
- 3:38 WVU TD - Anthony "A.B" Brown 1-yard run (Baumann PAT)

Third quarter

- 3:18 WVU TD - Undra Johnson 1-yard run (Baumann PAT)
- 1:49 WVU TD - Calvin Phillips 37-yard pass from Greg Jones (Baumann PAT)

Fourth quarter

- 9:58 CSUF FG - Stan Lambert 29-yard field goal
- 6:16 WVU TD - Tim Williams 1-yard run (Baumann PAT)
- 0:51 CSUF TD - John Gibbs 12-yard pass from Carlos Siragusa (Lambert PAT)

Top passers

- WVU – Major Harris: 7/11, 166 yards, INT
- CSUF – Dan Speltz: 5/12, 44 yards, TD

Top rushers

- WVU – Anthony "A.B." Brown: 24 carries, 95 yards, 2 TD
- CSUF – Mike Pringle: 19 carries, 100 yards

Top receivers

- WVU – Calvin Phillips: 5 receptions, 190 yards, TD
- CSUF – Rocky Palamara: 2 receptions, 28 yards

Statistics

Statistics	West Virginia	Cal State Fullerton
First downs	23	9
Total yards	514	175
Rushing yards	226	119
Passing yards	188	56
Turnovers	2	2
Time of possession	30:45	29:15

=== Vs. Maryland ===
Maryland Terrapins at No. 12 West Virginia Mountaineers – Game summary

Quarter	1	2	3	4	Total
Terrapins	14	7	3	0	24
No. 12 Mountaineers	7	17	10	21	55

at Mountaineer Field, Morgantown, WV

- Date: September 17
- Game time: Noon
- Game weather: Temperature: 66 °F (19 °C) • Weather: Light rain and fog • Wind: 5 MPH
- Game attendance: 60,188
- TV announcers (JP Sports): Steve Martin (play-by-play), Bob Casciola (color commentator)

Game information

First quarter

- 14:04 UM TD - Mike Beasley 11-yard run (Plocki PAT)
- 10:58 UM TD - Mike Beasley 74-yard run (Plocki PAT)
- 3:35 WVU TD - Undra Johnson 4-yard run (Baumann PAT)

Second quarter

- 13:46 WVU TD - Keith Winn 20-yard pass from Major Harris (Baumann PAT)
- 9:51 WVU FG - Charlie Baumann 39-yard field goal
- 0:49 UM TD - Neil O'Donnell 7-yard run (Plocki PAT)
- 0:08 WVU TD - Major Harris 3-yard run (Baumann PAT)

Third quarter

- 12:38 WVU FG - Charlie Baumann 41-yard field goal
- 7:57 UM FG - Dan Plocki 45-yard field goal
- 2:37 WVU TD - Anthony "A.B." Brown 5-yard run (Baumann PAT)

Fourth quarter

- 14:40 WVU TD - Craig Taylor 1-yard run (Baumann PAT)
- 9:42 WVU TD - Bo Orlando 58-yard interception return (Baumann PAT)
- 1:19 WVU TD - Reggie Rembert 5-yard run (Baumann PAT)

Top passers

- WVU – Major Harris: 6/11, 150 yards, TD, INT
- UM – Neil O'Donnell: 4/13, 71 yards, 2 INT

Top rushers

- WVU – Anthony "A.B." Brown: 17 carries, 89 yards, TD
- UM – Mike Beasley: 7 carries, 95 yards, 2 TD

Top receivers

- WVU – Jamie LeMon: 3 receptions, 65 yards
- UM – Ricky Johnson: 3 receptions, 16 yards

Statistics

Statistics	West Virginia	Maryland
First downs	28	14
Total yards	540	287
Rushing yards	347	188
Passing yards	193	99
Turnovers	3	4
Time of possession	31:36	28:24

=== At Pittsburgh ===
No. 11 West Virginia Mountaineers at No. 16 Pittsburgh Panthers – Game summary

Quarter	1	2	3	4	Total
No. 11 Mountaineers	10	0	7	14	31
No. 16 Panthers	0	7	3	0	10

at Pitt Stadium, Pittsburgh, PA

- Date: September 24
- Game time: Noon
- Game weather: Temperature: 65 °F (18 °C) • Weather: Cloudy • Wind: 10-15 MPH
- Game attendance: 55,978
- TV announcers (JP Sports): Steve Martin (play-by-play), Bob Casciola (color commentator)

Game information

First quarter

- 5:20 WVU TD - Reggie Rembert 33-yard pass from Major Harris (Baumann PAT)
- 2:49 WVU FG - Charlie Baumann 31-yard field goal

Second quarter

- 8:31 PITT TD - Henry Tuten 23-yard pass from Darnell Dickerson (Kaplan PAT)

Third quarter

- 10:23 WVU TD - Anthony "A.B." Brown 64-yard run (Baumann PAT)
- 5:04 PITT FG - Scott Kaplan 34-yard field goal

Fourth quarter

- 14:06 WVU TD - Undra Johnson 20-yard run (Baumann PAT)
- 2:41 WVU TD - Craig Taylor 1-yard run (Baumann PAT)

Top passers

- WVU – Major Harris: 5/12, 61 yards, TD, INT
- PITT – Darnell Dickerson: 12/25, 150 yards, TD, INT

Top rushers

- WVU – Anthony "A.B." Brown: 17 carries, 110 yards, TD
- PITT – Adam Walker: 17 carries, 39 yards

Top receivers

- WVU – Reggie Rembert: 2 receptions, 45 yards, TD
- PITT – Henry Tuten: 7 receptions, 103 yards, TD

Statistics

Statistics	West Virginia	Pittsburgh
First downs	19	16
Total yards	322	257
Rushing yards	261	81
Passing yards	61	176
Turnovers	1	3
Time of possession	27:03	32:57

=== At Virginia Tech ===
No. 7 West Virginia Mountaineers at Virginia Tech Hokies – Game summary

Quarter	1	2	3	4	Total
No. 7 Mountaineers	9	3	3	7	22
Hokies	0	3	7	0	10

at Lane Stadium, Blacksburg, VA

- Date: October 1
- Game time: 1:00 p.m.
- Game weather: Temperature: 73 °F (23 °C) • Weather: Sunny, clear • Wind: 5 MPH SW
- Game attendance: 50,231
- Referee: C.C. Dailey

Game information

First quarter

- 9:49 WVU TD - Craig Taylor 8-yard run (Baumann failed)
- 3:00 WVU FG - Charlie Baumann 19-yard field goal

Second quarter

- 14:20 WVU FG - Charlie Baumann 37-yard field goal
- 7:05 VT FG - Chris Kinzer 28-yard field goal

Third quarter

- 11:09 WVU FG - Charlie Baumann 29-yard field goal
- 2:29 VT TD - Jock Jones 0-yard fumble return (Kinzer PAT)

Fourth quarter

- 10:11 WVU TD - Anthony "A.B." Brown 5-yard run (Baumann PAT)

Top passers

- WVU – Major Harris: 12/21, 205 yards, 2 INT
- VT – Will Furrer: 5/21, 39 yards, INT

Top rushers

- WVU – Anthony "A.B." Brown: 23 carries, 191 yards, TD
- VT – Ralph Brown: 19 carries, 73 yards

Top receivers

- WVU – Jamie LeMon: 4 receptions, 51 yards
- VT – Lamar Smith: 2 receptions, 2 yards

Statistics

Statistics	West Virginia	Virginia Tech
First downs	22	8
Total yards	518	194
Rushing yards	313	107
Passing yards	205	87
Turnovers	6	1
Time of possession	33:33	26:27

=== At East Carolina ===
No. 7 West Virginia Mountaineers at East Carolina Pirates – Game summary

Quarter	1	2	3	4	Total
No. 7 Mountaineers	10	7	6	7	30
Pirates	0	10	0	0	10

at Dowdy–Ficklen Stadium, Greenville, NC

- Date: October 8
- Game time: 2:00 p.m.
- Game weather: Temperature: 63 °F (17 °C) • Weather: Sunny and cool • Wind: 10 MPH
- Game attendance: 33,786

Game information

First quarter

- 9:31 WVU FG - Charlie Baumann 49-yard field goal
- 2:38 WVU TD - Undra Johnson 5-yard run (Baumann PAT)

Second quarter

- 13:26 WVU TD - Adrian Moss 18-yard pass from Major Harris (Baumann PAT)
- 7:00 ECU FG - Robb Imperato 22-yard field goal
- 0:14 ECU TD - Walter Wilson 33-yard pass from Travis Hunter (Imperato PAT)

Third quarter

- 1:46 WVU TD - Undra Johnson 26-yard run (Baumann failed)

Fourth quarter

- 13:25 WVU TD - Major Harris 1-yard run (Baumann PAT)

Top passers

- WVU – Major Harris: 8/12, 126 yards, TD
- ECU – Charlie Libretto: 8/22, 88 yards, 2 INT

Top rushers

- WVU – Undra Johnson: 25 carries, 167 yards, 2 TD
- ECU – Tim James: 15 carries, 50 yards

Top receivers

- WVU – Adrian Moss: 5 receptions, 85 yards, TD
- ECU – Walter Wilson: 4 receptions, 91 yards, TD

Statistics

Statistics	West Virginia	East Carolina
First downs	21	18
Total yards	390	310
Rushing yards	264	127
Passing yards	126	187
Turnovers	3	2
Time of possession	27:49	32:11

=== Vs. Boston College ===
Boston College Eagles at No. 6 West Virginia Mountaineers – Game summary

Quarter	1	2	3	4	Total
Eagles	9	3	7	0	19
No. 6 Mountaineers	7	17	14	21	59

at Mountaineer Field, Morgantown, WV

- Date: October 22
- Game time: 1:00 p.m.
- Game weather: Temperature: 43 °F (6 °C) • Weather: Cloudy, rainy • Wind: 15 MPH
- Game attendance: 63,145

Game information

First quarter

- 11:18 WVU TD - Craig Taylor 16-yard run (Baumann PAT)
- 7:38 BC FG - Brian Lowe 36-yard field goal
- 3:51 BC TD - Ed Toner 37-yard run (pass failed)

Second quarter

- 9:51 WVU TD - Undra Johnson 6-yard pass from Major Harris (Baumann PAT)
- 6:39 BC FG - Brian Lowe 32-yard field goal
- 2:53 WVU TD - Grantis Bell 61-yard pass from Major Harris (Baumann PAT)
- 0:08 WVU FG - Charlie Baumann 28-yard field goal

Third quarter

- 13:30 WVU TD - Major Harris 9-yard run (Baumann PAT)
- 6:57 BC TD - Mike Sanders 14-yard run (Lowe PAT)
- 4:09 WVU TD - Undra Johnson 1-yard run (Baumann PAT)

Fourth quarter

- 14:29 WVU TD - Major Harris 13-yard run (Baumann PAT)
- 7:24 WVU TD - Reggie Rembert 33-yard pass from Major Harris (Baumann PAT)
- 3:07 WVU TD - Jamie LeMon 24-yard pass from Greg Jones (Baumann PAT)

Top passers

- WVU – Major Harris: 15/21, 297 yards, 3 TD, INT
- BC – Michael Power: 12/29, 155 yards, INT

Top rushers

- WVU – Undra Johnson: 23 carries, 111 yards, TD
- BC – Mike Sanders: 23 carries, 142 yards, TD

Top receivers

- WVU – Calvin Phillips: 4 receptions, 83 yards
- BC – Tom Waddle: 6 receptions, 62 yards

Statistics

Statistics	West Virginia	Boston College
First downs	29	24
Total yards	575	363
Rushing yards	254	164
Passing yards	321	199
Turnovers	3	2
Time of possession	28:23	31:37

=== Vs. Penn State ===
Penn State Nittany Lions at No. 7 West Virginia Mountaineers – Game summary

Quarter	1	2	3	4	Total
Nittany Lions	0	8	6	16	30
No. 7 Mountaineers	14	27	0	10	51

at Mountaineer Field, Morgantown, WV

- Date: October 29
- Game time: 2:30 p.m.
- Game weather: Temperature: 49 °F (9 °C) • Weather: Sunny and pleasant • Wind: 10 MPH
- Game attendance: 66,811
- TV announcers (CBS): Brent Musburger (play-by-play), Pat Haden (color commentator) and John Dockery (sideline reporter)

Game information

First quarter

- 13:17 WVU TD - Major Harris 26-yard run (Baumann PAT)
- 6:42 WVU TD - Reggie Rembert 40-yard pass from Major Harris (Baumann PAT)

Second quarter

- 12:06 WVU FG - Charlie Baumann 24-yard field goal
- 9:20 WVU TD - Calvin Phillips 49-yard pass from Major Harris (Baumann PAT)
- 6:55 PSU TD - Sam Gash 3-yard run (Davis pass good)
- 2:45 WVU TD - Craig Taylor 2-yard run (Baumann PAT)
- 1:01 WVU FG - Charlie Baumann 24-yard field goal
- 0:03 WVU TD - Undra Johnson 55-yard run (Baumann PAT)

Third quarter

- 4:55 PSU TD - Sam Gash 3-yard run (Sacca pass failed)

Fourth quarter

- 13:13 WVU FG - Charlie Baumann 39-yard field goal
- 7:44 PSU TD - Lance Longeran 12-yard run (Smith pass good)
- 2:32 WVU TD - Terry Smith 40-yard pass from Lance Longeran (Brown run good)
- 1:31 WVU TD - Eugene Napoleon 69-yard run (Baumann PAT)

Top passers

- WVU – Major Harris: 12/20, 230 yards, 2 TD
- PSU – Lance Longeran: 6/9, 129 yards, TD

Top rushers

- WVU – Undra Johnson: 13 carries, 105 yards, TD
- PSU – Gary Brown: 19 carries, 76 yards

Top receivers

- WVU – Calvin Phillips: 4 receptions, 114 yards, TD
- PSU – Terry Smith: 4 receptions, 84 yards, TD

Statistics

Statistics	West Virginia	Penn State
First downs	25	25
Total yards	563	393
Rushing yards	322	200
Passing yards	241	193
Turnovers	0	3
Time of possession	29:26	30:34

=== At Cincinnati ===
No. 4 West Virginia Mountaineers at Cincinnati Bearcats – Game summary

Quarter	1	2	3	4	Total
No. 4 Mountaineers	14	10	24	3	51
Bearcats	6	7	0	0	13

at Riverfront Stadium, Cincinnati, OH

- Date: November 5
- Game time: 1:30 p.m.
- Game weather: Temperature: 49 °F (9 °C) • Weather: wet, threat of rain • Wind: 15 MPH
- Game attendance: 21,511

Game information

First quarter

- 11:34 UC FG - Phil Insalaco 36-yard field goal
- 8:36 WVU TD - Reggie Rembert 14-yard pass from Major Harris (Baumann PAT)
- 6:12 WVU TD - Grantis Bell 40-yard pass from Major Harris (Baumann PAT)
- 0:37 WVU FG - Phil Insalaco 25-yard field goal

Second quarter

- 11:23 WVU FG - Charlie Baumann 42-yard field goal
- 7:33 UC TD - Leonard Cry 16-yard pass from Don Hoog (Insalaco PAT)
- 0:42 WVU TD - Reggie Rembert 68-yard pass from Major Harris (Baumann PAT)

Third quarter

- 13:45 WVU TD - Anthony "A.B." Brown 41-yard run (Baumann PAT)
- 6:45 WVU TD - Reggie Rembert 51-yard run (Baumann PAT)
- 4:45 WVU FG - Charlie Baumann 35-yard field goal
- 2:46 WVU TD - Jamie LeMon 15-yard pass from Greg Jones (Baumann PAT)

Fourth quarter

- 3:05 WVU FG - Charlie Baumann 27-yard field goal

Top passers

- WVU – Major Harris: 6/13, 180 yards, 3 TD, INT
- UC – Don Hoog: 11/25, 96 yards, TD, 2 INT

Top rushers

- WVU – Anthony "A.B." Brown: 15 carries, 70 yards, TD
- UC – Al McKinney: 26 carries, 116 yards

Top receivers

- WVU – Calvin Phillips: 3 receptions, 77 yards
- UC – Roosevelt Mukes: 3 receptions, 39 yards

Statistics

Statistics	West Virginia	Cincinnati
First downs	23	20
Total yards	498	304
Rushing yards	269	205
Passing yards	229	99
Turnovers	2	4
Time of possession	28:09	31:51

=== At Rutgers ===
No. 4 West Virginia Mountaineers at Rutgers Scarlet Knights – Game summary

Quarter	1	2	3	4	Total
No. 4 Mountaineers	7	14	7	7	35
Scarlet Knights	7	3	3	12	25

at Giants Stadium, East Rutherford, NJ

- Date: November 12
- Game time: 1:00 p.m.
- Game weather: Temperature: 47 °F (8 °C) • Weather: Sunny • Wind: 6 MPH
- Game attendance: 32,517

Game information

First quarter

- 13:56 WVU TD - Darrell Whitmore 34-yard interception return (Baumann PAT)
- 13:43 RU TD - Ron Allen 92-yard kickoff return (Sclafani PAT)

Second quarter

- 7:06 RU FG - Carmen Sclafani 35-yard field goal
- 6:10 WVU TD - Reggie Rembert 48-yard pass from Major Harris (Baumann PAT)
- 1:31 WVU TD - Undra Johnson 2-yard run (Baumann PAT)

Third quarter

- 9:03 RU FG - Carmen Sclafani 40-yard field goal
- 4:40 WVU TD - Craig Taylor 1-yard run (Baumann PAT)

Fourth quarter

- 13:09 WVU TD - Craig Taylor 18-yard run (Baumann PAT)
- 7:33 RU TD - Michael Botti 2-yard run (Tarver run failed)
- 0:35 RU TD - Vince Hall 3-yard pass from Tom Tarver (Tarver pass failed)

Top passers

- WVU – Major Harris: 7/14, 130 yards, TD
- RU – Tom Tarver: 9/12, 131 yards, TD

Top rushers

- WVU – Anthony "A.B." Brown: 22 carries, 111 yards
- RU – Michael Botti: 23 carries, 75 yards, TD

Top receivers

- WVU – Calvin Phillips: 2 receptions, 29 yards
- RU – Michael Botti: 3 receptions, 18 yards

Statistics

Statistics	West Virginia	Rutgers
First downs	22	16
Total yards	423	284
Rushing yards	293	87
Passing yards	130	197
Turnovers	1	4
Time of possession	29:28	30:32

=== Vs. Syracuse ===
No. 14 Syracuse Orangemen at No. 4 West Virginia Mountaineers – Game summary

Quarter	1	2	3	4	Total
No. 14 Orangemen	0	3	0	6	9
No. 4 Mountaineers	7	7	7	10	31

at Mountaineer Field, Morgantown, WV

- Date: November 19
- Game time: 6:00 p.m.
- Game weather: Temperature: 49 °F (9 °C) • Weather: Rainy • Wind: no wind
- Game attendance: 65,127
- TV announcers (ESPN): Denny Schreiner (play-by-play), Stan White (color commentator), John Snyder (sideline reporter)

Game information

First quarter

- 8:52 WVU TD - Craig Taylor 3-yard run (Baumann PAT)

Second quarter

- 7:56 SU FG - Kevin Greene 43-yard field goal
- 1:07 WVU TD - Craig Taylor 1-yard run (Baumann PAT)

Third quarter

- 8:34 WVU TD - Willie Edwards 49-yard interception return (Baumann PAT)

Fourth quarter

- 10:10 WVU FG - Charlie Baumann 28-yard field goal
- 5:49 WVU TD - Undra Johnson 1-yard run (Baumann PAT)
- 3:41 SU TD - Robert Moore 16-yard pass from Todd Philcox (Philcox pass failed)

Top passers

- WVU – Major Harris: 8/16, 114 yards
- SU – Todd Philcox: 11/22, 121 yards, TD, 4 INT

Top rushers

- WVU – Anthony "A.B." Brown: 19 carries, 103 yards
- SU – Daryl Johnston: 10 carries, 79 yards

Top receivers

- WVU – Keith Winn: 3 receptions, 44 yards
- SU – Deval Glover: 4 receptions, 51 yards

Statistics

Statistics	West Virginia	Syracuse
First downs	24	19
Total yards	426	316
Rushing yards	312	189
Passing yards	114	127
Turnovers	1	6
Time of possession	32:08	27:52

=== Vs. Notre Dame (Sunkist Fiesta Bowl) ===
Sunkist Fiesta Bowl: No. 3 West Virginia Mountaineers vs. No. 1 Notre Dame Fighting Irish – Game summary

Quarter	1	2	3	4	Total
No. 3 Mountaineers	0	6	7	8	21
No. 1 Fighting Irish	9	14	3	8	34

at Sun Devil Stadium, Tempe, AZ

- Date: January 2
- Game time: 1:00 p.m.
- Game weather: Temperature: 55 °F (13 °C) • Weather: Cloudy, light rain • Wind: 5 MPH
- Game attendance: 74,911
- TV announcers (NBC): Dick Enberg (play-by-play), Merlin Olsen (color commentator), Reggie Rucker (sideline reporter)

Game information

First quarter

- 10:25 ND FG - Billy Hackett 45-yard field goal
- 4:34 ND TD - Anthony Johnson 1-yard run (Graham rush failed)

Second quarter

- 9:41 ND TD - Rodney Culver 5-yard run (Ho PAT)
- 6:18 WVU FG - Charlie Baumann 29-yard field goal
- 1:48 ND TD - Raghib Ismail 29-yard pass from Tony Rice (Ho PAT)
- 0:00 WVU FG - Charlie Baumann 31-yard field goal

Third quarter

- 5:34 ND FG - Reggie Ho 32-yard field goal
- 3:36 WVU TD - Grantis Bell 17-yard pass from Major Harris (Baumann PAT)

Fourth quarter

- 13:05 ND TD - Frank Jacobs 3-yard run (Rice rush good)
- 1:14 WVU TD - Reggie Rembert 3-yard run (Rembert pass good)

Top passers

- WVU – Major Harris: 13/26, 166 yards, TD, INT
- ND – Tony Rice: 7/11, 213 yards, 2 TD, INT

Top rushers

- WVU – Anthony "A.B." Brown: 11 carries, 49 yards
- ND – Tony Rice: 13 carries, 75 yards

Top receivers

- WVU – Grantis Bell: 4 receptions, 44 yards, TD
- ND – Derek Brown: 2 receptions, 70 yards

Statistics

Statistics	West Virginia	Notre Dame
First downs	19	19
Total yards	282	455
Rushing yards	108	242
Passing yards	174	213
Turnovers	1	1
Time of possession	23:17	36:43

== Roster ==
West Virginia's 1988 team was highlighted with an explosive offense, led by Major Harris. Harris, only a sophomore, threw an exceptional deep ball in addition to his remarkable scrambling ability. Running backs A.B. Brown, Undra Johnson, Eugene Napoleon, and Craig Taylor at fullback highlighted the run game. The runners were led by Rick Phillips and Brian Smider on the offensive line, along with Stroia and Kovach, while Kevin Koken led the line at center. Early in the season, Keith Winn was moved from receiver to tight end, providing help to the run game, but was more famous as a deep-pass threat. The receivers catching the balls from Harris were led by Reggie Rembert, who was accompanied by Calvin Phillips and Grantis Bell.

Coach Don Nehlen credited West Virginia's '88 team's defense as being the main factor to their success. The linebacking core included Renaldo Turnbull, Chris Haering, Steve Grant, Dale Jackson, Theron Ellis, and Robert Pickett. Mike Fox and Chris Parker headed the defensive line, along with Chris Haering. The secondary was one of the best in West Virginia history, led by Bo Orlando and Darrell Whitmore. Orlando had a good pro career with the Houston Oilers and Pittsburgh Steelers, while Darrell went pro in baseball. Willie Edwards played corner along with Alvoid Mays, who went pro as well, and Lawrence Drumgoole and David Lockwood played solid backup corner.

Don Nehlen was the head coach while being assisted by assistant head coach, wide receivers coach, and recruiting coordinator Doc Holliday.

1988 West Virginia Mountaineers football team roster
Players
Coaches
Offense

Pos.	#	Name	Class
WR	1	Grantis Bell	Sr
WR	2	Greg Dykes	Jr
RB	3	Eugene Napoleon	Jr
WR	3	Ron Weaver	Fr
QB	9	Major Harris	So
WR	11	Wes Jackson	So
QB	12	Chuck LeVinus	Jr
QB	14	Greg Jones	So
WR	15	Jamie LeMon	Sr
QB	16	Chris Gray	Fr
WR	16	David Miers	Jr
QB	17	James Breitbeil	Fr
QB	17	Glen McNew	Fr
WR	19	Greg P. Jones	So
FB	20	Craig Taylor	Sr
WR	21	Tom Matteucci	Jr
RB	25	Barry Browning	Fr
RB	26	Dave Clark	Fr
WR	26	Charlie Fedorco	So
RB	28	A. B. Brown	Sr
RB	29	Ralph Johnson	Fr
FB	29	Rico Tyler	So
RB	34	Undra Johnson	Sr
FB	36	Aaron Evans	So
RB	37	Jim Pastorkovich	Jr
WR	43	Kevin Burroughs	Jr
OL	50	Mike Hruska	So
OL	51	Jeff Price	Jr
OL	52	Brian Hendricks	Sr
G	55	Bob Kovach	Sr
OL	56	Lance Ference	Fr
C	57	Kevin Koken	Sr
OL	60	Doug Cooley	Fr
OL	62	Milton Redwine	Sr
OL	63	Matt Bland	So
OL	65	Scott Parker	Jr
OT	68	Rick Phillips	Sr
OL	71	Joe Ayuso	Fr
OL	72	Jack Linn	Jr
G	74	Larry Cook	So
G	75	John Stroia	Sr
OL	78	Mike Filozof	So
OT	79	Brian Smider	Sr
TE	81	Keith Winn	Sr
WR	82	Calvin Phillips	Sr
TE	83	Keith Graley	Fr
TE	85	Adrian Moss	Jr
WR	88	Jim Dodrill	Fr
WR	88	Reggie Rembert	Jr
OL	99	Verne Howard	So

Defense

Pos.	#	Name	Class
DB	3	Alvoid Mays	Sr
LB	4	Steve Grant	Fr
DB	5	Preston Waters	So
DB	6	Andrew Jones	Sr
DB	11	Darrell Whitmore	Fr
DB	14	Jay Darr	So
DB	21	Dustin Ganley	Fr
DB	22	Bo Orlando	Sr
DB	23	Darren Fulton	Jr
DB	25	Lawrence Drumgoole	Jr
DB	30	David Allaway	So
LB	35	Lee Javins	So
LB	38	Dave Sprouse	So
DB	41	Dave Lockwood	Sr
DB	42	Dan Shearer	Jr
DL	44	Roger Dixon	Jr
LB	45	Robert Pickett	Sr
DB	47	Willie Edwards	Sr
LB	49	Chris Haering	Jr
LB	53	Ted Kester	So
LB	59	Eric Lester	Sr
DL	60	John Felker	Fr
DT	61	Mike Fox	Jr
LB	66	Theron Ellis	So
DT	73	Scott Summits	Jr
DL	84	James Fuller	Jr
DE	87	Renaldo Turnbull	Jr
DL	91	James Alessi	Jr
LB	93	Dale Jackson	Sr
DT	94	Chris Parker	Sr
DE	95	Pat Marlatt	Sr
LB	97	Lonnie Brockman	Jr
NG	98	Jim Gray	Fr

Special teams

Pos.	#	Name	Class
K	8	Charlie Baumann	Sr
P	10	Greg Hertzog	So
P	18	Lance Carion	Sr
K	19	Brad Carroll	So

Head coach

- Don Nehlen

Coordinators/assistant coaches

Legend

- (C) Team captain
- (S) Suspended
- (I) Ineligible
- Injured
- Redshirt

== Honors ==
Player	Honors
Major Harris	ECAC Player of the Year; Finished fifth in the Heisman Trophy Race; All-American all-ECAC
Renaldo Turnbull	all-Big East all-ECAC
