= Chuck Lanza =

American football player (born 1964)

No. 51
- Position: Center

Personal information
- Born: September 20, 1964 (age 62); Coraopolis, Pennsylvania, U.S.
- Listed height: 6 ft 2 in (1.88 m)
- Listed weight: 263 lb (119 kg)

Career information
- High school: Christian Brothers (Memphis, Tennessee)
- College: Notre Dame (1984–1987)
- NFL draft: 1988: 3rd round, 70th overall pick

Career history
- Pittsburgh Steelers (1988–1990)

Awards and highlights
- Second-team All-American (1987)

Career NFL statistics
- Games played: 27
- Stats at Pro Football Reference

Charles Louis Lanza (born September 20, 1964) is an American former professional football player who was a center for two seasons with the Pittsburgh Steelers of the National Football League (NFL). He was selected by the Steelers in the third round of the 1988 NFL draft after playing college football for the Notre Dame Fighting Irish.

== Early life and college ==
Charles Louis Lanza was born on September 20, 1964, in Coraopolis, Pennsylvania. He attended Christian Brothers High School in Memphis, Tennessee.

Lanza played college football for the Notre Dame Fighting Irish of the University of Notre Dame from 1984 to 1987. As a senior in 1987, he was named a second-team All-American by the Associated Press and United Press International, and a first-team All-American by Football News and the Newspaper Enterprise Association.

== Professional career ==
Lanza was selected by the Pittsburgh Steelers in the third round, with the 70th overall pick, of the 1988 NFL draft. He was a holdout and did not officially sign with the team until July 28. He played in all 16 games during his rookie year in 1988. Lanza appeared in 11 games during the 1989 season. He was placed on injured reserve the next year on August 27, 1990, after tearing his tricep tendon in a preseason game. He spent the entire 1990 season on injured reserve. Lanza was released by the Steelers on August 19, 1991.

== Personal life ==
Lanza worked in the medical device sales industry after his NFL career. He also later obtained a securities license and starting working for a wealth management firm.
