= Mike Brennan (American football) =

American football player (born 1967)

No. 64
- Position: Offensive tackle

Personal information
- Born: March 22, 1967 (age 59); Camp Pendleton, California, U.S.
- Listed height: 6 ft 5 in (1.96 m)
- Listed weight: 274 lb (124 kg)

Career information
- High school: Mount Saint Joseph (Baltimore, Maryland)
- College: Notre Dame
- NFL draft: 1990: 4th round, 91st overall pick

Career history
- Cincinnati Bengals (1990–1991); Phoenix Cardinals (1991); Buffalo Bills (1991); New Orleans Saints (1993)*
- * Offseason or practice squad member only

Career NFL statistics
- Games played: 19
- Stats at Pro Football Reference

Michael Sean Brennan (born March 22, 1967) is an American former professional football player who was a tackle with the Cincinnati Bengals of the National Football League (NFL) in 1990 and 1991. He played college football for the Notre Dame Fighting Irish and was selected by the Bengals in the fourth round of the 1990 NFL draft with the 91st overall pick.

Pre-draft measurables
Height	Weight	Arm length	Hand span	40-yard dash	10-yard split	20-yard split	20-yard shuttle	Vertical jump	Broad jump	Bench press
6 ft 4 7/8 in (1.95 m)	267 lb (121 kg)	32 in (0.81 m)	10 3/4 in (0.27 m)	4.42 s	1.51 s	3.02 s	4.44 s	37.5 in (0.95 m)	8 ft 3 in (2.51 m)	30 reps
All values from NFL Combine
