= Andy Heck =

American football player and coach (born 1967)

Kansas City Chiefs
- Title: Offensive line coach

Personal information
- Born: January 1, 1967 (age 59); Fargo, North Dakota, U.S.
- Listed height: 6 ft 6 in (1.98 m)
- Listed weight: 298 lb (135 kg)

Career information
- Position: Offensive tackle (No. 66, 64)
- High school: Woodson (Fairfax, Virginia)
- College: Notre Dame
- NFL draft: 1989: 1st round, 15th overall pick

Career history

Playing
- Seattle Seahawks (1989–1993); Chicago Bears (1994–1998); Washington Redskins (1999–2000)

Coaching
- Virginia (2001–2003) Graduate assistant; Jacksonville Jaguars (2004–2012); Assistant offensive line coach (2004–2005); Offensive line coach (2006–2012); Kansas City Chiefs (2013–present) Offensive line coach

Awards and highlights
- As coach: 3× Super Bowl champion (LIV, LVII, LVIII); As player: National champion (1988); PFWA All-Rookie Team (1989); First-team All-American (1988)

Career NFL statistics
- Games played: 185
- Games started: 164
- Fumble recoveries: 5
- Stats at Pro Football Reference

Andrew Robert Heck (born January 1, 1967) is an American professional football coach and former player. He is the offensive line coach for the Kansas City Chiefs of the National Football League (NFL). He played tackle in the NFL for twelve seasons. He was selected by the Seattle Seahawks in the first round with the 15th overall selection of the 1989 NFL draft. He played college football at the University of Notre Dame. He also played for the Chicago Bears and Washington Redskins.

== Early life ==
Heck was born in Fargo, North Dakota. He attended W.T. Woodson High School in Fairfax, Virginia, a suburb southwest of Washington, D.C.. He received a scholarship to play football at the University of Notre Dame, where, as a co-captain, he helped lead the Fighting Irish to a national championship in 1988 under head coach Lou Holtz.

== Professional career ==
Pre-draft measurables
Height	Weight	40-yard dash	10-yard split	20-yard split	20-yard shuttle	Vertical jump	Broad jump	Bench press
6 ft 5 3/4 in (1.97 m)	267 lb (121 kg)	5.13 s	1.76 s	2.96 s	4.65 s	28.0 in (0.71 m)	9 ft 1 in (2.77 m)	24 reps
All values from NFL Combine

Heck was a first round selection of the Seattle Seahawks in the 1989 NFL draft, the fifteenth overall pick. He signed a five-year contract exceeding $2.7 million following a one-week holdout.

Heck signed with the Chicago Bears on February 23, 1994, for $10 million over four years. Heck played in the NFL playoffs for the first time in 1994, helping Chicago upset division-rival Minnesota before losing to the eventual Super Bowl champion San Francisco 49ers in the NFC Divisional Round. After playing five seasons with the Bears, Heck was released in June 1999.

Heck signed with the Washington Redskins in 1999, and played his final two seasons in the NFL there. In 1999, Heck helped Washington win their first NFC Eastern Division title since 1991.

== Coaching career ==
Heck moved into coaching and spent three years at the University of Virginia in Charlottesville, starting with two years as a graduate assistant. Heck was hired as the Jacksonville Jaguars assistant offensive line coach in 2004. In 2006, he was promoted to offensive line coach.

Heck was hired by the Kansas City Chiefs in 2013 as their offensive line coach. In 2019, he won his first Super Bowl when the Chiefs defeated the San Francisco 49ers 31–20 in Super Bowl LIV. In 2022, Heck won his second Super Bowl when the Chiefs defeated the Philadelphia Eagles 38–35 in Super Bowl LVII. In 2023, he won his third Super Bowl when the Chiefs defeated the 49ers 25–22 in Super Bowl LVIII.

== Personal life ==
Heck's son Charlie plays for the Tampa Bay Buccaneers.
