= George Streeter (American football) =

American football player (born 1967)

No. 30, 46
- Position: Defensive back

Personal information
- Born: August 28, 1967 (age 59); Chicago, Illinois, U.S.
- Listed height: 6 ft 2 in (1.88 m)
- Listed weight: 212 lb (96 kg)

Career information
- High school: Julian (Chicago)
- College: Notre Dame
- NFL draft: 1989: 11th round, 304th overall pick

Career history
- Chicago Bears (1989); Indianapolis Colts (1990)

Career NFL statistics
- Fumble recoveries: 1
- Stats at Pro Football Reference

George Streeter (born August 28, 1967) is an American former professional football player who was a defensive back in the National Football League (NFL). He played college football for the Notre Dame Fighting Irish. Streeter played in the NFL for the Chicago Bears in 1989 and for the Indianapolis Colts in 1990. Since 2022 he is the running backs coach of the Stuttgart Surge football team in the European League of Football (ELF).
