= Reginald Ho =

American college football player and doctor

Profile
- Position: Placekicker

Personal information
- Born: Kaneohe, Hawaii, U.S.
- Listed height: 5 ft 5 in (1.65 m)
- Listed weight: 135 lb (61 kg)

Career information
- High school: Saint Louis School (Honolulu, Hawaii)
- College: Notre Dame (1987–1988)

Awards and highlights
- National Championship (1988)

Reginald T. Ho is a cardiologist at Thomas Jefferson University Hospital in Philadelphia. Also known as Reggie Ho, he gained fame as the star kicker on the 1988 Notre Dame Fighting Irish football team.

== Early life ==
Ho grew up in Kaneohe on the Hawaiian island of Oahu. One of four children to Reginald and Sharilyn Ho, he attended St. Louis High School in Honolulu, where he played soccer and football. He was the Crusaders' placekicker. After high school, Ho enrolled in the University of Notre Dame and majored in pre-med.

== College career ==
While at Notre Dame, Ho decided to try out for the football team as a walk-on player. He made the team in 1987 and appeared in one game, kicking one PAT against the U.S. Naval Academy.

For the following season, head football coach Lou Holtz named Ho the team's starting placekicker. Standing 5 ft 5 in (1.65 m) and weighing 135 pounds (61 kg), Ho was by far the smallest member of the football team. However, in the first game of the season he endeared himself to Notre Dame fans by his performance against rival University of Michigan. Going into the game, the Fighting Irish were ranked #13 in the nation while the Wolverines were ranked #7. The game, played at Notre Dame Stadium, has since been known as the "Reggie Ho game." In that game, Ho kicked four field goals as the Irish won 19–17. The win was the beginning of an undefeated season for Notre Dame as they won the 1988 National Championship. Ho would finish the 1988 season with 32/36 PAT and 9/12 field goals.

== Professional life ==
After graduating from Notre Dame, Ho attended medical school at the University of Pennsylvania School of Medicine. He received his medical degree in 1993 and also performed his internship there.

Ho is now a cardiologist specializing in electrophysiology at the Thomas Jefferson University Hospital. He lives in Moorestown, NJ with his wife and two sons.

On January 7, 2015, his story was a part of the ESPN series, 30 for 30: Shorts, as episode 29. The film was titled "Student/Athlete" and is the story of Ho's improbable journey to the Notre Dame football team, National Championship, and medical career. It was directed and produced by Ken Jeong, who, besides being an actor and comedian himself, has a medical degree.
