= George Stewart (American football) =

American football player and coach (born 1958)

Profile
- Position: Guard

Personal information
- Born: December 29, 1958 (age 67); Little Rock, Arkansas, U.S.

Career information
- High school: Parkview (Little Rock, Arkansas)
- College: Arkansas
- NFL draft: 1981: undrafted

Career history

Playing
- Kansas City Chiefs (1981)*
- * Offseason or practice squad member only

Coaching
- Arkansas (1983) Graduate assistant; Minnesota (1984–1985) Offensive line coach; Notre Dame (1986–1988) Linebackers coach; Pittsburgh Steelers (1989–1991) Special teams coach; Tampa Bay Buccaneers (1992–1994) Tight ends/special teams coach; Tampa Bay Buccaneers (1995) Special teams coach; San Francisco 49ers (1996–1999) Special teams coach; San Francisco 49ers (2000–2002) Wide receivers coach; Atlanta Falcons (2003–2006) Wide receivers coach; Minnesota Vikings (2007–2016) Wide receivers coach; Los Angeles Chargers (2017–2020) Assistant head coach/special teams coordinator; Los Angeles Chargers (2020) Assistant head coach/offensive analyst

Awards and highlights
- National champion (1988); Second-team All-American (1979); Second-team All-SWC (1978); 1970s Razorbacks' All-Decade Team

George Stewart (born December 29, 1958) is an American football coach who is most recently the assistant head coach and offensive analyst for the Los Angeles Chargers of the National Football League (NFL). He was a coach in the NFL since 1989 after spending a few years coaching in the college ranks. He spent ten years coaching wide receivers for the Minnesota Vikings. In 2017 he became the assistant head coach and special teams coordinator for the San Diego Chargers.

== College coaching ==
Stewart began coaching in 1983 as a graduate assistant at Arkansas, working under his former head coach from his playing years at Arkansas, Lou Holtz. Stewart followed Holtz to the University of Minnesota the following year, becoming the team's offensive line coach. In 1986, Stewart would follow Holtz once again this time to Notre Dame to become the team's linebackers coach. In Stewart's final season with the Irish, they finished with a record of 12-0 and defeated West Virginia in the Fiesta Bowl to being crowned national champions.

== NFL coaching ==
Stewart began his NFL coaching career in Pittsburgh with the Steelers under Chuck Noll as a special teams coach. His tenure there would last from 1989–1991. He then went to Tampa Bay 1992-1995, where he coached tight ends in addition to the special teams, however in 1995 he would only coach the special teams. This was followed by a seven-year coaching stint in San Francisco from 1996-2002.For the first four seasons with the 49ers he would only coach the special teams however in 2000 his position was changed and George was named as the team's wide receiver's coach for his final three years with the franchise. He would continue being a wide receivers coach for four years in Atlanta from 2003-2006 and 10 seasons in Minnesota from 2007-2016. Stewart has been the Chargers' special teams coordinator and assistant head coach under Anthony Lynn since 2017. He was let go by the Chargers after the 2020 season.
