= Tony Brooks (American football) =

American football player (born 1969)

No. 39, 33
- Position: Running back

Personal information
- Born: August 17, 1969 (age 57); Tulsa, Oklahoma, U.S.
- Listed height: 6 ft 0 in (1.83 m)
- Listed weight: 230 lb (104 kg)

Career information
- High school: Washington (Tulsa)
- College: Notre Dame
- NFL draft: 1992: 4th round, 92nd overall pick

Career history
- Philadelphia Eagles (1992–1993); London Monarchs (1995)

Career NFL statistics
- Return yards: 11
- Stats at Pro Football Reference

Raymond Anthony Brooks (born August 17, 1969) is an American former professional football player who was a running back in the National Football League (NFL). He played college football for the Notre Dame Fighting Irish. He was selected by the Philadelphia Eagles in the fourth round of the 1992 NFL draft.

His son, Anthony Barr, played college football at UCLA, and was selected in the first round of the 2014 NFL draft by the Minnesota Vikings.
