= Pat Eilers =

American football player (born 1966)

No. 24, 25
- Position: Safety

Personal information
- Born: September 3, 1966 (age 60); Saint Paul, Minnesota, U.S.
- Listed height: 5 ft 11 in (1.80 m)
- Listed weight: 197 lb (89 kg)

Career information
- High school: Saint Thomas Academy (Mendota Heights, Minnesota)
- College: Yale; Notre Dame
- NFL draft: 1990: undrafted

Career history
- Minnesota Vikings (1990–1991); Phoenix Cardinals (1992)*; Washington Redskins (1992), (1993–1994); Chicago Bears (1995)
- * Offseason or practice squad member only

Career NFL statistics
- Tackles: 34
- Fumble recoveries: 7
- Stats at Pro Football Reference

Patrick Christopher Eilers (born September 3, 1966) is an American former professional football player who was a safety in the National Football League (NFL) for the Minnesota Vikings, Washington Redskins, and Chicago Bears. He played college football for the Notre Dame Fighting Irish and was a member of the 1988 team which won a national championship.

He graduated with degrees in biology and mechanical engineering in 1989 and 1990, respectively from the University of Notre Dame. Prior to attending Notre Dame, he spent his first year of university at Yale University, where he was a member of the Yale Bulldogs football team. Furthermore, after the end of his playing career in the NFL, he earned a Master of Business Administration from Northwestern University's Kellogg School of Management.

Eilers is currently the founder and managing partner of Transition Equity Partners (TEP), a private equity firm investing in energy & digital companies. Prior to founding TEP in 2020, Eilers was a managing director within BlackRock's infrastructure Investment Group, and headed the firms corporate equity and special situation investments within the conventional power industry. Prior to BlackRock, Eilers served as a managing director of Madison Dearborn Partners, LLC and oversaw its energy, power and chemicals practice. Pat worked at Madison Dearborn Partners from 1999 to 2015.
