= Rodney Culver =

American football player (1969–1996)

No. 35, 22
- Position: Running back

Personal information
- Born: December 23, 1969; Detroit, Michigan, U.S.
- Died: May 11, 1996 (aged 26); Dade County, Florida, U.S.
- Listed height: 5 ft 9 in (1.75 m)
- Listed weight: 224 lb (102 kg)

Career information
- College: Notre Dame
- NFL draft: 1992: 4th round, 85th overall pick

Career history
- Indianapolis Colts (1992–1993); San Diego Chargers (1994–1995)

Career NFL statistics
- Rushing yards: 689
- Rushing average: 2.9
- Rushing touchdowns: 13
- Stats at Pro Football Reference

Rodney Dwayne Culver (December 23, 1969 – May 11, 1996) was an American professional football player who was a running back for four seasons in the National Football League (NFL). He played college football for the Notre Dame Fighting Irish. Culver played in the NFL for the Indianapolis Colts and San Diego Chargers. Over his NFL career, he played in 43 games, rushed for 689 yards on 241 carries and ran for 12 touchdowns.

== Early life and college ==
Culver attended St. Martin de Porres High School in Detroit, Michigan and earned a scholarship to the University of Notre Dame, where he started as a tailback in 1990 and 1991. The Irish backfield had a number of talented running backs, including future pros Ricky Watters and Reggie Brooks and NFL Hall of Fame running back Jerome Bettis. Culver played as a freshman on the 1988 national championship team, including a five-yard touchdown run in the 1989 Fiesta Bowl against West Virginia. He led the Irish in rushing in 1990 with 710 yards in 11 games. The Irish were ranked number one twice that year and eventually lost to the University of Colorado in the 1991 Orange Bowl. The following year, Culver was injured but played spectacularly in Notre Dame's 39–28 defeat of the University of Florida Gators. The performance propelled him to a professional career.

For the 1991 season, Culver became the team's only captain, which had not occurred since 1986. He graduated with a degree in finance in three and a half years.

== Professional career ==
Culver was selected by the Indianapolis Colts in the fourth round of the 1992 NFL draft. He was a short yardage back his first year, carrying the ball 121 times for 321 yards and seven touchdowns. He also caught 26 passes for 210 yards and two more touchdowns. The Colts finished 9–7 but missed the AFC playoffs by one game. In 1993, the Colts were expected to contend, but a holdout by Jeff George and an injury to Steve Emtman plunged the Colts to last place. Culver ran for three touchdowns and caught one more. He was cut at the end of the season and claimed off waivers by the San Diego Chargers just before the start of the 1994 season.

Culver was the last man in a talented San Diego backfield that included newcomer Natrone Means and halfbacks Eric Bieniemy and Ronnie Harmon. Culver only carried the ball eight times all year, but he averaged more than seven yards per carry. In the 1994–95 divisional playoff against the Miami Dolphins, Culver carried six times for 14 yards as the Chargers won 22–21. Culver had no carries or catches in the 1994–95 AFC Championship Game against the Pittsburgh Steelers, a game won by the Chargers, 17–13. He made an appearance in Super Bowl XXIX against the San Francisco 49ers but failed to touch the ball. The Chargers lost 49–26.

In his final season of 1995, Culver received additional carries because of a holdout by, and later injury to, Natrone Means. He carried the ball 47 times for 155 yards and three touchdowns and caught five passes for 21 yards. The Chargers again reached the playoffs but lost to the Colts, 35–20.

Culver scored the tying touchdown, the last of his career, in the infamous 1995 Chargers-Giants "Snowball Game" at Giants Stadium.

== Death ==
Culver and his wife Karen were killed in the crash of ValuJet Flight 592 on May 11, 1996. At the time of the Culvers' deaths, the couple had two young daughters. A settlement was reached with ValuJet that paid Culver's family $28 million.

== See also ==
- List of gridiron football players who died during their careers
