= Mark Green (American football) =

American football player (born 1967)

No. 31
- Position: Running back

Personal information
- Born: March 22, 1967 (age 59); Riverside, California, U.S.
- Listed height: 6 ft 1 in (1.85 m)
- Listed weight: 185 lb (84 kg)

Career information
- High school: Riverside Poly
- College: Notre Dame
- NFL draft: 1989: 5th round, 130th overall pick

Career history
- Chicago Bears (1989–1992)

Career NFL statistics
- Rushing yards: 496
- Rushing average: 4.3
- Receptions: 22
- Receiving yards: 213
- Touchdowns: 7
- Stats at Pro Football Reference

Mark Anthony Green (born March 22, 1967) is an American former professional football player who was a running back in the National Football League (NFL). After playing college football for the Notre Dame Fighting Irish, he was selected by the Chicago Bears in the fifth round of the 1989 NFL draft.
