= Scott Kowalkowski =

American football player (born 1968)

No. 57, 52
- Position: Linebacker

Personal information
- Born: August 23, 1968 (age 58); Royal Oak, Michigan, U.S.
- Listed height: 6 ft 2 in (1.88 m)
- Listed weight: 220 lb (100 kg)

Career information
- High school: St. Mary's Preparatory (Orchard Lake Village, Michigan)
- College: Notre Dame
- NFL draft: 1991: 8th round, 216th overall pick

Career history
- Philadelphia Eagles (1991–1993); Detroit Lions (1994–2001)

Career NFL statistics
- Tackles: 110
- Sacks: 1
- Forced fumbles: 2
- Interceptions: 1
- Stats at Pro Football Reference

Scott Thomas Kowalkowski (born August 23, 1968) is an American former professional football player who was a linebacker for the Philadelphia Eagles and the Detroit Lions in a 10-year career that lasted from 1991 to 2001 in the National Football League (NFL).

Kowalkowski played college football for the Notre Dame Fighting Irish and was selected in the eighth round of the 1991 NFL draft by the Eagles. His father, Bob Kowalkowski, also played with the Lions.

== Personal life ==
Kowalkowski played high school football at Saint Mary's Preparatory in Orchard Lake, Michigan, where he was an All-American defensive lineman. He graduated from Saint Mary's in 1987.

Kowalkowski and his family currently reside in Lake Orion, Michigan.
