= Andre Jones (linebacker) =

American football player (1969–2011)

No. 90, 51
- Position: Linebacker

Personal information
- Born: May 15, 1969; Washington, D.C., U.S.
- Died: June 22, 2011 (aged 42); Roswell, Georgia, U.S.
- Listed height: 6 ft 4.5 in (1.94 m)
- Listed weight: 245 lb (111 kg)

Career information
- High school: DeMatha Catholic (Hyattsville, Maryland)
- College: Notre Dame
- NFL draft: 1991: 7th round, 185th overall pick

Career history
- Pittsburgh Steelers (1991)*; Winnipeg Blue Bombers (1991); Detroit Lions (1992)
- * Offseason or practice squad member only
- Stats at Pro Football Reference

Andre Fitzgerald Jones (May 15, 1969 – June 22, 2011) was an American professional football player who was a linebacker for one season with the Detroit Lions of the National Football League (NFL) in 1992. He played college football for the Notre Dame Fighting Irish, and was selected by the Pittsburgh Steelers in the seventh round of the 1991 NFL draft. He died in 2011 due to a brain aneurysm.

== Personal life ==
He had five children, including three sons: T. J., Malachi, and Jahmai. T. J. is a wide receiver, Malachi is a wide receiver for the Montreal Alouettes of the Canadian Football League (CFL), and Jahmai is an outfielder for the Boston Red Sox.
