= 1989 Fiesta Bowl =

1989 Sunkist Fiesta Bowl
- 18th Fiesta Bowl; National championship game (Note: Through luck and fortuitous scheduling, a "national championship game" was occasionally able to settle the matter on the field, as described in some contemporaneous reports. Despite the promotional billing, in several instances there were plausible scenarios for a third team to be selected as national champion by the major selectors, depending on outcomes of other games.) (Note: Winner would be the season's only undefeated team; one-loss No. 2 Miami held out slim hope to be voted No. 1 in the case of a West Virginia win.)
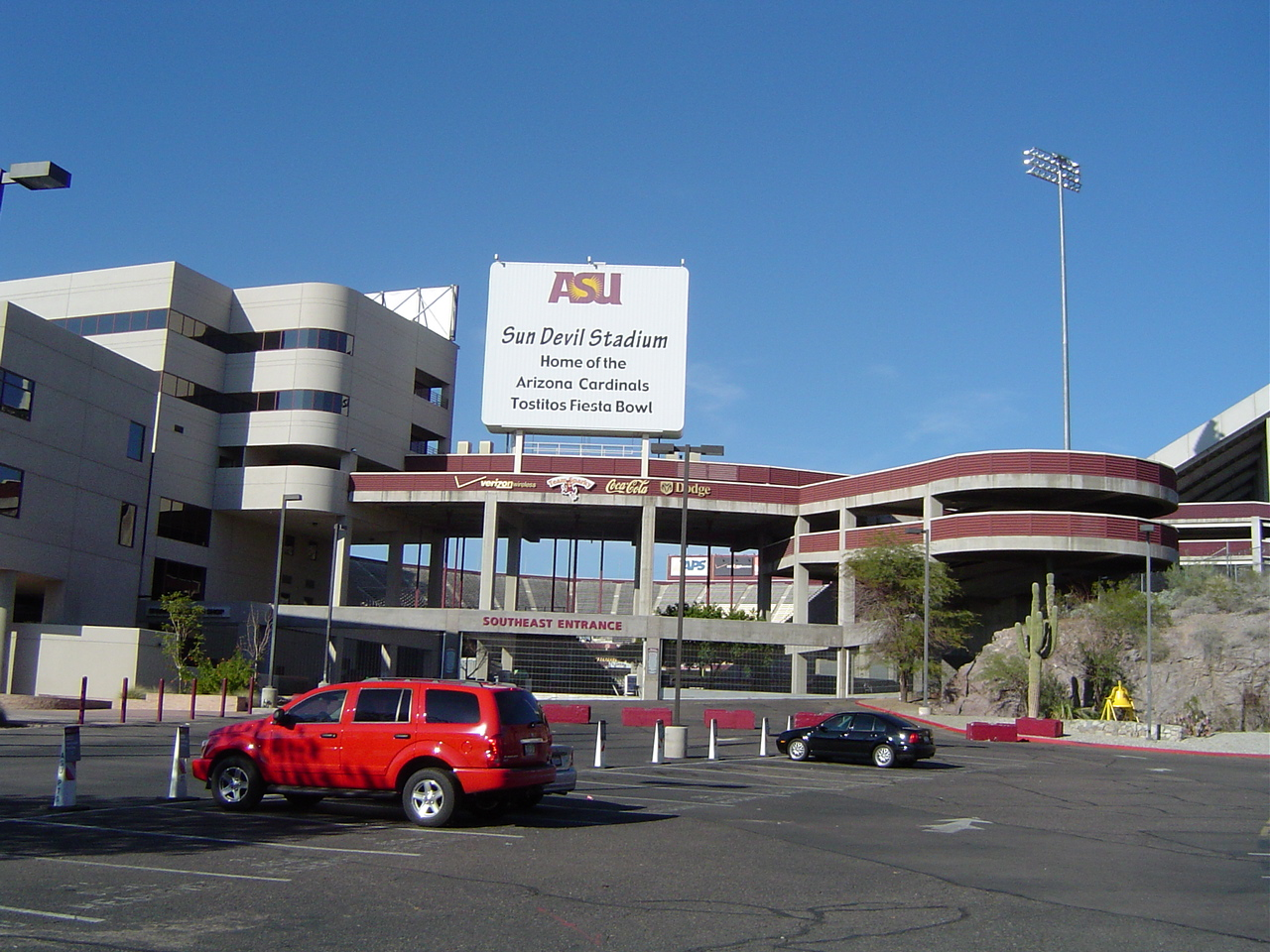
- Sun Devil Stadium in Tempe, Arizona, hosted the Fiesta Bowl.
West Virginia Mountaineers	Notre Dame Fighting Irish
(11–0)	(11–0)
Independent	Independent
21	34
Head coach: Don Nehlen	Head coach: Lou Holtz
AP / Coaches; 3 / 3	AP / Coaches; 1 / 1
	1	2	3	4	Total
West Virginia	0	6	7	8	21
Notre Dame	9	14	3	8	34
- Date: January 2, 1989
- Season: 1988
- Stadium: Sun Devil Stadium
- Location: Tempe, Arizona
- MVP: Tony Rice (QB, Notre Dame); Frank Stams (LB, Notre Dame)
- Favorite: Notre Dame by 5 points
- Referee: Frank Shepard (SWC)
- Attendance: 74,911

United States TV coverage
- Network: NBC
- Announcers: Dick Enberg and Merlin Olsen
- Nielsen ratings: 17.0

The 1989 Sunkist Fiesta Bowl, played on Monday, January 2, was the 18th edition of the Fiesta Bowl. It featured the top-ranked Notre Dame Fighting Irish and the third-ranked West Virginia Mountaineers. With both teams undefeated, the Fiesta Bowl was the stage for the "national championship" for the second time in three years. However, it was not a matchup that featured the top two teams in the rankings as the team that was second at the time, the defending national champion Miami Hurricanes, was selected to play in the Orange Bowl against the Nebraska Cornhuskers; this opened up the possibility for a split national championship were West Virginia to win the game.

As in 1987, the Fiesta Bowl featured two independents squaring off for the national title. It was also played on January 2, as in 1987; unlike that game, which was purposely moved to January 2 to take advantage of a large national television audience, this edition of the Fiesta Bowl was played on January 2 as New Year's Day fell on a Sunday in 1989 and practices dictated that all of the major bowl games taking place on that day under normal circumstances would be pushed back one day so as not to compete with other organizations such as the National Football League, which conducted its Divisional Playoff round that particular weekend.

The Fiesta Bowl was televised by NBC as part of its contract with the bowl organizers. Traditionally, the game had been the first of the day to begin, preceding the network's telecast of the Rose Bowl Game. However, since NBC was no longer carrying the Rose Bowl after being outbid by ABC, it simply moved the start time of the game to 2:30 p.m. MST, which put it directly against the Rose Bowl telecast on ABC. Dick Enberg and Merlin Olsen, NBC's lead broadcast team for NFL football at the time and who had called the Rose Bowl for the previous several years, were on the call for this edition of the Fiesta Bowl.

Notre Dame emerged victorious, winning their first consensus national championship since 1977. As of 2026, this is the most recent national championship won by the Fighting Irish. This was the last national championship game before the start of the Bowl Coalition system in 1992, which was intended to ensure that the national championship would be decided on the field in bowl games such as this one. It would later be replaced by the Bowl Alliance and Bowl Championship Series, both of which took greater steps to prevent a split national championship from ever happening again; despite these steps, there were four more instances of split championships before the start of the College Football Playoff, which was designed to guarantee a consensus champion.

== Game summary ==
After West Virginia quarterback and Heisman candidate Major Harris separated his shoulder on the third play of the game, Notre Dame took control to claim their record eleventh national championship. Though Harris would return to the game he was severely hampered by his injury. Coach Nehlen later admitting that WVU had to abandon a large portion of its gameplan due to the injury of Harris. WVU also suffered the loss of three other starters during the 1st half which did not help matters. They were NG Jim Gray, OG John Stroia, and productive reserve running back Undra Johnson also left the game early with a knee injury on his first carry. Johnson had rushed for over 700yds and 11 TDs during the 1988 season. WVU had already went into the game without its starting FS Darrell Whitmore who was injured in the final game of the season.

Billy Hackett started the scoring with a 45-yard field goal to give Notre Dame an early 3–0 lead. Running back Anthony Johnson then scored on a 1-yard touchdown run, but the ensuing extra point missed, and the score remained 9–0. Early in the second quarter, Rodney Culver added a 5-yard touchdown run to increase Notre Dame's lead to 16–0. Charlie Baumann of West Virginia scored on a 29-yard field goal to cut the lead to 16–3.

Later in the second quarter, Tony Rice threw a 29-yard touchdown pass to Raghib Ismail, to extend the lead to 23–3. Mountaineer Charlie Baumann added a 31-yard field goal before halftime to make it 23–6.

Early in the third quarter, Reggie Ho added a 32-yard field goal to increase the Irish lead to 26–6. WVU quarterback Harris hit Grantis Bell for a 17-yard touchdown pass, cutting the lead to 26–13. He later left the game with an injury. Rice threw a 3-yard touchdown pass to Frank Jacobs. Rice later took it in himself for the 2-point conversion, giving Notre Dame a 34–13 lead. WVU scored with a 3-yard touchdown run by Reggie Rembert, who also converted the 2-point conversion, making the score 34–21. Notre Dame sealed the win by intercepting a pass in the end zone.

Notre Dame retained its top ranking in the final AP poll and West Virginia fell to fifth. As of 2025, this remains the most recent national championship for the Irish.

=== Scoring summary ===
Scoring summary	Score
1st Quarter
ND – Billy Hackett 45-yard field goal	ND 3–0
ND – Anthony Johnson 1 Yard rush (pat failed)	ND 9–0
2nd Quarter
ND – Rodney Culver 5-yard rush (Reggie Ho kick)	ND 16–0
WV – Charlie Baumann 29-yard field goal	ND 16–3
ND – Tony Rice 29-yard pass to Raghib Ismail (Reggie Ho kick)	ND 23–3
WV – Charlie Baumann 32-yard field goal	ND 23–6
3rd Quarter
ND – Reggie Ho 32-yard field goal	ND 26–6
WV – Major Harris 17-yard pass to Grantis Bell (Charlie Baumann kick)	ND 26–13
4th Quarter
ND – Tony Rice 3-yard pass to Frank Jacobs (Tony Rice run)	ND 34–13
WV – Reggie Rembert 3-yard rush (Greg Jones pass to Reggie Rembert)	ND 34–21

== Statistics ==
Statistics	West Virginia	Notre Dame
First downs	19	19
Rushes–yards	37–108	59–242
Passing yards	174	213
Passes	14–30–1	7–11–1
Total yards	282	455
Punts–average	7–45	4–37
Fumbles–lost	0–0	2–0
Turnovers by	1	1
Penalties-yards	3–38	11–102
Time of possession	23:17	36:43
