= Frank Stams =

American football player (born 1965)

No. 50, 55
- Position: Linebacker

Personal information
- Born: July 17, 1965 (age 61); Akron, Ohio, U.S.
- Listed height: 6 ft 2 in (1.88 m)
- Listed weight: 240 lb (109 kg)

Career information
- High school: St. Vincent–St. Mary (Akron)
- College: Notre Dame
- NFL draft: 1989: 2nd round, 45th overall pick

Career history
- Los Angeles Rams (1989–1991); Cleveland Browns (1992–1994); Carolina Panthers (1995)*; Kansas City Chiefs (1995); Cleveland Browns (1995)
- * Offseason or practice squad member only

Awards and highlights
- National champion (1988); Consensus All-American (1988)

Career NFL statistics
- Tackles: 191
- Sacks: 2
- Interceptions: 2
- Stats at Pro Football Reference

Francis Michael Stams (born July 17, 1965) is an American former professional football player who was a linebacker in the National Football League (NFL). He played college football as a defensive lineman for the Notre Dame Fighting Irish. He played on the 1988 National Championship team. He would later play in the NFL, where he was converted to linebacker. He was selected by the Los Angeles Rams in the second round of the 1989 NFL draft with the 45th overall pick. "Football/basketball/baseball standout Frank Stams helped St. Vincent-St. Mary win back-to-back Division III state football championships in 1981 and '82, a Class AA state basketball title in 1984 and was also an All-American on Notre Dame's 1988 NCAA national championship football team. Notre Dame's storied program has not won a national title since Stams' senior year.

Stams earned a bachelor's degree in history at Notre Dame, then played three seasons with the Los Angeles Rams and four seasons with the Browns.

Stams currently resides in Cuyahoga Falls with his wife, Mari, son Mason, and daughter Rhiannon. Both of his children went to St. Vincent–St. Mary High School like Frank. His daughter now attends Miami University in Oxford, Ohio. He now works as vice president at Evans Insurance Agency in Akron, participates as a high school/Mid-American Conference football analyst for SportsTime Ohio, and is a volunteer for the Cleveland Browns Alumni Department. The former linebacker, who is 6-3 and weighed 240 pounds during his playing days, can be found on the golf course in his spare time, coaching youth football, basketball and baseball or fishing with his children." In 2019, Stams was elected to serve on the Cuyahoga Falls City Council.
