= 2026 Notre Dame Fighting Irish football team =

American college football season

2026 Notre Dame Fighting Irish football
- Conference: Independent

Ranking
- Coaches: No. 3
- AP: No. 3
- CFP: No. 6
- Record: 10–1
- Head coach: Marcus Freeman (5th season)
- Offensive coordinator: Mike Denbrock (3rd in current stint, 4th overall season)
- Offensive scheme: Multiple
- Defensive coordinator: Chris Ash (2nd season)
- Co-defensive coordinator: Aaron Henry (1st season)
- Base defense: 4–2–5
- Captains: Drayk Bowen; CJ Carr; Jordan Faison; Adon Shuler
- Home stadium: Notre Dame Stadium

Uniform
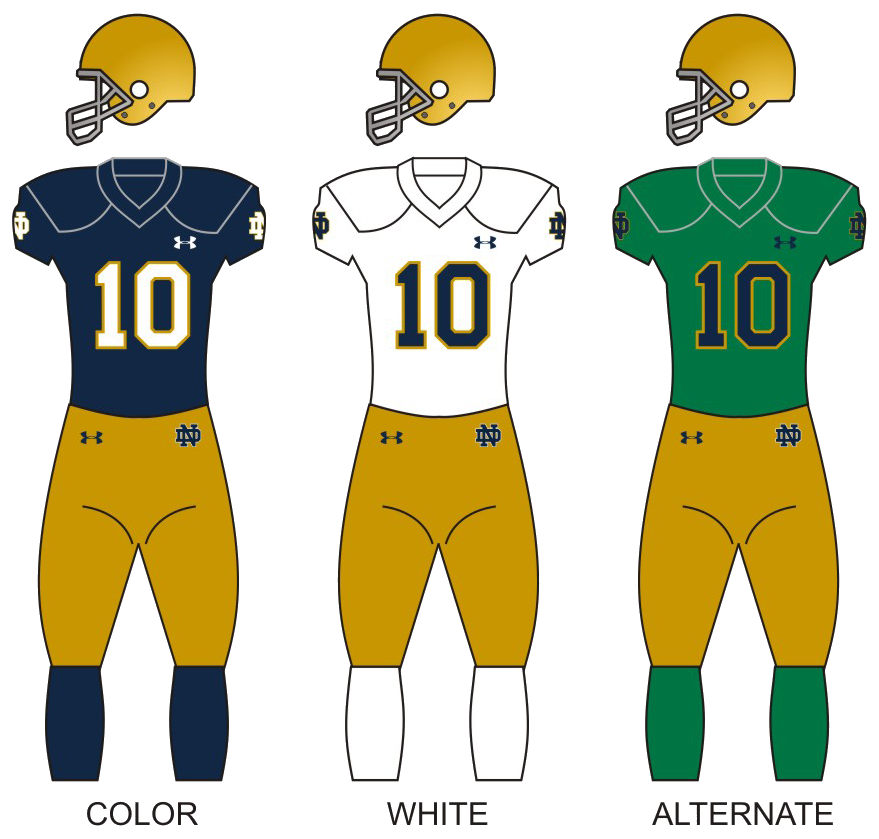

2026 NCAA Division I FBS independents football records
	Conf.			Overall
Team	W		L	W		L
No. 6 Notre Dame		–		10	–	1
UConn		–		6	–	5
As of November 22, 2026; Rankings from CFP rankings

The 2026 Notre Dame Fighting Irish football team represents the University of Notre Dame as an independent during the 2026 NCAA Division I FBS football season. The Fighting Irish are led by fifth-year head coach Marcus Freeman. They play their home games at Notre Dame Stadium located in Notre Dame, Indiana.

== Offseason ==
=== Coaching changes ===
==== Departures ====
Name	Position	New team	New position
Max Bullough	Linebackers coach	Michigan State	Co-defensive coordinator/linebackers coach
Mike Mickens	Defensive backs coach/defensive pass game coordinator	Baltimore Ravens	Defensive pass game coordinator/secondary coach
Al Washington	Defensive line coach/defensive run game coordinator	Miami Dolphins	Linebackers coach

==== Additions ====
Name	Position	Previous team	Previous position
Jevaughn Codlin	Safeties coach	Notre Dame	Analyst/assistant defensive line coach
Aaron Henry	Co-defensive coordinator/defensive backs coach	Illinois	Defensive coordinator
Brian Jean-Mary	Linebackers coach/run game coordinator	Michigan	Linebackers coach/defensive run game coordinator
Charlie Partridge	Defensive line coach	Indianapolis Colts	Defensive line coach

=== Player departures ===
==== NFL ====
Player	Position	Team	Round	Pick	Notes
Jeremiyah Love	RB	Arizona Cardinals	1	3	Forewent 2 years of remaining eligibility
Jadarian Price	RB	Seattle Seahawks	1	32	Forewent 1 year of remaining eligibility
Malachi Fields	WR	New York Giants	3	74	
Eli Raridon	TE	New England Patriots	3	95	Forewent 1 year of remaining eligibility
Billy Schrauth	OL	Tampa Bay Buccaneers	5	160	Forewent 1 year of remaining eligibility
Gabriel Rubio	DL	Pittsburgh Steelers	6	210	
Jordan Botelho	DL	Minnesota Vikings	Undrafted free agent		
Will Pauling	WR	San Francisco 49ers	Undrafted free agent		
DeVonta Smith	CB	Carolina Panthers	Undrafted free agent		
Jalen Stroman	S	San Francisco 49ers	Undrafted free agent		
Aamil Wagner	OL	Tennessee Titans	Undrafted free agent		Forewent 1 year of remaining eligibility
James Rendell	P	Tampa Bay Buccaneers	Rookie minicamp invite		
Jake Tafelski	RB	Tennessee Titans, Minnesota Vikings	Rookie minicamp invite		

==== UFL ====
Player	Position	Team	Round	Pick	Notes
Aamil Wagner	OL	DC Defenders	1	7	Forewent 1 year of remaining eligibility

==== Transfers out ====
Name	Number	Position	Year	New school	Notes
Taebron Bennie-Powell	31	S	RFr	Boise State	
JaDon Blair	11	S	Fr	Missouri	
Joshua Burnham	40	DL	RJr	Indiana	
Marcello Diomede	48	K	Jr	Ohio State	Previously walk-on
Karson Hobbs	21	CB	So	Florida State	
Bodie Kahoun	36	LB	RFr	Boston College	
Kenny Minchey	8	QB	RSo	Kentucky	Previously committed to Nebraska
Ben Minich	13	S	RSo	Miami (OH)	
Armel Mukam	88	DL	RSo	Withdrawn	
Gi'Bran Payne	3	RB	RJr	Cincinnati	
Anthony Rezac	16	QB	So	South Dakota State	Previously walk-on
Scrap Richardson	81	WR	Fr	Auburn	
Anthony Sacca	39	LB	Fr	UCLA	
Leo Scheidler	82	WR	Sr	Miami (OH)	Previously walk-on
KK Smith	11	WR	RSo	Michigan State	
Cree Thomas	20	CB	Fr	Colorado	
Chance Tucker	18	CB	RSr	North Dakota State	
Junior Tuihalamaka	44	DL	Sr	LSU	
Alex Whitman	86	WR	Jr	San Diego	Previously walk-on
Preston Zinter	25	DL	RSo	Rice	

==== Retirements ====
Name	Number	Position	Year	Notes
Mickey Brown	48	CB	Sr	Walk-on
Tyler Buchner	10	QB	RSr	Walk-on
Noah Burnette	98	K	RSr	
Jared Dawson	93	DL	RSr	
Dylan Devezin	25	RB	Sr	Walk-on
Charles Du	49	CB	Sr	Walk-on
Isaiah Dunn	32	CB	Sr	Walk-on
Justin Fisher	32	TE	Sr	Walk-on
Donovan Hinish	41	DL	RJr	
Kobi Onyiuke	90	DL	Sr	Walk-on
Jerry Rullo	46	LB	Sr	Walk-on
Brenan Vernon	17	DL	RSo	

=== Player additions ===
==== Transfers in ====
Name	Number	Position	Year	Previous school
Francis Brewu	7	DL	Jr	Pittsburgh
Mylan Graham	3	WR	Jr	Ohio State
Tionne Gray	0	DL	Jr	Oregon
Keon Keeley	11	DL	Sr	Alabama
DJ McKinney	2	CB	5th	Colorado
Spencer Porath	35	K	Jr	Purdue
Quincy Porter	0	WR	So	Ohio State
Jayden Sanders	12	CB	So	Michigan

==== Recruiting ====
College recruiting (2026)
Name	Hometown	School	Height	Weight	Commit date
Khary Adams; CB	Baltimore, MD	Loyola Blakefield	6 ft 1 in (1.85 m)	185 lb (84 kg)	
Khary Adams; CB	Recruit ratings: Rivals: 247Sports: ESPN: (87)				
Ja'Kobe Clapper; LB	Cincinnati, OH	St. Xavier	6 ft 2 in (1.88 m)	220 lb (100 kg)	
Ja'Kobe Clapper; LB	Recruit ratings: Rivals: 247Sports: ESPN: (78)				
Thomas Davis Jr. LB	Weddington, NC	Weddington	6 ft 2 in (1.88 m)	218 lb (99 kg)	
Thomas Davis Jr. LB	Recruit ratings: Rivals: 247Sports: ESPN: (82)				
Micah Drescher; K	Hinsdale, IL	Hinsdale Central	6 ft 3 in (1.91 m)	198 lb (90 kg)	
Micah Drescher; K	Recruit ratings: Rivals: 247Sports: ESPN: (75)				
Rodney Dunham; DL	Charlotte, NC	Myers Park	6 ft 4 in (1.93 m)	225 lb (102 kg)	
Rodney Dunham; DL	Recruit ratings: Rivals: 247Sports: ESPN: (86)				
Ebenezer Ewetade; DL	Raleigh, NC	South Garner	6 ft 4 in (1.93 m)	211 lb (96 kg)	
Ebenezer Ewetade; DL	Recruit ratings: Rivals: 247Sports: ESPN: (81)				
Dylan Faison; WR	Weston, FL	Saint Andrew's	6 ft 1 in (1.85 m)	180 lb (82 kg)	
Dylan Faison; WR	Recruit ratings: Rivals: 247Sports: ESPN: (76)				
Kaydon Finley; WR	Aledo, TX	Aledo	6 ft 0 in (1.83 m)	212 lb (96 kg)	
Kaydon Finley; WR	Recruit ratings: Rivals: 247Sports: ESPN: (82)				
Devin Fitzgerald; WR	Paradise Valley, AZ	Brophy Prep	6 ft 2 in (1.88 m)	205 lb (93 kg)	
Devin Fitzgerald; WR	Recruit ratings: Rivals: 247Sports: ESPN: (79)				
Bubba Frazier; WR	Savannah, GA	Benedictine Military	5 ft 8 in (1.73 m)	177 lb (80 kg)	
Bubba Frazier; WR	Recruit ratings: Rivals: 247Sports: ESPN: (81)				
Preston Fryzel; TE	Holland, OH	Central Catholic	6 ft 4 in (1.93 m)	220 lb (100 kg)	
Preston Fryzel; TE	Recruit ratings: Rivals: 247Sports: ESPN: (78)				
Sullivan Garvin; OL	Allegan, MI	Allegan	6 ft 5 in (1.96 m)	314 lb (142 kg)	
Sullivan Garvin; OL	Recruit ratings: Rivals: 247Sports: ESPN: (78)				
Elijah Golden; DL	Fredericksburg, VA	Cardinal Mooney	6 ft 4 in (1.93 m)	270 lb (120 kg)	
Elijah Golden; DL	Recruit ratings: Rivals: 247Sports: ESPN: (83)				
Noah Grubbs; QB	Lake Mary, FL	Lake Mary	6 ft 4 in (1.93 m)	208 lb (94 kg)	
Noah Grubbs; QB	Recruit ratings: Rivals: 247Sports: ESPN: (81)				
Tiki Hola; DL	Bastrop, TX	Bastrop	6 ft 3 in (1.91 m)	305 lb (138 kg)	
Tiki Hola; DL	Recruit ratings: Rivals: 247Sports: ESPN: (82)				
Teddy Jarrard; QB	Kennesaw, GA	North Cobb	6 ft 3 in (1.91 m)	190 lb (86 kg)	
Teddy Jarrard; QB	Recruit ratings: Rivals: 247Sports: ESPN: (82)				
Grayson McKeogh; OL	Perkasie, PA	La Salle	6 ft 8 in (2.03 m)	300 lb (140 kg)	
Grayson McKeogh; OL	Recruit ratings: Rivals: 247Sports: ESPN: (79)				
Tyler Merrill; OL	Mechanicsburg, PA	Cumberland Valley	6 ft 5 in (1.96 m)	330 lb (150 kg)	
Tyler Merrill; OL	Recruit ratings: Rivals: 247Sports: ESPN: (84)				
Ben Nichols; OL	Davison, MI	Davison	6 ft 5 in (1.96 m)	320 lb (150 kg)	
Ben Nichols; OL	Recruit ratings: Rivals: 247Sports: ESPN: (81)				
Joey O'Brien; S	Philadelphia, PA	La Salle	6 ft 4 in (1.93 m)	190 lb (86 kg)	
Joey O'Brien; S	Recruit ratings: Rivals: 247Sports: ESPN: (84)				
Javian Osborne; RB	Forney, TX	Forney	5 ft 10 in (1.78 m)	200 lb (91 kg)	
Javian Osborne; RB	Recruit ratings: Rivals: 247Sports: ESPN: (83)				
Gregory Patrick; OL	Portage, MI	Portage Northern	6 ft 5 in (1.96 m)	275 lb (125 kg)	
Gregory Patrick; OL	Recruit ratings: Rivals: 247Sports: ESPN: (81)				
Ayden Pouncey; CB	Orlando, FL	Winter Park	6 ft 3 in (1.91 m)	179 lb (81 kg)	
Ayden Pouncey; CB	Recruit ratings: Rivals: 247Sports: ESPN: (82)				
Ian Premer; TE	Great Bend, KS	Great Bend	6 ft 6 in (1.98 m)	235 lb (107 kg)	
Ian Premer; TE	Recruit ratings: Rivals: 247Sports: ESPN: (84)				
Nick Reddish; CB	Charlotte, NC	Independence	5 ft 10 in (1.78 m)	185 lb (84 kg)	
Nick Reddish; CB	Recruit ratings: Rivals: 247Sports: ESPN: (77)				
Brayden Robinson; WR	Red Oak, TX	Red Oak	5 ft 8 in (1.73 m)	164 lb (74 kg)	
Brayden Robinson; WR	Recruit ratings: Rivals: 247Sports: ESPN: (80)				
Jasper Scaife; P	West Perth, Western Australia, Australia	Warwick Senior	6 ft 6 in (1.98 m)	215 lb (98 kg)	
Jasper Scaife; P	Recruit ratings: Rivals: 247Sports: ESPN: (73)				
Chaz Smith; CB	Knoxville, TN	Knoxville Catholic	6 ft 0 in (1.83 m)	169 lb (77 kg)	
Chaz Smith; CB	Recruit ratings: Rivals: 247Sports: ESPN: (78)				
Charlie Thom; OL	Darien, CT	Avon Old Farms	6 ft 7 in (2.01 m)	275 lb (125 kg)	
Charlie Thom; OL	Recruit ratings: Rivals: 247Sports: ESPN: (76)				
Jonaz Walton; RB	Carrollton, GA	Central	5 ft 9 in (1.75 m)	208 lb (94 kg)	
Jonaz Walton; RB	Recruit ratings: Rivals: 247Sports: ESPN: (82)				
Overall recruit ranking: Rivals: 2 247Sports: 4 ESPN: 4
Note: In many cases, Scout, Rivals, 247Sports, On3, and ESPN may conflict in their listings of height and weight.; In these cases, the average was taken. ESPN grades are on a 100-point scale.; Sources: "Rivals commits". Rivals.; "ESPN commits". ESPN.; "2026 Team Ranking". Rivals.com.; "247Sports commits". 247Sports.

==== New walk-ons ====
Name	Number	Position	Year
Michael Giovacco	30	CB	Sr
Austin Ratigan	89	TE	Fr
Kurt Smith	37	RB	So
Matt Williams	46	RB	Sr
Chase Young	48	S	So

=== Other ===
- S Brauntae Johnson changed name from Tae Johnson.
- Erik Schmidt changed position from K to P.

== Schedule ==
Date	Time	Opponent	Rank	Site	TV	Result	Attendance
September 6	7:30 p.m.	vs. Wisconsin	No. 4	Lambeau Field; Green Bay, WI (Shamrock Series)	NBC	W 41–13	75,939
September 12	3:30 p.m.	Rice	No. 3	Notre Dame Stadium; Notre Dame, IN	NBC	W 52–0	77,622
September 19	7:30 p.m.	Michigan State	No. 3	Notre Dame Stadium; Notre Dame, IN (Megaphone Trophy)	NBC	W 27–10	77,622
September 26	2:00 p.m.	at Purdue	No. 3	Ross–Ade Stadium; West Lafayette, IN (Shillelagh Trophy)	Peacock/NBCSN	W 49–10	52,273
October 3	12:00 p.m.	at North Carolina	No. 3	Kenan Stadium; Chapel Hill, NC (rivalry)	ESPN	W 37–26	50,500
October 10	3:30 p.m.	Stanford	No. 3	Notre Dame Stadium; Notre Dame, IN (Legends Trophy)	NBC	W 58–7	77,622
October 17	7:30 p.m.	at No. 8 BYU	No. 2	LaVell Edwards Stadium; Provo, UT (College GameDay)	ABC	L 24–28	65,179
October 31	12:00 p.m.	vs. Navy	No. 5	Gillette Stadium; Foxborough, MA (Rip Miller Trophy)	ABC	W 35–13	61,293
November 7	7:30 p.m.	No. 1 Miami (FL)	No. 11	Notre Dame Stadium; Notre Dame, IN (rivalry / College GameDay)	NBC	W 31–24	77,622
November 14	3:30 p.m.	Boston College	No. 5	Notre Dame Stadium; Notre Dame, IN (Holy War)	NBC	W 41–7	77,622
November 21	7:30 p.m.	SMU	No. 6	Notre Dame Stadium; Notre Dame, IN	NBC	W 24–3	77,622
November 28	12:00 p.m.	at Syracuse		JMA Wireless Dome; Syracuse, NY	ABC		
Rankings from AP Poll (and CFP Rankings after November 3) – Released prior to game; All times are in Eastern time; Source:

== Game summaries ==
=== vs. Wisconsin ===
Wisconsin Badgers (0–0) vs No. 4 Notre Dame Fighting Irish (0–0) – Game summary

Quarter	1	2	3	4	Total
Badgers	3	7	3	0	13
No. 4 Fighting Irish	10	3	14	14	41

at Lambeau Field • Green Bay, Wisconsin

- Date: September 6
- Game time: 6:30 p.m. CDT
- Game weather: Clear, 72 °F (22 °C); Wind: E 6 miles per hour (9.7 km/h)
- Game attendance: 75,939
- Referee: Justin Elliott
- TV announcers (NBC/Peacock): Dan Hicks, Jason Garrett, and Caroline Pineda
- Box score, Recap

Game information

First quarter

- (10:53) WIS – Gavin Lahm 27-yard field goal (Drive: 9 plays, 28 yards, 4:25; Wisconsin 3–0)
- (1:31) ND – Spencer Porath 52-yard field goal (Drive: 11 plays, 48 yards, 4:56; Tied 3–3)
- (0:22) ND – James Flanigan 3-yard pass from CJ Carr, Spencer Porath kick (Drive: 4 plays, 13 yards, 1:06; Notre Dame 10–3)

Second quarter

- (12:36) WIS – Malachi Coleman 28-yard pass from Colton Joseph, Gavin Lahm kick (Drive: 2 plays, 48 yards, 0:33; Tied 10–10)
- (8:35) ND – Spencer Porath 26-yard field goal (Drive: 8 plays, 67 yards, 3:43; Notre Dame 13–10)

Third quarter

- (10:23) ND – Aneyas Williams 3-yard run, Spencer Porath kick (Drive: 9 plays, 70 yards, 4:31; Notre Dame 20–10)
- (8:59) ND – DJ McKinney 55-yard Interception return, Spencer Porath kick (Drive: 4 plays, 20 yards, 1:31; Notre Dame 27–10)
- (0:41) WIS – Gavin Lahm 36-yard field goal (Drive: 14 plays, 47 yards, 8:38; Notre Dame 27–13)

Fourth quarter

- (10:48) ND – Aneyas Williams 5-yard run, Spencer Porath kick (Drive: 8 plays, 75 yards, 4:26; Notre Dame 34–13)
- (1:51) ND – Nolan James Jr. 28-yard pass from CJ Carr, Spencer Porath kick (Drive: 12 plays, 88 yards, 6:06; Notre Dame 41–13)

Statistics	WISC	ND
First downs	16	20
Plays–yards	61–284	61–350
Rushes–yards	31–67	32–111
Passing yards	217	239
Passing: comp–att–int	19–30–1	19–29–0
Turnovers	2	0
Time of possession	28:24	31:36

Team	Category	Player	Statistics
Wisconsin	Passing	Colton Joseph	19/30, 217 yards, TD, INT
Wisconsin	Rushing	Abu Sama	15 carries, 49 yards
Wisconsin	Receiving	Malachi Coleman	4 receptions, 76 yards, TD
Notre Dame	Passing	CJ Carr	19/29, 239 yards, 2 TD
Notre Dame	Rushing	Aneyas Williams	20 carries, 90 yards, 2 TD
Notre Dame	Receiving	Jordan Faison	4 receptions, 81 yards

=== Rice ===
Rice Owls (1–0) at No. 3 Notre Dame Fighting Irish (1–0) – Game summary

Quarter	1	2	3	4	Total
Owls	0	0	0	0	0
No. 3 Fighting Irish	21	21	10	0	52

at Notre Dame Stadium • Notre Dame, Indiana

- Date: September 12
- Game time: 2:30 p.m. CDT/3:30 p.m. EDT
- Game weather: Clear, 82 °F (28 °C); Wind SW 8 miles per hour (13 km/h)
- Game attendance: 77,622
- Referee: Nate Black
- TV announcers (NBC): Dan Hicks, Jason Garrett, and Caroline Pineda
- Box score, Recap

Game information

First quarter

- (14:46) ND – Boubacar Traore 24-yard fumble return (Drive: 2 plays, -1 yards, 0:14; Notre Dame 7–0)
- (10:30) ND – Jordan Faison 25-yard pass from CJ Carr (Drive: 3 plays, 38 yards, 1:06; Notre Dame 14–0)
- (3:51) ND – Jordan Faison 11-yard pass from CJ Carr (Drive: 7 plays, 58 yards, 4:07; Notre Dame 21–0)

Second quarter

- (13:43) ND – Nolan James 1-yard run (Drive: 8 plays, 64 yards, 2:55; Notre Dame 28–0)
- (4:26) ND – Nolan James 1-yard run (Drive: 2 plays, 6 yards, 0:29; Notre Dame 35–0)
- (1:17) ND – Micah Gilbert 39-yard pass from CJ Carr (Drive: 2 plays, 38 yards, 0:42; Notre Dame 42–0)

Third quarter

- (11:41) ND – Cooper Flanagan 2-yard pass from CJ Carr (Drive: 6 plays, 75 yards, 3:19; Notre Dame 49–0)
- (3:51) ND – Spencer Porath 36-yard field goal (Drive: 10 plays, 49 yards, 5:01; Notre Dame 52–0)

Fourth quarter

- No scoring plays.

Statistics	RICE	ND
First downs	7	24
Plays–yards	46–128	65–578
Rushes–yards	36–34	32–118
Passing yards	64	360
Passing: comp–att–int	8–12–0	25–33–0
Turnovers	4	0
Time of possession	27:42	32:18

Team	Category	Player	Statistics
Rice	Passing	Jacurri Brown	8/12, 64 yards
Rice	Rushing	Jacurri Brown	16 carries, 32 yards
Rice	Receiving	Barry Jackson Jr.	1 reception, 30 yards
Notre Dame	Passing	CJ Carr	16/20, 253 yards, 4 TD
Notre Dame	Rushing	Jonaz Walton	8 carries, 48 yards
Notre Dame	Receiving	Jerome Bettis Jr.	2 receptions, 61 yards

=== Michigan State (rivalry) ===
Michigan State Spartans (2–0) at No. 3 Notre Dame Fighting Irish (2–0) – Game summary

Quarter	1	2	3	4	Total
Spartans	0	10	0	0	10
No. 3 Fighting Irish	10	7	3	7	27

at Notre Dame Stadium • Notre Dame, Indiana

- Date: September 19
- Game time: 7:30 p.m. EST
- Game weather: Cloudy, 71 °F (22 °C); Wind E 4 miles per hour (6.4 km/h)
- Game attendance: 77,622
- Referee: Gregory Blum
- TV announcers (NBC): Noah Eagle, Todd Blackledge, and Kathryn Tappen
- Box score, Recap

Game information

First quarter

- (12:06) ND – Spencer Porath 25-yard field goal (Drive: 5 plays, 68 yards, 2:54; Notre Dame 0–3)
- (4:31) ND – Nolan James Jr. 2-yard run (Drive: 11 plays, 41 yards, 6:06; Notre Dame 0–10)

Second quarter

- (10:05) MSU – Liam Boyd 32-field goal (Drive: 12 plays, 36 yards, 5:29; Michigan State 3–10)
- (4:46) ND – Aneyas Williams 1 Yd Run (Drive: 10 plays, 75 yards, 5:19; Notre Dame 3–17)
- (3:21) MSU – Cam Fancher 15 Yd Run (Drive: 3 plays, 68 yards, 1:17; Michigan State 10–20)

Third quarter

- (1:00) ND – Spencer Porath 35 Yd Field Goal (Drive: 17 plays, 77 yards, 9:42; Notre Dame 10–17)

Fourth quarter

- (13:08) ND – CJ Carr 3 Yd Run (Drive: 4 plays, 68 yards, 2:13; Notre Dame 10–27)

Statistics	MSU	ND
First downs	11	20
Plays–yards	45–167	67–395
Rushes–yards	27–44	43–161
Passing yards	123	234
Passing: comp–att–int	9–18–2	18–24–0
Turnovers	2	0
Time of possession	22:58	37:02

Team	Category	Player	Statistics
Michigan State	Passing	Alessio Milivojevic	9/17, 123 yards, 2 INT
Michigan State	Rushing	Cam Edwards	12 carries, 38 yards
Michigan State	Receiving	Rodney Bullard Jr.	2 receptions, 66 yards
Notre Dame	Passing	CJ Carr	18/24, 234 yards
Notre Dame	Rushing	Nolan James Jr.	26 carries, 121 yards, TD
Notre Dame	Receiving	Micah Gilbert	8 receptions, 170 yards

=== at Purdue (rivalry) ===
No. 3 Notre Dame Fighting Irish (3–0) at Purdue Boilermakers (1–2) – Game summary

Quarter	1	2	3	4	Total
No. 3 Fighting Irish	7	28	0	14	49
Boilermakers	0	0	3	7	10

at Ross–Ade Stadium • West Lafayette, Indiana

- Date: September 26
- Game time: 2:00 p.m. EST
- Game weather: Sunny • Temperature: 71 °F (22 °C) • Wind: NE at 5 miles per hour (8.0 km/h)
- Game attendance: 52,273
- Referee: Mike Roche
- TV announcers (Peacock): Paul Burmeister, Yogi Roth and Caroline Pineda
- Box score, Recap

Game information

First quarter

- (4:09) ND – Micah Gilbert 27 Yd pass from CJ Carr (Drive: 4 plays, 53 yards, 1:37; Notre Dame 0–7)

Second quarter

- (14:56) ND – Aneyas Williams 22 Yd Run (Drive: 4 plays, 86 yards, 1:22; Notre Dame 0–14)
- (5:47) ND – CJ Carr 1 Yd Run (Drive: 13 plays, 85 yards, 5:59; Notre Dame 0–21)
- (4:15) ND – Drayk Bowen 15 Yd Fumble Recovery (Drive: 5 plays, 68 yards, 2:54; Notre Dame 0–28)
- (0:29) ND – Nolan James Jr. 3 Yd pass from CJ Carr (Drive: 6 plays, 49 yards, 1:19; Notre Dame 0–35)

Third quarter

- (4:10) PUR – Jacobo Echeverria Lozano 47 Yd Field Goal (Drive: 6 plays, 20 yards, 3:35; Purdue 3–35)

Fourth quarter

- (13:32) ND – Cooper Flanagan 2 Yd pass from CJ Carr (Drive: 10 plays, 73 yards, 5:34; Notre Dame 3–42)
- (4:05) ND – Matt Jeffery 4 Yd pass from Noah Grubb] (Drive: 7 plays, 87 yards, 3:33; Notre Dame 3–49)
- (0:09) PUR – Bisi Owens 14 Yd pass from Evans Chuba (Drive: 10 plays, 75 yards, 3:59; Purdue 10–49)

Statistics	ND	PUR
First downs	19	16
Plays–yards	58–444	68–218
Rushes–yards	32–177	31–40
Passing yards	267	178
Passing: comp–att–int	16–26–1	25–37–0
Turnovers	1	1
Time of possession	24:44	35:16

Team	Category	Player	Statistics
Notre Dame	Passing	CJ Carr	14/22, 237 yards, 3 TD, INT
Notre Dame	Rushing	Aneyas Williams	14 carries, 80 yards, TD
Notre Dame	Receiving	Micah Gilbert	2 receptions, 83 yards, TD
Purdue	Passing	Ryan Browne	18/28, 111 yards
Purdue	Rushing	Fame Ijeboi	12 carries, 41 yards
Purdue	Receiving	Tra'Mar Harris	3 receptions, 36 yards

=== at North Carolina ===
No. 3 Notre Dame Fighting Irish (4–0) at North Carolina Tar Heels (2–1) – Game summary

Quarter	1	2	3	4	Total
No. 3 Fighting Irish	14	7	6	10	37
Tar Heels	7	7	6	6	26

at Kenan Stadium • Chapel Hill, North Carolina

- Date: October 3
- Game time: 12:00 p.m. EST
- Game weather: Cloudy • Temperature: 76 °F (24 °C) • Wind: NE at 8 miles per hour (13 km/h)
- Game attendance: 50,500
- Referee: Jerry Magallanes
- TV announcers (ESPN): Wes Durham, Dusty Dvoracek, and Taylor McGregor
- Box score, Recap

Game information

First quarter

- (9:34) UNC – Billy Edwards Jr. pass to Shamar Easter for 6 yds (Drive: 7 plays, 74 yards, 3:20; North Carolina 0–7)
- (6:41) ND – CJ Carr pass to Jordan Faison for 28 yds (Drive: 7 plays, 75 yards, 2:53; Notre Dame 7–7)
- (6:26) ND – CJ Carr pass to Jaden Greathouse for 12 yds (Drive: 1 play, 12 yards, 0:05; Notre Dame 14–7)

Second quarter

- (14:53) ND – CJ Carr pass to Jordan Faison for 39 yds (Drive: 11 plays, 77 yards, 3:55; Notre Dame 21–7)
- (0:21) UNC – Billy Edwards Jr. pass to Jelani Thurman for 14 yds (Drive: 15 plays, 97 yards, 7:13; North Carolina 21–14)

Third quarter

- (5:36) NDC – CJ Carr run for 3 yds (Drive: 17 plays, 75 yards, 9:10; Notre Dame 27–20)

Fourth quarter

- (14:54) ND – CJ Carr pass to Nolan James Jr. for 6 yds (Drive: 8 plays, 68 yards, 4:14; Notre Dame 34–20)
- (7:05) ND – Spencer Porath 31 yd field goal (Drive: 11 plays, 52 yards, 6:15; Notre Dame 34–20)
- (2:39) UNC – Billy Edwards Jr. pass to Jelani Thurman for 10 yds (Drive: 11 plays, 75 yards, 4:29; Notre Dame 34–26)

Statistics	ND	UNC
First downs	26	18
Plays–yards	72–475	54–285
Rushes–yards	43–242	26–77
Passing yards	234	208
Passing: comp–att–int	21–29–0	17–28–2
Turnovers	0	2
Time of possession	37:04	22:56

Team	Category	Player	Statistics
Notre Dame	Passing	CJ Carr	21/29, 234 yards, 4 TD, 0 INT
Notre Dame	Rushing	Jonaz Walton	22 carries, 108 yards
Notre Dame	Receiving	Jordan Faison	8 receptions, 132 yards, 2 TD
North Carolina	Passing	Billy Edwards Jr.	17/28, 208 yards, 3 TD, 2 INT
North Carolina	Rushing	Benjamin Hall	10 carries, 36 yards
North Carolina	Receiving	Jordan Shipp	7 receptions, 109 yards

=== Stanford (rivalry) ===
Stanford Cardinal (2–3) at No. 3 Notre Dame Fighting Irish (5–0) – Game summary

Quarter	1	2	3	4	Total
Cardinal	0	0	7	0	7
No. 3 Fighting Irish	14	23	7	14	58

at Notre Dame Stadium • Notre Dame, Indiana

- Date: October 10
- Game time: 12:30 p.m. PDT
- Game weather: Cloudy, 77 °F (25 °C); Wind: SE 13 miles per hour (21 km/h)
- Game attendance: 77,622
- Referee: Darryl DeBerry
- TV announcers (NBC): Dan Hicks, Jason Garrett, and Caroline Pineda
- Box score, Recap

Game information

First quarter

- (13:06) ND – Nolan James Jr. 2 Yd Run (Drive: 4 plays, 18 yards, 1:42; Notre Dame 7–0)
- (2:55) ND – Jaden Greathouse 3 Yd pass from CJ Carr (Drive: 12 plays, 70 yards, 6:46; Notre Dame 14–0)

Second quarter

- (14:48) ND – Jonaz Walton 97 Yd Run (Drive: 2 plays, 99 yards, 0:59; Notre Dame 20–0)
- (12:27) ND – Spencer Porath 33 Yd Field Goal (Drive: 4 plays, 4 yards, 1:27; Notre Dame 23–0)
- (7:05) ND – Nolan James Jr. 31 Yd Run (Drive: 3 plays, 39 yards, 1:15; Notre Dame 30–0)
- (3:26) ND – Aneyas Williams 70 Yd pass from CJ Carr (Drive: 3 plays, 81 yards, 0:56; Notre Dame 37-0)

Third quarter

- (4:37) ND – Elijah Burress 30 Yd pass from CJ Carr (Drive: 9 plays, 71 yards, 5:11; Notre Dame 44–0)
- (2:43) STAN – Benji Blackburn 3 Yd pass from Davis Warren (Drive: 5 plays, 75 yards, 1:54; Stanford 44–7)

Fourth quarter

- (13:47) ND – Jonaz Walton 40 Yd Run (Drive: 8 plays, 75 yards, 3:56; Notre Dame 51–7)
- (3:00) ND – Javian Osborne 3 Yd Run (Drive: 16 plays, 90 yards, 8:46; Notre Dame 58–7)

Statistics	STAN	ND
First downs	9	26
Plays–yards	44–202	74–598
Rushes–yards	19–58	54–361
Passing yards	144	237
Passing: comp–att–int	12–23–2	19–27–0
Turnovers	3	0
Time of possession	22:50	37:10

Team	Category	Player	Statistics
Stanford	Passing	Davis Warren	12/22, 144 yards, TD, INT
Stanford	Rushing	Micah Ford	13 carries, 48 yards
Stanford	Receiving	Caden High	3 receptions, 64 yards
Notre Dame	Passing	CJ Carr	14/20, 181 yards, 3 TD
Notre Dame	Rushing	Jonaz Walton	13 carries, 181 yards, 2 TD
Notre Dame	Receiving	Aneyas Williams	1 reception, 70 yards, TD

=== at No. 8 BYU ===
No. 2 Notre Dame Fighting Irish (6–0) at No. 8 BYU Cougars (5–0) – Game summary

Quarter	1	2	3	4	Total
No. 2 Fighting Irish	3	7	6	8	24
No. 8 Cougars	7	14	0	7	28

at LaVell Edwards Stadium • Provo, Utah

- Date: October 17
- Game time: 7:30 p.m.
- Game weather: Sunny, 73 °F (23 °C); Wind: W 3 miles per hour (4.8 km/h)
- Game attendance: 65,179
- TV announcers (ABC): Chris Fowler, Kirk Herbstreit, and Holly Rowe
- Box score, Recap

Game information

First quarter

- (9:21) BYU – Bear Bachmeier 5 Yd Run (Drive: 11 plays, 75 yards, 5:39; Notre Dame 7–0)
- (13:06) ND – Spencer Porath 46 Yd Field Goal (Drive: 4 plays, 18 yards, 1:42; Notre Dame 7–0)

Second quarter

- (10:37) ND – Nolan James Jr. 8 Yd Run (Drive: 12 plays, 84 yards, 5:45; Notre Dame 10–7)
- (5:52) BYU – Bear Bachmeier 15 Yd pass from Kyler Kasper (Drive: 10 plays, 75 yards, 4:45; BYU 10–14)
- (1:29) BYU – Bear Bachmeier 1 Yd Run (Drive: 8 plays, 72 yards, 2:50; BYU 10–21)

Third quarter

- (3:17) ND – Spencer Porath 31 Yd Field Goal (Drive: 10 plays, 28 yards, 4:06; Notre Dame 13–21)
- (0:11) ND – Spencer Porath 39 Yd Field Goal (Drive: 4 plays, 3 yards, 1:29; Notre Dame 16–21)

Fourth quarter

- (9:31) ND – Jonaz Walton 3 Yd Run (Drive: 9 plays, 68 yards, 4:40; Notre Dame 24–21)
- (1:47) BYU – Walker Lyons 6 Yd pass from Bear Bachmeier (Drive: 10 plays, 55 yards, 3:56; BYU 24–28)

Statistics	ND	BYU
First downs	22	23
Plays–yards	79–376	67–360
Rushes–yards	30–115	30–121
Passing yards	261	239
Passing: comp–att–int	27–49–0	24–37–1
Turnovers	1	2
Time of possession	30:58	29:02

Team	Category	Player	Statistics
Notre Dame	Passing	CJ Carr	27/49, 261 yards
Notre Dame	Rushing	Nolan James Jr.	16 carries, 77 yards, TD
Notre Dame	Receiving	Jaden Greathouse	8 receptions, 125 yards
BYU	Passing	Bear Bachmeier	23/36, 224 yards, TD, INT
BYU	Rushing	Preston Rex	10 carries, 66 yards
BYU	Receiving	Kyler Kasper	6 receptions, 66 yards

In the final play of the game, Notre Dame quarterback CJ Carr threw an incomplete pass intended for wide receiver Jaden Greathouse that was broken up by BYU cornerback Evan Johnson. Controversy arose when many analysts believed that Johnson should have been penalized for pass interference, as well as multiple shots showing the stadium clock having one second left when the ball touched the ground. After the game, the Big 12 Conference stated that the game clock had one second left when the game was declared over and that the play was incorrectly cleared by the replay officiating crew. Had the game not been declared over, Notre Dame would have had another attempt to score from BYU's 8-yard line. The game's ending has been compared to Michigan's controversial win over Western Michigan in September 2026.

=== vs. Navy (rivalry) ===
No. 5 Notre Dame Fighting Irish (6–1) vs. Navy Midshipmen (2–5) – Game summary

Quarter	1	2	3	4	Total
No. 5 Fighting Irish	7	7	14	7	35
Midshipmen	3	10	0	0	13

at Gillette Stadium • Foxborough, Massachusetts

- Date: October 31
- Game time: 12:00 p.m. EDT
- Game weather: Sunny, 51 °F (11 °C); Wind: NW 10 miles per hour (16 km/h)
- Game attendance: 61,293
- TV announcers (ABC): Bob Wischusen, Louis Riddick, and Stormy Buonantony
- Box score, Recap

Game information

First quarter

- (6:43) NAVY – Nolan Bartley 38 Yd Field Goal (Drive: 14 plays, 44 yards, 8:17; Navy 0–3)
- (1:47) ND – Micah Gilbert 11 Yd pass from CJ Carr (Drive: 11 plays, 75 yards, 4:56; Notre Dame 7–3)

Second quarter

- (8:04) NAVY – Nolan Bartley 26 Yd Field Goal (Drive: 16 plays, 66 yards, 8:43; Navy 7–6)
- (1:52) NAVY – Jackson Gutierrez 2 Yd Run (Drive: 11 plays, 63 yards, 5:38; Navy 7–13)
- (0:55) ND – Nolan James Jr. 52 Yd Run (Drive: 5 plays, 72 yards, 0:50; Notre Dame 14–13)

Third quarter

- (9:15) ND – Jonaz Walton 3 Yd Run (Drive: 11 plays, 78 yards, 5:39; Notre Dame 21-13)
- (3:09) ND – Nolan James Jr. 23 Yd Run (Drive: 7 plays, 69 yards, 3:40; Notre Dame 18-13)

Fourth quarter

- (14:55) ND – Jerome Bettis Jr. 31 Yd pass from CJ Carr (Drive: 2 plays, 43 yards, 0:11; Notre Dame 35–13)

Statistics	ND	NAVY
First downs	25	15
Plays–yards	59–426	57–245
Rushes–yards	29–204	48–212
Passing yards	222	33
Passing: comp–att–int	20–30–0	5–9–0
Turnovers	0	0
Time of possession	27:20	32:40

Team	Category	Player	Statistics
Notre Dame	Passing	CJ Carr	19/29, 210 yards, 2 TD
Notre Dame	Rushing	Nolan James Jr.	9 carries, 107 yards, 2 TD
Notre Dame	Receiving	Jerome Bettis Jr.	6 receptions, 78 yards, TD
Navy	Passing	Jackson Gutierrez	4/7, 25 yards
Navy	Rushing	Jackson Gutierrez	28 carries, 110 yards, TD
Navy	Receiving	Luke Hutchison	1 reception, 17 yards

=== No. 1 Miami (FL) ===
No. 1 Miami Hurricanes (8–0) at No. 11 Notre Dame Fighting Irish (7–1) – Game summary

Quarter	1	2	3	4	Total
No. 1 Hurricanes	0	3	14	7	24
No. 11 Fighting Irish	3	14	7	7	31

at Notre Dame Stadium • Notre Dame, Indiana

- Date: November 7
- Game time: 7:30 p.m. EST
- Game weather: Clear, 40 °F (4 °C); Wind: SW 3 miles per hour (4.8 km/h)
- Game attendance: 77,622
- Referee: Riley Johnson
- TV announcers (NBC): Noah Eagle, Todd Blackledge, Kathryn Tappen, and Caroline Pineda
- Box score, Recap

Game information

First quarter

- (9:38) ND – Spencer Porath 44 Yd Field Goal (Drive: 12 plays, 50 yards, 5:22; Notre Dame 3–0)

Second quarter

- (14:02) ND – Jordan Faison 27 Yd pass from CJ Carr (Drive: 4 plays, 65 yards, 1:22; Notre Dame 10–0)
- (6:25) MIA – Jake Weinberg 19 Yd Field Goal (Drive: 14 plays, 83 yards, 7:33; Notre Dame 10–3)
- (0:29) ND – Micah Gilbert 18 Yd pass from CJ Carr (Drive: 8 plays, 81 yards, 1:39; Notre Dame 17–3)

Third quarter

- (12:05) ND – Micah Gilbert 20 Yd pass from CJ Carr (Drive: 3 plays, 30 yards, 1:19; Notre Dame 24–3)
- (8:26) MIA – Elija Lofton 12 Yd pass from Darian Mensah (Drive: 11 plays, 65 yards, 3:39; Notre Dame 24–10)
- (5:29) MIA – Cooper Barkate 12 Yd pass from Darian Mensah (Drive: 6 plays, 52 yards, 1:58; Notre Dame 24–17)

Fourth quarter

- (12:55) ND – Nolan James Jr. 1 Yd Run (Drive: 8 plays, 51 yards, 3:49; Notre Dame 31–17)
- (9:53) MIA – Cooper Barkate 1 Yd pass from Darian Mensah (Drive: 7 plays, 75 yards, 3:02; Notre Dame 31–24)

Statistics	MIA	ND
First downs	21	22
Plays–yards	71–403	69–412
Rushes–yards	28–101	29–93
Passing yards	302	319
Passing: comp–att–int	24–43–1	29–40–0
Turnovers	2	0
Time of possession	29:05	30:55

Team	Category	Player	Statistics
Miami (FL)	Passing	Darian Mensah	24/43, 276 yards, 3 TD, INT
Miami (FL)	Rushing	Mark Fletcher Jr.	13 carries, 57 yards
Miami (FL)	Receiving	Elija Lofton	7 receptions, 113 yards, TD
Notre Dame	Passing	CJ Carr	29/40, 319 yards, 3 TD
Notre Dame	Rushing	Nolan James Jr.	16 carries, 52 yards, TD
Notre Dame	Receiving	Micah Gilbert	9 receptions, 98 yards, 2 TD

=== Boston College (Holy War) ===
Boston College Eagles (4–5) at No. 5 Notre Dame Fighting Irish (8–1) – Game summary

Quarter	1	2	3	4	Total
Eagles	0	0	7	0	7
No. 5 Fighting Irish	7	24	7	3	41

at Notre Dame Stadium • Notre Dame, Indiana

- Date: November 14
- Game time: 3:30 p.m. EST
- Game weather: Overcast, 46 °F (8 °C); Wind: NNW 7 miles per hour (11 km/h)
- Game attendance: 80,795
- TV announcers (NBC): Jason Benetti, Jason Garrett, and Caroline Pineda
- Box score, Recap

Game information

First quarter

- (9:00) ND – Micah Gilbert 26 Yd pass from CJ Carr (Drive: 10 plays, 85 yards, 5:27; Notre Dame 7–0)

Second quarter

- (8:53) ND – Nolan James Jr. 10 Yd Run (Notre Dame 14–0)
- (2:32) ND – Jonaz Walton 1 Yd Run (Notre Dame 21–0)
- (1:51) ND – Jaylen Sneed 1 Yd Fumble Return (Notre Dame 28–0)
- (0:02) ND – Spencer Porath 40 Yd Field Goal (Notre Dame 31–0)

Third quarter

- (13:40) BC – Bo MacCormack III 3 Yd Run (Boston College 31–7)
- (10:29) ND – Jordan Faison 13 Yd pass from CJ Carr (Notre Dame 38–7)

Fourth quarter

- (12:02) ND – Spencer Porath 37 Yd Field Goal (Notre Dame 41–7)

Statistics	BC	ND
First downs	9	24
Plays–yards	136	500
Rushes–yards	33-85	40-276
Passing yards	51	224
Passing: comp–att–int	8-24-1	21-32-1
Turnovers	2	2
Time of possession	24:28	35:32

Team	Category	Player	Statistics
Boston College	Passing	Mason McKenzie	8/21, 51 yards, INT
Boston College	Rushing	Mekhi Dodd	6 carries, 45 yards
Boston College	Receiving	Bo MacCormack III	3 receptions, 20 yards
Notre Dame	Passing	CJ Carr	20/28, 217 yards, 2 TD, INT
Notre Dame	Rushing	Jonaz Walton	15 carries, 141 yards, TD
Notre Dame	Receiving	Micah Gilbert	5 receptions, 86 yards, TD

=== SMU ===
SMU Mustangs (7–3) at No. 6 Notre Dame Fighting Irish (9–1) – Game summary

Quarter	1	2	3	4	Total
Mustangs	0	3	0	0	3
No. 6 Fighting Irish	7	10	7	0	24

at Notre Dame Stadium • Notre Dame, Indiana

- Date: November 21
- Game time: 6:30 p.m. CST / 7:30 p.m. EST
- Game weather: Clear, 54 °F (12 °C); Wind: S 6 miles per hour (9.7 km/h)
- Game attendance: 77,622
- TV announcers (NBC): Noah Eagle, Todd Blackledge, and Kathryn Tappen
- Box score, Recap

Game information

First quarter

- (1:49) ND – Cooper Flanagan 2 Yd Run (Drive: 11 plays, 99 yards, 5:10; Notre Dame 7–0)

Second quarter

- (8:50) SMU – Brendan Baird 40 Yd Field Goal (Drive: 16 plays, 52 yards, 7:59; Notre Dame 7–3)
- (5:28) ND – Jordan Faison 21 Yd pass from CJ Carr (Drive: 7 plays, 75 yards, 3:22; Notre Dame 14–3)
- (0:02) ND – Spencer Porath 32 Yd Field Goal (Drive: 5 plays, 63 yards, 0:31; Notre Dame 17–3)

Third quarter

- (11:31) ND – Nolan James Jr. 4 Yd Run (Drive: 7 plays, 75 yards, 3:29; Notre Dame 24–3)

Fourth quarter

- No scoring plays.

Statistics	SMU	ND
First downs	18	21
Total yards	70–327	64–464
Rushing yards	25–111	35–152
Passing yards	216	312
Passing: comp–att–int	24–45–1	19–29–1
Turnovers	1	2
Time of possession	28:46	31:14

Team	Category	Player	Statistics
SMU	Passing	Kevin Jennings	24/45, 216 yards, INT
SMU	Rushing	Kendrick Raphael	12 carries, 100 yards
SMU	Receiving	Yamir Knight	9 receptions, 115 yards
Notre Dame	Passing	CJ Carr	19/29, 312 yards, TD, INT
Notre Dame	Rushing	Nolan James Jr.	15 carries, 98 yards, TD
Notre Dame	Receiving	Jordan Faison	7 receptions, 109 yards, TD

=== at Syracuse ===
Notre Dame Fighting Irish (10–1) at Syracuse Orange (5–6) – Game summary

Quarter	1	2	3	4	Total
Fighting Irish	0	0	0	0	0
Orange	0	0	0	0	0

at JMA Wireless Dome • Syracuse, New York

- Date: November 28
- Game time: 12:00 p.m. EST
- TV: ABC

Game information

First quarter
Second quarter
Third quarter
Fourth quarter

Statistics	ND	SYR
First downs		
Plays–yards		
Rushes–yards		
Passing yards		
Passing: comp–att–int		
Turnovers		
Time of possession		

Team	Category	Player	Statistics
Notre Dame	Passing		
Notre Dame	Rushing		
Notre Dame	Receiving		
Syracuse	Passing		
Syracuse	Rushing		
Syracuse	Receiving		

== Personnel ==
=== Roster ===
2026 Notre Dame Fighting Irish football team roster
Players
Coaches
Offense

Pos.	#	Name	Class
WR	0	Quincy Porter (injured)	So
WR	1	Jaden Greathouse	Sr
RB	2	Nolan James Jr.	So
WR	3	Mylan Graham	Jr
WR	4	Bubba Frazier	Fr
WR	5	Cam Williams	Jr
WR	6	Jordan Faison (C)	Sr
TE	7	Ty Washington	5th
WR	8	Jerome Bettis Jr.	So
QB	9	Teddy Jarrard	Fr
QB	10	Noah Grubbs	Fr
WR	11	Devin Fitzgerald	Fr
QB	12	Blake Hebert	So
QB	13	CJ Carr (C)	Jr
WR	14	Micah Gilbert	Jr
WR	15	Brayden Robinson	Fr
WR	16	Dylan Faison	Fr
WR	17	Elijah Burress	So
WR	18	Kaydon Finley	Fr
WR	19	Logan Saldate	Jr
RB	20	Jonaz Walton	Fr
RB	21	Kedren Young	Jr
RB	22	Aneyas Williams	Jr
TE	24	Ian Premer	Fr
RB	26	Javian Osborne	Fr
WR	31	Xavier Southall (W)	Jr
WR	33	Matt Jeffery	Jr
RB	37	Kurt Smith (W)	So
TE	42	Henry Garrity (W)	Sr
RB	46	Matt Williams (W)	Sr
OL	50	Sullivan Garvin	Fr
OL	51	Ben Nichols	Fr
OL	52	Devan Houstan	Sr
OL	54	Anthonie Knapp	Jr
OL	55	Chris Terek	Sr
OL	56	Charles Jagusah	Sr
OL	57	Cam Herron	So
OL	58	Matty Augustine	So
OL	60	Max Anderson (W)	Jr
OL	61	Robbie Wollan (W)	Jr
OL	64	Joe Otting	Sr
OL	65	Grayson McKeogh	Fr
OL	66	Tyler Merrill	Fr
OL	67	Gregory Patrick	Fr
OL	68	Charlie Thom	Fr
OL	70	Ashton Craig	5th
OL	71	Styles Prescod	Jr
OL	74	Will Black (injured)	So
OL	75	Sullivan Absher	Sr
OL	76	Guerby Lambert	Jr
OL	77	Peter Jones	Jr
OL	78	Owen Strebig	So
TE	84	Preston Fryzel	Fr
TE	85	Jack Larsen	Jr
TE	87	Cooper Flanagan	Sr
TE	88	James Flanigan	So
TE	89	Austin Ratigan (W)	Fr

Defense

Pos.	#	Name	Class
DL	0	Tionne Gray	Jr
CB	1	Dallas Golden	So
CB	2	DJ McKinney (injured)	5th
LB	3	Jaylen Sneed	5th
LB	4	Jaiden Ausberry	Sr
DL	5	Boubacar Traore	Sr
DL	6	Christopher Burgess Jr.	So
DL	7	Francis Brewu	Jr
S	8	Adon Shuler (C)	Sr
S	9	Brauntae Johnson	Jr
DL	10	Loghan Thomas	Jr
DL	11	Keon Keeley	Sr
CB	12	Jayden Sanders	So
CB	13	Ayden Pouncey	Fr
DL	14	Ebenezer Ewetade	Fr
CB	15	Leonard Moore	Jr
LB	16	Ko'o Kia	So
LB	19	Madden Faraimo	So
S	20	Joey O'Brien	Fr
CB	21	Khary Adams	Fr
S	22	Ethan Long	So
LB	23	Ja'Kobe Clapper	Fr
CB	24	Mark Zackery IV	So
S	25	Brandon Logan	So
CB	26	Chaz Smith (injured)	Fr
LB	27	Kyngstonn Viliamu-Asa	Jr
S	28	Luke Talich	Sr
CB	29	Christian Gray	Sr
CB	30	Michael Giovacco (W)	Sr
CB	32	Nick Reddish	Fr
LB	34	Drayk Bowen (injured) (C)	Sr
LB	35	Teddy Rezac	Jr
LB	38	Tommy Powlus (W)	Jr
DL	40	Dominik Hulak	So
DL	42	Cole Mullins	Jr
LB	43	Kahanu Kia	Sr
DL	44	Rodney Dunham	Fr
DL	47	Jason Onye	5th
S	48	Chase Young (W)	So
DL	55	Tiki Hola (injured)	Fr
DL	56	Elijah Hughes	Sr
LB	58	Thomas Davis Jr.	Fr
DL	59	Sean Sevillano Jr.	Jr
DL	60	Davion Dixon	So
DL	88	Armel Mukam	Sr
DL	90	Elijah Golden	Fr
DL	91	Gordy Sulfsted	So
DL	94	Joe Reiff	So
DL	95	Bryce Young	Jr

Special teams

Pos.	#	Name	Class
P	18	Erik Schmidt	So
K	35	Spencer Porath	Jr
K	36	Micah Drescher	Fr
P	39	Jasper Scaife	Fr
LS	49	Andrew Kros (W)	Sr
LS	96	Joseph Vinci	Jr

Head coach

- Marcus Freeman

Coordinators/assistant coaches

- Ja'Juan Seider – Associate head coach/running backs
- Mike Denbrock – Offensive coordinator/tight ends
- Chris Ash – Defensive coordinator
- Aaron Henry – Co-defensive coordinator/defensive backs
- Marty Biagi – Special teams coordinator/assistant defensive backs
- Gino Guidugli – Quarterbacks/pass game coordinator
- Mike Brown – Wide receivers
- Joe Rudolph – Offensive line
- Charlie Partridge – Defensive line
- Brian Jean-Mary – Linebackers/run game coordinator
- Jevaughn Codlin – Safeties

Legend

- (C) Team captain
- (S) Suspended
- (I) Ineligible
- (W) Walk-on
- Injured
- Redshirt

Roster
Last update: November 19, 2026

=== Depth chart ===
- Depth chart is a projection and is subject to change.

Defense

NB
Christian Gray
Dallas Golden
–

FS
Luke Talich
Joey O'Brien
–

WLB	SLB
Jaiden Ausberry	Kyngstonn Viliamu-Asa
Jaylen Sneed	Madden Faraimo
–	Ko'o Kia

BS
Adon Shuler
Ethan Long
–

CB
Jayden Sanders
Ayden Pouncey
–

DE	DT	DT	DE
Bryce Young	Tionne Gray	Armel Mukam	Boubacar Traore
Keon Keeley	Jason Onye	Francis Brewu	Loghan Thomas
–	Sean Sevillano Jr.	Elijah Hughes	Rodney Dunham

CB
Leonard Moore
Mark Zackery IV
–

Offense

WR-X
Jordan Faison
Matt Jeffery
Logan Saldate

WR-F
Jaden Greathouse
Mylan Graham
Bubba Frazier

LT	LG	C	RG	RT
Styles Prescod	Anthonie Knapp	Ashton Craig	Sullivan Absher	Guerby Lambert
Grayson McKeogh	Cam Herron	Joe Otting	Matty Augustine	Owen Strebig
–	–	–	–	–

TE
Cooper Flanagan
James Flanigan
Jack Larsen

WR-Z
Micah Gilbert
Jerome Bettis Jr.
Elijah Burress

QB
CJ Carr
Noah Grubbs
Teddy Jarrard

Key reserves
QB Blake Hebert
RB Kedren Young
WR Cam Williams
TE Ty Washington
OL Devan Houstan, Charles Jagusah, Peter Jones, Chris Terek
DL Christopher Burgess Jr., Davion Dixon, Dominik Hulak, Cole Mullins, Joe Reiff, Gordy Sulfsted
LB Kahanu Kia, Teddy Rezac
S Brauntae Johnson, Brandon Logan

Special teams
PK Spencer Porath (PK)
Erik Schmidt (KO)
P Jasper Scaife
KR Jonaz Walton
Aneyas Williams
PR Jordan Faison
LS Joseph Vinci
H Jasper Scaife

RB
Nolan James Jr.
Jonaz Walton
Aneyas Williams

=== Injuries ===
Player	Position	Injury	Status
Will Black	OL	Concussion	Out for game vs. SMU
Drayk Bowen	LB	Right ankle	Out for game vs. SMU
Tiki Hola	DL	Right knee	Out for game vs. SMU
DJ McKinney	CB	Right ankle	Out for game vs. SMU
Quincy Porter	WR	Left knee	Out for season
Chaz Smith	CB	Left knee	Out for season

== Rankings ==
Ranking movements Legend: ██ Increase in ranking ██ Decrease in ranking ( ) = First-place votes
	Week															
Poll	Pre	1	2	3	4	5	6	7	8	9	10	11	12	13	14	Final
AP	4 (6)	3 (4)	3 (1)	3	3	3	2 (1)	4	5	4	3 (5)	3 (2)	3 (1)			
Coaches	5 (5)	4 (4)	3 (4)	3 (2)	3 (3)	3 (1)	2 (3)	8	6	6	3 (2)	3 (1)	3 (1)			
CFP	Not released									11	5	6				Not released
