= 2026 Stanford Cardinal football team =

American college football season

2026 Stanford Cardinal football
- Conference: Atlantic Coast Conference
- Record: 6–5 (4–4 ACC)
- Head coach: Tavita Pritchard (1st season)
- Offensive coordinator: Terry Heffernan (1st season)
- Offensive scheme: Multiple
- Defensive coordinator: Kris Richard (1st season)
- Base defense: 4–3
- Home stadium: Stanford Stadium

Uniform

2026 Atlantic Coast Conference football standings
	Conf.			Overall
Team	W		L	W		L
No. 7 Miami (FL) y	8	–	0	10	–	1
No. 11 Wake Forest y	7	–	1	10	–	1
No. 23 Louisville	7	–	2	8	–	3
Clemson	5	–	3	7	–	4
SMU	5	–	3	7	–	4
Duke	4	–	4	7	–	4
Stanford	4	–	4	6	–	5
Virginia	4	–	4	6	–	5
Boston College	3	–	4	5	–	6
Pittsburgh	3	–	5	6	–	5
Virginia Tech	3	–	5	6	–	5
NC State	3	–	5	5	–	6
Florida State	3	–	5	5	–	6
Syracuse	3	–	6	5	–	6
North Carolina	2	–	5	5	–	6
California	2	–	6	3	–	8
Georgia Tech	2	–	6	3	–	8
Championship: Miami (FL) vs. Wake Forest
^ – College Football Playoff participant; $ – Conference champion; y – Championship game participant; As of November 22, 2026; Rankings from CFP rankings

The 2026 Stanford Cardinal football team currently represents Stanford University as they are in the Atlantic Coast Conference (ACC) during the 2026 NCAA Division I FBS football season. The Cardinal is led by new head coach Tavita Pritchard in his first year as the head coach. The Cardinal play their home games at Stanford Stadium located in Stanford, California.

== Schedule ==
Date	Time	Opponent	Site	TV	Result	Attendance
August 29	4:00 p.m.	Hawaii*	Stanford Stadium; Stanford, CA	ACCN	W 37–27	23,222
September 4	6:00 p.m.	No. 7 Miami (FL)	Stanford Stadium; Stanford, CA	ESPN	L 6–45	37,648
September 19	1:00 p.m.	at Duke	Wallace Wade Stadium; Durham, NC	The CW	L 7–35	19,139
September 26	7:30 p.m.	Georgia Tech	Stanford Stadium; Stanford, CA	ESPN	W 34–27	23,455
October 3	9:00 a.m.	at Wake Forest	Allegacy Federal Credit Union Stadium; Winston-Salem, NC	ACCN	L 3–57	29,188
October 10	12:30 p.m.	at No. 3 Notre Dame*	Notre Dame Stadium; South Bend, IN (Legends Trophy)	NBC	L 7–58	77,622
October 17	4:30 p.m.	Elon*^{†}	Stanford Stadium; Stanford, CA	ACCNX	W 34–7	18,940
October 23	7:30 p.m.	NC State	Stanford Stadium; Stanford, CA	ESPN	W 31–28	13,949
October 31	12:15 p.m.	at Louisville	L&N Federal Credit Union Stadium; Louisville, KY	ACCN	L 24–52	44,308
November 14	4:30 p.m.	at Virginia Tech	Lane Stadium; Blacksburg, VA	ACCN	W 40–22	65,632
November 21	4:30 p.m.	at California	California Memorial Stadium; Berkeley, CA (Big Game)	ACCN	W 44–28	54,283
November 28	12:30 p.m.	SMU	Stanford Stadium; Stanford, CA	ACCN		
*Non-conference game; ^{†}Homecoming; Rankings from AP Poll (and CFP Rankings, after November 3) – Released prior to game; All times are in Pacific time

== Game summaries ==
=== vs. Hawaii ===
Hawaii Rainbow Warriors (0–0) at Stanford Cardinal (0–0) – Game summary

Quarter	1	2	3	4	Total
Rainbow Warriors	0	7	0	20	27
Cardinal	7	7	9	14	37

at Stanford Stadium • Stanford, California

- Date: August 29
- Game time: 4:00 p.m. PDT
- Game weather: Sunny
- Game attendance: 23,222
- Referee: Brad Carrell
- TV announcers (ACCN): Jorge Sedano, Rodney McLeod, and Kendra Douglas

Game information

First quarter

- STAN – Micah Ford 2-yard run (Emmet Kenney kick), 8:37. Cardinal 7–0. Drive: 9 plays, 89 yards, 4:08.

Second quarter

- HAW – DeVon Rice 3-yard run (Sean Olvera-Harle kick), 10:18. Tied 7–7. Drive: 8 plays, 55 yards, 3:55.
- STAN – Atticus Joseph 6-yard pass from Davis Warren (Emmet Kenney kick), 7:02. Cardinal 14–7. Drive: 8 plays, 75 yards, 3:16.

Third quarter

- STAN – Team Safety, 13:32. Cardinal 16–7.
- STAN – Micah Ford 2-yard run (Emmet Kenney kick), 9:51. Cardinal 23–7. Drive: 8 plays, 64 yards, 3:30.

Fourth quarter

- HAW – Sitani Mikaele 5-yard run (Tama Uiliata run), 12:43. Cardinal 23–15. Drive: 16 plays, 80 yards, 5:14.
- HAW – Tama Uiliata 11-yard pass from Micah Alejado (pass failed), 9:39. Cardinal 23–21. Drive: 5 plays, 63 yards, 1:31.
- HAW – DeVon Rice 29-yard pass from Micah Alejado (Sean Olver-Harle kick failed), 4:06. Rainbow Warriors 27–23. Drive: 9 plays, 90 yards, 3:12.
- STAN – Micah Ford 2-yard run (Emmet Kenney kick), 1:41. Cardinal 30–27. Drive: 7 plays, 60 yards, 2:18.
- STAN – Tevarua Tafiti 31-yard fumble return (Emmet Kenney kick), 1:12. Cardinal 37–27.

Statistics	HAW	STAN
First downs	18	21
Plays–yards	74–322	71–483
Rushes–yards	22–46	37–173
Passing yards	276	310
Passing: comp–att–int	31–52–0	22–34–0
Turnovers	1	0
Time of possession	29:06	30:54

Team	Category	Player	Statistics
Hawaii	Passing	Micah Alejado	30/50, 269 yards, 2 TD
Hawaii	Rushing	DeVon Rice	11 carries, 35 yards, TD
Hawaii	Receiving	Kainoa Carvalho	5 receptions, 72 yards
Stanford	Passing	Davis Warren	22/34, 310 yards, TD
Stanford	Rushing	Micah Ford	25 carries, 99 yards, 3 TD
Stanford	Receiving	JonAnthony Hall	2 receptions, 81 yards

=== vs. No. 7 Miami (FL) ===
No. 7 Miami Hurricanes (0–0) at Stanford Cardinal (1–0) – Game summary

Quarter	1	2	3	4	Total
No. 7 Hurricanes	14	14	14	3	45
Cardinal	3	3	0	0	6

at Stanford Stadium • Stanford, California

- Date: September 4
- Game time: 6:00 p.m. PDT
- Game weather: Sunny • Temperature: 73 °F (23 °C) • Wind: 0 miles per hour (0 km/h)
- Game attendance: 37,648
- TV announcers (ESPN): Mike Monaco, Jordan Rodgers, and Dana Boyle

Game information

First quarter

- MIA – Malachi Toney 23-yard pass from Darian Mensah (Jake Weinberg kick), 12:07. Hurricanes 7–0. Drive: 4 plays, 77 yards, 1:40.
- STAN – Emmet Kenney 30-yard field goal, 7:57. Hurricanes 7–3. Drive: 10 plays, 63 yards, 4:10.
- MIA – Malachi Toney 2-yard pass from Darian Mensah (Jake Weinberg kick), 2:53. Hurricanes 14–3. Drive: 10 plays, 75 yards, 4:58.

Second quarter

- MIA – CharMar Brown 5-yard run (Jake Weinberg kick), 7:52. Hurricanes 21–3. Drive: 8 plays, 89 yards, 3:56.
- MIA – Daylen Upshaw 5-yard pass from Darian Mensah (Jake Weinberg kick), 1:55. Hurricanes 28–3. Drive: 11 plays, 65 yards, 4:50.
- STAN – Emmet Kenney 24-yard field goal, 0:27. Hurricanes 28–6. Drive: 12 plays, 69 yards, 1:28.

Third quarter

- MIA – Cooper Barkate 34-yard pass from Darian Mensah (Jake Weinberg kick), 11:51. Hurricanes 35–6. Drive: 7 plays, 75 yards, 3:09.
- MIA – Malachi Toney 47-yard pass from Darian Mensah (Jake Weinberg kick), 5:24. Hurricanes 42–6. Drive: 8 plays, 87 yards, 3:58.

Fourth quarter

- MIA – Jake Weinberg 46-yard field goal, 1:59. Hurricanes 45–6. Drive: 6 plays, 35 yards, 3:05.

Statistics	MIA	STAN
First downs	27	17
Plays–yards	67–548	65–299
Rushes–yards	32–121	23–78
Passing yards	428	221
Passing: comp–att–int	30–35–1	22–42–0
Turnovers	2	0
Time of possession	36:34	23:26

Team	Category	Player	Statistics
Miami (FL)	Passing	Darian Mensah	27/30, 401 yards, 5 TD
Miami (FL)	Rushing	Mark Fletcher Jr.	13 carries, 40 yards
Miami (FL)	Receiving	Malachi Toney	12 receptions, 234 yards, 3 TD
Stanford	Passing	Davis Warren	21/41, 214 yards
Stanford	Rushing	Sedrick Irvin	6 carries, 41 yards
Stanford	Receiving	Caden High	6 receptions, 92 yards

=== at Duke ===
Stanford Cardinal (1–1) at Duke Blue Devils (2–0) – Game summary

Quarter	1	2	3	4	Total
Cardinal	0	7	0	0	7
Blue Devils	0	14	14	7	35

at Wallace Wade Stadium • Durham, North Carolina

- Date: September 19
- Game time: 1:00 p.m. PDT
- Game weather: Sunny • Temperature: 85 °F (29 °C) • Wind: W at 7 miles per hour (11 km/h)
- Game attendance: 19,139
- Referee: Jerry Magallanes
- TV announcers (The CW): Rick Allen, Jason Cabinda and Wes Bryant

Statistics	STAN	DUKE
First downs	15	22
Plays–yards	58–237	71–470
Rushes–yards	22–73	47–268
Passing yards	164	202
Passing: comp–att–int	20–36–0	14–24–1
Turnovers	1	1
Time of possession	22:46	37:14

Team	Category	Player	Statistics
Stanford	Passing	Davis Warren	18/32, 151 yards, TD
Stanford	Rushing	Micah Ford	11 carries, 76 yards
Stanford	Receiving	Caden High	5 receptions, 43 yards, TD
Duke	Passing	Walker Eget	14/24, 202 yards, TD, INT
Duke	Rushing	Nate Sheppard	23 carries, 154 yards, 2 TD
Duke	Receiving	Jeremiah Hasley	5 receptions, 88 yards

=== vs. Georgia Tech ===
Georgia Tech Yellow Jackets (1–2) at Stanford Cardinal (1–2) – Game summary

Quarter	1	2	3	4	Total
Yellow Jackets	0	0	0	0	0
Cardinal	0	0	0	0	0

at Stanford Stadium • Stanford, California

- Date: September 26
- Game time: 7:30 p.m. PDT
- TV announcers (ESPN): Roy Philpott, Brock Osweiler and Sherree Burruss

Statistics	GT	STAN
First downs		
Plays–yards		
Rushes–yards		
Passing yards		
Passing: comp–att–int		
Time of possession		

Team	Category	Player	Statistics
Georgia Tech	Passing		
Georgia Tech	Rushing		
Georgia Tech	Receiving		
Stanford	Passing		
Stanford	Rushing		
Stanford	Receiving		

=== at Wake Forest ===
Stanford Cardinal (2–2) at Wake Forest Demon Deacons (3–1) – Game summary

Quarter	1	2	3	4	Total
Cardinal	0	3	0	0	3
Demon Deacons	15	14	14	14	57

at Allegacy Federal Credit Union Stadium • Winston-Salem, North Carolina

- Date: October 3
- Game time: 9:00 a.m. PDT
- Game weather: Sunny
- Game attendance: 29,188
- Referee: Jon Noli
- TV announcers (ACCN): Jorge Sedano, Rodney McLeod, and Kendra Douglas

Statistics	STAN	WAKE
First downs	13	26
Plays–yards	67–197	67–519
Rushes–yards	34–49	37–197
Passing yards	148	322
Passing: comp–att–int	21–33–1	22–30–0
Turnovers	1	1
Time of possession	31:14	28:46

Team	Category	Player	Statistics
Stanford	Passing	Davis Warren	19/30, 136 yards, INT
Stanford	Rushing	Micah Ford	16 carries, 45 yards
Stanford	Receiving	Nico Brown	4 receptions, 42 yards
Wake Forest	Passing	Gio Lopez	20/27, 265 yards, 2 TD
Wake Forest	Rushing	Gio Lopez	12 carries, 88 yards, 3 TD
Wake Forest	Receiving	Carlos Hernandez	7 receptions, 87 yards

=== at No. 3 Notre Dame (rivalry) ===
Stanford Cardinal (2–3) at No. 3 Notre Dame Fighting Irish (5–0) – Game summary

Quarter	1	2	3	4	Total
Cardinal	0	0	7	0	7
No. 3 Fighting Irish	14	23	7	14	58

at Notre Dame Stadium • Notre Dame, Indiana

- Date: October 10
- Game time: 12:30 p.m. PDT
- Game weather: Cloudy, 77 °F (25 °C); Wind: SE 13 miles per hour (21 km/h)
- Game attendance: 77,622
- Referee: Darryl DeBerry
- TV announcers (NBC): Dan Hicks, Jason Garrett, and Caroline Pineda

Game information

First quarter

- (13:06) ND – Nolan James Jr. 2 Yd Run (Drive: 4 plays, 18 yards, 1:42; Notre Dame 7–0)
- (2:55) ND – Jaden Greathouse 3 Yd pass from CJ Carr (Drive: 12 plays, 70 yards, 6:46; Notre Dame 14–0)

Second quarter

- (14:48) ND – Jonaz Walton 97 Yd Run (Drive: 2 plays, 99 yards, 0:59; Notre Dame 20–0)
- (12:27) ND – Spencer Porath 33 Yd Field Goal (Drive: 4 plays, 4 yards, 1:27; Notre Dame 23–0)
- (7:05) ND – Nolan James Jr. 31 Yd Run (Drive: 3 plays, 39 yards, 1:15; Notre Dame 30–0)
- (3:26) ND – Aneyas Williams 70 Yd pass from CJ Carr (Drive: 3 plays, 81 yards, 0:56; Notre Dame 37-0)

Third quarter

- (4:37) ND – Elijah Burress 30 Yd pass from CJ Carr (Drive: 9 plays, 71 yards, 5:11; Notre Dame 44–0)
- (2:43) STAN – Benji Blackburn 3 Yd pass from Davis Warren (Drive: 5 plays, 75 yards, 1:54; Stanford 44–7)

Fourth quarter

- (13:47) ND – Jonaz Walton 40 Yd Run (Drive: 8 plays, 75 yards, 3:56; Notre Dame 51–7)
- (3:00) ND – Javian Osborne 3 Yd Run (Drive: 16 plays, 90 yards, 8:46; Notre Dame 58–7)

Statistics	STAN	ND
First downs	9	26
Plays–yards	44–202	74–598
Rushes–yards	19–58	54–361
Passing yards	144	237
Passing: comp–att–int	12–23–2	19–27–0
Turnovers	3	0
Time of possession	22:50	37:10

Team	Category	Player	Statistics
Stanford	Passing	Davis Warren	12/22, 144 yards, TD, INT
Stanford	Rushing	Micah Ford	13 carries, 48 yards
Stanford	Receiving	Caden High	3 receptions, 64 yards
Notre Dame	Passing	CJ Carr	14/20, 181 yards, 3 TD
Notre Dame	Rushing	Jonaz Walton	13 carries, 181 yards, 2 TD
Notre Dame	Receiving	Aneyas Williams	1 reception, 70 yards, TD

=== vs. Elon (FCS) ===
Elon Phoenix (FCS) (4–3) at Stanford Cardinal (2–4) – Game summary

Quarter	1	2	3	4	Total
Phoenix (FCS)	0	0	0	7	7
Cardinal	0	14	14	6	34

at Stanford Stadium • Stanford, California

- Date: October 17
- Game time: 4:30 p.m.
- Game attendance: 18,940
- TV announcers (ACCNX): Doug Sherman, Forrest Conoly

Game information

First quarter
Second quarter
Third quarter
Fourth quarter

Statistics	ELON	STAN
First downs	15	27
Total yards	272	515
Rushes–yards	34–220	33–222
Passing yards	52	293
Passing: comp–att–int	8–27–0	29–41–0
Turnovers	0	1
Time of possession	27:11	32:49

Team	Category	Player	Statistics
Elon	Passing	TJ Crews IV	8–27, 52 yards
Elon	Rushing	Kamerin McDowell-Moore	21 carries, 164 yards, TD
Elon	Receiving	Landyn Backey	2 receptions, 19 yards
Stanford	Passing	Davis Warren	27–39, 279 yards, TD
Stanford	Rushing	Micah Ford	19 carries, 179 yards, 4 TD
Stanford	Receiving	JonAnthony Hall	5 receptions, 70 yards

=== vs. NC State ===
NC State Wolfpack (3–3) at Stanford Cardinal (3–4) – Game summary

Quarter	1	2	3	4	Total
Wolfpack	7	7	0	14	28
Cardinal	14	7	7	3	31

at Stanford Stadium • Stanford, California

- Date: October 23
- Game time: 7:30 p.m. PDT
- Game attendance: 13,949
- TV announcers (ESPN): Anish Shroff, Andre Ware

Statistics	NCSU	STAN
First downs	21	27
Total yards	381	477
Rushes–yards	33–125	33–174
Passing yards	256	303
Passing: comp–att–int	17–31–0	22–37–0
Turnovers	0	0
Time of possession	29:59	30:01

Team	Category	Player	Statistics
NC State	Passing	CJ Bailey	17–30, 256 yards, 2 TD
NC State	Rushing	CJ Bailey	9 carries, 59 yards
NC State	Receiving	Deandre Desinor	3 receptions, 79 yards, TD
Stanford	Passing	Davis Warren	22–37, 303 yards, 4 TD
Stanford	Rushing	Micah Ford	22 carries, 150 yards
Stanford	Receiving	Caden High	9 receptions, 103 yards, TD

=== at Louisville ===
Stanford Cardinal (4–4) at Louisville Cardinals (4–3) – Game summary

Quarter	1	2	3	4	Total
Cardinal	0	17	7	0	24
Cardinals	7	17	21	7	52

at L&N Federal Credit Union Stadium • Louisville, Kentucky

- Date: October 31
- Game time: 12:15 p.m. PDT
- Game weather: Cloudy • Temperature: 66 °F (19 °C) • Wind: SE at 5 miles per hour (8.0 km/h)
- Game attendance: 44,308
- Referee: Jon Noli
- TV announcers (ACCN): Jorge Sedano, Rodney McLeod, Anabella Hasselbeck

Game information

First quarter

- (11:25) LOU – Isaac Brown 5-yard run (Carson Hilbert kick) (Drive: 7 plays, 80 yards, 3:27; Louisville 7–0)

Second quarter

- (13:35) STAN – Emmet Kenney 48-yard field goal (Drive: 8 plays, 32 yards, 3:33; Louisville 7–3)
- (10:41) STAN – Nico Brown 41-yard pass from Davis Warren (Emmet Kenney kick) (Drive: 2 plays, 50 yards, 0:34; Stanford 10–7)
- (5:26) LOU – Lincoln Kienholz 1-yard run (Carson Hilbert kick) (Drive: 9 plays, 60 yards, 5:15; Louisville 14–10)
- (5:16) STAN – Aiden Black 75-yard pass from Davis Warren (Emmet Kenney kick) (Drive: 1 play, 75 yards, 0:10; Stanford 17–14)
- (1:46) LOU – Carson Hilbert 35-yard field goal (Drive: 9 plays, 58 yards, 3:30; Tied 17–17)
- (0:15) LOU – TreyShun Hurry 22-yard pass from Lincoln Kienholz (Carson Hilbert kick) (Drive: 5 plays, 41 yards, 0:40; Louisville 24–17)

Third quarter

- (12:46) STAN – Micah Ford 40-yard pass from Davis Warren (Emmet Kenney kick) (Drive: 6 plays, 75 yards, 2:14; Tied 24–24)
- (10:57) LOU – Isaac Brown 18-yard pass from Lincoln Kienholz (Carson Hilbert kick) (Drive: 5 plays, 75 yards, 1:49; Louisville 31–24)
- (3:34) LOU – Tayon Holloway 31-yard fumble return (Carson Hilbert kick) (Louisville 38–24)
- (0:27) LOU – Isaac Brown 23-yard run (Carson Hilbert kick) (Drive: 3 plays, 53 yards, 1:28; Louisville 45–24)

Fourth quarter

- (10:01) LOU – Isaac Brown 75-yard run (Carson Hilbert kick) (Drive: 1 play, 75 yards, 0:12; Louisville 7–0)

Statistics	STAN	LOU
First downs	15	22
Total yards	351	545
Rushes–yards	31–81	33–296
Passing yards	270	249
Passing: comp–att–int	23–38–1	21–29–0
Turnovers	2	1
Time of possession	30:42	29:18

Team	Category	Player	Statistics
Stanford	Passing	Davis Warren	23–37, 270 yards, 3 TD, INT
Stanford	Rushing	Micah Ford	20 carries, 72 yards
Stanford	Receiving	Nico Brown	6 receptions, 109 yards, TD
Louisville	Passing	Lincoln Kienholz	20–28, 250 yards, 2 TD
Louisville	Rushing	Isaac Brown	9 carries, 139 yards, 3 TD
Louisville	Receiving	Tre Richardson	10 receptions, 140 yards

=== at Virginia Tech ===
Stanford Cardinal (4–5) at Virginia Tech Hokies (6–3) – Game summary

Quarter	1	2	3	4	Total
Cardinal	7	17	3	13	40
Hokies	0	7	7	8	22

at Lane Stadium • Blacksburg, Virginia

- Date: November 14
- Game time: 4:30 p.m. PDT

Statistics	STAN	VT
First downs	21	18
Plays–yards	72–436	73–398
Rushes–yards	41–233	39–128
Passing yards	203	270
Passing: comp–att–int	16–31–0	17–34–2
Time of possession	33:21	26:39

Team	Category	Player	Statistics
Stanford	Passing	Davis Warren	16/31, 203 yards
Stanford	Rushing	Micah Ford	27 carries, 149 yards, 3 TD
Stanford	Receiving	Benji Blackburn	3 receptions, 63 yards
Virginia Tech	Passing	Ethan Grunkemeyer	17/34, 270 yards, 2 TD, 2 INT
Virginia Tech	Rushing	Jeffrey Overton Jr.	19 carries, 107 yards, TD
Virginia Tech	Receiving	Davion Brown	2 receptions, 81 yards, TD

=== at California (The Big Game) ===
Stanford Cardinal (5–5) at California Golden Bears (3–7) – Game summary

Quarter	1	2	3	4	Total
Cardinal	0	0	0	0	0
Golden Bears	0	0	0	0	0

at California Memorial Stadium • Berkeley, California

- Date: November 21
- Game time: TBD

Statistics	STAN	CAL
First downs		
Plays–yards		
Rushes–yards		
Passing yards		
Passing: comp–att–int		
Time of possession		

Team	Category	Player	Statistics
Stanford	Passing		
Stanford	Rushing		
Stanford	Receiving		
California	Passing		
California	Rushing		
California	Receiving		

=== vs. SMU ===
SMU Mustangs (7–4) at Stanford Cardinal (6–5) – Game summary

Quarter	1	2	3	4	Total
Mustangs	0	0	0	0	0
Cardinal	0	0	0	0	0

at Stanford Stadium • Stanford, California

- Date: November 28
- Game time: TBD

Statistics	SMU	STAN
First downs		
Plays–yards		
Rushes–yards		
Passing yards		
Passing: comp–att–int		
Time of possession		

Team	Category	Player	Statistics
SMU	Passing		
SMU	Rushing		
SMU	Receiving		
Stanford	Passing		
Stanford	Rushing		
Stanford	Receiving		

== Roster ==
2025 Stanford Cardinal football team roster
Players
Coaches
Offense

Pos.	#	Name	Class
WR	0	Caden High	Jr
WR	3	Marcus Brown	RFr
WR	4	Jordan	RSo
RB	5	Chris Davis Jr.	So
RB	6	Tuna Altahir	GS
QB	8	Davis Warren	GS
QB	9	Mike Mitchell Jr.	Fr
QB	10	Dylan Rizk	RSo
WR	11	JonAnthony Hall	Fr
WR	13	Liam Thorpe	Fr
WR	15	Carter Shaw	RSo
QB	17	Charlie Mirer	RSr
WR	18	Langdon Horace	Fr
WR	19	David Pantelis	GS
RB	20	Micah Ford	So
WR	23	Nico Brown	RJr
RB	26	Sedrick Irvin	Jr
WR	32	Owen van Loben Sels	RFr
RB	34	Champ Hampton	RSo
OL	51	Zion Brown	RFr
OL	53	Nathan Mejia	RJr
OL	55	Simione Pale	Jr
OL	56	Hayden Gunter	RFr
OL	58	Kahlil House	So
OL	59	Charlie Hoitink	RFr
OL	60	Nick Fattig	RSo
OT	62	Josh Williams	Fr
OL	63	Carson Caplan	RFr
OL	66	Niki Prongos	RJr
OL	72	Dara Adeyemi	RSo
OL	73	Charlie Symonds	RSo
OL	74	Fisher Anderson	RJr
OL	79	Kai Greer	RFr
WR	82	Tyler Kuo	RSo
TE	83	Reiman Zebert	Fr
TE	84	Chico Holt	RSo
TE	85	Zach Giuliano	Fr
TE	87	Aiden Black	RFr
TE	88	Benji Blackburn	So

Defense

Pos.	#	Name	Class
ILB	0	Jahsiah Glavan	RJr
OLB	2	Dylan Stephenson	RFr
S	3	Jaylen'Dai Sumlin	So
CB	4	Leroy Bryant	RSo
S	5	Jay Green	RJr
CB	8	Cam Richardson	So
CB	9	Brandon Nicholson	So
ILB	10	Sam Mattingly	So
OLB	11	Tevarua Tafiti	RJr
S	15	Donte Utu	Fr
S	17	Omari Gaines	Fr
S	21	Scotty Edwards	RJr
DB	22	Zaiden McDonald	Fr
ILB	23	Wassie Lugolobi	Fr
DB	24	Lonnie McCallister III	Fr
ILB	25	Bo Tate	RFr
CB	26	Chris Garland	Fr
CB	27	Breylan Thompson	So
CB	28	Sam Neely III	RFr
S	29	Darrius Davis	So
CB	31	Aaron Morris	Jr
CB	34	Javion Randall	RFr
ILB	35	Matt Rose	RJr
OLB	36	Tre Williams	RSo
ILB	38	Zach Johnson	RSo
S	39	Charlie Eckhardt	RFr
OLB	40	Mickey Vaccarello	Fr
DL	42	Jacobi Murray	RFr
ILB	43	Landon McComber	Fr
OLB	44	Ernest Cooper	RJr
DL	45	Omar Staples	RSo
OLB	46	Carter Davis	Fr
OLB	48	Drew Cunningham	RFr
OLB	49	Gabe Kaminski	Fr
ILB	54	Preston Jernegan	RFr
DL	55	Joe Asiain	RFr
DT	57	Kole Briehler	Fr
DL	58	Brendan Delaney	RFr
DL	75	Braden Marceau-Olayinka	RSo
OLB	88	Keyshaun Eleazer	Fr
RSO	90	Gavin Geweniger	RSo
DE	95	Adam Shovlin	Fr
DL	96	Connor Bachhuber	RFr
DL	97	Zach Rowell	RJr
DL	99	Benedict Umeh	RFr

Special teams

Pos.	#	Name	Class
K	13	Emmet Kenney	GS
ATH	14	Dre Pollard	Fr
K	19	London Bironas	Fr
P	37	Aidan Flintoft	Jr
LS	47	Alejandro Chavez	RJr
K	92	AJ Seidler	RFr
LS	93	Peyton Warford	RJr

Head coach

- Tavita Pritchard

Coordinators/assistant coaches

- Terry Heffernan - Offensive coordinator
- Brian Lindgren - Quarterbacks/passing game coordinator
- Malcolm Agnew - Running backs
- Brian Bratton - Wide receivers
- Nate Byham – Tight ends
- Keli'i Kekuewa - Offensive line
- Kris Richard - Defensive coordinator/defensive backs
- Jamey Mosley - Defensive line
- Andy Thompson - Inside linebackers
- Kodi Whitfield - Safeties
- Cory Robinson - Cornerbacks/defensive passing game coordinator
- Nate Kaczor - Special teams coordinator

Legend

- (C) Team captain
- (S) Suspended
- (I) Ineligible
- Injured
- Redshirt

Roster
Last update: June 14, 2026
