= Tae Johnson =

Tae Johnson may refer to:

- Brauntae Johnson, American football safety
- Tae Johnson (government official), American law enforcement official
