= Joey O'Brien (American football) =

American college football player

No. 20 – Notre Dame Fighting Irish
- Position: Safety
- Class: Freshman

Personal information
- Listed height: 6 ft 5 in (1.96 m)
- Listed weight: 200 lb (91 kg)

Career information
- High school: La Salle College (Wyndmoor, Pennsylvania)
- College: Notre Dame (2026–present)
- Stats at ESPN

Joseph O'Brien is an American college football safety for the Notre Dame Fighting Irish.

== Early life ==
O'Brien attended La Salle College High School in Wyndmoor, Pennsylvania. He was named the MVP of the Philadelphia Catholic League's Red Division (large school) and first-team All-State at wide receiver as a junior after catching 68 passes for 1,029 yards and 12 touchdowns on offense and recording 36 tackles, 13 passes broken up, and an interception on defense. After the season, O'Brien was the Philadelphia Eagles' selection for the Nike Next Ones training camp at the Caesars Superdome in the week before Super Bowl LIX. He was also named second-team All-Catholic League in basketball as a junior. O'Brien was selected to play in the 2026 All-American Bowl. He was named the Pennsylvania Gatorade Player of the Year as a senior after finishing the year with 86 receptions for 1,247 yards and 18 touchdowns and 49 tackles with four interceptions and 11 passes broken up on defense as the Explorers won the PIAA 6A state championship.

O'Brien was rated a five-star recruit by 247Sports.com and a high four-star recruit by all other major recruiting services. He was also the consensus top recruit in Pennsylvania for the 2026 recruiting class. O'Brien committed to play college football at Notre Dame after considering offers from Clemson, Oregon, and Penn State.

== College career ==
O'Brien joined the Notre Dame Fighting Irish as an early enrollee in January 2026.

=== Statistics ===
Year	Team	GP	Tackles				Interceptions				Fumbles		
Year	Team	GP	Total	Solo	Ast	Sack	PD	Int	Yds	TD	FF	FR	TD
2026	Notre Dame	3	3	0	3	0.0	0	0	0	0	0	0	0
Career		3	3	0	3	0.0	0	0	0	0	0	0	0

== Personal life ==
O'Brien's parents both were athletes at Cumberland University. His mother, Tishara, played volleyball and basketball and his father, Joe, played baseball and football. O'Brien's oldest sister, Taylor, played college basketball at Bucknell and Florida State and his other sister, Jordan, ran track at Saint Joseph's and Florida Atlantic.
