= Rodney Dunham =

American football player (born 2008)

No. 44 – Notre Dame Fighting Irish
- Position: Defensive end
- Class: Freshman

Personal information
- Born: July 14, 2008 (age 18)
- Listed height: 6 ft 4 in (1.93 m)
- Listed weight: 242 lb (110 kg)

Career information
- High school: Myers Park (Charlotte, North Carolina)
- College: Notre Dame (2026–present)
- Stats at ESPN

Rodney Dunham (born July 14, 2008) is an American college football defensive end for the Notre Dame Fighting Irish.

== Early life ==
Dunham attended Myers Park High School in Charlotte, North Carolina. He had 55 tackles with seven sacks as a sophomore and 39 tackles with five sacks his junior year. A five-star recruit, Dunham committed to the University of Notre Dame to play college football. He officially signed in December 2025. Dunham also played baseball in high school as a pitcher and outfielder.

== College statistics ==
| Year | Team | GP | Tackles | | | | Interceptions | | | | Fumbles | | |
| Year | Team | GP | Total | Solo | Ast | Sack | PD | Int | Yds | TD | FF | FR | TD |
|---|---|---|---|---|---|---|---|---|---|---|---|---|---|
| 2026 | Notre Dame | 3 | 4 | 2 | 2 | 0.0 | 1 | 0 | 0 | 0 | 0 | 1 | 0 |
| Career | | 3 | 4 | 2 | 2 | 0.0 | 1 | 0 | 0 | 0 | 0 | 1 | 0 |
