= Keon Keeley =

American football player (born c.2005)

No. 11 – Notre Dame Fighting Irish
- Position: Defensive end
- Class: Senior

Personal information
- Born: c. 2005 (age 20–21)
- Listed height: 6 ft 5 in (1.96 m)
- Listed weight: 275 lb (125 kg)

Career information
- High school: Berkeley Prep (Tampa, Florida)
- College: Alabama (2023–2025); Notre Dame (2026–present)
- Stats at ESPN

Keon Keeley (born c. 2005) is an American college football defensive end for the Notre Dame Fighting Irish. He previously played for Alabama Crimson Tide.

== Early life ==
Keeley's mother, Janicke, is an immigrant from Norway, leading Keeley to proclaim himself "half Viking." He attended Berkeley Preparatory School in Tampa, Florida. He was rated by On3.com as the No. 2 overall prospect in the 2023 college football recruiting class with a 99.35 rating. Rivals.com rated him as the No. 5 recruit nationally. He was also rated as the top pass rusher in the 2023 college football recruiting class. He received scholarship offers from numerous schools, including Alabama, Notre Dame, Ohio State, Florida State, Georgia, and Michigan.

== College career ==
Keeley committed to Alabama in December 2022. He started off by not playing his true freshman year, but the next year, Keeley only appeared in five games in his redshirt freshman season. In his third year with the Crimson Tide, Keeley, now a redshirt sophomore, appeared in 13 games with 16 total tackles, and 3 sacks.

In January 2026, Keeley decided to transfer to the University of Notre Dame.

=== Statistics ===
Year	Team	GP	Tackles				Interceptions				Fumbles		
Year	Team	GP	Total	Solo	Ast	Sack	PD	Int	Yds	TD	FF	FR	TD
2023	Alabama	0	Did not play										
2024	Alabama	6	3	0	3	0.0	0	0	0	0	0	0	0
2025	Alabama	13	16	6	10	3.0	1	0	0	0	0	0	0
2026	Notre Dame	3	3	1	2	0.0	0	0	0	0	0	0	0
Career		22	22	7	15	3.0	1	0	0	0	0	0	0
