= Micah Gilbert =

American football wide receiver

No. 14 – Notre Dame Fighting Irish
- Position: Wide receiver
- Class: Junior

Personal information
- Listed height: 6 ft 2 in (1.88 m)
- Listed weight: 205 lb (93 kg)

Career information
- College: Notre Dame (2024–present)
- Stats at ESPN

Micah Gilbert is an American college football wide receiver for the Notre Dame Fighting Irish.

== Early life ==
Gilbert attended Charlotte Christian School in Charlotte, North Carolina, where he played football and basketball. During his high school career he had 2,200 yards and 25 touchdowns. He committed to the University of Notre Dame to play college football.

== College career ==
Gilbert played in three games his first year at Notre Dame in 2024. In 2025, he played in 10 games and had nine receptions for 93 yards and a touchdown. Gilbert earned more playing time in 2026. In the third game of the season against Michigan State, he had eight receptions for 170 yards.

=== Statistics ===
Year	Team	GP	Receiving			
Year	Team	GP	Rec	Yds	Avg	TD
2024	Notre Dame	3	0	0	–	0
2025	Notre Dame	10	9	93	10.3	1
2026	Notre Dame	3	13	251	19.3	1
Career		16	22	344	15.6	2

== Personal life ==
Gilbert's brother is Mark Gilbert, a former NFL cornerback; his uncle is Sean Gilbert, a former Pro Bowl defensive tackle; and his cousin is Darrelle Revis, a Hall of Fame cornerback and Super Bowl champion.
