= Devin Fitzgerald =

American football player

No. 11 – Notre Dame Fighting Irish
- Position: Wide receiver
- Class: Freshman

Personal information
- Listed height: 6 ft 2 in (1.88 m)
- Listed weight: 208 lb (94 kg)

Career information
- High school: Brophy College Prep (Phoenix, Arizona)
- College: Notre Dame (2026–present)
- Stats at ESPN

Devin Fitzgerald is an American college football wide receiver for the Notre Dame Fighting Irish.

== Early life ==
Fitzgerald attended Brophy College Preparatory in Phoenix, Arizona, where he played football and lacrosse. He debuted on the varsity football team during his sophomore year. As a junior, Fitzgerald tallied 52 receptions for 720 yards and nine touchdowns. That offseason, he was named MVP of the 2025 OT7 All-Star Game.

As a senior, Fitzgerald posted 82 receptions for 1,230 yards and 15 touchdowns, which ranked second in school history in single-season receptions, receiving yards, and touchdowns. On September 19, 2025, he recorded 14 catches for 234 yards and three touchdowns in a 70–33 loss to Hamilton High School, breaking the school record for receiving yards in a game. Fitzgerald helped the team advance to the Arizona Interscholastic Association Open Division quarterfinals. In his final high school game, he tallied 14 receptions for 253 yards and four touchdowns in a 45–34 loss to Chandler High School, breaking the school record for single-game receiving touchdowns. (Note: A different source states that his four receiving touchdowns tied the school record.) Fitzgerald was named to the Fiesta Bowl All-State Team and was a nominee for the Arizona Gatorade Player of the Year award. He was also selected to play in the Navy All-American Bowl.

Fitzgerald concluded his high school career with 149 receptions for 2,125 yards and 26 touchdowns, tying the school record for catches and finishing second in career receiving yards and touchdowns.

=== Recruiting ===
Fitzgerald was rated as a four-star recruit by 247Sports and Rivals.com, and a three-star recruit by ESPN. He was ranked as the second-best prospect in the state of Arizona in the class of 2026 by 247Sports. Fitzgerald received more than 50 college offers. He narrowed his choices down to a top four of Clemson, Notre Dame, Stanford, and UCLA. On July 5, 2025, Fitzgerald committed to playing college football at the University of Notre Dame. He signed his National Letter of Intent with the Fighting Irish in December.

== College career ==
Fitzgerald enrolled early at Notre Dame in 2026, joining the Fighting Irish in time for spring practices. He impressed at spring practices, drawing praise from head coach Marcus Freeman for his performances, which he capped by catching a touchdown pass in the Blue & Gold spring game. Fitzgerald continued his good performances into fall camp. Ahead of the 2026 season, he was named to the Hispanic College Football Player of the Year award watchlist.

== Personal life ==
Fitzgerald is the son of Larry Fitzgerald, who played 17 seasons in the National Football League (NFL) with the Arizona Cardinals, and Angie Nazario. He is the oldest of three children. Fitzgerald presented his father for induction into the Pro Football Hall of Fame in August 2026.
