= Berkeley Preparatory School =

Private school in Tampa, Florida, US

Coordinates: 27.9897645°N 82.574744°W

Location
- 4811 Kelly Road; Tampa, Hillsborough County, Florida 33615; United States

Information
- Type: Private
- Motto: "Disciplina, Diligentia, Integritas" ("Discipline, Diligence, Integrity")
- Religious affiliation: Episcopal Church
- Founded: 1960
- Head of School: Augustine Whyte
- Faculty: 268
- Grades: PK–12
- Enrollment: 1401
- Average class size: 18 (upper school)
- Student to teacher ratio: 10:1 (upper school)
- Campus size: 86 acres (35 ha)
- Colors: Navy and Columbia blue
- Nickname: Berkeley
- Accreditation: FCIS
- Website: https://www.berkeleyprep.org/

Berkeley Preparatory School is an independent coeducational college-preparatory day school in Tampa, in Florida in the United States. It is housed in eight buildings on a campus of about 80 acres (32 hectares), and has approximately 1400 students in classes from kindergarten to twelfth grade. It is affiliated to the Episcopal Church, and has either approval or accreditation from the College Board, the Florida Council of Independent Schools, the Florida Department of Education, the National Association of Episcopal Schools and the Southern Association of Independent Schools.

== Alumni ==
- Nelson Agholor, NFL wide receiver for the New England Patriots
- Jeff Balis, film producer and director
- Martin Baron, journalist and editor of The Washington Post and The Boston Globe
- Declan Farmer, paralympic gold medalist and ESPY winner
- Arjun Gupta, actor on The Magicians
- Jaylen Harrell, defensive end for the Michigan Wolverines
- Keon Keeley, linebacker and defensive end for the Alabama Crimson Tide
- Zach Mathis, CFL football player
- Kirstjen Nielsen, United States Secretary of Homeland Security
- Maulik Pancholy, actor, voice of Baljeet on Phineas and Ferb
- Nicholas Petit-Frere, NFL offensive lineman for the Tennessee Titans
- Steve Swindal, businessman
- Justin Vogel, NFL football player
- Joshua Youngblood, college football wide receiver
- Kyle Dagostino, USA Men's Volleyball team
- Jordan Weiss, an American writer, director and producer.
