= Mylan Graham =

American football player

No. 3 – Notre Dame Fighting Irish
- Position: Wide receiver
- Class: Junior

Personal information
- Listed height: 6 ft 1 in (1.85 m)
- Listed weight: 195 lb (88 kg)

Career information
- High school: New Haven (New Haven, Indiana)
- College: Ohio State (2024–2025); Notre Dame (2026–present)

Awards and highlights
- CFP national champion (2024)
- Stats at ESPN

Mylan Graham is an American college football wide receiver for the Notre Dame Fighting Irish. He previously played for the Ohio State Buckeyes.

== Early life ==
Graham is from New Haven, Indiana. He attended New Haven High School where he played football and was a standout wide receiver. As a junior in 2022, he caught 48 passes for 1,149 yards and 13 touchdowns. He then played in seven games as a senior while battling a leg injury, finishing with 39 catches for 566 yards and six touchdowns as New Haven compiled a record of 8–2. He finished his stint at New Haven having caught 112 passes for 2,062 yards and 21 touchdowns. Graham was one of the top prospects in the 2024 college football recruiting class, being ranked a five-star recruit, the top player in Indiana, the seventh-best wide receiver and the 22nd-best player nationally by 247Sports. He committed to play college football for the Ohio State Buckeyes.

== College career ==
Graham joined Ohio State as a summer enrollee in 2024. He redshirted and appeared in four games during the 2024 season, recording no statistics while appearing on 16 plays for the national champion Buckeyes. He impressed at the team's 2025 spring game, recording 104 receiving yards and catching a 49-yard touchdown.

=== Statistics ===
Year	Team	GP	Receiving			
Year	Team	GP	Rec	Yds	Avg	TD
2024	Ohio State	4	0	0	–	0
2025	Ohio State	9	6	93	15.5	0
2026	Notre Dame	3	3	32	10.7	0
Career		16	9	125	13.9	0
