= Badara Traore =

American football player (born 1997)

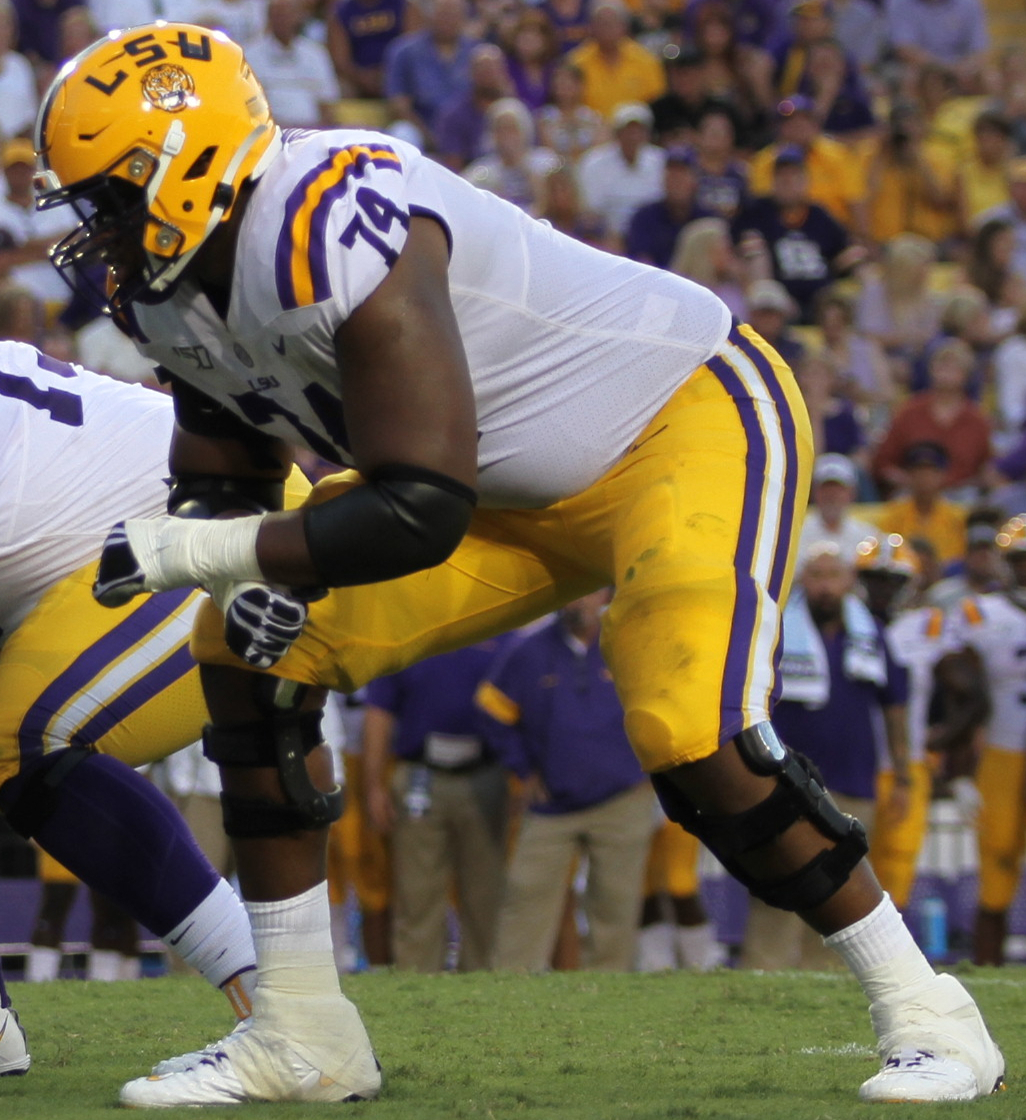
- Traore with the LSU Tigers in 2019

Profile
- Position: Offensive tackle

Personal information
- Born: March 12, 1997 (age 29); Hyde Park, Massachusetts, U.S.
- Listed height: 6 ft 7 in (2.01 m)
- Listed weight: 327 lb (148 kg)

Career information
- High school: Matignon (MA)
- College: LSU
- NFL draft: 2020: undrafted

Career history
- Chicago Bears (2020–2021)*; Jacksonville Jaguars (2021); Arizona Cardinals (2022); Carolina Panthers (2023–2024)*; DC Defenders (2025)*
- * Offseason or practice squad member only

Awards and highlights
- CFP national champion (2019)

Career NFL statistics as of 2023
- Games played: 2
- Stats at Pro Football Reference

Badara Traore (born March 12, 1997) is an American professional football offensive tackle. He played college football at LSU.

== Early life ==
Traore was born to Bakary Traore and Rouguiatou Kaba, both African immigrants, and grew up in Hyde Park, Massachusetts. He attended Matignon High School, where he played on the football and basketball teams and commuted two hours each way.

== College career ==
Traore played two seasons at ASA College in Brooklyn, New York. In 2018, he transferred to Louisiana State University to continue his collegiate football career, turning down offers from 26 schools, including Oklahoma, Auburn, and Texas. In his first season at LSU, he played in all 13 games, starting 2 of them, and was referred to as "one of the most improved players on the team" by head coach Ed Orgeron. Going into his senior year, Traore served as the backup right tackle to Austin Deculus and took snaps on special teams. During his final season at LSU, he played in 13 games and earned 3 starts against Georgia Southern, Ole Miss, and Arkansas (one at left tackle and two at right tackle).

== Professional career ==
Pre-draft measurables
Height	Weight	Arm length	Hand span
6 ft 6 1/2 in (1.99 m)	340 lb (154 kg)	37 1/2 in (0.95 m)	9 7/8 in (0.25 m)
All values from Pro Day

=== Chicago Bears ===
Traore was signed by the Chicago Bears as an undrafted free agent following the 2020 NFL draft on April 25, 2020. He was waived on September 5, 2020, and was signed to the practice squad the following day. On October 10, 2020, Traore was placed on the reserve/COVID-19 list after testing positive for COVID-19. He signed a reserve/futures contract with the Bears on January 11, 2021. On August 24, 2021, he was waived by the Bears.

=== Jacksonville Jaguars ===
On August 25, 2021, Traore was claimed off waivers by the Jacksonville Jaguars. He was waived on August 31, 2021, and re-signed to the practice squad the next day. Traore made his NFL debut on January 9, 2022, against the Indianapolis Colts. He signed a reserve/future contract on January 10, 2022.

On August 29, 2022, Traore was waived by the Jaguars.

=== Arizona Cardinals ===
On September 1, 2022, Traore was signed to the Arizona Cardinals practice squad. On October 29, 2022, he was elevated to the active roster. He signed a reserve/future contract on January 11, 2023. On August 29, 2023, Traore was released by the Cardinals as part of final roster cuts before the start of the 2023 season.

=== Carolina Panthers ===
On December 18, 2023, Traore signed a letter of intent to join the DC Defenders of the XFL for the upcoming 2024 season. The next day, Traore was signed to the Carolina Panthers' practice squad. He signed a reserve/future contract on January 8, 2024. He was waived/injured on August 22.

Traore was waived by the Panthers with an injury settlement on August 22, 2024.

=== DC Defenders ===
On January 23, 2025, Traore signed with the DC Defenders of the United Football League (UFL). He was released on March 20, 2025.

== Personal life ==
Traore graduated from Louisiana State University in 2020 with a bachelor's degree in interdisciplinary studies. He has a younger brother, Boubacar, who played defensive end at Catholic Memorial School in West Roxbury, MA and began playing for Notre Dame in 2023.
