= Jayden Sanders =

American football player (born 2007)

No. 12 – Notre Dame Fighting Irish
- Position: Cornerback
- Class: Sophomore

Personal information
- Born: March 28, 2007 (age 19)
- Listed height: 6 ft 0 in (1.83 m)
- Listed weight: 195 lb (88 kg)

Career information
- High school: Kilgore (Kilgore, Texas)
- College: Michigan (2025); Notre Dame (2026–present)
- Stats at ESPN

Jayden Sanders (born March 28, 2007) is an American college football cornerback for the Notre Dame Fighting Irish. He previously played for the Michigan Wolverines.

== Early life ==
Sanders attended Kilgore High School in Kilgore, Texas. He had 42 tackles with four interceptions his junior year and 27 tackles with three interceptions his senior year. He also added 46 receptions for 750 yards and seven touchdowns on offense his senior year. He committed to the University of Michigan to play college football. Sanders also played basketball in high school and was the District 17-4A Defensive Player of the Year in 2024.

== College career ==
Sanders earned early playing time his freshman year at Michigan in 2025. He played in 13 games with two starts and had 23 tackles. After the season, Sanders entered the transfer portal and committed to the University of Notre Dame. He entered his first season at Notre Dame in 2026 as a backup before becoming a starter after an injury to DJ McKinney.
