= Francis Brewu =

American football player (born 2006)

No. 7 – Notre Dame Fighting Irish
- Position: Defensive tackle
- Class: Junior

Personal information
- Born: January 17, 2006 (age 20)
- Listed height: 6 ft 1 in (1.85 m)
- Listed weight: 285 lb (129 kg)

Career information
- High school: Thomas Worthington (Worthington, Ohio)
- College: Pittsburgh (2024–2025); Notre Dame (2026–present)
- Stats at ESPN

Francis Brewu (born January 17, 2006) is an American college football defensive tackle for the Notre Dame Fighting Irish. He previously played for the Pittsburgh Panthers.

== College career ==
In January 2024, Brewu enrolled early at Pittsburgh. He quickly impressed during spring camp due to his size and technique and was moved off of the scout team. He was also named the strongest player on the team by his teammates. Prior to the 2024 season, Brewu was named number 77 on Bruce Feldman’s Freaks List. During the season he played in 12 games with one start and totaled 15 tackles, three tackles for loss and 1.5 sacks. He was also named to the Pro Football Focus (PFF) All-Freshman Team at the end of the season. In December 2024, Brewu announced he would return to the Panthers for 2025. On August 4, 2025, Brewu was again named to Feldman's Freaks List, this time at number 24. In 2025 Brewu started 12 games for the Panthers in which he led all Pitt interior defensive linemen in tackles. Due to his performance, Brewu gained recognition as an Honorable Mention All-ACC selection. On January 6, 2026, Brewu entered the transfer portal, and chose to transfer to the Notre Dame Fighting Irish on January 13. On August 10, 2026, Brewu was named to Bruce Feldman’s Freaks List for the third consecutive season.

=== Statistics ===
Year	Team	GP	Tackles				Interceptions				Fumbles		
Year	Team	GP	Total	Solo	Ast	Sack	PD	Int	Yds	TD	FF	FR	TD
2024	Pittsburgh	12	15	2	13	1.5	0	0	0	0	0	0	0
2025	Pittsburgh	13	36	18	18	1.0	0	0	0	0	1	0	0
2026	Notre Dame	7	16	9	7	2.0	0	0	0	0	0	0	0
Career		32	67	29	38	4.5	0	0	0	0	1	0	0
