= Hannibal High School (Missouri) =

Location
- 4500 McMasters Avenue; Hannibal, Missouri 63401; United States; 39.7213°N 91.3908°W

Information
- Type: Public
- Established: 1866
- Principal: Ted Sampson
- Teaching staff: 70.60 (FTE)
- Enrollment: 1,050 (2023-2024)
- Student to teacher ratio: 14.87
- Colors: Black and red
- Athletics conference: North Central Missouri Conference
- Team name: Pirates
- Website: Hannibal High School

Hannibal High School is a public high school located in Hannibal, Missouri. HHS serves grades 9 through 12 and is the only high school in Hannibal School District #60.

== History ==
The first public high school in Hannibal was established in 1866. A new building was constructed in 1934; a number of wood doors to classrooms were replaced in late 2018. HVAC units were added in mid 2019.

== Athletics ==
HHS athletic teams are nicknamed the Pirates and compete in the North Central Missouri Conference. The school has won two state championships, taking the 1930 Class B boys track and field title as well as the 1990 Class 3A/4A softball championship. In 2008, HHS acquired turf field material from the St. Louis Rams.

== Performing arts ==
Hannibal has a competitive show choir, "River City Revue".

== Notable alumni ==
- Alexis Bellino, cast member of The Real Housewives of Orange County
- Warren H. Orr, judge on the Supreme Court of Illinois
- Eddie Phillips, major league baseball player.
- Louis Riggs, Missouri House of Representatives
- Lindell Shumake, legislator
- Larry Thompson, lawyer
- Aneyas Williams, college football running back for the Notre Dame Fighting Irish
