= Mark Gilbert (American football) =

American football player (born 1997)

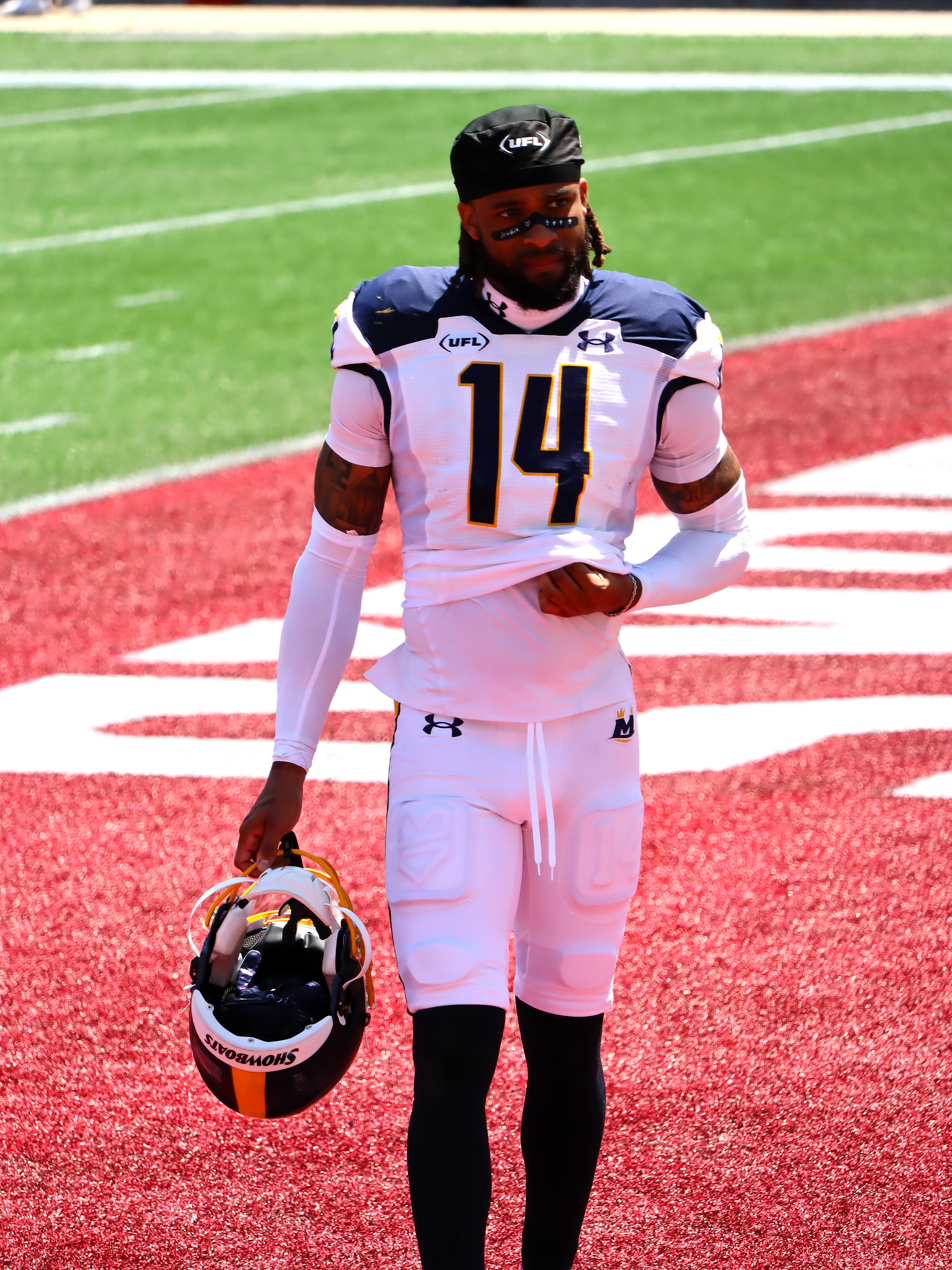
- Gilbert with the Memphis Showboats in 2025

Profile
- Position: Cornerback

Personal information
- Born: June 1, 1997 (age 29); Fayetteville, North Carolina, U.S.
- Listed height: 6 ft 0 in (1.83 m)
- Listed weight: 186 lb (84 kg)

Career information
- High school: Terry Sanford (Fayetteville, North Carolina)
- College: Duke (2016–2020)
- NFL draft: 2021: undrafted

Career history
- Pittsburgh Steelers (2021)*; Detroit Lions (2021); Pittsburgh Steelers (2022)*; Pittsburgh Maulers (2023); Miami Dolphins (2023)*; Birmingham Stallions (2024); Memphis Showboats (2025); Orlando Storm (2026)
- * Offseason or practice squad member only

Awards and highlights
- UFL champion (2024); All-USFL Team (2023); USFL interceptions leader (2023)

Career NFL statistics
- Total tackles: 3
- Pass deflections: 1
- Forced fumbles: 1
- Stats at Pro Football Reference

Mark Gilbert Jr. (born June 1, 1997) is an American professional football cornerback. He played college football at Duke and was signed as an undrafted free agent by the Pittsburgh Steelers in 2021. Gilbert has also been a member of the Detroit Lions, Pittsburgh Maulers, Miami Dolphins, and Birmingham Stallions.

== Early life ==
Mark Gilbert Jr. was born on June 1, 1997, to Tonya and Mark Gilbert. He was raised in Fayetteville, North Carolina. Gilbert attended Terry Sanford High School, where he played football and basketball.

== College career ==
Rated as a three-star recruit coming out of high school, Gilbert chose to attend Duke University. Going into his freshman year, Gilbert was nominated as a second-team all-ACC freshman. He played in 12 games during his freshman year, starting three. In his sophomore year, Gilbert was nominated as a fourth-team All-American before the beginning of the season. Gilbert broke numerous records in his sophomore year, including him becoming the only player in Duke history with 5 or more interceptions and 15 or more passes defended in a single season. In week 2 of his Junior year against Northwestern, Gilbert suffered a season-ending hip injury that caused him to miss the rest of the 2018 college football season, and the entirety of the 2019 college football season. Leading into the 2020 college football season, Gilbert was invited to the NFL combine but opted to remain at Duke. During his fifth year at Duke, he started two games for the Blue Devils before being forced to undergo season-ending surgery on his right foot.

== Professional career ==
Pre-draft measurables
Height	Weight	Arm length	Hand span	Wingspan	40-yard dash	10-yard split	20-yard split	20-yard shuttle	Three-cone drill	Vertical jump	Broad jump	Bench press
6 ft 0 1/8 in (1.83 m)	186 lb (84 kg)	31 1/4 in (0.79 m)	8 3/4 in (0.22 m)	6 ft 4 1/4 in (1.94 m)	4.48 s	1.52 s	2.60 s	4.38 s	7.10 s	36.0 in (0.91 m)	10 ft 10 in (3.30 m)	13 reps
All values from Pro Day

=== Pittsburgh Steelers (first stint) ===
After going undrafted in the 2021 NFL draft, Gilbert was signed as an undrafted free agent by the Pittsburgh Steelers. Gilbert did not make the active roster but was signed to the Steelers' practice squad.

=== Detroit Lions ===
Before Week 8 of the 2021 NFL season, on October 12, 2021, Gilbert was signed off of the Steelers' practice squad by the Detroit Lions. Gilbert was then made a member of the Lions' active roster. He was waived on August 30, 2022.

=== Pittsburgh Steelers (second stint) ===
On October 1, 2022, Gilbert re-signed to the Steelers' practice squad.

=== Pittsburgh Maulers ===
Gilbert signed with the Pittsburgh Maulers of the United States Football League on March 25, 2023. He was released from his contract on August 4, 2023, to sign with an NFL team.

=== Miami Dolphins ===
On August 4, 2023, Gilbert signed with the Miami Dolphins. He was waived/injured nine days later. He reverted to the team's injured reserve list on August 14, and was waived from the list on August 18.

=== Birmingham Stallions ===
On January 19, 2024, Gilbert was signed by the Birmingham Stallions of the United Football League (UFL).

=== Memphis Showboats ===
On January 27, 2025, Gilbert was signed by the Memphis Showboats.

=== Orlando Storm ===
On January 14, 2026, Gilbert was selected by the Orlando Storm in the 2026 UFL draft.

== Coaching career ==
Gilbert signed with Athletes Untapped as a private football coach on November 12, 2024.

== Personal life ==
Gilbert's brother is Micah Gilbert, a wide receiver for Notre Dame. His uncle is Sean Gilbert, a former Pro Bowl defensive tackle, and his cousin is Darrelle Revis, a Hall of Fame cornerback and Super Bowl champion.
