= Adon Shuler =

American football player (born 2005)

- Shuler before the Navy–Notre Dame game in 2026

No. 8 – Notre Dame Fighting Irish
- Position: Safety
- Class: Senior

Personal information
- Born: October 1, 2005 (age 21)
- Listed height: 6 ft 0 in (1.83 m)
- Listed weight: 205 lb (93 kg)

Career information
- High school: Irvington (Irvington, New Jersey)
- College: Notre Dame (2023–present)
- Stats at ESPN

Adon D. Shuler (born October 1, 2005) is an American college football safety for the Notre Dame Fighting Irish.

== Early life ==
Shuler attended Irvington High School in Essex County, New Jersey. As a senior, he earned first-team all-state honors and was chosen to play in the All-American Bowl. Coming out of high school, Shuler was rated as a four-star recruit and committed to play college football for the Notre Dame Fighting Irish over offers from Maryland and Penn State.

== College career ==
As a freshman at the University of Notre Dame in 2023, Shuler notched six tackles. He earned a starting spot in the Fighting Irish's secondary ahead of the 2024 season. In the 2024 season opener, Shuler recorded his first career interception in a win over Texas A&M. In week 8, he returned an interception 36 yards for a touchdown in a win over Georgia Tech. In week 9, Shuler recorded seven tackles in a win over #24 Navy. In week 12, he totaled a career-high eight tackles in a win over Army. In the first round of the 2024 College Football Playoffs, Shuler tallied five tackles and a pass deflection in a win over Indiana. For his performance during the season, he was named a freshman all-American by The Athletic.

=== College statistics ===
Year	Team	GP	Tackles				Interceptions				Fumbles		
Year	Team	GP	Total	Solo	Ast	Sack	PD	Int	Yds	TD	FF	FR	TD
2023	Notre Dame	5	6	4	2	0.0	0	0	0	0	0	0	0
2024	Notre Dame	16	59	36	23	0.0	5	3	94	1	1	1	0
2025	Notre Dame	12	53	30	23	1.0	5	2	46	0	2	0	0
2026	Notre Dame	3	12	8	4	0.0	0	1	9	0	1	0	0
Career		36	130	78	52	1.0	10	6	149	1	4	1	0
