= Boubacar Traore (American football) =

American football player (born 2004)

No. 5 – Notre Dame Fighting Irish
- Position: Defensive end
- Class: Senior

Personal information
- Born: October 24, 2004 (age 22)
- Listed height: 6 ft 5 in (1.96 m)
- Listed weight: 253 lb (115 kg)

Career information
- High school: Catholic Memorial (West Roxbury, Massachusetts)
- College: Notre Dame (2023–present)
- Stats at ESPN

Boubacar Traore (born October 24, 2004) is an American college football defensive end for the Notre Dame Fighting Irish.

== Early life ==
Traore is from Boston, Massachusetts. His brother, Badara, played college football for the LSU Tigers and later was a member of the Arizona Cardinals in the NFL. He attended Catholic Memorial School in West Roxbury, Massachusetts, where he played football as a defensive end and tight end. He grew from 6 feet 2 inches (1.88 m) and 215 pounds (98 kg) to 6 feet 4 inches (1.93 m) and 255 pounds (116 kg) by his junior year, becoming one of Catholic Memorial's top players. A Muslim, some of his games were during Ramadan and thus he played through them without drinking any water. Traore helped his team to state championships in his last two seasons. He was named first-team all-state as a senior and was invited to the All-American Bowl. A four-star recruit and a top-150 recruit nationally, he committed to play college football for the Notre Dame Fighting Irish.

== College career ==
As a true freshman at Notre Dame in 2023, Traore played in five games, totaling one sack and a forced fumble. He became a starter in 2024 after an injury to Jordan Botelho and recorded a 34-yard interception return touchdown against Purdue in the third game of the season. He was the team's leader in sacks (3) and tackles-for-loss (5) before suffering a season-ending knee injury in the fifth game of the season.

=== College statistics ===
Year	Team	GP	Tackles				Interceptions				Fumbles		
Year	Team	GP	Total	Solo	Ast	Sack	PD	Int	Yds	TD	FF	FR	TD
2023	Notre Dame	5	1	1	0	1.0	0	0	0	0	1	0	0
2024	Notre Dame	5	11	8	3	3.0	0	1	34	1	1	0	0
2025	Notre Dame	11	37	23	14	6.5	0	0	0	0	1	0	0
2026	Notre Dame	6	17	15	2	3.5	0	1	18	0	2	1	1
Career		24	54	37	17	12.5	0	1	34	1	4	1	1
