= Jason Onye =

American football player (born 2002)

No. 47 – Notre Dame Fighting Irish
- Position: Defensive tackle
- Class: Sixth year

Personal information
- Born: December 4, 2002 (age 23)
- Listed height: 6 ft 5 in (1.96 m)
- Listed weight: 295 lb (134 kg)

Career information
- High school: Bishop Hendricken (Warwick, Rhode Island)
- College: Notre Dame (2021–present)
- Stats at ESPN

Jason Onye (born December 4, 2002) is an American college football defensive tackle for the Notre Dame Fighting Irish.

== Early life ==
Onye grew up in North Providence, Rhode Island, and attended Bishop Hendricken High School in Warwick, Rhode Island. He committed to play college football for the Notre Dame Fighting Irish over Michigan.

== College career ==
As a freshman in 2021, Onye was redshirted and did not play any games. In the 2022 season, he played one game. In 2023, Onye recorded 17 tackles and two blocked kicks in 13 games played. In 2024, he played in five games before missing the rest of the season due to mental health issues, recording seven tackles, a sack and a half, and a pass deflection. In 2025, Onye appeared in 12 games with nine starts, totaling 26 tackles and a sack and a half.

=== Statistics ===
Year	Team	GP	Tackles				Interceptions				Fumbles		
Year	Team	GP	Total	Solo	Ast	Sack	PD	Int	Yds	TD	FF	FR	TD
2021	Notre Dame	0	Did not play										
2022	Notre Dame	1	2	0	2	0.0	0	0	0	0	0	0	0
2023	Notre Dame	13	17	11	6	0.5	0	0	0	0	0	0	0
2024	Notre Dame	5	7	4	3	1.5	1	0	0	0	0	0	0
2025	Notre Dame	12	26	14	12	1.5	1	0	0	0	0	0	0
2026	Notre Dame	1	1	0	1	0.0	0	0	0	0	0	0	0
Career		32	53	29	24	3.5	2	0	0	0	0	0	0
