= Cambridge Matignon School =

Matignon High School

Location
- 1 Matignon Road; Cambridge, Massachusetts, (Middlesex County) 02140; United States; 42°24′6″N 71°7′53″W

Information
- Type: Private, college-prep, day
- Motto: Efficiamur Christiferi (Let Us Be Christ Bearers)
- Religious affiliation: Roman Catholic
- Established: 1947; 79 years ago
- Closed: June 30, 2023
- Oversight: Archdiocese of Boston
- Head of School: Paul Manuel
- Staff: Greg Salvucci (Asst. Head of School)
- Teaching staff: 35.0 (FTE) (2017–18)
- Grades: 9–12
- Gender: Coeducational
- Enrollment: 426 (2017–18)
- Student to teacher ratio: 12.2:1 (2017–18)
- Campus type: Urban
- Colors: Green & gold
- Fight song: Go Warriors Go!
- Athletics conference: Catholic Central League
- Mascot: Warrior
- Rival: Arlington Catholic High School
- Accreditation: New England Association of Schools and Colleges
- Tuition: $13,500 (2020–21)

Matignon High School (originally Father Matignon High School, later The Cambridge Matignon School) was a private, co-educational Roman Catholic college-preparatory school in Cambridge and Somerville, Massachusetts, United States. The school was under the auspices of the Roman Catholic Archdiocese of Boston.

== Campus ==
The campus fronts on Matignon Road, Cambridge, extending into the city of Somerville at its rear. It consists of two school buildings: the main school building and a smaller alumni building containing development offices and art classrooms. The campus is adjacent to a church and a rectory. This church used to be the Roman Catholic Archdiocese of Boston's Immaculate Conception Church, but reopened in January 2006 as St. Sava Serbian Orthodox Church. The school also resides next to the International School of Boston.

== History ==
Matignon High School was named after Father Francis Anthony Matignon, who was born in Paris on November 10, 1753, and came to the United States after being ordained a priest. He died in 1818. In 1945, the high school was established by Richard Cardinal Cushing (then Archbishop of Boston). The school's 10 ice hockey state championships are second to Catholic Memorial High School in state history. The program has produced 19 NHL draft picks overall; however, its last tournament win was back in 2004.

Matignon High School (then The Cambridge Matignon School) announced it would close at the end of the 2022-2023 academic year because insufficient funding to maintain the school, and financial issues.

The school closed on June 30, 2023.

== Athletics ==
Football League Champions 1950 1954 1957 1958 1963 1981 1989 1990 1994 1997

- Girls' Basketball - League Champions 2006, 2007 & 2018
- Boys Soccer - League Champions 2006, 2007, 2009 & 2011
- Girls Soccer - League Champions 2009 & 2010
- Boys Basketball - State Champions 1989, League Champions 2011 & 2017
- Boys Golf - League Champions 2001, 2011, 2012, 2016, 2022, & 2023
- Boys Baseball - League Champions 2009, 2010 & 2012
- Boys Ice Hockey - State Champions 1975, 1977, 1980, 1981, 1982, 1983, 1984, 1987, 1988, 1993 (Runner up 1976, 1978, 1979, 1989, 1992, 1996) (semi-finalist 1991, 1997), North Finalist (2001, 2003, 2004)

== Notable alumni ==
- Jack Concannon – former NFL player (Philadelphia Eagles, Chicago Bears, Green Bay Packers, Detroit Lions)
- The Most Rev. Robert Deeley – bishop of Roman Catholic Diocese of Portland
- Niko Dimitrakos – former NHL player (San Jose Sharks, Philadelphia Flyers, Ottawa Senators)
- Susan Dynarski – professor of education and economics at Harvard University.
- Bob Emery – NHL Draft pick (Montreal Canadiens) former NCAA player (Boston College), former NCAA head coach (Plattsburgh State) current Director of Men's Ice Hockey Operations (Merrimack)
- William Evans – Commissioner of the Boston Police Department
- Art Graham – former NFL player (New England Patriots)
- Joseph Xavier Grant – United States Army officer and a recipient of the United States military's highest decoration, the Medal of Honor, for his actions in the Vietnam War
- Steve Leach – former NHL player (Washington Capitals, Boston Bruins, St. Louis Blues, Carolina Hurricanes, Ottawa Senators, Phoenix Coyotes, and Pittsburgh Penguins)
- Jimmy LeBlanc – actor
- The Most Rev. Richard Lennon – bishop of the Roman Catholic Diocese of Cleveland
- Shawn McEachern – former NHL player (Boston Bruins, Pittsburgh Penguins, Los Angeles Kings, Ottawa Senators and Atlanta Thrashers) 1996 World Cup winner, Olympian, Stanley Cup Champion
- Tom O'Regan – former NHL player (Pittsburgh Penguins)
- Timothy J. Toomey Jr. – politician (Massachusetts House of Representatives & Cambridge City Councilor)
- Brian Walsh – former professional hockey player with the WHA Calgary Cowboys
- Rick Blangiardi – Current Mayor of Honolulu, Hawaii.
- Badara Traore – NFL Player Arizona Cardinals. 2019 NCAA Football Champion with LSU Tigers.
