= Jackson Gutierrez =

American football player

- Gutierrez throws the ball for Navy in 2026

No. 8 – Navy Midshipmen
- Position: Quarterback
- Class: Junior

Personal information
- Listed height: 6 ft 0 in (1.83 m)
- Listed weight: 207 lb (94 kg)

Career information
- High school: John Jay (San Antonio, Texas)
- College: Navy (2024–present)
- Stats at ESPN

Jackson Gutierrez is an American football quarterback for the Navy Midshipmen.

== Early life ==
Gutierrez attended John Jay High School in San Antonio, Texas. He committed to play college football for the Navy Midshipmen.

== College career ==
As a freshman during the 2024 season, Gutierrez appeared in one game, rushing for 16 yards on five carries. In 2025, he appeared in 10 games as both a quarterback and a fullback, rushing 28 times for 172 yards. In week 1 of the 2026 season, Gutierrez rushed for 31 yards and two touchdowns in a win over Towson. In week 6, he completed five of seven pass attempts for 95 yards and a touchdown, while adding 232 yards and three touchdowns on 41 carries in a win over Tulsa. In week 8, Gutierrez completed 8 of 11 passes for 156 yards and a touchdown, while rushing 26 times for 228 yards and three touchdowns in a loss to North Texas.

=== Statistics ===
Year	Team	Games			Passing								Rushing			
Year	Team	GP	GS	Record	Cmp	Att	Pct	Yds	Y/A	TD	Int	Rtg	Att	Yds	Avg	TD
2024	Navy	1	0	—	0	0	0.0	0	0.0	0	0	0.0	5	16	3.2	0
2025	Navy	10	0	—	0	2	0.0	0	0.0	0	0	0.0	28	172	6.1	0
2026	Navy	8	5	1–4	36	71	50.7	717	10.1	7	1	165.3	178	979	5.5	13
Career		19	5	1–4	36	73	49.3	717	9.8	7	1	160.7	211	1,167	5.5	13
