= Micah Ford =

American college football running back

No. 20 – Stanford Cardinal
- Position: Running back
- Class: Junior

Personal information
- Listed height: 6 ft 0 in (1.83 m)
- Listed weight: 225 lb (102 kg)

Career information
- High school: Toms River North (Toms River, New Jersey)
- College: Stanford (2024–present)

Micah Ford is an American college football running back for the Stanford Cardinal.

== Early life ==
Ford is from Toms River, New Jersey. He attended Toms River High School North, where he competed in football, basketball, and track and field. In football, he served as his team's starting quarterback and led them to consecutive state championships as a junior and senior. During his junior year, he threw for 1,203 yards and 17 touchdowns, ran for 2,360 yards and 33 touchdowns, and posted 77 tackles and four interceptions, being named the Gatorade New Jersey Player of the Year.

Ford then threw for 865 yards and 15 touchdowns, ran for 1,700 yards and 14 touchdowns, and recorded 54 tackles and two interceptions as a senior. He was named the NJ.com Player of the Year in his last two years. He concluded his career with 2,434 passing yards and 37 touchdowns, 6,033 rushing yards and 54 rushing touchdowns, and 131 tackles and seven interceptions. Ranked one of the top 15 prospects in the state, Ford committed to play college football for the Stanford Cardinal as a running back.

== College career ==
As a freshman at Stanford in 2024, Ford started seven games and was the team's second-leading rusher, posting 76 rush attempts for 309 yards. His best performance was a 122-yard rushing effort against Clemson that season. In 2025, in the third game of the season, he ran for 157 yards and a touchdown against Boston College and was named Atlantic Coast Conference (ACC) Running Back of the Week. During his sophomore year, Ford ended up running for 643 yards and four touchdowns for the Cardinal while averaging 4.4 yards per rush. He ran for over 100 yards on three occasions during the 2025 season. Ford returned in 2026 as Stanford's top running back after the transfer of Cole Tabb. In the seventh game of the 2026 season, against Elon, he ran for 179 yards and had 52 receiving yards while posting four rushing touchdowns, tying the Cardinal single-game record.
