= CJ Carr =

American football player (born 2005)

- Carr with the Notre Dame Fighting Irish in 2026

No. 13 – Notre Dame Fighting Irish
- Position: Quarterback
- Class: Junior

Personal information
- Born: May 26, 2005 (age 21)
- Listed height: 6 ft 2 in (1.88 m)
- Listed weight: 215 lb (98 kg)

Career information
- High school: Saline (Saline, Michigan)
- College: Notre Dame (2024–present)

Career statistics as of Week 12, 2026
- Passing attempts: 486
- Passing completions: 324
- Completion percentage: 66.7%
- TD–INT: 48–8
- Passing yards: 4,380
- Passer efficiency: 166.7
- Rushing yards: 115
- Rushing touchdowns: 6
- Stats at ESPN

Curtis Jason Carr (born May 26, 2005) is an American college football quarterback for the Notre Dame Fighting Irish.

== Early life ==
Carr attended Saline High School in Saline, Michigan. He passed for 2,696 yards with 28 touchdowns as a sophomore, 2,685 yards with 26 touchdowns as a junior and 2,754 yards and 24 touchdowns as a senior. Carr played in the 2024 All-American Bowl. A four star recruit, he committed to the University of Notre Dame to play college football.

== College career ==
Carr enrolled at Notre Dame in 2023 and is a philosophy major in the College of Arts and Letters. In his first season in 2024, he was the fourth-string quarterback behind Riley Leonard. He played in just one game and took a redshirt. In 2025, with Leonard drafted into the NFL and backup Steve Angeli transferring, Carr competed for and won the starting quarterback job over Kenny Minchey.

=== Statistics ===
Season	Team	Games			Passing								Rushing			
Season	Team	GP	GS	Record	Cmp	Att	Pct	Yds	Y/A	TD	Int	Rtg	Att	Yds	Avg	TD
2024	Notre Dame	1	0	Redshirted (redshirt)												
2025	Notre Dame	12	12	10–2	195	293	66.6	2,741	9.4	24	6	168.1	41	33	0.8	3
2026	Notre Dame	11	11	10–1	216	319	67.7	2,697	8.5	24	3	162.1	33	87	2.6	3
Career		24	23	20−3	411	612	67.2	5,438	8.9	48	9	164.7	74	120	1.6	6

== Personal life ==
Carr's grandfathers are both members of the College Football Hall of Fame associated with the Michigan Wolverines. His paternal grandfather is former head coach Lloyd Carr, who led the Wolverines from 1995 through 2007. His maternal grandfather, Tom Curtis, was an All-American safety at Michigan in the late 1960s. In addition, Carr's father, Jason, was a backup quarterback at Michigan from 1992 until 1995. Carr's younger brother, Tommy Carr, plays as a quarterback for Michigan.
