= Aneyas Williams =

American football running back (born 2005)

No. 22 – Notre Dame Fighting Irish
- Position: Running back
- Class: Junior

Personal information
- Born: November 22, 2005 (age 20)
- Listed height: 5 ft 10 in (1.78 m)
- Listed weight: 210 lb (95 kg)

Career information
- High school: Hannibal (Hannibal, Missouri)
- College: Notre Dame (2024–present)
- Stats at ESPN

Aneyas Lee Williams (born November 22, 2005) is an American college football running back for the Notre Dame Fighting Irish.

== Early life ==
Williams attended Hannibal High School in Hannibal, Missouri, where he played running back and wide receiver. As a sophomore in 2021, he rushed for 1,001 yards with 20 touchdowns and set school records with 63 receptions for 1,297 yards with 24 touchdowns. As a senior in 2023 he was the Class 4 Offensive Player of the Year, after rushing for 1,415 yards with 26 touchdowns and recording 44 receptions for 815 yards with 17 touchdowns. Williams finished his career with 4,255 rushing yards, 177 receptions for 3,249 yards and 151 total touchdowns. He committed to the University of Notre Dame to play college football.

== College career ==
As a true freshman at Notre Dame in 2024, Williams played behind Jeremiyah Love and Jadarian Price and rushed for 219 yards on 34 carries with two touchdowns and had 18 receptions for 172 yards. He again played behind Love and Price his sophomore year, rushing 24 times for 224 yards and five touchdowns.

=== Statistics ===
Year	Team	GP	Rushing				Receiving			
Year	Team	GP	Att	Yds	Avg	TD	Rec	Yds	Avg	TD
2024	Notre Dame	15	34	219	6.4	2	18	172	9.6	0
2025	Notre Dame	12	24	224	9.3	5	2	40	20.0	0
2026	Notre Dame	3	38	144	3.8	3	3	22	7.3	0
Career		30	96	587	6.1	10	23	234	10.2	0
