= DJ McKinney =

American football player (born 2004)

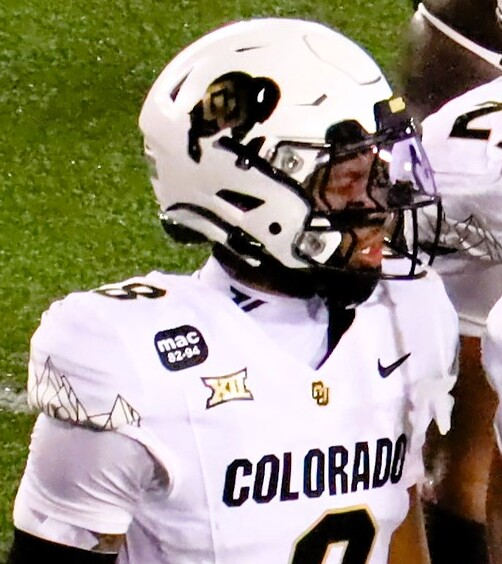
- McKinney in 2025

No. 2 – Notre Dame Fighting Irish
- Position: Cornerback
- Class: Fifth year

Personal information
- Born: February 9, 2004 (age 22); Arlington, Texas, U.S.
- Listed height: 6 ft 1 in (1.85 m)
- Listed weight: 190 lb (86 kg)

Career information
- High school: Colleyville Heritage (Colleyville, Texas)
- College: Oklahoma State (2022–2023); Colorado (2024–2025); Notre Dame (2026–present)
- Stats at ESPN

Dylahn Jordan McKinney (born February 9, 2004) is an American college football cornerback for the Notre Dame Fighting Irish. He previously played for the Oklahoma State Cowboys and Colorado Buffaloes.

== Early life ==
McKinney attended Colleyville Heritage High School in Colleyville, Texas. He had 43 tackles and two interceptions his junior year and 35 tackles and five interceptions as a senior. He committed to Oklahoma State University to play college football.

== College career ==
McKinney played at Oklahoma State in 2022 and 2023. After redshirting his first year in 2022, he played in all 14 games in 2023 and had 38 tackles. After the season, McKinney entered the transfer portal and transferred to the University of Colorado Boulder. In his first year at Colorado in 2024, he started all 13 games and had 62 tackles, three interceptions and one interception returned for a touchdown. McKinney returned in 2025, where he played nine games and had 35 tackles, one interception, and five pass breakups. At the end of the season, McKinney entered the transfer portal and transferred to Notre Dame.

=== Statistics ===
Year	Team	GP	Tackles				Interceptions				Fumbles		
Year	Team	GP	Total	Solo	Ast	Sack	PD	Int	Yds	TD	FF	FR	TD
2022	Oklahoma State	4	2	1	1	0.0	0	0	0	0	0	0	0
2023	Oklahoma State	14	38	24	14	0.0	5	0	0	0	0	0	0
2024	Colorado	13	62	44	18	0.0	9	3	41	1	1	1	0
2025	Colorado	9	35	27	8	0.0	5	1	0	0	0	0	0
2026	Notre Dame	3	1	0	1	0.0	2	1	55	1	0	0	0
Career		43	138	96	42	0.0	21	5	96	2	1	1	0
