= Jerome Bettis Jr. =

American football player

- Bettis Jr. in 2026

No. 8 – Notre Dame Fighting Irish
- Position: Wide receiver
- Class: Sophomore

Personal information
- Listed height: 6 ft 2 in (1.88 m)
- Listed weight: 207 lb (94 kg)

Career information
- High school: Woodward Academy (College Park, Georgia)
- College: Notre Dame (2025–present)
- Stats at ESPN

Jerome Bettis Jr. is an American college football wide receiver for the Notre Dame Fighting Irish.

== Early life ==
Bettis was born to Trameka and Jerome Bettis. His father played for the Los Angeles / St. Louis Rams and the Pittsburgh Steelers and is a member of the Pro Football Hall of Fame. In his youth, Bettis played running back like his father and wore the same No. 36 jersey. However, he switched to wide receiver and changed his jersey number in middle school to "create [his] own legacy and [his] own journey."

Bettis attended Woodward Academy in College Park, Georgia, where he was a standout on the football team. As a junior, he tallied 30 receptions for 369 yards and four touchdowns on offense while recording 34 tackles and two interceptions on defense. As a senior, Bettis posted 36 catches for 630 yards and eight touchdowns to go with 47 tackles, two forced fumbles, and three interceptions (including a pick-six). He also participated in track and field.

Bettis was rated as a consensus three-star recruit. On March 17, 2024, he verbally committed to playing college football at Notre Dame (his father's alma mater) over offers from programs such as Arkansas, Boston College, Cal, Duke, Georgia Tech, Kansas, Missouri, Ole Miss, and Texas A&M. Bettis was reportedly "personally recruited from Day 1" by head coach Marcus Freeman. He officially signed with the Fighting Irish during the early signing period in December.

== College career ==
Bettis enrolled early at Notre Dame in 2025, joining the Fighting Irish in time for spring practices. He played in one game in the 2025 season, recording one catch for six yards against Navy in his collegiate debut. Bettis committed to improving his strength and physicality, saying that "it kind of clicked within me that I've got to make a change" after he was not selected to travel with the team for their season opener at Miami. He entered spring camp in 2026 with a noticeably larger frame, drawing praise from wide receivers coach Mike Brown. Bettis showed promise but was sidelined for most of the second half of spring drills, including the spring game, due to a foot injury. He competed for a backup role throughout fall camp in a crowded wide receiver group. Bettis had two receptions for a team-high 61 yards, including a 56-yard catch, in a 52–0 win over Rice.

== Personal life ==
Bettis has one older sister. An Atlanta native, he grew up as a Notre Dame fan.
