= Allegan High School =

Location
- 1560 M-40 North; Allegan, Michigan 49010; United States; 42°31′48″N 85°52′20″W

Information
- School type: Public High School
- School district: Allegan Public Schools
- NCES District ID: 2602220
- NCES School ID: 260222003966
- Teaching staff: 27.37 (FTE)
- Grades: 9-12
- Enrollment: 543 (2024-2025)
- Student to teacher ratio: 19.84
- Schedule type: Trimesters
- Colors: Orange and Black
- Athletics conference: Wolverine Conference
- Nickname: Tigers
- Feeder schools: L.E. White Middle School
- Website: Allegan High School

Allegan High School is a public high school in Allegan, Michigan.

== Athletics ==
Allegan is a member of the Wolverine Conference. The school mascot is the Tiger and the school colors are orange and black. The following MHSAA sanctioned sports are offered:

- Baseball (boys)
- Basketball (girls & boys)
- Bowling (girls & boys)
- Competitive cheerleading (girls)
- Cross country (girls & boys)
- Football (boys)
- Golf (girls & boys)
- Soccer (girls & boys)
- Softball (girls)
- Swim and dive (girls & boys)
- Tennis (girls & boys)
- Track and field (girls & boys)
- Volleyball (girls)
- Wrestling (boys)

== Demographics ==
The demographic breakdown of the 543 students enrolled for the 2024-25 school year was:

- Male - 48.4%
- Female - 51.6%
- Native American/Alaskan - <1%
- Asian/Pacific islander - <1%
- Black - 3.4%
- Hispanic - 9.0%
- White - 91.6%
- Multiracial - 6.3%

In addition, 52.9% of the students were eligible for free or reduced lunch.
