= Nolan James Jr. =

American football player

- James Jr. in 2026

No. 2 – Notre Dame Fighting Irish
- Position: Running back
- Class: Sophomore

Personal information
- Listed height: 5 ft 10 in (1.78 m)
- Listed weight: 215 lb (98 kg)

Career information
- High school: DePaul Catholic (Wayne, New Jersey)
- College: Notre Dame (2025–present)
- Stats at ESPN

Nolan James Jr. is an American college football running back for the Notre Dame Fighting Irish.

== Early life ==
James Jr. was raised in Westwood, New Jersey. He attended Don Bosco Preparatory High School in Ramsey, New Jersey prior to transferring to DePaul Catholic High School in Wayne, New Jersey before his junior year. As a senior in 2024, he was the NJ football offensive player of the year. For his high school career, James Jr. totaled 5,911 all-purpose yards and 45 touchdowns. He originally committed to play college football Boston College before flipping his commitment to the University of Notre Dame.

== College career ==
In his first year at Notre Dame in 2025, James Jr. played in four games and had 14 carries for 37 yards. He earned more playing time to start the 2026 season. He had his first career 100-yard rushing game against Michigan State, rushing 26 times for 121 yards with a touchdown.

=== Statistics ===
Year	Team	GP	Rushing				Receiving			
Year	Team	GP	Att	Yds	Avg	TD	Rec	Yds	Avg	TD
2025	Notre Dame	4	14	37	2.6	0	0	0	–	0
2026	Notre Dame	3	39	169	4.3	3	7	73	10.4	1
Career		7	53	206	3.9	3	7	73	10.4	1

== Personal life ==
His father, Nolan James Sr., played college football at the University of New Haven.
