= Brauntae Johnson =

American football player

No. 9 – Notre Dame Fighting Irish
- Position: Safety
- Class: Junior

Personal information
- Listed height: 6 ft 2 in (1.88 m)
- Listed weight: 200 lb (91 kg)

Career information
- High school: North Side (Fort Wayne, Indiana)
- College: Notre Dame (2024–present)
- Stats at ESPN

Brauntae Ladarries Johnson, formerly known as Tae Johnson, is an American college football safety for the Notre Dame Fighting Irish.

== Early life ==
Johnson attended North Side High School in Fort Wayne, Indiana. He played wide receiver in high school and finished his career with 139 receptions for 2,286 yards and 41 touchdowns. He committed to the University of Notre Dame to play college football. Johnson also played basketball in high school.

== College career ==
In his first year at Notre Dame in 2024, Johnson missed time after undergoing foot surgery prior to the season. He returned from the injury to play in three games and redshirted. He entered his redshirt freshman season in 2025 as a backup before taking over as starting free safety against Arkansas.

=== College statistics ===
Year	Team	GP	Tackles				Interceptions				Fumbles		
Year	Team	GP	Total	Solo	Ast	Sack	PD	Int	Yds	TD	FF	FR	TD
2024	Notre Dame	3	3	3	0	0.0	0	0	0	0	0	0	0
2025	Notre Dame	10	48	35	13	0.0	3	4	73	1	0	0	0
2026	Notre Dame	1	1	1	0	0.0	1	0	0	0	0	0	0
Career		14	52	39	13	0.0	4	4	73	1	0	0	0

== Personal life ==
Johnson has a daughter, Ja'zora, born in March 2025.
