= Jonaz Walton =

American football player

- Walton in 2026

No. 20 – Notre Dame Fighting Irish
- Position: Running back
- Class: Freshman

Personal information
- Listed height: 5 ft 9 in (1.75 m)
- Listed weight: 214 lb (97 kg)

Career information
- High school: Central (Carrollton, Georgia)
- College: Notre Dame (2026–present)
- Stats at ESPN

Jonaz Walton is an American college football running back for the Notre Dame Fighting Irish.

== Early life ==
Walton attended Central High School in Carrollton, Georgia. He was named the Region Offensive Player of the Year in his sophomore and senior years and an AJC Super 11 his senior year. For his high school career he had 5,965 yards and 70 touchdowns. Walton committed to the University of Notre Dame to play college football.

== College career ==
Walton competed for playing time his freshman year at Notre Dame in 2026. In his first career game he rushed eight games for 48 yards.
