= 2021 Oklahoma State Cowboys football team =

American college football season

2021 Oklahoma State Cowboys football

Fiesta Bowl champion

Big 12 Championship Game, L 16–21 vs. Baylor

Fiesta Bowl, W 37–35 vs. Notre Dame
- Conference: Big 12 Conference

Ranking
- Coaches: No. 7
- AP: No. 7
- Record: 12–2 (8–1 Big 12)
- Head coach: Mike Gundy (17th season)
- Offensive coordinator: Kasey Dunn (2nd season)
- Offensive scheme: Spread option
- Defensive coordinator: Jim Knowles (4th season)
- Base defense: 4–2–5
- Home stadium: Boone Pickens Stadium

2021 Big 12 Conference football standings
	Conf.			Overall
Team	W		L	W		L
No. 7 Oklahoma State y	8	–	1	12	–	2
No. 5 Baylor y$	7	–	2	12	–	2
No. 10 Oklahoma	7	–	2	11	–	2
Iowa State	5	–	4	7	–	6
Kansas State	4	–	5	8	–	5
West Virginia	4	–	5	6	–	7
Texas	3	–	6	5	–	7
TCU	3	–	6	5	–	7
Texas Tech	3	–	6	7	–	6
Kansas	1	–	8	2	–	10
Championship: Baylor 21, Oklahoma State 16
$ – Conference champion; y – Championship game participant; Rankings from AP Poll

The 2021 Oklahoma State Cowboys football team represented Oklahoma State University during the 2021 NCAA Division I FBS football season. The Cowboys played their home games at the Boone Pickens Stadium in Stillwater, Oklahoma, and competed in the Big 12 Conference. The team was led by 17th-year head coach Mike Gundy.

== Schedule ==
Date	Time	Opponent	Rank	Site	TV	Result	Attendance
September 4	6:00 p.m.	No. 24 (FCS) Missouri State*		Boone Pickens Stadium; Stillwater, OK	ESPN+	W 23–16	50,807
September 11	11:00 a.m.	Tulsa*		Boone Pickens Stadium; Stillwater, OK (rivalry)	FS1	W 28–23	52,127
September 18	8:00 p.m.	at Boise State*		Albertsons Stadium; Boise, ID	FS1	W 21–20	36,702
September 25	6:00 p.m.	No. 25 Kansas State		Boone Pickens Stadium; Stillwater, OK	ESPN+	W 31–20	51,444
October 2	6:00 p.m.	No. 21 Baylor	No. 19	Boone Pickens Stadium; Stillwater, OK	ESPN2	W 24–14	52,144
October 16	11:00 a.m.	at No. 25 Texas	No. 12	Darrell K Royal–Texas Memorial Stadium; Austin, TX	FOX	W 32–24	99,916
October 23	2:30 p.m.	at Iowa State	No. 8	Jack Trice Stadium; Ames, IA	FOX	L 21–24	61,500
October 30	6:00 p.m.	Kansas^{†}	No. 15	Boone Pickens Stadium; Stillwater, OK	FS1	W 55–3	55,026
November 6	2:30 p.m.	at West Virginia	No. 11	Milan Puskar Stadium; Morgantown, WV	ESPN	W 24–3	50,109
November 13	7:00 p.m.	TCU	No. 10	Boone Pickens Stadium; Stillwater, OK	FOX	W 63–17	54,549
November 20	7:00 p.m.	at Texas Tech	No. 9	Jones AT&T Stadium; Lubbock, TX	FOX	W 23–0	53,169
November 27	6:30 p.m.	No. 10 Oklahoma	No. 7	Boone Pickens Stadium; Stillwater, OK (Bedlam Series)	ABC	W 37–33	54,990
December 4	11:00 a.m.	vs. No. 9 Baylor	No. 5	AT&T Stadium; Arlington, TX (Big 12 Championship Game)	ABC	L 16–21	65,771
January 1, 2022	Noon	vs. No. 5 Notre Dame*	No. 9	State Farm Stadium; Glendale, AZ (Fiesta Bowl)	ESPN	W 37–35	49,550
*Non-conference game; ^{†}Homecoming; Rankings from AP Poll (and CFP Rankings, after November 2) – Released prior to game; All times are in Central time

Schedule source:

== Roster ==
2021 Oklahoma State Cowboys football team roster
Players
Coaches
Offense

Pos.	#	Name	Class
RB	0	L. D. Brown	Sr
WR	1	Tay Martin	Sr
QB	3	Spencer Sanders	Jr
RB	5	Zach Middleton	Fr
QB	6	Ethan Bullock	Sr
RB	7	Jaylen Warren	Sr
WR	8	Braydon Johnson	Sr
WR	9	Matt Polk	Fr
WR	10	Rashod Owens	Fr
QB	12	Gunnar Gundy	Fr
QB	14	Peyton Thompson	So
WR	15	Jonathan Shepherd	Jr
QB	16	Shane Illingworth	So
WR	17	John Paul Richardson	Fr
WR	19	Bryson Green	Fr
RB	20	Dominic Richardson	So
RB	23	Jaden Nixon	Fr
RB	25	Andre Washington	So
RB	26	Asa Osbourn	Fr
RB	27	Dezmon Jackson	Sr
WR	28	Blaine Green	Fr
WR	30	Gabe Simpson	Jr
WR	32	Clayton Barbour	So
WR	36	Vance Hooper	Sr
WR	37	Cale Cabbiness	Fr
WR	39	Peyton Kramer	Fr
TE	40	Colby Blatnik	Fr
TE	47	Luke McEndoo	Fr
TE	48	Silas Barr	Fr
OL	51	Danny Goslevske	Sr
OL	52	Nathan Engles	Sr
OL	56	Jake Henry	Fr
OL	60	Tyrese Williams	Jr
OL	61	Jake Springfield	So
OL	62	Cade Bennett	Fr
OL	65	Hilton Marsh	Fr
OL	66	Joe Michalski	So
OL	67	Cole Birmingham	So
OL	68	Taylor Miterko	So
OL	70	Hunter Woodard	Jr
OL	71	Monroe Mills	Fr
OL	72	Josh Sills	Sr
OL	73	Darian Jones	Fr
OL	74	Preston Wilson	So
OL	75	Eli Russ	So
OL	76	Caleb Etienne	So
OL	77	Hunter Anthony	Jr
OL	79	Logan Nobles	Fr
WR	80	Brennan Presley	So
WR	81	C. J. Tate	Sr
TE	82	Quinton Stewart	Fr
WR	83	Hayden Wiginton	Fr
WR	85	Jaden Bray	Fr
WR	86	Cale Mulsom	Sr
TE	87	Logan Carter	Sr
WR	88	Langston Anderson	So
TE	89	Austin Jarrard	So
TE	90	Braden Cassity	Jr

Defense

Pos.	#	Name	Class
CB	0	Christian Holmes	Sr
S	2	Tanner McCalister	Sr
S	3	Tre Sterling	Sr
CB	4	Korie Black	So
S	5	Kendal Daniels	Fr
CB	6	Jabbar Muhammad	So
CB	8	Cam Smith	Fr
DE	9	Brock Martin	Sr
CB	10	Kale Smith	Fr
LB	11	Lamont Bishop	Jr
S	12	Kanion Williams	Jr
S	13	Thomas Harper	Jr
S	14	Nick Session	Fr
S	15	Ty Williams	Fr
LB	16	Devin Harper	Sr
S	17	Lyrik Rawls	Fr
S	18	Sean Michael Flanagan	Jr
LB	20	Malcolm Rodriguez	Sr
CB	22	DeMarco Jones	So
S	23	Gabe Lemons	Jr
CB	24	Jarrick Bernard-Converse	Sr
S	25	Jason Taylor II	Jr
CB	26	Jordan Reagan	Fr
CB	27	Raymond Gay II	Fr
CB	28	De'Kelvion Beamon	Fr
CB	29	Cole Stanley	Fr
DE	30	Collin Oliver	Fr
S	31	Kolby Harvell-Peel	Sr
CB	32	DeSean Buckner	Fr
S	33	David Johnson	Fr
S	35	Parker Robertson	Fr
DT	35	Samuela Tuihalamaka	Jr
LB	36	Na'Drian Dizadare	So
DE	37	Isreal Isuman-Hundley	So
S	38	Carter Barnard	Fr
LB	38	Mason Cobb	So
S	39	Trey Rucker	Jr
LB	40	Donovan Stephens	Fr
LB	41	Constantino Borrelli	Fr
DT	42	Jayden Jernigan	So
LB	44	Kamryn Farrar	So
LB	45	Jeff Roberson	Fr
LB	46	Nickolas Martin	Fr
DE	47	Jake Schultz	So
LB	48	Adam Martin	Sr
LB	51	Bo Hardy	Fr
DE	52	Ben Kopenski	Jr
LB	53	Tyler Berryhill	Fr
DT	54	Marcus Duckworth	Fr
DT	56	Xavier Ross	So
DE	57	Ryan Baker	Fr
DT	58	Holden Martinson	Fr
DT	70	Jed Wagner	Fr
DT	71	Aden Kelley	Fr
DE	81	Dillon Metcalf	Fr
LB	83	Gordie Geymuller	So
DE	85	Justin Hines	Fr
DE	88	Donnie Wingate	Fr
DE	89	Tyler Lacy	Jr
DE	91	Tyren Irby	Sr
DE	92	Nathan Latu	So
DT	93	Colin Clay	So
DE	94	Trace Ford	Jr
DT	95	Israel Antwine	Sr
DE	96	Koby Walterscheid	So
DT	97	Ian Marshall	Sr
DT	98	Brendon Evers	Sr
DT	99	Sione Asi	Sr

Special teams

Pos.	#	Name	Class
K	19	Alex Hale	Jr
P	29	Tom Hutton	Jr
K	49	Tanner Brown	Sr
LS	53	Matt Hembrough	Sr
LS	57	Cade Davis	Fr
K	59	Brady Pohl	So
LS	63	Zeke Zaragoza	Jr
K	69	Logan Ward	Fr

Head coach

- Mike Gundy

Coordinators/assistant coaches

- Kasey Dunn – Associate head coach/offensive coordinator/wide receivers
- Jim Knowles – Defensive coordinator/linebackers
- Joe Bob Clements – Defensive line
- Charlie Dickey – Offensive line
- Tim Rattay – Quarterbacks
- John Wozniak – Running backs
- Tim Duffie – Cornerbacks
- Jason McEndoo – Tight ends/Cowboy Backs
- Dan Hammerschmidt – Safeties
- Greg Richmond – Defensive line
- Rob Glass – Strength and conditioning
- Bill Clay – Defensive analyst
- Gary Gibbs – Defensive analyst
- Chris Thurmond – Defensive analyst
- Bradley Thomas – Offensive analyst
- M. K. Taylor – Special teams analyst
- Rod Johnson – Director, football operations
- Jon Pickle – Assistant director of football operations
- Todd Bradford – Director, football recruiting
- Mariah Turner – Director, on-campus recruiting
- Beni Tonga – Player development specialist
- Eddie Simpkins – Administrative assistant
- Jordan Burton – Prospect Analyst – LB
- Josh Gonzales – Prospect Analyst – WR
- D. J. Linton – Prospect Analyst – DL
- Joe Reynolds – Prospect Analyst – DB
- Michael Hunter – Graduate assistant
- Lorenzo Joe – Graduate assistant
- Chris Meyers – Graduate assistant
- Zach Sallee – Offensive quality control
- J. W. Walsh – Offensive quality control

Legend

- (C) Team captain
- (S) Suspended
- (I) Ineligible
- Injured
- Redshirt

Roster
Last update: 8/8/22

== Game summaries ==
=== Vs. No. 24 (FCS) Missouri State ===
No.24 Missouri State Bears (0–0) vs. Oklahoma State Cowboys (0–0)

Quarter	1	2	3	4	Total
No. 24 (FCS) Missouri State	0	3	6	7	16
Oklahoma State	6	14	0	3	23

at Boone Pickens Stadium • Stillwater, OK

- Date: Saturday, September 4, 2021
- Game time: 6:00 p.m.CDT
- Game weather: •Sunny Temperature: 87
- Game attendance: 50,807
- Referee: Dan Scanlan
- TV announcers (ESPN+): Courtney Lyle (play-by-play), Brandon Weeden (analyst) & Shane Sparks (sideline)

Game information

First Quarter

- (9:47) OSU – Shane Illingworth 5 yard pass to Tay Martin, Alex Hale XP Failed (Drive: 9 plays, 72 yards, 3:05; OSU 6–0)

Second Quarter

- (11:38) OSU – Jaylen Warren 1 yard rush, Alex Hale Kick (Drive: 9 plays, 66 yards, 3:28; OSU 13–0)
- (10:57) OSU – LD Brown 11 yard rush, Alex Hale Kick (Drive: 2 plays, 25 yards, 0:29; OSU 20–0)
- (1:51) MSU – Jose Pizano 30 yard FG (Drive: 10 plays, 51 yards, 4:23; OSU 20–3)

Third Quarter

- (7:27) MSU – Jose Pizano 48 yard FG (Drive: 6 plays, 12 yards, 1;30; OSU 20–6)
- (1:15) MSU – Jose Pizano 33 yard FG (Drive: 10 plays, 45 yards, 4:11; OSU 20–9)

Fourth Quarter

- (13:05) OSU – Alex Hale 35 yard FG (Drive: 4 plays, −7 yards, 0:49; OSU 23–9)
- (3:06) MSU – Jason Shelly 8 yard pass to Tyrone Scott, Jose Pizano kick (Drive: 11 plays, 84 yards, 4:06; OSU 23–16)

Statistics	MSU	OKST
First downs	22	17
Total yards	334	369
Rushes/yards	37–102	28–54
Passing yards	232	315
Passing: Comp–Att–Int	24–46	22–40–1
Time of possession	36:00	25:00

Team	Category	Player	Statistics
Missouri State	Passing	Jason Shelley	23/44, 223 yards, 1 TD
Missouri State	Rushing	Kevon Latulas	6 carries, 45 yards
Missouri State	Receiving	Xavier Lane	6 receptions, 45 yards
Oklahoma State	Passing	Shane Illingworth	22/40, 315 yards, 1 TD
Oklahoma State	Rushing	LD Brown	15 carries, 30 yards, 1 TD
Oklahoma State	Receiving	Tay Martin	6 receptions, 107 yards, 1 TD

=== vs.Tulsa ===
Tulsa Golden Hurricane (0–1) vs. Oklahoma State Cowboys (1–0)

Quarter	1	2	3	4	Total
Tulsa	0	7	7	9	23
Oklahoma State	0	7	0	21	28

at Boone Pickens Stadium • Stillwater, OK

- Date: Saturday, September 11, 2021
- Game time: 11:00 a.m. CDT
- Game weather: Sunny • Temperature: 84
- Game attendance: 52,127
- Referee: Larry Saunders
- TV announcers (FS1): Cory Provus (play-by-play) & Devin Gardner (analyst)

Game information

Second Quarter

- (04:05) OSU – Spencer Sanders 26 yard pass to Jayden Bray, Alex Hale kick (Drive: 8 plays, 80 yards, 3:08; OSU 7–0)
- (1:44) TUL – Justin Wright 55 yard int, Zack Long kick (Tied 7–7)

Third Quarter

- (5:37) TUL – Deneric Prince 3 yard rush, Zack Long kick (Drive: 7 plays, 80 yards, 2:14; TUL 14–7)

Fourth Quarter

- (14:52) OSU – Spencer Sanders 16 yard pass to Bryson Green, Alex Hale kick (Drive: 13 plays, 76 yards, 5:40; Tied 14–14)
- (10:56) TUL – Zack Long 20 yard FG (Drive: 9 plays, 87 yards, 3:50; TUL 17–14)
- (10:41) OSU – LD Brown 98 KO Return, Alex Hale kick (OSU 21–17)
- (4:59) OSU – Jaylen Warren 11 yard rush, Alex Hale kick (Drive: 7 plays, 72 yards, 2:57; OSU 28–17)
- (3:06) TUL – Anthony Watkins 4 yard rush, 2 point failed (Drive: 7 plays, 75 yards, 1:53; OSU 28–23)

Statistics	TUL	OKST
First downs	18	19
Total yards	347	272
Rushes/yards	39–123	43–99
Passing yards	224	173
Passing: Comp–Att–Int	19–27	15–26–1
Time of possession	32:00	28:00

Team	Category	Player	Statistics
Tulsa	Passing	Davis Brin	19/27, 224 yards
Tulsa	Rushing	Davis Brin	8 carries, 37 yards
Tulsa	Receiving	Deneric Prince	5 receptions, 45 yards
Oklahoma State	Passing	Spencer Sanders	15/26, 173 yards, 2 TD's, 1 INT
Oklahoma State	Rushing	Jaylen Warren	14 carries, 37 yards, 1 TD
Oklahoma State	Receiving	Jaden Bray	4 receptions, 84 yards, 1 TD

=== At Boise State ===
Oklahoma State Cowboys (2–0) vs. Boise State Broncos (1–1)

Quarter	1	2	3	4	Total
Oklahoma State	7	14	0	0	21
Boise State	10	10	0	0	20

at Albertsons Stadium • Boise, ID

- Date: Saturday, September 18, 2021
- Game time: 8:00 p.m. CDT
- Game weather: •CloudyTemperature: 64
- Game attendance: 36,702
- Referee: Tuta Salaam
- TV announcers (FS1): Aaron Goldsmith (play-by-play) & Mark Helfrich (analyst)

Game information

First Quarter

- (8:43) BSU – Jonah Dalmas 40 yard FG (Drive: 12 plays, 52 yards, 4:19; BSU 3–0)
- (5:10) BSU – Hank Bachmeier 28 yard pass to Davis Koetter, Jonah Dalmas kick (Drive: 10 plays, 70 yards, 3:33; BSU 10–0)
- (4:59) OSU – Jaylen Warren 75 yard rush, Alex Hale kick (Drive: 1 play, 75 yards, 0:11; BSU 10–7)

Second Quarter

- (10:07) BSU – Cryus Habibi-Likio 5 yard rush, Jonah Dalmas kick (Drive: 9 plays, 43 yards, 3:22; BSU 17–7)
- (6:26) BSU – Jonah Dalmas 36 yard FG (Drive: 8 plays, 35 yards, 2:32; BSU 20–7)
- (2:10) OSU – Jaylen Warren 6 yard rush, Alex Hale kick (Drive: 10 plays, 75 yards, 4:16; BSU 20–14)
- (0:06) OSU – Spencer Sanders 1 yard rush, Alex Hale kick (Drive: 5 plays, 21 yards, 1:52; OSU 21–20)

Third Quarter

- No Score

Fourth Quarter

- No Score

Statistics	OKST	BSU
First downs	15	19
Total yards	333	303
Rushes/yards	57–246	35–61
Passing yards	87	242
Passing: Comp–Att–Int	6–13	22–35–1
Time of possession	33:00	27:00

Team	Category	Player	Statistics
Oklahoma State	Passing	Spencer Sanders	6/13, 87 yards
Oklahoma State	Rushing	Jaylen Warren	32 carries, 218 yards, 2 TD's
Oklahoma State	Receiving	Rashod Owens	2 receptions, 34 yards
Boise State	Passing	Hank Bachmeier	22/34, 234 yards, 1 TD, 1 INT
Boise State	Rushing	George Holani	12 carries, 28 yards
Boise State	Receiving	Khalil Shakir	8 receptions, 78 yards

=== Vs. No. 25 Kansas State ===
No. 25 Kansas State Wildcats (3–0) vs. Oklahoma State Cowboys (3–0)

Quarter	1	2	3	4	Total
No. 25 Kansas State	10	3	7	0	20
Oklahoma State	21	10	0	0	31

at Boone Pickens Stadium • Stillwater, OK

- Date: Saturday, September 25, 2021
- Game time: 6:00 p.m. CDT
- Game weather: •Sunny Temperature: 86
- Game attendance: 51,444
- Referee: Michael Vandervelde
- TV announcers (ESPN+): Shawn Kenney (play-by-play), Ryan Leaf (analyst) & Shane Sparks (sideline)

Game information

First Quarter

- (8:51) KSU- Taiten Winkel 32 yard FG (Drive: 13 plays, 68 yards, 6:03; KSU 3–0)
- (6:32) OSU – Spencer Sanders 2 yard rush, Alex Hale kick (Drive: 7 plays, 75 yards, 2:19; OSU 7–3)
- (6:18) KSU – Malik Knowles 99 yard ko, Tatien Winkel kick (KSU 10–7)
- (3:26) OSU – Spencer Sanders 20 yard pass to Brennan Presley, Alex Hale kick (Drive: 7 plays, 73 yards, 2:46; OSU 14–10)
- (3:15) OSU – Malcolm Rodriguez fumble TD recovery, Alex Hale kick (OSU 21–10)

Second Quarter

- (10:51) OSU – Spencer Sanders 7 yard pass to Tay Martin, Alex Hale kick (Drive: 11 plays, 90 yards, 4:42; OSU 28–10)
- (4:21) OSU – Alex Hale 20 yard FG (Drive: 11 plays, 88 yards, 4:27; OSU 31–10)
- (0:00) KSU – Taiten Winkel 45 yard FG (Drive: 4 plays, 33 yards, 0:38; OSU 31–13)

Third Quarter

- (1:08) KSU – Jaren Lewis 55 yard pass to Deuce Vaughn, Tatien Winkel kick (Drive: 3 plays, 85 yards, 1:28; OSU 31–20)

Fourth Quarter

- No Score

Statistics	KSU	OKST
First downs	13	25
Total yards	260	481
Rushes/yards	25–62	43–137
Passing yards	198	344
Passing: Comp–Att–Int	14–31–1	22–34
Time of possession	24:40	35:20

Team	Category	Player	Statistics
Kansas State	Passing	Jaren Lewis	10/19, 148 yards, 1 TD, 1 INT
Kansas State	Rushing	Will Howard	3 carries, 28 yards
Kansas State	Receiving	Deuce Vaughn	5 receptions, 73 yards, 1 TD
Oklahoma State	Passing	Spencer Sanders	22/34, 344 yards, 2 TD's
Oklahoma State	Rushing	Jaylen Warren	27 carries, 123 yards
Oklahoma State	Receiving	Tay Martin	9 receptions, 100 yards, 1 TD

=== Vs. No. 21 Baylor ===
No. 21 Baylor Bears (4–0) vs. No. 19 Oklahoma State Cowboys (4–0)

Quarter	1	2	3	4	Total
No. 21 Baylor	0	0	7	7	14
No. 19 Oklahoma State	7	7	0	10	24

at Boone Pickens Stadium • Stillwater, OK

- Date: Saturday, October 2, 2021
- Game time: 6:00 p.m. CDT
- Game weather: •Cloudy Temperature: 78
- Game attendance: 52,144
- Referee: Derek Anderson
- TV announcers (ESPN2): Mark Jones, Robert Griffin III, Quint Kessenich

Game information

First Quarter

- (10:40) OSU – Jaylen Warren 8 yard rush, Tanner Brown kick (Drive: 12 plays, 75 yards, 4:20; OSU 7–0)

Second Quarter

- (0:36) OSU – Spencer Sanders 32 yard pass to Rashod Owens, Tanner Brown kick (Drive: 6 plays, 69 yards, 2:01; OSU 14–0)

Third Quarter

- (3:14) BAY – Abram Smith 55 yard rush, Isaiah Hankins kick (Drive: 4 plays, 63 yards, 1:32; OSU 14–7)

Fourth Quarter

- (14:56) OSU – Tanner Brown 20 yard FG (Drive: 10 plays, 72 yards, 3:18; OSU 17–7)
- (12:04) BAY – Gerry Bohannon 1 yard rush, Isaiah Hankins kick (Drive: 7 plays, 84 yards, 2:44; OSU 17–14)
- (2:10) OSU – Jaylen Warren 4 yard rush, Tanner Brown kick (Drive: 8 plays, 56 yards, 3:22; OSU 24–14)

Statistics	BAY	OKST
First downs	10	24
Total yards	280	401
Rushes/yards	29–107	59–219
Passing yards	137	182
Passing: Comp–Att–Int	13–27	13–23–3
Time of possession	25:33	34:27

Team	Category	Player	Statistics
Baylor	Passing	Gerry Bohanon	13/27, 173 yards
Baylor	Rushing	Abram Smith	10 carries, 97 yards, 1 TD
Baylor	Receiving	Drew Estrada	6 receptions, 88 yards
Oklahoma State	Passing	Spencer Sanders	13/23, 182 yards, 1 TD, 3 INT's
Oklahoma State	Rushing	Jaylen Warren	36 carries, 125 yards, 2 TD's
Oklahoma State	Receiving	Tay Martin	6 receptions, 110 yards.

=== At No. 25 Texas ===
No. 12 Oklahoma State Cowboys (5–0) vs. No. 25 Texas Longhorns (4–2)

Quarter	1	2	3	4	Total
No. 12 Oklahoma State	3	10	3	16	32
No. 25 Texas	10	7	7	0	24

at Darrell K Royal–Texas Memorial Stadium • Austin, TX

- Date: Saturday October 16, 2021
- Game time: 11:00 a.m. CDT
- Game attendance: 99,916
- Referee: Michael Vandervelde
- TV announcers (FOX): Gus Johnson (Play-by-Play), Joel Klatt (analyst), Jenny Taft (sideline)

Game information

First Quarter

- (10:08) TEX – Bijan Robinson 1 yard rush, Cameron Dicker kick (Drive: 11 plays, 75 yards, 4:52; UT 7–0)
- (3:41) OSU – Tanner Brown 21 yard FG (Drive: 10 plays, 61 yards, 3:49; UT 7–3)
- (0:58) TEX – Cameron Dicker 28 yard FG (Drive: 7 plays, 63 yards, 2:37; UT 10–3)

Second Quarter

- (8:36) TEX – Casey Thompson 13 yard pass to Bijan Robinson, Cameron Dicker kick (Drive: 4 plays, 66 yards, 1:59; UT 17–3)
- (5:13) OSU – Jason Taylor II 85 yard TD INT, Tanner Brown kick (UT 17–10)
- (0:08) OSU – Tanner Brown 39 yard FG (Drive: 12 plays, 48 yards, 3:39; UT 17–13)

Third Quarter

- (11:43) TEX – Bijan Robinson 38 yard rush, Cameron Dicker kick (Drive: 5 plays, 80 yards, 2:04; UT 24–13)
- (4:49) OSU – Tanner Brown 21 yard FG (Drive: 9 plays, 43 yards, 3:09; UT 24–16)

Fourth Quarter

- (10:16) OSU – Spencer Sanders 7 yard pass to Brennan Presley, 2 pt conversion failed (Drive: 10 plays, 80 yards, 4:32; UT 24–22)
- (4:37) OSU – Tanner Brown 29 yard FG (Drive: 9 plays, 51 yards, 3:36; OSU 25–24)
- (2:18) OSU – Spencer Sanders 10 yard rush, Tanner Brown kick (Drive: 3 plays, 42 yards, 0:54; OSU 32-24)

Statistics	OKST	TEX
First downs	25	16
Total yards	398	317
Rushes/yards	49–220	33–138
Passing yards	178	179
Passing: Comp–Att–Int	19–33–1	15–27–2
Time of possession	33:43	26:17

Team	Category	Player	Statistics
Oklahoma State	Passing	Spencer Sanders	19/32, 178 yards, 1 TD, 1 INT
Oklahoma State	Rushing	Jaylen Warren	33 carries, 193 yards
Oklahoma State	Receiving	Tay Martin	6 receptions, 48 yards
Texas	Passing	Casey Thompson	15/27, 179 yards, 1 TD, 2 INT's
Texas	Rushing	Bijan Robinson	21 carries, 135 yards, 2 TD's
Texas	Receiving	Xavier Worthy	5 receptions, 28 yards

=== At Iowa State ===
No. 8 Oklahoma State Cowboys (6–0) vs. Iowa State Cyclones (4–2)

Quarter	1	2	3	4	Total
No. 8 Oklahoma State	7	7	0	7	21
Iowa State	0	7	10	7	24

at Jack Trice Stadium • Ames, IA

- Date: Saturday, October 23, 2021
- Game time: 2:30 p.m. CDT
- Game weather: • Sunny Temperature: 53
- Game attendance: 61,500
- Referee: Kevin Mar
- TV announcers (FOX): Aaron Goldsmith (play-by-play) & Brock Huard (analyst)

Game information

First Quarter

- (5:55) OSU – Spencer Sanders 5 yard pass to Brennan Presley, Tanner Brown kick (Drive: 6 plays, 48 yards, 3:14; OSU 7–0)

Second Quarter

- (4:39) ISU – Brock Purdy 1 yard pass to Xavier Hutchinson, Andrew Mevis kick (Drive: 15 plays, 67 yards, 9:35; Tied 7–7)
- (0:59) OSU – Spencer Sanders 42 yard pass to Brennan Presley, Tanner Brown kick (Drive: 4 plays, 72 yards, 0:46; OSU 14–7)

Third Quarter

- (10:21) ISU- Brock Purdy 9 yard pass to Xavier Hutchinson, Connor Assalley kick (Drive: 6 plays, 87 yards, 2:41; Tied 14–14)
- (2:41) ISU – Andrew Mevis 29 yard FG (Drive: 9 plays, 68 yards, 4:07; ISU 17–14)

Fourth Quarter

- (8:36) OSU – Spencer Sanders 25 yard pass to Tay Martin, Tanner Brown kick (Drive: 5 plays, 58 yards, 2:05; OSU 21–17)
- (5:29) ISU – Breece Hall 4 yard rush, Andrew Mevis kick (Drive: 6 plays, 85 yards, 3:01; ISU 24–21)

Statistics	OKST	ISU
First downs	16	18
Total yards	332	374
Rushes/yards	32–107	33–67
Passing yards	225	307
Passing: Comp–Att–Int	15–24	27–33
Time of possession	25:49	34:11

Team	Category	Player	Statistics
Oklahoma State	Passing	Spencer Sanders	15/24, 225 yards, 3 TD
Oklahoma State	Rushing	Jaylen Warren	18 carries, 76 yards,
Oklahoma State	Receiving	Brennan Presley	6 receptions, 84 yards, TD's
Iowa State	Passing	Brock Purdy	27/33, 307 yards, 2 TD's
Iowa State	Rushing	Breece Hall	21 carries, 70 yards, 1 TD
Iowa State	Receiving	Xavier Hutchinson	12 receptions 125 yards, 2 TD's

=== Vs. Kansas ===
Kansas Jayhawks (1–6) vs. No. 15 Oklahoma State Cowboys (6–1)

Quarter	1	2	3	4	Total
Kansas	0	0	3	0	3
No. 15 Oklahoma State	17	21	7	10	55

at Boone Pickens Stadium • Stillwater, OK

- Date: Saturday, October 30, 2021
- Game time: 6:00 p.m. CDT
- Game weather: •Sunny Temperature: 71
- Game attendance: 55,026
- Referee: Brandon Cruse
- TV announcers (FS1): Tim Brando (play-by-play), Spencer Tillman (analyst)

Game information

First Quarter

- (5:49) OSU – Spencer Sanders 4 yard rush, Tanner Brown kick (Drive: 8 plays, 68 yards, 2:30; OSU 7–0)
- (3:37) OSU – Tanner Brown 49 yard FG (Drive: 4 plays, 5 yards, 2:05; OSU 10–0)
- (0:27) OSU – Spencer Sanders 4 yard pass to Brennan Presley, Tanner Brown kick (Drive: 4 plays, 19 yards, 1:30; OSU 17–0)

Second Quarter

- (11:42) OSU – Spencer Sanders 36 yard pass to Tay Martin, Tanner Brown kick (Drive: 4 plays, 70 yards, 1:53; OSU 24–0)
- (5:58) OSU – Brennan Presley 14 yard rush, Tanner Brown kick (Drive: 6 plays, 67 yards, 2:00; OSU 31–0)
- (2:23) OSU – Dominic Richardson 5 yard rush, Tanner Brown kick (Drive: 5 plays, 34 yards, 1:13; OSU 38–0)

Third Quarter

- (11:15) OSU – Shane Illingworth 12 yard pass to Bryson Green, Tanner Brown kick (Drive: 9 plays, 75 yards, 3:45; OSU 45–0)
- (3:50) KU – Jacob Brocila 45 yard FG (Drive: 12 plays, 48 yards, 7:25; OSU 45–3)

Fourth Quarter

- (14:28) OSU – Shane Illingworth 2 yard pass to John Paul Richardson, Tanner Brown kick (Drive: 10 plays, 82 yards, 4:16; OSU 52–3)
- (10:54) OSU – Alex Hale 26 yard FG (Drive: 4 plays, 4 yards, 1:11; OSU 55–3)

Statistics	KAN	OKST
First downs	7	31
Total yards	143	535
Rushes/yards	33/99	47/292
Passing yards	44	243
Passing: Comp–Att–Int	9–18–3	20–32
Time of possession	28:46	31:14

Team	Category	Player	Statistics
Kansas	Passing	Jason Bean	3/10, 10 yards
Kansas	Rushing	Kendrick Miles	9 carries, 32 yards
Kansas	Receiving	Trevor Kardell	2 receptions, 12 yards
Oklahoma State	Passing	Spencer Sanders	12/19, 157 yards, 2 TD's
Oklahoma State	Rushing	Dominic Richardson	11 carries, 79 yards, 1 TD
Oklahoma State	Receiving	Tay Martin	5 receptions, 84 yards, 1 TD

=== At West Virginia ===
No. 11 Oklahoma State Cowboys (7–1) vs. West Virginia Mountaineers (4–4)

Quarter	1	2	3	4	Total
No. 11 Oklahoma State	0	10	7	7	24
West Virginia	3	0	0	0	3

at Milan Puskar Stadium • Morgantown, WV

- Date: Saturday, November 6, 2021
- Game time: 2:30 p.m. CDT
- Game weather: •Sunny Temperature: 55
- Game attendance: 50,109
- TV announcers (ESPN): Bob Wischusen (play-by-play), Dan Orlovsky (analyst) and Kris Budden (sideline)

Game information

First Quarter

- (9:21) UVU – Casey Legg 30 yard FG (Drive: 11 plays, 64 yards, 5:33; WVU 3–0)

Second Quarter

- (8:32) OSU – Spencer Sanders 6 yard pass to Tay Martin, Tanner Brown kick (Drive: 7 plays, 53 yards, 2:53; OSU 7–3)
- (1:10) OSU – Tanner Brown 34 yard FG (Drive: 11 plays, 53 yards, 4:48; OSU 10–3)

Third Quarter

- (5:30) OSU – Spencer Sanders 12 yard pass to Tay Martin, Tanner Brown kick (Drive: 4 plays, 26 yards, 1:43; OSU 17–3)

Fourth Quarter

- (13:20) OSU – Jaylen Warren 13 yard rush, Tanner Brown kick (Drive: 4 plays, 45 yards, 1:40; OSU 24–3)

Statistics	OKST	WVU
First downs	17	11
Total yards	285	133
Rushes/yards	32/103	33/17
Passing yards	182	116
Passing: Comp–Att–Int	21–31–1	16–24–1
Time of possession	28:52	31:08

Team	Category	Player	Statistics
Oklahoma State	Passing	Spencer Sanders	22/31, 182 yards, 2 TD's, 1 INT
Oklahoma State	Rushing	Jaylen Warren	16 carries, 78 yards, 1 TD
Oklahoma State	Receiving	Tay Martin	7 receptions, 63 yards, 2 TD's
West Virginia	Passing	Jarret Doege	16/24,116 yards, 1 INT
West Virginia	Rushing	Tony Mathis	5 carries, 25 yards
West Virginia	Receiving	Sam James	5 receptions, 46 yards

=== Vs. TCU ===
TCU Horned Frogs (4–5) vs. No. 10 Oklahoma State Cowboys (8–1)

Quarter	1	2	3	4	Total
TCU	3	0	0	14	17
No. 10 Oklahoma State	7	21	14	21	63

at Boone Pickens Stadium • Stillwater, OK

- Date: Saturday, November 13, 2021
- Game time: 7:00 p.m. CST
- Game weather: Cloudy • Temperature: 51
- Game attendance: 54,549
- Referee: Derek Anderson
- TV announcers (FOX): Tim Brando and Spencer Tillman

Game information

First Quarter

- (5:01) OSU – Jalen Warren 1 yard rush, Tanner Brown kick (Drive: 11 plays, 68 yards, 3:16; OSU 7–0)
- (2:03) TCU – Griffin Kell 44 yard FG (Drive: 6 plays, 48 yards, 2:58; OSU 7–3)

Second Quarter

- (14:55) OSU – Jaylen Warren 6 yard rush, Tanner Brown kick (Drive: 7 plays, 69 yards, 2:01; OSU 14–3)
- (5:04) OSU – Jaylen Warren 2 yard rush, Tanner Brown kick (Drive: 13 plays, 84 yards, 5:36; OSU 21–3)
- (1:42) OSU – Spencer Sanders 46 yard pass to Blaine Green, Tanner Brown kick (Drive: 4 plays, 89 yards, 1:03; OSU 28–3)

Third Quarter

- (9:07) OSU – Dezmon Jackson 5 yard rush, Tanner Brown kick (Drive: 10 plays, 63 yards, 3:56; OSU 35–3)
- (3:17) OSU – Dominic Richardson 2 yard rush, Tanner Brown kick (Drive: 10 plays, 78 yards, 4:46; OSU 42–3)

Fourth Quarter

- (13:27) OSU – Dezmon Jackson 1 yard rush, Tanner Brown kick (Drive: 9 plays, 55 yards, 3:42; OSU 49–3)
- (12:37) TCU – Emari Demercado 13 yard rush, Griffin Kell kick (Drive: 2 plays, 75 yards, 0:50; OSU 49–10)
- (11:49) TCU – Colt Ellison 28 yard fumble recovery, kick failed (OSU 49–16)
- (8:32) OSU – Dominic Richardson 20 yard rush, Alex Hale kick (Drive: 6 plays, 75 yards, 3:17; OSU 56–16)
- (5:04) OSU – Jaden Nixon 63 yard rush, Alex Hale kick (Drive: 3 plays, 69 yards, 1:35; OSU 63–16)

Statistics	TCU	OKST
First downs	12	37
Total yards	273	682
Rushes/yards	32/108	63/447
Passing yards	165	235
Passing: Comp–Att–Int	12–21	17–25
Time of possession	24:42	33:02

Team	Category	Player	Statistics
TCU	Passing	Chandler Morris	11/20, 103 yards
TCU	Rushing	Emari Demercado	14 carries, 90 yards, 1 TD
TCU	Receiving	Taye Barber	3 receptions, 74 yards
Oklahoma State	Passing	Spencer Sanders	17/25, 235 yards, 1 TD
Oklahoma State	Rushing	Dominic Richardson	12 carries, 134 yards, 2 TD's
Oklahoma State	Receiving	Brennan Presley	6 receptions, 61 yards

=== At Texas Tech ===
No. 9 Oklahoma State Cowboys (9–1) vs.Texas Tech Red Raiders (6–4)

Quarter	1	2	3	4	Total
No. 9 Oklahoma State	3	10	3	7	23
Texas Tech	0	0	0	0	0

at Jones AT&T Stadium • Lubbock, TX

- Date: Saturday, November 20, 2021
- Game time: 7:00 p.m. CST
- Game weather: • Temperature:
- Game attendance: 53,169
- Referee: David Alvarez
- TV announcers (Fox): Tim Brando (play-by-play) & Spencer Tillman (analyst)

Game information

First Quarter

- (10:02) OSU – Tanner Brown 24 yard FG (Drive: 12 plays, 70 yards, 3:56; OSU 3–0)

Second Quarter

- (10:19) OSU – Tanner Brown 33 yard FG (Drive: 9 plays, 65 yards, 1:53; OSU 6–0)
- (0:26) OSU – Spencer Sanders 14 yard pass to John Richardson Paul, Tanner Brown kick (Drive: 13 plays, 80 yards, 3:52; OSU 13–0)

Third Quarter

- (9:49) OSU – Tanner Brown 19 yard FG (Drive: 6 plays, 23 yards, 2:11; OSU 16–0)

Fourth Quarter

- (14:26) OSU – Spencer Sanders 9 yard rush, Tanner Brown kick (Drive: 9 plays, 75 yards, 4:32; OSU 23–0)

Statistics	OKST	TTU
First downs	27	10
Total yards	427	108
Rushes/yards	48/188	26/25
Passing yards	239	83
Passing: Comp–Att–Int	19–39	10–31
Time of possession	36:58	23:02

Team	Category	Player	Statistics
Oklahoma State	Passing	Spencer Sanders	19/38, 239 yards, 1 TD
Oklahoma State	Rushing	Dominic Richardson	20 carries, 84 yards
Oklahoma State	Receiving	Tay Martin	7 receptions, 130 yards
Texas Tech	Passing	Donovan Smith	9/28, 83 yards
Texas Tech	Rushing	Behren Morton	2 carries, 15 yards
Texas Tech	Receiving	Mason Tharp	3 receptions, 39 yards

=== Vs. No. 10 Oklahoma ===
No. 10 Oklahoma Sooners (10–1) vs. No. 7 Oklahoma State Cowboys (10–1)

Quarter	1	2	3	4	Total
No. 10 Oklahoma	7	17	9	0	33
No. 7 Oklahoma State	14	10	0	13	37

at Boone Pickens Stadium • Stillwater, OK

- Date: Saturday, November 27, 2020
- Game time: 6:30 p.m. CST
- Game weather: • Sunny Temperature: 57
- Game attendance: 54,990
- Referee: Kevin Hassell
- TV announcers (ABC): Chris Fowler (play-by-play), Kirk Herbstreit (analyst) & Holly Rowe (sideline)

Game information

First Quarter

- (10:57) OSU – Spencer Sanders 30 yard pass to Tay Martin, Tanner Brown kick (Drive: 5 plays, 80 yards, 1:29; OSU 7–0)
- (9:08) OKLA – Caleb Williams 11 yard pass to Brian Darby, Gabe Brkic kick (Drive: 5 plays, 75 yards, 1:49; Tied 7–7)
- (7:06) OSU – Tay Martin 4 yard rush, Tanner Brown kick (Drive: 7 plays, 58 yards, 1:44; OSU 14–7)

Second Quarter

- (14:53) OKLA – Caleb Williams 29 yard pass to Austin Stogner, Gabe Brkic kick (Drive: 15 plays, 75 yards, 7:23; Tied 14–14)
- (14:38) OSU – Brennan Presley 100 yard KO Return, Tanner Brown kick (OSU 21–14)
- (11:05) OKLA – Gabe Brkic 24 yard FG (Drive: 8 plays, 77 yards, 3:29; OSU 21–17)
- (6:25) OSU – Tanner Brown 27 yard FG (Drive: 11 plays, 63 yards, 4:35; OSU 24–17)
- (0:37) OKLA – Caleb Williams 10 yard pass to Brayden Willis, Gabe Brkic kick (Drive: 3 plays, 14 yards, 1:28; Tied 24–24)

Third Quarter

- (12:16) OKLA – Safety (OU 26–24)
- (10:36) OKLA – Justin Brolies fumble recovery (Drive: 3 plays, 1 yard, 1:34; OU 33–24)

Fourth Quarter

- (13:52) OSU – Spencer Sanders 37 yard rush, Tanner Brown kick (Drive: 7 plays, 58 yards, 1:08; OU 33–31)
- (8:54) OSU – Jaylen Warren 1 yard rush, PAT Failed (Drive: 3 plays, 5 yards, 0:49; OSU 37–33)

Statistics	OKLA	OKST
First downs	21	21
Total yards	441	354
Rushes/yards	44/189	36/140
Passing yards	252	214
Passing: Comp–Att–Int	20–39	19–30–2
Time of possession	35:41	24:02

Team	Category	Player	Statistics
Oklahoma	Passing	Caleb Williams	20/38, 252 yards, 3 TD's
Oklahoma	Rushing	Kennedy Brooks	22 carries, 139 yards
Oklahoma	Receiving	Jeremiah Hall	4 receptions, 76 yards
Oklahoma State	Passing	Spencer Sanders	19/30, 214 yards, 1 TD, 2 INT's
Oklahoma State	Rushing	Spencer Sanders	16 carries, 93 yards, 1 TD
Oklahoma State	Receiving	Tay Martin	7 receptions, 89 yards, 1 TD

=== 2021 Big XII Championship vs. No. 9 Baylor ===
No. 9 Baylor Bears (10–2) vs. No. 5 Oklahoma State Cowboys (11–1)

Quarter	1	2	3	4	Total
No. 9 Baylor	7	14	0	0	21
No. 5 Oklahoma State	3	3	7	3	16

at AT&T Stadium • Arlington, TX

- Date: Saturday, December 4, 2021
- Game time: 11:00 a.m. CST
- Game weather: indoor
- Referee: Brandon Cruse
- TV announcers (ABC): Sean McDonough (play-by-play), Todd Blackledge (analyst) & Molly McGrath (sideline)

Game information

First Quarter

- (7:52) OSU – Tanner Brown 23 yard FG (Drive: 14 plays, 68 yards, 4:22; OSU 3–0)
- (3:21) BAY – Blake Shapen 2 yard pass to Blake Sims, Isaiah Hankins kick (Drive: 3 plays, 11 yards, 1:27; BU 7–3)

Second Quarter

- (14:54) BAY – Blake Shapen 4 yard pass to Drew Estrada, Isaiah Hankins kick (Drive: 3 plays, 37 yards, 1:54; BU 14–3)
- (5:29) BAY – Blake Shapen 13 yard pass to Tyquan Thornton, Isaiah Hankins kick (Drive: 9 plays, 47 yards, 4:09; BU 21–3)
- (3:34) OSU – Tanner Brown 23 yard FG (Drive: 10 plays, 69 yards, 1:55; BU 21–6)

Third Quarter

- (7:09) OSU – Dominic Richardson 4 yard rush, Tanner Brown kick (Drive: 8 plays, 36 yards, 3:20; BU 21–13)

Fourth Quarter

- (8:17) OSU – Tanner Brown 20 yard FG (Drive: 10 plays, 27 yards, 4:30; BU 21–16)

Statistics	BAY	OKST
First downs	15	26
Total yards	242	333
Rushes/yards	33/62	40/70
Passing yards	180	263
Passing: Comp–Att–Int	23–28	32–47–4
Time of possession	28:37	31:23

Team	Category	Player	Statistics
Baylor	Passing	Blake Shapen	23/28, 180 yards, 3 TD's
Baylor	Rushing	Abram Smith	17 carries, 63 yards
Baylor	Receiving	Tyquan Thornton	6 receptions, 71 yards, 1 TD
Oklahoma State	Passing	Spencer Sanders	31/46, 257 yards, 4 INT's
Oklahoma State	Rushing	Spencer Sanders	13 carries, 33 yards
Oklahoma State	Receiving	Tay Martin	9 receptions, 88 yards

=== Vs. Notre Dame (2022 Fiesta Bowl) ===
No. 9 Oklahoma State Cowboys (11–2) vs. No. 5 Notre Dame Fighting Irish (11–1)

Quarter	1	2	3	4	Total
No. 9 Oklahoma State	7	7	17	6	37
No. 5 Notre Dame	14	14	0	7	35

at State Farm Stadium • Glendale, AZ

- Date: Saturday, January 1, 2022
- Game time: 12:00 p.m. CST
- Game weather: indoor
- Game attendance: 49,950
- Referee: Jerry McGinn
- TV announcers (ESPN): Bob Wischusen (play-by-play), Dan Orlovsky (analyst) and Kris Budden (sideline)

Game information

First Quarter

- (13:21) ND – Jack Coan 29 yard pass to Lorenzo Styles, Jonathan Doerer kick (Drive: 5 plays, 75 yards, 1:39; ND 7–0)
- (7:05) ND – Jack Coan 53 yard pass to Chris Tyree, Jonathan Doerer kick (Drive: 4 plays, 66 yards, 2:08; ND 14–0)
- (1:46) OSU – Spencer Sanders 9 yard pass to Jaden Brown, Tanner Brown kick (Drive: 8 plays, 82 yards, 2:29; ND 14–7)

Second Quarter

- (11:04) ND – Jack Coan 16 yard pass to Michael Mayer, Jonathan Doerer kick (Drive: 10 plays, 78 yards, 3:43; ND 21–7)
- (1:16) ND – Jack Coan 7 yard pass to Michael Mayer, Jonathan Doerer kick (Drive: 11 plays, 84 yards, 4:25; ND 28–7)
- (0:37) OSU – Spencer Sanders 9 yard pass to Tay Martin, Tanner Brown kick (Drive: 4 plays, 75 yards, 0:39; ND 28–14)

Third Quarter

- (10:52) OSU – Spencer Sanders 5 yard pass to Tay Martin, Tanner Brown kick (Drive: 12 plays, 87 yards, 4:04; ND 28–21)
- (2:47) OSU – Spencer Sanders 8 yards pass to Tay Martin, Tanner Brown kick (Drive: 10 plays, 89 yards, 2:22; Tied 28–28)
- (0:06) OSU – Tanner Brown 38 yard FG (Drive: 7 plays, 36 yards, 2:17; OSU 31–28)

Fourth Quarter

- (9:07) OSU – Tanner Brown 41 yard FG (Drive: 7 plays, 37 yards, 2:40; OSU 34–28)
- (2:16) OSU – Tanner Brown 25 yard FG (Drive: 4 plays, 7 yards, 0:22; OSU 37–28)
- (01:05) ND – Jack Coan 25 yard pass to Kevin Austin Jr., Jonathan Doerer kick (Drive: 8 plays, 75 yards, 1:11; OSU 37–35)

Statistics	OKST	ND
First downs	34	27
Total yards	605	551
Rushes/yards	44/234	21/42
Passing yards	371	509
Passing: Comp–Att–Int	34–51	38–68–1
Time of possession	29:06	30:54

Team	Category	Player	Statistics
Oklahoma State	Passing	Spencer Sanders	34/51, 371 yards, 4 TD's
Oklahoma State	Rushing	Spencer Sanders	17 carries, 125 yards
Oklahoma State	Receiving	Brennon Presley	10 receptions, 137 yards
Notre Dame	Passing	Jack Coan	38/68, 509 yards, 5 TD's, 1 INT
Notre Dame	Rushing	Logan Diggs	9 carries, 29 yards
Notre Dame	Receiving	Lorenzo Styles Jr.	8 receptions, 136 yards, 1 TD

== Rankings ==
Ranking movements Legend: ██ Increase in ranking ██ Decrease in ranking RV = Received votes
	Week															
Poll	Pre	1	2	3	4	5	6	7	8	9	10	11	12	13	14	Final
AP	RV	RV	RV	RV	RV	19	12	8	15	11	10	9	7	5	9	7
Coaches	RV	22	23	22	22	18	12	9	15	11	10	9	7	5	9	7
CFP	Not released									11	10	9	7	5	9	Not released
