= 2022 Fiesta Bowl (January) =

Postseason college football bowl game

2022 PlayStation Fiesta Bowl
- CFP New Year's Six; 51st Fiesta Bowl
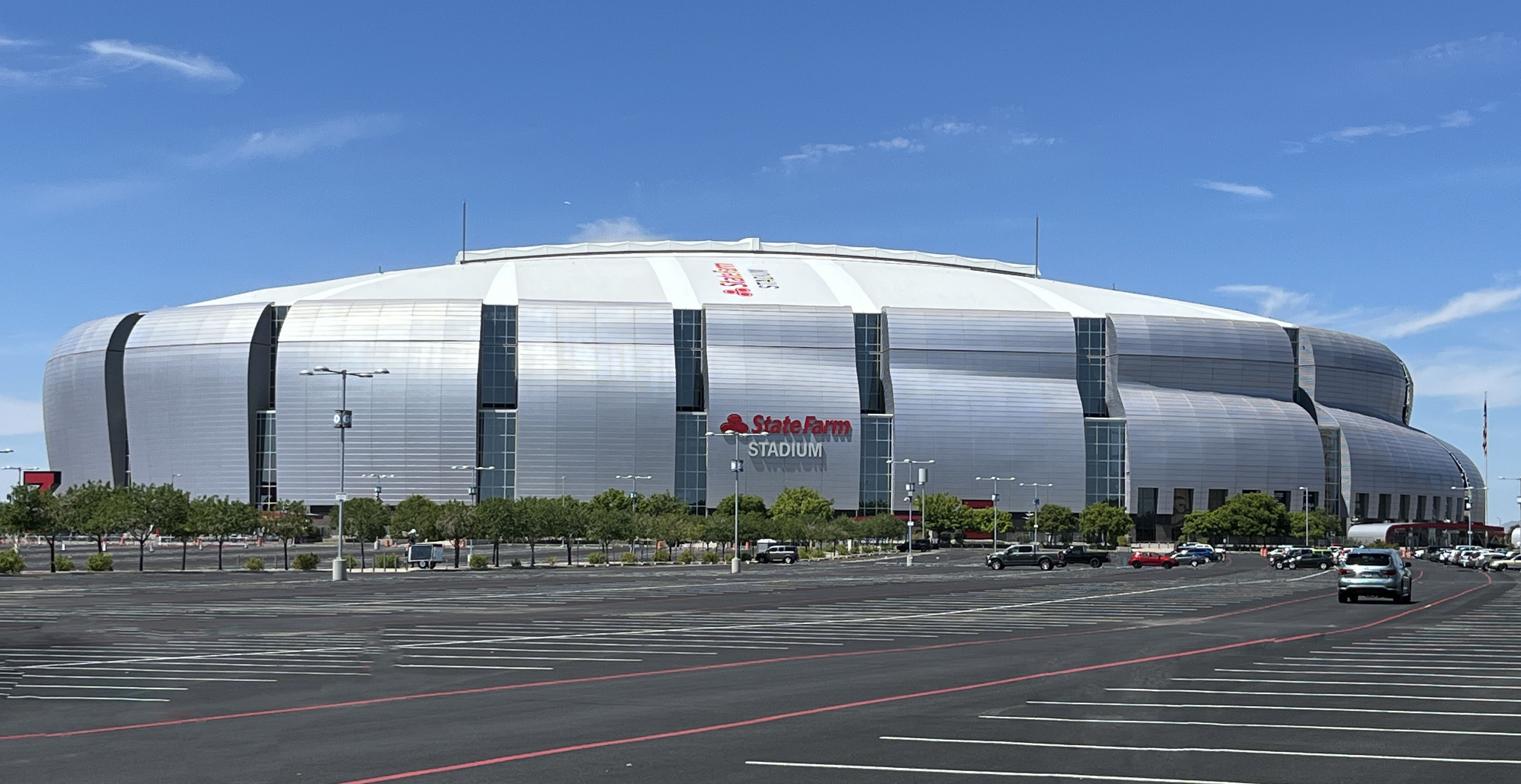
- State Farm Stadium in Glendale, Arizona, hosted the Fiesta Bowl.
| Oklahoma State Cowboys | Notre Dame Fighting Irish |
| (11–2) | (11–1) |
| Big 12 | Independent |
| 37 | 35 |
| Head coach: Mike Gundy | Head coach: Marcus Freeman |
| AP / Coaches / CFP; 9 / 9 / 9 | AP / Coaches / CFP; 5 / 5 / 5 |
| | 1 | 2 | 3 | 4 | Total |
|---|---|---|---|---|---|
| Oklahoma State | 7 | 7 | 17 | 6 | 37 |
| Notre Dame | 14 | 14 | 0 | 7 | 35 |
- Date: January 1, 2022
- Season: 2021
- Stadium: State Farm Stadium
- Location: Glendale, Arizona
- MVP: Spencer Sanders (QB, Oklahoma State) & Malcolm Rodriguez (LB, Oklahoma State)
- Favorite: Notre Dame by 2.5
- Referee: Jerry McGinn (Big 10)
- Attendance: 49,550

United States TV coverage
- Network: ESPN; ESPN Radio
- Announcers: ESPN: Bob Wischusen (play-by-play), Dan Orlovsky (analyst) and Kris Budden (sideline); ESPN Radio: Jason Benetti (play-by-play), Andre Ware (analyst) and Paul Carcaterra (sideline)
- Nielsen ratings: 8.0 million viewers

International TV coverage
- Network: ESPN Brasil
- Announcers: Renan do Couto (play-by-play) and Weinny Eirado (Analyst)

The 2022 Fiesta Bowl was a college football bowl game played on January 1, 2022, with kickoff at 1:00p.m. EST or 11:00 a.m. locally televised on ESPN. It was the 51st edition of the Fiesta Bowl, and was one of the 2021–22 bowl games concluding the 2021 FBS football season. After rallying from a 28–7 deficit late in the 2nd quarter, Oklahoma State defeated Notre Dame 37–35. Sponsored by video game brand PlayStation, the game was officially known as the PlayStation Fiesta Bowl.

== Teams ==
As one of the New Year's Six bowl games, the participants of the game were determined by the College Football Playoff Selection Committee.

This was the first time that Notre Dame and Oklahoma State had ever played each other.

=== Notre Dame Fighting Irish ===
Notre Dame finished their regular season with an 11–1 overall record, losing only to Cincinnati in early October. The Fighting Irish defeated one ranked team, Wisconsin, and entered the Fiesta Bowl ranked fifth in all major polls. After beating Stanford in the last game of the regular season, Brian Kelly left to take the job at LSU and Defensive Coordinator Marcus Freeman was promoted to head coach shortly less than a week later

=== Oklahoma State Cowboys ===
Led by head coach Mike Gundy in his 17th season, Oklahoma State entered the season with a narrow defeat of FCS-ranked Missouri State. They followed up with another narrow comeback win against Tulsa after scoring three touchdowns in the fourth quarter alone, and then took to the road for their first away game against Boise State, which resulted in a one-point win for the Cowboys. They faced their first conference opponent the following week, No. 25 Kansas State, and the Cowboys pulled the upset to move to 4–0 and jump into the rankings at No. 19. Oklahoma State then faced No. 21 Baylor, whom they defeated by ten points, which led into a bye week. The Cowboys then traveled to No. 25 Texas, overcoming an early deficit to win by eight and vault themselves into the top ten, at No. 8. Another road game saw Oklahoma State drop their first game of the year, as they lost to Iowa State by three points. The Cowboys rebounded with a dominant win over Kansas, and held West Virginia to a field goal the following week in a three-touchdown win. They continued on their win streak with another dominant win, this time over TCU, and followed with a shutout win in their final away game of the season against Texas Tech; this victory clinched them a spot in the championship game. The Cowboys ended their regular season with an 8–1 record in Big 12 games, finishing with a four-point home win against No. 10 Oklahoma, their first win in the rivalry series since an overtime victory in 2014. In the Big 12 Championship Game, Oklahoma State lost a rematch against Baylor, 21–16. Oklahoma State entered the Fiesta Bowl with an overall 11–2 record.

== Game summary ==
2022 PlayStation Fiesta Bowl

| Quarter | 1 | 2 | 3 | 4 | Total |
|---|---|---|---|---|---|
| No. 9 Oklahoma State | 7 | 7 | 17 | 6 | 37 |
| No. 5 Notre Dame | 14 | 14 | 0 | 7 | 35 |

at State Farm Stadium • Glendale, Arizona

- Date: Saturday, January 1, 2022
- Game time: 1:00 p.m. EST (11:00 a.m. MST)
- Game attendance: 49,550
- Referee: Jerry McGinn
- TV announcers (ESPN): Bob Wischusen (play-by-play), Dan Orlovsky (analyst) and Kris Budden (sideline)
- Box score

Game information

First quarter

- 13:21 UND – Lorenzo Styles Jr. 29-yard pass from Jack Coan, Jonathan Doerer kick good. Drive: 5 plays, 75 yards, 1:39. Notre Dame 7–0
- 7:05 UND – Chris Tyree 53-yard pass from Jack Coan, Jonathan Doerer kick good. Drive: 4 plays, 66 yards, 2:08. Notre Dame 14–0
- 1:46 OSU – Jaden Bray 9-yard pass from Spencer Sanders, Tanner Brown kick good. Drive: 8 plays, 82 yards, 2:29. Notre Dame 14–7

Second quarter

- 11:04 UND – Michael Mayer 16-yard pass from Jack Coan, Jonathan Doerer kick good. Drive: 10 plays, 78 yards, 3:43. Notre Dame 21–7
- 1:16 UND – Michael Mayer 7-yard pass from Jack Coan, Jonathan Doerer kick good. Drive: 11 plays, 84 yards, 4:25. Notre Dame 28–7
- 0:37 OSU – Tay Martin 9-yard pass from Spencer Sanders, Tanner Brown kick good. Drive: 4 plays, 75 yards, 0:39. Notre Dame 28–14

Third quarter

- 10:52 OSU – Tay Martin 5-yard pass from Spencer Sanders, Tanner Brown kick good. Drive: 12 plays, 87 yards, 4:08. Notre Dame 28–21
- 2:47 OSU – Tay Martin 8-yard pass from Spencer Sanders, Tanner Brown kick good. Drive: 10 plays, 89 yards, 2:22. Tied 28–28
- 0:06 OSU – Tanner Brown 38-yard field goal. Drive: 7 plays, 36 yards, 2:17. Oklahoma State 31–28

Fourth quarter

- 9:07 OSU – Tanner Brown 41-yard field goal. Drive: 7 plays, 37 yards, 2:40. Oklahoma State 34–28
- 2:16 OSU – Tanner Brown 25-yard field goal. Drive: 4 plays, 8 yards, 0:22. Oklahoma State 37–28
- 1:05 UND – Kevin Austin Jr. 25-yard pass from Jack Coan, Jonathan Doerer kick good. Drive: 8 plays, 76 yards, 1:11. Oklahoma State 37–35

=== Statistics ===
| Statistics | OSU | UND |
|---|---|---|
| First downs | 34 | 27 |
| Plays–yards | 95–605 | 89–551 |
| Rushes–yards | 44–234 | 21–42 |
| Passing yards | 371 | 509 |
| Passing: comp–att–int | 34–51–0 | 38–68–1 |
| Turnovers | | |
| Time of possession | 29:06 | 30:54 |

| Team | Category | Player | Statistics |
|---|---|---|---|
| Oklahoma State | Passing | Spencer Sanders | 34/51, 371 yards, 4 TD |
| Oklahoma State | Rushing | Spencer Sanders | 17 carries, 125 yards |
| Oklahoma State | Receiving | Tay Martin | 10 receptions, 104 yards, 3 touchdowns |
| Notre Dame | Passing | Jack Coan | 38/68, 509 yards, 5 TD |
| Notre Dame | Rushing | Logan Diggs | 9 carries, 29 yards |
| Notre Dame | Receiving | Lorenzo Styles Jr. | 8 receptions, 136 yards, 1 touchdown |
