= 2021 Notre Dame Fighting Irish football team =

American college football season

2021 Notre Dame Fighting Irish football

Fiesta Bowl, L 35–37 vs. Oklahoma State
- Conference: Independent

Ranking
- Coaches: No. 9
- AP: No. 8
- Record: 11–2
- Head coach: Brian Kelly (12th season; regular season); Marcus Freeman (bowl game)
- Offensive coordinator: Tommy Rees (2nd season)
- Offensive scheme: Multiple
- Defensive coordinator: Marcus Freeman (1st season)
- Base defense: 3–3–5 or 4–2–5
- Captains: Avery Davis; Kyle Hamilton; Kurt Hinish; Jarrett Patterson; Myron Tagovailoa-Amosa; Drew White; Kyren Williams
- Home stadium: Notre Dame Stadium

Uniform
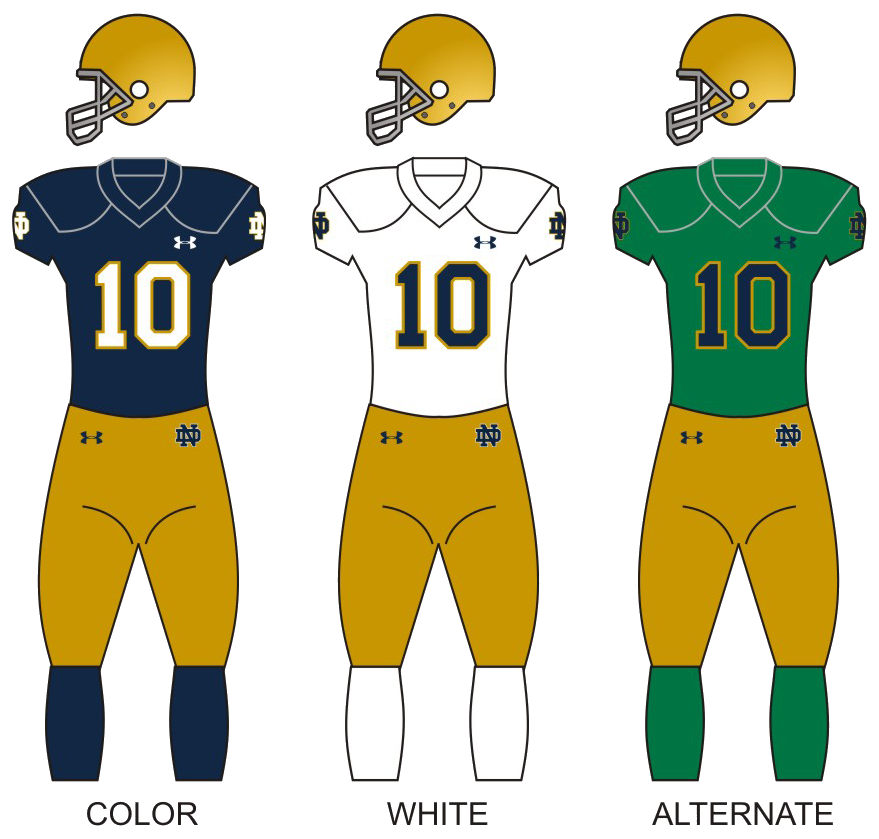

2021 NCAA Division I FBS independents football records
	Conf.			Overall
Team	W		L	W		L
No. 8 Notre Dame		–		11	–	2
No. 19 BYU		–		10	–	3
Army		–		9	–	4
Liberty		–		8	–	5
New Mexico State		–		2	–	10
UMass		–		1	–	11
UConn		–		1	–	11
Rankings from AP Poll

The 2021 Notre Dame Fighting Irish football team was an American football team that represented the University of Notre Dame as an independent during the 2021 NCAA Division I FBS football season. In their 12th year under head coach Brian Kelly, the Irish compiled an 11–2 record, outscored opponents by a total of 458 to 256, and were ranked No. 8 in the final AP poll and No. 9 in the final Coaches Poll. In three games against ranked opponents, they defeated No. 18 Wisconsin and lost to No. 7 Cincinnati, and No. 9 Oklahoma State, the latter in the Fiesta Bowl by a 37–35 score.

At the end of the regular season, Kelly resigned to become the head coach at LSU. Defensive coordinator Marcus Freeman was named the program's new head coach and took over for the bowl game.

The team's statistical leaders included quarterback Jack Coan (3,150 passing yards), running back Kyren Williams (1,002 rushing yards, 104 points scored), wide receiver Kevin Austin Jr. (888 receiving yards), tight end Michael Mayer (71 receptions), and linebacker JD Bertrand (101 total tackles). Safety Kyle Hamilton was a consensus first-team pick on the 2021 All-America college football team.

The team played its home games at Notre Dame Stadium in Notre Dame, Indiana.

== Offseason ==
=== Coaching changes ===
On December 14, 2020, defensive coordinator Clark Lea left the school to become the head coach at Vanderbilt. On January 8, 2021, the school named Cincinnati defensive coordinator Marcus Freeman to replace Lea.

=== Departures ===
NFL

- OL Liam Eichenberg (drafted by the Miami Dolphins)
- OL Aaron Banks (drafted by the San Francisco 49ers)
- LB Jeremiah Owusu-Koramoah (drafted by the Cleveland Browns)
- TE Tommy Tremble (drafted by the Carolina Panthers)
- OL Robert Hainsey (drafted by the Tampa Bay Buccaneers)
- QB Ian Book (drafted by the New Orleans Saints)
- DL Daelin Hayes (drafted by the Baltimore Ravens)
- DL Adetokunbo Ogundeji (drafted by the Atlanta Falcons)
- WR Ben Skowronek (drafted by the Los Angeles Rams)
- S Shaun Crawford (signed by the Las Vegas Raiders)
- OL Tommy Kraemer (signed by the Detroit Lions)
- CB Nick McCloud (signed by the Buffalo Bills)
- WR Javon McKinley (signed by the Detroit Lions)
- TE Brock Wright (signed by the Detroit Lions)

Transfers out

- RB/WR Kendall Abdur-Rahman (transferred to Western Kentucky)
- RB/WR Jafar Armstrong (Transferred to Illinois)
- WR Jay Brunelle (transferred to Yale)
- DT Ja'Mion Franklin (Transferred to Duke)
- OL Dillan Gibbons (transferred to Florida State)
- C Colin Grunhard (Transferred to Kansas)
- LB Jordan Genmark Heath (Transferred to UCLA)
- WR Jordan Johnson (transferred to UCF)
- WR Micah Jones (Transferred to Illinois State)
- LB Jack Lamb (Transferred to Colorado)
- DE Ovie Oghoufo (Transferred to Texas)
- CB Isaiah Rutherford (Transferred to Arizona)
- RB Jahmir Smith (Transferred to Appalachian State)
- DE Kofi Wardlow (Transferred to Charlotte)

Other

- OL Hunter Spears (medically retired from football)

=== Transfers in ===
- QB Jack Coan (transferred from Wisconsin)
- OL Cain Madden (transferred from Marshall)
- LB Adam Shibley (transferred from Michigan)

== Schedule ==
The 2021 schedule was officially released on April 25, 2019. The neutral site game at Soldier Field had been designated the Shamrock Series game, although television rights were owned and operated by the Big Ten Network. This was the second year since 2020 that not every home game aired on NBC, as the home opener aired on Peacock.

Date	Time	Opponent	Rank	Site	TV	Result	Attendance
September 5	7:30 p.m.	at Florida State	No. 9	Doak Campbell Stadium; Tallahassee, FL (rivalry)	ABC	W 41–38 ^{OT}	68,316
September 11	2:30 p.m.	Toledo	No. 8	Notre Dame Stadium; Notre Dame, IN	Peacock	W 32–29	62,009
September 18	2:30 p.m.	Purdue	No. 12	Notre Dame Stadium; Notre Dame, IN (rivalry)	NBC	W 27–13	74,341
September 25	12:00 p.m.	vs. No. 18 Wisconsin	No. 12	Soldier Field; Chicago, IL (Shamrock Series, Big Noon Kickoff, College GameDay)	Fox	W 41–13	59,571
October 2	2:30 p.m.	No. 7 Cincinnati	No. 9	Notre Dame Stadium; Notre Dame, IN	NBC	L 13–24	77,622
October 9	7:30 p.m.	at Virginia Tech	No. 14	Lane Stadium; Blacksburg, VA	ACCN	W 32–29	65,632
October 23	7:30 p.m.	USC	No. 13	Notre Dame Stadium; Notre Dame, IN (rivalry)	NBC	W 31–16	77,622
October 30	7:30 p.m.	North Carolina	No. 11	Notre Dame Stadium; Notre Dame, IN (rivalry)	NBC	W 44–34	71,018
November 6	3:30 p.m.	Navy	No. 10	Notre Dame Stadium; Notre Dame, IN (rivalry)	NBC	W 34–6	77,096
November 13	7:30 p.m.	at Virginia	No. 9	Scott Stadium; Charlottesville, VA	ABC	W 28–3	48,584
November 20	2:30 p.m.	Georgia Tech	No. 8	Notre Dame Stadium; Notre Dame, IN (rivalry)	NBC	W 55–0	70,011
November 27	8:00 p.m.	at Stanford	No. 6	Stanford Stadium; Stanford, CA (rivalry)	Fox	W 45–14	31,571
January 1, 2022	1:00 p.m.	vs. No. 9 Oklahoma State	No. 5	State Farm Stadium; Glendale, AZ (Fiesta Bowl)	ESPN	L 35–37	49,550
Rankings from AP Poll (and CFP Rankings, after November 2) - Released prior to game; All times are in Eastern time

== Rankings ==
Ranking movements Legend: ██ Increase in ranking ██ Decrease in ranking
	Week															
Poll	Pre	1	2	3	4	5	6	7	8	9	10	11	12	13	14	Final
AP	9	8	12	12	9	14	14	13	11	8	7	6	5	6	5	8
Coaches	7	7	10	10	7	13	13	13	11	8	7	6	5	6	5	9
CFP	Not released									10	9	8	6	6	5	Not released

== Personnel ==
2021 Notre Dame Fighting Irish football team roster
Players
Coaches
Offense

Pos.	#	Name	Class
WR	0	Braden Lenzy	Sr
WR	3	Avery Davis (C)	GS
WR	4	Kevin Austin Jr.	Sr
WR	5	Joe Wilkins Jr.	Sr
QB	8	Cole Capen	Sr
QB	10	Drew Pyne	So
QB	11	Ron Powlus III	Fr
QB	12	Tyler Buchner	Fr
WR	16	Deion Colzie	Fr
QB	17	Jack Coan	GS
RB	20	C'Bo Flemister	Sr
WR	21	Lorenzo Styles Jr.	Fr
RB	22	Logan Diggs	Fr
RB	23	Kyren Williams (C)	Jr
RB	24	Audric Estimé	Fr
RB	25	Chris Tyree	So
WR, S	26	Xavier Watts	So
RB	27	Chase Ketterer	So
WR	28	Griffin Eifert	So
WR	29	Matt Salerno	Sr
RB	33	Leo Albano	Sr
RB	33	Sam Assaf	Jr
TE	35	Hakim Sanfo	So
WR	37	Henry Cook	So
TE	39	Andrew Yanoshak	Fr
WR	43	Greg Mailey	GS
OL	50	Rocco Spindler	Fr
OL	52	Zeke Correll	Jr
OL	53	Quinn Murphy	Jr
OL	54	Blake Fisher	Fr
OL	55	Jarrett Patterson (C)	Sr
OL	56	John Dirksen	Sr
OL	62	Cain Madden	GS
OL	64	Max Siegel II	Sr
OL	68	Michael Carmody	So
OL	71	Brennan Wicks	So
OL	72	Caleb Johnson	Fr
OL	73	Andrew Kristofic	Jr
OL	75	Josh Lugg	GS
OL	76	Joe Alt	Fr
OL	77	Quinn Carroll	Jr
OL	78	Pat Coogan	Fr
OL	79	Tosh Baker	So
TE	80	Cane Berrong	Fr
WR	81	Jack Polian	Fr
WR	83	Jayden Thomas	Fr
TE	84	Kevin Bauman	So
TE	85	George Takacs	Sr
WR	86	Conor Ratigan	Jr
TE	87	Michael Mayer	So
TE	88	Mitchell Evans	Fr
TE	89	Charlie Selna	So

Defense

Pos.	#	Name	Class
S	2	DJ Brown	Sr
S	3	Houston Griffith	GS
S	4	Litchfield Ajavon	Jr
CB	5	Cam Hart	Jr
CB	6	Clarence Lewis	So
DL	7	Isaiah Foskey	Jr
LB	8	Marist Liufau	Jr
DL	9	Justin Ademilola	Sr
LB	10	Isaiah Pryor	GS
CB, S	11	Ramon Henderson	So
DL	12	Jordan Botelho	So
LB	13	Paul Moala	Sr
S	14	Kyle Hamilton (C)	Jr
CB	15	Ryan Barnes	Fr
S	16	KJ Wallace	Jr
CB	18	Chance Tucker	Fr
CB	20	JoJo Johnson	Fr
S	20	Justin Walters	Fr
CB	21	Caleb Offord	So
LB	24	Jack Kiser	Jr
CB	25	Philip Riley	Fr
LB	27	JD Bertrand	Jr
CB	28	TaRiq Bracy	Sr
S	29	Khari Gee	Fr
S	30	Chris Velotta	Jr
DL	31	NaNa Osafo-Mensah	Jr
CB	31	Tyler Wilson	Jr
LB	32	Prince Kollie	Fr
LB	33	Shayne Simon	Sr
DL	34	Osita Ekwonu	Jr
S	36	Eddie Scheidler	Jr
S	37	Chase Love	Sr
LB	38	Davis Sherwood	Fr
LB	40	Barret Liebentritt	Fr
LB	40	Drew White (C)	GS
DL	41	Kurt Hinish (C)	GS
S	42	Marty Auer	Fr
LB	42	Giovanni Ghilotti	So
CB	43	Marcus Thorne	Sr
DL	44	Kahanu Kia	Fr
LB	45	Colin Gutzmer	Jr
LB	46	Adam Shibley	GS
DL	47	Jason Onye	Fr
DL	48	Will Schweitzer	Fr
S	49	Mike Graves	Sr
LB	52	Bo Bauer	GS
DL	54	Jacob Lacey	Jr
DL	56	Howard Cross III	Jr
DL	57	Jayson Ademilola	Sr
DL	90	Alexander Ehrensberger	So
DL	92	Aidan Keanaaina	So
DL	93	Zane Heemsoth	Jr
DL	95	Myron Tagovailoa-Amosa (C)	GS
DL	97	Gabriel Rubio	Fr
DL	99	Rylie Mills	So

Special teams

Pos.	#	Name	Class
P	19	Jay Bramblett	Jr
P	30	Jake Rittman	Sr
K	32	Chris Salerno	Fr
K, P	39	Jonathan Doerer	GS
LS	44	Alex Peitsch	So
LS	46	Axel Raarup	Sr
LS	65	Michael Vinson	Sr
K	91	Josh Bryan	Fr
K, P	98	Harrison Leonard	Jr

Head coach

- Brian Kelly (Assumption)

Coordinators/assistant coaches

- Brian Polian (John Carroll)
  Associate head coach
  Special teams coordinator
- Marcus Freeman (Ohio State)
  Defensive coordinator
  Linebackers
- Tommy Rees (Notre Dame)
  Offensive coordinator
  Quarterbacks
- Mike Elston (Michigan)
  Defensive line coach
  Recruiting coordinator
  Run game coordinator
- Lance Taylor (Alabama)
  Running backs coach
  Run game coordinator
- Del Alexander (USC)
  Wide receivers coach
- John McNulty (Penn State)
  Tight ends coach
- Mike Mickens (Cincinnati)
  Cornerbacks coach
- Chris O'Leary (Indiana State)
  Safeties coach
- Jeff Quinn (Elmhurst)
  Offensive line coach
- Matt Balis
  Director of football performance
- Ron Powlus (Notre Dame)
  Associate Athletics Director - Football
- Olivia Mitchell (Notre Dame)
  Director of football operations

Legend

- (C) Team captain
- (S) Suspended
- (I) Ineligible
- Injured
- Redshirt

Roster
Last update: September 17, 2021

== Game summaries ==
=== At Florida State ===
Notre Dame at Florida State
(Rivalry)

Team	1	2	3	4	OT	Total
• No. 9 Fighting Irish	7	10	21	0	3	41
Seminoles	7	7	6	18	0	38

- Date: September 5, 2021
- Location: Doak Campbell Stadium
  Tallahassee, FL
- Game start: 7:30 p.m. EDT
- Elapsed time: 3 hours and 49 minutes
- Game attendance: 68,316
- Game weather: Temperature: 85 °F (29 °C) • Weather: Sunny • Wind: N 2 MPH
- Referee: Jeff Flanagan
- TV announcers (ABC): Joe Tessitore (play–by–play), Greg McElroy (analyst) and Katie George (sideline)

Scoring summary
1	12:46	ND	Michael Mayer 41–yard pass from Jack Coan (Jonathan Doerer kick) (5 plays, 75 yards, 2:09)	ND 7–0
1	05:06	FSU	Jashaun Corbin 89–yard run (Ryan Fitzgerald kick) (2 plays, 89 yards, 0:20)	TIE 7–7
2	10:05	FSU	Jordan Travis 2–yard run (Ryan Fitzgerald kick) (4 plays, 45 yards, 1:39)	FS 14–7
2	05:02	ND	Jonathan Doerer 48–yard field goal (10 plays, 46 yards, 5:03)	FS 14–10
2	02:21	ND	Joe Wilkins Jr. 23–yard pass from Jack Coan (Jonathan Doerer kick) (5 plays, 48 yards, 1:24)	ND 17–14
3	13:36	FSU	Ja'Khi Douglas 60–yard pass from Jordan Travis (Alex Mastromanno pass failed) (3 plays, 63 yards, 1:07)	FS 20–17
3	11:52	ND	Kevin Austin Jr. 37–yard pass from Jack Coan (Jonathan Doerer kick) (4 plays, 75 yards, 1:44)	ND 24–20
3	07:05	ND	Kyren Williams 6–yard pass from Jack Coan (Jonathan Doerer kick) (7 plays, 69 yards, 4:17)	ND 31–20
3	04:37	ND	Chris Tyree 1–yard run (Jonathan Doerer kick) (3 plays, 32 yards, 0:58)	ND 38–20
4	13:42	FSU	Andrew Parchment 8–yard pass from Jordan Travis (Keyshawn Helton pass) (15 plays, 75 yards, 5:55)	ND 38–28
4	05:36	FSU	Treshaun Ward 2–yard run (Ryan Fitzgerald kick) (12 plays, 88 yards, 4:43)	ND 38–35
4	00:40	FSU	Ryan Fitzgerald 43–yard field goal (10 plays, 46 yards, 3:35)	TIE 38–38
OT	00:00	ND	Jonathan Doerer 41–yard field goal (4 plays, 2 yards, 0:00)	ND 41–38

Statistics	Notre Dame	Florida State
First downs	17	19
Total yards	431	442
Rushing yards	65	264
Passing yards	366	178
Turnovers	1	3
Time of possession	30:35	29:25

Team	Category	Player	Statistics
Notre Dame	Passing	Jack Coan	26/35, 366 yards, 4 TDs, 1 INT
Notre Dame	Rushing	Kyren Williams	18 carries, 42 yards
Notre Dame	Receiving	Michael Mayer	9 receptions, 120 yards, 1 TD
Florida State	Passing	Jordan Travis	9/19, 130 yards, 2 TDs, 3 INT
Florida State	Rushing	Jashaun Corbin	15 carries, 144 yards, 1 TD
Florida State	Receiving	Keyshawn Helton	4 receptions, 53 yards

=== Toledo ===
Toledo at Notre Dame

Team	1	2	3	4	Total
Rockets	6	10	0	13	29
• No. 8 Fighting Irish	7	7	0	18	32

- Date: September 11, 2021
- Location: Notre Dame Stadium
  South Bend, IN
- Game start: 2:35 p.m. EDT
- Elapsed time: 3 hours and 27 minutes
- Game attendance: 62,009
- Game weather: Temperature: 82 °F (28 °C) • Weather: Sunny • Wind: S 11 MPH
- Referee: Duane Heydt
- TV announcers (Peacock): Mike Tirico (play–by–play), Drew Brees (analyst) and Kathryn Tappen (sideline)

Scoring summary
1	12:45	ND	Michael Mayer 4–yard pass from Jack Coan (Jonathan Doerer kick) (6 plays, 75 yards, 2:15)	ND 7–0
1	10:06	TOL	Thomas Cluckey 31–yard field goal (7 plays, 69 yards, 2:32)	ND 7–3
1	04:14	TOL	Thomas Cluckey 32–yard field goal (6 plays, 42 yards, 2:49)	ND 7–6
2	09:21	ND	Kyren Williams 43–yard run (Jonathan Doerer kick) (5 plays, 96 yards, 2:13)	ND 14–6
2	01:04	TOL	Thomas Cluckey 23–yard field goal (10 plays, 35 yards, 4:00)	ND 14–9
2	00:46	TOL	Chris McDonald Jr. 27–yard interception (Thomas Cluckey kick)	TOL 16–14
4	12:25	ND	Jonathan Doerer 48–yard field goal (13 plays, 55 yards, 6:11)	ND 17–16
4	10:57	ND	Chris Tyree 55–yard pass from Tyler Buchner (Jonathan Doerer kick) (1 play, 55 yards, 0:09)	ND 24–16
4	07:48	TOL	Bryant Koback 8–yard run (Carter Bradley pass failed) (6 plays, 89 yards, 3:03)	ND 24–22
4	01:35	TOL	Dequan Finn 26–yard run (Thomas Cluckey kick) (7 plays, 73 yards, 1:51)	TOL 29–24
4	01:09	ND	Michael Mayer 18–yard pass from Jack Coan (Kyren Williams pass) (3 plays, 75 yards, 0:26)	ND 32–29

Statistics	Toledo	Notre Dame
First downs	16	27
Total yards	353	449
Rushing yards	132	132
Passing yards	221	317
Turnovers	2	4
Time of possession	30:04	29:56

Team	Category	Player	Statistics
Toledo	Passing	Carter Bradley	17/27, 213 yards
Toledo	Rushing	Bryant Koback	21 carries, 122 yards, 1 TD
Toledo	Receiving	Devin Maddox	9 receptions, 135 yards
Notre Dame	Passing	Jack Coan	21/33, 239 yards, 2 TDs, 1 INT
Notre Dame	Rushing	Kyren Williams	16 carries, 78 yards, 1 TD
Notre Dame	Receiving	Michael Mayer	7 receptions, 81 yards, 2 TDs

=== Purdue ===
Purdue at Notre Dame
(Shillelagh Trophy)

Team	1	2	3	4	Total
Boilermakers	3	0	10	0	13
• No. 12 Fighting Irish	0	10	7	10	27

- Date: September 18, 2021
- Location: Notre Dame Stadium
  South Bend, IN
- Game start: 2:41 p.m. EDT
- Elapsed time: 3 hours and 48 minutes
- Game attendance: 74,341
- Game weather: Temperature: 82 °F (28 °C) • Weather: Sunny • Wind: NE 6 MPH
- Referee: Jeffrey Servinski
- TV announcers (NBC): Mike Tirico (play–by–play), Drew Brees (analyst) and Kathryn Tappen (sideline)

Scoring summary
1	09:58	PUR	Mitchell Fineran 34–yard field goal (10 plays, 32 yards, 3:41)	PUR 3–0
2	13:51	ND	Kyren Williams 39–yard pass from Jack Coan (Jonathan Doerer kick) (5 plays, 66 yards, 2:14)	ND 7–3
2	08:45	ND	Jonathan Doerer 28–yard field goal (10 plays, 48 yards, 3:13)	ND 10–3
3	11:06	PUR	Mitchell Fineran 34–yard field goal (9 plays, 50 yards, 3:54)	ND 10–6
3	09:59	ND	Avery Davis 62–yard pass from Jack Coan (Jonathan Doerer kick) (3 plays, 75 yards, 1:07)	ND 17–6
3	07:08	PUR	Milton Wright 2–yard pass from Jack Plummer (Mitchell Fineran kick) (6 plays, 75 yards, 2:51)	ND 17–13
4	10:50	ND	Jonathan Doerer 30–yard field goal (11 plays, 53 yards, 5:20)	ND 20–13
4	06:05	ND	Kyren Williams 51–yard run (Jonathan Doerer kick) (1 play, 51 yards, 0:11)	ND 27–13

Statistics	Purdue	Notre Dame
First downs	19	16
Total yards	348	343
Rushing yards	57	120
Passing yards	291	223
Turnovers	1	0
Time of possession	34:11	25:49

Team	Category	Player	Statistics
Purdue	Passing	Jack Plummer	25/36, 187 yards, 1 TD
Purdue	Rushing	King Doerue	10 carries, 45 yards
Purdue	Receiving	Jackson Anthrop	7 receptions, 90 yards
Notre Dame	Passing	Jack Coan	15/31, 223 yards, 2 TDs
Notre Dame	Rushing	Kyren Williams	12 carries, 91 yards, 1 TD
Notre Dame	Receiving	Avery Davis	5 receptions, 120 yards, 1 TD

=== Vs. No. 18 Wisconsin ===
Notre Dame vs. Wisconsin
(Shamrock Series / Big Noon Kickoff / College GameDay)

Team	1	2	3	4	Total
No. 18 Badgers	3	0	7	3	13
• No. 12 Fighting Irish	0	10	0	31	41

- Date: September 25, 2021
- Location: Soldier Field
  Chicago, IL
- Game start: 11:04 a.m. CDT
- Elapsed time: 4 hours and 7 minutes
- Game attendance: 59,571
- Game weather: Temperature: 63 °F (17 °C) • Weather: Sunny • Wind: W 11 MPH
- Referee: Michael Cannon
- TV announcers (Fox): Gus Johnson (play–by–play), Joel Klatt (analyst) and Jenny Taft (sideline)

Scoring summary
1	11:48	WIS	Collin Larsh 37–yard field goal (5 plays, 26 yards, 1:54)	WIS 3–0
2	08:44	ND	Jonathan Doerer 51–yard field goal (16 plays, 45 yards, 6:29)	TIE 3–3
2	04:48	ND	Kevin Austin Jr. 36–yard pass from Jack Coan (Jonathan Doerer kick) (5 plays, 51 yards, 2:18)	ND 10–3
3	09:53	WIS	Kendric Pryor 8–yard pass from Graham Mertz (Collin Larsh kick) (4 plays, 56 yards, 2:01)	TIE 10–10
4	14:14	WIS	Collin Larsh 27–yard field goal (9 plays, 30 yards, 3:44)	WIS 13–10
4	14:01	ND	Chris Tyree 96–yard kickoff return (Jonathan Doerer kick)	ND 17–13
4	09:34	ND	Kevin Austin Jr. 16–yard pass from Drew Pyne (Jonathan Doerer kick) (6 plays, 46 yards, 2:40)	ND 24–13
4	03:20	ND	Jonathan Doerer 37–yard field goal (4 plays, 4 yards, 1:45)	ND 27–13
4	02:13	ND	Jack Kiser 66–yard interception (Jonathan Doerer kick)	ND 34–13
4	01:01	ND	Drew White 45–yard interception (Jonathan Doerer kick)	ND 41–13

Statistics	Wisconsin	Notre Dame
First downs	16	17
Total yards	318	242
Rushing yards	78	3
Passing yards	240	239
Turnovers	5	1
Time of possession	28:24	31:36

For this season's Shamrock Series, Notre Dame kept with tradition by donning special uniforms. The team wore its usual gold helmet that featured four stars on the back of the helmet, which honors the Flag of Chicago. The school's blue uniform had sleeves featuring two gold stripes, which resemble the rivers and waterways represented on Chicago's flag. The all-white numbers are block slab-serif, which represent the "City of Broad Shoulders". The back collar of the uniform displays Notre Dame's mission statement, which is to "Graduate Champions". The pants are a nod to the Fighting Irish team that played the first football game at Soldier Field in 1924, the same year the university won its first championship. The pants are gold, with two blue lines with a white line in the middle, running down the side of the leg.

With this victory, Brian Kelly became the winningest coach in Notre Dame history with victory number 106, surpassing Knute Rockne in his 12th season with the Fighting Irish.

Team	Category	Player	Statistics
Wisconsin	Passing	Graham Mertz	18/41, 240 yards, 1 TD, 4 INTs
Wisconsin	Rushing	Chez Mellusi	18 carries, 54 yards
Wisconsin	Receiving	Kendric Pryor	6 receptions, 69 yards, 1 TD
Notre Dame	Passing	Jack Coan	15/29, 158 yards, 1 TD
Notre Dame	Rushing	Kyren Williams	18 carries, 33 yards
Notre Dame	Receiving	Kevin Austin Jr.	6 receptions, 76 yards, 2 TDs

=== No. 7 Cincinnati ===
Cincinnati at Notre Dame

Team	1	2	3	4	Total
• No. 7 Bearcats	0	17	0	7	24
No. 9 Fighting Irish	0	0	7	6	13

- Date: October 2, 2021
- Location: Notre Dame Stadium
  South Bend, IN
- Game start: 2:41 p.m. EDT
- Elapsed time: 3 hours and 29 minutes
- Game attendance: 77,622
- Game weather: Temperature: 70 °F (21 °C) • Weather: Cloudy • Wind: SW 9 MPH
- Referee: Marcus Woods
- TV announcers (NBC): Mike Tirico (play–by–play), Drew Brees (analyst) and Kathryn Tappen (sideline)

Scoring summary
2	12:09	CIN	Leonard Taylor 1–yard pass from Desmond Ridder (Cole Smith kick) (3 plays, 8 yards, 1:12)	CIN 7–0
2	10:32	CIN	Cole Smith 23–yard field goal (5 plays, 12 yards, 1:37)	CIN 10–0
2	00:40	CIN	Tre Tucker 27–yard pass from Desmond Ridder (Cole Smith kick) (5 plays, 80 yards, 1:08)	CIN 17–0
3	01:19	ND	Kyren Williams 3–yard run (Jonathan Doerer kick) (4 plays, 38 yards, 2:01)	CIN 17–7
4	08:20	ND	Braden Lenzy 32–yard pass from Drew Pyne (Jonathan Doerer kick failed) (8 plays, 80 yards, 3:08)	CIN 17–13
4	05:08	CIN	Desmond Ridder 6–yard run (Cole Smith kick) (6 plays, 75 yards, 3:12)	CIN 24–13

Statistics	Cincinnati	Notre Dame
First downs	16	19
Total yards	390	341
Rushing yards	93	84
Passing yards	297	257
Turnovers	4	2
Time of possession	28:10	31:50

Team	Category	Player	Statistics
Cincinnati	Passing	Desmond Ridder	19/32, 297 yards, 2 TDs
Cincinnati	Rushing	Jerome Ford	17 carries, 71 yards
Cincinnati	Receiving	Alec Pierce	6 receptions, 144 yards
Notre Dame	Passing	Drew Pyne	9/22, 143 yards, 1 TD
Notre Dame	Rushing	Kyren Williams	13 carries, 45 yards, 1 TD
Notre Dame	Receiving	Michael Mayer	8 receptions, 93 yards

=== At Virginia Tech ===
Notre Dame at Virginia Tech

Team	1	2	3	4	Total
• No. 14 Fighting Irish	0	14	7	11	32
Hokies	7	6	9	7	29

- Date: October 9, 2021
- Location: Lane Stadium
  Blacksburg, VA
- Game start: 7:30 p.m. EDT
- Elapsed time: 3 hours, 33 minutes
- Game attendance: 65,632
- Game weather: Temperature: 61 °F (16 °C) • Weather: Cloudy • Wind: NE 0 MPH
- Referee: Jerry Magallanes
- TV announcers (ACCN): Dave O'Brien (play–by–play), Tim Hasselbeck (analyst) and Kelsey Riggs (sideline)

Scoring summary
1	3:22	VT	Raheem Blackshear 7–yard run (John Parker Romo kick) (7 plays, 80 yards, 3:54)	VT 7–0
2	10:35	VT	John Parker Romo 19–yard field goal (14 plays, 29 yards, 6:08)	VT 10–0
2	6:51	ND	Tyler Buchner 3–yard run (Jonathan Doerer kick) (7 plays, 75 yards, 3:44)	ND 10–7
2	0:32	ND	Kyren Williams 8–yard pass from Tyler Buchner (Jonathan Doerer kick) (9 plays, 80 yards, 1:03)	ND 14–10
2	0:00	VT	John Parker Romo 52–yard field goal (5 plays, 46 yards, 0:28)	ND 14–13
3	8:53	VT	John Parker Romo 26–yard field goal (11 plays, 61 yards, 6:01)	VT 16–14
3	4:27	ND	Kyren Williams 10–yard run (Jonathan Doerer kick) (4 plays, 29 yards, 1:56)	ND 21–16
3	0:50	VT	Jermaine Waller 26–yard Interception Return (Two-Point Conversion Failed) (5 plays, 15 yards, 1:58)	VT 22–21
4	3:55	VT	Braxton Burmeister 19–yard run (John Parker Romo kick) (9 plays, 56 yards, 3:44)	VT 29–21
4	2:26	ND	Avery Davis 4–yard pass from Jack Coan (Jack Coan pass to Kevin Austin Jr. for Two-Point Conversion) (7 plays, 75 yards, 1:29)	TIE 29–29
4	0:17	ND	Jonathan Doerer 48–yard field goal (7 plays, 45 yards, 1:34)	ND 32–29

Statistics	Notre Dame	Virginia Tech
First downs	21	21
Total yards	401	321
Rushing yards	180	134
Passing yards	221	187
Turnovers	2	2
Time of possession	28:36	31:24

Team	Category	Player	Statistics
Notre Dame	Passing	Tyler Buchner	6/14, 113 yards, TD, 2 INT
Notre Dame	Rushing	Kyren Williams	19 carries, 81 yards, TD
Notre Dame	Receiving	Kevin Austin Jr.	3 receptions, 70 yards
Virginia Tech	Passing	Braxton Burmeister	15/30, 184 yards, INT
Virginia Tech	Rushing	Braxton Burmeister	10 carries, 49 yards, TD
Virginia Tech	Receiving	Tré Turner	6 receptions, 80 yards

=== USC ===
USC at No. 13 Notre Dame
(Jeweled Shillelagh)

Team	1	2	3	4	Total
Trojans	0	3	0	13	16
• No. 13 Fighting Irish	7	10	7	7	31

- Date: October 23, 2021
- Location: Notre Dame Stadium
  South Bend, IN
- Game start: 7:30 p.m. EDT
- Elapsed time: 3 hours 16 minutes
- Game attendance: 77,622
- Game weather: Temperature: N/A • Weather: Sunny • Wind: NW 5 MPH
- Referee: Chris Coyte
- TV announcers (NBC): Mike Tirico (play–by–play), Drew Brees (analyst) and Kathryn Tappen (sideline)

Scoring summary
1	4:09	ND	Avery Davis 4–yard pass from Jack Coan (Jonathan Doerer kick) (11 plays, 70 yards, 4:53)	ND 7–0
2	13:24	ND	Jonathan Doerer 21–yard field goal (4 plays, 1 yard, 1:20)	ND 10–0
2	7:29	USC	Parker Lewis 33–yard field goal (13 plays, 60 yards, 5:55)	ND 10–3
2	4:13	ND	Kyren Williams 5–yard run (Jonathan Doerer kick) (9 plays, 75 yards, 3:16)	ND 17–3
3	2:51	ND	Kyren Williams 1–yard run (Jonathan Doerer kick) (13 plays, 80 yards, 5:17)	ND 24–3
4	14:52	USC	Keaontay Ingram 4–yard run (Parker Lewis kick) (9 plays, 77 yards, 2:59)	ND 24–10
4	8:51	USC	Darwin Barlow 3–yard run (Parker Lewis PAT failed) (8 plays, 86 yards, 2:34)	ND 24–16
4	4:52	ND	Tyler Buchner 3–yard run (Jonathan Doerer kick) (8 plays, 75 yards, 3:59)	ND 31–16

Statistics	USC	Notre Dame
First downs	25	26
Total yards	428	383
Rushing yards	129	170
Passing yards	299	213
Turnovers	2	1
Time of possession	28:37	31:23

Team	Category	Player	Statistics
USC	Passing	Kedon Slovis	27/37, 299 yards, INT
USC	Rushing	Keaontay Ingram	24 carries, 138 yards, TD
USC	Receiving	Drake London	15 receptions, 171 yards
Notre Dame	Passing	Jack Coan	20/28, 189 yards, TD, INT
Notre Dame	Rushing	Kyren Williams	25 carries, 138 yards, 2 TD
Notre Dame	Receiving	Lorenzo Styles Jr.	3 receptions, 57 yards

=== North Carolina ===
North Carolina at Notre Dame
(Rivalry)

Team	1	2	3	4	Total
Tar Heels	0	13	14	7	34
• No. 11 Fighting Irish	7	10	14	13	44

- Date: October 30, 2021
- Location: Notre Dame Stadium
  South Bend, IN
- Game start: 7:30 p.m. EDT
- Elapsed time: 3 hours, 22 minutes
- Game attendance: 71,018
- Game weather: Temperature: 51 °F (11 °C) • Weather: Sunny • Wind:
- Referee: Duane Heydt
- TV announcers (NBC): Mike Tirico (play–by–play), Drew Brees (analyst) and Kathryn Tappen (sideline)

Scoring summary
1	3:25	ND	Avery Davis 7–yard pass from Jack Coan (Jonathan Doerer kick) (7 plays, 41 yards, 3:19)	ND 7–0
2	14:55	UNC	Ty Chandler 3–yard run (Grayson Atkins kick) (8 plays, 81 yards, 3:30)	TIE 7–7
2	10:01	ND	Jonathan Doerer 31–yard field goal (13 plays, 62 yards, 5:54)	ND 10–7
2	3:22	UNC	Grayson Atkins 38–yard field goal (13 plays, 63 yards, 6:39)	TIE 10–10
2	1:23	ND	Kevin Austin Jr. 21–yard pass from Jack Coan (Jonathan Doerer kick) (6 plays, 75 yards, 1:59)	ND 17–10
2	0:02	UNC	Grayson Atkins 26-yard field goal (7 plays, 51 yards, 1:21)	ND 17–13
3	13:21	UNC	Ty Chandler 53-yard run (Gaydon Atkins kick) (5 plays, 79 yards, 1:39)	UNC 20–17
3	12:23	ND	Jack Coan 21–yard run (Jonathan Doerer kick) (3 plays, 75 yards, 0:58)	ND 24–20
3	4:56	ND	Logan Diggs 1–yard run (Jonathan Doerer kick) (11 plays, 81 yards, 5:24)	ND 31–20
3	2:48	UNC	Antonie Green 33–yard pass from Sam Howell (Grayson Atkins kick) (6 plays, 75 yards, 2:08)	ND 31–27
4	14:27	ND	Kyren Williams 91–yard run (Jonathan Doerer kick) (1 play, 91 yards, 0:17)	ND 38–27
4	11:52	ND	Jonathan Doerer 20-yard field goal (5 plays, 15 yards, 2:28)	ND 41–27
4	7:23	UNC	Sam Howell 31–yard run (Grayson Atkins kick) (10 plays, 75 yards, 4:29)	ND 41–34
4	4:52	ND	Jonathan Doerer 21-yard field goal (13 plays, 73 yards, 5:46)	ND 44–34

Statistics	North Carolina	Notre Dame
First downs	28	26
Total yards	554	523
Rushing yards	213	293
Passing yards	341	230
Turnovers	1	0
Time of possession	30:15	29:45

Team	Category	Player	Statistics
North Carolina	Passing	Sam Howell	24/31, 341 yards, TD, INT
North Carolina	Rushing	Sam Howell	18 carries, 91 yards, TD
North Carolina	Receiving	Josh Downs	10 receptions, 142 yards
Notre Dame	Passing	Jack Coan	16/24, 213 yards, TD
Notre Dame	Rushing	Kyren Williams	22 carries, 199 yards, TD
Notre Dame	Receiving	Lorenzo Styles Jr.	3 receptions, 74 yards

=== Navy ===
Navy at No. 10 Notre Dame
(Rip Miller Trophy)

Team	1	2	3	4	Total
Midshipmen	3	0	3	0	6
• No. 10 Fighting Irish	0	17	0	17	34

- Date: November 6, 2021
- Location: Notre Dame Stadium
  South Bend, IN
- Game start: 3:30 p.m. EDT
- Elapsed time: 2 hours, 59 minutes
- Game attendance: 77,096
- Game weather: Temperature: 55 °F (13 °C) • Weather: Sunny • Wind: SW 3 MPH
- Referee: Henry Johns
- TV announcers (NBC): Mike Tirico (play–by–play), Drew Brees (analyst) and Kathryn Tappen (sideline)

Scoring summary
1	3:03	NAVY	Bijan Nichols 49–yard field goal (13 plays, 36 yards, 7:36)	NAVY 3–0
2	9:47	ND	Jonathan Doerer 24–yard field goal (11 plays, 74 yards, 3:45)	TIE 3–3
2	2:46	ND	Kyren Williams 1–yard run (Jonathan Doerer kick) (11 plays, 66 yards, 5:00)	ND 10–3
2	0:50	ND	Kyren Williams 5–yard run (Jonathan Doerer kick) (5 plays, 95 yards, 1:00)	ND 17–3
3	5:16	NAVY	Bijan Nichols 21–yard field goal (14 plays, 71 yards, 9:44)	ND 17–6
4	13:20	ND	Team Safety (2 plays, –1 yard, 0:49)	ND 19–6
4	10:55	ND	Kyren Williams 20–yard run (Jack Coan pass to Braden Lenzy for Two-Point Conversion) (7 plays, 54 yards, 2:25)	ND 27–6
4	3:13	ND	Logan Diggs 8–yard run (Jonathan Doerer kick) (7 plays, 53 yards, 3:45)	ND 34–6

Statistics	Navy	Notre Dame
First downs	11	21
Total yards	184	430
Rushing yards	166	150
Passing yards	18	280
Turnovers	0	0
Time of possession	34:33	25:27

Team	Category	Player	Statistics
Navy	Passing	Xavier Arline	1/2, 18 yards
Navy	Rushing	Isaac Ruoss	22 carries, 73 yards
Navy	Receiving	Jayden Umbarger	1 reception, 18 yards
Notre Dame	Passing	Jack Coan	23/29, 269 yards, TD
Notre Dame	Rushing	Kyren Williams	17 carries, 95 yards, 2 TD
Notre Dame	Receiving	Kevin Austin Jr.	6 receptions, 139 yards, TD

=== At Virginia ===
Notre Dame at Virginia

Team	1	2	3	4	Total
• No. 9 Fighting Irish	7	14	7	0	28
Cavaliers	0	0	0	3	3

- Date: November 13, 2021
- Location: Scott Stadium
  Charlottesville, VA
- Game start: 7:30 p.m. EDT
- Elapsed time: 3 hours
- Game attendance: 48,584
- Game weather: Temperature: N/A • Weather: Sunny • Wind: N/A
- Referee: Duane Heydt
- TV announcers (ABC): Dave Pasch, Dusty Dvoracek, Tom Luginbill

Scoring summary
1	4:53	ND	Michael Mayer 6–yard pass from Jack Coan (Jonathan Doerer kick) (6 plays, 43 yards, 2:40)	ND 7–0
2	14:11	ND	Braden Lenzy 4–yard pass from Jack Coan (Jonathan Doerer kick) (7 plays, 60 yards, 3:28)	ND 14–0
2	4:33	ND	Kyren Williams 22–yard run (Jonathan Doerer kick) (9 plays, 80 yards, 4:13)	ND 21–0
3	1:41	ND	Kevin Austin Jr. 15–yard pass from Jack Coan (Jonathan Doerer kick) (5 plays, 61 yards, 2:20)	ND 28–0
4	12:16	UVA	Brendan Farrell 34-yard field goal (10 plays, 59 yards, 4:25)	ND 28–3

Statistics	Notre Dame	Virginia
First downs	22	17
Total yards	423	278
Rushing yards	249	82
Passing yards	174	196
Turnovers	2	2
Time of possession	29:41	30:19

Team	Category	Player	Statistics
Notre Dame	Passing	Jack Coan	15/20, 132 yards, 3 TD, INT
Notre Dame	Rushing	Kyren Williams	14 carries, 70 yards, TD
Notre Dame	Receiving	Michael Mayer	7 receptions, 84 yards, TD
Virginia	Passing	Jay Woolfolk	18/33, 196 yards, 2 INT
Virginia	Rushing	Mike Hollins	9 carries, 44 yards
Virginia	Receiving	Keytaon Thompson	9 receptions, 110 yards

=== Georgia Tech ===
Georgia Tech at Notre Dame
(Rivalry)

Team	1	2	3	4	Total
Yellow Jackets	0	0	0	0	0
• No. 8 Fighting Irish	24	21	10	0	55

- Date: November 20, 2021
- Location: Notre Dame Stadium
  South Bend, IN
- Game start: 2:30 p.m. EDT
- Elapsed time: 3 hours, 1 minute
- Game attendance: 71,011
- Game weather: Temperature: 43 °F (6 °C) • Weather: Sunny • Wind: SW 14 MPH
- Referee: Stuart Mullins
- TV announcers (NBC): Mike Tirico (play–by–play), Drew Brees (analyst) and Kathryn Tappen (sideline)

Scoring summary
1	12:35	ND	Jonathan Doerer 41-yard field goal (5 plays, 25 yards, 2:25)	ND 3–0
1	10:33	ND	Jack Kiser 43–yard interception return (Jonathan Doerer kick) (5 plays, 25 yards, 1:57)	ND 10–0
1	4:57	ND	Kyren Williams 9–yard run (Jonathan Doerer kick) (9 plays, 65 yards, 3:29)	ND 17–0
1	0:08	ND	Michael Mayer 52–yard pass from Jack Coan (Jonathan Doerer kick) (4 plays, 69 yards, 1:22)	ND 24–0
2	10:41	ND	Logan Diggs 5–yard run (Jonathan Doerer kick) (7 plays, 61 yards, 3:45)	ND 31–0
2	7:21	ND	Logan Diggs 20–yard pass from Jack Coan (Jonathan Doerer kick) (4 plays, 60 yards, 1:47)	ND 38–0
2	4:33	ND	Kyren Williams 1–yard run (Jonathan Doerer kick) (7 plays, 89 yards, 3:01)	ND 45–0
3	6:45	ND	Jonathan Doerer 26–yard field goal (6 plays, 86 yards, 3:02)	ND 48–0
3	4:33	ND	Myron Tagovailoa-Amosa 70–yard fumble return (Josh Bryan kick) (5 plays, 46 yards, 1:48)	ND 55–0
4			No scoring plays

Statistics	Georgia Tech	Notre Dame
First downs	11	23
Total yards	224	514
Rushing yards	128	212
Passing yards	96	302
Turnovers	2	0
Time of possession	30:39	29:21

Team	Category	Player	Statistics
Georgia Tech	Passing	Jordan Yates	14/28, 96 yards, INT
Georgia Tech	Rushing	Jahmyr Gibbs	12 carries, 58 yards
Georgia Tech	Receiving	Malachi Carter	3 receptions, 89 yards
Notre Dame	Passing	Jack Coan	15/20, 285 yards, 2 TD
Notre Dame	Rushing	Tyler Buchner	5 carries, 67 yards
Notre Dame	Receiving	Kevin Austin Jr.	2 receptions, 89 yards

=== At Stanford ===
Notre Dame at Stanford
(Legends Trophy)

Team	1	2	3	4	Total
• No. 6 Fighting Irish	7	17	7	14	45
Cardinal	0	0	7	7	14

- Date: November 27, 2021
- Location: Stanford Stadium
  Palo Alto, CA
- Game start: 8:00 p.m. EDT
- Elapsed time: 3 hours, 10 minutes
- Game attendance: 31,571
- Game weather: Temperature: 66 °F (19 °C) • Weather: Sunny • Wind: NW 3 MPH
- Referee: Gary Patterson
- TV announcers (FOX): Joe Davis (play-by-play) & Brock Huard (analyst)

Scoring summary
1	9:39	ND	Braden Lenzy 16–yard pass from Jack Coan (Jonathan Doerer kick) (5 plays, 74 yards, 3:00)	ND 7–0
2	14:30	ND	George Takacs 2–yard pass from Jack Coan (Jonathan Doerer kick) (9 plays, 69 yards, 3:40)	ND 14–0
2	11:27	ND	Jonathan Doerer 36–yard field goal (4 plays, 5 yards, 2:23)	ND 17–0
2	4:47	ND	Kyren Williams 1–yard run (Jonathan Doerer kick) (12 plays, 75 yards, 5:09)	ND 24–0
3	13:06	STAN	Austin Jones 5-yard run (Joshua Karty kick) (2 plays, 13 yards, 0:39)	ND 24–7
3	11:31	ND	Jack Coan 1–yard run (Jonathan Doerer kick) (4 plays, 75 yards, 1:35)	ND 31–7
4	14:33	ND	Tyler Buchner 33–yard run (Jonathan Doerer kick) (3 plays, 72 yards, 0:35)	ND 38–7
4	11:44	STAN	Benjamin Yurosek 49–yard pass from Tanner McKee (Joshua Karty kick) (6 plays, 75 yards, 2:49)	ND 38–14
4	0:58	ND	Kyren Williams 12-yard run (Jonathan Doerer kick) (9 plays, 77 yards, 5:26)	ND 45–14

Statistics	Notre Dame	Stanford
First downs	26	11
Total yards	509	227
Rushing yards	168	55
Passing yards	341	172
Turnovers	1	2
Time of possession	34:10	25:50

Team	Category	Player	Statistics
Notre Dame	Passing	Jack Coan	26/35, 345 yards, 2 TD, INT
Notre Dame	Rushing	Kyren Williams	19 carries, 74 yards, 2 TD
Notre Dame	Receiving	Kevin Austin Jr.	6 carries, 125 yards
Stanford	Passing	Tanner McKee	20/25, 172 yards, TD
Stanford	Rushing	Austin Jones	9 carries, 35 yards, TD
Stanford	Receiving	Benjamin Yurosek	5 receptions, 87 yards, TD

=== Vs. Oklahoma State (Fiesta Bowl) ===
Notre Dame vs. Oklahoma State
(PlayStation Fiesta Bowl)

Team	1	2	3	4	Total
• No. 9 Cowboys	7	7	17	6	37
No. 5 Fighting Irish	14	14	0	7	35

- Date: January 1, 2022
- Location: State Farm Stadium
  Glendale, AZ
- Game start: 1:00 p.m. EST
- Elapsed time: 3 hours, 54 minutes
- Game attendance: 49,550
- Game weather: Weather: Indoors • Wind: N/A
- Referee: Jerry McGinn
- TV announcers (ESPN): Bob Wischusen (play–by–play), Dan Orlovsky (analyst), Kris Budden (sideline)

Scoring summary
1	13:21	ND	Lorenzo Styles Jr. 29–yard pass from Jack Coan (Jonathan Doerer kick) (5 plays, 75 yards, 1:39)	ND 7–0
1	7:05	ND	Chris Tyree 53–yard pass from Jack Coan (Jonathan Doerer kick) (4 plays, 66 yards, 2:08)	ND 14–0
1	1:46	OSU	Jaden Bray 9–yard pass from Spencer Sanders (Tanner Brown kick) (8 plays, 82 yards, 2:29)	ND 14–7
2	11:04	ND	Michael Mayer 16–yard pass from Jack Coan (Jonathan Doerer kick) (10 plays, 78 yards, 3:43)	ND 21–7
2	1:16	ND	Michael Mayer 7–yard pass from Jack Coan (Jonathan Doerer kick) (11 plays, 84 yards, 4:25)	ND 28–7
2	0:37	OSU	Tay Martin 9–yard pass from Spencer Sanders (Tanner Brown kick) (4 plays, 75 yards, 0:39)	ND 28–14
3	10:52	OSU	Tay Martin 5-yard pass from Spencer Sanders (Tanner Brown kick) (12 plays, 87 yards, 4:08)	ND 28–21
3	2:47	OSU	Tay Martin 8–yard pass from Spencer Sanders (Tanner Brown kick) (10 plays, 89 yards, 2:22)	TIE 28–28
3	0:06	OSU	Tanner Brown 38–yard field goal (7 plays, 36 yards, 2:17)	OSU 31–28
4	9:07	OSU	Tanner Brown 41–yard field goal (7 plays, 37 yards, 2:40)	OSU 34–28
4	2:16	OSU	Tanner Brown 25–yard field goal (4 plays, 7 yards, 0:22)	OSU 37–28
4	1:05	ND	Kevin Austin Jr. 25-yard pass from Jack Coan (Jonathan Doerer kick) (8 plays, 75 yards, 1:11)	OSU 37–35

Statistics	Oklahoma State	Notre Dame
First downs	34	27
Total yards	605	551
Rushing yards	234	42
Passing yards	371	509
Turnovers	2	2
Time of possession	29:06	30:54

Team	Category	Player	Statistics
Oklahoma State	Passing	Spencer Sanders	34/51, 371 yards, 4 TD
Oklahoma State	Rushing	Spencer Sanders	17 carries, 125 yards
Oklahoma State	Receiving	Brennan Presley	10 receptions, 137 yards
Notre Dame	Passing	Jack Coan	38/68, 509 yards, 5 TD, INT
Notre Dame	Rushing	Logan Diggs	9 carries, 29 yards
Notre Dame	Receiving	Lorenzo Styles Jr.	8 receptions, 136 yards, TD
