= 2022 Fiesta Bowl =

2022 Fiesta Bowl may refer to:

- 2022 Fiesta Bowl (January), a bowl game on January 1, 2022, following the 2021 season, between Notre Dame and Oklahoma State
- 2022 Fiesta Bowl (December), a bowl game on December 31, 2022, following the 2022 season, between Michigan and TCU
