= Kevin Austin Jr. =

American football player (born 2000)

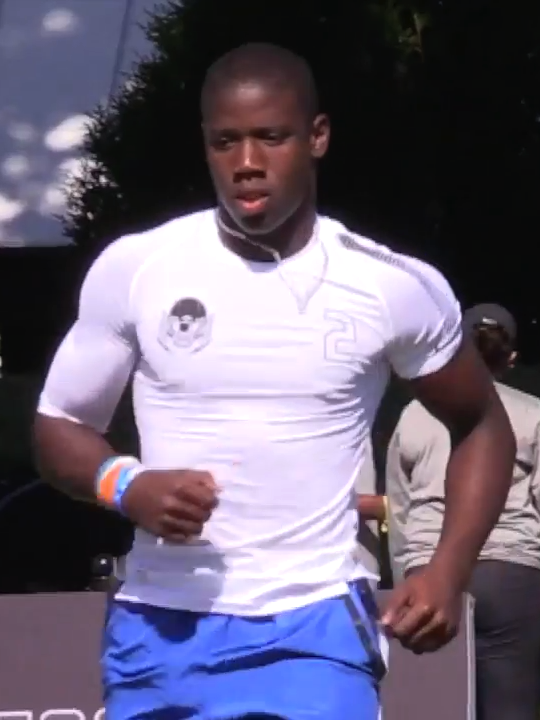
- Austin at The Opening in 2017

No. 81 – New Orleans Saints
- Position: Wide receiver
- Roster status: Practice squad

Personal information
- Born: March 30, 2000 (age 26); Poughkeepsie, New York, U.S.
- Listed height: 6 ft 2 in (1.88 m)
- Listed weight: 200 lb (91 kg)

Career information
- High school: North Broward Preparatory (Coconut Creek, Florida)
- College: Notre Dame (2018–2021)
- NFL draft: 2022: undrafted

Career history
- Jacksonville Jaguars (2022–2023)*; Birmingham Stallions (2024); New Orleans Saints (2024–present)
- * Offseason or practice squad member only

Awards and highlights
- UFL champion (2024); Phil Steele First-team All-Independent (2021)

Career NFL statistics as of 2025
- Receptions: 24
- Receiving yards: 291
- Receiving touchdowns: 1
- Stats at Pro Football Reference

Kevin Douglas Austin Jr. (born March 30, 2000) is an American professional football wide receiver for the New Orleans Saints of the National Football League (NFL). He played college football for the Notre Dame Fighting Irish.

== Early life ==
Austin grew up in Ft. Lauderdale, Florida. He initially attended Western High School in Davie, Florida before transferring to North Broward Preparatory School after his freshman year. Austin caught 41 passes for 1,021 yards and 13 touchdowns and had 454 rushing yards and six touchdowns on 46 carries in his junior season. He had 35 receptions for 761 yards and 11 touchdowns as a senior. Austin was rated a four-star recruit and committed to play college football at Notre Dame over offers from Clemson, Michigan, Ohio State, and Florida.

College recruiting
Name	Hometown	School	Height	Weight	40^{‡}	Commit date
Kevin Austin Jr. WR	Coconut Creek, Florida	North Broward Preparatory	6 ft 3 in (1.91 m)	198 lb (90 kg)	4.71	Aug 11, 2017
Kevin Austin Jr. WR	Recruit ratings: Rivals: 247Sports:					
Overall recruit ranking:
‡ Refers to 40-yard dash; Note: In many cases, Scout, Rivals, 247Sports, On3, and ESPN may conflict in their listings of height, weight and 40 time.; In these cases, the average was taken. ESPN grades are on a 100-point scale.; Sources: "Notre Dame Commit List for 2018". Rivals.; "Notre Dame: Commits". Scout.; "Scout.com Team Recruiting Rankings". Scout.; "2018 Team Ranking". Rivals.com.

== College career ==
Austin played in 11 games as a freshman and caught 90 yards. He was suspended for his entire sophomore season for undisclosed reasons. Austin missed most of his junior season after suffering a fractured foot in preseason training camp and reinjuring it in practice two games into his return. He had one reception for 18 yards in a limited window of good health. As a senior, he had his first full season as a starter. He caught 48 passes for 888 yards and 7 touchdowns. He would declare for the 2022 NFL draft after the loss in the 2022 Fiesta Bowl against Oklahoma State.

== Professional career ==
Pre-draft measurables
Height	Weight	Arm length	Hand span	Wingspan	40-yard dash	10-yard split	20-yard split	20-yard shuttle	Three-cone drill	Vertical jump	Broad jump
6 ft 2 3/8 in (1.89 m)	200 lb (91 kg)	32 7/8 in (0.84 m)	9 in (0.23 m)	6 ft 7 1/4 in (2.01 m)	4.43 s	1.53 s	2.54 s	4.15 s	6.71 s	39.0 in (0.99 m)	11 ft 0 in (3.35 m)
All values from NFL Combine

=== Jacksonville Jaguars ===
Austin was signed by the Jacksonville Jaguars after going undrafted in the 2022 NFL draft. He was waived on August 30, 2022, and re-signed to the practice squad the next day. He signed a reserve/future contract with Jacksonville on January 23, 2023. On August 19, Austin caught his first professional pass against the Detroit Lions in the Jaguars' second preseason game. He was waived by the Jaguars on August 29.

=== Birmingham Stallions ===
On January 19, 2024, Austin signed with the Birmingham Stallions of the United Football League (UFL). His contract with the Stallions was terminated on July 21, to allow him to sign with an NFL team.

=== New Orleans Saints ===
Austin signed a one-year contract with the New Orleans Saints on July 22, 2024. He was released by the Saints during roster cuts on August 27, and signed with the team's practice squad the next day. On December 7, Austin was promoted to the active roster.

On August 26, 2025, Austin was waived by the Saints as part of final roster cuts and re-signed to the practice squad the following day. He was promoted to the active roster on September 20, but waived two days later. On September 24, Austin was re-signed to the practice squad. On November 19, he was signed to the active roster. Austin was waived on December 2 and re-signed to the practice squad two days later. He was promoted back to the active roster on December 18. In Week 17 against the Tennessee Titans, Austin scored his first career touchdown on a 10-yard pass from Tyler Shough.

On August 31, 2026, Austin was waived by the Saints and re-signed to the practice squad. On October 1, he was promoted to the active roster. On October 10, Austin was waived and re-signed to the practice squad three days later.

== Career statistics ==
=== Professional ===
Legend
	League champion
**Bold**	Career high

Year	Team	League	Games		Receiving						Fumbles	
Year	Team	League	GP	GS	Tgt	Rec	Yds	Avg	Lng	TD	Fum	Lost
2024	BHAM	UFL	**10**	**8**	**23**	**15**	**253**	**16.9**	**80**	**2**	0	0
2024	NO	NFL	8	2	22	11	151	13.7	23	0	**1**	0
2025	NO	NFL	8	1	**23**	13	140	10.8	36	1	0	0
NFL career			16	3	45	24	291	12.1	36	1	1	0

=== College ===
Year	Team	Games		Receiving				Rushing			
Year	Team	GP	GS	Rec	Yds	Avg	TD	Att	Yds	Avg	TD
2018	Notre Dame	11	0	5	90	18.0	0	—	—	—	—
2019	Notre Dame	0	0	DNP							
2020	Notre Dame	2	0	1	18	18.0	0	—	—	—	—
2021	Notre Dame	**13**	**13**	**48**	**888**	**18.5**	**7**	**1**	**8**	**8.0**	0
Career		26	13	54	996	18.4	7	1	8	8.0	0
