= Logan Diggs =

American football player (born 2002)

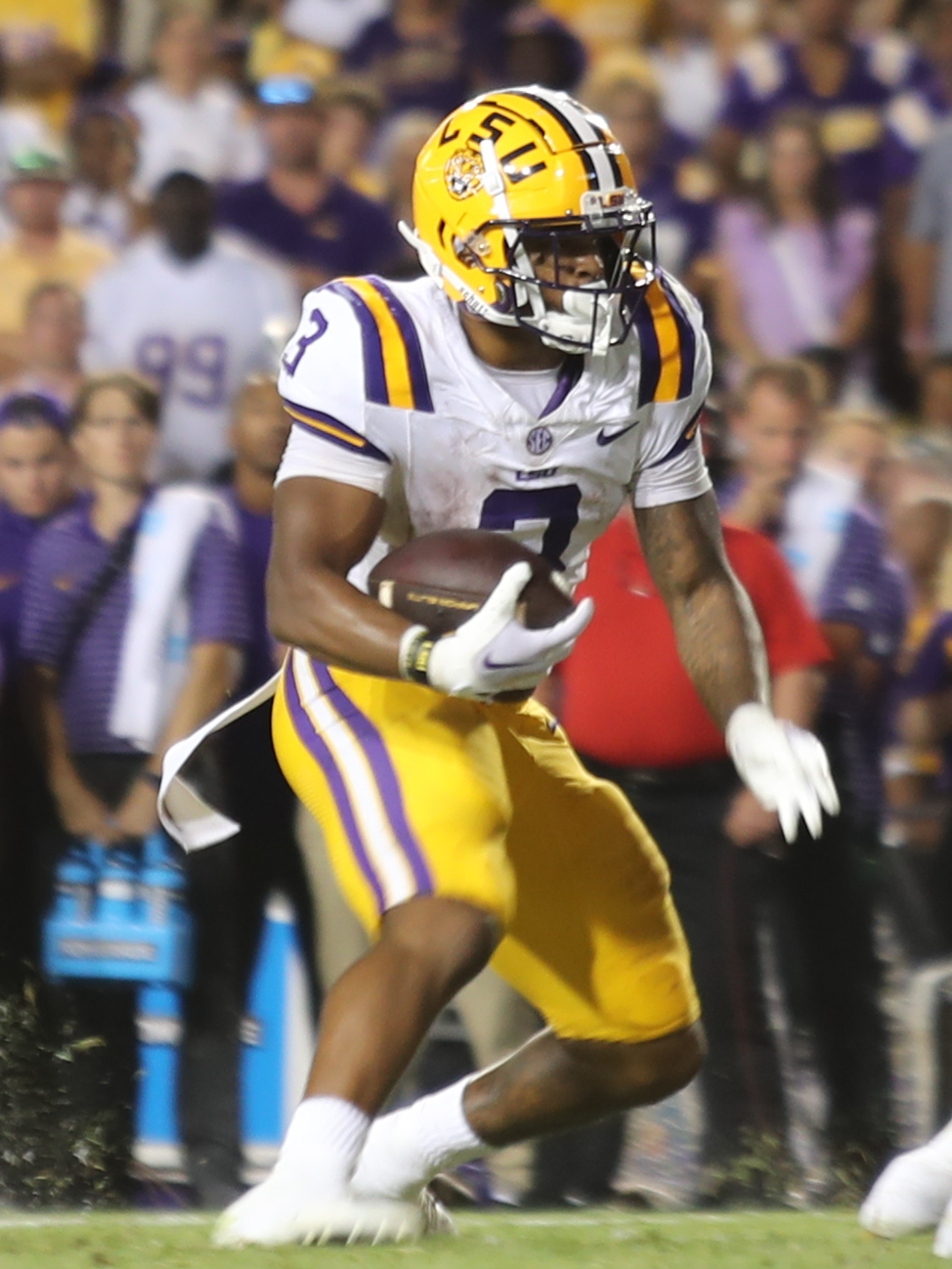
- Diggs in 2023

Profile
- Position: Running back

Personal information
- Born: March 17, 2002 (age 24)
- Listed height: 6 ft 0 in (1.83 m)
- Listed weight: 220 lb (100 kg)

Career information
- High school: Archbishop Rummel (Metairie, Louisiana)
- College: Notre Dame (2021–2022); LSU (2023); Ole Miss (2024–2025)
- Stats at ESPN

Logan Alexander Diggs (born March 17, 2002) is an American former college football running back. He played for the Notre Dame Fighting Irish, LSU Tigers, and Ole Miss Rebels.

== Early life ==
Diggs grew up in Boutte, Louisiana and attended Archbishop Rummel High School where he lettered in football, basketball and track & field. He was rated a three-star recruit and committed to play college football at Notre Dame over offers from schools such as Arizona, Arizona State, Arkansas, Colorado, LSU, Memphis, Michigan State, Nebraska, Oklahoma State, Ole Miss, Southern Miss and USC.

== College career ==
=== Notre Dame ===
As a freshman in 2021, Diggs played in the last eight games where he handed 52 carries for 230 yards and three scores along with six passes for 56 yards and a score. During the 2022 Fiesta Bowl, he made nine rushes for 29 yards and four catches for 21 yards. During the 2022 season, Diggs played in 12 games and finished the season with 821 rushing yards and four touchdowns. During the 2022 Gator Bowl, he finished the game with 170 all-purpose yards while making 13 carries for 89 yards and also made a 75-yard touchdown pass making it the second longest touchdown reception during a bowl game in the program's history.

On April 27, 2023, Diggs announced that he would be entering the transfer portal. On May 16, 2023, he announced that he would be transferring to LSU.

=== LSU ===
During the 2023 season, Diggs started to become one of the top rushers at LSU after the Week 4 game against Arkansas where he completed 97 yards on 14 carries.

=== Statistics ===
Year	Team	GP	Rushing				Receiving			
Year	Team	GP	Att	Yds	Avg	TD	Rec	Yds	Avg	TD
2021	Notre Dame	8	52	230	4.4	3	6	56	9.3	1
2022	Notre Dame	12	165	822	5.0	4	10	211	21.1	2
2023	LSU	10	119	653	5.5	7	8	82	10.3	0
2024	Ole Miss	1	1	15	15.0	0	1	6	6.0	0
2025	Ole Miss	15	33	189	5.7	4	7	56	8.0	0
Career		46	370	1,909	5.2	18	32	411	12.8	3
