= Michael Mayer (American football) =

American football player (born 2001)

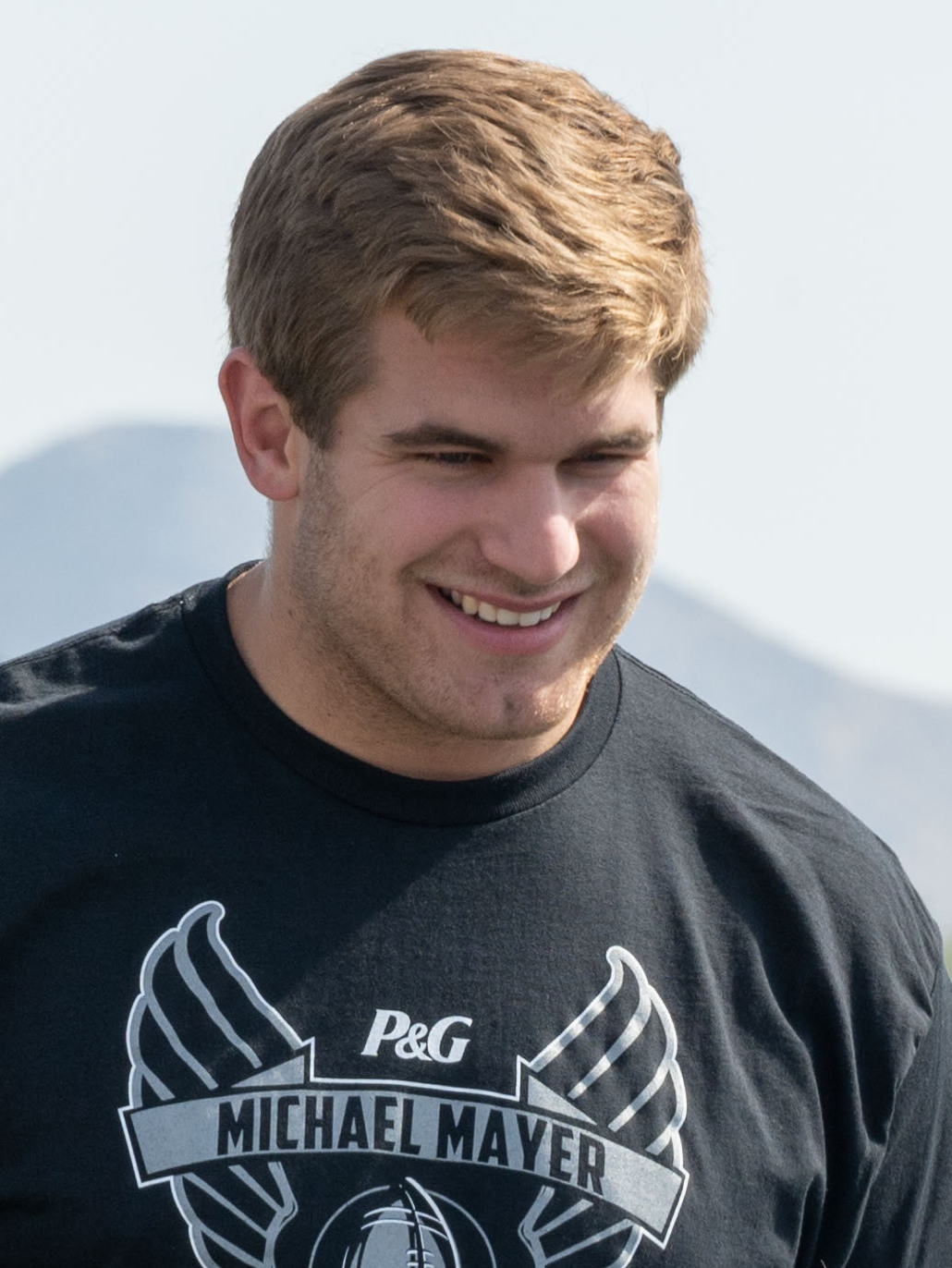
- Mayer in 2023

No. 87 – Las Vegas Raiders
- Position: Tight end
- Roster status: Active

Personal information
- Born: July 6, 2001 (age 25); Independence, Kentucky, U.S.
- Listed height: 6 ft 4 in (1.93 m)
- Listed weight: 256 lb (116 kg)

Career information
- High school: Covington Catholic (Park Hills, Kentucky)
- College: Notre Dame (2020–2022)
- NFL draft: 2023: 2nd round, 35th overall pick

Career history
- Las Vegas Raiders (2023–present)

Awards and highlights
- Consensus All-American (2022); Third-team All-American (2021); Third-team All-ACC (2020)

Career NFL statistics as of Week 9, 2026
- Receptions: 122
- Receiving yards: 1,176
- Receiving touchdowns: 4
- Stats at Pro Football Reference

Michael Richard Mayer (born July 6, 2001) is an American professional football tight end for the Las Vegas Raiders of the National Football League (NFL). He played college football for the Notre Dame Fighting Irish, finishing as their all-time receptions leader at tight end with 180.

== Early life ==
Mayer was born on July 6, 2001, in Independence, Kentucky. He attended Covington Catholic High School in Park Hills, Kentucky. As a senior in 2019, he was the Gatorade Kentucky Football Player of the Year after recording 49 receptions for 970 yards and 15 touchdowns. He was selected to play in the 2020 All-American Bowl. He committed to the University of Notre Dame to play college football.

== College career ==
Mayer was Notre Dame's starting tight end as a freshman in 2020. In 2021, Mayer was named a third-team All-American. In 2022, he surpassed Tyler Eifert to become the school's all-time receptions leader at tight end with over 140 catches. He was named a consensus All-American, the first in program history since Ken MacAfee in 1976.

== Professional career ==
Pre-draft measurables
Height	Weight	Arm length	Hand span	Wingspan	40-yard dash	10-yard split	20-yard split	20-yard shuttle	Three-cone drill	Vertical jump	Broad jump	Bench press
6 ft 4 1/2 in (1.94 m)	249 lb (113 kg)	31 5/8 in (0.80 m)	9 1/2 in (0.24 m)	6 ft 4 1/4 in (1.94 m)	4.70 s	1.66 s	2.75 s	4.44 s	7.26 s	32.5 in (0.83 m)	9 ft 10 in (3.00 m)	21 reps
All values from NFL Combine/Pro Day

The Las Vegas Raiders selected Mayer with the 35th overall pick in the second round of the 2023 NFL draft. In Week 10, he scored his first professional touchdown against the New York Jets. He finished his rookie season with 27 catches for 304 yards and two touchdowns through 14 games and 12 starts. In the 2024 season, he finished with 21 receptions for 156 yards.

In the 2025 season, Mayer set career highs with 35 catches for 328 yards on 50 targets, while scoring the third touchdown of his three-year NFL career.

On September 12, 2026, Mayer signed a three-year, $45 million contract extension with the Raiders.

== Career statistics ==
=== NFL ===
Year	Team	Games		Receiving					Fumbles		Tackles		
Year	Team	GP	GS	Rec	Yds	Avg	Lng	TD	Fum	Lost	Cmb	Solo	Ast
2023	LV	14	12	27	304	11.3	32	2	0	0	1	0	1
2024	LV	11	8	21	156	7.4	29	0	0	0	0	0	0
2025	LV	13	12	35	328	9.4	23	1	1	0	5	4	1
Career		38	32	83	788	9.5	32	3	1	0	6	4	2

=== College ===
Year	Team	Games		Receiving				
Year	Team	GP	GS	Rec	Yds	Avg	Lng	TD
2020	Notre Dame	12	4	42	450	10.7	29	2
2021	Notre Dame	12	12	71	840	11.8	52	7
2022	Notre Dame	12	12	67	809	12.1	37	9
Career		36	28	180	2,099	11.7	52	18

== Personal life ==
Mayer's cousin is Luke Maile, a professional baseball catcher who currently plays in Major League Baseball for the Kansas City Royals organization.
