= Jack Coan =

American football player (born 1998)

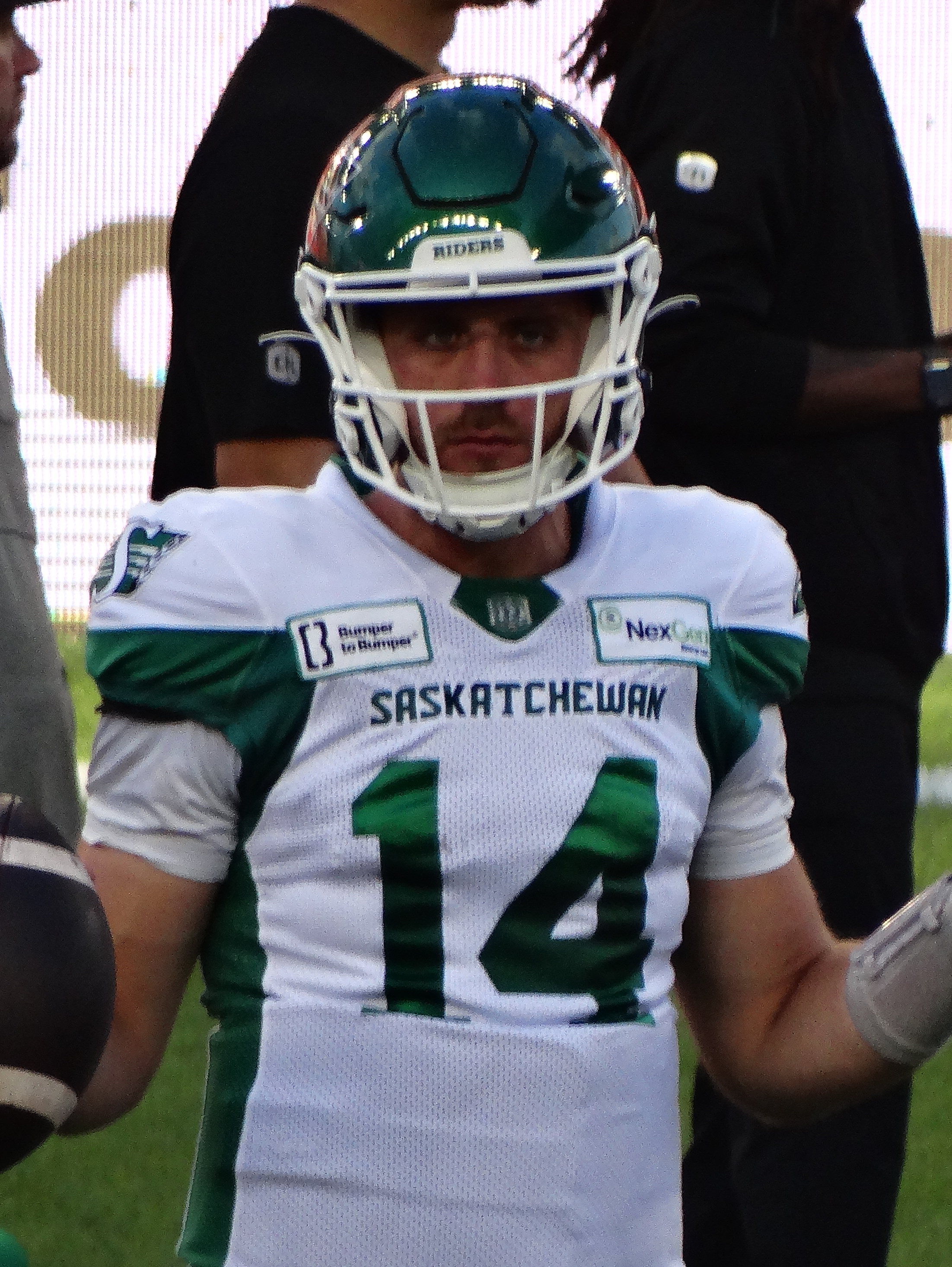
- Coan with the Saskatchewan Roughriders in 2024

No. 14 – Saskatchewan Roughriders
- Position: Quarterback
- Roster status: Active
- CFL status: American

Personal information
- Born: December 8, 1998 (age 27); Sayville, New York, U.S.
- Listed height: 6 ft 3 in (1.91 m)
- Listed weight: 218 lb (99 kg)

Career information
- High school: Sayville
- College: Wisconsin (2017–2020); Notre Dame (2021)
- NFL draft: 2022: undrafted

Career history
- Indianapolis Colts (2022)*; San Antonio Brahmas (2023); Saskatchewan Roughriders (2024–present)
- * Offseason or practice squad member only

Awards and highlights
- Grey Cup champion (2025)

Career XFL statistics
- Pass attempts: 254
- Pass completions: 158
- Completion percentage: 62.2
- TD-INT: 6–6
- Passing yards: 1,471
- Stats at Pro Football Reference

Career CFL statistics as of 2026
- Passing completions: 29
- Passing attempts: 57
- Passing yards: 331
- TD–INT: 1–1
- Passer rating: 67.2
- Rushing yards: 54
- Rushing touchdowns: 3
- Stats at CFL.ca

Jack Christopher Coan (born December 8, 1998) is an American professional football quarterback for the Saskatchewan Roughriders of the Canadian Football League (CFL). He played college football for the Wisconsin Badgers and Notre Dame Fighting Irish.

== Early life and college ==
Born in Sayville, New York, Coan went to Sayville High School, and in 2017 he decided to commit to the University of Wisconsin–Madison to play football. After three seasons Coan was finally the starter for Wisconsin, before suffering an injury that sidelined him for the whole of the 2020 season. He announced his transfer as a graduate student to the University of Notre Dame, where he was subsequently named the starting quarterback. He entered the 2022 NFL draft the following year.

== Professional career ==
Pre-draft measurables
Height	Weight	Arm length	Hand span	Wingspan	40-yard dash	10-yard split	20-yard split	20-yard shuttle	Three-cone drill	Vertical jump	Broad jump
6 ft 3 1/4 in (1.91 m)	218 lb (99 kg)	31 1/8 in (0.79 m)	9 1/2 in (0.24 m)	6 ft 2 7/8 in (1.90 m)	4.90 s	1.67 s	2.80 s	4.39 s	6.95 s	33.0 in (0.84 m)	9 ft 7 in (2.92 m)
All values from NFL Combine

=== Indianapolis Colts ===
Coan signed with the Indianapolis Colts as an undrafted free agent on May 13, 2022. He was waived on August 30, 2022.

=== San Antonio Brahmas ===
On November 17, 2022, Coan was picked up by the San Antonio Brahmas of the XFL after the 2023 XFL draft. He was removed from the roster on February 15, 2024.

=== Saskatchewan Roughriders ===
On March 15, 2024, Coan signed with the Saskatchewan Roughriders of the Canadian Football League (CFL).

Coan signed a contract extension with the Roughriders on January 19, 2026.

== Career statistics ==
=== Professional ===
Year	League	Team	Games			Passing								Rushing			
Year	League	Team	GP	GS	Record	Cmp	Att	Pct	Yds	Avg	TD	Int	Rtg	Att	Yds	Avg	TD
2023	XFL	SA	8	7	2–5	150	242	62.0	1,403	5.8	6	6	75.8	26	108	4.2	0
2024	CFL	SSK	18	0	0–0	10	21	47.6	100	4.8	1	0	77.5	3	14	4.7	0
2025	CFL	SSK	5	0	0–0	2	8	25.0	38	4.8	0	0	46.9	13	40	3.1	3

=== College ===
Year	Team	Games			Passing								Rushing			
Year	Team	GP	GS	Record	Comp	Att	Pct	Yards	Avg	TD	Int	Rate	Att	Yards	Avg	TD
2017	Wisconsin	3	0	—	5	5	100.0	36	7.2	0	0	160.5	0	0	0.0	0
2018	Wisconsin	5	3	2–1	56	93	60.2	515	5.5	5	3	118.0	20	−33	−1.7	1
2019	Wisconsin	14	14	10–4	236	339	69.6	2,727	8.0	18	5	151.8	56	22	0.4	4
2020	Wisconsin	Medical redshirt (redshirt)														
2021	Notre Dame	13	13	11–2	253	386	65.5	3,150	8.2	25	7	151.8	57	−100	−1.8	2
Career		35	30	23–7	550	823	66.8	6,428	7.8	48	15	148.0	133	–111	–0.8	7
