= Kris Budden =

American sports reporter (born 1984)

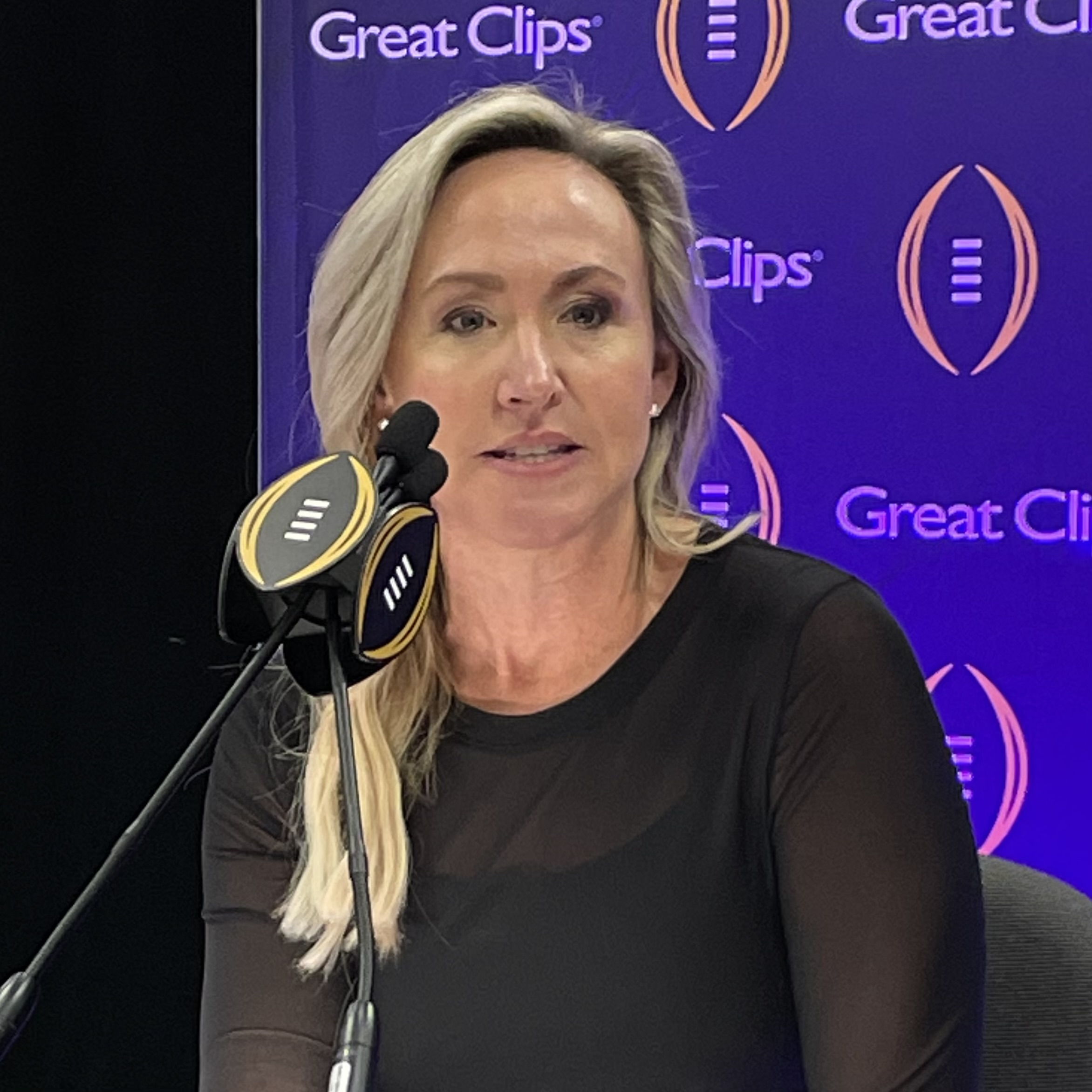
- Budden in 2024
- Born: March 9, 1984 (age 42); Atlanta, Georgia, U.S.
- Education: Missouri School of Journalism
- Occupation: Sports commentator
- Years active: 2007-present
- Employer: ESPN
- Spouse: Mario Toledo (m. 2014)
- Children: 2

Kristen Lee Budden (born March 9, 1984) is an American sports reporter for ESPN. Budden is known for reporting on the San Diego Padres as well as being a sideline reporter for college football, college basketball, and college baseball, as well as being a general assignment reporter during the U.S. Open tennis tournament.

== Background ==
Born in Atlanta, Georgia, on March 9, 1984, Budden moved with her family at age 10 to Dallas, Texas. As a teenager, she shadowed her godfather at his anchor job at WFAA. She attended Trinity Christian Academy, in the Dallas suburb of Addison, where she was a two-time state champion with the school's tennis team. She went on to graduate with honors from University of Missouri's School of Journalism with a broadcast journalism degree.

== Career ==
Budden began her broadcasting career as a sports reporter at WCAV in Charlottesville, Virginia. In 2008, she joined WBIR in Knoxville, Tennessee, as a weekend sports anchor and reporter. She spent six years at WBIR, covering the Tennessee Volunteers' athletics programs and events including the 2012 Summer Olympics, NCAA men's and women's basketball tournaments, and Pat Summitt's retirement. At WBIR, Budden received an Associated Press award for Best Breaking Sports News.

In 2013, Budden joined Fox Sports, where she covered NFL and college football. In 2014, she joined Fox Sports San Diego as a host and sideline reporter for San Diego Padres broadcasts.

Budden later joined ESPN, where she covers college football, basketball, and baseball. She also contributes to ESPN's coverage of the U.S. Open tennis tournament, making her debut on the network's tennis coverage in 2024.

== Awards and honors ==
Budden has received an Associated Press Best Sports Feature Award, and a regional Emmy Award for Best Talent in Sports in 2016.

== Personal life ==
Budden is married to Mario Toledo, who was a member of the University of Tennessee men's tennis team from 2000 to 2002. They met in 2012, when she took a lesson from him at a Knoxville racquet club. They were married in Charleston, South Carolina, in April 2014. During Budden's career covering the Padres, Toledo got a job as the assistant tennis coach at Pepperdine University. The couple then moved to Los Angeles, and she switched to covering college football. She has two children and is based in Frisco, Texas.
