= Curtis Hammeke =

American university sports administrator and college baseball player and coach

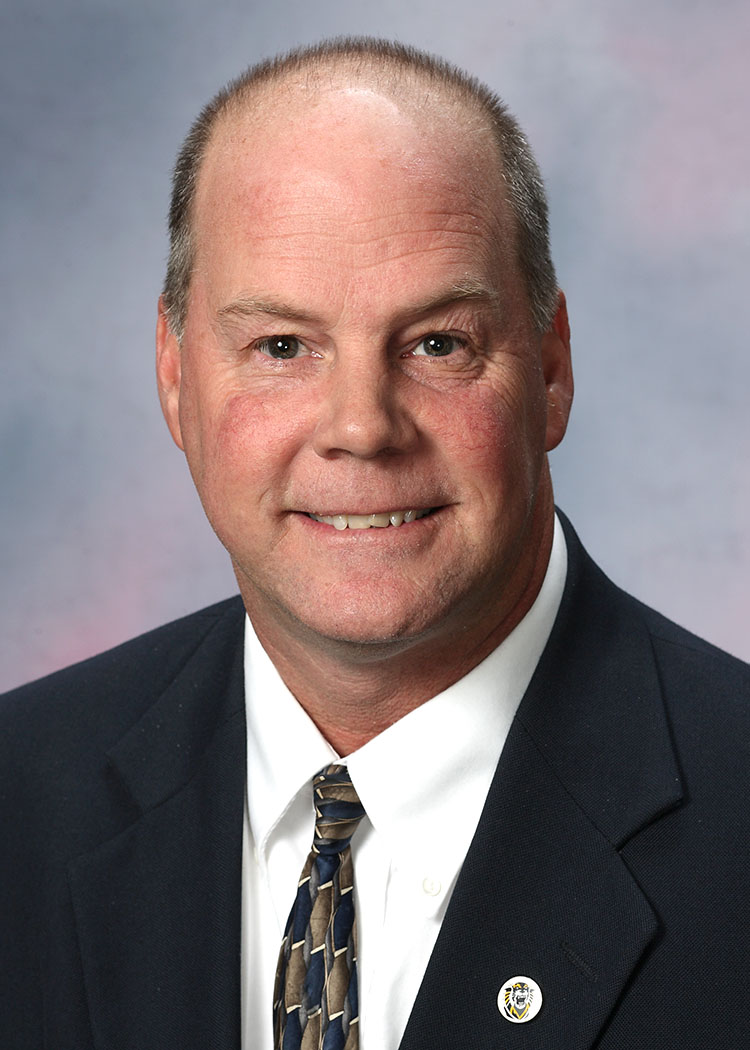

Biographical details
- Born: Great Bend, Kansas

Playing career
- 1981–1982: Barton CC
- 1983–1984: Fort Hays State
- Position: Pitcher

Coaching career (HC unless noted)
- 1987–1991: Barton CC (assistant)
- 1991–1996: Fort Hays State

Administrative career (AD unless noted)
- 1987–1991: Barton CC (media relations)
- 1991–1996: Fort Hays State (assistant AD)
- 1996–1998: Great Bend HS
- 1998–2003: Butler CC
- 2003–2004: Newman (Kansas)
- 2004–2025: Fort Hays State

Head coaching record
- Overall: 164–81 (.669)

Accomplishments and honors

Championships
- RMAC regular season championship (1995); RMAC Tournament championship (1995)

Awards
- 1 Louisville Slugger Coach of the Year (1995); RMAC Coach of the Year (1995)

Curtis J. Hammeke is an American university sports administrator and former college baseball player and coach. Hammeke served as the director of athletics at Fort Hays State University from 2004 to 2025. Prior to his position at Fort Hays State, Hammeke served as an athletic director at a high school and two colleges, as well as the baseball coach for Fort Hays State prior to that.

== Career ==
=== Early career ===
Hammeke, a Great Bend, Kansas native, played baseball for Barton Community College from 1981 to 1982, and finished his collegiate baseball career at Fort Hays State University from 1983 to 1984. Two years after graduating from Fort Hays State, Hammeke began his career in athletics in 1987 as the Barton Cougars baseball assistant coach and Sports Information Director.

=== Fort Hays State University ===
In 1992, Hammeke was hired as the head coach at his alma mater, Fort Hays State Tigers baseball, as well as an assistant athletic director. During his five seasons as the head coach, Hammeke led the Tigers to an overall record of 164–81 (.669), winning the Rocky Mountain Athletic Conference regular season and tournament championships in 1995.

=== Three jobs in eight years ===
Following a successful five seasons as a head coach, Hammeke became the Great Bend High School director of athletics, a position he held from 1996 to 1998. In 1998, Hammeke left his Great Bend to become Butler Community College's director of athletics. Hammeke was responsible for hiring the National Junior College Athletic Association winningest football coach, Troy Morrell, who won three out of seven national championship appearances, and 12 conference championships. In 2003, Hammeke left Butler CC to become the athletics director at Newman University in Wichita, Kansas.

=== Return to Fort Hays State as AD ===
In May, 2004, Hammeke was named Fort Hays State University's athletics director. During his time as the athletic director, Lewis Field Stadium has seen numerous renovations – including an artificial field – along with an indoor training facility. Hammeke has hired several successful coaches at Fort Hays State including head Tiger football coach, Chris Brown, and head women's basketball coach, Tony Hobson.

Hammeke retired in 2025.

== Head coach record ==
Statistics overview
Season	Team	Overall	Conference	Standing	Postseason
Fort Hays State Tigers (Rocky Mountain Athletic Conference) (1992–1996)
1992	Fort Hays State	24–22			
1993	Fort Hays State	34–12			
1994	Fort Hays State	33–18			
1995	Fort Hays State	34–13			
1996	Fort Hays State	39–16			
Fort Hays State:		164–81 (.669)			
Total:		164–81 (.669)			
National champion Postseason invitational champion Conference regular season champion Conference regular season and conference tournament champion Division regular season champion Division regular season and conference tournament champion Conference tournament champion
