= Tornado outbreak sequence of May 15–20, 2017 =

American severe weather event

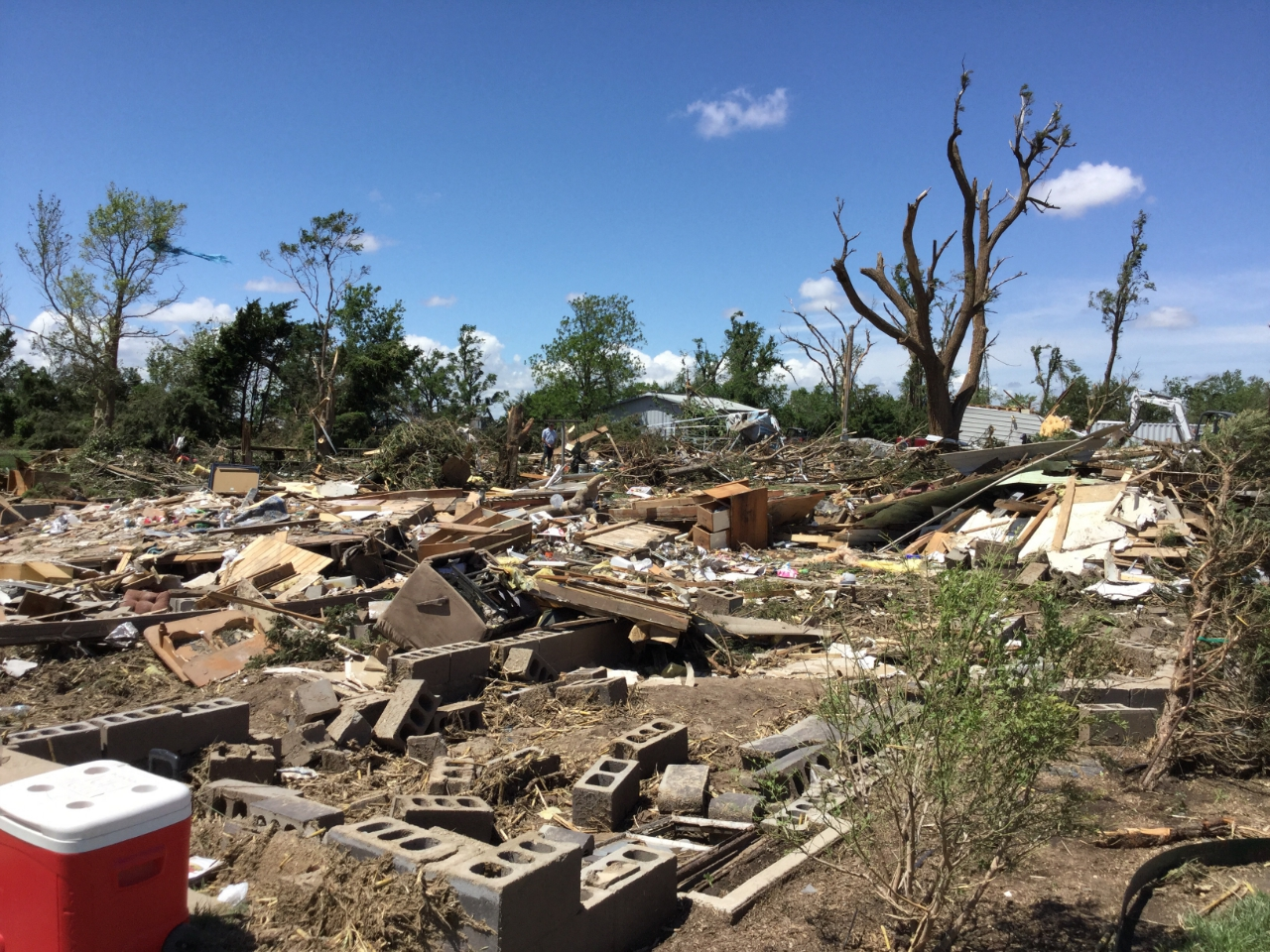
- Remains of a farmhouse that was leveled at high-end EF3 strength near Great Bend, Kansas

Meteorological history
- Formed: May 15, 2017
- Dissipated: May 20, 2017

Tornado outbreak
- Tornadoes: 134
- Max. rating: EF3 tornado
- Duration: 5 days, 1 hour and 1 minute
- Highest winds: Tornadic – 165 mph (266 km/h) (near Great Bend, Kansas on May 16); Non-tornadic – 104 mph (167 km/h) (near Walters, Oklahoma on May 19)
- Largest hail: 4.50 in (11.4 cm) in diameter near Santa Anna, Texas, on May 19

Overall effects
- Fatalities: 2
- Injuries: 39
- Damage: $975 million
- Areas affected: Great Plains, Great Lakes, Ohio Valley
- Part of the tornado outbreaks of 2017

A prolonged period of intense tornado activity affected the Great Plains, Great Lakes, and Ohio Valley during May 15–20, 2017. This outbreak sequence was the most prolific tornado event of 2017 in terms of number of tornadoes. It is also notable for producing the longest-tracked tornado in Wisconsin state history: an intense EF3 tornado that remained on the ground for over 82 miles (132 km) and killed one person while causing major damage near Chetek and Conrath. Overall, the outbreak sequence resulted in two deaths and several injuries.

== Outbreak summary ==
On May 15, a severe weather outbreak struck areas from Northern Illinois to Texas. One EF0 tornado was reported in Iowa along with minor tree damage associated with the tornado. Numerous reports of strong winds and large hail along with some significant hail and wind was reported on May 15. On May 16, a widespread severe weather event impacted a line from Wisconsin to Texas according to storm reports. Many tornadoes, including some long tracked tornadoes, were reported in Texas, Oklahoma, and Kansas. An EF3 tornado which touched down near Reeve, Wisconsin, caused one fatality and 25 injuries along its 83-mile (134 km) long track, making it the longest tracked on record in Wisconsin and the first killer tornado in the state since 2011. Extensive damage occurred in a mobile home park near Chetek, where the fatality occurred, and EF3 strength damage occurred to a poorly built home near Conrath, which was leveled. A large, high-end EF2 tornado also struck the southern fringes of Elk City, Oklahoma, killing one person and causing major damage. An EF3 tornado also damaged houses in Pawnee Rock, Kansas, and completely destroyed farm homes near Great Bend, injuring one person. Hail up to 4 inches (10 cm) in diameter and straight-line winds up to 85 mph (137 km/h) were also reported on May 16. On May 17, individual storm cells began to pop up along a line from Minnesota to Nebraska. The individual storm cells generated a few tornadoes in Iowa, Nebraska, and Minnesota before converging into a squall line. The squall line continued to produce winds of up to 89 mph (143 km/h) in parts of Wisconsin, Iowa, and Illinois before weakening below severe limits. An EF2 tornado embedded in the squall line ripped the roof off of a house and injured one person near Galva, Illinois.

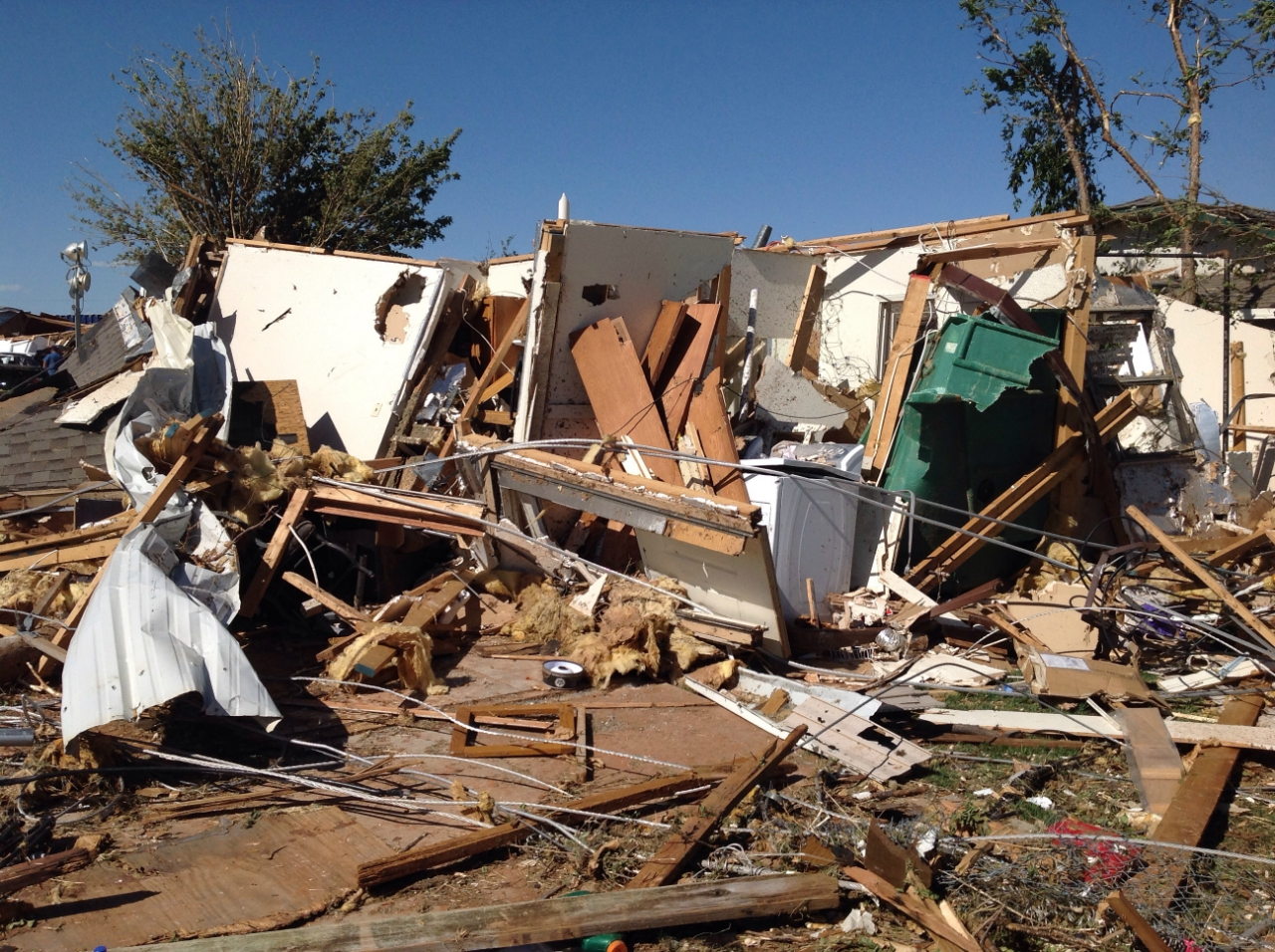
High-end EF2 damage to a home in the southern part of Elk City, Oklahoma

On May 18, a high risk of severe thunderstorms was issued for south-central Kansas and northwestern Oklahoma. The Storm Prediction Center stated that several intense and long-tracked tornadoes, along with hurricane-force winds and hail up to 4 inches in diameter were likely in the high risk area. Also, a 30% risk of tornadoes including significant tornados was issued in the high risk area. In the early afternoon, a line of intense supercells with baseball size hail fired along the dry line near the Texas and Oklahoma panhandle border. A few of these supercells went on to produce multiple scattered, short-lived tornadoes across three different states. Most were weak, though an EF2 tornado crumpled several metal power line truss towers near Haynesville, Texas. Later in the afternoon when the most intense severe weather was forecast to occur, a stationary front set up in northern Kansas lowering temperatures in most of the moderate and high risk areas. This led to insufficient instability and limited the severe weather in southern central Kansas and West central Oklahoma to smaller hail and winds. However, this also created a large plume of heavy precipitation that caused some flash flooding. In addition, the supercell thunderstorms that formed during this event initiated in the early afternoon, well before the best kinematics for tornado development had arrived. Later in the evening, the tornado threat was limited to central Texas and eastern Oklahoma. A large, slow moving high precipitation supercell with softball sized hail set up near Cross Plains, Texas. This storm was tornado warned for over an hour and produced many funnel clouds along with a couple of weak tornadoes. The main threat with this storm, however, was the flash flooding as it dumped close to 8 inches (20 cm) of rain in localized areas due to its very heavy rain and slow movement. A squall line progressed through eastern Oklahoma and Kansas overnight, producing many embedded tornadoes, two of which reached EF2 intensity. One of these EF2 tornadoes struck Muskogee, Oklahoma, causing severe damage to trees, apartment buildings, and industrial buildings. A separate EF1 tornado impacted the western part of Muskogee as well, causing damage to homes and businesses, and downing many trees. The squall line continued into Friday morning, eventually making its way to parts of Arkansas and Missouri, producing numerous additional weak tornadoes. Other storms in states further to the west also produced many EF0 and EF1 tornadoes. On May 20, the severe weather threat generally was limited. However, a few weak tornadoes were spawned in Indiana as plentiful helicity and the presence of a warm front aided the development of tornadoes. Overall, this outbreak sequence produced 134 tornadoes.

== Confirmed tornadoes ==
Confirmed tornadoes by Enhanced Fujita rating
EFU	EF0	EF1	EF2	EF3	EF4	EF5	Total
22	62	41	7	2	0	0	134

=== May 15 event ===
List of reported tornadoes – Monday, May 15, 2017 (Note: All dates are based on the local time zone where the tornado touched down; however, all times are in Coordinated Universal Time for consistency.)
EF#	Location	County / Parish	State	Start Coord.	Time (UTC)	Path length	Max width
EF0	W of Calmar	Winneshiek	IA	43.1806°N 91.9223°W	23:45–23:47	0.98 mi (1.58 km)	50 yd (46 m)
EF0	Surveyors found a broken line of tree damage.						

=== May 16 event ===
List of reported tornadoes – Tuesday, May 16, 2017
EF#	Location	County / Parish	State	Start Coord.	Time (UTC)	Path length	Max width
EF0	NE of Balko	Beaver	OK	36.68°N 100.71°W	19:45–19:46	0.09 mi (0.14 km)	25 yd (23 m)
EF0	Brief tornado remained over open country and caused no damage.						
EF0	NW of Waka	Hansford	TX	36.35°N 101.14°W	20:04–20:05	0.09 mi (0.14 km)	25 yd (23 m)
EF0	Brief tornado remained over open country and caused no damage.						
EF0	SSW of McLean	Donley	TX	35.16°N 100.65°W	21:39–21:50	1.39 mi (2.24 km)	50 yd (46 m)
EF0	Tornado remained over open country and caused no damage.						
EF3	WNW of Reeve to N of Chetek to WSW of Ogema	Polk, Barron, Rusk, Price	WI	45.2529°N 92.1619°W	21:42–00:10	82.53 mi (132.82 km)	1,320 yd (1,210 m)
EF3	1 death – See section on this tornado – There were 25 injuries.						
EF0	NE of Exeter	Fillmore	NE	40.6662°N 97.4305°W	21:43–21:52	1.83 mi (2.95 km)	35 yd (32 m)
EF0	A trained storm spotter observed a landspout tornado. An auger was turned over and some tin was removed from a roof.						
EF0	E of McLean	Wheeler	TX	35.23°N 100.49°W	21:53–21:54	0.06 mi (0.097 km)	25 yd (23 m)
EF0	Brief tornado remained over open country and caused no damage.						
EF1	NNW of Shamrock	Wheeler	TX	35.31°N 100.38°W	22:16–22:17	0.09 mi (0.14 km)	25 yd (23 m)
EF1	A power line and trees were damaged.						
EF2	SE of Wheeler	Wheeler	TX	35.37°N 100.29°W	22:25–22:44	9.18 mi (14.77 km)	1,250 yd (1,140 m)
EF2	Large rain-wrapped wedge tornado. A double-wide mobile home was completely destroyed, with its debris scattered hundreds of yards downwind. Several other structures were damaged, a large number of power poles were snapped off at the base, and numerous trees were snapped or uprooted. A cotton stripper was overturned, and a truck was tossed nearly 200 yards (180 meters). Oil equipment and holding tanks were damaged as well.						
EF0	ESE of Aberdeen	Collingsworth	TX	35.02°N 100.05°W	22:45–22:46	0.29 mi (0.47 km)	25 yd (23 m)
EF0	Brief tornado remained over open country and caused no damage.						
EF1	SE of Minneola	Clark	KS	37.3764°N 100.0012°W	22:49–22:58	4.03 mi (6.49 km)	50 yd (46 m)
EF1	A narrow tornado rolled an RV camper at a storage lot, destroyed an old pole barn, ripped an exterior wall off of a small abandoned house, and tore roof panels off a metal outbuilding.						
EF0	E of Lutie	Collingsworth	TX	35.02°N 100.05°W	22:50–22:51	2.26 mi (3.64 km)	25 yd (23 m)
EF0	Brief tornado remained over open country and caused no damage.						
EFU	S of Erick	Beckham	OK	35.07°N 99.92°W	23:08–23:11	1 mi (1.6 km)	20 yd (18 m)
EFU	The Erick Fire Department, and storm chasers, observed a tornado.						
EF2	SSE of Reydon to WNW of Cheyenne	Roger Mills	OK	35.564°N 99.917°W	23:18–23:30	10.25 mi (16.50 km)	150 yd (140 m)
EF2	This tornado snapped numerous power poles, tore the roof off of a small hotel and a barn, and uprooted trees. A 16-foot grain feeder that was full of grain was overturned.						
EFU	SSE of Erick	Beckham	OK	35.12°N 99.85°W	23:23–23:25	1.13 mi (1.82 km)	50 yd (46 m)
EFU	An NWS employee observed a tornado.						
EF0	WSW of Brandon	Perkins	NE	40.77°N 102.02°W	23:36–23:37	0.1 mi (0.16 km)	20 yd (18 m)
EF0	A brief tornado was observed but caused no damage.						
EF1	NNW of Strong City	Roger Mills	OK	35.75°N 99.69°W	23:45–23:46	0.75 mi (1.21 km)	50 yd (46 m)
EF1	A tree was blown over and a water tank was damaged at a well site.						
EF2	WNW of Carter to Southern Elk City to WSW of Canute	Beckham, Washita	OK	35.2402°N 99.555°W	23:46–00:18	18 mi (29 km)	1,000 yd (910 m)
EF2	1 death – This rain-wrapped wedge tornado caused very high-end EF2 damage as it impacted the southern fringes of Elk City. Many homes at the Elk City Golf & County Club had their roofs ripped off and sustained collapse of some exterior walls. One small home collapsed, and several metal industrial buildings were heavily damaged or destroyed. Numerous vehicles were flipped and tossed, and one man was killed as his pickup truck was thrown 150 yards from a roadway and mangled. Elsewhere along the path, an oil derrick was toppled, several other homes sustained heavy damage, outbuildings were damaged or destroyed, and an irrigation pivot was overturned. Many trees and power poles were snapped along the path. 66 homes were destroyed, while 140 others were damaged. Three businesses were destroyed, and five others were damaged as well. 10 people were injured.						
EF3	E of Larned to NW of Hoisington	Pawnee, Barton	KS	38.1987°N 99.0186°W	00:59–01:41	26.64 mi (42.87 km)	300 yd (270 m)
EF3	This strong tornado struck the town of Pawnee Rock, where a school building sustained considerable damage, trees were snapped, and homes had their roofs ripped off. High-end EF3 damage occurred to the west of Great Bend, where trees were denuded and debarked, a block-foundation farmhouse was completely leveled, and another farmhouse was left with only one corner standing. Several other homes were severely damaged along the path, some sustaining roof and exterior wall loss. Outbuildings were damaged or destroyed, and irrigation pivots were damaged as well. One person was injured.						
EF0	NNE of Parrish	Oneida	WI	45.4706°N 89.3634°W	01:12–01:13	0.33 mi (0.53 km)	175 yd (160 m)
EF0	Several hundred pine trees were uprooted by this brief tornado.						
EF0	NNE of Susank	Barton	KS	38.65°N 98.76°W	01:48–01:50	0.34 mi (0.55 km)	75 yd (69 m)
EF0	Brief tornado remained over open country and caused no damage.						

=== May 17 event ===
List of reported tornadoes – Wednesday, May 17, 2017
EF#	Location	County / Parish	State	Start Coord.	Time (UTC)	Path length	Max width
EF1	NE of Edgar	Clay	NE	40.4516°N 97.9389°W	06:24–06:29	2.19 mi (3.52 km)	50 yd (46 m)
EF1	Two farmsteads received damage to their outbuildings and trees. A few center irrigation pivots were also damaged, and tin was lofted into trees.						
EF0	NE of Alton	Sioux	IA	43.02°N 95.97°W	19:10–19:12	0.02 mi (0.032 km)	10 yd (9.1 m)
EF0	A trained spotter reported a brief touchdown. No damage occurred.						
EF0	W of Matlock	Sioux	IA	43.24°N 95.95°W	19:42–19:44	0.02 mi (0.032 km)	10 yd (9.1 m)
EF0	Tornado reported by a storm chaser. No damage occurred.						
EF1	WNW of Wisner	Cuming	NE	42.0075°N 97.0187°W	20:48–20:50	0.37 mi (0.60 km)	50 yd (46 m)
EF1	A brief tornado damaged crops and destroyed outbuildings. One home sustained minor damage and had one exterior wall bowed out.						
EF0	Plainview	Wabasha	MN	44.1631°N 92.1789°W	21:29–21:30	0.79 mi (1.27 km)	30 yd (27 m)
EF0	Isolated spots of minor damage occurred in town. The back side of a metal shed was blown down, part of roof was blown off of a storage building, and the batting cage at a baseball field was destroyed.						
EF1	W of Pleasant Plain	Jefferson, Washington	IA	41.1453°N 91.9313°W	22:16–22:20	3.22 mi (5.18 km)	25 yd (23 m)
EF1	A small and fast-moving high-end EF1 tornado damaged outbuildings and trees. One outbuilding was completely destroyed with debris strewn downwind.						
EF1	W of North Bend	Trempealeau	WI	44.0965°N 91.192°W	22:21–22:25	1.06 mi (1.71 km)	250 yd (230 m)
EF1	A brief tornado snapped trees and damaged farm buildings.						
EF0	WSW of Illinois City	Rock Island	IL	41.3483°N 91.0521°W	23:04–23:05	0.71 mi (1.14 km)	25 yd (23 m)
EF0	A storm chaser videoed a brief tornado in an open field. No damage occurred.						
EF0	NE of Ridgeway	Winneshiek	IA	43.3512°N 91.9043°W	23:50–23:51	0.2 mi (0.32 km)	30 yd (27 m)
EF0	A brief tornado damaged trees.						
EF0	Elgin	Wabasha	MN	44.1286°N 92.2541°W	00:35–00:36	0.26 mi (0.42 km)	30 yd (27 m)
EF0	A brief tornado caused minor roof shingle and tree damage in Elgin.						
EF1	NE of Washington	Washington	IA	41.3838°N 91.6021°W	00:36–00:42	5.95 mi (9.58 km)	40 yd (37 m)
EF1	A small, fast-moving tornado damaged or destroyed numerous outbuildings. Trees were snapped, power lines were downed, and a house had its windows blown out.						
EF1	NW of Donahue	Scott	IA	41.7003°N 90.7228°W	01:44–01:46	2.14 mi (3.44 km)	25 yd (23 m)
EF1	Numerous trees were damaged, including a few rotten trees that were snapped. A home and a garage sustained roof damage.						
EF1	SE of Sherrard	Mercer, Henry	IL	41.2447°N 90.5062°W	02:00–02:09	8.11 mi (13.05 km)	150 yd (140 m)
EF1	Numerous outbuildings, a few homes, and over 50 trees sustained damage. One home had partial roof loss, and debris was speared through the walls of another home.						
EF1	WNW of Hooppole	Henry	IL	41.5468°N 89.9994°W	02:44–02:47	2.06 mi (3.32 km)	50 yd (46 m)
EF1	Damage was primarily confined to snapped branches and uprooted trees, though one outbuilding suffered roof damage.						
EF2	SSW of Galva	Henry	IL	41.1533°N 90.0811°W	03:20–03:21	1.29 mi (2.08 km)	50 yd (46 m)
EF2	A small multiple-vortex tornado tore the roof off a home and blew out the structures doors, injuring one inside. Multiple trees and another home were also damaged.						
EF1	S of Poplar Grove to NW of Harvard	Boone, McHenry	IL	42.3341°N 88.8221°W	03:21–03:34	10.3 mi (16.6 km)	100 yd (91 m)
EF1	A large outbuilding was destroyed and others were damaged. Numerous trees were snapped and uprooted, and a garage collapsed.						

=== May 18 event ===
List of reported tornadoes – Thursday, May 18, 2017
EF#	Location	County / Parish	State	Start Coord.	Time (UTC)	Path length	Max width
EFU	NW of Duke	Jackson	OK	34.677°N 99.594°W	19:02–19:05	0.7 mi (1.1 km)	50 yd (46 m)
EFU	A brief tornado was reported by local media. No damage occurred.						
EF0	N of Duke	Jackson	OK	34.695°N 99.575°W	19:11–19:16	1.2 mi (1.9 km)	75 yd (69 m)
EF0	Large cone tornado remained mainly over open country, though one house sustained light damage.						
EFU	NE of Delhi	Otero	CO	37.7113°N 103.8885°W	20:29–20:36	2.88 mi (4.63 km)	75 yd (69 m)
EFU	Storm chasers and an off-duty NWS employee observed a tornado which caused no damage.						
EFU	NNW of Cloud Chief	Washita	OK	35.287°N 98.859°W	20:40–20:41	0.5 mi (0.80 km)	100 yd (91 m)
EFU	Tornado remained over open country and caused no damage.						
EF0	S of Seward	Stafford	KS	38.158°N 98.799°W	21:03–21:04	0.58 mi (0.93 km)	50 yd (46 m)
EF0	Weak, brief tornado remained over open country and caused no damage.						
EFU	S of Vernon	Wilbarger	TX	34.054°N 99.282°W	21:04	0.2 mi (0.32 km)	50 yd (46 m)
EFU	Tornado remained over open country and caused no damage.						
EFU	WSW of Seiling	Dewey	OK	36.127°N 99.022°W	21:11	0.2 mi (0.32 km)	50 yd (46 m)
EFU	Tornado remained over open country and caused no damage.						
EF0	NW of Bloom	Ford	KS	37.5154°N 99.9445°W	21:14–21:18	0.49 mi (0.79 km)	50 yd (46 m)
EF0	Landspout tornado remained over open country and caused no damage.						
EF0	S of Wilroads	Ford	KS	37.5904°N 99.8839°W	21:18–21:21	0.35 mi (0.56 km)	50 yd (46 m)
EF0	Landspout tornado developed as the previous one was dissipating. No damage occurred.						
EFU	SE of Weatherford	Custer	OK	35.5095°N 98.6749°W	21:20	0.2 mi (0.32 km)	30 yd (27 m)
EFU	Tornado remained over open country and caused no damage.						
EF0	NW of Chester	Woodward, Major	OK	36.226°N 98.974°W	21:23–21:36	8.6 mi (13.8 km)	200 yd (180 m)
EF0	Large multiple-vortex tornado caused roof and siding damage to two homes. Tree damage also occurred.						
EF0	E of Great Bend Municipal Airport	Barton	KS	38.35°N 98.82°W	21:30–21:31	0.11 mi (0.18 km)	50 yd (46 m)
EF0	A brief tornado touched down over open fields. No damage occurred.						
EF0	SW of Greenfield	Blaine	OK	35.58°N 98.626°W	21:33	0.2 mi (0.32 km)	50 yd (46 m)
EF0	An outbuilding and the roof of a house were damaged.						
EF0	NNE of Seward	Stafford	KS	38.238°N 98.769°W	21:33–21:34	0.56 mi (0.90 km)	50 yd (46 m)
EF0	Weak, brief tornado remained over open country and caused no damage.						
EFU	N of Chester	Major	OK	36.3647°N 98.92°W	21:37	0.2 mi (0.32 km)	30 yd (27 m)
EFU	A brief tornado was reported by local media. No damage occurred.						
EFU	SW of Corn	Washita	OK	35.309°N 98.846°W	21:40	0.3 mi (0.48 km)	50 yd (46 m)
EFU	Tornado remained over open country and caused no damage.						
EFU	NNW of Haynesville	Wichita	TX	34.121°N 98.929°W	21:48–21:50	1.2 mi (1.9 km)	50 yd (46 m)
EFU	Tornado remained over open country and caused no damage.						
EF1	WSW of Waynoka	Major, Woods	OK	36.435°N 98.928°W	21:49–22:07	9 mi (14 km)	200 yd (180 m)
EF1	Tornado mainly moved over rural areas, though the roof of a barn was damaged at one location.						
EF2	NNW of Haynesville	Wichita	TX	34.133°N 98.894°W	21:54–21:58	2 mi (3.2 km)	100 yd (91 m)
EF2	Tornado damaged several metal power line truss towers, a few of which completely collapsed.						
EFU	NW of Alva	Woods	OK	36.85°N 98.695°W	21:57	0.2 mi (0.32 km)	50 yd (46 m)
EFU	Tornado remained over open country and caused no damage.						
EF0	ESE of Greenfield	Canadian, Blaine	OK	35.6965°N 98.3128°W	22:05–22:10	3.42 mi (5.50 km)	50 yd (46 m)
EF0	Homes sustained roof, siding, and shingle damage. A power pole was broken and an irrigation pivot was overturned. Two barns also sustained damage.						
EF0	N of Great Bend Municipal Airport	Barton	KS	38.39°N 98.85°W	22:23–22:24	0.21 mi (0.34 km)	50 yd (46 m)
EF0	A brief tornado touched down over open fields. No damage occurred.						
EF0	NE of Great Bend Municipal Airport	Barton	KS	38.38°N 98.83°W	22:49–22:51	0.62 mi (1.00 km)	50 yd (46 m)
EF0	A brief tornado touched down over open fields. No damage occurred.						
EF0	SE of Alta Vista	Wabaunsee	KS	38.8495°N 96.4537°W	22:52	0.01 mi (0.016 km)	25 yd (23 m)
EF0	A brief tornado touched down over an open field. No damage occurred.						
EF0	W of Salina Regional Airport	Saline	KS	38.8°N 97.67°W	23:31–23:33	0.34 mi (0.55 km)	50 yd (46 m)
EF0	A rain-wrapped tornado remained over open fields. No damage occurred.						
EF0	W of Duncan	Stephens	OK	34.4619°N 98.0483°W	00:00	0.2 mi (0.32 km)	50 yd (46 m)
EF0	An outbuilding and some trees were damaged.						
EF1	SE of Cross Plains	Brown	TX	32.0353°N 99.1185°W	00:41–00:55	3.3 mi (5.3 km)	450 yd (410 m)
EF1	A home had roof decking lifted off, small sheds were destroyed, and metal roof panels were lifted off of barns. Numerous tree limbs and some tree trunks were snapped, and debris was blown over 250 yards (230 m).						
EF0	SE of May	Brown	TX	32.011°N 98.9605°W	01:04–01:06	0.42 mi (0.68 km)	50 yd (46 m)
EF0	Brief tornado remained over open country and caused no damage.						
EF1	SE of May	Brown	TX	31.942°N 98.8591°W	01:38–02:00	4.36 mi (7.02 km)	880 yd (800 m)
EF1	A mobile home's roof was torn off, a chicken coop was destroyed, and sheet metal was ripped off of a barn and tossed over 100 yards (91 m). Trees were uprooted, snapped, or had branches snapped, and outdoor lawn furniture was damaged.						
EF0	Stonewall	Pontotoc	OK	34.65°N 96.5306°W	02:13–02:14	0.6 mi (0.97 km)	75 yd (69 m)
EF0	Roof and tree damage occurred in town.						
EF1	ENE of Rocky to SSW of Cloud Chief	Washita	OK	35.195°N 98.971°W	02:29–02:37	6.05 mi (9.74 km)	100 yd (91 m)
EF1	A barn was destroyed and numerous trees and power lines were downed.						
EF1	NE of Ashland	Pittsburg	OK	34.8051°N 96.0686°W	02:46–02:54	8.2 mi (13.2 km)	1,000 yd (910 m)
EF1	Power poles and numerous trees were snapped by this large wedge tornado. An outbuilding and a home were damaged as well.						
EF1	NW of Savanna	Pittsburg	OK	34.8403°N 95.9151°W	02:56–03:02	4.6 mi (7.4 km)	1,000 yd (910 m)
EF1	Numerous trees were snapped or uprooted by this large wedge tornado.						
EF2	NW of Hanna to SSW of Stidham	McIntosh	OK	35.2461°N 95.95°W	02:57–03:09	13.7 mi (22.0 km)	850 yd (780 m)
EF2	A large outbuilding was destroyed, numerous trees were snapped or uprooted, a home was damaged, and a metal high-voltage truss tower was toppled.						
EF1	SW of Stidham to Lake Eufaula	McIntosh	OK	35.3578°N 95.7225°W	03:11–03:15	4.7 mi (7.6 km)	500 yd (460 m)
EF1	A mobile home and outbuildings were destroyed, several homes had their roofs damaged, power poles were toppled, and numerous trees were snapped or uprooted.						
EF1	ENE of Stidham	McIntosh	OK	35.3761°N 95.6591°W	03:15–03:19	3.8 mi (6.1 km)	450 yd (410 m)
EF1	An outbuilding was destroyed, a home was damaged, numerous trees were snapped or uprooted, and power poles were blown down.						
EF1	E of Checotah	McIntosh	OK	35.4664°N 95.4911°W	03:25–03:32	8.8 mi (14.2 km)	600 yd (550 m)
EF1	Privacy fences were downed, homes were damaged, and trees were snapped or outbuildings. Outbuildings were damaged or destroyed and power poles were toppled.						
EF1	S of Redbird	Wagoner	OK	35.7882°N 95.6194°W	03:30–03:36	5 mi (8.0 km)	500 yd (460 m)
EF1	A center pivot irrigation system was destroyed and several power poles and trees were snapped.						
EF1	SW of Braggs	Muskogee	OK	35.5643°N 95.3315°W	03:35–03:40	5.3 mi (8.5 km)	900 yd (820 m)
EF1	Numerous trees were snapped or uprooted, outbuildings were damaged, and power poles were toppled.						
EF1	Western Muskogee	Muskogee	OK	35.7300°N 95.4173°W	03:37–03:39	2 mi (3.2 km)	400 yd (370 m)
EF1	This tornado began at the Eagle Crest Golf Club and moved into the western part of Muskogee. Several homes in town were damaged and numerous trees were snapped or uprooted. Windows were broken at a hotel, and a business had part of its roof peeled back.						
EF1	SSW of Porter to Western Wagoner	Wagoner	OK	35.8548°N 95.5275°W	03:39–03:52	10.3 mi (16.6 km)	700 yd (640 m)
EF1	Homes were damaged, mobile homes and RV campers were rolled, outbuildings were destroyed, power poles were blown down, and trees were snapped or uprooted. Minor tree limb damage occurred in the western part of Wagoner before the tornado dissipated.						
EF2	Northern Muskogee	Muskogee	OK	35.7583°N 95.3846°W	03:40–03:43	2.8 mi (4.5 km)	400 yd (370 m)
EF2	This strong tornado moved through the northern part of Muskogee, causing extensive damage. Many trees were snapped and uprooted, a metal-frame industrial building was completely destroyed, large apartment buildings had their roofs torn off, and homes sustained lesser damage. A strip mall sustained damage and had windows blown out, power poles were snapped, and outbuilding structures were destroyed as well.						
EF1	SW of Braggs	Muskogee	OK	35.6183°N 95.2472°W	03:41–03:45	3.7 mi (6.0 km)	350 yd (320 m)
EF1	Trees were uprooted and numerous large limbs were snapped, outbuildings were damaged, and power poles were downed.						
EF1	W of Fort Gibson to NNW of Hulbert	Muskogee, Wagoner, Cherokee	OK	35.8073°N 95.3392°W	03:45–03:59	16.6 mi (26.7 km)	650 yd (590 m)
EF1	A tornado snapped or uprooted numerous trees along its path.						
EF1	SE of Wagoner to SE of Chouteau	Wagoner, Mayes	OK	35.9150°N 95.3299°W	03:48–04:05	12.7 mi (20.4 km)	650 yd (590 m)
EF1	Homes were damaged, several boats docks were destroyed on the shore of Fort Gibson Lake, and outbuildings were destroyed. Numerous trees were snapped or uprooted along the path.						
EF1	SW of Peggs	Cherokee, Mayes	OK	36.0169°N 95.1727°W	04:01–04:07	5.8 mi (9.3 km)	800 yd (730 m)
EF1	A tornado snapped or uprooted numerous trees.						

=== May 19 event ===
List of reported tornadoes – Friday, May 19, 2017
EF#	Location	County / Parish	State	Start Coord.	Time (UTC)	Path length	Max width
EF0	SW of Bentonville	Benton	AR	36.3207°N 94.2529°W	05:07–05:09	2 mi (3.2 km)	225 yd (206 m)
EF0	A number of homes sustained roof damage, numerous large tree limbs were snapped, and several power poles were downed.						
EF1	E of Jane	McDonald	MO	36.5036°N 94.2079°W	05:23–05:25	1 mi (1.6 km)	100 yd (91 m)
EF1	A brief tornado snapped or uprooted numerous trees. Multiple homes suffered roof damage and/or had windows blown out. One home lost half of its roof.						
EF0	SE of Shell Knob	Barry	MO	36.5972°N 93.5985°W	06:04–06:05	0.12 mi (0.19 km)	100 yd (91 m)
EF0	A brief tornado damaged multiple docks and uprooted trees.						
EF0	Western Branson	Taney	MO	36.6429°N 93.265°W	06:28–06:29	0.25 mi (0.40 km)	75 yd (69 m)
EF0	A brief tornado damaged a hotel and an outlet mall, injuring one person.						
EF1	Rockaway Beach to N of Taneyville	Taney	MO	36.6995°N 93.1595°W	06:30–06:40	8.7 mi (14.0 km)	200 yd (180 m)
EF1	Numerous trees were uprooted along the path.						
EF0	Turners	Greene	MO	37.1726°N 93.1647°W	06:54–06:56	2.49 mi (4.01 km)	200 yd (180 m)
EF0	Numerous trees were uprooted in Turners, some of which fell on homes.						
EF0	Chadwick	Christian	MO	36.9149°N 93.0654°W	07:00–07:03	3 mi (4.8 km)	500 yd (460 m)
EF0	Numerous trees were uprooted in Chadwick, some of which fell on homes.						
EF1	Forkners Hill	Webster	MO	37.4683°N 92.9169°W	07:15–07:17	2 mi (3.2 km)	300 yd (270 m)
EF1	Several structures and homes sustained minor or moderate damage, an outbuilding was destroyed, and numerous trees were snapped or uprooted.						
EF0	N of Dawson	Wright	MO	37.27°N 92.31°W	08:00–08:01	0.25 mi (0.40 km)	50 yd (46 m)
EF0	Roof damage occurred to one residence and large tree limbs were broken.						
EF0	Northeastern Thayer	Oregon	MO	36.5307°N 91.544°W	08:12–08:13	0.75 mi (1.21 km)	300 yd (270 m)
EF0	Numerous trees were damaged and uprooted. Some homes were damaged.						
EF1	E of Williamsburg	Callaway	MO	38.9166°N 91.6829°W	09:15–09:16	1.58 mi (2.54 km)	50 yd (46 m)
EF1	A barn was destroyed while two others were damaged. Two vehicles were flipped, a power pole was snapped, and some debris was tossed nearly a mile downwind.						
EF0	E of New Florence	Montgomery	MO	38.8952°N 91.4450°W	09:23–09:28	3.98 mi (6.41 km)	75 yd (69 m)
EF0	Two buildings at a Missouri Department of Transportation location were damaged, while 12 garage doors were also removed. The material was tossed into power lines, causing one power pole to snap. A home had its garage door damaged and porch pillars shifted off the foundation. Three barns sustained roof and door damage.						
EF1	NE of Hart	McDonald, Newton	MO	36.76°N 94.56°W	19:55–19:57	2.03 mi (3.27 km)	10 yd (9.1 m)
EF1	A home and several outbuildings sustained roof damage and trees were uprooted.						
EF1	Northern Neosho	Newton	MO	36.8732°N 94.376°W	20:10–20:14	4.1 mi (6.6 km)	300 yd (270 m)
EF1	Tornado touched down in the northern part of Neosho and moved northeast. Numerous trees were damaged, some of which were snapped or uprooted. A few homes were damaged as well.						
EF1	SW of Sulphur	Crawford	IN	38.217°N 86.493°W	20:22–20:24	0.23 mi (0.37 km)	50 yd (46 m)
EF1	An old RV had its roof removed, with debris thrown up to 100 yards (91 m), another RV was tipped over, and the bed of a pickup truck, which was not attached, was thrown about 150 yards (140 m). A barn had one of its doors blown out and suffered significant roof damage, with debris thrown 125 yards (114 m) into the auto body shop parking lot, and a single-wide trailer sustained roof damage. An auto body shop sustained roof damage, vehicles in the parking lot had several windows smashed by debris, and trees were knocked down or snapped.						
EFU	NW of Winters	Runnels	TX	31.97°N 99.99°W	20:23–20:25	0.03 mi (0.048 km)	30 yd (27 m)
EFU	Thin rope tornado remained over open country and caused no damage.						
EF0	WSW of Medicine Lodge	Barber	KS	37.24°N 98.682°W	20:37–20:40	0.38 mi (0.61 km)	50 yd (46 m)
EF0	Tornado remained mainly over open country. Some minor tree damage may have occurred, but survey crews were unable to access affected areas.						
EF1	SE of Stotts City	Lawrence	MO	37.0546°N 93.9592°W	20:42–20:46	4.23 mi (6.81 km)	300 yd (270 m)
EF1	Multiple large barns were damaged or destroyed, a couple of outbuildings were damaged, and several trees were uprooted. A car was blown off of the interstate and had a piece of wood driven through its windshield.						
EF0	NNW of Medicine Lodge	Barber	KS	37.328°N 98.617°W	20:53–21:00	2.98 mi (4.80 km)	150 yd (140 m)
EF0	This tornado appeared to be fairly strong, and may have caused tree damage. However, damage surveyors were unable to access the affected areas.						
EF0	Northwestern Miller	Lawrence	MO	37.2173°N 93.8474°W	20:57–20:58	1 mi (1.6 km)	100 yd (91 m)
EF0	The town baseball stadium was damaged, and trees were uprooted or had branches broken off.						
EF0	SE of Everton	Dade	MO	37.2993°N 93.6678°W	21:05–21:06	0.86 mi (1.38 km)	100 yd (91 m)
EF0	Trees were uprooted.						
EF0	NE of Sawyer	Pratt	KS	37.524°N 98.651°W	21:11–21:16	2.22 mi (3.57 km)	50 yd (46 m)
EF0	Tornado remained over open country, causing no damage.						
EF0	NE of Everton	Dade	MO	37.3545°N 93.675°W	21:12–21:13	0.47 mi (0.76 km)	75 yd (69 m)
EF0	Several trees were uprooted.						
EF0	ESE of Isabel to SSE of Cairo	Barber, Pratt	KS	37.466°N 98.536°W	21:14–21:24	4.5 mi (7.2 km)	75 yd (69 m)
EF0	Weak tornado remained over open country and caused no damage.						
EF0	WNW of Walnut Grove	Greene, Polk	MO	37.4219°N 93.5928°W	21:19–21:20	0.58 mi (0.93 km)	100 yd (91 m)
EF0	Several trees were uprooted and an outbuilding sustained roof damage.						
EF0	N of Nashville	Kingman	KS	37.54°N 98.42°W	21:22–21:23	0.21 mi (0.34 km)	50 yd (46 m)
EF0	Brief tornado over an open field. No damage occurred.						
EF0	N of Zenda	Kingman	KS	37.4666°N 98.2811°W	21:53–21:54	0.32 mi (0.51 km)	50 yd (46 m)
EF0	Brief tornado damaged the roof of a metal barn.						
EF0	N of Kingman	Kingman	KS	37.68°N 98.11°W	22:10–22:12	0.31 mi (0.50 km)	50 yd (46 m)
EF0	Brief tornado over an open field. Damage occurred.						
EF0	ESE of Pretty Prairie	Reno	KS	37.75°N 97.94°W	22:32–22:34	0.68 mi (1.09 km)	50 yd (46 m)
EF0	Brief tornado over an open field. No damage occurred.						
EF0	E of Pretty Prairie	Reno	KS	37.6839°N 97.8442°W	22:37–22:39	0.64 mi (1.03 km)	50 yd (46 m)
EF0	Brief tornado over an open field. No damage occurred.						
EFU	SW of Windthorst	Archer	TX	33.549°N 98.467°W	23:00–23:02	0.68 mi (1.09 km)	50 yd (46 m)
EFU	Tornado remained over open country and caused no damage.						
EF1	Northern Wardsville	Cole	MO	38.4982°N 92.1846°W	23:27–23:29	0.95 mi (1.53 km)	75 yd (69 m)
EF1	One home sustained significant roof damage, another sustained minor roof damage, and two large trees fell on a third home. Trees were damaged, some of which were snapped or uprooted.						
EF0	SSW of Bala	Clay	KS	39.2557°N 96.9901°W	00:15–00:16	0.02 mi (0.032 km)	20 yd (18 m)
EF0	Brief tornado caused minor tree damage.						
EFU	W of Springer	Carter	OK	34.31°N 97.2101°W	00:22	0.2 mi (0.32 km)	50 yd (46 m)
EFU	Tornado remained over open country and caused no damage.						
EFU	WNW of Springer	Carter	OK	34.3322°N 97.2048°W	00:24	0.2 mi (0.32 km)	50 yd (46 m)
EFU	Tornado remained over open country and caused no damage.						
EF0	WSW of Trickham	Coleman	TX	31.5601°N 99.2855°W	00:27–00:29	0.08 mi (0.13 km)	25 yd (23 m)
EF0	Tornado briefly kicked up debris but caused no noticeable damage.						
EFU	NNW of Springer	Carter	OK	34.3501°N 97.1601°W	00:31–00:33	0.2 mi (0.32 km)	50 yd (46 m)
EFU	Tornado remained over open country and caused no damage.						
EFU	NNE of Springer	Carter	OK	34.3635°N 97.1132°W	00:47–00:50	2 mi (3.2 km)	400 yd (370 m)
EFU	Tornado remained over open country and caused no damage.						
EF0	WNW of Strong City	Chase	KS	38.4°N 96.58°W	00:48–00:49	0.21 mi (0.34 km)	50 yd (46 m)
EF0	Brief tornado over an open field. No damage occurred.						
EF0	W of Dunlap	Morris	KS	38.58°N 96.4626°W	01:09	0.01 mi (0.016 km)	25 yd (23 m)
EF0	Rope tornado remained over open country. No damage occurred.						
EF1	WNW of Elmdale	Chase	KS	38.411°N 96.789°W	01:25–01:36	0.8 mi (1.3 km)	60 yd (55 m)
EF1	A machine shed and concrete footings were lifted and thrown into a nearby tree and a few cemetery headstones were moved slightly. A large tree was split down the middle, many large tree branches were snapped, and other minor tree damage occurred.						
EF0	NW of Bushong	Lyon	KS	38.6602°N 96.2631°W	01:38	0.01 mi (0.016 km)	25 yd (23 m)
EF0	Tornado remained over open country and caused no damage.						
EFU	NW of Tishomingo	Johnston	OK	34.267°N 96.701°W	02:32–02:34	1.5 mi (2.4 km)	50 yd (46 m)
EFU	Tornado remained over open country and caused no damage.						
EFU	SW of Bromide	Johnston	OK	34.3381°N 96.5992°W	02:44–02:49	2 mi (3.2 km)	50 yd (46 m)
EFU	Tornado remained over open country and caused no damage.						
EFU	NNW of Milburn to SW of Bromide	Johnston	OK	34.347°N 96.6036°W	02:56–03:08	6 mi (9.7 km)	50 yd (46 m)
EFU	Tornado remained over open country and caused no damage.						
EFU	NE of Bromide	Coal	OK	34.4251°N 96.4838°W	03:13–03:20	3 mi (4.8 km)	50 yd (46 m)
EFU	Tornado remained over open country and caused no damage.						

=== May 20 event ===
List of reported tornadoes – Saturday, May 20, 2017
EF#	Location	County / Parish	State	Start Coord.	Time (UTC)	Path length	Max width
EF1	SE of Wirt	Jefferson	IN	38.7890°N 85.426°W	23:10–23:11	0.16 mi (0.26 km)	30 yd (27 m)
EF1	An abandoned farm house was damaged, a house was covered by falling trees, and a camper was rolled three times and destroyed. Trees were snapped and uprooted as well. The inflow winds into the tornado pulled siding off of homes and moved light objects several hundred feet.						
EF0	SSW of Wolcott	Benton, White	IN	40.6566°N 87.0997°W	23:34–23:39	1.22 mi (1.96 km)	50 yd (46 m)
EF0	A small building was knocked down, a small boat on a trailer was flipped, and a small tree was uprooted.						
EF1	W of Thorntown	Boone	IN	40.134°N 86.6956°W	23:40–23:41	0.08 mi (0.13 km)	40 yd (37 m)
EF1	Brief tornado removed a large portion of a barn's roof and tossed it several hundred yards into a field.						
EF1	Forest	Clinton	IN	40.3602°N 86.3514°W	00:40–00:46	1.45 mi (2.33 km)	40 yd (37 m)
EF1	One wall of the Forest volunteer fire station was collapsed and the roof was uplifted, a pole barn had its roof uplifted and its walls partially collapsed, a residence sustained minor roof damage, and trees were uprooted.						

=== Chetek–Conrath, Wisconsin ===
Chetek–Conrath, Wisconsin
- The rain-wrapped tornado near Chetek, Wisconsin.

EF3 tornado
- on the Enhanced Fujita scale
- Highest winds: 142 mph (229 km/h)

Overall effects
- Fatalities: 1
- Injuries: 25
- Damage: $10.52 million (2017 USD)

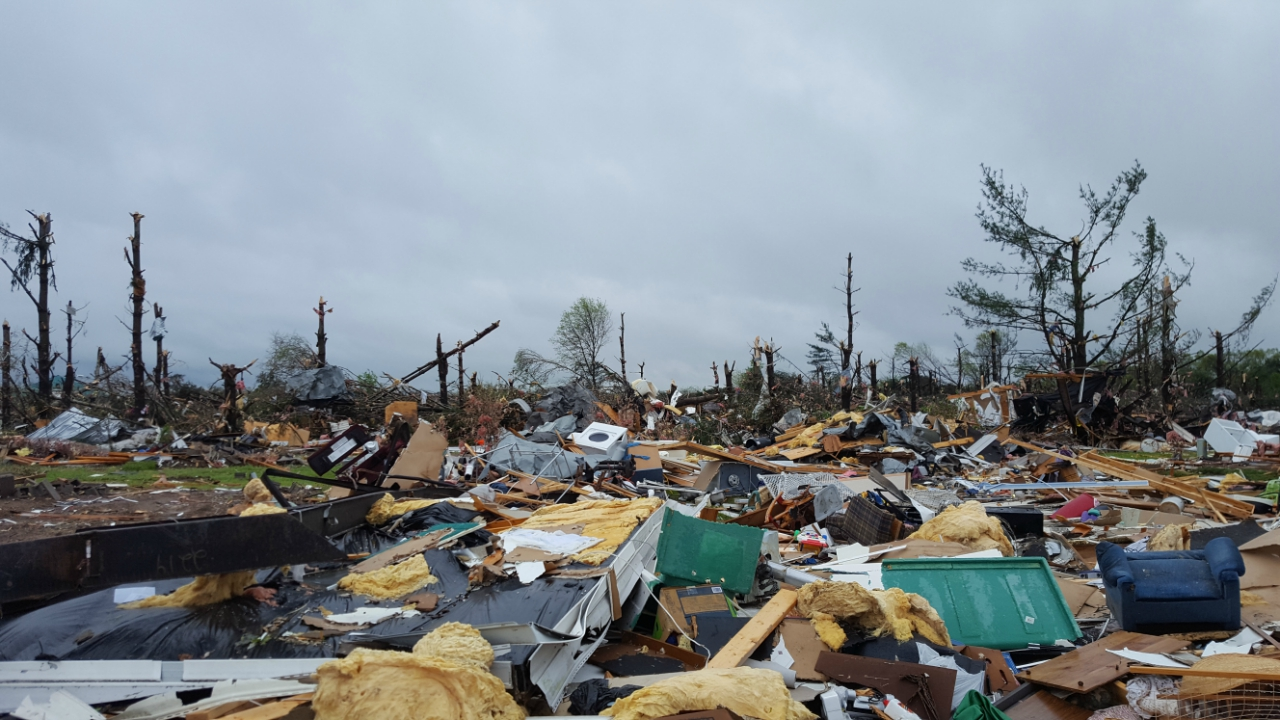
Destruction at the Prairie Lakes Estates mobile home park near Chetek, Wisconsin

This rain-wrapped, multiple-vortex EF3 wedge tornado was the longest-tracked tornado in Wisconsin state history. It moved through rural areas in the northwestern part of the state, producing an 82.53-mile long path of damage through four counties. The tornado touched down in Polk County, several miles east of Clear Lake, very close to the Polk/Barron County line. The first point of damage occurred at a farmstead, where structures sustained EF0 damage and sheet metal was tossed into a field. The tornado then quickly crossed into Barron County. Further to the northeast, some trees were downed and another farm sustained EF0 damage, with barrels being rolled out into a field and a pole barn having its doors blown in. Continuing along an east-northeasterly path through rural areas of the county, the tornado reached EF1 intensity, snapping and uprooting many trees and striking several farms. Sheds and outbuildings were damaged or destroyed, with sheet metal thrown and wrapped around trees and pieces of lumber speared into the ground. Two silos were sheared off as well. The tornado then widened and began moving in a more due-easterly direction, reaching EF2 strength as it crossed the Red Cedar River. Outbuildings were completely destroyed, a house had its roof torn off, many trees were snapped, and several other homes and a warehouse building sustained heavy roof damage in this area. Several mobile homes were destroyed further to the east before the tornado crossed US 53 northeast of Chetek. High-end EF2 damage occurred in this area as the Prairie Lakes Estates mobile home park sustained devastating damage. Numerous mobile homes were completely destroyed at this location, with large amounts of debris scattered throughout a nearby wooded area. Structural debris, furniture, clothing, and appliances were strewn throughout the park, and several vehicles were damaged or destroyed. Many trees were snapped and denuded in this area as well. One person at Prairie Lakes was killed and several others were injured, some critically. The tornado then struck a nearby turkey farm, where several large turkey barns were completely flattened with the debris strewn downwind, killing at least 25,000 turkeys. Several wooden power poles were snapped in this area as well. The tornado maintained high-end EF2 strength as it crossed Prairie Lake, where a wide swath of trees was flattened and several lakeside cottages sustained total roof loss and collapse of exterior walls. Weakening to EF1 strength and resuming a more northeasterly path, the tornado then crossed Mud Lake, snapping many more trees and causing mostly minor damage to numerous RVs, mobile homes, and lakeside homes. Past Mud Lake, several rural properties and farmsteads were struck at EF1 intensity, with outbuildings and garages destroyed. In Barron County alone, 40 homes were destroyed, 45 were heavily damaged, and 75 others sustained minor damage. Four businesses were destroyed, and two others were damaged.

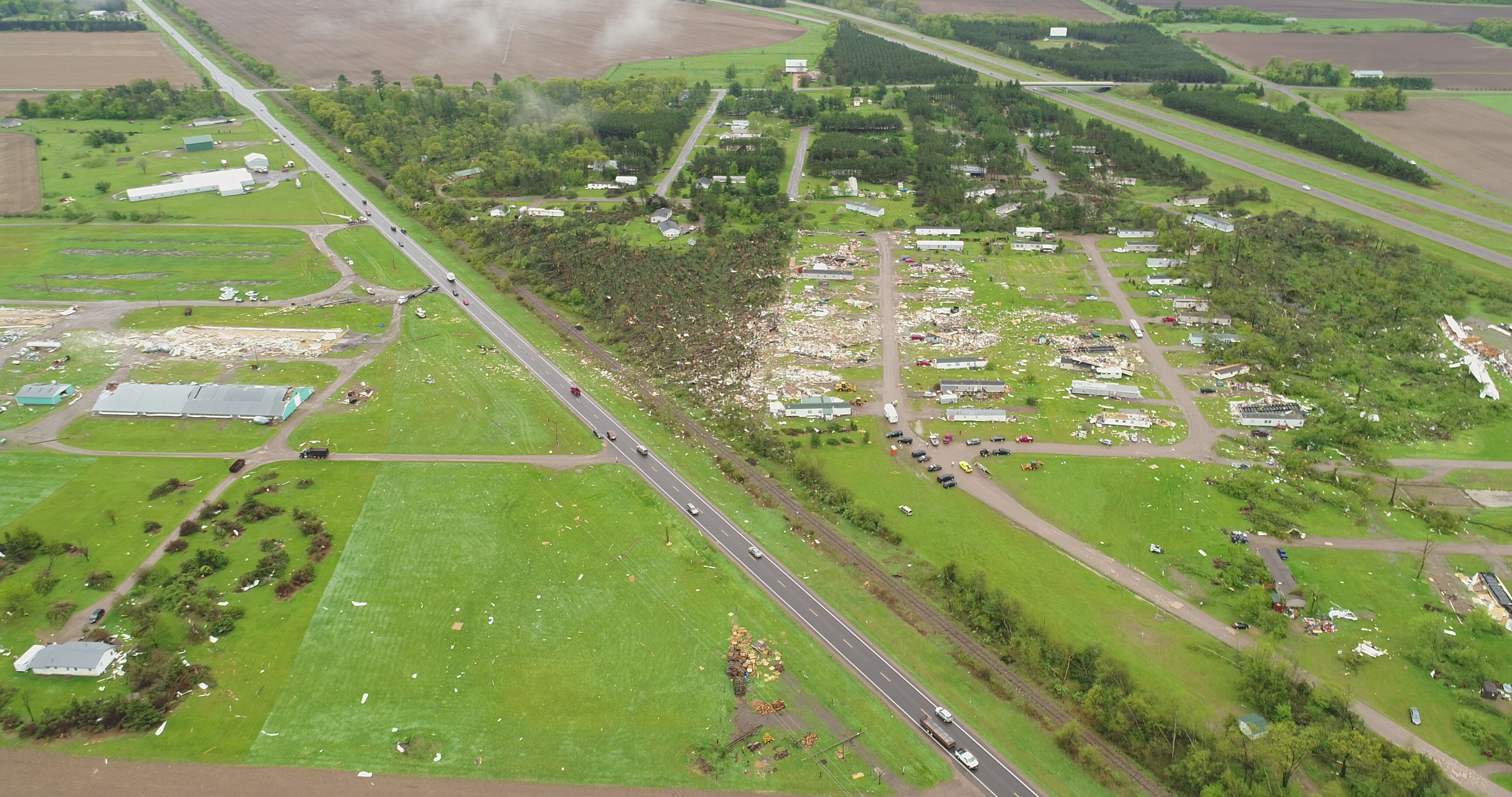
Aerial view of the Prairie Lakes Estates mobile home park near Chetek, Wisconsin.

Maintaining EF1 strength, the tornado continued into Rusk County and destroyed or damaged numerous outbuildings and downed many trees. An isolated pocket of EF2 damage occurred several miles east of the Rusk County line, as a frame home had its roof ripped off and a nearby detached garage was completely destroyed. Debris was blown into a nearby wooded area, along with a large metal propane tank. EF1 damage continued through rural areas of the county, with countless trees snapped or uprooted, many outbuildings damaged or destroyed, and homes sustaining roof damage. A silo had its metal top blown off, and cabins sustained damage at Amacoy Lake. Past Amacoy Lake, many additional trees were downed and more outbuildings were damaged or destroyed. As the tornado approached the small village of Conrath, it re-strengthened back to EF2 intensity. A large barn was completely destroyed, a detached garage was swept away, and a manufactured home was damaged in this area. As the tornado passed just north of Conrath, it reached its maximum intensity. A poorly anchored home was completely leveled at EF3 intensity in this area, with only a pile of rubble left behind. Nearby trees were snapped and denuded as well. Past Conrath, the tornado rapidly weakened back to EF1 strength as it continued to the east, damaging or destroying outbuildings and downing numerous trees. In Rusk County, one home was destroyed, three were severely damaged, and 21 sustained minor damage. Damage along the remainder of the path and into Price County consisted entirely of EF0 level tree damage. The tornado dissipated to the west-southwest of Ogema. The tornado reached a maximum width of 1,320 yards and killed one person. 25 others were injured.

== See also ==
- 1996 Oakfield tornado outbreak
