= Y23 =

Y23 may refer to:

== Train stations ==
- Akitsu Station (Hiroshima), in Higashihiroshima, Hiroshima, Japan
- Iyo-Mishima Station, in Shikokuchūō, Ehime, Japan
- Shimizusawa Station, in Yūbari, Hokkaidō, Japan
- Tatsumi Station, in Kōtō, Tokyo, Japan

== Other uses ==
- Bandy World Championship Y-23
- Chetek Municipal–Southworth Airport, in Wisconsin, United States
- Y-23 Valence Advanced Landing Ground, now Valence-Chabeuil Airport in France
