= Ian Premer =

American football tight end

No. 24 – Notre Dame Fighting Irish
- Position: Tight end
- Class: Freshman

Personal information
- Listed height: 6 ft 6 in (1.98 m)
- Listed weight: 245 lb (111 kg)

Career information
- High school: Great Bend (Great Bend, Kansas)
- College: Notre Dame (2026–present)
- Stats at ESPN

Ian Premer is an American college football tight end for the Notre Dame Fighting Irish.

== Early life ==
Premer attended Great Bend High School in Great Bend, Kansas, where he played tight end and safety. As a junior he had 30 receptions for 541 yards with eight touchdowns. As a senior, he was the Kansas Gatorade Football Player of the Year after recording 40 receptions for 734 yards with 14 touchdowns, 620 rushing yards and 14 rushing touchdowns on offense and six interceptions on defense. He was also named both the WAC Offensive and Defensive Player of the Year.

A five-star recruit, Premer was selected to play in the 2026 Navy All-American Bowl. He committed to the University of Notre Dame to play college football. Premer also played basketball in high school and received an offer to play college basketball at Kansas State University.
