= Great Bend High School Memorial Stadium =

Sport stadium in Kansas, United States

Coordinates: 38°22′18″N 98°46′16″W

- "The Field"
- Interactive map of Great Bend High School Memorial Stadium
- Location: Great Bend, Kansas
- Owner: Unified School District #428
- Operator: Unified School District #428

Tenants
- Great Bend High School; The Wheat Bowl

Great Bend High School Memorial Stadium is a sport stadium in Great Bend, Kansas. The facility is primarily used by the Great Bend High School football and track & field teams. The stadium underwent renovation recently. The stadium was also used as a temporary home by nearby Hoisington High School after much of Hoisington suffered severe damage from an F-4 tornado on April 21, 2001.

The Wheat Bowl was played at this location - the only National Association of Intercollegiate Athletics endorsed Pre-Season bowl game.
