= Tony Hobson (basketball) =

American basketball player and coach

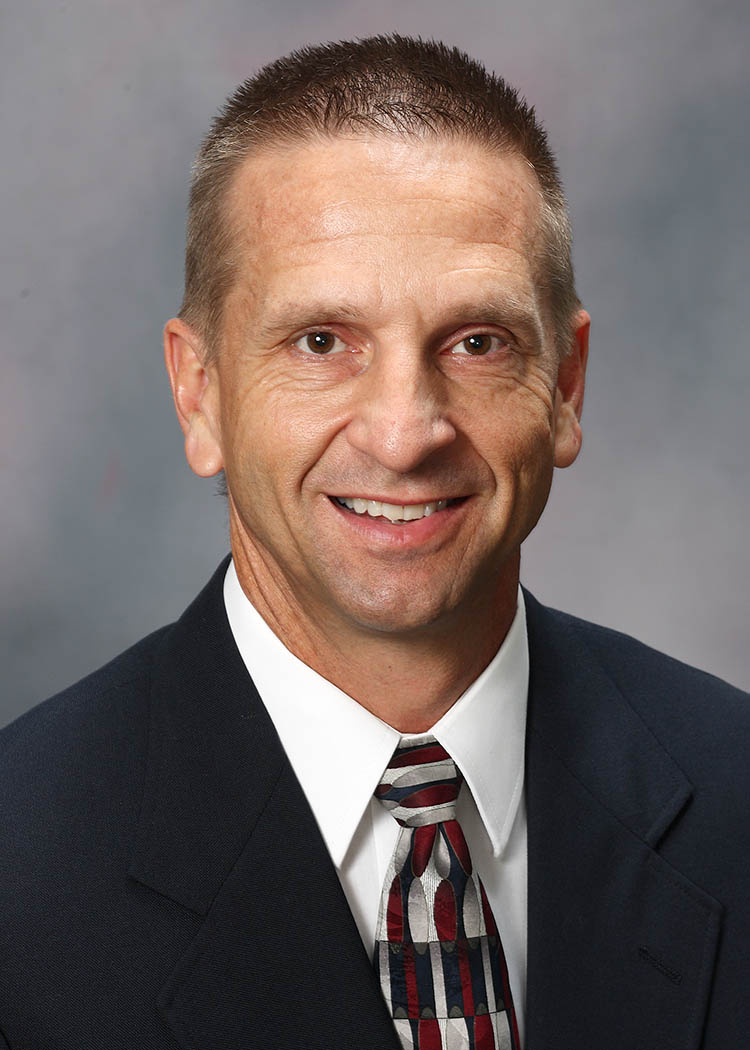

Biographical details
- Born: March 29, 1959 (age 67); Hardy, Nebraska
- Education: Barton Community College; Hastings College; United States Sports Academy

Playing career
- 1977–1978: Barton CC
- 1978–1980: Hastings

Coaching career (HC unless noted)
- 1983–1989: Cloud County CC
- 1997–2000: Barton CC
- 2000–2001: Hastings (assoc. HC)
- 2001–2008: Hastings
- 2008–2023: Fort Hays State

Head coaching record
- Overall: 745–227 (.766)

Accomplishments and honors

Championships
- 3 NAIA Division II Tournament championship (2002, 2003, 2006); 4 MIAA regular season championships (2014, 2018, 2021, 2022); 2 MIAA Tournament championships (2019, 2022); 6 MCC regular season championships

Awards
- 4 MIAA Coach of the Year (2015, 2016, 2019, 2021); 3 NAIA Coach of the Year (2002, 2003, 2006); 2 WBCA Regional Coach of the Year (1999, 2015); 2 GPAC Coach of the Year (2004, 2006); KJCCC West Coach of the Year (1999)

Anthony C. Hobson (born March 29, 1959) was a long-time American college women's basketball coach who ended his career in 2023 at Fort Hays State University. While at Fort Hays State, Hobson led the Tigers to four conference regular season championships and seven NCAA tournaments. Prior to that post, Hobson was the head coach for his alma mater Hastings College from 2001 to 2008, where he led the school to three National Association of Intercollegiate Athletics national championships. Hobson coached at Cloud County Community College and his alma mater Barton Community College prior to coaching at Hastings.

== Career ==
=== Early coaching career ===
Hobson, a Hardy, Nebraska native, began his coaching career in 1983 at Cloud County Community College, where he spent six seasons as the head coach leading the women's basketball program to six consecutive winning seasons. Hobson took eight seasons off to coach at the high school level before he landed a job at his alma mater, Barton Community College. While at Barton, Hobson turned the Lady Cougars program around landing him the Kansas Jayhawk Community College Conference West Division Coach of the Year in 1999. Hobson left Barton after the conclusion of the 1999–2000 season.

=== Hastings College ===
Hobson left Barton County Community College to become an associate head coach for his other alma mater, Hastings College, where he would then take over as head coach in 2001. During his seven seasons at the helm of the Broncos program, Hobson led the program to three NAIA National Championships – two of which were his first two seasons – earning him the NAIA Coach of the Year award all three seasons, and led the team to the NAIA Tournament each season. Also during his tenure at Hastings, Hobson racked in two Great Plains Athletic Conference coach of the year awards in 2004 and 2006, and finished his time at Hastings with a record of 211–40 (.841).

=== Fort Hays State University ===
In June 2008, Fort Hays State University chose Hobson to lead its women's basketball program. During his time at Fort Hays State, an NCAA Division II school, the Tigers have won one conference regular season championship, made three NCAA Division II Tournament appearances, and Hobson has earned the MIAA Coach of the Year award both in 2015 and 2016.

== Head coach record ==
Record table
| Season | Team | Overall | Conference | Standing | Postseason |
|---|---|---|---|---|---|
Cloud County Thunderbirds (Kansas Jayhawk Community College Conference) (1983–1989)
| 1983–84 | Cloud County | 24–3 | | | |
| 1984–85 | Cloud County | 23–3 | | | |
| 1985–86 | Cloud County | 16–12 | | | Region VI runner-up |
| 1986–87 | Cloud County | 20–7 | | | |
| 1987–88 | Cloud County | 22–9 | | | |
| 1988–89 | Cloud County | 19–10 | | | |
| Cloud County: | | 124–44 (.738) | | | |
Barton Cougars (Kansas Jayhawk Community College Conference) (1997–2000)
| 1997–98 | Barton County | 15–16 | | | |
| 1998–99 | Barton County | 29–2 | | | |
| 1999–2000 | Barton County | 34–4 | | | |
| Cloud County: | | 78–22 (.780) | | | |
Hastings Broncos (Great Plains Athletic Conference) (2001–2008)
| 2001–02 | Hastings | 34–3 | | 1st | NAIA Tournament champions |
| 2002–03 | Hastings | 33–5 | | 1st | NAIA Tournament champions |
| 2003–04 | Hastings | 31–4 | | | NAIA Tournament |
| 2004–05 | Hastings | 24–9 | | | NCAA Regionals |
| 2005–06 | Hastings | 31–6 | | 1st | NAIA Tournament champions |
| 2006–07 | Hastings | 28–7 | | | NAIA Tournament |
| 2007–08 | Hastings | 20–6 | | | NAIA Tournament |
| Hastings: | | 211–40 (.841) | | | |
Fort Hays State Tigers (Mid-America Intercollegiate Athletics Association) (2008–present)
| 2008–09 | Fort Hays State | 12–16 | 8–12 | 7th | |
| 2009–10 | Fort Hays State | 15–13 | 8–12 | 7th | |
| 2010–11 | Fort Hays State | 12–14 | 9–13 | 9th | |
| 2011–12 | Fort Hays State | 20–9 | 12–8 | 5th | |
| 2012–13 | Fort Hays State | 22–7 | 12–6 | 4th | |
| 2013–14 | Fort Hays State | 21–8 | 12–7 | 5th | |
| 2014–15 | Fort Hays State | 30–4 | 18–1 | 1st | NCAA Division II Sweet 16 |
| 2015–16 | Fort Hays State | 25–6 | 18–4 | T–2nd | NCAA Central Regionals |
| 2016–17 | Fort Hays State | 22–8 | 12–7 | 6th | |
| 2017–18 | Fort Hays State | 26–7 | 14–5 | 3rd | NCAA Central Regionals |
| 2018–19 | Fort Hays State | 32–2 | 18–1 | 1st | NCAA Central Regional Finals |
| 2019–20 | Fort Hays State | 23–7 | 13–6 | T-4th | NCAA Central Regionals (selected before cancellation) |
| 2020–21 | Fort Hays State | 22–4 | 20–2 | 1st | NCAA Central Regional Semi-Finals |
| 2021–22 | Fort Hays State | 30–4 | 19–3 | T-1st | NCAA Central Regional Finals |
| 2022–23 | Fort Hays State | 20–12 | 14–8 | 6th | |
| Fort Hays State: | | 332–121 (.733) | 207–95 (.685) | | |
| Total: | | 745–227 (.766) | | | |
National champion Postseason invitational champion Conference regular season champion Conference regular season and conference tournament champion Division regular season champion Division regular season and conference tournament champion Conference tournament champion
