= Wheat Bowl =

Wheat Bowl (defunct)
- Wheat Bowl Football Classic
- The only sanctioned NAIA pre-season bowl game
- Stadium: Great Bend High School Memorial Stadium
- Location: Great Bend, Kansas
- Previous locations: Ellinwood, Kansas
- Operated: 1995–2006

Sponsors
- various

2006 matchup
- Northwestern Oklahoma vs Lindenwood (14–13)

The Wheat Bowl was the only National Association of Intercollegiate Athletics endorsed pre-season bowl game that operated from 1995 until 2006. The Wheat Bowl Football Classic was headquartered in the Central Kansas town of Ellinwood and was played in nearby Great Bend annually as the kickoff for the NAIA season.

In 1995 and 1996, the game was played as a "post-season" game. Beginning in 1997, the Wheat Bowl Football Classic was successfully switched to a pre-season contest to eliminate several potential obstacles: the possibility of inclement weather, conflicts with Kansas State University and University of Kansas home games as well as conflicts with high school playoffs.

Due to facilities not being available, no game was played in 2007. The next game was scheduled for August 23, 2008 at the newly renovated Great Bend Memorial Stadium. According to the bowl website, it appears that the game was not played as originally scheduled and the bowl is now considered defunct. The College Fanz First Down Classic preseason bowl began in 2007 and was considered the kick-off of the NAIA season until its final game in 2011.

== Game results ==
Year	Winning Team		Losing Team	
1995	MidAmerica Nazarene Pioneers	38	Ottawa Braves	0
1996	Southwestern Moundbuilders	28	Baker Wildcats	20
1997	Sioux Falls Cougars	35	Benedictine Ravens	10
1998	NW Oklahoma State Rangers	40	MidAmerica Nazarene Pioneers	7
1999	No. 12 NW Oklahoma State Rangers	49	Missouri Valley Vikings	14
2000	Concordia Bulldogs	31	Lindenwood Lions	14
2001	No. 19 Peru State Bobcats	21	No. 13 Baker Wildcats	14
2002	Midland Warriors	25	Bacone Warriors	15
2003	No. 10 MidAmerica Nazarene Pioneers	21	Southern Nazarene Crimson Storm	14
2004	No. 22 Midland Warriors	31	Avila Eagles	9
2005	No. 23 Graceland Yellowjackets	24	Southern Nazarene Crimson Storm	20
2006	NW Oklahoma State Rangers	14	No. 15 Lindenwood Lions	13

== Community College ==
There was a game called the "Wheat Bowl" played between Kansas Community Colleges from 1948 to 1950. Although the name is the same, the organization was completely different. This particular bowl is now defunct.
