= Chetek (town), Wisconsin =

Town in Wisconsin, United States

Chetek, Wisconsin
- Town
- Town of Chetek
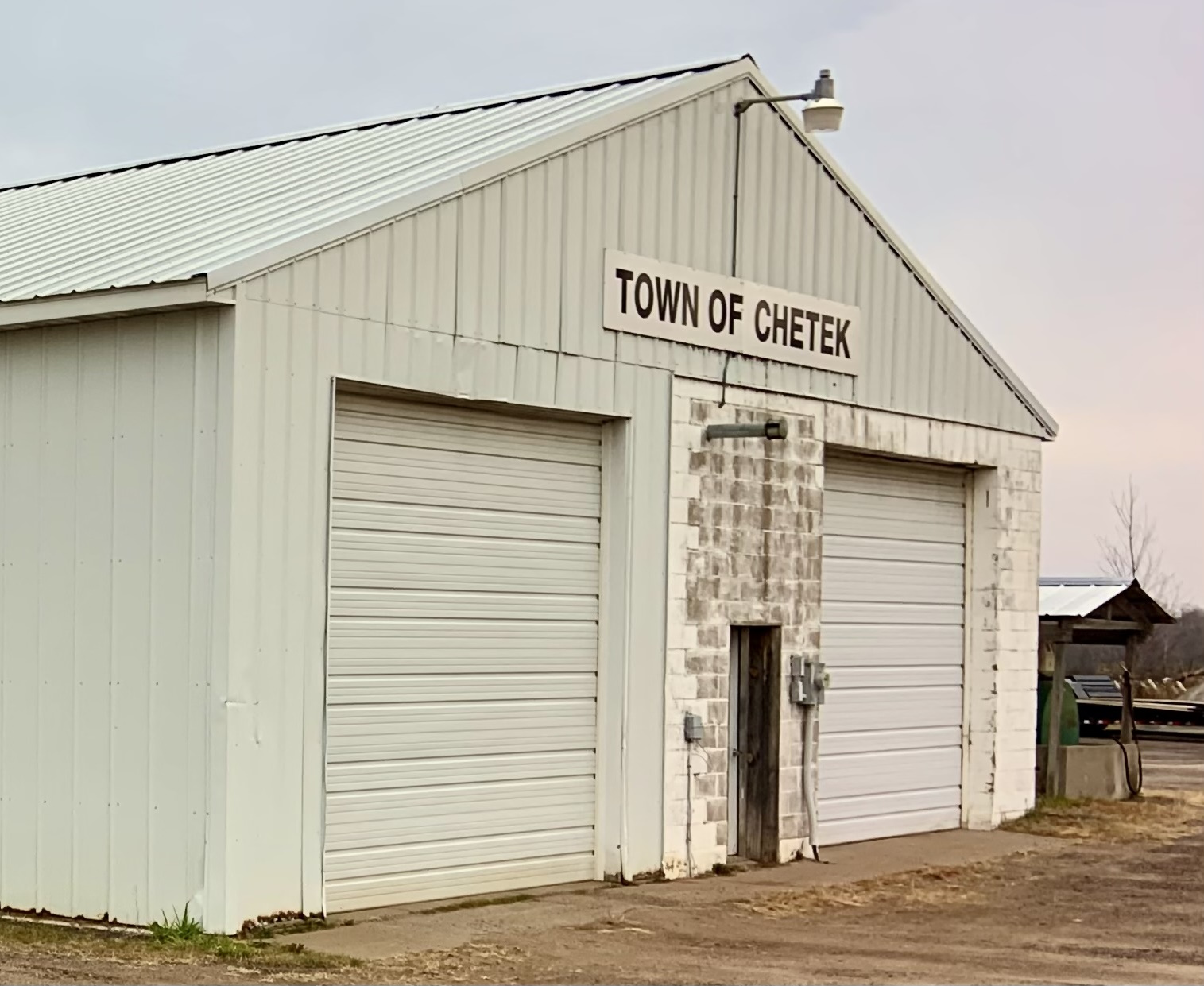
- Chetek Town Hall

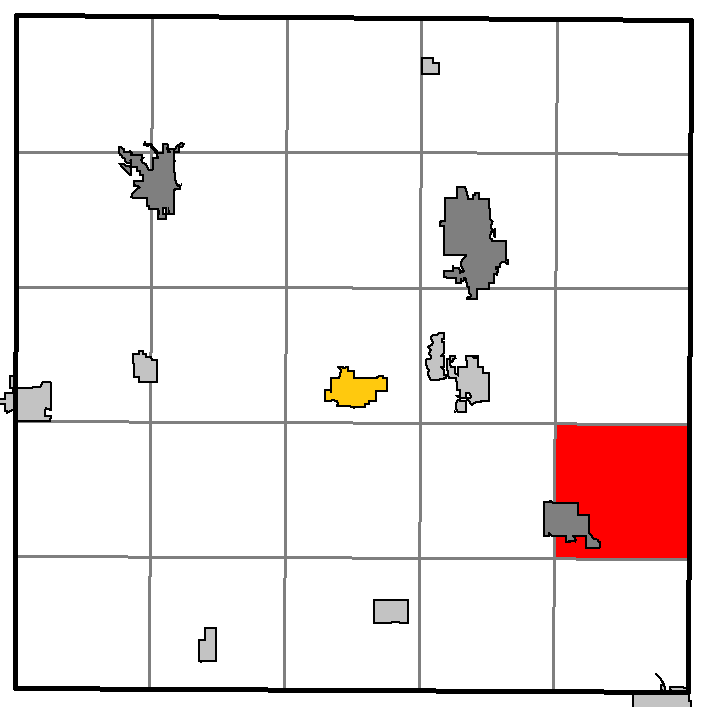
- Location of Chetek, within Barron County, Wisconsin

- Location of Barron County, Wisconsin
- Coordinates: 45°20′25″N 91°35′54″W
- Country: United States
- State: Wisconsin
- County: Barron

Area
  - Total: 33.58 sq mi (87.0 km^{2})
  - Land: 30.47 sq mi (78.9 km^{2})
  - Water: 3.11 sq mi (8.1 km^{2})

Population (2020)
  - Total: 1,726
  - Density: 56.65/sq mi (21.87/km^{2})
- Time zone: UTC-6 (Central (CST))
  - Summer (DST): UTC-5 (CDT)
- ZIP Code: 54728
- Area code(s): 715 & 534
- GNIS feature ID: 1582952
- Website: townofchetekwi.com

Chetek is a town in Barron County in the U.S. state of Wisconsin. The population was 1,726 at the 2020 census, up from 1,644 at the 2010 census. The City of Chetek is located partially within the town.

== History ==
Some of the early European Americans to walk the six mile square that would become Chetek were the U.S. government's surveyors. In 1852 they surveyed the outline of the township on foot with chain and compass. Then others returned in 1854 to survey all the section lines. When done, the deputy surveyor filed this general description:

Contin? their course again at the mouth of the Lake in section 30 and form a large stream which flows in a S.E. direction - with a smooth, gentle current - until it leaves the Township in section 31. Louis Montra has built a house and improved land in the fractional N.W. 1/4 of the N.W. 1/4 of section 29, which is all the settlement there is in the Township.

== Geography ==
The town of Chetek is in southeastern Barron County; the eastern border of the town is the border with Rusk County to the east. Lake Chetek is in the southwestern part of the town. The lake has a maximum depth of 22 feet and mean depth of 13 feet. The most common fish include panfish, largemouth bass, northern pike, and walleye, with smallmouth bass also present. The city of Chetek occupies the western portion of the lake, while the town of Chetek covers the rest of the lake. Pokegama Lake and Mud Lake, two connected lakes forming a single arm of Lake Chetek, extend north towards the geographic center of the town.

U.S. Route 53, a four-lane expressway, crosses the southwestern corner of the town, with access from Exit 126.

According to the United States Census Bureau, the town has a total area of 33.6 square miles (86.9 km^{2}), of which 30.4 square miles (78.8 km^{2}) is land and 3.1 square miles (8.1 km^{2}), or 9.27%, is water.

== Demographics ==
As of the census of 2000, there were 1,686 people, 707 households, and 542 families residing in the town. The population density was 55.4 people per square mile (21.4/km^{2}). There were 1,073 housing units at an average density of 35.2 per square mile (13.6/km^{2}). The racial makeup of the town was 98.64% White, 0.18% Black or African American, 0.18% Native American, 0.18% Asian, 0.06% from other races, and 0.77% from two or more races. Hispanic or Latino people of any race were 0.53% of the population.

There were 707 households, out of which 23.9% had children under the age of 18 living with them, 68.3% were married couples living together, 4.8% had a female householder with no husband present, and 23.2% were non-families. 20.4% of all households were made up of individuals, and 10.2% had someone living alone who was 65 years of age or older. The average household size was 2.38 and the average family size was 2.73.

In the town, the population was spread out, with 19.2% under the age of 18, 6.4% from 18 to 24, 21.0% from 25 to 44, 33.8% from 45 to 64, and 19.6% who were 65 years of age or older. The median age was 46 years. For every 100 females, there were 104.9 males. For every 100 females age 18 and over, there were 106.5 males.

The median income for a household in the town was $38,125, and the median income for a family was $42,604. Males had a median income of $34,091 versus $21,250 for females. The per capita income for the town was $21,273. About 5.1% of families and 6.3% of the population were below the poverty line, including 5.5% of those under age 18 and 6.6% of those age 65 or over.
