= The Chetek Alert =

- Type: Weekly newspaper
- Owner(s): Bell Press
- Publisher: Jim Bell
- Editor: Jim Bell
- Founded: 1882
- Headquarters: PO Box 5, 312 Knapp St. Chetek, WI 54728
- Circulation: 2,150 (as of 2022)
- Website: chetekalert.com

The Chetek Alert is a weekly newspaper published in the Barron County, Wisconsin city of Chetek since September 15, 1882. It has been owned by Jim Bell since 2011.
