= Great Bend USD 428 =

Public school district in Great Bend, Kansas

Address
- 201 S. Patton Rd. Great Bend, Kansas, 67530; United States
- Coordinates: 38.3525°N 98.8120°W

District information
- Type: Public
- Grades: K to 12
- Superintendent: Khris Thexton
- Schools: 8

Other information
- Website: greatbendschools.net

Great Bend USD 428 is a public unified school district headquartered in Great Bend, Kansas, United States. The district includes the community of Great Bend and nearby rural areas.

== History ==
In 1885 the first high school in Great Bend opened. The Central School facility, a new high school building, was built in 1908. The 1885 building was razed prior to 1908, and then a junior high school was built on that site in 1912. There was an east building at the Central School built in 1912. Around 1912 the community decided that a replacement high school needed to be built, along with two elementary schools. Another high school opened in 1925. In 1949 the community voted to build a new high school. The 1908 building, together with a library built in 1908, was collectively renamed Central School in 1952, and it was made a sixth grade center. Central School was razed circa 1969.

== Schools ==
The school district operates the following schools:

- Great Bend High School
- Great Bend Middle School
- Eisenhower Elementary School
- Jefferson Elementary School
- Lincoln Elementary School
- Park Elementary School
- Riley Elementary School
- Helping Hands Preschool

== See also ==
- Kansas State Department of Education
- Kansas State High School Activities Association
- List of high schools in Kansas
- List of unified school districts in Kansas
