= Great Bend Zoo =

- Interactive map of Great Bend Zoo
- 38.373035°N 98.766359°W
- Location: Great Bend, Kansas, US
- No. of species: 60+
- Website: greatbendzoo.com

The Great Bend Zoo (formally the Great Bend-Brit Spaugh Zoo) is a medium-sized zoo in Great Bend, Kansas in the United States. It is located within Brit Spaugh Park, just off U.S. Route 281 in the north central portion of the city. Founded in 1953, the zoo is one of Great Bend's biggest attractions.

== See also ==
- Great Bend, Kansas
