= Chetek, Wisconsin =

- City
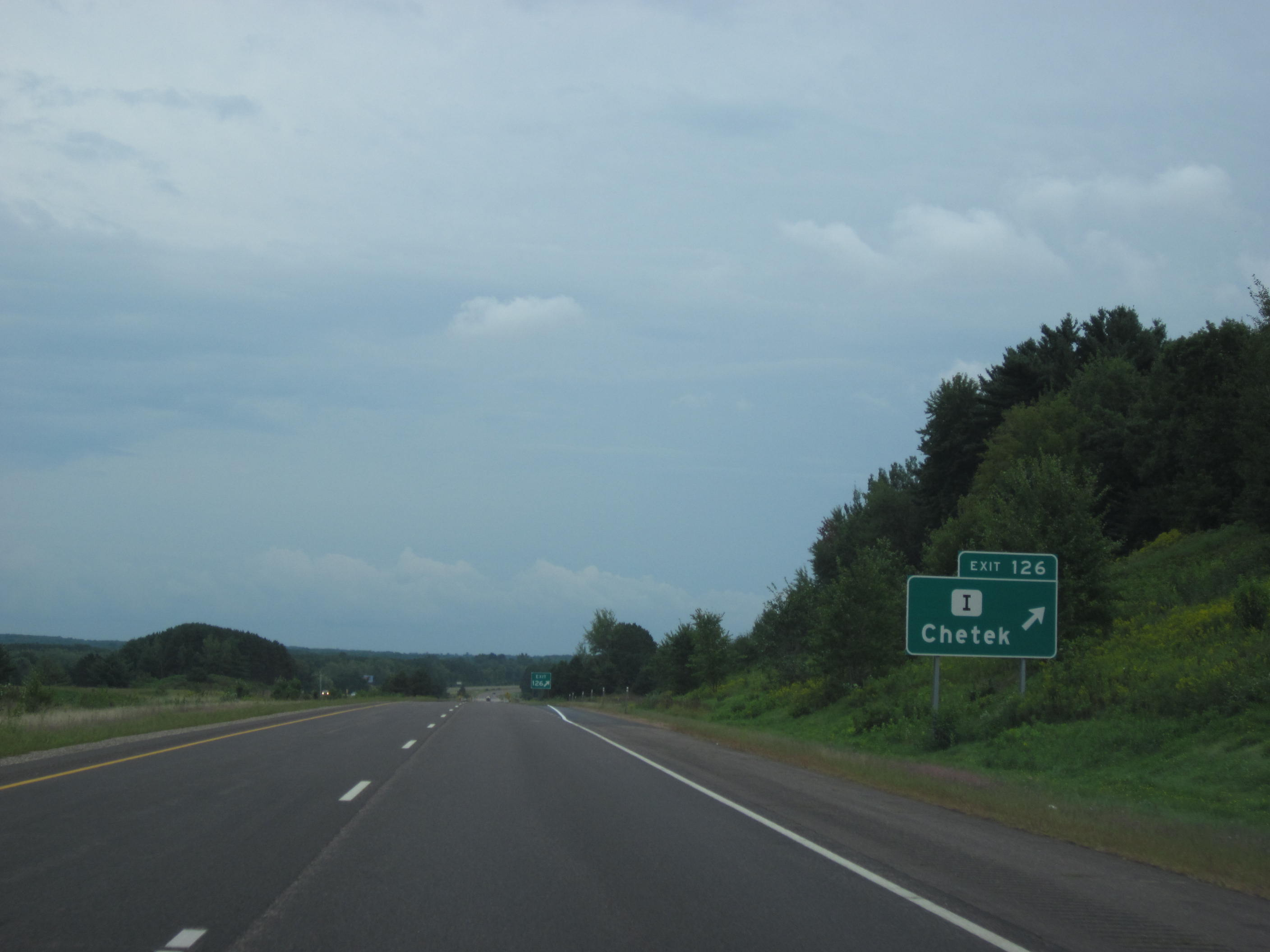
- U.S. Highway 53 at Chetek

- Location of Chetek in Barron County, Wisconsin

- Location within Wisconsin Location within the United States
- Coordinates: 45°19′7″N 91°39′16″W
- Country: United States
- State: Wisconsin
- County: Barron

Area
  - Total: 3.11 sq mi (8.05 km^{2})
  - Land: 2.40 sq mi (6.21 km^{2})
  - Water: 0.71 sq mi (1.85 km^{2})
- Elevation: 1,050 ft (320 m)

Population (2020)
  - Total: 2,172
  - Density: 906/sq mi (350/km^{2})
- Time zone: UTC-6 (Central (CST))
  - Summer (DST): UTC-5 (CDT)
- Zip Code: 54728
- Area codes: 715 & 534
- FIPS code: 55-14325
- GNIS feature ID: 1562995
- Website: cityofchetekwi.us

Chetek is a city in Barron County, Wisconsin, United States. The population was 2,172 at the 2020 census, down from 2,221 at the 2010 census. The city is partially within the Town of Chetek.

== History ==
The original inhabitants of the area were the Ojibwe Indians, who referred to the area as zhedeg, meaning "pelicans". This was variously transliterated as "Sheetak", "Shetak", "Shetuk", and "Chetack", until the first post office was opened in 1872, when the spelling was standardized as "Chetek".

In 1872, the Omaha Railroad began service to Chetek, the Knapp-Stout logging camp was established, and the first log schoolhouse was built.

Other important dates:

- 1881 – Medical care became available.
- 1882 – The Chetek Alert began publication, a newspaper still serving the area.
- 1891 – Chetek became a city.
- 1903 – Telephone service was introduced.
- 1904 – The fire department began.
- 1960 – Roselawn Elementary opened.
- 2010 – School District of Chetek consolidated with Weyerhaeuser School District.
- 2017 – An EF3 tornado swept through the town, killing one and injuring 25, as well as damaging and destroying structures.

High School, Chetek Wisconsin, early 20th century

== Geography ==
Chetek is located at 45°19′7″N 91°39′16″W (45.318656, -91.65447).

According to the United States Census Bureau, the city has an area of 3.13 square miles (8.11 km^{2}), of which 2.42 square miles (6.27 km^{2}) is land and 0.71 square miles (1.84 km^{2}) is water.

Chetek is along U.S. Highway 53, as well as County Roads I and SS.

== Demographics ==
Historical population
Census	Pop.	Note	%±
1890	406		—
1900	531		30.8%
1910	829		56.1%
1920	1,154		39.2%
1930	1,076		−6.8%
1940	1,227		14.0%
1950	1,585		29.2%
1960	1,729		9.1%
1970	1,630		−5.7%
1980	1,931		18.5%
1990	1,953		1.1%
2000	2,180		11.6%
2010	2,221		1.9%
2020	2,172		−2.2%
U.S. Decennial Census

=== 2010 census ===
As of the census of 2010, there were 2,221 people, 951 households, and 564 families living in the city. The population density was 917.8 inhabitants per square mile (354.4/km^{2}). There were 1,104 housing units at an average density of 456.2 per square mile (176.1/km^{2}). The racial makeup of the city was 97.4% White, 0.2% African American, 0.4% Native American, 0.3% Asian, 0.7% from other races, and 0.9% from two or more races. Hispanic or Latino people of any race were 1.8% of the population.

There were 951 households, of which 26.9% had children under the age of 18 living with them, 43.2% were married couples living together, 11.3% had a female householder with no husband present, 4.8% had a male householder with no wife present, and 40.7% were non-families. 34.8% of all households were made up of individuals, and 18.4% had someone living alone who was 65 years of age or older. The average household size was 2.22 and the average family size was 2.82.

The median age in the city was 44.7 years. 21.1% of residents were under the age of 18; 6.8% were between the ages of 18 and 24; 22.6% were from 25 to 44; 24.7% were from 45 to 64; and 25% were 65 years of age or older. The gender makeup of the city was 45.9% male and 54.1% female.

=== 2000 census ===
As of the census of 2000, there were 2,180 people, 939 households, and 568 families living in the city. The population density was 925.7 people per square mile (358.2/km^{2}). There were 1,052 housing units at an average density of 446.7 per square mile (172.8/km^{2}). The racial makeup of the city was 98.62% White, 0.09% Black or African American, 0.32% Native American, 0.23% Asian, 0.05% Pacific Islander, 0.09% from other races, and 0.60% from two or more races. Hispanic or Latino people of any race were 0.96% of the population.

There were 939 households, of which 25.0% had children under the age of 18 living with them, 47.9% were married couples living together, 8.7% had a female householder with no husband present, and 39.5% were non-families. 34.9% of all households were made up of individuals, and 20.4% had someone living alone who was 65 years of age or older. The average household size was 2.21 and the average family size was 2.81.

In the city, the population was spread out, with 22.2% under the age of 18, 7.2% from 18 to 24, 24.3% from 25 to 44, 20.8% from 45 to 64, and 25.6% who were 65 years of age or older. The median age was 43 years. For every 100 females, there were 92.9 males. For every 100 females age 18 and over, there were 88.6 males.

The median income for a household in the city was $31,270, and the median income for a family was $40,114. Males had a median income of $28,375 versus $18,906 for females. The per capita income for the city was $17,922. About 9.0% of families and 12.4% of the population were below the poverty line, including 15.0% of those under age 18 and 8.3% of those age 65 or over.

== Transportation ==
Chetek Municipal–Southworth Airport (Y23) serves the city and surrounding communities.

== Notable people ==
- Leona E. Tyler, psychologist and President of the American Psychological Association
- J. B. Van Hollen, Wisconsin Attorney General
- John C. Van Hollen, Wisconsin realtor and politician

== See also ==
- List of cities in Wisconsin
