= Barton Cougars =

- University: Barton Community College
- Association: NJCAA
- Conference: Kansas Jayhawk Community College Conference
- Athletic director: Trevor Rolfs
- Location: Great Bend, Kansas
- Varsity teams: 15
- Basketball arena: Kirkman Activity Center
- Baseball stadium: Lawson-Biggs Field
- Softball stadium: Cougar Field
- Soccer stadium: Cougar Soccer and Track Complex
- Nickname: Cougars
- Colors: Royal blue and light gold
- Website: bartonsports.com

The Barton Cougars are the sports teams of Barton Community College located in Great Bend, Kansas, United States. They participate in the National Junior College Athletic Association (NJCAA) and in the Kansas Jayhawk Community College Conference.

== Sports ==
Men's sports

- Baseball
- Basketball
- Bowling
- Cross country
- Golf
- Soccer
- Swimming
- Tennis
- Track & field
- Wrestling

Women's sports

- Basketball
- Bowling
- Cross country
- Golf
- Soccer
- Softball
- Swimming
- Tennis
- Track & field
- Volleyball

== Facilities ==
Barton Community College has five athletics facilities.

- Lawson-Biggs Field – home of the Cougars baseball team
- L.T. & Sheila Fleske Court in Kirkman Activity Center – home of the Cougars men's and women's basketball teams, and volleyball team
- Tennis Courts – home of the Cougars tennis teams
- Cougar Field – home of the Lady Cougars softball team
- Cougar Soccer & Track Complex – home of the Cougars soccer and track & field teams
