= Great Bend High School =

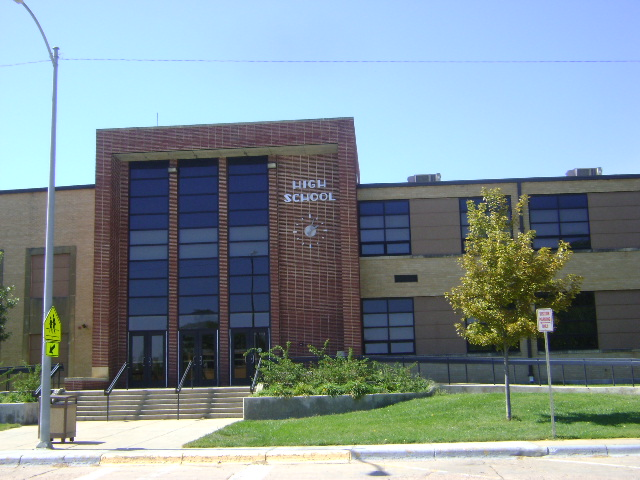
- Front of school (2010)

Location
- 2027 Morton Street; Great Bend, Kansas 67530; United States; 38.371645°N 98.770195°W

Information
- School type: Public, High School
- School board: Board Website
- School district: Great Bend USD 428
- CEEB code: 171158
- Principal: Brock Funke
- Teaching staff: 65.40 (FTE)
- Grades: 9 to 12
- Enrollment: 954 (2023–2024)
- Student to teacher ratio: 14.59
- Campus: Urban
- Colors: Red; Black
- Athletics conference: Western Athletic Conference
- Mascot: Panthers
- Rival: Hays High School
- Newspaper: Panther Tales
- Website: School Website

Great Bend High School is a public high school located in Great Bend, Kansas, serving students in grades 9–12. The school is the only high school in Great Bend USD 428 public school district. The athletic teams are known as the Panthers and all athletic programs compete in the 5A division according to the KSHSAA.

== History ==
Great Bend High School was established early in the 20th century in order to help educate the growing population of Great Bend, Kansas. Shortly after the school was founded, the Panther was chosen as the official school mascot and students voted to implement red and black as the school colors. As the years progressed, Great Bend established many programs, both athletic and non-athletic.

== Extracurricular activities ==
The school is a member of the Kansas State High School Activities Association and is classified as a 5A school, the second-largest division in Kansas. The Panthers have won several state championships and have produced several collegiate athletes. The football games are played at Great Bend High School Memorial Stadium. Soccer games are played at the Jean Cavanaugh Soccer Complex.

=== Athletics ===
==== Basketball ====
During the years of 2005 and 2006, Great Bend High School won two state championships in basketball. Jeff Langrehr was the first basketball coach in Great Bend High School history to help the team win back-to-back state championships. The girls basketball team was the state runner-up in 2009.

=== State championships ===
State Championships
Season	Sport	Number of Championships	Year
Fall	Tennis, Girls	1	1998
Fall	Cross Country, Boys	3	1999, 2000, 2001
Fall	Cross Country, Girls	2	2000, 2001
Winter	Basketball, Girls	1	1980
Winter	Basketball, Boys	2	2005, 2006
Winter	Indoor Track & Field, Girls	1	1977
Winter	Bowling, Boys	1	2013
Spring	Golf, Girls	2	1973, 1974
Spring	Baseball	3	1955, 1995, 1998
Spring	Track & Field, Girls	5	1977, 1978, 1982, 1983, 2007
Spring	Track & Field, Boys	2	1970, 1972
Total		23	

=== Non-athletic programs ===
==== Danceline ====
Great Bend High School's danceline performs new dances at football and basketball games during halftime. The 'Panther' Danceline consists of 18 dancers ranging from freshmen to seniors.

==== Madrigals ====
Great Bend High School's select ensemble singing group is known as The Madrigal Pop Singers. The group is composed of students in the junior and senior classes.

==== Great Bend High School Marching Band ====
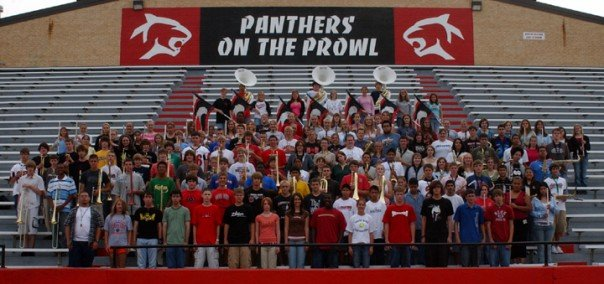
The 2005–2006 Panther Marching Band

The Great Bend High School Marching Band averages between 40 and 90 students every year. The band won 1 ratings in the Hutchinson, Kansas State Parade, WAC Marching Festival in Garden City, Kansas, and High Plains Marching Festival at Fort Hays State University in 2005 and 2006. During Labor Day, the band dedicates its time to perform a parade in Hoisington, Kansas. Ronald D. Mink was the first Band Director to start the American Heritage Concerts era and the first to take the band to major national competitions every four years.

==== Debate/Forensics ====
The school offers debate and forensics programs for students. The debate team won KSHSAA state championships in 1974, 1976, 1978 and 1983.

== Notable alumni ==
- Jack Kilby (1923–2005), 2000 Nobel Prize laureate in physics, co-inventor of the integrated circuit (IC), handheld calculator, and thermal printer. The commons area of the high school is named after him, The Jack Kilby Commons Area.
- Ian Premer (born 2007), tight end for the Notre Dame Fighting Irish
- Monte Robbins (born 1964), former American football punter.
- Derek Tournear (born 1975), senior US DoD official and Director of the Space Development Agency.

== See also ==
- Great Bend High School Memorial Stadium
- List of high schools in Kansas
- List of unified school districts in Kansas
