= Great Bend Municipal Airport =

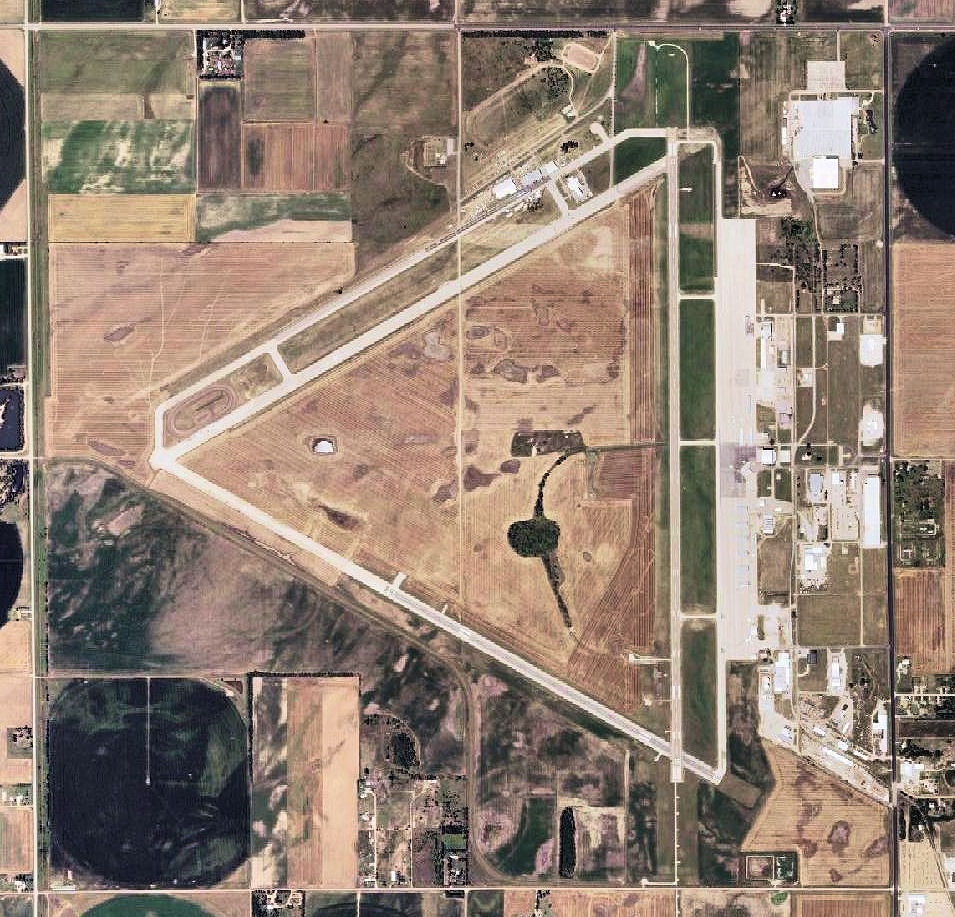
- USGS 2006 orthophoto
- IATA: GBD; ICAO: KGBD; FAA LID: GBD

Summary
- Airport type: Public
- Owner: City of Great Bend
- Serves: Great Bend, Kansas
- Elevation AMSL: 1,887 ft (575 m)
- Coordinates: 38°20′39″N 098°51′33″W
- Website: https://www.greatbendks.net/index.aspx?nid=190

Map
- Location within Kansas Location within the United States

Runways
Direction	Length		Surface
Direction	ft	m	Surface
17/35	7,852	2,393	Asphalt
11/29	4,706	1,434	Asphalt

Statistics (2022)
- Aircraft operations: 8,775
- Based aircraft: 48
- Source: Federal Aviation Administration

Great Bend Municipal Airport (IATA: GBD, ICAO: KGBD, FAA LID: GBD) is five miles west of Great Bend, in Barton County, Kansas. It is used for general aviation and formerly saw one airline, subsidized by the Essential Air Service program.

The Federal Aviation Administration says this airport had 1,407 passenger boardings (enplanements) in calendar year 2008, 927 in 2009, and 719 in 2010. The National Plan of Integrated Airport Systems for 2017–2021 categorized it as a general aviation airport (the commercial service category requires 2,500 enplanements per year).

== History ==
In World War II the facility was Great Bend Army Airfield and was used for United States Army Air Forces Second Air Force training. It was one of the first B-29 Superfortress bases, used to organize XXI Bomber Command before it deployed to the Western Pacific in 1944. It closed in the late 1940s and was turned over to civil control.

The airport is the site of the 1955 National Hot Rod Association U.S. Nationals, the first nationwide NHRA drag racing event.

=== Historical airline service ===
The first airline flights were in 1951, on Continental Airlines DC-3s flying a ten-stop route between Denver and Kansas City. In 1961 Central Airlines replaced Continental; in 1967 Central was merged into the original Frontier Airlines. In 1970 Frontier's Convair 580s were replaced by Air Midwest 14-seat Beechcraft 99s to Denver, Kansas City and Wichita. Air Midwest later upgraded to 17-seat Fairchild Swearingen Metroliners and in 1986 the carrier began operating for Eastern Airlines as an Eastern Express feeder carrier for Eastern's hub at Kansas City. In 1988 Eastern dismantled its Kansas City hub and Air Midwest entered into a new agreement with Braniff (1983-1990) as a Braniff Express feeder carrier as Braniff was now operating a hub at Kansas City. This only lasted for one year until Braniff had shut down and Air Midwest reverted to operating under their own brand. Flights to Denver were still flown as well. In 1991 Air Midwest entered into yet another agreement, this time with US Airways as a US Airways Express feeder carrier at Kansas City and Denver. Air Midwest ended the Denver flights in 1992 and Mesa Airlines, a United Express feeder for United Airlines' hub at Denver, began service using Beechcraft 1900s. In 1998 the service to Denver as United Express was transferred to Great Lakes Airlines flying Beech-1900Ds until 2000 when Denver service ended. (During much of the 1990s, Great Bend was served by both United Express to Denver and US Airways Express to Kansas City.) In 2007 Air Midwest ended their US Airways Express flights to Kansas City at which time Great Lakes reinstated service to Great Bend, flying to Kansas City and Denver. The Kansas City flights ended in 2010 and the Denver flights in 2014, ending Great Lakes service at Great Bend. SeaPort Airlines then began service with nine-seat Cessna 208 Caravan to Kansas City and Wichita, but the carrier shut down on January 16, 2016. Since then, Great Bend has not seen a scheduled airline.

== Facilities ==
The airport covers 1,887 acres (764 ha) at an elevation of 1,887 feet (575 m). It has two asphalt runways: 17/35 is 7,852 by 100 feet (2,393 × 30 m) and 11/29 is 4,706 by 75 feet (1,434 × 23 m).

In the year ending December 31, 2022, the airport had 8,775 aircraft operations, average 24 per day: 73% general aviation, 27% air taxi and <1% military. In December 2022, 48 aircraft were based at this airport: 37 single-engine, 7 multi-engine, 2 jet, 1 helicopter, and 1 glider.

Some former U.S. Army Air Force facilities were preserved in the airport, the site become the B-29 Memorial Plaza.

== Airline and non-stop destinations ==
After SeaPort Airlines abruptly ended service on January 16, 2016, the airport is currently without scheduled airline service.

=== Statistics ===
Carrier shares (Dec. 2015 - Nov. 2016)
Carrier	Passengers (arriving and departing)
SeaPort Airlines	40(100%)

Top domestic destinations (Dec. 2015 - Nov. 2016)
Rank	Airport	Passengers	Airline
1	Kansas City, MO	20	SeaPort

== See also ==
- List of airports in Kansas
