= Chetek Municipal–Southworth Airport =

Airport in Wisconsin, United States

Chetek Municipal - Southworth Airport
- IATA: none; ICAO: none; FAA LID: Y23

Summary
- Airport type: Public
- Owner: City of Chetek
- Serves: Chetek, Wisconsin
- Opened: October 1945
- Time zone: CST (UTC−06:00)
  - Summer (DST): CDT (UTC−05:00)
- Elevation AMSL: 1,056 ft (322 m)
- Coordinates: 45°18′23″N 091°38′13″W

Map
- Location of airport in Wisconsin Y23 (the United States)

Runways
Direction	Length		Surface
Direction	ft	m	Surface
17/35	3,401	1,036	Asphalt
7/25	1,490	454	Turf

Statistics
- Aircraft operations (2023): 7,240
- Based aircraft (2024): 47
- Source: Airport web page and FAA

Chetek Municipal - Southworth Airport (FAA LID: Y23), is a city-owned public-use airport located one nautical mile (2 km) southeast of the central business district of Chetek, a city in Barron County, Wisconsin, United States.

== Facilities and aircraft ==
Chetek Municipal - Southworth Airport covers an area of 92 acres (37 ha) at an elevation of 1,056 feet (322 m) above mean sea level. It has two runways: 17/35 with a 3,401 x 60 ft (1,036 x 18 m) asphalt pavement and 7/25 with a 1,490 x 120 ft (454 x 37 m) turf surface.

For the 12-month period ending July 3, 2023, the airport had 7,240 aircraft operations, an average of 19 per day: 99% general aviation and 1% air taxi. In July 2024, there were 47 aircraft based at this airport: 37 single-engine, 6 multi-engine and 4 ultralight.

== See also ==
- List of airports in Wisconsin
