= Barton Community College =

Public college in Great Bend, Kansas, US

- Motto: What Drives You?
- Type: Public community college
- Established: July 15, 1965
- President: Marcus Garstecki
- Students: 4,393 (Fall 2023)
- Location: Great Bend, Kansas, United States; 38°24′13″N 98°43′54″W
- Campus: 160 acres (0.65 km^{2})
- Colors: Royal blue and light gold
- Nickname: Cougars
- Website: www.bartonccc.edu

Barton Community College, previously Barton County Community College, is a public community college in Great Bend, Kansas. Its service area includes Barton, Ellsworth, Pawnee, Rush and Russell Counties, Stafford County north of US Highway 50, and northwestern Rice County.

== History ==
Barton Community College was founded on July 15, 1965, through an election by the people of Barton County, Kansas. Its first name was Barton County Junior College, which was later shortened to its current name, Barton Community College.

== Athletics ==
The school participates at the Division I level and is affiliated with the NJCAA (National Junior College Athletic Association). The school is also a member of the Kansas Jayhawk Community College Conference. American sprinter Tyson Gay, who holds the American record in the 100 meters, is a notable alumnus.

== Notable alumni ==
- Tabarie Henry, two-time Olympic Games sprinter
- Aleksandar Radojević, professional basketball player
- Kenny Williams, professional basketball player
- Doshia Woods, collegiate basketball coach
