= Great Bend, Kansas =

City in Barton County, Kansas

- City and County seat
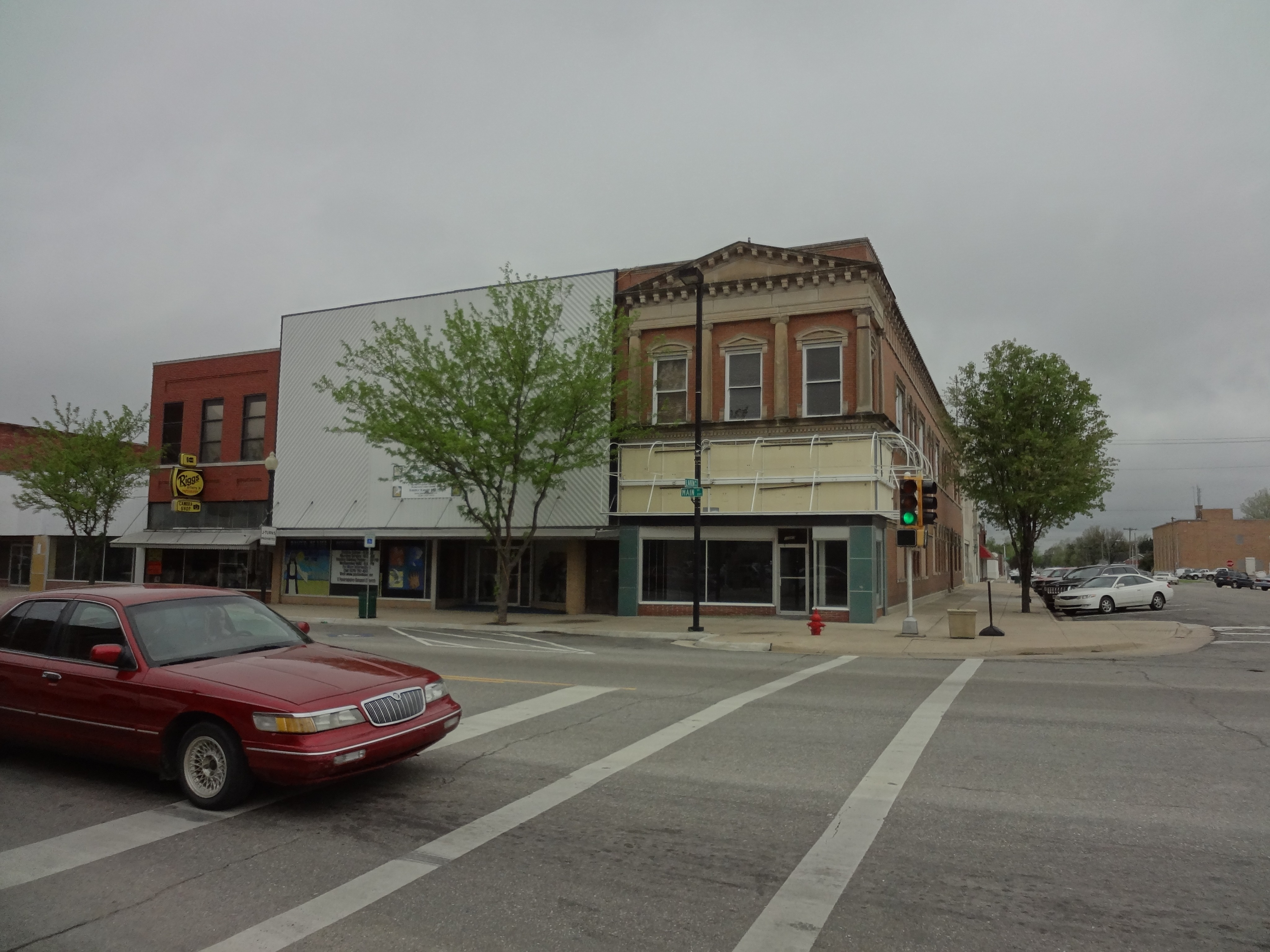
- Downtown Great Bend (2012)

- Location within Barton County and Kansas

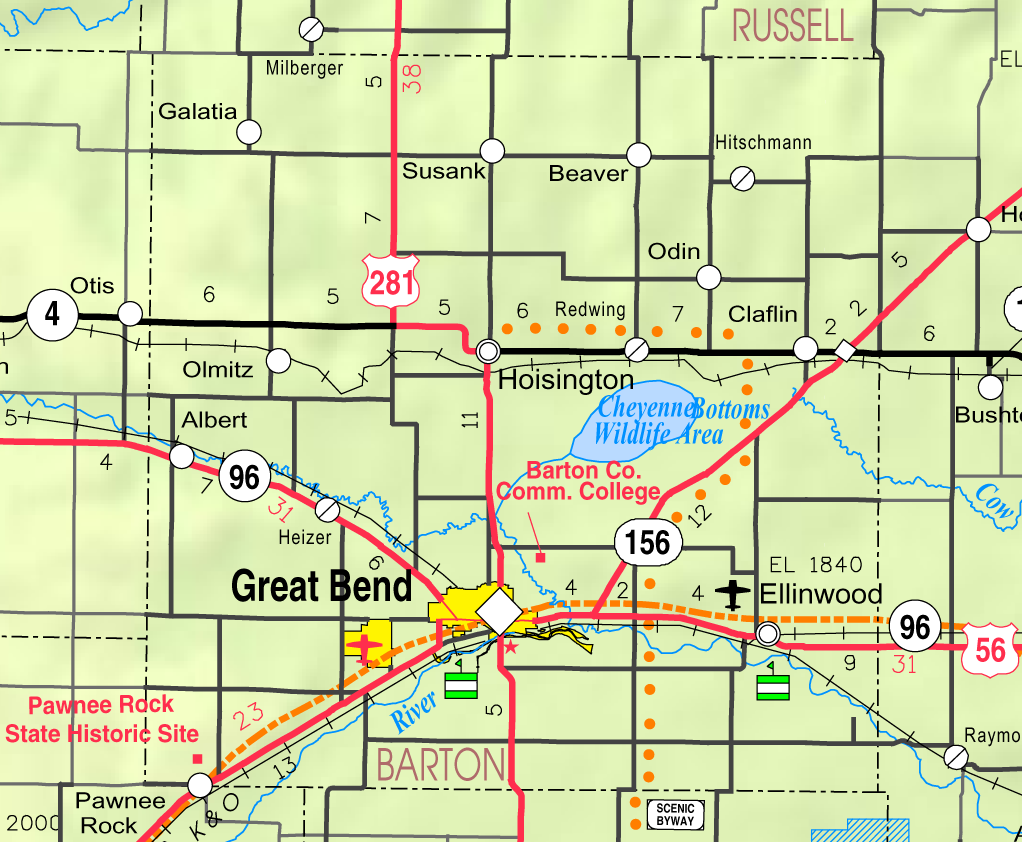
- KDOT map of Barton County (legend)
- Coordinates: 38°21′52″N 98°45′53″W
- Country: United States
- State: Kansas
- County: Barton
- Founded: 1871
- Incorporated: 1872
- Named for: Bend in Arkansas River

Area
  - Total: 10.63 sq mi (27.54 km^{2})
  - Land: 10.50 sq mi (27.19 km^{2})
  - Water: 0.14 sq mi (0.35 km^{2})
- Elevation: 1,850 ft (560 m)

Population (2020)
  - Total: 14,733
  - Density: 1,403/sq mi (541.9/km^{2})
- Time zone: UTC-6 (CST)
  - Summer (DST): UTC-5 (CDT)
- ZIP Code: 67530
- Area code: 620
- FIPS code: 20-28300
- GNIS ID: 475650
- Website: greatbendks.gov

Great Bend is a city in and the county seat of Barton County, Kansas, United States. It is named for its location at the point where the course of the Arkansas River bends east then southeast. As of the 2020 census, the population of the city was 14,733. It is home to Barton Community College.

== History ==
Prior to American settlement of the area, the site of Great Bend was located in the northern reaches of Kiowa territory. Claimed first by France as part of Louisiana and later acquired by the United States with the Louisiana Purchase in 1803, it lay within the area organized by the U.S. as Kansas Territory in 1854. Kansas became a state in 1861, and the state government delineated the surrounding area as Barton County in 1867.

The first settlers of the area arrived in 1870. Living in sod houses and dugouts, they worked as buffalo hunters since trampling by bison herds precluded crop farming. In 1871, the Great Bend Town Company, anticipating the westward construction of the Atchison, Topeka and Santa Fe Railroad, founded Great Bend at a site roughly three miles west of Fort Zarah on the Santa Fe Trail. They named the settlement after its location at the "great bend" in the Arkansas River where the river's course turns eastward. The town began to grow as more settlers arrived over the following year and opened several businesses.

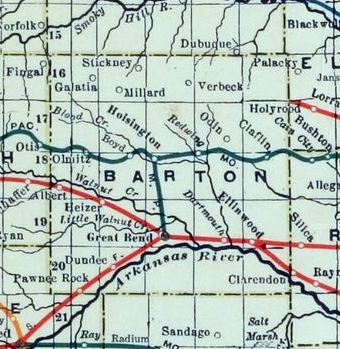
1915 railroad map of Barton County

The railroad reached Great Bend in July 1872, and an election at about the same time declared the town the permanent county seat. Great Bend was incorporated as a city soon thereafter. The county courthouse and the city's first public school were built the following year.

In 1873, following the arrival of the railroad, Great Bend became a shipping point for cattle. This stimulated local business but also transformed the city into a rowdy, violent cowtown. In 1876, the Kansas Legislature extended the legal "dead line" restricting the presence of Texas cattle 30 miles west of Barton County. The cattle trade moved westward accordingly, and the city became more peaceful.

Over the following decades, Great Bend continued to grow and modernize, becoming a center of area commerce. This was despite two disasters which struck the city: a downtown fire in 1878 and a smallpox outbreak in 1882 which resulted in a brief quarantine. In 1886, local speculators began to fund exploration for petroleum in the area. By 1930, the oil and gas industry brought more than $20 million annually to the county. More than 3,000 wells produced during the 1930s, and the influx of workers dramatically increased the city's population.

The U.S. Army Air Forces opened Great Bend Army Airfield west of the city in 1943. The base served as training facility for B-29 bomber aircraft personnel during World War II. After the war, the City of Great Bend acquired the base and repurposed it for civilian use as Great Bend Municipal Airport.

The city continued to grow through the 1950s, its population peaking at almost 17,000 in 1960. In 1973, the Fuller Brush Company relocated its production facilities to Great Bend, becoming one of the city's major employers. Despite a modest decline in population in recent decades, Great Bend continues to serve as a commercial center for central Kansas.

== Geography ==
Great Bend is located at the intersection of U.S. routes 56 and 281. Driving by highway, it is approximately 116 miles (187 km) northwest of Wichita and 60 miles (97 km) southwest of Hays.

Lying in the Great Bend Sand Prairie region of the Great Plains, the city is situated on the north side of the Arkansas River, where the river's course shifts from northeast to southeast. Dry Walnut Creek, a tributary of nearby Walnut Creek, flows east along the northern edge of the city. Cheyenne Bottoms, a large inland wetland, is located approximately 6 miles (9.7 km) to the northeast.

According to the United States Census Bureau, the city has a total area of 10.71 square miles (27.74 km^{2}), of which 10.60 square miles (27.45 km^{2}) is land and 0.11 square miles (0.28 km^{2}) is water.

=== Climate ===
Located near the convergence of North America's humid continental (Köppen: Dfa), humid subtropical (Köppen: Cfa), and semi-arid (Köppen: BSk) climate zones, Great Bend experiences hot summers and cold, dry winters. The hottest temperature recorded in Great Bend was 111 °F (43.9 °C) on July 11–13, 1954, June 27, 1980, June 30, 1980, and July 14, 1980, while the coldest temperature recorded was −21 °F (−29.4 °C) on December 22, 1989.

The high temperature reaches or exceeds 90 °F (32 °C) an average of 69.7 days a year and reaches or exceeds 100 °F (38 °C) an average of 12 days a year. The minimum temperature falls below the freezing point 32 °F (0 °C) an average of 119.5 days a year.

Climate data for Great Bend, Kansas, 1991–2020 normals, extremes 1948–present
Month	Jan	Feb	Mar	Apr	May	Jun	Jul	Aug	Sep	Oct	Nov	Dec	Year
Record high °F (°C)	79 (26)	88 (31)	93 (34)	101 (38)	102 (39)	111 (44)	111 (44)	110 (43)	106 (41)	98 (37)	80 (27)	79 (26)	111 (44)
Mean maximum °F (°C)	66.0 (18.9)	72.9 (22.7)	80.7 (27.1)	88.3 (31.3)	92.7 (33.7)	98.8 (37.1)	102.7 (39.3)	100.8 (38.2)	97.1 (36.2)	89.3 (31.8)	76.2 (24.6)	65.6 (18.7)	103.9 (39.9)
Mean daily maximum °F (°C)	42.5 (5.8)	47.0 (8.3)	57.7 (14.3)	67.6 (19.8)	76.4 (24.7)	86.7 (30.4)	91.3 (32.9)	89.0 (31.7)	81.7 (27.6)	69.4 (20.8)	55.1 (12.8)	43.5 (6.4)	67.3 (19.6)
Daily mean °F (°C)	30.3 (−0.9)	34.0 (1.1)	43.9 (6.6)	53.5 (11.9)	63.5 (17.5)	73.8 (23.2)	78.3 (25.7)	76.2 (24.6)	68.3 (20.2)	55.7 (13.2)	42.2 (5.7)	31.9 (−0.1)	54.3 (12.4)
Mean daily minimum °F (°C)	18.2 (−7.7)	21.0 (−6.1)	30.0 (−1.1)	39.3 (4.1)	50.7 (10.4)	60.9 (16.1)	65.2 (18.4)	63.4 (17.4)	54.9 (12.7)	41.9 (5.5)	29.3 (−1.5)	20.3 (−6.5)	41.3 (5.1)
Mean minimum °F (°C)	2.4 (−16.4)	5.6 (−14.7)	13.3 (−10.4)	24.9 (−3.9)	37.7 (3.2)	50.3 (10.2)	57.4 (14.1)	54.8 (12.7)	40.6 (4.8)	26.0 (−3.3)	14.4 (−9.8)	5.7 (−14.6)	−2.8 (−19.3)
Record low °F (°C)	−17 (−27)	−19 (−28)	−7 (−22)	14 (−10)	25 (−4)	39 (4)	45 (7)	45 (7)	29 (−2)	10 (−12)	−4 (−20)	−21 (−29)	−21 (−29)
Average precipitation inches (mm)	0.71 (18)	0.89 (23)	1.56 (40)	2.15 (55)	4.83 (123)	3.66 (93)	3.86 (98)	3.69 (94)	1.98 (50)	1.96 (50)	1.00 (25)	1.01 (26)	27.30 (693)
Average snowfall inches (cm)	2.2 (5.6)	2.6 (6.6)	2.3 (5.8)	0.3 (0.76)	0.0 (0.0)	0.0 (0.0)	0.0 (0.0)	0.0 (0.0)	0.0 (0.0)	0.1 (0.25)	1.7 (4.3)	2.3 (5.8)	11.5 (29.11)
Average precipitation days (≥ 0.01 in)	3.4	3.9	6.0	6.8	9.1	7.6	8.5	8.4	5.9	6.0	4.2	3.6	73.4
Average snowy days (≥ 0.1 in)	1.9	1.7	0.9	0.2	0.0	0.0	0.0	0.0	0.0	0.1	0.7	1.4	6.9
Source 1: NOAA
Source 2: National Weather Service

== Demographics ==
Historical population
Census	Pop.	Note	%±
1880	1,071		—
1890	2,450		128.8%
1900	2,470		0.8%
1910	4,622		87.1%
1920	4,460		−3.5%
1930	5,548		24.4%
1940	9,044		63.0%
1950	12,665		40.0%
1960	16,670		31.6%
1970	16,133		−3.2%
1980	16,608		2.9%
1990	15,427		−7.1%
2000	15,345		−0.5%
2010	15,995		4.2%
2020	14,733		−7.9%
2023 (est.)	14,372		−2.5%
U.S. Decennial Census; 2010-2020

=== 2020 census ===
As of the 2020 census, Great Bend had a population of 14,733, with 6,136 households and 3,690 families. The population density was 1,403.4 per square mile (541.9/km^{2}). There were 7,081 housing units at an average density of 674.5 per square mile (260.4/km^{2}). 99.7% of residents lived in urban areas, while 0.3% lived in rural areas.

24.7% of residents were under the age of 18, and 19.3% were 65 years of age or older. The median age was 38.6 years. For every 100 females there were 94.6 males, and for every 100 females age 18 and over there were 93.5 males age 18 and over.

There were 6,136 households in Great Bend, of which 29.4% had children under the age of 18 living in them. Of all households, 42.3% were married-couple households, 20.5% were households with a male householder and no spouse or partner present, and 30.3% were households with a female householder and no spouse or partner present. About 35.0% of all households were made up of individuals and 15.4% had someone living alone who was 65 years of age or older. The average household size was 2.4 and the average family size was 3.0.

There were 7,081 housing units, of which 13.3% were vacant. The homeowner vacancy rate was 2.4% and the rental vacancy rate was 16.1%.

Non-Hispanic White residents accounted for 70.47% of the population.

Racial composition as of the 2020 census
Race	Number	Percent
White	11,395	77.3%
Black or African American	228	1.5%
American Indian and Alaska Native	95	0.6%
Asian	53	0.4%
Native Hawaiian and Other Pacific Islander	1	0.0%
Some other race	1,615	11.0%
Two or more races	1,346	9.1%
Hispanic or Latino (of any race)	3,462	23.5%

=== 2016–2020 ACS estimates ===
The percent of those with a bachelor's degree or higher was estimated to be 14.8% of the population.

The 2016–2020 5-year American Community Survey estimates show that the median household income was $46,659 (with a margin of error of +/- $3,811) and the median family income was $64,453 (+/- $6,131). Males had a median income of $39,595 (+/- $4,131) versus $26,684 (+/- $4,324) for females. The median income for those above 16 years old was $32,273 (+/- $2,536). Approximately, 8.0% of families and 15.3% of the population were below the poverty line, including 18.0% of those under the age of 18 and 10.7% of those ages 65 or over.

=== 2010 census ===
As of the 2010 census, there were 15,995 people, 6,483 households, and 4,038 families residing in the city. The population density was 1,509.0 inhabitants per square mile (582.6/km^{2}). There were 7,113 housing units at an average density of 671.0 per square mile (259.1/km^{2}). The racial makeup of the city was 84.0% White, 1.7% African American, 0.6% American Indian, 0.2% Asian, 0.1% Pacific Islander, 11.0% from other races, and 2.3% from two or more races. Hispanics and Latinos of any race were 19.8% of the population.

There were 6,483 households, of which 32.2% had children under the age of 18 living with them, 47.4% were married couples living together, 10.6% had a female householder with no husband present, 4.3% had a male householder with no wife present, and 37.7% were non-families. 32.6% of all households were made up of individuals, and 13.4% had someone living alone who was 65 years of age or older. The average household size was 2.41 and the average family size was 3.04.

The median age in the city was 36.7 years. 26.2% of residents were under the age of 18; 9.2% were between the ages of 18 and 24; 23.5% were from 25 to 44; 24.5% were from 45 to 64; and 16.6% were 65 years of age or older. The gender makeup of the city was 48.5% male and 51.5% female.

As of 2010, the median income for a household was $42,293, and the median income for a family was $46,969. Males had a median income of $33,623 versus $25,038 for females. The per capita income for the city was $24,529. About 10.2% of families and 13.7% of the population were below the poverty line, including 15.7% of those under age 18 and 7.7% of those age 65 or over.

== Economy ==
Agriculture is the predominant industry in Great Bend, and its grain elevators are visible from miles away. The oil industry flourished from about 1930–1960. There was even an oil well in the city park. But this industry has been on the decline for years. Cattle raising is also an important source of income for many people.

As of 2012, 66.5% of the population over the age of 16 were in the labor force. 0.0% were in the armed forces, and 66.5% were in the civilian labor force with 61.0% employed and 5.5% unemployed. The composition, by occupation, of the employed civilian labor force was: 30.2% in management, business, science, and arts; 27.8% in sales and office occupations; 19.2% in service occupations; 9.6% in natural resources, construction, and maintenance; 13.3% in production, transportation, and material moving. The four industries employing the largest percentages of the working civilian labor force were: educational services, health care, and social assistance (27.3%); retail trade (11.9%); manufacturing (9.8%); and arts, entertainment, recreation, and accommodation and food services (9.8%). Great Bend Public Schools and Barton Community College are the city's largest employers. Other major employers include local government, local hospitals, Wal-Mart, Superior Essex, and Fuller Brush Company.

The cost of living in Great Bend is relatively low; compared to a U.S. average of 100, the cost of living index for the city is 79.4. As of 2012, the median home value in the city was $78,300, the median selected monthly owner cost was $979 for housing units with a mortgage and $400 for those without, and the median gross rent was $539.

== Government ==
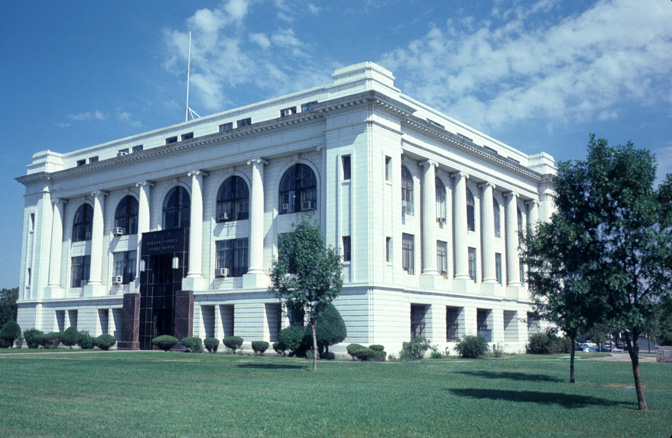
Barton County Courthouse in Great Bend

Great Bend is a city of the second class with a mayor-council form of government. The city council consists of eight members, two elected from each city ward for two-year terms. The mayor is elected at-large, also for a two-year term. The mayor and city council together constitute the city's Governing Body which sets goals, establishes policies, and approves all ordinances and resolutions. The council meets on the first and third Monday of each month.

As the county seat, Great Bend is the administrative center of Barton County. The county courthouse is located downtown, and most departments of the county government base their operations in the city.

Great Bend lies within Kansas's 1st U.S. Congressional District. For the purposes of representation in the Kansas Legislature, the city is located in the 33rd district of the Kansas Senate and the 112th district of the Kansas House of Representatives.

== Education ==
=== Colleges ===
Barton Community College, a two-year public college, is located approximately three miles northeast of Great Bend.

=== Public schools ===
Great Bend USD 428 public school district serves approximately 3,000 students and operates eight schools in the city:

- Great Bend High School (9–12)
- Great Bend Middle School (7–8)
- Eisenhower Elementary School (K–6)
- Jefferson Elementary School (K–6)
- Lincoln Elementary School (K–6)
- Park Elementary School (K–6)
- Riley Elementary School (PreK-6)
- Helping Hands Preschool (PreK)

=== Private schools ===
The Roman Catholic Diocese of Dodge City oversees the Holy Family School (PreK–6). There is also one non-denominational Christian school in the city, Central Kansas Christian Academy (K-8).

== Infrastructure ==
=== Transportation ===
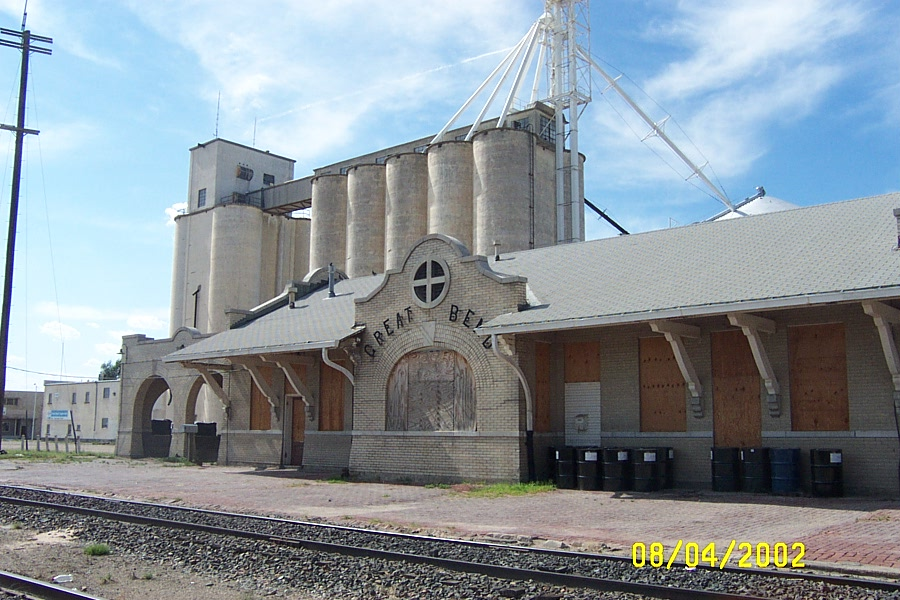
Downtown grain elevator and abandoned Santa Fe railroad station

Great Bend was located on the National Old Trails Road, also known as the Ocean-to-Ocean Highway, that was established in 1912. Currently, two U.S. Highways and two Kansas state highways pass through the city. U.S. Route 281 runs north–south through Great Bend, intersecting U.S. Route 56, K-96, and K-156, which run concurrently east–west through the city. K-96 splits from U.S. 56 and K-156 in western Great Bend, exiting the city to the northwest. U.S. 56 and K-156 continue concurrently west, then turn south and ultimately southwest.

Great Bend Municipal Airport is located approximately 2 miles (3.2 km) west of the city and is used primarily for general aviation.

A Kansas and Oklahoma Railroad line runs east–west through the city with a second line branching off to the northwest, paralleled by K-96. As of 2025, the nearest passenger rail station is located in Hutchinson, where Amtrak's Southwest Chief stops once daily on a route from Chicago to Los Angeles.

The city provides dial-a-ride transit on weekdays through CAB and Mini-Bus programs.

=== Utilities ===
The city government's Public Works Department is responsible for water distribution, waste water treatment, and sewer maintenance. One of the few cities in the area not to have a water treatment plant or water tower, Great Bend obtains its water supply directly from ten wells located throughout the city. Waste water is treated and recycled at the city's Wastewater Treatment Facility and then emptied into the Arkansas River. Two regional energy cooperatives, Midwest Energy, Inc. and Wheatland Electric, provide electric power. Local residents primarily use natural gas for heating fuel; Midwest Energy and Kansas Gas Service both provide natural gas service.

=== Health care ===
There is one primary medical facility in the city. Great Bend Regional Hospital, a 33-bed general medical and surgical facility, is the city's sole hospital. St. Rose Ambulatory & Surgery Center, formerly Central Kansas Medical Center, was an outpatient care facility affiliated with Catholic Health Initiatives. St. Rose Ambulatory & Surgery Center was closed and demolished in 2015.

== Media ==
The Great Bend Tribune is the city's daily newspaper with a circulation of over 6,200 copies.

The Interrobang was the student newspaper at the Great Bend-based Barton Community College.

Great Bend is a center of broadcast media for central Kansas. Two AM and ten FM radio stations are licensed to and/or broadcast from the city. Two television stations, NBC-affiliated KSNC and ABC-affiliated KGBD-LD, also broadcast from the city. Both are satellite stations of their respective affiliates in Wichita as Great Bend is part of the Wichita-Hutchinson, Kansas television market.

== Parks and recreation ==
The city government's Park Department maintains 10 parks in the city. The two largest are Brit Spaugh Park and Veteran's Memorial Park. Located in the north-central part of the city, Brit Spaugh Park includes the Great Bend Zoo, the Wetlands Aquatic Center, two softball fields, horseshoe courts, picnic areas, playgrounds, a skateboarding area, and a BMX track. Veteran's Park is located in the northwestern part of the city and includes an 18-hole disc golf course, a fishing lake with limited boating, sand volleyball, ballfields, a playground, and walking trails. The department also maintains hiking and biking trails along flood control levies around the city along with Stone Lake, a 43-acre (17 ha) fishing lake immediately south of the city.

The Club at StoneRidge, located on the northern edge of the city, includes a private, 18-hole golf course that opened in 1940. A second 18-hole course, the Lake Barton Golf Course, lies approximately 5 miles (8.0 km) north of the city.

== Culture ==
=== Arts and music ===
From 1947 to 1989, Great Bend was the home of the Argonne Rebels Drum and Bugle Corps. Under the direction of Glenn and Sandra Opie, the corps achieved national fame, most notably winning the American Legion national championships in 1971, 1972, and 1973. The Rebels were one of the thirteen founding member corps of Drum Corps International, finishing in 5th place in 1972 and 11th in 1973.

=== Points of interest ===
- The Barton County Historical Society Museum and Village is located in Great Bend.
- The Great Bend Zoo and Raptor Center, founded in 1952, contains over 60 species of animals.

=== Sports ===
Greyhound racing got its start in the United States in the bottoms in 1886 during a formal coursing event.

Great Bend was home to minor league baseball. The Great Bend Millers team was based in Great Bend in 1905 and from 1909 to 1914. The Millers played as members of the Class D level Kansas State League in 1905 and from 1909 to 1911, the Central Kansas League in 1912 and the Kansas State League in 1913 and 1914. Great Bend won three consecutive league championships from 1911 to 1913. In 2016, the Great Bend Boom played as members of the Independent level Pecos League.

The first nationwide NHRA sponsored event called "the Nationals" was held in 1955, in Great Bend, Kansas at the Great Bend Municipal Airport.

== Notable people ==
Notable individuals who were born in and/or have lived in Great Bend include jazz singer and pianist Karrin Allyson (1963– ), co-inventor of the integrated circuit (IC) and 2000 Nobel Prize laureate in physics Jack Kilby (1923–2005), and 1952 gold medal-winning U.S. Olympic basketball player John Keller (1928–2000).

== See also ==
- Great Bend Zoo
- Santa Fe Trail
- National Old Trails Road
