= 2024 Senior Bowl =

American college football all-star game

2024 Reese's Senior Bowl
- 75th Senior Bowl
National Team	American Team
16	7
Head coach: Jeff Ulbrich (New York Jets)	Head coach: Terrell Williams (Tennessee Titans)
	1	2	3	4	Total
National	7	0	6	3	16
American	7	0	0	0	7
- Date: February 3, 2024
- Season: 2023
- Stadium: Hancock Whitney Stadium
- Location: Mobile, Alabama
- MVP: Spencer Rattler (QB, South Carolina)
- Referee: Scott Walker (SEC)

United States TV coverage
- Network: NFL Network
- Announcers: Andrew Siciliano, Daniel Jeremiah, Charles Davis

The 2024 Senior Bowl was a college football all-star game played on February 3, 2024, at Hancock Whitney Stadium located in Mobile, Alabama. The game featured prospects for the upcoming 2024 draft of the professional National Football League (NFL), mostly coming from the NCAA Division I Football Bowl Subdivision (FBS). It was one of the 2023–24 bowl games concluding the 2023 FBS football season. The game began at approximately 12:00 p.m. Central Time and was officially known as the Reese's Senior Bowl via sponsorship from Reese's Peanut Butter Cups. Television coverage was provided by NFL Network.

== Players ==
=== National team ===
Full roster online .

No.	Player	Position	HT/WT	College	Notes
78	Isaiah Adams	G	6'5/320	Illinois	
22	Rasheen Ali	RB	6'0/209	Marshall	did not play
82	Javon Baker	WR	6'1/208	UCF	
89	A. J. Barner	TE	6'6/251	Michigan	
8	Cole Bishop	S	6'2/207	Utah	
49	Austin Booker	DE	6'6/245	Kansas	
63	Tanor Bortolini	C	6'4/310	Wisconsin	
47	Peter Bowden	LS	6'2/242	Wisconsin	
90	DeWayne Carter	DE	6'3/305	Duke	
2	Jacob Cowing	WR	5'11/175	Arizona	did not play
21	Isaiah Davis	RB	6'1/220	South Dakota State (FCS)	
91	Tyler Davis	DT	6'2/300	Clemson	did not play
22	Johnny Dixon	C B	6'0/191	Penn State	did not play
97	Brandon Dorlus	DE	6'3/290	Oregon	did not play
0	Willie Drew	S	6'0/185	Virginia State (DII)	
52	Ethan Driskell	G	6'9/329	Marshall	
65	Kingsley Eguakun	C	6'3/300	Florida	
75	Zach Frazier	C	6'3/310	West Virginia	did not play
72	Taliese Fuaga	OT	6'6/334	Oregon State	did not play
33	Cedric Gray	ILB	6'3/235	North Carolina	
51	Mike Hall Jr.	DT	6'2/280	Ohio State	did not play
95	Gabe Hall	DT	6'6/287	Baylor	
32	Jaylen Harrell	DE	6'4/242	Michigan	
2	Cam Hart	CB	6'2/202	Notre Dame	
5	Sam Hartman	QB	6'1/210	Notre Dame	7/25, 69 yards, INT
70	LaDarius Henderson	OT	6'4/310	Michigan	did not play
1	Jontrey Hunter	CB	6'2/240	Georgia State	
20	Adisa Isaac	OLB	6'4/254	Penn State	
85	Brennan Jackson	OLB	6'4/264	Washington State	did not play
10	Khyree Jackson	CB	6'3/195	Oregon	did not play
84	Theo Johnson	TE	6'6/264	Penn State	
43	Joshua Karty	K	6'2/208	Stanford	3/3 FG, 1/1 XP
50	Trevor Keegan	G	6'6/320	Michigan	did not play
99	Marshawn Kneeland	DE	6'3/268	Western Michigan	1 tackle, 0.5 sacks
15	Laiatu Latu	DE	6'5/265	UCLA	did not play
40	Dylan Laube	RB	5'10/208	New Hampshire (FCS)	
73	Sataoa Laumea	G	6'4/311	Utah	
0	MarShawn Lloyd	RB	5'9/210	USC	did not play
12	Luke McCaffrey	WR	6'2/195	Rice	
16	Max Melton	CB	6'0/190	Rutgers	did not play
7	Quinyon Mitchell	CB	6'0/196	Toledo	did not play
77	Jordan Morgan	OT	6'5/325	Arizona	
10	Bo Nix	QB	6'2/217	Oregon	4/5, 21 yards, TD
28	Kitan Oladapo	SS	6'1/217	Oregon State	
11	Ricky Pearsall	WR	6'1/190	Florida	did not play
9	Michael Penix Jr.	QB	6'3/213	Washington	did not play
58	Jackson Powers-Johnson	C	6'3/320	Oregon	did not play
71	Dominick Puni	G	6'5/320	Kansas	
88	Keith Randolph Jr.	DT	6'5/300	Illinois	
13	Brenden Rice	WR	6'3/210	USC	did not play
76	Roger Rosengarten	OT	6'6/300	Washington	
6	Chau Smith-Wade	CB	5'11/176	Washington State	INT, Defensive MVP
40	Javon Solomon	LB	6'2/249	Troy	
88	Brevyn Spann-Ford	TE	6'7/270	Minnesota	TD
55	Kingsley Suamataia	OT	6'6/325	BYU	
48	Edefuan Ulofoshio	LB	6'1/236	Washington	
34	Sione Vaki	S	6'0/208	Utah	did not play
28	Kimani Vidal	RB	5'8/215	Troy	
14	Devontez Walker	WR	6'3/200	North Carolina	
3	Evan Williams	S	6'1/205	Oregon	
11	Payton Wilson	LB	6'4/238	NC State	did not play
1	Roman Wilson	WR	6'0/192	Michigan	did not play

=== American team ===
Full roster online .

No.	Player	Position	HT/WT	College	Notes
7	Kris Abrams-Draine	DB	5'11/178	Missouri	
9	Emani Bailey	RB	5'9/207	TCU	10 carries, 53 yards, 4 catches, 34 yards
6	Jaheim Bell	TE	6'3/239	Florida State	
27	JD Bertrand	LB	6'1/230	Notre Dame	
25	Beau Brade	DB	6'1/210	Maryland	
12	Carter Bradley	QB	6'3/216	South Alabama	
41	Chris Braswell	DL	6'3/255	Alabama	
19	Jarvis Brownlee Jr.	DB	6'0/190	Louisville	
22	Javon Bullard	DB	5'11/195	Georgia	
9	Nelson Ceaser	DL	6'3/250	Houston	
54	Javion Cohen	OL	6'4/305	Miami	
95	Myles Cole	DL	6'6/280	Texas Tech	
77	Brandon Coleman	OL	6'6/320	TCU	
98	Jaden Crumedy	DL	6'5/305	Mississippi State	
21	Ray Davis	RB	5'10/216	Kentucky	
92	Justin Eboigbe	DL	6'5/292	Alabama	
23	Daijun Edwards	RB	5'10/201	Georgia	
55	Braden Fiske	DL	6'5/297	Florida State	4 tackles, 0.5 sacks. Played for the National Team.
71	Jermey Flax	OL	6'6/325	Kentucky	
13	Ryan Flournoy	WR	6'2/197	Southeast Missouri State (FCS)	
75	Javon Foster	OL	6'5/319	Missouri	
74	Delmar Glaze	OL	6'5/328	Maryland	
60	Tyler Guyton	OL	6'7/327	Oklahoma	
50	Marcus Harris	DL	6'3/295	Auburn	
63	Christian Haynes	OL	6'2/313	UConn	
13	Jalyx Hunt	LB	6'4/248	Houston Christian (FCS)	
4	Jha'Quan Jackson	WR	5'11/185	Tulane	
3	McKinnley Jackson	DL	6'2/325	Texas A&M	
4	D.J. James	DB	6'1/164	Auburn	
28	Javontae Jean-Baptiste	DL	6'4/255	Notre Dame	
99	Jordan Jefferson	DL	6'4/317	LSU	
11	Carlton Johnson	DB	6'0/165	Fresno State	
33	Cedric Johnson	DL	6'3/265	Ole Miss	
70	Christian Jones	OL	6'6/321	Texas	
29	Elijah Jones	DB	6'2/184	Boston College	
24	Kamren Kinchens	DB	6'0/205	Miami	
40	Tyrice Knight	LB	6'2/235	UTEP	
17	Xavier Legette	WR	6'3/227	South Carolina	
55	Beaux Limmer	OL	6'5/307	Arkansas	
84	Ladd McConkey	WR	6'0/185	Georgia	
31	Austin McNamara	P	6'4/210	Texas Tech	
5	Joe Milton	QB	6'5/235	Tennessee	INT
56	William Mote	LS	6'2/230	Georgia	
27	Malik Mustapha	DB	5'11/207	Wake Forest	
0	Andru Phillips	DB	6'0/187	Kentucky	
7	Michael Pratt	QB	6'3/220	Tulane	
1	Nehemiah Pritchett	DB	6'1/184	Auburn	
2	Spencer Rattler	QB	6'1/217	South Carolina	4/4, 65 yards, TD (Game MVP)
73	Andrew Raym	OL	6'4/309	Oklahoma	
16	Will Reichard	K	6'1/194	Alabama	
6	Darius Robinson	DL	6'5/296	Missouri	
64	Layden Robinson	OL	6'4/315	Texas A&M	
1	Marcus Rosemy-Jacksaint	WR	6'2/195	Georgia	
28	Cody Schrader	RB	5'9/214	Missouri	
81	Ben Sinnott	TE	6'4/245	Kansas State	
0	Ainias Smith	WR	5'10/200	Texas A&M	
47	Tykee Smith	DB	5'10/205	Georgia	
93	T'Vondre Sweat	DL	6'4/362	Texas	
3	Jamari Thrash	WR	6'1/185	Louisville	
69	Charles Turner III	OL	6'4/300	LSU	
32	Trevin Wallace	LB	6'2/241	Kentucky	
14	Nathaniel Watson	LB	6'2/245	Mississippi State	
96	Eric Watts	DL	6'5/277	UConn	
19	Jared Wiley	TE	6'7/260	TCU	
8	Michael Wiley	RB	6'0/215	Arizona	
20	James Williams	LB	6'5/215	Miami	
14	Johnny Wilson	WR	6'7/237	Florida State	
