= 2023 Notre Dame Fighting Irish football team =

American college football season

2023 Notre Dame Fighting Irish football

Sun Bowl champion

Sun Bowl, W 40–8 vs. Oregon State
- Conference: Independent

Ranking
- Coaches: No. 14
- AP: No. 14
- Record: 10–3
- Head coach: Marcus Freeman (2nd season)
- Offensive coordinator: Gerad Parker (1st season)
- Offensive scheme: Multiple
- Defensive coordinator: Al Golden (2nd season)
- Base defense: 4–3
- MVP: Sam Hartman
- Captains: Joe Alt; JD Bertrand; Cam Hart; Sam Hartman
- Home stadium: Notre Dame Stadium

Uniform
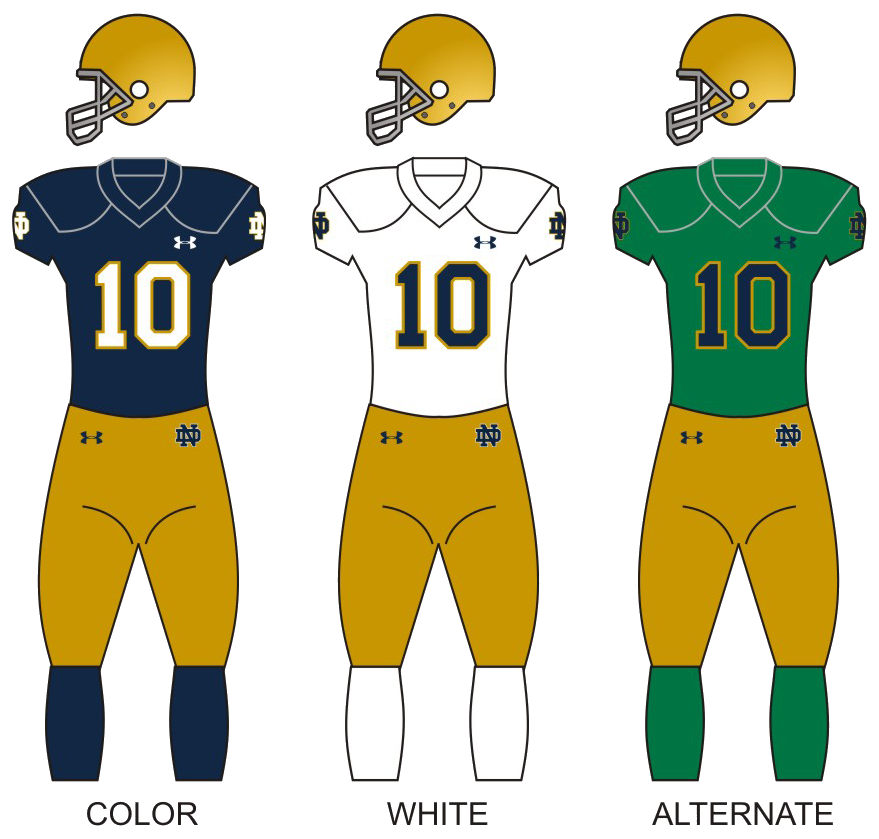

2023 NCAA Division I FBS independents football records
	Conf.			Overall
Team	W		L	W		L
No. 14 Notre Dame		–		10	–	3
Army		–		6	–	6
UConn		–		3	–	9
UMass		–		3	–	9
Rankings from AP Poll

The 2023 Notre Dame Fighting Irish football team was an American football team that represented the University of Notre Dame as an independent during the 2023 NCAA Division I FBS football season. In their second year under head coach Marcus Freeman, the Irish compiled a 10–3 record, outscored opponents by a total of 509 to 207, and were ranked No. 14 in both the final AP and Coaches Polls. They played five games against ranked opponents, losing to No. 6 Ohio State and No. 25 Louisville, and defeating No. 17 Duke, No. 10 USC, and No. 21 Oregon State, the latter in the Sun Bowl.

Quarterback Sam Hartman tallied 2,689 passing yards and 24 passing touchdowns and was selected as the team's most valuable player. The team's other statistical leaders included running back Audric Estime (1,341 rushing yards, 108 points scored), running back Chris Tyree (484 receiving yards), and linebacker JD Bertrand (76 total tackles). Offensive tackle Joe Alt and safety Xavier Watts were consensus first-team picks on the 2023 All-America college football team.

The team played its home games at Notre Dame Stadium in Notre Dame, Indiana, drawing an average home attendance of 77,622.

== Offseason ==
=== Coaching changes ===
The following coaches left the program:

- Offensive coordinator and quarterbacks coach Tommy Rees left for the same positions at Alabama.
- Special teams coordinator Brian Mason left for the same position with the Indianapolis Colts of the NFL.
- Offensive line coach Harry Hiestand announced his retirement.
- Director of football performance Matt Balis resigned.

The following coaches were hired:

- Marty Biagi was hired from Ole Miss to be the special teams coordinator.
- Gino Guidugli was hired from Cincinnati to be the quarterbacks coach.
- Joe Rudolph was hired from Virginia Tech to be the offensive line coach.

=== Departures ===
==== NFL ====
Player	Position	Team	Round	Pick
Michael Mayer	TE	Las Vegas Raiders	2	35
Isaiah Foskey	DL	New Orleans Saints	2	40
Jarrett Patterson	OL	Houston Texans	6	201
Jayson Ademilola	DL	Jacksonville Jaguars	Undrafted free agent	
Avery Davis	WR	Detroit Lions	Undrafted free agent	
Blake Grupe	K	New Orleans Saints	Undrafted free agent	
Brandon Joseph	S	Detroit Lions	Undrafted free agent	
Chris Smith	DL	Detroit Lions	Undrafted free agent	
Justin Ademilola	DL	Green Bay Packers	Rookie minicamp invite	
Bo Bauer	LB	Seattle Seahawks	Rookie minicamp invite	
TaRiq Bracy	CB	Houston Texans	Rookie minicamp invite	
Josh Lugg	OL	Chicago Bears	Rookie minicamp invite	

==== Transfers out ====
- CB Jayden Bellamy transferred to Syracuse.
- TE Cane Berrong transferred to Coastal Carolina.
- QB Tyler Buchner transferred to Alabama.
- RB Logan Diggs transferred to LSU.
- DL Osita Ekwonu transferred to Charlotte.
- OL Caleb Johnson transferred to SMU.
- LB Prince Kollie transferred to Vanderbilt.
- DL Jacob Lacey transferred to Oklahoma.
- TE Barret Liebentritt transferred to Nebraska; previously walk-on.
- QB Drew Pyne transferred to Arizona State.
- WR Lorenzo Styles Jr. transferred to Ohio State.
- WR Joe Wilkins Jr. transferred to Miami (OH).

==== Retirements ====
- K Josh Bryan
- DL Alexander Ehrensberger
- S Mike Graves
- S Houston Griffith
- WR Braden Lenzy
- WR Greg Mailey
- LB Christian Opperman
- LS Alex Peitsch
- QB Ron Powlus III
- WR Conor Ratigan
- CB Philip Riley
- LB Will Schweitzer
- P Jon Sot
- S Justin Walters

=== Additions ===
==== Transfers in ====
- S Antonio Carter II transferred in from Rhode Island.
- RB Devyn Ford transferred in from Penn State.
- S Thomas Harper transferred in from Oklahoma State.
- QB Sam Hartman transferred in from Wake Forest.
- DL Javontae Jean-Baptiste transferred in from Ohio State.
- K Spencer Shrader transferred in from South Florida.
- WR Kaleb Smith transferred in from Virginia Tech; retired before start of season.

==== Walk-on transfers in ====
- DL Cole Aubrey transferred in from Princeton.
- P Ben Krimm transferred in from Penn.
- DL Grant Ristoff transferred in from Penn.

==== Recruiting ====
College recruiting (2023)
Name	Hometown	School	Height	Weight	Commit date
Sullivan Absher; OL	Belmont, NC	South Point (NC) Belmont	6 ft 5 in (1.96 m)	309 lb (140 kg)	
Sullivan Absher; OL	Recruit ratings: Rivals: 247Sports: ESPN: (80)				
Jaiden Ausberry; LB	Baton Rouge, LA	University Lab (LA) Baton Rouge	6 ft 0 in (1.83 m)	210 lb (95 kg)	
Jaiden Ausberry; LB	Recruit ratings: Rivals: 247Sports: ESPN: (86)				
Micah Bell; CB	Houston, TX	Kinkaid (TX) Houston	5 ft 10 in (1.78 m)	170 lb (77 kg)	
Micah Bell; CB	Recruit ratings: Rivals: 247Sports: ESPN: (84)				
Drayk Bowen; LB	St. John, IN	Andrean (IN) Merrillville	6 ft 2 in (1.88 m)	232 lb (105 kg)	
Drayk Bowen; LB	Recruit ratings: Rivals: 247Sports: ESPN: (85)				
Cooper Flanagan; TE	Pleasant Hill, CA	De La Salle (CA) Concord	6 ft 5 in (1.96 m)	228 lb (103 kg)	
Cooper Flanagan; TE	Recruit ratings: Rivals: 247Sports: ESPN: (81)				
Rico Flores Jr. WR	North Highlands, CA	Folsom (CA)	6 ft 1 in (1.85 m)	190 lb (86 kg)	
Rico Flores Jr. WR	Recruit ratings: Rivals: 247Sports: ESPN: (82)				
Christian Gray; CB	St. Louis, MO	De Smet (MO) St. Louis	6 ft 0 in (1.83 m)	175 lb (79 kg)	
Christian Gray; CB	Recruit ratings: Rivals: 247Sports: ESPN: (83)				
Jaden Greathouse; WR	Austin, TX	Westlake (TX) Austin	6 ft 2 in (1.88 m)	220 lb (100 kg)	
Jaden Greathouse; WR	Recruit ratings: Rivals: 247Sports: ESPN: (84)				
Devan Houstan; DL	Mississauga, ON	St. James (MD) Hagerstown	6 ft 5 in (1.96 m)	285 lb (129 kg)	
Devan Houstan; DL	Recruit ratings: Rivals: 247Sports: ESPN: (82)				
Charles Jagusah; OL	Rock Island, IL	Alleman (IL) Rock Island	6 ft 6 in (1.98 m)	308 lb (140 kg)	
Charles Jagusah; OL	Recruit ratings: Rivals: 247Sports: ESPN: (86)				
Braylon James; WR	Round Rock, TX	Stony Point (TX) Round Rock	6 ft 2 in (1.88 m)	185 lb (84 kg)	
Braylon James; WR	Recruit ratings: Rivals: 247Sports: ESPN: (86)				
Jeremiyah Love; RB	St. Louis, MO	Christian Brothers (MO) St. Louis	6 ft 0 in (1.83 m)	190 lb (86 kg)	
Jeremiyah Love; RB	Recruit ratings: Rivals: 247Sports: ESPN: (84)				
Kenny Minchey; QB	Hendersonville, TN	Pope John Paul II (TN) Hendersonville	6 ft 2 in (1.88 m)	215 lb (98 kg)	
Kenny Minchey; QB	Recruit ratings: Rivals: 247Sports: ESPN: (82)				
Ben Minich; S	West Chester, OH	Lakota (OH) West Chester	5 ft 11 in (1.80 m)	185 lb (84 kg)	
Ben Minich; S	Recruit ratings: Rivals: 247Sports: ESPN: (80)				
Armel Mukam; DL	La Prairie, QC	Woodberry Forest (VA)	6 ft 4 in (1.93 m)	255 lb (116 kg)	
Armel Mukam; DL	Recruit ratings: Rivals: 247Sports: ESPN: (78)				
Joe Otting; OL	Topeka, KS	Hayden (KS) Topeka	6 ft 4 in (1.93 m)	275 lb (125 kg)	
Joe Otting; OL	Recruit ratings: Rivals: 247Sports: ESPN: (78)				
Sam Pendleton; OL	Lawsonville, NC	Reagan (NC) Pfafftown	6 ft 4 in (1.93 m)	305 lb (138 kg)	
Sam Pendleton; OL	Recruit ratings: Rivals: 247Sports: ESPN: (79)				
Adon Shuler; S	Irvington, NJ	Irvington (NJ)	6 ft 0 in (1.83 m)	197 lb (89 kg)	
Adon Shuler; S	Recruit ratings: Rivals: 247Sports: ESPN: (81)				
KK Smith; WR	Frisco, TX	Reedy (TX) Frisco	6 ft 0 in (1.83 m)	175 lb (79 kg)	
KK Smith; WR	Recruit ratings: Rivals: 247Sports: ESPN: (78)				
Chris Terek; OL	Glen Ellyn, IL	Glenbard West (IL) Glen Ellyn	6 ft 5 in (1.96 m)	310 lb (140 kg)	
Chris Terek; OL	Recruit ratings: Rivals: 247Sports: ESPN: (77)				
Boubacar Traore; DL	Boston, MA	Catholic Memorial (MA) West Roxbury	6 ft 5 in (1.96 m)	245 lb (111 kg)	
Boubacar Traore; DL	Recruit ratings: Rivals: 247Sports: ESPN: (82)				
Brenan Vernon; DL	Mentor, OH	Mentor (OH)	6 ft 5 in (1.96 m)	275 lb (125 kg)	
Brenan Vernon; DL	Recruit ratings: Rivals: 247Sports: ESPN: (84)				
Preston Zinter; LB	North Andover, MA	Central Catholic (MA) Lawrence	6 ft 3 in (1.91 m)	215 lb (98 kg)	
Preston Zinter; LB	Recruit ratings: Rivals: 247Sports: ESPN: (78)				
Overall recruit ranking: Rivals: 8 247Sports: 8 ESPN: 6
Note: In many cases, Scout, Rivals, 247Sports, On3, and ESPN may conflict in their listings of height and weight.; In these cases, the average was taken. ESPN grades are on a 100-point scale.; Sources: "Rivals commits". Rivals.; "ESPN commits". ESPN.; "2023 Team Ranking". Rivals.com.; "247Sports commits". 247Sports.

==== New walk-ons ====
- QB Dylan Devezin
- K Marcello Diomede
- WR Jordan Faison (on lacrosse scholarship; earned football scholarship on October 9)
- TE Henry Garrity
- LS Andrew Kros
- LB Jerry Rullo
- S Luke Talich
- WR Alex Whitman

== Schedule ==
Date	Time	Opponent	Rank	Site	TV	Result	Attendance
August 26	2:30 p.m.	vs. Navy	No. 13	Aviva Stadium; Dublin, Ireland (Aer Lingus College Football Classic, rivalry)	NBC	W 42–3	49,000
September 2	3:30 p.m.	Tennessee State	No. 13	Notre Dame Stadium; Notre Dame, IN	NBC	W 56–3	77,622
September 9	12:00 p.m.	at NC State	No. 10	Carter–Finley Stadium; Raleigh, NC	ABC	W 45–24	56,919
September 16	2:30 p.m.	Central Michigan	No. 9	Notre Dame Stadium; Notre Dame, IN	Peacock	W 41–17	77,622
September 23	7:30 p.m.	No. 6 Ohio State	No. 9	Notre Dame Stadium; Notre Dame, IN (College GameDay)	NBC	L 14–17	77,622
September 30	7:30 p.m.	at No. 17 Duke	No. 11	Wallace Wade Stadium; Durham, NC (College GameDay)	ABC	W 21–14	40,768
October 7	7:30 p.m.	at No. 25 Louisville	No. 10	L&N Federal Credit Union Stadium; Louisville, KY	ABC	L 20–33	59,081
October 14	7:30 p.m.	No. 10 USC	No. 21	Notre Dame Stadium; Notre Dame, IN (rivalry, Big Noon Kickoff)	NBC	W 48–20	77,622
October 28	3:30 p.m.	Pittsburgh	No. 14	Notre Dame Stadium; South Bend, IN (rivalry)	NBC	W 58–7	77,622
November 4	12:00 p.m.	at Clemson	No. 15	Memorial Stadium; Clemson, SC	ABC	L 23–31	81,500
November 18	3:30 p.m.	Wake Forest	No. 19	Notre Dame Stadium; Notre Dame, IN	NBC	W 45–7	77,622
November 25	7:00 p.m.	at Stanford	No. 18	Stanford Stadium; Stanford, CA (rivalry)	P12N	W 56–23	30,901
December 29	2:00 p.m.	vs. No. 19 Oregon State	No. 16	Sun Bowl; El Paso, TX (Sun Bowl)	CBS	W 40–8	48,223
Rankings from AP Poll (and CFP Rankings, after October 31) - Released prior to game; All times are in Eastern time

== Rankings ==
Ranking movements Legend: ██ Increase in ranking ██ Decrease in ranking
	Week															
Poll	Pre	1	2	3	4	5	6	7	8	9	10	11	12	13	14	Final
AP	13	10	9	9	11	10	21	15	14	12	22	20	17	16	15	14
Coaches	13	11	11	9	13	11	21	18	14	12	22	18	17	16	16	14
CFP	Not released									15	20	19	18	17	16	Not released

== Game summaries ==
=== Vs. Navy ===
Navy Midshipmen (0–0) vs No. 13 Notre Dame Fighting Irish (0–0) – Game summary
(Aer Lingus College Football Classic)

Quarter	1	2	3	4	Total
Midshipmen	0	0	0	3	3
No. 13 Fighting Irish	14	14	7	7	42

at Aviva Stadium • Dublin, Ireland

- Date: August 26, 2023
- Game time: 2:30 p.m.
- Game weather: Cloudy, 59 °F (15 °C)
- Game attendance: 49,000
- Referee: Luke Richman
- TV announcers (NBC): Noah Eagle (play-by-play), Jason Garrett (analyst), and Zora Stephenson (sideline)

Game information

First quarter

- (8:26) ND – Audric Estimé 1-yard rush, Spencer Shrader kick (Drive: 13 plays, 81 yards, 6:28; Notre Dame 7–0)
- (1:03) ND – Jadarian Price 19-yard rush, Spencer Shrader kick (Drive: 7 plays, 63 yards, 3:27; Notre Dame 14–0)

Second quarter

- (10:00) ND – Jaden Greathouse 35-yard pass from Sam Hartman, Spencer Shrader kick (Drive: 4 plays, 78 yards, 1:52; Notre Dame 21–0)
- (0:13) ND – Jayden Thomas 14-yard pass from Sam Hartman, Spencer Shrader kick (Drive: 9 plays, 80 yards, 1:42; Notre Dame 28–0)

Third quarter

- (9:36) ND – Jaden Greathouse 20-yard pass from Sam Hartman, Spencer Shrader kick (Drive: 6 plays, 63 yards, 2:48; Notre Dame 35–0)

Fourth quarter

- (11:54) ND – Deion Colzie 25-yard pass from Sam Hartman, Spencer Shrader kick (Drive: 7 plays, 60 yards, 3:43; Notre Dame 42–0)
- (3:33) NAVY – Evan Warren 31-yard field goal (Drive: 15 plays, 62 yards, 8:21; Notre Dame 42–3)

Statistics	NAVY	ND
First downs	12	27
Total yards	169	444
Rushes/yards	48–126	32–191
Passing yards	43	253
Passing: Comp–Att–Int	3–7–0	20–25–0
Time of possession	33:14	26:46

Team	Category	Player	Statistics
Navy	Passing	Tai Lavatai	3/6, 43 yards
Navy	Rushing	Daba Fofana	15 carries, 56 yards
Navy	Receiving	Brandon Chatman	2 receptions, 41 yards
Notre Dame	Passing	Sam Hartman	19/23, 251 yards, 4 TD
Notre Dame	Rushing	Audric Estimé	16 carries, 95 yards, TD
Notre Dame	Receiving	Jaden Greathouse	3 receptions, 68 yards, 2 TD

=== Tennessee State ===
Tennessee State Tigers (0–0) vs No. 13 Notre Dame Fighting Irish (1–0) – Game summary

Quarter	1	2	3	4	Total
Tigers	3	0	0	0	3
No. 13 Fighting Irish	7	14	28	7	56

at Notre Dame Stadium • Notre Dame, IN

- Date: September 2, 2023
- Game time: 3:30 p.m.
- Game weather: Sunny, 85 °F (29 °C)
- Game attendance: 77,622
- Referee: Mike Roche
- TV announcers (NBC): Paul Burmeister (play-by-play), Jason Garrett (analyst), and Zora Stephenson (sideline)

Game information

First quarter

- (9:17) ND – Jeremiyah Love 36-yard rush, Spencer Shrader kick (Drive: 10 plays, 75 yards, 5:43; Notre Dame 7–0)
- (2:44) TNST – James Lowery 38-yard field goal (Drive: 15 plays, 55 yards, 6:33; Notre Dame 7–3)

Second quarter

- (12:22) ND – Sam Hartman 5-yard rush, Spencer Shrader kick (Drive: 8 plays, 80 yards, 4:16; Notre Dame 14–3)
- (9:41) ND – Chris Tyree 24-yard pass from Sam Hartman, Spencer Shrader kick (Drive: 4 plays, 57 yards, 2:01; Notre Dame 21–3)
- (5:17) ND – Audric Estimé 5-yard rush, Spencer Shrader kick (Drive: 8 plays, 53 yards, 2:55; Notre Dame 28–3)
- (0:15) ND – Holden Staes 4-yard pass from Sam Hartman, Spencer Shrader kick (Drive: 6 plays, 80 yards, 0:38; Notre Dame 35–3)

Third quarter

- (1:06) ND – Jadarian Price 40-yard pass from Steve Angeli, Spencer Shrader kick (Drive: 7 plays, 82 yards, 3:28; Notre Dame 42–3)
- (0:19) ND – Clarence Lewis 33-yard interception return, Spencer Shrader kick (Drive: 0:47; Notre Dame 49–3)

Fourth quarter

- (7:43) ND – Gi'Bran Payne 42-yard pass from Steve Angeli, Zac Yoakam kick (Drive: 7 plays, 87 yards, 3:34; Notre Dame 56–3)

Statistics	TNST	ND
First downs	12	26
Total yards	158	557
Rushes/yards	35–91	33–221
Passing yards	67	336
Passing: Comp–Att–Int	8–22–2	24–30–0
Time of possession	26:16	33:44

Team	Category	Player	Statistics
Tennessee State	Passing	Deveon Bryant	5/12, 43 yards, 2 INT
Tennessee State	Rushing	Deveon Bryant	6 carries, 29 yards
Tennessee State	Receiving	Dashon Davis	1 reception, 22 yards
Notre Dame	Passing	Sam Hartman	14/17, 194 yards, 2 TD
Notre Dame	Rushing	Audric Estimé	13 carries, 116 yards, TD
Notre Dame	Receiving	Jayden Thomas	4 receptions, 62 yards

=== at NC State ===
No. 10 Notre Dame Fighting Irish (2–0) at North Carolina State Wolfpack (1–0) – Game summary

Quarter	1	2	3	4	Total
No. 10 Fighting Irish	3	14	7	21	45
Wolfpack	0	7	10	7	24

at Carter–Finley Stadium • Raleigh, NC

- Date: September 9, 2023
- Game time: 12:00 p.m.
- Game weather: Cloudy • Temperature: 79 °F (26 °C) • Wind: SE 5 MPH
- Game attendance: 56,919
- Referee: Adam Savole
- TV announcers (ABC): Sean McDonough (play-by-play), Greg McElroy (analyst), and Molly McGrath (sideline)

Game information

First quarter

- (3:18) ND – Spencer Shrader 54-yard field goal (Drive: 12 plays, 50 yards, 5:51; Notre Dame 3–0)

Second quarter

- (14:32) ND – Audric Estimé 80-yard rush, Spencer Shrader kick (Drive: 1 play, 80 yards, 0:13; Notre Dame 10–0)
- (1:16) NCST – Bradley Rozner 9-yard pass from Brennan Armstrong, Brayden Narveson kick (Drive: 7 plays, 62 yards, 1:03; Notre Dame 10–7)
- (0:40) ND – Jaden Greathouse 13-yard pass from Sam Hartman, Spencer Shrader kick (Drive: 3 plays, 78 yards, 0:30; Notre Dame 17–7)

Third quarter

- (7:27) NCST – Brayden Narveson 49-yard field goal (Drive: 5 plays, 33 yards, 1:15; Notre Dame 17–10)
- (5:50) ND – Holden Staes 40-yard pass from Sam Hartman, Spencer Shrader kick (Drive: 3 plays, 76 yards, 1:30; Notre Dame 24–10)
- (2:55) NCST – Brennan Armstrong 1-yard rush, Brayden Narveson kick (Drive: 7 plays, 75 yards, 2:55; Notre Dame 24–17)

Fourth quarter

- (11:38) ND – Davis Sherwood 10-yard pass from Sam Hartman, Spencer Shrader kick (Drive: 5 plays, 33 yards, 2:43; Notre Dame 31–17)
- (10:42) ND – Audric Estimé 7-yard rush, Spencer Shrader kick (Drive: 3 plays, 16 yards, 0:36; Notre Dame 38–17)
- (4:35) ND – Holden Staes 35-yard pass from Sam Hartman, Spencer Shrader kick (Drive: 5 plays, 54 yards, 3:03; Notre Dame 45–17)
- (2:03) NCST – Dacari Collins 23-yard pass from Brennan Armstrong, Brayden Narveson kick (Drive: 9 plays, 65 yards, 2:32; Notre Dame 45–24)

Statistics	ND	NCST
First downs	16	20
Total yards	456	344
Rushes/yards	37–170	30–84
Passing yards	286	260
Passing: Comp–Att–Int	15–24–0	22–48–3
Time of possession	32:53	27:07

Team	Category	Player	Statistics
Notre Dame	Passing	Sam Hartman	15/24, 286 yards, 4 TD
Notre Dame	Rushing	Audric Estimé	14 carries, 134 yards, 2 TD
Notre Dame	Receiving	Holden Staes	4 receptions, 115 yards, 2 TD
North Carolina State	Passing	Brennan Armstrong	22/47, 260 yards, 2 TD, 3 INT
North Carolina State	Rushing	Brennan Armstrong	12 carries, 26 yards, TD
North Carolina State	Receiving	Juice Vereen	4 receptions, 65 yards

=== Central Michigan ===
Central Michigan Chippewas (1–1) vs No. 9 Notre Dame Fighting Irish (3–0) – Game summary

Quarter	1	2	3	4	Total
Chippewas	7	7	3	0	17
No. 9 Fighting Irish	14	7	10	10	41

at Notre Dame Stadium • Notre Dame, IN

- Date: September 16, 2023
- Game time: 2:30 p.m.
- Game weather: Sunny, 71 °F (22 °C)
- Game attendance: 77,622
- Referee: Jerry Magallanes
- TV announcers (Peacock): Jac Collinsworth (play-by-play), Jason Garrett (analyst), and Zora Stephenson (sideline)

Game information

First quarter

- (10:52) ND – Tobias Merriweather 75-yard pass from Sam Hartman, Spencer Shrader kick (Drive: 4 plays, 91 yards, 2:03; Notre Dame 7–0)
- (7:22) CMU – Myles Bailey 6-yard rush, Tristan Mattson kick (Drive: 6 plays, 65 yards, 3:30; Tied 7–7)
- (2:13) ND – Audric Estimé 17-yard rush, Spencer Shrader kick (Drive: 11 plays, 75 yards, 5:09; Notre Dame 14–7)

Second quarter

- (14:17) ND – Chris Tyree 76-yard pass from Sam Hartman, Spencer Shrader kick (Drive: 3 plays, 87 yards, 1:18; Notre Dame 21–7)
- (0:17) CMU – Jase Bauer 1-yard rush, Tristan Mattson kick (Drive: 9 plays, 83 yards, 3:58; Notre Dame 21–14)

Third quarter

- (11:36) ND – Sam Hartman 1-yard rush, Spencer Shrader kick (Drive: 7 plays, 74 yards, 3:19; Notre Dame 28–14)
- (1:59) CMU – Tristan Mattson 23-yard field goal (Drive: 12 plays, 50 yards, 5:37; Notre Dame 28–17)
- (0:30) ND – Spencer Shrader 50-yard field goal (Drive: 5 plays, 43 yards, 1:29; Notre Dame 31–17)

Fourth quarter

- (10:07) ND – Spencer Shrader 31-yard field goal (Drive: 10 plays, 47 yards, 3:54; Notre Dame 34–17)
- (5:45) ND – Holden Staes 4-yard pass from Sam Hartman, Spencer Shrader kick (Drive: 6 plays, 82 yards, 2:51; Notre Dame 41–17)

Statistics	CMU	ND
First downs	14	23
Total yards	268	578
Rushes/yards	34–131	37–263
Passing yards	137	342
Passing: Comp–Att–Int	10–20–0	17–28–0
Time of possession	29:27	30:33

Team	Category	Player	Statistics
Central Michigan	Passing	Jase Bauer	10/20, 137 yards
Central Michigan	Rushing	Myles Bailey	12 carries, 59 yards, TD
Central Michigan	Receiving	Jesse Prewitt III	2 receptions, 59 yards
Notre Dame	Passing	Sam Hartman	16/26, 330 yards, 3 TD
Notre Dame	Rushing	Audric Estimé	20 carries, 176 yards, TD
Notre Dame	Receiving	Tobias Merriweather	3 receptions, 91 yards, TD

=== No. 6 Ohio State ===
No. 6 Ohio State Buckeyes (3–0) vs No. 9 Notre Dame Fighting Irish (4–0) – Game summary

Quarter	1	2	3	4	Total
No. 6 Buckeyes	0	3	7	7	17
No. 9 Fighting Irish	0	0	7	7	14

at Notre Dame Stadium • Notre Dame, IN

- Date: September 23, 2023
- Game time: 7:30 p.m.
- Game weather: Sunny, 72 °F (22 °C)
- Game attendance: 77,622
- Referee: Larry Smith
- TV announcers (NBC): Noah Eagle (play-by-play), Todd Blackledge (analyst), Kathryn Tappen (sideline), and Ahmed Fareed (sideline)

Game information

First quarter

None

Second quarter

- (0:26) OSU - Jayden Fielding 31-yard field goal (Drive: 12 plays, 66 yards, 3:20; Ohio State 3–0)

Third quarter

- (11:14) OSU - TreVeyon Henderson 61-yard run, Jayden Fielding kick (Drive: 1 play, 61 yards, 0:11; Ohio State 10–0)
- (3:35) ND - Gi'Bran Payne 1-yard run, Spencer Shrader kick (Drive: 13 plays, 75 yards, 7:39; Ohio State 10–7)

Fourth quarter

- (8:22) ND - Rico Flores Jr. 2-yard pass from Sam Hartman, Spencer Shrader kick (Drive: 11 plays, 96 yards, 6:28; Notre Dame 14–10)
- (0:01) OSU - Chip Trayanum 1-yard run, Jayden Fielding kick (Drive: 15 plays, 65 yards, 1:26; Ohio State 17–14)

Statistics	OSU	ND
First downs	19	22
Total yards	366	351
Rushes/yards	27–126	39–176
Passing yards	240	175
Passing: Comp–Att–Int	21–38–0	17–25–0
Time of possession	25:01	34:59

Team	Category	Player	Statistics
Ohio State	Passing	Kyle McCord	21/37, 240 yards
Ohio State	Rushing	TreVeyon Henderson	14 carries, 104 yards, TD
Ohio State	Receiving	Emeka Egbuka	7 receptions, 96 yards
Notre Dame	Passing	Sam Hartman	17/25, 175 yards, TD
Notre Dame	Rushing	Audric Estimé	14 carries, 70 yards
Notre Dame	Receiving	Mitchell Evans	6 receptions, 70 yards

=== At No. 17 Duke ===
No. 11 Notre Dame Fighting Irish (4–1) at No. 17 Duke Blue Devils (4–0) – Game summary

Quarter	1	2	3	4	Total
No. 11 Fighting Irish	7	3	3	8	21
No. 17 Blue Devils	0	0	7	7	14

at Wallace Wade Stadium • Durham, NC

- Date: September 30, 2023
- Game time: 7:30 p.m.
- Game weather: Sunny, 71 °F (22 °C)
- Game attendance: 40,768
- Referee: Riley Johnson
- TV announcers (ABC): Rece Davis (play-by-play), Kirk Herbstreit (analyst), and Holly Rowe (sideline)

Game information

First quarter

- (11:00) ND – Audric Estimé 6-yard run, Spencer Shrader kick (Drive: 8 plays, 82 yards, 3:57; Notre Dame 7–0)

Second quarter

- (14:56) ND – Spencer Shrader 35-yard field goal (Drive: 4 plays, 4 yards, 1:33; Notre Dame 10–0)

Third quarter

- (9:17) ND – Spencer Shrader 45-yard field goal (Drive: 10 plays, 43 yards, 4:45; Notre Dame 13–0)
- (3:36) DUKE – Jordan Waters 1-yard run, Todd Pelino kick (Drive: 11 plays, 75 yards, 5:41; Notre Dame 13–7)

Fourth quarter

- (9:17) DUKE – Jaquez Moore 3-yard pass from Riley Leonard, Todd Pelino kick (Drive: 8 plays, 80 yards, 4:27; Duke 14–13)
- (0:31) ND – Audric Estimé 30-yard run, Sam Hartman two-point pass to Rico Flores Jr. (Drive: 10 plays, 95 yards, 2:04; Notre Dame 21–14)

Statistics	ND	DUKE
First downs	16	17
Total yards	381	323
Rushes/yards	32–159	40–189
Passing yards	222	134
Passing: Comp–Att–Int	15–31–0	12–27–1
Time of possession	28:15	31:45

Team	Category	Player	Statistics
Notre Dame	Passing	Sam Hartman	15/30, 222 yards
Notre Dame	Rushing	Audric Estimé	18 carries, 81 yards, 2 TD
Notre Dame	Receiving	Mitchell Evans	6 receptions, 134 yards
Duke	Passing	Riley Leonard	12/27, 134 yards, TD, INT
Duke	Rushing	Riley Leonard	18 carries, 88 yards
Duke	Receiving	Jordan Moore	4 receptions, 67 yards, TD

=== At No. 25 Louisville ===
No. 10 Notre Dame Fighting Irish (5–1) at No. 25 Louisville Cardinals (5–0) – Game summary

Quarter	1	2	3	4	Total
No. 10 Fighting Irish	0	7	6	7	20
No. 25 Cardinals	7	0	10	16	33

at L&N Federal Credit Union Stadium • Louisville, KY

- Date: October 7, 2023
- Game time: 7:30 p.m.
- Game weather: Sunny, 57 °F (14 °C)
- Game attendance: 59,801
- Referee: Gary Patterson
- TV announcers (ABC): Joe Tessitore (play-by-play), Jordan Rodgers (analyst), and Katie George (sideline)

Game information

First quarter

- (6:05) LOU – Jamari Thrash 9-yard pass from Jack Plummer, Brock Travelstead kick (Drive: 12 plays, 70 yards, 7:06; Louisville 7–0)

Second quarter

- (6:58) ND – Jordan Falson 36-yard pass from Sam Hartman, Spencer Shrader kick (Drive: 11 plays, 88 yards, 5:45; Tied 7–7)

Third quarter

- (13:18) ND – Spencer Shrader 53-yard field goal (Drive: 4 plays, 4 yards, 1:35; Notre Dame 10–7)
- (8:24) LOU – Brock Travelstead 44-yard field goal (Drive: 9 plays, 48 yards, 4:54; Tied 10–10)
- (5:45) LOU – Jahwar Jordan 45-yard run, Brock Travelstead kick (Drive: 2 plays, 64 yards, 0:43; Louisville 17–10)
- (1:06) ND – Spencer Shrader 54-yard field goal (Drive: 7 plays, 27 yards, 4:39; Louisville 17–13)

Fourth quarter

- (11:12) LOU – Jahwar Jordan 21-yard run, Brock Travelstead kick (Drive: 11 plays, 75 yards, 4:54; Louisville 24–13)
- (7:31) LOU – Brock Travelstead 45-yard field goal (Drive: 4 plays, 7 yards, 2:11; Louisville 27–13)
- (5:02) LOU – Brock Travelstead 32-yard field goal (Drive: 4 plays, -4 yards, 2:18; Louisville 30–13)
- (3:12) LOU – Brock Travelstead 35-yard field goal (Drive: 4 plays, 8 yards, 0:22; Louisville 33–13)
- (1:35) ND – Mitchell Evans 6-yard pass from Sam Hartman, Spencer Shrader kick (Drive: 7 plays, 75 yards, 1:37; Louisville 33–20)

Statistics	ND	LOU
First downs	17	17
Total yards	298	330
Rushes/yards	28–44	40–185
Passing yards	254	145
Passing: Comp–Att–Int	22–38–3	17–24–0
Time of possession	28:36	31:24

Team	Category	Player	Statistics
Notre Dame	Passing	Sam Hartman	22/38, 254 yards, 2 TD, 3 INT
Notre Dame	Rushing	Jeremiyah Love	5 carries, 37 yards
Notre Dame	Receiving	Mitchell Evans	4 receptions, 71 yards, TD
Louisville	Passing	Jack Plummer	17/24, 145 yards, TD
Louisville	Rushing	Jawhar Jordan	21 carries, 143 yards, 2 TD
Louisville	Receiving	Jamari Thrash	8 receptions, 75 yards, TD

=== No. 10 USC ===
No. 10 USC Trojans (6–0) vs No. 21 Notre Dame Fighting Irish (5–2) – Game summary

Quarter	1	2	3	4	Total
No. 10 USC	3	3	7	7	20
No. 21 Notre Dame	7	17	7	17	48

at Notre Dame Stadium • Notre Dame, IN

- Date: October 14, 2023
- Game time: 7:30 p.m.
- Game weather: Cloudy 52 °F (11 °C)
- Game attendance: 77,622
- Referee: Mark Duddy
- TV announcers (NBC): Jac Collinsworth (play-by-play), Jason Garrett (analyst), Zora Stephenson (sideline), and Ahmed Fareed (sidelines)

Game information

First quarter

- (11:30) ND – Gi'Bran Payne 4-yard pass from Sam Hartman, Spencer Shrader kick (Drive: 3 plays, 12 yards, 1:23; Notre Dame 7–0)
- (1:13) USC – Denis Lynch 25-yard field goal (Drive: 10 plays, 59 yards, 5:25; Notre Dame 7–3)

Second quarter

- (2:19) ND – Spencer Shrader 26-yard field goal (Drive: 8 plays, 46 yards, 3:48; Notre Dame 10–3)
- (4:14) ND – Audric Estimé 2-yard run, Spencer Shrader kick (Drive: 1 play, 2 yards, 0:03; Notre Dame 17–3)
- (1:30) ND – Audric Estimé 1-yard run, Spencer Shrader kick (Drive: 5 plays, 50 yards, 2:05; Notre Dame 24–3)
- (0:00) USC – Denis Lynch 48-yard field goal (Drive: 8 plays, 44 yards, 1:30; Notre Dame 24–6)

Third quarter

- (7:20) USC – MarShawn Lloyd 31-yard run, Denis Lynch kick (Drive: 6 plays, 57 yards, 3:33; Notre Dame 24–13)
- (3:54) ND – Chris Tyree 46-yard pass from Sam Hartman, Spencer Shrader kick (Drive: 6 plays, 68 yards, 3:20; Notre Dame 31–13)

Fourth quarter

- (9:04) USC – Brenden Rice 7-yard pass from Caleb Williams, Denis Lynch kick (Drive: 5 plays, 18 yards, 3:09; Notre Dame 31–20)
- (8:50) ND – Jadarian Price 99-yard kickoff return, Spencer Shrader kick (Drive: 7 plays, 4 yards, 3:57; Notre Dame 38–20)
- (3:40) ND – Spencer Shrader 23-yard field goal (Drive: 4 plays, 9 yards, 1:09; Notre Dame 41–20)
- (3:27) ND – Xavier Watts 0-yard fumble return, Spencer Shrader kick (Drive: 1 play, -2 yards, 0:09; Notre Dame 48–20)

Statistics	USC	ND
First downs	23	13
Total yards	302	251
Rushes/yards	103	125
Passing yards	199	125
Passing: Comp–Att–Int	23–37–3	13–20–0
Time of possession	34:35	25:25

Team	Category	Player	Statistics
USC	Passing	Caleb Williams	23/37, 199 yards, TD, 3 INT
USC	Rushing	MarShawn Lloyd	8 carries, 46 yards, TD
USC	Receiving	Michael Jackson III	6 receptions, 51 yards
Notre Dame	Passing	Sam Hartman	13/20, 126 yards, 2 TD
Notre Dame	Rushing	Audric Estimé	22 carries, 95 yards, 2 TD
Notre Dame	Receiving	Chris Tyree	3 receptions, 62 yards, TD

=== Pittsburgh ===
Pittsburgh Panthers (2–5) vs No. 14 Notre Dame Fighting Irish (6–2) – Game summary

Quarter	1	2	3	4	Total
Pittsburgh	0	0	0	7	7
No. 14 Notre Dame	7	10	27	14	58

at Notre Dame Stadium • Notre Dame, IN

- Date: October 28, 2023
- Game time: 3:30 p.m.
- Game attendance: 77,622
- TV announcers (NBC): Jac Collinsworth (play-by-play), Jason Garrett (analyst), and Zora Stephenson (reporter)

Game information

First quarter

- (7:18) ND – Chris Tyree 82-yard punt return, Spencer Shrader kick (Drive: 3 plays, 7 yards, 2:19; Notre Dame 7–0)

Second quarter

- (10:17) ND – Audric Estimé 15-yard run, Spencer Shrader kick (Drive: 4 plays, 63 yards, 1:35; Notre Dame 14–0)
- (0:00) ND – Spencer Shrader 23-yard field goal (Drive: 4 play, 25 yards, 1:31; Notre Dame 17–0)

Third quarter

- (11:07) ND – Jadarian Price 10-yard run, Spencer Shrader kick (Drive: 3 plays, 80 yards, 1:33; Notre Dame 24–0)
- (10:12) ND – Jaden Mickey 43-yard interception return, Spencer Shrader kick (Drive: 3 plays, 6 yards, 0:55; Notre Dame 31–0)
- (8:21) ND – Ramon Henderson 0-yard fumble return, Spencer Shrader kick missed (Drive: 3 plays, 3 yards, 0:59; Notre Dame 37–0)
- (2:21) ND – Audric Estimé 3-yard run, Spencer Shrader kick (Drive: 7 plays, 45 yards, 4:07; Notre Dame 44–0)

Fourth quarter

- (9:47) ND – Audric Estimé 5-yard Run, Spencer Shrader kick (Drive: 8 plays, 84 yards, 5:06; Notre Dame 51–0)
- (8:18) Pitt – Konata Mumpfield 25-yard pass from Nate Yarnell, Ben Sauls kick (Drive: 3 plays, 75 yards, 1:29; Notre Dame 51–7)
- (3:41) ND – Cooper Flanagan 19-yard pass from Steve Angeli, Spencer Shrader kick (Drive: 8 plays, 63 yards, 4:30; Notre Dame 58–7)

Statistics	PITT	ND
First downs	25	11
Total yards	255	535
Rushes/yards	53	155
Passing yards	202	380
Passing: Comp–Att–Int	16–32–4	24–32–2
Time of possession	24:29	35:31

Team	Category	Player	Statistics
Pittsburgh	Passing	Christian Veilleux	14/29, 127 yards, 4 INT
Pittsburgh	Rushing	Rodney Hammond	6 carries, 31 yards
Pittsburgh	Receiving	Bub Means	3 receptions, 63 yards
Notre Dame	Passing	Sam Hartman	18/25, 288 yards, 2 INT
Notre Dame	Rushing	Audric Estimé	19 carries, 114 yards, 3 TD
Notre Dame	Receiving	Rico Flores Jr.	2 receptions, 72 yards

=== At Clemson ===
No. 15 Notre Dame Fighting Irish (7–2) at Clemson Tigers (4–4) – Game summary

Quarter	1	2	3	4	Total
No. 15 Notre Dame	3	6	14	0	23
Clemson	10	14	7	0	31

at Memorial Stadium • Clemson, SC

- Date: November 4, 2023
- Game time: 12:00 p.m. EST
- Game weather: Temperature: 58 °F (14 °C) • Wind: NE @ 1 mph (1.6 km/h) • Weather: Clear
- Game attendance: 81,500
- Referee: Adam Savoie
- TV announcers (ABC): Sean McDonough (play-by-play), Greg McElroy (analyst), and Molly McGrath (sideline)

Game information
First quarter
- (10:36) Notre Dame – Spencer Shrader 43-yard field goal, (Drive: 7 plays, 50 yards, 4:24; Notre Dame 3–0)
- (6:57) Clemson – Phil Mafah 41-yard rush, Johnathan Weitz kick, (Drive: 1 play, 41 yards, 0:07; Clemson 7–3)
- (2:08) Clemson – Johnathan Weitz 21-yard field goal, (Drive: 7 plays, 18 yards, 2:26; Clemson 10–3)

Second quarter

- (13:34) Notre Dame – Spencer Shrader 30-yard field goal, (Drive: 8 plays, 63 yards, 3:34; Clemson 10–6)
- (9:11) Clemson – Tyler Brown 9-yard pass from Cade Klubnik, Weitz kick, (Drive: 9 plays, 75 yards, 4:23; Clemson 17–6)
- (8:33) Clemson – Jeremiah Trotter Jr. 28-yard interception return, Weitz kick, (Drive: 1 play, 28 yards, 0:38; Clemson 24–6)
- (1:32) Notre Dame – Spencer Shrader 23-yard field goal, (Drive: 12 plays, 60 yards, 7:01; Clemson 24–9)

Third quarter

- (13:57) Notre Dame – Audric Estimé 2-yard rush, Spencer Shrader kick, (Drive: 1 play, 2 yards, 0:04; Clemson 24–16)
- (8:08) Clemson – Phil Mafah 1-yard rush, Johnathan Weitz kick, (Drive: 11 plays, 75 yards, 5:49; Clemson 31–16)
- (6:05) Notre Dame – Sam Hartman 26-yard rush, Spencer Shrader kick, (Drive: 4 plays, 74 yards, 1:56; Clemson 31–23)

Fourth quarter None

Statistics	ND	CLEM
First downs	13	19
Total yards	329	285
Rushes/yards	31–183	43–176
Passing yards	146	109
Passing: Comp–Att–Int	13–30–2	13–26–1
Time of possession	28:12	31:48

Team	Category	Player	Statistics
Notre Dame	Passing	Sam Hartman	13/30, 146 yards, 2 INT
Notre Dame	Rushing	Audric Estimé	17 carries, 87 yards, 1 TD
Notre Dame	Receiving	Rico Flores Jr.	1 reception, 35 yards
Clemson	Passing	Cade Klubnik	13/26, 109 yards, 1 TD, 1 INT
Clemson	Rushing	Phil Mafah	36 carries, 186 yards, 2 TDs
Clemson	Receiving	Beaux Collins	3 receptions, 37 yards

=== Wake Forest ===
Wake Forest Demon Deacons (4–6) vs. No. 19 Notre Dame Fighting Irish (7–3) – Game summary

Quarter	1	2	3	4	Total
Wake Forest	0	7	0	0	7
No. 19 Notre Dame	7	10	14	14	45

at Notre Dame Stadium • Notre Dame, IN

- Date: November 18, 2023
- Game time: 3:30 p.m.
- Game weather: Sunny, 50 °F (10 °C)
- Game attendance: 77,622
- Referee: Tim Hedgepeth
- TV announcers (NBC): Jac Collinsworth (play-by-play), Jason Garrett (analyst), and Zora Stephenson (reporter)

Game information

First quarter

- (0:54) ND – Devyn Ford 12-yard pass from Sam Hartman, Spencer Shrader kick (Drive: 9 plays, 71 yards, 4:41; Notre Dame 7–0)

Second quarter

- (11:41) WF – Tate Carney 9-yard run, Matthew Dennis kick (Drive: 7 plays, 72 yards, 4:07; Tied 7–7)
- (7:06) ND – Tobias Merriweather 35-yard pass from Sam Hartman, Spencer Shrader kick (Drive: 8 plays, 66 yards, 4:28; Notre Dame 14–7)
- (0:05) ND – Spencer Shrader 37-yard field goal (Drive: 10 plays, 51 yards, 1:30; Notre Dame 17–7)

Third quarter

- (14:09) ND – Eli Raridon 19-yard pass from Sam Hartman, Spencer Shrader kick (Drive: 1 play, 19 yards, 0:07; Notre Dame 24–0)
- (5:22) ND – Audric Estimé 2-yard run, Spencer Shrader kick (Drive: 5 plays, 54 yards, 2:07; Notre Dame 31-7)

Fourth quarter

- (13:24) ND – Jaden Greathouse 48-yard pass from Sam Hartman, Spencer Shrader kick (Drive: 1 play, 54 yards, 2:07; Notre Dame 38–0)
- (3:56) ND – Jordan Faison 17-yard pass from Steve Angeli, Marcello Diomede kick (Drive: 10 plays, 73 yards, 5:49; Notre Dame 45–7)

Statistics	WAKE	ND
First downs	14	25
Total yards	232	450
Rushes/yards	36–134	30–137
Passing yards	98	313
Passing: Comp–Att–Int	12–21–0	24–34–0
Time of possession	31:27	28:33

Team	Category	Player	Statistics
Wake Forest	Passing	Michael Kern	11/20, 81 yards
Wake Forest	Rushing	Ellison Justice	15 carries, 63 yards
Wake Forest	Receiving	Jahmal Banks	5 receptions, 35 yards
Notre Dame	Passing	Sam Hartman	21/29, 277 yards, 4 TD
Notre Dame	Rushing	Audric Estimé	22 carries, 115 yards, TD
Notre Dame	Receiving	Rico Flores Jr.	8 receptions, 102 yards

=== At Stanford ===
No. 18 Notre Dame Fighting Irish (8–3) at Stanford Cardinal (3–8) – Game summary

Quarter	1	2	3	4	Total
No. 18 Notre Dame	7	21	21	7	56
Stanford	13	3	0	7	23

at Stanford Stadium • Stanford, CA

- Date: November 25, 2023
- Game time: 7:00 p.m.
- Game weather: Sunny, 75 °F (24 °C)
- Game attendance: 30,901
- Referee: Michael Roche
- TV announcers (P12N): Ted Robinson (play-by-play) and Yogi Roth (analyst)

Game information

First quarter

- (10:59) STAN – Joshua Karty 34-yard field goal (Drive: 7 plays, 59 yards, 4:01; Stanford 3–0)
- (5:37) ND – Audric Estimé 39-yard run, Spencer Shrader kick (Drive: 4 plays, 78 yards, 1:45; Notre Dame 7–3)
- (2:23) STAN – Joshua Karty 23-yard field goal (Drive: 8 plays, 70 yards, 3:14; Notre Dame 7–6)
- (1:31) STAN – Tiger Bachmeier 14-yard run, Joshua Karty kick (Drive: 2 plays, 30 yards 0:37; Stanford 13–7)

Second quarter

- (11:56) ND – Jaden Greathouse 15-yard pass from Sam Hartman, Spencer Shrader kick (Drive: 10 plays, 75 yards, 4:35; Notre Dame 14–13)
- (8:57) STAN – Joshua Karty 56-yard field goal (Drive: 4 plays, 0 yards, 0:25; Stanford 16–14)
- (3:53) ND – Audric Estimé 6-yard run, Spencer Shrader kick (Drive: 10 plays, 75 yards, 5:04; Notre Dame 21–16)
- (0:19) ND – Gi'Bran Payne 3-yard run, Spencer Shrader kick (Drive: 9 plays, 56 yards, 1:06; Notre Dame 28–16)

Third quarter

- (10:25) ND – Audric Estimé 5-yard run, Spencer Shrader kick (Drive: 10 plays, 75 yards, 4:35; Notre Dame 35–16)
- (6:08) ND – Jordan Faison 45-yard pass from Sam Hartman, Spencer Shrader kick (Drive: 1 play, 45 yards, 0:09; Notre Dame 42–16)
- (1:12) ND – Audric Estimé 25-yard run, Spencer Shrader kick (Drive: 5 plays, 45 yards, 2:29; Notre Dame 49–16)

Fourth quarter

- (12:41) ND – Javontae Jean-Baptiste 60-yard return of blocked field goal, Spencer Shrader kick (Drive: 5 plays, 37 yards, 2:29; Notre Dame 56–16)
- (7:16) STAN – Justin Lamson 4-yard run, Emmett Kenney kick (Drive: 9 plays, 47 yards, 4:58; Notre Dame 56–23)

Statistics	ND	STAN
First downs	28	19
Total yards	521	359
Rushes/yards	48–381	31–143
Passing yards	140	216
Passing: Comp–Att–Int	8–15–2	21–42–1
Time of possession	27:13	32:47

Team	Category	Player	Statistics
Notre Dame	Passing	Sam Hartman	8/14, 140 yards, 2 TD, INT
Notre Dame	Rushing	Audric Estimé	25 carries, 238 yards, 4 TD
Notre Dame	Receiving	Jordan Faison	3 receptions, 66 yards, TD
Stanford	Passing	Ashton Daniels	15/25, 152 yards, INT
Stanford	Rushing	Justin Lamson	10 carries, 82 yards, TD
Stanford	Receiving	E. J. Smith	7 receptions, 116 yards

=== Vs No. 19 Oregon State—Sun Bowl ===
2023 Tony the Tiger Sun Bowl
No. 19 Oregon State Beavers (8–4, 5–4) vs No. 16 Notre Dame Fighting Irish (9–3) – Game summary

Quarter	1	2	3	4	Total
No. 19 Beavers	0	0	0	8	8
No. 16 Fighting Irish	7	7	10	16	40

at Sun Bowl • El Paso, Texas

- Date: Friday, December 29th, 2023
- Game time: 2:00 pm EST/12:00 pm MST/11:00 am PST
- Game weather: Sunny, 50 °F (10 °C)
- Game attendance: 48,223
- Referee: Scott Walker
- TV announcers (CBS): Brad Nessler (play-by-play), Gary Danielson (analyst), and Jenny Dell (sideline)

Game information

First Quarter

- (6:47) ND – Jayden Thomas 8 yard pass from Steve Angeli, Spencer Shrader kick (Drive: 11 plays, 96 yards, 6:09; Notre Dame 7–0)

Second Quarter

- (0:27) ND – Jadarian Price 1 yard run, Spencer Shrader kick (Drive: 7 plays, 44 yards, 3:02; Notre Dame 14–0)

Third Quarter

- (9:43) ND – Spencer Shrader 44 yard field goal (Drive: 8 plays, 49 yards, 5:17; Notre Dame 17–0)
- (3:28) ND – Jordan Faison 13 yard pass from Steve Angeli, Spencer Shrader kick (Drive: 8 plays, 60 yards, 4:53; Notre Dame 24–0)

Fourth Quarter

- (10:55) ND – Team Safety (Drive: 1 plays, -1 yards, 0:29; Notre Dame 26–0)
- (9:08) ND – Jeremiyah Love 13 yard pass from Steve Angeli, Spencer Shrader kick (Drive: 3 plays, 72 yards, 1:47; Notre Dame 33–0)
- (6:02) OSU – Jimmy Valsin III 33 yard pass from Ben Gulbranson, Tyler Voltin run (Drive: 6 plays, 71 yards, 3:06; Notre Dame 33–8)
- (2:45) ND – Chase Ketterer 6 yard run, Spencer Shrader kick (Drive: 6 plays, 40 yards, 3:17; Notre Dame 40–8)

Statistics	No. 19 Oregon State	No. 16 Notre Dame
First downs	10	24
Total yards	44–197	67–468
Rushes/yards	16–2	48–236
Passing yards	195	232
Passing: Comp–Att–Int	17–28–1	15–19–0
Time of possession	20:06	39:54

Team	Category	Player	Statistics
No. 19 Oregon State	Passing	Ben Gulbranson	16/27, 180 yards, TD, INT
No. 19 Oregon State	Rushing	Deshaun Fenwick	6 carries, 15 yards
No. 19 Oregon State	Receiving	Jesiah Irish	3 receptions, 56 yards
No. 16 Notre Dame	Passing	Steve Angeli	15/19, 232 yards, 3 TD
No. 16 Notre Dame	Rushing	Jadarian Price	13 carries, 106 yards, TD
No. 16 Notre Dame	Receiving	Jordan Faison	5 receptions, 115 yards, TD

== Personnel ==
=== Roster ===
2023 Notre Dame Fighting Irish football team roster
Players
Coaches
Offense

Pos.	#	Name	Class
WR	0	Deion Colzie (injured)	Jr
RB	3	Gi'Bran Payne	RFr
WR	4	Chris Tyree	Sr
WR	5	Tobias Merriweather	So
RB	7	Audric Estimé	Jr
QB	8	Kenny Minchey	Fr
TE	9	Eli Raridon	So
QB	10	Sam Hartman (C)	RSr
WR	11	KK Smith	Fr
RB	12	Jeremiyah Love	Fr
TE	13	Holden Staes	So
WR	14	Braylon James	Fr
QB	16	Dylan Devezin (W)	So
WR	17	Rico Flores Jr.	Fr
QB	18	Steve Angeli	RFr
WR	19	Jaden Greathouse	Fr
RB	22	Devyn Ford	RSr
TE	23	Justin Fisher (W)	So
RB	24	Jadarian Price	RFr
WR	26	Chase Dixon (W)	Sr
RB	27	Chase Ketterer (W)	Sr
WR	28	Griffin Eifert (W)	Sr
WR	29	Matt Salerno (injured)	RSr
RB	30	Skip Velotta (W)	RSr
RB	33	Sam Assaf (W)	RSr
TE	35	Hakim Sanfo (W)	Sr
WR	37	Henry Cook (W)	Sr
TE	38	Davis Sherwood	Jr
TE	39	Andrew Yanoshak (W)	Jr
TE	42	Henry Garrity (W)	Fr
OL	50	Rocco Spindler (injured)	RSo
OL	52	Zeke Correll	RSr
OL	53	Quinn Murphy (W)	RSr
OL	54	Blake Fisher	RSo
OL	55	Chris Terek	Fr
OL	56	Charles Jagusah	Fr
OL	59	Aamil Wagner	RFr
OL	64	Joe Otting	Fr
OL	68	Michael Carmody (injured)	RJr
OL	70	Ashton Craig	RFr
OL	71	Brennan Wicks (W)	Sr
OL	72	Sam Pendleton	Fr
OL	73	Andrew Kristofic	RSr
OL	74	Billy Schrauth	RFr
OL	75	Sullivan Absher	Fr
OL	76	Joe Alt (C)	Jr
OL	77	Ty Chan	RFr
OL	78	Pat Coogan	RSo
OL	79	Tosh Baker	RJr
WR	80	Jordan Faison	Fr
WR	81	Jack Polian (W)	Jr
WR	82	Leo Scheidler (W)	So
WR	83	Jayden Thomas	RSo
TE	84	Kevin Bauman (injured)	RJr
WR	86	Alex Whitman (W)	Fr
TE	87	Cooper Flanagan	Fr
TE	88	Mitchell Evans (injured)	Jr
TE	89	Charlie Selna (W)	Sr

Defense

Pos.	#	Name	Class
S	0	Xavier Watts	RJr
DL	1	Javontae Jean-Baptiste	RSr
S	2	DJ Brown	RSr
LB	3	Jaylen Sneed	RFr
S	4	Antonio Carter II	RSr
CB	5	Cam Hart (C)	RSr
CB	6	Clarence Lewis	Sr
CB	7	Jaden Mickey	So
LB	8	Marist Liufau	RSr
S	11	Ramon Henderson	Sr
DL	12	Jordan Botelho	Sr
S	13	Thomas Harper	RSr
CB	15	Ryan Barnes	RSo
CB	16	Micah Bell	Fr
DL	17	Brenan Vernon	Fr
CB	18	Chance Tucker	RSo
S	19	Marty Auer (W)	Jr
CB	20	Benjamin Morrison	So
S	21	Adon Shuler	Fr
S	22	Ben Minich	Fr
LB	23	Jaiden Ausberry	Fr
LB	24	Jack Kiser	RSr
LB	25	Preston Zinter	Fr
CB	26	Isaiah Dunn (W)	So
LB	27	JD Bertrand (C)	RSr
S	28	Luke Talich (W)	Fr
CB	29	Christian Gray	Fr
DL	31	NaNa Osafo-Mensah	RSr
LB	33	Tre Reader (W)	So
LB	34	Drayk Bowen	Fr
S	36	Eddie Scheidler (W)	RSr
DL	40	Joshua Burnham	RFr
DL	41	Donovan Hinish	RFr
LB	42	Nolan Ziegler	RFr
DL	44	Junior Tuihalamaka	So
DL	45	Kobi Onyiuke (W)	So
LB	46	Jerry Rullo (W)	So
DL	47	Jason Onye	RSo
DL	51	Boubacar Traore	Fr
DL	56	Howard Cross III	RSr
DL	58	Grant Ristoff (W)	RSr
DL	91	Aiden Gobaira (injured)	RFr
DL	92	Aidan Keanaaina (injured)	RJr
DL	93	Armel Mukam	Fr
DL	95	Tyson Ford	RFr
DL	96	Cole Aubrey (W)	RSr
DL	97	Gabriel Rubio	RSo
DL	98	Devan Houstan	Fr
DL	99	Rylie Mills	Sr

Special teams

Pos.	#	Name	Class
P	14	Bryce McFerson	RFr
P	31	Bryan Dowd (W)	Sr
P	32	Chris Salerno (W)	Jr
K	32	Spencer Shrader	RSr
P	43	Ben Krimm (W)	RSr
K	48	Marcello Diomede (W)	Fr
LS	51	Rino Monteforte (W)	So
LS	57	Andrew Kros (W)	Fr
LS	65	Michael Vinson	RSr
K	92	Zac Yoakam (W)	So

Head coach

- Marcus Freeman

Coordinators/assistant coaches

- Gerad Parker – Offensive coordinator/tight ends
- Al Golden – Defensive coordinator/linebackers
- Marty Biagi – Special teams coordinator
- Gino Guidugli – Quarterbacks/pass game coordinator
- Deland McCullough – Running backs/run game coordinator
- Chansi Stuckey – Wide receivers
- Joe Rudolph – Offensive line
- Al Washington – Defensive line/defensive run game coordinator
- Mike Mickens – Cornerbacks/defensive pass game coordinator
- Chris O'Leary – Safeties
- Ron Powlus – Senior associate athletics director
- Olivia Mitchell – Director of football operations

Legend

- (C) Team captain
- (S) Suspended
- (I) Ineligible
- (W) Walk-on
- Injured
- Redshirt

Roster
Last update: December 29, 2023

=== Depth chart ===
Defense

FS
DJ Brown
Antonio Carter II
Thomas Harper

ROVER	MLB	WLB
Marist Liufau	JD Bertrand	Jack Kiser
Jaiden Ausberry	Drayk Bowen	Jaylen Sneed
–	–	–

SS
Xavier Watts
Ramon Henderson
–

CB
Cam Hart
Jaden Mickey
–

DE	DT	DT	DE
Javontae Jean-Baptiste	Howard Cross III	Rylie Mills	Jordan Botelho
NaNa Osafo-Mensah	Gabriel Rubio	Jason Onye	Junior Tuihalamaka
Joshua Burnham	–	Donovan Hinish	Joshua Burnham

CB
Benjamin Morrison
Christian Gray
Clarence Lewis

Offense

WR-X
Rico Flores Jr.
Tobias Merriweather
–

WR-SL
Chris Tyree
Jordan Faison
–

LT	LG	C	RG	RT
Joe Alt	Pat Coogan	Zeke Correll	Billy Schrauth	Blake Fisher
Tosh Baker	Ashton Craig	Ashton Craig	Andrew Kristofic	Aamil Wagner
–	–	–	–	–

TE
Holden Staes
Eli Raridon
Cooper Flanagan

WR-Z
Jayden Thomas
Jaden Greathouse
–

QB
Sam Hartman
Steve Angeli
–

Key reserves
TE Davis Sherwood
OL Ty Chan
DL Tyson Ford
LB Nolan Ziegler
CB Ryan Barnes, Chance Tucker
Injured Kevin Bauman (TE), Michael Carmody (OL), Deion Colzie (WR), Mitchell Evans (TE), Aiden Gobaira (DL), Aidan Keanaaina (DL), Matt Salerno (WR), Rocco Spindler (OL)

Special teams
PK Spencer Shrader
Zac Yoakam
P Bryce McFerson
Ben Krimm
KR Devyn Ford
Jadarian Price
PR Chris Tyree
Jordan Faison
LS Michael Vinson
Rino Monteforte
H Bryce McFerson

RB
Audric Estimé
Gi'Bran Payne
Jadarian Price
Devyn Ford
Jeremiyah Love
