= Rico Flores Jr. =

American football player (born 2004)

No. 1 – Virginia Cavaliers
- Position: Wide receiver
- Class: Senior

Personal information
- Born: December 30, 2004 (age 21)
- Listed height: 6 ft 2 in (1.88 m)
- Listed weight: 211 lb (96 kg)

Career information
- High school: Folsom (Folsom, California)
- College: Notre Dame (2023); UCLA (2024–2025); Virginia (2026–present)
- Stats at ESPN

Enrico Flores Jr. (born December 30, 2004) is an American college football wide receiver for the Virginia Cavaliers of the Atlantic Coast Conference (ACC). He previously played for the Notre Dame Fighting Irish and UCLA Bruins.

== Early life ==
Flores attended Folsom High School in Folsom, California. He played four years of high school football and was the starting wide receiver in the final two years. During his sophomore season, Flores caught 31 passes for 606 yards and 10 touchdowns. In his junior season, Flores had 1,157 yards on 81 receptions and 11 touchdowns. Finally, in his senior season, Flores had 72 receptions for 1,081 yards and eight touchdowns. He finished his high school career with 201 receptions for 3,222 yards and 32 touchdowns. In 2023, Flores made the All-American Bowl roster.

Rated a four-star recruit, Flores committed to the University of Notre Dame to play college football. He committed to Notre Dame over offers from Ohio State, Georgia, Alabama, Texas, LSU, USC, and Oregon, among others.

== College career ==
=== Notre Dame (2023) ===
Flores came into Notre Dame as an early enrollee in winter. He started the 2023 season making his debut against Navy, catching a two-yard pass during 42–3 win. He earned his first start against Central Michigan, catching three passes for 60 yards in the 41–17 win. Against Ohio State, Flores caught his first career touchdown pass late in the fourth quarter to put the Irish up by four. Notre Dame couldn't hold on, losing, 17–14. Against Duke, Flores caught two passes for 28 yards and converted a two-point conversion in the 21–14 win. Against Pittsburgh, Flores caught two passes for a career-high 72 yards in the 58–7 win. After finishing the season with 27 catches for 392 yards and one touchdown, Flores entered the NCAA transfer portal on December 1.

=== UCLA (2024–2025) ===
On December 15, 2023, Flores announced that he would be transferring to UCLA, a school that recruited him out of high school.

=== Virginia (2025–present) ===
On January 13, 2026, Flores announced that he would be transferring to Virginia with two years left of eligibility.

== Career statistics ==
Year	Team	GP	Receiving			
Year	Team	GP	Rec	Yds	Avg	TD
2023	Notre Dame	12	27	392	14.5	1
2024	UCLA	4	12	187	15.6	1
2025	UCLA	8	26	274	10.5	0
2026	Virginia	4	12	158	13.2	1
Career		28	77	1,011	13.1	3
