= Jaiden Ausberry =

American football player

No. 4 – Notre Dame Fighting Irish
- Position: Linebacker
- Class: Senior

Personal information
- Listed height: 6 ft 1 in (1.85 m)
- Listed weight: 226 lb (103 kg)

Career information
- High school: University Lab (Baton Rouge, Louisiana)
- College: Notre Dame (2023–present)
- Stats at ESPN

Jaiden Alexander Ausberry is an American college football linebacker for the Notre Dame Fighting Irish.

== Early life ==
Ausberry attended Louisiana State University Laboratory School in Baton Rouge, Louisiana, where he played high school football for the Cubs. As a junior, he helped the team win the Division II state championship. As a senior, he was a finalist for the Butkus Award and was selected to play in the Under Armour All-America Game. He finished as the school's all-time leader in tackles.

Ausberry was rated as a consensus four-star recruit. He narrowed his list of college offers to his top six choices: Alabama, Auburn, Florida, LSU, Michigan, and Notre Dame. On August 4, 2022, Ausberry committed to playing college football at the University of Notre Dame. He signed with the Notre Dame during the early signing period in December.

== College career ==
As a freshman in 2023, Ausberry played mostly on special teams. He recorded three tackles in five games and was redshirted. Following a strong offseason, Ausberry earned a bigger role on the team ahead of the 2024 season. He played in all 16 games, including the CFP National Championship. Ausberry also made two starts versus Army and Navy due to his capabilities against the triple option. He finished the year with 58 tackles, 6.5 tackles for loss, 0.5 sacks, two fumble recoveries, and one pass deflection. Following Jack Kiser's departure to the NFL, Ausberry competed for a starting job at will linebacker ahead of the 2025 season. He was named the backup to starter Jaylen Sneed to open the season. Ausberry played in all 12 games and started the final 10. He tallied 51 tackles, four tackles for loss, two sacks, and one forced fumble.

Ausberry was named the starting will linebacker to open the 2026 season.

== Personal life ==
Ausberry is the son of Verge Ausberry, the athletic director of Louisiana State University. He said he was never pressured into football by his father and was instead inspired by watching the LSU and University Lab football teams in Baton Rouge. His older brother, Austin, played college football at LSU and Auburn.

Ausberry is the godson of former Notre Dame wide receiver Michael Haywood.
