= 2023 Central Michigan Chippewas football team =

American college football season

2023 Central Michigan Chippewas football
- Conference: Mid-American Conference
- West Division
- Record: 5–7 (3–5 MAC)
- Head coach: Jim McElwain (5th season)
- Offensive coordinator: Paul Petrino (2nd season)
- Offensive scheme: Multiple
- Defensive coordinator: Robb Akey (5th season)
- Base defense: 4–3
- Home stadium: Kelly/Shorts Stadium

2023 Mid-American Conference football standings
	Conf.			Overall
Team	W		L	W		L
East Division
Miami (OH) xy$	7	–	1	11	–	3
Ohio	6	–	2	10	–	3
Bowling Green	5	–	3	7	–	6
Buffalo	3	–	5	3	–	9
Akron	1	–	7	2	–	10
Kent State	0	–	8	1	–	11
West Division
Toledo xy	8	–	0	11	–	3
Northern Illinois	5	–	3	7	–	6
Eastern Michigan	4	–	4	6	–	7
Central Michigan	3	–	5	5	–	7
Ball State	3	–	5	4	–	8
Western Michigan	3	–	5	4	–	8
Championship: Miami (OH) 23, Toledo 14
$ – Conference champion; x – Division champion/co-champions; y – Championship game participant

The 2023 Central Michigan Chippewas football team represented Central Michigan University in the 2023 NCAA Division I FBS football season. They were led by fifth-year head coach Jim McElwain and played their home games at Kelly/Shorts Stadium as members of the West Division of the Mid-American Conference (MAC). They finished the season 5–7 and 3–5 in conference play

The Central Michigan Chippewas football team drew an average home attendance of 16,350 in 2023.

== Preseason ==
=== Preseason coaches poll ===
On July 20, the MAC announced the preseason coaches poll. Central Michigan was picked to finish fourth in the West Division.

== Schedule ==
Date	Time	Opponent	Site	TV	Result	Attendance
September 1	7:00 p.m.	at Michigan State*	Spartan Stadium; East Lansing, MI	FS1	L 7–31	73,216
September 9	1:30 p.m.	No. 11 New Hampshire* (FCS)	Kelly/Shorts Stadium; Mount Pleasant, MI	ESPN+	W 45–42	17,302
September 16	2:30 p.m.	at No. 9 Notre Dame*	Notre Dame Stadium; South Bend, IN	Peacock	L 17–41	77,622
September 23	5:00 p.m.	at South Alabama*	Hancock Whitney Stadium; Mobile, AL	ESPN+	W 34–30	18,369
September 30	1:30 p.m.	Eastern Michigan	Kelly/Shorts Stadium; Mount Pleasant, MI (rivalry)	ESPN+	W 26–23	28,323
October 7	2:00 p.m.	at Buffalo	University at Buffalo Stadium; Amherst, NY	ESPN+	L 13–37	12,093
October 14	3:30 p.m.	Akron^{†}	Kelly/Shorts Stadium; Mount Pleasant, MI	ESPN+	W 17–10	17,886
October 21	3:30 p.m.	at Ball State	Scheumann Stadium; Muncie, IN	ESPN+	L 17–24	15,171
October 31	7:00 p.m.	Northern Illinois	Kelly/Shorts Stadium; Mount Pleasant, MI	ESPNU	W 37–31	9,625
November 7	7:00 p.m.	at Western Michigan	Waldo Stadium; Kalamazoo, MI (rivalry))	ESPNU	L 28–38	17,841
November 15	7:00 p.m.	at Ohio	Peden Stadium; Athens, OH	ESPNU	L 20–34	14,736
November 24	12:00 p.m.	Toledo	Kelly/Shorts Stadium; Mount Pleasant, MI	ESPNU	L 17–32	8,612
*Non-conference game; ^{†}Homecoming; Rankings from AP Poll released prior to the game; All times are in Eastern time

== Game summaries ==
=== at Michigan State ===
Central Michigan Chippewas (0–0) at Michigan State Spartans (0–0) – Game Summary

Quarter	1	2	3	4	Total
Chippewas	0	7	0	0	7
Spartans	0	10	7	14	31

at Spartan Stadium • East Lansing, Michigan

- Date: September 1st
- Game time: 7:00 p.m. EST/4:00 p.m. PST
- Game weather: 76 °F (24 °C), Wind: 4 mph S, Sunny
- Game attendance: 73,216
- Referee: Gregory Blum
- TV announcers (FS1): Tim Brando (play-by-play), Spencer Tillman (analyst)
- Sources

Game information

Second quarter

- (06:55) MSU FG: Jonathan Kim 47-yard field goal MSU 3–0; 5 plays, 16 yards, 1:22
- (01:51) CMU TD: Chris Parker 12-yard pass from Bert Emanuel Jr. (Tristan Mattson kick) CMU 7–3; 3 plays, 70 yards, 1:20
- (00:48) MSU TD: Nate Carter 2-yard run (Jonathan Kim kick ) MSU 10–7; 7 plays, 84 yards, 0:57

Third quarter

- (02:41) MSU TD: Jalen Berger 12-yard run (Jonathan Kim kick) MSU 17–7 MSU; 5 plays, 45 yards, 2:50

Fourth quarter

- (13:26) MSU TD: Tyrell Henry 10-yard pass from Noah Kim (Jonathan Kim kick) MSU 24–7; 3 plays, 82 yards, 1:24
- (09:05) MSU TD: Maliq Carr 8-yard pass from Noah Kim (Stephen Rusnak kick) MSU 31–7; 5 plays, 55 yards, 2:22

Statistics	Central Michigan	Michigan State
First downs	19	20
Plays–yards	67–219	64–406
Rushes–yards	41–123	25–127
Passing yards	96	279
Passing: comp–att–int	12–24–1	18–32–0
Turnovers		
Time of possession	34:26	25:34

Team	Category	Player	Statistics
Central Michigan	Passing	Bert Emanuel Jr.	11/17, 87 yards, 1 TD, 1 INT
Central Michigan	Rushing	Bert Emanuel Jr.	17 carries, 41 yards
Central Michigan	Receiving	Mitchel Collier	3 receptions, 30 yards
Michigan State	Passing	Noah Kim	18/31, 279 yards, 2 TD
Michigan State	Rushing	Nate Carter	18 carries, 113 yards, 1 TD
Michigan State	Receiving	Jaron Glover	3 receptions, 75 yards

=== No. 11 New Hampshire (FCS) ===
New Hampshire Wildcats (1-0) at Central Michigan Chippewas (0–1) - Game Summary

Quarter	1	2	3	4	Total
Wildcats	7	14	7	14	42
Chippewas	7	21	7	10	45

at Kelly/Shorts Stadium · Mt. Pleasant, MI

- Date: September 9th
- Game time: 1:30pm EST
- Game weather: Temperature: 68°F, Wind: SW 3mph, Weather: Sunny
- Game attendance: 17,302
- TV: ESPN+
- box score

Game information

First quarter

- 13:02 CMU - Bert Emanuel, Jr. 66 yd run (Tristan Mattson kick), (4 plays, 75 yards, TOP 01:58; UNH 0, CMU 7)
- 06:58 UNH - Logan Tomlinson 8 yd pass from Max Brosmer (Nick Mazzie kick), (13 plays, 75 yards, TOP 06:05; UNH 7, CMU 7)

Second quarter

- 14:23 CMU - Bert Emanuel, Jr. 5 yd run (Tristan Mattson kick), (5 plays, 73 yards, TOP 02:31; UNH 7, CMU 14)
- 11:41 UNH - Dylan Laube 80 yd pass from Max Brosmer (Nick Mazzie kick), (1 play, 80 yards, TOP 00:11; UNH 14, CMU 14)
- 11:24 CMU - Marion Lukes 86 yd kickoff return (Tristan Mattson kick), (UNH 14, CMU 21)
- 05:10 CMU - Tyson Davis 31 yd pass from Bert Emanuel, Jr. (Tristan Mattson kick), (7 plays, 71 yards, TOP 03:29; UNH 14, CMU 28)
- 01:10 UNH - Caleb Burke 21 yd pass from Max Brosmer (Nick Mazzie kick), (4 plays, 33 yards, TOP 00:21; UNH 21, CMU 28)

Third quarter

- 07:13 CMU - Myles Bailey 1 yd run (Tristan Mattson kick), (10 plays, 67 yards, TOP 03:44; UNH 21, CMU 35)
- 03:51 UNH - Myles Thomason 12 yd run (Nick Mazzie kick), (6 plays, 75 yards, TOP 03:22; UNH 28, CMU 35)

Forth quarter

- 09:08 CMU - Jesse Prewitt III 32 yd pass from Bert Emanuel, Jr. (Tristan Mattson kick), (3 plays, 32 yards, TOP 00:48; UNH 28, CMU 42)
- 05:58 UNH - Dylan Laube 2 yd run (Nick Mazzie kick), (9 plays, 75 yards, TOP 03:10; UNH 35, CMU 42)
- 03:14 UNH - Dylan Laube 71 yd pass from Max Brosmer (Nick Mazzie kick), (1 play, 71 yards, TOP 00:12; UNH 42, CMU 42)
- 00:00 CMU - Tristan Mattson 47 yd field goal, (13 plays, 43 yards, TOP 03:07; UNH 42, CMU 45)

Statistics	UNH	CMU
First downs	24	19
Plays–yards	66–538	72–440
Rushes–yards	14–45	52–236
Passing yards	493	204
Passing: comp–att–int	32–52–1	8–20–2
Turnovers		
Time of possession	28:02	31:49

Team	Category	Player	Statistics
UNH	Passing	Max Brosmer	32/51, 493 yards, 4 TD, 1 INT
UNH	Rushing	Dylan Laube	7 carries, 30 yards, 1 TD
UNH	Receiving	Dylan Laube	12 receptions, 295 yards, 2 TD
CMU	Passing	Bert Emanuel, Jr.	7/19, 193 yards, 2 TD, 2 INT
CMU	Rushing	Myles Bailey	21 carries, 108 yards, 1 TD
CMU	Receiving	Chris Parker	3 receptions, 124 yards

=== at No. 9 Notre Dame ===
Central Michigan Chippewas (1–1) vs No. 9 Notre Dame Fighting Irish (3–0) – Game summary

Quarter	1	2	3	4	Total
Chippewas	7	7	3	0	17
No. 9 Fighting Irish	14	7	10	10	41

at Notre Dame Stadium • Notre Dame, IN

- Date: September 16, 2023
- Game time: 2:30 p.m.
- Game weather: Sunny, 71 °F (22 °C)
- Game attendance: 77,622
- Referee: Jerry Magallanes
- TV announcers (Peacock): Jac Collinsworth (play-by-play), Jason Garrett (analyst), Zora Stephenson (sideline)

Game information

First quarter

- (10:52) ND – Tobias Merriweather 75-yard pass from Sam Hartman, Spencer Shrader kick (Drive: 4 plays, 91 yards, 2:03; Notre Dame 7–0)
- (7:22) CMU – Myles Bailey 6-yard rush, Tristan Mattson kick (Drive: 6 plays, 65 yards, 3:30; Tied 7–7)
- (2:13) ND – Audric Estimé 17-yard rush, Spencer Shrader kick (Drive: 11 plays, 75 yards, 5:09; Notre Dame 14–7)

Second quarter

- (14:17) ND – Chris Tyree 76-yard pass from Sam Hartman, Spencer Shrader kick (Drive: 3 plays, 87 yards, 1:18; Notre Dame 21–7)
- (0:17) CMU – Jase Bauer 1-yard rush, Tristan Mattson kick (Drive: 9 plays, 83 yards, 3:58; Notre Dame 21–14)

Third quarter

- (11:36) ND – Sam Hartman 1-yard rush, Spencer Shrader kick (Drive: 7 plays, 74 yards, 3:19; Notre Dame 28–14)
- (1:59) CMU – Tristan Mattson 23-yard field goal (Drive: 12 plays, 50 yards, 5:37; Notre Dame 28–17)
- (0:30) ND – Spencer Shrader 50-yard field goal (Drive: 5 plays, 43 yards, 1:29; Notre Dame 31–17)

Fourth quarter

- (10:07) ND – Spencer Shrader 31-yard field goal (Drive: 10 plays, 47 yards, 3:54; Notre Dame 34–17)
- (5:45) ND – Holden Staes 4-yard pass from Sam Hartman, Spencer Shrader kick (Drive: 6 plays, 82 yards, 2:51; Notre Dame 41–17)

Statistics	CMU	ND
First downs	14	23
Total yards	268	578
Rushes/yards	34–131	37–263
Passing yards	137	342
Passing: Comp–Att–Int	10–20–0	17–28–0
Time of possession	29:27	30:33

Team	Category	Player	Statistics
Central Michigan	Passing	Jase Bauer	10/20, 137 yards
Central Michigan	Rushing	Myles Bailey	12 carries, 59 yards, TD
Central Michigan	Receiving	Jesse Prewitt III	2 receptions, 59 yards
Notre Dame	Passing	Sam Hartman	16/26, 330 yards, 3 TD
Notre Dame	Rushing	Audric Estimé	20 carries, 176 yards, TD
Notre Dame	Receiving	Tobias Merriweather	3 receptions, 91 yards, TD

=== at South Alabama ===
Central Michigan Chippewas (1–2) at South Alabama Jaguars (2–1)

Quarter	1	2	3	4	Total
Chippewas	0	13	7	14	34
Jaguars	14	0	3	13	30

at Hancock Whitney Stadium, Mobile, AL

- Date: September 23, 2023
- Game time: 4:00 p.m. CDT
- Game weather: Sunny • Temperature: 90 °F (32 °C) • Wind: SW 5 mph
- Game attendance: 18,369
- Referee: Marshall Lewis
- TV: ESPN+

Game information

First Quarter

- (9:02) USA – La'Damian Webb 3-yard run, Diego Guajardo kick (Drive: 9 plays, 75 yards, 3:38; South Alabama 7–0)
- (4:23) USA – Caullin Lacy 35-yard pass from Carter Bradley, Diego Guajardo kick (Drive: 6 plays, 71 yards, 2:37; South Alabama 14–0)

Second Quarter

- (13:37) CMU – Jase Bauer 15-yard run, Tristan Mattson kick (Drive: 11 plays, 75 yards, 5:46; South Alabama 14–7)
- (4:13) CMU – Jase Bauer 1-yard run (Drive: 14 plays, 69 yards, 7:41; South Alabama 14–13)

Third Quarter

- (8:31) CMU – Jase Bauer 1-yard run, Tristan Mattson kick (Drive: 10 plays, 56 yards, 5:35; Central Michigan 20–14)
- (0:53) USA – Diego Guajardo 32-yard field goal (Drive: 12 plays, 61 yards, 5:45; Central Michigan 20–17)

Fourth Quarter

- (14:47) CMU – Jesse Prewitt III 70-yard pass from Jase Bauer, Tristan Mattson kick (Drive: 3 plays, 75 yards, 1:06; Central Michigan 27–17)
- (13:27) USA – Caullin Lacy 72-yard pass from Carter Bradley (Drive: 3 plays, 75 yards, 1:20; Central Michigan 27–23)
- (2:42) USA – La'Damian Webb 1-yard run, Diego Guajardo kick (Drive: 8 plays, 59 yards, 3:27; South Alabama 30–27)
- (0:13) CMU – Jase Bauer 4-yard run, Tristan Mattson kick (Drive: 11 plays, 75 yards, 2:29; Central Michigan 34–30)

Statistics	CMU	USA
First downs	19	19
Total yards	355	405
Rushing yards	8	8
Passing yards	8	10
Passing: Comp–Att–Int	20–31–0	17–27–0
Time of possession	33:44	26:16

Team	Category	Player	Statistics
Central Michigan	Passing	Jase Bauer	19/30, 224 yards, TD
Central Michigan	Rushing	Jase Bauer	15 carries, 55 yards, 4 TD
Central Michigan	Receiving	Jesse Prewitt III	10 receptions, 142 yards, TD
South Alabama	Passing	Carter Bradley	17/27, 254 yards, 2 TD
South Alabama	Rushing	La'Damian Webb	18 carries, 68 yards, 2 TD
South Alabama	Receiving	Caullin Lacy	6 receptions, 132 yards, 2 TD

=== at Buffalo ===
Central Michigan Chippewas (3–2) at Buffalo Bulls (1–4) – Game summary

Quarter	1	2	3	4	Total
Chippewas	0	7	0	6	13
Bulls	10	13	14	0	37

at University at Buffalo Stadium • Amherst, New York

- Date: October 7, 2023
- Game time: 2:00 p.m.
- Game weather: 55 °F (13 °C); Cloudy; Wind at SW12 MPH
- Game attendance: 12,093
- Referee: Rich Edwards
- TV: ESPN+
- Boxscore

Game information

First quarter

- (12:15) BUF - Devin Grant 29 Yd Interception Return, Alex McNulty Kick (Drive: 3 plays, 76 yards, 0:47; Buffalo 7-0)
- (3:10) BUF - Alex McNulty 19 Yd Field Goal (Drive: 9 plays, 61 yards, 3:46; Buffalo 10-0)

Second quarter

- (10:57) CMU - Jesse Prewitt III 2 Yd pass from Jase Bauer, Tristan Mattson Kick (Drive: 18 plays, 75 yards, 7:13; Buffalo 10-7)
- (5:00) BUF - Alex McNulty 44 Yd Field Goal (Drive: 13 plays, 50 yards, 5:48; Buffalo 13-7)
- (1:48) BUF - Ron Cook Jr. 3 Yd Run, Alex McNulty Kick (Drive: 5 plays, 43 yards, 2:28; Buffalo 20-7)
- (0:00) BUF - Alex McNulty 48 Yd Field Goal (Drive: 5 plays, 18 yards, 1:05; Buffalo 23-7)

Third quarter

- (13:16) BUF - Devin Grant 58 Yd Interception Return, Alex McNulty Kick (Drive: 4 plays, 75 yards, 1:44; Buffalo 30-7)
- (9:19) BUF - Ron Cook Jr. 1 Yd Run, Alex McNulty Kick (Drive: 6 plays, 47 yards, 1:56; Buffalo 37-7)

Fourth quarter

- (2:43) CMU - Tyson Davis 5 Yd pass from Jase Bauer, Two-Point Pass Conversion Failed (Drive: 10 plays, 80 yards, 3:38; Buffalo 37-13)

Statistics	CMU	UB
First downs	21	18
Plays–yards	74–360	67–355
Rushes–yards	25–80	35–123
Passing yards	280	232
Passing: comp–att–int	28–49–3	20–32–0
Turnovers		
Time of possession	27:43	32:17

Team	Category	Player	Statistics
Central Michigan	Passing	Jase Bauer	28/49, 280 yards, 2 TD, 3 INT
Central Michigan	Rushing	Jase Bauer	6 carries, 31 yards
Central Michigan	Receiving	Marion Lukes	7 receptions, 73 yards
Buffalo	Passing	Cole Snyder	20/32, 232 yards
Buffalo	Rushing	Ron Cook	11 carries, 53 yards, 2 TD
Buffalo	Receiving	Boobie Curry	4 receptions, 74 yards

=== at Ohio ===
Central Michigan Chippewas (5-5) at Ohio Bobcats (7–3)

Quarter	1	2	3	4	Total
Central Michigan	0	7	7	6	20
Ohio	10	7	14	3	34

at Peden Stadium • Athens, OH

- Date: Wednesday, November 15, 2023
- Game time: 7:00 p.m. EDT
- Game weather: Sunny, Temperature: 50 °F (10 °C), Wind: SW 14mph
- Game attendance: 14,736
- Referee: Andrew Speciale
- TV announcers (ESPN2/ESPNU): Jason Ross, Dustin Fox
- Recap box score

Game information

First Quarter

- (9:49) OHIO - Gianni Spetic 39 Yd Field Goal (Drive: 7 plays, 41 yards, 3:56; Ohio 3-0)
- (6:19) OHIO - Shane Bonner 21 Yd Interception Return, Gianni Spetic Kick (Drive: 1 play, 0 yards, 0:08; Ohio 10-0)

Second Quarter

- (8:19) OHIO - O'Shaan Allison 1 Yd Run, Gianni Spetic Kick (Drive: 8 plays, 87 yards, 4:38; Ohio 17-0)
- (4:38) CMU - Tyson Davis 50 Yd pass from Jase Bauer, Tristan Mattson Kick (Drive: 7 plays, 60 yards, 3:36; Ohio 17-7)

Third Quarter

- (10:34) OHIO - Kurtis Rourke 16 Yd Run, Gianni Spetic Kick (Drive: 8 plays, 75 yards, 4:20; Ohio 24-7)
- (9:40) CMU - Chris Parker 62 Yd pass from Jase Bauer, Tristan Mattson Kick (Drive: 2 plays, 64 yards, 0:47; Ohio 24-14)
- (4:11) OHIO - O'Shaan Allison 1 Yd Run, Gianni Spetic Kick (Drive: 10 plays, 73 yards, 5:22; Ohio 31-14)

Forth Quarter

- (14:18) CMU - Marion Lukes 14 Yd Run, Tristan Mattson PAT failed (Drive: 8 plays, 53 yards, 4:48; Ohio 31-20)
- (6:07) OHIO - Gianni Spetic 33 Yd Field Goal (Drive: 4 plays, 6 yards, 1:40; Ohio 34-20)

Statistics	CMU	OHIO
First downs	13	21
Plays–yards	54–319	65–377
Rushes–yards	33–162	41–148
Passing yards	157	229
Passing: comp–att–int	10–21–1	16–24–0
Turnovers		
Time of possession	22:51	37:09

Team	Category	Player	Statistics
CMU	Passing	Jase Bauer	10/21, 157 yards, 2 TD, 1 INT
CMU	Rushing	Marion Lukes	15 carries, 75 yards, 1 TD
CMU	Receiving	Chris Parker	1 reception, 62 yards, 1 TD
OHIO	Passing	Kurtis Rourke	15/23, 222 yards
OHIO	Rushing	Sieh Bangura	21 carries, 126 yards
OHIO	Receiving	Miles Cross	3 receptions, 53 yards
