= Bert Emanuel Jr. =

American football player (born 2003)

No. 5 – San Diego State Aztecs
- Position: Wide receiver
- Class: Redshirt Senior

Personal information
- Born: November 7, 2003 (age 23); Houston, Texas, U.S.
- Listed height: 6 ft 3 in (1.91 m)
- Listed weight: 230 lb (104 kg)

Career information
- High school: Ridge Point (Sienna, Texas)
- College: Central Michigan (2022–2024); San Diego State (2025–present)
- Stats at ESPN

Bert Emanuel Jr. (born November 7, 2003) is an American college football quarterback for the San Diego State Aztecs. He previously played for the Central Michigan Chippewas.

== Early life ==
Emanuel grew up in Houston, Texas, and attended Ridge Point High School where he was named Player of the Year by Fox and also went his entire senior season throwing 0 interceptions while passing for 2654 yds - 31 TD's and rushing for 1,022 yds and 15 TD's. He was rated a three-star recruit and committed to play college football at Central Michigan over offers from Lamar, Abilene Christian, Army and Texas Southern.

== College career ==
=== Central Michigan ===
Emanuel began the 2022 season as a true freshman third-string quarterback behind starter Daniel Richardson and Jase Bauer. He made his collegiate debut in Week 9 against Northern Illinois, recording 30 rushing yards on six attempts in a victory. The following week against Buffalo, he relieved Richardson and rushed for 293 yards and three touchdowns on 24 attempts, the fourth-most rushing yards in a game in program history, while averaging 12.2 yards per carry and completing one of three passing attempts for 22 yards. For his performance, he was named the Earl Campbell Tyler Rose Award National Player of the Week and the Mid-American Conference Offensive Player of the Week. He made his first collegiate start the following week against Western Michigan, completing all three of his pass attempts for 32 yards while rushing for 98 yards and a touchdown in a 12–10 loss. He came off the bench and split time with Bauer in the season finale against Eastern Michigan, rushing for 75 yards and three touchdowns in a 38–19 loss. On the season, he appeared in four games with one start, completing 4 of 8 passes for 54 yards while rushing for 496 yards and seven touchdowns on 67 carries. He averaged 7.4 yards per carry and 124 rushing yards per game and recorded three runs of at least 60 yards. He preserved his redshirt by appearing in only four games.

With Richardson transferring, Emanuel Jr. won the starting quarterback competition over Bauer. He was named to the Earl Campbell Tyler Rose Award Watch List. Emanuel began the 2023 season as the starting quarterback against Michigan State, completing 11 of 17 passes for 87 yards with one touchdown and one interception while adding 41 rushing yards in a 31–7 loss. The following week against New Hampshire, he completed 7 of 19 passes for 193 yards with two touchdowns and two interceptions while rushing for 101 yards and two touchdowns in a 45–42 victory. For his performance, he was named the Mid-American Conference West Offensive Player of the Week. He missed the following game against Notre Dame due to illness. He returned as the starter against South Alabama but was replaced by Bauer due to ineffectiveness in the first half. Emanuel played sparingly for the remainder of the season. He appeared in six games with three starts, going 2–1 as a starter while completing 19 of 37 passes for 286 yards, three touchdowns and three interceptions and rushing for 220 yards and two touchdowns.

With Bauer transferring, transfer Joey Labas was named the starting quarterback, while Emanuel Jr. missed the first three games of the season with an offseason injury. He made his season debut in Week 4 against Ball State, contributing three total touchdowns in a 37–34 victory. In Week 7 against Eastern Michigan, he completed 3 of 4 passes for 92 yards and a touchdown while adding 63 rushing yards and a touchdown before suffering a season-ending ankle injury. On the season, he appeared in three games, completing 4 of 6 passes for 99 yards and two touchdowns while rushing for 128 yards and three touchdowns on 28 carries. On November 21, 2024, Emanuel Jr. entered the NCAA transfer portal.

=== San Diego State ===
After entering the transfer portal, Emanuel Jr. committed to San Diego State. Emanuel Jr. began the 2025 season as the backup quarterback to Jayden Denegal. He made his Aztecs debut in the season-opening win against Stony Brook, completing 3 of 4 passes for 29 yards while adding 23 rushing yards. Over the course of the regular season, Emanuel Jr. was used in designed formations, primarily as a running threat. In the 2025 New Mexico Bowl against No. 25 North Texas, he was named the starting quarterback but suffered a game-ending shoulder injury midway through the second quarter. He completed 4 of 7 passes for 37 yards while adding 170 rushing yards on 11 carries and two touchdowns, including a 72-yard touchdown run, in the 49–47 loss. On the season, he appeared in 11 games with one start, completing 9 of 16 passes for 74 yards and rushing for 272 yards and two touchdowns.

Prior to the start of the 2026 season, Emanuel Jr. switched to wide receiver.

=== Statistics ===
Year	Team	Games			Passing								Rushing			
Year	Team	GP	GS	Record	Cmp	Att	Pct	Yds	Avg	TD	INT	Rtg	Att	Yds	Avg	TD
2022	Central Michigan	4	1	0–1	4	8	50.0	54	6.8	0	0	106.7	67	496	7.4	7
2023	Central Michigan	6	3	2–1	19	37	51.4	286	7.7	3	3	126.8	50	220	4.4	2
2024	Central Michigan	3	0	—	4	6	66.7	99	16.5	2	0	315.3	28	128	4.6	3
2025	San Diego State	11	1	0–1	9	16	56.3	74	4.6	0	0	95.1	33	272	8.2	2
2026	San Diego State	0	0	—	0	0	0.0	0	0.0	0	0	0.0	0	0	0.0	0
Career		24	5	2–3	36	67	53.7	513	7.7	5	3	133.7	178	1,116	6.3	14

== Personal life ==
Emanuel is the son of former National Football League wide receiver, Bert Emanuel.

His cousins, Ben Emanuel, Derrick Johnson, and Dwight Johnson also played in the NFL. In addition, Former WMBA Basketball star Plenette Pierson is also a cousin. Closer to home his sisters, Sydni Emanuel and Cortni Emanuel played at the University of Georgia (softball) and Brittni Emanuel ran track at North Texas University.
