= Jaylen Sneed =

American football player (born 2004)

No. 3 – Notre Dame Fighting Irish
- Position: Linebacker
- Class: Fifth year

Personal information
- Born: March 11, 2004 (age 22)
- Listed height: 6 ft 1 in (1.85 m)
- Listed weight: 227 lb (103 kg)

Career information
- High school: Hilton Head
- College: Notre Dame (2022–present)

Awards and highlights
- Mr. Football Award (South Carolina) (2021)
- Stats at ESPN

Jaylen Jerrold Sneed (born March 11, 2004) is an American college football linebacker for the Notre Dame Fighting Irish.

== Early life ==
Sneed attended Hilton Head Island High School in Hilton Head Island, South Carolina where he played quarterback and linebacker. In 2021, he was named South Carolina Mr. Football. He committed to play college football for the Notre Dame Fighting Irish.

== College career ==
Sneed played in four games as a freshman. As a redshirt freshman, he played in all thirteen games, including starting the season opener against Navy in place of an injured JD Bertrand. He began his redshirt sophomore season as the team's starting Rover.

=== College statistics ===
Year	Team	GP	Tackles				Interceptions				Fumbles		
Year	Team	GP	Total	Solo	Ast	Sack	PD	Int	Yds	TD	FF	FR	TD
2022	Notre Dame	4	7	1	6	0.0	0	0	0	0	0	0	0
2023	Notre Dame	13	14	5	9	1.0	2	0	0	0	1	0	0
2024	Notre Dame	16	51	22	29	2.5	0	0	0	0	2	1	1
2025	Notre Dame	12	35	23	12	3.0	0	0	0	0	1	0	0
2026	Notre Dame	3	10	6	4	0.0	0	0	0	0	0	0	0
Career		48	117	57	60	6.5	2	0	0	0	4	1	1
