= Clarence Lewis (American football) =

American football player (born 2000)

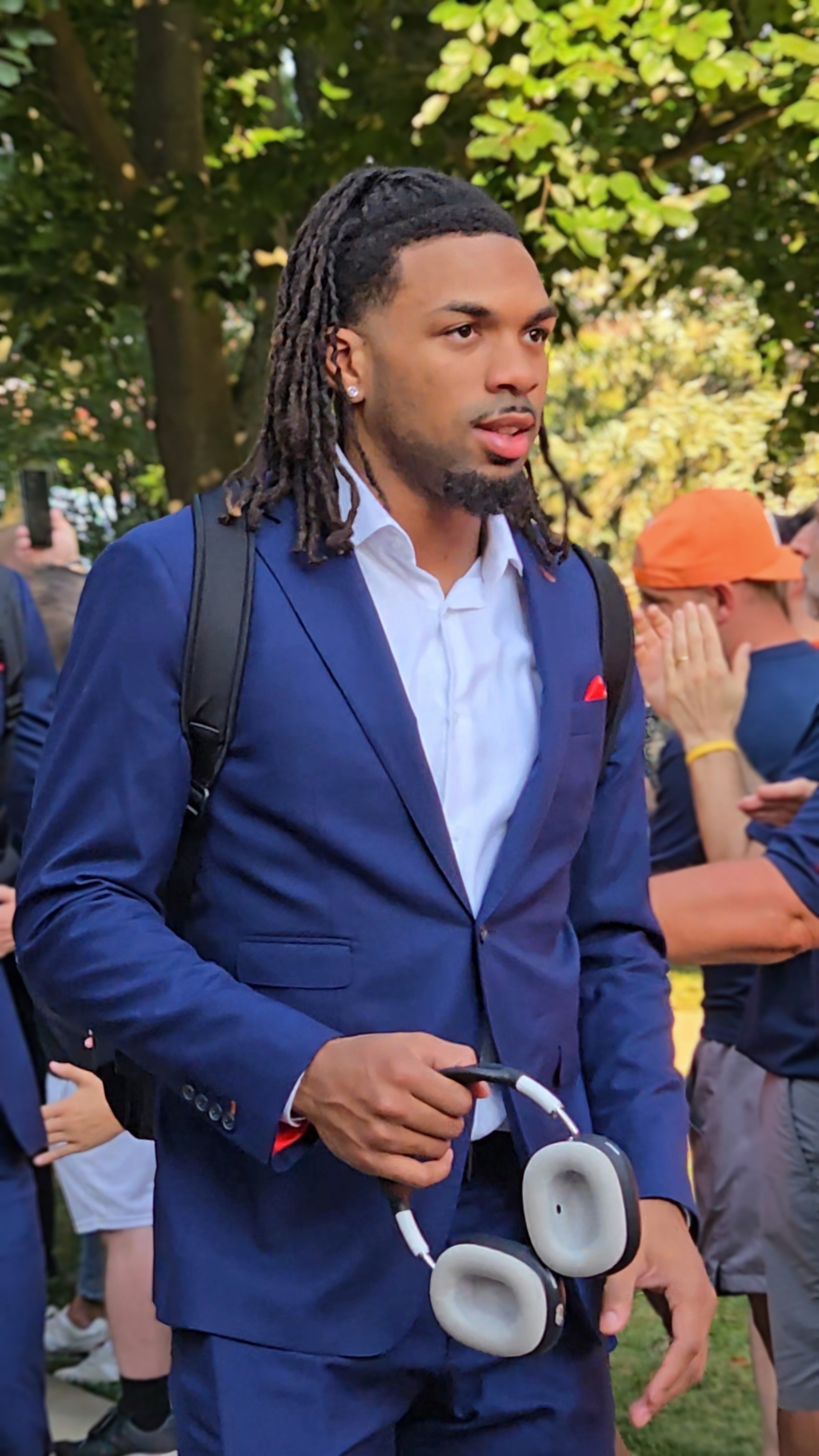
- Lewis at Syracuse University in 2024

Profile
- Position: Cornerback

Personal information
- Born: December 8, 2000 (age 25); Edison, New Jersey, U.S.
- Listed height: 5 ft 10 in (1.78 m)
- Listed weight: 200 lb (91 kg)

Career information
- High school: Mater Dei (Middletown Township, New Jersey)
- College: Notre Dame (2020–2023); Syracuse (2024)
- NFL draft: 2025: undrafted

Career history
- Tennessee Titans (2025)*; Miami Dolphins (2025)*; Houston Gamblers (2026)*; Birmingham Stallions (2026)
- * Offseason or practice squad member only

Awards and highlights
- Third-team All-ACC (2024)
- Stats at Pro Football Reference

Clarence Lewis (born December 8, 2000) is an American professional football cornerback. He played college football for the Notre Dame Fighting Irish and Syracuse Orange.

== Early life ==
Raised in Edison, New Jersey, Lewis attended Mater Dei High School in Monmouth County, New Jersey. He played both sides in high school and posted 39 catches, 639 yards for four touchdowns on offense. On defense, Lewis made three interceptions, helping his team reach the state championship.

Coming out of high school he was rated as a three-star recruit and committed to play college football for the Notre Dame Fighting Irish.

== College career ==
=== Notre Dame ===
Lewis played for the Fighting Irish for four season, appearing in 51 games, making 23 starts with 124 tackles, four tackles-for-loss, three forced fumbles, 18 pass breakups, three interceptions, and a touchdown.

As a freshman in 2021, Lewis appeared in all 12 games, making six starts. He had a streak of 18 consecutive starts during his freshman and sophomore years. In 2023, he appeared in all 13 games, making two starts and finishing with nine tackles, a pick-six and three pass breakups.

He entered the transfer portal on March 29, 2024.

=== Syracuse ===
Lewis transferred to play for the Syracuse Orange and the incoming head coach Fran Brown. Brown had recruited Lewis to play at Rutgers when he was the defensive backs coach for the Rutgers under Greg Schiano.

In the lone year with the Orange, Lewis started every game at corner, making 41 tackles, 1.0 tackle for loss, 12 pass breakups and an interception. He was named Third Team All-ACC, was second in the ACC with 12 pass breakups. His 75.4 Pro Football Focus defensive grade was the second-best among Orange defenders with a minimum of 400 snaps played.

After the season, Lewis declared for the 2025 NFL draft.

=== Statistics ===
Year	Team	GP	Tackles				Interceptions				Fumbles		
Year	Team	GP	Total	Solo	Ast	Sack	PD	Int	Yds	TD	FF	FR	TD
2020	Notre Dame	11	33	29	4	0.0	7	0	0	0	1	0	0
2021	Notre Dame	13	53	44	9	1.0	4	1	4	0	1	0	0
2022	Notre Dame	13	29	23	6	0.0	4	1	0	0	1	1	0
2023	Notre Dame	13	9	8	1	0.0	3	1	33	1	0	0	0
2024	Syracuse	13	41	27	14	0.0	12	1	0	0	0	0	0
Career		63	165	131	34	1.0	30	4	37	1	3	1	0

== Professional career ==
Pre-draft measurables
Height	Weight	Arm length	Hand span	Wingspan	40-yard dash	10-yard split	20-yard split	20-yard shuttle	Three-cone drill	Vertical jump	Broad jump	Bench press
5 ft 10 in (1.78 m)	200 lb (91 kg)	32 1/8 in (0.82 m)	9 5/8 in (0.24 m)	6 ft 5 5/8 in (1.97 m)	4.52 s	1.62 s	2.68 s	4.22 s	7.02 s	29.0 in (0.74 m)	9 ft 7 in (2.92 m)	16 reps
All values from Pro Day

=== Tennessee Titans ===
Lewis signed with the Tennessee Titans as an undrafted free agent on April 26, 2025. He was waived on August 25.

=== Miami Dolphins ===
On November 4, 2025, Lewis signed with the Miami Dolphins' practice squad. He was released by the Dolphins on January 2, 2026.

=== Houston Gamblers ===
On March 2, 2026, Lewis signed with the Houston Gamblers of the United Football League (UFL). He was released on March 19.

=== Birmingham Stallions ===
On April 29, 2026, Lewis was signed by the Birmingham Stallions of the United Football League (UFL).

== Personal life ==
Lewis majored in art and design at Notre Dame and enjoys photography.
