= Ashton Craig =

American football player

No. 70 – Notre Dame Fighting Irish
- Position: Center
- Class: Fifth year

Personal information
- Listed height: 6 ft 5 in (1.96 m)
- Listed weight: 315 lb (143 kg)

Career information
- High school: Lawrenceburg (Lawrenceburg, Indiana)
- College: Notre Dame (2022–present)
- Stats at ESPN

Ashton Wayne Craig is an American college football center for the Notre Dame Fighting Irish.

== Early life ==
Craig grew up in Lawrenceburg, Indiana, and attended Lawrenceburg High School, where he played tackle. He was rated a four-star recruit by 247Sports, and a three-star recruit by Rivals and ESPN. He was named the 2021 Mr. Football Offensive Line in Indiana and was selected to participate in the 2022 All-American Bowl. He committed to play college football for the Notre Dame Fighting Irish.

== College career ==
Craig did not appear in a game as a true freshman in 2022.

Craig appeared in eight games during the 2023 season, starting the last three at center after an injury to Zeke Correll. He earned All-Bowl Team honors in the Sun Bowl and was part of the Joe Moore Award semifinalist offensive line.

Craig entered 2024 as Notre Dame's starting center, starting the first three games before tearing his left ACL against Purdue.

Coogan transferred after the 2024 season, allowing Craig to return as starting center for 2025. He was named to the Rimington Trophy Watch List. He started six games before tearing his right ACL against NC State.
