= Jordan Botelho =

American football player (born 2001)

Profile
- Position: Linebacker

Personal information
- Born: May 16, 2001 (age 25)
- Listed height: 6 ft 2 in (1.88 m)
- Listed weight: 247 lb (112 kg)

Career information
- High school: Saint Louis (Honolulu, Hawaii)
- College: Notre Dame (2020–2025)
- NFL draft: 2026: undrafted

Career history
- Minnesota Vikings (2026)*
- * Offseason or practice squad member only

Jordan Kalani Song Su Oh Botelho (born May 16, 2001) is an American professional football linebacker. He played college football for the Notre Dame Fighting Irish and he was signed as an undrafted free agent by the Minnesota Vikings in 2026.

== Early life ==
Botelho attended Saint Louis School in Honolulu, Hawaii, where he played linebacker under coach Cal Lee. He won three straight Hawaii football state championships and committed to the University of Notre Dame to play college football.

== College career ==
As a true freshman, Botelho played in 11 games and returned a blocked punt for a touchdown in his first collegiate game against South Florida. He made his first start in his sophomore year against Wisconsin at Soldier Field. He converted from linebacker to defensive end before the 2023 season and was named Most Outstanding Lineman in the 2023 Sun Bowl.

=== College statistics ===
Year	Team	GP	Tackles				Interceptions				Fumbles		
Year	Team	GP	Total	Solo	Ast	Sack	PD	Int	Yds	TD	FF	FR	TD
2020	Notre Dame	10	4	2	2	0.0	0	0	0	0	0	0	0
2021	Notre Dame	11	18	11	7	2.0	0	0	0	0	0	0	0
2022	Notre Dame	13	11	9	2	4.5	0	0	0	0	0	0	0
2023	Notre Dame	13	32	18	14	4.0	0	0	0	0	0	0	0
2024	Notre Dame	3	12	5	7	1.0	0	0	0	0	0	0	0
2025	Notre Dame	12	20	10	10	1.0	0	0	0	0	0	0	0
Career		62	97	55	42	12.5	0	0	0	0	0	0	0

== Professional career ==
Pre-draft measurables
Height	Weight	Arm length	Hand span	Wingspan	40-yard dash	10-yard split	20-yard split	20-yard shuttle	Three-cone drill	Vertical jump	Broad jump	Bench press
6 ft 2 1/4 in (1.89 m)	247 lb (112 kg)	31 1/8 in (0.79 m)	9 1/8 in (0.23 m)	6 ft 3 1/8 in (1.91 m)	4.86 s	1.68 s	2.85 s	4.30 s	7.10 s	36.5 in (0.93 m)	9 ft 10 in (3.00 m)	21 reps
All values from Pro Day

Botelho was signed as an undrafted free agent by the Minnesota Vikings after the conclusion of the 2026 NFL draft. He was released by the Vikings on May 14, 2026.

== Personal life ==
Botelho's mother is Korean American.
