= Chau Smith-Wade =

American football player (born 2002)

No. 26 – Carolina Panthers
- Position: Cornerback
- Roster status: Active

Personal information
- Born: September 17, 2002 (age 24); Denver, Colorado, U.S.
- Listed height: 5 ft 11 in (1.80 m)
- Listed weight: 192 lb (87 kg)

Career information
- High school: Simeon Career Academy (Chicago, Illinois)
- College: Washington State (2020–2023)
- NFL draft: 2024: 5th round, 157th overall pick

Career history
- Carolina Panthers (2024–present)

Awards and highlights
- 2024 Senior Bowl MVP

Career NFL statistics as of Week 9, 2026
- Total tackles: 108
- Forced fumbles: 1
- Pass deflections: 5
- Interceptions: 2
- Touchdowns: 1
- Stats at Pro Football Reference

Chau Smith-Wade (pronounced "Shaw"; born September 17, 2002) is an American professional football cornerback for the Carolina Panthers of the National Football League (NFL). He played college football for the Washington State Cougars.

== Early life ==
Smith-Wade is from Denver, Colorado and attended high school at Simeon Career Academy in Chicago. Coming out of high school, Smith-Wade initially committed to play for the Wyoming Cowboys. However, Smith-Wade would de-commit and decide to flip his commitment to play college football for the Washington State Cougars.

== College career ==
In Smith-Wade's first collegiate season in 2020, he tallied eight tackles with one being for a loss, and a pass deflection, in just two games played. In the 2021 season, Smith-Wade made 16 tackles with five going for a loss, an interception, and three pass deflections. In 2022, Smith-Wade notched 43 tackles with two and a half being for a loss, eight pass deflections, two interceptions, a fumble recovery, and three forced fumbles. Smith-Wade finished the 2023 season with 36 tackles and six pass deflections while missing five games with an injury. After the conclusion of the 2023 season, Smith-Wade decided to declare for the 2024 NFL draft. Smith-Wade accepted an invite to play in the 2024 Senior Bowl.

== Professional career ==
Pre-draft measurables
Height	Weight	Arm length	Hand span	Wingspan	40-yard dash	10-yard split	20-yard split	20-yard shuttle	Three-cone drill	Vertical jump	Broad jump	Bench press
5 ft 9 3/4 in (1.77 m)	184 lb (83 kg)	30 1/4 in (0.77 m)	9 1/8 in (0.23 m)	6 ft 0 3/8 in (1.84 m)	4.54 s	1.55 s	2.61 s	4.32 s	7.05 s	34.5 in (0.88 m)	10 ft 5 in (3.18 m)	18 reps
All values from NFL Combine

Smith-Wade was selected by the Carolina Panthers in the fifth round with the 157th overall pick of the 2024 NFL draft. He played in 14 games with four starts as a rookie, recording 39 tackles, one forced fumble, a pass deflection, and an interception.

Smith-Wade entered the 2025 season as the Panthers starting nickelback. He played in 16 games with six starts, recording 56 tackles, two passes defensed, and one interception that he returned for an 11-yard touchdown.
