= Javontae Jean-Baptiste =

American football player (born 2000)

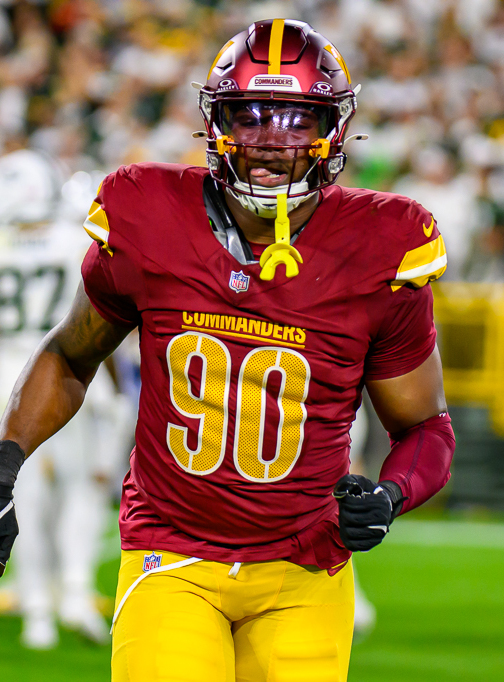
- Jean-Baptiste with the Washington Commanders in 2025

No. 41 – Washington Commanders
- Position: Outside linebacker
- Roster status: Injured reserve

Personal information
- Born: May 16, 2000 (age 26); Spring Valley, New York, U.S.
- Listed height: 6 ft 4 in (1.93 m)
- Listed weight: 260 lb (118 kg)

Career information
- High school: Bergen Catholic (Oradell, New Jersey)
- College: Ohio State (2018–2022); Notre Dame (2023)
- NFL draft: 2024: 7th round, 222nd overall pick

Career history
- Washington Commanders (2024–present)

Career NFL statistics as of 2025
- Total tackles: 19
- Sacks: 2
- Stats at Pro Football Reference

Javontae Jean-Baptiste (born May 16, 2000) is an American professional football outside linebacker for the Washington Commanders of the National Football League (NFL). He played college football for the Ohio State Buckeyes and Notre Dame Fighting Irish before being selected by the Commanders in the seventh round of the 2024 NFL draft.

== Early life ==
Jean-Baptiste was born on May 16, 2000, in Spring Valley, New York. He attended Bergen Catholic High School. As a senior, Jean-Baptiste notched 88 tackles with 14.5 being for a loss, 11.5 sacks, and two forced fumbles. Coming out of high school, he was rated as a four-star recruit and the 129th best player in the class of 2018. Jean-Baptiste committed to play college football for the Ohio State Buckeyes.

== College career ==
=== Ohio State ===
In Jean-Baptiste's first two seasons in 2019 and 2020, he played in 11 games notching 20 tackles with three and a half being for a loss, two and a half sacks, and a fumble recovery. He finished the 2021 season with 12 tackles with two going for a loss, and a sack and a half. In week 3 of the 2022 season, Jean-Baptiste totaled two sacks, a forced fumble, and five pressures against Toledo. In the 2022 Peach Bowl he had half a sack. In the 2022 season, Jean-Baptiste totaled 19 tackles with four and a half going for a loss, and four sacks. After the season, he entered the NCAA transfer portal. Jean-Baptiste finished his career at Ohio State totaling 52 tackles, eight sacks, and a forced fumble.

=== Notre Dame ===
In 2023, Jean-Baptiste transferred to the Notre Dame Fighting Irish. In Week 4, he notched a career-high eight tackles against his former team Ohio State. Jean-Baptiste tallied 47 tackles, 9.5 for loss, and 4 sacks during the season.

== Professional career ==
Pre-draft measurables
Height	Weight	Arm length	Hand span	Wingspan	40-yard dash	10-yard split	20-yard split	Vertical jump	Broad jump
6 ft 4 5/8 in (1.95 m)	239 lb (108 kg)	33 3/4 in (0.86 m)	10 in (0.25 m)	6 ft 8 1/2 in (2.04 m)	4.66 s	1.65 s	2.71 s	34.5 in (0.88 m)	10 ft 7 in (3.23 m)
All values from NFL Combine

Jean-Baptiste was selected by the Washington Commanders in the seventh round (222nd overall) of the 2024 NFL draft. He signed his four-year rookie contract on May 10, 2024. Jean-Baptiste recorded his first career sack in Week 3. He was placed on injured reserve on October 16, after suffering an ankle injury in Week 6. He was activated on November 23.

After suffering a torn pec in the Week 4 loss against the Atlanta Falcons, Jean-Baptiste was placed on injured reserve on October 1, 2025.

During the 2026 preseason, Jean-Baptiste switched from defensive end to outside linebacker in the new defensive scheme implemented by Daronte Jones. On October 19, 2026, the Commanders placed him on injured reserve for a third consecutive season.

== Career statistics ==
=== NFL ===
NFL statistics
Year	Team	Games		Tackles				Interceptions				Fumbles			
Year	Team	GP	GS	Cmb	Solo	Ast	Sck	Int	Yds	TD	PD	FF	FR	Yds	TD
2024	WAS	12	1	13	6	7	1.0	0	0	0	0	0	0	0	0
Career		12	1	13	6	7	1.0	0	0	0	0	0	0	0	0

=== College ===
College statistics
Year	Team	Games		Tackles				Interceptions				Fumbles		
Year	Team	GP	GS	Total	Solo	Ast	Sack	PD	Int	Yds	TD	FF	FR	TD
2018	Ohio State	Did not play												
2019	Ohio State	14	0	14	6	8	1.5	0	0	0	0	0	0	0
2020	Ohio State	6	2	6	3	3	1	0	0	0	0	0	1	0
2021	Ohio State	11	3	14	7	7	1.5	1	0	0	0	0	0	0
2022	Ohio State	11	0	19	9	10	4	0	0	0	0	1	0	0
2023	Notre Dame	13	12	49	21	28	5	1	0	0	0	1	1	0
Career		55	17	102	46	56	13	2	0	0	0	2	2	0

== Personal life ==
Jean-Baptiste's cousin, Abry Jones, played for the Jacksonville Jaguars from 2013 to 2020.
