= Holden Staes =

American football player (born 2003)

No. 19
- Position: Tight end

Personal information
- Born: June 10, 2003 (age 23)
- Listed height: 6 ft 4 in (1.93 m)
- Listed weight: 250 lb (113 kg)

Career information
- High school: Westminster (Atlanta, Georgia)
- College: Notre Dame (2022–2023); Tennessee (2024); Indiana (2025)

Awards and highlights
- CFP national champion (2025)
- Stats at ESPN

Noah Holden Staes (born June 10, 2003) is an American former college football tight end for the Notre Dame Fighting Irish, Tennessee Volunteers, and Indiana Hoosiers.

== Early life ==
Staes grew up in Atlanta, Georgia and attended The Westminster Schools. He was a three-time first-team all-region selection (2019–21) and was named a team captain as a senior. Over his career, he amassed 51 catches for 744 yards and seven touchdowns and made 53 tackles, including 13 tackles for loss. Staes earned 26 NCAA Division I football offers, including offers from Notre Dame, Alabama, Georgia, Ohio State, and Tennessee. He committed to Notre Dame on May 8, 2021.

College recruiting
Name	Hometown	School	Height	Weight	Commit date
Holden Staes; TE	Atlanta, Georgia	The Westminster School	6 ft 4 in (1.93 m)	230 lb (100 kg)	May 8, 2021
Holden Staes; TE	Recruit ratings: Rivals: 247Sports: ESPN: (81)				

== College career ==
=== Notre Dame ===
As a freshman at the University of Notre Dame in 2022, Staes played in 11 games, making his debut against Marshall on September 10, 2022. He made his lone start against North Carolina on September 24 and caught his first career pass on October 8 against BYU.

As a sophomore in 2023, Staes played in 11 games and made eight starts. He caught his first career touchdown on September 2, 2023 against Tennessee State. Staes logged a career-best 115 receiving yards on four catches, including 35 and 40 touchdown receptions, against NC State on September 9. On December 1, 2023, he entered the NCAA transfer portal.

=== Tennessee ===
On December 15, 2023, Staes transferred to Tennessee. In the 2024 season, he had 15 receptions for 131 yards and a touchdown.

=== Indiana ===
Staes transferred to Indiana for the 2025 season.

=== College statistics ===
Year	Team	Games		Receiving				
Year	Team	GP	GS	Rec	Yds	Avg	Lng	TD
2022	Notre Dame	11	1	1	11	11.0	11	0
2023	Notre Dame	11	8	15	176	11.7	40	4
2024	Tennessee	13	3	15	131	8.7	20	1
2025	Indiana	16	2	7	62	8.9	18	2
Career		51	14	38	380	10.0	40	7

== Personal life ==
Staes is the son of Michelle and Steven Staes and has two siblings, Ethan and Grace.
