= Cam Hart =

American football player (born 2000)

No. 20 – Los Angeles Chargers
- Position: Cornerback
- Roster status: Active

Personal information
- Born: December 5, 2000 (age 25); Baltimore, Maryland, U.S.
- Listed height: 6 ft 2 in (1.88 m)
- Listed weight: 207 lb (94 kg)

Career information
- High school: Good Counsel (Olney, Maryland)
- College: Notre Dame (2019–2023)
- NFL draft: 2024: 5th round, 140th overall pick

Career history
- Los Angeles Chargers (2024–present)

Career NFL statistics as of Week 5, 2026
- Total tackles: 106
- Sacks: 0.5
- Forced fumbles: 1
- Interceptions: 2
- Pass deflections: 23
- Stats at Pro Football Reference

Cameron Antonio Sterling Hart (born December 5, 2000) is an American professional football cornerback for the Los Angeles Chargers of the National Football League (NFL). He played college football for the Notre Dame Fighting Irish and was selected by the Chargers in the 5th round of the 2024 NFL draft.

== Early life ==
Hart was born on December 5, 2000, in Baltimore, Maryland. He attended Our Lady of Good Counsel High School in Olney, Maryland, where he played wide receiver. He committed to play college football as a cornerback at the University of Notre Dame.

== College career ==
As a true freshman for the Fighting Irish, Hart played in three games before suffering a season-ending shoulder injury. He made ten starts in each of his junior and senior seasons.

== Professional career ==
Pre-draft measurables
Height	Weight	Arm length	Hand span	Wingspan	40-yard dash	10-yard split	20-yard split	20-yard shuttle	Three-cone drill	Vertical jump	Broad jump	Bench press
6 ft 3 in (1.91 m)	202 lb (92 kg)	33 in (0.84 m)	9 3/8 in (0.24 m)	6 ft 6 7/8 in (2.00 m)	4.50 s	1.57 s	2.59 s	4.24 s	7.12 s	39.5 in (1.00 m)	10 ft 10 in (3.30 m)	11 reps
All values from NFL Combine

Hart was drafted by the Los Angeles Chargers in the fifth round (140th overall) of the 2024 NFL draft. He made 14 appearances (six starts) for Los Angeles during his rookie campaign, recording seven pass deflections, one forced fumble, 0.5 sacks, and 37 combined tackles. On May 27, 2025, Hart announced that he had undergone offseason shoulder surgery to repair a torn labrum suffered in the team's playoff loss to the Houston Texans.

On December 8, 2025 Hart recorded his first career interception, picking off a tipped Jalen Hurts pass in the 4th quarter of a Chargers 22-19 overtime win against the Philadelphia Eagles.

== Career statistics ==
=== NFL ===
==== Regular season ====
Year	Team	Games		Tackles					Interceptions						Fumbles			
Year	Team	GP	GS	Cmb	Solo	Ast	Sck	TFL	Int	Yds	Avg	Lng	TD	PD	FF	FR	Yds	TD
2024	LAC	14	6	37	28	9	0.5	0	0	0	0.0	0	0	7	1	0	0	0
2025	LAC	16	6	48	37	11	0.0	0	1	27	27.0	27	0	11	0	0	0	0
2026	LAC	5	3	21	13	8	0.0	0	1	2	2.0	2	0	5	0	0	0	0
Career		35	15	106	78	28	0.0	0	2	29	14.5	27	0	23	1	0	0	0

==== Playoffs ====
Year	Team	Games		Tackles					Interceptions						Fumbles			
Year	Team	GP	GS	Cmb	Solo	Ast	Sck	TFL	Int	Yds	Avg	Lng	TD	PD	FF	FR	Yds	TD
2024	LAC	1	1	0	0	0	0.0	0	0	0	0.0	0	0	1	0	0	0	0
2025	LAC	1	0	0	0	0	0.0	0	0	0	0.0	0	0	0	0	0	0	0
Career		2	1	0	0	0	0.0	0	0	0	0.0	0	0	1	0	0	0	0

=== College ===
College statistics
Year	Team	Games		Tackles				Interceptions				Fumbles		
Year	Team	GP	GS	Total	Solo	Ast	Sack	PD	Int	Yds	TD	FF	FR	TD
2019	Notre Dame	3	0	0	0	0	0.0	0	0	0	0	0	0	0
2020	Notre Dame	8	0	3	2	1	0.0	2	0	0	0	0	0	0
2021	Notre Dame	13	10	42	25	17	0.0	7	2	32	0	0	0	0
2022	Notre Dame	11	10	25	17	8	0.0	4	0	0	0	0	0	0
2023	Notre Dame	12	12	21	15	6	0.0	4	0	0	0	3	1	0
Career		47	32	91	59	32	0.0	17	2	32	0	3	1	0

== Personal life ==
Hart formerly appeared on Inside The Garage, a podcast series with Kyle Hamilton and other Notre Dame teammates focused on student athlete life at the school.
