= Zeke Correll =

American football player (born 2000)

Profile
- Position: Center

Personal information
- Born: November 10, 2000 (age 25); Cincinnati, Ohio, U.S.
- Listed height: 6 ft 3 in (1.91 m)
- Listed weight: 307 lb (139 kg)

Career information
- High school: Anderson (Cincinnati, Ohio)
- College: Notre Dame (2019–2023); NC State (2024)
- NFL draft: 2025: undrafted

Career history
- Minnesota Vikings (2025); Philadelphia Eagles (2026)*
- * Offseason or practice squad member only

Awards and highlights
- Third-team All-ACC (2024)
- Stats at Pro Football Reference

Ezekiel Stephen Correll (born November 10, 2000) is an American professional football center. He played college football for the Notre Dame Fighting Irish and NC State Wolfpack.

== Early life ==
Correll attended Anderson High School located in Cincinnati, Ohio. Coming out of high school, he was rated as a four-star recruit and committed to play college football for the Notre Dame Fighting Irish over offers from schools such as Alabama, Clemson, Ohio State, and Stanford.

== College career ==
=== Notre Dame ===
In his first three seasons from 2019 to 2021, Correll combined to play in 16 games with eight starts as a part-time starter on the Fighting Irish's offensive line. In 2022, he started all 13 games at center in 2022 before he made just ten starts in 2023 due to suffering a season-ending head injury late in the year. After the season, Correll entered his name into the NCAA transfer portal.

=== NC State ===
Correll transferred to play for the NC State Wolfpack. In his lone season with the Wolfpack in 2024, he started in all 13 games at center. For his performance during the season, he was named third team all-ACC.

== Professional career ==
Pre-draft measurables
Height	Weight	Arm length	Hand span	Wingspan	40-yard dash	10-yard split	20-yard split	20-yard shuttle	Three-cone drill	Vertical jump	Broad jump	Bench press
6 ft 2 3/4 in (1.90 m)	303 lb (137 kg)	31 1/8 in (0.79 m)	9 7/8 in (0.25 m)	6 ft 4 1/8 in (1.93 m)	5.51 s	1.78 s	3.10 s	4.64 s	8.28 s	29.0 in (0.74 m)	8 ft 11 in (2.72 m)	24 reps
All values from Pro Day

=== Minnesota Vikings ===
After not being selected in the 2025 NFL draft, Correll signed with the Minnesota Vikings as an undrafted free agent. He was waived on August 12, 2025, with an injury designation and reverted to injured reserve the following day.

On March 13, 2026, Correll was waived by the Vikings.

=== Philadelphia Eagles ===
On August 21, 2026, the Philadelphia Eagles signed Correll to their active roster. He was waived by the Eagles as a part of final roster cuts on August 30.

== Personal life ==
Correll is the youngest of nine siblings.
