= JD Bertrand =

American football player (born 2000)

No. 40 – Atlanta Falcons
- Position: Linebacker
- Roster status: Injured reserve

Personal information
- Born: May 5, 2000 (age 26); Alpharetta, Georgia, U.S.
- Listed height: 6 ft 1 in (1.85 m)
- Listed weight: 230 lb (104 kg)

Career information
- High school: Blessed Trinity (Roswell, Georgia)
- College: Notre Dame (2019–2023)
- NFL draft: 2024: 5th round, 143rd overall pick

Career history
- Atlanta Falcons (2024–present)

Career NFL statistics as of 2025
- Total tackles: 58
- Sacks: 1
- Pass deflections: 2
- Stats at Pro Football Reference

James David Bertrand (born May 5, 2000) is an American professional football linebacker for the Atlanta Falcons of the National Football League (NFL). He played college football for the Notre Dame Fighting Irish.

== Early life ==
Bertrand attended Blessed Trinity Catholic High School in Roswell, Georgia, winning back-to-back Georgia Class AAAA State Championships in 2017 and 2018. He committed to play college football at the University of Georgia before changing his commitment to the University of Notre Dame.

== College career ==
As a true freshman, Bertrand played exclusively on special teams in four games. In his junior season, he started in all 13 games and recorded 101 tackles, leading the Irish defense. He was named a team captain for the 2022 season and finished the year with a team-leading 82 tackles.

== Professional career ==
Pre-draft measurables
Height	Weight	Arm length	Hand span	Wingspan	Bench press
6 ft 0 7/8 in (1.85 m)	235 lb (107 kg)	30 5/8 in (0.78 m)	9 3/4 in (0.25 m)	6 ft 2 7/8 in (1.90 m)	20 reps
All values from NFL Combine

The Atlanta Falcons selected Bertrand in the fifth round of the 2024 NFL draft with the 143rd overall pick.

On August 31, 2026, Bertrand was placed on injured reserve due to an undisclosed injury.

== Career statistics ==
Legend
**Bold**	Career high

=== NFL ===
Year	Team	Games		Tackles					Interceptions						Fumbles		
Year	Team	GP	GS	Total	Solo	Ast	Sck	Sfty	PD	Int	Yds	Avg	Lng	TD	FF	FR	TD
2024	ATL	12	0	23	**16**	7	**1.0**	0	0	0	0	0.0	0	0	0	0	0
2025	ATL	15	2	**35**	13	**22**	0	0	**2**	0	0	0.0	0	0	0	0	0
Career		27	2	58	29	29	1.0	0	2	0	0	0.0	0	0	0	0	0

=== College ===
Year	Team	Games		Tackles				Interceptions				Fumbles		
Year	Team	GP	GS	Total	Solo	Ast	Sack	PD	Int	Yds	TD	FF	FR	TD
2019	Notre Dame	3	0	0	0	0	0.0	0	0	0	0	0	0	0
2020	Notre Dame	10	0	7	5	2	0.0	0	0	0	0	0	0	0
2021	Notre Dame	13	13	**101**	**63**	**38**	1.5	1	0	0	0	**1**	**1**	0
2022	Notre Dame	12	10	82	45	37	2.0	3	0	0	0	0	0	0
2023	Notre Dame	12	12	76	41	35	**2.5**	**5**	0	0	0	**1**	0	0
Career		50	35	266	154	112	6.0	9	0	0	0	2	1	0

== Personal life ==
Bertrand has two older brothers, Chris and John Michael, the latter of whom plays baseball in the San Francisco Giants organization. Their great-grandfather, Cecil Muellerleile, played football, coached, and served as the athletic director at Saint Louis University.
