= 2024 Notre Dame Fighting Irish football team =

American college football season

2024 Notre Dame Fighting Irish football

Sugar Bowl champion Orange Bowl champion

CFP First Round, W 27–17 vs. Indiana; Sugar Bowl (CFP Quarterfinal), W 23–10 vs. Georgia; Orange Bowl (CFP Semifinal), W 27–24 vs. Penn State; CFP National Championship, L 23–34 vs. Ohio State
- Conference: Independent

Ranking
- Coaches: No. 2
- AP: No. 2
- Record: 14–2
- Head coach: Marcus Freeman (3rd season)
- Offensive coordinator: Mike Denbrock (1st in current stint, 2nd overall season)
- Offensive scheme: Multiple
- Defensive coordinator: Al Golden (3rd season)
- Base defense: 4–3
- MVP: Riley Leonard
- Captains: Jack Kiser; Riley Leonard; Rylie Mills; Benjamin Morrison; Xavier Watts
- Home stadium: Notre Dame Stadium

Uniform
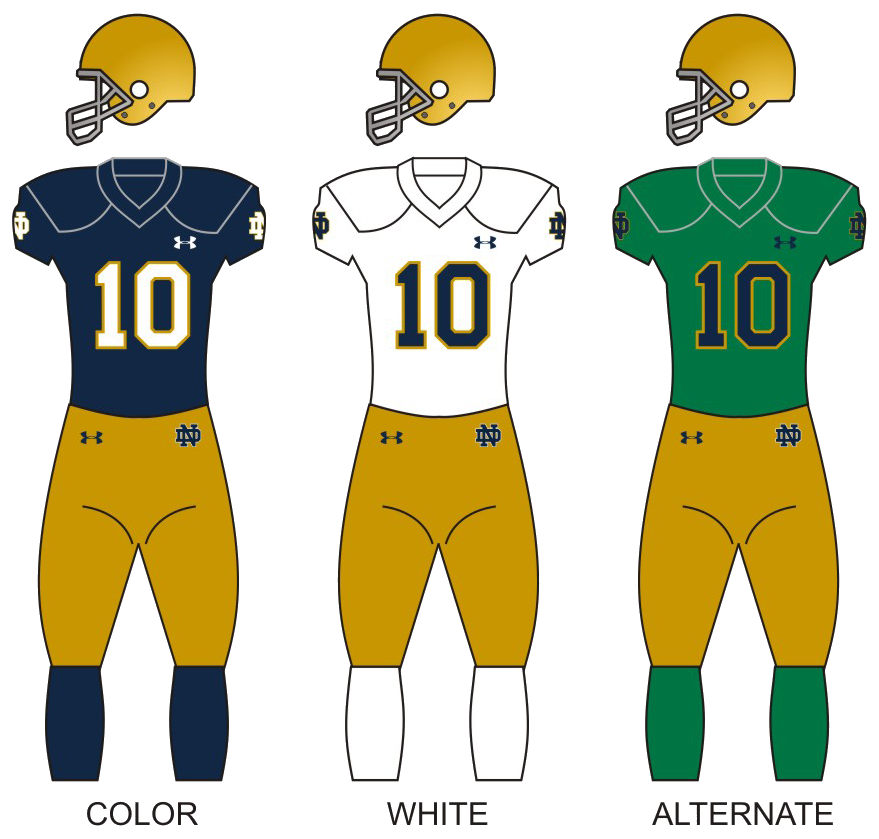

2024 NCAA Division I FBS independents football records
	Conf.			Overall
Team	W		L	W		L
No. 2 Notre Dame ^		–		14	–	2
UConn		–		9	–	4
UMass		–		2	–	10
^ – College Football Playoff participant; Rankings from AP Poll

The 2024 Notre Dame Fighting Irish football team was an American football team that represented the University of Notre Dame as an independent during the 2024 NCAA Division I FBS football season. In their third year under head coach Marcus Freeman, the team compiled a 14–2 record, outscored opponents by a total of 578 to 248, and were ranked No. 2 in the final AP and Coaches Polls, which was the highest finish for the Irish since 1993. The Irish lost in week 2 to Northern Illinois and proceeded to win their next 13 games, including regular-season wins over No 15 Louisville, No. 24 Navy, and No. 18 Army. They advanced to the College Football Playoff where they defeated No. 9 Indiana Hoosiers in the first round, No. 2 Georgia in the Sugar Bowl (CFP Quarterfinal), and No. 4 Penn State in the Orange Bowl (CFP Semifinal), and lost to No. 6 Ohio State in the national championship game. The Irish won a school-record seven games against teams that were ranked in the AP poll.

Quarterback Riley Leonard passed for 2,861 passing yards and 21 touchdowns, rushed for 906 yards and 17 touchdowns, and was selected as the team's most valuable player. The team's other statistical leaders included running back Jeremiyah Love (1,125 yards, 116 point scored), wide receiver Jaden Greathouse (592 receiving yards), and linebacker Jack Kiser (90 total tackles). In addition, safety Xavier Watts tallied 82 total tackles and six interceptions and was a consensus first-team pick on the 2024 All-America college football team.

The team played its home games at Notre Dame Stadium in Notre Dame, Indiana.

== Offseason ==
=== Coaching changes ===
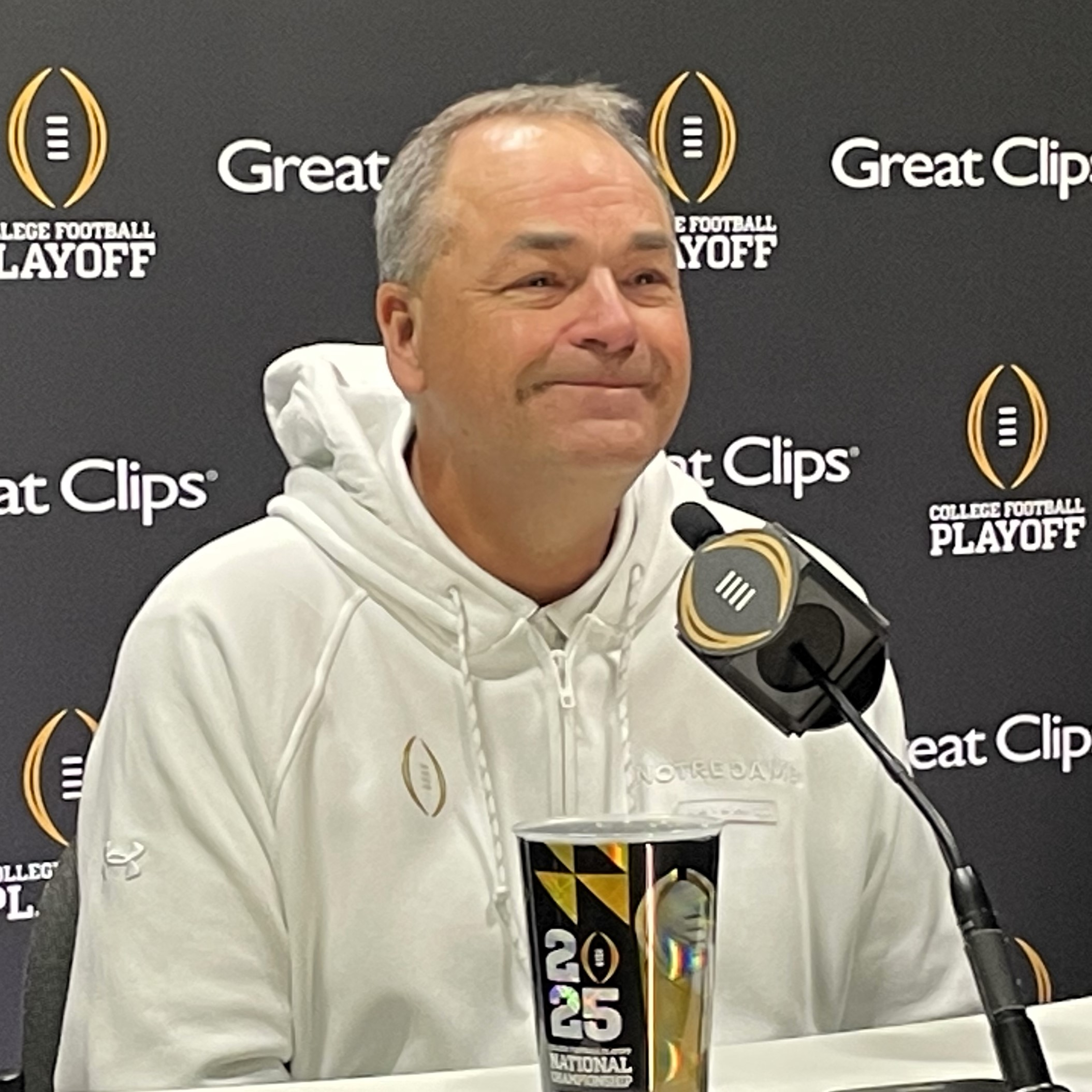
Mike Denbrock was hired as the new offensive coordinator before the season.

The following coaches left the program:

- Offensive coordinator and tight ends coach Gerad Parker left for the head coach position with Troy.
- Defensive backs and safeties coach Chris O'Leary left for the safeties coach position with the Los Angeles Chargers of the NFL.
- Wide receivers coach Chansi Stuckey was not retained.

The following coaches were hired:

- Mike Denbrock was hired from LSU to be the offensive coordinator and tight ends coach.
- Mike Brown was hired from Wisconsin to be the wide receivers coach.
- Loren Landow was hired to be the director of football performance. The position has been vacant since Matt Balis resigned prior to the 2023 season.

The following coaches were promoted:

- Special teams coordinator Marty Biagi was promoted to special teams coordinator and assistant defensive backs coach.
- Running backs coach and run game coordinator Deland McCullough was promoted to associate head coach and running backs coach.
- Graduate assistant Max Bullough was promoted to linebackers coach.
- Cornerbacks coach and defensive pass game coordinator Mike Mickens was promoted to defensive backs coach and defensive pass game coordinator.

The following coaches were demoted:

- Defensive coordinator and linebackers coach Al Golden was demoted to defensive coordinator.

=== Departures ===
==== NFL ====
Player	Position	Team	Round	Pick	Notes
Joe Alt	OL	Los Angeles Chargers	1	5	Forewent 1 year of remaining eligibility
Blake Fisher	OL	Houston Texans	2	59	Forewent 2 years of remaining eligibility
Marist Liufau	LB	Dallas Cowboys	3	87	Forewent 1 year of remaining eligibility
Cam Hart	CB	Los Angeles Chargers	5	140	Forewent 1 year of remaining eligibility
JD Bertrand	LB	Atlanta Falcons	5	143	Forewent 1 year of remaining eligibility
Audric Estimé	RB	Denver Broncos	5	147	Forewent 1 year of remaining eligibility
Javontae Jean-Baptiste	DL	Washington Commanders	7	222	
Thomas Harper	S	Los Angeles Chargers	Undrafted free agent		
Sam Hartman	QB	Washington Commanders	Undrafted free agent		
Spencer Shrader	K	Indianapolis Colts	Undrafted free agent		
Michael Vinson	LS	Indianapolis Colts	Rookie minicamp invite		

==== UFL ====
Player	Position	Team	Round	Pick
Sam Hartman	QB	Birmingham Stallions	9	72

==== Transfers out ====
- CB Ryan Barnes transferred to UMass.
- CB Micah Bell transferred to Vanderbilt.
- OL Michael Carmody transferred to UCLA.
- S Antonio Carter II transferred to Jacksonville State.
- OL Zeke Correll transferred to NC State.
- WR Rico Flores Jr. transferred to UCLA.
- S Ramon Henderson transferred to UCLA.
- WR Braylon James transferred to TCU.
- DL Aidan Keanaaina transferred to California.
- CB Clarence Lewis transferred to Syracuse.
- P Bryce McFerson transferred to Maryland.
- WR Tobias Merriweather transferred to California.
- OL Quinn Murphy transferred to Western Michigan; previously walk-on.
- DL NaNa Osafo-Mensah transferred to TCU.
- TE Holden Staes transferred to Tennessee.
- OL Joey Tanona transferred to Purdue; previously medically retired.
- WR Chris Tyree transferred to Virginia.
- RB Skip Velotta transferred to LSU; previously walk-on.
- LB Nolan Ziegler transferred to Central Michigan.

==== Retirements ====
- RB Sam Assaf
- DL Cole Aubrey
- S DJ Brown
- WR Henry Cook
- WR Chase Dixon
- P Bryan Dowd
- WR Griffin Eifert
- DL Tyson Ford (medically retired)
- DL Aiden Gobaira (medically retired)
- RB Chase Ketterer
- P Ben Krimm
- OL Andrew Kristofic
- WR Matt Salerno
- TE Hakim Sanfo
- S Eddie Scheidler
- OL Brennan Wicks

=== Additions ===
==== Transfers in ====
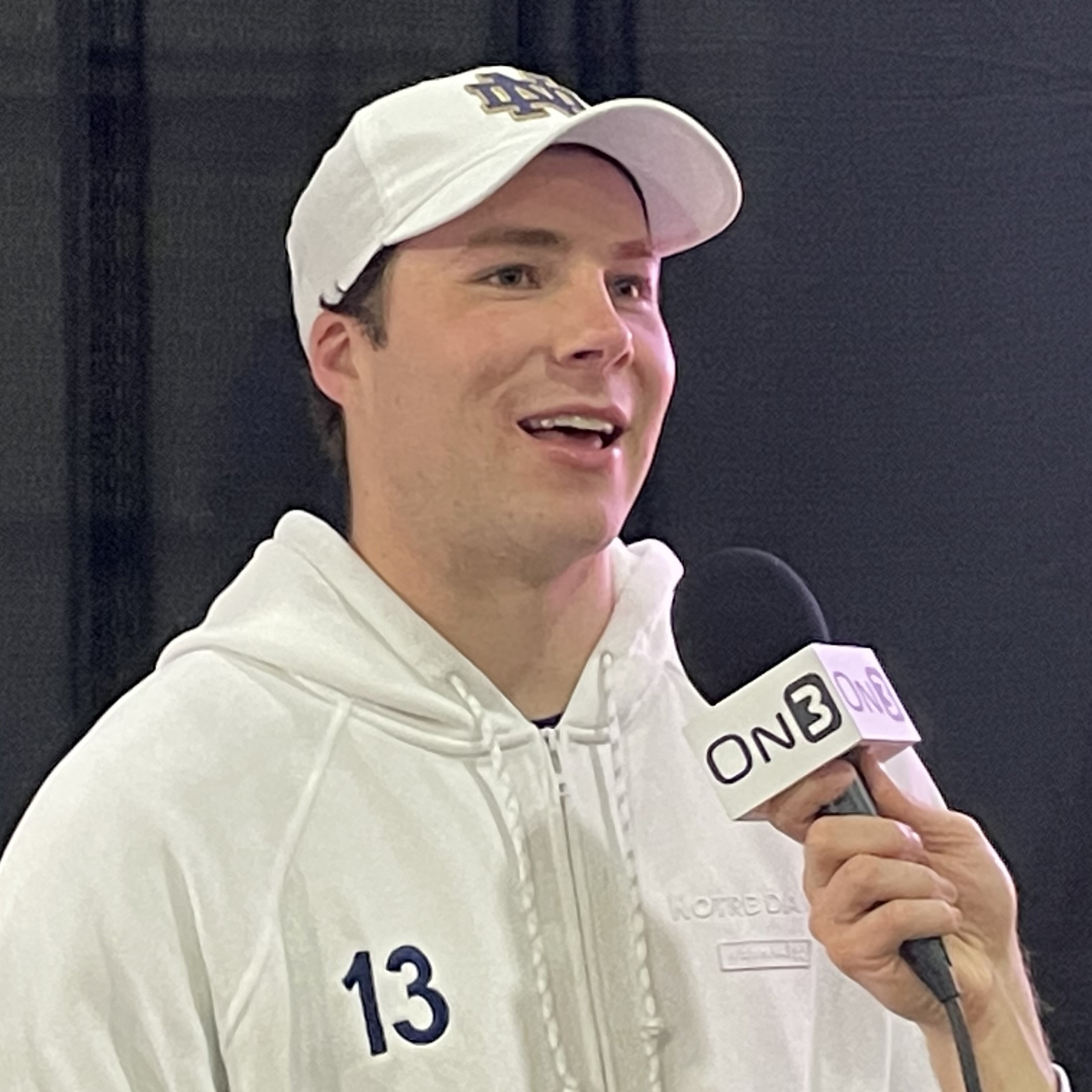
Quarterback Riley Leonard transferred in from Duke.

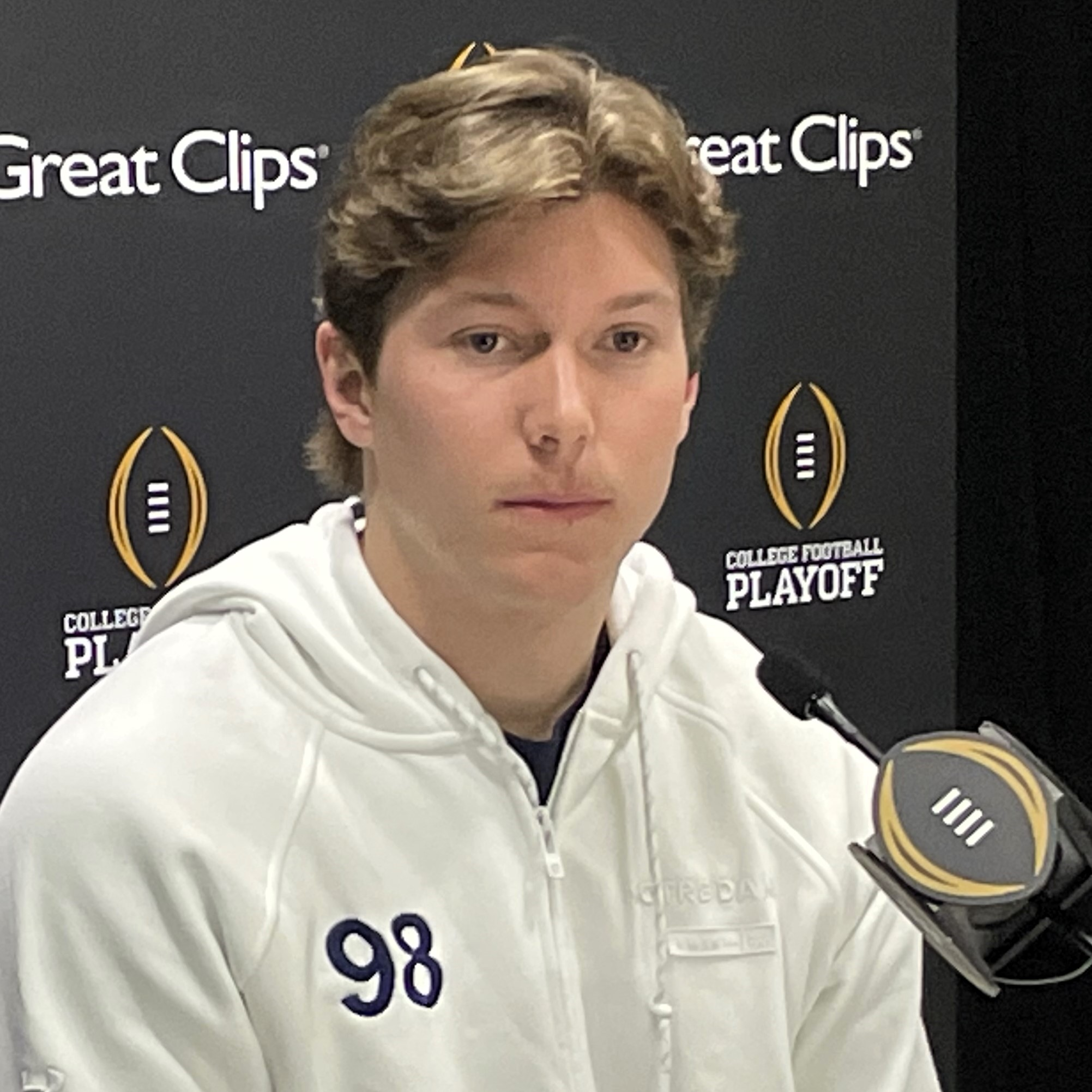
Placekicker Mitch Jeter transferred in from South Carolina

- S Jordan Clark transferred in from Arizona State.
- WR Beaux Collins transferred in from Clemson.
- WR Jayden Harrison transferred in from Marshall.
- S Rod Heard II transferred in from Northwestern.
- K Mitch Jeter transferred in from South Carolina.
- QB Riley Leonard transferred in from Duke.
- WR Kris Mitchell transferred in from FIU.
- DL RJ Oben transferred in from Duke.
- P James Rendell transferred in from RMIT.

==== Walk-on transfers in ====
- DL Quentin Autry transferred in from Columbia.
- P William Bartel transferred in from Villanova.
- WR Tyler Buchner transferred in from Alabama.
- P/K Eric Goins transferred in from The Citadel.
- CB Max Hurleman transferred in from Colgate.
- RB Jake Tafelski transferred in from Central Michigan.

==== Recruiting ====
College recruiting (2024)
Name	Hometown	School	Height	Weight	Commit date
Taebron Bennie-Powell; S	Cincinnati, OH	Lakota West	6 ft 1 in (1.85 m)	177 lb (80 kg)	
Taebron Bennie-Powell; S	Recruit ratings: Rivals: 247Sports: ESPN: (77)				
CJ Carr; QB	Saline, MI	Saline	6 ft 3 in (1.91 m)	210 lb (95 kg)	
CJ Carr; QB	Recruit ratings: Rivals: 247Sports: ESPN: (86)				
Micah Gilbert; WR	Charlotte, NC	Charlotte Christian	6 ft 2 in (1.88 m)	208 lb (94 kg)	
Micah Gilbert; WR	Recruit ratings: Rivals: 247Sports: ESPN: (81)				
Karson Hobbs; CB	Cincinnati, OH	Archbishop Moeller	6 ft 1 in (1.85 m)	184 lb (83 kg)	
Karson Hobbs; CB	Recruit ratings: Rivals: 247Sports: ESPN: (78)				
Tae Johnson; S	Fort Wayne, IN	North Side	6 ft 2 in (1.88 m)	175 lb (79 kg)	
Tae Johnson; S	Recruit ratings: Rivals: 247Sports: ESPN: (81)				
Peter Jones; OL	Coatesville, PA	Malvern Prep	6 ft 5 in (1.96 m)	310 lb (140 kg)	
Peter Jones; OL	Recruit ratings: Rivals: 247Sports: ESPN: (80)				
Bodie Kahoun; LB	Roanoke, VA	Patrick Henry	6 ft 3 in (1.91 m)	221 lb (100 kg)	
Bodie Kahoun; LB	Recruit ratings: Rivals: 247Sports: ESPN: (78)				
Anthonie Knapp; OL	Roswell, GA	Roswell	6 ft 4 in (1.93 m)	291 lb (132 kg)	
Anthonie Knapp; OL	Recruit ratings: Rivals: 247Sports: ESPN: (78)				
Guerby Lambert; OL	Boston, MA	Catholic Memorial	6 ft 7 in (2.01 m)	318 lb (144 kg)	
Guerby Lambert; OL	Recruit ratings: Rivals: 247Sports: ESPN: (85)				
Jack Larsen; TE	Charlotte, NC	Charlotte Catholic	6 ft 3 in (1.91 m)	246 lb (112 kg)	
Jack Larsen; TE	Recruit ratings: Rivals: 247Sports: ESPN: (80)				
Leonard Moore; CB	Round Rock, TX	Round Rock	6 ft 1 in (1.85 m)	187 lb (85 kg)	
Leonard Moore; CB	Recruit ratings: Rivals: 247Sports: ESPN: (78)				
Cole Mullins; DL	Hoschton, GA	Mill Creek	6 ft 4 in (1.93 m)	259 lb (117 kg)	
Cole Mullins; DL	Recruit ratings: Rivals: 247Sports: ESPN: (78)				
Styles Prescod; OL	Fishers, IN	Hamilton Southeastern	6 ft 6 in (1.98 m)	293 lb (133 kg)	
Styles Prescod; OL	Recruit ratings: Rivals: 247Sports: ESPN: (80)				
Teddy Rezac; LB	Omaha, NE	Westside	6 ft 3 in (1.91 m)	199 lb (90 kg)	
Teddy Rezac; LB	Recruit ratings: Rivals: 247Sports: ESPN: (77)				
Logan Saldate; WR	Gilroy, CA	Palma	5 ft 11 in (1.80 m)	187 lb (85 kg)	
Logan Saldate; WR	Recruit ratings: Rivals: 247Sports: ESPN: (77)				
Sean Sevillano Jr. DL	Clearwater, FL	Clearwater Academy International	6 ft 1 in (1.85 m)	320 lb (150 kg)	
Sean Sevillano Jr. DL	Recruit ratings: Rivals: 247Sports: ESPN: (78)				
Loghan Thomas; DL	Katy, TX	St. Edward (Ohio)	6 ft 4 in (1.93 m)	224 lb (102 kg)	
Loghan Thomas; DL	Recruit ratings: Rivals: 247Sports: ESPN: (81)				
Kennedy Urlacher; S	Chandler, AZ	Chandler High	5 ft 11 in (1.80 m)	196 lb (89 kg)	
Kennedy Urlacher; S	Recruit ratings: Rivals: 247Sports: ESPN: (76)				
Kyngstonn Viliamu-Asa; LB	Inland Empire, CA	St. John Bosco	6 ft 3 in (1.91 m)	240 lb (110 kg)	
Kyngstonn Viliamu-Asa; LB	Recruit ratings: Rivals: 247Sports: ESPN: (84)				
Aneyas Williams; RB	Hannibal, MO	Hannibal	5 ft 10 in (1.78 m)	200 lb (91 kg)	
Aneyas Williams; RB	Recruit ratings: Rivals: 247Sports: ESPN: (80)				
Cam Williams; WR	Glen Ellyn, IL	Glenbard South	6 ft 2 in (1.88 m)	199 lb (90 kg)	
Cam Williams; WR	Recruit ratings: Rivals: 247Sports: ESPN: (86)				
Bryce Young; DL	Charlotte, NC	Charlotte Christian	6 ft 7 in (2.01 m)	258 lb (117 kg)	
Bryce Young; DL	Recruit ratings: Rivals: 247Sports: ESPN: (82)				
Kedren Young; RB	Lufkin, TX	Lufkin	6 ft 0 in (1.83 m)	229 lb (104 kg)	
Kedren Young; RB	Recruit ratings: Rivals: 247Sports: ESPN: (82)				
Overall recruit ranking: Rivals: 9 247Sports: 8
Note: In many cases, Scout, Rivals, 247Sports, On3, and ESPN may conflict in their listings of height and weight.; In these cases, the average was taken. ESPN grades are on a 100-point scale.; Sources: "Rivals commits". Rivals.; "ESPN commits". ESPN.; "2024 Team Ranking". Rivals.com.; "247Sports commits". 247Sports.

==== New walk-ons ====
- OL Max Anderson
- CB Mickey Brown
- CB Charles Du
- WR Matt Jeffery (on lacrosse scholarship)
- LB Tommy Powlus
- QB Anthony Rezac
- WR Xavier Southall
- LS Joseph Vinci
- OL Robbie Wollan

==== Other ====
- LB Kahanu Kia returned from Mormon missionary.

=== Changes ===
- Marty Auer switched positions from S to CB.
- Dylan Devezin switched positions from QB to RB.
- Justin Fisher switched positions from TE to RB.
- Kahanu Kia switched positions from DL to LB.
- Chris Salerno switched positions from P to K.
- S Luke Talich earned scholarship on March 7; previously walk-on.

== Schedule ==
Date	Time	Opponent	Rank	Site	TV	Result	Attendance
August 31	7:30 p.m.	at No. 20 Texas A&M	No. 7	Kyle Field; College Station, TX (College GameDay)	ABC	W 23–13	107,315
September 7	3:30 p.m.	Northern Illinois	No. 5	Notre Dame Stadium; Notre Dame, IN	NBC	L 14–16	77,622
September 14	3:30 p.m.	at Purdue	No. 18	Ross–Ade Stadium; West Lafayette, IN (rivalry)	CBS	W 66–7	61,441
September 21	3:30 p.m.	Miami (OH)	No. 17	Notre Dame Stadium; Notre Dame, IN	NBC	W 28–3	77,622
September 28	3:30 p.m.	No. 15 Louisville	No. 16	Notre Dame Stadium; Notre Dame, IN	Peacock	W 31–24	77,622
October 12	3:30 p.m.	Stanford	No. T–11	Notre Dame Stadium; Notre Dame, IN (rivalry)	NBC/CNBC (Note: Game was moved to CNBC due to overrun into Big Ten Saturday Night after it was delayed due to lightning in the area.)	W 49–7	77,622
October 19	3:30 p.m.	vs. Georgia Tech	No. 12	Mercedes-Benz Stadium; Atlanta, GA (rivalry)	ESPN	W 31–13	59,021
October 26	12:00 p.m.	vs. No. 24 Navy	No. 12	MetLife Stadium; East Rutherford, NJ (rivalry)	ABC	W 51–14	76,112
November 9	7:30 p.m.	Florida State	No. 10	Notre Dame Stadium; Notre Dame, IN (rivalry)	NBC	W 52–3	77,622
November 16	3:30 p.m.	Virginia	No. 8	Notre Dame Stadium; Notre Dame, IN	NBC	W 35–14	77,622
November 23	7:00 p.m.	vs. No. 19 Army	No. 6	Yankee Stadium; Bronx, NY (Shamrock Series, rivalry)	NBC	W 49–14	47,342
November 30	3:30 p.m.	at USC	No. 5	Los Angeles Memorial Coliseum; Los Angeles, CA (rivalry)	CBS	W 49–35	73,241
December 20	8:00 p.m.	(10) No. 8 Indiana	(7) No. 5	Notre Dame Stadium; Notre Dame, IN (CFP First Round, College GameDay)	ESPN/ABC	W 27–17	77,622
January 2, 2025 (Note: The Sugar Bowl was originally scheduled for January 1, but was postponed a day later due to the terrorist attack that took place early that morning in the nearby French Quarter.)	4:00 p.m.	vs. (2) No. 2 Georgia	(7) No. 5	Caesars Superdome; New Orleans, LA (Sugar Bowl–CFP Quarterfinal)	ESPN	W 23–10	57,267
January 9, 2025	7:30 p.m.	vs. (6) No. 4 Penn State	(7) No. 5	Hard Rock Stadium; Miami, FL (Orange Bowl–CFP Semifinal, rivalry, College GameDay)	ESPN	W 27–24	66,881
January 20, 2025	7:30 p.m.	vs. (8) No. 6 Ohio State	(7) No. 5	Mercedes-Benz Stadium; Atlanta, GA (CFP National Championship)	ESPN	L 23–34	77,660
Rankings from AP Poll (and CFP Rankings, after November 5) - Released prior to game; All times are in Eastern time; Source:

== Rankings ==
Ranking movements Legend: ██ Increase in ranking ██ Decrease in ranking т = Tied with team above or below
	Week																
Poll	Pre	1	2	3	4	5	6	7	8	9	10	11	12	13	14	15	Final
AP	7	5	18	17	16	14	11т	12	12	8	10	8	6	5	4	3	2
Coaches	7	7	19	18	14	13	12	11	11	9	8	7	6	5	4	3	2
CFP	Not released										10	8	6	5	4	5	Not released

== Game summaries ==
=== at No. 20 Texas A&M ===
No. 7 Notre Dame Fighting Irish (0–0) at No. 20 Texas A&M Aggies (0–0) – Game summary

Quarter	1	2	3	4	Total
No. 7 Fighting Irish	3	3	7	10	23
No. 20 Aggies	3	3	0	7	13

at Kyle Field, College Station, Texas

- Date: August 31, 2024
- Game time: 7:30 p.m. EST
- Game weather: Temperature: 90 °F (32 °C) • Wind: NE 18 MPH • Weather: Sunny
- Game attendance: 107,315
- Referee: Adam Savoie
- TV announcers (ABC): Chris Fowler (play-by-play), Kirk Herbstreit (analyst), and Holly Rowe (sideline reporter)
- Box score, Recap

Game information

First quarter

- (11:07) TAMU – Randy Bond 34-yard field goal (Drive: 10 plays, 58 yards, 3:53; Texas A&M 3–0)
- (6:39) ND – Mitch Jeter 46-yard field goal (Drive: 9 plays, 47 yards, 4:28; Tied 3–3)

Second quarter

- (14:14) TAMU – Randy Bond 49-yard field goal (Drive: 8 plays, 31 yards, 3:45; Texas A&M 6–3)
- (8:32) ND – Mitch Jeter 26-yard field goal (Drive: 7 plays, 21 yards, 2:35; Tied 6–6)

Third quarter

- (6:50) ND – Jadarian Price 47-yard run, Mitch Jeter kick (Drive: 4 plays, 63 yards, 2:05; Notre Dame 13–6)

Fourth quarter

- (11:49) TAMU – Le'Veon Moss 1-yard run, Randy Bond kick (Drive: 10 plays, 65 yards, 3:43; Tied 13–13)
- (1:54) ND – Jeremiyah Love 21-yard run, Mitch Jeter kick (Drive: 8 plays, 85 yards, 4:29; Notre Dame 20–13)
- (0:30) ND – Mitch Jeter 46-yard field goal (Drive: 4 plays, 5 yards, 1:04; Notre Dame 23–13)

Statistics	ND	TAMU
First downs	18	17
Total yards	356	246
Rushes/yards	34–198	38–146
Passing yards	158	100
Passing: Comp–Att–Int	18–30–0	12–30–2
Time of possession	31:35	28:25

Team	Category	Player	Statistics
Notre Dame	Passing	Riley Leonard	18/30, 158 yards
Notre Dame	Rushing	Jeremiyah Love	14 carries, 91 yards
Notre Dame	Receiving	Beaux Collins	5 receptions, 62 yards
Texas A&M	Passing	Conner Weigman	12/30, 100 yards, 2 INT
Texas A&M	Rushing	Le'Veon Moss	20 carries, 70 yards, TD
Texas A&M	Receiving	Jahdae Walker	6 receptions, 31 yards

=== Northern Illinois ===
Northern Illinois Huskies (1–0) vs. No. 5 Notre Dame Fighting Irish (1–0) – Game summary

Quarter	1	2	3	4	Total
Huskies	10	3	0	3	16
No. 5 Fighting Irish	7	0	7	0	14

at Notre Dame Stadium, South Bend, Indiana

- Date: September 7, 2024
- Game time: 3:30 p.m. EST
- Game weather: Temperature: 63 °F (17 °C) • Wind: NE 16 MPH • Weather: Sunny
- Game attendance: 77,622
- Referee: Tim Hedgepeth
- TV announcers (NBC): Dan Hicks (play-by-play), Jason Garrett (analyst), and Zora Stephenson (sideline reporter)
- Box score, Recap

Game information

First quarter

- (8:28) ND – Riley Leonard 11-yard run, Mitch Jeter kick (Drive: 13 plays, 75 yards, 6:25; Notre Dame 7–0)
- (5:35) NIU – Antario Brown 83-yard pass from Ethan Hampton, Kanon Woodill kick (Drive: 5 plays, 98 yards, 2:51; Tied 7–7)
- (2:13) NIU – Kanon Woodill 42-yard field goal (Drive: 5 plays, 30 yards, 1:28; Northern Illinois 10–7)

Second quarter

- (13:39) NIU – Kanon Woodill 21-yard field goal (Drive: 5 plays, 51 yards, 2:08; Northern Illinois 13–7)

Third quarter

- (8:34) ND – Jeremiyah Love 34-yard run, Mitch Jeter kick (Drive: 6 plays, 64 yards, 2:43; Notre Dame 14–13)

Fourth quarter

- (0:31) NIU – Kanon Woodill 35-yard field goal (Drive: 11 plays, 31 yards, 5:24; Northern Illinois 16–14)

Statistics	NIU	ND
First downs	16	17
Total yards	388	286
Rushes/yards	45–190	28–123
Passing yards	198	163
Passing: Comp–Att–Int	10–20–0	20–33–2
Time of possession	34:38	25:22

Team	Category	Player	Statistics
Northern Illinois	Passing	Ethan Hampton	10/19, 198 yards, TD
Northern Illinois	Rushing	Antario Brown	20 carries, 99 yards
Northern Illinois	Receiving	Antario Brown	2 receptions, 126 yards, TD
Notre Dame	Passing	Riley Leonard	20/32, 163 yards, 2 INT
Notre Dame	Rushing	Jeremiyah Love	11 carries, 79 yards, TD
Notre Dame	Receiving	Beaux Collins	5 receptions, 45 yards

=== at Purdue (rivalry) ===
No. 18 Notre Dame Fighting Irish (1–1) at Purdue Boilermakers (1–0) – Game summary

Quarter	1	2	3	4	Total
No. 18 Fighting Irish	14	28	10	14	66
Boilermakers	0	0	7	0	7

at Ross-Ade Stadium, West Lafayette, Indiana

- Date: September 14, 2024
- Game time: 3:30 p.m. EST
- Game weather: Temperature: 89 °F (32 °C) • Wind: E 10 MPH • Weather: Sunny
- Game attendance: 61,441
- Referee: Jerry Magallanes
- TV announcers (CBS): Brad Nessler (play-by-play), Gary Danielson (analyst), and Jenny Dell (sideline reporter)
- Box score, Recap

Game information

First quarter

- (12:50) ND – Jeremiyah Love 48-yard run, Mitch Jeter kick (Drive: 5 plays, 75 yards, 2:10; Notre Dame 7–0)
- (1:53) ND – Riley Leonard 3-yard run, Mitch Jeter kick (Drive: 11 plays, 82 yards, 5:43; Notre Dame 14–0)

Second quarter

- (8:24) ND – Riley Leonard 34-yard run, Mitch Jeter kick (Drive: 7 plays, 68 yards, 3:16; Notre Dame 21–0)
- (2:10) ND – Riley Leonard 13-yard run, Mitch Jeter kick (Drive: 10 plays, 77 yards, 4:54; Notre Dame 28–0)
- (1:32) ND – Boubacar Traore 34-yard interception return, Mitch Jeter kick (Drive: 0:38; Notre Dame 35–0)
- (0:04) ND – Jadarian Price 70-yard run, Mitch Jeter kick (Drive: 1 play, 60 yards, 0:37; Notre Dame 42–0)

Third quarter

- (12:41) ND – Cooper Flanagan 28-yard pass from Steve Angeli, Mitch Jeter kick (Drive: 2 plays, 32 yards, 0:40; Notre Dame 49–0)
- (9:33) PUR – De'Nylon Morrissette 5-yard pass from Hudson Card, Spencer Porath kick (Drive: 6 plays, 75 yards, 3:08; Notre Dame 49–7)
- (5:39) ND – Mitch Jeter 42-yard field goal (Drive: 7 plays, 51 yards, 3:54; Notre Dame 52–7)

Fourth quarter

- (14:52) ND – Kevin Bauman 8-yard pass from Steve Angeli, Zac Yoakam kick (Drive: 7 plays, 52 yards, 3:43; Notre Dame 59–7)
- (5:44) ND – Kenny Minchey 5-yard run, Zac Yoakam kick (Drive: 3 plays, 31 yards, 1:31; Notre Dame 66–7)

Statistics	ND	PUR
First downs	27	6
Total yards	578	162
Rushes/yards	44–362	25–38
Passing yards	216	124
Passing: Comp–Att–Int	18–26–0	11–24–2
Time of possession	35:43	24:17

Team	Category	Player	Statistics
Notre Dame	Passing	Riley Leonard	11/16, 112 yards
Notre Dame	Rushing	Jeremiyah Love	10 carries, 109 yards, TD
Notre Dame	Receiving	Jayden Harrison	2 receptions, 47 yards
Purdue	Passing	Hudson Card	11/24, 124 yards, TD, 2 INT
Purdue	Rushing	Reggie Love III	10 carries, 61 yards
Purdue	Receiving	Kam Brown	1 reception, 52 yards

=== Miami (OH) ===
Miami RedHawks (0–2) vs. No. 17 Notre Dame Fighting Irish (2–1) – Game summary

Quarter	1	2	3	4	Total
RedHawks	0	3	0	0	3
No. 17 Fighting Irish	0	14	7	7	28

at Notre Dame Stadium, South Bend, Indiana

- Date: September 21, 2024
- Game time: 3:30 p.m. EST
- Game weather: Temperature: 86 °F (30 °C) • Wind: SW 3 MPH • Weather: Sunny
- Game attendance: 77,622
- Referee: Gary Patterson
- TV announcers (NBC): Dan Hicks (play-by-play), Jason Garrett (analyst), and Zora Stephenson (sideline reporter)
- Box score, Recap

Game information

First quarter

- No scoring plays this quarter.

Second quarter

- (12:32) MIA – Dom Dzioban 26-yard field goal (Drive: 10 plays, 59 yards, 4:09; Miami (OH) 3–0)
- (3:33) ND – Riley Leonard 8-yard run, Mitch Jeter kick (Drive: 10 plays, 87 yards, 4:59; Notre Dame 7–3)
- (1:05) ND – Beaux Collins 38-yard pass from Riley Leonard, Mitch Jeter kick (Drive: 6 plays, 81 yards, 0:56; Notre Dame 14–3)

Third quarter

- (4:17) ND – Jeremiyah Love 15-yard run, Mitch Jeter kick (Drive: 7 plays, 60 yards, 3:00; Notre Dame 21–3)

Fourth quarter

- (5:39) ND – Riley Leonard 50-yard run, Mitch Jeter kick (Drive: 5 plays, 69 yards, 2:34; Notre Dame 28–3)

Statistics	M-OH	ND
First downs	17	24
Total yards	229	428
Rushes/yards	28–110	36–270
Passing yards	119	158
Passing: Comp–Att–Int	14–36–2	17–28–0
Time of possession	29:54	30:06

Team	Category	Player	Statistics
Miami (OH)	Passing	Brett Gabbert	14/35, 119 yards, 2 INT
Miami (OH)	Rushing	Keyon Mozee	6 carries, 36 yards
Miami (OH)	Receiving	Cade McDonald	4 receptions, 52 yards
Notre Dame	Passing	Riley Leonard	16/25, 154 yards, TD
Notre Dame	Rushing	Riley Leonard	12 carries, 143 yards, 2 TD
Notre Dame	Receiving	Beaux Collins	4 receptions, 60 yards, TD

=== No. 15 Louisville ===
No. 15 Louisville Cardinals (3–0) vs. No. 16 Notre Dame Fighting Irish (3–1) – Game summary

Quarter	1	2	3	4	Total
No. 15 Cardinals	7	7	0	10	24
No. 16 Fighting Irish	21	3	0	7	31

at Notre Dame Stadium • South Bend, Indiana

- Date: September 28, 2024
- Game time: 3:30 p.m. EST
- Game weather: Temperature: 72 °F (22 °C) • Wind: NE 11 MPH • Weather: Cloudy
- Game attendance: 77,622
- Referee: Mike Roche
- TV announcers (Peacock): Paul Burmeister (play-by-play), Jason Garrett (analyst), and Zora Stephenson (sideline reporter)
- Box score, Recap

Game information

First quarter

- (13:30) LOU – Isaac Brown 10-yard pass from Tyler Shough, Brock Travelstead kick (Drive: 3 plays, 24 yards, 1:24; Louisville 7–0)
- (7:22) ND – Jeremiyah Love 6-yard run (Drive: 12 plays, 75 yards, 6:08; Tied 7-7)
- (4:59) ND – Jaden Greathouse 34-yard pass from Riley Leonard, Mitch Jeter kick (Drive: 12 plays, 53 yards, 2:05; Notre Dame 14–7)
- (2:40) ND – Riley Leonard 4-yard run, Mitch Jeter kick (Drive: 1 play, 4 yards, 0:03; Notre Dame 21–7)

Second quarter

- (12:28) LOU – J'Corey Brooks 5-yard pass from Tyler Shough, Brock Travelstead kick (Drive: 3 plays, 9 yards, 1:30; Notre Dame 21–14)
- (3:46) ND – Mitch Jeter 48-yard field goal (Drive: 4 plays, 6 yards, 2:14; Notre Dame 24–14)

Third quarter

No scoring plays this quarter

Fourth quarter

- (11:25) LOU – Brock Travelstead 56-yard field goal (Drive: 7 plays, 17 yards, 2:04; Notre Dame 24–17)
- (9:16) ND – Jeremiyah Love 32-yard pass from Riley Leonard, Mitch Jeter kick (Drive: 5 plays, 75 yards, 2:09; Notre Dame 31–17)
- (5:17) LOU – Ja'Corey Brooks 24-pass from Tyler Shough (Drive: 14 plays, 75 yards, 3:59; Notre Dame 31–24)

Statistics	LOU	ND
First downs	19	11
Total yards	395	280
Rushing yards	35–131	31–163
Passing yards	264	163
Passing: Comp–Att–Int	24–41–1	17–23–0
Time of possession	32:05	27:55

Team	Category	Player	Statistics
Louisville	Passing	Tyler Shough	24/41, 264 yards, 3 TD, INT
Louisville	Rushing	Isaac Brown	13 carries, 72 yards
Louisville	Receiving	Ja'Corey Brooks	5 receptions, 71 yards, 2 TD
Notre Dame	Passing	Riley Leonard	17/23, 163 yards, 2 TD
Notre Dame	Rushing	Riley Leonard	13 carries, 52 yards, TD
Notre Dame	Receiving	Jaden Greathouse	4 receptions, 61 yards, TD

=== Stanford (rivalry) ===
Stanford Cardinal (2–3) vs. No. 11 Notre Dame Fighting Irish (4–1) – Game summary

Quarter	1	2	3	4	Total
Cardinal	7	0	0	0	7
No. 11 Fighting Irish	7	14	21	7	49

at Notre Dame Stadium • South Bend, Indiana

- Date: October 12, 2024
- Game time: 3:30 p.m. EST
- Game weather: Temperature: 71 °F (22 °C) • Wind: SE 7 MPH • Weather: Cloudy
- Game attendance: 77,622
- Referee: Stuart Mullins
- TV announcers (NBC/CNBC): Dan Hicks (play-by-play), Jason Garrett (analyst), and Zora Stephenson (sideline reporter)
- Box score, Recap

Game information

First quarter

- (6:49) STAN – Justin Lamson 1-yard run, Emmett Kenny kick (Drive: 9 plays, 63 yards, 5:14; Stanford 7–0)
- (1:27) ND – Riley Leonard 6-yard run, Mitch Jeter kick (Drive: 12 plays, 75 yards, 5:22; Tied 7–7)

Second quarter

- (7:46) ND – Jayden Thomas 15-yard pass from Riley Leonard, Zac Yoakam kick (Drive: 7 plays, 52 yards, 3:20; Notre Dame 14–7)
- (1:11) ND – Kris Mitchell 5-yard pass from Riley Leonard, Zac Yoakam kick (Drive: 9 plays, 56 yards, 2:37; Notre Dame 21–7)

Third quarter

- (12:12) ND – Jadarian Price 16-yard run, Zac Yoakam kick (Drive: 2 plays, 17 yards, 0:40; Notre Dame 28–7)
- (6:49) ND – Jeremiyah Love 39-yard run, Zac Yoakam kick (Drive: 4 plays, 83 yards, 1:23; Notre Dame 35–7)
- (1:29) ND – Eli Raridon 5-yard pass from Riley Leonard, Zac Yoakam kick (Drive: 5 plays, 64 yards, 2:37; Notre Dame 42–7)

Fourth quarter

- (9:17) ND – Aneyas Williams 19-yard run, Zac Yoakam kick (Drive: 11 plays, 60 yards, 5:25; Notre Dame 49–7)

Statistics	STAN	ND
First downs	14	24
Total yards	59–200	66–477
Rushing yards	41–113	39–229
Passing yards	87	248
Passing: Comp–Att–Int	10–18–0	18–27–0
Time of possession	30:44	29:16

Team	Category	Player	Statistics
Stanford	Passing	Ashton Daniels	8/13, 74 yards
Stanford	Rushing	Chris Davis Jr.	10 carries, 45 yards
Stanford	Receiving	Ismael Cisse	2 receptions, 29 yards
Notre Dame	Passing	Riley Leonard	16/22, 229 yards, 3 TD
Notre Dame	Rushing	Jeremiyah Love	6 carries, 53 yards, TD
Notre Dame	Receiving	Beaux Collins	4 receptions, 85 yards

=== at Georgia Tech ===
No. 12 Notre Dame Fighting Irish (5–1) vs. Georgia Tech Yellow Jackets (5–2) – Game summary

Quarter	1	2	3	4	Total
No. 12 Fighting Irish	0	14	7	10	31
Yellow Jackets	7	0	0	6	13

at Mercedes-Benz Stadium • Atlanta, Georgia

- Date: October 19, 2024
- Game time: 3:30 p.m. EST
- Game weather: Temperature: 71 °F (22 °C) • Wind: N/A • Weather: Sunny/Indoors (roof closed)
- Game attendance: 59,021
- Referee: Gary Patterson
- TV announcers (ESPN): Bob Wischusen (play-by-play), Louis Riddick (analyst), and Kris Budden (sideline reporter)
- Box score, Recap

Game information

First quarter

- (0:00) GT – Jamal Haynes 1-yard run, Aidan Birr kick (Drive: 13 plays, 71 yards, 7:06; Georgia Tech 7–0)

Second quarter

- (7:00) ND – Riley Leonard 1-yard run, Zac Yoakam kick (Drive: 14 plays, 75 yards, 8:00; Tied 7–7)
- (1:53) ND – Riley Leonard 12-yard run, Zac Yoakam kick (Drive: 5 plays, 68 yards, 2:51; Notre Dame 14–7)

Third quarter

- (11:01) ND – Jeremiyah Love 1-yard run, Zac Yoakam kick (Drive: 6 plays, 60 yards, 3:10; Notre Dame 21–7)

Fourth quarter

- (10:01) ND – Zac Yoakam 42-yard field goal (Drive: 11 plays, 32 yards, 3:59; Notre Dame 24–7)
- (2:37) ND – Adon Shuler 36-yard interception, Zac Yoakam kick (Drive: 1 play, 0 yards, 0:10; Notre Dame 31–7)
- (0:23) GT – Chase Lane 6-yard pass from Zach Pyron, Two-point conversion failed (Drive: 9 plays, 80 yards, 2:08; Notre Dame 31–13)

Statistics	ND	GT
First downs	23	18
Total yards	69–385	67–333
Rushing yards	39–168	29–64
Passing yards	217	269
Passing: Comp–Att–Int	21–30–1	20–38–2
Time of possession	35:45	24:15

Team	Category	Player	Statistics
Notre Dame	Passing	Riley Leonard	20/29, 203 yards, INT
Notre Dame	Rushing	Jadarian Price	8 carries, 69 yards
Notre Dame	Receiving	Jeremiyah Love	3 receptions, 57 yards
Georgia Tech	Passing	Zach Pyron	20/36, 269 yards, TD, 2 INT
Georgia Tech	Rushing	Zach Pyron	13 carries, 45 yards
Georgia Tech	Receiving	Abdul Janneh Jr.	1 reception, 60 yards

=== at No. 24 Navy (rivalry) ===
No. 12 Notre Dame Fighting Irish (6–1) vs. No. 24 Navy Midshipmen (6–0) – Game summary

Quarter	1	2	3	4	Total
No. 12 Fighting Irish	14	17	13	7	51
No. 24 Midshipmen	0	7	7	0	14

at MetLife Stadium • East Rutherford, New Jersey

- Date: October 26, 2024
- Game time: 12:00 p.m. EST
- Game weather: Temperature: 63 °F (17 °C) • Wind: SE 8 MPH • Weather: Sunny
- Game attendance: 76,112
- Referee: Marcus Woods
- TV announcers (ABC): Sean McDonough (play-by-play), Greg McElroy (analyst), and Molly McGrath (sideline reporter)
- Box score, Recap

Game information

First quarter

- (10:28) ND – Riley Leonard 1-yard run, Zac Yoakam kick (Drive: 9 plays, 75 yards, 4:32; Notre Dame 7–0)
- (5:44) ND – Kris Mitchell 6-yard pass from Riley Leonard, Zac Yoakam kick (Drive: 3 plays, 7 yards, 1:19; Notre Dame 14–0)

Second quarter

- (13:33) NAVY – Blake Horvath 47-yard run, Nathan Kirkwood kick (Drive: 5 plays, 80 yards, 2:18; Notre Dame 14–7)
- (12:28) ND – Jeremiyah Love 64-yard run, Zac Yoakam kick (Drive: 3 plays, 75 yards, 1:08; Notre Dame 21–7)
- (5:05) ND – Jeremiyah Love 2-yard run, Zac Yoakam kick (Drive: 9 plays, 40 yards, 4:57; Notre Dame 28–7)
- (0:26) ND – Zac Yoakam 32-yard field goal (Drive: 9 plays, 63 yards, 1:20; Notre Dame 31–7)

Third quarter

- (8:44) NAVY – Eli Heidenreich 1-yard run, Nathan Kirkwood kick (Drive: 12 plays, 75 yards, 6:16; Notre Dame 31–14)
- (5:35) ND – Beaux Collins 1-yard run, Zac Yoakam kick (Drive: 12 plays, 75 yards, 6:16; Notre Dame 38–14)
- (4:18) ND – Jaylen Sneed 0-yard fumble return (Drive: 3 plays, -3 yards, 1:17; Notre Dame 44–14)

Fourth quarter

- (7:08) ND – Kadren Young 4-yard run, Zac Yoakam kick (Drive: 4 plays, 16 yards, 2:12; Notre Dame 51–14)

Statistics	ND	NAVY
First downs	20	17
Plays–yards	65–466	57–310
Rushes–yards	40–265	43–222
Passing yards	201	88
Passing: Comp–Att–Int	15–25–0	7–14–1
Time of possession	30:29	29:31

Team	Category	Player	Statistics
Notre Dame	Passing	Riley Leonard	13/21, 178 yards, 2 TD
Notre Dame	Rushing	Jeremiyah Love	12 carries, 102 yards, 2 TD
Notre Dame	Receiving	Jordan Faison	4 receptions, 52 yards
Navy	Passing	Blake Horvath	7/13, 88 yards, INT
Navy	Rushing	Blake Horvath	13 carries, 129 yards, TD
Navy	Receiving	Alex Tecza	2 receptions, 39 yards

=== Florida State ===
Florida State Seminoles (1–8) vs. No. 10 Notre Dame Fighting Irish (7–1) – Game summary

Quarter	1	2	3	4	Total
Seminoles	3	0	0	0	3
No. 10 Fighting Irish	7	14	10	21	52

at Notre Dame Stadium • South Bend, Indiana

- Date: November 9, 2024
- Game time: 7:30 p.m. EST
- Game weather: Temperature: 53 °F (12 °C) • Wind: SE 10 MPH • Weather: Cloudy
- Game attendance: 77,622
- Referee: Adam Savoie
- TV announcers (NBC): Noah Eagle (play-by-play), Todd Blackledge (analyst), and Kathryn Tappen (sideline reporter)
- Box score, Recap

Game information

First quarter

- (13:17) ND – Riley Leonard 34-yard run, Mitch Jeter kick (Drive: 5 plays, 75 yards, 1:43; Notre Dame 7–0)
- (5:44) FS – Ryan Fitzgerald 23-yard field goal (Drive: 16 plays, 75 yards, 7:52; Notre Dame 7–3)

Second quarter

- (14:35) ND – Jadarian Price 65-yard run, Mitch Jeter kick (Drive: 3 plays, 84 yards, 1:05; Notre Dame 14–3)
- (0:17) ND – Mitchell Evans 12-yard pass from Riley Leonard, Mitch Jeter kick (Drive: 12 plays, 77 yards, 1:31; Notre Dame 21–3)

Third quarter

- (9:38) ND – Riley Leonard 6-yard run, Mitch Jeter kick (Drive: 6 plays, 38 yards, 2:55; Notre Dame 28–14)
- (1:05) ND – Mitch Jeter 28-yard field goal (Drive: 6 plays, 50 yards, 2:51; Notre Dame 31–3)

Fourth quarter

- (10:53) ND – Jeremiyah Love 1-yard run, Mitch Jeter kick (Drive: 7 plays, 65 yards, 3:51; Notre Dame 38–3)
- (4:06) ND – Deion Colzie 7-yard pass from Steve Angeli, Mitch Jeter kick (Drive: 8 plays, 57 yards, 4:20; Notre Dame 45–3)
- (1:23) ND – Luke Talich 79-yard interception return, Mitch Jeter kick (Drive: 10 plays, 55 yards, 2:43; Notre Dame 52–3)

Statistics	FSU	ND
First downs	14	22
Total yards	69–208	62–453
Rushing yards	43–120	32–201
Passing yards	88	252
Passing: Comp–Att–Int	0–0–0	0–0–0
Time of possession	33:11	26:49

Team	Category	Player	Statistics
Florida State	Passing	Brock Glenn	5/18, 51 yards, 2 INT
Florida State	Rushing	Lawrance Toafili	16 carries, 77 yards
Florida State	Receiving	Lawayne McCoy	2 receptions, 22 yards
Notre Dame	Passing	Riley Leonard	14/27, 215 yards, TD
Notre Dame	Rushing	Jadarian Price	7 carries, 95 yards, TD
Notre Dame	Receiving	Jaden Greathouse	5 receptions, 66 yards

=== Virginia ===
Virginia Cavaliers (5–4) vs. No. 8 Notre Dame Fighting Irish (8–1) – Game summary

Quarter	1	2	3	4	Total
Cavaliers	0	0	7	7	14
No. 8 Fighting Irish	7	21	7	0	35

at Notre Dame Stadium • South Bend, Indiana

- Date: November 16, 2024
- Game time: 3:00 p.m. EST
- Game weather: Temperature: 54 °F (12 °C) • Wind: SE 9 MPH • Weather: Cloudy
- Game attendance: 77,622
- Referee: Justin Elliott
- TV announcers (NBC): Dan Hicks (play-by-play), Jason Garrett (analyst), and Zora Stephenson (sideline reporter)
- Box score, Recap

Game information

First quarter

- (13:04) ND – Jeremiyah Love 4-yard run, Mitch Jeter kick (Drive: 4 plays, 25 yards, 1:52; Notre Dame 7–0)

Second quarter

- (6:34) ND – Jayden Harrison 8-yard pass from Riley Leonard, Mitch Jeter kick (Drive: 9 plays, 88 yards, 3:42; Notre Dame 14–0)
- (2:20) ND – Cooper Flanagan 2-yard pass from Riley Leonard, Mitch Jeter kick (Drive: 1 play, 2 yards, 0:03; Notre Dame 21–0)
- (0:49) ND – Mitchell Evans 16-yard pass from Riley Leonard, Mitch Jeter kick (Drive: 3 plays, 32 yards, 0:34; Notre Dame 28–0)

Third quarter

- (9:38) ND – Jeremiyah Love 76-yard run, Mitch Jeter kick (Drive: 5 plays, 75 yards, 1:46; Notre Dame 35–0)
- (7:52) VA – Tony Muskett 18-yard run, Will Bettridge kick (Drive: 5 plays, 75 yards, 1:46; Notre Dame 35–7)

Fourth quarter

- (0:18) VA – Tony Muskett 2-yard run, Will Bettridge kick (Drive: 16 plays, 80 yards, 5:42; Notre Dame 35–14)

Statistics	UVA	ND
First downs	15	21
Total yards	68–300	71–448
Rushing yards	32–128	38–234
Passing yards	172	214
Passing: Comp–Att–Int	17–36–3	22–33–1
Time of possession	25:24	34:36

Team	Category	Player	Statistics
Virginia	Passing	Tony Muskett	9/14, 103 yards
Virginia	Rushing	Xavier Brown	11 carries, 52 yards
Virginia	Receiving	Malachi Fields	4 receptions, 81 yards
Notre Dame	Passing	Riley Leonard	22/33, 214 yards, 3 TD, INT
Notre Dame	Rushing	Jeremiyah Love	16 carries, 137 yards, 2 TD
Notre Dame	Receiving	Jayden Harrison	3 receptions, 41 yards, TD

=== vs. No. 19 Army (rivalry) ===
The 2024 meeting between Army and Notre Dame at new Yankee Stadium commemorated the Notre Dame's Four Horsemen backfield that led them to an upset win over Army at the Polo Grounds in 1924. Notre Dame wore special blue-gray uniforms, a nod to the blue-gray sky mentioned in Grantland Rice's 1924 "Four Horsemen" dispatch in his opening line, "outlined against a blue-gray October sky, the Four Horsemen rode again." While the shiny gold uniform numbers represent the Gothic Blackletter of New York City's newspaper mastheads. Notre Dame again won easily, 49–14, handing Army their first loss of the season.

No. 19 Army Black Knights (9–0) vs. No. 6 Notre Dame Fighting Irish (9–1) – Game summary

Quarter	1	2	3	4	Total
No. 19 Black Knights	0	7	0	7	14
No. 6 Fighting Irish	14	14	14	7	49

at Yankee Stadium • Bronx, NY

- Date: November 23, 2024
- Game time: 7:00 p.m. EST
- Game weather: Temperature: 45 °F (7 °C) • Wind: W 10 MPH • Weather: Clear
- Game attendance: 47,352
- Referee: Mike Roche
- TV announcers (NBC): Noah Eagle (play-by-play), Todd Blackledge (analyst), and Kathryn Tappen (sideline reporter)
- Box score, Recap

Game information

First quarter

- (10:24) ND – Jordan Faison 28-yard pass from Riley Leonard, Mitch Jeter kick (Drive: 5 plays, 68 yards, 2:17; Notre Dame 7–0)
- (6:30) ND – Jeremiyah Love 6-yard pass from Riley Leonard, Mitch Jeter kick (Drive: 3 plays, 7 yards, 1:38; Notre Dame 14–0)

Second quarter

- (13:53) ARMY – Bryson Daily 4-yard run, Trey Gronotte kick (Drive: 12 plays, 75 yards, 7:37; Notre Dame 14–7)
- (4:35) ND – Jeremiyah Love 14-yard run, Mitch Jeter kick (Drive: 3 plays, 41 yards, 1:23; Notre Dame 21–7)
- (0:26) ND – Jadarian Price 2-yard run, Mitch Jeter kick (Drive: 8 plays, 50 yards, 2:14; Notre Dame 28–7)

Third quarter

- (14:44) ND – Jeremiyah Love 68-yard run, Mitch Jeter kick (Drive: 1 play, 68 yards, 0:10; Notre Dame 35–7)
- (0:45) ND – Jadarian Price 10-yard run, Mitch Jeter kick (Drive: 8 plays, 57 yards, 3:33; Notre Dame 42–7)

Fourth quarter

- (10:40) ND – Aneyas Williams 58-yard run, Mitch Jeter kick (Drive: 1 play, 58 yards, 0:12; Notre Dame 49–7)
- (0:22) ARMY – Bryson Daily 1-yard run, Trey Gronotte kick (Drive: 17 plays, 75 yards, 10:18; Notre Dame 49–14)

Statistics	ARMY	ND
First downs	15	20
Total yards	67–233	47–462
Rushing yards	58–207	29–273
Passing yards	26	189
Passing: Comp–Att–Int	4–9–0	14–18–0
Time of possession	39:49	20:11

Team	Category	Player	Statistics
Army	Passing	Bryson Daily	4/8, 26 yards
Army	Rushing	Bryson Daily	39 carries, 139 yards, 2 TD
Army	Receiving	Casey Reynolds	1 reception, 11 yards
Notre Dame	Passing	Riley Leonard	10/13, 148 yards, 2 TD
Notre Dame	Rushing	Jeremiyah Love	7 carries, 130 yards, 2 TD
Notre Dame	Receiving	Jordan Faison	2 receptions, 46 yards, TD

=== at USC (rivalry) ===
No. 5 Notre Dame Fighting Irish (10–1) vs. USC Trojans (6–5) – Game summary

Quarter	1	2	3	4	Total
No. 5 Fighting Irish	7	7	21	14	49
Trojans	0	14	7	14	35

at Los Angeles Memorial Coliseum • Los Angeles, California

- Date: November 30, 2024
- Game time: 3:30 p.m.
- Game weather: Temperature: 77 °F (25 °C) • Wind: E 2 MPH • Weather: Cloudy
- Game attendance: 73,241
- Referee: Rod Snodgrass
- TV announcers (CBS): Brad Nessler (play-by-play), Gary Danielson (analyst), and Jenny Dell (sideline reporter)
- Box score, Recap

Game information

First quarter

- (2:28) ND – Jeremiyah Love 1-yard run, Mitch Jeter kick (Drive: 13 plays, 72 yards, 7:14; Notre Dame 7–0)

Second quarter

- (12:07) USC – Jayden Maiava 1-yard run, Michael Lantz kick (Drive: 5 plays, 37 yards, 2:47; Tied 7–7)
- (0:59) ND – Eli Raridon 12-yard pass from Riley Leonard, Mitch Jeter kick (Drive: 7 plays, 65 yards, 2:27; Notre Dame 14–7)
- (0:24) USC – Ja'Kobi Lane 12-yard pass from Jayden Maiava, Michael Lanz kick (Drive: 5 plays, 78 yards, 0:31; Tied 14–14)

Third quarter

- (12:38) ND – Jadarian Price 36-yard run, Mitch Jeter kick (Drive: 6 plays, 75 yards, 2:22; Notre Dame 21–14)
- (9:06) USC – Jayden Maiava 1-yard run, Michael Lantz kick (Drive: 8 plays, 77 yards, 3:27; Tied 21–21)
- (6:27) ND – Riley Leonard 2-yard run, Mitch Jeter (Drive: 6 plays, 75 yards, 1:06; Notre Dame 28–14)
- (1:11) ND – Mitchell Evans 23-yard pass from Riley Leonard, Mitch Jeter kick (Drive: 3 plays, 62 yards, 1:06; Notre Dame 35–21)

Fourth quarter

- (8:43) USC – Ja'Kobi Lane 6-yard pass from Jayden Maiava, Michael Lantz kick (Drive: 5 plays, 45 yards, 3:09; Notre Dame 35–28)
- (3:39) ND – Christian Gray 99-yard interception return, Mitch Jeter kick (Drive: 6 plays, 63 yards, 2:21; Notre Dame 42–28)
- (1:18) ND – Xavier Watts 100-yard interception return, Mitch Jeter kick (Drive: 8 plays, 62 yards, 2:21; Notre Dame 49–28)
- (0:13) USC – Ja'Kobi Lane 8-yard pass from Jayden Maiava, Michael Lantz kick (Drive: 5 plays, 75 yards, 1:05; Notre Dame 49–35)

Statistics	ND	USC
First downs	23	29
Total yards	61–436	77–557
Rushing yards	38–258	28–197
Passing yards	178	360
Passing: Comp–Att–Int	18–23–1	27–49–2
Time of possession	29:45	30:15

Team	Category	Player	Statistics
Notre Dame	Passing	Riley Leonard	17/22, 155 yards, 2 TD, INT
Notre Dame	Rushing	Jadarian Price	12 carries, 111 yards, TD
Notre Dame	Receiving	Mitchell Evans	5 receptions, 59 yards, TD
USC	Passing	Jayden Maiava	27/49, 360 yards, 3 TD, 2 INT
USC	Rushing	Quinten Joyner	10 carries, 83 yards
USC	Receiving	Makai Lemon	9 receptions, 133 yards

=== No. 8 Indiana (College Football Playoff – First Round) ===
No. 8 Indiana Hoosiers (11–1) at No. 5 Notre Dame Fighting Irish (11–1) – Game summary

Quarter	1	2	3	4	Total
No. 8 Hoosiers	0	3	0	14	17
No. 5 Fighting Irish	7	10	3	7	27

at Notre Dame Stadium • South Bend, Indiana

- Date: December 20, 2024
- Game time: 8:00 p.m.
- Game weather: Temperature: 27 °F (−3 °C) • Wind: N/A • Weather: Cloudy
- Game attendance: 77,622
- Referee: David Alvarez
- TV announcers (ESPN/ABC): Sean McDonough (play-by-play), Greg McElroy (analyst), and Molly McGrath (sideline)
- Box score, Recap

Game information

First quarter

- (10:57) ND – Jeremiyah Love 98-yard run, Mitch Jeter kick (Drive: 1 play, 98 yards, 0:14; Notre Dame 7–0)

Second quarter

- (12:52) ND – Jayden Thomas 5-yard pass from Riley Leonard, Mitch Jeter kick (Drive: 16 plays, 83 yards, 9:08; Notre Dame 14–0)
- (3:26) IU – Nicolas Radicic 34-yard field goal (Drive: 9 plays, 48 yards, 4:00; Notre Dame 14–3)
- (0:07) ND – Mitch Jeter 49-yard field goal (Drive: 12 plays, 52 yards, 3:19; Notre Dame 17–3)

Third quarter

- (4:21) ND – Mitch Jeter 33-yard field goal (Drive: 11 plays, 28 yards, 6:43; Notre Dame 20–3)

Fourth quarter

- (4:50) ND – Riley Leonard 1-yard run, Mitch Jeter kick (Drive: 9 plays, 78 yards, 5:44; Notre Dame 27–3)
- (1:27) IU – Myles Price 7-yard pass from Kurtis Rourke, Kurtis Rourke pass to Elijah Sarratt for Two-Point Conversion (Drive: 12 plays, 76 yards, 3:23; Notre Dame 27–11)
- (0:25) IU – Omar Cooper Jr. 23-yard pass from Kurtis Rourke, Two-Point Conversion failed (Drive: 8 plays, 50 yards, 1:02; Notre Dame 27–17)

This game marked the first time a home game would air on ESPN and ABC since the 1990 season. The reason it aired on those networks instead of NBC was due to the fact that playoff games aren't part of Notre Dame's deal with NBC.

Statistics	IU	ND
First downs	17	20
Total yards	278	394
Rushing yards	63	193
Passing yards	215	201
Passing: Comp–Att–Int	20–33–1	23–32–1
Time of possession	24:17	35:43

Team	Category	Player	Statistics
Indiana	Passing	Kurtis Rourke	20/34, 215 yards, 2 TD, INT
Indiana	Rushing	Justice Ellison	11 carries, 37 yards
Indiana	Receiving	Elijah Sarratt	4 receptions, 67 yards
Notre Dame	Passing	Riley Leonard	23/32, 201 yards, TD, INT
Notre Dame	Rushing	Jeremiyah Love	8 carries, 108 yards, TD
Notre Dame	Receiving	Jordan Faison	7 receptions, 89 yards

=== No. 2 Georgia (Sugar Bowl / College Football Playoff Quarterfinal) ===
This will be the fourth meeting between the Fighting Irish and the Bulldogs. The two teams have previously met in the postseason just once, in the 1981 Sugar Bowl, which resulted in a 17–10 Georgia win. Though Georgia won all three previous matchups between the teams, each game was decided by seven points or less.

The game was delayed from January 1 to January 2 after a truck attack that took place in the nearby French Quarter.

2025 Sugar Bowl
No. 5 Notre Dame Fighting Irish (12–1) vs No. 2 Georgia Bulldogs (11–2) – Game summary

Quarter	1	2	3	4	Total
No. 5 Fighting Irish	0	13	7	3	23
No. 2 Bulldogs	0	3	7	0	10

at Caesars Superdome • New Orleans, Louisiana

- Date: January 2, 2025 (Note: The Sugar Bowl was originally scheduled for January 1, but was postponed a day later due to the terrorist attack that took place early that morning in the nearby French Quarter.)
- Game time: 4:00 p.m. EST
- Game weather: Temperature: 61 °F (16 °C) • Wind: E 7 MPH • Weather: Indoors
- Game attendance: 57,267
- Referee: Michael Vandervelde (Big 12)
- TV announcers (ESPN): Sean McDonough (play-by-play), Greg McElroy (analyst), and Molly McGrath (sideline)
- Box score, Recap

Game information
First quarter
- No scoring plays

Second quarter

- (12:14) UGA - Peyton Woodring 41-yard field goal (Drive: 5 plays, 55 yards, 2:00; Georgia 3–0)
- (8:20) ND - Mitch Jeter 44-yard field goal (Drive: 8 plays, 49 yards, 3:54; Tied 3–3)
- (0:39) ND - Mitch Jeter 48-yard field goal (Drive: 10 plays, 32 yards, 2:28; Notre Dame 6–3)
- (0:27) ND - Beaux Collins 13-yard pass from Riley Leonard, Mitch Jeter kick (Drive: 1 play, 13 yards, 0:06; Notre Dame 13–3)

Third quarter

- (14:45) ND - Jayden Harrison 98-yard kickoff return, Mitch Jeter kick (Drive: 2 plays, 16 yards, 0:27; Notre Dame 20–3)
- (9:36) UGA - Cash Jones 32-yard pass from Gunner Stockton, Peyton Woodring kick (Drive: 5 plays, 63 yards, 2:12; Notre Dame 20–10)

Fourth quarter

- (13:47) ND - Mitch Jeter 47-yard field goal (Drive: 8 plays, 29 yards, 4:18; Notre Dame 23–10)

Statistics	ND	UGA
First downs	14	16
Total yards	244	296
Rushing yards	154	62
Passing yards	90	234
Passing: Comp–Att–Int	15–24–0	20–32–0
Time of possession	31:47	28:13

Team	Category	Player	Statistics
Notre Dame	Passing	Riley Leonard	15/24, 90 yards, TD
Notre Dame	Rushing	Riley Leonard	14 carries, 80 yards
Notre Dame	Receiving	Jordan Faison	4 receptions, 46 yards
Georgia	Passing	Gunner Stockton	20/32, 234 yards, TD
Georgia	Rushing	Trevor Etienne	11 carries, 38 yards
Georgia	Receiving	Arian Smith	1 reception, 67 yards

=== No. 4 Penn State (Orange Bowl / College Football Playoff Semifinal) ===
College Football Playoff Semifinal at the 2025 Capital One Orange Bowl
No. 5 Notre Dame (13–1) vs No. 4 Penn State Nittany Lions (13–2)

Quarter	1	2	3	4	Total
No. 5 Fighting Irish	0	3	7	17	27
No. 4 Nittany Lions	0	10	0	14	24

at Hard Rock Stadium • Miami Gardens, Florida

- Date: January 9, 2025
- Game time: 7:30 p.m. EST
- Game weather: Temperature: 56 °F (13 °C) • Wind: N/A • Weather: Sunny
- Game attendance: 66,881
- Referee: Michael Vandervelde
- TV announcers (ESPN): Sean McDonough (play-by-play), Greg McElroy (color commentator), Molly McGrath and Katie George (sideline)
- Box score, Recap

Game information

First quarter

No scoring

Second quarter

- PSU – Ryan Barker, 20-yard field goal, 14:52 (PSU 3–0)
- PSU – Nicholas Singleton, 5-yard TD run, Barker kick, 2:18 (PSU 10–0)
- ND – Mitch Jeter, 41-yard field goal, 0:00 (PSU 10-3)

Third quarter

- ND – Riley Leonard, 3-yard TD run, Jeter kick, 10:46 (TIE 10–10)

Fourth quarter

- ND – Jeremiyah Love, 2-yard TD run, Jeter kick, 14:07 (UND 17–10)
- PSU – Singleton, 7-yard TD run, Barker kick, 10:20 (TIE 17–17)
- PSU – Singleton, 7-yard TD run, Barker kick, 7:55 (PSU 24–17)
- ND – Jaden Greathouse, 54-yard TD pass from Leonard, Jeter kick, 4:38 (TIE 24–24)
- ND – Jeter, 41-yard field goal, 0:08 (UND 27–24)

Statistics	ND	PSU
First downs	23	20
Total yards	73–383	75–339
Rushing yards	42–116	42–204
Passing yards	267	135
Passing: comp–att–int	21–31–2	12–23–1
Time of possession	29:56	30:04

Team	Category	Player	Statistics
Notre Dame	Passing	Riley Leonard	15/23, 223 yards, TD, 2 INT
Notre Dame	Rushing	Jeremiyah Love	11 carries, 45 yards, TD
Notre Dame	Receiving	Jaden Greathouse	7 receptions, 105 yards, TD
Penn State	Passing	Drew Allar	12/23, 135 yards, INT
Penn State	Rushing	Nicholas Singleton	15 carries, 84 yards, 3 TD
Penn State	Receiving	Tyler Warren	6 receptions, 75 yards

=== vs No. 6 Ohio State (CFP National Championship Game) ===
2025 College Football Playoff National Championship
No. 6 Ohio State Buckeyes (13-2, 7-2) vs. No. 5 Notre Dame Fighting Irish (14-1) – Game summary

Quarter	1	2	3	4	Total
No. 6 Buckeyes	0	21	10	3	34
No. 5 Fighting Irish	7	0	8	8	23

at Mercedes-Benz Stadium • Atlanta, Georgia

- Date: January 20, 2025
- Game time: 7:30 p.m. EST
- Game weather: Indoors (roof closed)
- Referee: Steve Marlowe
- TV announcers (ESPN): Chris Fowler (play-by-play), Kirk Herbstreit (analyst), Holly Rowe (sideline reporter), and Molly McGrath (sideline reporter)

Game information

First quarter

- (5:15) ND – Riley Leonard 1-yard run, Mitch Jeter kick (Drive: 18 plays, 75 yards, 9:45; Notre Dame 7–0)

Second quarter

- (14:10) OSU – Jeremiah Smith 8-yard pass from Will Howard, Jayden Fielding kick (Drive: 11 plays, 75 yards, 6:05; Tied 7–7)
- (6:15) OSU – Quinshon Judkins 9-yard run, Jayden Fielding kick (Drive: 10 plays, 76 yards, 6:06; Ohio State 14–7)
- (0:27) OSU – Quinshon Judkins 6-yard pass from Will Howard, Jayden Fielding kick (Drive: 12 plays, 80 yards, 4:26; Ohio State 21–7)

Third quarter

- (12:46) OSU – Quinshon Judkins 1-yard run, Jayden Fielding kick (Drive: 5 play, 75 yards, 12:46; Ohio State 28–7)
- (7:52) OSU – Jayden Fielding 46-yard field goal (Drive: 6 plays, 5 yards, 3:26; Ohio State 31–7)
- (3:03) ND – Jaden Greathouse 34-yard pass from Riley Leonard, 2-point conversion (Drive: 10 plays, 75 yards, 4:49; Ohio State 31–15)

Fourth quarter

- (4:15) ND – Jaden Greathouse 30-yard pass from Riley Leonard, 2-point conversion (Drive: 6 plays, 80 yards, 2:10; Ohio State 31–23)
- (0:26) OSU – Jayden Fielding 33-yard field goal (Drive: 9 plays, 61 yards, 3:49; Ohio State 34–23)

Statistics	OSU	ND
First downs	22	19
Plays–yards	62–445	58–308
Rushes–yards	41–214	26–53
Passing yards	231	255
Passing: comp–att–int	17–21–0	22–32–0
Time of possession	32:25	27:35

Team	Category	Player	Statistics
Ohio State	Passing	Will Howard	17/21, 231 yards, 2 TD
Ohio State	Rushing	Quinshon Judkins	11 carries, 100 yards, 2 TD
Ohio State	Receiving	Jeremiah Smith	5 receptions, 88 yards, TD
Notre Dame	Passing	Riley Leonard	22/31, 255 yards, 2 TD
Notre Dame	Rushing	Riley Leonard	17 carries, 40 yards, TD
Notre Dame	Receiving	Jaden Greathouse	6 receptions, 128 yards, 2 TD

== Personnel ==
=== Roster ===
2024 Notre Dame Fighting Irish football team roster
Players
Coaches
Offense

Pos.	#	Name	Class
WR	0	Deion Colzie	RJr
WR	1	Jaden Greathouse	So
WR	2	Jayden Harrison	RSr
RB	3	Gi'Bran Payne (injured)	RSo
RB	4	Jeremiyah Love	So
WR	5	Beaux Collins	Sr
WR	6	Jordan Faison	So
QB	8	Kenny Minchey	RFr
TE	9	Eli Raridon	Jr
WR	10	Kris Mitchell	RSr
WR	11	KK Smith (injured)	RFr
QB	12	CJ Carr	Fr
QB	13	Riley Leonard (C)	Sr
WR	14	Micah Gilbert	Fr
QB	15	Anthony Rezac (W)	Fr
WR	17	Cam Williams	Fr
QB	18	Steve Angeli	RSo
WR	19	Logan Saldate	Fr
RB	20	Aneyas Williams	Fr
RB	21	Kedren Young	Fr
RB	22	Devyn Ford	RSr
RB	24	Jadarian Price	RSo
RB	25	Dylan Devezin (W)	Jr
WR	26	Tyler Buchner (W)	RJr
RB	32	Justin Fisher (W)	Jr
WR	33	Matt Jeffery (W)	Fr
RB	35	Jake Tafelski (W)	RSr
TE	38	Davis Sherwood	Sr
TE	39	Andrew Yanoshak (W)	Sr
TE	42	Henry Garrity (W)	So
OL	50	Rocco Spindler	RJr
OL	54	Anthonie Knapp (injured)	Fr
OL	55	Chris Terek	RFr
OL	56	Charles Jagusah	RFr
OL	59	Aamil Wagner	RSo
OL	60	Max Anderson (W)	Fr
OL	61	Robbie Wollan (injured) (W)	Fr
OL	64	Joe Otting	RFr
OL	70	Ashton Craig (injured)	RSo
OL	71	Styles Prescod (injured)	Fr
OL	72	Sam Pendleton	RFr
OL	73	Peter Jones	Fr
OL	74	Billy Schrauth	RSo
OL	75	Sullivan Absher	RFr
OL	76	Guerby Lambert	Fr
OL	77	Ty Chan	RSo
OL	78	Pat Coogan	RJr
OL	79	Tosh Baker	RSr
WR	80	Xavier Southall (W)	Fr
WR	81	Jack Polian (W)	Sr
WR	82	Leo Scheidler (W)	Jr
WR	83	Jayden Thomas	RJr
TE	84	Kevin Bauman	RSr
TE	85	Jack Larsen	Fr
WR	86	Alex Whitman (W)	So
TE	87	Cooper Flanagan (injured)	So
TE	88	Mitchell Evans	Sr
TE	89	Charlie Selna (W)	RSr

Defense

Pos.	#	Name	Class
S	0	Xavier Watts (C)	RSr
S	1	Jordan Clark	RSr
S	2	Rod Heard II	RSr
LB	3	Jaylen Sneed	RSo
LB	4	Jaiden Ausberry	RFr
DL	5	Boubacar Traore (injured)	RFr
CB	7	Jaden Mickey	Jr
S	8	Adon Shuler	RFr
DL	9	RJ Oben	RSr
DL	10	Loghan Thomas	Fr
DL	12	Jordan Botelho (injured)	RSr
S	13	Ben Minich	RFr
CB	15	Leonard Moore	Fr
S	16	Tae Johnson	Fr
DL	17	Brenan Vernon	RFr
CB	18	Chance Tucker (injured)	RJr
CB	19	Marty Auer (injured) (W)	Sr
CB	20	Benjamin Morrison (injured) (C)	Jr
CB	21	Karson Hobbs	Fr
S	23	Kennedy Urlacher	Fr
LB	24	Jack Kiser (C)	RSr
LB	25	Preston Zinter	RFr
LB	27	Kyngstonn Viliamu-Asa	Fr
S	28	Luke Talich	So
CB	29	Christian Gray	So
DL	30	Bryce Young	Fr
S	31	Taebron Bennie-Powell (injured)	Fr
CB	32	Isaiah Dunn (W)	Jr
LB	33	Tre Reader (W)	Jr
LB	34	Drayk Bowen	So
LB	35	Teddy Rezac	Fr
LB	36	Bodie Kahoun (injured)	Fr
CB	37	Max Hurleman (W)	RSr
LB	38	Tommy Powlus (W)	Fr
DL	40	Joshua Burnham	RSo
DL	41	Donovan Hinish	RSo
DL	42	Cole Mullins	Fr
LB	43	Kahanu Kia (injured)	RFr
DL	44	Junior Tuihalamaka	Jr
DL	45	Kobi Onyiuke (W)	Jr
LB	46	Jerry Rullo (W)	Jr
DL	47	Jason Onye (injured)	RJr
CB	48	Mickey Brown (W)	Jr
CB	49	Charles Du (W)	Jr
DL	56	Howard Cross III	RSr
DL	58	Grant Ristoff (W)	RSr
DL	59	Sean Sevillano Jr.	Fr
DL	88	Armel Mukam	RFr
DL	93	Quentin Autry (injured) (W)	RSr
DL	97	Gabriel Rubio	RJr
DL	98	Devan Houstan	RFr
DL	99	Rylie Mills (injured) (C)	RSr

Special teams

Pos.	#	Name	Class
P	16	James Rendell	RSr
K	26	Chris Salerno (W)	Sr
LS	39	Rino Monteforte (W)	Jr
K	48	Marcello Diomede (W)	So
LS	49	Andrew Kros (W)	So
P, K	90	Eric Goins (W)	RSr
P	91	William Bartel (W)	RSr
K	92	Zac Yoakam (W)	Jr
LS	96	Joseph Vinci (W)	Fr
K	98	Mitch Jeter	RSr

Head coach

- Marcus Freeman

Coordinators/assistant coaches

- Deland McCullough – Associate head coach/running backs
- Mike Denbrock – Offensive coordinator/tight ends
- Al Golden – Defensive coordinator
- Marty Biagi – Special teams coordinator/assistant defensive backs
- Gino Guidugli – Quarterbacks/pass game coordinator
- Mike Brown – Wide receivers
- Joe Rudolph – Offensive line
- Al Washington – Defensive line/defensive run game coordinator
- Max Bullough – Linebackers
- Mike Mickens – Defensive backs/defensive pass game coordinator
- Loren Landow – Director of football performance

Legend

- (C) Team captain
- (S) Suspended
- (I) Ineligible
- (W) Walk-on
- Injured
- Redshirt

Roster
Last update: January 20, 2025

=== Depth chart ===
Defense

NB
Jordan Clark
Karson Hobbs
–

FS
Xavier Watts
Rod Heard II
–

WLB	SLB
Jack Kiser	Drayk Bowen
Jaylen Sneed	Kyngstonn Viliamu-Asa
Jaiden Ausberry	–

BS
Adon Shuler
Luke Talich
Kennedy Urlacher

CB
Christian Gray
Karson Hobbs
–

DE	DT	DT	DE
RJ Oben	Howard Cross III	Gabriel Rubio	Joshua Burnham
Bryce Young	Donovan Hinish	Armel Mukam	Junior Tuihalamaka
Joshua Burnham	Sean Sevillano Jr.	–	Loghan Thomas

CB
Leonard Moore
Tae Johnson
–

Offense

WR-X
Jordan Faison
Kris Mitchell
–

WR-F
Jaden Greathouse
Jayden Harrison
–

LT	LG	C	RG	RT
Charles Jagusah	Billy Schrauth	Pat Coogan	Rocco Spindler	Aamil Wagner
Tosh Baker	Sullivan Absher	Sam Pendleton	Sam Pendleton	Guerby Lambert
–	–	Joe Otting	Chris Terek	–

TE
Mitchell Evans
Eli Raridon
–

WR-Z
Beaux Collins
Jayden Thomas
–

QB
Riley Leonard
Steve Angeli
–

Key reserves
QB Kenny Minchey
WR Deion Colzie
TE Kevin Bauman, Davis Sherwood
OL Ty Chan
DL Devan Houstan, Brenan Vernon
LB Preston Zinter
S Ben Minich
Injured Taebron Bennie-Powell (S), Jordan Botelho (DL), Ashton Craig (OL), Cooper Flanagan (TE), Bodie Kahoun (LB), Kahanu Kia (LB), Anthonie Knapp (OL), Rylie Mills (DL), Benjamin Morrison (CB), Jason Onye (DL), Gi'Bran Payne (RB), Styles Prescod (OL), KK Smith (WR), Boubacar Traore (DL), Chance Tucker (CB)

Special teams
PK Mitch Jeter
P James Rendell
KR Jayden Harrison
PR Max Hurleman
LS Rino Monteforte (Field goals, extra points)
Joseph Vinci (Punting)
H Chris Salerno

RB
Jeremiyah Love
Jadarian Price
Aneyas Williams
Devyn Ford
