= Gabriel Rubio =

American football player (born 2003)

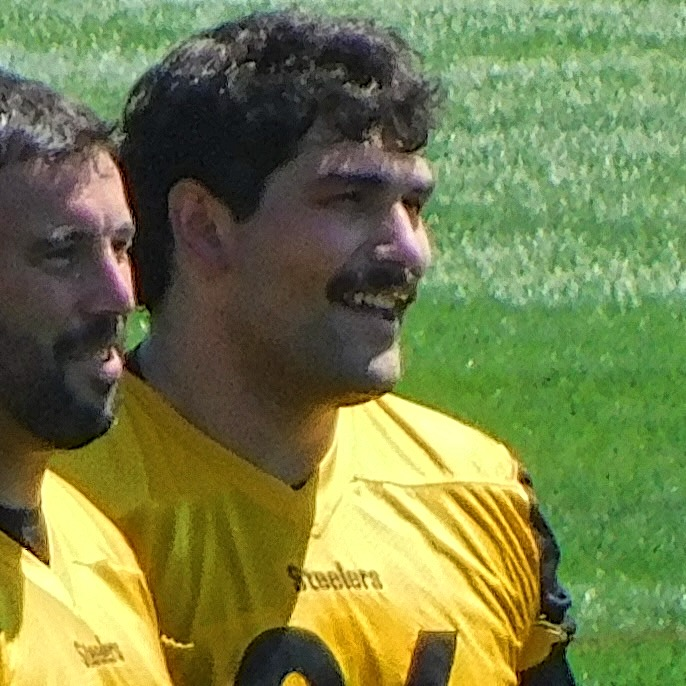
- Rubio with the Pittsburgh Steelers in 2026

No. 96 – Pittsburgh Steelers
- Position: Defensive end
- Roster status: Active

Personal information
- Born: July 9, 2003 (age 23)
- Listed height: 6 ft 5 in (1.96 m)
- Listed weight: 321 lb (146 kg)

Career information
- High school: Lutheran St. Charles (St. Peters, Missouri)
- College: Notre Dame (2021–2025)
- NFL draft: 2026: 6th round, 210th overall pick

Career history
- Pittsburgh Steelers (2026–present)
- Stats at Pro Football Reference

Gabriel Francis Rubio (born July 9, 2003) is an American professional football defensive end for the Pittsburgh Steelers of the National Football League (NFL). He played college football for the Notre Dame Fighting Irish and was selected by the Steelers in the sixth round of the 2026 NFL draft.

== Early life ==
Rubio grew up in St. Louis, Missouri and attended Lutheran High School of St. Charles County, where he emerged as one of the top defensive linemen in the Midwest. He was rated a four-star recruit by 247Sports, Rivals and ESPN, ranking as high as the No. 9 defensive tackle nationally and the No. 2 overall player in Missouri. He recorded 117 tackles, 46 tackles for loss, and 18 sacks as a junior, and earned Second Team All-Missouri honors from MaxPreps in 2019. He committed to play college football for the Notre Dame Fighting Irish.

== College career ==
Rubio made his collegiate debut in the 2022 Fiesta Bowl against Oklahoma State, recording one tackle. In 2022, he appeared as a reserve defensive lineman and goal-line specialist, finishing the season with 17 tackles and 4 tackles for loss, including a career-best seven tackles against Stanford. In 2023, Rubio played in nine games and totaled 11 tackles. He recorded a pass breakup against USC that resulted in an interception, and forced a late fumble at Clemson. Rubio missed the first five games of the 2024 season after fracturing his foot on the first day of preseason camp. He recorded 24 tackles, including 12 solo, and registered his first career sack at USC. Rubio took over for the final three games after starting defensive tackle Rylie Mills tore his ACL, including the Sugar Bowl, Orange Bowl, and National Championship. He was selected to the Hispanic College Football Player of the Year watchlist ahead of the 2025 season. After playing in six games, including five starts, Rubio injured his left elbow, causing him to miss the remainder of the season.

=== Statistics ===
Year	Team	GP	Tackles				Interceptions				Fumbles		
Year	Team	GP	Total	Solo	Ast	Sack	PD	Int	Yds	TD	FF	FR	TD
2021	Notre Dame	1	1	0	1	0.0	0	0	0	0	0	0	0
2022	Notre Dame	12	17	6	11	0.0	0	0	0	0	0	0	0
2023	Notre Dame	9	11	4	7	0.0	1	0	0	0	1	0	0
2024	Notre Dame	11	24	12	12	1.0	1	0	0	0	0	0	0
2025	Notre Dame	6	13	5	8	0.5	1	0	0	0	0	0	0
Career		39	66	27	39	1.5	3	0	0	0	1	0	0

== Professional career ==
Pre-draft measurables
Height	Weight	Arm length	Hand span	Wingspan	40-yard dash	10-yard split	20-yard split	20-yard shuttle	Three-cone drill	Vertical jump	Broad jump	Bench press
6 ft 5 1/8 in (1.96 m)	321 lb (146 kg)	33 5/8 in (0.85 m)	10 in (0.25 m)	6 ft 9 1/4 in (2.06 m)	5.29 s	1.85 s	3.03 s	4.87 s	7.62 s	26.0 in (0.66 m)	8 ft 9 in (2.67 m)	26 reps
All values from Pro Day

Rubio was selected by the Pittsburgh Steelers in the 6th round with the 210th pick of the 2026 NFL draft.

== Personal life ==
Rubio's father Angel was a three-time All-American as a defensive end at Southeast Missouri State. He was drafted by the Pittsburgh Steelers in 1998 and played two seasons in the NFL. He is of Mexican descent.
