= Guerby Lambert =

American football player (born 2005)

No. 76 – Notre Dame Fighting Irish
- Position: Offensive tackle
- Class: Junior

Personal information
- Born: September 18, 2005 (age 21)
- Listed height: 6 ft 7 in (2.01 m)
- Listed weight: 325 lb (147 kg)

Career information
- High school: Catholic Memorial (West Roxbury, Massachusetts)
- College: Notre Dame (2024–present)
- Stats at ESPN

Guerby Lambert (born September 18, 2005) is an American college football offensive tackle for the Notre Dame Fighting Irish.

== Early life ==
Lambert attended Catholic Memorial School in West Roxbury, Massachusetts, a neighborhood in Boston. He was rated as a consensus four-star recruit, top seven offensive tackle, and number one player in Massachusetts, by On3.com, Rivals.com, ESPN, and 247Sports. He was selected to play in the 2024 All-American Bowl. He committed to play college football for the Notre Dame Fighting Irish over Boston College, Ohio State, and Harvard.

== College career ==
Lambert saw little action as a freshman. As a sophomore, he was named the starting right guard ahead of the season after starter Charles Jagusah suffered a season-ending injury, and started every game of the season at the position. Before his junior season, he was one of 68 players named to the preseason watch list for the 2026 Outland Trophy, and switched to be the Fighting Irish's starting right tackle, after the departure of former starter Aamil Wagner.

== Personal life ==
Lambert is of Haitian descent. His first name, Guerby, is a portmanteau of his mother's name, Guerline, and Kirby, the name his father had originally wanted for him. He is currently in a relationship with WNBA guard, and former Notre Dame Fighting Irish, Cassandre Prosper.
