= 2025 Sugar Bowl =

College Football Playoff Quarterfinal bowl game

2025 Allstate Sugar Bowl
- College Football Playoff Quarterfinal; 91st Sugar Bowl
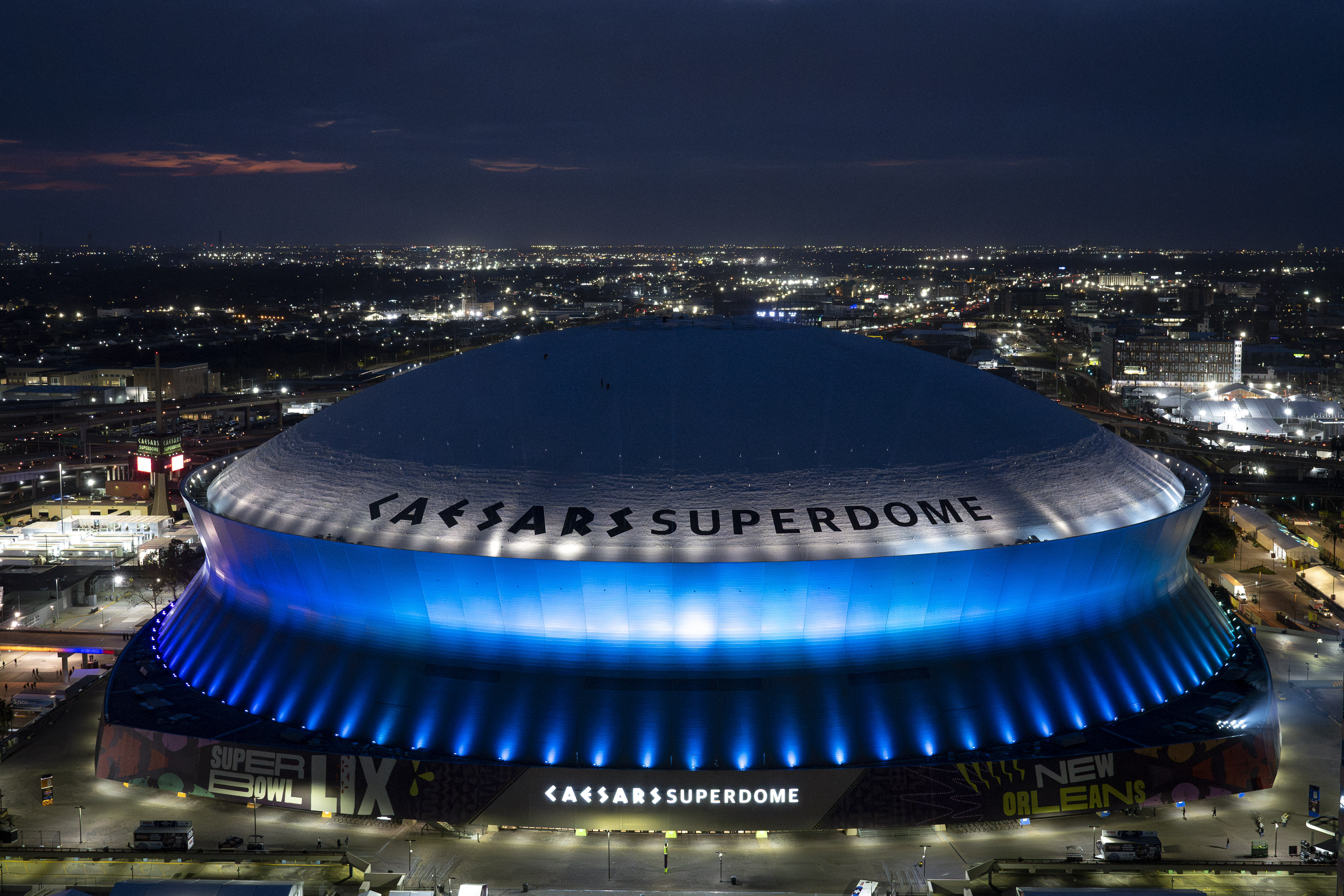
- Caesars Superdome in New Orleans, Louisiana, hosted the Sugar Bowl.
Notre Dame Fighting Irish	Georgia Bulldogs
(12–1)	(11–2)
Independent	SEC
23	10
Head coach: Marcus Freeman	Head coach: Kirby Smart
AP / Coaches / CFP; 3 / 3 / 5	AP / Coaches / CFP; 2 / 2 / 2
	1	2	3	4	Total
Notre Dame	0	13	7	3	23
Georgia	0	3	7	0	10
- Date: January 2, 2025
- Season: 2024
- Stadium: Caesars Superdome
- Location: New Orleans, Louisiana
- MOP: Riley Leonard (QB, Notre Dame); Xavier Watts (S, Notre Dame)
- Favorite: Notre Dame by 1.5
- National anthem: Samyra
- Referee: Michael Vandervelde (Big 12)
- Attendance: 57,267

United States TV coverage
- Network: ESPN
- Announcers: Sean McDonough (play-by-play); Greg McElroy (analyst); Molly McGrath (sideline); Laura Rutledge (sideline)

The 2025 Sugar Bowl (officially known as the College Football Playoff Quarterfinal at the Allstate Sugar Bowl for sponsorship reasons) was a college football bowl game played on January 2, 2025, at Caesars Superdome in New Orleans, Louisiana. The game was the 91st annual playing of the Sugar Bowl and one of the quarterfinals of the 2024–25 College Football Playoff (CFP) concluding the 2024 FBS football season. The game featured two of the twelve teams chosen by the selection committee to participate in the playoff: the No. 7 seed Notre Dame Fighting Irish, an FBS independent, and the No. 2 seed Georgia Bulldogs from the Southeastern Conference (SEC). The winner qualified for the Orange Bowl (one of the CFP semifinals) to be played against the winner of the Fiesta Bowl. The game was originally scheduled to be played on January 1 but was postponed to the following day due to a terrorist attack in the nearby French Quarter early on the morning of New Year's Day.

Notre Dame entered the game with a record of 12–1, while Georgia entered 11–2. The Bulldogs, by virtue of their victory in the SEC Championship and their place among the four highest-ranked conference champions, received a first-round bye in the CFP, making this game their first in the playoff. Notre Dame was ranked No. 5 by the playoff committee in their final rankings and received the No. 7 seed. They defeated No. 10 seed Indiana in the first round, earning them a berth in the quarterfinals. Georgia, playing without starting quarterback Carson Beck due to injury, entered the game as slight underdogs despite their higher seeding.

Notre Dame defeated Georgia by a 23–10 score, winning their first major (New Year's Six) bowl game since the 1994 Cotton Bowl Classic, having lost their 10 most recent such appearances. They advanced to the 2025 Orange Bowl, against Penn State, in the CFP semifinals before falling in the national championship to Ohio State.

== Background ==
The Sugar Bowl was held at Tulane Stadium in New Orleans from its inception in 1935 until 1974; since 1975 it has been held in Caesars Superdome (formerly the Louisiana Superdome and the Mercedes-Benz Superdome). The Sugar Bowl became part of the Bowl Championship Series (BCS) from its first year in 1998 and hosted the BCS National Championship Game in 2000 and 2004. After the establishment of the College Football Playoff (CFP) beginning with the 2014 season, it hosted CFP semifinal games in 2015, 2018, 2021, and 2024 prior to the quarterfinal contest in 2025.

=== College Football Playoff ===
The twelve teams participating in the playoff were chosen by the CFP selection committee, whose final rankings were released on December 8, 2024. This was the first edition of the CFP to feature twelve teams instead of four, and the Sugar Bowl was assigned to host a quarterfinal game. The Georgia Bulldogs, having just defeated Texas in the SEC Championship, were ranked No. 2 and received the No. 2 seed as they were the second-highest-ranked conference champion. By virtue of their top-four seed, they received a first-round bye and qualified directly for the Sugar Bowl quarterfinal. The game's other participant was decided by a first-round game between No. 7 seed Notre Dame and No. 10 seed Indiana, played at Notre Dame Stadium on December 20. Notre Dame defeated Indiana, 27–17, qualifying them for the quarterfinal matchup with Georgia. Georgia entered the game with a 11–2 record, while Notre Dame entered 12–1 following their first-round win.

First round			Sugar Bowl
			2	Georgia	10
10	Indiana	17	7	Notre Dame	23
7	Notre Dame	27

=== Postponement ===
The game was originally scheduled to be held at 7:45 p.m. local CST on January 1, 2025. In the early morning of January 1, a terrorist attack took place on Bourbon Street in New Orleans in which fifteen people were killed. Sugar Bowl officials and law enforcement personnel initially announced that the game would go on as scheduled, but another announcement was made later that afternoon that the game would be postponed to 3:00 p.m. on the following day. Security for the event was tightened and the game ultimately took place without incident.

== Teams ==
This was the fourth meeting between the Bulldogs and the Fighting Irish, following a 2017 and 2019 home-and-home series where Georgia won both games. The two teams had previously met in the postseason once, in the 1981 Sugar Bowl, a 17–10 Georgia win. Though Georgia has won all three previous meetings, each game was decided by seven points or less.

=== Georgia Bulldogs ===
The bowl game was the 12th Sugar Bowl appearance for the Bulldogs with a record of 5–6 in prior editions, with the program's latest appearance being the 2020 game. Georgia entered the game as the SEC champions, with an 11–2 record (6–2 in conference).

Second-string quarterback Gunner Stockton started for the Bulldogs after regular starter Carson Beck injured his throwing elbow in the Bulldogs' overtime SEC Championship victory over Texas and underwent season-ending surgery. Beck eventually declared for the 2025 NFL draft, but later decided to enter the NCAA transfer portal and transfer to Miami.

=== Notre Dame Fighting Irish ===
The bowl game was the fifth Sugar Bowl appearance for the Fighting Irish with a record of 2–2 in prior editions, with the program's latest appearance being the 2007 game. Notre Dame entered the game with a 12–1 record. Their only loss was to Northern Illinois, on September 7.

== Game summary ==
The game's first score came on its fifth drive; each team punted on their first drive, Georgia's second drive ended with a fumble at the Notre Dame 16-yard line, and Notre Dame punted for a second time before Georgia took a 3–0 lead on a 41-yard Peyton Woodring field goal. Notre Dame tied the game with a field goal of their own on their following possession. After one additional Fighting Irish punt and two more from the Bulldogs, Notre Dame took their first lead with 39 seconds until halftime on another successful field goal. On Georgia's next play, RJ Oben sacked Gunner Stockton as he was winding up to throw and Junior Tuihalamaka recovered for Notre Dame, leading to a touchdown pass from Riley Leonard to Beaux Collins and a 13–3 lead for the Fighting Irish at halftime.

Notre Dame extended its lead on the opening kickoff of the second half, which was returned 98 yards for a touchdown by Jayden Harrison, capping a 17-point Irish run in a span of 54 seconds of game time. Georgia punted on 4th & 3 on their next drive, and the Irish went three-and-out in response. The Bulldogs pulled within ten points on a 5-play drive that followed, ending in a 32-yard touchdown pass from Stockton to Cash Jones, but they were unable to score further. They turned the ball over on downs on each of their final two offensive possessions, while Notre Dame added a 47-yard Mitch Jeter field goal in addition to a turnover on downs. Ultimately, the Irish ran out the clock to earn a semifinal berth with a 23–10 victory.

The win not only advanced Notre Dame to the semifinal at the Orange Bowl but also marked the first Fighting Irish victory in a New Year's Six bowl since the 1994 Cotton Bowl Classic against Texas A&M. It also meant that for the first time in College Football Playoff history, the semifinals would be filled by teams seeded outside the top four – on New Year's Eve, Penn State had beaten Boise State in the Fiesta Bowl, while on New Year's Day, Ohio State had beaten Oregon in the Rose Bowl and Texas had beaten Arizona State in the Peach Bowl.

College Football Playoff Quarterfinal at the 2025 Sugar Bowl

Quarter	1	2	3	4	Total
(7) No. 5 Notre Dame	0	13	7	3	23
(2) No. 2 Georgia	0	3	7	0	10

at Caesars Superdome • New Orleans, Louisiana

- Date: Thursday, January 2, 2025
- Game time: 3:11 p.m. CST
- Game weather: Sunny (indoors) • Temperature: 59 °F (15 °C)
- Game attendance: 57,267
- Referee: Michael Vandervelde (Big 12)
- TV announcers (ESPN): Sean McDonough (play-by-play), Greg McElroy (analyst), Molly McGrath and Laura Rutledge (sideline)
- Box score

Scoring summary

Quarter	Time	Drive			Team	Scoring information	Score	
Quarter	Time	Plays	Yards	TOP	Team	Scoring information	Notre Dame	Georgia
2	12:14	5	55	2:00	Georgia	41-yard field goal by Peyton Woodring	0	3
2	8:20	8	49	3:54	Notre Dame	44-yard field goal by Mitch Jeter	3	3
2	0:39	10	32	2:30	Notre Dame	48-yard field goal by Mitch Jeter	6	3
2	0:28	1	13	0:05	Notre Dame	Beaux Collins 13-yard touchdown reception from Riley Leonard, Mitch Jeter kick good	13	3
3	14:45				Notre Dame	Jayden Harrison 98-yard kickoff return for touchdown, Mitch Jeter kick good	20	3
3	9:36	5	63	2:12	Georgia	Cash Jones 32-yard touchdown reception from Gunner Stockton, Peyton Woodring kick good	20	10
4	13:47	8	29	4:18	Notre Dame	47-yard field goal by Mitch Jeter	23	10
"TOP" = time of possession. For other American football terms, see Glossary of American football.							23	10

=== Statistics ===
Team statistical comparison
Statistic	Notre Dame	Georgia
First downs	14	17
First downs rushing	8	5
First downs passing	5	9
First downs penalty	1	3
Third down efficiency	4–14	2–12
Fourth down efficiency	0–1	0–3
Total plays–net yards	61–244	61–296
Rushing attempts–net yards	37–154	29–62
Yards per rush	4.2	2.1
Yards passing	90	234
Pass completions–attempts	15–24	20–32
Interceptions thrown	0	0
Punt returns–total yards	2–11	1–6
Kickoff returns–total yards	1–98	1–19
Punts–average yardage	5–43.4	4–39.8
Fumbles–lost	0–0	3–2
Penalties–yards	10–78	5–41
Time of possession	31:32	28:28

Notre Dame statistics
Fighting Irish passing
	C–A	Yds	TD–INT
Riley Leonard	15–24	90	1–0
Fighting Irish rushing
	Car	Yds	TD
Riley Leonard	14	80	0
Jadarian Price	10	37	0
Jeremiyah Love	6	19	0
Jordan Faison	2	9	0
Jayden Thomas	1	7	0
TEAM	2	−2	0
Fighting Irish receiving
	Rec	Yds	TD
Jordan Faison	4	46	0
Mitchell Evans	3	22	0
Beaux Collins	1	13	1
Jaden Greathouse	2	6	0
Aneyas Williams	2	5	0
Jayden Harrison	1	4	0
Jeremiyah Love	1	2	0
Riley Leonard	1	−8	0

Georgia statistics
Bulldogs passing
	C–A	Yds	TD–INT
Gunner Stockton	20–32	234	1–0
Bulldogs rushing
	Car	Yds	TD
Trevor Etienne	11	38	0
Nate Frazier	4	37	0
Arian Smith	1	13	0
Dillon Bell	1	1	0
Cash Jones	2	−4	0
Gunner Stockton	10	−23	0
Bulldogs receiving
	Rec	Yds	TD
Arian Smith	1	67	0
Cash Jones	2	37	1
Dominic Lovett	3	36	0
Dillon Bell	6	33	0
Trevor Etienne	4	26	0
Oscar Delp	2	18	0
Henry Delp	2	18	0
Nate Frazier	2	17	0

== See also ==
- 2024 New Orleans Bowl, contested at the same venue 2 weeks earlier
