= Kyngstonn Viliamu-Asa =

American football player (born 2006)

No. 27 – Notre Dame Fighting Irish
- Position: Linebacker
- Class: Junior

Personal information
- Born: March 16, 2006 (age 20)
- Listed height: 6 ft 3 in (1.91 m)
- Listed weight: 234 lb (106 kg)

Career information
- High school: St. John Bosco (Bellflower, California)
- College: Notre Dame (2024–present)
- Stats at ESPN

Kyngstonn Saisola Opele Niupulusu Viliamu-Asa (born March 16, 2006), also known by his initials KVA, is an American college football linebacker for the Notre Dame Fighting Irish.

== Early life ==
Viliamu-Asa attended St. John Bosco High School in Bellflower, California. He was a five-star recruit according to Rivals.com.

== College career ==
Viliamu-Asa committed to play college football for the Notre Dame Fighting Irish over offers from Ohio State and USC.

=== College statistics ===
Year	Team	GP	Tackles				Interceptions				Fumbles		
Year	Team	GP	Total	Solo	Ast	Sack	PD	Int	Yds	TD	FF	FR	TD
2024	Notre Dame	14	37	9	28	1.0	1	1	4	0	0	1	0
2025	Notre Dame	11	48	25	23	3.0	2	1	14	0	0	1	0
2026	Notre Dame	2	7	3	4	0.0	0	0	0	0	0	1	0
Career		27	92	37	55	4.0	3	2	18	0	0	3	0
