= Bryant Young =

American football player and coach (born 1972)

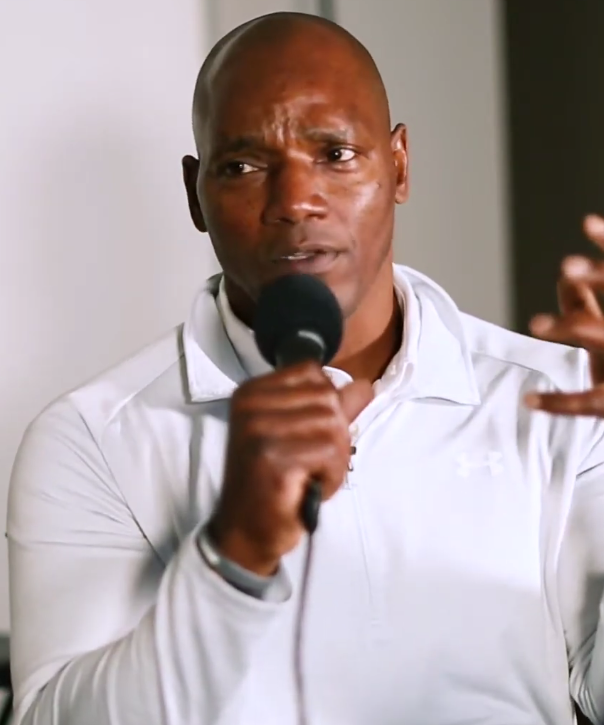
- Young in 2022

No. 97
- Positions: Defensive tackle, defensive end

Personal information
- Born: January 27, 1972 (age 54); Chicago Heights, Illinois, U.S.
- Listed height: 6 ft 3 in (1.91 m)
- Listed weight: 291 lb (132 kg)

Career information
- High school: Bloom (Chicago Heights)
- College: Notre Dame (1989–1993)
- NFL draft: 1994: 1st round, 7th overall pick

Career history

Playing
- San Francisco 49ers (1994–2007)

Coaching
- Notre Dame (2009) Graduate assistant; San José State (2010) Defensive line coach; Florida (2011–2012) Defensive line coach; Atlanta Falcons (2017–2019) Defensive line coach

Awards and highlights
- Super Bowl champion (XXIX); NFL Comeback Player of the Year (1999); 2× First-team All-Pro (1996, 1998); 2× Second-team All-Pro (1999, 2001); 4× Pro Bowl (1996, 1999, 2001, 2002); NFL 1990s All-Decade Team; PFWA NFL All-Rookie Team (1994); George Halas Award (2000); San Francisco 49ers Hall of Fame; First-team All-American (1993); NFL record: Most safeties in a season: 2 (1996; tied)

Career NFL statistics
- Total tackles: 627
- Sacks: 89.5
- Forced fumbles: 12
- Fumble recoveries: 7
- Passes defended: 20
- Stats at Pro Football Reference
- Pro Football Hall of Fame

Bryant Colby Young (born January 27, 1972) is an American former professional football player who was a defensive tackle for the San Francisco 49ers of the National Football League (NFL). He played college football for the Notre Dame Fighting Irish was selected by the 49ers in the first round of the 1994 NFL draft. Young was inducted into the Pro Football Hall of Fame in 2022.

== Early life ==
Young was born in Chicago Heights, Illinois. He attended Bloom High School in Chicago Heights, Illinois, where he excelled in football.

== College career ==
Young was a three-year starter at Notre Dame, lettering all four years from 1990 to 1993. As a senior, he was an All-American selection and had 6.5 sacks and 67 tackles. As a junior, he was an Honorable Mention All-American selection and garnered 7.5 sacks. He graduated from Notre Dame in 1994 with a major in marketing.

== Professional career ==
Pre-draft measurables
Height	Weight	Arm length	Hand span	40-yard dash	10-yard split	20-yard split	20-yard shuttle	Vertical jump	Broad jump	Bench press
6 ft 2 3/4 in (1.90 m)	276 lb (125 kg)	32 in (0.81 m)	9 1/4 in (0.23 m)	4.96 s	1.70 s	2.87 s	4.40 s	28.0 in (0.71 m)	9 ft 1 in (2.77 m)	25 reps
All values from NFL Combine

He was selected by the 49ers in the first round (seventh overall) in the 1994 NFL draft. Young made Honorable Mention All-Pro by The Associated Press in 1995. Young had his finest statistical season in 1996 recording 84 tackles, 11.5 sacks, and two safeties, while earning his first trip to the Pro Bowl. In 1997, although Young's sack total dropped to just four on the season, he was still a dominant presence on the interior line, helping San Francisco finish first overall in the NFL in total defense that season. Despite his drop in statistical production, he was still widely considered by many to be the best all-around DT in the NFL, despite teammate DT Dana Stubblefield being named the NFL Defensive Player of the Year that same season. Young was leading the entire NFL at the DT position in sacks with 9.5 prior to his season-ending injury suffered on a Monday Night match-up against the New York Giants in week 13 of the 1998 season. The injury to Young's leg was so severe that he needed a metal rod to be inserted in the broken leg. Despite Young's devastating injury coming late in the 1998 season, he came back fully recovered in time for the 1999 season and recorded over 70 tackles, 11 sacks and a safety which earned him his second Pro Bowl. Young also received the NFL Comeback Player of the Year Award for his fantastic play that same season. Bryant Young had 89.5 career sacks in his 14-year career with the 49ers, ranking him at 6th all-time in the NFL in career sacks for a player at the DT position, trailing only Trevor Pryce, Henry Thomas, Aaron Donald, and Hall of Famers John Randle, Steve McMichael, and Warren Sapp. He also ranks third on the team's all-time career sacks list placing him behind only DE Tommy Hart and DE Cedric Hardman. Bryant Young also owns the 49ers' franchise record for career safeties, with 3. Young retired after the 2007 season, with the distinction of being the last active member of the Super Bowl team.

Young is a member of the NFL's All-Decade Team of the 1990s. Young became eligible for the Pro Football Hall of Fame in 2013. Young advanced to the semi-finalist stage in Hall of Fame voting in 2020. He was eventually elected to the Hall in 2022.

He is also an 8-time recipient of the 49ers' annual Len Eshmont Award, which is the team's most prestigious award and is given to the Niners player who best exemplifies the "inspirational and courageous play" of its namesake. No other recipient has won the award at least thrice.

== NFL career statistics ==
Legend
	Won the Super Bowl
**Bold**	Career high

Year	Team	GP	Tackles				Fumbles			Interceptions					
Year	Team	GP	Comb	Solo	Ast	Sacks	FF	FR	Yds	Int	Yds	Avg	Lng	TD	PD
1994	SF	**16**	44	42	2	6.0	0	**1**	0	0	0	0	0	0	1
1995	SF	12	28	25	3	6.0	0	**1**	0	0	0	0	0	0	2
1996	SF	**16**	**75**	**60**	**15**	**11.5**	1	**1**	0	0	0	0	0	0	**4**
1997	SF	12	45	39	6	4.0	1	0	0	0	0	0	0	0	2
1998	SF	12	53	42	11	9.5	**2**	**1**	0	0	0	0	0	0	2
1999	SF	**16**	40	36	4	11.0	0	0	0	0	0	0	0	0	**4**
2000	SF	15	44	32	12	9.5	1	**1**	0	0	0	0	0	0	3
2001	SF	**16**	37	31	6	3.5	1	0	0	0	0	0	0	0	0
2002	SF	**16**	35	28	7	2.0	0	0	0	0	0	0	0	0	0
2003	SF	**16**	35	29	6	3.5	1	0	0	0	0	0	0	0	**4**
2004	SF	**16**	46	36	10	3.0	1	**1**	0	0	0	0	0	0	1
2005	SF	13	36	32	4	8.0	**2**	0	0	0	0	0	0	0	2
2006	SF	**16**	52	41	11	5.5	0	0	0	0	0	0	0	0	2
2007	SF	**16**	35	31	4	6.5	1	0	0	0	0	0	0	0	2
Career		208	605	504	101	89.5	11	6	0	0	0	0	0	0	29

== Coaching career ==
On January 21, 2010, Young was hired as the defensive line coach at San Jose State University.

On January 14, 2011, Young was hired as the defensive line coach at the University of Florida.

He later re-joined defensive coordinator Dan Quinn, his former position coach with the 49ers, when he was hired as the defensive line coach for the Atlanta Falcons on February 8, 2017. He spent two seasons (2017–18) in that capacity before he resigned to spend more time with his family.

== Personal life ==
Young is a Christian. Young is married to Kristin M. Young. They have six children. His son Bryce, plays college football at Notre Dame.
