= Bryce Young (defensive end) =

American football player

No. 95 – Notre Dame Fighting Irish
- Position: Defensive end
- Class: Junior

Personal information
- Listed height: 6 ft 6 in (1.98 m)
- Listed weight: 260 lb (118 kg)

Career information
- High school: Charlotte Christian (Charlotte, North Carolina)
- College: Notre Dame (2024–present)
- Stats at ESPN

Bryce Caiden Young is an American college football defensive end for the Notre Dame Fighting Irish.

== Early life ==
Young attended Charlotte Christian School in Charlotte, North Carolina. During his high school career he had 191 tackles and 17 sacks. Rated as a five-star recruit by 247Sports, Young committed to the University of Notre Dame to play college football.

== College career ==
Young played in all 16 games his true freshman year at Notre Dame in 2024. He finished the season with 23 tackles, 1.5 sacks and also blocked three kicks.

=== College statistics ===
Year	Team	GP	Tackles				Interceptions				Fumbles		
Year	Team	GP	Total	Solo	Ast	Sack	PD	Int	Yds	TD	FF	FR	TD
2024	Notre Dame	16	23	14	9	1.5	0	0	0	0	0	0	0
2025	Notre Dame	12	20	10	10	2.0	3	0	0	0	0	0	0
2026	Notre Dame	3	10	7	3	1.0	0	0	0	0	0	0	0
Career		31	53	31	22	4.5	3	0	0	0	0	0	0

== Personal life ==
He is the son of Pro Football Hall of Fame defensive tackle Bryant Young.
