= Jaden Greathouse =

American football player (born 2004)

- Greathouse in 2026

No. 1 – Notre Dame Fighting Irish
- Position: Wide receiver
- Class: Senior

Personal information
- Born: October 29, 2004 (age 22)
- Listed height: 6 ft 1 in (1.85 m)
- Listed weight: 212 lb (96 kg)

Career information
- High school: Westlake (Austin, Texas)
- College: Notre Dame (2023–present)
- Stats at ESPN

Jaden Marcus Greathouse (born October 29, 2004) is an American college football wide receiver for the Notre Dame Fighting Irish.

== Early life ==
Greathouse attended Westlake High School in Austin, Texas. A multi-sport athlete, Greathouse also played basketball with Westlake in addition to football. As a freshman, he recorded 47 receptions for 715 yards and ten touchdowns as a varsity starter. As a junior, Greathouse tallied 66 receptions for 1,274 yards and 20 touchdowns, helping lead Westlake to their third consecutive state championship. He followed that up with an additional 915 yards receiving as a senior. A four-star recruit, Greathouse committed to play college football at the University of Notre Dame over offers from Texas, Oklahoma, and South Carolina.

== College career ==
In his collegiate debut against Navy, Greathouse hauled in three receptions for 68 yards and two touchdowns. Despite dealing with a lingering hamstring injury throughout his freshman season, Greathouse finished the year totaling 18 receptions for 265 yards and five touchdowns. The following season in the 2025 Orange Bowl against Penn State, he recorded seven catches for 105 yards and a touchdown, a 54-yard pass from Riley Leonard, and an amazing ankle-breaking move brought the score to 24-24. A 41-yard field goal from kicker Mitch Jeter led them to a 27–24 victory. In the 2025 College Football Playoff National Championship, Greathouse tallied six receptions for 128 yards and two touchdowns in a 23–34 loss to Ohio State.

=== Statistics ===
Year	Team	GP	Receiving			
Year	Team	GP	Rec	Yds	Avg	TD
2023	Notre Dame	12	18	265	14.7	5
2024	Notre Dame	16	42	592	14.1	4
2025	Notre Dame	4	4	73	18.3	0
2026	Notre Dame	3	4	54	13.5	0
Career		35	68	984	14.5	9
