= Jayden Harrison =

American football player (born c.2001)

Profile
- Positions: Wide receiver, return specialist

Personal information
- Born: March 23, 2001 (age 25); Pontiac, Michigan, U.S.
- Listed height: 5 ft 10 in (1.78 m)
- Listed weight: 198 lb (90 kg)

Career information
- High school: Pearl-Cohn (Nashville, Tennessee)
- College: Vanderbilt (2019–2020); Marshall (2021–2023); Notre Dame (2024)
- NFL draft: 2025: undrafted

Career history
- Winnipeg Blue Bombers (2026)*
- * Offseason or practice squad member only

Awards and highlights
- First-team All-American (2023); First-team All-Sun Belt (2023)

Jayden Devon Harrison (born March 23, 2001) is an American professional football wide receiver and return specialist. He played college football for the Vanderbilt Commodores, Marshall Thundering Herd, and Notre Dame Fighting Irish.

== Early life ==
Jayden Harrison was born in Pontiac, Michigan. He attended Pearl-Cohn High School in Nashville, Tennessee. Harrison was an all-city selection in his sophomore and junior years, and as a senior, he was named a third-team all-midstate football player. Additionally, as a senior, Harrison was named as a finalist for the William E. Hume Award, which is given to the high schooler in the metro-Nashville area who exhibits the best character and performance as a football player. Harrison, a consensus three-star recruit, committed to play for Vanderbilt University over Kentucky, Missouri, Mississippi State, and Tennessee. Harrison cited Vanderbilt's coaches, academic reputation, and proximity to his hometown as his reasons for committing to Vanderbilt. Harrison was part of The Tennessean's 2018 edition of the "Dandy Dozen," a group of the top collegiate prospects in the Nashville area.

== College career ==
=== Vanderbilt ===
Harrison did not play in any games for Vanderbilt his freshman year. In 2020, Harrison played in all nine games during the shortened season, having eight catches for 20 yards, along with nine kickoff returns for 141 yards.

=== Marshall ===
After the 2020 season, Harrison would transfer to Marshall University, where he would continue playing football. In week 10 against Florida Atlantic, Harrison returned the opening kickoff 99 yards for a touchdown, being named Conference USA Special Teams Player of the Week as a result. In 2022, Harrison's performance decreased, with him registering fewer receiving and kickoff return yards than the previous year. In 2023, however, Harrison put up his best statistics while at Marshall. Against James Madison in week 8, Harrison returned a 94-yard kickoff for a touchdown. In week 11, Harrison returned the opening kickoff for 98 yards and a touchdown in a win against Georgia Southern, for which he was named the Sun Belt Conference Special Teams Player of the Week. Harrison also registered his best game as a receiver at the end of the season, having 6 receptions with 132 yards in a loss in the 2023 Frisco Bowl. Following the season, Harrison was named as a finalist for the Jet Award, and a member of both the first-team All-SBC football team and first-team All-America team. Harrison finished his career at Marshall with 62 receptions for 758 yards and four touchdowns, along with three kick-offs returned as touchdowns.

=== Notre Dame ===
Before the 2024 season, Harrison transferred to the University of Notre Dame to play his final season of college football. Soon after transferring, Harrison battled a plantar fasciitis strain, causing him to miss spring practices. Harrison started off his final season slowly, with few contributions as a receiver and a returner. Against Virginia, Harrison recorded 3 catches for 41 yards and his first touchdown as a receiver at Notre Dame. In the 2025 Sugar Bowl, Harrison returned a kick for a 98-yard touchdown, helping in securing a win against Georgia. In his sole season at Notre Dame, Harrison had 19 receptions for 211 yards with one receiving and returning touchdown.

=== Statistics ===
Legend
**Bold**	Career high

Year	Team	Games		Receiving				Rushing				Kick returns			
Year	Team	GP	GS	Rec	Yds	Avg	TD	Att	Yds	Avg	TD	Ret	Yds	Avg	TD
2019	Vanderbilt	0	0	DNP											
2020	Vanderbilt	9	1	8	20	2.5	0	**1**	**16**	**16.0**	0	7	141	20.1	0
2021	Marshall	13	3	23	254	11.0	**2**	0	0	0.0	0	15	378	25.2	1
2022	Marshall	12	0	12	95	7.9	1	**1**	–4	–4.0	0	15	298	19.9	0
2023	Marshall	13	**4**	**28**	**410**	**14.6**	1	**1**	8	8.0	0	**23**	**705**	**30.7**	**2**
2024	Notre Dame	**16**	2	19	211	11.1	1	0	0	0.0	0	12	320	26.7	1
FBS career		63	10	90	990	11.0	5	3	20	6.7	0	72	1,842	25.6	4

== Professional career ==
On May 1, 2026, Harrison signed with the Winnipeg Blue Bombers of the Canadian Football League (CFL). On May 31, he was released as part of final roster cuts.
