= Charles Jagusah =

American football player (born 2004)

No. 56 – Notre Dame Fighting Irish
- Position: Guard
- Class: Senior

Personal information
- Born: June 6, 2004 (age 22)
- Listed height: 6 ft 5 in (1.96 m)
- Listed weight: 330 lb (150 kg)

Career information
- High school: Alleman (Rock Island, Illinois)
- College: Notre Dame (2023–present)
- Stats at ESPN

Charles Ahile Jagusah (born June 6, 2004) is an American college football guard for the Notre Dame Fighting Irish.

== Early life ==
Jagusah attended Alleman High School in Rock Island, Illinois where played football and wrestled, finishing with a 41–0 record and a state title as a junior. During his high school football career, Jagusah was a consensus four-star recruit and was selected for the 2023 All-American Bowl. He committed to play college football for the Notre Dame Fighting Irish.

== College career ==
Jagusah played in two games in his freshman season, starting at left tackle in the 2023 Sun Bowl. He missed his entire sophomore regular season after tearing his right pectoral muscle during a preseason practice. He returned to play on special teams in the Sugar Bowl, before taking over at left tackle in the Orange Bowl after starter Anthonie Knapp left due to injury. He started at left tackle in the CFP National Championship. Before his junior season, Jagusah fractured his left humerus bone in a UTV accident, causing him to miss the entire 2025 season and the first 10 games of the 2026 season.
