= Beaux Collins =

American football player (born 2002)

No. 88 – Atlanta Falcons
- Position: Wide receiver
- Roster status: Active

Personal information
- Born: December 16, 2002 (age 23); Los Angeles, California, U.S.
- Listed height: 6 ft 3 in (1.91 m)
- Listed weight: 206 lb (93 kg)

Career information
- High school: St. John Bosco (Bellflower, California)
- College: Clemson (2021–2023); Notre Dame (2024)
- NFL draft: 2025: undrafted

Career history
- New York Giants (2025); Atlanta Falcons (2026–present)

Career NFL statistics as of 2025
- Receptions: 2
- Receiving yards: 25
- Stats at Pro Football Reference

Carrington Beaux Collins (born December 16, 2002) is an American professional football wide receiver for the Atlanta Falcons of the National Football League (NFL). He played college football for the Clemson Tigers and Notre Dame Fighting Irish.

== Early life ==
Collins attended St. John Bosco High School in Bellflower, California. At St. John Bosco, he was teammates with future Clemson Tigers quarterback DJ Uiagalelei. As a junior, Collins recorded 41 catches for 1,008 yards and 14 touchdowns. A four-star recruit, Collins committed to play college football at Clemson University, enrolling early.

== College career ==
=== Clemson ===
Collins started his first career game against Pitt. He finished the season with 31 receptions for 407 yards and three touchdowns. During his sophomore season, Collins tallied 20 catches and 308 yards while leading the team in touchdown receptions with five. He would suffer a season ending shoulder injury against South Carolina. The following season, Collins caught 38 receptions for 510 yards and three touchdowns. On November 30, 2023, Collins entered the transfer portal.

=== Notre Dame ===
On December 10, 2023, Collins announced that he would transfer to the University of Notre Dame to play for the Notre Dame Fighting Irish.

=== College statistics ===
Year	Team	GP	Receiving			
Year	Team	GP	Rec	Yds	Avg	TD
2021	Clemson	11	31	407	13.1	3
2022	Clemson	10	22	373	17.0	5
2023	Clemson	11	38	510	13.4	3
2024	Notre Dame	16	41	490	12.0	3
Career		48	132	1,780	13.5	14

== Professional career ==
Pre-draft measurables
Height	Weight	Arm length	Hand span	Wingspan	40-yard dash	10-yard split	20-yard split	20-yard shuttle	Three-cone drill	Vertical jump	Broad jump
6 ft 3 in (1.91 m)	201 lb (91 kg)	31 5/8 in (0.80 m)	9 1/2 in (0.24 m)	6 ft 7 1/2 in (2.02 m)	4.52 s	1.59 s	2.57 s	4.19 s	7.13 s	38.0 in (0.97 m)	10 ft 10 in (3.30 m)
All values from NFL Combine/Pro Day

=== New York Giants ===
On May 9, 2025, Collins signed with the New York Giants as an undrafted free agent after going unselected in the 2025 NFL draft. On August 26, the Giants announced that Collins made the 53-man roster, the only undrafted free agent to make the team. He was placed on injured reserve on November 8, due to a neck injury suffered in Week 9 against the San Francisco 49ers.

On August 14, 2026, Collins was waived by New York with an injury settlement.

=== Atlanta Falcons ===
On August 17, 2026, Collins signed with the Atlanta Falcons. He was placed on injured reserve due to a neck injury on August 30. He was activated on November 7.
