= Anthonie Knapp =

American football player

No. 54 – Notre Dame Fighting Irish
- Position: Guard
- Class: Junior

Personal information
- Listed height: 6 ft 5 in (1.96 m)
- Listed weight: 305 lb (138 kg)

Career information
- High school: Roswell (Roswell, Georgia)
- College: Notre Dame (2024–present)

Awards and highlights
- Freshman All-American (2024)
- Stats at ESPN

Anthonie Knapp is an American college football guard for the Notre Dame Fighting Irish.

== Early life ==
Knapp attended Roswell High School in Roswell, Georgia. He was rated as a three-star recruit and the 41st overall offensive tackle in his class and committed to play college football for the Notre Dame Fighting Irish over offers from schools such as Penn State, Virginia Tech, Georgia Tech, North Carolina, Duke, Missouri and Louisville.

== College career ==
Knapp was named the Fighting Irish's starting left tackle ahead of his freshman season in 2024 after starter Charles Jagusah suffered a season-ending injury. Knapp was also named to the preseason freshman all-American team. In the 2025 Orange Bowl, Knapp exited the game in the second quarter with an injury. After starting every game for the Fighting Irish in 2024, Knapp was named a freshman all-American.
