= RJ Oben =

American football defensive end (born 2001)

Profile
- Position: Defensive end

Personal information
- Born: June 17, 2001 (age 25); Cleveland, Ohio, U.S.
- Listed height: 6 ft 3 in (1.91 m)
- Listed weight: 251 lb (114 kg)

Career information
- High school: St. Peter's Prep (Jersey City, New Jersey)
- College: Duke (2019–2023); Notre Dame (2024)
- NFL draft: 2025: undrafted

Career history
- Louisville Kings (2026)

Roman "RJ" Oben Jr. (born June 17, 2001) is an American professional football defensive end. He played college football for the Duke Blue Devils and Notre Dame Fighting Irish.

== Early life ==
Raised in Montclair, New Jersey, Oben attended St. Peter's Preparatory School. Coming out of high school, he was rated as a three-star recruit and committed to play college football for the Duke Blue Devils.

== College career ==
=== Duke ===
As a freshman in 2019, Oben played in four games, making just one tackle before suffering a season-ending shoulder injury. In 2020, he made four tackles with half a tackle being for a loss. In 2021, Oben totaled 25 tackles, with seven going for a loss, five sacks, three forced fumbles, an interception, and a pass breakup. In 2022, he notched 20 tackles with six and a half being for a loss, four and a half sacks, and two forced fumbles. In 2023, Oben tallied 17 tackles, with six going for a loss, and five sacks. After the season, he entered the NCAA transfer portal.

In Oben's career with the Blue Devils, he recorded 67 tackles with 20 being for a loss, 14 sacks, five forced fumbles, and an interception.

=== Notre Dame ===
Oben transferred to play for the Notre Dame Fighting Irish.

=== College statistics ===
Year	Team	Games		Tackles				Interceptions				Fumbles		
Year	Team	GP	GS	Total	Solo	Ast	Sack	PD	Int	Yds	TD	FF	FR	TD
2019	Duke	4	0	1	0	1	0.0	0	0	0	0	0	0	0
2020	Duke	9	0	4	1	3	0.0	0	0	0	0	0	0	0
2021	Duke	12	10	25	14	11	5.0	0	1	8	0	3	0	0
2022	Duke	13	12	20	11	9	4.5	0	0	0	0	2	0	0
2023	Duke	12	11	17	7	10	5.0	1	0	0	0	0	0	0
2024	Notre Dame	16	14	19	10	9	1.0	0	0	0	0	1	0	0
Career		66	47	86	43	43	15.5	1	1	8	0	6	0	0

== Professional career ==
Pre-draft measurables
Height	Weight	Arm length	Hand span	40-yard dash	20-yard shuttle	Three-cone drill	Vertical jump	Broad jump	Bench press
6 ft 3 3/8 in (1.91 m)	251 lb (114 kg)	33 5/8 in (0.85 m)	9 1/4 in (0.23 m)	4.93 s	4.60 s	6.95 s	32.5 in (0.83 m)	9 ft 6 in (2.90 m)	26 reps
All values from Pro Day

On January 14, 2026, Oben was selected by the Louisville Kings of the United Football League (UFL). He was released on April 28.

== Personal life ==
RJ is short for 'Roman Junior' and is the son of former NFL offensive tackle Roman Oben.
