= Rylie Mills =

American football player (born 2001)

No. 98 – Seattle Seahawks
- Position: Defensive tackle
- Roster status: Active

Personal information
- Born: August 20, 2001 (age 25); Lake Bluff, Illinois, U.S.
- Listed height: 6 ft 5 in (1.96 m)
- Listed weight: 296 lb (134 kg)

Career information
- High school: Lake Forest (Lake Forest, Illinois)
- College: Notre Dame (2020–2024)
- NFL draft: 2025: 5th round, 142nd overall pick

Career history
- Seattle Seahawks (2025–present)

Awards and highlights
- Super Bowl champion (LX); Second-team All-American (2024)

Career NFL statistics as of Week 7, 2026
- Total tackles: 9
- Stats at Pro Football Reference

Rylie Mills (born August 20, 2001) is an American professional football defensive tackle for the Seattle Seahawks of the National Football League (NFL). He played college football for the Notre Dame Fighting Irish and was selected by the Seahawks in the fifth round of the 2025 NFL draft.

== Early life ==
Mills attended Lake Forest High School in Lake Forest, Illinois where he also competed in the shot put and discus. He committed to the University of Notre Dame to play college football and enrolled early beginning in the spring semester of 2020.

During Notre Dame's 27-17 win over Indiana during the first round of the 2024 College Football Playoff, Mills suffered a torn ACL while sacking Indiana quarterback Kurtis Rourke. Although Notre Dame head coach Marcus Freeman initially said there was "optimism" Mills could have returned for the team's next game against Georgia, he was ruled out of the rest of the season on December 23.

== College career ==
As a true freshman at Notre Dame in 2020, Mills played in 9 games and made his first start in the 2021 Rose Bowl against Alabama. He played in all 13 games in 2022 and recorded 24 total tackles throughout the season.

=== Statistics ===
Year	Team	Games		Tackles				Interceptions				Fumbles		
Year	Team	GP	GS	Total	Solo	Ast	Sack	PD	Int	Yds	TD	FF	FR	TD
2020	Notre Dame	10	1	7	2	5	0.5	0	0	0	0	0	0	0
2021	Notre Dame	13	0	16	8	8	3.0	0	0	0	0	0	0	0
2022	Notre Dame	13	9	24	8	16	3.5	0	0	0	0	0	0	0
2023	Notre Dame	13	13	47	22	25	2.5	0	0	0	0	0	2	0
2024	Notre Dame	13	13	37	19	18	7.5	0	0	0	0	0	0	0
Career		62	36	131	59	72	17.0	0	0	0	0	0	2	0

== Professional career ==
Pre-draft measurables
Height	Weight	Arm length	Hand span	Wingspan
6 ft 5 3/8 in (1.97 m)	291 lb (132 kg)	32 5/8 in (0.83 m)	9 7/8 in (0.25 m)	6 ft 7 3/4 in (2.03 m)
All values from NFL Combine

Mills was selected by the Seattle Seahawks with the 142nd pick in the fifth round of the 2025 NFL draft. On July 15, Mills was among six Seahawks rookies placed on the non-football injury list following his ACL tear at Notre Dame. He was activated from the list on December 13. He made his NFL debut the next day, playing seven snaps in Seattle's 18-16 win over the Indianapolis Colts. He recorded his first career sack during the second quarter of Super Bowl LX on February 8, 2026, when he pushed New England Patriots guard Jared Wilson into quarterback Drake Maye.
