= Riley Leonard =

American football player (born 2002)

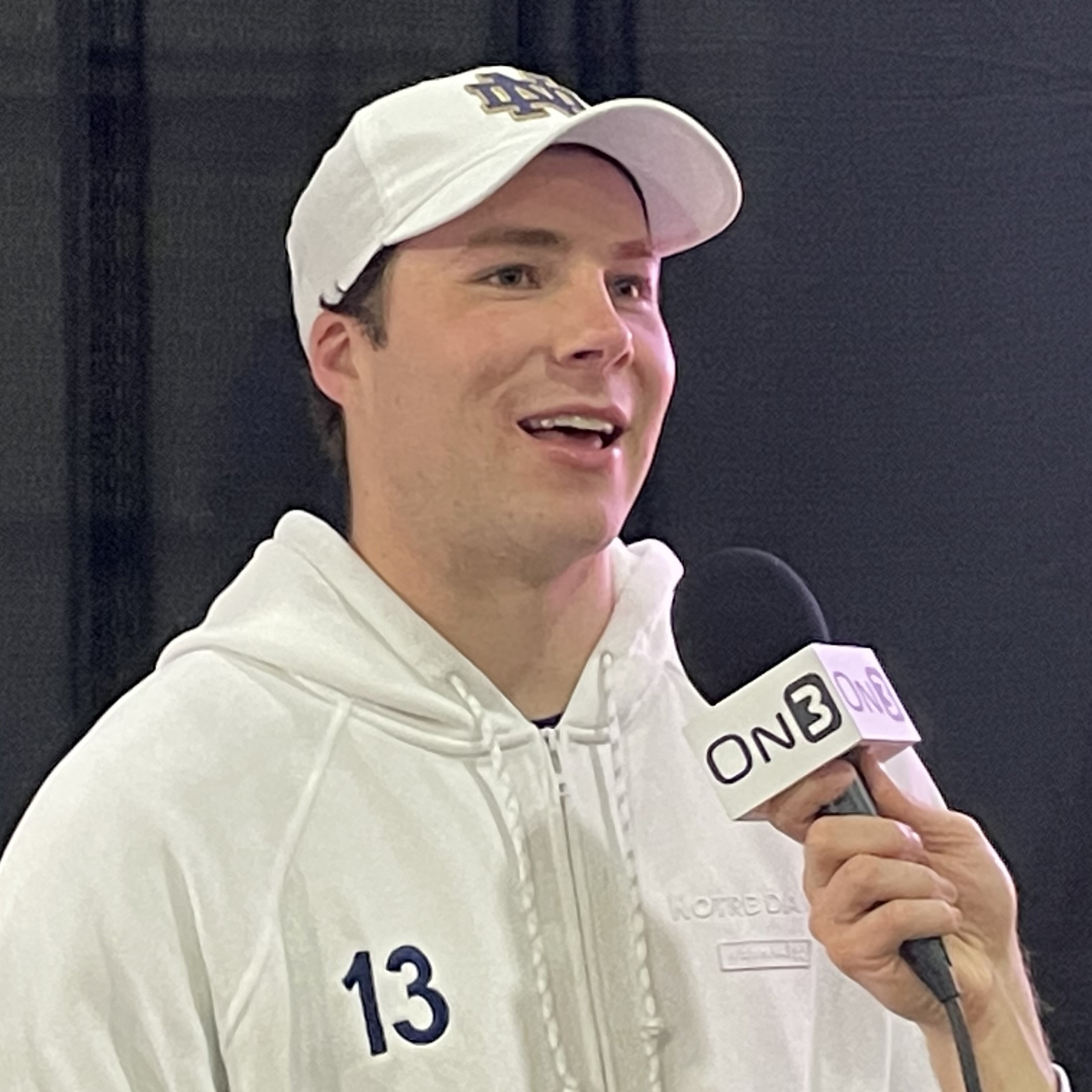
- Leonard in 2025

No. 15 – Indianapolis Colts
- Position: Quarterback
- Roster status: Active

Personal information
- Born: September 13, 2002 (age 24); Mount Pleasant, South Carolina, U.S.
- Listed height: 6 ft 4 in (1.93 m)
- Listed weight: 213 lb (97 kg)

Career information
- High school: Fairhope (Fairhope, Alabama)
- College: Duke (2021–2023); Notre Dame (2024)
- NFL draft: 2025: 6th round, 189th overall pick

Career history
- Indianapolis Colts (2025–present)

Career NFL statistics as of 2025
- Passing attempts: 67
- Passing completions: 39
- Completion percentage: 58.2%
- TD–INT: 2–3
- Passing yards: 415
- Passer rating: 67.7
- Rushing yards: 27
- Rushing touchdowns: 2
- Stats at Pro Football Reference

Riley James Leonard (born September 13, 2002) is an American professional football quarterback for the Indianapolis Colts of the National Football League (NFL). He played college football for the Duke Blue Devils and Notre Dame Fighting Irish. Leonard was selected by the Colts in the sixth round of the 2025 NFL draft.

== Early life ==
Leonard was born in Mount Pleasant, South Carolina and moved to Fairhope, Alabama when he was in kindergarten. Leonard attended Fairhope High School where he played football and basketball. As a senior, he passed for 1,900 yards and 25 touchdowns and had 500 rushing yards. He committed to Duke University to play college football, but also received offers to play college football from Nebraska, Syracuse, and Tulane, among others. Leonard also played basketball in high school, receiving offers to play college basketball from programs like Saint Mary's, North Alabama, Samford and Missouri State.

== College career ==
Leonard played in seven games and made one start as a true freshman at Duke in 2021. For the season, he completed 37 of 62 passes for 381 yards with one touchdown and one interception. Leonard was named the starting quarterback entering his sophomore season in 2022. On November 29, 2023, Leonard announced he would be entering the transfer portal. On December 12, 2023, Leonard announced he would be transferring to Notre Dame. In his only season with the Irish, he led the Irish to an 11–1 record and a berth in the new 12-team College Football Playoff after a stunning upset loss to Northern Illinois in week 2. The Irish finished the regular season #5 in the AP Poll and clinched the 5th seed in the College Football Playoff pole. In the first round, Notre Dame defeated Indiana at Notre Dame Stadium, which was followed by wins over Georgia in the Sugar Bowl and Penn State in the Orange Bowl, which sent Notre Dame to the National Championship Game for the first time since 2012. In the National Championship Game, the Irish lost to Ohio State, 34–23, ending the season as national runner-up and a #2 final ranking in the AP Poll and Coaches Poll, the highest finish for Notre Dame since 1993. The Irish finished the season with 7 wins over ranked teams, the most in a single season in school history, and finished 7–1 against ranked teams, with their only loss being in the National Championship Game. Notre Dame finished with an overall record of 14–2, the most wins in a single season in school history.

=== Statistics ===
Season	Team	Games			Passing								Rushing			
Season	Team	GP	GS	Record	Cmp	Att	Pct	Yds	Avg	TD	Int	Rtg	Att	Yds	Avg	TD
2021	Duke	7	1	0–1	37	62	59.7	381	6.1	1	1	113.4	47	173	3.7	2
2022	Duke	13	13	9–4	250	392	63.8	2,967	7.6	20	6	141.1	124	699	5.6	13
2023	Duke	7	7	4–3	95	165	57.6	1,102	6.7	3	3	116.0	58	352	6.1	4
2024	Notre Dame	16	16	14–2	269	403	66.7	2,861	7.1	21	8	139.6	184	906	4.9	17
Career		43	37	27–10	651	1,022	63.7	7,311	7.2	45	18	134.8	413	2,130	5.2	36

== Professional career ==
Pre-draft measurables
Height	Weight	Arm length	Hand span	Wingspan
6 ft 3 3/4 in (1.92 m)	216 lb (98 kg)	31 5/8 in (0.80 m)	9 1/2 in (0.24 m)	6 ft 5 1/8 in (1.96 m)
All values from NFL Combine

Leonard was selected in the sixth round of the 2025 NFL draft by the Indianapolis Colts with the 189th pick. He signed a four-year contract with the Colts on May 9, 2025. Leonard started the season as the third string quarterback, behind Daniel Jones and Anthony Richardson. He was then promoted to the primary backup in Week 6 when Richardson sustained an orbital fracture while warming up for a matchup against the Arizona Cardinals. Leonard made his NFL debut in Week 8 against the Tennessee Titans, completing neither of his two passes and rushing once for one yard. During a Week 14 game against division rival Jacksonville Jaguars, Leonard entered the game after Jones suffered an Achilles tendon injury in the second quarter. Leonard remained in the game, completing 18-of-29 passes for 145 yards as well as one interception. He also ran twice for five yards and scored his first NFL touchdown. After Jones' season-ending injury, the Colts signed Philip Rivers out of retirement and announced he would start the next game against the Seattle Seahawks in an attempt to keep up their playoff hopes, indicating Leonard would remain as the backup. Following a Week 17 loss to the Jaguars, and elimination from playoff contention, the Colts announced that Leonard would start over Rivers for the season finale. Against the Houston Texans, Leonard completed 21-of-34 passes for 270 yards, throwing two touchdowns and one interception. He also ran three times for 21 yards and one touchdown.

== NFL career statistics ==
Year	Team	Games			Passing									Rushing					Sacks		Fumbles	
Year	Team	GP	GS	Record	Cmp	Att	Pct	Yds	Y/A	Lng	TD	Int	Rtg	Att	Yds	Y/A	Lng	TD	Sck	Yds	Fum	Lost
2025	IND	5	1	0–1	39	67	58.2	415	6.2	66	2	3	67.7	6	27	4.5	11	2	2	17	2	2
Career		5	1	0–1	39	67	58.2	415	6.2	66	2	3	66.7	6	27	4.5	11	2	2	17	2	2

== Personal life ==
Leonard is a Christian. He proposed to his high school sweetheart, Molly Walding, on July 10, 2025. The couple were married on March 28, 2026, in Fairhope, Alabama.
