= Aamil Wagner =

American football player (born 2003)

DC Defenders
- Position: Offensive tackle
- Roster status: Unsigned draft pick

Personal information
- Born: October 7, 2003 (age 23); Yellow Springs, Ohio, U.S.
- Listed height: 6 ft 6 in (1.98 m)
- Listed weight: 306 lb (139 kg)

Career information
- High school: Wayne (Huber Heights, Ohio)
- College: Notre Dame (2022–2025)
- NFL draft: 2026: undrafted

Career history
- Tennessee Titans (2026)*; DC Defenders (2027-present)
- * Offseason or practice squad member only
- Stats at Pro Football Reference

Aamil S. Wagner (born October 7, 2003) is an American professional football offensive tackle. He played college football for the Notre Dame Fighting Irish. He signed with the Tennessee Titans as an undrafted free agent in 2026.

== Early life ==
Wagner attended Wayne High School in Huber Heights, Ohio, where future head coach Marcus Freeman also attended. During his high school career, Wagner was a two-time First Team All-State Selection, two-time First Team All-Greater Western Ohio Conference Selection, and an Adidas All American. In his senior year, he was named a four-star recruit by 247Sports, Rivals and ESPN.com and committed to play college football for the Notre Dame Fighting Irish.

== College career ==
Wagner did not play as a true freshman in 2022, and only played sparingly as a redshirt freshman in 2023. He entered the 2024 season weighing 290 pounds after gaining 30 pounds since arriving on campus. He started every game of the 2024 and 2025 seasons at right tackle.

== Professional career ==
Pre-draft measurables
Height	Weight	Arm length	Hand span	Wingspan	40-yard dash	10-yard split	20-yard split	20-yard shuttle	Three-cone drill	Vertical jump	Broad jump	Bench press
6 ft 5 7/8 in (1.98 m)	306 lb (139 kg)	34 1/2 in (0.88 m)	10 1/4 in (0.26 m)	6 ft 11 5/8 in (2.12 m)	5.01 s	1.79 s	2.93 s	4.88 s	8.02 s	29.5 in (0.75 m)	9 ft 0 in (2.74 m)	21 reps
All values from NFL Combine/Pro Day

On April 30, 2026, after going undrafted in the 2026 NFL draft, Wagner signed with the Tennessee Titans as an undrafted free agent. On August 30, he was waived by the Titans as a part of final roster cuts before the start of the regular season.

On November 18, 2026, Wagner was selected in the first round (seventh overall pick) of the 2027 UFL Draft by the DC Defenders.
