= 2025 College Football Playoff National Championship =

Postseason college football bowl game

2025 College Football Playoff National Championship presented by AT&T
- 11th College Football Playoff National Championship
Ohio State Buckeyes	Notre Dame Fighting Irish
(13–2)	(14–1)
Big Ten	Independent
34	23
Head coach: Ryan Day	Head coach: Marcus Freeman
AP / Coaches / CFP; 6 / 7 / 6	AP / Coaches / CFP; 3 / 3 / 5
	1	2	3	4	Total
Ohio State	0	21	10	3	34
Notre Dame	7	0	8	8	23
- Date: January 20, 2025
- Season: 2024
- Stadium: Mercedes-Benz Stadium (Note: The game was originally scheduled to be played at Allegiant Stadium in Paradise, Nevada. The move to Atlanta, necessitated due to scheduling conflicts, was announced in May 2022.)
- Location: Atlanta, Georgia
- MVP: Will Howard (Ohio State, QB); Cody Simon (Ohio State, LB)
- Favorite: Ohio State by 8.5
- National anthem: Coco Jones with Adam Blackstone
- Referee: Steve Marlowe (SEC)
- Halftime show: Travis Scott
- Attendance: 77,660

United States TV coverage
- Network: ESPN
- Announcers: Chris Fowler (play-by-play), Kirk Herbstreit (analyst), Holly Rowe and Molly McGrath (sidelines)
- Nielsen ratings: 22.1 million viewers

International TV coverage
- Network: ESPN Deportes; Brazil: ESPN Brazil/Disney+ United Kingdom: Sky Sports
- Announcers: ESPN Brazil: Matheus Pinheiro (play-by-play), Weinny Eirado (analyst), Eduardo Zolin (analyst) and Giane Pessoa (rules analyst); ESPN Deportes: Eduardo Varela (play-by-play), Pablo Viruega (analyst), Katia Castorena and Ciro Procuna (sidelines)

The 2025 College Football Playoff National Championship was a college football bowl game played on January 20, 2025, at Mercedes-Benz Stadium in Atlanta, Georgia. The eleventh College Football Playoff National Championship, the game determined the national champion of the NCAA Division I Football Bowl Subdivision (FBS) for the 2024 season. It was the final game of the 2024–25 College Football Playoff (CFP), the first national championship under the 12-team CFP format, and, aside from any all-star games afterward, the culminating game of the 2024–25 bowl season. The game began at 7:30 p.m. EST and was televised nationally by ESPN. Sponsored by telecommunications company AT&T, the game was officially known as the 2025 College Football Playoff National Championship presented by AT&T.

The game featured the No. 8 seed Ohio State Buckeyes from the Big Ten Conference and the No. 7 seed Notre Dame Fighting Irish, an FBS independent. The teams had met eight times previously, with Notre Dame winning the first two and Ohio State winning the last six, including a home-and-home in 2022 and 2023. It was their third postseason meeting after the 2006 Fiesta Bowl and 2016 Fiesta Bowl. Ohio State entered seeking their ninth national championship, the first since 2014, while Notre Dame entered seeking their twelfth and the first since 1988. The game marked the first back-to-back national championships without a participant from the Southeastern Conference (SEC) since the 2005 Orange Bowl and 2006 Rose Bowl.

Notre Dame began the game with a Riley Leonard touchdown that concluded an 18-play drive with a duration of nearly ten minutes. Ohio State scored touchdowns on all three of its possessions in the first half on passes from Will Howard to Jeremiah Smith and Quinshon Judkins, as well as a Judkins rush, giving the Buckeyes a 21–7 lead at halftime. They continued their scoring streak to begin the third quarter; after a 70-yard rush by Judkins on the second play of the second half, Ohio State scored shortly after and added a field goal on their following drive to push their lead to 31–7. A Jaden Greathouse touchdown reception followed for the Irish, who regained possession quickly following an Ohio State fumble. Notre Dame's ensuing field goal attempt was unsuccessful, though they forced a punt and Greathouse caught another touchdown pass which, along with a successful two-point conversion, narrowed Ohio State's lead to eight. The Buckeyes kicked a field goal on their last possession after running out much of the clock, however, and won the national championship by a score of 34–23.

== Background ==
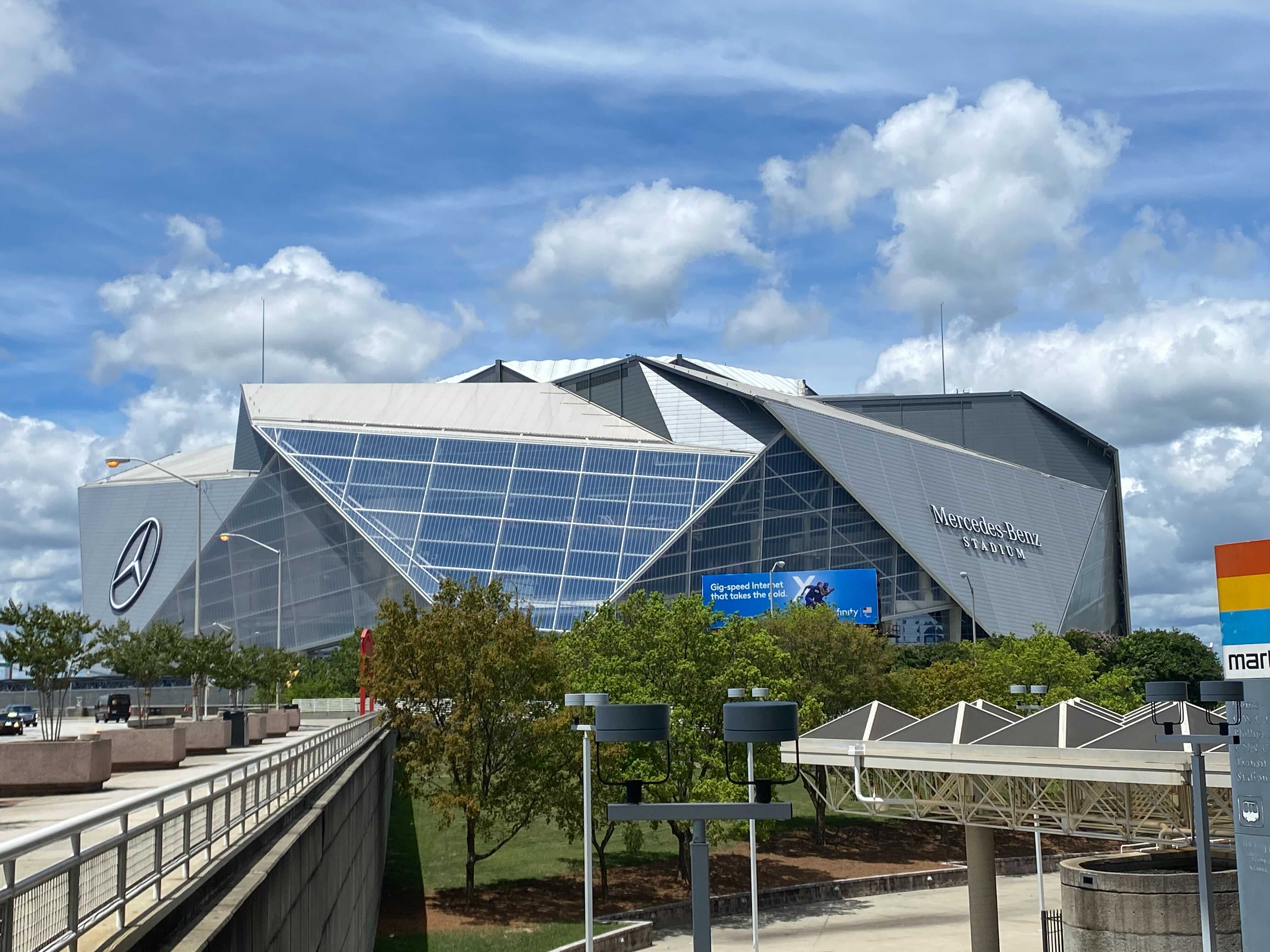
Mercedes-Benz Stadium (pictured in 2021), the host site for the championship

=== Host selection ===
On January 7, 2022, the College Football Playoff (CFP) awarded the rights to host the 2025 championship to Allegiant Stadium in Paradise, Nevada. However, Allegiant Stadium had to relinquish hosting duties due to a conflict with the Consumer Electronics Show, which was not able to be moved to a later date. As a result, Mercedes-Benz Stadium in Atlanta, Georgia, was named as the replacement host site on May 5, 2022. As Mercedes-Benz Stadium hosted the 2018 CFP national championship, the 2025 game made Atlanta the first city to host the CFP national championship twice. The 71,000-seat retractable roof stadium, built to replace the Georgia Dome in 2017, is also the annual host of the Aflac Kickoff Game, SEC Championship Game, the Peach Bowl, the Celebration Bowl, the Atlanta Falcons of the National Football League (NFL), and Atlanta United FC of Major League Soccer (MLS). Additionally, it has hosted the 2018 MLS Cup, Super Bowl LIII, two matches during the 2024 Copa América, and six matches during the 2025 FIFA Club World Cup. In the future, it has been selected to host matches during the 2026 FIFA World Cup, including a semifinal. In October 2024, the NFL announced that the stadium will host Super Bowl LXII.

Mercedes-Benz Stadium arranged for the game
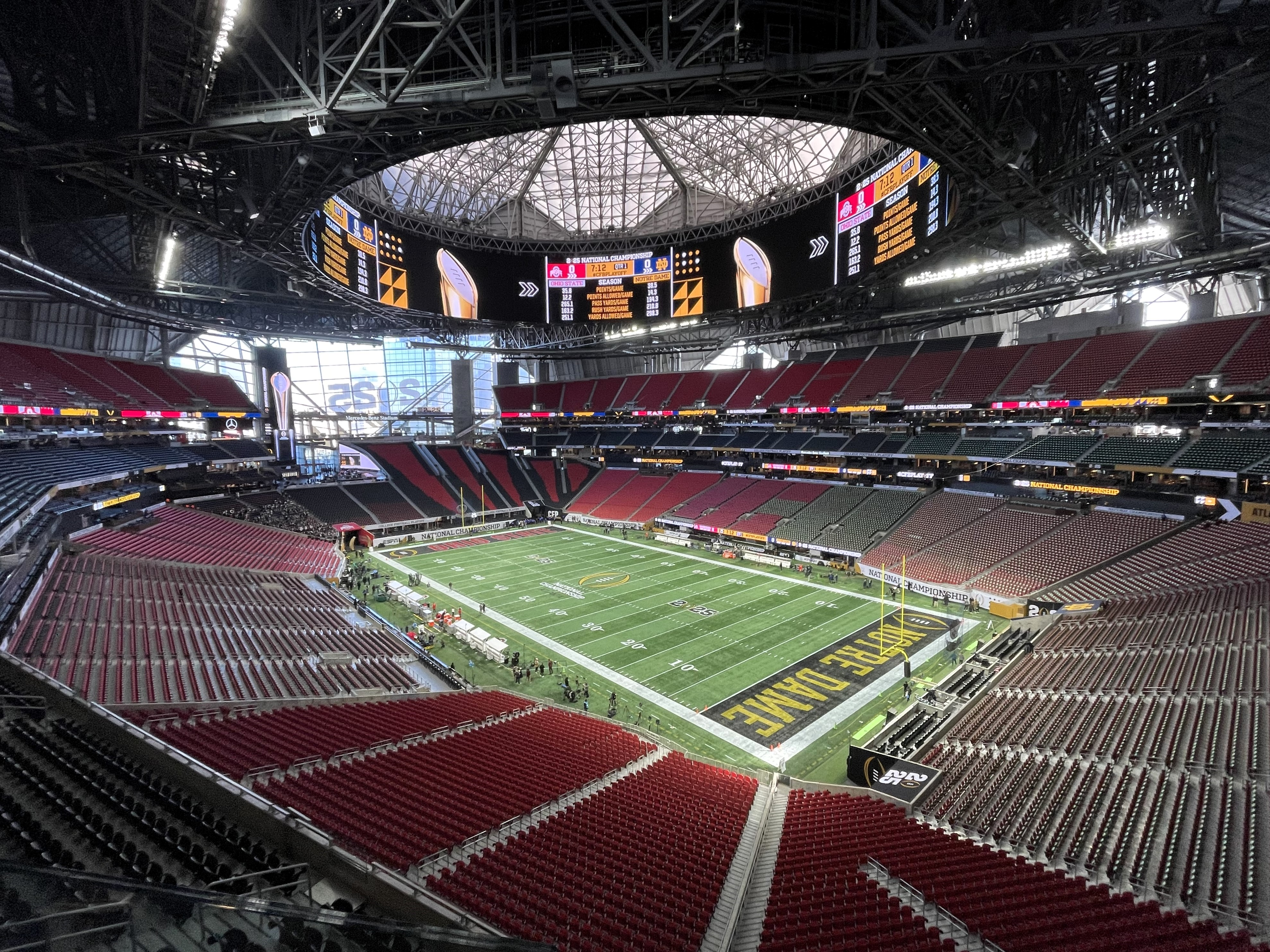
Press box view

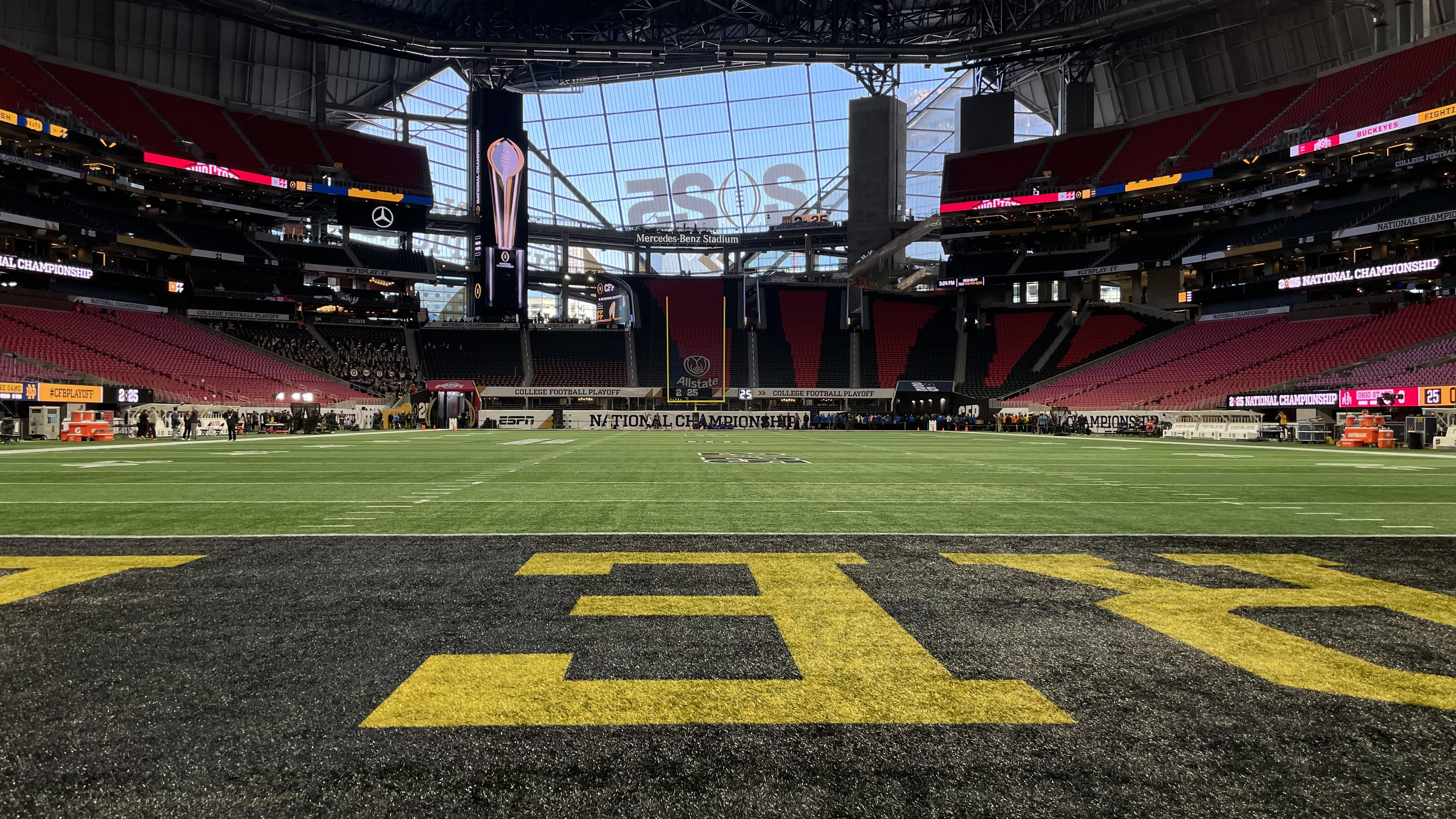
West end zone view

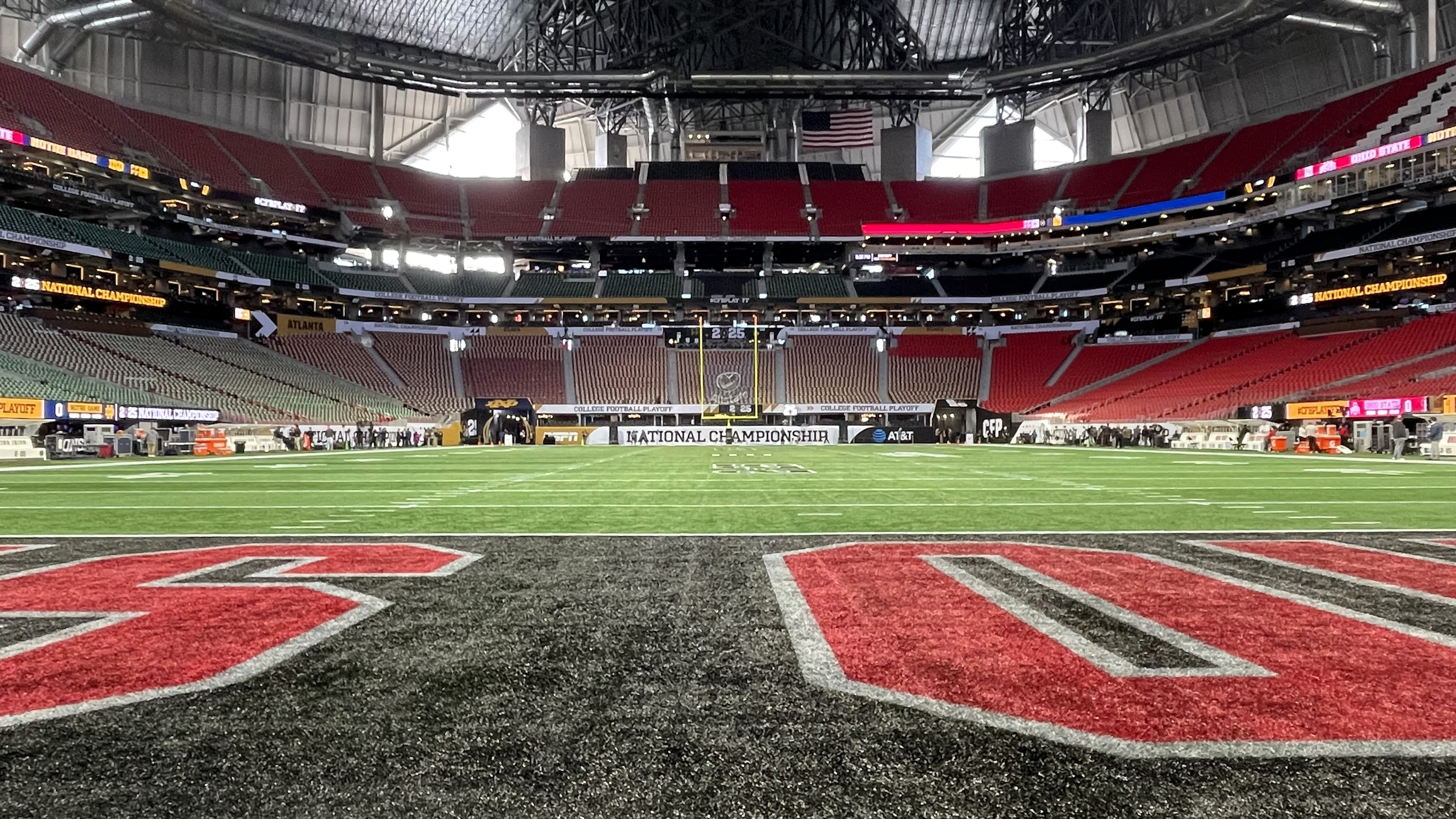
East end zone view

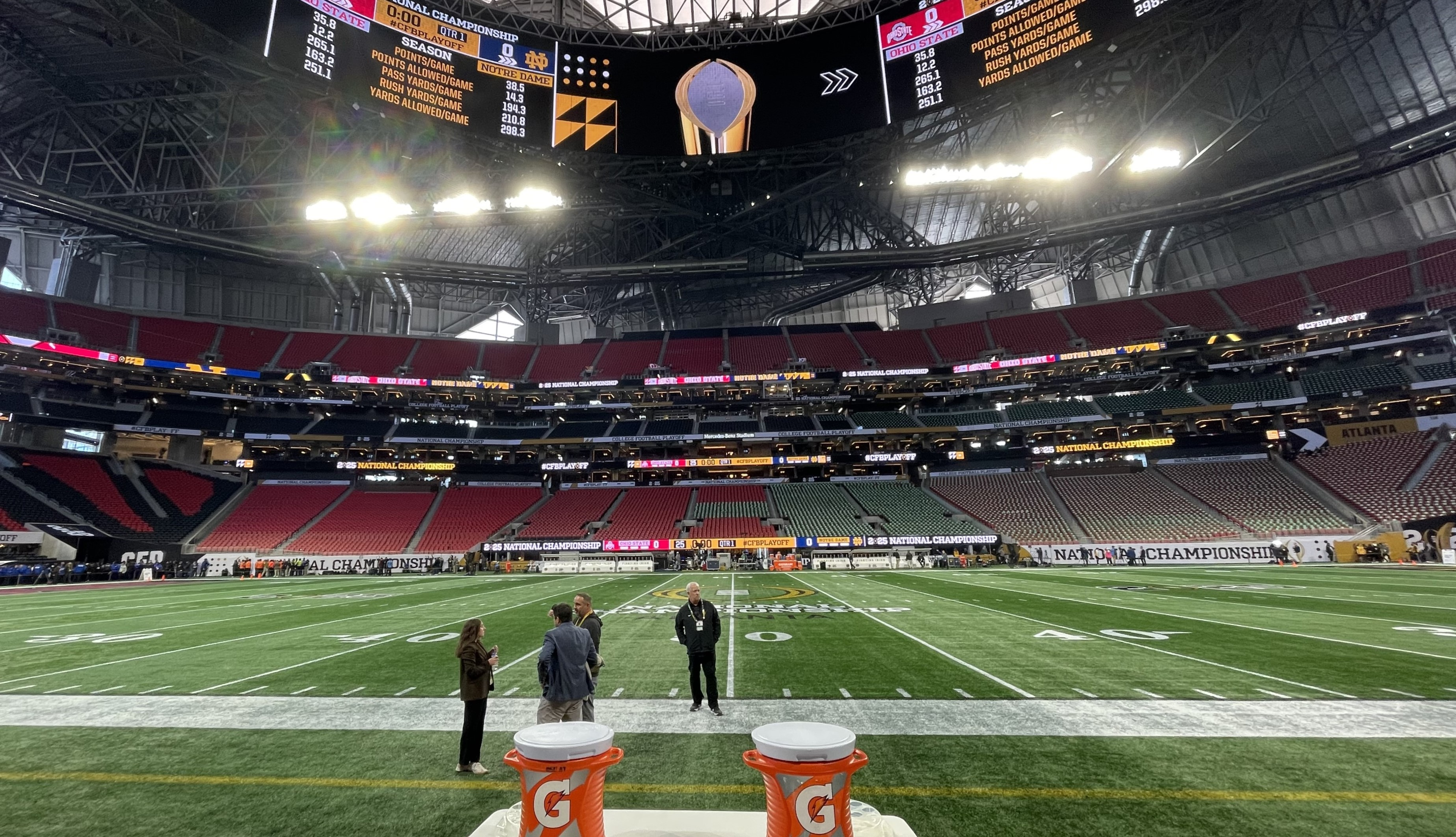
Ohio State sideline view

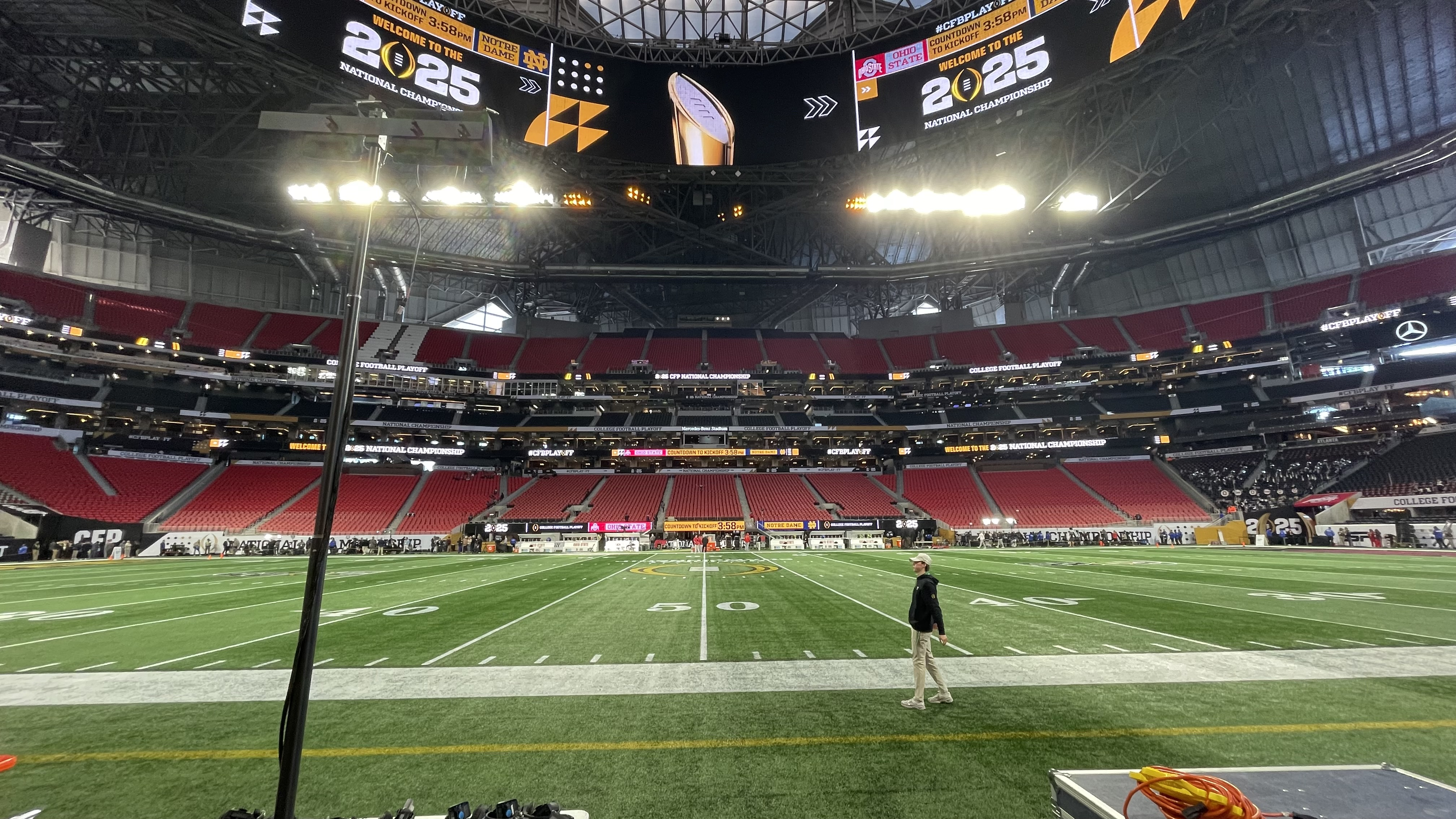
Notre Dame sideline view
Photos taken pre-game

== Teams ==
The game marked the ninth meeting all-time between the Buckeyes and Fighting Irish; Notre Dame won the first two games, in 1935 and 1936, while Ohio State won each of the next six meetings. The teams had last met as part of a home-and-home series with the Buckeyes earning victories of 21–10 and 17–14 on September 3, 2022, and September 23, 2023, respectively. It was the teams' sixth consecutive meeting in which both were ranked in the top ten by the AP Poll. The game was their third postseason meeting following Ohio State victories in the 2006 Fiesta Bowl and the 2016 Fiesta Bowl.

Ohio State entered the game seeking their ninth national championship and their second of the CFP era following their win over Oregon in the 2015 College Football Playoff National Championship. Notre Dame entered seeking its twelfth title and their first of the CFP era, with the last coming in 1988. Both teams had appeared in championship games more recently, though: Ohio State fell to Alabama in the 2021 College Football Playoff National Championship, while Notre Dame similarly lost to Alabama in the 2013 BCS National Championship Game (Notre Dame’s appearance was later vacated by the NCAA).

After the 2024 College Football Playoff National Championship featured Michigan, from the Big Ten, and Washington, from the Pac-12, this matchup marked the second consecutive national championship without a participant from the Southeastern Conference (SEC). This had not occurred since consecutive Big 12 vs. Pac-10 matchups in the 2005 Orange Bowl, which featured Oklahoma (who joined the SEC in 2024) and USC, and the 2006 Rose Bowl, which featured Texas (who also joined the SEC in 2024) and USC.

=== Ohio State Buckeyes ===
Ohio State finished the regular season with a 10–2 record overall and a 7–2 record in Big Ten Conference games. Their only losses were to Oregon and archrival Michigan in an upset. Ranked sixth in the final CFP poll, the Buckeyes received the eighth seed in the playoff. They played and defeated Tennessee 42–17 in their first-round game in Columbus, Oregon in a rematch in the Rose Bowl quarterfinal 41–21, and Texas in the Cotton Bowl semifinal 28–14. As a result, the Buckeyes entered the championship game with a 13–2 record.

Sixth-year head coach Ryan Day entered with a 69–10 record with the Buckeyes; this marked his second championship game appearance.

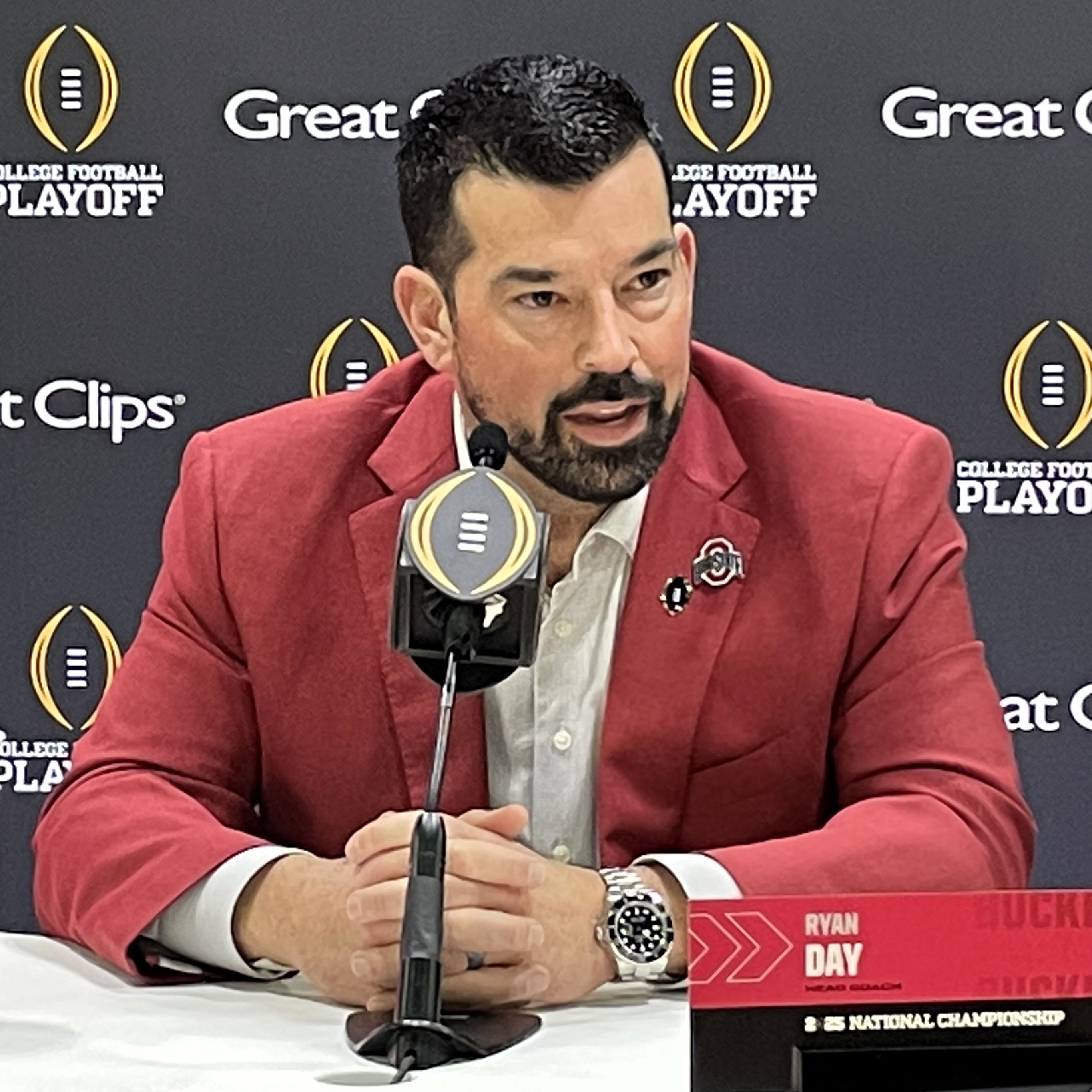
Ohio State head coach Ryan Day

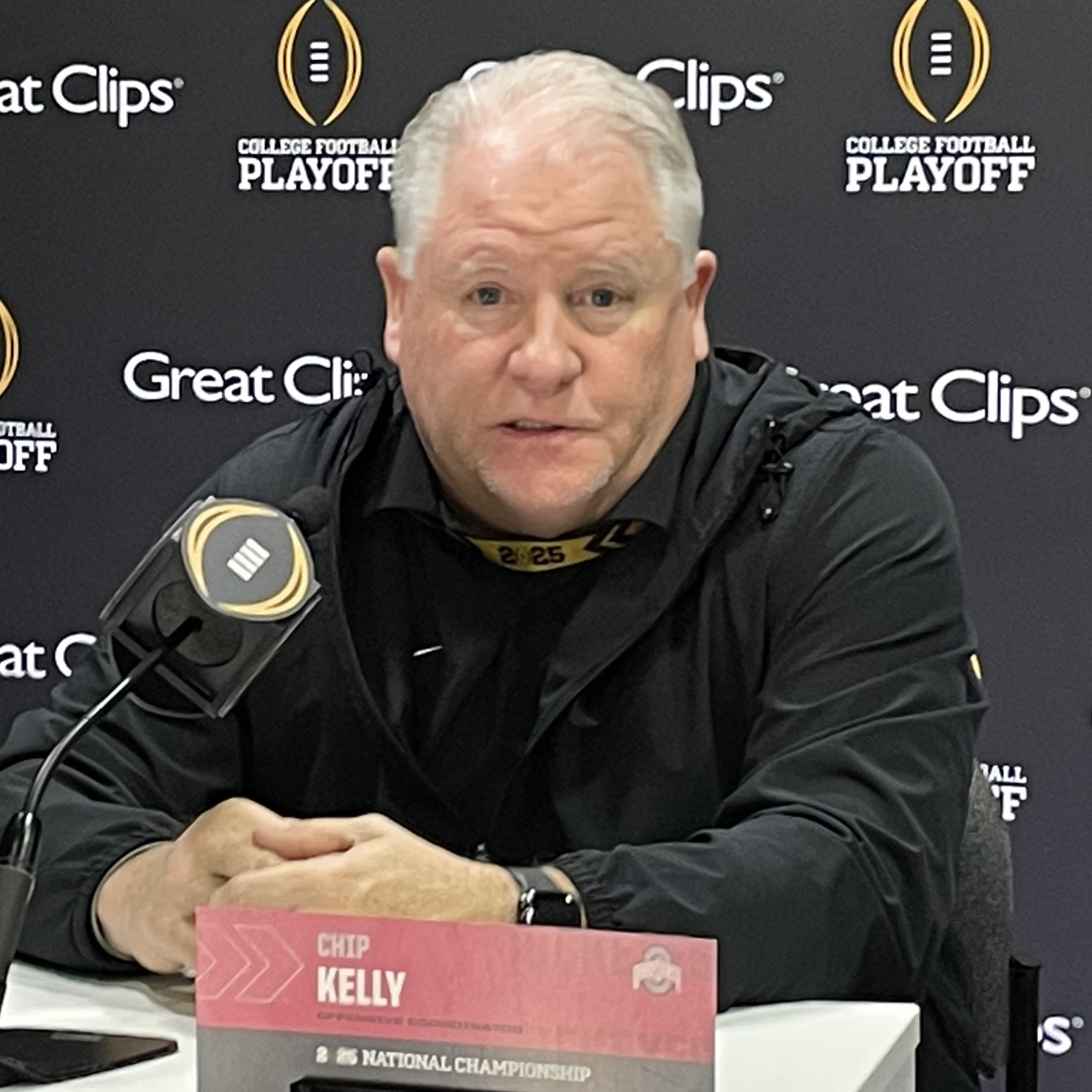
Ohio State offensive coordinator Chip Kelly

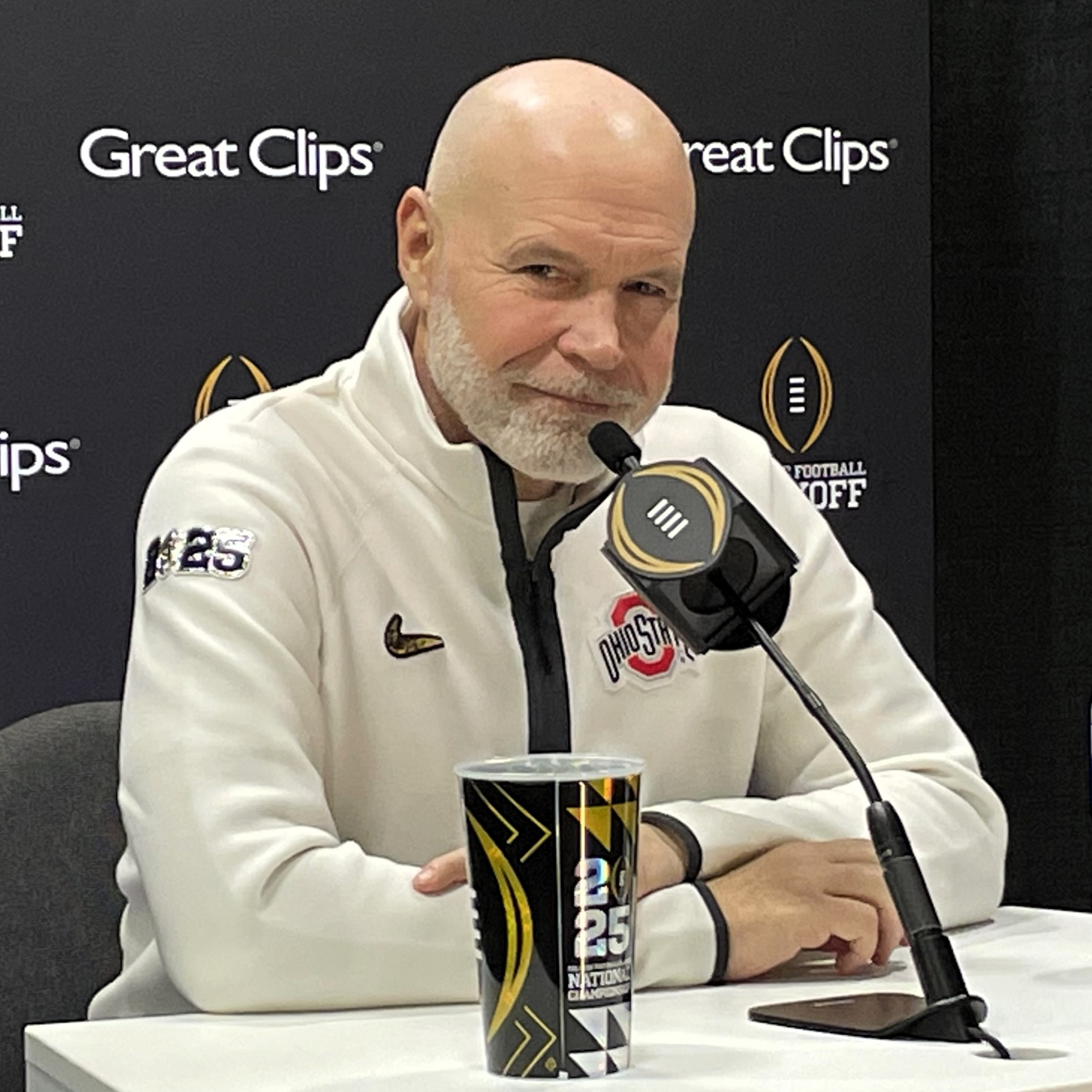
Ohio State defensive coordinator Jim Knowles
Photos from CFP Media Day.

=== Notre Dame Fighting Irish ===
Notre Dame finished the regular season with an 11–1 record, with their only loss being a major upset against Northern Illinois on September 7. The Fighting Irish were seeded seventh in the CFP and won a first-round home playoff game over Indiana 27–17, the Sugar Bowl quarterfinal over Georgia 23–10, and the Orange Bowl semifinal over Penn State 27–24 to earn a berth in the championship game. The Irish entered the championship game with a 14–1 record; their 14 wins marked the most in school history.

The game marked the first championship appearance for third-year head coach Marcus Freeman, who entered the game with a 33–9 record at Notre Dame. At the time of the game, he was one of five Ohio State alumni to coach a game against the Buckeyes.

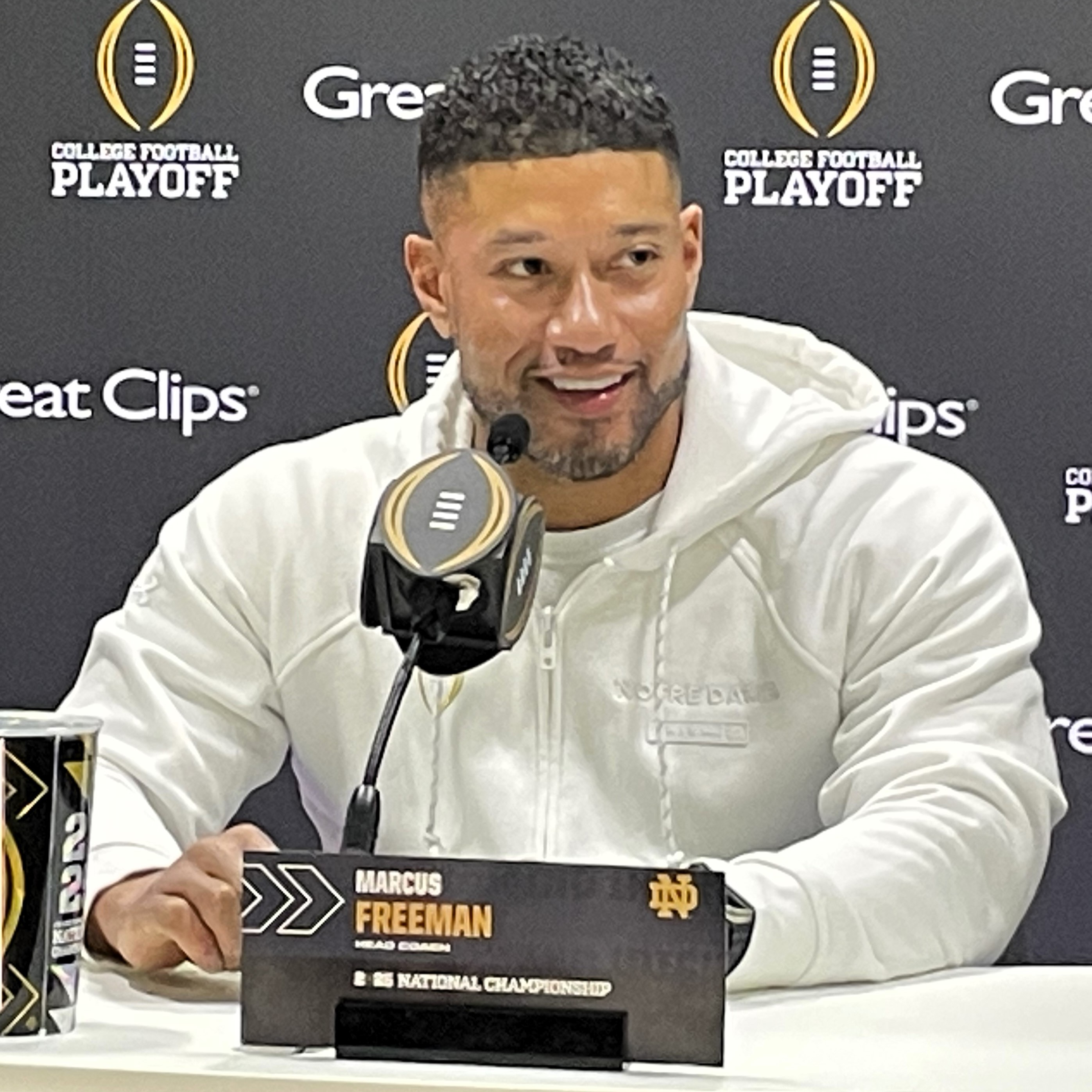
Notre Dame head coach Marcus Freeman

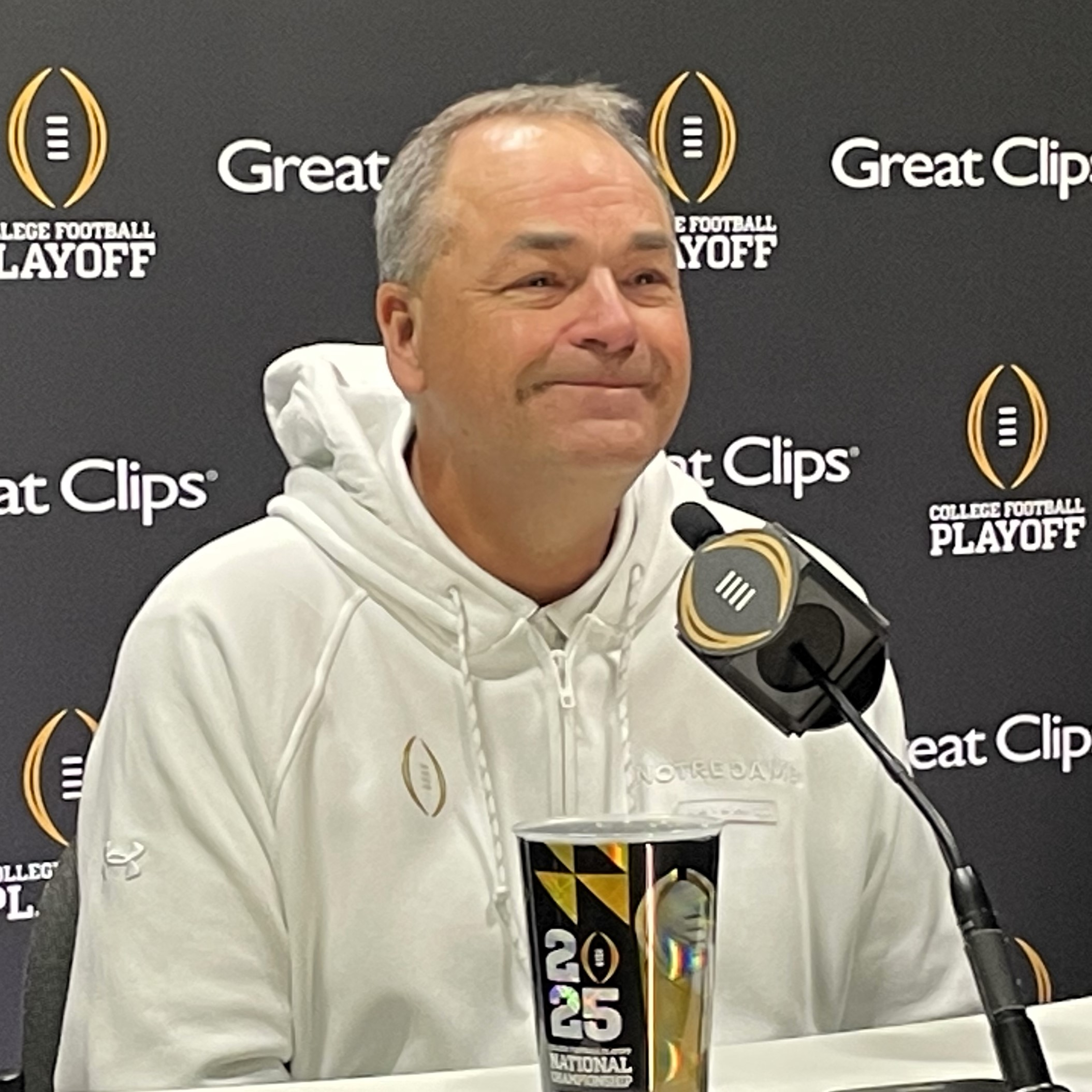
Notre Dame offensive coordinator Mike Denbrock

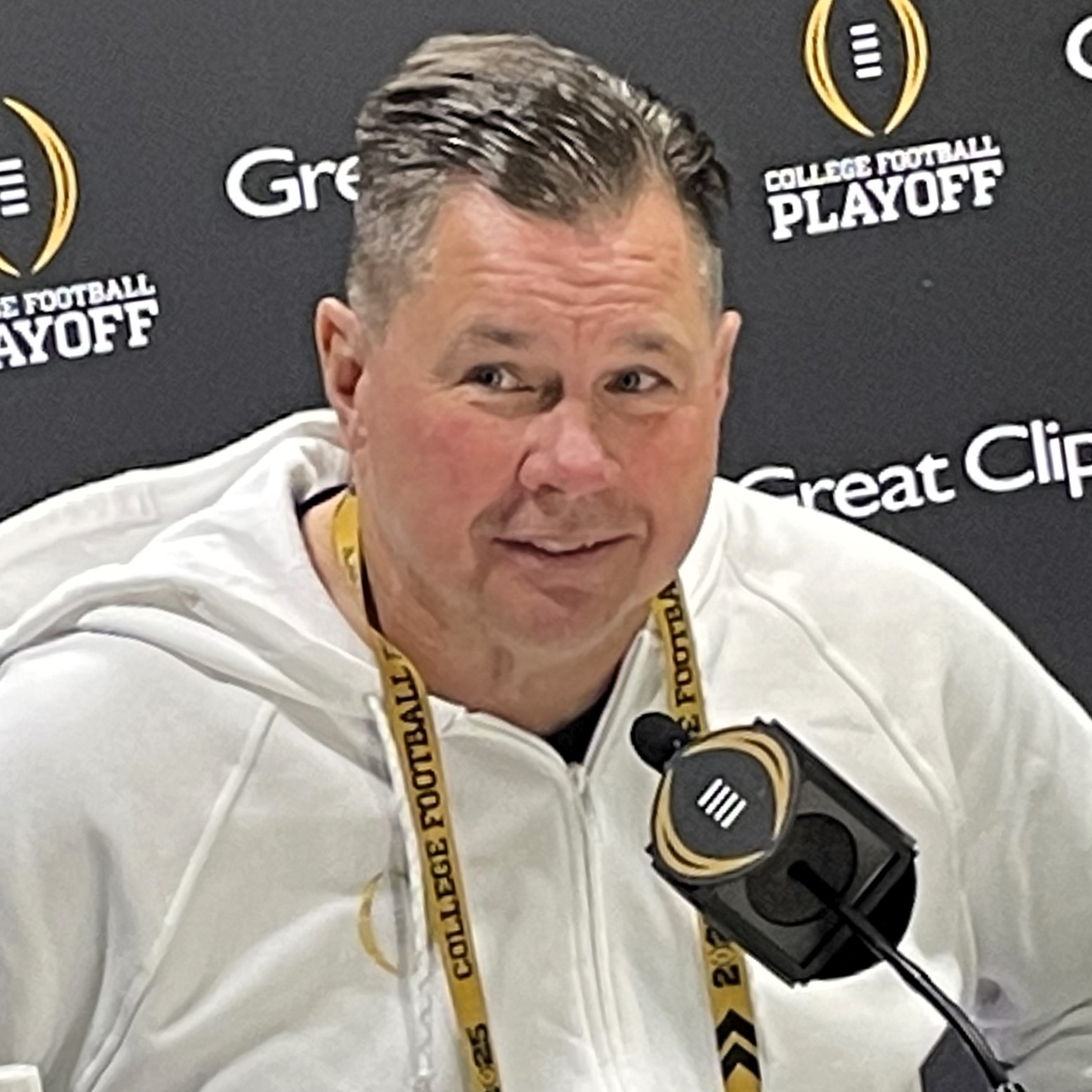
Notre Dame defensive coordinator Al Golden
Photos from CFP Media Day.

== Starting lineups ==
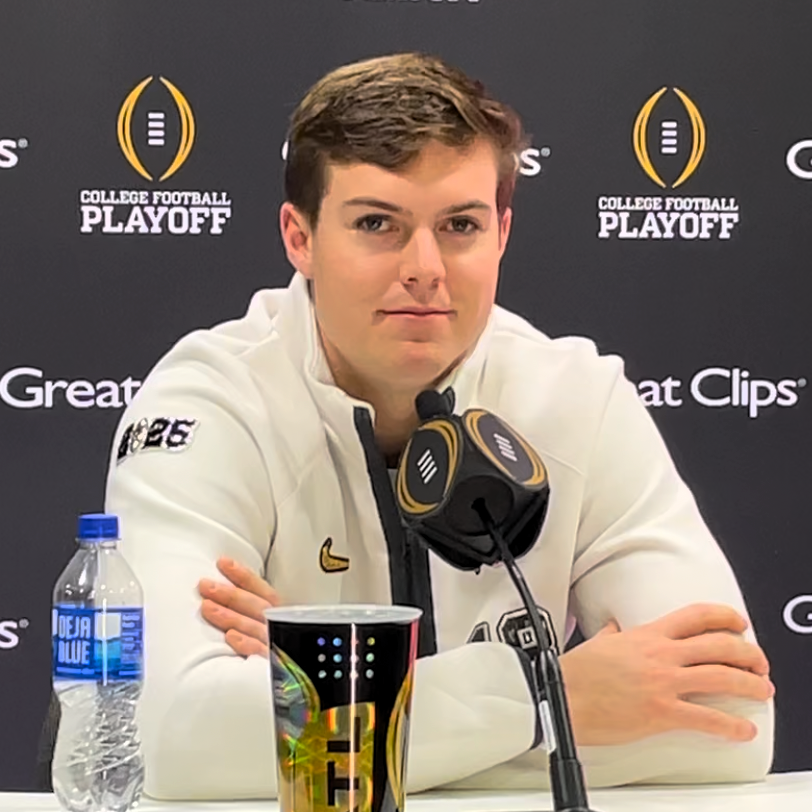
Ohio State quarterback Will Howard

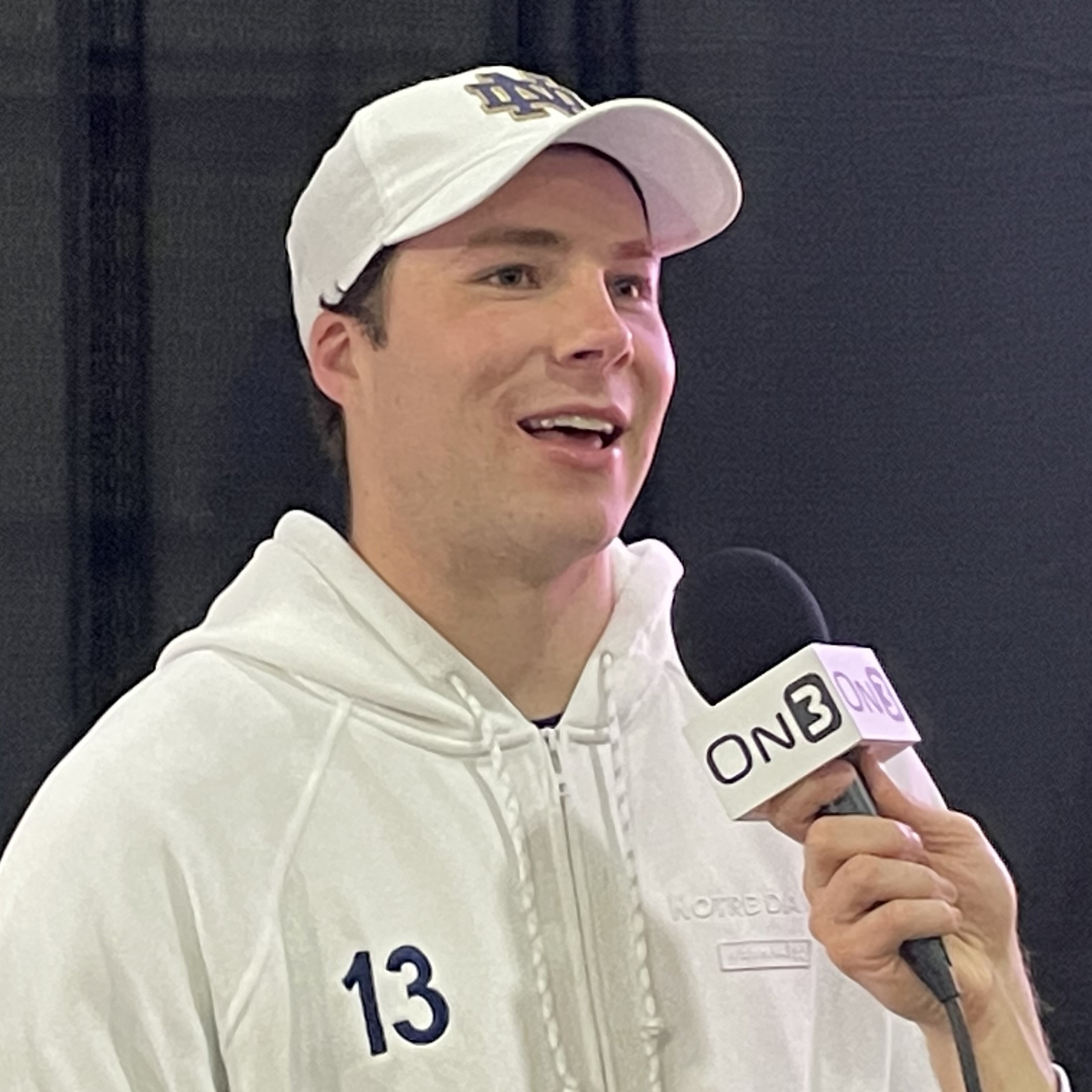
Notre Dame quarterback Riley Leonard

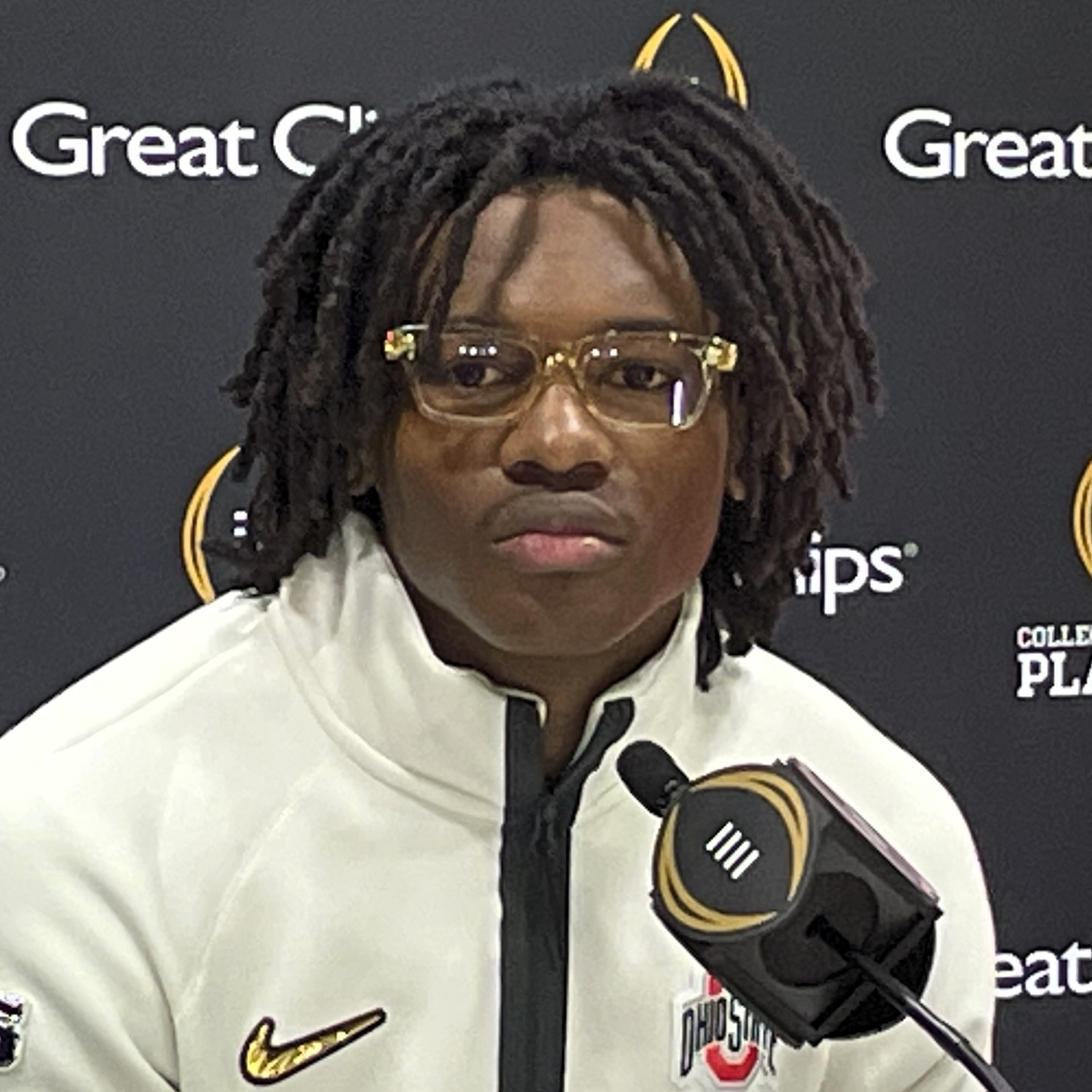
Ohio State wide receiver Jeremiah Smith

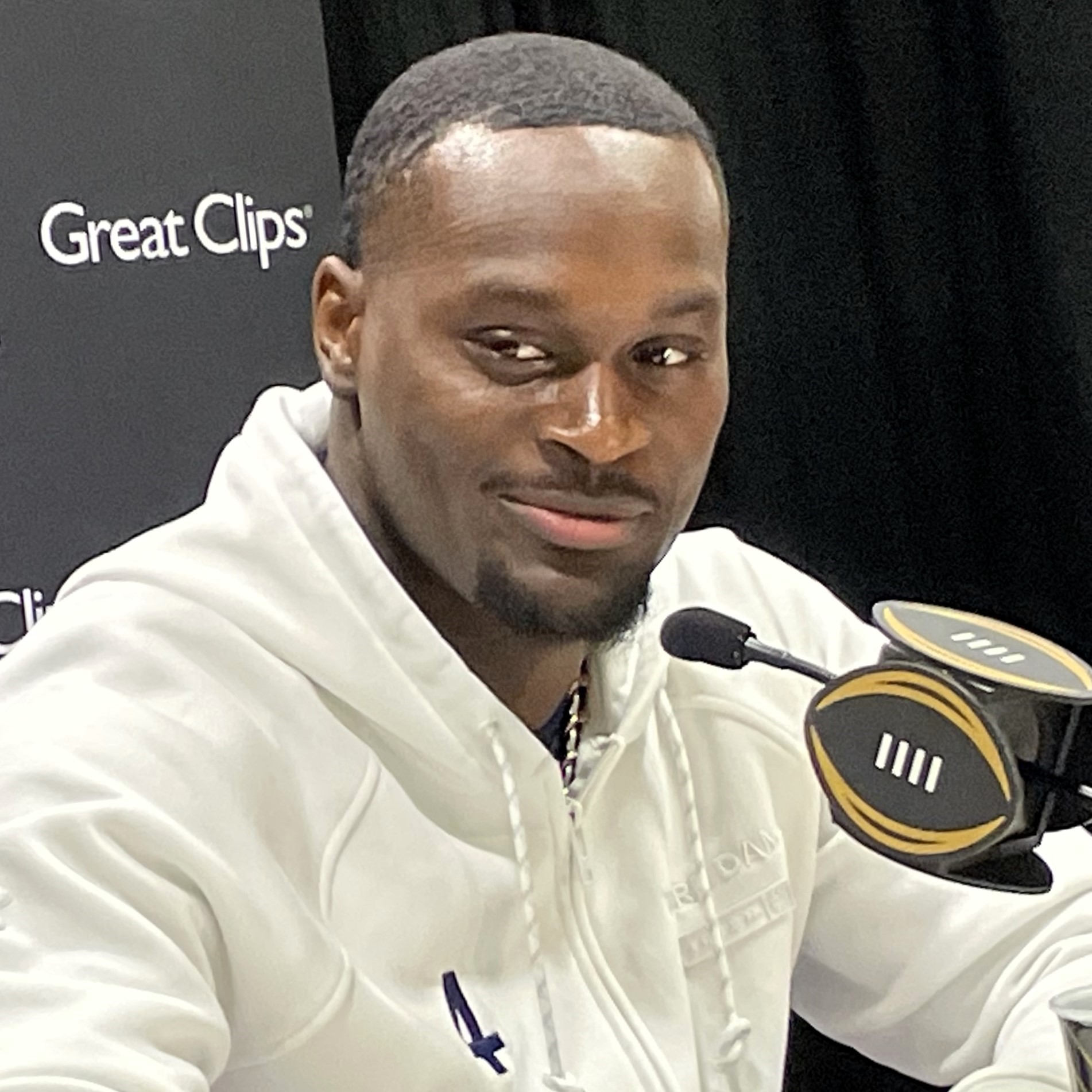
Notre Dame running back Jeremiyah Love

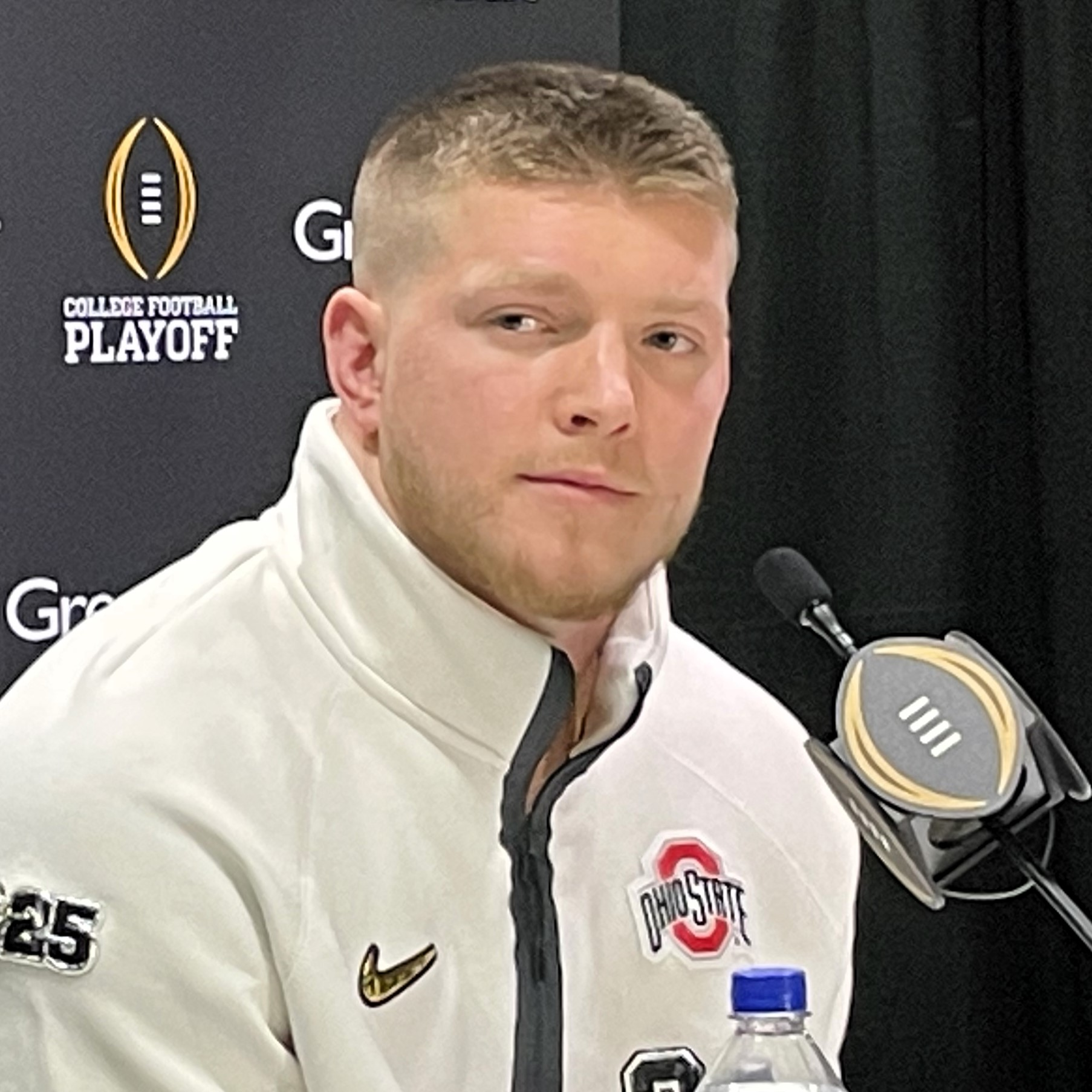
Ohio State defensive end Jack Sawyer

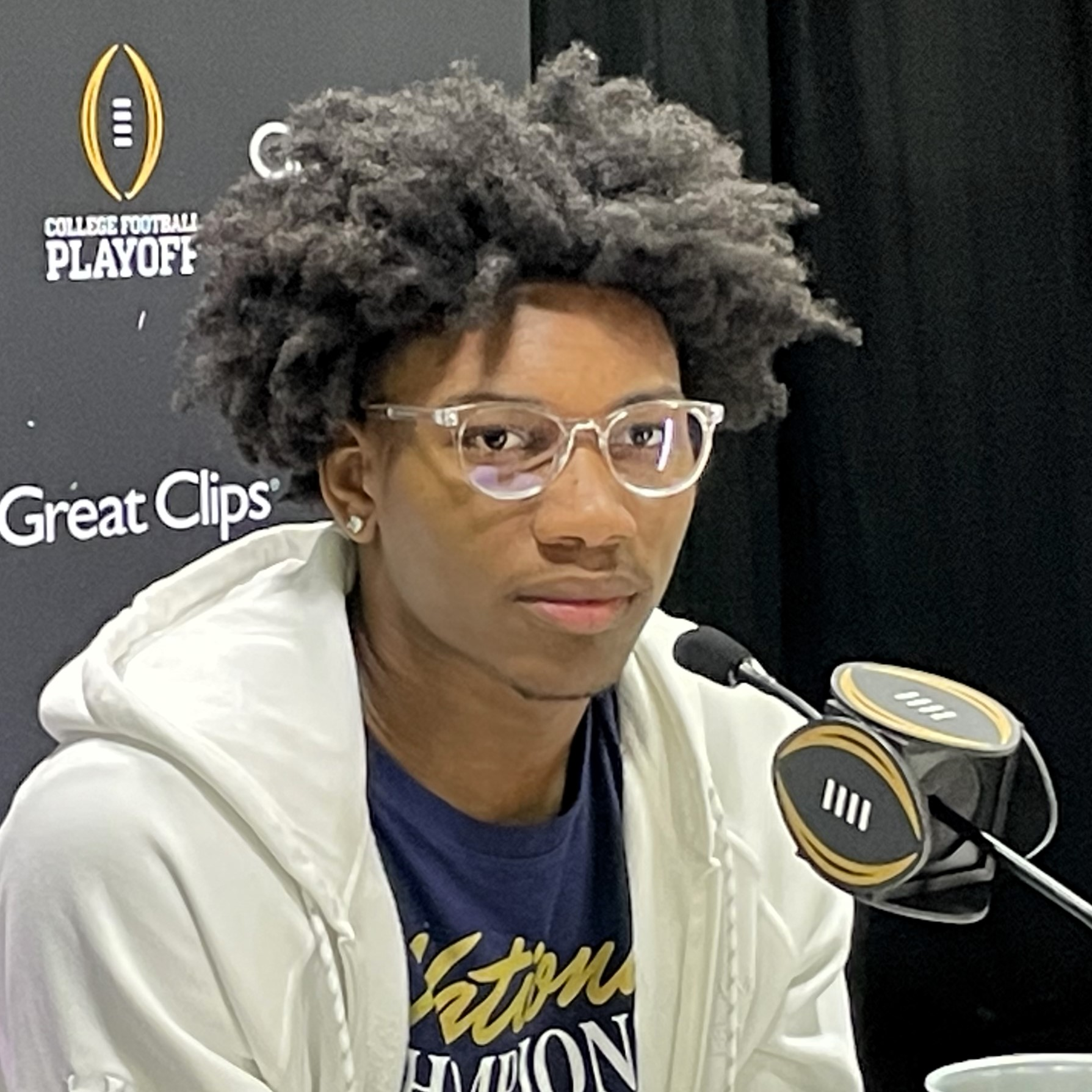
Notre Dame cornerback Christian Gray

Ohio State	Position		Notre Dame
Offense
Jeremiah Smith	WR		Beaux Collins
Emeka Egbuka 1	WR		Jaden Greathouse
Donovan Jackson 1	LT		Charles Jagusah
Luke Montgomery	LG		Billy Schrauth 5
Carson Hinzman	C		Pat Coogan 6
Tegra Tshabola	RG		Rocco Spindler
Josh Fryar	RT		Aamil Wagner
Will Kacmarek 3	TE		Mitchell Evans 5
Gee Scott Jr.	TE	WR	Kris Mitchell
Will Howard 6	QB		Riley Leonard 6
TreVeyon Henderson 2	RB		Jeremiyah Love 1
Defense
Ty Hamilton 5	DL		Howard Cross III
Tyleik Williams 1	DL		Gabriel Rubio 6
Jack Sawyer 4	DE		Joshua Burnham
JT Tuimoloau 2	DE		RJ Oben
Cody Simon 4	LB		Drayk Bowen
Sonny Styles 1	LB		Jack Kiser 4
Denzel Burke 5	CB		Christian Gray
Davison Igbinosun 2	CB		Leonard Moore
Lathan Ransom 4	SS		Adon Shuler
† Caleb Downs 1	FS		† Xavier Watts 3
Jordan Hancock 5	DB	LB	Jaylen Sneed
Source • † 2024 All-American
Selected in an NFL draft (number corresponds to draft round)

== Broadcasting ==
The game was televised in the United States on ESPN, with Megacast coverage across numerous other channels in the ESPN family. ESPN2 carried Field Pass with The Pat McAfee Show, ESPNU aired the Command Center broadcast, and ESPNews had the SkyCast feed. Additionally, ESPN Deportes aired the Spanish-language broadcast. The national radio feed was aired on ESPN Radio while WatchESPN carried the Hometown Radio feeds, featuring each team's radio commentary crew. The ESPN telecast was produced on-site in 1080p HDR, but it was converted to, and broadcast in, 4K, making this the first game with a primary telecast in 4K. (Note: ESPN had previously offered a 4K-resolution broadcast of its SkyCam feed, but this game was the first whose main broadcast was in 4K.)

The game was broadcast on Sky Sports in the United Kingdom and on The Sports Network in Canada.

=== Commentary teams ===
The Saturday Night Football commentary team of Chris Fowler, Kirk Herbstreit, and Holly Rowe featured on the primary ESPN broadcast, with Molly McGrath joining Rowe as a sideline reporter. Bill Lemonnier, a former Big Ten referee, also featured as a rules analyst. The ESPN2 broadcast featured Pat McAfee, A. J. Hawk, Darius Butler, Connor Campbell, Ty Schmit and Tone Digs. The ESPN Radio feed featured play-by-play commentary from Sean McDonough, analysis from Greg McElroy, sideline commentary from Ian Fitzsimmons and Katie George, and rules analysis from former SEC referee Matt Austin. The Spanish-language commentary team of Eduardo Varela, Pablo Viruega, Katia Castorena and Ciro Procuna featured on the ESPN Deportes telecast, while ESPN Brazil's Portuguese-language broadcast featured Matheus Pinheiro, Weinny Eirado, Eduardo Zolin and Giane Pessoa.

The Ohio State Sports Network radio feed featured commentary from Paul Keels, Jim Lachey, Matt Andrews, and Skip Mosic, while the Notre Dame Football Radio Network broadcast featured Tony Simeone and Ryan Harris.

== Game summary ==
The game's officiating crew, representing the Southeastern Conference, was led by referee Steve Marlowe. The game was scheduled to begin at 7:30 p.m. EST, though its actual start time was 7:48 p.m. The ceremonial pregame coin toss—to which Bernice King was invited, though the toss itself was performed by Marlowe—was won by Ohio State, who deferred their choice to the second half, thereby giving Notre Dame possession of the ball to begin the game.

=== First half ===
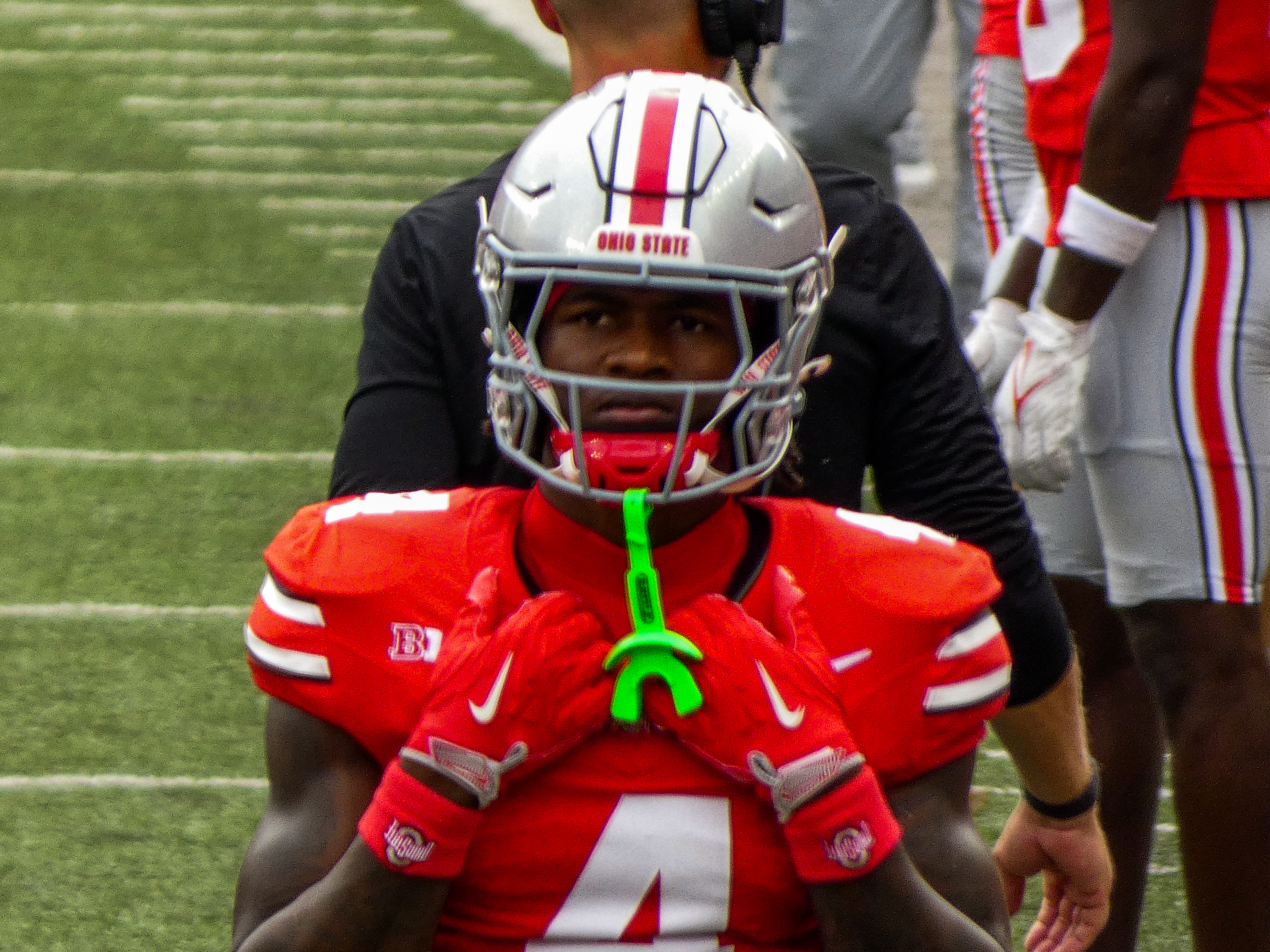
Jeremiah Smith (pictured in 2024) scored Ohio State's first touchdown.

Ohio State kicker Jayden Fielding began the game with a touchback on the opening kickoff, giving Notre Dame possession of the ball at their own 25-yard line. The Irish converted two third downs and two fourth downs as part of their 18-play opening drive which concluded with a 1-yard Riley Leonard rushing touchdown after nearly ten minutes played. Ohio State similarly began their first offensive series on their own 25-yard line and reached Notre Dame territory in six plays following a 19-yard TreVeyon Henderson rush and a 15-yard pass from Will Howard to Quinshon Judkins. The Buckeyes recovered from a 5-yard loss on 1st & 10 on the Notre Dame 25-yard line with a 12-yard pass to Emeka Egbuka and a 5-yard Howard rush, earning the Buckeyes a first down at the Notre Dame 13-yard line to conclude the first quarter.

After a 5-yard Judkins rush began the second quarter, Ohio State scored their first touchdown on an 8-yard pass from Howard to Jeremiah Smith; Fielding's extra point tied the game at seven points apiece. The next Fighting Irish drive was set back by false start and holding penalties on consecutive plays, ultimately leading to a punt on 4th & 15. Ohio State resumed possession at their own 24-yard line and completed three plays—all of which gained ten yards or more—to reach the red zone with 8:20 remaining in the half. The Buckeyes converted a third down from the 12-yard line and took the lead on the following play with a 9-yard Judkins touchdown. The Irish went three-and-out on their third drive; they punted following a fumble on third down. James Rendell's punt was returned by Brandon Inniss to the Ohio State 20-yard line, where the Buckeyes took over with 4:48 to play. They converted a third down with a 19-yard pass from Howard to Inniss and had reached their own 45-yard line by the two-minute timeout. Another third-down conversion shortly followed—a 20-yard pass from Howard to Carnell Tate—and the drive concluded six plays later with a 6-yard touchdown pass from Howard to Judkins. Notre Dame ran one play, a 7-yard pass from Leonard to Beaux Collins, before the end of the second quarter. Ohio State led at halftime by a score of 21–7.

=== Second half ===
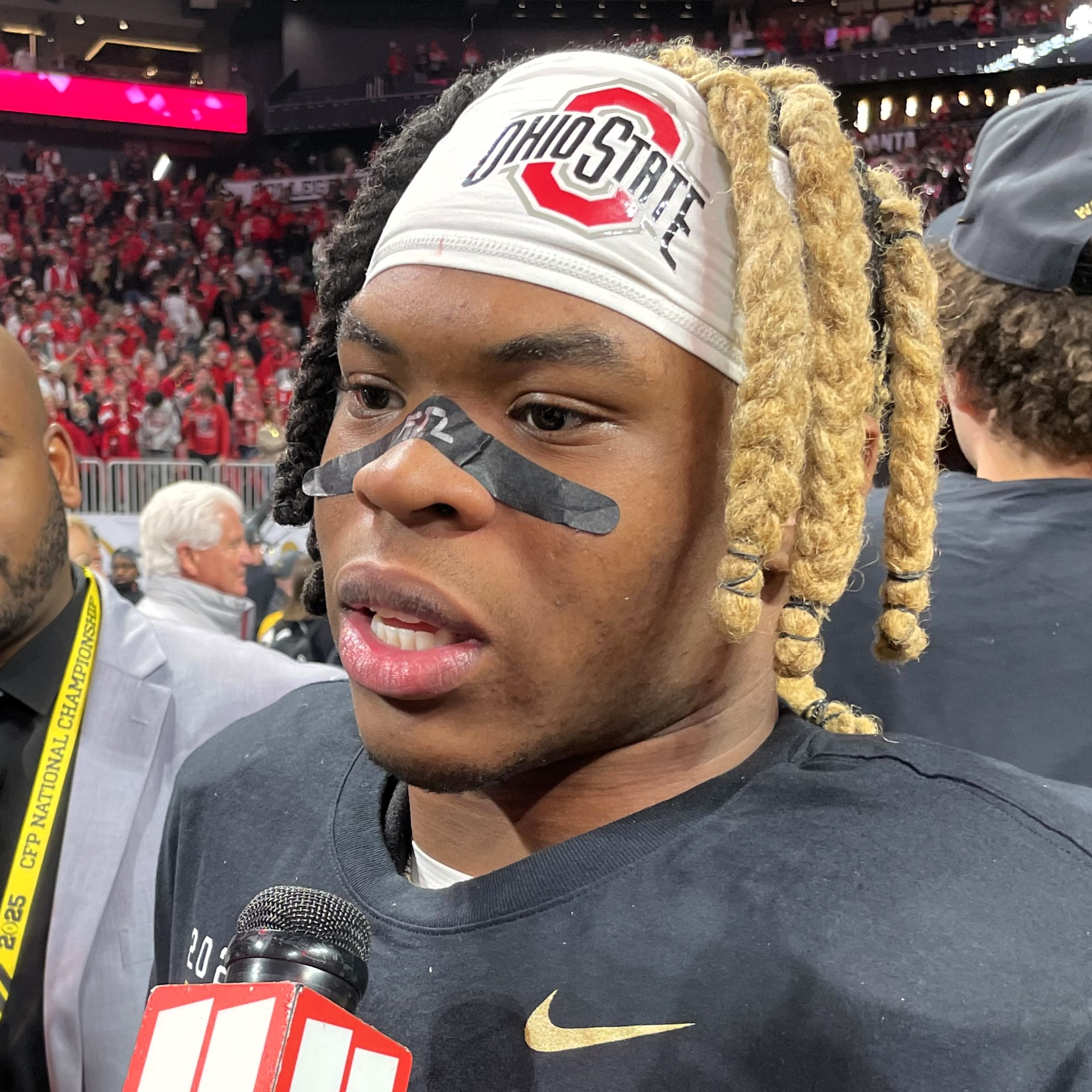
Quinshon Judkins (pictured postgame) opened second half scoring with his third touchdown of the game.

Ohio State began the third quarter with possession of the ball at their own 25-yard line following a touchback by Mitch Jeter. On their second play from scrimmage, Judkins rushed for a 70-yard gain before being tackled at the Notre Dame 5-yard line. After several more plays, Judkins rushed for a 1-yard touchdown, capping a 5-play drive to begin the half and increasing Ohio State's lead to 28–7 following Fielding's successful extra point. Notre Dame appeared to have been held to a three-and-out on their first drive of the second half but ran a fake punt on 4th & 2 which was unsuccessful. This turnover on downs gave Ohio State the ball at the Notre Dame 33-yard line, but the Buckeyes stalled on 3rd & 16 after gaining five yards in five plays and ultimately pushed their lead to 24 points on a 46-yard field goal by Fielding. The Fighting Irish faced 3rd & 19 on the sixth play of their ensuing drive, but a pass interference penalty gave them a first down that extended the possession. Four plays later, they scored for the first time since the opening quarter on a 34-yard touchdown pass from Leonard to Jaden Greathouse which was followed by a two-point pass from Leonard to Jeremiyah Love, narrowing Ohio State's led to sixteen. A pass and two rushes by Howard gained the Buckeyes a first down to begin their next drive; they reached the Notre Dame 45-yard line following a roughing the passer penalty and a 2-yard Henderson rush as the third quarter concluded.

Notre Dame retook possession on the first play of the fourth quarter when a fumble by Egbuka was forced by Drayk Bowen and recovered by Kyngstonn Viliamu-Asa at the Irish 21-yard line. They faced 3rd & 9 early in the drive but converted with a 30-yard pass from Leonard to Greathouse, advancing them to Ohio State territory. They faced 3rd & 12 several plays later and gained seven yards before converting on 4th & 5 to continue their possession at the Ohio State 22-yard line. A holding penalty on Ohio State moved the Irish to the 8-yard line but the drive ended with an unsuccessful 27-yard field goal attempt which deflected off of the left upright. Ohio State took the ball at the 20-yard line as a result but stalled after one first down and punted back to Notre Dame with 6:25 remaining in the game. The Irish retook possession at their own 20-yard line and drove 80 yards in six plays, capping the series with a 30-yard Leonard-to-Greathouse touchdown pass and another successful two-point pass, this time from Jordan Faison to Beaux Collins. The Buckeyes quickly faced 3rd & 11 from their own 34-yard line but converted with a 57-yard pass from Howard to Smith, advancing to the Notre Dame 9-yard line in time for the two-minute timeout. From there, the Buckeyes took the clock down to 28 seconds before attempting a 33-yard field goal, which Fielding made. The Irish ran one final play, a loss of two yards, before the end of the game, finalizing a 34–23 national championship victory for the Buckeyes.

=== Scoring summary ===
2025 College Football Playoff National Championship

Quarter	1	2	3	4	Total
(8) No. 6 Ohio State	0	21	10	3	34
(7) No. 5 Notre Dame	7	0	8	8	23

at Mercedes-Benz Stadium • Atlanta, Georgia

- Date: January 20, 2025
- Game time: 7:48 p.m. EST
- Game weather: n/a (game played indoors, retractable roof closed)
- Game attendance: 77,660
- Referee: Steve Marlowe (SEC)
- TV announcers (ESPN): Chris Fowler (play-by-play), Kirk Herbstreit (analyst), Holly Rowe and Molly McGrath (sidelines)
- ESPN box score

Scoring summary

Quarter	Time	Drive			Team	Scoring information	Score	
Quarter	Time	Plays	Yards	TOP	Team	Scoring information	Ohio State	Notre Dame
1	5:15	18	75	9:45	Notre Dame	Riley Leonard 1-yard touchdown run, Mitch Jeter kick good	0	7
2	14:10	11	75	6:05	Ohio State	Jeremiah Smith 8-yard touchdown reception from Will Howard, Jayden Fielding kick good	7	7
2	6:15	10	76	6:06	Ohio State	Quinshon Judkins 9-yard touchdown run, Jayden Fielding kick good	14	7
2	0:27	12	80	4:26	Ohio State	Quinshon Judkins 6-yard touchdown reception from Will Howard, Jayden Fielding kick good	21	7
3	12:46	5	75	2:14	Ohio State	Quinshon Judkins 1-yard touchdown run, Jayden Fielding kick good	28	7
3	7:52	6	5	3:26	Ohio State	46-yard field goal by Jayden Fielding	31	7
3	3:03	10	75	4:49	Notre Dame	Jaden Greathouse 34-yard touchdown reception from Riley Leonard, 2-point pass good (Riley Leonard to Jeremiyah Love)	31	15
4	4:15	6	80	2:10	Notre Dame	Jaden Greathouse 30-yard touchdown reception from Riley Leonard, 2-point pass good (Jordan Faison to Beaux Collins)	31	23
4	0:26	9	61	3:49	Ohio State	33-yard field goal by Jayden Fielding	34	23
"TOP" = time of possession. For other American football terms, see Glossary of American football.							34	23

== Statistics ==
Team statistical comparison
Statistic	Ohio State	Notre Dame
First downs	22	19
First downs rushing	11	5
First downs passing	10	11
First downs penalty	1	3
Third down efficiency	9–12	5–12
Fourth down efficiency	0–0	3–4
Total plays–net yards	62–445	58–308
Rushing attempts–net yards	41–214	26–53
Yards per rush	5.2	2.0
Yards passing	231	255
Pass completions–attempts	17–21	22–32
Interceptions thrown	0	0
Punt returns–total yards	1–(−3)	1–10
Kickoff returns–total yards	1–6	0–0
Punts–average yardage	1–51.0	2–48.5
Fumbles–lost	1–1	1–0
Penalties–yards	6–58	3–30
Time of possession	32:25	27:35

Ohio State statistics
Buckeyes passing
	C–A	Yds	TD–INT
Will Howard	17–21	231	2–0
Buckeyes rushing
	Car	Yds	TD
Quinshon Judkins	11	100	2
Will Howard	16	57	0
TreVeyon Henderson	12	49	0
Emeka Egbuka	1	13	0
Jeremiah Smith	1	−5	0
Buckeyes receiving
	Rec	Yds	TD
Jeremiah Smith	5	88	1
Emeka Egbuka	6	64	0
Carnell Tate	2	35	0
Quinshon Judkins	2	21	1
Brandon Inniss	1	19	0
Gee Scott Jr.	1	4	0

Notre Dame statistics
Fighting Irish passing
	C–A	Yds	TD–INT
Riley Leonard	22–31	255	2–0
Steve Angeli	0–1	0	0–0
Fighting Irish rushing
	Car	Yds	TD
Riley Leonard	17	40	1
Jadarian Price	3	13	0
Jeremiyah Love	4	3	0
Jordan Faison	1	1	0
TEAM	1	−4	0
Fighting Irish receiving
	Rec	Yds	TD
Jaden Greathouse	6	128	2
Mitchell Evans	4	52	0
Beaux Collins	4	32	0
Eli Raridon	2	20	0
Kris Mitchell	2	16	0
Jordan Faison	1	6	0
Jeremiyah Love	2	5	0
Jayden Harrison	1	−4	0

== Aftermath ==
Both teams finished the season with a final record of 14–2. Ohio State quarterback Will Howard was named offensive most valuable player (MVP) after totaling 231 passing yards and two touchdowns, while Buckeyes linebacker Cody Simon was named defensive MVP for his eight-tackle game.

Ohio State finished the season unanimously ranked No. 1 in the AP poll, while Notre Dame was ranked No. 2; this was the highest end-of-season ranking for the Irish since 1993. Both teams' head coaches were honored with "coach of the year" awards: Marcus Freeman was given the Bobby Dodd Coach of the Year Award on December 31, 2024, and won the Paul "Bear" Bryant Award on January 22, 2025, while Ryan Day was named Super 11 Coach of the Year by the Football Writers Association of America on April 29, 2025.

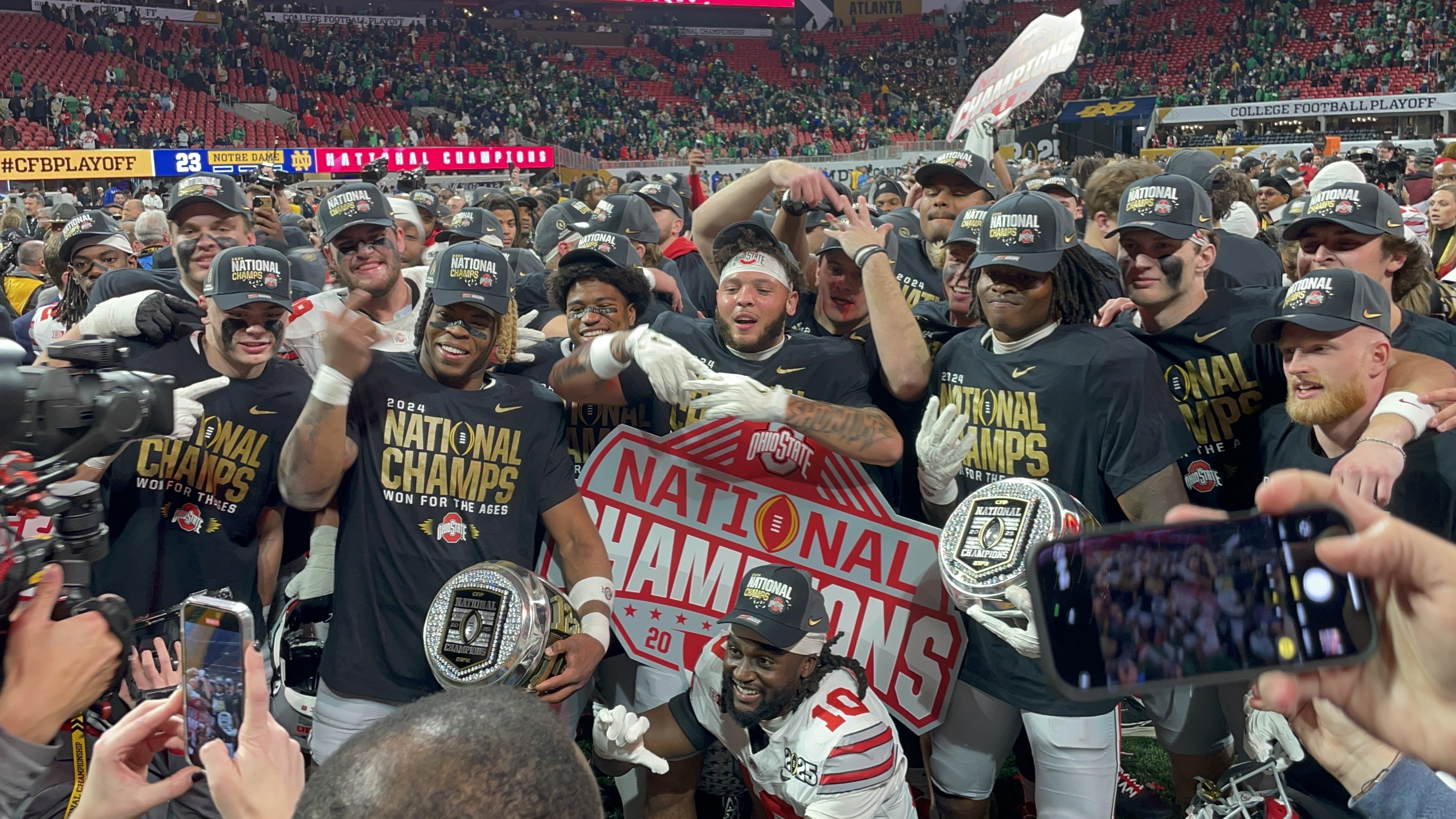
Ohio State players celebrate their victory on the field.

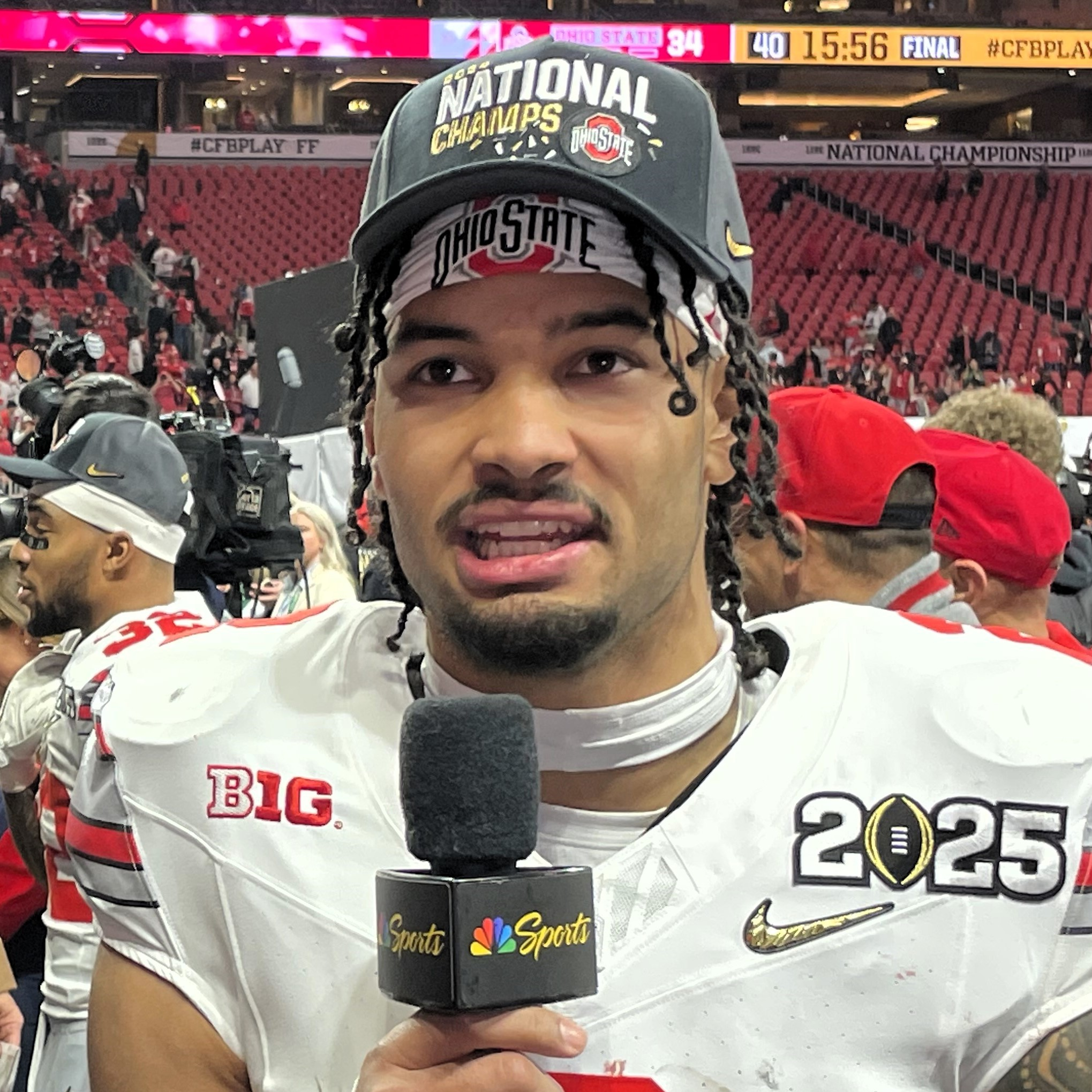
Emeka Egbuka talking to media

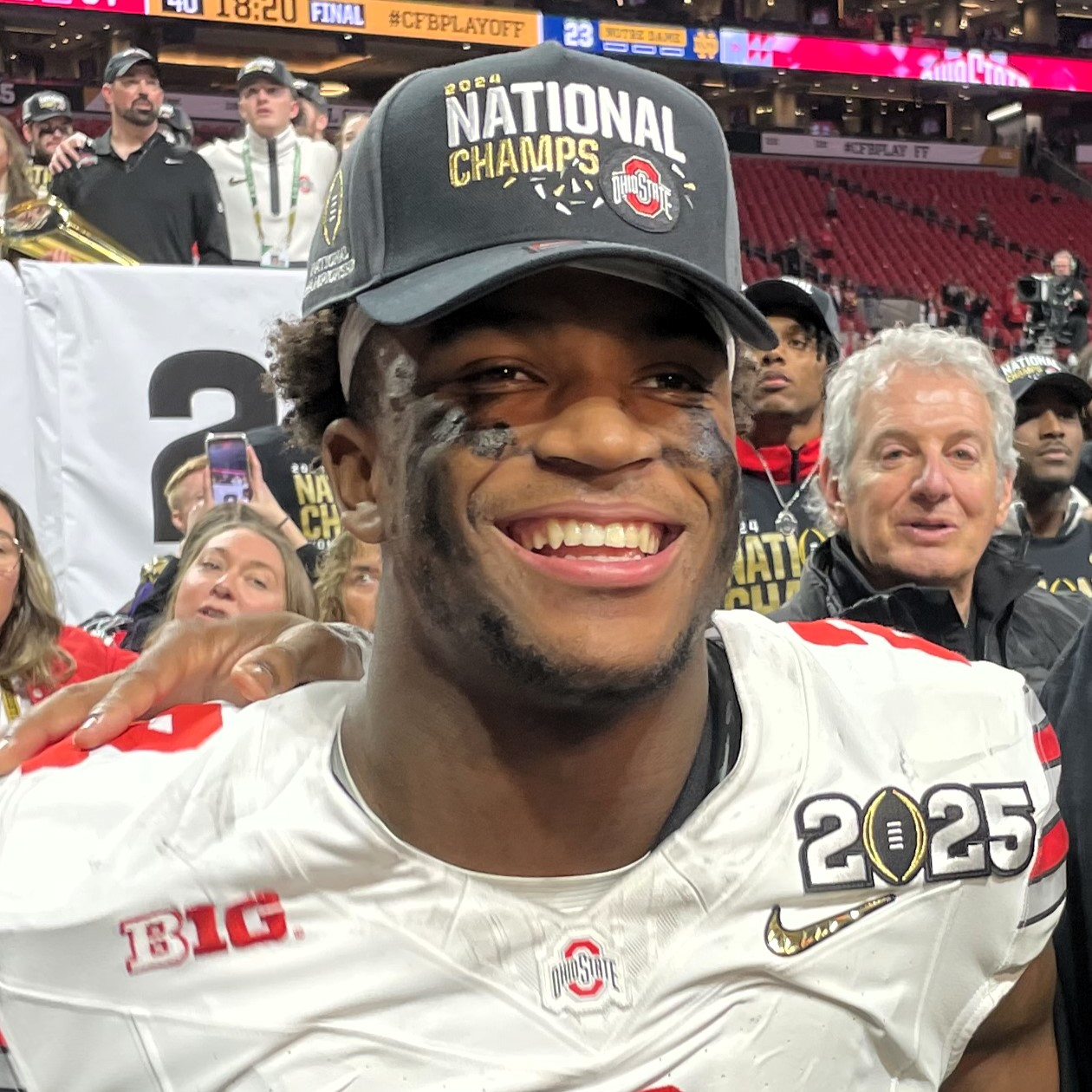
Caleb Downs celebrates

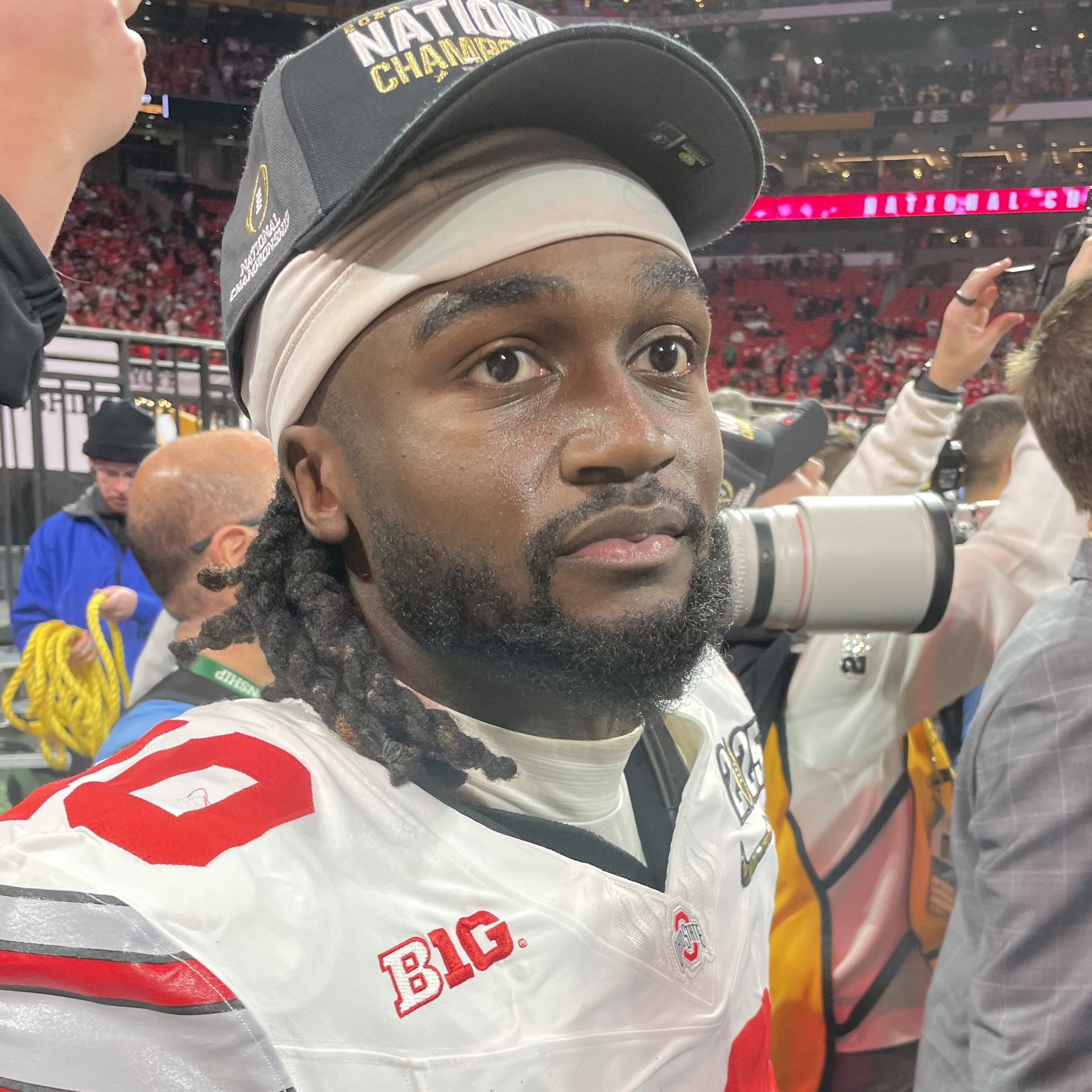
Denzel Burke

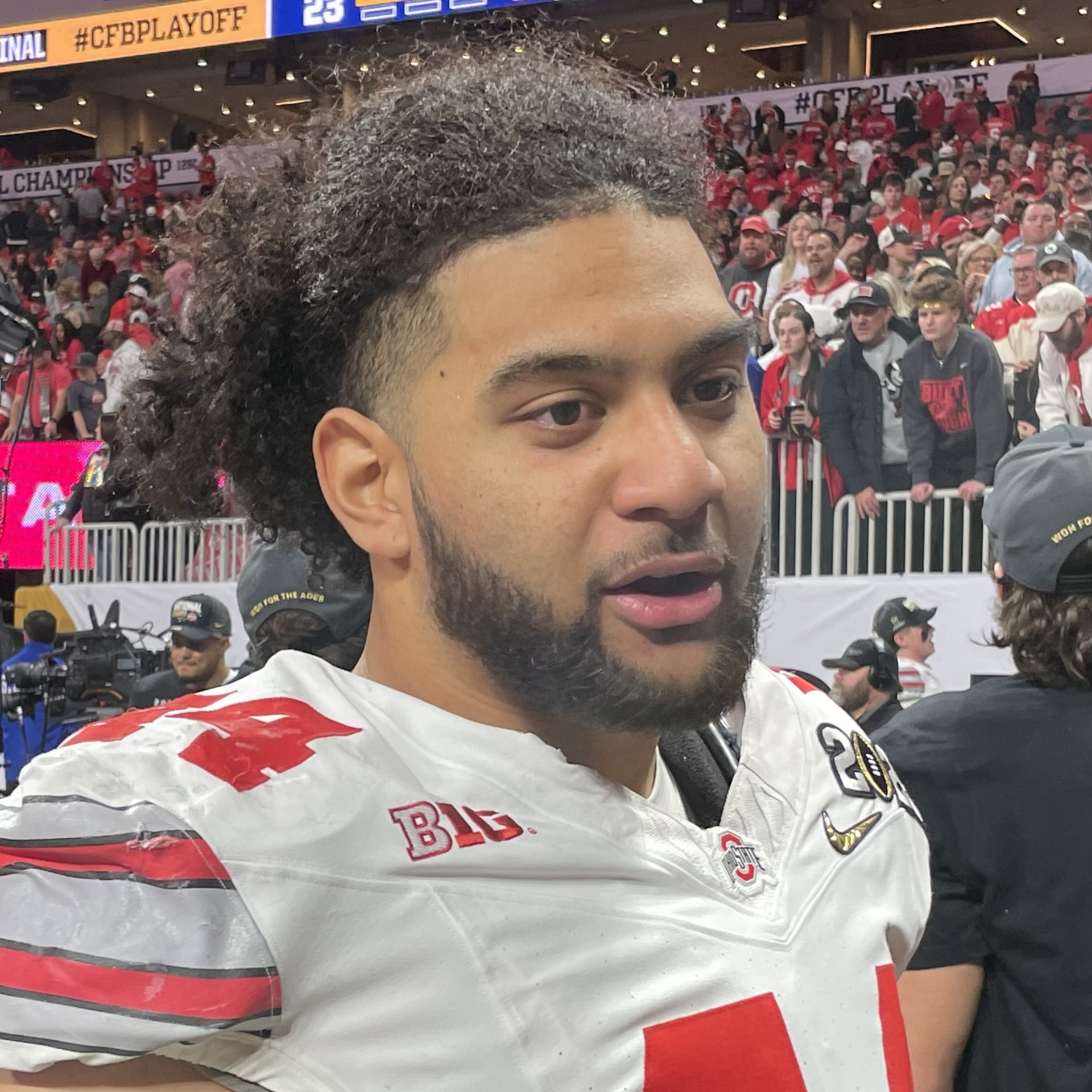
JT Tuimoloau talks to media

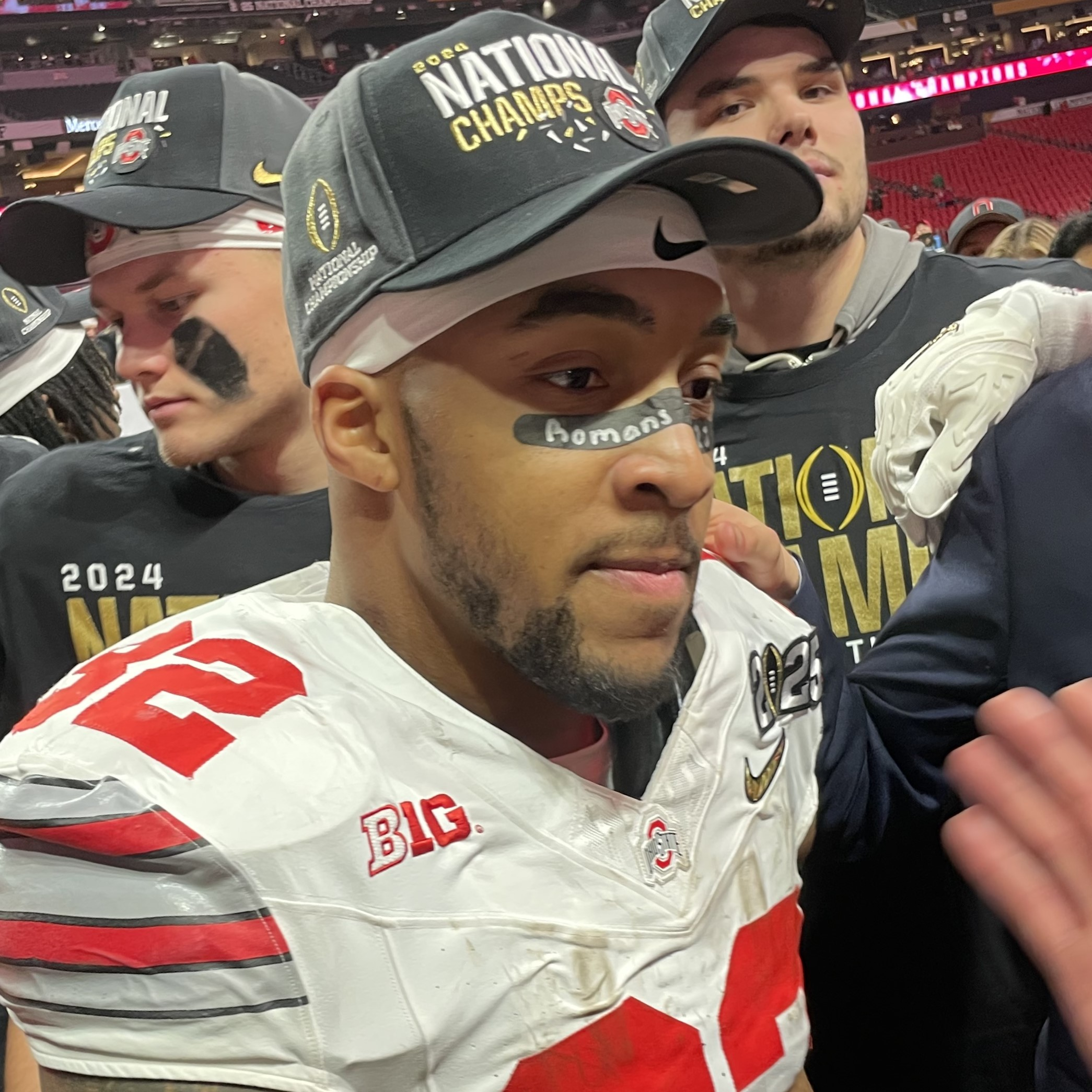
TreVeyon Henderson talks to media

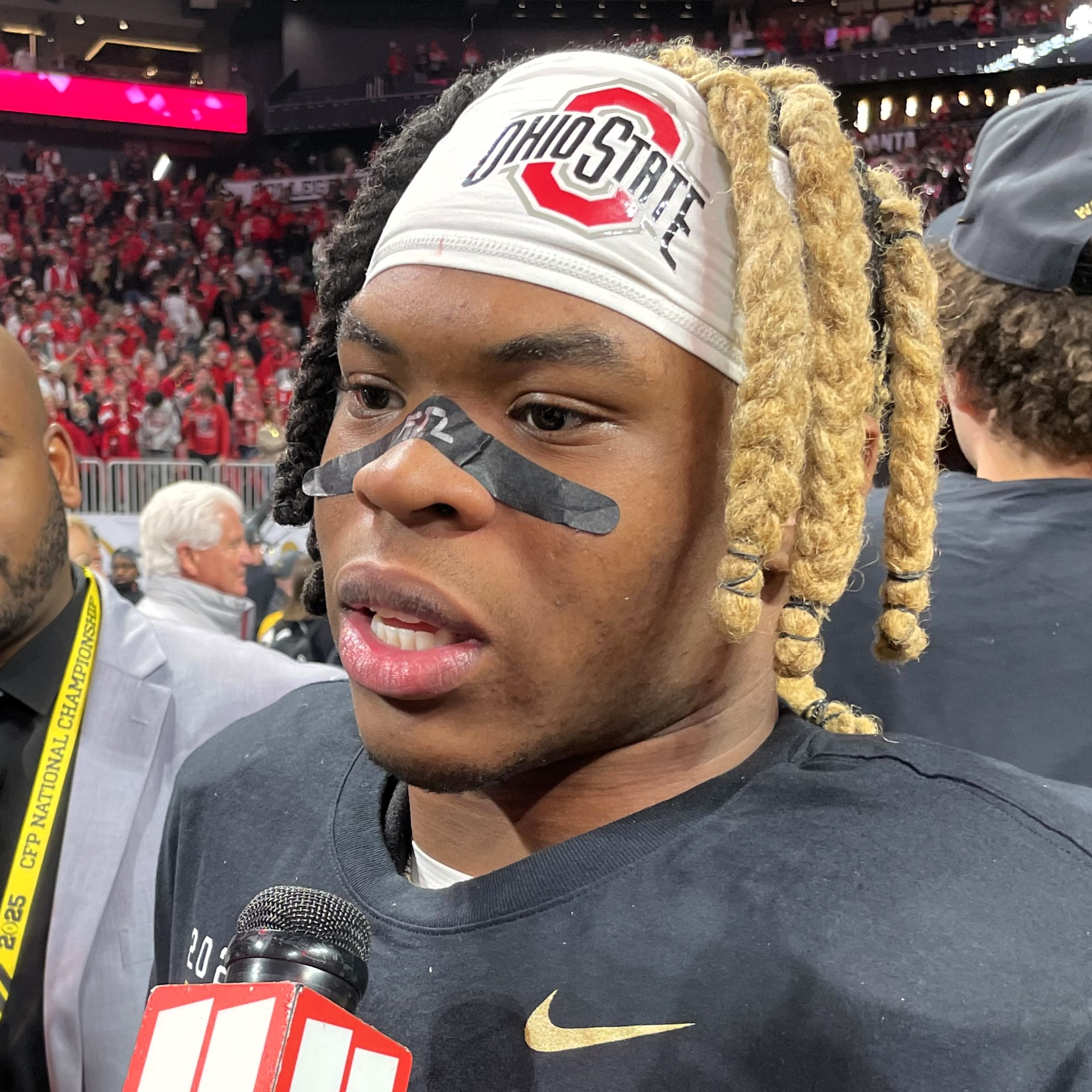
Quinshon Judkins talks to media

Players celebrate with trophy, hold up banner "OHIO AGAINST THE WORLD"

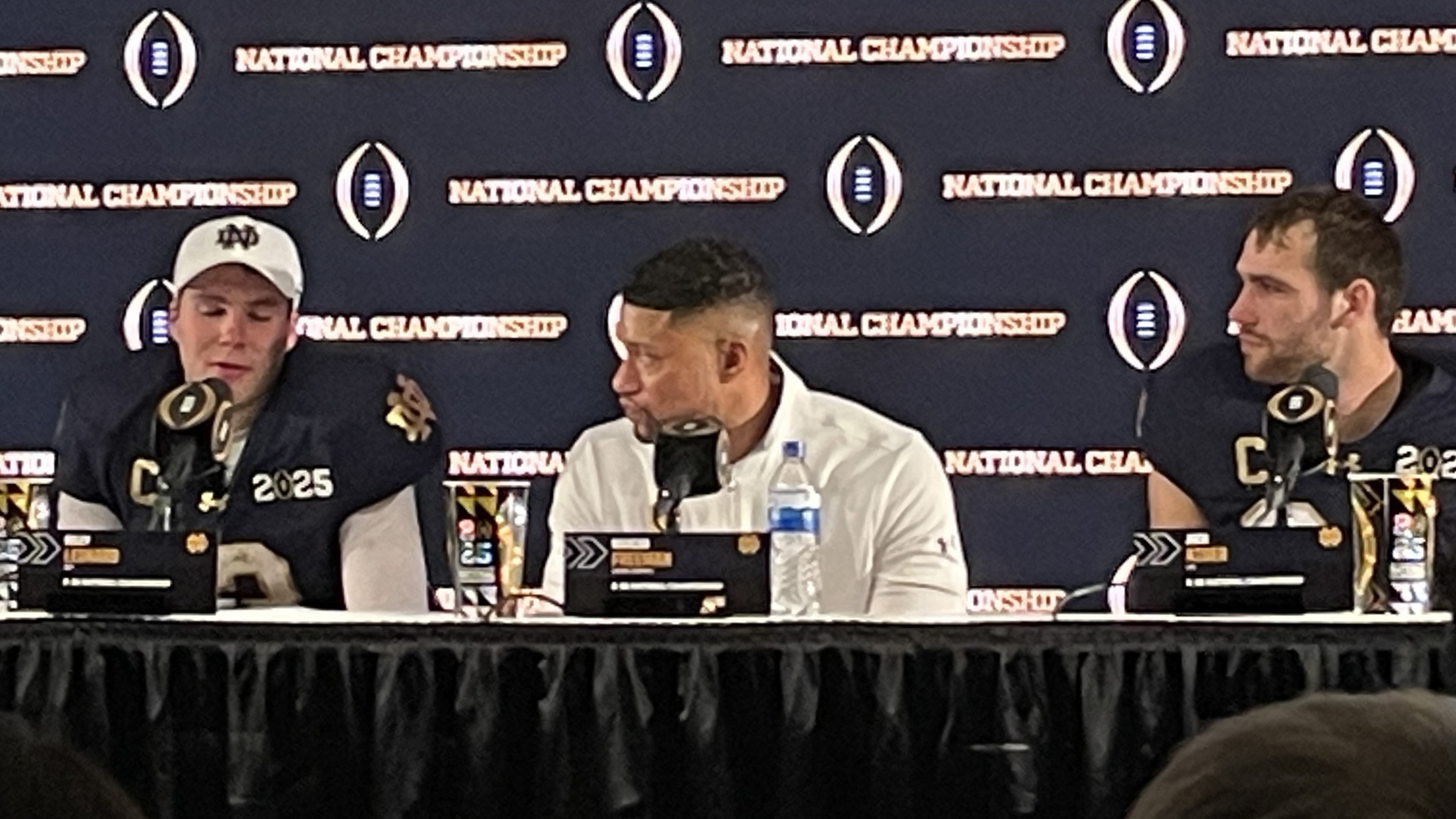
Notre Dame's post-game press conference with Riley Leonard, head coach Marcus Freeman, and Jack Kiser.

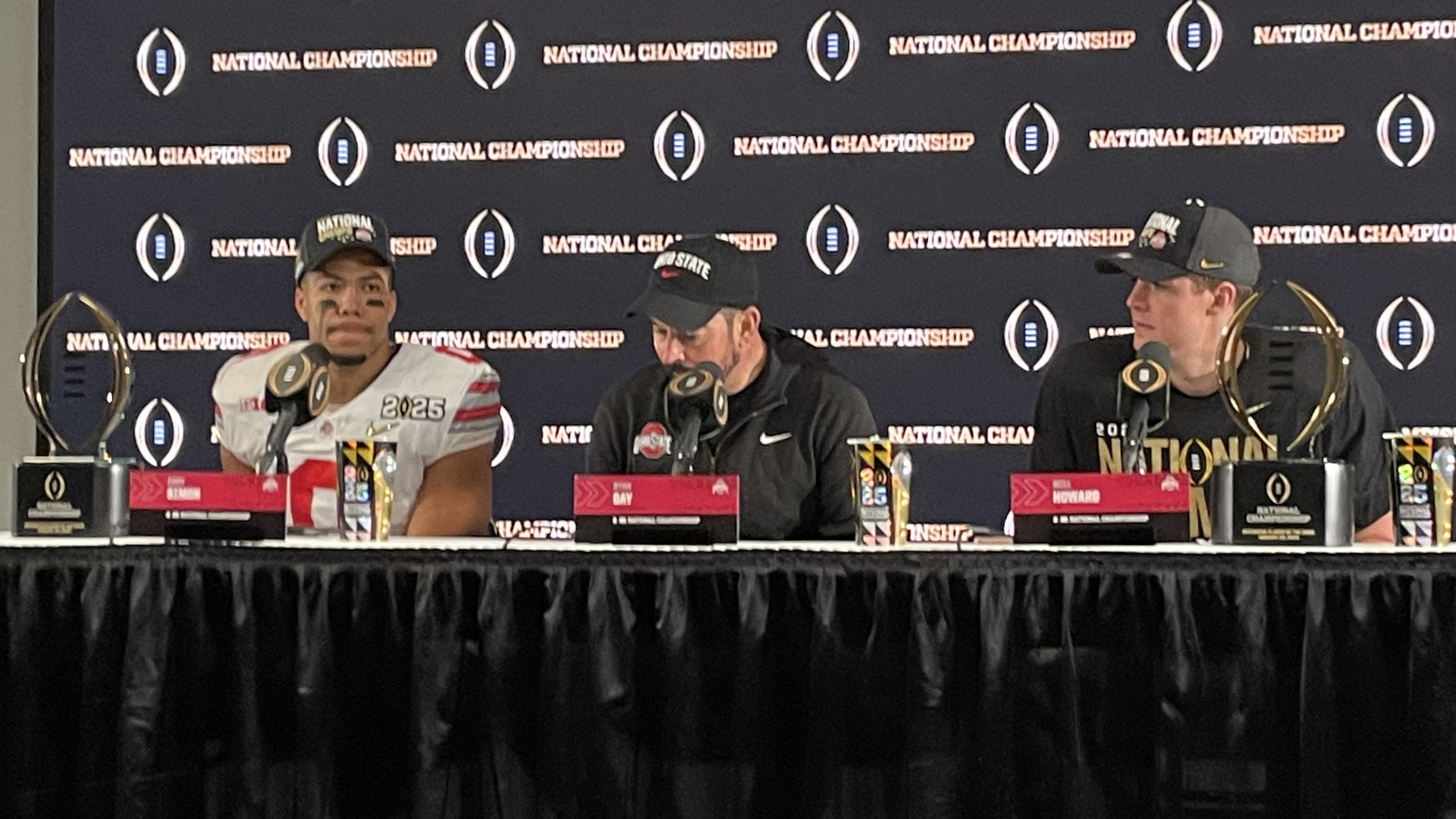
Ohio State's post-game press conference with defensive MVP Cody Simon, head coach Ryan Day, and offensive MVP Will Howard.
All photos from stadium after the game.

== See also ==
- College football national championships in NCAA Division I FBS
