= Jordan Faison =

American football and lacrosse player (born 2004)

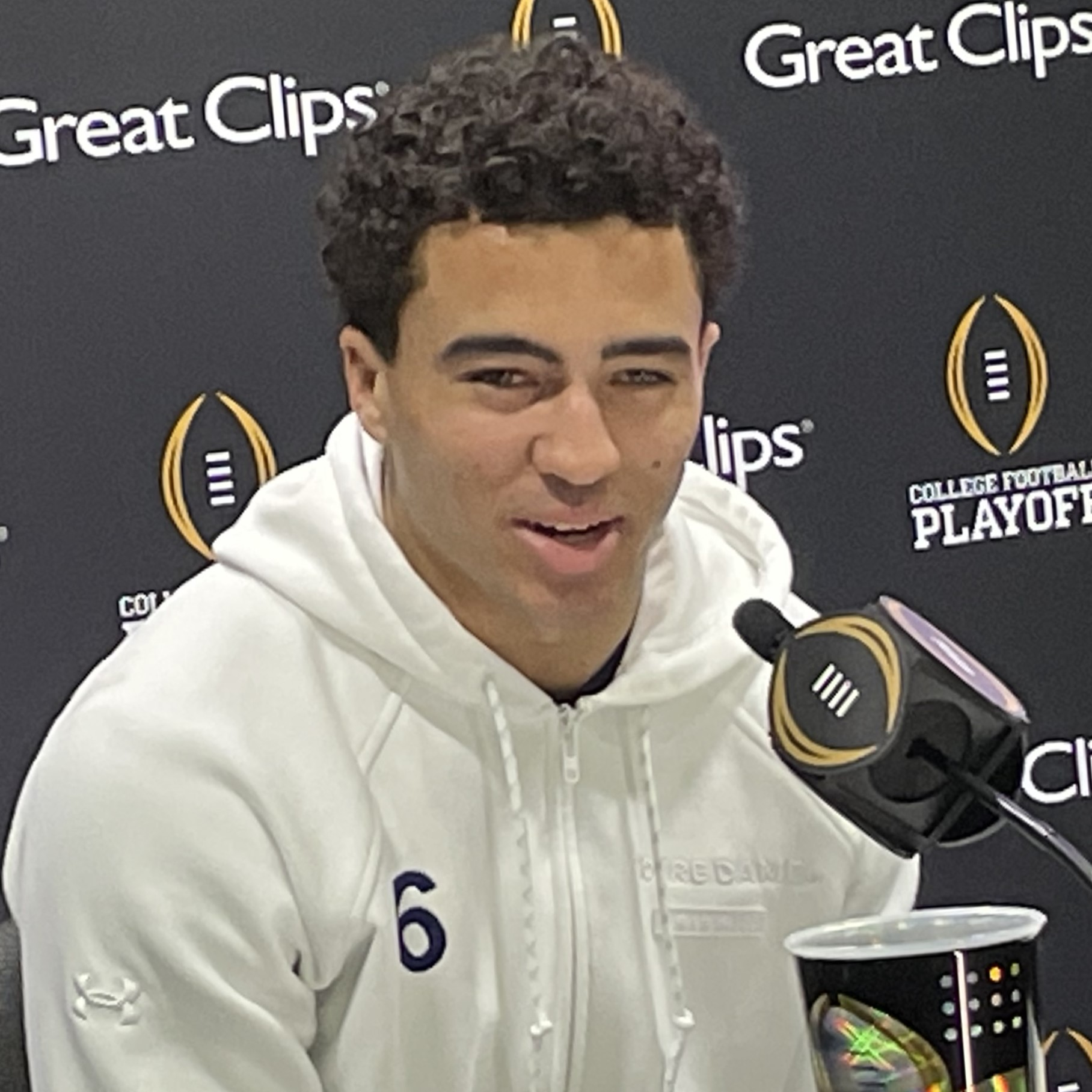
- Faison talking to press ahead of the 2025 CFP National Championship.

No. 6 – Notre Dame Fighting Irish
- Position: Wide receiver
- Class: Senior

Personal information
- Born: April 7, 2004 (age 22)
- Listed height: 5 ft 11 in (1.80 m)
- Listed weight: 185 lb (84 kg)

Career information
- High school: Pine Crest School (Fort Lauderdale, Florida)
- College: Notre Dame (2023–present)

Awards and highlights
- Sun Bowl MVP (2023)
- Stats at ESPN

Quincy Jordan Faison II (born April 7, 2004) is an American college football wide receiver for the Notre Dame Fighting Irish. He previously also played midfielder for the Notre Dame Fighting Irish lacrosse team.

== Early life ==
Faison grew up in Weston, Florida and attended the Pine Crest School, where he played basketball, lacrosse, and football. In football, he played safety and quarterback in Pine Crest's Wing T offense and accumulated 1,800 all-purpose yards and scored 26 total touchdowns as a senior. Faison was a three-time All-American in lacrosse.

== College career ==
Faison entered his freshman football season at Notre Dame as a walk-on before earning a football scholarship midway through the season. He was named the MVP of the 2023 Sun Bowl after catching five passes for 115 yards and a touchdown in a 48–8 win over Oregon State. Faison finished his freshman football season with 19 receptions for 322 yards and four touchdowns.

Faison was a starting midfielder in his freshman season with the Notre Dame Fighting Irish men's lacrosse team and scored 22 goals. He scored a goal in Notre Dame's 15–5 victory in the 2024 National Championship game against Maryland. He retired from lacrosse in January 2026 to focus fully on football.

=== College football statistics ===
Year	Team	GP	Receiving			
Year	Team	GP	Rec	Yds	Avg	TD
2023	Notre Dame	7	19	322	16.9	4
2024	Notre Dame	13	30	356	11.9	1
2025	Notre Dame	12	49	640	13.1	4
2026	Notre Dame	3	13	173	13.3	2
Career		35	111	1,491	13.4	11

=== College lacrosse statistics ===
Year	Team	GP	G	A
2024	Notre Dame	17	22	8
2025	Notre Dame	12	9	5
Career		29	31	13
