= 2023 Sun Bowl =

Postseason college football bowl game

2023 Tony the Tiger Sun Bowl
- 90th Sun Bowl
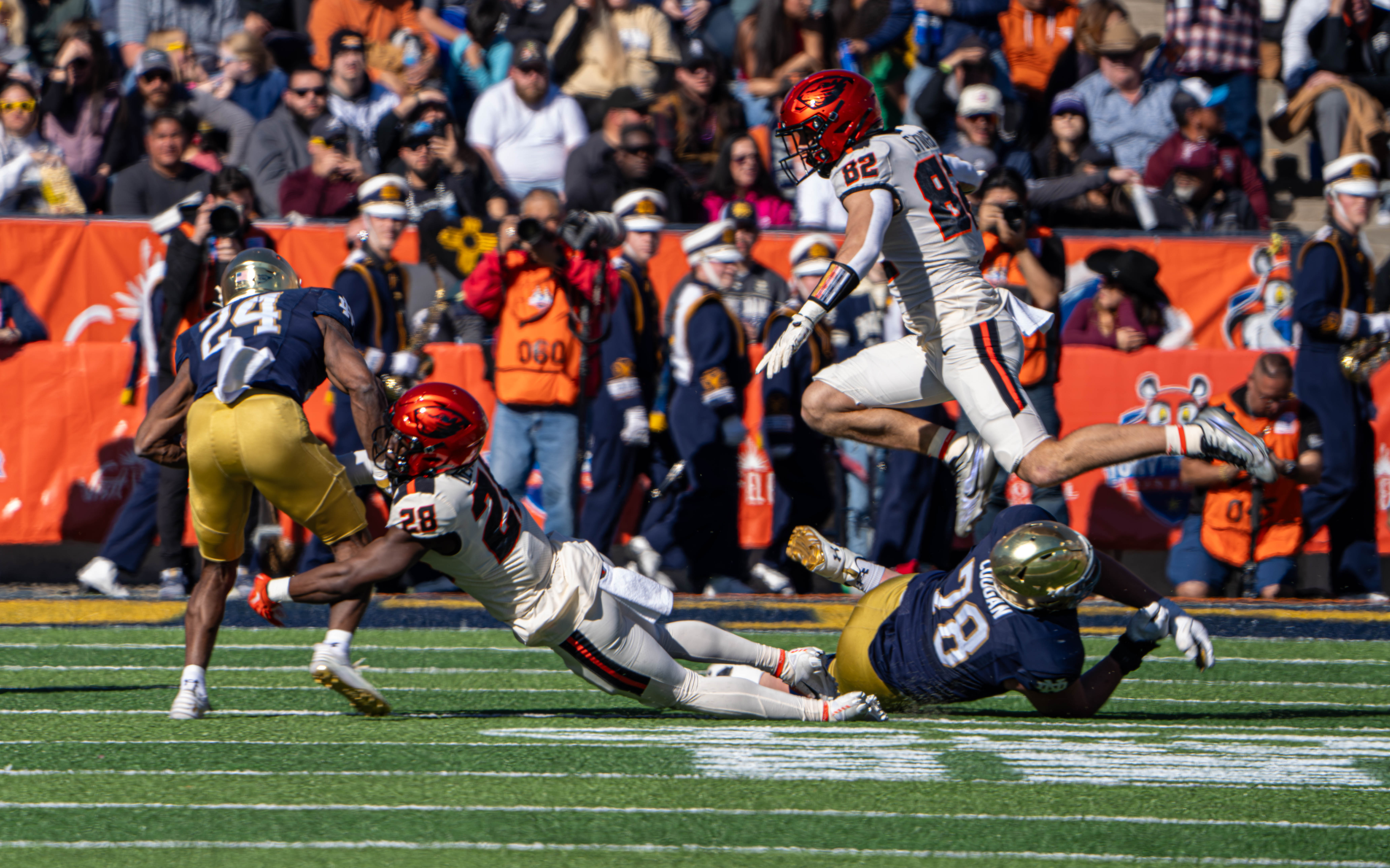
- Jadarian Price (left) carries the ball for Notre Dame during the 2023 Sun Bowl
Oregon State Beavers	Notre Dame Fighting Irish
(8–4)	(9–3)
Pac-12	Independent
8	40
Head coach: Kefense Hynson (interim)	Head coach: Marcus Freeman
AP / Coaches / CFP; 21 / 22 / 19	AP / Coaches / CFP; 15 / 16 / 16
	1	2	3	4	Total
Oregon State	0	0	0	8	8
Notre Dame	7	7	10	16	40
- Date: December 29, 2023
- Season: 2023
- Stadium: Sun Bowl
- Location: El Paso, Texas
- MVP: Jordan Faison (WR, Notre Dame)
- Favorite: Notre Dame by 8.5
- Referee: Scott Walker (SEC)
- Attendance: 48,223

United States TV coverage
- Network: CBS
- Announcers: Brad Nessler, Gary Danielson and Jenny Dell

The 2023 Sun Bowl was a college football bowl game played on December 29, 2023, at the Sun Bowl in El Paso, Texas. The 90th edition (89th playing) of the annual Sun Bowl game featured Oregon State from the Pac-12 Conference and Notre Dame, an FBS independent. The game began at approximately 12:00 p.m. MST and was aired on CBS. The Sun Bowl was one of the 2023–24 bowl games concluding the 2023 FBS football season. The game was sponsored by Frosted Flakes breakfast cereal, a brand of WK Kellogg Co, and was officially known as the Tony the Tiger Sun Bowl, referring to the cereal's mascot, Tony the Tiger.

== Teams ==
The bowl featured the Oregon State Beavers of the Pac-12 Conference and the Notre Dame Fighting Irish, an FBS independent. This was the first Sun Bowl to feature two teams ranked in the AP poll since the 2008 edition.

This was the third meeting between Oregon State and Notre Dame. The Beavers defeated the Fighting Irish in both prior meetings, the 2001 Fiesta Bowl and 2004 Insight Bowl.

=== Oregon State Beavers ===
The Beavers entered the game with an 8–4 record (5–4 in the Pac-12), tied for fourth place in their conference and ranked 19th in the College Football Playoff rankings.

This was Oregon State's third Sun Bowl; the Beavers previously won the 2006 edition and the aforementioned 2008 edition.

=== Notre Dame Fighting Irish ===
The Fighting Irish entered the game with a 9–3 record, ranked 16th in the College Football Playoff rankings. Notre Dame's regular season starting quarterback, Sam Hartman, opted out of the Sun Bowl to prepare for the 2024 NFL Draft.

This was Notre Dame's second Sun Bowl; the Fighting Irish previously won the 2010 edition.

== Game summary ==
2023 Tony the Tiger Sun Bowl

Quarter	1	2	3	4	Total
No. 19 Oregon State	0	0	0	8	8
No. 16 Notre Dame	7	7	10	16	40

at Sun Bowl • El Paso, Texas

- Date: December 29, 2023
- Game time: 12:00 p.m. MST
- Game weather: Sunny • Temperature: 50 °F (10 °C) • Wind: 2 mph (3.2 km/h) NE
- Game attendance: 48,223
- Referee: Scott Walker
- TV announcers (CBS): Brad Nessler, Gary Danielson and Jenny Dell
- Box score

Game information

First Quarter

- (6:47) UND – Jayden Thomas 8 yard pass from Steve Angeli, Spencer Shrader kick (Drive: 11 plays, 96 yards, 6:09; Notre Dame 7–0)

Second Quarter

- (0:27) UND – Jadarian Price 1 yard run, Spencer Shrader kick (Drive: 7 plays, 44 yards, 3:02; Notre Dame 14–0)

Third Quarter

- (9:43) UND – Spencer Shrader 44 yard field goal (Drive: 8 plays, 49 yards, 5:17; Notre Dame 17–0)
- (3:28) UND – Jordan Faison 13 yard pass from Steve Angeli, Spencer Shrader kick (Drive: 8 plays, 60 yards, 4:53; Notre Dame 24–0)

Fourth Quarter

- (10:55) UND – Team Safety (Drive: 1 plays, −1 yards, 0:29; Notre Dame 26–0)
- (9:08) UND – Jeremiyah Love 13 yard pass from Steve Angeli, Spencer Shrader kick (Drive: 3 plays, 72 yards, 1:47; Notre Dame 33–0)
- (6:02) OSU – Jimmy Valsin III 33 yard pass from Ben Gulbranson, Tyler Voltin run (Drive: 6 plays, 71 yards, 3:06; Notre Dame 33–8)
- (2:45) UND – Chase Ketterer 6 yard run, Spencer Shrader kick (Drive: 6 plays, 40 yards, 3:17; Notre Dame 40–8)

=== Statistics ===
Statistics	OSU	UND
First downs	10	24
Plays–yards	44–197	67–468
Rushes–yards	16–2	48–236
Passing yards	195	232
Passing: comp–att–int	17–28–1	15–19–0
Turnovers		
Time of possession	20:06	39:54

Team	Category	Player	Statistics
Oregon State	Passing	Ben Gulbranson	16/27, 180 yards, TD, INT
Oregon State	Rushing	Deshaun Fenwick	6 carries, 15 yards
Oregon State	Receiving	Jesiah Irish	3 catches, 56 yards
Notre Dame	Passing	Steve Angeli	15/19, 232 yards, 3 TD
Notre Dame	Rushing	Jadarian Price	13 carries, 106 yards, TD
Notre Dame	Receiving	Jordan Faison	5 catches, 115 yards, TD
