= Steve Angeli =

American football player (born 2003)

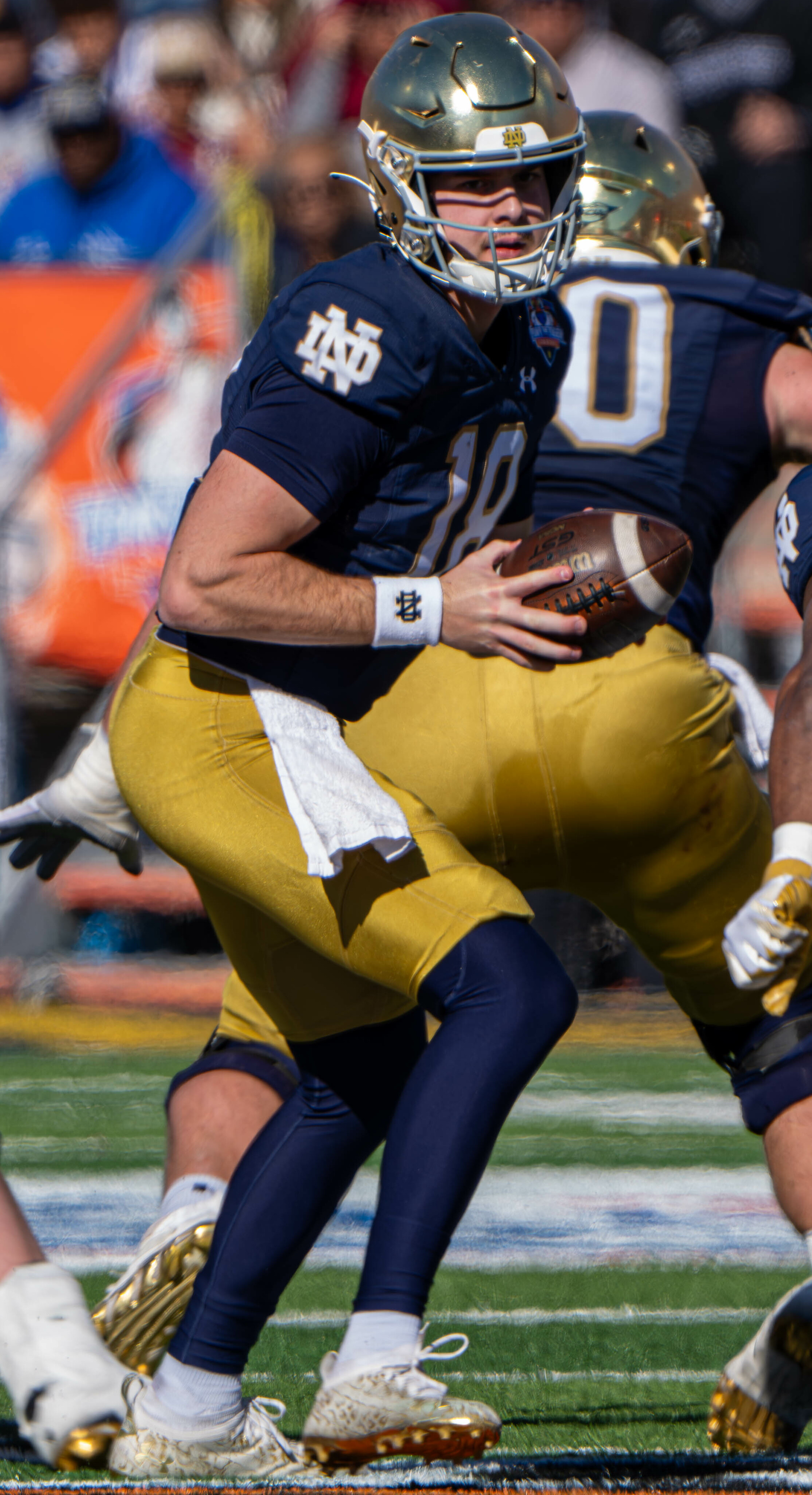
- Angeli at the 2023 Sun Bowl

No. 9 – Syracuse Orange
- Position: Quarterback
- Class: Fifth year

Personal information
- Born: November 18, 2003 (age 22)
- Listed height: 6 ft 3 in (1.91 m)
- Listed weight: 215 lb (98 kg)

Career information
- High school: Bergen Catholic (Oradell, New Jersey)
- College: Notre Dame (2022–2024); Syracuse (2025–present)
- Stats at ESPN

Steven Janos Angeli (born November 18, 2003) is an American college football quarterback for the Syracuse Orange of the Atlantic Coast Conference (ACC). He previously played for the Notre Dame Fighting Irish.

== Early life ==
Raised in Westfield, New Jersey, Angeli attended and played high school football at Bergen Catholic High School in Oradell, New Jersey, a school located 30 miles (48 km) from his hometown. He was considered a 3-star quarterback by 247Sports and Rivals.com, and a 4 star by ESPN.

== College career ==
=== Notre Dame ===
==== 2022 season ====
On October 22, 2022, Angeli made his collegiate debut against UNLV. Overall, Angeli appeared in two games in the 2022 season.

==== 2023 season ====
In 2023, Angeli was named the backup quarterback, behind Sam Hartman. He appeared in nine games and recorded 4 touchdowns and 1 interception for 272 passing yards.

On December 29, 2023, Angeli made his first collegiate start in the Sun Bowl. He threw for 232 yards and 3 touchdowns in a 40–8 win over Oregon State.

2024 Season

In the 2025 Orange Bowl against Penn State, Angeli replaced an injured Riley Leonard late in the second quarter and completed 6/7 passes for 44 yards, securing a field goal as the first half expired. Leonard would return in the second half and lead Notre Dame to a 27–24 victory.

=== Syracuse ===
Angeli transferred to Syracuse after Syracuse had finished its spring practice session. At Syracuse he rejoined with Nunzio Campanile and Fran Brown who he had prior close connections. He was named the starter over Rickie Collins who transferred from LSU. In week 4 against Clemson, Angeli tore his Achilles tendon and was ruled out for the remainder of the season. At the time of his injury, he was second in the FBS with 1,316 passing yards.

=== College statistics ===
Season	Team	Games			Passing								Rushing			
Season	Team	GP	GS	Record	Cmp	Att	Pct	Yds	Y/A	TD	Int	Rtg	Att	Yds	Avg	TD
2022	Notre Dame	2	0	—	Redshirt											
2023	Notre Dame	8	1	1–0	34	44	77.3	504	11.5	7	1	221.4	8	27	3.4	0
2024	Notre Dame	11	0	—	24	36	66.7	268	7.4	3	0	156.7	9	9	1.0	0
2025	Syracuse	4	4	3–1	98	156	62.8	1,316	8.4	10	2	152.3	23	−32	−1.4	1
2026	Syracuse	7	7	4–3	143	254	56.3	1,722	6.8	10	6	121.6	28	-20	-0.7	1
Career		32	12	8–4	299	490	61.0	3,811	7.8	30	9	142.9	68	-17	-0.3	2
