= 2025 Orange Bowl =

College Football Playoff Semifinal bowl game

2025 Capital One Orange Bowl
- College Football Playoff Semifinal; 91st Orange Bowl
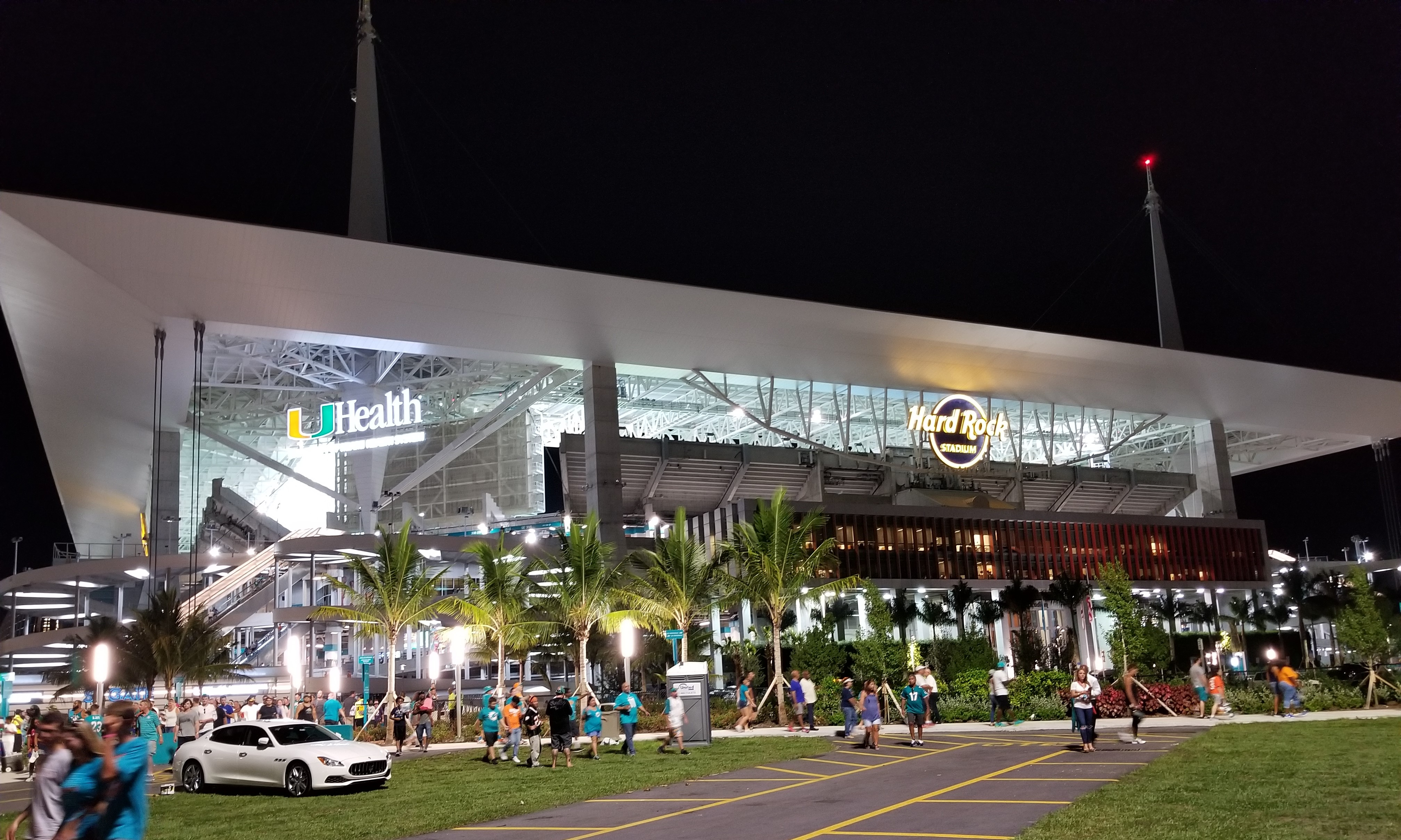
- Hard Rock Stadium in Miami Gardens, Florida, hosted the Orange Bowl.
Notre Dame Fighting Irish	Penn State Nittany Lions
(13–1)	(13–2)
Independent	Big Ten
27	24
Head coach: Marcus Freeman	Head coach: James Franklin
AP / Coaches / CFP; 3 / 3 / 5	AP / Coaches / CFP; 5 / 4 / 4
	1	2	3	4	Total
Notre Dame	0	3	7	17	27
Penn State	0	10	0	14	24
- Date: January 9, 2025
- Season: 2024
- Stadium: Hard Rock Stadium
- Location: Miami Gardens, Florida
- MVP: Riley Leonard (Notre Dame, QB); Christian Gray (Notre Dame, CB)
- Favorite: Penn State by 1.5
- National anthem: Ellie Rose
- Referee: Michael Vandervelde (Big 12)
- Halftime show: Nate Smith
- Attendance: 66,881

United States TV coverage
- Network: ESPN
- Announcers: Sean McDonough (play-by-play), Greg McElroy (analyst), Molly McGrath and Katie George (sidelines)

International TV coverage
- Network: ESPN Brazil and ESPN Deportes
- Announcers: ESPN Brazil: Matheus Pinheiro (play-by-play), Deivis Chiodini (analyst) and Giane Pessoa (rules analyst); ESPN Deportes: Ciro Procuna, Ramiro Pruneda and Sebastian M. Christensen

The 2025 Orange Bowl was a college football bowl game played on January 9, 2025, at Hard Rock Stadium in Miami Gardens, Florida. The 91st annual Orange Bowl was one of the 2024–25 bowl games concluding the 2024 FBS football season, along with one of the College Football Playoff's semifinal matches. The game featured the Notre Dame Fighting Irish and the Penn State Nittany Lions. The game began at approximately 7:30 p.m. EST and aired on ESPN. Sponsored by bank holding company Capital One, the game was officially known as the College Football Playoff Semifinal at the Capital One Orange Bowl.

== Background ==
The 2025 Orange Bowl was a semifinal game for the College Football Playoff (CFP). The game featured the winner of the Fiesta Bowl, Penn State, and the winner of the Sugar Bowl, Notre Dame. The winner of this game advanced to the 2025 College Football Playoff National Championship game to face Ohio State, the winner of the Cotton Bowl.

This was the 20th meeting between the Nittany Lions and the Fighting Irish; the teams were even in prior games, 9–9–1. Prior to this game, the teams had only met twice since 1993, when Penn State joined the Big Ten. The teams had met once before in a bowl game, the 1976 Gator Bowl, won by Notre Dame.

Quarterfinals
Dec 31 – Fiesta Bowl
3	Boise State	14
6	Penn State	31
Jan 2 – Sugar Bowl
2	Georgia	10
7	Notre Dame	23

Orange Bowl
6	Penn State	24
7	Notre Dame	27

== Teams ==
Each of the teams had appeared in five prior Orange Bowls; Penn State won four of their appearances, and Notre Dame won two of their appearances. The most recent prior Orange Bowl appearance for each team was January 2006 for Penn State (a win) and January 1996 for Notre Dame (a loss).

=== Penn State Nittany Lions ===
Penn State compiled an 11–1 record (8–1 in conference) during the regular season, losing only to Ohio State. The Nittany Lions qualified for the Big Ten Championship Game, which they lost to top-ranked Oregon. Penn State was then selected to compete in the CFP playoff; ranked fourth in the final CFP rankings, they received the sixth seed in the playoff bracket. Facing SMU in a first-round game, Penn State took a 28–0 lead into halftime en route to a 38–10 victory. Penn State then faced Boise State in the Fiesta Bowl, defeating the Broncos 31–14. The Nittany Lions entered the Orange Bowl with a 13–2 record.

=== Notre Dame Fighting Irish ===
Notre Dame entered the game with a 13–1 record. Their only loss was to Northern Illinois, on September 7. The Fighting Irish won a first-round playoff game over Indiana, then a quarterfinal game over Georgia, to reach this semifinal contest with Penn State.

== Game summary ==
=== First quarter ===
Penn state began the game receiving the opening kickoff and taking a touchback. On their second play from scrimmage during the first possession, Penn State's running back Nicholas Singleton gained 23 yards on a screen pass from Drew Allar, moving the ball into Notre Dame territory. However, after a 1-yard run, an incomplete pass, and a false start penalty pushed the Nittany Lions back, the drive stalled, and they were forced to punt from the Notre Dame 44 yard-line.

Notre Dame's offense started deep in its own territory at its 11 yard-line, and executed a number of short runs and passes to move the chains once. On the ensuing set of downs, Notre Dame faced a 3rd down and 7 from Notre Dame's own 25 yard-line, during which Riley Leonard connected with Mitchell Evans for a 32-yard gain. This pushed the Irish into Penn State territory, but the drive stalled. Notre Dame punted the ball, pinning Penn State at their own 2-yard line with 8:30 remaining in the quarter.

Penn State managed to gain breathing room out with a series of runs from Kaytron Allen that yielded another set of downs, but their drive ended after an incomplete pass on third down and 5 at their own 20 yard-line. Penn State punted the ball away with 5:56 remaining in the quarter. On the ensuing Notre Dame possession, Notre Dame ran two plays for a total of three yards before committing a false start and then throwing an interception to Penn State's Zakee Wheatley, setting up the Lions at their own 42 yard-line with 4:43 left in the quarter.

On the ensuing possession, Penn State drove deep into the red zone; at the end of the quarter, Penn state faced a 3rd down and goal from the 3 yard-line.

=== Second quarter ===
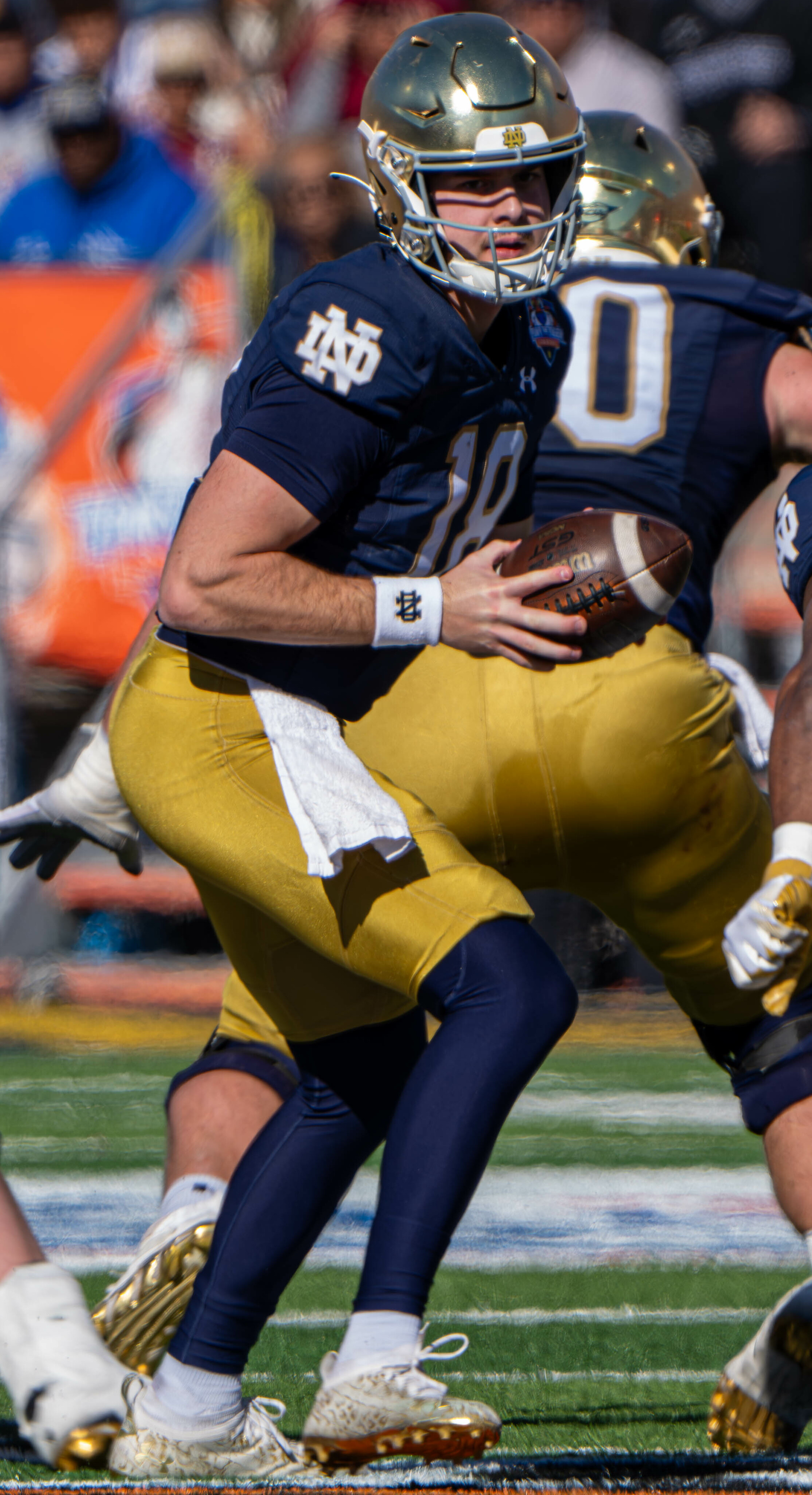
Backup quarterback Steve Angeli (pictured in 2023) came into the game after Riley Leonard was injured. He led the Fighting Irish on a drive that ended in a field goal, cutting down Penn State's lead to 10–3 as time expired in the half.

On the first play of the second quarter, a pass from Allar fell incomplete to Nicholas Singleton, and the Nittany Lions settled for a 20-yard field goal attempt by Ryan Barker. Barker connected on the kick, giving Penn State a 3–0 lead with less than ten seconds elapsed in the second quarter and capping off a 14-play, 55-yard drive by scoring the first points of the game.

The kickoff following the field goal resulted in a touchback, giving Notre Dame possession of the ball on its own 25 yard-line. Notre Dame got a first down, converting a third-and-2 from their own 33 yard-line with a quarterback run, and proceed to march to the 50 yard-line on ensuing plays. But after losing 4 yards on a run on a 2nd and 6 from midfield, and only gaining 3 yards on third down, Notre Dame punted the ball away to the Penn State 10 yard-line.

After the punt, Penn state had the ball with 9:35 remaining in the half. The Nittany Lions then went on a 15-play, 90-yard drive that consumed 7:17 of game clock. On the second play of that drive, Allen broke off a 20-yard run. Drew Allar converted a fourth down with a pass to Tyler Warren inside the red zone, keeping the drive alive. Three plays later, facing a 3rd and 3 from the Notre Dame 5 yard-line, Singleton punched in a 7-yard touchdown run and Ryan Barker converted the extra point to extend the lead to 10–0.

Notre Dame took a touchback on the ensuing kickoff. The Fighting Irish began the drive with short passes from Leonard to Aneyas Williams and Evans to move the chains. During the drive, Leonard was removed after taking a hit from Zane Durant and Dvon J-Thomas, and backup Steve Angeli entered the game. Beginning on the fourth play of the drive, with a 2nd and 10 from Notre Dame's own 40 yard-line with 1:39 remaining in the game, Angeli and the Irish marched down the field, converting three third downs and moving into Penn State's red zone. But after Angeli was sacked by Abdul Carter, Notre Dame called a timeout with two seconds left in the half. Notre Dame's Mitch Jeter then drilled a 41-yard field goal, cutting Penn State's lead to 10–3 at halftime.

=== Third quarter ===
The Fighting Irish received the second half kickoff and took a touchback. Leonard returned to the game, being cleared after going through concussion protocol. After incurring a delay of game penalty prior to their first play from scrimmage, running back Jeremiyah Love provided a spark, gaining 24 yards on four consecutive carries. After Jadrian Price converted a 2nd and 1, Notre Dame had the ball at their own 45 yard-line with 13:20 remaining in the quarter. Leonard then threw a 36-yard pass to Williams, which followed by a 15-yard run by Williams to set up 1st and goal at the 4 yard-line. After gaining one yard on 1st and goal, Leonard capped the drive off with a 3-yard touchdown run, tying the game at 10 after Jeter's successful extra point with 10:46 remaining in the quarter.

The next few possessions resulted in several punts being exchanged by the two teams. Penn state received the kickoff following the touchdown, with returner Singleton running the ball back to Penn State's own 22 yard-line, but went three-and-out, punting the ball away to Notre Dame's 30 yard-line. Notre Dame's Leonard completed an 11-yard pass to Jordan Faison, but the drive stalled. Facing a 4th down and 10 from their own 41 yard-line, Notre Dame punted the ball away to the Penn State 15 yard-line. And after Allar completed a 1st down pass from his own 15 yard-line to Tyler Warren, for a gain 22 yards, a Rod Heard II sack of Allar on the ensuing set of downs forced Penn State to punt the ball away again, this time to Notre Dame's 28 yard-line after an 8-yard return by Max Hurleman with 4:26 remaining in the quarter.

On the ensuing possession, Notre Dame converted several third downs to keep their drive alive. Facing a chains on a 3rd and 1 from their own 37 yard-line, Leonard ran it himself for a two-yard game. On the following set of downs, facing a 3rd and 9 from Notre Dame's own 40 yard-line, Leonard connected on a 17-yard pass to Jaden Greathouse. And, at the time the quarter ended, Notre Dame faced down a 3rd and 1 from the Penn State 34 yard-line.

=== Fourth quarter ===
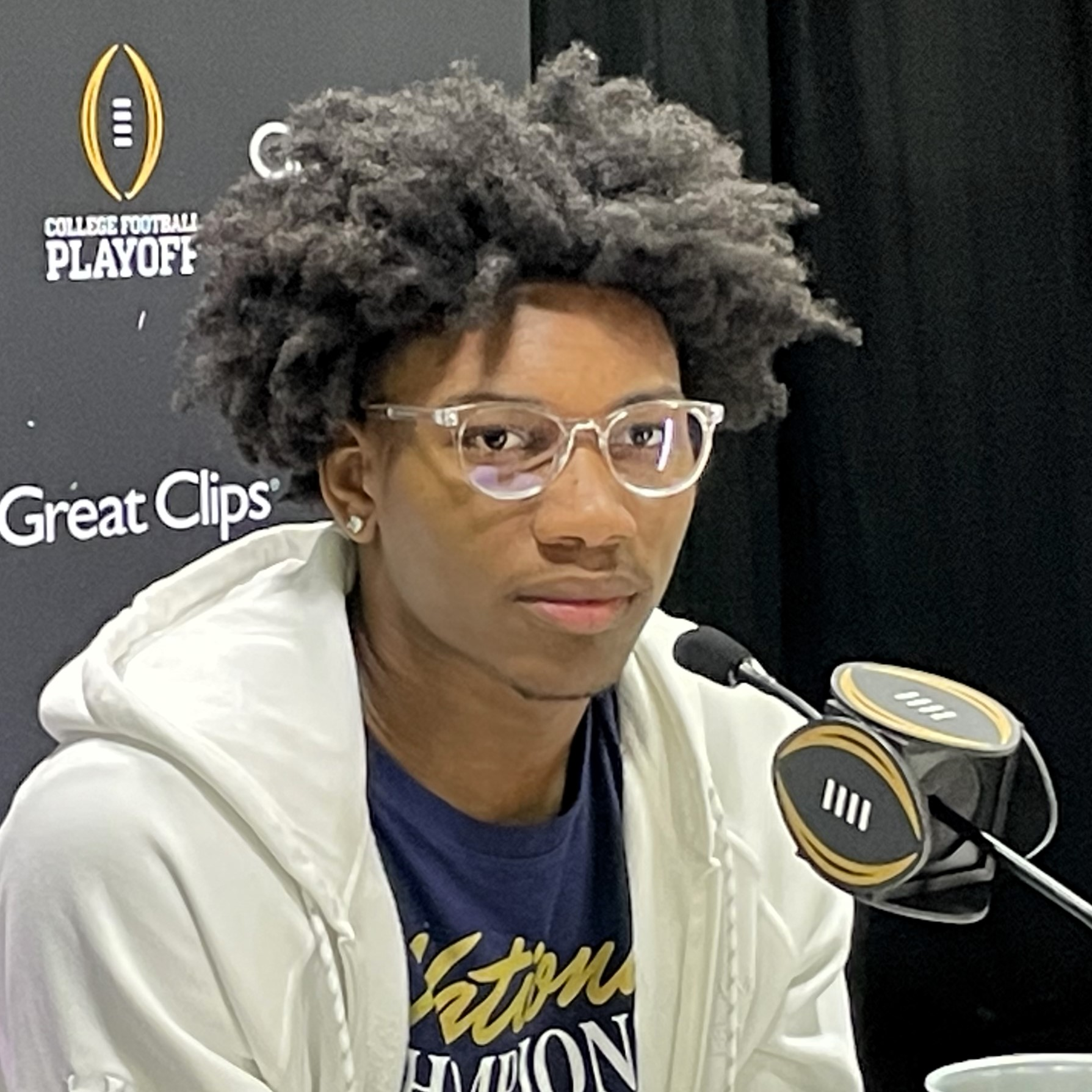
Christian Gray had the critical late interception of Penn State quarterback Drew Allar.

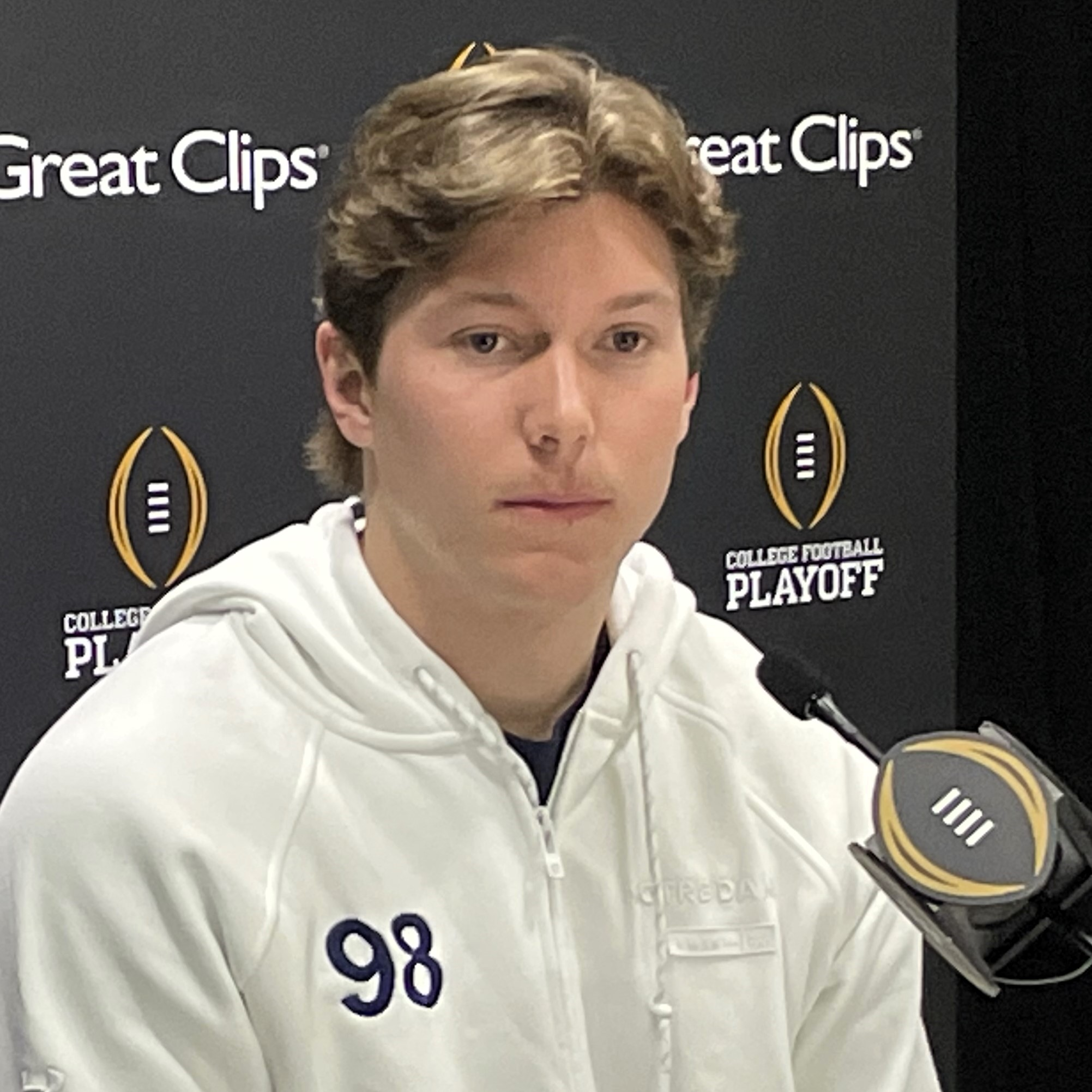
Mitch Jeter's 41-yard field goal gave the Fighting Irish a 27–24 lead with 7 seconds remaining in the game

The Fighting Irish began the fourth quarter with a 16-yard run by Jayden Thomas, entering the red zone with a 1st and 10 from Penn State's 16 yard-line. On the following play, Penn State's Kobe King was penalized for pass interference on an attempt from Leonard to Eli Raridon, moving the ball to the 2 and giving the Irish a 1st and goal. Love fought through several defenders in an impressive show of effort to punch the next play in for a touchdown, and Jeter converted the try, giving Notre Dame its first lead of the game at a score of 17–10 with 14:07 to go in the game.

After Penn State took a fair catch on the ensuing kickoff, the Nitanny Lions offense responded. The first play of the drive was a 27-yard pass from Allar to Warren, moving the ball to Notre Dame's 48 yard-line. Penn State marched down the field on passes by Allar and runs by Allar and Allen, with Singleton punching in a 2nd and goal from the Notre Dame 7 yard-line, tying the game at 17 with 10:20 to go following the successful conversion by Barker.

Notre Dame took a touchback on the following kickoff and, on the first play from scrimmage, threw an interception to Penn State's Dani Dennis-Sutton, giving the Nittany Lions a 1st and 10 from Notre Dame's 39 yard-line. Taking advantage of the turnover, Singleton would score a touchdown for Penn State on the fifth play of the ensuing offensive possession. And, following the extra point, Penn State led the Irish 24–17 with 7:55 to go.

After Harrison returned the kickoff to Notre Dame's own 19 yard-line, Notre Dame began its possession by losing 4 yards on a run to Jadarian Price. After Leonard then fired off a series of completed passes to Greathouse and Love, and Leonard ran the ball himself, Notre Dame was faced with a 1st and 10 from its own 44 yard-line. Love took the following play for a 2-yard gain, and the Irish scored on the next play after Leonard completed a 54-yard pass to Greathouse, capping off a 7-play, 81-yard drive. Jeter's extra point tied the game at 24, with 4:38 left to play.

Penn State went three-and-out following the kickoff (another touchback); Nicholas Singleton committed a false start on 1st down, and the Nittany lions had faced a 4th and 3 from their own 32. Notre Dame took possession of the football at their own 34 yard-line with 2:34 remaining in the game. The Irish ran one play, an 8-yard run by Price, prior to the two-minute timeout. The second down run, by Love, was stopped a yard short of a first down; Leonard converted the ensuing 3rd down on his feet. On the next play from scrimmage, Leonard appeared to have been sacked by Abdul Carter, but an illegal hands to the face penalty committed by Zane Durant nullified the sack and gave Notre Dame a 1st and 10 at the Penn State 49 yard-line. Leonard ran for five yards on 1st down, but threw an incompletion on 2nd down and took a sack from Coziah Izzard on 3rd down. Facing a 4th and 9 at the Penn State 48, and following Penn State's first timeout, Notre Dame's James Rendell punted the ball away to the Penn State 15 yard-line.

Penn State's next drive was quite short, and ended in a turnover with about half-a-minute remaining in the game. After Singleton ran the ball to Penn State's 28 yard-line on the first play of the possession, securing a first down, Penn State quarterback Allar threw an interception to Notre Dame's Christian Gray. The Fighting Irish took possession of the ball at Penn State's 42 yard-line following the interception.

The Irish took advantage of the turnover, scoring a field goal on the ensuing possession. Leonard began the possession with a five-yard run to Penn State's 37 and, following a Notre Dame timeout, ran for two yards on second down to the Penn State 35. Notre Dame called timeout before facing a 3rd and 3, which the Irish converted on a 10-yard pass from Leonard to Greathouse. After this, Notre Dame threw an incomplete pass, and then ran the ball twice for a net gain of two yards; Penn State used a timeout after each run. On 4th and 8 at the Penn State 23, Jeter connected on a 41-yard field goal, giving the Fighting Irish a 27–24 lead with 7 seconds remaining in the game.

Penn State took possession of the ball following a touchback on the post-field goal kickoff, and ran two plays before the game expired—an incomplete pass on 1st and 10, and a play involving a series of laterals on 2nd down as the clock expired that ended when the ball was thrown out of bounds. Notre Dame had won the Orange Bowl, with Jeter's field goal providing the decisive score.

2025 Capital One Orange Bowl

Quarter	1	2	3	4	Total
(7) No. 5 Notre Dame	0	3	7	17	27
(6) No. 4 Penn State	0	10	0	14	24

at Hard Rock Stadium • Miami Gardens, Florida

- Date: Thursday, January 9, 2025
- Game time: 7:45 p.m. EST
- Game weather: Sunny • Temperature: 56 °F (13 °C)
- Game attendance: 66,881
- Referee: Michael VanderVelde
- TV announcers (ESPN): Sean McDonough (play-by-play), Greg McElroy (analyst), Molly McGrath and Katie George (sidelines)
- Box score

Game information

First quarter

- No scoring.

Second quarter

- (14:52) PSU – Ryan Barker 20-yard field goal (Drive: 14 plays, 55 yards, 4:51; Penn State 3–0)
- (2:18) PSU – Nicholas Singleton 5-yard run, Ryan Barker kick (Drive: 15 plays, 90 yards, 7:17; Penn State 10–0)
- (0:00) ND – Mitch Jeter 41-yard field goal (Drive: 13 plays, 52 yards, 2:18; Penn State 10–3)

Third quarter

- (10:46) ND – Riley Leonard 3-yard run, Mitch Jeter kick (Drive: 8 plays, 75 yards, 4:14; Tied 10–10)

Fourth quarter

- (14:07) ND – Jeremiyah Love 2-yard run, Mitch Jeter kick (Drive: 10 plays, 71 yards, 5:19; Notre Dame 17–10)
- (10:20) PSU – Nicholas Singleton 7-yard run, Ryan Barker kick (Drive: 7 plays, 75 yards, 3:47; Tied 17–17)
- (7:55) PSU – Nicholas Singleton 7-yard run, Ryan Barker kick (Drive: 5 plays, 39 yards, 2:20; Penn State 24–17)
- (4:38) ND – Jaden Greathouse 54-yard pass from Riley Leonard, Mitch Jeter kick (Drive: 7 plays, 81 yards, 3:17; Tied 24–24)
- (0:07) ND – Mitch Jeter 41-yard field goal (Drive: 7 plays, 19 yards, 0:26; Notre Dame 27–24)

Scoring summary

Quarter	Time	Drive			Team	Scoring information	Score	
Quarter	Time	Plays	Yards	TOP	Team	Scoring information	Notre Dame	Penn State
"TOP" = time of possession. For other American football terms, see Glossary of American football.								

=== Statistics ===
Team statistical comparison
Statistic	Notre Dame	Penn State
First downs	23	20
First downs rushing	10	11
First downs passing	11	7
First downs penalty	2	2
Third down efficiency	11–17	3–11
Fourth down efficiency	0–0	2–2
Total plays–net yards	73–383	65–339
Rushing attempts–net yards	42–116	42–204
Yards per rush	2.8	4.9
Yards passing	267	135
Pass completions–attempts	21–31	12–23
Interceptions thrown	2	1
Punt returns–total yards	2–8	1–0
Kickoff returns–total yards	5–323	4–260
Punts–average yardage	4–157	5–210
Fumbles–lost	1–0	1–0
Penalties–yards	4–31	5–44
Time of possession	45:00	35:26

Notre Dame statistics
Fighting Irish passing
	C–A	Yds	TD–INT
Riley Leonard	15–23	223	1–2
Steve Angeli	6–7	44	0–0
Fighting Irish rushing
	Car	Yds	TD
Jeremiyah Love	11	45	1
Riley Leonard	18	35	1
Jayden Thomas	1	18	0
Aneyas Williams	2	17	0
Jadarian Price	7	13	0
Fighting Irish receiving
	Rec	Yds	TD
Jaden Greathouse	7	105	1
Aneyas Williams	5	66	0
Mitchell Evans	5	58	0
Jordan Faison	2	25	0
Kris Mitchell	1	7	0
Jeremiyah Love	1	6	0

Penn State statistics
Nittany Lions passing
	C–A	Yds	TD–INT
Drew Allar	12–23	135	0–1
Nittany Lions rushing
	Car	Yds	TD
Nicholas Singleton	15	84	3
Kaytron Allen	19	82	0
Tyler Warren	2	21	0
Drew Allar	6	17	0
Nittany Lions receiving
	Rec	Yds	TD
Tyler Warren	6	75	0
Nicholas Singleton	2	33	0
Khalil Dinkins	2	21	0
Luke Reynolds	1	7	0
Kaytron Allen	1	6	0
Harrison Wallace III	0	-3	0
Drew Allar	0	-4	0

== Aftermath ==
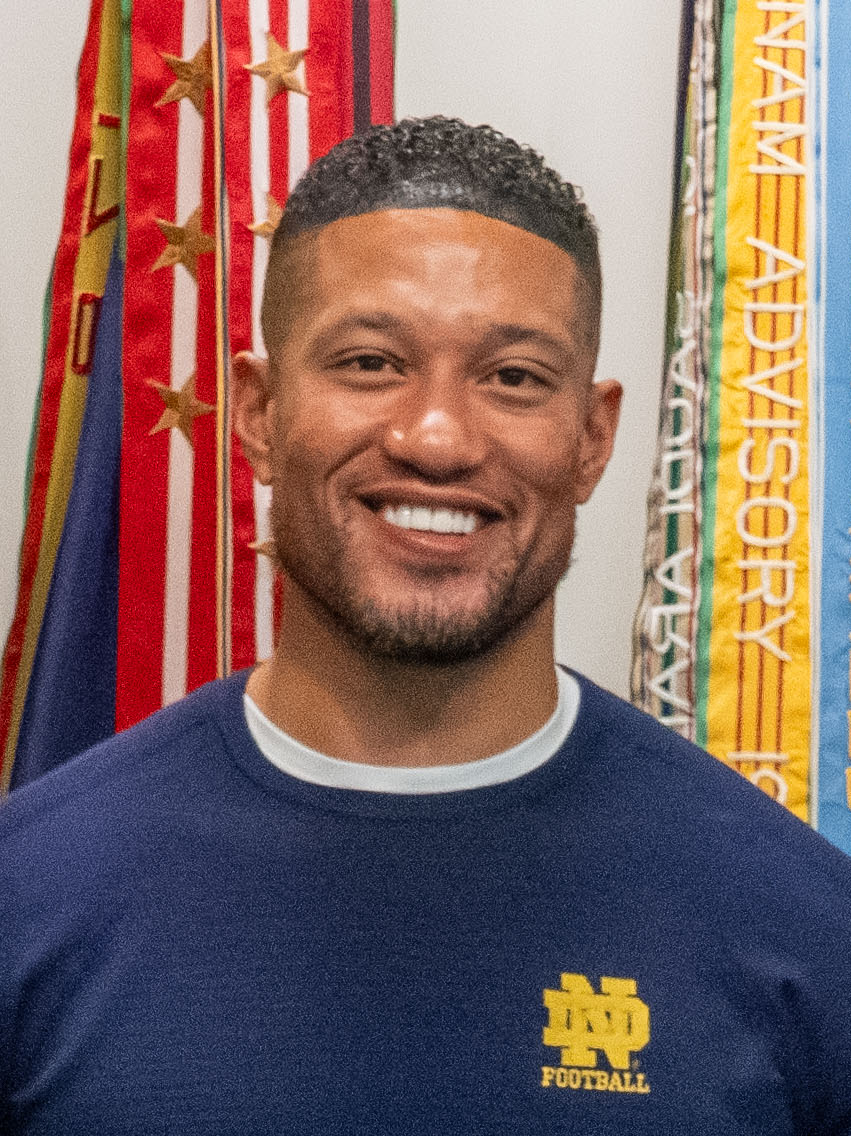
By winning the game, Notre Dame head coach Marcus Freeman (pictured) became the first Asian and first African-American to serve as a head coach during an FBS national championship game.

As a result of their win, the Notre Dame Fighting Irish qualified for the 2025 College Football Playoff National Championship. This was the first time that the Fighting Irish played for the national title since they lost against the Alabama Crimson Tide in the 2013 BCS National Championship Game (Notre Dame was later forced to vacate their appearance in the 2013 BCS title game due to an academic fraud scandal). By qualifying to play in the championship, coach Marcus Freeman became the first Asian and first Black head coach to ever lead a team in an NCAA Division I Football Bowl Subdivision national championship game. The Irish lost to Freeman's alma mater, Ohio State, in the National Championship Game 34–23.

Penn State ended their postseason with the loss, achieving a 13–3 record overall. Franklin, who had been derisively nicknamed "Big Game James" after posting a 1–14 record against AP top-5 teams coming into this game as Penn State's head coach, worsened his record against the AP top 5 in the role to 1–15. Penn State fired Franklin the next season after beginning the season with a 3–3 record, which included a loss to #6 Oregon. Franklin finished 1-16 against top 5 teams as Nittany Lions head coach.
