= 2025 Notre Dame Fighting Irish football team =

American college football season

2025 Notre Dame Fighting Irish football
- Conference: Independent

Ranking
- Coaches: No. 11
- AP: No. 10
- Record: 10–2
- Head coach: Marcus Freeman (4th season)
- Offensive coordinator: Mike Denbrock (2nd in current stint, 3rd overall season)
- Offensive scheme: Multiple
- Defensive coordinator: Chris Ash (1st season)
- Base defense: 4–2–5
- MVP: Jeremiyah Love
- Captains: Drayk Bowen; Donovan Hinish; Will Pauling; Billy Schrauth; Adon Shuler; Aamil Wagner
- Home stadium: Notre Dame Stadium

Uniform
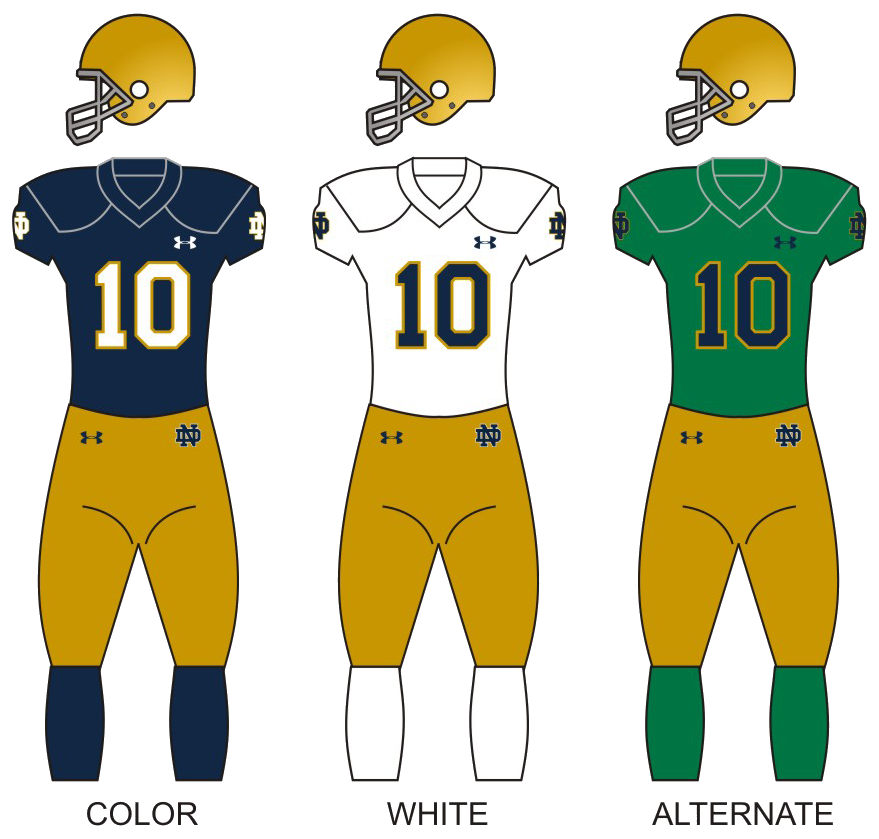

2025 NCAA Division I FBS independents football records
	Conf.			Overall
Team	W		L	W		L
No. 10 Notre Dame		–		10	–	2
UConn		–		9	–	4
Rankings from AP Poll

The 2025 Notre Dame Fighting Irish football team was an American football team that represented the University of Notre Dame as an independent during the 2025 NCAA Division I FBS football season. In their fourth year under head coach Marcus Freeman, the Irish compiled a 10–2 record, outscored opponents by a total of 504 to 211, and were ranked No. 10 in the final AP poll and No. 11 in the final Coaches Poll. They opened with losses to No. 10 Miami (FL) and No. 16 Texas A&M and then won ten consecutive games, including victories over No. 20 USC and No. 23 Pittsburgh. They did not receive an invitation to the 2025–26 College Football Playoff and withdrew from consideration for other bowl games.

Running back Jeremiyah Love rushed for 1,372 yards, scored 21 touchdowns, won the Doak Walker Award, finished third in the Heisman Trophy voting, and was a unanimous first-team pick on the 2025 All-America college football team. Cornerback Leonard Moore also won unanimous All-America honors. The team's other statistical leaders included quarterback CJ Carr (2,741 passing yards), wide receiver Jordan Faison (640 receiving yard), and linebacker Drayk Bowen (67 total tackles).

The team played its home games at Notre Dame Stadium in Notre Dame, Indiana. The Irish drew an average home attendance of 77,622.

== Offseason ==
=== Coaching changes ===
==== Departures ====
Name	Position	New team	New position
Al Golden	Defensive coordinator	Cincinnati Bengals	Defensive coordinator
Deland McCullough	Associate head coach/running backs coach	Las Vegas Raiders	Running backs coach

==== Additions ====
Name	Position	Previous team	Previous position
Chris Ash	Defensive coordinator	Jacksonville Jaguars	Scout
Ja'Juan Seider	Associate head coach/running backs coach	Penn State	Associate head coach/co-offensive coordinator/running backs coach

=== Player departures ===
==== NFL ====
Player	Position	Team	Round	Pick	Notes
Benjamin Morrison	CB	Tampa Bay Buccaneers	2	53	Forewent 1 year of remaining eligibility
Xavier Watts	S	Atlanta Falcons	3	96	Forewent 1 year of remaining eligibility
Jack Kiser	LB	Jacksonville Jaguars	4	107	
Rylie Mills	DL	Seattle Seahawks	5	142	
Mitchell Evans	TE	Carolina Panthers	5	163	
Riley Leonard	QB	Indianapolis Colts	6	189	
Jordan Clark	S	New York Jets	Undrafted free agent		
Beaux Collins	WR	New York Giants	Undrafted free agent		
Howard Cross III	DL	Cincinnati Bengals	Undrafted free agent		
Max Hurleman	CB	Pittsburgh Steelers	Undrafted free agent		
Devyn Ford	RB	Las Vegas Raiders	Rookie minicamp invite		
Mitch Jeter	K	Minnesota Vikings	Rookie minicamp invite		
Kris Mitchell	WR	Las Vegas Raiders	Rookie minicamp invite		
RJ Oben	DL	Kansas City Chiefs	Rookie minicamp invite		

==== CFL ====
- WR Jayden Harrison

==== Transfers out ====
- QB Steve Angeli transferred to Syracuse.
- OL Ty Chan transferred to UConn.
- WR Deion Colzie transferred to Miami (OH).
- OL Pat Coogan transferred to Indiana.
- DL Tyson Ford transferred to California; previously medically retired.
- DL Aiden Gobaira transferred to James Madison; previously medically retired.
- CB Jaden Mickey transferred to Boise State; previously committed to California.
- LS Rino Monteforte transferred to California; previously walk-on.
- OL Sam Pendleton transferred to Tennessee.
- OL Rocco Spindler transferred to Nebraska.
- WR Jayden Thomas transferred to Virginia.
- S Kennedy Urlacher transferred to USC.
- TE Andrew Yanoshak transferred to Dayton; previously walk-on.
- K Zac Yoakam transferred to Houston; previously walk-on.

==== Retirements ====
- CB Marty Auer
- DL Quentin Autry
- OL Tosh Baker
- P William Bartel
- TE Kevin Bauman
- P/K Eric Goins
- S Rod Heard II
- WR Jack Polian
- LB Tre Reader
- DL Grant Ristoff
- K Chris Salerno
- TE Charlie Selna
- TE Davis Sherwood

=== Player additions ===
==== Transfers in ====
- K Noah Burnette transferred in from North Carolina.
- DL Jared Dawson transferred in from Louisville.
- WR Malachi Fields transferred in from Virginia.
- DL Elijah Hughes transferred in from USC.
- WR Will Pauling transferred in from Wisconsin.
- CB DeVonta Smith transferred in from Alabama.
- S Jalen Stroman transferred in from Virginia Tech.
- TE Ty Washington transferred in from Arkansas.

==== Recruiting ====
College recruiting (2025)
Name	Hometown	School	Height	Weight	Commit date
Matty Augustine; OL	Greenwich, CT	Brunswick School	6 ft 7 in (2.01 m)	292 lb (132 kg)	
Matty Augustine; OL	Recruit ratings: Rivals: 247Sports: ESPN: (78)				
Jerome Bettis Jr. WR	Atlanta, GA	Woodward Academy	6 ft 2 in (1.88 m)	201 lb (91 kg)	
Jerome Bettis Jr. WR	Recruit ratings: Rivals: 247Sports: ESPN: (77)				
Will Black; OL	London, ON	Choate Rosemary Hall	6 ft 7 in (2.01 m)	292 lb (132 kg)	
Will Black; OL	Recruit ratings: Rivals: 247Sports: ESPN: (83)				
JaDon Blair; S	Winston-Salem, NC	Mount Tabor	6 ft 5 in (1.96 m)	195 lb (88 kg)	
JaDon Blair; S	Recruit ratings: Rivals: 247Sports: ESPN: (81)				
Christopher Burgess Jr. DL	Chicago, IL	Simeon Career Academy	6 ft 3 in (1.91 m)	245 lb (111 kg)	
Christopher Burgess Jr. DL	Recruit ratings: Rivals: 247Sports: ESPN: (81)				
Elijah Burress; WR	Totowa, NJ	DePaul Catholic	6 ft 0 in (1.83 m)	173 lb (78 kg)	
Elijah Burress; WR	Recruit ratings: Rivals: 247Sports: ESPN: (80)				
Davion Dixon; DL	Homestead, FL	Miami Palmetto	6 ft 2 in (1.88 m)	322 lb (146 kg)	
Davion Dixon; DL	Recruit ratings: Rivals: 247Sports: ESPN: (75)				
Madden Faraimo; LB	Oceanside, CA	JSerra Catholic	6 ft 2 in (1.88 m)	220 lb (100 kg)	
Madden Faraimo; LB	Recruit ratings: Rivals: 247Sports: ESPN: (83)				
James Flanigan; TE	Green Bay, WI	Notre Dame de la Baie Academy	6 ft 5 in (1.96 m)	230 lb (100 kg)	
James Flanigan; TE	Recruit ratings: Rivals: 247Sports: ESPN: (83)				
Dallas Golden; CB	Tampa, FL	Berkeley Prep	6 ft 0 in (1.83 m)	180 lb (82 kg)	
Dallas Golden; CB	Recruit ratings: Rivals: 247Sports: ESPN: (82)				
Blake Hebert; QB	Boxford, MA	Brunswick School	6 ft 3 in (1.91 m)	220 lb (100 kg)	
Blake Hebert; QB	Recruit ratings: Rivals: 247Sports: ESPN: (81)				
Cam Herron; OL	Indianapolis, IN	Warren Central	6 ft 2 in (1.88 m)	288 lb (131 kg)	
Cam Herron; OL	Recruit ratings: Rivals: 247Sports: ESPN: (80)				
Dominik Hulak; DL	Glendale Heights, IL	Immaculate Conception	6 ft 4 in (1.93 m)	240 lb (110 kg)	
Dominik Hulak; DL	Recruit ratings: Rivals: 247Sports: ESPN: (77)				
Nolan James Jr. RB	Westwood, NJ	DePaul Catholic	5 ft 10 in (1.78 m)	199 lb (90 kg)	
Nolan James Jr. RB	Recruit ratings: Rivals: 247Sports: ESPN: (79)				
Ko'o Kia; LB	Kahaluʻu, HI	Punahou	6 ft 1 in (1.85 m)	209 lb (95 kg)	
Ko'o Kia; LB	Recruit ratings: Rivals: 247Sports: ESPN: (78)				
Brandon Logan; S	Fort Wayne, IN	Snider	5 ft 11 in (1.80 m)	186 lb (84 kg)	
Brandon Logan; S	Recruit ratings: Rivals: 247Sports: ESPN: (77)				
Ethan Long; S	Milford, CT	Brunswick School	6 ft 2 in (1.88 m)	194 lb (88 kg)	
Ethan Long; S	Recruit ratings: Rivals: 247Sports: ESPN: (77)				
Joe Reiff; DL	Elmhurst, IL	York Community High School	6 ft 5 in (1.96 m)	255 lb (116 kg)	
Joe Reiff; DL	Recruit ratings: Rivals: 247Sports: ESPN: (78)				
Scrap Richardson; WR	Greenville, GA	Greenville	6 ft 0 in (1.83 m)	166 lb (75 kg)	
Scrap Richardson; WR	Recruit ratings: Rivals: 247Sports: ESPN: (80)				
Anthony Sacca; LB	Delran Township, NJ	St. Joseph's Prep School	6 ft 3 in (1.91 m)	225 lb (102 kg)	
Anthony Sacca; LB	Recruit ratings: Rivals: 247Sports: ESPN: (82)				
Erik Schmidt; K	Milwaukee, WI	Marquette University High School	6 ft 1 in (1.85 m)	210 lb (95 kg)	
Erik Schmidt; K	Recruit ratings: Rivals: 247Sports: ESPN: (76)				
Owen Strebig; OL	Brookfield, WI	Waukesha Catholic Memorial	6 ft 8 in (2.03 m)	298 lb (135 kg)	
Owen Strebig; OL	Recruit ratings: Rivals: 247Sports: ESPN: (82)				
Gordy Sulfsted; DL	Cincinnati, OH	St. Xavier	6 ft 4 in (1.93 m)	245 lb (111 kg)	
Gordy Sulfsted; DL	Recruit ratings: Rivals: 247Sports: ESPN: (78)				
Cree Thomas; CB	Phoenix, AZ	Brophy College Preparatory	6 ft 1 in (1.85 m)	176 lb (80 kg)	
Cree Thomas; CB	Recruit ratings: Rivals: 247Sports: ESPN: (78)				
Mark Zackery IV; CB	Indianapolis, IN	Ben Davis	6 ft 0 in (1.83 m)	170 lb (77 kg)	
Mark Zackery IV; CB	Recruit ratings: Rivals: 247Sports: ESPN: (81)				
Overall recruit ranking: Rivals: 11 247Sports: 12
Note: In many cases, Scout, Rivals, 247Sports, On3, and ESPN may conflict in their listings of height and weight.; In these cases, the average was taken. ESPN grades are on a 100-point scale.; Sources: "Rivals commits". Rivals.; "ESPN commits". ESPN.; "2025 Team Ranking". Rivals.com.; "247Sports commits". 247Sports.

=== Changes ===
- Tyler Buchner switched positions from WR to QB.
- Justin Fisher switched positions from RB to TE.
- Devan Houstan switched positions from DL to OL.
- WR Matt Jeffery earned scholarship; previously walk-on.
- LS Joseph Vinci earned scholarship; previously walk-on.
- Preston Zinter switched positions from LB to DL.

== Schedule ==
Date	Time	Opponent	Rank	Site	TV	Result	Attendance
August 31	7:30 p.m.	at No. 10 Miami (FL)	No. 6	Hard Rock Stadium; Miami Gardens, FL (rivalry)	ABC	L 24–27	66,793
September 13	7:30 p.m.	No. 16 Texas A&M	No. 8	Notre Dame Stadium; Notre Dame, IN	NBC	L 40–41	77,622
September 20	3:30 p.m.	Purdue	No. 24	Notre Dame Stadium; Notre Dame, IN (Shillelagh Trophy)	NBC/Peacock (Note: Game was moved to Peacock due to overrun into Big Ten Saturday Night after it was delayed due to lightning in the area.)	W 56–30	77,622
September 27	12:00 p.m.	at Arkansas	No. 22	Donald W. Reynolds Razorback Stadium; Fayetteville, AR	ABC	W 56–13	75,111
October 4	3:30 p.m.	Boise State	No. 21	Notre Dame Stadium; Notre Dame, IN	NBC	W 28–7	77,622
October 11	3:30 p.m.	NC State	No. 16	Notre Dame Stadium; Notre Dame, IN	Peacock/NBC (Note: Game also aired on NBC at the end of the USC at UCLA women's volleyball game.)	W 36–7	77,622
October 18	7:30 p.m.	No. 20 USC^{†}	No. 13	Notre Dame Stadium; Notre Dame, IN (Jewelled Shillelagh)	NBC	W 34–24	77,622
November 1	3:30 p.m.	at Boston College	No. 12	Alumni Stadium; Chestnut Hill, MA (Holy War)	ESPN	W 25–10	44,500
November 8	7:30 p.m.	Navy	No. 10	Notre Dame Stadium; Notre Dame, IN (rivalry)	NBC	W 49–10	77,622
November 15	12:00 p.m.	at No. 22 Pittsburgh	No. 9	Acrisure Stadium; Pittsburgh, PA (rivalry, College GameDay)	ABC	W 37–15	68,400
November 22	3:30 p.m.	Syracuse	No. 9	Notre Dame Stadium; Notre Dame, IN	NBC	W 70–7	77,622
November 29	10:30 p.m.	at Stanford	No. 9	Stanford Stadium; Stanford, CA (Legends Trophy)	ESPN	W 49–20	27,456
^{†}Homecoming; Rankings from AP Poll (and CFP Rankings, after November 4) - Released prior to game; All times are in Eastern time; Source:

== Rankings ==
Ranking movements Legend: ██ Increase in ranking ██ Decrease in ranking
	Week																
Poll	Pre	1	2	3	4	5	6	7	8	9	10	11	12	13	14	15	Final
AP	6	9	8	24	22	21	16	13	12	12	10	9	9	9	9	9	10
Coaches	5	9	8	21	21	21	16	15	13	12	10	9	9	9	9	9	11
CFP	Not released										10	9	9	9	10	11	Not released

== Game summaries ==
=== at No. 10 Miami (FL) (rivalry) ===
No. 6 Notre Dame Fighting Irish (0–0) at No. 10 Miami Hurricanes (0–0) – Game summary

Quarter	1	2	3	4	Total
No. 6 Fighting Irish	0	7	0	17	24
No. 10 Hurricanes	0	14	7	6	27

at Hard Rock Stadium • Miami Gardens, Florida

- Date: August 31
- Game time: 7:30 p.m.
- Game weather: Rain, 77 °F (25 °C), Wind N @ 4 mph (6 km/h)
- Game attendance: 66,793
- Referee: Adam Savoie
- TV announcers (ABC): Sean McDonough (play-by-play), Greg McElroy (analyst), Molly McGrath and Taylor McGregor (sideline reporters)
- Box score, Recap

Game information

First quarter

- No scoring plays.

Second quarter

- (14:03) MIA – Malachi Toney 28-yard pass from Carson Beck, Carter Davis kick (Drive: 8 plays, 70 yards, 2:42; Miami 7–0)
- (5:21) ND – Micah Gilbert 7-yard pass from CJ Carr, Noah Burnette kick (Drive: 11 plays, 68 yards, 5:49; Tied 7–7)
- (0:12) MIA – CJ Daniels 20-yard pass from Carson Beck, Carter Davis kick (Drive: 10 plays, 75 yards, 5:09; Miami 14–7)

Third quarter

- (7:23) MIA – CharMar Brown 5-yard run, Carter Davis kick (Drive: 12 plays, 75 yards, 7:37; Miami 21–7)

Fourth quarter

- (14:55) ND – Jordan Faison 1-yard pass from CJ Carr, Noah Burnette kick (Drive: 11 plays, 64 yards, 5:16; Miami 21–14)
- (9:42) MIA – Carter Davis 38-yard field goal (Drive: 4 plays, 8 yards, 2:13; Miami 24–14)
- (5:32) ND – Noah Burnette 39-yard field goal (Drive: 10 plays, 54 yards, 4:10; Miami 24–17)
- (3:21) ND – CJ Carr 7-yard run, Noah Burnette kick (Drive: 3 plays, 75 yards, 1:14; Tied 24–24)
- (1:04) MIA – Carter Davis 47-yard field goal (Drive: 9 plays, 46 yards, 2:17; Miami 27–24)

Statistics	ND	MIA
First downs	18	20
Plays–yards	54–315	68–332
Rushes–yards	24–97	37–127
Passing yards	221	205
Passing: comp–att–int	19–30–1	20–31–0
Turnovers	2	0
Time of possession	26:03	33:57

Team	Category	Player	Statistics
Notre Dame	Passing	CJ Carr	19/30, 221 yards, 2 TD, INT
Notre Dame	Rushing	Jadarian Price	6 carries, 45 yards
Notre Dame	Receiving	Eli Raridon	5 receptions, 97 yards
Miami (FL)	Passing	Carson Beck	20/30, 205 yards, 2 TD
Miami (FL)	Rushing	CharMar Brown	15 carries, 69 yards, TD
Miami (FL)	Receiving	Malachi Toney	6 receptions, 82 yards, TD

=== vs No. 16 Texas A&M ===
No. 16 Texas A&M Aggies (2–0) at No. 8 Notre Dame Fighting Irish (0–1) – Game summary

Quarter	1	2	3	4	Total
No. 16 Aggies	7	21	3	10	41
No. 8 Fighting Irish	14	10	7	9	40

at Notre Dame Stadium • Notre Dame, Indiana

- Date: September 13
- Game time: 7:30 p.m.
- Game weather: Cloudy, 72 °F (22 °C), Wind SE @ 6 mph (10 km/h)
- Game attendance: 77,622
- Referee: Kyle Olson
- TV announcers (NBC): Noah Eagle (play-by-play), Todd Blackledge (analyst), and Kathryn Tappen (sideline reporter)
- Box score, Recap

Game information

First quarter

- (13:06) ND – Tae Johnson 20-yard blocked punt return, Noah Burnette kick (Drive: 1:54; Notre Dame 7–0)
- (9:33) TA&M – Mario Craver 86-yard pass from Marcel Reed, Randy Bond kick (Drive: 2 plays, 90 yards, 0:47; Tied 7–7)
- (6:30) ND – Jadarian Price 7-yard run, Noah Burnette kick (Drive: 7 plays, 75 yards, 3:03; Notre Dame 14–7)

Second quarter

- (14:54) ND – Noah Burnette 22-yard field goal (Drive: 11 plays, 38 yards, 5:55; Notre Dame 17–7)
- (12:23) TA&M – Le'Veon Moss 1-yard run, Randy Bond kick (Drive: 5 plays, 75 yards, 2:31; Notre Dame 17–14)
- (9:43) ND – Jeremiyah Love 36-yard pass from CJ Carr, Noah Burnette kick (Drive: 6 plays, 75 yards, 2:40; Notre Dame 24–14)
- (5:32) TA&M – Le'Veon Moss 2-yard run, Randy Bond kick (Drive: 9 plays, 75 yards, 4:11; Notre Dame 24–21)
- (1:11) TA&M – Le'Veon Moss 1-yard run, Randy Bond kick (Drive: 7 plays, 47 yards, 2:20; Texas A&M 28–24)

Third quarter

- (8:17) ND – Jadarian Price 17-yard run, Noah Burnette kick (Drive: 5 plays, 29 yards, 2:15; Notre Dame 31–28)
- (0:44) TA&M – Randy Bond 43-yard field goal (Drive: 6 plays, 25 yards, 2:50; Tied 31–31)

Fourth quarter

- (14:01) ND – Noah Burnette 39-yard field goal (Drive: 6 plays, 44 yards, 1:36; Notre Dame 34–31)
- (9:06) TA&M – Randy Bond 45-yard field goal (Drive: 11 plays, 47 yards, 4:55; Tied 34–34)
- (2:53) ND – Jeremiyah Love 12-yard run, Preston Zinter pass from Tyler Buchner failed (Drive: 12 plays, 75 yards, 6:13; Notre Dame 40–34)
- (0:13) TA&M – Nate Boerkircher 11-yard pass from Marcel Reed, Randy Bond kick (Drive: 13 plays, 74 yards, 2:28; Texas A&M 41–40)

Statistics	TA&M	ND
First downs	24	23
Plays–yards	69–488	71–429
Rushes–yards	32–128	39–136
Passing yards	360	293
Passing: comp–att–int	17–37–1	20–32–1
Turnovers	1	1
Time of possession	26:53	33:07

Team	Category	Player	Statistics
Texas A&M	Passing	Marcel Reed	17/37, 360 yards, 2 TD, INT
Texas A&M	Rushing	Le'Veon Moss	20 carries, 81 yards, 3 TD
Texas A&M	Receiving	Mario Craver	7 receptions, 207 yards, TD
Notre Dame	Passing	CJ Carr	20/32, 293 yards, TD, INT
Notre Dame	Rushing	Jeremiyah Love	23 carries, 94 yards, TD
Notre Dame	Receiving	Eli Raridon	4 receptions, 85 yards

=== vs Purdue (rivalry) ===
Purdue Boilermakers (2–1) at No. 24 Notre Dame Fighting Irish (0–2) – Game summary

Quarter	1	2	3	4	Total
Boilermakers	7	16	0	7	30
No. 24 Fighting Irish	14	21	21	0	56

at Notre Dame Stadium • Notre Dame, Indiana

- Date: September 20
- Game time: 3:30 p.m.
- Game weather: Cloudy, 83 °F (28 °C), Wind S @ 6 mph (10 km/h)
- Game attendance: 77,622
- Referee: Mark Kluczynski
- TV announcers (NBC/Peacock): Dan Hicks (play-by-play), Jason Garrett (analyst), and Zora Stephenson (sideline reporter)
- Box score, Recap

Game information

First quarter

- (13:40) ND – Malachi Fields 66-yard pass from CJ Carr, Erik Schmidt kick (Drive: 1 play, 66 yards, 0:09; Notre Dame 7–0)
- (10:58) PUR – Ryan Browne 14-yard pass from Devin Mockobee, Spencer Porath kick (Drive: 6 plays, 75 yards, 2:42; Tied 7–7)
- (5:54) ND – Jeremiyah Love 1-yard run, Erik Schmidt kick (Drive: 10 plays, 56 yards, 4:57; Notre Dame 14–7)

Second quarter

- (14:50) PUR – Spencer Porath 48-yard field goal (Drive: 13 plays, 45 yards, 6:04; Notre Dame 14–10)
- (10:00) ND – Jadarian Price 21-yard run, Erik Schmidt kick (Drive: 9 plays, 75 yards, 4:50; Notre Dame 21–10)
- (6:33) ND – Jadarian Price 9-yard run, Erik Schmidt kick (Drive: 5 plays, 36 yards, 2:16; Notre Dame 28–10)
- (1:46) PUR – Spencer Porath 26-yard field goal (Drive: 12 plays, 67 yards, 4:47; Notre Dame 28–13)
- (1:13) PUR – Spencer Porath 35-yard field goal (Drive: 4 plays, 1 yard, 0:27; Notre Dame 28–16)
- (1:00) ND – Jadarian Price 100-yard kickoff return, Erik Schmidt kick (Drive: 0:00; Notre Dame 35–16)
- (0:07) PUR – Nitro Tuggle 24-yard pass from Ryan Browne, Spencer Porath kick (Drive: 6 plays, 75 yards, 0:53; Notre Dame 35–23)

Third quarter

- (12:54) ND – Jeremiyah Love 46-yard run, Erik Schmidt kick (Drive: 5 plays, 75 yards, 2:06; Notre Dame 42–23)
- (9:52) ND – Jordan Faison 48-yard pass from CJ Carr, Erik Schmidt kick (Drive: 3 plays, 67 yards, 1:11; Notre Dame 49–23)
- (3:46) ND – Jadarian Price 1-yard run, Erik Schmidt kick (Drive: 8 plays, 70 yards, 5:01; Notre Dame 56–23)

Fourth quarter

- (1:53) PUR – Jesse Watson 24-yard pass from Malachi Singleton, Spencer Porath kick (Drive: 5 plays, 58 yards, 2:05; Notre Dame 56–30)

Statistics	PUR	ND
First downs	20	27
Plays–yards	68–369	63–535
Rushes–yards	28–66	43–254
Passing yards	303	281
Passing: comp–att–int	25–40–2	17–20–0
Turnovers	2	1
Time of possession	28:00	32:00

Team	Category	Player	Statistics
Purdue	Passing	Ryan Browne	21/34, 250 yards, TD, INT
Purdue	Rushing	Malachi Singleton	5 carries, 26 yards
Purdue	Receiving	Nitro Tuggle	3 receptions, 66 yards, TD
Notre Dame	Passing	CJ Carr	10/12, 223 yards, 2 TD
Notre Dame	Rushing	Jeremiyah Love	19 carries, 157 yards, 2 TD
Notre Dame	Receiving	Jordan Faison	5 receptions, 105 yards, TD

=== at Arkansas ===
No. 22 Notre Dame Fighting Irish (1–2) at Arkansas Razorbacks (2–2) – Game summary

Quarter	1	2	3	4	Total
No. 22 Fighting Irish	14	28	7	7	56
Razorbacks	3	10	0	0	13

at Donald W. Reynolds Razorback Stadium • Fayetteville, Arkansas

- Date: September 27
- Game time: 12:00 p.m.
- Game weather: Sunny, 75 °F (24 °C), Wind SW @ 3 mph (5 km/h)
- Game attendance: 75,111
- Referee: Lee Hedrick
- TV announcers (ABC): Dave Pasch (play-by-play), Dusty Dvoracek (analyst), and Taylor McGregor (sideline reporter)
- Box score, Recap

Game information

First quarter

- (12:55) ARK – Scott Starzyk 39-yard field goal (Drive: 7 plays, 54 yards, 2:05, Arkansas 3–0)
- (8:16) ND – Jeremiyah Love 1-yard run, Noah Burnette kick (Drive: 10 plays, 75 yards, 4:39, Notre Dame 7–3)
- (4:14) ND – Jeremiyah Love 7-yard pass from CJ Carr, Noah Burnette kick (Drive: 6 plays, 73 yards, 3:14, Notre Dame 14–3)

Second quarter

- (11:19) ARK – Shaq McRoy 1-yard run, Scott Starzyk kick (Drive: 14 plays, 75 yards, 7:55, Notre Dame 14–10)
- (8:26) ND – Will Pauling 23-yard pass from CJ Carr, Noah Burnette kick (Drive: 6 plays, 75 yards, 2:53, Notre Dame 21–10)
- (6:04) ND – Jeremiyah Love 34-yard pass from CJ Carr, Noah Burnette kick (Drive: 5 plays, 70 yards, 1:25, Notre Dame 28–10)
- (3:48) ARK – Scott Starzyk 49-yard field goal (Drive: 6 plays, 44 yards, 2:16, Notre Dame 28–13)
- (0:35) ND – Jeremiyah Love 3-yard run, Noah Burnette kick (Drive: 12 plays, 75 yards, 3:13, Notre Dame 35–13)
- (0:09) ND – Jadarian Price 35-yard pass from CJ Carr, Noah Burnette kick (Drive: 2 plays, 45 yards, 0:15, Notre Dame 42–13)

Third quarter

- (1:01) ND – Jadarian Price 16-yard run, Noah Burnette kick (Drive: 11 plays, 87 yards, 5:37, Notre Dame 49–13)

Fourth quarter

- (8:54) ND – Aneyas Williams 17-yard run, Erik Schmidt kick (Drive: 4 plays, 57 yards, 2:07, Notre Dame 56–13)

Statistics	ND	ARK
First downs	32	15
Plays–yards	72–641	62–365
Rushes–yards	40–210	30–158
Passing yards	431	207
Passing: comp–att–int	24–32–0	17–32–1
Turnovers	0	2
Time of possession	32:47	27:13

Team	Category	Player	Statistics
Notre Dame	Passing	CJ Carr	22/30, 354 yards, 4 TD
Notre Dame	Rushing	Jadarian Price	13 carries, 86 yards, TD
Notre Dame	Receiving	Jordan Faison	7 receptions, 89 yards
Arkansas	Passing	Taylen Green	17/32, 207 yards, INT
Arkansas	Rushing	Taylen Green	10 carries, 81 yards
Arkansas	Receiving	O'Mega Blake	6 receptions, 73 yards

=== vs Boise State ===
Boise State Broncos (3–1) at No. 21 Notre Dame Fighting Irish (2–2) – Game summary

Quarter	1	2	3	4	Total
Broncos	0	7	0	0	7
No. 21 Fighting Irish	6	8	7	7	28

at Notre Dame Stadium • Notre Dame, Indiana

- Date: October 4
- Game time: 3:30 p.m.
- Game weather: Sunny, 84 °F (29 °C)
- Game attendance: 77,622
- Referee: Justin Elliott
- TV announcers (NBC): Dan Hicks (play-by-play), Jason Garrett (analyst), and Zora Stephenson (sideline reporter)
- Box score, Recap

Game information

First quarter

- (4:47) ND – Will Pauling 19-yard pass from CJ Carr, Erik Schmidt kick blocked (Drive: 6 plays, 69 yards, 2:25, Notre Dame 6–0)

Second quarter

- (4:03) BOIS – Maddux Madsen 1-yard run, Colton Boomer kick (Drive: 10 plays, 72 yards, 5:24, Boise State 7–6)
- (0:48) ND – Jeremiyah Love 4-yard run, Will Pauling pass from CJ Carr (Drive: 9 plays, 75 yards, 3:15, Notre Dame 14–7)

Third quarter

- (5:49) ND – Malachi Fields 6-yard pass from CJ Carr, Marcello Diomede kick (Drive: 10 plays, 79 yards, 4:31, Notre Dame 21–7)

Fourth quarter

- (7:54) ND – Jadarian Price 49-yard run, Marcello Diomede kick (Drive: 2 plays, 52 yards, 0:43, Notre Dame 28–7)

Statistics	BOIS	ND
First downs	23	19
Plays–yards	71–315	54–389
Rushes–yards	34–100	31–200
Passing yards	215	189
Passing: Comp–Att–Int	22–37–4	15–23–0
Turnovers	4	0
Time of possession	35:46	24:14

Team	Category	Player	Statistics
Boise State	Passing	Maddux Madsen	22/37, 215 yards, 4 INT
Boise State	Rushing	Sire Gaines	11 carries, 39 yards
Boise State	Receiving	Chris Marshall	4 receptions, 58 yards
Notre Dame	Passing	CJ Carr	15/23, 189 yards, 2 TD
Notre Dame	Rushing	Jeremiyah Love	16 carries, 103 yards, TD
Notre Dame	Receiving	Jordan Faison	6 receptions, 83 yards

=== vs NC State ===
NC State Wolfpack (4–2) at No. 16 Notre Dame Fighting Irish (3–2) – Game summary

Quarter	1	2	3	4	Total
Wolfpack	0	7	0	0	7
No. 16 Fighting Irish	7	3	14	12	36

at Notre Dame Stadium • Notre Dame, Indiana

- Date: October 11
- Game time: 3:30 p.m.
- Game weather: Sunny, 67 °F (19 °C)
- Game attendance: 77,622
- Referee: Tim Hedgepeth
- TV announcers (Peacock/NBC): Dan Hicks (play-by-play), Jason Garrett (analyst), and Zora Stephenson (sideline reporter)
- Box score, Recap

Game information

First quarter

- (9:49) ND – Jeremiyah Love 2-yard run, Noah Burnette kick (Drive: 6 plays, 58 yards, 3:04, Notre Dame 7–0)

Second quarter

- (13:48) NCSU – Terrell Anderson 45-yard pass from CJ Bailey, Kanoah Vinesett kick (Drive: 11 plays, 83 yards, 4:27, Tied 7–7)
- (0:00) ND – Noah Burnette 48-yard field goal (Drive: 5 plays, 40 yards, 0:23, Notre Dame 10–7)

Third quarter

- (6:58) ND – KK Smith 18-yard pass from CJ Carr, Noah Burnette kick (Drive: 11 plays, 90 yards, 5:56, Notre Dame 17–7)
- (2:46) ND – Will Pauling 12-yard pass from CJ Carr, Noah Burnette kick (Drive: 5 plays, 80 yards, 1:28, Notre Dame 24–7)

Fourth quarter

- (12:48) ND – Noah Burnette 34-yard field goal (Drive: 4 plays, 1 yard, 1:16, Notre Dame 27–7)
- (9:17) ND – Team safety (Drive: 1 play, -2 yards, 0:20, Notre Dame 29–7)
- (5:13) ND – Jeremiyah Love 1-yard run, Erik Schmidt kick (Drive: 10 plays, 82 yards, 3:41, Notre Dame 36–7)

Statistics	NCSU	ND
First downs	12	24
Plays–yards	59–233	71–485
Rushes–yards	28–51	39–143
Passing yards	182	342
Passing: comp–att–int	18–31–3	19–32–1
Turnovers	3	1
Time of possession	28:47	31:13

Team	Category	Player	Statistics
NC State	Passing	CJ Bailey	17/30, 186 yards, TD, 3 INT
NC State	Rushing	Hollywood Smothers	12 carries, 46 yards
NC State	Receiving	Terrell Anderson	3 receptions, 57 yards, TD
Notre Dame	Passing	CJ Carr	19/31, 342 yards, 2 TD, INT
Notre Dame	Rushing	Jeremiyah Love	18 carries, 86 yards, 2 TD
Notre Dame	Receiving	Eli Raridon	7 receptions, 109 yards

=== vs No. 20 USC (rivalry) ===
No. 20 USC Trojans (5–1) at No. 13 Notre Dame Fighting Irish (4–2) – Game summary

Quarter	1	2	3	4	Total
No. 20 Trojans	10	3	11	0	24
No. 13 Fighting Irish	7	7	13	7	34

at Notre Dame Stadium • Notre Dame, Indiana

- Date: October 18
- Game time: 7:30 p.m.
- Game weather: Cloudy, 67 °F (19 °C)
- Game attendance: 77,622
- Referee: Jerry Magallanes
- TV announcers (NBC): Noah Eagle (play-by-play), Todd Blackledge (analyst), and Kathryn Tappen (sideline reporter)
- Box score, Recap

Game information

First quarter

- (11:09) USC – Lake McRee 10-yard pass from Jayden Maiava, Ryon Sayeri kick (Drive: 10 plays, 75 yards, 3:51, USC 7–0)
- (10:11) ND – Jeremiyah Love 12-yard run, Noah Burnette kick (Drive: 4 plays, 75 yards, 0:58, Tied 7–7)
- (8:04) USC – Ryon Sayeri 42-yard field goal (Drive: 7 plays, 50 yards, 2:07, USC 10–7)

Second quarter

- (14:36) ND – Jadarian Price 16-yard run, Noah Burnette kick (Drive: 4 plays, 63 yards, 1:36, Notre Dame 14–10)
- (1:42) USC – Ryon Sayeri 24-yard field goal (Drive: 9 plays, 71 yards, 4:09, Notre Dame 14–13)

Third quarter

- (8:04) ND – Will Pauling 6-yard pass from CJ Carr, Noah Burnette kick (Drive: 13 plays, 75 yards, 6:56, Notre Dame 21–13)
- (6:19) USC – Ryon Sayeri 43-yard field goal (Drive: 5 plays, 39 yards, 1:45, Notre Dame 21–16)
- (4:32) USC – Ja'Kobi Lane 59-yard pass from Jayden Maiava, Ja'Kobi Lane pass from Jayden Maiava (Drive: 3 plays, 71 yards, 0:53, USC 24–21)
- (4:17) ND – Jadarian Price 100-yard kickoff return, Noah Burnette kick missed (Notre Dame 27–24)

Fourth quarter

- (7:16) ND – CJ Carr 1-yard run, Noah Burnette kick (Drive: 7 plays, 50 yards, 3:55, Notre Dame 34–24)

Statistics	USC	ND
First downs	24	23
Plays–yards	71–396	70–442
Rushes–yards	29–68	44–306
Passing yards	328	136
Passing: comp–att–int	22–42–2	16–26–1
Turnovers	3	1
Time of possession	27:21	32:39

Team	Category	Player	Statistics
USC	Passing	Jayden Maiava	22/42, 328 yards, 2 TD, 2 INT
USC	Rushing	King Miller	18 carries, 70 yards
USC	Receiving	Ja'Kobi Lane	6 receptions, 111 yards, TD
Notre Dame	Passing	CJ Carr	16/26, 136 yards, TD, INT
Notre Dame	Rushing	Jeremiyah Love	24 carries, 228 yards, TD
Notre Dame	Receiving	Jordan Faison	6 receptions, 60 yards

=== at Boston College (Holy War) ===
No. 12 Notre Dame Fighting Irish (5–2) at Boston College Eagles (1–7) – Game summary

Quarter	1	2	3	4	Total
No. 12 Fighting Irish	0	12	6	7	25
Eagles	0	7	3	0	10

at Alumni Stadium • Chestnut Hill, Massachusetts

- Date: November 1
- Game time: 3:30 p.m.
- Game weather: Sunny, 53 °F (12 °C), Wind W @ 16 mph (26 km/h)
- Game attendance: 44,500
- Referee: Jon Noli
- TV announcers (ESPN): Roy Philpott (play-by-play), Brock Osweiler (analyst), and Stormy Buonantony (sideline)
- Box score, Recap

Game information

First quarter

- No scoring plays.

Second quarter

- (14:52) ND – Malachi Fields 40-yard pass from CJ Carr, Noah Burnette kick missed (Drive: 10 plays, 85 yards, 5:20, Notre Dame 6–0)
- (1:53) ND – Will Pauling 44-yard pass from CJ Carr, Jeremiyah Love pass from CJ Carr failed (Drive: 4 plays, 73 yards, 1:30, Notre Dame 12–0)
- (0:22) BC – Reed Harris 25-yard pass from Grayson James, Luca Lombardo kick (Drive: 7 plays, 75 yards, 1:31, Notre Dame 12–7)

Third quarter

- (3:36) BC – Luca Lombardo 25-yard field goal (Drive: 21 plays, 74 yards, 11:20, Notre Dame 12–10)
- (0:32) ND – Jeremiyah Love 3-yard run, Marcello Diomede kick missed (Drive: 7 plays, 75 yards, 3:04, Notre Dame 18–10)

Fourth quarter

- (11:07) ND – Jeremiyah Love 94-yard run, Erik Schmidt kick (Drive: 1 play, 94 yards, 0:14, Notre Dame 25–10)

Statistics	ND	BC
First downs	22	21
Total yards	458	281
Rushes/yards	29–159	33–12
Passing yards	299	269
Passing: Comp–Att–Int	18–26–0	30–45–3
Turnovers	1	3
Time of possession	24:33	35:27

Team	Category	Player	Statistics
Notre Dame	Passing	CJ Carr	18/25, 299 yards, 2 TD
Notre Dame	Rushing	Jeremiyah Love	17 carries, 136 yards, 2 TD
Notre Dame	Receiving	Jordan Faison	4 receptions, 82 yards
Boston College	Passing	Grayson James	25/37, 240 yards, TD, 2 INT
Boston College	Rushing	Turbo Richard	16 carries, 26 yards
Boston College	Receiving	Lewis Bond	8 receptions, 92 yards

=== vs Navy (rivalry) ===
Navy Midshipmen (7–1) at No. 10 Notre Dame Fighting Irish (6–2) – Game summary

Quarter	1	2	3	4	Total
Midshipmen	0	10	0	0	10
No. 10 Fighting Irish	7	14	21	7	49

at Notre Dame Stadium • Notre Dame, Indiana

- Date: November 8
- Game time: 7:30 p.m.
- Game weather: Rain, 41 °F (5 °C), Wind E @ 5 mph (8 km/h)
- Game attendance: 77,622
- Referee: Kevin Randall
- TV announcers (NBC): Noah Eagle (play-by-play), Todd Blackledge (analyst), and Kathryn Tappen (sideline reporter)
- Box score, Recap

Game information

First quarter

- (7:31) ND – Jeremiyah Love 1-yard run, Erik Schmidt kick (Drive: 7 plays, 94 yards, 4:06, Notre Dame 7–0)

Second quarter

- (11:02) NAVY – Braxton Woodson 2-yard run, Nathan Kirkwood kick (Drive: 8 plays, 53 yards, 4:19, Tied 7–7)
- (5:57) ND – Jadarian Price 2-yard run, Erik Schmidt kick (Drive: 9 plays, 71 yards, 5:02, Notre Dame 14–7)
- (1:42) ND – Jordan Faison 5-yard pass from CJ Carr, Erik Schmidt kick (Drive: 7 plays, 68 yards, 2:43, Notre Dame 21–7)
- (0:15) NAVY – Nathan Kirkwood 33-yard field goal (Drive: 9 plays, 59 yards, 1:27, Notre Dame 21–10)

Third quarter

- (13:27) ND – Jeremiyah Love 48-yard run, Erik Schmidt kick (Drive: 4 plays, 65 yards, 1:33, Notre Dame 28–10)
- (11:27) ND – KK Smith 34-yard pass from CJ Carr, Erik Schmidt kick (Drive: 1 play, 34 yards, 0:07, Notre Dame 35–10)
- (6:27) ND – Ty Washington 4-yard pass from CJ Carr, Erik Schmidt kick (Drive: 6 plays, 49 yards, 3:21, Notre Dame 42–10)

Fourth quarter

- (11:27) ND – Aneyas Williams 54-yard run, Erik Schmidt kick (Drive: 9 plays, 93 yards, 5:13, Notre Dame 49–10)

Statistics	NAVY	ND
First downs	13	23
Plays–yards	55–228	57–502
Rushes–yards	45–206	38–249
Passing yards	22	253
Passing: Comp–Att–Int	3–10–0	16–19–0
Turnovers	0	0
Time of possession	29:23	30:37

Team	Category	Player	Statistics
Navy	Passing	Braxton Woodson	3/8, 22 yards
Navy	Rushing	Braxton Woodson	23 carries, 101 yards, TD
Navy	Receiving	Eli Heidenreich	2 receptions, 20 yards
Notre Dame	Passing	CJ Carr	13/16, 218 yards, 3 TD
Notre Dame	Rushing	Jeremiyah Love	13 carries, 94 yards, 2 TD
Notre Dame	Receiving	Malachi Fields	4 receptions, 97 yards

=== at No. 22 Pittsburgh (rivalry) ===
No. 9 Notre Dame Fighting Irish (7–2) at No. 22 Pittsburgh Panthers (7–2) – Game summary

Quarter	1	2	3	4	Total
No. 9 Fighting Irish	14	7	9	7	37
No. 22 Panthers	0	3	6	6	15

at Acrisure Stadium • Pittsburgh, Pennsylvania

- Date: November 15
- Game time: 12:00 p.m.
- Game weather: Cloudy, 60 °F (16 °C), Wind SW @ 11 mph (18 km/h)
- Game attendance: 68,400
- Referee: Tim Hedgepeth
- TV announcers (ABC): Joe Tessitore (play-by-play), Jesse Palmer (analyst), and Katie George (sideline reporter)
- Box score, Recap

Game information

First quarter

- (8:16) ND – Jeremiyah Love 56-yard run, Erik Schmidt kick (Drive: 1 play, 56 yards, 0:10, Notre Dame 7–0)
- (7:59) ND – Tae Johnson 49-yard interception return, Erik Schmidt kick (Drive: 0:10, Notre Dame 14–0)

Second quarter

- (13:55) PITT – Sam Carpenter 24-yard field goal (Drive: 4 plays, 6 yards, 0:47, Notre Dame 14–3)
- (1:56) ND – Malachi Fields 25-yard pass from CJ Carr, Erik Schmidt kick (Drive: 6 plays, 52 yards, 2:40, Notre Dame 21–3)

Third quarter

- (10:43) ND – Malachi Fields 6-yard pass from CJ Carr, Erik Schmidt kick (Drive: 9 plays, 54 yards, 4:07, Notre Dame 28–3)
- (1:39) PITT – Rasheem Biles 10-yard interception return, Tony Kinsler pass from Mason Heintschel failed (Drive: 2:37, Notre Dame 28–9)
- (1:39) ND – Adon Shuler PAT return (Drive: 5 plays, 14 yards, Notre Dame 30–9)

Fourth quarter

- (9:55) ND – CJ Carr 5-yard run, Erik Schmidt kick (Drive: 12 plays, 65 yards, 6:38, Notre Dame 37–9)
- (0:00) PITT – Malachi Thomas 21-yard pass from Eli Holstein (Drive: 12 plays, 79 yards, 2:49, Notre Dame 37–15)

Statistics	ND	PITT
First downs	20	17
Plays–yards	68–387	64–219
Rushes–yards	36–175	25–70
Passing yards	212	149
Passing: comp–att–int	21–32–2	19–39–1
Turnovers	2	1
Time of possession	35:17	24:43

Team	Category	Player	Statistics
Notre Dame	Passing	CJ Carr	21/32, 212 yards, 2 TD, 2 INT
Notre Dame	Rushing	Jeremiyah Love	23 carries, 147 yards, TD
Notre Dame	Receiving	Malachi Fields	7 receptions, 99 yards, 2 TD
Pittsburgh	Passing	Mason Heintschel	16/33, 126 yards, INT
Pittsburgh	Rushing	Juelz Goff	5 carries, 35 yards
Pittsburgh	Receiving	Desmond Reid	6 receptions, 63 yards

=== vs Syracuse ===
Syracuse Orange (3–7) at No. 9 Notre Dame Fighting Irish (8–2) – Game summary

Quarter	1	2	3	4	Total
Orange	0	0	0	7	7
No. 9 Fighting Irish	35	14	7	14	70

at Notre Dame Stadium • Notre Dame, Indiana

- Date: November 22
- Game time: 3:30 p.m.
- Game weather: Sunny, 47 °F (8 °C), Wind SW @ 6 mph (10 km/h)
- Game attendance: 77,622
- Referee: Mike Roche
- TV announcers (NBC): Dan Hicks (play-by-play), Jason Garrett (analyst) and Zora Stephenson (sideline)
- Box score, Recap

Game information

First quarter

- (14:03) ND – Jalen Stroman 44-yard interception return, Erik Schmidt kick (Drive: 0:50, Notre Dame 7–0)
- (12:19) ND – Luke Talich 22-yard punt return, Erik Schmidt kick (Drive: 1:38, Notre Dame 14–0)
- (9:43) ND – Leonard Moore 46-yard interception return, Erik Schmidt kick (Drive: 2:36, Notre Dame 21–0)
- (6:32) ND – Jeremiyah Love 45-yard run, Erik Schmidt kick (Drive: 2 plays, 59 yards, 0:36, Notre Dame 28–0)
- (4:01) ND – Jadarian Price 58-yard run, Erik Schmidt kick (Drive: 3 plays, 69 yards, 0:52, Notre Dame 35–0)

Second quarter

- (14:56) ND – Will Pauling 6-yard pass from CJ Carr, Erik Schmidt kick (Drive: 6 plays, 36 yards, 2:23, Notre Dame 42–0)
- (6:49) ND – Jeremiyah Love 14-yard run, Erik Schmidt kick (Drive: 4 plays, 59 yards, 3:46, Notre Dame 49–0)

Third quarter

- (14:23) ND – Jeremiyah Love 68-yard run, Erik Schmidt kick (Drive: 3 plays, 75 yards, 0:37, Notre Dame 56–0)

Fourth quarter

- (13:32) ND – Aneyas Williams 30-yard run, Erik Schmidt kick (Drive: 6 plays, 79 yards, 2:23, Notre Dame 63–0)
- (6:06) ND – Kenny Minchey 25-yard run, Erik Schmidt kick (Drive: 7 plays, 39 yards, 4:14, Notre Dame 70–0)
- (0:07) SYR – Joseph Filardi 6-yard run, Tripp Woody kick (Drive: 12 plays, 75 yards, 5:59, Notre Dame 70–7)

Statistics	SYR	ND
First downs	18	17
Plays–yards	80–207	39–396
Rushes–yards	50–112	24–329
Passing yards	95	67
Passing: comp–att–int	17–30–3	9–15–0
Turnovers	3	0
Time of possession	41:50	18:10

Team	Category	Player	Statistics
Syracuse	Passing	Joseph Filardi	14/26, 83 yards, 3 INT
Syracuse	Rushing	Joseph Filardi	14 carries, 33 yards, TD
Syracuse	Receiving	Dan Villari	5 receptions, 30 yards
Notre Dame	Passing	CJ Carr	5/9, 49 yards, TD
Notre Dame	Rushing	Jeremiyah Love	8 carries, 171 yards, 3 TD
Notre Dame	Receiving	Jordan Faison	2 receptions, 21 yards

=== at Stanford (rivalry) ===
No. 9 Notre Dame Fighting Irish (9–2) at Stanford Cardinal (4–7) – Game summary

Quarter	1	2	3	4	Total
No. 9 Fighting Irish	14	21	7	7	49
Cardinal	0	3	3	14	20

at Stanford Stadium • Stanford, California

- Date: November 29
- Game time: 10:30 p.m.
- Game weather: Sunny
- Game attendance: 27,456
- Referee: Darryl DeBarry
- TV announcers (ESPN): Dave Flemming (play-by-play), Brock Osweiler (analyst) and Stormy Buonantony (sideline)
- Box score, Recap

Game information

First quarter

- (8:43) ND – Jeremiyah Love 2-yard run, Erik Schmidt kick (Drive: 11 plays, 66 yards, 6:14, Notre Dame 7–0)
- (1:52) ND – Jadarian Price 1-yard run, Erik Schmidt kick (Drive: 11 plays, 61 yards, 5:27, Notre Dame 14–0)

Second quarter

- (14:33) ND – Luke Talich 84-yard pass from Joshua Burnham, Erik Schmidt kick (Drive: 4 plays, 85 yards, 0:55, Notre Dame 21–0)
- (7:26) ND – Aneyas Williams 2-yard run, Erik Schmidt kick (Drive: 8 plays, 54 yards, 3:21, Notre Dame 28–0)
- (2:38) STAN – Emmet Kenney 39-yard field goal (Drive: 12 plays, 54 yards, 4:48, Notre Dame 28–3)
- (0:17) ND – Jadarian Price 12-yard pass from CJ Carr, Erik Schmidt kick (Drive: 9 plays, 45 yards, 1:04, Notre Dame 35–3)

Third quarter

- (12:43) ND – Jordan Faison 6-yard pass from CJ Carr, Erik Schmidt kick (Drive: 4 plays, 77 yards, 1:51, Notre Dame 42–3)
- (2:09) STAN – Emmet Kenney 44-yard field goal (Drive: 15 plays, 61 yards, 7:36, Notre Dame 42–6)

Fourth quarter

- (12:15) STAN – Bryce Farrell 9-yard pass from Elijah Brown, Emmet Kenney kick (Drive: 7 plays, 91 yards, 2:45, Notre Dame 42–13)
- (9:08) ND – Aneyas Williams 51-yard run, Erik Schmidt kick (Drive: 6 plays, 75 yards, 3:07, Notre Dame 49–13)
- (4:00) STAN – Marcus Brown 3-yard pass from Charlie Mirer, Emmet Kenney kick (Drive: 12 plays, 80 yards, 5:04, Notre Dame 49–20)

Statistics	ND	STAN
First downs	24	16
Plays–yards	74–524	70–312
Rushes–yards	38–187	30–86
Passing yards	337	226
Passing: comp–att–int	23–36–0	20–40–1
Turnovers	0	1
Time of possession	30:35	29:25

Team	Category	Player	Statistics
Notre Dame	Passing	CJ Carr	17/27, 205 yards, 2 TD
Notre Dame	Rushing	Aneyas Williams	10 carries, 83 yards, 2 TD
Notre Dame	Receiving	Luke Talich	1 reception, 84 yards, TD
Stanford	Passing	Elijah Brown	18/37, 204 yards, TD, INT
Stanford	Rushing	Cole Tabb	11 carries, 32 yards
Stanford	Receiving	Sam Roush	4 receptions, 73 yards

== Personnel ==
=== Roster ===
2025 Notre Dame Fighting Irish football team roster
Players
Coaches
Offense

Pos.	#	Name	Class
WR	0	Malachi Fields	RSr
WR	1	Jaden Greathouse	Jr
WR	2	Will Pauling (C)	RSr
RB	3	Gi'Bran Payne	RJr
RB	4	Jeremiyah Love	Jr
WR	5	Cam Williams	RFr
WR	6	Jordan Faison	Jr
TE	7	Ty Washington	RJr
QB	8	Kenny Minchey	RSo
TE	9	Eli Raridon	Sr
QB	10	Tyler Buchner (W)	RSr
WR	11	KK Smith	RSo
QB	12	Blake Hebert	Fr
QB	13	CJ Carr	RFr
WR	14	Micah Gilbert	RFr
WR	15	Jerome Bettis Jr.	Fr
QB	16	Anthony Rezac (W)	So
WR	17	Elijah Burress	Fr
WR	19	Logan Saldate	RFr
RB	21	Kedren Young (injured)	RFr
RB	22	Aneyas Williams	So
RB	23	Nolan James Jr.	Fr
RB	24	Jadarian Price	RJr
RB	25	Dylan Devezin (injured) (W)	Sr
RB	26	Jake Tafelski (W)	RSr
TE	32	Justin Fisher (W)	Sr
WR	33	Matt Jeffery	RFr
TE	42	Henry Garrity (W)	Jr
OL	52	Devan Houstan	RSo
OL	54	Anthonie Knapp	So
OL	55	Chris Terek	RSo
OL	56	Charles Jagusah (injured)	RSo
OL	57	Cam Herron	Fr
OL	58	Matty Augustine	Fr
OL	59	Aamil Wagner (C)	RJr
OL	60	Max Anderson (W)	So
OL	61	Robbie Wollan (W)	So
OL	64	Joe Otting	RSo
OL	65	Will Black	Fr
OL	70	Ashton Craig (injured)	RJr
OL	71	Styles Prescod	RFr
OL	74	Billy Schrauth (injured) (C)	RJr
OL	75	Sullivan Absher	RSo
OL	76	Guerby Lambert	RFr
OL	77	Peter Jones (injured)	RFr
OL	78	Owen Strebig	Fr
WR	80	Xavier Southall (W)	So
WR	81	Scrap Richardson	Fr
WR	82	Leo Scheidler (W)	Sr
TE	85	Jack Larsen	RFr
WR	86	Alex Whitman (W)	Jr
TE	87	Cooper Flanagan (injured)	Jr
TE	88	James Flanigan	Fr

Defense

Pos.	#	Name	Class
CB	0	DeVonta Smith	RSr
LB	3	Jaylen Sneed	RJr
LB	4	Jaiden Ausberry	RSo
DL	5	Boubacar Traore	RSo
CB	6	Christian Gray	Jr
S	7	Jalen Stroman	RSr
S	8	Adon Shuler (C)	RSo
S	9	Tae Johnson (injured)	RFr
DL	10	Loghan Thomas	So
S	11	JaDon Blair	Fr
DL	12	Jordan Botelho	RSr
S	13	Ben Minich	RSo
CB	14	Dallas Golden	Fr
CB	15	Leonard Moore	So
DL	17	Brenan Vernon	RSo
CB	18	Chance Tucker (injured)	RSr
LB	19	Madden Faraimo	Fr
CB	20	Cree Thomas	Fr
CB	21	Karson Hobbs	So
S	22	Ethan Long	Fr
CB	24	Mark Zackery IV	Fr
DL	25	Preston Zinter	RSo
LB	27	Kyngstonn Viliamu-Asa (injured)	So
S	28	Luke Talich	Jr
S	29	Brandon Logan (injured)	Fr
DL	30	Dominik Hulak	Fr
S	31	Taebron Bennie-Powell	RFr
CB	32	Isaiah Dunn (W)	Sr
DL	33	Christopher Burgess Jr.	Fr
LB	34	Drayk Bowen (C)	Jr
LB	35	Teddy Rezac	RFr
LB	36	Bodie Kahoun	RFr
LB	38	Tommy Powlus (W)	So
LB	39	Anthony Sacca	Fr
DL	40	Joshua Burnham	RJr
DL	41	Donovan Hinish (C)	RJr
DL	42	Cole Mullins	RFr
LB	43	Kahanu Kia	RSo
DL	44	Junior Tuihalamaka	Sr
LB	45	Ko'o Kia	Fr
LB	46	Jerry Rullo (W)	Sr
DL	47	Jason Onye	RSr
CB	48	Mickey Brown (W)	Sr
CB	49	Charles Du (W)	Sr
DL	56	Elijah Hughes	Jr
DL	59	Sean Sevillano Jr. (injured)	RFr
DL	60	Davion Dixon	Fr
DL	88	Armel Mukam	RSo
DL	90	Kobi Onyiuke (W)	Sr
DL	91	Gordy Sulfsted	Fr
DL	93	Jared Dawson	RSr
DL	94	Joe Reiff	Fr
DL	95	Bryce Young	So
DL	97	Gabriel Rubio (injured)	RSr

Special teams

Pos.	#	Name	Class
P	16	James Rendell	RSr
K	18	Erik Schmidt	Fr
K	48	Marcello Diomede (W)	Jr
LS	49	Andrew Kros (W)	Jr
LS	96	Joseph Vinci	RFr
K	98	Noah Burnette (injured)	RSr

Head coach

- Marcus Freeman

Coordinators/assistant coaches

- Ja'Juan Seider – Associate head coach/running backs
- Mike Denbrock – Offensive coordinator/tight ends
- Chris Ash – Defensive coordinator
- Marty Biagi – Special teams coordinator/assistant defensive backs
- Gino Guidugli – Quarterbacks/pass game coordinator
- Mike Brown – Wide receivers
- Joe Rudolph – Offensive line
- Al Washington – Defensive line/defensive run game coordinator
- Max Bullough – Linebackers
- Mike Mickens – Defensive backs/defensive pass game coordinator

Legend

- (C) Team captain
- (S) Suspended
- (I) Ineligible
- (W) Walk-on
- Injured
- Redshirt

Roster
Last update: November 23, 2025

=== Depth chart ===
- Depth chart is a projection and is subject to change.

Defense

NB
DeVonta Smith
Dallas Golden
Karson Hobbs

FS
Jalen Stroman
Luke Talich
JaDon Blair

WLB	SLB
Jaiden Ausberry	Drayk Bowen
Jaylen Sneed	Madden Faraimo
Madden Faraimo	–

BS
Adon Shuler
Ethan Long
–

CB
Christian Gray
Mark Zackery IV
Cree Thomas

DE	DT	DT	DE
Bryce Young	Donovan Hinish	Jason Onye	Boubacar Traore
Joshua Burnham	Jared Dawson	Cole Mullins	Junior Tuihalamaka
Loghan Thomas	Elijah Hughes	–	Jordan Botelho

CB
Leonard Moore
Karson Hobbs
–

Offense

WR-X
Malachi Fields
Cam Williams
–

WR-F
Will Pauling
Logan Saldate
–

LT	LG	C	RG	RT
Anthonie Knapp	Sullivan Absher	Joe Otting	Guerby Lambert	Aamil Wagner
Styles Prescod	Chris Terek	Cam Herron	Sullivan Absher	Guerby Lambert
–	–	Chris Terek	–	–

TE
Eli Raridon
Ty Washington
Jack Larsen

WR-Z
Jordan Faison
KK Smith
Elijah Burress

QB
CJ Carr
Kenny Minchey
Tyler Buchner

Key reserves
RB Gi'Bran Payne
WR Micah Gilbert, Matt Jeffery
OL Devan Houstan
DL Armel Mukam, Brenan Vernon, Preston Zinter
LB Bodie Kahoun, Kahanu Kia, Teddy Rezac
S Taebron Bennie-Powell, Ben Minich
Injured Noah Burnette (K), Ashton Craig (OL), Cooper Flanagan (TE), Charles Jagusah (OL), Tae Johnson (S), Peter Jones (OL), Brandon Logan (S), Gabriel Rubio (DL), Billy Schrauth (OL), Sean Sevillano Jr. (DL), Chance Tucker (CB), Kyngstonn Viliamu-Asa (LB), Kedren Young (RB)

Special teams
PK Erik Schmidt
P James Rendell
KR Jadarian Price
PR Jordan Faison
LS Joseph Vinci
H Tyler Buchner

RB
Jeremiyah Love
Jadarian Price
Aneyas Williams
Nolan James Jr.
