= DeVonta Smith (cornerback) =

American football player (born 2002)

No. 43 – Carolina Panthers
- Position: Cornerback
- Roster status: Practice squad

Personal information
- Born: December 11, 2002 (age 23); Cincinnati, Ohio, U.S.
- Listed height: 5 ft 11 in (1.80 m)
- Listed weight: 195 lb (88 kg)

Career information
- High school: La Salle (Cincinnati, Ohio)
- College: Alabama (2021–2024); Notre Dame (2025)
- NFL draft: 2026: undrafted

Career history
- Carolina Panthers (2026–present)*
- * Offseason or practice squad member only
- Stats at Pro Football Reference

DeVonta Smith (born December 11, 2002) is an American football cornerback for the Carolina Panthers of the National Football League (NFL). He played College football for the Alabama Crimson Tide and Notre Dame Fighting Irish.

== Early life ==
Smith attended La Salle High School in Cincinnati, Ohio. As a junior, he had 38 tackles, a fumble recovery and three interceptions. Smith initially committed to play college football for the Ohio State Buckeyes, though he de-committed shortly afterwards. Ultimately, he signed to play for the Alabama Crimson Tide.

== College career ==
=== Alabama ===
In his first three seasons with the Crimson Tide from 2021 to 2023, Smith appeared in 23 games, primarily on special teams. He earned a starting spot in 2024, totaling 30 tackles, five pass deflections, and a forced fumble. After the conclusion of the season, Smith entered the NCAA transfer portal.

=== Notre Dame ===
Smith transferred to play for the Notre Dame Fighting Irish. He played just eight games in 2025 due to injury, recording 20 tackles and three pass deflections. After the conclusion of the season, Smith declared for the NFL draft, while also accepting an invite to the 2026 East-West Shrine Bowl.

=== Statistics ===
Year	Team	GP	Tackles				Interceptions				Fumbles		
Year	Team	GP	Total	Solo	Ast	Sack	PD	Int	Yds	TD	FF	FR	TD
2021	Alabama	9	2	1	1	0.0	0	0	0	0	0	0	0
2022	Alabama	9	0	0	0	0.0	0	0	0	0	0	0	0
2023	Alabama	4	4	3	1	0.0	0	0	0	0	0	0	0
2024	Alabama	12	30	18	12	0.0	5	0	0	0	1	0	0
2025	Notre Dame	8	20	18	2	0.0	3	0	0	0	0	1	0
Career		42	56	40	16	0.0	8	0	0	0	1	1	0

== Professional career ==
Pre-draft measurables
Height	Weight	Arm length	Hand span	Wingspan	40-yard dash	10-yard split	20-yard split	20-yard shuttle	Three-cone drill	Vertical jump	Broad jump	Bench press
5 ft 10 3/4 in (1.80 m)	186 lb (84 kg)	31 1/4 in (0.79 m)	9 3/8 in (0.24 m)	6 ft 3 1/2 in (1.92 m)	4.58 s	1.58 s	2.57 s	4.15 s	6.91 s	43.0 in (1.09 m)	11 ft 0 in (3.35 m)	13 reps
All values from Pro Day

After not being selected in the 2026 NFL draft, Smith signed with the Carolina Panthers as an undrafted free agent. Smith was waived by Carolina on August 30, 2026, as a part of final roster cuts; he was re–signed to the team's practice squad the next day.
