= Christian Gray (American football) =

American football player (born 2005)

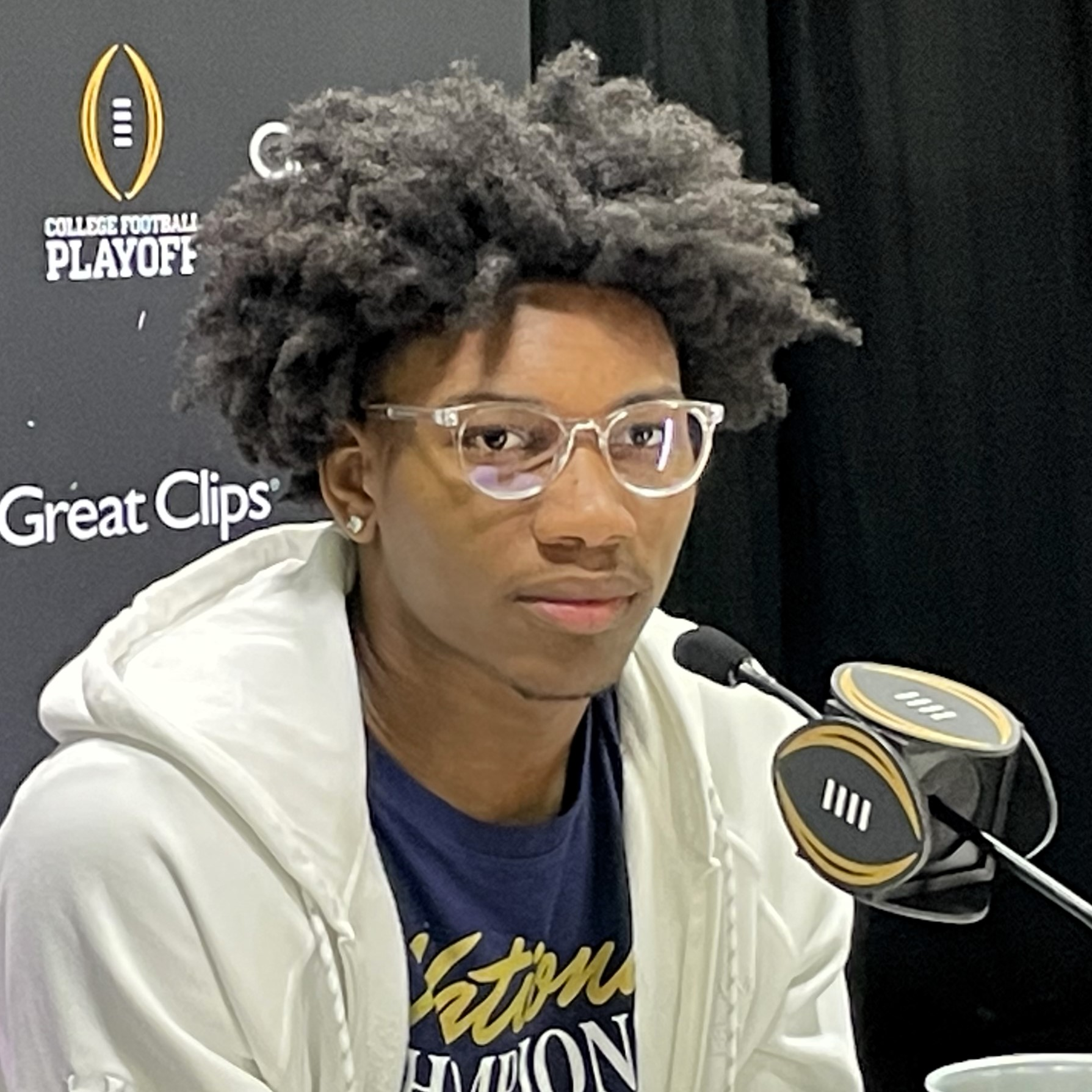
- Gray talking to press ahead of the 2025 CFP National Championship.

No. 29 – Notre Dame Fighting Irish
- Position: Cornerback
- Class: Senior

Personal information
- Born: May 26, 2005 (age 21)
- Listed height: 6 ft 0 in (1.83 m)
- Listed weight: 196 lb (89 kg)

Career information
- High school: De Smet Jesuit (Creve Coeur, Missouri)
- College: Notre Dame (2023–present)
- Stats at ESPN

Christian Amir Gray (born May 26, 2005) is an American college football cornerback for the Notre Dame Fighting Irish.

== Early life ==
Gray attended De Smet Jesuit High School in Creve Coeur, Missouri. He was rated as a four-star recruit and committed to play college football for the Notre Dame Fighting Irish over offers from schools such as Alabama, LSU, USC, and Ohio State.

== College career ==
As a freshman in 2023, Gray appeared in 12 games for Notre Dame, where he notched 11 tackles, two pass deflections, and an interception. He entered the 2024 season as one of the starting cornerbacks for the Fighting Irish. In the 2024 regular season finale, Gray returned an interception 99 yards for a touchdown in a win versus USC which clinched a CFP bid. In the 2025 Orange Bowl against Penn State, Gray recorded a late interception of Penn State quarterback Drew Allar that helped set up the game winning field goal. The Irish advanced to the National Championship against Ohio State, where they lost 34–23.

=== College statistics ===
Year	Team	GP	Tackles				Interceptions				Fumbles		
Year	Team	GP	Total	Solo	Ast	Sack	PD	Int	Yds	TD	FF	FR	TD
2023	Notre Dame	12	11	9	2	0.0	2	1	0	0	0	0	0
2024	Notre Dame	15	35	26	9	0.0	9	3	99	1	1	0	0
2025	Notre Dame	10	17	11	6	0.0	11	2	19	0	0	0	0
2026	Notre Dame	3	4	2	2	0.0	1	0	0	0	0	0	0
Career		40	67	48	19	0.0	23	6	118	1	1	0	0
