= Zak Zinter =

American football player (born 2001)

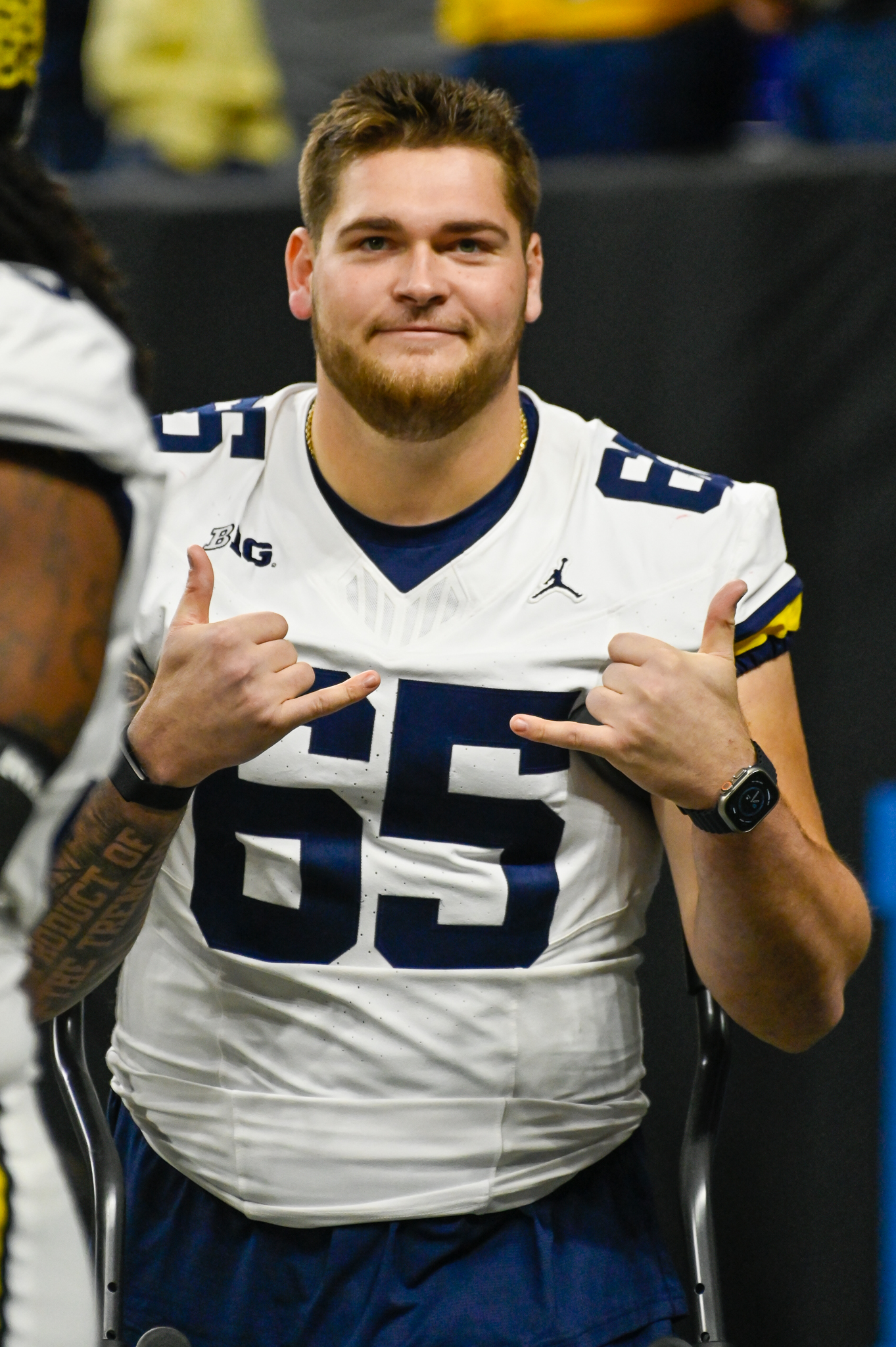
- Zinter with the Michigan Wolverines in 2023

No. 70 – Cleveland Browns
- Position: Guard
- Roster status: Active

Personal information
- Born: April 17, 2001 (age 25); Port St. Lucie, Florida, U.S.
- Listed height: 6 ft 6 in (1.98 m)
- Listed weight: 310 lb (141 kg)

Career information
- High school: Buckingham Browne & Nichols (Cambridge, Massachusetts)
- College: Michigan (2020–2023)
- NFL draft: 2024: 3rd round, 85th overall pick

Career history
- Cleveland Browns (2024–present)

Awards and highlights
- CFP national champion (2023); Unanimous All-American (2023); 2× first-team All-Big Ten (2022, 2023); Second-team All-Big Ten (2021)

Career NFL statistics as of 2025
- Games played: 22
- Games started: 3
- Stats at Pro Football Reference

Zak Lyle Zinter (born April 17, 2001) is an American professional football guard for the Cleveland Browns of the National Football League (NFL). He played college football for the Michigan Wolverines, winning three consecutive Big Ten Conference titles and a national championship in 2023. He was a three-time All-Big Ten selection and a unanimous All-American. Zinter was selected by the Browns in the third round of the 2024 NFL draft.

== Early life ==
Zinter was born in Port St. Lucie, Florida on April 17, 2001, the son of Paul and Tiffany Zinter. He lived in Florida until middle school, when his family moved to North Andover, Massachusetts. Zinter attended St. John’s Prep for the first two years of his high school career, before transferring to Buckingham Browne & Nichols. He played both football and track and field, excelling at both. Zinter was a three-year starter along the offensive line, with one year at St. John’s Prep and two at BB&N. As a junior, he led BB&N to an 8-1 record and title game appearances in the Independent School League and New England championships.

Zinter was a two-time Massachusetts High School Football Coaches Association All-State selection, USA Today All-Massachusetts in 2018, and on the Super 26 All-State Team in 2019. He was also the NEPSAC All-New England Lineman of the Year in 2019. As a junior, he was the NEPSAC New England State Shot Put Champion, breaking and still holding his school record with a distance of 49’-7”.

PrepStar Magazine listed Zinter as a Top 150 Dream Team member, rated as the top prospect in Massachusetts, the 17th-best offensive tackle in the country and the nation’s 123rd overall recruit. He committed to play college football at the University of Michigan, over Notre Dame, Ohio State and Boston College.

== College career ==
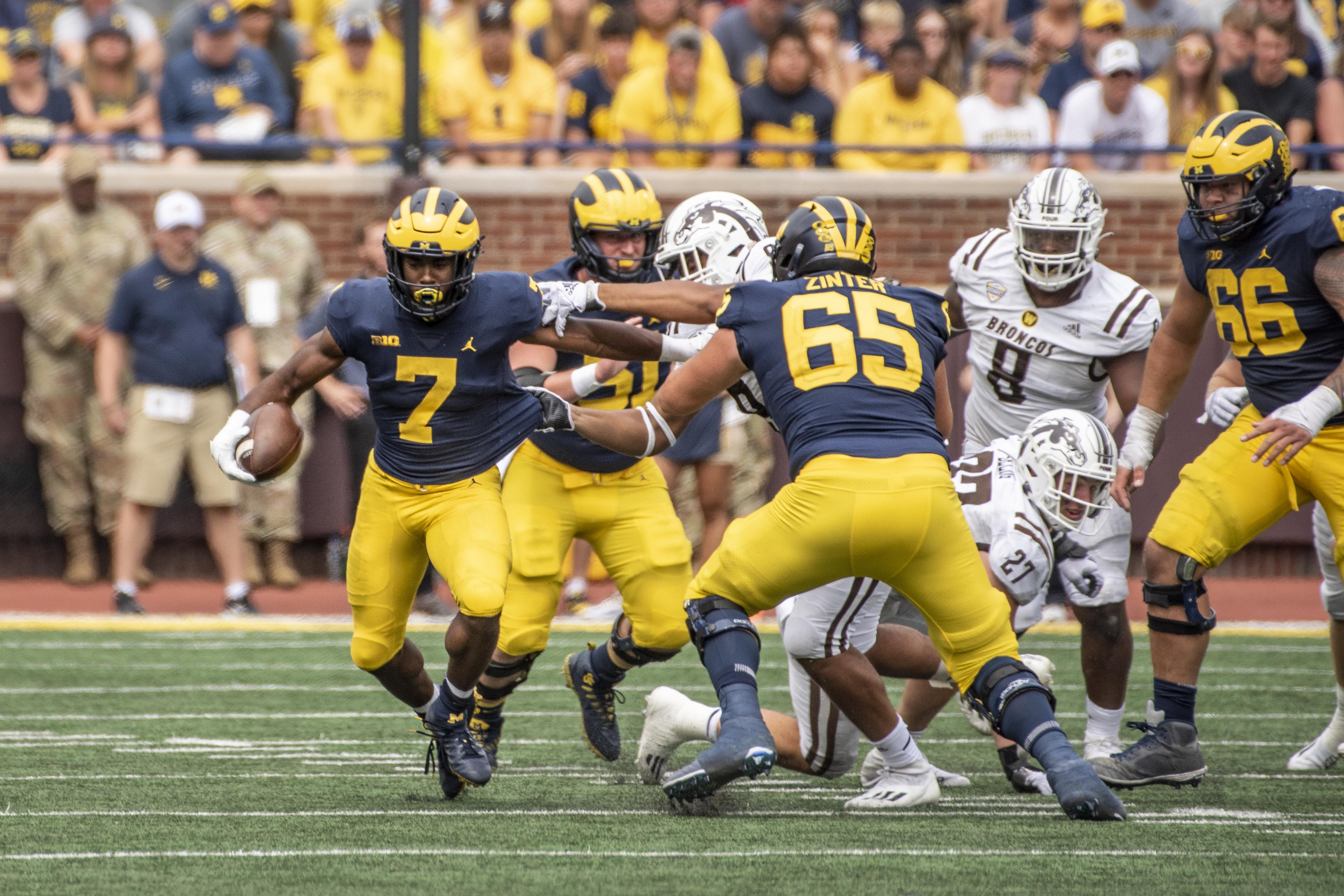
Zinter blocking for Donovan Edwards (No. 7) in 2021

Zinter enrolled at the University of Michigan in 2020. As a true freshman, he started 4 games for Michigan. In 2021, he was part of Michigan's offensive line that won the Joe Moore Award. Zinter started 12 games and was named second-team All-Big Ten.

In 2022, Zinter started 14 games, and was selected by the conference coaches as a first-team offensive guard on the All-Big Ten team. All three of Michigan's interior offensive lineman (Zinter, Olusegun Oluwatimi, and Trevor Keegan) were named to the first-team by the conference coaches. In doing so Michigan won back-to-back Joe Moore Award’s, and Zinter was named to the Outland Trophy watch list.

On November 25, 2023, in the victory against rival Ohio State, Zinter sustained a broken tibia and fibula and was taken off the field on a cart. He missed the remainder of the season.

Despite the injury, Zinter started 12 games for Michigan’s national championship team, was selected to the All-Big Ten team for a third consecutive season, and was named a unanimous All-American in 2023.

== Professional career ==
Pre-draft measurables
Height	Weight	Arm length	Hand span	Wingspan
6 ft 5 7/8 in (1.98 m)	309 lb (140 kg)	33 1/2 in (0.85 m)	9 3/8 in (0.24 m)	6 ft 9 1/8 in (2.06 m)
All values from NFL Combine

Zinter was selected 85th overall by the Cleveland Browns in the third round of the 2024 NFL draft.

In his rookie season, Zinter appeared in all 17 games, starting two games at right guard and an additional start as an extra lineman.

== Personal life ==
Zinter's younger brother, Preston, played for the Notre Dame Fighting Irish and is currently playing for the Rice Owls.
