= Preston Zinter =

American football player (born 2004)

No. 9 – Rice Owls
- Position: Tight end
- Class: Senior

Personal information
- Born: January 24, 2004 (age 22)
- Listed height: 6 ft 1 in (1.85 m)
- Listed weight: 254 lb (115 kg)

Career information
- High school: Central Catholic (North Andover, Massachusetts)
- College: Notre Dame (2023–2025); Rice (2026–present)
- Stats at ESPN

Preston Grant Zinter (born January 24, 2004) is an American college football tight end for the Rice Owls of the American Conference. He previously played for the Notre Dame Fighting Irish as a linebacker and defensive end.

== Early life ==
Zinter played for Central Catholic High School. He received several collegiate scholarship offers during his time at the school. He was named to the all-state team by the Massachusetts High School Football Association in 2021.

== College career ==
=== Notre Dame ===
Zinter committed to Notre Dame in February 2022. He officially signed with the team in December of the same year. He enrolled with the school early, in February 2023. He was redshirted in 2023, and played as a reserve linebacker during the 2024 season. He played in all sixteen games of the season.

In 2025, Zinter switched to play as a defensive end and led the team in special teams snaps. As of the end of the 2025 ncaa season, he has nine career tackles. He entered the NCAA transfer portal in January 2026.

=== Rice ===
On January 13, 2026, Zinter committed to the Rice Owls as a tight end.

=== Statistics ===
Year	Team	GP	Tackles				Interceptions				Fumbles		
Year	Team	GP	Total	Solo	Ast	Sack	PD	Int	Yds	TD	FF	FR	TD
2023	Notre Dame	4	2	1	1	0.0	0	0	0	0	0	0	0
2024	Notre Dame	16	4	4	0	0.0	0	0	0	0	0	0	0
2025	Notre Dame	10	2	2	0	0.0	0	0	0	0	0	0	0
2026	Rice	2	0	0	0	0.0	0	0	0	0	0	0	0
Career		32	8	7	1	0.0	0	0	0	0	0	0	0

== Personal life ==
Zinter's brother, Zak, played for the Michigan Wolverines at the time that Zinter committed to Notre Dame.
