= Luke Talich =

American football safety (born 2004)

No. 28 – Notre Dame Fighting Irish
- Position: Safety
- Class: Senior

Personal information
- Born: July 7, 2004 (age 22)
- Listed height: 6 ft 4 in (1.93 m)
- Listed weight: 222 lb (101 kg)

Career information
- High school: Cody (Cody, Wyoming)
- College: Notre Dame (2023–present)
- Stats at ESPN

Lucas Wayne Talich (born July 7, 2004) is an American college football safety for the Notre Dame Fighting Irish.

== Early life ==
Talich grew up in Cody, Wyoming and attended Cody High School, where he played basketball and football and competed in track and field. As Cody's starting quarterback during his senior year, he passed for 1,682 yards while also rushing for 582 yards and accounted for 25 touchdowns. Talich was rated a three-star recruit and the top college prospect in Wyoming. He committed to play college football as a preferred walk-on for Notre Dame over scholarship offers from Washington State, Utah, and Wyoming.

== College career ==
Talich initially intended on redshirting his true freshman season at the University of Notre Dame, but due to injuries on defense and special teams played in the first eight games of the season before suffering a broken collarbone. He was awarded a scholarship during spring practices. Talich returned an interception 79 yards for a touchdown against Florida State during his sophomore year.

=== College statistics ===
Year	Team	GP	Tackles				Interceptions				Fumbles		
Year	Team	GP	Total	Solo	Ast	Sack	PD	Int	Yds	TD	FF	FR	TD
2023	Notre Dame	8	2	2	0	0.0	0	0	0	0	0	0	0
2024	Notre Dame	16	20	14	6	0.0	0	1	79	1	1	0	0
2025	Notre Dame	12	25	19	6	0.0	3	3	4	0	0	0	0
2026	Notre Dame	3	11	9	2	1.0	1	1	0	0	1	0	0
Career		39	58	44	14	1.0	4	5	83	1	2	0	0

== Personal life ==
Talich's father, Jim, played linebacker for the University of Wyoming, where his older brother Nicolas currently plays. His mother, Jen, played college basketball at Montana State.
