= Drayk Bowen =

American football and baseball player (born 2004)

- Bowen before the Navy–Notre Dame game in 2026

No. 34 – Notre Dame Fighting Irish
- Position: Linebacker
- Class: Senior

Personal information
- Born: April 29, 2004 (age 22); Kalamazoo, Michigan, U.S.
- Listed height: 6 ft 2 in (1.88 m)
- Listed weight: 234 lb (106 kg)

Career information
- High school: Andrean (Merrillville, Indiana)
- College: Notre Dame (2023–present)

Awards and highlights
- High school Butkus Award (2022); Indiana Mr. Football (2022)
- Stats at ESPN

Drayk Hudson Bowen (born April 29, 2004) is an American college football linebacker for the Notre Dame Fighting Irish.

== Early life ==
Bowen attended Andrean High School in Merrillville, Indiana. He played both linebacker and running back in high school. As a senior in 2022, he had 144 tackles, five sacks and three interceptions as a linebacker and rushed for 1,784 yards with 26 touchdowns as a running back. Bowen won the Butkus Award, given to the top high school linebacker in the country, and was named the Post-Tribune Football Player of the Year. He was also named the Indiana Gatorade Football Player of the Year his junior and senior seasons. For his career, he had 379 tackles, 16 tackles, six interceptions, 2,969 rushing yards and 49 touchdowns.

Bowen was selected to play in the 2023 All-American Bowl, where he was named their Defensive Player of the Year. He committed to the University of Notre Dame to play college football.

== College career ==
As a true freshman at Notre Dame in 2023, Bowen played in 12 games and had 14 tackles. In the spring 2024, he appeared in three games for the baseball team. As a sophomore in 2024, he took over as a starting linebacker. He retired from baseball before the 2025 season.

=== College football statistics ===
Year	Team	GP	Tackles				Interceptions				Fumbles		
Year	Team	GP	Total	Solo	Ast	Sack	PD	Int	Yds	TD	FF	FR	TD
2023	Notre Dame	12	14	8	6	0.0	0	0	0	0	1	0	0
2024	Notre Dame	16	78	40	38	1.0	2	0	0	0	3	0	0
2025	Notre Dame	12	67	33	34	3.5	4	0	0	0	0	0	0
2026	Notre Dame	3	19	11	8	0.0	0	0	0	0	0	0	0
Career		43	178	92	86	4.5	6	0	0	0	4	0	0
