= Will Black =

Canadian gridiron football player (born 2006)

No. 74 – Notre Dame Fighting Irish
- Position: Offensive tackle
- Class: Sophomore

Personal information
- Born: February 5, 2006 (age 20)
- Listed height: 6 ft 7 in (2.01 m)
- Listed weight: 316 lb (143 kg)

Career information
- High school: Choate Rosemary Hall (Wallingford, Connecticut)
- College: Notre Dame (2025–present)
- Stats at ESPN

William Black (born February 5, 2006) is a Canadian college football offensive tackle for the Notre Dame Fighting Irish.

== Early life ==
Raised in London, Ontario, Black played high school football at A.B Lucas Secondary School in London, Ontario, until he transferred to Choate Rosemary Hall in Wallingford, Connecticut. He was selected to play in the All-American Bowl. Black was one of the most highly recruited players in the 2025 college football recruiting class. He was rated as the No. 2 and No. 19 recruit nationally by On3.com and Rivals.com, respectively. He committed to Notre Dame in December 2023. He signed a letter of intent on early signing day in December 2024.
