= Jadarian Price =

American football player (born 2003)

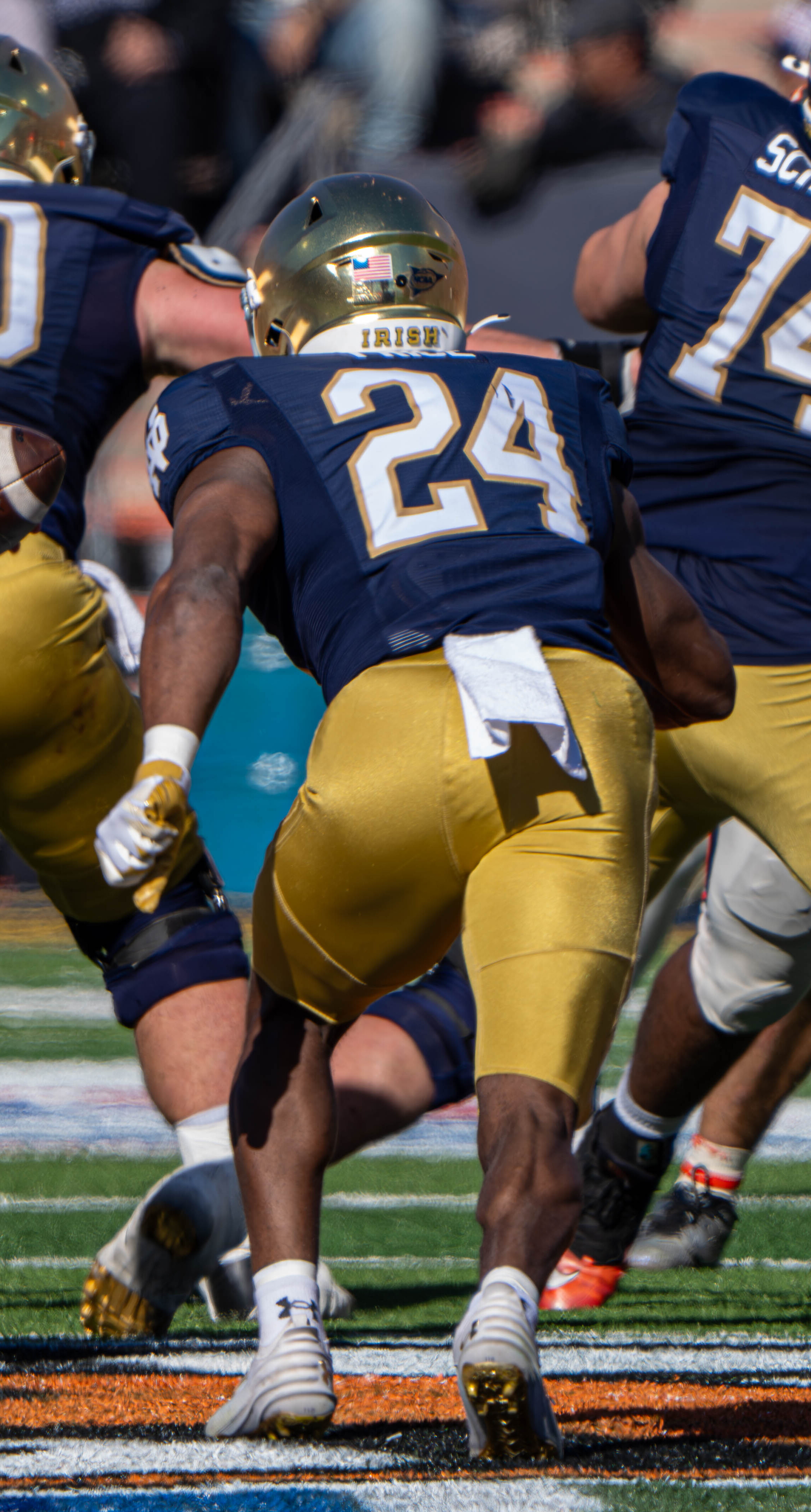
- Price with the Notre Dame Fighting Irish in 2023

No. 8 – Seattle Seahawks
- Position: Running back
- Roster status: Active

Personal information
- Born: October 9, 2003 (age 23); Denison, Texas, U.S.
- Listed height: 5 ft 11 in (1.80 m)
- Listed weight: 209 lb (95 kg)

Career information
- High school: Denison
- College: Notre Dame (2022–2025)
- NFL draft: 2026: 1st round, 32nd overall pick

Career history
- Seattle Seahawks (2026−present)

Career NFL statistics as of Week 11, 2026
- Rushing yards: 208
- Rushing average: 3.7
- Rushing touchdowns: 1
- Receptions: 11
- Receiving yards: 91
- Stats at Pro Football Reference

Jadarian Dion Price (born October 9, 2003) is an American professional football running back for the Seattle Seahawks of the National Football League (NFL). He played college football for the Notre Dame Fighting Irish and was selected by the Seahawks in the first round of the 2026 NFL draft.

== Early life ==
Price attended Denison High School in Denison, Texas. He committed to the University of Notre Dame to play college football over offers from Ohio State, Texas, and USC, among others.

== College career ==
Price missed his entire freshman year due to a ruptured achilles injury. As a redshirt freshman, he played in every game as a contributor on both offense and special teams, and finished the season with 272 rushing yards, averaging 5.8 yards per carry, and scoring three rushing touchdowns. In a game against USC, Price returned a kickoff 99 yards for a touchdown.

During the 2025 season, Price scored 15 total touchdowns (11 rushing, 2 receiving and 2 kickoff returns) in 12 games, despite serving as the team's backup running back behind Heisman-finalist Jeremiyah Love.

In his final two seasons at Notre Dame (2024 and 2025), Price rushed for 1,420 yards with a 6.1 yards per carry average and 18 touchdowns as the team's secondary running back.

Price returned three kickoffs for touchdowns on only 22 total returns during his Fighting-Irish career and was named a first-team All-American as a kick returner in 2025. Two of his three kickoff-return touchdowns came against Notre Dame's archrival USC, one during a 48–20 win in 2023 that essentially sealed the victory after a brief USC rally and another during a 34–24 win in 2025 that gave Notre Dame a third-quarter lead, which would not be relinquished.

In December 2025, Price announced that he was entering in the 2026 NFL draft.

=== Statistics ===
Year	Team	Games		Rushing					Receiving				
Year	Team	GP	GS	Att	Yds	Avg	Lng	TD	Rec	Yds	Avg	Lng	TD
2022	Notre Dame	0	0	DNP									
2023	Notre Dame	13	0	47	272	5.8	54	3	5	65	13.0	40	1
2024	Notre Dame	16	0	120	746	6.2	70	7	4	10	2.5	8	0
2025	Notre Dame	12	0	113	674	6.0	58	11	6	87	14.5	35	2
Career		41	0	280	1,692	6.0	70	21	15	162	10.8	40	3

== Professional career ==
Pre-draft measurables
Height	Weight	Arm length	Hand span	Wingspan	40-yard dash	10-yard split	20-yard split	20-yard shuttle	Vertical jump	Broad jump	Bench press
5 ft 10 5/8 in (1.79 m)	203 lb (92 kg)	30 7/8 in (0.78 m)	9 5/8 in (0.24 m)	6 ft 4 1/2 in (1.94 m)	4.49 s	1.61 s	2.62 s	4.28 s	35.0 in (0.89 m)	10 ft 4 in (3.15 m)	21 reps
All values from NFL Combine/Pro Day

Price was selected by the Seattle Seahawks in the first round, with the 32nd overall pick, of the 2026 NFL draft. On May 29, 2026, he signed a four-year, $16.7 million contract with the Seahawks.

In week 10 of the 2026 season versus the Las Vegas Raiders, Price scored his first career touchdown on a 12 yard rush.
