= Eli Raridon =

American football player (born 2004)

No. 82 – New England Patriots
- Position: Tight end
- Roster status: Active

Personal information
- Born: February 12, 2004 (age 22); Mason City, Iowa, U.S.
- Listed height: 6 ft 6 in (1.98 m)
- Listed weight: 245 lb (111 kg)

Career information
- High school: Valley (West Des Moines, Iowa)
- College: Notre Dame (2022–2025)
- NFL draft: 2026: 3rd round, 95th overall pick

Career history
- New England Patriots (2026–present)

Career NFL statistics as of Week 10, 2026
- Receptions: 17
- Receiving yards: 231
- Receiving touchdowns: 2
- Stats at Pro Football Reference

Elijah Daniel Raridon (born February 12, 2004) is an American professional football tight end for the New England Patriots of the National Football League (NFL). He played college football for the Notre Dame Fighting Irish and was selected by the Patriots in the third round of the 2026 NFL draft.

== Early life ==
Raridon attended Valley High School in West Des Moines, Iowa. As a senior, he had 53 receptions for 627 yards and 10 touchdowns. He was ranked among the top tight ends in his class and committed to the University of Notre Dame to play college football.

== College career ==
Raridon spent the first three years at Notre Dame as a backup, recording 16 receptions for 141 yards and three touchdowns over 28 games. He took over as the starter his senior season in 2025. In the first game of the season, he had five receptions for 97 yards.

=== Statistics ===
Year	Team	GP	Receiving			
Year	Team	GP	Rec	Yds	Avg	TD
2022	Notre Dame	5	0	0	–	0
2023	Notre Dame	7	5	51	10.2	1
2024	Notre Dame	16	11	90	8.2	2
2025	Notre Dame	12	32	482	15.1	0
Career		40	48	623	13.0	3

== Professional career ==
Pre-draft measurables
Height	Weight	Arm length	Hand span	Wingspan	40-yard dash	10-yard split	20-yard split	20-yard shuttle	Three-cone drill	Vertical jump	Broad jump	Bench press
6 ft 6 1/8 in (1.98 m)	245 lb (111 kg)	32 3/4 in (0.83 m)	10 3/4 in (0.27 m)	6 ft 8 in (2.03 m)	4.62 s	1.60 s	2.70 s	4.38 s	7.16 s	36.0 in (0.91 m)	10 ft 3 in (3.12 m)	22 reps
All values from NFL Combine/Pro Day

Raridon was selected by the New England Patriots in the third round with the 95th overall pick in the 2026 NFL draft. Raridon scored the first touchdown of his career, and the first touchdown of the 2026 NFL season, on his first-ever NFL reception from Drake Maye in the Patriots' Week 1 loss to the Seattle Seahawks.

== Personal life ==
His grandfather, Scott Raridon Sr., played offensive line for Nebraska and was a sixth-round draft pick of the Philadelphia Eagles in the 1984 NFL draft, and was a strength coach on Notre Dame's 1988 National Championship team. His father, Scott Raridon Jr., also played college football at Notre Dame.

Raridon married his high school sweetheart, Anna Bernhard, in May 2025. Their son, Peter James Raridon, was born on September 11th, 2026, and died shortly afterward from anencephaly.
