= Jeremiyah Love =

American football player (born 2005)

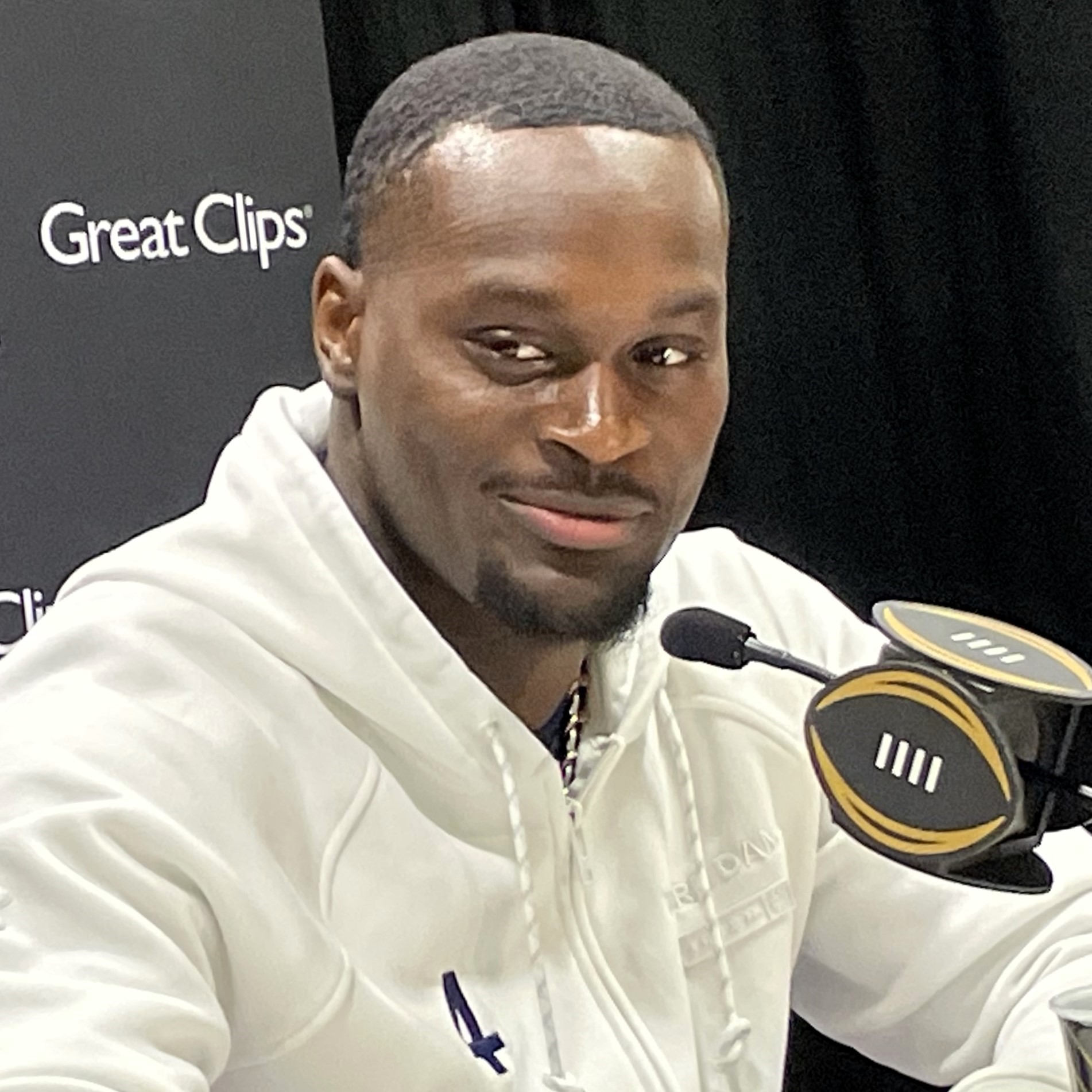
- Love in 2025

No. 4 – Arizona Cardinals
- Position: Running back
- Roster status: Injured reserve

Personal information
- Born: May 31, 2005 (age 21); University City, Missouri, U.S.
- Listed height: 6 ft 0 in (1.83 m)
- Listed weight: 212 lb (96 kg)

Career information
- High school: Christian Brothers (Town and Country, Missouri)
- College: Notre Dame (2023–2025)
- NFL draft: 2026: 1st round, 3rd overall pick

Career history
- Arizona Cardinals (2026–present)

Awards and highlights
- Doak Walker Award (2025); Unanimous All-American (2025)

Career NFL statistics as of Week 4, 2026
- Rushing yards: 223
- Rushing average: 4.1
- Rushing touchdowns: 1
- Stats at Pro Football Reference

Jeremiyah Darnell Love (born May 31, 2005) is an American professional football running back for the Arizona Cardinals of the National Football League (NFL). He played college football for the Notre Dame Fighting Irish, winning the 2025 Doak Walker Award before being selected third overall by the Cardinals in the 2026 NFL draft.

== Early life ==
Love was born on May 31, 2005 in the University City, Missouri a suburb of St. Louis. His mother, L'Tonya, served as a sergeant with the St. Louis Police Department, while his father, Jason, is an Army veteran who coached him in youth football. Love grew up in the Walnut Park neighborhood of St. Louis. He attended Christian Brothers College High School in St. Louis, Missouri, where he played football and basketball and competed in track and field as a sprinter for Christian Brothers. As a sophomore, he won a Missouri state championship in the 100-meter dash with a time of 10.76 seconds. As a junior, he rushed for 996 yards and 14 touchdowns, helping lead the team to the MSHSAA Class 6 state championship, and was named first-team All-State by the Missouri Football Coaches Association.

As a senior, Love tallied 1,291 yards and 22 touchdowns on 140 carries and added 13 receptions for 370 yards and five touchdowns. After recording 317 total yards (211 rushing, 106 receiving) and five touchdowns in the MSHSAA Class 6A State Championship win over Lee's Summit North, he was named Metro Catholic Conference Offensive Player of the Year and Missouri Class 6 Offensive Player of the Year, as well as MaxPreps Missouri High School Football Player of the Year, Missouri Gatorade Player of the Year, and an Under Armour All-American. He was again named first-team All-State by the Missouri Football Coaches Association and was also honored with the Watkins Award in recognition of his academic excellence. Coming out of high school, Love was rated as a four-star recruit, the 59th best player, and the 4th best running back in the class of 2023 by Rivals.com. Love committed to play college football for the Notre Dame Fighting Irish over Texas A&M, Michigan, Alabama, and Oregon.

== College career ==
=== 2023 season ===
Love spent his freshmen season as the fifth-string running back behind Audric Estimé, Gi'Bran Payne, Jadarian Price, and Devyn Ford, but still played in every game. In the 2023 home opener, Love rushed for his first career touchdown on a 36-yard run in a win over Tennessee State. He finished his first collegiate season rushing 71 times for 385 yards and a touchdown, while also bringing in eight receptions for 77 yards and a touchdown.

=== 2024 season ===
Love entered the 2024 season as the starting running back for the Fighting Irish following the departure of fellow running back Audric Estimé. Love finished the 2024 season with 1,125 yards and 17 touchdowns on the ground, and 28 catches for 237 yards and 2 touchdowns in the air, including a school-record 13 consecutive games with a rushing touchdown. This included an appearance in the College Football Playoff, highlighted by key performances and plays in games by Love. These performances and plays included a 98-yard touchdown run in the first round of the playoffs against Indiana. Ultimately, Love and the Fighting Irish fell short in the National Championship against Ohio State.

=== 2025 season ===
Entering the season, Love was named to multiple award watch lists. On October 11 against NC State, he rushed for 86 yards and two touchdowns, becoming the fourth-fastest player in Notre Dame history to reach 2,000 career rushing yards. The following week against USC, he rushed for a career-high 228 yards and a touchdown, the most by a Fighting Irish player at Notre Dame Stadium and the sixth-most in a single game in program history. On November 1 against Boston College, Love rushed for 143 yards and two touchdowns, including a 94-yard scoring run, becoming the first player in program history to record two 90-yard rushing touchdowns in a career. In the regular-season finale on November 29 against Stanford, he rushed for 69 yards and a touchdown, surpassing Jerome Bettis for the most total touchdowns in a single season in school history with 21, while tying Audric Estimé's single-season rushing touchdown record with 18.

Notre Dame concluded the 2025 season with a 10–2 record and was controversially excluded from the College Football Playoff. Love rushed 1,372 yards and 18 touchdowns, and added 27 receptions for 280 yards and three touchdowns. He was named a finalist for the Heisman Trophy, the Maxwell Award, the Walter Camp Award, the Pony Express Award, and the Capital One Orange Bowl-FWAA Courage Award. He won the Doak Walker Award, becoming the first in Notre Dame's history, as well as the Disney's Wide World of Sports Spirit Award and a semifinalist for the Heisman Trophy. He also earned unanimous All-American honors and declared for the NFL draft following the season.

=== Statistics ===
College statistics
Season	Team	Games		Rushing					Receiving				
Season	Team	GP	GS	Att	Yds	Avg	Lng	TD	Rec	Yds	Avg	Lng	TD
2023	Notre Dame	13	1	71	385	5.4	36	1	8	77	9.6	33	1
2024	Notre Dame	16	16	163	1,125	6.9	98	17	28	237	8.5	32	2
2025	Notre Dame	12	12	199	1,372	6.9	94	18	27	280	10.4	36	3
Career		41	29	433	2,882	6.7	98	36	63	594	9.4	36	6

== Professional career ==
Pre-draft measurables
Height	Weight	Arm length	Hand span	Wingspan	40-yard dash	10-yard split	20-yard split
6 ft 0 in (1.83 m)	212 lb (96 kg)	32 in (0.81 m)	9 1/8 in (0.23 m)	6 ft 6 5/8 in (2.00 m)	4.36 s	1.55 s	2.53 s
All values from NFL Combine

Love was selected by the Arizona Cardinals with the third overall pick of the 2026 NFL draft. On May 8, 2026, he signed a four-year, $53 million contract with the Cardinals, making him the best paid Running Back in the history of the NFL by total contract value. Love made his professional debut on August 13, 2026 during the team's first preseason game against the Las Vegas Raiders, where he rushed for 58 yards on 11 carries until an ankle injury forced him out of the game. It was later determined that Love had suffered a high ankle sprain, putting his chances of making the season opener on the line.

In the Cardinals' Week 1 matchup against the Los Angeles Chargers, Love scored his first career rushing touchdown on a five-yard run. After Week 8, Love was placed on injured reserve due to a high ankle sprain that will keep him out of action for 4-5 weeks.

== Personal life ==
As a child Love's parents were concerned that he could have autism and consulted a doctor, but declined to pursue a formal diagnosis. Love is a fan of anime, with it influencing him to create his own comic book series titled Jeremonstar that details a world of football action with supernatural abilities featuring himself.
