= 2022 Gator Bowl =

Postseason college football bowl game

2022 TaxSlayer Gator Bowl
- 78th Gator Bowl
| Notre Dame Fighting Irish | South Carolina Gamecocks |
| (8–4) | (8–4) |
| Independent | SEC |
| 45 | 38 |
| Head coach: Marcus Freeman | Head coach: Shane Beamer |
| AP / Coaches / CFP; 19 / 20 / 21 | AP / Coaches / CFP; 20 / 19 / 19 |
| | 1 | 2 | 3 | 4 | Total |
|---|---|---|---|---|---|
| Notre Dame | 7 | 10 | 14 | 14 | 45 |
| South Carolina | 21 | 3 | 7 | 7 | 38 |
- Date: December 30, 2022
- Season: 2022
- Stadium: TIAA Bank Field
- Location: Jacksonville, Florida
- MVP: Tyler Buchner (QB, Notre Dame)
- Favorite: Notre Dame by 5.5
- Referee: Mike Cannon (Big Ten)
- Attendance: 67,383
- Payout: US$5,350,000

United States TV coverage
- Network: ESPN
- Announcers: Taylor Zarzour (play-by-play), Matt Stinchcomb (analyst), and Alyssa Lang (sideline)

International TV coverage
- Network: ESPN Deportes

The 2022 Gator Bowl was a college football bowl game played on December 30, 2022, at TIAA Bank Field in Jacksonville, Florida. The 78th annual Gator Bowl, the game featured Notre Dame, an FBS Independent, and South Carolina of the Southeastern Conference (SEC). The game began at 3:40 p.m. EST and was aired on ESPN. It was one of the 2022–23 bowl games concluding the 2022 FBS football season. Sponsored by financial technology company TaxSlayer, the game was officially known as the TaxSlayer Gator Bowl.

Notre Dame defeated South Carolina with a final score of 45–38.

With 5.766 million viewers, the 2022 Gator Bowl was the highest rated non-New Year’s Six bowl game of the 2022–23 season. It was also the highest-scoring Gator Bowl in history, with a combined 83 points.

== Teams ==
Based on conference tie-ins, the game was expected to feature teams from the Atlantic Coast Conference (ACC), the Big Ten Conference, or the Southeastern Conference (SEC). Selected to the bowl were South Carolina of the SEC and Notre Dame, who compete as an FBS Independent.

This was the fifth meeting between Notre Dame and South Carolina; the Fighting Irish lead the all-time series, 3–1.

=== Notre Dame ===
Notre Dame compiled an 8–4 record during their regular season. They opened their season with two losses, then won eight of their next nine games, before closing with a loss at USC. The Fighting Irish faced five ranked opponents, defeating BYU, Syracuse, and Clemson while losing to Ohio State and USC. Notre Dame entered the bowl 21st in the College Football Playoff (CFP) ranking.

=== South Carolina ===
South Carolina went 8–4 during the regular season, 4–4 in conference play. They also faced five ranked opponents, defeating Kentucky, Tennessee, and Clemson while losing to Arkansas and Georgia. The Gamecocks entered the bowl 19th in the CFP ranking.

== Game summary ==
2022 TaxSlayer Gator Bowl

| Quarter | 1 | 2 | 3 | 4 | Total |
|---|---|---|---|---|---|
| No. 21 Notre Dame | 7 | 10 | 14 | 14 | 45 |
| No. 19 South Carolina | 21 | 3 | 7 | 7 | 38 |

at TIAA Bank Field • Jacksonville, Florida

- Date: Friday, December 30, 2022
- Game time: 3:30 p.m. EST
- Game weather: Sunny • Temperature: 75 °F (24 °C) • Wind: 20 mph (32 km/h) south
- Game attendance: 67,383
- Referee: Mike Cannon
- TV announcers (ESPN): Taylor Zarzour (play-by-play), Matt Stinchcomb (analyst), and Alyssa Lang (sideline)
- Box score

Scoring summary

| Quarter | Time | Drive | | | Team | Scoring information | Score | |
| Quarter | Time | Plays | Yards | TOP | Team | Scoring information | Notre Dame | South Carolina |
|---|---|---|---|---|---|---|---|---|
| "TOP" = time of possession. For other American football terms, see Glossary of American football. | | | | | | | | |

== Statistics ==
Team statistical comparison
| Statistic | Notre Dame | South Carolina |
|---|---|---|
| First downs | 27 | 20 |
| First downs rushing | 14 | 5 |
| First downs passing | 13 | 13 |
| First downs penalty | 0 | 2 |
| Third down efficiency | 11–19 | 5–15 |
| Fourth down efficiency | 1–1 | 1–2 |
| Total plays–net yards | 80–558 | 72–352 |
| Rushing attempts–net yards | 46–264 | 22–65 |
| Yards per rush | 5.7 | 3.0 |
| Yards passing | 294 | 287 |
| Pass completions–attempts | 19–34 | 31–50 |
| Interceptions thrown | 3 | 1 |
| Punt returns–total yards | 1–7 | 2–7 |
| Kickoff returns–total yards | 1–18 | 2–64 |
| Punts–average yardage | 4–50.0 | 6–40.0 |
| Fumbles–lost | 0–0 | 1–1 |
| Penalties–yards | 4–40 | 8–68 |
| Time of possession | 36:39 | 23:21 |

Notre Dame statistics
Fighting Irish passing
| | C–A | Yds | TD–INT |
|---|---|---|---|
| Tyler Buchner | 18–33 | 274 | 3–3 |
| Davis Sherwood | 1–1 | 20 | 0–0 |
Fighting Irish rushing
| | Car | Yds | TD |
| Audric Estimé | 14 | 95 | 0 |
| Logan Diggs | 13 | 89 | 1 |
| Tyler Buchner | 12 | 61 | 2 |
| Chris Tyree | 5 | 21 | 0 |
| TEAM | 2 | −2 | 0 |
Fighting Irish receiving
| | Rec | Yds | TD |
| Braden Lenzy | 4 | 89 | 1 |
| Logan Diggs | 2 | 81 | 1 |
| Jayden Thomas | 5 | 67 | 0 |
| Mitchell Evans | 3 | 39 | 1 |
| Chris Tyree | 4 | 10 | 0 |
| Audric Estimé | 1 | 8 | 0 |

South Carolina statistics
Gamecocks passing
| | C–A | Yds | TD–INT |
|---|---|---|---|
| Spencer Rattler | 29–46 | 246 | 2–1 |
| Kai Kroeger | 1–1 | 23 | 1–0 |
| Dakereon Joyner | 1–1 | 18 | 0–0 |
Gamecocks rushing
| | Car | Yds | TD |
| Juju McDowell | 6 | 28 | 0 |
| Spencer Rattler | 7 | 27 | 0 |
| Dakereon Joyner | 1 | 8 | 0 |
| Christian Beal-Smith | 3 | 8 | 0 |
| Ahmarean Brown | 1 | 2 | 0 |
| Rashad Amos | 1 | −2 | 0 |
| Antwane Wells Jr. | 1 | −2 | 0 |
| Xavier Legette | 2 | −4 | 0 |
Gamecocks receiving
| | Rec | Yds | TD |
| Xavier Legette | 7 | 78 | 2 |
| Nate Adkins | 5 | 78 | 0 |
| Dakereon Joyner | 3 | 35 | 0 |
| Antwane Wells Jr. | 5 | 30 | 0 |
| Hunter Rogers | 1 | 23 | 1 |
| Ahmarean Brown | 4 | 22 | 0 |
| Juju McDowell | 3 | 13 | 0 |
| Christian Beal-Smith | 2 | 7 | 0 |
| O'Mega Blake | 1 | 1 | 0 |
