= 2022 Notre Dame Fighting Irish football team =

American college football season

2022 Notre Dame Fighting Irish football

Gator Bowl champion

Gator Bowl, W 45–38 vs. South Carolina
- Conference: Independent

Ranking
- Coaches: No. 18
- AP: No. 18
- Record: 9–4
- Head coach: Marcus Freeman (1st season)
- Offensive coordinator: Tommy Rees (3rd season)
- Offensive scheme: Multiple
- Defensive coordinator: Al Golden (1st season)
- Base defense: 4–3
- MVP: Michael Mayer
- Captains: Bo Bauer; JD Bertrand; Avery Davis; Isaiah Foskey; Michael Mayer; Jarrett Patterson
- Home stadium: Notre Dame Stadium

Uniform
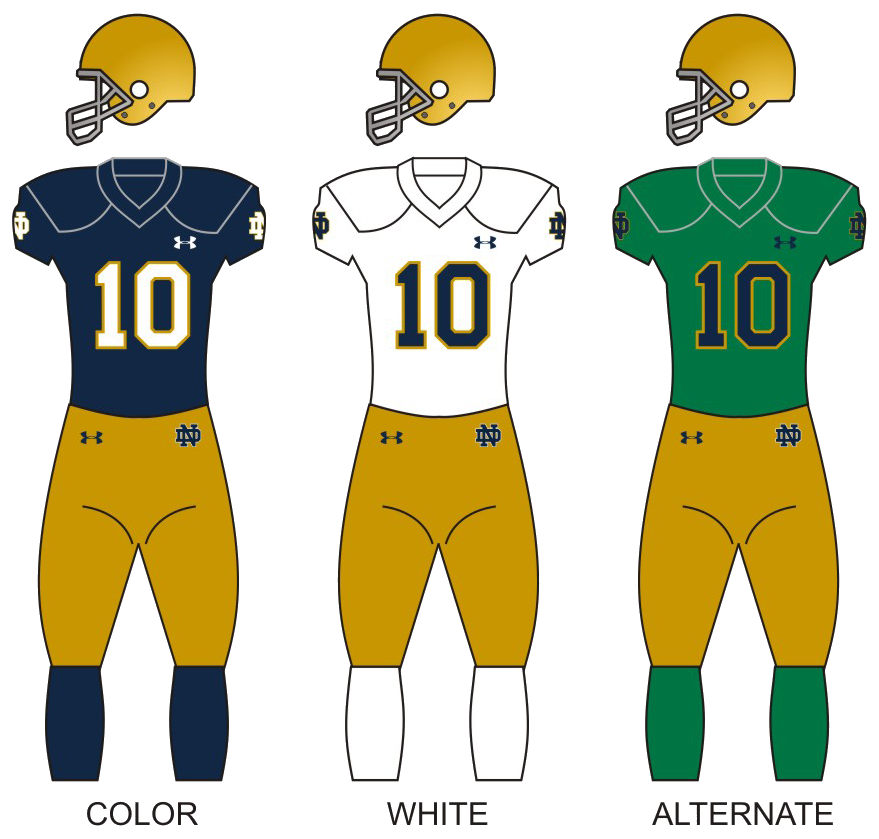

2022 NCAA Division I FBS independents football records
	Conf.			Overall
Team	W		L	W		L
No. 18 Notre Dame		–		9	–	4
Liberty		–		8	–	5
BYU		–		8	–	5
New Mexico State		–		7	–	6
Army		–		6	–	6
UConn		–		6	–	7
UMass		–		1	–	11
Rankings from AP Poll

The 2022 Notre Dame Fighting Irish football team was an American football team that represented the University of Notre Dame as an independent during the 2022 NCAA Division I FBS football season. In their first season under head coach Marcus Freeman, the Irish compiled a 9–4 record, outscored opponents by a total of 413 to 299, and were ranked No. 18 in both the final AP and Coaches Polls. After losing the first two games, they won nine of their next eleven games, including a 35–14 win over No. 4 Clemson. They concluded the season with a victory over No. 20 South Carolina in the Gator Bowl.

The team's statistical leaders included quarterback Drew Pyne (2,021 passing yards), running back Audric Estimé (920 rushing yards), tight end Michael Mayer (67 receptions for 809 yards), kicker Blake Grupe (91 points scored), and linebacker JD Bertrand (82 total tackles). Mayer and defensive end Isaiah Foskey were consensus first-team picks on the 2022 All-America college football team. Offensive tackle Joe Alt also received first-team All-America honors from multiple selectors.

The team played its home games at Notre Dame Stadium in Notre Dame, Indiana.

== Offseason ==
=== Coaching changes ===
On December 2, 2021, following the departure of Brian Kelly to LSU, defensive coordinator Marcus Freeman was promoted to head coach.

The following coaches left the football program:

- WR coach Del Alexander left for a position at Georgia Tech
- OL coach Jeff Quinn was not retained.
- ST coach Brian Polian left for a position at LSU.
- DL coach & recruiting coordinator Mike Elston left for a position at Michigan.
- RB coach & run game coordinator Lance Taylor left for the offensive coordinator position at Louisville.
- TE coach John McNulty left for the offensive coordinator position at Boston College.

New coaches announced in a press conference on February 17, 2022

- Harry Hiestand, rehired to coach offensive line
- Gerad Parker, hired to coach tight ends
- Al Washington, hired to coach defensive line
- Al Golden, hired to coach linebackers and as defensive coordinator
- Chansi Stuckey, hired to coach wide receivers
- Brian Mason, hired to coach special teams
- Deland McCullough, hired to coach running backs

=== Transfers in ===
- DL Chris Smith transferred in from Harvard.
- S Brandon Joseph transferred in from Northwestern.
- K Blake Grupe transferred in from Arkansas State.
- P Jon Sot transferred in from Harvard.

=== Departures ===
NFL

- S Kyle Hamilton (drafted by the Baltimore Ravens)
- RB Kyren Williams (drafted by the Los Angeles Rams)
- WR Kevin Austin Jr. (signed with the Jacksonville Jaguars)
- QB Jack Coan (signed with the Indianapolis Colts)
- DL Kurt Hinish (signed with the Houston Texans)
- LB Isaiah Pryor (signed with the New Orleans Saints)
- DL Myron Tagovailoa-Amosa (signed with the Las Vegas Raiders)
- LB Drew White (signed with the Washington Commanders)
- K Jonathan Doerer (invited to New York Giants minicamp)
- OL Cain Madden (invited to New York Giants minicamp)

Transfers out

- QB Brendon Clark transferred to Old Dominion
- RB C'Bo Flemister transferred to Pittsburgh
- WR Lawrence Keys III transferred to Tulane
- TE George Takacs transferred to Boston College
- OL Quinn Carroll transferred to Minnesota
- LB Shayne Simon transferred to Pittsburgh
- LB Paul Moala transferred to Idaho
- CB JoJo Johnson transferred to Iowa Western Community College
- CB Caleb Offord transferred to Buffalo
- S K. J. Wallace transferred to Georgia Tech
- S Litchfield Ajavon transferred to Rice
- S Khari Gee transferred to Georgia Tech
- K Harrison Leonard transferred to Rhode Island
- P Jay Bramblett transferred to LSU

Other

- DL Kahanu Kia (Mormon missionary)
- OL John Dirksen (retired from football)

== Schedule ==
Notre Dame announced and finalized the 2022 football schedule on December 7, 2021.

Date	Time	Opponent	Rank	Site	TV	Result	Attendance
September 3	7:30 p.m.	at No. 2 Ohio State	No. 5	Ohio Stadium; Columbus, OH (College GameDay)	ABC	L 10–21	106,594
September 10	2:30 p.m.	Marshall	No. 8	Notre Dame Stadium; Notre Dame, IN	NBC	L 21–26	77,622
September 17	2:30 p.m.	California		Notre Dame Stadium; Notre Dame, IN	NBC	W 24–17	77,622
September 24	3:30 p.m.	at North Carolina		Kenan Memorial Stadium; Chapel Hill, NC (rivalry)	ABC	W 45–32	50,500
October 8	7:30 p.m.	vs. No. 16 BYU		Allegiant Stadium; Paradise, NV (Shamrock Series)	NBC	W 28–20	62,742
October 15	7:30 p.m.	Stanford		Notre Dame Stadium; Notre Dame, IN (rivalry)	NBC	L 14–16	77,622
October 22	2:30 p.m.	UNLV		Notre Dame Stadium; Notre Dame, IN	Peacock	W 44–21	73,165
October 29	12:00 p.m.	at No. 16 Syracuse		JMA Wireless Dome; Syracuse, NY	ABC	W 41–24	49,861
November 5	7:30 p.m.	No. 4 Clemson		Notre Dame Stadium; Notre Dame, IN	NBC	W 35–14	77,622
November 12	12:00 p.m.	vs. Navy	No. 20	M&T Bank Stadium; Baltimore, MD (rivalry)	ABC	W 35–32	62,124
November 19	2:30 p.m.	Boston College	No. 18	Notre Dame Stadium; Notre Dame, IN (Holy War)	NBC	W 44–0	73,503
November 26	7:30 p.m.	at No. 6 USC	No. 15	Los Angeles Memorial Coliseum; Los Angeles, CA (rivalry)	ABC	L 27–38	72,613
December 30	3:30 p.m.	vs. No. 19 South Carolina	No. 21	TIAA Bank Field; Jacksonville, FL (Gator Bowl)	ESPN	W 45–38	67,383
Rankings from AP Poll (and CFP Rankings, after November 2) – Released prior to game; All times are in Eastern time

== Personnel ==
=== Roster ===
2022 Notre Dame Fighting Irish football team roster
Players
Coaches
Offense

Pos.	#	Name	Class
WR	0	Braden Lenzy	RSr
WR	3	Avery Davis (C)	RSr
RB	3	Logan Diggs	So
WR	4	Lorenzo Styles Jr.	So
WR	5	Joe Wilkins Jr.	RSr
RB	7	Audric Estimé	So
TE	9	Eli Raridon	Fr
QB	10	Drew Pyne	RSo
QB	11	Ron Powlus III	RFr
QB	12	Tyler Buchner	So
RB	13	Gi'Bran Payne	Fr
WR	15	Tobias Merriweather	Fr
WR	16	Deion Colzie	So
QB	18	Steve Angeli	Fr
RB	20	Jadarian Price	Fr
TE	23	Justin Fisher (W)	Fr
RB	25	Chris Tyree	Jr
WR	26	Chase Dixon (W)	Jr
RB	27	Chase Ketterer (W)	Jr
WR	28	Griffin Eifert (W)	Jr
WR	29	Matt Salerno	RSr
RB	30	Skip Velotta (W)	Sr
RB	33	Sam Assaf (W)	Sr
TE	35	Hakim Sanfo (W)	Jr
WR	37	Henry Cook (W)	Jr
TE	38	Davis Sherwood (W)	So
TE	39	Andrew Yanoshak (W)	So
TE	40	Barret Liebentritt (W)	So
WR	43	Greg Mailey (W)	RSr
OL	50	Rocco Spindler	RFr
OL	52	Zeke Correll	RJr
OL	53	Quinn Murphy (W)	Sr
OL	54	Blake Fisher	RFr
OL	55	Jarrett Patterson (C)	RSr
OL	59	Aamil Wagner	Fr
OL	68	Michael Carmody	RSo
OL	70	Ashton Craig	Fr
OL	71	Brennan Wicks (W)	Jr
OL	72	Caleb Johnson	RFr
OL	73	Andrew Kristofic	RJr
OL	74	Billy Schrauth	Fr
OL	75	Josh Lugg	RSr
OL	76	Joe Alt	So
OL	77	Ty Chan	Fr
OL	78	Pat Coogan	RFr
OL	79	Tosh Baker	RSo
WR	80	Jack Polian (W)	So
TE	81	Cane Berrong	RFr
WR	82	Leo Scheidler (W)	Fr
WR	83	Jayden Thomas	RFr
TE	84	Kevin Bauman	RSo
TE	85	Holden Staes	Fr
WR	86	Conor Ratigan (W)	Sr
TE	87	Michael Mayer (C)	Jr
TE	88	Mitchell Evans	So
TE	89	Charlie Selna (W)	Jr

Defense

Pos.	#	Name	Class
S	2	DJ Brown	RSr
S	3	Houston Griffith	RSr
CB	5	Cam Hart	RJr
CB	6	Clarence Lewis	Jr
DL	7	Isaiah Foskey (C)	RJr
LB	8	Marist Liufau	RJr
DL	9	Justin Ademilola	RSr
LB	10	Prince Kollie	So
S	11	Ramon Henderson	Jr
LB	12	Jordan Botelho	Jr
CB	15	Ryan Barnes	RFr
S	16	Brandon Joseph	RJr
LB	17	Jaylen Sneed	Fr
CB	18	Chance Tucker	RFr
S	19	Marty Auer (W)	So
CB	20	Benjamin Morrison	Fr
CB	21	Jaden Mickey	Fr
S	22	Justin Walters	RFr
CB	23	Jayden Bellamy	Fr
LB	24	Jack Kiser	RJr
CB	25	Philip Riley	RFr
S	26	Xavier Watts	RSo
LB	27	JD Bertrand (C)	RJr
CB	28	TaRiq Bracy	RSr
DL	31	NaNa Osafo-Mensah	RJr
LB	33	Tre Reader (W)	Fr
DL	34	Osita Ekwonu	RSr
S	36	Eddie Scheidler (W)	Sr
DL	40	Joshua Burnham	Fr
DL	41	Donovan Hinish	Fr
LB	42	Nolan Ziegler	Fr
LB	44	Junior Tuihalamaka	Fr
LB	46	Christian Opperman (W)	Sr
DL	47	Jason Onye	RFr
LB	48	Will Schweitzer	RFr
S	49	Mike Graves (W)	RSr
LB	52	Bo Bauer (C)	RSr
DL	54	Jacob Lacey	Sr
DL	56	Howard Cross III	RJr
DL	57	Jayson Ademilola	RSr
DL	65	Chris Smith	RSr
DL	90	Alexander Ehrensberger	RSo
DL	91	Aiden Gobaira	Fr
DL	92	Aidan Keanaaina	RSo
DL	97	Gabriel Rubio	RFr
DL	98	Tyson Ford	Fr
DL	99	Rylie Mills	Jr

Special teams

Pos.	#	Name	Class
P	14	Bryce McFerson	Fr
P	31	Bryan Dowd (W)	Jr
K	32	Chris Salerno (W)	So
P	39	Jon Sot (W)	RSr
LS	44	Alex Peitsch	RSo
LS	51	Rino Monteforte (W)	Fr
LS	65	Michael Vinson	RSr
K	91	Josh Bryan	RFr
K	92	Zac Yoakam (W)	Fr
K	99	Blake Grupe	RSr

Head coach

- Marcus Freeman

Coordinators/assistant coaches

- Tommy Rees – Offensive coordinator/quarterbacks
- Al Golden – Defensive coordinator/linebackers
- Brian Mason – Special teams coordinator
- Deland McCullough – Running backs
- Chansi Stuckey – Wide receivers
- Gerad Parker – Tight ends
- Harry Hiestand – Offensive line
- Al Washington – Defensive line/defensive run game coordinator
- Mike Mickens – Cornerbacks
- Chris O'Leary – Safeties
- Matt Balis – Director, football performance
- Ron Powlus – Associate Athletic Director
- Olivia Mitchell – Director, football operations

Legend

- (C) Team captain
- (S) Suspended
- (I) Ineligible
- (W) Walk-on
- Injured
- Redshirt

Roster
Last update: December 30, 2022

=== Depth chart ===
- Depth chart is a projection and is subject to change.

Defense

FS
DJ Brown
Houston Griffith
–

ROVER	MLB	WLB
Marist Liufau	JD Bertrand	Jack Kiser
Jack Kiser	Junior Tuihalamaka	JD Bertrand
Prince Kollie	–	–

SS
Brandon Joseph
Ramon Henderson
–

CB
Cam Hart
TaRiq Bracy
Jaden Mickey

DE	DT	DT	DE
Rylie Mills	Howard Cross III	Jayson Ademilola	Isaiah Foskey
NaNa Osafo-Mensah	Gabriel Rubio	Chris Smith	Justin Ademilola
Alexander Ehrensberger	–	–	Jordan Botelho

CB
Benjamin Morrison
Clarence Lewis
–

Offense

WR
Lorenzo Styles Jr.
Deion Colzie
–

WR
Jayden Thomas
Matt Salerno
–

LT	LG	C	RG	RT
Joe Alt	Jarrett Patterson	Zeke Correll	Josh Lugg	Blake Fisher
Tosh Baker	Andrew Kristofic	Pat Coogan	Rocco Spindler	Michael Carmody
–	–	–	–	–

TE
Michael Mayer
Mitchell Evans
Holden Staes

WR
Braden Lenzy
Tobias Merriweather
–

QB
Drew Pyne
Steve Angeli
–

Special teams
PK Blake Grupe
P Jon Sot
KR Chris Tyree
PR Matt Salerno
LS Michael Vinson
H Jon Sot

RB
Chris Tyree
Logan Diggs
Audric Estimé

== Game summaries ==
=== at No. 2 Ohio State ===
No. 5 Notre Dame Fighting Irish (0–0) at No. 2 Ohio State Buckeyes (0–0) – Game summary

Quarter	1	2	3	4	Total
No. 5 Fighting Irish	3	7	0	0	10
No. 2 Buckeyes	7	0	7	7	21

at Ohio Stadium • Columbus, OH

- Date: September 3, 2022
- Game time: 7:30 p.m.
- Game weather: Cloudy, 82 °F (28 °C)
- Game attendance: 106,594
- Referee: Jeff Heaser
- TV announcers (ABC): Chris Fowler (play-by-play), Kirk Herbstreit (analyst), Holly Rowe (sideline)

Game information

First Quarter

- (12:13) ND – Blake Grupe 33-yard field goal (Drive: 5 plays, 71 yards, 2:47; Notre Dame 3–0)
- (5:32) OSU – Emeka Egbuka 31-yard pass from C. J. Stroud, Noah Ruggles kick (Drive: 4 plays, 54 yards, 1:43; Ohio State 7–3)

Second Quarter

- (11:56) ND – Audric Estimé 1-yard run, Blake Grupe kick (Drive: 10 plays, 87 yards, 5:10; Notre Dame 10–7)

Third Quarter

- (0:17) OSU – Xavier Johnson 24-yard pass from C. J. Stroud, Noah Ruggles kick (Drive: 10 plays, 70 yards, 4:43; Ohio State 14–10)

Fourth Quarter

- (4:51) OSU – Miyan Williams 2-yard run, Noah Ruggles kick (Drive: 14 plays, 95 yards, 7:06; Ohio State 21–10)

Statistics	ND	OSU
First downs	12	22
Total yards	253	395
Rushes/yards	30–76	35–172
Passing yards	177	223
Passing: Comp–Att–Int	10–18–0	24–34–0
Time of possession	27:01	32:59

Team	Category	Player	Statistics
Notre Dame	Passing	Tyler Buchner	10/18, 177 yards
Notre Dame	Rushing	Chris Tyree	6 carries, 28 yards
Notre Dame	Receiving	Lorenzo Styles Jr.	1 reception, 54 yards
Ohio State	Passing	C. J. Stroud	24/34, 223 yards, 2 TD
Ohio State	Rushing	TreVeyon Henderson	15 carries, 91 yards
Ohio State	Receiving	Emeka Egbuka	9 receptions, 90 yards, TD

=== vs Marshall ===
Marshall Thundering Herd (1–0) vs No. 8 Notre Dame Fighting Irish (0–1) – Game summary

Quarter	1	2	3	4	Total
Thundering Herd	0	9	3	14	26
No. 8 Fighting Irish	0	7	0	14	21

at Notre Dame Stadium • South Bend, IN

- Date: September 10, 2022
- Game time: 2:30 p.m.
- Game weather: Sunny, 84 °F (29 °C)
- Game attendance: 77,622
- Referee: Timothy Hedgepeth
- TV announcers (NBC): Jac Collinsworth (play-by-play), Jason Garrett (analyst), Zora Stephenson (sideline)

Game information

First Quarter

None

Second Quarter

- (14:18) MRSH – Khalan Laborn 4-yard run, Rece Verhoff PAT missed (Drive: 10 plays, 79 yards, 3:56; Marshall 6–0)
- (3:00) ND – Tyler Buchner 1-yard run, Blake Grupe kick (Drive: 5 plays, 56 yards, 2:03; Notre Dame 7–6)
- (0:15) MRSH – Rece Verhoff 21-yard field goal (Drive: 12 plays, 74 yards, 2:45; Marshall 9–7)

Third Quarter

- (3:54) MRSH – Rece Verhoff 20-yard field goal (Drive: 9 plays, 46 yards, 4:10; Marshall 12–7)

Fourth Quarter

- (14:57) ND – Tyler Buchner 1-yard run, Tyler Buchner two-point run (Drive: 8 plays, 66 yards, 3:57; Notre Dame 15–12)
- (5:16) MRSH – Devin Miller 3-yard pass from Henry Colombi, Rece Verhoff kick (Drive: 11 plays, 94 yards, 5:16; Marshall 19–15)
- (4:35) MRSH – Steven Gilmore 37-yard interception return, Rece Verhoff kick (Marshall 26–15)
- (0:14) ND – Michael Mayer 5-yard pass from Drew Pyne, Drew Payne pass failed (Drive: 7 plays, 32 yards, 1:42; Marshall 26–21)

Statistics	MRSH	ND
First downs	21	22
Total yards	364	351
Rushes/yards	50–219	37–130
Passing yards	145	221
Passing: Comp–Att–Int	16–21–0	21–38–3
Time of possession	30:47	29:13

Team	Category	Player	Statistics
Marshall	Passing	Henry Colombi	16/21, 150 yards, TD
Marshall	Rushing	Khalan Laborn	31 carries, 161 yards, TD
Marshall	Receiving	Jayden Harrison	3 receptions, 38 yards
Notre Dame	Passing	Tyler Buchner	18/32, 201 yards, 2 INT
Notre Dame	Rushing	Tyler Buchner	13 carries, 44 yards, 2 TD
Notre Dame	Receiving	Michael Mayer	8 receptions, 103 yards, TD

=== vs California ===
California Golden Bears (2–0) vs Notre Dame Fighting Irish (0–2) – Game summary

Quarter	1	2	3	4	Total
Golden Bears	0	10	7	0	17
Fighting Irish	0	7	7	10	24

at Notre Dame Stadium • South Bend, IN

- Date: September 17, 2022
- Game time: 2:30 p.m.
- Game weather: Sunny, 83 °F (28 °C)
- Game attendance: 77,622
- Referee: Mike Roche
- TV announcers (NBC): Jac Collinsworth (play-by-play), Jason Garrett (analyst), Zora Stephenson (sideline)

Game information

First Quarter

None

Second Quarter

- (14:27) CAL – J. Michael Sturdivant 18-yard pass from Jack Plummer, Dario Longhetto kick (Drive: 4 plays, 33 yards, 0:26; California 7–0)
- (8:54) ND – Chris Tyree 21-yard pass from Drew Pyne, Blake Grupe kick (Drive: 10 plays, 60 yards, 5:28; Tied 7–7)
- (4:11) CAL – Dario Longhetto 34-yard field goal (Drive: 10 plays, 69 yards, 4:43; California 10–7)

Third Quarter

- (9:14) ND – Audric Estimé 1-yard run, Blake Grupe kick (Drive: 9 plays, 60 yards, 4:00; Notre Dame 14–10)
- (4:48) CAL – Jack Plummer 1-yard run, Dario Longhetto kick (Drive: 10 plays, 75 yards, 4:26; California 17–14)

Fourth Quarter

- (14:48) ND – Blake Grupe 47-yard field goal (Drive: 10 plays, 46 yards, 5:00; Tied 17–17)
- (9:16) ND – Michael Mayer 6-yard pass from Drew Pyne, Blake Grupe kick (Drive: 7 plays, 66 yards, 3:46; Notre Dame 24–17)

Statistics	CAL	ND
First downs	18	17
Total yards	296	297
Rushes/yards	31–112	41–147
Passing yards	184	150
Passing: Comp–Att–Int	16–37–0	17–23–0
Time of possession	26:58	33:02

Team	Category	Player	Statistics
California	Passing	Jack Plummer	16/37, 184 yards, TD
California	Rushing	DeCarlos Brooks	5 carries, 43 yards
California	Receiving	Jeremiah Hunter	5 receptions, 66 yards
Notre Dame	Passing	Drew Pyne	17/23, 150 yards, 2 TD
Notre Dame	Rushing	Audric Estimé	8 carries, 76 yards, TD
Notre Dame	Receiving	Chris Tyree	5 receptions, 44 yards, TD

=== at North Carolina ===
Notre Dame Fighting Irish (1–2) at North Carolina Tar Heels (3–0) – Game summary

Quarter	1	2	3	4	Total
Fighting Irish	0	24	14	7	45
Tar Heels	7	7	6	12	32

at Kenan Memorial Stadium • Chapel Hill, NC

- Date: September 24, 2022
- Game time: 3:30 p.m.
- Game weather: Cloudy • Temperature: 72 °F (22 °C) • Wind: SW 8 mph
- Game attendance: 50,500
- Referee: Jeff Flanagan
- TV announcers (ABC): Bob Wischusen (play–by–play), Dan Orlovsky (analyst), Kris Budden (sideline)

Game information

First Quarter

- (9:53) UNC – Josh Downs 4-yard pass from Drake Maye, Noah Burnette kick (Drive: 12 plays, 76 yards, 5:07; North Carolina 7–0)

Second Quarter

- (12:57) ND – Michael Mayer 10-yard pass from Drew Pyne, Blake Grupe kick (Drive: 8 plays, 83 yards, 3:48; Tied 7–7)
- (10:01) ND – Lorenzo Styles 30-yard pass from Drew Pyne, Blake Grupe kick (Drive: 3 plays, 66 yards, 1:26; Notre Dame 14–7)
- (6:55) UNC – Josh Downs 3-yard pass from Drake Maye, Noah Burnette kick (Drive: 9 plays, 76 yards, 3:06; Tied 14–14)
- (2:37) ND – Audric Estimé 1-yard run, Blake Grupe kick (Drive: 8 plays, 75 yards, 4:18; Notre Dame 21–14)
- (0:23) ND – Blake Grupe 40-yard field goal (Drive: 12 plays, 52 yards, 1:52; Notre Dame 24–14)

Third Quarter

- (12:18) ND – Logan Diggs 29-yard pass from Drew Pyne, Blake Grupe kick (Drive: 6 plays, 75 yards, 2:42; Notre Dame 31–14)
- (10:21) ND – Audric Estimé 1-yard run, Blake Grupe kick (Drive: 7 plays, 15 yards, 1:52; Notre Dame 38–14)
- (4:08) UNC – Antoine Green 80-yard pass from Drake Maye (Drive: 1 plays, 75 yards, 0:11; Notre Dame 38–20)

Fourth Quarter

- (13:04) ND – Chris Tyree 1-yard run, Blake Grupe kick (Drive: 12 plays, 75 yards, 6:04; Notre Dame 45–20)
- (9:47) UNC – Omarion Hampton 4-yard pass from Drake Maye (Drive: 9 plays, 76 yards, 3:17; Notre Dame 45–26)
- (1:44) UNC – Antoine Green 64-yard pass from Drake Maye (Drive: 7 plays, 80 yards, 1:36; Notre Dame 45–32)

Statistics	ND	UNC
First downs	35	18
Total yards	576	367
Rushes/yards	51–287	28–66
Passing yards	289	301
Passing: Comp–Att–Int	24–34–0	17–32–0
Time of possession	38:13	21:47

Team	Category	Player	Statistics
Notre Dame	Passing	Drew Pyne	24/34, 289 yards, 3 TD
Notre Dame	Rushing	Audric Estimé	17 carries, 134 yards, 2 TD
Notre Dame	Receiving	Michael Mayer	7 receptions, 88 yards, TD
North Carolina	Passing	Drake Maye	17/32, 301 yards, 5 TD
North Carolina	Rushing	Drake Maye	13 carries, 36 yards
North Carolina	Receiving	Antoine Green	3 receptions, 150 yards, 2 TD

=== vs No. 16 BYU ===
No. 16 BYU Cougars (4–1) vs Notre Dame Fighting Irish (2–2) – Game summary

Quarter	1	2	3	4	Total
No. 16 Cougars	6	0	7	7	20
Fighting Irish	3	15	7	3	28

at Allegiant Stadium • Las Vegas, NV

- Date: October 8, 2022
- Game time: 4:30 p.m. PST
- Game weather: Indoor, 72 °F (22 °C)
- Game attendance: 62,742
- Referee: Stuart Mullins
- TV announcers (NBC): Jac Collinsworth (play–by–play), Jason Garrett (analyst), Zora Stephenson (sideline)

Game information

First Quarter

- (11:25) ND – Blake Grupe 26-yard field goal (Drive: 8 plays, 36 yards, 3:26; Notre Dame 3–0)
- (4:32) BYU – Kody Epps 2-yard pass from Jaren Hall (Drive: 7 plays, 26 yards, 3:49; BYU 6–3)

Second Quarter

- (14:19) ND – Michael Mayer 24-yard pass from Drew Pyne, Blake Grupe kick (Drive: 10 plays, 75 yards, 5:13; Notre Dame 10–6)
- (6:50) ND – Team safety (Drive: 1 plays, −4 yards, 0:07; Notre Dame 12–6)
- (1:03) ND – Jayden Thomas 30-yard pass from Drew Pyne (Drive: 10 plays, 79 yards, 5:42; Notre Dame 18–6)

Third Quarter

- (8:05) ND – Michael Mayer 19-yard pass from Drew Pyne, Blake Grupe kick (Drive: 11 plays, 75 yards, 6:55; Notre Dame 25–6)
- (5:27) BYU – Kody Epps 53-yard pass from Jaren Hall, Justen Smith kick (Drive: 5 plays, 75 yards, 2:38; Notre Dame 25–13)

Fourth Quarter

- (14:18) BYU – Christopher Brooks 28-yard run, Justen Smith kick (Drive: 10 plays, 87 yards, 4:41; Notre Dame 25–20)
- (6:07) ND – Blake Grupe 20-yard field goal (Drive: 8 plays, 62 yards, 4:47; Notre Dame 28–20)

Statistics	BYU	ND
First downs	13	24
Total yards	280	496
Rushes/yards	29–160	45–234
Passing yards	120	262
Passing: Comp–Att–Int	9–17–1	22–28–1
Time of possession	19:05	40:55

Team	Category	Player	Statistics
BYU	Passing	Jaren Hall	9/17, 120 yards, 2 TD, INT
BYU	Rushing	Christopher Brooks	14 carries, 90 yards, TD
BYU	Receiving	Kody Epps	4 receptions, 100 yards, 2 TD
Notre Dame	Passing	Drew Pyne	22/28, 262 yards, 3 TD, INT
Notre Dame	Rushing	Audric Estimé	14 carries, 97 yards
Notre Dame	Receiving	Michael Mayer	11 receptions, 118 yards, 2 TD

=== vs Stanford ===
Stanford Cardinal (1–4) vs Notre Dame Fighting Irish (3–2) – Game summary

Quarter	1	2	3	4	Total
Cardinal	7	3	3	3	16
Fighting Irish	0	0	7	7	14

at Notre Dame Stadium • South Bend, IN

- Date: October 15, 2022
- Game time: 7:30 p.m.
- Game weather: Sunny, 50 °F (10 °C)
- Game attendance: 77,622
- Referee: Mike McCabe
- TV announcers (NBC): Jac Collinsworth (play–by–play), Jason Garrett (analyst), Zora Stephenson (sideline)

Game information

First Quarter

- (10:05) STAN – Casey Filkins 2-yard run, Joshua Karty kick (Drive: 8 plays, 66 yards, 3:28; Stanford 7–0)

Second Quarter

- (0:00) STAN – Joshua Karty 45-yard field goal (Drive: 6 plays, 18 yards, 0:42; Stanford 10–0)

Third Quarter

- (8:44) STAN – Joshua Karty 43-yard field goal (Drive: 9 plays, 48 yards, 3:00; Stanford 13–0)
- (6:22) ND – Audric Estimé 10-yard run, Blake Grupe kick (Drive: 6 plays, 75 yards, 2:22; Stanford 13–7)

Fourth Quarter

- (14:53) ND – Tobias Merriweather 41-yard pass from Drew Pyne, Blake Grupe kick (Drive: 6 plays, 60 yards, 2:40; Notre Dame 14–13)
- (10:20) STAN – Joshua Karty 43-yard field goal (Drive: 10 plays, 51 yards, 4:33; Stanford 16–14)

Statistics	STAN	ND
First downs	21	16
Total yards	385	301
Rushes/yards	42–97	34–150
Passing yards	288	151
Passing: Comp–Att–Int	26–39–0	13–27–0
Time of possession	36:07	23:53

Team	Category	Player	Statistics
Stanford	Passing	Tanner McKee	26/38, 288 yards
Stanford	Rushing	Casey Filkins	32 carries, 91 yards, TD
Stanford	Receiving	Elijah Higgins	5 receptions, 81 yards
Notre Dame	Passing	Drew Pyne	13/27, 151 yards, TD
Notre Dame	Rushing	Audric Estimé	8 carries, 57 yards, TD
Notre Dame	Receiving	Michael Mayer	5 receptions, 60 yards

=== vs UNLV ===
UNLV Rebels (4–3) vs Notre Dame Fighting Irish (3–3) – Game summary

Quarter	1	2	3	4	Total
Rebels	7	0	7	7	21
Fighting Irish	23	7	0	14	44

at Notre Dame Stadium • South Bend, IN

- Date: October 22, 2022
- Game time: 2:30 p.m.
- Game weather: Sunny, 72 °F (22 °C)
- Game attendance: 73,165
- Referee: Jerry Magallanes
- TV announcers (Peacock): Jac Collinsworth (play–by–play), Jason Garrett (analyst), Zora Stephenson (sideline)

Game information

First Quarter

- (12:35) ND – Audric Estimé 12-yard run, Blake Grupe kick (Drive: 6 plays, 75 yards, 2:25; Notre Dame 7–0)
- (10:06) ND – Blake Grupe 43-yard field goal (Drive: 5 plays, 18 yards, 2:07; Notre Dame 10–0)
- (9:10) UNLV – Jordan Younge-Humphrey 2-yard run, Daniel Gutierrez kick (Drive: 3 plays, 75 yards, 0:56; Notre Dame 10–7)
- (6:24) ND – Michael Mayer 20-yard pass from Drew Pyne, Blake Grupe kick (Drive: 2 plays, 20 yards, 0:08; Notre Dame 17–7)
- (3:58) ND – Blake Grupe 27-yard field goal (Drive: 4 plays, 5 yards, 0:48; Notre Dame 20–7)
- (1:18) ND – Blake Grupe 46-yard field goal (Drive: 4 plays, 4 yards, 1:12; Notre Dame 23–7)

Second Quarter

- (4:10) ND – Mitchell Evans 1-yard run, Blake Grupe kick (Drive: 6 plays, 46 yards, 3:04; Notre Dame 30–7)

Third Quarter

- (8:06) UNLV – Harrison Bailey 2-yard run, Daniel Gutierrez kick (Drive: 9 plays, 76 yards, 3:43; Notre Dame 30–14)

Fourth Quarter

- (11:59) ND – Chris Tyree 8-yard run, Blake Grupe kick (Drive: 13 plays, 62 yards, 7:10; Notre Dame 37–14)
- (8:02) UNLV – Jordan Younge-Humphrey 1-yard run, Daniel Gutierrez kick (Drive: 11 plays, 75 yards, 3:57; Notre Dame 37–21)
- (2:55) ND – Braden Lenzy 4-yard pass from Drew Pyne, Blake Grupe kick (Drive: 9 plays, 46 yards, 5:06; Notre Dame 44–21)

Statistics	UNLV	ND
First downs	11	23
Total yards	299	428
Rushes/yards	28–146	47–223
Passing yards	153	205
Passing: Comp–Att–Int	17–33–0	14–28–1
Time of possession	26:02	33:58

Team	Category	Player	Statistics
UNLV	Passing	Cameron Friel	8/15, 80 yards
UNLV	Rushing	Courtney Reese	11 carries, 142 yards
UNLV	Receiving	Nick Williams	4 receptions, 47 yards
Notre Dame	Passing	Drew Pyne	14/28, 205 yards, 2 TD, INT
Notre Dame	Rushing	Logan Diggs	28 carries, 130 yards
Notre Dame	Receiving	Michael Mayer	6 receptions, 115 yards, TD

=== at No. 16 Syracuse ===
Notre Dame Fighting Irish (4–3) at No. 16 Syracuse Orange (6–1) – Game summary

Quarter	1	2	3	4	Total
Fighting Irish	7	14	3	17	41
No. 16 Orange	7	0	10	7	24

at JMA Wireless Dome • Syracuse, NY

- Date: October 29, 2022
- Game time: 12:00 p.m.
- Game weather: Indoor, 65 °F (18 °C)
- Game attendance: 49,861
- Referee: Gary Patterson
- TV announcers (ABC): Joe Tessitore (play–by–play), Greg McElroy (analyst), Katie George (sideline)

Game information

First Quarter

- (14:53) ND – Brandon Joseph 29-yard interception return, Blake Grupe kick (Drive: 1 plays, 0 yards, 0:07; Notre Dame 7–0)
- (11:11) CUSE – Oronde Gadsden II 13-yard pass from Garrett Shrader, Andre Szmyt kick (Drive: 7 plays, 53 yards, 3:42; Tied 7–7)

Second Quarter

- (8:23) ND – Logan Diggs 3-yard run, Blake Grupe kick (Drive: 11 plays, 55 yards, 6:25; Notre Dame 14–7)
- (0:17) ND – Jayden Thomas 3-yard pass from Drew Pyne, Blake Grupe kick (Drive: 6 plays, 61 yards, 1:01; Notre Dame 21–7)

Third Quarter

- (7:41) ND – Blake Grupe 31-yard field goal (Drive: 6 plays, 22 yards, 2:54; Notre Dame 24–7)
- (4:57) CUSE – Andre Szmyt 54-yard field goal (Drive: 7 plays, 39 yards, 2:44; Notre Dame 24–10)
- (0:25) CUSE – Sean Tucker 4-yard run, Andre Szmyt kick (Drive: 6 plays, 67 yards, 2:21; Notre Dame 24–17)

Fourth Quarter

- (9:11) ND – Audric Estimé 11-yard run, Blake Grupe kick (Drive: 7 plays, 54 yards, 3:40; Notre Dame 31–17)
- (7:47) ND – Audric Estimé 2-yard run, Blake Grupe kick (Drive: 1 plays, 2 yards, 0:03; Notre Dame 38–17)
- (5:44) CUSE – D'Marcus Adams 13-yard pass from Carlos Del Rio-Wilson, Andre Szmyt kick (Drive: 8 plays, 75 yards, 2:03; Notre Dame 38–24)
- (1:58) ND – Blake Grupe 20-yard field goal (Drive: 8 plays, 45 yards, 3:46; Notre Dame 41–24)

Statistics	ND	CUSE
First downs	22	15
Total yards	362	286
Rushes/yards	56–246	25–61
Passing yards	116	225
Passing: Comp–Att–Int	9–19–1	16–36–2
Time of possession	37:40	22:20

Team	Category	Player	Statistics
Notre Dame	Passing	Drew Pyne	9/19, 116 yards, TD, INT
Notre Dame	Rushing	Audric Estimé	20 carries, 123 yards, 2 TD
Notre Dame	Receiving	Michael Mayer	3 receptions, 54 yards
Syracuse	Passing	Carlos Del Rio-Wilson	11/22, 190 yards, TD, INT
Syracuse	Rushing	Sean Tucker	16 carries, 60 yards, TD
Syracuse	Receiving	Oronde Gadsden II	4 receptions, 78 yards, TD

=== vs No. 4 Clemson ===
No. 4 Clemson Tigers (8–0) vs Notre Dame Fighting Irish (5–3) – Game summary

Quarter	1	2	3	4	Total
No. 4 Tigers	0	0	0	14	14
Fighting Irish	7	7	0	21	35

at Notre Dame Stadium • South Bend, IN

- Date: November 5, 2022
- Game time: 7:30 p.m.
- Game weather: Clear, 55 °F (13 °C)
- Game attendance: 77,622
- Referee: Adam Savoie
- TV announcers (NBC): Jac Collinsworth (play–by–play), Jason Garrett (analyst), Zora Stephenson (sideline)

Game information

First Quarter

- (9:08) ND – Prince Kollie 17-yard blocked punt return, Blake Grupe kick (Drive: 4 plays, −4 yards, 2:37; Notre Dame 7–0)

Second Quarter

- (0:38) ND – Drew Pyne 5-yard run, Blake Grupe kick (Drive: 11 plays, 78 yards, 5:47; Notre Dame 14–0)

Third Quarter

None

Fourth Quarter

- (14:37) ND – Audric Estimé 2-yard run, Blake Grupe kick (Drive: 3 plays, 14 yards, 1:05; Notre Dame 21–0)
- (12:58) ND – Benjamin Morrison 96-yard interception return, Blake Grupe kick (Drive: 5 plays, 56 yards, 1:39; Notre Dame 28–0)
- (10:14) CLEM – Will Shipley 1-yard run, B. T. Potter kick (Drive: 11 plays, 75 yards, 2:44; Notre Dame 28–7)
- (4:16) ND – Michael Mayer 17-yard pass from Drew Pyne, Blake Grupe kick (Drive: 11 plays, 75 yards, 5:58; Notre Dame 35–7)
- (1:35) CLEM – Joseph Ngata 4-yard pass from D. J. Uiagalelei, B. T. Potter kick (Drive: 10 plays, 75 yards, 2:41; Notre Dame 35–14)

Statistics	CLEM	ND
First downs	21	24
Total yards	281	348
Rushes/yards	25–90	47–263
Passing yards	191	85
Passing: Comp–Att–Int	27–40–0	9–17–0
Time of possession	27:00	33:00

Team	Category	Player	Statistics
Clemson	Passing	DJ Uiagalelei	27/39, 191 yards, TD, INT
Clemson	Rushing	Will Shipley	12 carries, 63 yards, TD
Clemson	Receiving	Davis Allen	7 receptions, 60 yards
Notre Dame	Passing	Drew Pyne	9/17, 85 yards, TD
Notre Dame	Rushing	Logan Diggs	17 carries, 114 yards
Notre Dame	Receiving	Michael Mayer	4 receptions, 44 yards, TD

=== vs Navy ===
No. 20 Notre Dame Fighting Irish (6–3) at Navy Midshipmen (3–6) – Game summary

Quarter	1	2	3	4	Total
No. 20 Fighting Irish	14	21	0	0	35
Midshipmen	6	7	3	16	32

at M&T Bank Stadium • Baltimore, MD

- Date: November 12, 2022
- Game time: 12:00 p.m.
- Game weather: Sunny, 70 °F (21 °C)
- Game attendance: 62,124
- Referee: Riley Johnson
- TV announcers (ABC): Dave Flemming (play–by–play), Dan Orlovsky (analyst), Kris Budden (sideline)

Game information

First Quarter

- (10:36) ND – Audric Estimé 30-yard pass from Drew Pyne, Blake Grupe kick (Drive: 9 plays, 67 yards, 4:24; Notre Dame 7–0)
- (4:28) ND – Braden Lenzy 38-yard pass from Drew Pyne, Blake Grupe kick (Drive: 6 plays, 82 yards, 2:42; Notre Dame 14–0)
- (2:19) NAVY – Daba Fofana 36-yard run (Drive: 5 plays, 75 yards, 2:09; Notre Dame 14–6)

Second Quarter

- (12:27) ND – Chris Tyree 5-yard pass from Drew Pyne, Blake Grupe kick (Drive: 10 plays, 83 yards, 4:52; Notre Dame 21–6)
- (7:49) NAVY – Xavier Arline 2-yard run, Bijan Nichols kick (Drive: 7 plays, 80 yards, 4:38; Notre Dame 21–13)
- (2:19) ND – Drew Pyne 11-yard run, Blake Grupe kick (Drive: 3 plays, 41 yards, 1:18; Notre Dame 28–13)
- (1:10) ND – Jayden Thomas 37-yard pass from Drew Pyne, Blake Grupe kick (Drive: 1 plays, 37 yards, 0:07; Notre Dame 35–13)

Third Quarter

- (4:59) NAVY – Bijan Nichols 26-yard field goal (Drive: 16 plays, 72 yards, 10:01; Notre Dame 35–16)

Fourth Quarter

- (14:47) NAVY – Mark Walker 23-yard pass from Xavier Arline, Xavier Arline two-point run (Drive: 1 plays, 23 yards, 0:06; Notre Dame 35–24)
- (1:21) NAVY – Maquel Haywood 20-yard pass from Maasai Maynor, Vincent Terrell Jr. two-point run (Drive: 11 plays, 88 yards, 2:57; Notre Dame 35–32)

Statistics	ND	NAVY
First downs	15	19
Total yards	335	363
Rushes/yards	34–66	46–255
Passing yards	269	108
Passing: Comp–Att–Int	17–21–1	6–13–1
Time of possession	29:21	30:39

Team	Category	Player	Statistics
Notre Dame	Passing	Drew Pyne	17/21, 269 yards, 4 TD, INT
Notre Dame	Rushing	Audric Estimé	8 carries, 49 yards
Notre Dame	Receiving	Jayden Thomas	3 receptions, 80 yards, TD
Navy	Passing	Xavier Arline	2/4, 57 yards, TD
Navy	Rushing	Daba Fofana	15 carries, 133 yards, TD
Navy	Receiving	Mark Walker	3 receptions, 67 yards, TD

=== vs Boston College ===
Boston College Eagles (3–7) vs No. 18 Notre Dame Fighting Irish (7–3) – Game summary

Quarter	1	2	3	4	Total
Eagles	0	0	0	0	0
No. 18 Fighting Irish	17	20	7	0	44

at Notre Dame Stadium • South Bend, IN

- Date: November 19, 2022
- Game time: 2:30 p.m.
- Game weather: Snowy, 25 °F (−4 °C)
- Game attendance: 73,503
- Referee: Jeff Heaser
- TV announcers (NBC): Jac Collinsworth (play–by–play), Jason Garrett (analyst), Zora Stephenson (sideline)

Game information

First Quarter

- (12:50) ND – Blake Grupe 26-yard field goal (Drive: 6 plays, 67 yards, 2:10; Notre Dame 3–0)
- (10:05) ND – Logan Diggs 1-yard run, Blake Grupe kick (Drive: 5 plays, 20 yards, 2:22; Notre Dame 10–0)
- (4:15) ND – Matt Salerno 1-yard pass from Drew Pyne, Blake Grupe kick (Drive: 8 plays, 81 yards, 4:26; Notre Dame 17–0)

Second Quarter

- (14:07) ND – Blake Grupe 41-yard field goal (Drive: 10 plays, 57 yards, 3:37; Notre Dame 20–0)
- (8:27) ND – Blake Grupe 46-yard field goal (Drive: 7 plays, 15 yards, 3:22; Notre Dame 23–0)
- (3:04) ND – Audric Estimé 7-yard run, Blake Grupe kick (Drive: 4 plays, 42 yards, 2:04; Notre Dame 30–0)
- (1:14) ND – Chris Tyree 12-yard run, Blake Grupe kick (Drive: 4 plays, 49 yards, 0:56; Notre Dame 37–0)

Third Quarter

- (8:54) ND – Audric Estimé 6-yard run, Blake Grupe kick (Drive: 8 plays, 47 yards, 4:29; Notre Dame 44–0)

Fourth Quarter

None

Statistics	BC	ND
First downs	10	22
Total yards	173	437
Rushes/yards	36–56	38–281
Passing yards	117	156
Passing: Comp–Att–Int	9–22–3	13–25–0
Time of possession	29:00	31:00

Team	Category	Player	Statistics
Boston College	Passing	Emmett Morehead	9/22, 117 yards, 3 INT
Boston College	Rushing	Alex Broome	7 carries, 25 yards
Boston College	Receiving	Zay Flowers	3 receptions, 46 yards
Notre Dame	Passing	Drew Pyne	13/25, 156 yards, TD
Notre Dame	Rushing	Logan Diggs	15 carries, 122 yards, TD
Notre Dame	Receiving	Michael Mayer	5 receptions, 64 yards

=== at No. 6 USC ===
No. 15 Notre Dame Fighting Irish (8–3) at No. 6 USC Trojans (10–1) – Game summary

Quarter	1	2	3	4	Total
No. 15 Fighting Irish	0	7	7	13	27
No. 6 Trojans	10	7	7	14	38

at Los Angeles Memorial Coliseum • Los Angeles, CA

- Date: November 26, 2022
- Game time: 4:30 p.m. PST
- Game weather: Clear, 64 °F (18 °C)
- Game attendance: 72,613
- Referee: Jerry Magallanes
- TV announcers (ABC): Chris Fowler (play–by–play), Kirk Herbstreit (analyst), Holly Rowe (sideline)

Game information

First Quarter

- (11:24) USC – Tahj Washington 11-yard pass from Caleb Williams, Denis Lynch kick (Drive: 8 plays, 75 yards, 4:24; USC 7–0)
- (4:08) USC – Denis Lynch 31-yard field goal (Drive: 9 plays, 37 yards, 4:18; USC 10–0)

Second Quarter

- (6:55) ND – Michael Mayer 22-yard pass from Drew Pyne, Blake Grupe kick (Drive: 8 plays, 75 yards, 4:24; USC 10–7)
- (0:52) USC – Caleb Williams 5-yard run, Denis Lynch kick (Drive: 10 plays, 75 yards, 5:40; USC 17–7)

Third Quarter

- (8:31) USC – Raleek Brown 5-yard run, Denis Lynch kick (Drive: 7 plays, 74 yards, 2:58; USC 24–7)
- (6:37) ND – Deion Colzie 23-yard pass from Drew Pyne, Blake Grupe kick (Drive: 5 plays, 75 yards, 2:27; USC 24–14)

Fourth Quarter

- (15:00) USC – Caleb Williams 3-yard run, Denis Lynch kick (Drive: 10 plays, 75 yards, 6:01; USC 31–14)
- (12:17) ND – Logan Diggs 5-yard run, Blake Grupe kick (Drive: 7 plays, 75 yards, 2:36; USC 31–21)
- (3:26) USC – Caleb Williams 16-yard run, Denis Lynch kick (Drive: 4 plays, 24 yards, 2:32; USC 38–21)
- (1:24) ND – Michael Mayer 24-yard pass from Drew Pyne (Drive: 6 plays, 56 yards, 1:25; USC 38–27)

Statistics	ND	USC
First downs	22	23
Total yards	52–408	61–436
Rushes/yards	90	204
Passing yards	318	232
Passing: Comp–Att–Int	23–26–1	18–22–0
Time of possession	24:37	35:23

Team	Category	Player	Statistics
Notre Dame	Passing	Drew Pyne	23/26, 318 yards, 3 TD, INT
Notre Dame	Rushing	Audric Estimé	6 carries, 43 yards
Notre Dame	Receiving	Michael Mayer	8 receptions, 98 yards, 2 TD
USC	Passing	Caleb Williams	18/22, 232 yards, TD
USC	Rushing	Austin Jones	25 carries, 154 yards
USC	Receiving	Jordan Addison	3 receptions, 45 yards

=== vs No. 19 South Carolina (Gator Bowl) ===
No. 18 South Carolina Gamecocks (8–4) vs No. 21 Notre Dame Fighting Irish (8–4) – Game summary
(2022 TaxSlayer Gator Bowl)

Quarter	1	2	3	4	Total
No. 21 Fighting Irish	7	10	14	14	45
No. 18 Gamecocks	21	3	7	7	38

at TIAA Bank Field • Jacksonville, FL

- Date: December 30, 2022
- Game time: 3:30 p.m.
- Game weather: Partly cloudy, 70 °F (21 °C)
- Game attendance: 67,383
- Referee: Mike Cannon
- TV announcers (ESPN): Taylor Zarzour (play-by-play), Matt Stinchcomb (analyst), Alyssa Lang (sideline)

Game information

First Quarter

- (11:48) SC – Xavier Legette 13-yard pass from Spencer Rattler, Mitch Jeter kick (Drive: 10 plays, 75 yards, 3:12; South Carolina 7–0)
- (5:54) ND – Tyler Buchner 15-yard run, Blake Grupe kick (Drive: 10 plays, 50 yards, 3:37; Tied 7–7)
- (2:27) SC – Hunter Rogers 23-yard pass from Kai Kroeger, Mitch Jeter kick (Drive: 9 plays, 75 yards, 3:27; South Carolina 14–7)
- (0:44) SC – DQ Smith 47-yard interception return, Mitch Jeter kick (Drive: 5 plays, 19 yards, 1:43; South Carolina 21–7)

Second Quarter

- (8:36) ND – Blake Grupe 37-yard field goal (Drive: 12 plays, 56 yards, 7:08; South Carolina 21–10)
- (5:18) SC – Mitch Jeter 45-yard field goal (Drive: 10 plays, 48 yards, 3:18; South Carolina 24–10)
- (5:06) ND – Logan Diggs 75-yard pass from Tyler Buchner, Blake Grupe kick (Drive: 1 play, 75 yards, 0:12; South Carolina 24–17)

Third Quarter

- (10:28) ND – Tyler Buchner 11-yard run, Blake Grupe kick (Drive: 5 plays, 68 yards, 2:21; Tied 24–24)
- (8:31) SC – Xavier Legette 42-yard pass from Spencer Rattler, Mitch Jeter kick (Drive: 5 plays, 67 yards, 1:57; South Carolina 31–24)
- (0:31) ND – Braden Lenzy 44-yard pass from Tyler Buchner, Blake Grupe kick (Drive: 1 play, 44 yards, 0:08; Tied 31–31)

Fourth Quarter

- (12:41) ND – Logan Diggs 39-yard run, Blake Grupe kick (Drive: 7 plays, 73 yards, 2:13; Notre Dame 38–31)
- (7:42) SC – O'Donnell Fortune 100-yard interception return, Mitch Jeter kick (Drive: 6 plays, 53 yards, 3:27; Tied 38–38)
- (1:38) ND – Mitchell Evans 16-yard pass from Tyler Buchner, Blake Grupe kick (Drive: 12 plays, 80 yards, 6:04; Notre Dame 45–38)

Statistics	ND	SC
First downs	27	20
Total yards	558	352
Rushes/yards	46–264	22–65
Passing yards	294	287
Passing: Comp–Att–Int	19–34–3	31–49–1
Time of possession	36:39	23:21

Team	Category	Player	Statistics
Notre Dame	Passing	Tyler Buchner	18/33, 274 yards, 3 TD, 3 INT
Notre Dame	Rushing	Audric Estimé	14 carries, 95 yards
Notre Dame	Receiving	Braden Lenzy	4 receptions, 89 yards, TD
South Carolina	Passing	Spencer Rattler	29/46, 246 yards, 2 TD, INT
South Carolina	Rushing	Juju McDowell	6 carries, 28 yards
South Carolina	Receiving	Xavier Legette	7 receptions, 78 yards, 2 TD

== Rankings ==
Ranking movements Legend: ██ Increase in ranking ██ Decrease in ranking — = Not ranked RV = Received votes
	Week															
Poll	Pre	1	2	3	4	5	6	7	8	9	10	11	12	13	14	Final
AP	5	8	RV	—	—	—	—	RV	—	—	20	18	13	19	19	18
Coaches	5	9	RV	RV	RV	RV	RV	RV	—	—	25	19	15	19	20	18
CFP	Not released									—	20	18	15	21	21	Not released
