= Benjamin Morrison =

American football player (born 2004)

No. 21 – Tampa Bay Buccaneers
- Position: Cornerback
- Roster status: Active

Personal information
- Born: March 11, 2004 (age 22)
- Listed height: 6 ft 0 in (1.83 m)
- Listed weight: 190 lb (86 kg)

Career information
- High school: Brophy Prep (Phoenix, Arizona)
- College: Notre Dame (2022–2024)
- NFL draft: 2025: 2nd round, 53rd overall pick

Career history
- Tampa Bay Buccaneers (2025–present)

Awards and highlights
- Freshman All-American (2022)

Career NFL statistics as of Week 8, 2026
- Total tackles: 37
- Pass deflections: 6
- Fumble recoveries: 1
- Stats at Pro Football Reference

Benjamin James Morrison (born March 11, 2004) is an American professional football cornerback for the Tampa Bay Buccaneers of the National Football League (NFL). He played college football for the Notre Dame Fighting Irish and was selected by the Buccaneers in the second round of the 2025 NFL draft.

== Early life ==
Morrison attended Brophy College Preparatory in Phoenix, Arizona. As a senior, he had 53 tackles and two interceptions. He played in the 2022 Polynesian Bowl. Morrison committed to the University of Notre Dame to play college football.

College recruiting
| Name | Hometown | School | Height | Weight | Commit date |
|---|---|---|---|---|---|
| Benjamin Morrison; CB | Phoenix | Brophy Prep | 6 ft 0 in (1.83 m) | 172 lb (78 kg) | Jul 15, 2021 |
| Benjamin Morrison; CB | Recruit ratings: Rivals: 247Sports: ESPN: (80) | | | | |

== College career ==
=== 2022 season ===
Morrison earned immediate playing time in his true freshman year at Notre Dame in 2022. He made his collegiate debut on September 3, 2022, against Ohio State, collecting three total tackles and a pass deflection. Against California on September 17, Morrison made his first career start by tallying three tackles. He had his first two career interceptions in an upset victory over Clemson on November 5. Two weeks later, on November 19, he had three interceptions against Boston College, tying the NCAA single-game record. In the 2022 Gator Bowl, Morrison added his team-high sixth interception of the season against South Carolina.

Morrison finished the season with 33 tackles (22 of them solo), four pass breakups, six interceptions, and a pick-six. He was named Freshman All-American by On3.com, College Football News, Pro Football Focus. He was also named True Freshman All-American by The Athletic, 247Sports, ESPN, and by the Football Writers Association of America (FWAA).

=== 2023 season ===
Morrison was named a preseason All-American by NBCSports, FWAA, and ESPN. On June 9, 2023, Morrison was named the fourth best cornerback in college football. He was also placed on the watchlist for the Bronko Nagurski Trophy, the Jim Thorpe Award, and the Chuck Bednarik Award. On September 19 against NC State, Morrison caught his first interception of the season. He also added three solo tackles in a 45–24 victory. In a game against No. 10 USC, Morrison intercepted Caleb Williams, setting up Audric Estimé for a one-yard touchdown run. The Fighting Irish would end up upsetting Williams and the Trojans, 48–20. Morrison would then be ruled out of Notre Dame's game against Pittsburgh due to a quad injury. On November 1, Morrison was named a semifinalist for the Jim Thorpe Award.

=== 2024 season ===
Morrison was once again named a preseason first team All-American by ESPN and The Sporting News. He totaled 20 tackles and four pass breakups in Notre Dame's first six games, including five tackles and two pass breakups in a win against Louisville. Morrison's season was cut short by an injury to his hip sustained in the Irish's 49-7 win over Stanford, which required season-ending surgery. He entered the 2025 NFL draft after Notre Dame's run to the CFP National Championship Game, where they lost to Ohio State.

=== College statistics ===
| Year | Team | Games | | Tackles | | | | | Interceptions | | | | | Fumbles | | |
| Year | Team | GP | GS | Solo | Ast | Cmb | TfL | Sck | Int | Yds | Avg | TD | PD | FR | FF | TD |
|---|---|---|---|---|---|---|---|---|---|---|---|---|---|---|---|---|
| 2022 | Notre Dame | 13 | 9 | 22 | 11 | 33 | 1.0 | 0.0 | 6 | 97 | 16.2 | 1 | 4 | 0 | 0 | 0 |
| 2023 | Notre Dame | 12 | 11 | 25 | 6 | 31 | 3.5 | 0.0 | 3 | 14 | 4.7 | 0 | 10 | 0 | 0 | 0 |
| 2024 | Notre Dame | 6 | 6 | 14 | 6 | 20 | 0.0 | 0.0 | 0 | 0 | 0 | 0 | 4 | 0 | 0 | 0 |
| Career | | 31 | 26 | 61 | 23 | 84 | 4.5 | 0.0 | 9 | 111 | 12.3 | 1 | 18 | 0 | 0 | 0 |

== Professional career ==
Pre-draft measurables
| Height | Weight | Arm length | Hand span | Wingspan | Bench press |
|---|---|---|---|---|---|
| 6 ft 0 1/4 in (1.84 m) | 193 lb (88 kg) | 30 3/8 in (0.77 m) | 9 1/4 in (0.23 m) | 6 ft 3 7/8 in (1.93 m) | 17 reps |
All values from NFL Combine/Pro Day

Morrison was drafted by the Tampa Bay Buccaneers with the 53rd overall pick of 2025 NFL draft.

== Personal life ==
His father, Darryl Morrison, played in the NFL. He has four siblings that also competed in college sports.
