= Foskey =

Foskey is a surname. Notable people with the surname include:

- Deb Foskey (1949–2020), Australian politician
- Isaiah Foskey (born 2000), American football player
