= Tyler Buchner =

American football and lacrosse player (born 2002)

Personal information
- Born: November 7, 2002 (age 24)
- Height: 6 ft 1 in (185 cm)
- Weight: 215 lb (98 kg; 15 st 5 lb)
- Football career

Profile
- Position: Quarterback

Career information
- High school: Helix (La Mesa, California)
- College: Notre Dame (2021–2022); Alabama (2023); Notre Dame (2024–2025)

Awards and highlights
- Gator Bowl MVP (2022)
- Stats at ESPN

Sport
- Sports career
- Position: Midfielder
- NCAA team: Notre Dame (2024–2025)

Career highlights
- NCAA national champion (2024)

Tyler Buchner (born November 7, 2002) is an American former college football quarterback and former college lacrosse midfielder. He played football for the Notre Dame Fighting Irish and Alabama Crimson Tide, and played lacrosse for the Notre Dame Fighting Irish.

== Early life ==
Buchner attended The Bishop's School in La Jolla, California, before transferring to Helix High School in La Mesa, California, for his senior year. He did not play football his senior year in 2020 due to the COVID-19 pandemic. As a junior in 2019, Buchner passed for 4,474 yards with 53 passing touchdowns and 1,610 rushing yards and 28 rushing touchdowns. In a single game that September, Buchner totaled 760 all-purpose yards (465 passing, 295 rushing), the second-most in a single game in California high school football history. He was later named winner of the 2019 Prep Pigskin Report Silver Pigskin, San Diego's award for the county's top high school football player, becoming only the second junior ever to win it, after Reggie Bush. He committed to the University of Notre Dame to play college football over offers from Alabama, TCU, Georgia, USC, and Michigan, among others.

== College career ==
=== Notre Dame ===
Buchner spent his first year at Notre Dame in 2021 as a backup to quarterback Jack Coan. He appeared in 10 games, completing 21 of 35 passes for 298 yards with three touchdowns and three interceptions. He also rushed for 336 yards and three touchdowns. Buchner competed with Drew Pyne to take over as the team's starting quarterback in 2022, which he won. During his second game as starter, he injured his shoulder during Notre Dame's loss to Marshall on September 10, 2022, and missed the remainder of the 2022 regular season. He returned to the field for Notre Dame's 45–38 victory against South Carolina in the 2022 Gator Bowl, accounting for five touchdowns (three passing, two rushing) and earning Gator Bowl MVP honors.

=== Alabama ===
In 2023, he entered the NCAA transfer portal and soon transferred to the University of Alabama. In week three, Buchner started against South Florida in Tampa. He struggled throughout the game, which was delayed by lightning and heavy rain, and was benched in favor of Ty Simpson just before halftime.Nick Saban would announce Jalen Milroe as the starter for the rest of the season.

=== Return to Notre Dame ===
On December 4, 2023, Buchner entered the transfer portal as a men's lacrosse player. He had been a highly ranked lacrosse recruit in high school, and in April 2017 had verbally committed to the University of Michigan for lacrosse before eventually committing to Notre Dame for football. On December 20, 2023, Buchner announced that following the conclusion of Alabama's 2023 football season he would transfer back to Notre Dame to join Notre Dame Fighting Irish men's lacrosse. Buchner, playing as a short-stick defensive midfielder, was part of Notre Dame's 15–5 victory in the 2024 National Championship game against Maryland, having earned a regular role on defense during the team's ACC and NCAA tournament runs. In May 2024, Buchner re-joined the Notre Dame football team as a walk-on wide receiver.

On September 13, 2025, Buchner served as the holder during Notre Dame's game against Texas A&M. With the Irish leading 40–34 late in the fourth quarter, he mishandled the snap on an extra point attempt that would have extended the lead to seven. Texas A&M later scored a touchdown and converted the extra point with 13 seconds remaining to win 41–40. Notre Dame's defense also allowed 488 total yards that night, and some commentators noted that postgame coverage focused heavily on Buchner's mishandled snap despite the broader defensive breakdown.

For the 2025 season, Buchner earned back his athletic scholarship and returned to the quarterback position after playing wide receiver. He served as Notre Dame's backup quarterback for the remainder of his senior season, including in the Irish's 70–7 win over Syracuse on November 22, 2025.

=== College football statistics ===
Season	Team	Games			Passing								Rushing			
Season	Team	GP	GS	Record	Comp	Att	Pct	Yards	Avg	TD	Int	Rate	Att	Yards	Avg	TD
2021	Notre Dame	10	0	–	21	35	60.0	298	8.5	3	3	142.7	46	336	7.3	3
2022	Notre Dame	3	3	1–2	46	83	55.4	651	7.8	3	5	121.2	36	123	3.4	4
2023	Alabama	2	1	1–0	8	19	42.1	61	3.2	0	0	69.1	3	20	6.7	1
2024	Notre Dame	2	0	–	1	1	100.0	23	23.0	0	0	293.2	1	4	4.0	0
2025	Notre Dame	12	0	–	0	0	0.0	0	0.0	0	0	0.0	1	3	3.0	0
Career		29	4	2–2	76	138	55.1	1,033	7.5	6	8	120.7	87	486	5.6	8

=== College lacrosse statistics ===
Year	Team	GP	G	A
2024	Notre Dame	11	0	1
2025	Notre Dame	12	0	0
Career		23	0	1
