= Prince Kollie =

American football player (born 2003)

No. 20
- Position: Linebacker

Personal information
- Born: March 1, 2003 (age 23)
- Listed height: 6 ft 1 in (1.85 m)
- Listed weight: 240 lb (109 kg)

Career information
- High school: David Crockett (Jonesborough, Tennessee)
- College: Notre Dame (2021–2022); Vanderbilt (2023–2025)

Awards and highlights
- High school Butkus Award (2020)
- Stats at ESPN

Prince Phineas Kollie (born March 1, 2003) is an American former college football linebacker for the Notre Dame Fighting Irish and Vanderbilt Commodores.

== Early life ==
Kollie attended David Crockett High School in Jonesborough, Tennessee. Kollie recorded over 100 tackles in his senior season and won the Butkus award. He was a four-star recruit coming out of high school and committed to play at the University of Notre Dame on August 7, 2020.

== College career ==
Kollie began his Notre Dame career in 2021.

=== Statistics ===
Year	Team	GP	Tackles				Interceptions				Fumbles		
Year	Team	GP	Total	Solo	Ast	Sack	PD	Int	Yds	TD	FF	FR	TD
2021	Notre Dame	10	14	6	8	0.0	0	0	0	0	0	0	0
2022	Notre Dame	13	19	13	6	1.5	0	0	0	0	0	0	0
2023	Vanderbilt	0	Did not play										
2024	Vanderbilt	13	19	12	7	1.0	1	0	0	0	0	0	0
2025	Vanderbilt	13	15	9	6	0.0	0	0	0	0	0	0	0
Career		49	67	40	27	2.5	1	0	0	0	0	0	0
