= Marcus Freeman =

American football player and coach (born 1986)

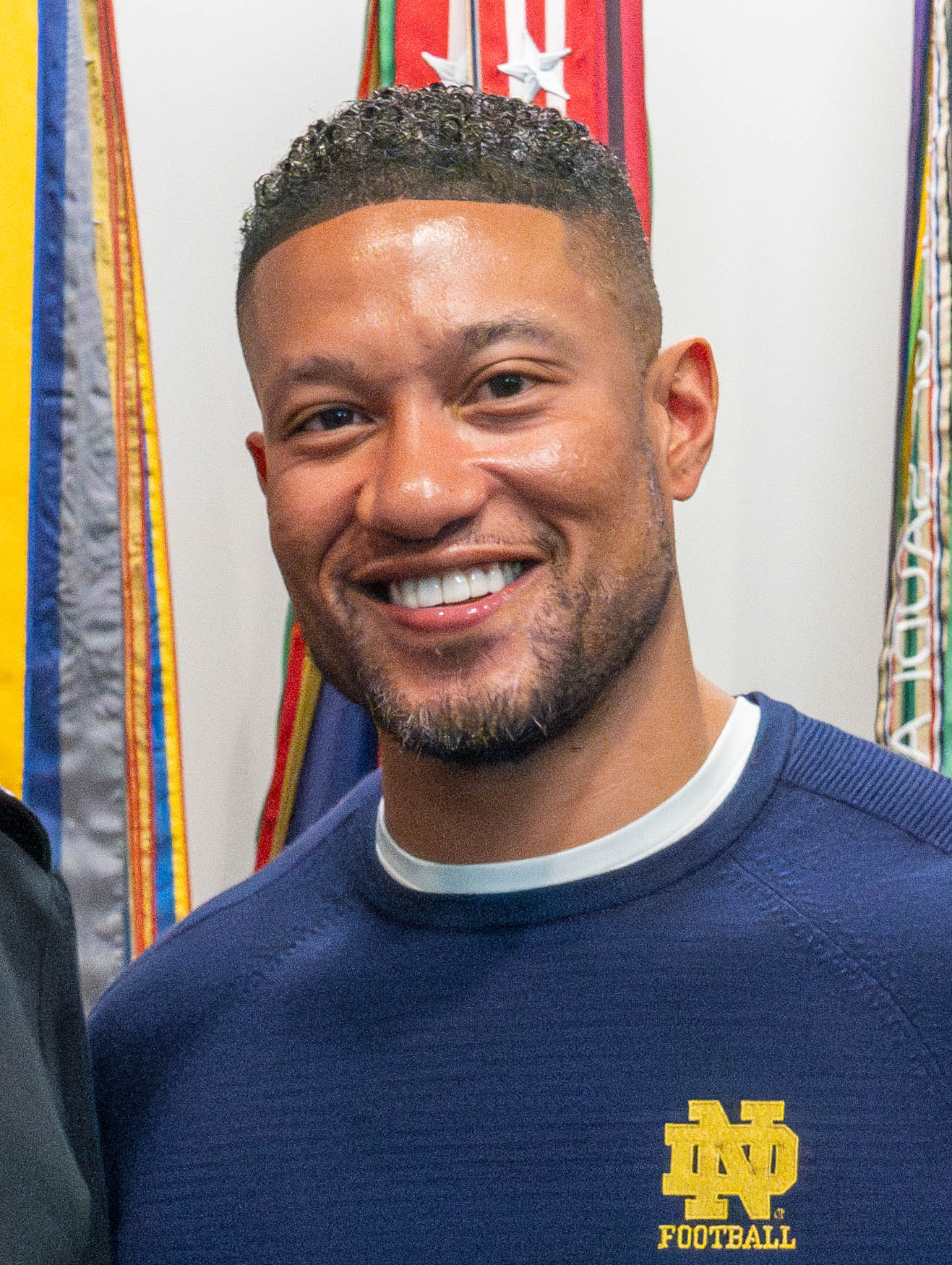
- Freeman in 2024

Notre Dame Fighting Irish
- Title: Head coach

Personal information
- Born: January 10, 1986 (age 40); Dayton, Ohio, U.S.
- Listed height: 6 ft 1 in (1.85 m)
- Listed weight: 240 lb (109 kg)

Career information
- Position: Linebacker
- High school: Wayne (Huber Heights, Ohio)
- College: Ohio State (2004–2008)
- NFL draft: 2009: 5th round, 154th overall pick

Career history

Playing
- Chicago Bears (2009)*; Buffalo Bills (2009)*; Houston Texans (2009)*
- * Offseason or practice squad member only

Coaching
- Ohio State (2010) Graduate assistant; Kent State (2011–2012) Linebackers coach; Purdue (2013–2016); Linebackers coach (2013–2015); Co-defensive coordinator & linebackers coach (2016); Cincinnati (2017–2020) Defensive coordinator & linebackers coach; Notre Dame (2021–present); Defensive coordinator & linebackers coach (2021); Head coach (2021–present)

Awards and highlights
- Playing: 2× second-team All-Big Ten (2007, 2008); Coaching: Bobby Dodd Coach of the Year (2024); George Munger Award (2024); Paul "Bear" Bryant Award (2024)

Head coaching record
- Regular season: 46–11 (.807)
- Postseason: 5–2 (.714)
- Career: 51–13 (.797)

Marcus Louis Freeman (born January 10, 1986) is an American football coach and former linebacker who is the 32nd head football coach at the University of Notre Dame. He previously served as the defensive coordinator and linebackers coach at Notre Dame in 2021. Freeman was also an assistant coach at the University of Cincinnati, Purdue University, Kent State University, and Ohio State University.

Freeman played college football at Ohio State and was drafted by the Chicago Bears in the fifth round of the 2009 NFL draft, but was released before the regular season. He then served on practice squads for the Buffalo Bills and Houston Texans. Following the 2009 season, he retired from his playing career due to a heart condition.

== Early life and education ==
Marcus Freeman was born at the Wright-Patterson Air Force Base Medical Center in Dayton, Ohio. Freeman's mother, Chong Freeman, is from South Korea, and met his father, Michael Freeman, an African American, while he was serving in the U.S. Air Force and then moved to Ohio in 1976. He has an older brother, Michael Jr.

Freeman attended Wayne High School in Huber Heights, Ohio. He totaled 152 tackles, including 29 behind the line of scrimmage, and eight sacks as a junior. As a senior, he was rated as one of the top three overall prospects in Ohio and was named to the Parade All-American Team after being credited with 127 tackles, four sacks, three forced fumbles, and three fumble recoveries as a senior. Freeman was a four-year starter and a two-time first-team All-Ohio selection. He was also part of the track and field team, competing in the 4 × 100 metres relay and throwing the shot and discus. As a freshman, Freeman was part of the team that won the OHSAA track and field championship.

== College playing career ==
=== 2004 season ===
Freeman finished his freshman season in 2004 with four tackles (one solo) while playing in 13 games.

=== 2005 season ===
Freeman was redshirted in 2005 after injuring his knee in the Buckeyes' first game against Miami (OH).

=== 2006 season ===
During the 2006 season, Freeman made 71 tackles while playing in 13 games, 11 of which he started, and was second on the team with six pass break-ups and two interceptions.

=== 2007 season ===
In 2007, Freeman was a second-year starting linebacker and a part of three special units. He was later named second-team All-Big Ten after he totaled 109 tackles, 9.5 tackles for loss, and five pass deflections.

=== 2008 season ===
In 2008, Freeman started all 13 games for the Buckeyes, tallying 84 tackles (39 solo), 9.5 tackles for loss, four pass breakups, a fumble recovery, and 3.5 sacks. For his efforts, he was named to the All-Big Ten second team for a second straight year and was an Academic All-Big Ten selection. Following the season, Freeman declared for the 2009 NFL draft.

Freeman appeared in 51 games (37 starts) throughout his career. He started 26 games at weak-side linebacker and 11 games at strong-side linebacker and was a two-time Second-team All-Big Ten selection. He finished his career 19th on the school's all-time tackle list with 268 stops (140 solo) and was credited with 21.5 TFLs, 6.0 sacks, 15 PBUs, 2 forced fumbles and 1 fumble recovery.

=== College statistics ===
| Year | Team | Games | | Tackles | | | | | Interceptions | | | | | Fumbles | | |
| Year | Team | GP | GS | Solo | Ast | Cmb | TfL | Sck | Int | Yds | Avg | TD | PD | FR | FF | TD |
|---|---|---|---|---|---|---|---|---|---|---|---|---|---|---|---|---|
| 2004 | Ohio State | 12 | 0 | 1 | 3 | 4 | 0.0 | 0.0 | 0 | 0 | 0.0 | 0 | 0 | 0 | 0 | 0 |
| 2005 | Ohio State | 0 | 0 | Redshirt | | | | | | | | | | | | |
| 2006 | Ohio State | 13 | 11 | 34 | 37 | 71 | 2.5 | 1.0 | 2 | 5 | 2.5 | 0 | 6 | 0 | 0 | 0 |
| 2007 | Ohio State | 13 | 13 | 66 | 43 | 109 | 9.5 | 1.5 | 0 | 0 | 0.0 | 0 | 5 | 0 | 2 | 0 |
| 2008 | Ohio State | 13 | 13 | 39 | 45 | 84 | 9.5 | 3.5 | 0 | 0 | 0.0 | 0 | 4 | 1 | 0 | 0 |
| Career | | 51 | 37 | 140 | 128 | 268 | 21.5 | 6.0 | 2 | 5 | 2.5 | 0 | 15 | 1 | 2 | 0 |

== Professional playing career ==
=== Pre-draft ===
Pre-draft measurables
| Height | Weight | Arm length | Hand span | 40-yard dash | 10-yard split | 20-yard split | 20-yard shuttle | Three-cone drill | Vertical jump | Broad jump | Bench press |
|---|---|---|---|---|---|---|---|---|---|---|---|
| 6 ft 0 5/8 in (1.84 m) | 239 lb (108 kg) | 32 in (0.81 m) | 9 in (0.23 m) | 4.51 s | 1.55 s | 2.59 s | 4.08 s | 6.66 s | 37.0 in (0.94 m) | 9 ft 5 in (2.87 m) | 30 reps |
All values from NFL Combine/Pro Day

=== Chicago Bears (2009) ===
Freeman was drafted in the fifth round of the 2009 NFL draft by the Chicago Bears, and appeared in all four Bears preseason games. On September 4, he was waived.

=== Buffalo Bills (2009) ===
On September 22, Freeman signed onto the Buffalo Bills practice squad. The team released him on October 5.

=== Houston Texans (2009) ===
On November 4, Freeman signed with the Houston Texans practice squad, where he finished out the 2009 season.

=== Retirement ===
Before signing with the Indianapolis Colts, Freeman was diagnosed with an enlarged heart condition by a team physician in February 2010. He retired May 1.

== Coaching career ==
=== Ohio State (2010) ===
Freeman served as a graduate assistant at Ohio State in 2010.

=== Kent State (2011–2012) ===
In January 2011, Freeman was hired as the linebackers coach for Kent State, a position he would hold until 2012.

=== Purdue (2013–2016) ===
On January 18, 2013, Freeman was hired as the linebackers coach for the Purdue Boilermakers. In 2016, Freeman was promoted to co-defensive coordinator. Freeman helped transform the linebackers group into a strength for the Boilermakers, coaching future NFL players Danny Ezechukwu and Ja'Whaun Bentley.

=== Cincinnati (2017–2020) ===
On December 13, 2016, Freeman joined the Cincinnati Bearcats football staff as defensive coordinator and linebackers coach. After being one of the first hires by Luke Fickell, Freeman transformed the Bearcats into one of the best defenses of the American Athletic Conference (AAC). In 2018, Freeman's defense led the AAC in rushing defense, scoring defense and total defense and ranked among the Top-15 in the NCAA FBS in all three categories. The next season, the Bearcats finished atop the 2019 AAC ranks in scoring defense for the second-straight season and ranked among the league's top three in rushing and total defense.

Prior to the end of the 2020 season, Freeman had declined a handful of positions to remain at Cincinnati including offers of returning to Ohio State as linebackers coach, linebackers coach for the Tennessee Titans, and defensive coordinator at Michigan State, among other offers. Freeman had been considered by a number of national outlets as one of the rising stars of the college coaching ranks.

Freeman was a finalist for the Broyles Award and named the 247Sports Defensive Coordinator of the Year during the 2020 season.

=== Notre Dame (2021–present) ===
On January 8, 2021, Freeman was hired as defensive coordinator and linebackers coach for the Notre Dame Fighting Irish. Head coach Brian Kelly said Freeman was the top choice for the defensive coordinator position. Prior to this hiring, it was rumored that Freeman would join LSU in the same role.

==== 2021 season ====
Following the 2021 regular season, Brian Kelly left Notre Dame to become the head coach for LSU. On December 3, 2021, Freeman was selected to replace him, becoming the 32nd head coach in program history. Freeman took control immediately, coaching the Irish in their Fiesta Bowl loss to No. 9 Oklahoma State.

==== 2022 season ====
Freeman opened the 2022 season with losses to No. 2 Ohio State and Marshall, thus becoming first head coach in Notre Dame history to start his career with three losses.

He gained his first win the following week against the California Golden Bears. Freeman's Irish went on to finish the regular season ranked 19th with a record of 8–4, including a win over No. 5 Clemson. They were awarded a berth in the Gator Bowl, where they defeated South Carolina 45–38.

==== 2023 season ====
Analysts anticipated the 2023 season would be a step forward for Freeman's Fighting Irish. During the offseason, they secured the top-ranked quarterback in the transfer portal, Wake Forest's Sam Hartman, and they entered the season ranked 13th. After beginning the season 4–0 with comfortable wins over Navy, Tennessee State, North Carolina State, and Central Michigan, the Irish rose to 9th in the rankings. They fell at home the next week to Ohio State, 17–14, in a heartbreaking loss that saw Notre Dame with only 10 players on the field, instead of the usual 11, twice on Ohio State's game-winning drive. They rebounded the next week with a thrilling win over No. 17 Duke, but then lost the following game to No. 25 Louisville. One week later, the Irish enjoyed a season-defining 48–20 victory over No. 10 USC and Heisman Trophy-winning quarterback Caleb Williams. Following a bye week, Freeman's Irish defeated Pittsburgh and fell to unranked Clemson before winning against Wake Forest and Stanford to finish the regular season 9–3. They faced No. 19 Oregon State in the Sun Bowl, winning 40–8 to conclude the season 10–3 and ranked 14th. The 2023 campaign was defined by strong performances from star running back Audric Estime, quarterback Sam Hartman, tight end Mitchell Evans, and safety Xavier Watts, but it was also marred by poor play at the wide receiver position, especially following early injuries to veteran receivers Jayden Thomas and Deion Colzie. Evans's injury against Pittsburgh left the Irish without any reliable pass catchers, and the team struggled when unable to run the ball at will.

Following the season, Freeman fired wide receivers coach Chansi Stuckey, prompting the departure of starting wide receivers Chris Tyree, Tobias Meriweather, and Rico Flores Jr. Freeman hired Mike Brown as the new receivers coach on December 10. He then got quarterback Riley Leonard in the transfer portal from Duke.

==== 2024 season ====
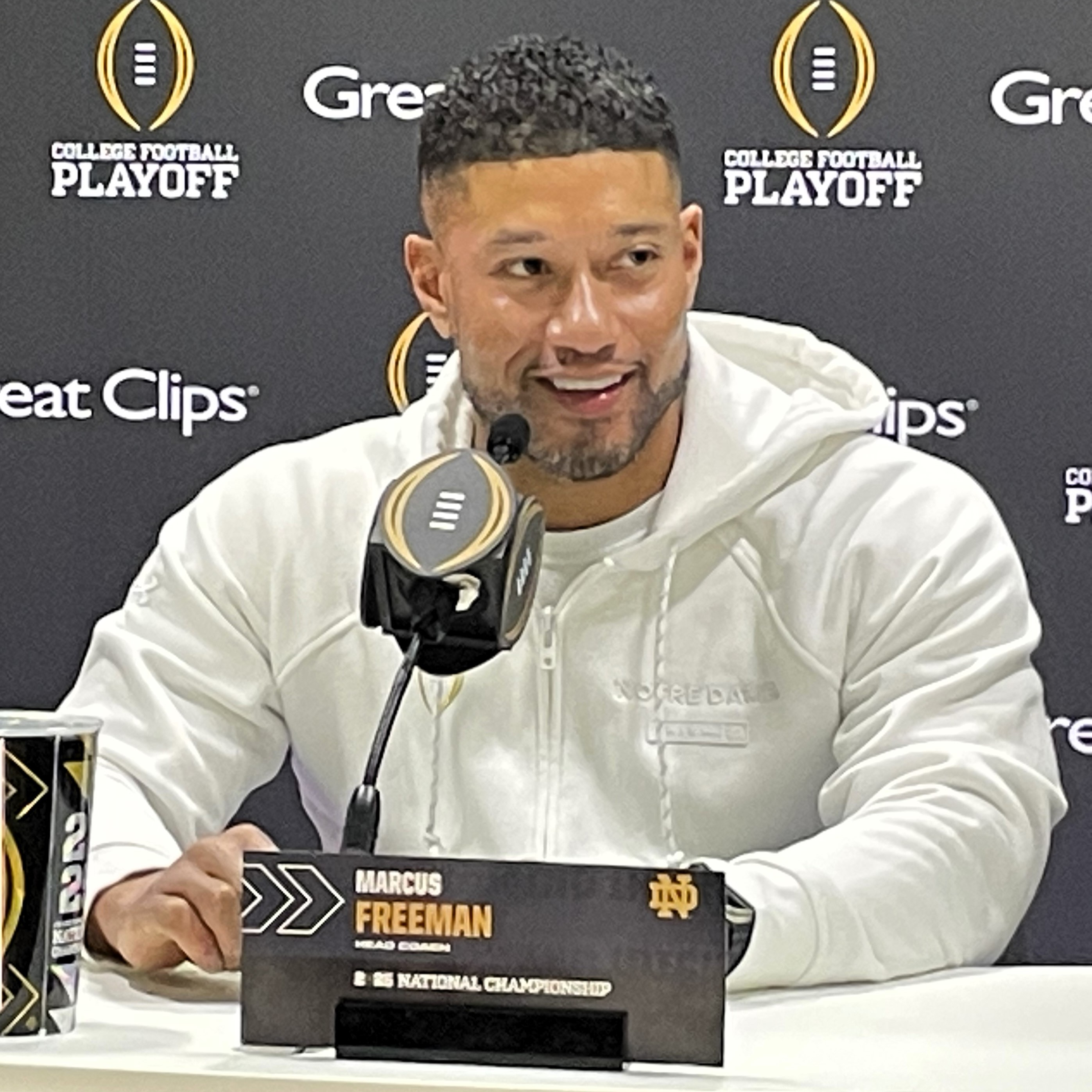
Freeman talking to press ahead of the 2025 CFP National Championship.

Freeman's 2024 squad started their campaign successfully on the road against No. 20 Texas A&M in College Station, Texas with a 23–13 win, but followed that victory up with a 16–14 loss to Northern Illinois as a 29.5-point betting favorite, becoming the first AP Top 5 team to ever suffer a loss to a football team from the Mid-American Conference (MAC). The Irish finished the regular season with a 10-game winning streak with wins over No. 15 Louisville, No. 24 Navy, No. 19 Army, and a 49–35 win against USC in the renewed rivalry game.

The Irish were granted the 7th seed in the College Football Playoff, hosting their first-ever home playoff game at Notre Dame Stadium. Freeman won his first playoff game with a 27–17 win over 10th-seeded Indiana. Originally Notre Dame was set to play the 2nd-seeded Georgia Bulldogs in the Sugar Bowl on January 1, 2025, but due to the 2025 New Orleans truck attack that happened near the Caesars Superdome the game was rescheduled to the following day. Notre Dame beat Georgia by a score of 23–10, marking the first time in program history that Notre Dame had a 13-win season. Notre Dame then proceeded to beat the 6th-seeded Penn State Nittany Lions in the Orange Bowl, advancing to the national title game for the first time in 12 years. Freeman became the first African American, as well as the first Asian American, head coach to reach a Division I national college football championship. They lost the championship game to his alma mater, Ohio State, 34–23, the winner of the Cotton Bowl Classic.

==== 2025 season ====
Notre Dame was ranked as the No. 6 Team in the preseason AP Poll. However, the Irish started the season 0–2 after No. 10 Miami hit a go-ahead field goal with 1:01 remaining in the fourth quarter and then No. 16 Texas A&M scored a go-ahead touchdown with 13 seconds remaining. In Week 8, the Irish won their first ranked game of the season by defeating No. 20 USC.

Notre Dame set their modern-era scoring record by defeating Syracuse 70–7 in South Bend, marking the first time the team scored 70 points since 1932. Notre Dame concluded the season on a 10-game win streak with all wins coming by double figures after defeating Stanford 49–20.

After finishing the regular season 10–2, the Irish opted out of participating in a bowl game after not being selected for the College Football Playoff.

== Head coaching record ==
| Year | Team | Overall | Conference | Standing | Bowl/playoffs | Coaches^{#} | AP^{°} |
|---|---|---|---|---|---|---|---|
Notre Dame Fighting Irish (NCAA Division I FBS independent) (2021–present)
| 2021 | Notre Dame | 0–1 (Note: Head coach Brian Kelly resigned after the regular season to become the head coach at LSU. Freeman coached the 2022 Fiesta Bowl in Kelly’s place. Notre Dame credits the regular season to Kelly and the Fiesta Bowl to Freeman.) | | | L Fiesta^{†} | 9 | 8 |
| 2022 | Notre Dame | 9–4 | | | W Gator | 18 | 18 |
| 2023 | Notre Dame | 10–3 | | | W Sun | 14 | 14 |
| 2024 | Notre Dame | 14–2 | | | W CFP First Round^{†}, W Sugar^{†}, W Orange^{†}, L CFP NCG^{†} | 2 | 2 |
| 2025 | Notre Dame | 10–2 | | | | 11 | 10 |
| 2026 | Notre Dame | 10–1 | | | | | |
| Notre Dame: | | 53–13 | | | | | |
| Total: | | 53–13 | | | | | |
National championship Conference title Conference division title or championship game berth
^{†}Indicates CFP / New Years' Six bowl.; ^{#}Rankings from final Coaches Poll.; ^{°}Rankings from final AP Poll.

== Personal life ==
In 2010, Freeman married Joanna (née Herncane), whom he had dated since college. The couple have six children. In 2022, Freeman became a Catholic.
