= Brian Mason (American football) =

American football player and coach

Indianapolis Colts
- Title: Special teams coordinator

Personal information
- Born: Zionsville, Indiana, U.S.

Career information
- High school: Zionsville (IN)
- College: Denison

Career history
- Denison (2007–2008) Student Assistant; Bluffton (2009–2011) Defensive line coach; Kent State (2012) Graduate assistant; Purdue (2013–2014) Graduate assistant; Ohio State (2015–2016) Graduate assistant; Cincinnati (2017) Director of recruiting; Cincinnati (2018–2021) Special teams coordinator; Notre Dame (2022) Special teams coordinator; Indianapolis Colts (2023–present) Special teams coordinator

Brian S. Mason is an American football coach and former player who is the special teams coordinator for the Indianapolis Colts of the National Football League (NFL).

He was previously the special teams coordinator at University of Notre Dame in 2022 where he had one of the best special teams unit in the country. The year before he was The University of Cincinnati special teams coordinator. Prior to that, Mason was the Director of Recruiting at The University of Cincinnati for the 2017 season. Mason was a Graduate Assistant from 2009 to 2016 with stops at Bluffton (Graduate defensive line coach, 2009–11), Kent State (2012), Purdue (2013–14), and Ohio State (2015–2016). He played running back at Denison for two years before an injury forced him to transition from player to coach. He was a student assistant running back coach at Denison for the 2007 and 2008 seasons.

== Coaching career ==
=== Early coaching career ===
From 2007 to 2008, Mason was a student assistant running backs coach at Denison University. Mason coached at Bluffton University from 2009 until 2011, serving as a graduate assistant defensive line coach. From Bluffton, Mason moved to Kent State University as a defensive graduate assistant on Darrell Hazell’s staff for the 2012 season, and followed Hazell to Purdue University for the 2013 and 2014 seasons.

=== Ohio State ===
Mason joined the staff at Ohio State University in 2015 and was a graduate assistant for two years.

=== Cincinnati ===
In January 2017, he was named the Director of Recruiting for the University of Cincinnati, and then in January 2018, he was promoted to Special Teams Coordinator. Mason helped lead the Bearcats to an appearance in the 2021 College Football Playoff.

=== Notre Dame ===
In January 2022, it was reported he would become the Special Teams Coordinator at the University of Notre Dame. The move re-united Mason with Marcus Freeman, whom he previously worked with at Ohio State, Cincinnati, and Purdue.

=== Indianapolis Colts ===
On March 4, 2023, the Indianapolis Colts hired Mason as their special teams coordinator.

During the final play of the first NFL preseason game in 2026, Mason was collected in a pile of players who were going out of bounds. The entanglement crashed into his knee, tearing multiple ligaments.

== Personal life ==
Mason is a native of Zionsville, Indiana where he played football for Zionsville Community High School. He holds a bachelor's degree in economics (Denison) and master's degrees in education (Bluffton, 2012), recreation and sports management (Purdue, 2014), and kinesiology, sport management (Ohio State, 2016).
