= Chris Smith (defensive tackle) =

American football player (born 1999)

No. 96 – Miami Dolphins
- Position: Defensive tackle
- Roster status: Practice squad

Personal information
- Born: December 15, 1999 (age 26); Detroit, Michigan, U.S.
- Listed height: 6 ft 1 in (1.85 m)
- Listed weight: 316 lb (143 kg)

Career information
- High school: Cranbrook Kingswood HS (MI)
- College: Harvard (2018–2021); Notre Dame (2022)
- NFL draft: 2023: undrafted

Career history
- Detroit Lions (2023–2026); Miami Dolphins (2026–present)*
- * Offseason or practice squad member only

Career NFL statistics as of 2025
- Tackles: 2
- Stats at Pro Football Reference

Christopher Smith (born December 15, 1999) is an American professional football defensive tackle for the Miami Dolphins of the National Football League (NFL). He played college football for the Harvard Crimson and Notre Dame Fighting Irish.

== Early life ==
Smith was born on December 15, 1999. He grew up in Detroit, Michigan, and attended Cranbrook Kingswood High School. In high school, he started all four years for the football team and was a four-time All-Catholic Football selection, two-time all-state selection and two-time team defensive player of the year. He served as team captain as a senior in football and was chosen the team MVP; he also played three years for the basketball team and was team captain in that sport as a senior as well. He committed to play college football for the Harvard Crimson.

== College career ==
Smith appeared in nine games for Harvard as a freshman in 2018, posting 11 tackles and a half-sack. He then had 21 tackles, two tackles-for-loss (TFLs) and 1.5 sacks while appearing in 10 games in the 2019 season; the 2020 season was canceled due to the COVID-19 pandemic. In 2021, Smith was chosen first-team All-Ivy League after totaling 44 tackles, five TFLs and 3.5 sacks while starting all 10 games.

Smith graduated from Harvard in 2021 with a degree in human evolutionary biology, but opted to remain in college for a final year, entering the NCAA transfer portal after the season. He ended his tenure at Harvard having recorded 72 tackles, 7.5 TFLs and 5.5 sacks in 29 games played. He initially committed to transfer to the Minnesota Golden Gophers, but later flipped his commitment to the Notre Dame Fighting Irish. With the Fighting Irish, Smith appeared in 13 games, five as a starter, and recorded 17 tackles with 0.5 TFLs and a forced fumble.

=== Statistics ===
Year	Team	Games		Tackles				Interceptions				Fumbles		
Year	Team	GP	GS	Total	Solo	Ast	Sack	PD	Int	Yds	TD	FF	FR	TD
2018	Harvard	9	0	11	2	9	0.5	0	0	0	0	0	0	0
2019	Harvard	10	4	21	10	11	1.5	0	0	0	0	0	1	0
2020	Harvard	0	0	No team – COVID-19 pandemic										
2021	Harvard	10	10	40	13	27	3.5	0	0	0	0	2	0	0
2022	Notre Dame	13	5	17	10	7	0.0	0	0	0	0	1	0	0
Career		42	19	89	35	54	5.5	0	0	0	0	3	1	0

== Professional career ==
Pre-draft measurables
Height	Weight	Arm length	Hand span	Wingspan	40-yard dash	10-yard split	20-yard split	20-yard shuttle	Three-cone drill	Vertical jump	Broad jump	Bench press
6 ft 1 1/4 in (1.86 m)	302 lb (137 kg)	31 1/4 in (0.79 m)	9 7/8 in (0.25 m)	6 ft 4 1/4 in (1.94 m)	5.08 s	1.76 s	2.94 s	4.60 s	7.25 s	31 in (0.79 m)	9 ft 1 in (2.77 m)	37 reps
All values from Pro Day

=== Detroit Lions ===
After going unselected in the 2023 NFL draft, Smith signed with the Detroit Lions as an undrafted free agent. He was waived at the final roster cuts, on August 29, and then re-signed to the practice squad the following day. He was released from the practice squad on September 20, re-signed on December 13, released on December 29, and re-signed on January 14, 2024. Following the regular season, in which he played no games, Smith signed a reserve/future contract with Detroit on January 30.

Smith was released at the roster cuts for the 2024 season, on August 27, 2024, and was then re-signed to the practice squad a day later. On September 7, he was signed to the active roster, one day prior to the team's Week 1 game against the Los Angeles Rams. He made his NFL debut in the game, recording one tackle while appearing on eight defensive snaps. On September 9, one day after the game, Smith was released by the Lions. On September 11, he was re-signed to the practice squad. He was promoted to the active roster on November 2. He was waived on December 23, and re-signed to the practice squad, making his Monday Night Football debut against the San Francisco 49ers on December 30. He signed a reserve/future contract with the Lions on January 20, 2025.

On October 11, 2025, Smith was waived by the Lions and re-signed to the practice squad three days later. He signed a reserve/future contract with Detroit on January 5, 2026.

On August 30, 2026, Smith was waived by the Lions as a part of final roster cuts; he was re-signed to the team's practice squad the following day. He was released on October 20.

=== Miami Dolphins ===
On November 17, 2026, Smith signed with the Miami Dolphins practice squad.

== NFL career statistics ==
Year	Team	Games		Tackles					Interceptions						Fumbles		
Year	Team	GP	GS	Total	Solo	Ast	Sck	Sfty	PD	Int	Yds	Avg	Lng	TD	FF	FR	TD
2024	DET	5	0	2	0	2	0.0	0	0	0	0	0.0	0	0	0	0	0
Career		5	0	2	0	2	0.0	0	0	0	0	0.0	0	0	0	0	0
