= Drew Pyne =

American football player (born 2000)

Profile
- Position: Quarterback

Personal information
- Born: December 5, 2000 (age 25); New Canaan, Connecticut, U.S.
- Listed height: 6 ft 0 in (1.83 m)
- Listed weight: 200 lb (91 kg)

Career information
- High school: New Canaan
- College: Notre Dame (2020–2022); Arizona State (2023); Missouri (2024); Bowling Green (2025)
- Stats at ESPN

Andrew M. Pyne (born December 5, 2000) is an American former college football quarterback. He played football for the Notre Dame Fighting Irish, Arizona State Sun Devils, Missouri Tigers, and Bowling Green Falcons.

== Early life ==
Pyne was born on December 5, 2000, in New Canaan, Connecticut. He attended and played high school football for New Canaan High School in New Canaan. As a senior, he completed 161 of 252 passes for 2,107 yards and 24 touchdowns. He was selected to play in the 2020 Under Armour All-American Game. Pyne committed to the University of Notre Dame to play college football.

== College career ==
=== Notre Dame ===
Pyne played in four games as a backup to Ian Book in his first year at Notre Dame in 2020. He completed two of three passes for 12 yards. As a sophomore in 2021, he played in two games as a backup to Jack Coan, completing 15 of 30 passes for 224 yards with two touchdowns. Pyne competed with Tyler Buchner to take over as the team's starting quarterback in 2022. Buchner won the job; however, Pyne took over as the starter after Buchner suffered a season-ending injury during the team's second game of the season. On December 2, 2022, Pyne entered the transfer portal.

=== Arizona State ===
On December 19, 2022, Pyne announced he would transfer to Arizona State. Pyne would only play in 2 games at Arizona State due to injuries. Pyne left Arizona State and returned to Notre Dame to finish his degree.

=== Missouri ===
On March 10, 2024, Pyne announced that he would transfer to Missouri after the completion of his academic degree from Notre Dame in the spring semester of 2024, with the expectation that he would compete to be the backup quarterback to Brady Cook for the Tigers' 2024 football season. Pyne transferred with three years of eligibility. For the Tigers, he appeared in six games with one start. His lone start came against Oklahoma where he completed 14-of-27 passes for 143 yards and three touchdowns in the victory.

=== Bowling Green ===
On April 7, 2025, Pyne announced he was transferring to Bowling Green. Pyne was unable to play spring football for the Falcons, as he has already played in the spring at Missouri. He enrolled on May 18, 2025.

=== Statistics ===
Year	Team	Games			Passing								Rushing			
Year	Team	GP	GS	Record	Cmp	Att	Pct	Yds	Avg	TD	Int	Rtg	Att	Yds	Avg	TD
2020	Notre Dame	4	0	—	2	3	66.7	12	4.0	0	0	100.3	1	4	4.0	0
2021	Notre Dame	2	0	—	15	30	50.0	224	7.5	2	0	134.7	6	−6	−1.0	0
2022	Notre Dame	11	10	8–2	164	254	64.6	2,021	8.0	22	6	155.3	47	108	2.3	2
2023	Arizona State	2	1	0–1	26	49	53.1	273	5.6	2	3	101.1	14	−49	−3.5	0
2024	Missouri	6	1	1–0	49	82	59.8	391	4.8	3	3	104.6	15	21	1.4	0
2025	Bowling Green	6	6	2–4	94	151	62.3	882	5.8	4	5	113.4	30	−14	−0.5	0
Career		31	18	11–7	350	569	61.5	3,803	6.7	33	17	130.8	113	64	0.6	2
