= Michael Vinson =

American football player (born 1999)

Current position
- Title: Assistant Special Teams Coach
- Team: Notre Dame

Biographical details
- Born: August 27, 1999 (age 27); Winnetka, Illinois, U.S.
- Height: 6 ft 2 in (188 cm)
- Weight: 242 lb (110 kg; 17 st 4 lb)
- Education: New Trier High School; University of Notre Dame

Playing career
- 2018–2023: Notre Dame
- Position: Long snapper

Coaching career (HC unless noted)
- 2024–2025: Notre Dame (Football Analyst, Special Teams)
- 2026: Notre Dame (Assistant Special Teams Coach)

Accomplishments and honors

Awards
- First-team All-American (2022)

Michael Thomas Vinson (born August 27, 1999) is an American former college football long snapper. He played for the Notre Dame Fighting Irish and was a first-team All-American in 2022.

== Early life ==
Vinson was born in Winnetka, Illinois. He first began snapping footballs when in fifth grade and over time became more interested about being a long snapper. When in eighth grade, he read an article about John Shannon, a long snapper for the Notre Dame Fighting Irish, and decided his goal was to be like him. He attended New Trier High School in Winnetka and was put on the freshman "B" football team in his first year. He attended Chris Rubio's long snapping camps afterwards and his career began to "blossom" as a sophomore and junior. Prior to his senior year, he won a competition at Notre Dame and was given a preferred walk-on opportunity. He committed to play college football for the Fighting Irish even though Army had offered an athletic scholarship and several other schools had shown interest.

== College career ==
Vinson was backup to his inspiration, John Shannon, during the 2018 and 2019 seasons. As a freshman in 2018, he saw no playing time. He received the nickname "Milk" that year, by which he is often known. The nickname originated from head coach Brian Kelly dubbing the starting special teams squad the "Cheese Unit." As Vinson was a freshman and had not yet become a starter, he had not yet earned "his cheese status." He recalled that he had been in coach Kelly's way in the locker room, and Kelly told him "Get out of my way, Milk!" and the name stuck.

Vinson saw his first playing time for Notre Dame in the 2019 season, seeing limited action against the Bowling Green Falcons and New Mexico Lobos. He also handled long snapping duties in practice while Shannon dealt with an injury in order to save Shannon for games. Vinson was poised to be a starter in 2020 after Shannon graduated, but the team then brought in on scholarship Alex Peitsch, ranked the best high school player at the position. Making things more difficult, the practice schedule was disrupted by the COVID-19 pandemic, giving him little time to prove whether he was a better option than Peitsch. Despite his situation, Vinson was able to win the job after impressing in the preseason practices. He appeared in every game in the 2020 season and helped Notre Dame reach the Rose Bowl. He repeated playing every game in 2021 and was put on scholarship after the season.

Prior to the 2022 season, Vinson signed a name, image and likeness (NIL) deal with the American Dairy Association of Indiana. He again played every game in 2022 and at the end of the year was selected first-team All-American by the American Football Coaches Association (AFCA). He returned for a final season in 2023, citing hopes of a future National Football League (NFL) career.

== Professional career ==
Pre-draft measurables
Height	Weight	Arm length	Hand span
6 ft 1 3/8 in (1.86 m)	230 lb (104 kg)	30 7/8 in (0.78 m)	8 3/4 in (0.22 m)
All values from Pro Day
