= Mitchell Evans (American football) =

American football player (born 2003)

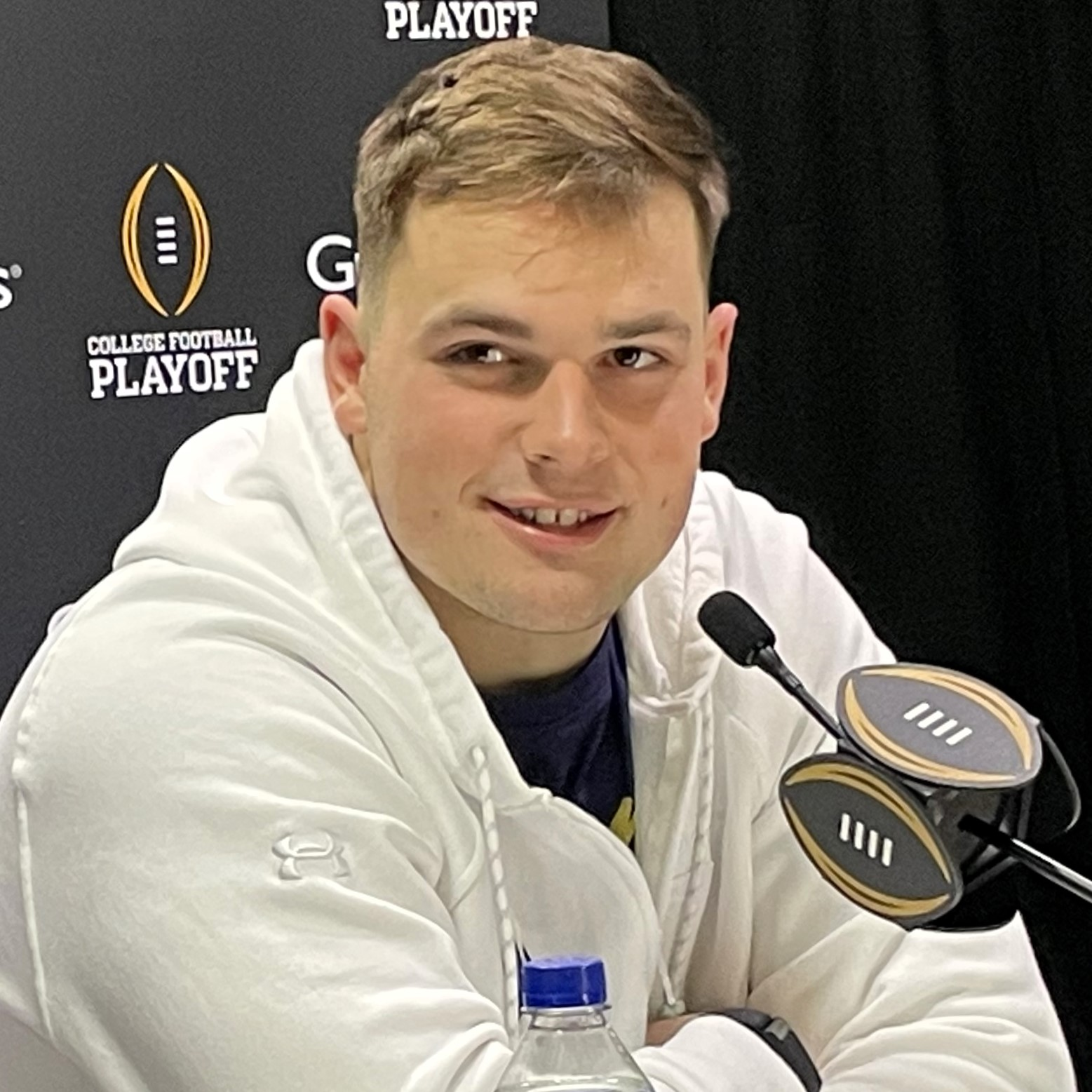
- Evans talking to press ahead of the 2025 CFP National Championship

No. 84 – Carolina Panthers
- Position: Tight end
- Roster status: Active

Personal information
- Born: March 18, 2003 (age 23)
- Listed height: 6 ft 5 in (1.96 m)
- Listed weight: 265 lb (120 kg)

Career information
- High school: Wadsworth (OH)
- College: Notre Dame (2021–2024)
- NFL draft: 2025: 5th round, 163rd overall pick

Career history
- Carolina Panthers (2025–present)

Career NFL statistics as of 2025
- Receptions: 19
- Receiving yards: 171
- Receiving touchdowns: 2
- Stats at Pro Football Reference

Mitchell James Evans (born March 18, 2003) is an American professional football tight end for the Carolina Panthers of the National Football League (NFL). He played college football for the Notre Dame Fighting Irish and was selected by the Panthers in the fifth round of the 2025 NFL draft.

== Early life ==
Evans attended Wadsworth High School in Wadsworth, Ohio. He was the starting quarterback his senior year in high school in 2020, passing for 23 touchdowns and 2,132 yards. As a tight end his junior year in 2019, he had 19 receptions for 306 yards and seven touchdowns. Evans committed to the University of Notre Dame to play college football.

== College career ==
Evans played in 20 games as a backup to Michael Mayer his first two years at Notre Dame and had five receptions for 60 yards and a touchdown total. In 2023, he took over as the team's starting tight end.

=== Statistics ===
Year	Team	Games		Receiving					Rushing				
Year	Team	GP	GS	Rec	Yds	Avg	Lng	TD	Att	Yds	Avg	Lng	TD
2021	Notre Dame	13	0	2	21	10.5	13	0	0	0	0.0	0	0
2022	Notre Dame	8	7	3	39	13.0	18	1	7	11	1.6	4	1
2023	Notre Dame	8	7	29	422	14.6	36	1	1	2	2.0	2	0
2024	Notre Dame	16	11	43	421	9.8	33	3	0	0	0	0	0
Career		45	25	77	903	11.7	36	5	8	13	1.6	4	1

== Professional career ==
Pre-draft measurables
Height	Weight	Arm length	Hand span	Wingspan	40-yard dash	10-yard split	20-yard split	20-yard shuttle	Three-cone drill	Vertical jump	Broad jump	Bench press
6 ft 5 3/8 in (1.97 m)	258 lb (117 kg)	31 7/8 in (0.81 m)	9 1/2 in (0.24 m)	6 ft 5 in (1.96 m)	4.69 s	1.65 s	2.72 s	4.38 s	7.13 s	33.5 in (0.85 m)	9 ft 10 in (3.00 m)	17 reps
All values from NFL Combine/Pro Day

Evans was selected by the Carolina Panthers in the fifth round, 163rd overall in the 2025 NFL draft.
