= Jarrett Patterson =

American football player (born 1999)

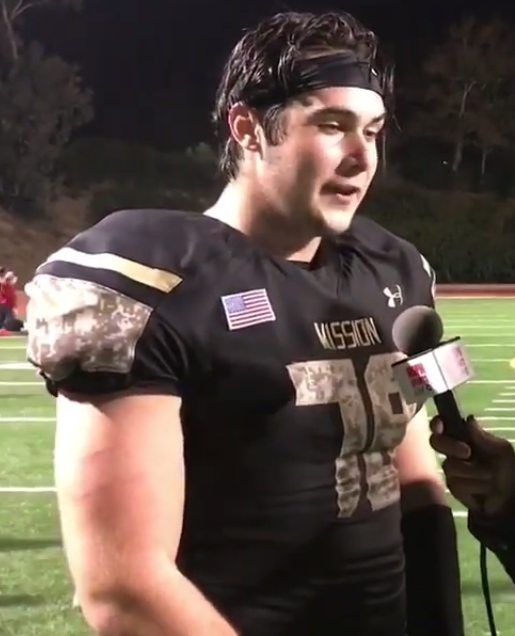
- Patterson with Mission Viejo High School in 2017

No. 58 – San Francisco 49ers
- Position: Center
- Roster status: Active

Personal information
- Born: September 1, 1999 (age 27); Miami, Florida, U.S.
- Listed height: 6 ft 4 in (1.93 m)
- Listed weight: 310 lb (141 kg)

Career information
- High school: Mission Viejo (Mission Viejo, California)
- College: Notre Dame (2018–2022)
- NFL draft: 2023: 6th round, 201st overall pick

Career history
- Houston Texans (2023–2025); San Francisco 49ers (2026–present)

Awards and highlights
- Third-team All-ACC (2020)

Career NFL statistics as of Week 5, 2026
- Games played: 44
- Games started: 21
- Stats at Pro Football Reference

Jarrett Alexander Patterson (born September 1, 1999) is an American professional football center for the San Francisco 49ers of the National Football League (NFL). He played college football for the Notre Dame Fighting Irish.

== Early life ==
Patterson was born in Miami, Florida. He grew up in Laguna Hills, California and attended Mission Viejo High School. He committed to play football at Notre Dame.

== College career ==
In Patterson's collegiate career he played in 48 games, playing 3,099 snaps. In his career he never allowed a sack and only allowed 5 quarterback hits. His best season occurred in 2021 where he played in all 13 games, totalling 918 snaps, 11 quarterback hurries, 1 quarterback hit and no sacks, In 2020 he was named third team all-Atlantic Coast Conference.

== Professional career ==
Pre-draft measurables
Height	Weight	Arm length	Hand span	Wingspan	40-yard dash	10-yard split	20-yard split	20-yard shuttle	Three-cone drill	Vertical jump	Broad jump	Bench press
6 ft 5 1/8 in (1.96 m)	306 lb (139 kg)	31 3/8 in (0.80 m)	10 in (0.25 m)	6 ft 5 in (1.96 m)	5.33 s	1.82 s	3.01 s	4.73 s	7.76 s	29.5 in (0.75 m)	8 ft 10 in (2.69 m)	24 reps
All values from NFL Combine/Pro Day

=== Houston Texans ===
Patterson was selected by the Houston Texans in the sixth round, 201st overall, of the 2023 NFL draft. He was named the Texans' starting center to start his rookie season in 2023. Patterson suffered a fractured fibula in Week 8 and was placed on injured reserve on October 31, 2023.

=== San Francisco 49ers ===
On August 30, 2026, Patterson was traded to the San Francisco 49ers in exchange for a 2027 seventh-round pick.
