= Jayden Thomas =

American football player (born 2002)

Profile
- Position: Wide receiver

Personal information
- Born: October 18, 2002 (age 24); Paulding County, Georgia, U.S.
- Listed height: 6 ft 2 in (1.88 m)
- Listed weight: 220 lb (100 kg)

Career information
- High school: Pace Academy (Atlanta, Georgia)
- College: Notre Dame (2021–2024); Virginia (2025)

Jayden Gerand Phillip Thomas (born October 18, 2002) is an American former college football wide receiver who played for the Notre Dame Fighting Irish and Virginia Cavaliers.

== Early life ==
Thomas attended Pace Academy in Atlanta, Georgia, where he played football and baseball. His football head coach was former NFL Pro Bowler Chris Slade. Thomas committed to play college football at the University of Notre Dame.

== College career ==
As a true freshman, Thomas played in just three games. In his sophomore season, he played in all 13 games, making seven starts at wide receiver while playing on the front line of the kickoff return unit that averaged 19.2 yards per return during the season. He finished third on the team with 25 receptions, and second with 362 receiving yards. In his junior season, against Ohio State, Thomas pulled his hamstring and caught just five passes for 63 yards during the remainder of the season.

=== Statistics ===
Year	Team	GP	Receiving			
Year	Team	GP	Rec	Yds	Avg	TD
2021	Notre Dame	3	0	0	–	0
2022	Notre Dame	13	25	361	14.4	3
2023	Notre Dame	11	21	310	14.8	2
2024	Notre Dame	16	18	167	9.3	2
2025	Virginia	9	3	9	3.0	0
Career		52	67	847	12.6	7

== Personal life ==
Thomas's grandfather, Phillip Rodgers, was the first black quarterback at Virginia Tech.
