= Isaiah Foskey =

American football player (born 2000)

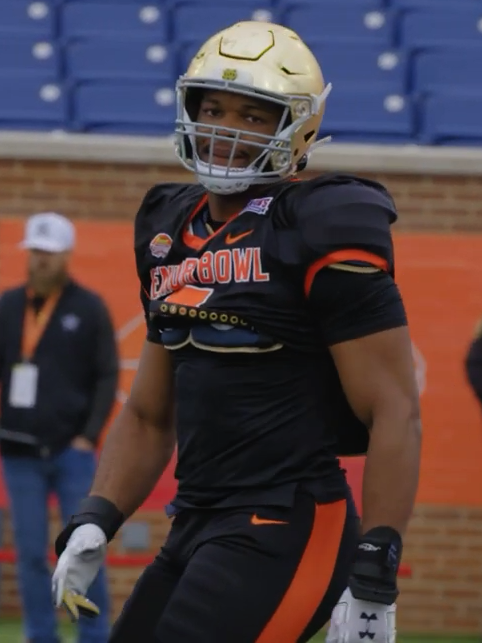
- Foskey at the 2023 Senior Bowl

No. 51 – Cincinnati Bengals
- Position: Defensive end
- Roster status: Practice squad

Personal information
- Born: October 30, 2000 (age 26); Antioch, California, U.S.
- Listed height: 6 ft 5 in (1.96 m)
- Listed weight: 280 lb (127 kg)

Career information
- High school: De La Salle (Concord, California)
- College: Notre Dame (2019–2022)
- NFL draft: 2023: 2nd round, 40th overall pick

Career history
- New Orleans Saints (2023–2024); Cincinnati Bengals (2025–present)

Awards and highlights
- Consensus All-American (2022)

Career NFL statistics as of Week 14, 2025
- Total tackles: 29
- Pass deflections: 1
- Stats at Pro Football Reference

Isaiah Ulysses Foskey (born October 30, 2000) is an American professional football defensive end for the Cincinnati Bengals of the National Football League (NFL). He played college football for the Notre Dame Fighting Irish and was selected by the New Orleans Saints in the second round of the 2023 NFL draft.

== Early life ==
Foskey was born on October 30, 2000, in Antioch, California. He later attended the De La Salle High School in Concord, California, where he played defensive end and tight end on their football team. He played in the 2019 All-American Bowl. Foskey committed to play college football at the University of Notre Dame.

== College career ==
Foskey played in four games his first year at Notre Dame in 2019 and had five tackles and a blocked punt. As a sophomore in 2020, he had 20 tackles and 4.5 sacks. Foskey returned in 2021 as a starter. Foskey finished his college career with totals of 122 tackles, 26.5 sacks, seven forced fumbles, three fumble recoveries, and two pass breakups.

== Professional career ==
Pre-draft measurables
Height	Weight	Arm length	Hand span	Wingspan	40-yard dash	10-yard split	20-yard split	20-yard shuttle	Three-cone drill	Vertical jump	Broad jump	Bench press
6 ft 5 1/8 in (1.96 m)	264 lb (120 kg)	34 in (0.86 m)	9 7/8 in (0.25 m)	6 ft 9 1/4 in (2.06 m)	4.58 s	1.66 s	2.66 s	4.41 s	7.28 s	34.0 in (0.86 m)	10 ft 5 in (3.18 m)	22 reps
All values from NFL Combine

=== New Orleans Saints ===
Foskey was selected by the New Orleans Saints with the 40th overall pick in the second round 2023 NFL draft. As a rookie, he appeared in ten games in the 2023 season.

On August 26, 2025, Foskey was waived by the Saints as part of final roster cuts.

=== Cincinnati Bengals ===
On September 9, 2025, Foskey was signed to the Cincinnati Bengals' practice squad. He was signed to the active roster on November 21. In eight appearances for Cincinnati, Foskey compiled four combined tackles.

On January 5, 2026, the Bengals signed Foskey to a one-year contract extension. On August 30, Foskey was waived by Cincinnati as a part of final roster cuts; he was re-signed to the team's practice squad the next day.

== Career statistics ==
=== NFL ===
Year	Team	Games		Tackles					Interceptions						Fumbles		
Year	Team	GP	GS	Total	Solo	Ast	Sck	Sfty	PD	Int	Yds	Avg	Lng	TD	FF	FR	TD
2023	NO	10	0	9	5	4	0.0	0	1	0	0	0.0	0	0	0	0	0
2024	NO	17	0	16	4	12	0.0	0	0	0	0	0.0	0	0	0	0	0
2025	CIN	8	0	4	2	2	0.0	0	0	0	0	0.0	0	0	0	0	0
Career		35	0	29	11	18	0.0	0	1	0	0	0.0	0	0	0	0	0

=== College ===
Year	Team	Games		Tackles				Interceptions				Fumbles		
Year	Team	GP	GS	Cmb	Solo	Ast	Sck	PD	Int	Yds	TD	FF	FR	TD
2019	Notre Dame	4	0	5	1	4	0.0	0	0	0	0	0	0	0
2020	Notre Dame	12	0	20	12	8	4.5	1	0	0	0	0	0	0
2021	Notre Dame	13	13	52	38	14	11.0	1	0	0	0	6	2	0
2022	Notre Dame	12	12	45	23	22	11.0	0	0	0	0	1	1	0
Career		41	25	122	74	48	26.5	2	0	0	0	7	3	0
