= Chris Tyree =

American football player (born 2001)

Profile
- Position: Wide receiver

Personal information
- Born: December 5, 2001 (age 24); Chester, Virginia, U.S.
- Listed height: 5 ft 10 in (1.78 m)
- Listed weight: 192 lb (87 kg)

Career information
- High school: Thomas Dale (Chester)
- College: Notre Dame (2020–2023); Virginia (2024)
- NFL draft: 2025: undrafted

Career history
- New Orleans Saints (2025)*
- * Offseason or practice squad member only

Christopher Sean Tyree (born December 5, 2001) is an American professional football wide receiver. He played college football for the Notre Dame Fighting Irish and Virginia Cavaliers.

== Early life ==
Tyree grew up in Chester, Virginia and attended Thomas Dale High School. He was rated a five-star recruit by 247Sports and a four-star recruit by Rivals and ESPN and he committed to play college football at Notre Dame over offers from other schools such as Oklahoma, Alabama, Boston College, Florida State, Michigan, Mississippi State, Penn State and South Carolina.

== College career ==
During Tyree's true freshman season in 2020, he appeared in all 12 games at running back and kick returner. He finished the season with 1,017 all-purpose yards (496 rushing, 65 receiving, and 456 kick returns), 6.8 yards per carry, and four touchdowns.

During the 2021 season, he played in 12 games and started two of them. He finished the season with 827 all-purpose yards (222 rushing, 258 receiving and 347 kick returns) and three touchdowns.

During the 2022 season, he played in all 13 games and started six of them. He finished the season with 444 rushing yards and three touchdowns, 24 passes for 138 yards and 15 returning kicks for 254 yards. Prior to the season, he was named on the Doak Walker Award Watchlist.

Prior to the 2023 season, he was named on the Paul Hornung Award Watch List.

=== College statistics ===
Season	Team	Games		Receiving				Rushing				Kick returns				Punt returns			
Season	Team	GP	GS	Rec	Yds	Avg	TD	Att	Yds	Avg	TD	Ret	Yds	Avg	TD	Ret	Yds	Avg	TD
2020	Notre Dame	12	0	8	65	8.1	0	73	496	6.8	4	22	456	20.7	0	—	—	—	—
2021	Notre Dame	12	2	24	258	10.8	2	56	222	4.0	1	13	347	26.7	1	—	—	—	—
2022	Notre Dame	13	6	24	138	5.8	2	100	444	4.4	3	15	254	16.9	0	—	—	—	—
2023	Notre Dame	12	6	26	484	18.6	3	3	–1	–0.3	0	—	—	—	—	11	119	10.8	1
2024	Virginia	10	6	24	136	5.7	0	11	43	3.9	0	12	211	17.6	0	1	11	11.0	0
Career		59	20	106	1,081	10.2	7	243	1,204	5.0	8	62	1,270	20.5	1	12	130	10.8	1

== Professional career ==
Pre-draft measurables
Height	Weight	Arm length	Hand span	40-yard dash	10-yard split	20-yard split	20-yard shuttle	Three-cone drill	Vertical jump	Broad jump	Bench press
5 ft 9 1/8 in (1.76 m)	192 lb (87 kg)	29 1/4 in (0.74 m)	9 in (0.23 m)	4.39 s	1.45 s	2.53 s	4.15 s	6.99 s	42.0 in (1.07 m)	10 ft 7 in (3.23 m)	19 reps
All values from Pro Day

After going undrafted in the 2025 NFL draft, Tyree signed with the New Orleans Saints as an undrafted free agent on April 27, 2025. He was waived/injured by New Orleans on August 10.

On December 16, 2025, Tyree worked out for the Pittsburgh Steelers.
