= Audric Estimé =

American football player (born 2003)

No. 30 – New Orleans Saints
- Position: Running back
- Roster status: Active

Personal information
- Born: September 6, 2003 (age 23); Atlanta, Georgia, U.S.
- Listed height: 5 ft 11 in (1.80 m)
- Listed weight: 227 lb (103 kg)

Career information
- High school: St. Joseph Regional (Montvale, New Jersey)
- College: Notre Dame (2021–2023)
- NFL draft: 2024: 5th round, 147th overall pick

Career history
- Denver Broncos (2024); Philadelphia Eagles (2025)*; New Orleans Saints (2025–2026); Minnesota Vikings (2026)*; Cleveland Browns (2026); New Orleans Saints (2026–present)
- * Offseason or practice squad member only

Career NFL statistics as of Week 9, 2026
- Rushing yards: 599
- Rushing average: 4.1
- Rushing touchdowns: 5
- Receptions: 18
- Receiving yards: 135
- Stats at Pro Football Reference

Audric Estimé (/ˈɛstɪmeɪ/ EH-stih-may; born September 6, 2003) is an American professional football running back for the New Orleans Saints of the National Football League (NFL). He played college football for the Notre Dame Fighting Irish and was selected by the Denver Broncos in the fifth round of the 2024 NFL draft. He has also played for the Cleveland Browns.

== Early life ==
Estimé was born in Atlanta, Georgia and grew up in Nyack, New York. Estimé attended Saint Joseph Regional High School in Montvale, New Jersey. As a senior, he had 1,857 rushing yards and 22 touchdowns and was the NJ.com Football Player of the Year. He originally committed to Michigan State University to play college football before switching to the University of Notre Dame.

== College career ==
Estimé spent his freshman year at Notre Dame in 2021 as a backup to Kyren Williams and had seven rushes for 60 yards.

In 2022, his playing time increased. He finished the regular season with 825 yards on 142 carries with 11 rushing touchdowns. On December 30, 2022, Estimé rushed for 95 yards on 14 carries in Notre Dame’s 45–38 victory in the TaxSlayer Gator Bowl versus South Carolina.

Estimé had 210 carries for 1,341 rushing yards and 18 touchdowns in the 2023 season. His 18 rushing touchdowns set a Notre Dame single-season record.

== Professional career ==
Pre-draft measurables
Height	Weight	Arm length	Hand span	Wingspan	40-yard dash	10-yard split	20-yard split	Vertical jump	Broad jump	Bench press
5 ft 11 3/8 in (1.81 m)	221 lb (100 kg)	32 3/8 in (0.82 m)	10 1/4 in (0.26 m)	6 ft 4 1/2 in (1.94 m)	4.58 s	1.58 s	2.65 s	38.0 in (0.97 m)	10 ft 5 in (3.18 m)	23 reps
All values from NFL Combine/Pro Day

=== Denver Broncos ===
Estimé was drafted in the fifth round with the 147th overall pick by the Denver Broncos in the 2024 NFL draft. He was placed on injured reserve on September 11, 2024. On October 12, he returned to the active roster. In Week 16 against the Los Angeles Chargers, he scored his first NFL touchdown. Prior to the Broncos' wild card matchup against the Buffalo Bills, Estimé was benched and listed as inactive in favor of Tyler Badie, who had recently been activated from injured reserve.

Early in the 2025 offseason, Estimé competed with Badie in addition to Jaleel McLaughlin, Blake Watson, and second-round rookie RJ Harvey. Ahead of training camp, the Broncos also signed veteran running back J. K. Dobbins. By the beginning of the preseason, Estimé was fifth in the rotation. On August 25, 2025, he was waived by the Broncos.

=== Philadelphia Eagles ===
On August 29, 2025, Estimé signed with the Philadelphia Eagles' practice squad. He was released by the Eagles on October 14.

=== New Orleans Saints (first stint) ===
On October 21, 2025, Estimé was signed to the New Orleans Saints' practice squad. On November 5, he was promoted to the active roster. Estimé played his first game of the season on December 7, where he ran for 11 yards from three carries in an upset victory over the Tampa Bay Buccaneers. In a Week 17 win over the Tennessee Titans, he recorded a career-high 94 rushing yards and one touchdown.

On September 12, 2026, Estimé was placed on injured reserve due to a thigh injury. On September 22, Estimé was waived by the Saints with an injury settlement.

=== Minnesota Vikings ===
On September 30, 2026, Estimé signed to the Minnesota Vikings' practice squad.

=== Cleveland Browns ===
On October 13, 2026, Estimé was signed by the Cleveland Browns off the Vikings practice squad. On November 2, he was waived by the Browns.

=== New Orleans Saints (second stint) ===
On November 3, Estimé was claimed off waivers by the New Orleans Saints.

== Career statistics ==
=== NFL ===
Year	Team	Games		Rushing						Receiving					Fumbles	
Year	Team	GP	GS	Att	Yds	Avg	Y/G	Lng	TD	Rec	Yds	Avg	Lng	TD	Fum	Lost
2024	DEN	13	1	76	310	4.1	23.8	21	2	5	27	5.4	13	0	2	1
2025	NO	7	1	46	198	4.3	28.3	32	1	12	103	8.6	19	0	0	0
Career		20	2	122	508	4.2	25.4	32	3	17	130	7.6	19	0	2	1

=== College ===
Year	Team	Games		Rushing				Receiving			
Year	Team	GP	GS	Att	Yds	Avg	TD	Rec	Yds	Avg	TD
2021	Notre Dame	12	0	7	60	8.6	0	0	0	0.0	0
2022	Notre Dame	13	2	156	920	5.9	11	9	135	15.0	1
2023	Notre Dame	12	12	210	1,341	6.4	18	17	142	8.4	0
Career		37	14	373	2,321	6.2	29	26	277	10.7	1

== Personal life ==
Estimé is of Haitian descent. He has one brother, Khadar.

When he was ten years old, Estimé's mother died of sickle cell disease. Estimé and his brother were taken in by their aunt and uncle's family, which included their cousin Terrence Fede, who played in the NFL as a defensive end. Fede acted as a mentor to Estimé over the course of his football career.
