= USA Today All-USA High School Football Team =

Award by USA Today

Each year, American newspaper USA Today awards outstanding high school American football players with a place on its All-USA High School Football Team. The newspaper names athletes that its sports journalists believe to be the best football players from high schools around the United States. The newspaper has named a team every year since 1982.

In addition, two members of the team are named the USA Today High School Offensive Player and Defensive Player of the Year. The newspaper also selects a USA Today High School Football Coach of the Year.

== Teams ==
Note: Bold denotes Offensive and Defensive Players of the Year, respectively, and ^{‡} denotes high school juniors

=== 2010 team ===
See footnotes

- Coach of the Year: Lance Pogue (South Panola High School, Batesville, Mississippi)
- Super 25's Top Team: South Panola High School, Batesville, Mississippi
- Final Super 25 Team Rankings
- Regional Rankings (top 10 in each region: East, South, Midwest, West)

Note: Bold denotes Offensive and Defensive Players of the Year, respectively, and ^{‡} denotes high school juniors

First Team Offense

Player	Position	School	Hometown	College
**Kiehl Frazier**	**Quarterback**	**Shiloh Christian School**	Springdale, Arkansas	Auburn
Savon Huggins	Running back	St. Peter's Preparatory School	Jersey City, New Jersey	Rutgers
Malcolm Brown	Running back	Steele High School	Cibolo, Texas	Texas
Jeremy Hill	Running back	Redemptorist High School	Baton Rouge, Louisiana	LSU
Demetrius Hart	Running back	Dr. Phillips High School	Orlando, Florida	Alabama
Cyrus Kouandjio	Offensive line	DeMatha Catholic High School	Hyattsville, Maryland	Alabama
Christian Westerman	Offensive line	Hamilton High School	Chandler, Arizona	Auburn
Brandon Shell	Offensive line	Goose Creek High School	Charleston, South Carolina	South Carolina
La'el Collins	Offensive line	Redemptorist High School	Baton Rouge, Louisiana	LSU
Zach Banner^{‡}	Offensive line	Lakes High School	Lakewood, Washington	USC
Dorial Green-Beckham^{‡}	Wide receiver	Hillcrest High School	Springfield, Missouri	Missouri
Kasen Williams	Wide receiver	Skyline High School	Sammamish, Washington	Washington
Jace Amaro	Tight end	MacArthur High School	San Antonio, Texas	Texas Tech

First Team Defense

Player	Position	School	Hometown	College
**Jadeveon Clowney**	**Defensive line**	**South Pointe High School**	Rock Hill, South Carolina	South Carolina
Tim Jernigan	Defensive line	Columbia High School	Lake City, Florida	Florida State
Anthony Johnson	Defensive line	O. Perry Walker High School	New Orleans, Louisiana	LSU
Viliami Moala	Defensive line	Grant High School	Sacramento, California	California
Ray Drew	Defensive line	Thomas County Central High School	Thomasville, Georgia	Georgia
Curtis Grant	Linebacker	Hermitage High School	Richmond, Virginia	Ohio State
James Wilder, Jr.	Linebacker	Plant High School	Tampa, Florida	Florida State
Stephone Anthony	Linebacker	Anson High School	Wadesboro, North Carolina	Clemson
Tony Steward	Linebacker	Pedro Menendez High School	St. Augustine, Florida	Clemson
De'Anthony Thomas	Defensive back	Crenshaw High School	Los Angeles, California	Oregon
Ha'Sean Clinton-Dix	Defensive back	Dr. Phillips High School	Orlando, Florida	Alabama
Jordan Phillips	Athlete	Circle High School	Towanda, Kansas	Oklahoma

Second Team Offense

Player	Position	School	Hometown	College
Cody Kessler	Quarterback	Centennial High School	Bakersfield, California	USC
Mike Bellamy	Running back	Charlotte High School	Punta Gorda, Florida	Clemson
Aaron Green	Running back	Madison High School	San Antonio, Texas	Nebraska
Nick O'Leary	Tight end	Dwyer High School	West Palm Beach, Florida	Florida State
Trey Metoyer	Wide receiver	Whitehouse High School	Whitehouse, Texas	Oklahoma
Charone Peake	Wide receiver	Dorman High School	Roebuck, South Carolina	Clemson
Matt Freeman	Offensive line	Cooper High School	Abilene, Texas	Texas State
Ryne Reeves	Offensive line	Crete High School	Crete, Nebraska	Nebraska
Kiaro Holts	Offensive line	Warren Central High School	Indianapolis, Indiana	North Carolina
Brey Cook	Offensive line	Har-Ber High School	Springdale, Arkansas	Arkansas
Michael Bennett	Offensive line	Centerville High School	Centerville, Ohio	Ohio State
Mac McGuire	Placekicker	Carroll High School	Southlake, Texas	Boston University

Second Team Defense

Player	Position	School	Hometown	College
Connor McGovern	Defensive line	Shanley High School	Fargo, North Dakota	Missouri
Kevin McReynolds	Defensive line	St. John's High School	Washington, D.C.	UCLA
Jesse Hayes	Defensive line	Moeller High School	Cincinnati, Ohio	Wisconsin
Kris Harley	Defensive line	Warren Central High School	Indianapolis, Indiana	Virginia Tech
Trey DePriest	Linebacker	Springfield High School	Springfield, Ohio	Alabama
Lawrence Thomas	Linebacker	Renaissance High School	Detroit, Michigan	Michigan State
Tre Madden	Linebacker	Mission Viejo High School	Mission Viejo, California	USC
Derek Watt	Linebacker	Pewaukee High School	Pewaukee, Wisconsin	Wisconsin
Brandon Mullins	Linebacker	Coppell High School	Coppell, Texas	Syracuse
Karlos Williams	Defensive back	Ridge Community High School	Davenport, Florida	Florida State
Doran Grant	Defensive back	St. Vincent – St. Mary High School	Akron, Ohio	Ohio State
Jabriel Washington	Defensive back	Trinity Christian Academy	Jackson, Tennessee	Alabama

=== 2011 team ===
See footnotes

- Coach of the Year: Bob Beatty (Trinity High School, Louisville, Kentucky)
- Super 25's Top Team: Don Bosco Preparatory High School, Ramsey, New Jersey

Note: Bold denotes Offensive and Defensive Players of the Year, respectively, and ^{‡} denotes high school juniors

First Team Offense

Player	Position	School	Hometown	College
**Dorial Green-Beckham**	**Wide receiver**	**Hillcrest High School**	Springfield, Missouri	Missouri
Jameis Winston	Quarterback	Hueytown High School	Hueytown, Alabama	Florida State
Johnathan Gray	Running back	Aledo High School	Aledo, Texas	Texas
Rushel Shell	Running back	Hopewell High School	Aliquippa, Pennsylvania	Pittsburgh
Kelvin Taylor^{‡}	Running back	Glades Day School	Belle Glade, Florida	Florida
D. J. Humphries	Offensive line	Mallard Creek High School	Charlotte, North Carolina	Florida
John Theus	Offensive line	Bolles School	Jacksonville, Florida	Georgia
Andrus Peat	Offensive line	Corona del Sol High School	Tempe, Arizona	Stanford
Zach Banner	Offensive line	Lakes High School	Lakewood, Washington	USC
J. J. Denman	Offensive line	Pennsbury High School	Fairless Hills, Pennsylvania	Rutgers
Jordan Westerkamp	Wide receiver	Montini Catholic High School	Lombard, Illinois	Nebraska
Stefon Diggs	Wide receiver	Good Counsel High School	Olney, Maryland	Maryland
Ross Martin	Kicker	Walsh Jesuit High School	Cuyahoga Falls, Ohio	Duke

First Team Defense

Player	Position	School	Hometown	College
**Mario Edwards Jr.**	**Defensive line**	**Ryan High School**	Denton, Texas	Florida State
Ellis McCarthy	Defensive line	Monrovia High School	Monrovia, California	UCLA
Noah Spence	Defensive line	Bishop McDevitt High School	Harrisburg, Pennsylvania	Ohio State
Tommy Schutt	Defensive line	Glenbard West High School	Glen Ellyn, Illinois	Ohio State
Darius Hamilton	Defensive line	Don Bosco Preparatory High School	Ramsey, New Jersey	Rutgers
Vince Biegel	Linebacker	Lincoln High School	Wisconsin Rapids, Wisconsin	Wisconsin
Scott Starr	Linebacker	Norco High School	Norco, California	USC
Noor Davis	Linebacker	Leesburg High School	Leesburg, Florida	Stanford
Shaq Thompson	Defensive back	Grant Union High School	Sacramento, California	Washington
Landon Collins	Defensive back	Dutchtown High School	Geismar, Louisiana	Alabama
Leon McQuay III^{‡}	Defensive back	Armwood High School	Seffner, Florida	USC
Tracy Howard	Defensive back	Miramar High School	Miramar, Florida	Miami (FL)

Second Team Offense

Player	Position	School	Hometown	College
Gunner Kiel	Quarterback	Columbus East High School	Columbus, Indiana	Notre Dame
Nelson Agholor	Running back	Berkeley Preparatory School	Tampa, Florida	USC
D. J. Foster	Running back	Saguaro High School	Scottsdale, Arizona	Arizona State
Ty Isaac, Jr.^{‡}	Running back	Joliet Catholic High School	Joliet, Illinois	USC
T. J. Yeldon	Running back	Daphne High School	Daphne, Alabama	Alabama
Arik Armstead	Offensive line	Pleasant Grove High School	Elk Grove, California	Oregon
Hiva Lutui	Offensive line	Trinity High School	Euless, Texas	Utah
Jordan Simmons	Offensive line	Crespi High School	Encino, California	USC
Jordan Diamond	Offensive line	Simeon Career Academy	Chicago, Illinois	Auburn
Cayleb Jones	Wide receiver	Austin High School	Austin, Texas	Texas
Shaq Roland	Wide receiver	Lexington High School	Lexington, South Carolina	South Carolina
Bradley Pinion	Placekicker	Northwest Cabarrus High School	Concord, North Carolina	Clemson

Second Team Defense

Player	Position	School	Hometown	College
Eddie Goldman	Defensive line	Friendship Collegiate Charter School	Washington, D.C.	Florida State
Caleb Gulledge	Defensive line	Prattville High School	Prattville, Alabama	Alabama
Robert Nkemdiche^{‡}	Defensive line	Grayson High School	Loganville, Georgia	Ole Miss
Benetton Fonua	Linebacker	Kahuku High School	Kahuku, Hawaii	Hawaii
DeMarkus Lathan^{‡}	Linebacker	Longview High School	Longview, Texas	Tarleton State
Justin Lyles	Linebacker	Phoebus High School	Hampton, Virginia	Concord
Antonio Morrison	Linebacker	Bolingbrook High School	Bolingbrook, Illinois	Florida
Jabari Ruffin	Linebacker	Downey High School	Downey, California	USC
Ronald Darby	Defensive back	Potomac High School	Oxon Hill, Maryland	Florida State
Yuri Wright	Defensive back	Don Bosco Preparatory High School	Ramsey, New Jersey	Colorado
Sal Martinez	Defensive back	Edinburg High School	Edinburg, Texas	UTSA

=== 2012 team ===
See footnotes

- Coach of the Year: J. T. Curtis (John Curtis Christian High School, River Ridge, Louisiana)
- Super 25's Top Team: John Curtis Christian High School, River Ridge, Louisiana

Note: Bold denotes Offensive and Defensive Players of the Year, respectively, and ^{‡} and ^{‡‡} denotes high school juniors and sophomores, respectively

First Team Offense

Player	Position	School	Hometown	College
**Max Browne**	**Quarterback**	**Skyline High School**	Sammamish, Washington	USC
Thomas Tyner	Running back	Aloha High School	Aloha, Oregon	Oregon
Derrick Henry	Running back	Yulee High School	Yulee, Florida	Alabama
Robert Foster	Wide receiver	Central Valley High School	Monaca, Pennsylvania	Alabama
Laquon Treadwell	Wide receiver	Crete-Monee High School	Crete, Illinois	Ole Miss
Hunter Henry	Tight end	Pulaski Academy	Little Rock, Arkansas	Arkansas
Evan Lisle	Offensive line	Centerville High School	Centerville, Ohio	Ohio State
Ethan Pocic	Offensive line	Lemont High School	Lemont, Illinois	LSU
Grant Hill	Offensive line	Huntsville High School	Huntsville, Alabama	Alabama
Kent Perkins	Offensive line	Lake Highlands High School	Dallas, Texas	Texas
Laremy Tunsil	Offensive line	Columbia High School	Lake City, Florida	Ole Miss
Matt Wogan	Kicker	Porter Ridge High School	Indian Trail, North Carolina	Oregon

First Team Defense

Player	Position	School	Hometown	College
**Su'a Cravens**	**Defensive back**	**Vista Murrieta High School**	Murrieta, California	USC
Jabrill Peppers^{‡}	Defensive back	Paramus Catholic High School	Paramus, New Jersey	Michigan
Marlon Humphrey^{‡}	Defensive back	Hoover High School	Hoover, Alabama	Alabama
Vernon Hargreaves III	Defensive back	Wharton High School	Tampa, Florida	Florida
Reuben Foster	Linebacker	Auburn High School	Auburn, Alabama	Alabama
Peter Kalambayi	Linebacker	Butler High School	Matthews, North Carolina	Stanford
Jaylon Smith	Linebacker	Bishop Luers High School	Fort Wayne, Indiana	Notre Dame
Andrew Brown^{‡}	Defensive line	Oscar Smith High School	Chesapeake, Virginia	Virginia
Montravius Adams	Defensive line	Dooly County High School	Vienna, Georgia	Auburn
Robert Nkemdiche	Defensive line	Grayson High School	Loganville, Georgia	Ole Miss
Dee Liner	Defensive line	Muscle Shoals High School	Muscle Shoals, Alabama	Alabama
Henry Poggi	Defensive line	Gilman School	Baltimore, Maryland	Michigan

Second Team Offense

Player	Position	School	Hometown	College
Austin Kafentzis^{‡‡}	Quarterback	Jordan High School	Sandy, Utah	Wisconsin
Greg Bryant	Running back	American Heritage School	Delray Beach, Florida	Notre Dame
Derrick Green	Running back	Hermitage High School	Richmond, Virginia	Michigan
Kelvin Taylor	Running back	Glades Day School	Belle Glade, Florida	Florida
LaQuvionte Gonzalez	Running back	Cedar Hill High School	Cedar Hill, Texas	Texas A&M
Leonard Fournette^{‡}	Running back	St. Augustine High School	New Orleans, Louisiana	LSU
Tramel Terry	Wide receiver	Goose Creek High School	Goose Creek, South Carolina	Georgia
Jalen Brown^{‡}	Wide receiver	Mountain Pointe High School	Phoenix, Arizona	Oregon
Kyle Bosch	Offensive line	St. Francis High School	Wheaton, Illinois	Michigan
Cameron Hunt	Offensive line	Centennial High School	Corona, California	California
Thomas Duarte	Tight end	Mater Dei High School	Santa Ana, California	UCLA
Austin Rehkow	Placekicker	Central Valley High School	Spokane Valley, Washington	Idaho

Second Team Defense

Player	Position	School	Hometown	College
Jonathan Allen	Defensive line	Stone Bridge High School	Ashburn, Virginia	Alabama
Da'Shawn Hand^{‡}	Defensive line	Woodbridge High School	Woodbridge, Virginia	Alabama
Tim Williams^{‡}	Defensive line	Louisiana State University Lab School	Baton Rouge, Louisiana	Alabama
Joey Bosa	Defensive line	St. Thomas Aquinas High School	Fort Lauderdale, Florida	Ohio State
A'Shawn Robinson	Defensive line	Arlington Heights High School	Fort Worth, Texas	Alabama
Eddie Vanderdoes	Defensive line	Placer High School	Placer, California	Notre Dame
Michael Hutchings	Linebacker	De La Salle High School	Concord, California	USC
Mark Fossati^{‡}	Linebacker	St. Joseph High School	Montvale, New Jersey	Princeton
Raekwon McMillan^{‡}	Linebacker	Liberty County High School	Hinesville, Georgia	Ohio State
Max Redfield	Defensive back	Mission Viejo High School	Mission Viejo, California	Notre Dame
Leon McQuay III	Defensive back	Armwood High School	Seffner, Florida	USC
Tony Brown^{‡}	Defensive back	Ozen High School	Beaumont, Texas	Alabama

=== 2013 team ===
See footnotes

- Coach of the Year: Al Fracassa (Brother Rice High School, Bloomfield Hills, Michigan)
- Super 25's Top Team: Booker T. Washington High School, Miami, Florida

Note: Bold denotes Offensive and Defensive Players of the Year, respectively, and ^{‡} denotes high school juniors

First Team Offense

Player	Position	School	Hometown	College
**Leonard Fournette**	**Running back**	**St. Augustine High School**	New Orleans, Louisiana	LSU
Kyler Murray^{‡}	Quarterback	Allen High School	Allen, Texas	Texas A&M
Dalvin Cook	Running back	Miami Central High School	Miami, Florida	Florida State
Sony Michel	Running back	American Heritage School	Plantation, Florida	Georgia
Malachi Dupre	Wide receiver	John Curtis Christian High School	River Ridge, Louisiana	LSU
Allen Lazard	Wide receiver	Urbandale High School	Urbandale, Iowa	Iowa State
Trey Quinn	Wide receiver	Barbe High School	Lake Charles, Louisiana	LSU
Damien Mama	Offensive line	St. John Bosco High School	Bellflower, California	USC
Damian Prince	Offensive line	Bishop McNamara High School	Forestville, Maryland	Maryland
Cameron Robinson	Offensive line	West Monroe High School	West Monroe, Louisiana	Alabama
Braden Smith	Offensive line	Olathe South High School	Olathe, Kansas	Auburn
Cole Hedlund	Kicker	Argyle High School	Argyle, Texas	Arkansas

First Team Defense

Player	Position	School	Hometown	College
**Jabrill Peppers**	**Defensive back**	**Paramus Catholic High School**	Paramus, New Jersey	Michigan
Marlon Humphrey	Defensive back	Hoover High School	Hoover, Alabama	Alabama
Adoree' Jackson	Defensive back	Serra High School	Gardena, California	USC
Steven Parker	Defensive back	Jenks High School	Jenks, Oklahoma	Oklahoma
Dante Booker, Jr.	Linebacker	St. Vincent-St. Mary High School	Akron, Ohio	Ohio State
Raekwon McMillan	Linebacker	Liberty County High School	Hinesville, Georgia	Ohio State
Nyles Morgan	Linebacker	Crete-Monee High School	Crete, Illinois	Notre Dame
Tre Williams	Linebacker	St. Paul's Episcopal School	Mobile, Alabama	Auburn
Andrew Brown	Defensive line	Oscar Smith High School	Chesapeake, Virginia	Virginia
Lorenzo Carter	Defensive line	Norcross High School	Norcross, Georgia	Georgia
Da'Shawn Hand	Defensive line	Woodbridge High School	Woodbridge, Virginia	Alabama
Gerald Willis	Defensive line	Karr High School	New Orleans, Louisiana	Florida

Second Team Offense

Player	Position	School	Hometown	College
Deshaun Watson	Quarterback	Gainesville High School	Gainesville, Georgia	Clemson
Elijah Hood	Running back	Charlotte Catholic High School	Charlotte, North Carolina	North Carolina
Joe Mixon	Running back	Freedom High School	Oakley, California	Oklahoma
Racean Thomas	Running back	Oxford High School	Oxford, Alabama	Auburn
K. D. Cannon	Wide receiver	Mount Pleasant High School	Mount Pleasant, Texas	Baylor
Alex Bars	Offensive line	Montgomery Bell Academy	Nashville, Tennessee	Notre Dame
Orlando Brown Jr.	Offensive line	Peachtree Ridge High School	Suwanee, Georgia	Oklahoma
Garrett Brumfield	Offensive line	Louisiana State University Lab School	Baton Rouge, Louisiana	LSU
Demetrius Knox	Offensive line	All Saint's Episcopal Day School\	Fort Worth, Texas	Ohio State
K. C. McDermott	Offensive line	Palm Beach Central High School	Wellington, Florida	Miami (FL)
Quenton Nelson	Offensive line	Red Bank Catholic High School	Red Bank, New Jersey	Notre Dame
Gary Wunderlich	Placekicker	Memphis University School	Memphis, Tennessee	Ole Miss

Second Team Defense

Player	Position	School	Hometown	College
Demarcus Christmas	Defensive line	Manatee High School	Bradenton, Florida	Florida State
Matt Dickerson	Defensive line	Serra High School	San Mateo, California	Notre Dame
Matt Elam	Defensive line	John Hardin High School	Elizabethtown, Kentucky	Kentucky
Connor Humphreys	Defensive line	Central Catholic High School	Portland, Oregon	Arizona State
Chad Thomas	Defensive line	Booker T. Washington High School	Miami, Florida	Miami (FL)
Solomon Thomas	Defensive line	Coppell High School	Coppell, Texas	Stanford
Dillon Bates	Linebacker	Ponte Vedra High School	Ponte Vedra, Florida	Tennessee
Jamardre Cobb	Linebacker	Salesian High School	Los Angeles, California	Arizona
Christian Miller	Linebacker	Spring Valley High School	Columbia, South Carolina	Alabama
Kenny Young	Linebacker	John Curtis Christian High School	River Ridge, Louisiana	UCLA
Quin Blanding	Defensive back	Bayside High School	Virginia Beach, Virginia	Virginia
Tony Brown	Defensive back	Ozen High School	Beaumont, Texas	Alabama

=== 2014 team ===
See footnotes

- Coach of the Year: Tony Sanchez (Bishop Gorman High School, Las Vegas, Nevada)
- Super 25's Top Team: Bishop Gorman High School, Las Vegas, Nevada

Note: Bold denotes Offensive and Defensive Players of the Year, respectively, and ^{‡} denotes high school juniors

First Team Offense

Player	Position	School	Hometown	College
**Kyler Murray**	**Quarterback**	**Allen High School**	Allen, Texas	Texas A&M
Josh Rosen	Quarterback	St. John Bosco High School	Bellflower, California	UCLA
Jake Browning	Quarterback	Folsom High School	Folsom, California	Washington
Soso Jamabo	Running back	Plano West High School	Plano, Texas	UCLA
Damien Harris	Running back	Madison Southern High School	Berea, Kentucky	Alabama
Alizé Jones	Tight end	Bishop Gorman High School	Las Vegas, Nevada	Notre Dame
DaMarkus Lodge	Wide receiver	Cedar Hill High School	Cedar Hill, Texas	Ole Miss
Tyron Johnson	Wide receiver	Warren Easton High School	New Orleans, Louisiana	LSU
Tristen Hoge	Offensive line	Highland High School	Pocatello, Idaho	Notre Dame
Martez Ivey	Offensive line	Apopka High School	Apopka, Florida	Florida
Mitch Hyatt	Offensive line	North Gwinnett High School	Suwanee, Georgia	Clemson
Maea Teuhema	Offensive line	Keller High School	Keller, Texas	LSU

First Team Defense

Player	Position	School	Hometown	College
**Trenton Thompson**	**Defensive line**	**Westover High School**	Albany, Georgia	Georgia
Byron Cowart	Defensive line	Armwood High School	Seffner, Florida	Auburn
Terry Beckner, Jr.	Defensive line	East St. Louis High School	East St. Louis, Illinois	Missouri
Rasheem Green	Defensive line	Junípero Serra High School	Gardena, California	USC
Malik Jefferson	Linebacker	Poteet High School	Mesquite, Texas	Texas
Justin Hilliard	Linebacker	St. Xavier High School	Cincinnati, Ohio	Ohio State
Leo Lewis	Linebacker	Brookhaven High School	Brookhaven, Mississippi	Mississippi State
Iman Marshall	Defensive back	Polytechnic High School	Long Beach, California	USC
Kevin Toliver II	Defensive back	Trinity Christian Academy	Jacksonville, Florida	LSU
Kendall Sheffield	Defensive back	Marshall High School	Missouri City, Texas	Alabama
Terry Godwin	Defensive back	Callaway High School	Hogansville, Georgia	Georgia
Kevin Robledo	Kicker/Punter	Westlake High School	Westlake Village, California	Florida State

Second Team Offense

Player	Position	School	Hometown	College
Tate Martell^{‡‡}	Quarterback	Bishop Gorman High School	Las Vegas, Nevada	Ohio State
Ben DiNucci	Quarterback	Pine-Richland High School	Gibsonia, Pennsylvania	Pittsburgh
Ke'Shawn Vaughn	Running back	Pearl-Cohn High School	Nashville, Tennessee	Illinois
Jacques Patrick	Running back	Timber Creek High School	Orlando, Florida	Florida State
Sihiem King	Running back	Colquitt County High School	Moultrie, Georgia	Kentucky
Christian Kirk	Wide receiver	Saguaro High School	Scottsdale, Arizona	Texas A&M
Deon Cain	Wide receiver	Tampa Bay Tech High School	Tampa, Florida	Clemson
George Campbell	Wide receiver	East Lake High School	Tarpon Springs, Florida	Florida State
Tommy Kraemer^{‡}	Offensive line	Elder High School	Cincinnati, Ohio	Notre Dame
Greg Little^{‡}	Offensive line	Allen High School	Allen, Texas	Ole Miss
Chuma Edoga	Offensive line	McEachern High School	Powder Springs, Georgia	USC
Michael Tarbutt	Placekicker	Canisius High School	Buffalo, New York	Connecticut

Second Team Defense

Player	Position	School	Hometown	College
Natrez Patrick	Defensive line	Mays High School	Atlanta, Georgia	Georgia
Joseph Wicker	Defensive line	Polytechnic High School	Long Beach, California	Arizona State
Shy Tuttle	Defensive line	North Davidson High School	Lexington, North Carolina	Tennessee
Joe Gaziano	Defensive line	Xaverian Brothers High School	Westwood, Massachusetts	Northwestern
Thomas Hutchings	Linebacker	Cedar Park High School	Cedar Park, Texas	Stephen F. Austin
Sam Kuschnick	Linebacker	Silverton High School	Silverton, Oregon	Oregon State
John Houston	Linebacker	Junípero Serra High School	Gardena, California	USC
Porter Gustin	Linebacker	Salem Hills High School	Salem, Utah	USC
Kerryon Johnson	Defensive back	Madison Academy	Madison, Alabama	Auburn
Niko Small	Defensive back	Bowie High School	Arlington, Texas	TCU
Derwin James	Defensive back	Haines City High School	Haines City, Florida	Florida State
Minkah Fitzpatrick	Defensive back	St. Peter's Preparatory School	Jersey City, New Jersey	Alabama

=== 2015 team ===
See footnotes

- Coach of the Year: Matt Logan (Centennial High School, Corona, California)
- Super 25's Top Team: Bishop Gorman High School, Las Vegas, Nevada

Note: Bold denotes Offensive and Defensive Players of the Year, respectively, and ^{‡} denotes high school juniors

First Team Offense

Player	Position	School	Hometown	College
**Jacob Eason**	**Quarterback**	**Lake Stevens High School**	Lake Stevens, Washington	Georgia
Drake Davis	All-purpose back	IMG Academy	Bradenton, Florida	LSU
Sean McGrew	Running back	St. John Bosco High School	Bellflower, California	Washington
Tavien Feaster	Running back	Spartanburg High School	Spartanburg, South Carolina	Clemson
Najee Harris^{‡}	Running back	Antioch High School	Antioch, California	Alabama
Nate Craig-Myers	Wide receiver	Tampa Catholic High School	Tampa, Florida	Auburn
Donnie Corley	Wide receiver	Martin Luther King High School	Detroit, Michigan	Michigan State
Isaac Nauta	Tight end	IMG Academy	Bradenton, Florida	Georgia
Greg Little	Offensive line	Allen High School	Allen, Texas	Ole Miss
Ben Bredeson	Offensive line	Arrowhead High School	Hartland, Wisconsin	Michigan
Tommy Kraemer	Offensive line	Elder High School	Cincinnati, Ohio	Notre Dame
Quinn Nordin	Placekicker	Rockford High School	Rockford, Michigan	Michigan

First Team Defense

Player	Position	School	Hometown	College
**Rashan Gary**	**Defensive line**	**Paramus Catholic High School**	Paramus, New Jersey	Michigan
Dexter Lawrence	Defensive line	Wake Forest High School	Wake Forest, North Carolina	Clemson
Derrick Brown	Defensive line	Lanier High School	Sugar Hill, Georgia	Auburn
Marlon Davidson	Defensive line	Greenville High School	Greenville, Alabama	Auburn
Mique Juarez	Linebacker	North High School	Torrance, California	UCLA
Lyndell Wilson	Linebacker	Carver High School	Montgomery, Alabama	Alabama
Ben Davis	Linebacker	Gordo High School	Gordo, Alabama	Alabama
Caleb Kelly	Linebacker	Clovis West High School	Fresno, California	Oklahoma
Levonta Taylor	Defensive back	Ocean Lakes High School	Virginia Beach, Virginia	Florida State
Shaun Wade^{‡}	Defensive back	Trinity Christian Academy	Jacksonville, Florida	Ohio State
Saivion Smith	Defensive back	IMG Academy	Bradenton, Florida	LSU
Drue Chrisman	Kicker/Punter	La Salle High School	Cincinnati, Ohio	Ohio State

Second Team Offense

Player	Position	School	Hometown	College
Shea Patterson	Quarterback	IMG Academy	Bradenton, Florida	Ole Miss
Cecil Langston	Running back	Rivercrest High School	Wilson, Arkansas	Henderson State
DeShawn Smith	Running back	Nature Coast High School	Brooksville, Florida	Savannah State
Ty Chandler^{‡}	Running back	Montgomery Bell Academy	Nashville, Tennessee	Tennessee
Dillon Mitchell	Wide receiver	White Station High School	Memphis, Tennessee	Oregon
Simi Fehoko	Wide receiver	Brighton High School	Cottonwood Heights, Utah	Stanford
Naseir Upshur	Tight end	Imhotep Charter High School	Philadelphia, Pennsylvania	Florida State
Erik Swenson	Offensive line	Downers Grove South High School	Downers Grove, Illinois	Oklahoma
Michael Jordan	Offensive line	Plymouth High School	Canton Township, Michigan	Ohio State
Jonah Williams	Offensive line	Folsom High School	Folsom, California	Alabama
Terrance Davis	Offensive line	DeMatha High School	Hyattsville, Maryland	Maryland
Connor Culp	Placekicker	Desert Vista High School	Phoenix, Arizona	LSU

Second Team Defense

Player	Position	School	Hometown	College
McTelvin Agim	Defensive line	Hope High School	Hope, Arkansas	Arkansas
Marvin Wilson^{‡}	Defensive line	Episcopal High School	Bellaire, Texas	Florida State
Julian Rochester	Defensive line	McEachern High School	Powder Springs, Georgia	Georgia
Ed Oliver	Defensive line	Westfield High School	Houston, Texas	Houston
Shane Simmons	Linebacker	DeMatha Catholic High School	Hyattsville, Maryland	Penn State
Rahshaun Smith	Linebacker	IMG Academy	Bradenton, Florida	Clemson
Keandre Jones	Linebacker	Good Counsel High School	Olney, Maryland	Ohio State
Brandon Jones	Defensive back	Nacogdoches High School	Nacogdoches, Texas	Texas
Mecole Hardman	Defensive back	Elbert County High School	Elberton, Georgia	Georgia
Nigel Warrior	Defensive back	Peachtree Ridge High School	Suwanee, Georgia	Tennessee
Trayvon Mullen	Defensive back	Coconut Creek High School	Coconut Creek, Florida	Clemson
Logan Tyler	Punter	Nixa High School	Nixa, Missouri	Florida State

=== 2016 team ===
See footnotes

- Coach of the Year: Kevin Kelley (Pulaski Academy, Little Rock, Arkansas)

Note: Bold denotes Offensive and Defensive Players of the Year, respectively, and ^{‡} denotes high school juniors

First Team Offense

Player	Position	School	Hometown	College
**Tate Martell**	**Quarterback**	**Bishop Gorman High School**	Las Vegas, Nevada	Ohio State
Cam Akers	Quarterback	Clinton High School	Clinton, Mississippi	Florida State
D'Andre Swift	Running back	Saint Joseph's Preparatory School	Philadelphia, Pennsylvania	Georgia
Najee Harris	Running back	Antioch High School	Antioch, California	Alabama
Donovan Peoples-Jones	Wide receiver	Cass Tech High School	Detroit, Michigan	Michigan
Jeff Thomas	Wide receiver	East St. Louis High School	St. Louis, Missouri	Miami
Foster Sarell	Offensive line	Graham-Kapowsin High School	Graham, Washington	Stanford
Trey Smith	Offensive line	University School of Jackson	Jackson, Tennessee	Tennessee
Calvin Ashley	Offensive line	St. John's College High School	Washington, D.C.	Auburn
Wyatt Davis	Offensive line	St. John Bosco High School	Bellflower, California	Ohio State
Josh Myers	Offensive line	Miamisburg High School	Miamisburg, Ohio	Ohio State
Blake Haubeil	Placekicker	Canisius High School	Buffalo, New York	Ohio State

First Team Defense

Player	Position	School	Hometown	College
**Shaun Wade**	**Defensive back**	**Trinity Christian Academy**	Jacksonville, Florida	Ohio State
Jaelan Phillips	Defensive line	Redlands East Valley High School	Redlands, California	UCLA
Marvin Wilson	Defensive line	Episcopal High School	Bellaire, Texas	Florida State
Joshua Kaindoh	Defensive line	IMG Academy	Bradenton, Florida	Florida State
Anthony Hines III	Linebacker	Plano East Senior High School	Plano, Texas	Texas A&M
Nate McBride	Linebacker	Vidalia Comprehensive High School	Vidalia, Georgia	Georgia
Dylan Moses	Linebacker	IMG Academy	Bradenton, Florida	Alabama
Jeff Okudah	Defensive back	South Grand Prairie High School	Grand Prairie, Texas	Ohio State
Bubba Bolden	Defensive back	Bishop Gorman High School	Las Vegas, Nevada	USC
Richard LeCounte	Defensive back	Liberty County High School	Hinesville, Georgia	Georgia
JaCoby Stevens	Defensive back	Oakland High School	Murfreesboro, Tennessee	LSU
Pressley Harvin III	Kicker/Punter	Sumter High School	Sumter, South Carolina	Georgia Tech

Second Team Offense

Player	Position	School	Hometown	College
Jake Fromm	Quarterback	Warner Robins High School	Warner Robins, Georgia	Georgia
Eno Benjamin	Running back	Wylie East High School	Wylie, Texas	Arizona State
Ty Chandler	Running back	Montgomery Bell Academy	Nashville, Tennessee	Tennessee
Khalan Laborn	Running back	Bishop Sullivan Catholic High School	Virginia Beach, Virginia	Florida State
Tee Higgins	Wide receiver	Oak Ridge High School	Oak Ridge, Tennessee	Clemson
Jerry Jeudy	Wide receiver	Deerfield Beach High School	Deerfield Beach, Florida	Alabama
Colby Parkinson	Tight end	Oaks Christian High School	Westlake Village, California	Stanford
Austin Jackson	Offensive line	North Canyon High School	Phoenix, Arizona	USC
Walker Little	Offensive line	Episcopal High School	Bellaire, Texas	Stanford
Alex Leatherwood	Offensive line	Booker T. Washington High School	Pensacola, Florida	Alabama
Isaiah Wilson	Offensive line	Poly Prep Country Day School	Brooklyn, New York	Georgia
Brandon Ruiz	Placekicker	Williams Field High School	Gilbert, Arizona	Alabama

Second Team Defense

Player	Position	School	Hometown	College
A. J. Epenesa	Defensive line	Edwardsville High School	Edwardsville, Illinois	Iowa
Tavis Lee^{‡}	Defensive line	Martinsburg High School	Martinsburg, West Virginia	West Virginia
Aubrey Solomon	Defensive line	Lee County High School	Leesburg, Georgia	Michigan
Xavier Thomas^{‡}	Defensive line	Wilson High School	Florence, South Carolina	Clemson
Louis Acceus	Linebacker	St. Joseph Regional High School	Montvale, New Jersey	NC State
Baron Browning	Linebacker	Kennedale High School	Kennedale, Texas	Ohio State
Willie Gay	Linebacker	Starkville High School	Starkville, Mississippi	Mississippi State
Matt Lorbeck	Linebacker	Bay Port High School	Green Bay, Wisconsin	Northern Illinois
Chase Young	Linebacker	DeMatha High School	Hyattsville, Maryland	Ohio State
Darnay Holmes	Defensive back	Calabasas High School	Calabasas, California	UCLA
Patrick Surtain II^{‡}	Defensive back	American Heritage School	Plantation, Florida	Alabama
Trevor Denbow	Punter	Corsicana High School	Corsicana, Texas	SMU

=== 2017 team ===
See footnotes

- Coach of the Year: Bruce Rollinson (Mater Dei High School, Santa Ana, California)

Note: Bold denotes Offensive and Defensive Players of the Year, respectively, and ^{‡} denotes high school juniors

First Team Offense

Player	Position	School	Hometown	College
**Trevor Lawrence**	**Quarterback**	**Cartersville High School**	Cartersville, Georgia	Clemson
J. T. Daniels	Quarterback	Mater Dei High School	Santa Ana, California	USC
Lorenzo Lingard	Running back	University High School	Orange City, Florida	Miami (FL)
Zamir White	Running back	Scotland County High School	Laurinburg, North Carolina	Georgia
Amon-Ra St. Brown	Wide receiver	Mater Dei High School	Santa Ana, California	USC
Jackson Carman	Offensive line	Fairfield High School	Fairfield, Ohio	Clemson
Devontae Dobbs^{‡}	Offensive line	Belleville High School	Belleville, Michigan	Michigan State
Cade Mays	Offensive line	Knoxville Catholic High School	Knoxville, Tennessee	Georgia
Jamaree Salyer	Offensive line	Pace Academy	Atlanta, Georgia	Georgia
Brey Walker	Offensive line	Westmoore High School	Moore, Oklahoma	Oklahoma
Jeremy Ruckert	Tight end	Lindenhurst High School	Lindenhurst, New York	Ohio State
Ryan Fitzgerald^{‡}	Placekicker	Colquitt County High School	Moultrie, Georgia	Florida State

First Team Defense

Player	Position	School	Hometown	College
**Solomon Tuliaupupu**	**Linebacker**	**Mater Dei High School**	Santa Ana, California	USC
Nik Bonitto	Defensive line	St. Thomas Aquinas High School	Fort Lauderdale, Florida	Oklahoma
Nesta Silvera	Defensive line	American Heritage School	Plantation, Florida	Miami (FL)
Xavier Thomas	Defensive line	IMG Academy	Bradenton, Florida	Clemson
Taron Vincent	Defensive line	IMG Academy	Bradenton, Florida	Ohio State
Matthew Bauer	Linebacker	Cathedral Preparatory School	Erie, Pennsylvania	Notre Dame
Teradja Mitchell	Linebacker	Bishop Sullivan Catholic High School	Virginia Beach, Virginia	Ohio State
Channing Tindall	Linebacker	Spring Valley High School	Columbia, South Carolina	Georgia
Akeem Dent^{‡}	Defensive back	Palm Beach Central High School	Wellington, Florida	Florida State
A. J. Lytton	Defensive back	Wise High School	Upper Marlboro, Maryland	Florida State
Isaac Taylor-Stuart	Defensive back	Helix High School	La Mesa, California	USC
Brian Williams^{‡}	Defensive back	Bishop Dunne Catholic School	Dallas, Texas	Texas A&M

Second Team Offense

Player	Position	School	Hometown	College
Phil Jurkovec	Quarterback	Pine-Richland High School	Gibsonia, Pennsylvania	Notre Dame
Tony Brown	Running back	East Central High School	Moss Point, Mississippi	South Alabama
Eric Gray^{‡}	Running back	Lausanne Collegiate School	Memphis, Tennessee	Tennessee
Ricky Slade Jr.	Running back	Hylton High School	Woodbridge, Virginia	Penn State
Rondale Moore	Wide receiver	Trinity High School	Louisville, Kentucky	Purdue
Justin Shorter	Wide receiver	South Brunswick High School	Monmouth Junction, New Jersey	Penn State
Emil Ekiyor Jr.	Offensive line	Cathedral High School	Indianapolis, Indiana	Alabama
Trey Hill	Offensive line	Houston County High School	Warner Robins, Georgia	Georgia
Nicholas Petit-Frere	Offensive line	Berkeley Preparatory School	Tampa, Florida	Ohio State
Rasheed Walker	Offensive line	North Point High School	Waldorf, Maryland	Penn State
Brevin Jordan	Tight end	Bishop Gorman High School	Las Vegas, Nevada	Miami (FL)
Seth Small	Placekicker	Katy High School	Katy, Texas	Texas A&M

Second Team Defense

Player	Position	School	Hometown	College
Eyabi Anoma	Defensive line	St. Frances Academy	Baltimore, Maryland	Alabama
KJ Henry	Defensive line	West Forsyth High School	Clemmons, North Carolina	Clemson
Micah Parsons	Defensive line	Harrisburg High School	Harrisburg, Pennsylvania	Penn State
Nolan Smith^{‡}	Defensive line	IMG Academy	Bradenton, Florida	Georgia
Kayvon Thibodeaux^{‡}	Defensive line	Oaks Christian High School	Westlake Village, California	Oregon
Bo Calvert	Linebacker	Oaks Christian High School	Westlake Village, California	UCLA
Palaie Gaoteote	Linebacker	Bishop Gorman High School	Las Vegas, Nevada	USC
Owen Pappoe^{‡}	Linebacker	Grayson High School	Loganville, Georgia	Auburn
Drake Thomas^{‡}	Linebacker	Heritage High School	Wake Forest, North Carolina	NC State
Anthony Cook	Defensive back	Lamar High School	Houston, Texas	Texas
Patrick Surtain II	Defensive back	American Heritage School	Plantation, Florida	Alabama
Logan Taylor	Defensive back	Narbonne High School	Harbor City, California	Hawaii

=== 2018 team ===
See footnotes

- Coach of the Year: Randy Trivers (Gonzaga College High School, Washington, D.C.)

Note: Bold denotes Offensive and Defensive Players of the Year, respectively, and ^{‡} denotes high school juniors

First Team Offense

Player	Position	School	Hometown	College
**DJ Uiagalelei**^{‡}	**Quarterback**	**St. John Bosco High School**	Bellflower, California	Clemson
Bo Nix	Quarterback	Pinson Valley High School	Pinson, Alabama	Auburn
Zach Evans^{‡}	Running back	North Shore High School	Houston, Texas	TCU
Eric Gray	Running back	Lausanne Collegiate School	Memphis, Tennessee	Tennessee
Jamious Griffin	Running back	Rome High School	Rome, Georgia	Georgia Tech
David Bell	Wide receiver	Warren Central High School	Indianapolis, Indiana	Purdue
Puka Nacua	Wide receiver	Orem High School	Orem, Utah	Washington
Bru McCoy	Wide receiver	Mater Dei High School	Santa Ana, California	USC
Garrett Wilson	Wide receiver	Lake Travis High School	Austin, Texas	Ohio State
Hudson Henry	Tight end	Pulaski Academy	Little Rock, Arkansas	Arkansas
Logan Brown	Offensive line	East Kentwood High School	Kentwood, Michigan	Wisconsin
Kardell Thomas	Offensive line	Southern University Lab High School	New Orleans, Louisiana	LSU
Clay Webb	Offensive line	Oxford High School	Oxford, Alabama	Georgia
Darnell Wright	Offensive line	Huntington High School	Huntington, West Virginia	Tennessee
Ryan Fitzgerald	Placekicker	Colquitt County High School	Moultrie, Georgia	Florida State

First Team Defense

Player	Position	School	Hometown	College
**Kayvon Thibodeaux**	**Defensive line**	**Oaks Christian High School**	Westlake Village, California	Oregon
Bryan Bresee^{‡}	Defensive line	Damascus High School	Damascus, Maryland	Clemson
George Karlaftis	Defensive line	West Lafayette High School	West Lafayette, Indiana	Purdue
Siaki Ika	Defensive line	East High School	Salt Lake City, Utah	LSU
Nolan Smith	Defensive line	IMG Academy	Bradenton, Florida	Georgia
Ishmael Sopsher	Defensive line	Amite High Magnet School	Amite City, Louisiana	Alabama
Nakobe Dean	Linebacker	Horn Lake High School	Horn Lake, Mississippi	Georgia
Justin Flowe^{‡}	Linebacker	Upland High School	Upland, California	Oregon
Brandon Smith	Linebacker	Louisa County High School	Mineral, Virginia	Penn State
Cade Stover	Linebacker	Lexington High School	Lexington, Ohio	Ohio State
Daxton Hill	Defensive back	Booker T. Washington High School	Tulsa, Oklahoma	Michigan
Derek Stingley Jr.	Defensive back	The Dunham School	Baton Rouge, Louisiana	LSU
Chris Steele	Defensive back	St. John Bosco High School	Bellflower, California	USC
Eli Ricks^{‡}	Defensive back	Mater Dei High School	Santa Ana, California	LSU
Jay Bramblett	Placekicker	Katy High School	Tuscaloosa, Alabama	Notre Dame

Second Team Offense

Player	Position	School	Hometown	College
Kaiden Bennett	Quarterback	Folsom High School	Folsom, California	Boise State
Grant Gunnell	Quarterback	St. Pius X High School	Houston, Texas	Arizona
John Emery Jr.	Running back	Destrehan High School	Destrehan, Louisiana	LSU
Trey Sanders	Running back	IMG Academy	Bradenton, Florida	Alabama
Charlie Spegal^{‡}	Running back	New Palestine High School	New Palestine, Indiana	Indiana
Julian Fleming^{‡}	Wide receiver	Southern Columbia High School	Catawissa, Pennsylvania	Ohio State
Jadon Haselwood	Wide receiver	Cedar Grove High School	Ellenwood, Georgia	Oklahoma
Theo Wease Jr.	Wide receiver	Allen High School	Allen, Texas	Oklahoma
Jake Smith	Wide receiver	Notre Dame Preparatory High School	Scottsdale, Arizona	Texas
Brayden Liebrock	Tight end	Chandler High School	Chandler, Arizona	Texas
Wanya Morris	Offensive Line	Grayson High School	Loganville, Georgia	Tennessee
Nolan Rumler	Offensive Line	Archbishop Hoban High School	Akron, Ohio	Michigan
Will Reichard	Placekicker	Hoover High School	Birmingham, Alabama	Alabama

Second Team Defense

Player	Position	School	Hometown	College
Antonio Alfano	Defensive line	Colonia High School	Colonia, New Jersey	Alabama
Chris Braswell^{‡}	Defensive line	St. Frances Academy	Baltimore, Maryland	Alabama
McKinnley Jackson^{‡}	Defensive line	George County High School	Lucedale, Mississippi	Texas A&M
Zacch Pickens	Defensive line	T. L. Hanna High School	Anderson, South Carolina	South Carolina
Ty Robinson	Defensive line	Gilbert High School	Gilbert, Arizona	Nebraska
Faatui Tuitele	Defensive line	Saint Louis School	Honolulu, Hawaii	Washington
De'Gabriel Floyd	Linebacker	Westlake High School	Westlake Village, California	Texas
Owen Pappoe	Linebacker	Grayson High School	Loganville, Georgia	Auburn
Shane Lee	Linebacker	St. Frances Academy	Baltimore, Maryland	Alabama
Henry To'oTo'o	Linebacker	De La Salle High School	Concord, California	Tennessee
Akeem Dent	Defensive back	Palm Beach Central High School	Wellington, Florida	Florida State
Kyle Hamilton	Defensive back	Marist School	Atlanta, Georgia	Notre Dame
DeMarcco Hellams	Defensive back	DeMatha Catholic High School	Hyattsville, Maryland	Alabama
Mike Sainristil	Defensive back	Everett High School	Everett, Massachusetts	Michigan
Austin McNamara	Placekicker	Highland High School	Gilbert, Arizona	Texas Tech

=== 2019 team ===
See footnotes

- Coach of the Year: Reginald Samples (Duncanville High School, Duncanville, Texas)

Note: Bold denotes Offensive and Defensive Players of the Year, respectively, and ^{‡} denotes high school juniors

First Team Offense

Player	Position	School	Hometown	College
**Bryce Young**	**Quarterback**	**Mater Dei High School**	Santa Ana, California	Alabama
DJ Uiagalelei	Quarterback	St. John Bosco High School	Bellflower, California	Clemson
Demarkus Bowman	Running back	Lakeland High School	Lakeland, Florida	Clemson
Bijan Robinson	Running back	Salpointe Catholic High School	Tucson, Arizona	Texas
Jalen White	Running back	Daleville High School	Daleville, Alabama	Georgia Southern
Kody Epps	Wide receiver	Mater Dei High School	Santa Ana, California	BYU
Julian Fleming	Wide receiver	Southern Columbia High School	Catawissa, Pennsylvania	Ohio State
Marvin Mims	Wide receiver	Lone Star High School	Frisco, Texas	Oklahoma
Jaxon Smith-Njigba	Wide receiver	Rockwall High School	Rockwall, Texas	Ohio State
Arik Gilbert	Tight end	Marietta High School	Marietta, Georgia	LSU
Savion Byrd^{‡}	Offensive line	Duncanville High School	Dallas, Texas	Oklahoma
Paris Johnson Jr.	Offensive line	Princeton High School	Sharonville, Ohio	Ohio State
Myles Murao	Offensive line	Mater Dei High School	Santa Ana, California	Washington
Andrew Raym	Offensive line	Broken Arrow High School	Broken Arrow, Oklahoma	Oklahoma
Landon Tengwall^{‡}	Offensive line	Our Lady of Good Counsel High School	Olney, Maryland	Penn State
Joshua Karty	Placekicker	Western Alamance High School	Elon, North Carolina	Stanford

First Team Defense

Player	Position	School	Hometown	College
**Justin Flowe**	**Linebacker**	**Upland High School**	Upland, California	Oregon
Noah Sewell	Linebacker	Orem High School	Orem, Utah	Oregon
Cody Simon	Linebacker	St. Peter's Preparatory School	Jersey City, New Jersey	Ohio State
Josh White	Linebacker	Cypress Creek High School	Houston, Texas	LSU
Chris Braswell	Defensive line	St. Frances Academy	Baltimore, Maryland	Alabama
Bryan Bresee	Defensive line	Damascus High School	Damascus, Maryland	Clemson
Jordan Burch	Defensive line	Hammond School	Columbia, South Carolina	South Carolina
Fadil Diggs	Defensive line	Woodrow Wilson High school	Camden, New Jersey	Texas A&M
Donell Harris	Defensive line	Gulliver Preparatory School	Miami, Florida	Texas A&M
JT Tuimoloau^{‡}	Defensive line	Eastside Catholic School	Sammamish, Washington	Ohio State
Emeka Egbuka^{‡}	Defensive back	Steilacoom High School	Steilacoom, Washington	Ohio State
Luke Hill	Defensive back	St. Frances Academy	Baltimore, Maryland	Oregon
Malachi Moore	Defensive back	Hewitt-Trussville High School	Trussville, Alabama	Alabama
Clark Phillips III	Defensive back	La Habra High School	La Habra, California	Utah
Kelee Ringo	Defensive back	Saguaro High School	Scottsdale, Arizona	Georgia
Hunter Renner	Punter	Marian High School	Mishawaka, Indiana	Northwestern

Second Team Offense

Player	Position	School	Hometown	College
Ja'Quinden Jackson	Quarterback	Duncanville High School	Dallas, Texas	Texas
Caleb Williams^{‡}	Quarterback	Gonzaga College High School	Washington, DC	Oklahoma
Blake Corum	Running back	St. Frances Academy	Baltimore, Maryland	Michigan
TreVeyon Henderson^{‡}	Athlete	Hopewell High School	Hopewell, Virginia	Ohio State
Charlie Spegal	Running back	New Palestine High School	New Palestine, Indiana	Indiana
Elijhah Badger	Wide receiver	Folsom High School	Folsom, California	Arizona State
A.J. Henning	Athlete	Lincoln-Way East High School	Frankfort, Illinois	Michigan
John Humphreys	Wide receiver	Corona Del Mar High School	Newport Beach, California	Stanford
Gee Scott Jr.	Wide receiver	Eastside Catholic School	Sammamish, Washington	Ohio State
Michael Mayer	Tight end	Covington Catholic High School	Alexandria, Kentucky	Notre Dame
Marcus Dumervil	Offensive Line	St. Thomas Aquinas High School	Fort Lauderdale, Florida	LSU
Andrew Gentry	Offensive Line	Columbine High School	Columbine, Colorado	Virginia
Nolan Rucci^{‡}	Offensive Line	Warwick High School	Lititz, Pennsylvania	Wisconsin
Myles Hinton	Offensive Line	Greater Atlanta Christian School	Norcross, Georgia	Stanford
Luke Wypler	Offensive Line	Saint Joseph Regional High School	Montvale, New Jersey	Ohio State
Parker Lewis	Placekicker	Saguaro High School	Scottsdale, Arizona	USC

Second Team Defense

Player	Position	School	Hometown	College
Gervon Dexter	Defensive Line	Lake Wales High School	Lake Wales, Florida	Florida
Van Fillinger	Defensive line	Corner Canyon High School	Draper, Utah	Utah
Jason Harris	Defensive line	Higley High School	Gilbert, Arizona	Arizona
Landon Jackson^{‡}	Defensive line	Pleasant Grove High School	Texarkana, Texas	LSU
McKinnley Jackson	Defensive line	George County High School	Lucedale, Mississippi	Texas A&M
Jack Sawyer^{‡}	Defensive line	Pickerington High School North	Pickerington, Ohio	Ohio State
Reid Carrico^{‡}	Linebacker	Ironton High School	Ironton, Ohio	Ohio State
Jalen Garner^{‡}	Linebacker	Norcross High School	Norcross, Georgia	Houston
Derek Wingo	Linebacker	St. Thomas Aquinas High School	Fort Lauderdale, Florida	Florida
Zihenryon Perry	Linebacker	Brandon High School	Brandon, Mississippi	Jones College
O. J. Burroughs^{‡}	Defensive back	IMG Academy	Bradenton, Florida	Kansas
Tony Grimes^{‡}	Defensive back	Princess Anne High School	Virginia Beach, Virginia	North Carolina
Antonio Johnson	Defensive back	East St. Louis High School	East St. Louis, Illinois	Texas A&M
Jaylon Jones	Defensive back	Steele High School	Cibolo, Texas	Texas A&M
Jahari Rogers	Defensive back	Arlington High School	Arlington, Texas	Florida
Mitchell Tomasek^{‡}	Punter	Worthington Kilbourne High School	Columbus, Ohio	Eastern Michigan

=== 2025 team ===
See footnotes

- Coach of the Year: Carson Palmer (Santa Margarita Catholic High School, Rancho Santa Margarita, California)

Note: Bold denotes Offensive and Defensive Players of the Year, respectively, and ^{‡} and ^{‡‡} denotes high school juniors and sophomores, respectively

First Team Offense

Player	Position	School	Hometown	College
**Keisean Henderson**	**Quarterback**	**Legacy the School of Sport Sciences**	Houston, Texas	Houston
Ezavier Crowell	Running back	Jackson High School	Jackson, Alabama	Alabama
David Gabriel-Georges^{‡}	Running back	Baylor School	Quebec, Canada	
Jermaine Bishop Jr.	Wide receiver	Willis High School	Willis, Texas	Texas
Roye Oliver III^{‡‡}	Wide receiver	Hamilton High School	Chandler, Arizona	USC
Ian Premer	Tight end	Great Bend High School	Great Bend, Kansas	Notre Dame
Landen Williams-Callis^{‡}	Flex	Randle High School	Richmond, Texas	
Jackson Cantwell	Offensive line	Nixa Public High School	Columbia, Missouri	Miami (FL)
Lamar Brown	Offensive line	Louisiana State University Laboratory School	Baton Rouge, Louisiana	LSU
Darius Gray	Offensive line	St. Christopher's School	Richmond, Virginia	South Carolina
Keenyi Pepe	Offensive line	IMG Academy	Long Beach, Calififornia	USC
Mikey Barth^{‡}	Placekicker	Basha High School	Elon, North Carolina	Arizona State

First Team Defense

Player	Position	School	Hometown	College
Richard Anderson	Defensive line	Edna Karr High School	Baton Rouge, Louisiana	LSU
Bryce Perry-Wright	Defensive line	Buford High School	Atlanta, Georgia	Texas A&M
Deuce Geralds	Defensive line	Collins Hill High School	Suwanee, Georgia	LSU
Luke Wafle	Defensive line	Hun School of Princeton	Middletown Township, New Jersey	USC
**Cincere Johnson**	**Linebacker**	**Glenville High School**	Cleveland, Ohio	Ohio State
Tyler Atkinson	Linebacker	Grayson High School	Lawrenceville, Georgia	Texas
TJ White	Linebacker	Jackson Academy	Jackson, Mississippi	Tennessee
Quinton Cypher^{‡}	Linebacker	Millbrook High School	Raleigh, North Carolina	Ohio State
Jermaine Bishop Jr.	Cornerback	Willis High School	Willis, Texas	Texas
Jireh Edwards	Safety	St. Frances Academy	Upper Marlboro, Maryland	Alabama
Jaden Walk-Green^{‡}	Flex	Centennial High School	Corona, California	
Jimmy Gregg	Punter	University High School	Morgantown, West Virginia	Syracuse

Second Team Offense

Player	Position	School	Hometown	College
Jett Thomalla	Quarterback	Millard South High School	Lexington, Nebraska	Alabama
Ty Keys^{‡}	Running back	Poplarville High School	Poplarville, Mississippi	Miami
SaRod Baker^{‡}	Running back	DeSoto High School	DeSoto, Texas	Texas Tech
C.J. Sadler	Wide receiver	Cass Technical High School	Detroit, Michigan	North Carolina
Boobie Feaster	Wide receiver	DeSoto High School	Shreveport, Louisiana	USC
Kaiden Prothro	Tight end	Bowdon High School	Bowdon, Georgia	Georgia
Cederian Morgan	Flex	Benjamin Russell High School	Alexander City, Alabama	Alabama
Kaeden Penny^{‡}	Offensive Line	Bixby High School	Bixby, Oklahoma	Oklahoma
Felix Ojo	Offensive Line	Lake Ridge High School	Mansfield, Texas	Texas Tech
Kodi Greene	Offensive Line	Mater Dei High School	Renton, Washington	Washington
Immanuel Iheanacho	Offensive Line	Georgetown Prep	Baltimore, Maryland	Oregon
Harran Zureikat	Placekicker	Fox Chapel Area High School	Pittsburgh, Pennsylvania	Georgia

Second Team Defense

Player	Position	School	Hometown	College
Carter Buck	Defensive Line	Lake Travis High School	Austin, Texas	TCU
Breeze Carter	Defensive line	Douglas County High School	Douglasville, Georgia	Tennessee
Aaden Aytch	Defensive line	Jefferson High School	Lafayette, Indiana	Minnesota
Prince Williams	Defensive line	Bishop Gorman High School	Las Vegas, Nevada	Arizona
Xavier Griffin	Linebacker	Gainesville High School	Cullman, Alabama	Alabama
Anthony Jones Jr.	Linebacker	St. Paul's Episcopal School	Mobile, Alabama	Oregon
Roman Igwebuike^{‡}	Linebacker	Mount Carmel High School	Chicago, Illinois	
Jalaythan Mayfield^{‡}	Linebacker	Lincolnton High School	Lincolnton, North Carolina	
Jorden Edmonds	Cornerback	Sprayberry High School	Marietta, Georgia	Alabama
Jett Washington	Safety	Bishop Gorman High School	Las Vegas, Nevada	Oregon
Ayden Pouncey	Flex	Winter Park High School	Orlando, Florida	Notre Dame
Wade Register	Punter	Trinity Christian School	Dublin, Georgia	Georgia

== Accumulated stats ==
Most selections by school (as of 2017)

Rank	State	Selections
1	De La Salle High School, Concord, California	8.5
2	Cretin-Derham Hall High School, St. Paul, Minnesota	8
3	IMG Academy, Bradenton, Florida	6.5
4	St. Thomas Aquinas High School, Fort Lauderdale, Florida	6
4	Bishop Gorman High School, Las Vegas, Nevada	6
6	Carter High School, Dallas, Texas	5
7	Oaks Christian School, Westlake Village, California	4.5
8	Moeller High School, Cincinnati, Ohio	3.5
8	Northwestern High School, Miami, Florida	3.5
8	American Heritage School, Plantation, Florida	3.5

Most selections by state (as of 2017)

Rank	State	Selections
1	Florida	140
2	California	126
2	Texas	126
4	Georgia	60.5
5	Ohio	46.5
6	Pennsylvania	46
6	Illinois	46
8	Louisiana	42
9	New Jersey	36.5
9	Alabama	36.5

== See also ==
- USA Today All-USA High School Baseball Team
- USA Today All-USA High School Basketball Team
- Gatorade High School Football Player of the Year
- USA Today/National Prep Poll High School Football National Championship
- Big 33 Football Classic
- National High School Hall of Fame
