= Jared Norris =

American football player (born 1993)

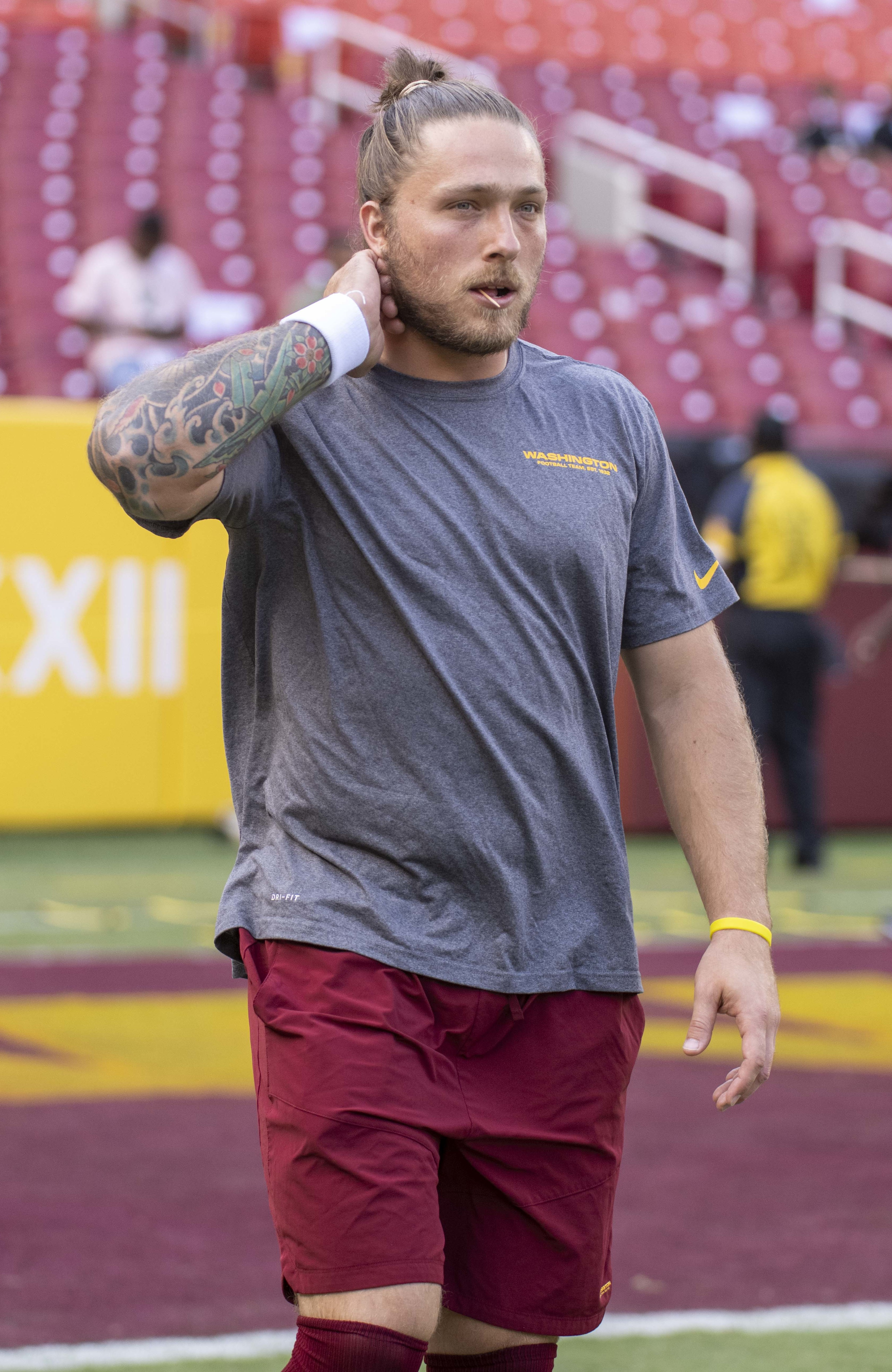
- Norris with the Washington Football Team in 2021

No. 52
- Position: Linebacker

Personal information
- Born: July 19, 1993 (age 33); Bakersfield, California, U.S.
- Listed height: 6 ft 1 in (1.85 m)
- Listed weight: 238 lb (108 kg)

Career information
- High school: Centennial (Bakersfield)
- College: Utah (2011–2015)
- NFL draft: 2016: undrafted

Career history
- Carolina Panthers (2016–2018); Washington Redskins / Football Team (2020–2021)

Awards and highlights
- Second-team All-Pac-12 (2015)

Career NFL statistics
- Total tackles: 17
- Stats at Pro Football Reference

Jared Scott Norris (born July 19, 1993) is an American former professional football player who was a linebacker for the Carolina Panthers and Washington Football Team of the National Football League (NFL). He played high school football at Centennial High School in Bakersfield, California, where he was a three-year starter and three-year letterman. He also earned All-State honors his senior year. Norris played college football for the Utah Utes, where he was a three-year starter and four-year letterman. His senior year in 2015, he was named second-team All-Pac-12 and played in the Senior Bowl. During his college career, Norris played in 42 games and started 32 of them. He recorded 269 total tackles, seven sacks, eight pass breakups, four forced fumbles and two fumble recoveries. After going undrafted in the 2016 NFL draft, Norris signed with the Panthers. He played in 28 games for the Panthers from 2016 to 2018 and made 11 total tackles. He also appeared in 16 contests for the Washington Football Team from 2020 to 2021, recording six total tackles. Norris was primarily a special teams player during his NFL career. Of the 807 career snaps he took part in, 800 were on special teams.

== Early life ==
Norris played linebacker at Centennial High School in Bakersfield, California, where he was a three-year starter and three-year letterman.

In his junior year, he was named second-team All-Area, second-team All-Southwest Yosemite League and Centennial High's co-Defensive Most Valuable Player. He also won the Hometown All-Stars Linebacker Award.

Norris earned second-team MaxPreps Division I All-State accolades as a senior. He was named the All-Area Defensive Player of the Year by The Bakersfield Californian and the Southwest Yosemite League Defensive Player of the Year. He also won the Bakersfield Jockey Club's Outstanding Athlete Award. He won the Hometown All-Stars Linebacker Award for the second consecutive year. Norris missed a few games his senior year due to Valley fever.

He graduated from Centennial High School in 2011. He was teammates with future NFL player Cody Kessler at Centennial High. Norris was a team captain as well. He also earned one letter in baseball.

In the class of 2011, Norris was rated a three-star recruit by Rivals.com, Scout.com, ESPN.com and 247Sports.com. He was also rated the No. 30 inside linebacker in the country by Rivals.com, the No. 29 middle linebacker in the country by Scout.com, the No. 37 inside linebacker in the country by ESPN.com, and the No. 28 inside linebacker in the country by 247Sports.com. He was also rated both a three-star recruit and the No. 28 inside linebacker in the country on 247Sports.com's composite rating, which takes into account the ratings of all the other major recruiting services in the country.

Norris committed to play college football for the Utah Utes in May 2010. He also received offers from California and New Mexico State.

== College career ==
Norris played for the Utah Utes of the University of Utah from 2012 to 2015. He was redshirted in 2011. He was a three-year starter and four-year letterman. Norris played in seven games in 2012, recording two total tackles and a fumble recovery. He played in ten games, and started seven of them, in 2013. Five of his starts were at mac linebacker and two were at rover linebacker. He totaled two sacks, two pass breakups, two forced fumbles and 64 total tackles, 4.5 of which were tackles for loss. Norris missed two games due to injury. He earned Honorable Mention Academic All-Pac-12 honors.

Norris played in 13 games in 2014. All of his starts were at rover linebacker. He recorded 116 total tackles, which was the most on the team and fourth most in the Pac-12. He also averaged 8.9 tackles per game, which was third most in the Pac-12. Norris was named the 2014 Las Vegas Bowl Defensive "Out-Performer" of the game. He also had 13 tackles for loss, four sacks and one pass breakup. He earned Honorable Mention All-Pac-12 and Honorable Mention Academic All-Pac-12 accolades.

Norris appeared in 12 games, all starts, in 2015. All of his starts were at mac linebacker. He accumulated one sack, two forced fumbles, one fumble recovery, five pass breakups and 87 total tackles, 6.5 of which were tackles for loss. He missed one game due to injury. Norris was named second-team All-Pac-12. In April 2015, he was named to the watchlist for the Lott IMPACT Trophy. Three months later, he was named to the watchlists for the Bednarik Award, the Bronko Nagurski Trophy and the Butkus Award. In October 2015, Norris was named a quarter-finalist for the Lott IMPACT Trophy. He was a team captain in 2015 as well. He also played in the 2016 Senior Bowl as part of the North team.

Throughout his college career, Norris played in 42 games and started 32 of them. He recorded seven sacks, eight pass breakups, four forced fumbles, two fumble recoveries, and 269 total tackles, 24 of which were tackles for loss. He had at least 10 tackles in 11 games during his career. Norris graduated from Utah with a bachelor's degree in economics.

== Professional career ==
=== Pre-draft ===
Norris was rated the ninth best inside linebacker in the 2016 NFL draft by NFLDraftScout.com. Lance Zierlein of NFL.com predicted that he would be selected in the sixth or seventh round. Zierlein said that "Norris looks the part of a backup WILL inside linebacker in a 3-4 who has the potential to become an average starter down the road".

Pre-draft measurables
Height	Weight	Arm length	Hand span	40-yard dash	10-yard split	20-yard split	20-yard shuttle	Three-cone drill	Vertical jump	Broad jump	Bench press
6 ft 1 1/4 in (1.86 m)	241 lb (109 kg)	31 1/2 in (0.80 m)	10 1/8 in (0.26 m)	4.80 s	1.64 s	2.78 s	4.52 s	7.07 s	29 1/2 in (0.75 m)	9 ft 6 in (2.90 m)	19 reps
Cone drill from Pro Day, all others from NFL Combine

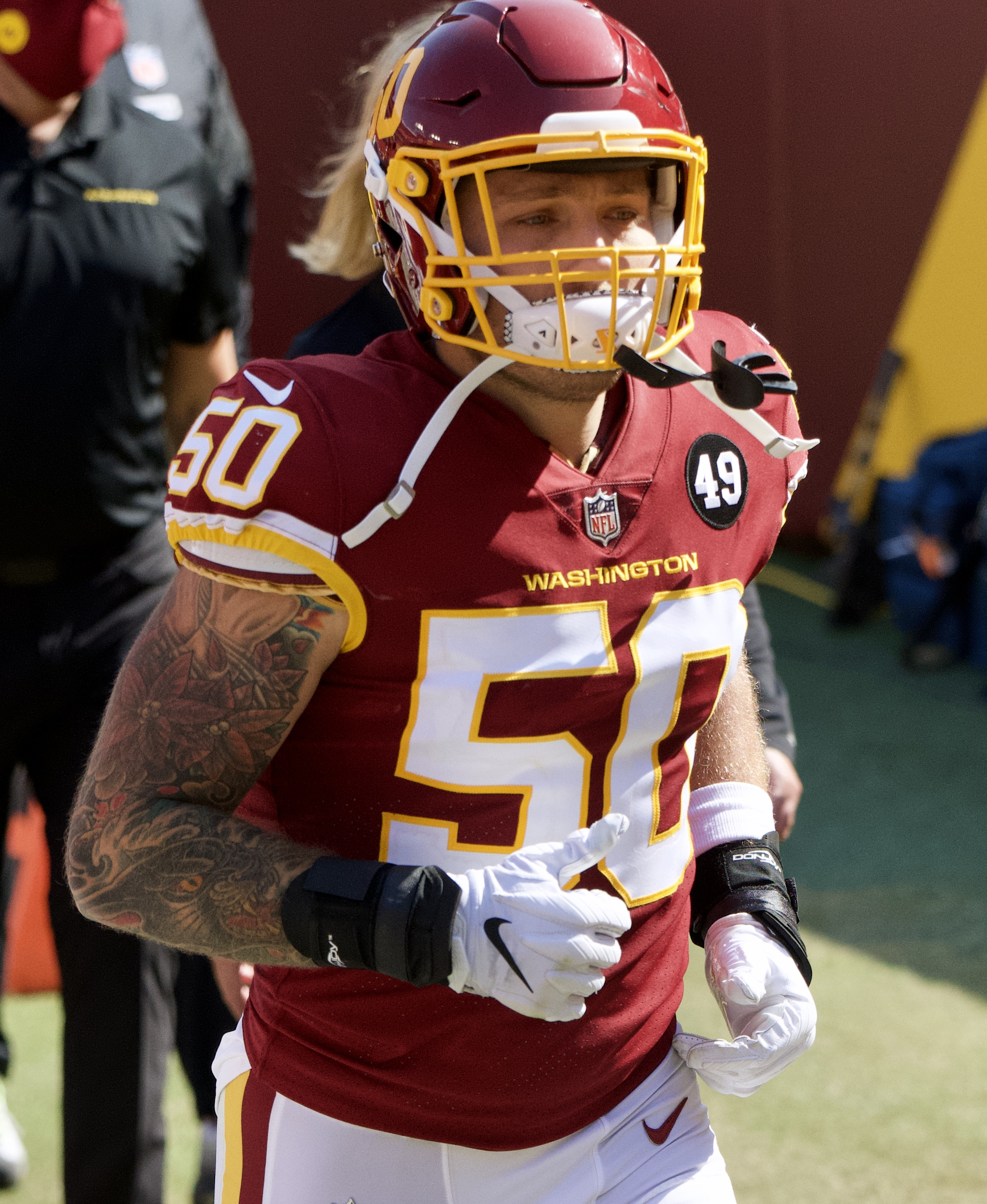
Norris with the Washington Football Team in 2020

=== Carolina Panthers ===
After going undrafted in the 2016 NFL draft, Norris signed with the Carolina Panthers on May 2, 2016. He played in 14 games in 2016, recording three solo tackles and three tackle assists. He appeared in 11 games in 2017 and made four solo tackles. On December 5, 2017, Norris was placed on injured reserve after suffering a calf injury.

He played in three games for the Panthers during the 2018 season and recorded one solo tackle. On October 12, 2018, he was placed on injured reserve after suffering a toe injury in practice. Norris ended up missing the remainder of the season and underwent surgery for the injury. On March 3, 2019, he signed a two-year contract extension, but was waived on August 31, 2019.

Overall, he played in 28 games for the Panthers and made 11 total tackles. All 526 of the snaps that he played in were on special teams.

=== Washington Redskins / Football Team ===
On February 13, 2020, Norris signed with the Washington Redskins. He was waived on September 5 and signed to the practice squad the next day. He was elevated to the active roster on September 19 and September 26 for the team's Weeks 2 and 3 games against the Arizona Cardinals and Cleveland Browns, and reverted to the practice squad after each game. Norris was promoted to the active roster on October 2. Overall, he appeared in 11 regular season games in 2020 and made three solo tackles. He also played in one postseason game.

Norris re-signed with the team on March 23, 2021. He was released on August 31, and re-signed to the practice squad the following day. He was promoted to active roster on September 11, after Curtis Samuel was placed on injured reserve. Norris played in five games in 2021, recording two solo tackles and one assisted tackle. He was placed on injured reserve on October 15 with a shoulder injury, and missed the rest of the season. He became a free agent after the 2021 season.

Overall, Norris played in 16 games for the Washington Football Team and made 6 total tackles while appearing in 274 snaps on specials teams and seven snaps on defense.

== Personal life ==
Norris's father, David, was a swimmer in college. Norris once attended Camp Woodward, a professional skateboarding camp, and was the "biggest skateboarder ever to attend" the camp.
