= Lutui =

Lutui is a surname, and may refer to:

- Aleki Lutui (born 1978), Tongan rugby player
- Hiva Lutui (born 1994), American football player
- Taitusi Lutui (born 1983), Tongan-born former American football player (commonly known as "Deuce" Lutui)
- Soloni Lutui (born 1968), Tongan architect and inventor.
