= Shawn Barber =

Shawn Barber may refer to:

- Shawn Barber (American football) (born 1975), American football linebacker
- Shawn Barber (pole vaulter) (1994–2024), Canadian pole vaulter
