= Michael Paul Williams =

American journalist

Michael Paul Williams (born 1958) is an American journalist and a regular columnist at the Richmond Times-Dispatch. Williams joined the Times-Dispatch in 1982 and became a columnist for the paper in 1992, becoming the first African American to hold this position. In 2021, Williams was awarded the Pulitzer Prize for Commentary for his writing about the protest movements in Richmond in the wake of the murder of George Floyd leading to the removal of many Confederate monuments.

Williams is a graduate of Virginia Union University in Richmond. He earned a graduate degree from the Medill School of Journalism at Northwestern University. While at Northwestern, Williams contemplated a career in sports journalism, but ultimately pursued hard news. He worked for 10 years as a news reporter at the Times-Dispatch but stated in an interview that he "did not really find my true sense of mission until I started writing opinion." From 1999 to 2000, he was Neiman Fellow at Harvard University. He has won several Virginia Press Association awards for his journalism.

Williams spent his early years in the Byrd Park area of Richmond and attended Hermitage High School. He lives in Richmond, Virginia.
