= Southwest Yosemite League =

High school athletic league in California

The Southwest Yosemite League is a high school athletic league that is part of the CIF Central Section. All of the schools are in Bakersfield, California.

The league was reformatted in 2018. Bakersfield High School was opened in 1893, all the other teams in the league have opened since 1992.

There is a seasonal selection of All League players in the scope of sports administered by the league.

== Members ==
- Bakersfield High School
- Garces Memorial High School
- Centennial High School
- Liberty High School
- Frontier High School
- Stockdale High School
