= QB1: Beyond the Lights =

2017 English-language television series

- Genre: Documentary sport
- Directed by: Peter Berg
- Starring: Tate Martell; Jake Fromm; Tayvon Bowers; Justin Fields; Re-al Mitchell; Sam Hartman; Spencer Rattler; Lance LeGendre; Nik Scalzo; Bryce Young; Anthony Richardson; Deuce Hogan
- Music by: Carson Aune
- Country of origin: United States
- Original language: English
- No. of seasons: 4
- No. of episodes: 40

Production
- Running time: 33 min.

Original release
- Network: go90
- Release: February 13, 2017 – April 19, 2018
- Network: Netflix
- Release: August 16, 2019
- Network: Tubi
- Release: August 10, 2023

QB1: Beyond the Lights is an American documentary television series directed by Peter Berg. Each season focuses on three high school senior quarterbacks from different backgrounds as they play their final season before moving on to NCAA Division I college football. It started out as a go90 series then was moved to Netflix but has subsequently been removed.

The first season was released on February 13, 2017 on Netflix. Season 2 premiered on February 28, 2018, whilst Season 3 was released on August 16, 2019 most likely due to Spencer Rattler's suspension from his football team. On August 10, 2023, it was announced that Season 4, which featured Bryce Young, Anthony Richardson, and Deuce Hogan, would be streaming on Tubi TV.

== Cast ==
=== Season 1 ===
- Tayvon Bowers – Committed to the Wake Forest Demon Deacons, subsequently transferred to the Gardner–Webb Runnin' Bulldogs.
- Jake Fromm – Committed to the Georgia Bulldogs. Fromm was subsequently drafted by the Buffalo Bills in the fifth round of the 2020 NFL draft.
- Tate Martell – Committed to the Ohio State Buckeyes, subsequently transferred to the Miami Hurricanes and later to UNLV.

=== Season 2 ===
- Justin Fields – Committed to the Georgia Bulldogs, subsequently transferred to the Ohio State Buckeyes. Fields was drafted by the Chicago Bears in the first round of the 2021 NFL draft. He currently plays for the Kansas City Chiefs.
- Sam Hartman – Committed to the Wake Forest Demon Deacons. He transferred to play for the Notre Dame Fighting Irish. He has since signed with the Commanders in 2024 as an undrafted free agent.
- Re-al Mitchell– Committed to the Iowa State Cyclones, subsequently transferred to the Temple Owls and later to San Diego.

=== Season 3 ===
- Lance Legendre – Committed to the Maryland Terrapins, subsequently transferred to the Louisiana Ragin' Cajuns.
- Spencer Rattler – Committed to the Oklahoma Sooners, subsequently transferred to the South Carolina Gamecocks. Rattler was selected by the New Orleans Saints in the fifth round of the 2024 NFL draft.
- Nik Scalzo – Committed to the Kentucky Wildcats, subsequently transferred to the Samford Bulldogs.

=== Season 4 ===
- Bryce Young - Committed to the Alabama Crimson Tide. Won the Heisman Trophy in 2021. Drafted by the Carolina Panthers first overall in the 2023 NFL draft.
- Anthony Richardson - Committed to the Florida Gators. Subsequently drafted by the Indianapolis Colts fourth overall in the 2023 NFL draft.
- Deuce Hogan - Committed to the Iowa Hawkeyes, subsequently transferred to the Kentucky Wildcats, later transferred to New Mexico State Aggies and Nicholls Colonels.

=== Connections ===
In January, 2019, season 2 subject Justin Fields announced his intention to transfer from Georgia to Ohio State. Season 1 subject Tate Martell – then at Ohio State – tweeted, "Word of advice: don't swing and miss...especially not your second time." Even prior to this, on December 30, 2018, upon word that Fields was giving thought to transferring to Georgia Tech, Martell made it clear that he had no plans to depart, stating, "Why would I leave for someone who hasn’t put in a single second into this program? To just run away from somebody who hasn’t put a single second into workouts anything like that and doesn’t know what the program is all about, there’s not a chance. I will [be the starting quarterback]. I am 100 percent sure on that. I am not just going to walk away from something that I have put so much time into and there is not a chance that I won’t go out there and compete for that." Less than two weeks later, on January 10, Martell chose to enter the NCAA transfer portal, eventually moving to Miami (FL).

Martell and Fields aren't the only subjects to play at the same school. In fact, three colleges have had multiple players from QB1:

- Georgia: Jake Fromm (2017–19), Justin Fields (2018)
- Ohio State: Tate Martell (2017–18), Justin Fields (2019–2020)
- Wake Forest: Tayvon Bowers (2017–18), Sam Hartman (2018–2022)

=== Future success ===
Appearing in Season 1, Fromm has seen significant college football success. Fromm was the first to make a College Football Playoff game with Martell's Buckeyes also making a New Year’s Six game that season, the Cotton Bowl in December 2017 (but Martell not appearing) and Fromm starting at QB for Georgia in the 2018 Rose Bowl three days later. Fromm also started the CFP National Championship Game. He was taken with the 167th pick in the fifth round of the 2020 NFL draft by the Buffalo Bills.

Justin Fields is the first to merit Heisman Trophy consideration, finishing third in 2019. He was drafted 11th overall by the Chicago Bears in the 2021 NFL draft. Bryce Young was a part of the 2020 Alabama Crimson Tide football team that won a National Championship and he won the Heisman Trophy in 2021. Along with Anthony Richardson (American football), Young was drafted in the 2023 NFL draft both in the top five with Young going number one overall to the Carolina Panthers while Richardson went fourth overall to the Indianapolis Colts.

Spencer Rattler was drafted in the 5th Round by the New Orleans Saints in the 2024 NFL draft. Ian Rapoport of NFL Network said he was told by several team executives that Rattler's appearance on the show was a major turnoff, reducing his previously high draft stock.

== Episodes ==
Season	Episodes	Originally released		
Season	Episodes	First released	Last released	Network
1	10	February 13, 2017	April 17, 2017	go90
2	10	February 28, 2018	April 19, 2018	go90
3	10	August 16, 2019		Netflix
4	10	August 10, 2023		Tubi

=== Season 1 (2017) ===
No. overall	No. in season	Title	Original release date
1	1	"The Journey Begins"	February 13, 2017
2	2	"Kick Off"	February 20, 2017
3	3	"Don't Mess with Texas"	February 27, 2017
4	4	"Being King"	March 6, 2017
5	5	"Sibling Rivalry"	March 13, 2017
6	6	"A Storm Is Brewing"	March 20, 2017
7	7	"Significant Others"	March 27, 2017
8	8	"Make or Break"	April 3, 2017
9	9	"Sacrifice"	April 10, 2017
10	10	"On to the Next"	April 17, 2017

=== Season 2 (2018) ===
No. overall	No. in season	Title	Original release date
11	1	"A Game About Life"	February 28, 2018
12	2	"Paying the Price"	February 28, 2018
13	3	"Battle Ready"	February 28, 2018
14	4	"Perception is Reality"	March 6, 2018
15	5	"Something to Prove"	March 13, 2018
16	6	"Grace & Redemption"	March 20, 2018
17	7	"Reality Check"	March 27, 2018
18	8	"Fully Committed"	April 3, 2018
19	9	"Sidelined"	April 11, 2018
20	10	"Moving the Chains"	April 19, 2018

=== Season 3 (2019) ===
No. overall	No. in season	Title	Original release date
21	1	"What's Your Why"	August 16, 2019
22	2	"Setting the Tone"	August 16, 2019
23	3	"Close Call"	August 16, 2019
24	4	"Got your Back"	August 16, 2019
25	5	"Living the Game"	August 16, 2019
26	6	"Comeback"	August 16, 2019
27	7	"Last Dance"	August 16, 2019
28	8	"Game of Inches"	August 16, 2019
29	9	"Next Man Up"	August 16, 2019
30	10	"Never Settle"	August 16, 2019

=== Season 4 (2023) ===
No. overall	No. in season	Title	Original release date
31	1	"A Game for the Few"	August 10, 2023
32	2	"Don’t Flinch"	August 10, 2023
33	3	"Driven"	August 10, 2023
34	4	"S.O.U.L."	August 10, 2023
35	5	"48 Minutes of Hell"	August 10, 2023
36	6	"Overrated"	August 10, 2023
37	7	"Guard the Momentum"	August 10, 2023
38	8	"The Rivalry"	August 10, 2023
39	9	"Honor the Game"	August 10, 2023
40	10	"No Second Chances"	August 10, 2023
