= Justin Flowe =

American football player (born 2001)

No. 20 – UNLV Rebels
- Position: Inside linebacker
- Class: Redshirt Junior

Personal information
- Born: October 23, 2001 (age 25)
- Listed height: 6 ft 2 in (1.88 m)
- Listed weight: 220 lb (100 kg)

Career information
- High school: Upland (CA)
- College: Oregon (2020–2022); Arizona (2023–2024); UNLV (2025–present

Awards and highlights
- High school Butkus Award (2019); USA Today Defensive Player of the Year (2019); 2× USA Today High School All-American (2018, 2019)
- Stats at ESPN

Justin Flowe (born October 23, 2001) is an American college football inside linebacker. He played college football for the University of Oregon from 2020 to 2022 and the University of Arizona from 2023 to 2024. In 2025, he entered the NCAA transfer portal for the second time and signed with the University of Nevada Las Vegas.

== Early life ==
Flowe attended Upland High School in Upland, California. As a senior, he was the USA Today High School Defensive Player of the Year and won the Dick Butkus Award.

A five star recruit, he committed to University of Oregon to play college football. Justin played with his brother Jonathan, a fellow linebacker, at Upland High School and four star recruit in the 2021 class.
