= Tate Martell =

American football player (born 1998)

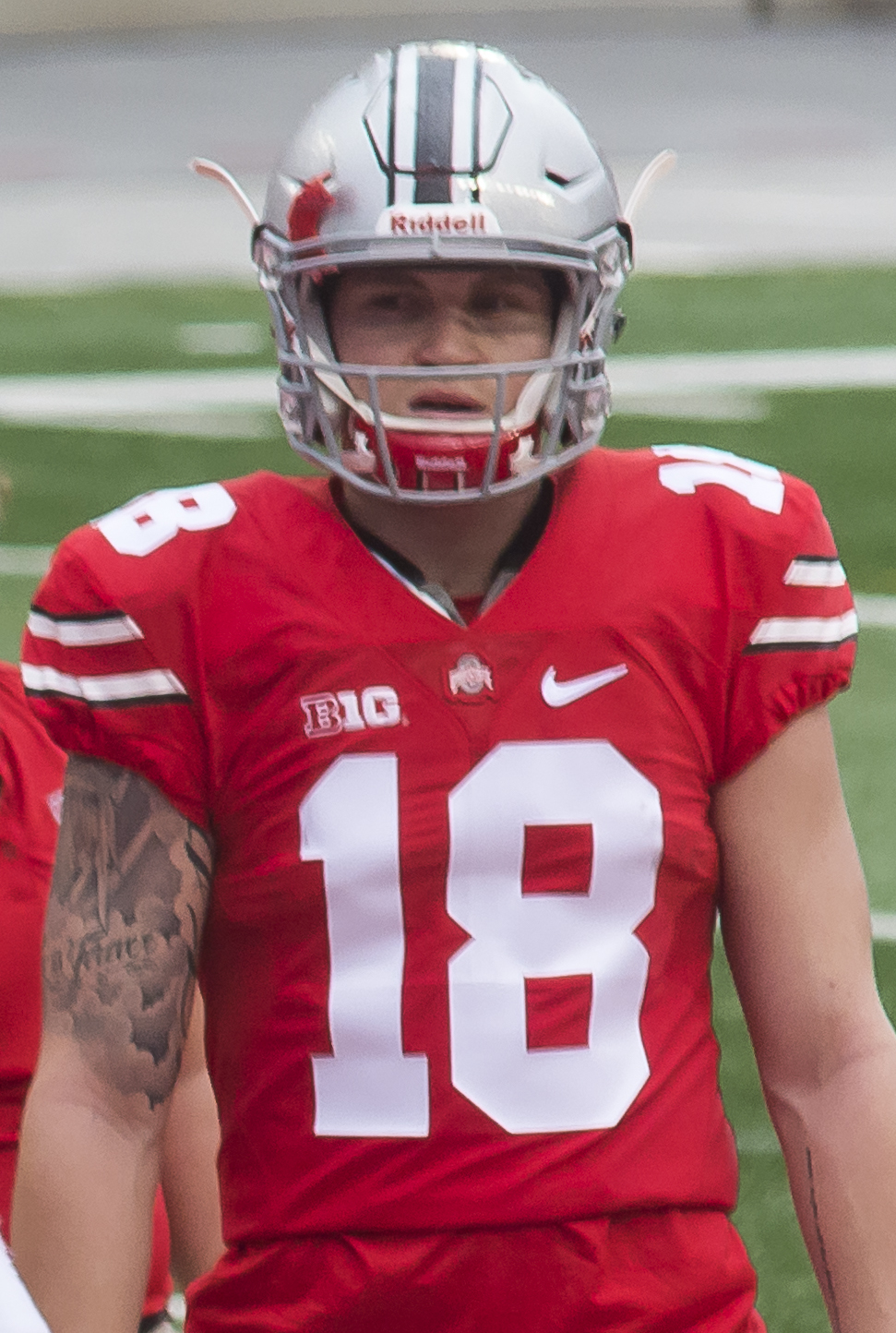
- Martell with the Ohio State Buckeyes in 2017

No. 18, 16
- Position: Quarterback

Personal information
- Born: January 26, 1998 (age 28); Poway, California, U.S.
- Listed height: 5 ft 11 in (1.80 m)
- Listed weight: 210 lb (95 kg)

Career information
- High school: Bishop Gorman (Las Vegas, Nevada)
- College: Ohio State (2017–2018); Miami (FL) (2019–2020); UNLV (2021)

Awards and highlights
- Rose Bowl champion (2019); Cotton Bowl Classic champion (2017); 2× Big Ten champion (2017, 2018); Gatorade Football Player of the Year (2016); USA Today Offensive Player of the Year (2016); 2× USA Today All-American (2014, 2016)
- Stats at ESPN

Tathan "Tate" Martell (born January 26, 1998) is an American former college football quarterback and wide receiver. He played college football for the Ohio State Buckeyes, Miami Hurricanes and UNLV Rebels.

== Early life ==
Tathan Martell grew up in the San Diego area, where he began playing Pop Warner football at the age of 7. He drew attention due to the fact that he was a throwing quarterback, when most kids at that age were running quarterbacks. He even drew attention of the coach of the Washington Huskies at the time, Steve Sarkisian, whom Martell originally committed to play college football for.

Martell first attended Poway High School, his hometown high school, but was only able to lead them to a 4–7 season. He then transferred to Bishop Gorman High School in Las Vegas, Nevada. He attended Bishop Gorman to succeed the quarterback play of Randall Cunningham II for his sophomore, junior and senior seasons, but graduated from Desert Pines High School in Las Vegas because Bishop Gorman would not allow Martell to graduate early in order to start the spring semester at Ohio State University. As a senior, he was the Gatorade Football Player of the Year after leading the team to a 15–0 record, while passing for 2,362 yards and 41 touchdowns, and rushing for 1,253 yards and 21 touchdowns. For his career, after transferring to Bishop Gorman, Martell went 45–0 as a starter and finished second in Nevada history with 7,510 passing yards and 113 touchdowns. Martell and quarterbacks Jake Fromm and Tayvon Bowers were documented in the Netflix series QB1: Beyond the Lights.

Martell was rated by Scout.com as a five-star recruit and was ranked as the second best dual-threat quarterback, fifth best quarterback of any type, and 56th best player overall in his class. He originally committed to the University of Washington when he was 14. In 2015, he changed his commitment to Texas A&M University. In May 2016 he decommitted from A&M and a month later committed to Ohio State University.

=== High school statistics ===
Season	Team	Games		Passing							Rushing			
Season	Team	GP	Record	Cmp	Att	Pct	Yds	TD	Int	Rtg	Att	Yds	Avg	TD
2014	Bishop Gorman	15	15–0	124	200	62.0	2,537	40	2	141.3	73	433	5.9	5
2015	Bishop Gorman	15	15–0	133	237	56.1	2,608	32	6	123.7	98	604	6.2	9
2016	Bishop Gorman	15	15–0	136	215	63.3	2,362	41	1	138.2	146	1,257	8.6	21
Career		45	45–0	393	652	60.3	7,507	113	9	134.1	317	2,294	7.2	35

== College career ==
=== Ohio State ===
Martell redshirted his true freshman season at Ohio State in 2017. As a redshirt freshman in 2018, Martell battled for the starting role in spring camp but ultimately served as the backup to Dwayne Haskins. In Ohio State's opener against the Oregon State Beavers, Martell completed three passes for 33 yards on four attempts. The next week against the Rutgers Scarlet Knights, Martell secured his first career touchdown via a 51-yard pass to Terry McLaurin, his first-and-only touchdown pass as a college quarterback; as well as a 47-yard touchdown run. Martell appeared in six games for the Buckeyes in 2018, finishing with 269 passing yards, one passing touchdown, 128 rushing yards, and two rushing touchdowns.

In January 2019, Georgia quarterback Justin Fields announced his intention to transfer to Ohio State, prompting Martell to tweet, "Word of advice: don't swing and miss...especially not your second time." Prior to this, on December 30, 2018—upon word that Fields was giving thought to transferring to Ohio State—Martell stated, "Why would I leave for someone who hasn't put in a single second into this program? To just run away from somebody who hasn't put a single second into workouts anything like that and doesn't know what the program is all about, there's not a chance. I will [be the starting quarterback]. I am 100 percent sure on that. I am not just going to walk away from something that I have put so much time into and there is not a chance that I won't go out there and compete for that." Less than two weeks later, on January 10, Martell chose to enter the NCAA transfer portal.

=== Miami ===
On January 15, 2019, Martell announced on social media that he would be transferring to the University of Miami. Martell, who would normally have to sit out one year due to NCAA transfer rules, sought a hardship waiver in order to be immediately eligible, citing Ohio State's coaching change from Urban Meyer to Ryan Day. On March 19, Martell was granted a waiver by the NCAA and was eligible to play for the Miami Hurricanes in 2019. On August 12, it was announced that redshirt freshman Jarren Williams had beaten out Martell for the starting quarterback job. He then switched to wide receiver, then switched back to quarterback. In September 2020, Martell opted out of the 2020 season after having been suspended to start the year.

=== UNLV ===
On July 26, 2021, it was announced that Martell would be transferring to the University of Nevada, Las Vegas, to play for the UNLV Rebels. He appeared in only two games with one pass attempt during the 2021 season due to injury.

On January 18, 2022, Martell announced he was retiring from football.

=== College statistics ===
Year	Team	Passing							Rushing			
Year	Team	Cmp	Att	Pct	Yds	TD	Int	Rate	Att	Yds	Avg	TD
2017	Ohio State	Redshirt										
2018	Ohio State	23	28	82.1	269	1	0	174.6	22	128	5.8	2
2019	Miami	1	1	100.0	7	0	0	158.8	7	7	1.0	0
2020	Miami	Opted out due to COVID-19 pandemic										
2021	UNLV	2	6	33.3	27	0	0	71.1	4	2	0.5	0
Total		26	35	74.3	303	1	0	156.4	33	137	4.2	2
