= J. J. Denman =

American football player

No. 77
- Position: Offensive tackle

Personal information
- Born: c. 1994 (age 31–32); Yardley, Pennsylvania, U.S.
- Listed height: 6 ft 6 in (1.98 m)
- Listed weight: 305 lb (138 kg)

Career information
- High school: Fairless Hills (PA) Pennsbury
- College: Rutgers University (2012–present)

Awards and highlights
- USA Today High School All-American (2011)
- Stats at ESPN

J. J. Denman (born c. 1994) is an American college football offensive tackle. He currently attends Rutgers University. Denman is regarded as one of the best offensive tackles of his class.

A native of Yardley, Pennsylvania, Denman attended Pennsbury High School where he was an All-American offensive lineman. Regarded as a four-star recruit by Rivals.com, Denman was listed as the No. 27 offensive tackle prospect of his class. He committed to Rutgers after switching from Penn State to Wisconsin, following Joe Paterno's leave.

In 2017, the Buffalo Bills invited him to have a rookie tryout.
