= Shawn Barber (American football) =

American football player and coach (born 1975)

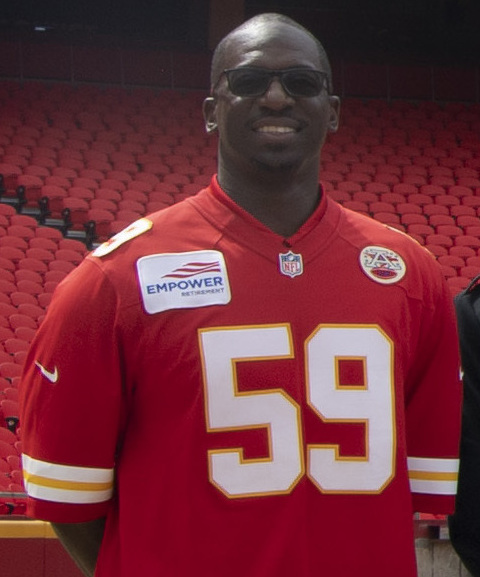
- Barber at Arrowhead Stadium in 2021

No. 59, 56, 51
- Position: Linebacker

Personal information
- Born: January 14, 1975 (age 51); Richmond, Virginia, U.S.
- Listed height: 6 ft 2 in (1.88 m)
- Listed weight: 240 lb (109 kg)

Career information
- High school: Hermitage (Henrico, Virginia)
- College: Richmond
- NFL draft: 1998: 3rd round, 113th overall pick

Career history
- Washington Redskins (1998–2001); Philadelphia Eagles (2002); Kansas City Chiefs (2003–2005); Philadelphia Eagles (2006); Houston Texans (2007)

Career NFL statistics
- Total tackles: 563
- Sacks: 10
- Forced fumbles: 7
- Fumble recoveries: 7
- Interceptions: 7
- Defensive touchdowns: 2
- Stats at Pro Football Reference

Shawn William Barber (born January 14, 1975) is an American former professional football player who was a linebacker in the National Football League (NFL). He played college football for the Richmond Spiders and was selected by the Washington Redskins in the fourth round of the 1998 NFL draft. He also played for the Philadelphia Eagles, Kansas City Chiefs and Houston Texans.

== Early life ==
Barber was an all-district and all-region player as a safety at Hermitage High School in Richmond. Despite not playing football until he was a junior, he returned three interceptions for touchdowns and averaged over 20.0 yards per catch as a senior. He also earned all-district honors in basketball and lettered once in track. In addition, he also letter in baseball his senior year. He even dabbled in gymnastics in middle school.

== College career ==
Barber began his collegiate career at the University of Richmond as a safety but was moved to linebacker in his sophomore year. As a junior, Barber was an All-American honorable mention by the Associated Press and an all-Yankee Conference first-team selection. He recorded 94 total tackles (56 solo), six sacks, 13 tackles for a loss, and a forced fumble en route to becoming the Atlantic 10 Conference Defensive Player of the Year in 1997 as a senior. He also added three interceptions and on special teams he blocked two kicks. In his four seasons at Richmond, Barber played in a total of 44 games with 33 starts and totaled 305 tackles, 20 sacks, 30 tackles for a loss, and five interceptions.

== Professional career ==
=== Washington Redskins ===
Barber was drafted in the 1998 NFL draft by the Washington Redskins. In 1998, Barber saw duty in 16 games (one start) for the Redskins, amassing 34 tackles (28 solo), one interception, two passes defensed and a forced fumble. Also added a team-high 15 special teams tackles. During the 1999 season, he opened all 16 Redskins games for the first time in his career and totaled a career-high 148 tackles, 1 sack, five passes defensed, three forced fumbles and eight special teams tackles. He also added two interceptions for 70 yards with a touchdown. In 2000, Barber started 14 games for Redskins and was inactive for two games. That season, he registered 82 tackles, 2.0 sacks, two fumble recoveries and two special teams tackles. His last year as a Redskin was 2001. While he was a Redskin he appeared in 49 games (34 starts), amassing 281 tackles, 3 sacks, three interceptions with one touchdown, two fumble recoveries, four forced fumbles and added 25 special teams tackles. While he was there, he started two playoff games in 1999, amassing 16 tackles, a sack and a forced fumble.

=== Philadelphia Eagles (first stint) ===
Barber's first season with the Philadelphia Eagles was in 2002. He started all 16 games as a linebacker and produced 119 tackles, one sack, two interceptions, including a career-long 80-yard touchdown, a career-high three fumble recoveries, one forced fumble, and seven passes defensed.

=== Kansas City Chiefs ===
In 2003, Barber was then signed by the Kansas City Chiefs, as an unrestricted free agent where he started 16 games. He ranked second on the team with 112 tackles, was tied for second on the team with a career-high five sacks and had two forced fumbles, one interception, and five passes deflected. He started his first game in a Chiefs uniform against the San Diego Chargers on September 7, recording seven tackles and a team-high two passes deflected. During the 2004 season, he started the season's first eight games at linebacker and finished with 42 tackles and a sack, as well as five passes deflected, a forced fumble, two quarterback pressures and an interception. In 2005, he only played three games for the Chiefs. Due to salary cap issues, the Chiefs released him on March 2, 2006.

=== Philadelphia Eagles (second stint) ===
Barber was signed by the Eagles to a one-year deal on March 8, 2006.

=== Houston Texans ===
On March 19, 2007, Barber signed a three-year contract with the Houston Texans. He was released on February 20, 2008.

== Coaching career ==
Barber became a coaching intern for the Philadelphia Eagles during the 2010 offseason.
