= Hermitage High School (Virginia) =

Public high school in Virginia, US

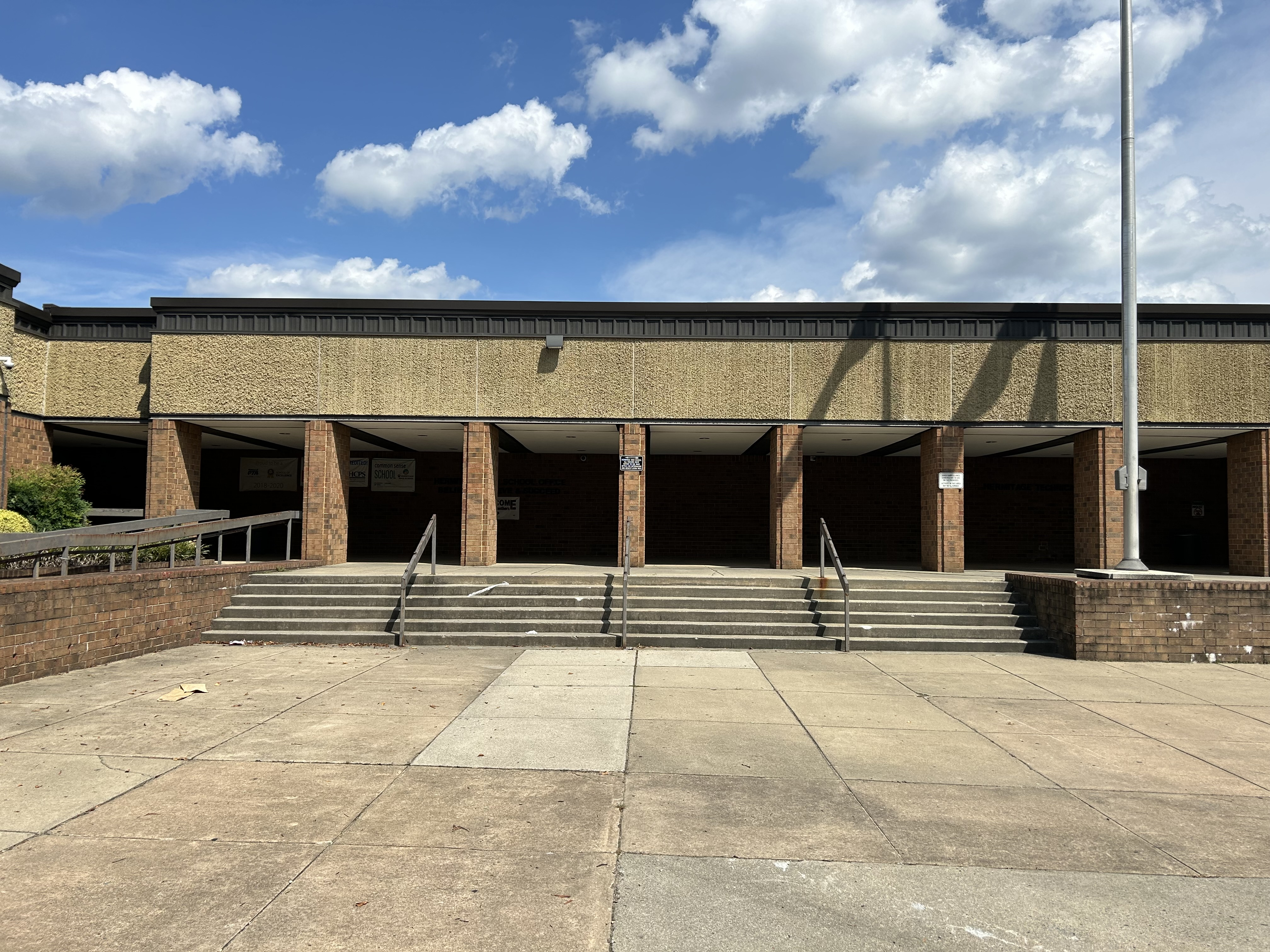

Location
- 8301 Hungary Spring Road; Henrico, Virginia 23228; United States; 37°38′1″N 77°30′57″W

Information
- School type: Public High School
- Motto: "Roll Pride"
- Founded: 1952
- School district: Henrico County Public Schools
- Superintendent: Amy E. Cashwell
- Principal: Michael A. Jackson
- Teaching staff: 103.98 (FTE)
- Grades: 9-12
- Enrollment: 1,672 (2020-21)
- Student to teacher ratio: 16.08
- Campus: Suburban
- Colors: Red and Blue
- Athletics conference: Virginia High School League; AAA Central Region; AAA Colonial District
- Mascot: Panther
- Nickname: Herm, HHS
- Newspaper: The Panther Post
- Yearbook: Panthian
- Tech Center Principal: Terrie Allsbrooks
- Website: hermitage.henricoschools.us

Hermitage High School is a public school located in the West End of unincorporated Henrico County, Virginia. The mascot of Hermitage High School is the panther. Hermitage High School has athletic facilities with a concrete football stadium and a rubber-turf track. The Hermitage Advanced Career Education Center, an 85,000-square-foot building for the county's workforce development program, opened in January 2024.

== History ==
Initially, Hermitage High School began in 1936 as the Glen Allen High School, which was located at the present-day site of the Glen Allen Cultural Arts Center off Mountain Road. The building that is now George H. Moody Middle School was opened in 1951 as Hermitage High School. The current Hermitage High School was opened in 1972 and is located in the Brookland District.

== Demographics ==
Out of 1,717 students enrolled in fall of 2022, 40.8% were Black, 25.1% White, 22.2% Hispanic, 5.6% Asian, 5.6% Multiple Races, 0.4% American Indian, and 0.1% Native Hawaiian.

Virginia Department of Education (School Quality Profiles)
	2020-21	2021-22	2022-23
Grade 9	495	454	498
Grade 10	409	447	430
Grade 11	454	381	417
Grade 12	414	340	372
Total Students	1,672	1,622	1,717
Economically Disadvantaged	1053	1085	873
Male	877	868	902
Female	795	754	815
Black	722	673	701
White	479	446	431
Hispanic	283	316	382
Asian	82	88	97
Multiple Races	102	92	97
American Indian	3	6	7
Native Hawaiian	1	1	2

== Specialty Centers ==
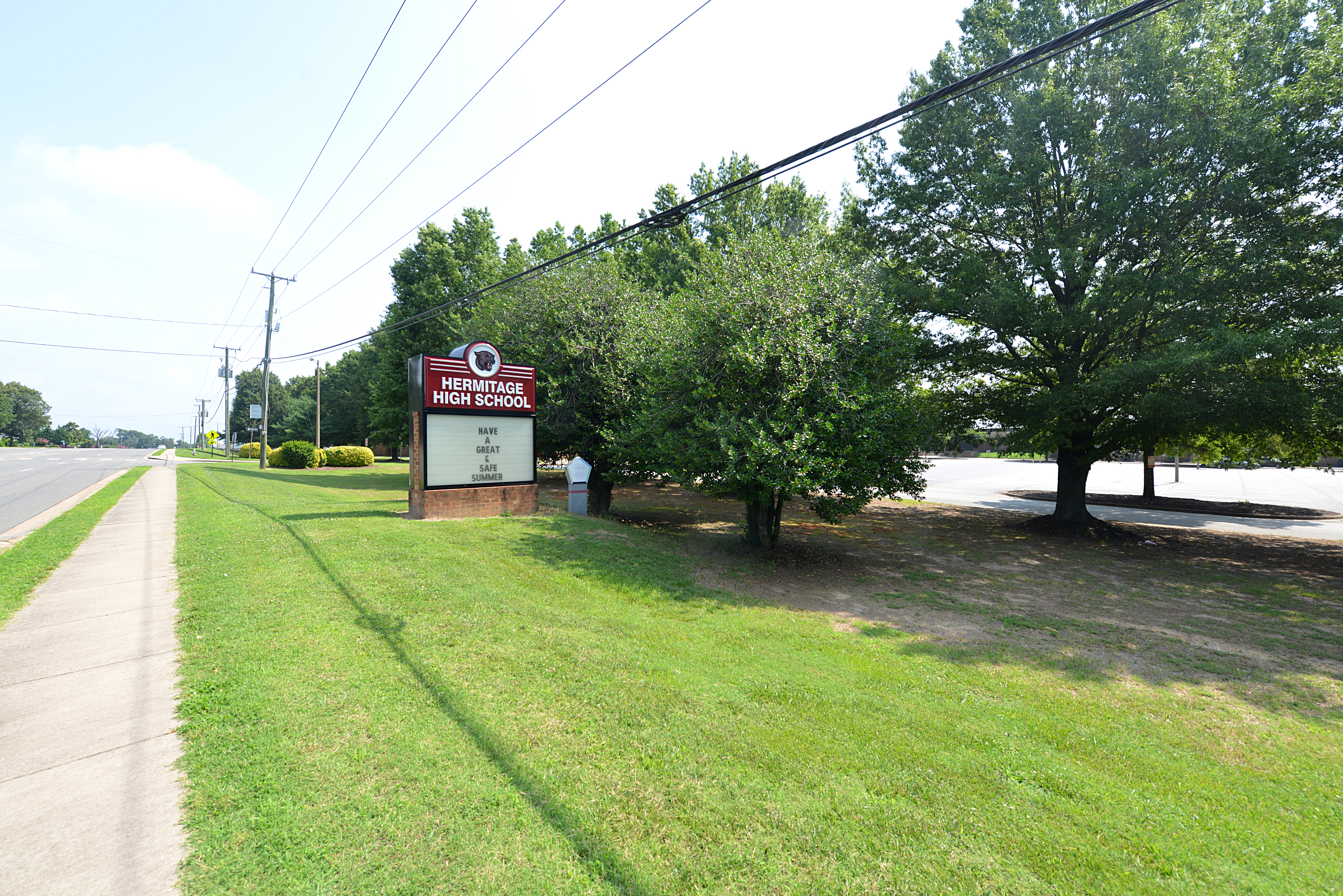
Hermitage High School Street Sign

Hermitage is home to three specialty centers: the Center for the Humanities, Center for Allied Health Sciences, and the Advanced Career Education (ACE) Center. The Humanities Center, founded in 1995, is an interdisciplinary program focusing on english, history, the arts, and philosophy. The program is based in writing and discussion and is modeled after the Great Books program at St. John's College . The Advanced Career Education Center, formerly known as the Hermitage Technical Center, allows students to earn certifications in career and technical education, and includes programs in Cosmetology, Barbering, Landscaping, and Automotive Technology. The Center for Allied Health Sciences is the newest center at Hermitage and focuses on health science education. Through the Center, students can receive certification in Nursing, Vet Science, Sports Medicine, Pharmacy, and EMT.

== Extracurricular Activities ==
Hermitage is home to many athletic teams/sports including football, baseball, basketball, wrestling, cross country, indoor and outdoor Track, soccer, field hockey, volleyball, golf, tennis and softball, along with cheerleading. It also has a thriving arts program, including Visual Arts, Chorus, Drama, and Creative Writing. However, the band program is best known, being a 30 time Virginia honor band and honor band hall of fame member. In addition to arts and athletics, the school also has multiple clubs for students to join, including National Honors Society, student publications, news channel Herm TV, and more.

== Notable alumni ==
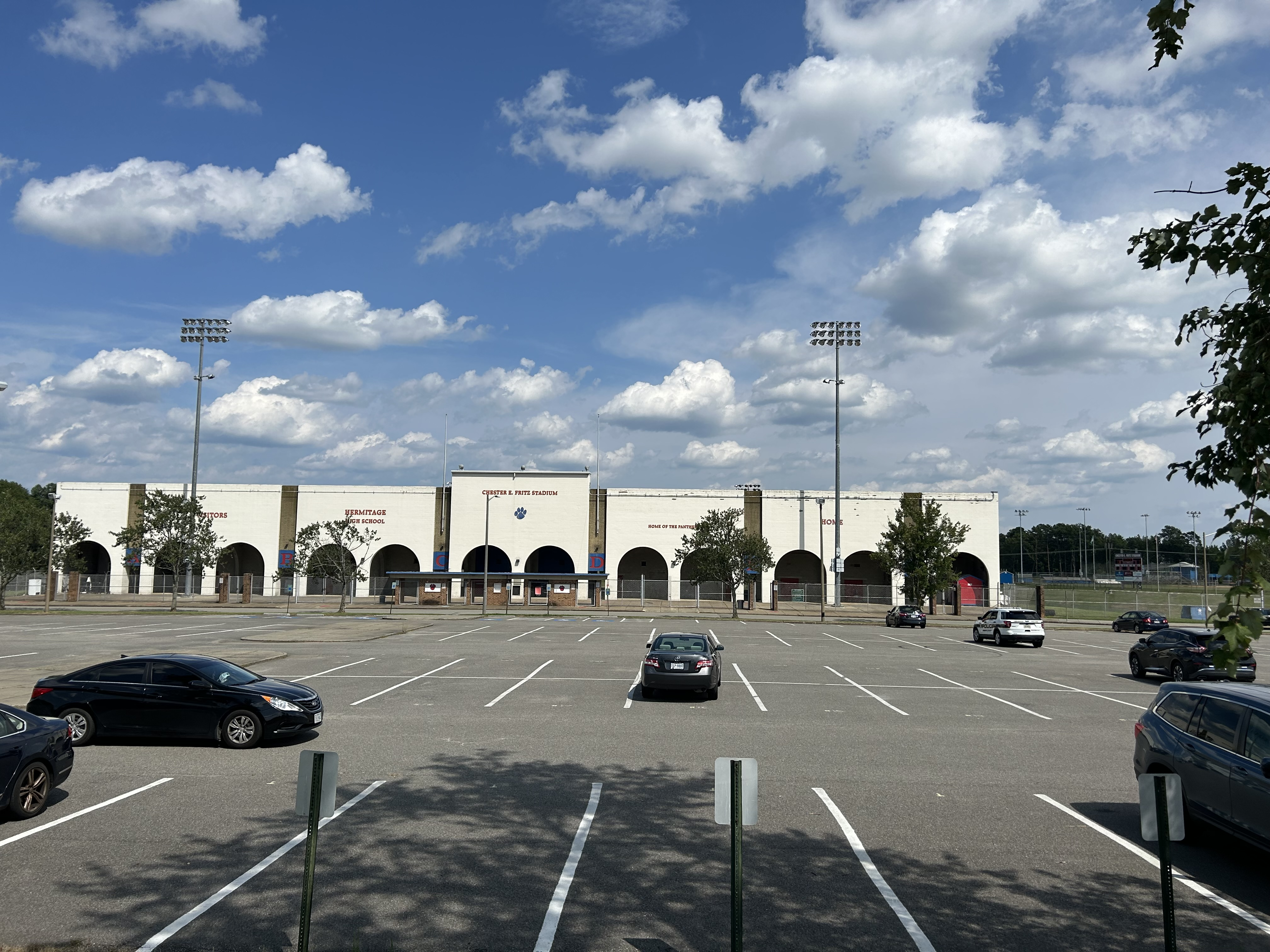
Chester E. Fritz Stadium is the largest high school football stadium in the county, and the only to have concrete seating.

- Jim Jinkins, animator and cartoonist responsible for tv show, Doug, which was inspired in part by his time at Hermitage
- Nettspend, real name Gunner Shepardson attended the school up until ninth grade. He dropped out citing the impact of COVID-19.
- Shawn Barber, former NFL player for the Washington Redskins and later a coaching intern for the Philadelphia Eagles, a team he had two separate stints playing for.
- Duane Brown, NFL Player and first round pick for the Houston Texans.
- Curtis Grant, top recruit in the Class of 2011, formerly played for the San Diego Chargers
- Chris Copeland, NBA player.
- Derrick Green, rated by Rivals.com and Scout.com as the No. 1 running back in the country in the Class of 2013, played for the Michigan Wolverines football team
- Queen Harrison, U.S. Olympic Team 2008 Track and field.
- Orlando Jordan, former professional wrestler for the WWE and TNA Wrestling
- Fontel Mines, former NFL player for the Chicago Bears.
- Darren Sharper, former NFL player for the Green Bay Packers, Minnesota Vikings and lastly the New Orleans Saints, the team that won Super Bowl XLIV.
- Jamie Sharper, former NFL player for the Baltimore Ravens, when they won Super Bowl XXXV. He later played for the Houston Texans and Seattle Seahawks
- Josh Vaughan, NFL player, formerly of the Atlanta Falcons and Carolina Panthers
- Shanon Slack, Professional MMA fighter for Bellator Fighting Championship, 2008 U.S. Olympic Alternate Wrestler, Wrestling coach for Team Cruz on the Ultimate Fighter Season 15 on FOX
- Michael Paul Williams, columnist at the Richmond Times-Dispatch, winner of the 2021 Pulitzer Prize for Commentary
