= Cody Kessler =

American football player (born 1993)

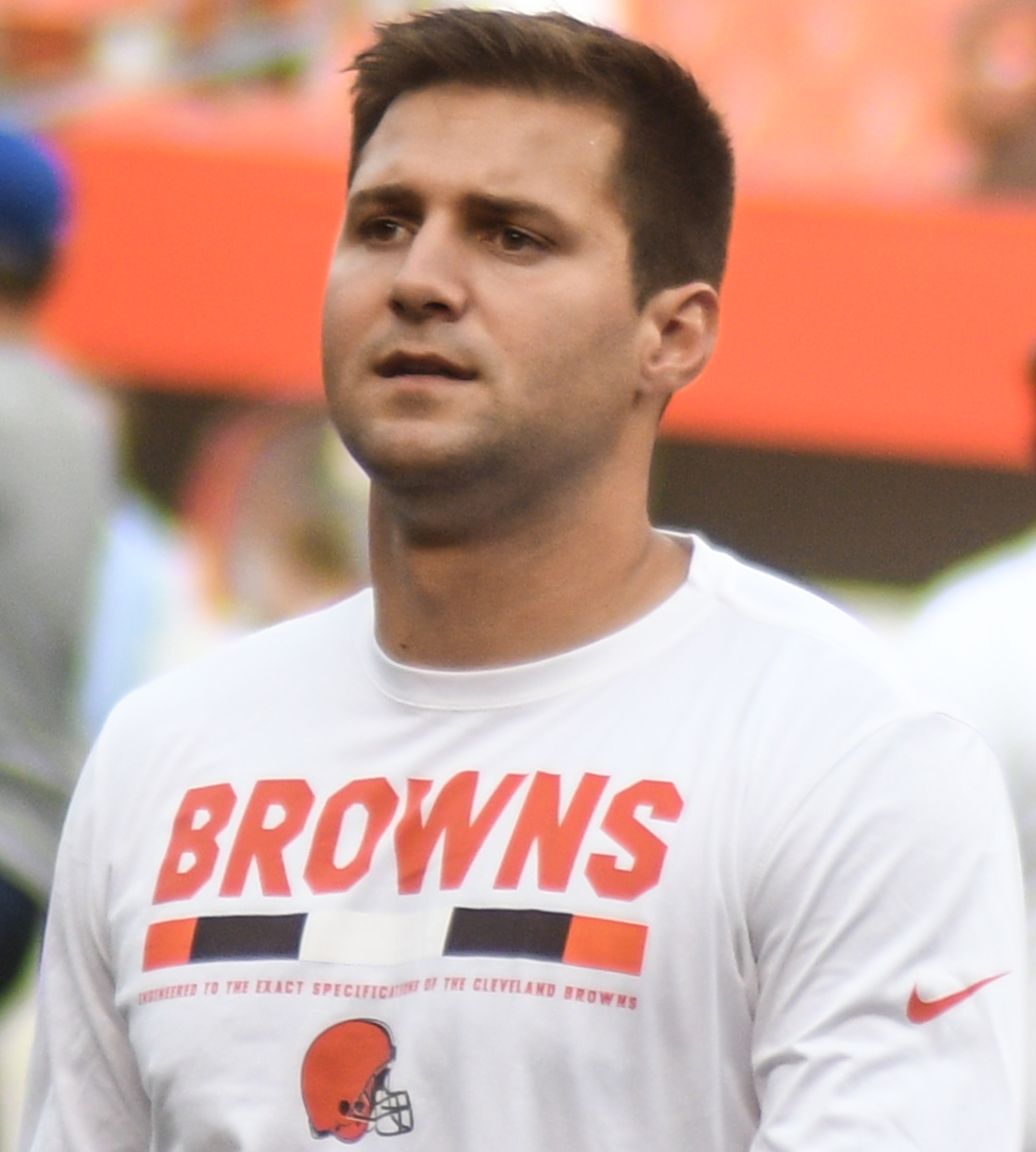
- Kessler with the Cleveland Browns in 2017

No. 6
- Position: Quarterback

Personal information
- Born: May 11, 1993 (age 33); Bakersfield, California, U.S.
- Listed height: 6 ft 1 in (1.85 m)
- Listed weight: 215 lb (98 kg)

Career information
- High school: Centennial (Bakersfield)
- College: USC (2011–2015)
- NFL draft: 2016: 3rd round, 93rd overall pick

Career history
- Cleveland Browns (2016–2017); Jacksonville Jaguars (2018); Philadelphia Eagles (2019)*; New England Patriots (2019)
- * Offseason or practice squad member only

Career NFL statistics
- Passing attempts: 349
- Passing completions: 224
- Completion percentage: 64.2%
- Passing yards: 2,215
- TD–INT: 8–5
- Passer rating: 83.7
- Stats at Pro Football Reference

Cody David Kessler (born May 11, 1993) is an American former professional football player who was a quarterback in the National Football League (NFL). He played college football for the USC Trojans and was selected by the Cleveland Browns in the third round of the 2016 NFL draft. Kessler was also a member of the Jacksonville Jaguars, Philadelphia Eagles, and New England Patriots.

== Early life ==
Kessler attended Centennial High School in Bakersfield, California, and played for Centennial's football team. As a senior, he threw for 2,831 yards and 36 touchdowns. Kessler was the California Gatorade Football Player of the Year. He was ranked as the second best pro-style quarterback recruit by Rivals.com. Kessler was teammates with Jared Norris at Centennial High School. Following his senior season, Kessler played in the U.S. Army All-American Bowl.

== College career ==
Kessler was redshirted for the 2011 season.

In 2012, Kessler was a backup to Matt Barkley. He completed two passes for nine yards in a game against Colorado in his only action of the season.

In 2013, Kessler competed with Max Wittek for the starting quarterback job. He ended up winning the job from Wittek. His first pass touchdown came in the season opener against Hawaii to Nelson Agholor for 19-yards on August 29, 2013. He was 25-for-37 for 288 yards and a touchdown in a win over Stanford to receive Pac-12 Conference Offensive Player of the Week honors. Kessler led USC to a 10–4 record, finishing the year 7–2 under interim head coaches Ed Orgeron and Clay Helton. Kessler was 22-for-30 for 345 yards with a career-best four touchdowns in the 2013 Las Vegas Bowl rout over Fresno State, and received Most Valuable Player (MVP) honors. For the season he completed 236-of-361 passes for 2,968 yards, 20 touchdowns, and seven interceptions.

In December 2013, USC hired former USC assistant and University of Washington head coach Steve Sarkisian to replace interim head coach Ed Orgeron. In an open competition, Kessler beat out Max Browne and Jalen Greene for the quarterback spot in 2014. On August 30, 2014, Kessler threw for a career-high 394 yards and accounted for four total touchdowns against Fresno State, leading to his first of three designations as Pac-12 Offensive Player of the Week. On October 18, Kessler accounted for seven touchdowns against Colorado, the most ever by a USC quarterback, leading to his second designation as Offensive Player of the week. In the final game of the regular season, he threw six touchdowns against rival Notre Dame, the most touchdowns thrown by a single quarterback against Notre Dame in the 127-year history of the program, leading one Los Angeles Times writer to label him a potential 2015 Heisman Trophy candidate. This achievement led to his third designation as Pac-12 Offensive Player of the Week, tying him with Marcus Mariota for the most designations for the 2014 season. He finished the season completing 315 of 452 passes for 3,826 yards with 39 touchdowns and five interceptions.

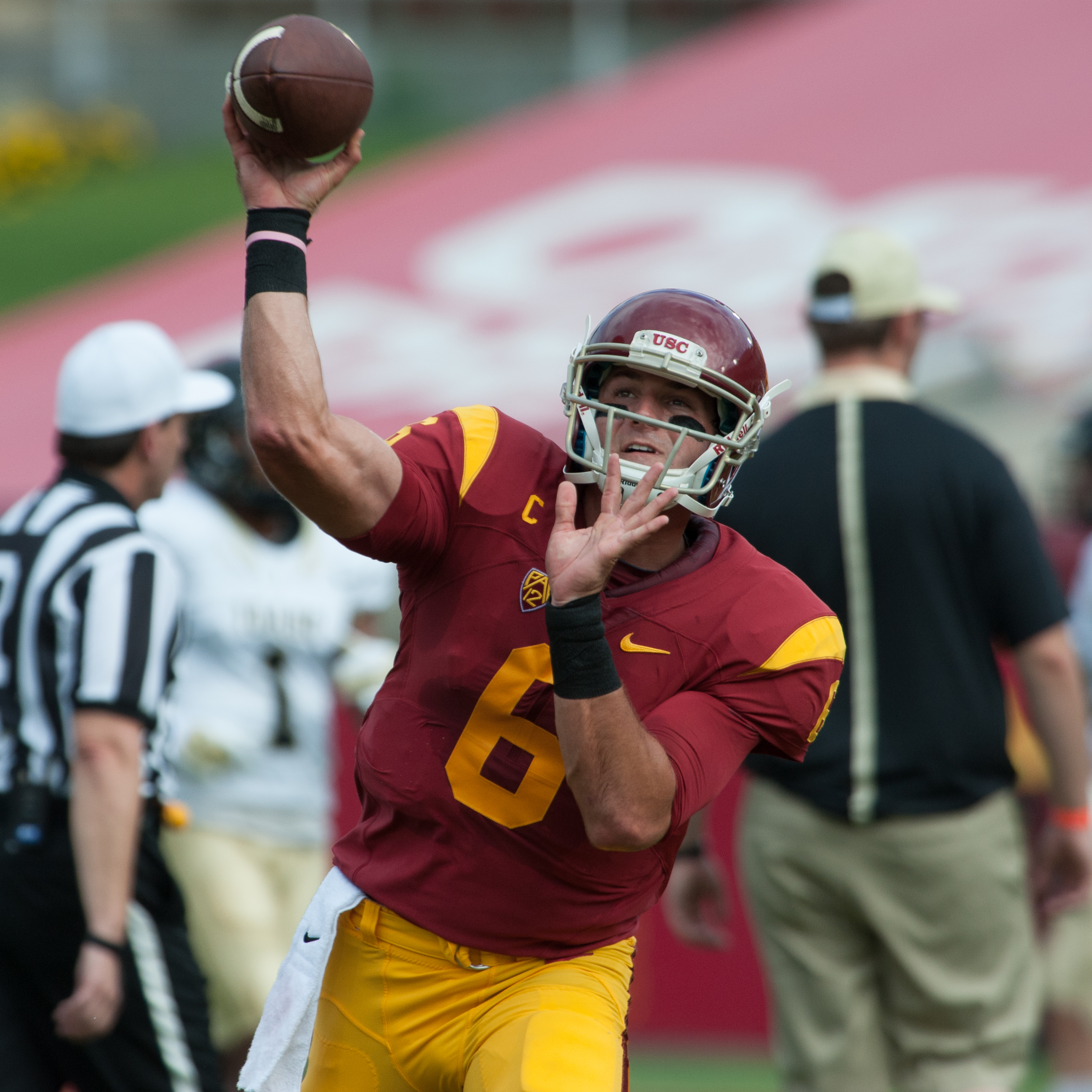
Kessler in 2015

Kessler started his final season with the Trojans off on a positive note with 240 yards and four touchdowns in a victory over Arkansas State. In the next game, he passed for 410 yards and three touchdowns in a victory over Idaho. The Trojans lost their first game in the next matchup against Stanford with Kessler having 272 yards and three touchdowns. In the next game, a victory over Arizona State, he had 375 passing yards, five touchdowns, and an interception. After that game, the Trojans went on to finish 8–4 and play Stanford for the Pac-12 Championship. In the 41–22 loss in the championship game, Kessler had 187 yards and a touchdown. In the final game of his collegiate career, the Holiday Bowl against Wisconsin, he finished with 221 yards, one touchdown, and one interception in the 23–21 loss. Overall, as a senior in the 2015 season, Kessler started all 14 games and completed 298 of 446 passes for 3,536 yards, 29 touchdowns, and seven interceptions. He finished his collegiate career with 10,339 yards, 88 touchdowns and 19 interceptions.

== Professional career ==
Pre-draft measurables
Height	Weight	Arm length	Hand span	40-yard dash	10-yard split	20-yard split	20-yard shuttle	Three-cone drill	Vertical jump	Broad jump
6 ft 1 1/4 in (1.86 m)	220 lb (100 kg)	32 5/8 in (0.83 m)	10 7/8 in (0.28 m)	4.89 s	1.63 s	2.90 s	4.00 s	7.32 s	29.5 in (0.75 m)	8 ft 8 in (2.64 m)
All values from NFL Combine

=== Cleveland Browns ===
==== 2016 ====
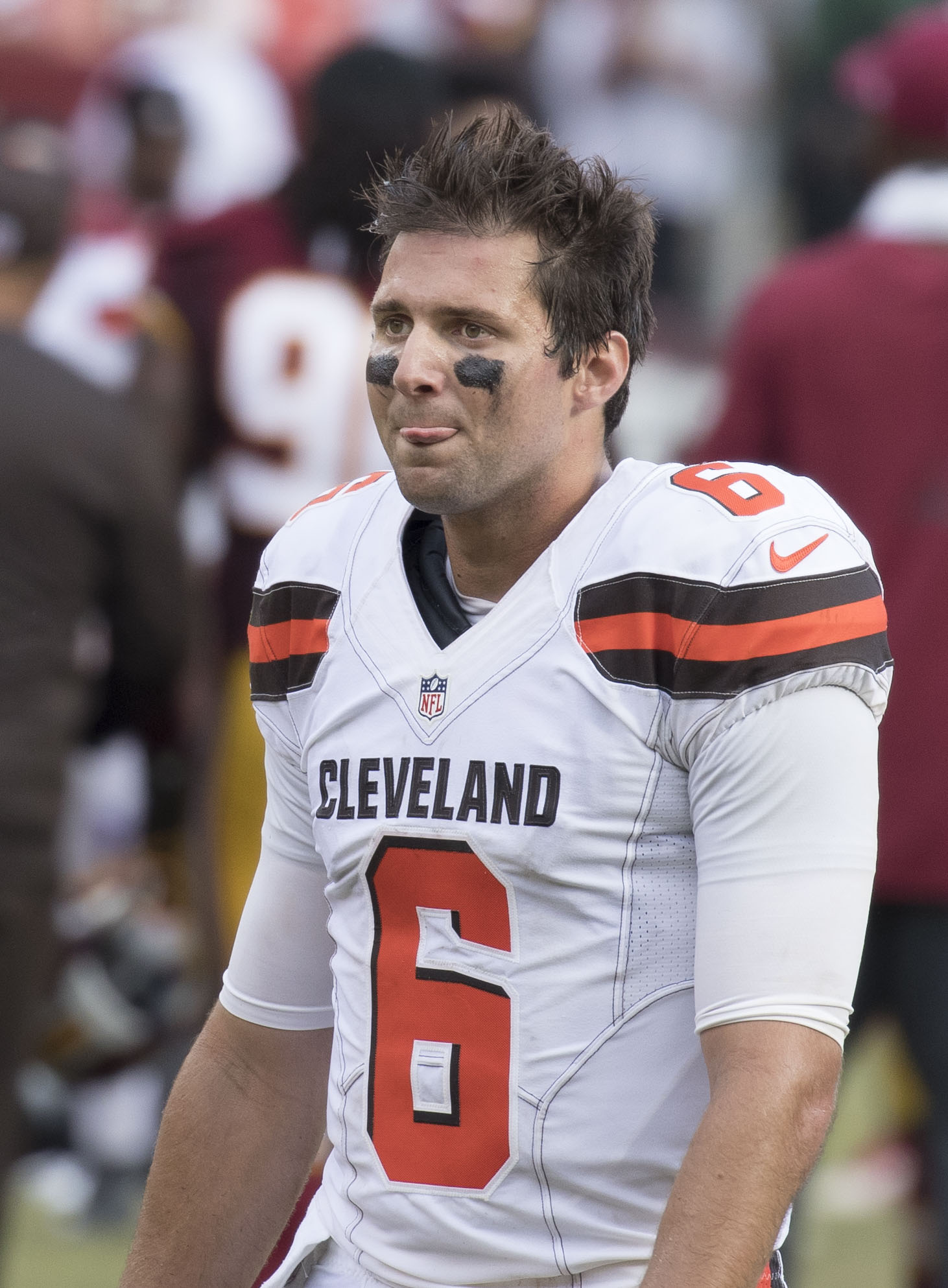
Kessler in 2016

Kessler was selected by the Cleveland Browns in the third round (93rd overall) of the 2016 NFL draft. On June 9, 2016, the Browns signed him to a four-year, $3.85 million contract with a signing bonus of $664,788.

Kessler began the 2016 season as the third-string quarterback behind Robert Griffin III and Josh McCown. He became the backup quarterback after Griffin suffered an injury during the season-opening loss to the Philadelphia Eagles. On September 25, 2016, Kessler made his first career start after McCown was injured in Week 2. Kessler finished his debut completing 21-of-33 attempts for 244 passing yards as the Browns lost to the Miami Dolphins in overtime 30–24. The following week, he earned his second consecutive start against the Washington Redskins and completed 21-of-40 pass attempts for 223 yards. Kessler fumbled twice, threw his first career touchdown on a nine-yard pass to wide receiver Terrelle Pryor, and threw his first career interception, which was intercepted by cornerback Josh Norman as the Browns lost 31–20.

On October 16, 2016, Kessler completed 26 of 41 passes for a season-high 335 yards and two touchdowns during a narrow 28–26 loss to the Tennessee Titans. The next game, he completed 9 of 11 pass attempts for 82 passing yards and suffered a concussion in the second quarter after Bengals defensive tackle Domata Peko hit him during a pitch to tight end Gary Barnidge. The Browns went on to lose to the Cincinnati Bengals 31–17 and Kessler was replaced by fellow rookie Kevin Hogan. In Week 11, Kessler made his eighth start of his rookie season against the Pittsburgh Steelers and finished the game with 7-of-14 attempts while throwing an interception. In the third quarter, while being tackled by Steelers linebacker Ryan Shazier, Kessler suffered another concussion after he was hit by Steelers inside linebacker Lawrence Timmons. The Browns went on to lose 24–9. McCown started in Kessler's place the following week and Griffin became the starting quarterback after returning from injury during Week 14. In Week 16 against the San Diego Chargers, Kessler completed 2-of-3 passes for 11 yards after entering the game with 10 minutes left in the fourth quarter after Griffin suffered an injury. The Browns beat the Chargers 20–17 to win their first and only game of the season.

Kessler finished his rookie season with 1,380 passing yards, six touchdowns, and two interceptions in nine games and eight starts.

==== 2017 ====
Kessler was inactive for the first six games of the 2017 season as the third-string quarterback behind Kevin Hogan and rookie DeShone Kizer. After Hogan suffered sore ribs during Week 6 against the Houston Texans, Kessler was elevated to second-string. During Week 7 against the Tennessee Titans, Kessler entered the game in the third quarter after Kizer was benched. Kessler then completed 10 of 19 passes for 121 yards and an interception as the Browns lost in overtime by a score of 12–9.

=== Jacksonville Jaguars ===
On March 28, 2018, Kessler was traded to the Jacksonville Jaguars for a conditional 2019 seventh-round draft pick.

On October 21, Kessler made his Jaguars debut against the Houston Texans after the team benched Blake Bortles. Kessler finished with 156 passing yards, a touchdown, and an interception in the 20–7 loss. On November 26, Kessler was named the starter for the Week 13 game against the Indianapolis Colts as the Jaguars benched incumbent starter Bortles. After a rough start to their Week 16 matchup against the Miami Dolphins, Kessler was benched in favor of Bortles for the rest of that game and for the Jaguars' final game in week 17.

On May 9, 2019, Kessler was released by the Jaguars.

=== Philadelphia Eagles ===
On May 12, 2019, the Philadelphia Eagles signed Kessler three days after being released by the Jaguars. Kessler was expected to compete with Nate Sudfeld and rookie Clayton Thorson for the backup job to Carson Wentz. On August 15, during a preseason game against the Jacksonville Jaguars, Kessler had to leave the game after taking a hit from defensive end Datone Jones. Kessler was later diagnosed with a concussion and did not return for the rest of the game. He was waived during final roster cuts on August 30.

=== New England Patriots ===
On September 25, 2019, Kessler signed with the New England Patriots. On October 15, Kessler was released, but was re-signed on October 28. On April 1, 2020, the Patriots again released Kessler.

== Career statistics ==
=== NFL ===
Legend
**Bold**	Career high

Year	Team	Games			Passing									Rushing					Sacked		Fumbles	
Year	Team	GP	GS	Record	Cmp	Att	Pct	Yds	Y/A	Lng	TD	Int	Rtg	Att	Yds	Avg	Lng	TD	Sck	SckY	Fum	Lost
2016	CLE	**9**	**8**	0–8	**128**	**195**	**65.6**	**1,380**	**7.1**	**44**	**6**	**2**	**92.3**	11	18	1.6	8	0	21	140	4	1
2017	CLE	3	0	—	11	23	47.8	126	5.5	31	0	1	46.6	1	−1	−1.0	−1	0	6	48	0	0
2018	JAX	5	4	**2–2**	85	131	64.9	709	5.4	35	2	**2**	77.4	**19**	**123**	**6.5**	**21**	0	**22**	**149**	**5**	**3**
2019	NE	0	0	—	DNP																	
Career		17	12	2–10	224	349	64.2	2,215	6.3	44	8	5	83.7	31	140	4.5	21	0	49	337	9	4

=== College ===
Season	Team	Passing								Rushing			
Season	Team	Cmp	Att	Pct	Yds	Y/A	TD	Int	Rtg	Att	Yds	Avg	TD
2012	USC	2	2	100.0	9	4.5	0	0	137.8	0	0	0.0	0
2013	USC	236	361	65.4	2,968	8.2	20	7	148.8	42	−124	−3.0	1
2014	USC	315	452	69.7	3,826	8.5	39	5	167.1	55	−152	−2.8	2
2015	USC	298	446	66.8	3,536	7.9	29	7	151.7	61	−149	−2.4	4
Career		851	1,261	67.5	10,339	8.2	88	19	156.4	158	−425	−2.7	7

== Media career ==
Kessler has hosted various programs for the USC Media Network, such as The Victory Podcast and Trojans Live: Football Roundtable.

In 2026, he became an analyst for NFL Network and CW College Football's Mountain West Conference coverage.
