= Derrick Green (American football) =

American football player (born 1994)

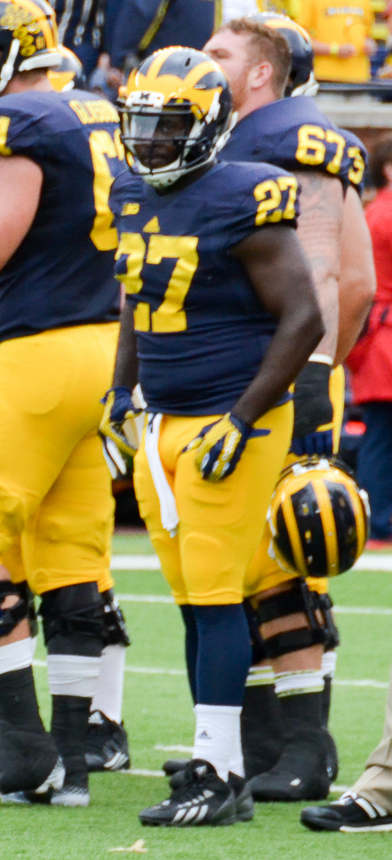
- Green in 2015

No. 27
- Position: Running back

Personal information
- Born: February 21, 1994 (age 32)
- Listed height: 5 ft 10 in (1.78 m)
- Listed weight: 220 lb (100 kg)

Career information
- High school: Hermitage (Henrico, Virginia)
- College: TCU; Michigan
- Stats at Pro Football Reference

Derrick Shaqueill Green (born February 21, 1994) is an American former football running back. He was rated by Rivals.com and Scout.com as the No. 1 running back in the country and by Rivals.com as the No. 8 overall player in the Class of 2013. He played for the Michigan Wolverines football football team from 2013 to 2015, amassing 898 yards and scoring seven touchdowns on 212 carries. In January 2016, the University of Michigan granted Green a transfer release, enabling him to continue his football career at another institution following his graduation in spring 2016.

== Early life ==
Green was born in February 1994 and grew up in Richmond, Virginia. He played high school football at Hermitage High School. He began his football career as a "chunky high school freshman" and a 268-pound, 5 foot, 8 inch lineman. Over the next two years, he shed more than 50 pounds working on his diet along with his parents, Chris and Fran Green. By his junior year in 2011, Green had become one of the leading running backs in the country, rushing for over 1,500 yards and 20 touchdowns. Interviewed by ESPN in May 2012, Green described his running style as follows:

"I was always downhill. If you look at my film, I'm not really a bounce guy. I'm a one-cut-and-go, real straight, north-south runner and I have the speed to kick it up in sixth gear. All that bouncing and shaking, I wouldn't say that was me. If you're in the way, I'm going to blow you up. I'm not going to try to shake you. At my school, they call me 'The Freight Train.' I like that a lot. I'm going to run you over and let you know I'm here. I'm coming."

As a senior, he rushed for 1,350 yards and 21 touchdowns.

== Recruiting ==
Green was one of the most highly recruited players in the Class of 2013 – the group of players graduating high school and entering college in the year 2013. Green was rated by Rivals.com and Scout.com as the No. 1 running back in the country and by Rivals.com as the No. 8 overall player in the Class of 2013. Rival.com recruiting analyst Josh Helmholt described Green as "a downhill runner, a between-the-tackles guy."

In July 2012, Green attended The Opening (Nike Combine) in Beaverton, Oregon. By that time, he had received scholarship offers from 40 universities and had narrowed his list to 13 schools: Tennessee, Michigan, Oregon, Ohio State, Ole Miss, Virginia Tech, Auburn, Clemson, Alabama, Miami, Pitt, Oklahoma State and Oklahoma.

In mid-January 2013, Green announced that he had narrowed his choice to three schools – Auburn, Michigan and Tennessee. When Green called a press conference in late January 2013, it was web cast live by the Richmond Times-Dispatch. At the press conference, Green announced that he had verbally committed to play for the University of Michigan. He initially reached for a Michigan hat, then a Tennessee hat, and finally flipped a switch which prompted a screen to reveal a Michigan Wolverines football jersey.

== University of Michigan ==
Green was the highest-rated running back signed by Michigan since 2006. Tom Luginbill on ESPN called Green's commitment "a defining moment for Michigan," noting that he "fits with what Brady Hoke and the staff want not only the identity of the offense to be but the identity of their program – physical, grind it out, pound away at you over the course of four quarters, wear you down. Derrick Green can wear down an opponent. He is physical. He's explosive. ... This is a guy they can build what they want their offense to be about."

=== 2013 season ===
In the weeks leading up to the 2013 season, ESPN rated Green as one of its five Big Ten Conference first-year players to watch, one its Top 10 future college football stars, and the running back on its pre-season freshman All-American team. Commentator Phil Steele even picked Green as his pre-season All-Big Ten running back. Others raised doubts as to whether Michigan head coach Brady Hoke would bench veteran Fitzgerald Toussaint in order to get Green into the lineup.

During pre-season practice in August 2013, Green reported to camp at 240 pounds, raising questions about a 20-pound weight gain since his senior season in high school. Running backs coach Fred Jackson predicted he would be down to 230 pounds by the time the season started. Jackson dismissed concerns about Green's weight: "He's going to be as advertised. ... He's a big guy. Look at him from the back and the side, he's a huge human being."

After being held out of practice for a week following an undisclosed injury, Green found himself in competition with Fitzgerald Toussaint for the role as Michigan's No. 1 running back. Michigan offensive coordinator Al Borges described his approach to using Green: "Teach him the run game and then teach him the pass game in pieces so you can then be functional as you go. You can play a freshman running back as long as you don't inundate him with so much information that it becomes disinformation, you know. But I've had a bunch of tailbacks come in and play as freshmen and didn't give them too much. But by the fifth, sixth game of the season, they could handle all of it. Very few could handle it in game one."

=== 2014 season ===
Prior to the start of the 2014 season, Green was in competition with De'Veon Smith to become the Wolverines' starter at running back.

In the opening game of the 2014 season, a 52–14 victory over Appalachian State, Green carried the ball 15 times for 170 yards, an average of 11.3 yards per carry. He also scored a touchdown and had a career-long run of 62 yards. De'Veon Smith also rushed for 115 yards in the game, as Green and Smith became the first pair of Michigan running backs to rush for over 100 yards in the same game since 2007.

During the second week of the 2014 season, Green was held to 25 yards on 13 carries (1.9 yards per carry) in a 31–0 loss to Notre Dame. He rebounded in the third week of the season with 137 yards and two touchdowns on 22 carries (6.2 yards per carry) in a 34–10 victory over Miami (Ohio). On October 4, 2014, in a game against Rutgers, Green broke his clavicle in the fourth quarter.

=== 2015 season ===
In 12 games during the 2015 season, Green had 47 carries for 157 yards and two touchdowns. On January 15, 2016, Michigan announced that it had granted a transfer release to Green, allowing him to play for another program after graduating in the spring of 2016.

=== 2016 season ===
Green transferred to TCU for the 2016 season. He played in 10 games, rushing 38 times for 141 yards and two touchdowns.

Pre-draft measurables
Height	Weight	Arm length	Hand span	40-yard dash	10-yard split	20-yard split	20-yard shuttle	Three-cone drill	Vertical jump	Broad jump	Bench press
5 ft 10 1/4 in (1.78 m)	220 lb (100 kg)	31 in (0.79 m)	9 in (0.23 m)	4.76 s	1.61 s	2.72 s	4.40 s	7.12 s	29.5 in (0.75 m)	9 ft 3 in (2.82 m)	15 reps
All values from Pro Day
