= Hiva Lutui =

American football player (born 1994)

No. 55
- Position: Guard

Personal information
- Born: March 25, 1994 (age 32); Euless, Texas, U.S.
- Listed height: 6 ft 1 in (1.85 m)
- Listed weight: 295 lb (134 kg)

Career information
- High school: Euless (TX) Trinity
- College: Utah (2012–2015)

Awards and highlights
- USA Today High School All-American (2011)
- Stats at ESPN

Hiva Lutui (/ˈhiːvə luːˈtuːi/ HEE-və loo-TOO-ee; born March 25, 1994) is an American former football offensive guard. He attended the University of Utah.

A native of Euless, Texas, Lutui attended Trinity High School, where he was a first-team all-state Class 5A offensive lineman in 2010 and 2011. Lutui had 143 knockdowns and 42 pancakes as a junior, and 114 knockdowns, 43 pancakes, a 90% overall grade with no sacks allowed as a senior. He was a key cog on one of the best rushing offenses in Texas in 2010 and 2011, helping Euless Trinity to the 2010 Class 5A Division I state championship game, where they were upset by Pearland 24–28 at Cowboys Stadium in Arlington. Behind Lutui, Trinity's ground attack rushed for over 325 yards per game in back-to-back seasons.

Regarded as a three-star recruit by Rivals.com, Lutui was ranked as the No. 31 offensive guard in his class. He had offers from USC, UCLA, and Utah, among others, and originally committed to UCLA. In January 2012, he decommitted, and switched to Utah.

On July 12, 2016, after suffering an ACL injury during spring football, it was announced that Lutui would end his playing career with Utah.
