= Centennial High School (Bakersfield, California) =

Public high school in California, United States

Location
- 8601 Hageman Road; Bakersfield, Kern County, California 93312; United States; 35°23′56″N 119°5′49″W

Information
- School type: Public
- Motto: H.A.W.K.S Honest, Ambitious, Well Rounded, Kind, Spirited
- Opened: 1993
- School district: Kern High School District
- Principal: Ryan Coleman
- Teaching staff: 87.96
- Grades: 9-12
- Enrollment: 2,212 (2024-2025)
- Student to teacher ratio: 25.15
- Campus type: Suburban
- Colors: Red,Gold and White
- Slogan: Home of the Golden Hawks
- Athletics conference: South Yosemite River League
- Mascot: Golden Hawks, Hawks, G-Hawks
- Newspaper: The Hawk Eye
- Website: http://centennial.kernhigh.org/

Centennial High School is a public high school located in Bakersfield, California, United States. The school's opening in 1993 marked the 100-year anniversary of the Kern High School District. Centennial is the home of many nationally recognized extra-curricular academic programs, including Virtual Business and We The People, both of which have finished ranked in the top five nationally in the school's history. In 2011, Centennial was recognized as a California Distinguished School for achieving an Academic Performance Index score of 850, the highest in the Kern High School District.

Centennial's boys and girls athletic teams are known as the Golden Hawks. As part of the South Yosemite River League, the Golden Hawks compete in baseball, basketball, cross country, football, soccer, swimming & diving, tennis, track & field, volleyball, and wrestling. Centennial's athletic teams have won numerous league and CIF Central Section championships. The girls varsity volleyball team won the California state championship in 1996.

== Notable alumni and faculty ==
- Matt Barnes (soccer), former head coach of the Turks and Caicos Islands Men's National Soccer Team
- Corbin Burnes, MLB pitcher
- Cody Kessler, NFL quarterback
- Megan Langenfeld, softball player
- Jarret Martin, minor league baseball player
- Brent Morel, former MLB third baseman
- Jared Norris, NFL linebacker
