= USA Today All-USA High School Football Team (1982–1989) =

USA Today named its first All-USA High School Football Team in 1982. The newspaper has named a team every year since 1982.

In addition, two members of the team are named the USA Today High School Offensive Player and Defensive Player of the Year, respectively. The newspaper also selects a USA Today High School Football Coach of the Year.

== Teams ==
=== 1982 team ===
Coach of the Year: Steve Klonne (Moeller High School, Cincinnati, Ohio)

Note: Bold denotes Offensive and Defensive Players of the Year, respectively, and ^{‡} denotes high school juniors

Offense

Player	Position	School	Hometown	College
**John Paye**	**Quarterback**	**Menlo School**	Menlo Park, California	Stanford
Hiawatha Francisco	Running back	Moeller High School	Cincinnati, Ohio	Notre Dame
Kirk Jones	Running back	Poly High School	Long Beach, California	UNLV
Jeff Atkins	Running back	Eastern Hills High School	Fort Worth, Texas	SMU
Jeff Zimmerman	Offensive line	Maynard Evans High School	Orlando, Florida	Florida
Terence Mann	Offensive line	Cooley High School	Detroit, Michigan	SMU
Glen Mogle	Offensive line	Riverview High School	Sarasota, Florida	Michigan
Curt Jarvis	Offensive line	Gardendale High School	Gardendale, Alabama	Alabama
Mike McGann	Offensive line	Joliet Catholic Academy	Joliet, Illinois	St. Francis
Alvin Miller	Wide receiver	Kirkwood High School	St. Louis, Missouri	Notre Dame
Tyrone Vaughans	Wide receiver	John Ehret High School	Marrero, Louisiana	Tulane
Scott Webb	Placekicker	Helix High School	La Mesa, California	San Diego State

Defense

Player	Position	School	Hometown	College
**Henry Harris**	**Linebacker**	**Columbia High School**	Decatur, Georgia	Georgia
John Hazzard	Defensive line	Jesuit High School	New Orleans, Louisiana	LSU
Chuck Williams	Defensive line	Freedom High School	Freedom, Pennsylvania	Pittsburgh
Tim Manoa	Defensive line	North Allegheny High School	Wexford, Pennsylvania	Penn State
Alonzo Highsmith	Defensive line	Columbus High School	Miami, Florida	Miami (FL)
Stan Woods	Linebacker	Seton Hall Prep School	South Orange, New Jersey	Pittsburgh
Keith Davis	Linebacker	Santa Monica High School	Santa Monica, California	USC
David Stanley	Linebacker	Angleton High School	Angleton, Texas	SMU
Miles Smith	Defensive back	Roswell High School	Roswell, Georgia	Georgia
Eric Kumerow	Defensive back	Oak Park and River Forest High School	Oak Park, Illinois	Ohio State
Rod Woodson	Defensive back	Snider High School	Fort Wayne, Indiana	Purdue
Van Tiffin	Punter	Red Bay High School	Red Bay, Alabama	Alabama

=== 1983 team ===
Coach of the Year: George Curry (Berwick High School, Berwick, Pennsylvania)

Note: Bold denotes Offensive and Defensive Players of the Year, respectively, and ^{‡} denotes high school juniors

Offense

Player	Position	School	Hometown	College
**Ryan Knight**	**Running back**	**Rubidoux High School**	Riverside, California	USC
Vince Sutton	Quarterback	LaGrange High School	LaGrange, Georgia	Alabama
Craig Heyward	Running back	Passaic High School	Passaic, New Jersey	Pittsburgh
Thurman Thomas	Running back	Willowridge High School	Houston, Texas	Oklahoma State
Sean Stopperich	Offensive line	Canon-McMillan High School	Canonsburg, Pennsylvania	SMU
Andy Sinclair	Offensive line	Edison High School	Huntington Beach, California	Stanford
Carter Hill	Offensive line	Central High School	Naperville, Illinois	Texas
David Richards	Offensive line	Highland Park High School	Dallas, Texas	SMU
David Williams	Offensive line	Lakeland High School	Lakeland, Florida	Florida
Freddy Weygand	Wide receiver	Emma Sansom High School	Gadsden, Alabama	Auburn
Alex Higdon	Wide receiver	Princeton High School	Cincinnati, Ohio	Ohio State
Erik Affholter	Placekicker	Oak Park High School	Agoura, California	USC

Defense

Player	Position	School	Hometown	College
**Ron Stallworth**	**Defensive line**	**Woodham High School**	Pensacola, Florida	Auburn
Pete Curkendall	Defensive line	Southside High School	Elmira, New York	Penn State
Richard Pryor	Defensive line	Elizabeth High School	Elizabeth, New Jersey	Iowa
Tracy Rocker	Defensive line	Fulton High School	Atlanta, Georgia	Auburn
Matt Dingens	Defensive line	Brother Rice High School	Birmingham, Michigan	Notre Dame
Frank Stams	Linebacker	St. Vincent – St. Mary High School	Akron, Ohio	Notre Dame
Cedric Figaro	Linebacker	Lafayette High School	Lafayette, Louisiana	Notre Dame
Chris Spielman	Linebacker	Washington High School	Massillon, Ohio	Ohio State
Brandy Wells	Defensive back	Montclair High School	Montclair, New Jersey	Notre Dame
Charles Washington	Defensive back	Spruce High School	Dallas, Texas	Texas
Randy Thornton	Defensive back	West Jefferson High School	Harvey, Louisiana	Houston
Tom Tupa	Punter	Brecksville High School	Broadview Heights, Ohio	Ohio State

=== 1984 team ===
Coach of the Year: Nick Hyder (Valdosta High School, Valdosta, Georgia)

Note: Bold denotes Offensive and Defensive Players of the Year, respectively, and ^{‡} denotes high school juniors

Offense

Player	Position	School	Hometown	College
**Hart Lee Dykes**	**Wide receiver**	**Bay City High School**	Bay City, Texas	Oklahoma State
Todd Ellis	Quarterback	Page High School	Greensboro, North Carolina	South Carolina
Brian Davis	Running back	Washington High School	Washington, Pennsylvania	Pittsburgh
Aaron Emanuel	Running back	Quartz Hill High School	Quartz Hill, California	USC
Sammie Smith	Running back	Apopka High School	Apopka, Florida	Florida State
Eric Still	Offensive line	Germantown High School	Germantown, Tennessee	Tennessee
Mark VanKeirsbilck	Offensive line	Rockhurst High School	Kansas City, Missouri	Oklahoma
Chris Pettaway	Offensive line	American High School	Hialeah, Florida	LSU
Rick Meyer	Offensive line	Salinas High School	Salinas, California	UCLA
Mark Stepnoski	Offensive line	Cathedral Prep School	Erie, Pennsylvania	Pittsburgh
Marlon Washington	Wide receiver	Schlagle High School	Kansas City, Kansas	USC
Kevin Mills	Placekicker	Shore Regional High School	West Long Beach, New Jersey	Penn State

Defense

Player	Position	School	Hometown	College
**Quintus McDonald**	**Linebacker**	**Montclair High School**	Montclair, New Jersey	Penn State
Sean Ridley	Defensive line	Central High School	Omaha, Nebraska	Iowa
Ray Huckestein	Defensive line	North Allegheny High School	Wexford, Pennsylvania	Stanford
Brent White	Defensive line	Stebbins High School	Dayton, Ohio	Michigan
Anthony Butts	Defensive line	Fulton High School	Atlanta, Georgia	Mississippi State
Larry Rose	Defensive line	Emma Sansom High School	Gadsden, Alabama	Alabama
Ned Bolcar	Linebacker	Phillipsburg High School	Phillipsburg, New Jersey	Notre Dame
John Porter	Linebacker	Valdosta High School	Valdosta, Georgia	Georgia Tech
Scott Thompson	Defensive back	Cascade High School	Everett, Washington	Oklahoma
Mark Green	Defensive back	Poly High School	Riverside, California	Notre Dame
Melvin Gilliam	Defensive back	Booker T. Washington High School	Tulsa, Oklahoma	Oklahoma State
Scott Johnston	Punter	Stranahan High School	Fort Lauderdale, Florida	Florida State

=== 1985 team ===
Coach of the Year: Bob Shannon (East St. Louis High School, East St. Louis, Illinois)

Note: Bold denotes Offensive and Defensive Players of the Year, respectively, and ^{‡} denotes high school juniors

Offense

Player	Position	School	Hometown	College
**Jeff George**	**Quarterback**	**Warren Central High School**	Indianapolis, Indiana	Purdue/Illinois
Tony Stewart	Running back	Union High School	Union, New Jersey	Iowa
Tony Van Zant	Running back	Central High School	Hazelwood, Missouri	Missouri
Harvey Williams	Running back	Hempstead High School	Hempstead, Texas	LSU
Brad Johnson	Offensive line	Cherokee County High School	Centre, Alabama	Auburn
Lance Zeno	Offensive line	Fountain Valley High School	Fountain Valley, California	UCLA
Jeff Pearson	Offensive line	St. Laurence High School	Burbank, Illinois	Michigan State
Dave Szott	Offensive line	Clifton High School	Clifton, New Jersey	Penn State
Nigel Clay	Offensive line	Fontana High School	Fontana, California	Oklahoma
Greg McMurtry	Wide receiver	Brockton High School	Brockton, Massachusetts	Michigan
Percy Waddle	Wide receiver	Columbus High School	Columbus, Texas	Texas A&M
Mike Cortright	Placekicker	St. Mary's High School	Phoenix, Arizona	junior college

Defense

Player	Position	School	Hometown	College
**John Foley**	**Linebacker**	**St. Rita High School**	Chicago, Illinois	Notre Dame
Warde Manuel	Defensive line	Brother Martin High School	New Orleans, Louisiana	Michigan
Mark Keough	Defensive line	East High School	Hazelwood, Missouri	Lincoln University of Missouri
Paul Glonek	Defensive line	St. Laurence High School	Burbank, Illinois	Arizona
Dennis Brown	Defensive line	Jordan High School	Long Beach, California	Washington
Zarek Peters	Defensive line	Willowridge High School	Missouri City, Texas	Oklahoma
Brent Collins	Linebacker	Jefferson County High School	Dandridge, Tennessee	Georgia
Melvin Foster	Linebacker	Yates High School	Houston, Texas	Iowa
Vada Murray	Defensive back	Moeller High School	Cincinnati, Ohio	Michigan
Mark Carrier	Defensive back	Poly High School	Long Beach, California	USC
Anthony Burnette	Defensive back	Lynwood High School	Lynwood, California	UCLA
John Zaleski	Punter	St. Rita High School	Troy, Michigan	Notre Dame

=== 1986 team ===
Coach of the Year: Spence McCracken (Robert E. Lee High School, Montgomery, Alabama)

Note: Bold denotes Offensive and Defensive Players of the Year, respectively, and ^{‡} denotes high school juniors

Offense

Player	Position	School	Hometown	College
**Emmitt Smith**	**Running back**	**Escambia High School**	Pensacola, Florida	Florida
Mickey Joseph	Quarterback	Archbishop Shaw High School	Marrero, Louisiana	Nebraska
Darren Lewis	Running back	Carter High School	Dallas, Texas	Texas A&M
Ricky Watters	Running back	Bishop McDevitt High School	Harrisburg, Pennsylvania	Notre Dame
Kelvin Hankins	Offensive line	Wilson High School	Camden, New Jersey	Clemson
Greg Skrepenak	Offensive line	G.A.R. Memorial High School	Wilkes-Barre, Pennsylvania	Michigan
Dean Dingman	Offensive line	East Troy High School	East Troy, Wisconsin	Michigan
Brian Kelly	Offensive line	South High School	Torrance, California	UCLA
Greg Lakin	Offensive line	Cypress-Fairbanks High School	Houston, Texas	Texas A&M
Nate Turner	Wide receiver	Mount Carmel High School	Chicago, Illinois	Nebraska
Johnny Walker	Wide receiver	Holmes High School	San Antonio, Texas	Texas
Philip Doyle	Placekicker	Huffman High School	Birmingham, Alabama	Alabama

Defense

Player	Position	School	Hometown	College
**Marc Spindler**	**Defensive line**	**West Scranton High School**	Scranton, Pennsylvania	Pittsburgh
Alfred Williams	Defensive line	Jones High School	Houston, Texas	Colorado
David Rocker	Defensive line	Fulton High School	Atlanta, Georgia	Auburn
John Johnson	Defensive line	LaGrange High School	LaGrange, Georgia	Clemson
Stacey Dillard	Defensive line	Clarksville High School	Clarksville, Texas	Oklahoma
Matt Darby	Linebacker	Green Run High School	Virginia Beach, Virginia	UCLA
Sean Howard	Linebacker	Crespi Carmelite High School	Encino, California	UCLA
Pat Stant	Linebacker	Brother Martin High School	New Orleans, Louisiana	Tulane
Cory Booker	Defensive back	Northern Valley High School	Old Tappan, New Jersey	Stanford
Leroy Thompson	Defensive back	Austin-East High School	Knoxville, Tennessee	Penn State
Louis Riddick	Defensive back	Pennridge High School	Perkasie, Pennsylvania	Pittsburgh
Josh Butland	Punter	Troy High School	Troy, Michigan	Michigan State

=== 1987 team ===
Coach of the Year: Jack McCurry (North Hills High School, Pittsburgh, Pennsylvania)

Note: Bold denotes Offensive and Defensive Players of the Year, respectively, and ^{‡} denotes high school juniors

Offense

Player	Position	School	Hometown	College
**Todd Marinovich**	**Quarterback**	**Capistrano Valley High School**	Mission Viejo, California	USC
Kevin Williams	Running back	Spring High School	Spring, Texas	UCLA
Russell White	Running back	Crespi Carmelite High School	Encino, California	California
Chuck Webb	Running back	Macomber High School	Toledo, Ohio	Tennessee
Mike LiVorio	Offensive line	Gateway High School	Monroeville, Pennsylvania	Pittsburgh
Gene McGuire	Offensive line	Mosley High School	Panama City, Florida	Notre Dame
Tony Delazio	Offensive line	Whitehall High School	Whitehall, Pennsylvania	Pittsburgh
Brian Jacobs	Offensive line	Hart High School	Santa Clarita, California	UCLA
Ed King	Offensive line	Phenix City High School	Phenix City, Alabama	Auburn
Derek Brown	Wide receiver	Merritt Island High School	Merritt Island, Florida	Notre Dame
Ronnie Johnson	Wide receiver	La Marque High School	La Marque, Texas	Houston
Chris Gardocki	Placekicker	Redan High School	Stone Mountain, Georgia	Clemson

Defense

Player	Position	School	Hometown	College
**Todd Collins**	**Linebacker**	**Jefferson County High School**	Dandridge, Tennessee	Tennessee/Georgia/Carson-Newman
Tommy Jeter	Defensive line	Deer Park High School	Deer Park, Texas	Texas
Mike Lustyk	Defensive line	Interlake High School	Bellevue, Washington	Washington
Tim Cromartie	Defensive line	Godby High School	Tallahassee, Florida	Auburn
Randy Hall	Defensive line	Halls High School	Knoxville, Tennessee	Tennessee
Mario Johnson	Defensive line	Central High School	Hazelwood, Missouri	Missouri
Curtis Bray	Linebacker	Gateway High School	Monroeville, Pennsylvania	Pittsburgh
Mike Chalenski	Linebacker	Brearley High School	Kenilworth, New Jersey	UCLA
Baron Jackson	Defensive back	Southern Laboratory School	Baton Rouge, Louisiana	Southern
Arnold Laws	Defensive back	Cordova High School	Rancho Cordova, California	Arizona State
Graylin Johnson	Defensive back	Austin High School	Port Arthur, Texas	Texas
Ron Dale	Punter	Boulder City High School	Boulder City, Nevada	USC

=== 1988 team ===
Coach of the Year: Carl Madison (Pine Forest High School, Pensacola, Florida)

Note: Bold denotes Offensive and Defensive Players of the Year, respectively, and ^{‡} denotes high school juniors

Offense

Player	Position	School	Hometown	College
**Terry Kirby**	**Running back**	**Tabb High School**	Tabb, Virginia	Virginia
Rick Mirer	Quarterback	Goshen High School	Goshen, Indiana	Notre Dame
Derek Brown	Running back	Servite High School	Anaheim, California	Nebraska
Rudy Harris	Running back	Brockton High School	Brockton, Massachusetts	Clemson
Bob Whitfield	Offensive line	Banning High School	Wilmington, California	Stanford
Mike Wells	Offensive line	Arnold High School	Arnold, Missouri	Iowa
Rudy Barber	Offensive line	Carol City High School	Miami, Florida	Miami (FL)
Stuart Tyner	Offensive line	Tomball High School	Tomball, Texas	Notre Dame
Chet Lacheta	Offensive line	Bloom High School	Chicago Heights, Illinois	Notre Dame
Pedro Cherry	Wide Receiver	Bertie High School	Windsor, North Carolina	Auburn
Kevin Williams	Wide receiver	Roosevelt High School	Dallas, Texas	Miami (FL)
Craig Hentrich	Placekicker	Marquette High School	Alton, Illinois	Notre Dame

Defense

Player	Position	School	Hometown	College
**Sean Gilbert**	**Linebacker**	**Aliquippa High School**	Aliquippa, Pennsylvania	Pittsburgh
Alonzo Spellman	Defensive line	Rancocas Valley Regional High School	Mount Holly, New Jersey	Ohio State
Chuck Jones	Defensive line	Chillicothe High School	Chillicothe, Ohio	None
Sterling Palmer	Defensive line	St. Thomas Aquinas High School	Fort Lauderdale, Florida	Florida State
Tamasi Amituanai	Defensive line	Vista High School	San Diego, California	Colorado
Eric Shaw	Defensive line	Pensacola High School	Pensacola, Florida	Louisiana Tech
Richard McKenzie	Linebacker	Boyd Anderson High School	Lauderdale Lakes, Florida	Penn State
Jesse Armstead	Linebacker	Carter High School	Dallas, Texas	Miami (FL)
Marcel Brown	Defensive back	Point Loma High School	San Diego, California	USC
Grady Cavnness	Defensive back	Willowridge High School	Sugar Land, Texas	Texas
Johnny Davis	Defensive back	Pahokee High School	Pahokee, Florida	Florida State
Paul Stonehouse	Punter	Loyola High School	Los Angeles, California	Stanford

=== 1989 team ===
Coach of the Year: Chuck Kyle (St. Ignatius High School, Cleveland, Ohio)

Note: Bold denotes Offensive and Defensive Players of the Year, respectively, and ^{‡} denotes high school juniors

Offense

Player	Position	School	Hometown	College
**Andre Hastings**	**Wide receiver**	**Morrow High School**	Morrow, Georgia	Georgia
Chris Weinke	Quarterback	Cretin-Derham Hall High School	St. Paul, Minnesota	Florida State
Calvin Jones	Running back	Central High School	Omaha, Nebraska	Nebraska
Robert Smith	Running back	Euclid High School	Euclid, Ohio	Ohio State
Ricky Powers	Running back	Buchtel High School	Akron, Ohio	Michigan
Matt Neenan	Offensive line	Williamsport Area High School	Williamsport, Pennsylvania	Syracuse
Aaron Taylor	Offensive line	De La Salle High School	Concord, California	Notre Dame
Mike McGlinn	Offensive line	Rockhurst High School	Kansas City, Missouri	Notre Dame
John Richard	Offensive line	Lamar High School	Houston, Texas	Texas A&M
Steve Roberts	Offensive line	Dalton High School	Dalton, Georgia	Georgia
Kyle Brady	Wide receiver	Cedar Cliff High School	Camp Hill, Pennsylvania	Penn State
Marty Simpson	Placekicker	Spring Valley High School	Columbia, South Carolina	South Carolina

Defense

Player	Position	School	Hometown	College
**Oliver Gibson**	**Linebacker**	**Romeoville High School**	Romeoville, Illinois	Notre Dame
Reuben Brown	Defensive line	E. C. Glass High School	Lynchburg, Virginia	Pittsburgh
Bernard Williams	Defensive line	Hamilton High School	Memphis, Tennessee	Georgia
Mitch Davis	Defensive line	Vigor High School	Prichard, Alabama	Georgia
Brian Hamilton	Defensive line	St. Rita High School	Chicago, Illinois	Notre Dame
Tashe Williams	Defensive line	Air Academy High School	Colorado Springs, Colorado	Northern Colorado
Marvin Jones	Linebacker	Northwestern High School	Miami, Florida	Florida State
Bruce Walker	Linebacker	Dominguez High School	Compton, California	UCLA
Othello Henderson	Defensive back	Ellison High School	Killeen, Texas	UCLA
Larry Kennedy	Defensive back	Riverview High School	Sarasota, Florida	Florida
Willie Guy	Defensive back	East High School	Memphis, Tennessee	Iowa
Mike Thomas	Punter	Richmond County High School	Rockingham, North Carolina	North Carolina

== See also ==
- USA Today High School Football Offensive Player of the Year
