= USA Today High School Football Player of the Year =

Annual athletic award

The USA Today High School Football Player of the Year is the award given by USA Today to the best offensive and defensive high school football players in America.

The award has been given since 1982, the year the newspaper began, and each player was part of the USA Today All-USA high school football team .

== Winners ==
=== Offense ===
Year	Player	Pos.	High School	College	NFL	Notes
1982	John Paye	QB	Menlo School	Stanford	Yes	Two year NFL career
1983	Ryan Knight	RB	Rubidoux	USC	No	
1984	Hart Lee Dykes	WR	Bay City	Oklahoma State	Yes	Two-year NFL career
1985	Jeff George	QB	Warren Central	Illinois	Yes	13-year NFL career
1986	Emmitt Smith	RB	Escambia	Florida	Yes	Pro Football Hall of Fame, 4x rushing champion
1987	Todd Marinovich	QB	Mission Viejo	USC	Yes	Two-year NFL career
1988	Terry Kirby	RB	Tabb	Virginia	Yes	Ten-year NFL career
1989	Andre Hastings	WR	Morrow	Georgia	Yes	Eight-year NFL career
1990	Marquette Smith	RB	Lake Howell	FSU / Central Florida	Yes	Two year NFL career
1991	Stephen Davis	RB	Spartanburg	Auburn	Yes	Three-time Pro Bowler
1992	Ron Powlus	QB	Berwick (PA)	Notre Dame	Yes	Played in one NFL season
1993	Josh Booty	QB	Evangel Christian	LSU	Yes	Three-year NFL career
1994	Dan Kendra	QB	Bethlehem Catholic	Florida State	No	
1995	Tim Couch	QB	Leslie County	Kentucky	Yes	First overall pick in NFL draft
1996	Travis Minor	RB	Baton Rouge Catholic	Florida State	Yes	Eight-year NFL career
1997	Ronald Curry	QB	Hampton High	North Carolina	Yes	Seven-year NFL career
1998	Chris Simms	QB	Ramapo	Texas	Yes	Eight-year NFL career
1999	Brock Berlin	QB	Evangel Christian	Florida/Miami	Yes	Played in two NFL seasons
2000	Joe Mauer	QB	Cretin-Derham Hall	N/A	No	Went to Major League Baseball; 2009 American League MVP
2001	Maurice Clarett	RB	Warren Harding	Ohio State	No	Drafted, but never played in NFL
2002	Chris Leak	QB	Independence	Florida	Yes	Made NFL roster for one season, did not play
2003	Brian Brohm	QB	Trinity	Louisville	Yes	Three-season NFL career
2004	Ryan Perrilloux	QB	East St. John (La.)	LSU / Jacksonville State	No	Signed and released by NY Giants Played in Arena and in France Ligue Élite de Football Américain
2005	Mitch Mustain	QB	Springdale	Arkansas / USC	No	Played in Arena Football League
2006	Jimmy Clausen	QB	Oaks Christian (Calif.)	Notre Dame	Yes	Second-round pick in 2010 draft
2007	Terrelle Pryor	QB	Jeannette (Pa.) High School	Ohio State	Yes	2011 Supplemental draft
2008	Garrett Gilbert	QB	Lake Travis (Tex.) High School	Texas / SMU	Yes	Sixth round pick in 2014 NFL draft
2009	Seantrel Henderson	OT	Cretin-Derham Hall	Miami	Yes	7th round pick in 2014 NFL draft
2010	Kiehl Frazier	QB	Shiloh Christian	Auburn / Ouachita Baptist	No	
2011	Dorial Green-Beckham	WR	Hillcrest (Mo.) High	Missouri / Oklahoma	Yes	Second-round pick in 2015 NFL draft
2012	Max Browne	QB	Skyline High School	USC / Pittsburgh	No	
2013	Leonard Fournette	RB	St. Augustine High School (LA)	LSU	Yes	First-round pick in 2017 NFL draft
2014	Kyler Murray	QB	Allen (TX)	Texas A&M / Oklahoma	Yes	First overall pick of the 2019 NFL draft
2015	Jacob Eason	QB	Lake Stevens High School (WA)	Georgia / Washington	Yes	Fourth-round pick in 2020 NFL draft
2016	Tate Martell	QB	Bishop Gorman (NV)	Ohio State / Miami / UNLV	No	
2017	Trevor Lawrence	QB	Cartersville High School	Clemson	Yes	First overall pick of the 2021 NFL draft
2018	DJ Uiagalelei	QB	St. John Bosco	Clemson / Oregon State / Florida State	–	
2019	Bryce Young	QB	Mater Dei High School	Alabama	Yes	First overall pick of the 2023 NFL draft
2020	Cade Klubnik	QB	Westlake (TX)	Clemson	Yes	Fourth-round pick in 2026 NFL draft
2021	Cade Klubnik (2)	QB	Westlake (TX)	Clemson	Yes	
2022	Lamar Sperling	RB	Archbishop Hoban (OH)	Buffalo	–	
2023	DJ Lagway	QB	Willis (TX)	Florida	–	
2025	Keisean Henderson	QB	Legacy the School of Sport Sciences (TX)	Houston	–	

=== Defense ===
Year	Player	Pos.	High School	College	NFL	Notes
1982	Henry Harris	LB	Columbia (Ga.)	Georgia	No	
1983	Ron Stallworth	DT	Woodham (Fla.)	Auburn	Yes	Two-year NFL career
1984	Quintus McDonald	LB	Montclair (NJ)	Penn State	Yes	Three-year NFL career
1985	John Foley	LB	St. Rita (Ill.)	Notre Dame	No	
1986	Marc Spindler	DT	West Scranton	Pittsburgh	Yes	Nine-year NFL career
1987	Todd Collins	LB	Jefferson County (TN)	Carson-Newman	Yes	Nine-year NFL career, two Super Bowl appearances
1988	Sean Gilbert	LB	Aliquippa (Pa.)	Pittsburgh	Yes	Played 11 NFL seasons
1989	Oliver Gibson	LB	Romeoville (Ill.)	Notre Dame	Yes	Nine-year NFL career
1990	Derrick Brooks	LB	Booker T. Washington (Fla.)	Florida State	Yes	Nine-time NFL All-Pro
1991	Dexter Daniels	LB	Valdosta	Florida	Yes	Played four NFL games
1992	Jammi German	HB	Fort Myers (Fla.)	Miami (Fla.)	Yes	Four-year NFL career
1993	Lamont Green	LB	Southridge (Fla.)	Florida State	Yes	Played in the NFL in 1999
1994	Kory Minor	LB	Bishop Amat (Calif.)	Notre Dame	Yes	Four-year NFL career
1995	Andy Katzenmoyer	LB	Westerville South (Ohio)	Ohio State	Yes	Butkus and Lambert award winner in college
1996	David Warren	DE	John Tyler (Tex.)	Florida State	No	Played in the CFL
1997	Dennis Johnson	DE	Harrodsburg	Kentucky	Yes	Three-year NFL career
1998	Cory Redding	LB	North Shore (Tex.)	Texas	Yes	12-year NFL career
1999	D.J. Williams	LB	De La Salle (Calif.)	Miami	Yes	Ten-year NFL career
2000	Shaun Cody	DL	Los Altos (Calif.)	USC	Yes	Seven-year NFL career
2001	Ahmad Brooks	LB	C. D. Hylton (Va.)	Virginia	Yes	11-year NFL career
2002	Antonio Cromartie	DB	Lincoln (Fl.)	Florida State	Yes	11-year NFL career
2003	Ted Ginn Jr.	DB	Glenville (Ohio)	Ohio State	Yes	14-year NFL career
2004	Kenny Phillips	DB	Carol City (Fl.)	Miami	Yes	Eight-year NFL career
2005	Gerald McCoy	DL	Southeast (Okla.)	Oklahoma	Yes	11-year NFL career
2006	Marvin Austin	DT	Ballou (Wash., DC)	North Carolina	Yes	Five-year NFL career
2007	Patrick Peterson	DB	Blanche Ely (Fla.)	LSU	Yes	Active in NFL since 2011
2008	Manti Te'o	LB	Punahou (Hawai'i)	Notre Dame	Yes	Seven-year NFL career
2009	Lamarcus Joyner	DB	St. Thomas Aquinas (Fla.)	Florida State	Yes	Active in NFL since 2014
2010	Jadeveon Clowney	DE	South Pointe	South Carolina	Yes	First overall pick in 2014 NFL draft
2011	Mario Edwards Jr.	DE	Ryan High (Tex.)	Florida State	Yes	Second round pick in 2015 NFL draft
2012	Su'a Cravens	DB	Vista Murrieta (CA.)	USC	Yes	Second round pick in 2016 NFL draft
2013	Jabrill Peppers	DB	Paramus Catholic (NJ)	Michigan	Yes	First round pick in 2017 NFL draft
2014	Trenton Thompson	DT	Westover Comprehensive (GA)	Georgia	Yes	Undrafted, Signed by Cleveland Browns
2015	Rashan Gary	DT	Paramus Catholic (NJ)	Michigan	Yes	First round pick in 2019 NFL draft
2016	Shaun Wade	DB	Trinity Christian (FL)	Ohio State	Yes	Fifth round pick in 2021 NFL draft
2017	Solomon Tuliaupupu	LB	Mater Dei	USC	–	
2018	Kayvon Thibodeaux	DE	Oaks Christian School	Oregon	Yes	First round pick in 2022 NFL draft
2019	Justin Flowe	LB	Upland	Oregon / Arizona		
2020	Ga'Quincy McKinstry	CB	Pinson Valley	Alabama	Yes	Second round pick in 2024 NFL draft
2021	Walter Nolen	DT	Powell (TN)	Texas A&M / Ole Miss	Yes	First round pick in 2025 NFL draft
2022	Caleb Downs	DB	Mill Creek (GA)	Alabama / Ohio State	Yes	First round pick in 2026 NFL draft
2023	Sammy Brown	LB	Jefferson (GA)	Clemson	–	
2025	Cincere Johnson	LB	Glenville (OH)	Ohio State		

== See also ==
- USA Today All-USA high school football team
