= Travis Johnson (defensive end) =

American football player (born 1982)

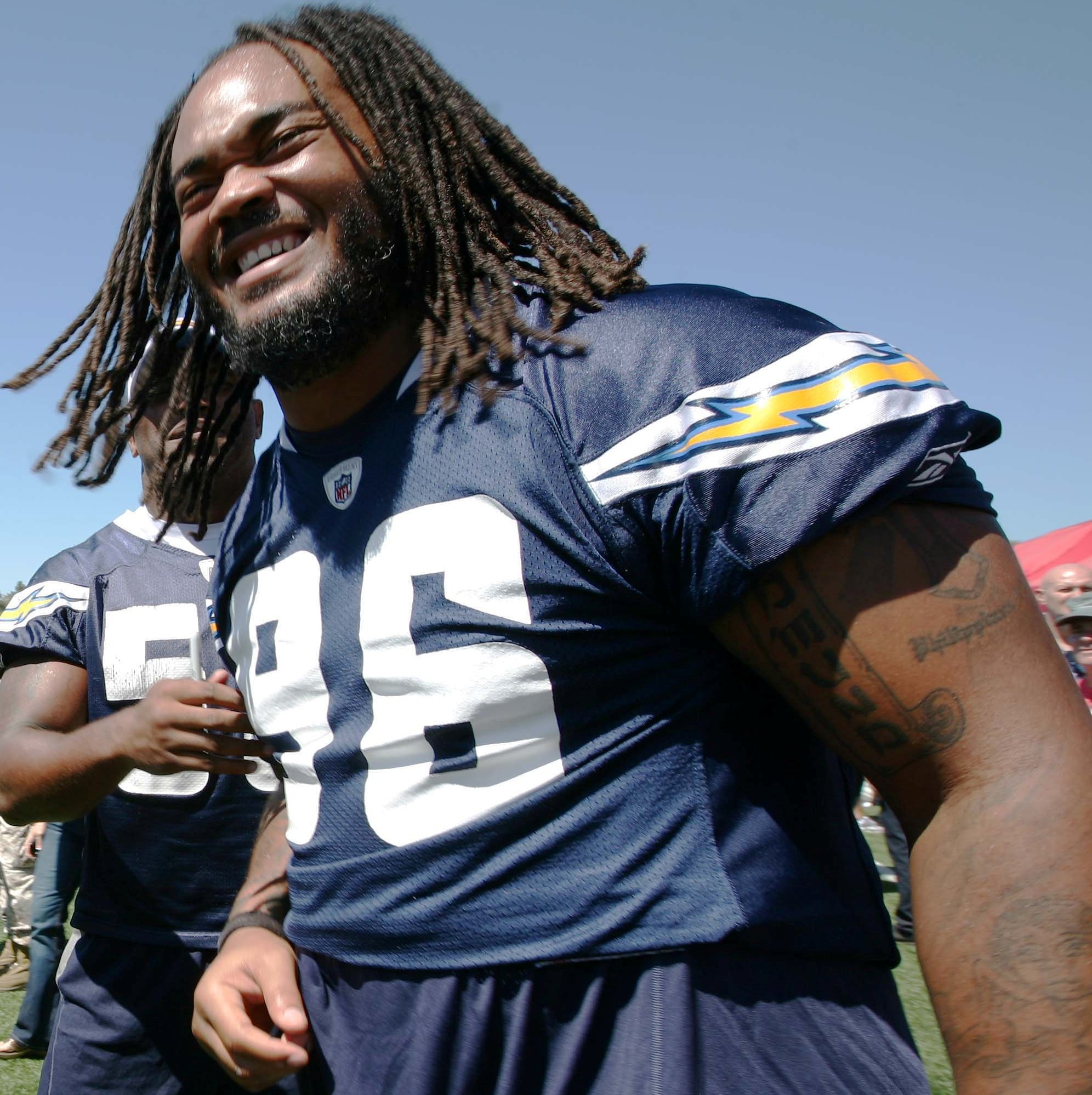
- Johnson with the San Diego Chargers in 2010

No. 75, 99, 96
- Position: Defensive end

Personal information
- Born: April 26, 1982 (age 44); Los Angeles, California, U.S.
- Listed height: 6 ft 3 in (1.91 m)
- Listed weight: 311 lb (141 kg)

Career information
- High school: Notre Dame (Sherman Oaks, California)
- College: Florida State (2000–2004)
- NFL draft: 2005: 1st round, 16th overall pick

Career history
- Houston Texans (2005–2008); San Diego Chargers (2009–2010)

Awards and highlights
- Third-team All-American (2004); First-team All-ACC (2004)

Career NFL statistics
- Total tackles: 141
- Sacks: 3
- Pass deflections: 9
- Interceptions: 1
- Stats at Pro Football Reference

Travis Andre Johnson (born April 26, 1982) is an American former professional football player who was a defensive end in the National Football League (NFL). He was selected by the Houston Texans in the first round of the 2005 NFL draft. He played college football for the Florida State Seminoles.

He also played for the San Diego Chargers.

== Early life ==
Johnson was born Los Angeles, and raised in Oak Park/Agoura (which he moved to when he was in fifth grade), a suburban town about 30 miles north of Los Angeles. Johnson attended Oak Park High School his freshman year before transferring to Notre Dame High School in Sherman Oaks, California. He earned Parade, PrepStar, Football News and USA Today All-America first-team honors as a senior. Johnson recorded 104 tackles, including 32 for loss, and 17 sacks as a senior for the Knights while also setting school records for career sacks (61), tackles for loss (77), forced fumbles (14), and blocked punts (five).

Before attending Notre Dame High School, Johnson played for his hometown of Oak Park, California for one year, playing junior varsity football and varsity basketball.

== College career ==
He also played forward on the basketball team, and in track and field he competed in the shot put and the 100 meter dash. Johnson, a highly touted recruit coming out of high school, chose to attend Florida State University. He started all 12 games at left defensive tackle during his senior year and was an All-ACC first-team choice after recording 50 tackles with 2.5 sacks, 18 tackles for loss, and 12 quarterback pressures. As well as an AP All-American (third team).

== Professional career ==
Pre-draft measurables
Height	Weight	40-yard dash	20-yard shuttle	Three-cone drill	Vertical jump	Broad jump	Bench press
6 ft 3 5/8 in (1.92 m)	298 lb (135 kg)	4.91 s	4.42 s	7.48 s	34.0 in (0.86 m)	8 ft 7 in (2.62 m)	23 reps
All values from NFL Combine/Pro Day

Projected as a mid-first rounder by Sports Illustrated, Johnson was ranked as the best defensive tackle available in the 2005 NFL draft. Johnson was selected by the Houston Texans in the first round (16th overall). Johnson saw limited playing time due to injuries.

Johnson was traded to the San Diego Chargers on August 31, 2009, for a sixth round pick in the 2010 NFL draft.

=== NFL statistics ===
Years	Team	GP	COMB	TOTAL	AST	SACK	FF	FR	FR YDS	INT	IR YDS	AVG IR	LNG IR	TD	PD
2005	HOU	15	26	23	3	1.0	0	0	0	0	0	0	0	0	0
2006	HOU	9	11	8	3	0.0	0	0	0	0	0	0	0	0	1
2007	HOU	15	41	27	14	0.0	0	0	0	1	0	0	0	0	5
2008	HOU	15	28	22	6	1.0	1	0	0	0	0	0	0	0	2
2009	SD	13	16	13	3	0.0	0	0	0	0	0	0	0	0	1
2010	SD	9	14	10	4	1.0	0	0	0	0	0	0	0	0	0
Career		76	136	103	33	3.0	1	0	0	1	0	0	0	0	9
