= Anthony Pleasant =

American football player and coach (born 1968)

No. 98, 96, 94
- Positions: Defensive end, defensive tackle

Personal information
- Born: January 27, 1968 (age 58); Century, Florida, U.S.
- Listed height: 6 ft 5 in (1.96 m)
- Listed weight: 280 lb (127 kg)

Career information
- High school: Century
- College: Tennessee State
- NFL draft: 1990: 3rd round, 73rd overall pick

Career history
- Cleveland Browns (1990–1995); Baltimore Ravens (1996); Atlanta Falcons (1997); New York Jets (1998–1999); San Francisco 49ers (2000); New England Patriots (2001–2003)

Awards and highlights
- 2× Super Bowl champion (XXXVI, XXXVIII); NFL forced fumbles co-leader (1995)

Career NFL statistics
- Tackles: 534
- Sacks: 58
- Interceptions: 2
- Stats at Pro Football Reference

Anthony Devon Pleasant (born January 27, 1968) is an American former professional football player and assistant coach. A 6'5", 280-lb. defensive end from Century, Florida and Tennessee State University, Pleasant was selected by the Cleveland Browns in the third round of the 1990 NFL draft with the 73rd overall pick. He played in 14 NFL seasons from 1990 to 2004 for the Browns, Baltimore Ravens, Atlanta Falcons, New York Jets, San Francisco 49ers, and New England Patriots. In his career, Pleasant appeared in 202 games and recorded 58.0 sacks with 2 interceptions.

Pleasant spent the last three years of his career with the Patriots and won two Super Bowls with the team (XXXVI and XXXVIII). He retired following the latter.

After his playing career, Pleasant served as the assistant defensive coach for the NFL's Kansas City Chiefs and Houston Texans.

== Coaching career ==
Assistant defensive coach for the Kansas City Chiefs from 2010 to 2012. Kansas City Chiefs.

Assistant strength and conditioning coach in 2014 for the Houston Texans. Assistant defensive coach in 2015 for the Houston Texans.

Sporting positions
Preceded by Tim Krumrie	Kansas City Chiefs Defensive Lines Coach; 2010-2013	Succeeded by Incumbent
Preceded by N/A	Houston Texans Defensive Assistant Coach; 2014-present	Succeeded by incumbent
