= USA Today High School Player of the Year =

USA Today High School Player of the Year may refer to:

- USA Today High School Basketball Player of the Year
- USA Today High School Football Player of the Year, to the best offensive and defensive high school football players in America
