= Ronald Stallworth =

Ronald Stallworth could refer to:

- Ron Stallworth (born 1953), American police officer
- Ron Stallworth (American football) (born 1966), American football player
