= Escambia County School District =

School district in Escambia County, Florida

Escambia County Public Schools
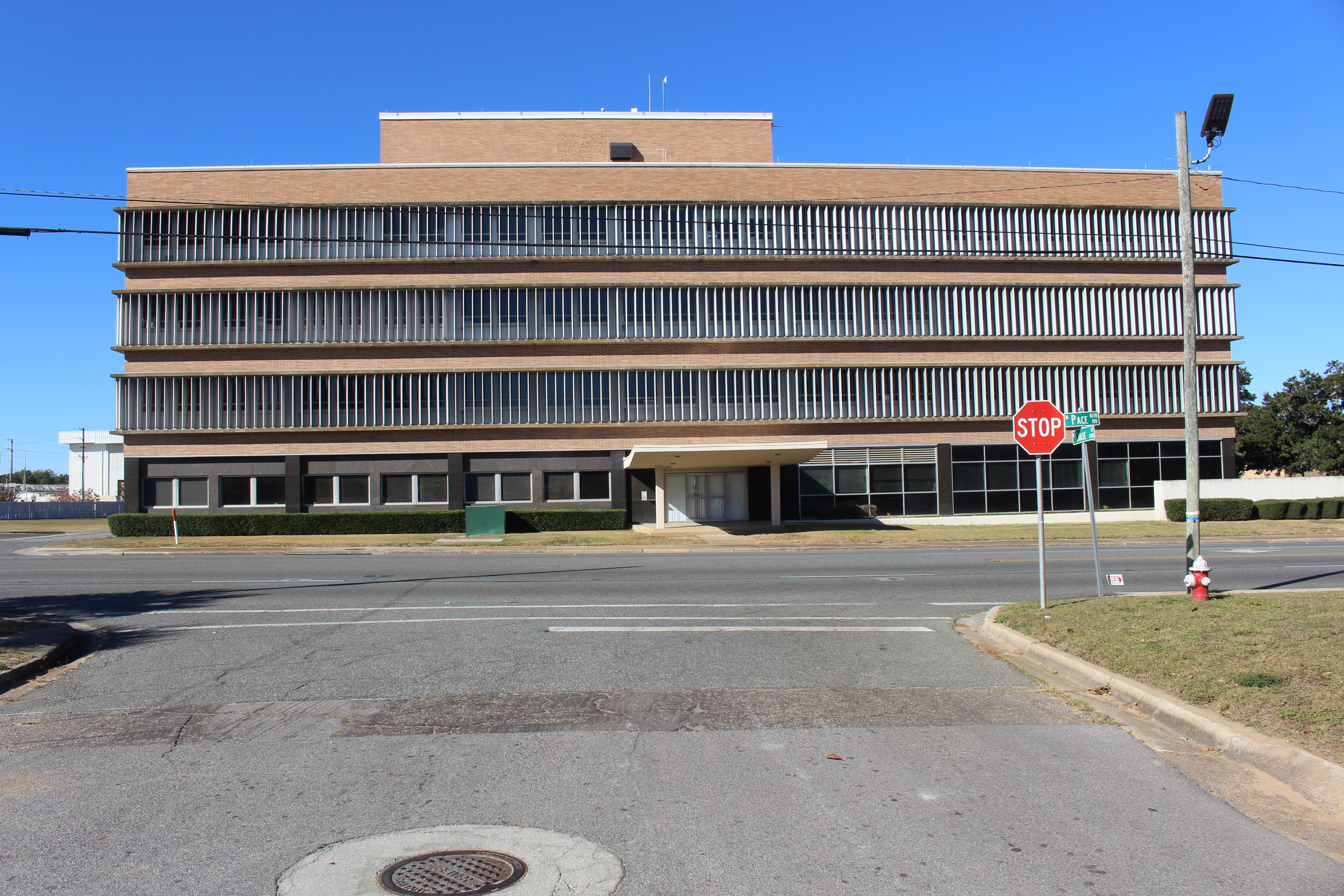

Location
- Pensacola United States

District information
- Type: Public
- Motto: "Making a positive Difference"
- Grades: K-12
- Superintendent: Keith Leonard (interim)
- Schools: 51
- Budget: $617,784,087.64

Students and staff
- Students: 40,496
- Teachers: 5372

Other information
- Schedule: Elementary 7:00 AM-2:15 PM CST; Middle 9:20 AM-4:15 PM; High School 8:30 AM-3:10 PM
- Website: www.escambiaschools.org

Escambia County Public Schools (ECPS), officially the Escambia County School District (ECSD), is the organization responsible for the administration of public schools in all of Escambia County, Florida, in the United States. The district currently administers 35 elementary schools, nine middle schools, and seven high schools, as well as a number of specialized centers.

The district is administered by an appointed superintendent and a five-member school board. As of the 2023-2024 school year, the superintendent of schools is Keith Leonard, who serves as the interim superintendent following the dismissal of Timothy Smith in May 2023.

The Escambia County electors voted in November 2018, to switch from an elected superintendent to an appointed superintendent. Prior to 2020, the superintendent was elected in presidential election years. The deputy superintendent of schools is Shenna Payne, a former principal of West Florida High School.

== Book banning ==
On May 17, 2023, the Escambia County School District was sued for allegedly engaging in discriminatory book bans in public school libraries. The lawsuit was filed by Escambia County parents, the PEN America nonprofit, and Penguin Random House. The plaintiffs allege that the School District is engaged in an "ideologically driven campaign to push certain ideas out of schools." The suit refers to Island Trees School District v. Pico, which says that School Districts cannot decide what content to provide based on narrowly partisan or political grounds. The suit alleges that the School District's logic could be used to ban books on Christianity, America's Founding Fathers, and American war heroes. The case is currently pending before the Florida Northern District Court.

Supporters argue that the book bans help remove inappropriate content. However, researchers determined that less than 3% of the books banned across the United States in 2022 were mature (17+) rated. In addition, Vicki Baggett, a Northview High School language-arts teacher, asked for over 100 books to be challenged due to their "political pushes."

Books that have been banned include Toni Morrison's The Bluest Eye, Khaled Hosseini's The Kite Runner, and Sapphire's Push. The School District has also announced that it has removed from its shelves five dictionaries (including the Merriam-Webster Elementary Dictionary, Webster's Dictionary and Thesaurus for Students, and The American Heritage Children's Dictionary), eight encyclopedias (including The Bible Book and The World Book Encyclopedia of People and Places) and The Guinness Book of World Records.

== Governance ==
The members of the school board are:

- District 1 - Kevin Adams
- District 2 - Paul H. Fetsko
- District 3 - David Williams
- District 4 - Carissa Bergosh
- District 5 - Tom Harrell

Members are elected in their respective districts for a four-year term. Representatives from districts 1, 2, and 3 are elected in non-presidential election years. Representatives for districts 4 and 5 are elected in presidential election years. Although elected by districts, each member is charged by statute with representing the entire school district.

Because the school board elections are non-partisan, these races are frequently decided in the primary election. Candidates that receive a majority of the vote in the primary win the election. If no candidate receives a majority of the primary vote, the top two are in a run-off on the November ballot. In the 2024 election, an amendment to the Florida Constitution was enacted changing school board elections to partisan.

The school board appointed Tim Smith as superintendent. Smith was sworn in on November 17, 2020, replacing Malcolm Thomas, whose term ended. In May 2023, the school board voted (3 to 2) to terminate Smith's contract. The decision was highly controversial. Assistant Superintendent of Human Resources, Keith Leonard, was selected to serve as the interim superintendent for the 2023-2024 school year.

Prior to 2018 voters directly elected the superintendent; voters chose to make the superintendent chosen by the school board that year. In 2023 the school board rejected a proposal to make the superintendent an elected position again.

== Schools ==
=== Adult centers ===
- Dixon Educational Center
- George Stone Technical Center

=== High schools ===
- Escambia High School (Gator)
- Northview High School (Chief)
- Pensacola High School (Tiger)
- Pine Forest High School (Eagle)
- J. M. Tate High School (Aggie)
- Booker T. Washington High School (Wildcat)
- West Florida High School of Advanced Technology (Jaguar)

=== Middle schools ===
- Bellview Middle School
- Beulah Academy of Science (Charter)
- Beulah Middle School
- Brown-Barge Middle School
- Ernest Ward Middle School
- Ferry Pass Middle School
- Jim C. Bailey Middle School
- Ransom Middle School
- Workman Middle School

==== Closed ====
- Woodham Middle School, formerly Woodham High School, was converted to a middle school following the 2006–07 school year. Closed the summer after the 2017-18 school year and began renovations to be converted into the new West Florida High School of Advanced Technology campus.
- Wedgewood Middle School
- Brentwood Middle School
- Brownsville Middle School

===== 2007 changes =====
Effective for the 2007–08 school year, Wedgewood Middle School and Brentwood Middle School students were transferred to Woodham High School, now Woodham Middle School. Brownsville Middle School students were transferred to Warrington Middle School, Brown Barge Middle School students were transferred into the Brentwood Middle School building, and Brownsville, Brentwood, and Wedgewood schools were closed.

===== 2018 changes =====
Effective for the 2018-19 school year, Woodham Middle School students were transferred to Ferry Pass Middle School, Workman Middle School, Warrington Middle School, and Beulah Middle School. This was in preparation for Woodham's former campus to be refitted into a new campus for West Florida High School of Advanced Technology.

=== Elementary schools ===
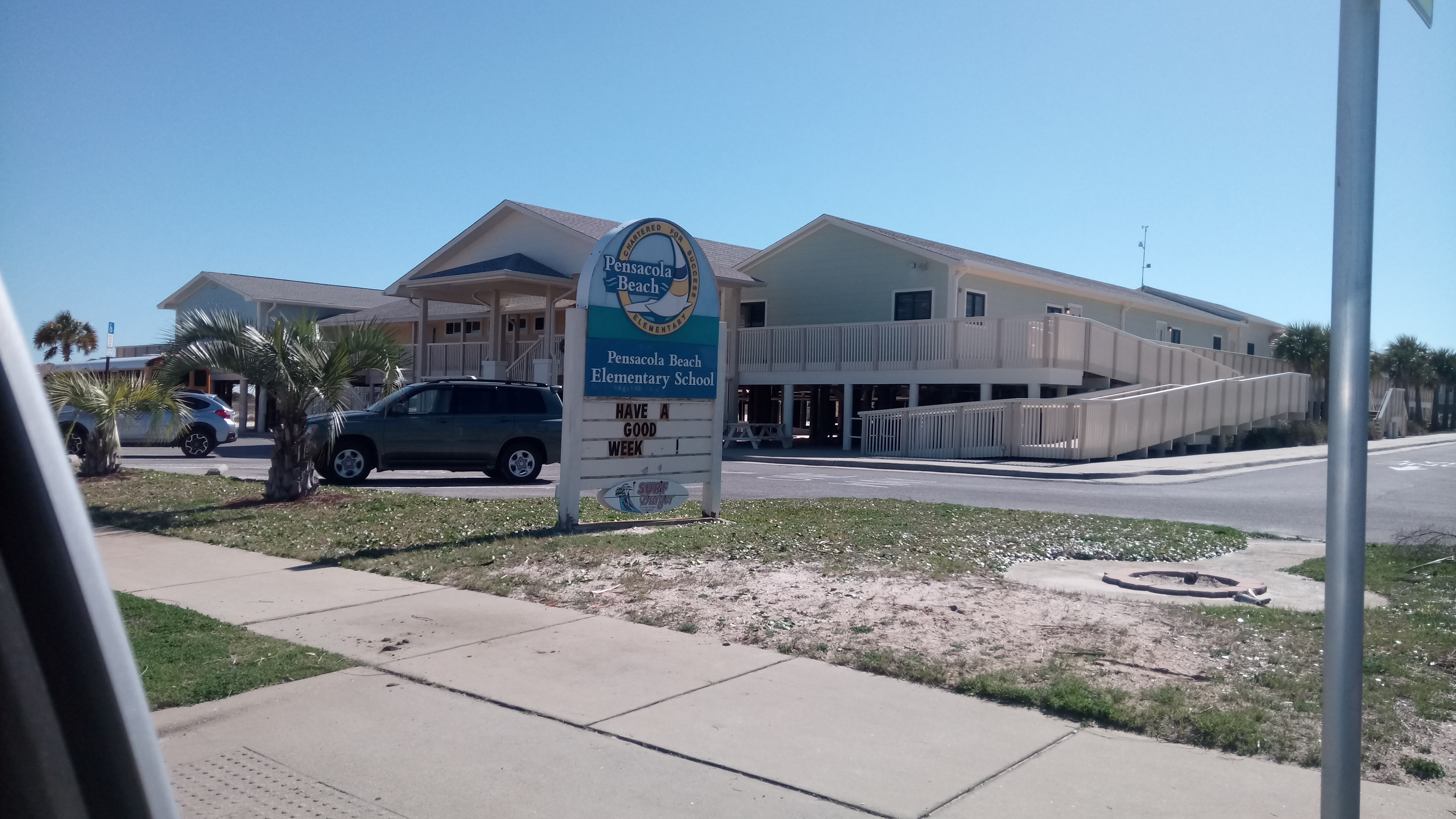
Pensacola Beach Elementary School was previously controlled by the district before becoming a charter school

- A.K. Suter Elementary School
- Bellview Elementary School
- Beulah Elementary School
- Blue Angels Elementary School
- Bratt Elementary School
- Brentwood Elementary School
- C.A. Weis Elementary Community School
- Cordova Park Elementary School
- Ensley Elementary School
- Ferry Pass Elementary School
- Global Learning Academy
- Hellen Caro Elementary School
- Holm Elementary School
- Jim Allen Elementary School
- Kingsfield Elementary School (opened August 2018)
- Lincoln Park Elementary School
- Longleaf Elementary School
- McArthur Elementary School
- Molino Park Elementary School
- Montclair Elementary School
- Myrtle Grove Elementary School
- N.B. Cook Elementary School
- Navy Point Elementary School
- O.J. Semmes Elementary School
- Oakcrest Elementary School
- Pine Meadow Elementary School
- Pleasant Grove Elementary School
- R.C. Lipscomb Elementary School
- Scenic Heights Elementary SChool
- Sherwood Elementary School
- Warrington Elementary School
- West Pensacola Elementary School

Pensacola Beach Elementary School, which became a charter school in 2001, is a part of the ECSD.

== Alternative schools ==
- Escambia Virtual Academy (Virtual School)

== Failing schools ==
The Florida Comprehensive Assessment Test (FCAT) determines which schools in the state of Florida should be considered "Failing." The Florida Standards Assessments (FSA) began phasing out the FCAT in the 2010–11 academic year in response to the inauguration of the Common Core State Standards Initiative under the administration of US president Barack Obama in 2010.

FCAT and FSA scores are calculated per subject on a 0 to 100 scale, and ratings in the 0 to 20 or 20 to 40 range are rated "F" or "D" respectively, indicating severe performance shortcomings and contributing to a 2 and 3-year process respectively of "restarting" the school.

In the 2017–18 school year, Escambia County placed as 52nd of 64 counties in the state by FSA performance, with eleven of thirty-five elementary schools receiving a D rating and three of ten middle schools receiving a D rating. No high school performed at a rating of D or below, though Escambia High School and Ferry Pass Middle School both recorded an "I," or incomplete rating for the 2017-18 school year.

Elementary School	Grades	2017-18 School Year Rating
Brentwood Elementary School	PreK-5	D
C.A. Weis Elementary School	PreK-5	D
Ensley Elementary School	PreK-5	D
Global Learning Academy	PreK-5	D
Longleaf Elementary School	PreK-5	D
Navy Point Elementary School	PreK-5	D
Oakcrest Elementary School	PreK-5	D
Reinhardt Holm Elementary School	PreK-5	D
Sherwood Elementary School	PreK-5	D
Warrington Elementary School	PreK-5	D
West Pensacola Elementary School	PreK-5	D

Middle School	Grades	2017-18 School Year Rating
Bellview Middle School	6-8	D
Warrington Middle School	6-8	D
Woodham Middle School	6-8	D
Ferry Pass Middle School	6-8	I

High School	Grades	2017-18 School Year Rating
Escambia High School	9-12	I
