= Vitanza =

Vitanza is a surname. Notable people with the surname include:

- Catiana Vitanza (born 1990), American soccer player
- Joe Vitanza (born 1963), Australian rugby league footballer
- Victor Vitanza, American academic
