= Zachary Thornton =

Zachary Thornton may refer to:

- Zack Thornton, American baseball player and coach
- Zac Thornton, American baseball player

== See also ==
- Zach Thornton, American soccer player and coach
