= Erik Affholter =

American football player (born 1966)

No. 82
- Position: Wide receiver

Personal information
- Born: April 10, 1966 (age 60); Detroit, Michigan, U.S.
- Listed height: 6 ft 0 in (1.83 m)
- Listed weight: 187 lb (85 kg)

Career information
- High school: Oak Park (Oak Park, California)
- College: USC
- NFL draft: 1989: 4th round, 110th overall pick

Career history
- Green Bay Packers (1989); Washington Redskins (1990); Green Bay Packers (1991); San Diego Chargers (1992)*
- * Offseason or practice squad member only

Awards and highlights
- First-team All-American (1988); First-team All-Pac-10 (1988)

Career NFL statistics
- Receptions: 7
- Receiving yards: 68
- Stats at Pro Football Reference

Erik Konrad Affholter (born April 10, 1966) is an American former professional football player who was a wide receiver for the Green Bay Packers of the National Football League (NFL). As a 16-year-old place kicker during his junior season of high school he broke a national record with a 64-yard field goal, which at the time was the longest field goal kicked at any level. Playing college football for the USC Trojans, he was an All-American and established school records for most receptions in a season, and in a career. In 2020, he wrote a book named "America's Miracle".

== Early and personal life ==
He was born in Detroit, Michigan, to Conrad (a salesman) and Ruth Affholter, and is Jewish. In the early 1970s, the family moved to Agoura, California. He later lived in Anthem, Arizona.

== High school ==
Affholter played football at Oak Park High School in Ventura County, California. As a 16-year-old place kicker during his junior season he broke a national record with a 64-yard (59 meter) field goal in 1982, which at the time was the longest field goal kicked at any level. A sportswriter at the game estimated it could have gone 74 yards (68 meters). Asked about his kick, Affholter said: "I'd much rather catch touchdown passes." At the time, as a wide receiver he had caught more touchdown passes than any player in his high school conference.

In addition to kicking field goals and extra points, he played tailback, wide receiver, defensive back, and linebacker. In 1983 he was a USA Today All-USA high school football first-team All-American, All-California Interscholastic Federation (CIF), and All-State; he was also a Los Angeles Times running back of the year.

== College ==
Affholter played college football at the University of Southern California (USC) for the Trojans as a wide receiver, though he had initially received a scholarship as a kicker. He was athletic, with a 36-inch (910 mm) vertical jump.

On November 21, 1987, he made a controversial memorable fourth quarter winning end zone juggling touchdown catch for a 17–13 upset over Troy Aikman's No. 5-ranked UCLA Bruins that sent the unranked 1987 USC Trojans football team to the 1988 Rose Bowl. He was named a member of the 1988 College Football All-America Team, and a Pac-10 All-Academic selection. In 1988 as a senior he led USC with 68 catches for 952 yards and eight touchdowns. He established USC records for most receptions in a season, and in a career (123). Upon graduation, he became a member of the USC Skull and Dagger Society.

== National Football League ==
He was drafted in the fourth round of the 1989 NFL draft by the Washington Redskins. On April 23, 1989, the Redskins then immediately traded him and two draft picks to the Green Bay Packers for quarterback Jeff Graham. About a month later he broke his ankle in a pick-up basketball game in New York City, shortly before reporting to Packers training camp. He spent the entire season on injured reserve. He played the 1991 season in the NFL for the Packers.

In 1992, he signed with the San Diego Chargers as a free agent. He retired in 1995 due to a career-ending knee injury.

== Coaching ==
Since retiring, he has coached high school and youth football.

== Honors ==
In 2016 he was inducted into the Southern California Jewish Sports Hall of Fame.

== See also ==
- List of select Jewish football players
