= Oak Park High School (California) =

Coordinates: 34.180131°N 118.765619°W

Location
- 899 North Kanan Road; Oak Park, CA; United States

Information
- Type: Public Secondary
- Established: 1978; 48 years ago
- School district: Oak Park Unified
- Principal: Mat McClenahan
- Teaching staff: 61.27 (FTE)
- Grades: 9–12
- Enrollment: 1,483 (2024-2025)
- Student to teacher ratio: 24.20
- Student Union/Association: None
- Colors: Black; Gold; White
- Athletics conference: CIF Southern Section; Coastal Canyon League
- Nickname: Eagles
- Rival: Agoura High School
- Accreditation: WASC
- National ranking: 51
- Newspaper: Oak Park Talon
- Affiliation: Western Association of Schools and Colleges (WASC)
- Website: www.oakparkusd.org/ophs/site/default.asp

Oak Park High School (abbreviated OPHS) is the main high school in the Oak Park Unified School District of Ventura County, California. The school enrolls ninth- through twelfth-grade students. It is a National Blue Ribbon School and a 2019 California Distinguished School, and received an Exemplary Distinction Award from the California of Education for its Career and Technical Education program which includes career pathways in Engineering Design, Media Arts, Production Management, and construction technologies. The 2012 Academic Performance Index (API) was 929, which is among the highest in California. In 2015, the school was awarded the California Gold Ribbon School Award from the California Department of Education. The 2016 Newsweek Ranking of America's Top Schools ranked Oak Park High as #51 in the nation and #7 in CA.

== History ==
As the construction of subdivisions proceeded in Oak Park during the 1970s and the population increased, schooling arrangements became increasingly frustrating for residents. Students had to be bused to high schools in Simi Valley, 23 miles away by road, and back again each day, despite the fact that schools of the nearby Las Virgenes Unified School District stood in proximity. With Oak Park lying in Ventura County and Las Virgenes in Los Angeles County, though, Oak Park students were not allowed to attend.

Seeking to deal with the problem, Oak Park residents petitioned for annexation to Las Virgenes but were rejected in 1974. In 1977, they created the Oak Park Unified School District and broke ground for the high school in 1978. Students were housed in trailers from 1979 to 1980 until the school began admitting students at its present site in 1981. It functioned as both middle and high school until 1992, when nearby Medea Creek Middle School began educating sixth- through eighth-grade students.

Campus expansion continued with the addition of a library, a performing arts center, an updated gym including a new floor, a new rubberized track, a turf football field, a stadium sound system, science labs, a student services building, modernized art classrooms, and computer labs. Additional work, to comply with the Americans with Disabilities Act, improved access to the baseball and softball fields. Five drinking fountains were installed in 2013.

== Academics ==
In 2016, Oak Park's AP program placed it at 51st in Newsweek's Top High Schools.

== School facilities ==
Oak Park High School added a two-story bungalow-style set of classrooms in 2005. The school has a pavilion building that houses a large theater stage, several classrooms, high-ceiling band, choir rooms with acoustic paneling, and a solar array as shade structures in the school's lunch and parking areas. OPHS received the California Distinguished School Award in 2019 with special distinction for its Exemplary Career and Technical Arts pathways. School modernization was completed in 2015, and the projects completed include modernized classrooms including science labs, student services building, gym, turf field, and Arts and Technology building (summer of 2013). Over 95% of classrooms are equipped with SmartBoards. In the 2019–2020 school year, OPHS implemented a one-to-one Chromebook program school-wide with ubiquitous Wi-Fi and unlimited student access to Google Apps for Education.

== Sports ==
Oak Park High School competes in the Coastal Canyon League, for all sports available at Oak Park High School.

Erik Affholter played football at Oak Park High School. As a 16-year-old place kicker during his junior season he broke a national record with a 64-yard (59 meter) field goal in 1982, which at the time was the longest field goal kicked at any level. A sportswriter at the game estimated it could have gone 74 yards (68 meters). Asked about his kick, Affholter said: "I'd much rather catch touchdown passes." At the time, as a wide receiver he had caught more touchdown passes than any player in his high school conference.

Oak Park offers sports such as football, basketball, girls' and boys' golf, girls' and boys' soccer, and tennis.

== Buildings ==
Oak Park High School has multiple building groups, each with multiple classrooms. The i-buildings, which are adjacent to The Great Lawn, are made from recycled shipping containers. The i-buildings are mainly used for math classes.

== Notable alumni ==
- Erik Affholter (born 1966), American football NFL wide receiver
- Zach Callison, actor and singer
- Brooke Candy, rapper
- Casey Crescenzo, singer, songwriter, and multi-instrumentalist
- Britt Marie Hermes (née Deegan), blogger
- Travis Johnson, football player
- Danielle Kang, golfer
- Kareem Maddox, basketball player
- Alexa Micek, volleyball player
- Zack Thornton, baseball pitcher and coach
- Catiana Vitanza, soccer player
- Curran Walters, actor and model
- Zachary Gordon (born 1998), actor
- Zendaya, actor and model

The following graduated from Oak Park Independent School:

- Malachi Barton
- Landry Bender
- Karan Brar
- Cameron Boyce
- Sabrina Carpenter
- Gabby Douglas
- Griffin Gluck
- Xochitl Gomez
- Zachary Gordon
- Ariana Greenblatt
- Olivia Holt
- Ricardo Hurtado
- Emma Kenney
- Peyton List
- Spencer List
- Kayla Maisonet
- China Anne McClain
- Luke Mullen
- Jace Norman
- Austin North
- Bradley Steven Perry
- Sophie Reynolds
- Rico Rodriguez
- Olivia Rodrigo
- Joshua Rush
- Merrell Twins
- Zendaya

== Notable teachers ==
- Allan Hunt
- Rick Rhodes
- Deanne Bray
