= David Lee (American football coach) =

American football player and coach (born 1953)

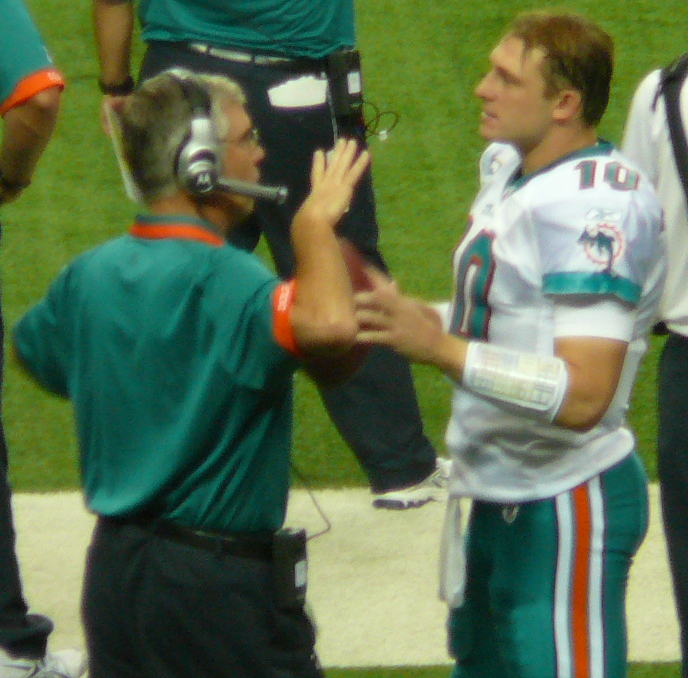
- Lee (left) with quarterback Chad Pennington in 2009

Profile
- Position: Quarterback

Personal information
- Born: July 2, 1953 (age 73); Dexter, Missouri, U.S.

Career information
- High school: Woodham (Pensacola, Florida)
- College: Vanderbilt

Career history
- Tennessee–Martin (1975–1976) Quarterbacks coach & wide receivers coach; Vanderbilt (1977) Quarterbacks coach; Ole Miss (1978–1982) Quarterbacks coach; New Mexico (1983) Offensive coordinator; Arkansas (1984–1987) Quarterbacks coach & fullbacks coach; Arkansas (1988) Offensive coordinator; UTEP (1989–1993) Head coach; Rice (1994–2000) Offensive coordinator & quarterbacks coach; Arkansas (2001–2002) Quarterbacks coach; Dallas Cowboys (2003–2004) Offensive quality control coach; Dallas Cowboys (2005–2006) Quarterbacks coach; Arkansas (2007) Offensive coordinator; Miami Dolphins (2008–2010) Quarterbacks coach; Ole Miss (2011) Offensive coordinator; Buffalo Bills (2012) Quarterbacks coach; New York Jets (2013–2014) Quarterbacks coach; Buffalo Bills (2015–2016) Quarterbacks coach; Cleveland Browns (2017) Quarterbacks coach; Memphis Express (2019) Quarterbacks coach

Head coaching record
- Regular season: NCAA: 11–41–1 (.217)

David Lee (born July 2, 1953) is an American football coach and former player. Lee has spent many years as a quarterbacks coach, and has served as the head coach of the UTEP Miners.

== College ==
Lee attended Vanderbilt University from 1971 to 1975 where he earned a bachelor's degree in history in 1975. As the quarterback for the Vanderbilt Commodores football team, he served as team captain and was named the team's most valuable player in 1974. Lee went on to lead his team to a record of record of 7–3–2 including a 6–6 tie against the Texas Tech Red Raiders in the Peach Bowl.

== Coaching career ==
=== College ===
Lee began his coaching career at the University of Tennessee at Martin as the quarterbacks and receivers coach. During his time at the University of Tennessee at Martin, he organized the first Fellowship of Christian Athletes chapter in the school's history.

He then left Tennessee-Martin to return to his alma mater, Vanderbilt University, where he coached as the quarterbacks coach for one season. He then spent the next five season as a quarterbacks coach (1978–1982) with the University of Mississippi. In 1983, he served as the offensive coordinator and quarterbacks coach at the University of New Mexico. Lee left the University of New Mexico to join the University of Arkansas coaching staff. He coached at the University of Arkansas for four years under Ken Hatfield. During his four years as the Razorbacks quarterbacks coach, Lee helped direct the Razorback teams with a record of 45–15–1 as well as five consecutive bowl appearances and was also promoted to offensive coordinator at the University of Arkansas in 1988 where he help lead the Razorbacks to a Southwest Conference title. In 1989, he accepted his first head coaching job with the University of Texas at El Paso (UTEP) from 1989 to 1993 and posted a record of 11–41–1. In 1994, Lee joined the Hatfield's coaching staff at Rice University as offensive coordinator and quarterbacks coach where he helped lead Rice to a share of the Southwest Conference title. Lee returned to Arkansas in 2001 and helped the Razorbacks to a Southeastern Conference Western Division title.

=== Professional ===
Lee accepted a professional football coaching position with the Dallas Cowboys in 2003. As an offensive assistant and offensive quality control coach in his first year with the Cowboys, he helped the Cowboys offense finish 15th overall which was a moderate improvement from the 2002 season. In his third year, his role with the Cowboys increased as he became the quarterbacks coach.

=== Return to coaching college ===
Following his fourth year with the Cowboys as offensive quality control, Lee returned to the University of Arkansas as offensive coordinator and quarterbacks coach in 2007. Lee followed Houston Nutt to Ole Miss to be their offensive coordinator, however, his old boss, Bill Parcells—the Miami Dolphins new VP of Football Operations—hired Lee to be the Dolphins quarterback coach for the 2008 season. Lee was named “Innovator of the Year” 2008 by Sporting News for introducing the “Wildcat offense” to the NFL.

After finishing a two-year stint at Miami, on Monday January 11, 2011 Lee was brought back to the University of Mississippi as offensive coordinator under head coach Houston Nutt.

=== Buffalo Bills ===
Following the departure of George Cortez who took a job as the head coach of the Hamilton TigerCats of the CFL, The Buffalo Bills hired Lee on January 13, 2012 to be the Quarterback coach under Chan Gailey. He, along with the entire Bills coaching staff, was dismissed on December 31, 2012.

=== New York Jets ===
On January 20, 2013, Lee was hired as the QB Coach for the New York Jets.

=== Buffalo Bills ===
On January 19, 2015, Lee was hired as the QB Coach for the Buffalo Bills. He left this job on February 8, 2017, when he was hired as QB coach of the Cleveland Browns.

=== Cleveland Browns ===
On February 8, 2017, Lee was named QB coach for the Cleveland Browns by Browns coach Hue Jackson. On January 12, 2018, it was announced that Lee was fired as the Browns' QB coach.

=== Memphis Express ===
On October 9, 2018, Lee was named QB coach for the Memphis Express of the Alliance of American Football.

== Personal life ==
Lee spent most of his childhood in Dexter, Missouri. He then attended Woodham High School in Pensacola, Florida, where he graduated in 1971. Lee is currently married to Lynne Kazanowski. The couple have four children (daughters Dana and Shannon, and sons Brian and Jordan).

== Head coaching record ==
Year	Team	Overall	Conference	Standing	Bowl/playoffs
UTEP Miners (Western Athletic Conference) (1989–1993)
1989	UTEP	2–10	1–7	8th	
1990	UTEP	3–8	1–7	9th	
1991	UTEP	4–7–1	2–5–1	T–6th	
1992	UTEP	1–10	1–7	10th	
1993	UTEP	1–6 (Note: Charlie Bailey served as UTEP's head coach for the final five games of the season. UTEP finished the season at 1–11 overall and 0–8 in conference, placing tenth.)	0–3		
UTEP:		11–41–1	5–29–1		
Total:		11–41–1			

== See also ==
- List of Vanderbilt University people
