= Tyronne Green =

American football player (born 1986)

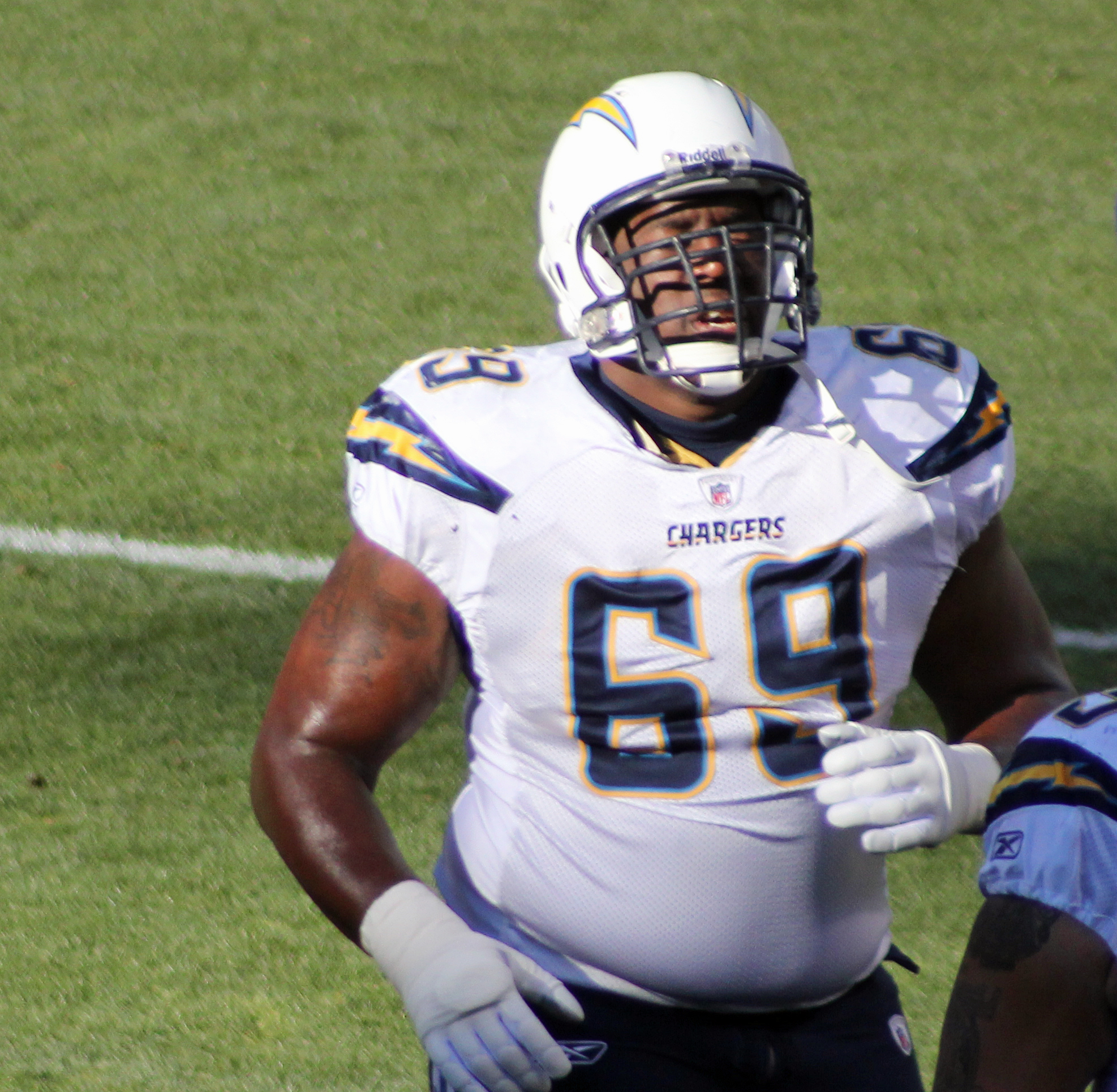
- Green with the San Diego Chargers in 2011

No. 69
- Position: Offensive guard

Personal information
- Born: April 6, 1986 (age 40); Pensacola, Florida, U.S.
- Listed height: 6 ft 2 in (1.88 m)
- Listed weight: 316 lb (143 kg)

Career information
- High school: Woodham (Pensacola)
- College: Auburn
- NFL draft: 2009: 4th round, 133rd overall pick

Career history
- San Diego Chargers (2009–2012); New England Patriots (2013); Dallas Cowboys (2014)*; Carolina Panthers (2015)
- * Offseason or practice squad member only

Career NFL statistics
- Games played: 41
- Games started: 28
- Stats at Pro Football Reference

Tyronne Darnell Green (born April 6, 1986) is an American former professional football player who was a guard in the National Football League (NFL). He played college football for the Auburn Tigers. He was selected by the San Diego Chargers in the fourth round of the 2009 NFL draft.

== Early life ==
Greene was born in Pensacola, Florida and attended Woodham High School, where he played both football and basketball.

== Professional career ==
Pre-draft measurables
Height	Weight	Arm length	Hand span	40-yard dash	10-yard split	20-yard split	20-yard shuttle	Three-cone drill	Vertical jump	Broad jump	Bench press
6 ft 1 3/4 in (1.87 m)	309 lb (140 kg)	33 3/4 in (0.86 m)	10 1/4 in (0.26 m)	5.43 s	1.80 s	3.10 s	4.80 s	8.12 s	28.5 in (0.72 m)	8 ft 6 in (2.59 m)	22 reps
All values from NFL Combine/Pro Day

=== San Diego Chargers ===
Green was selected by the San Diego Chargers with the 133rd overall pick in the 2009 NFL draft.

=== New England Patriots ===
Green signed with the New England Patriots on July 25, 2013.

=== Dallas Cowboys ===
Green was signed by the Dallas Cowboys on May 27, 2014. A month later the Cowboys placed him on injured reserve, but was later released with an injury settlement.

=== Carolina Panthers ===
Green was signed to a futures contract by the Carolina Panthers on December 31, 2014.

On February 7, 2016, Green's Panthers played in Super Bowl 50. In the game, the Panthers fell to the Denver Broncos by a score of 24–10.

== Personal life ==
Green is the first cousin of tight end Ladarius Green, who played for the Pittsburgh Steelers. The two played together for San Diego Chargers for one season in 2012.
