= Oak Park Unified School District =

School district in Ventura County, California

Coordinates: 34.20103°N 118.72983°W

Address
- 5801 Conifer Street Oak Park, California, 91377; United States

District information
- Type: Public
- Grades: K–12
- NCES District ID: 0627850

Students and staff
- Students: 4,355 (2020–2021)
- Teachers: 185.83 (FTE)
- Staff: 285.68 (FTE)
- Student–teacher ratio: 23.44:1

Other information
- Website: www.oakparkusd.org

Oak Park Unified School District (OPUSD) is a K-12 school district in southeast Ventura County, California. It consists of seven public schools in the community of Oak Park. Additionally, it covers small portions of the Bell Canyon census-designated place.

== History ==
When the community of Oak Park was created in the 1900s, it was within the Simi Valley Unified School District. However, there was no high school in the area, so students had to be bused 23 miles (37 km) each way to Simi Valley for school.

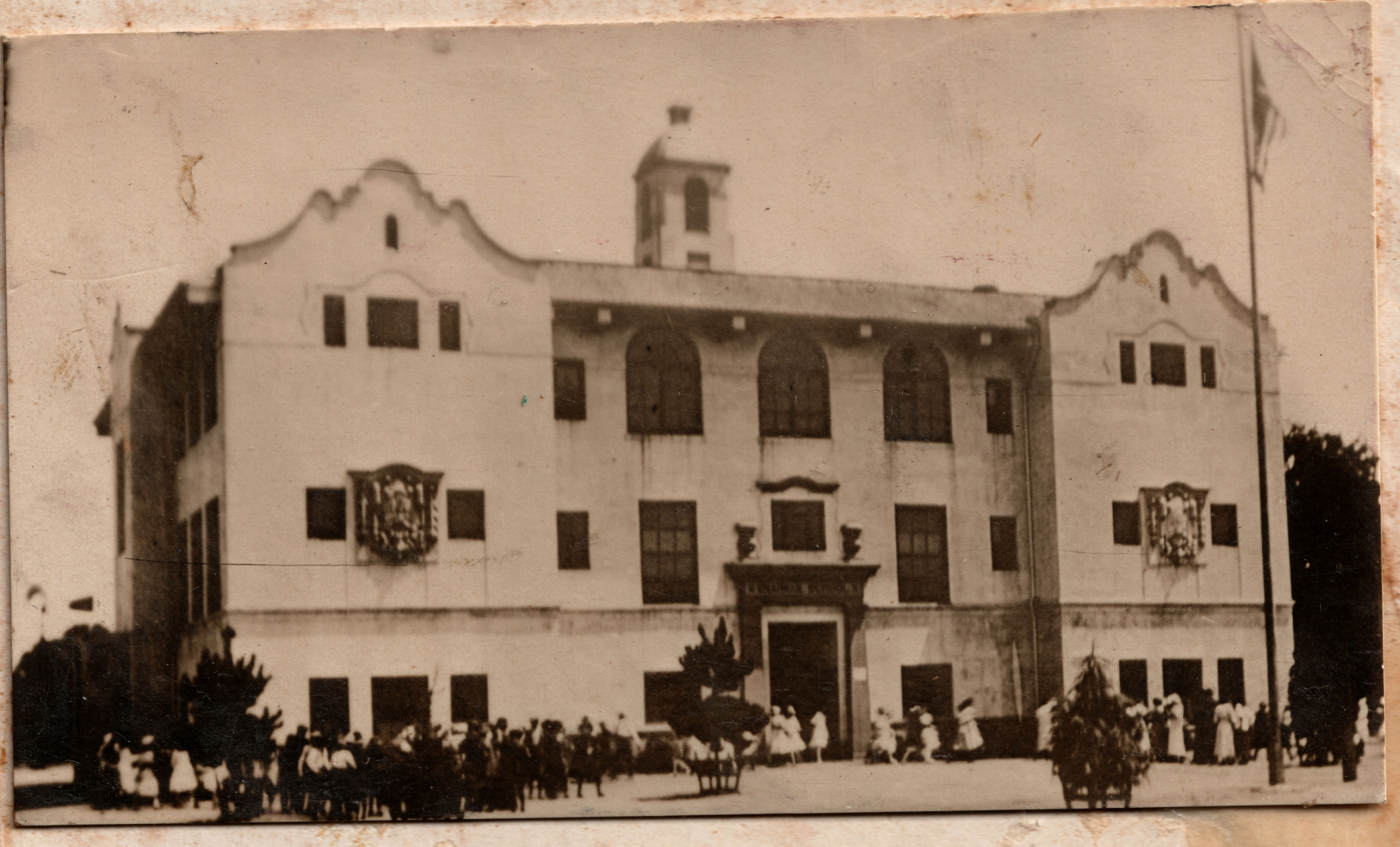
1914-10-22 Oak Park Grammar School in about 1914

In the early 1970s, residents appealed to the Las Virgenes Unified School District to annex their neighborhood. School district officials were so inclined, but residents of neighboring Agoura Hills considered people in Oak Park to be lower class. In a 1974 school board meeting where the idea was discussed, one woman complained about Oak Park's "little dope addicts," after which a fight broke out between her husband and an Oak Park resident, and the idea was scrapped.

In 1977, voters approved a measure to create their own school district, followed by a $40-million bond measure to finance new classrooms. Oak Park High School opened in 1981.

Since 2004, the district has also accepted out-of-district students through the State's District of Choice (DOC) program. These permits do not require a release from resident districts. Both traditional inter-district and District of Choice permits are approved based on the available space within our district. Since becoming a district of choice, Oak Park has become a more diverse district. Prior to becoming a DOC District, the student demographics were 90% white. In the 2019-20 school year the student demographics were 56% White, 25% Asian, 10% Latino, 1.5% Black, and 6% two or more races. In 2021-22, about half of all Oak Park students are attending school under with the interdistrict permit or the DOC program. Since 2000 there have been no new homes built in Oak Park and the resident population has remained approximately the same.

== School ==
The district's seven schools are:

=== High schools ===
- Oak Park High School
- Oak View High School
- Oak Park Independent School

=== Middle schools ===
- Medea Creek Middle School

=== Elementary schools ===
- Brookside Elementary School
- Oak Hills Elementary School
- Red Oak Elementary School
