= Zack Thornton =

American baseball player and coach (born 1998)

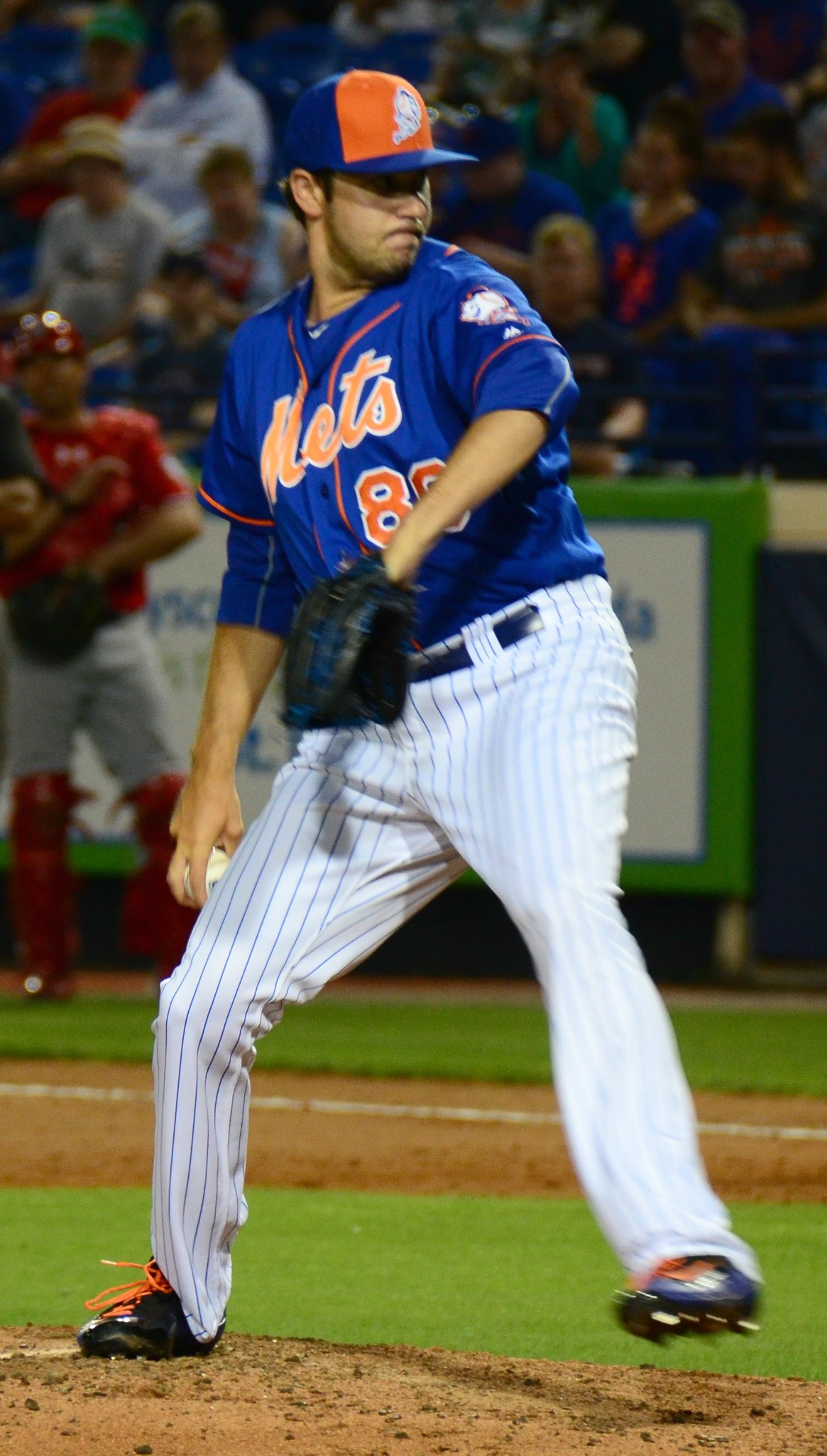
- Thornton with the New York Mets in spring training
- Pitcher / Coach
- Born: May 19, 1988 (age 38); Oak Park, California, U.S.
- Bats: Right Throws: Right
- Stats at Baseball Reference

Zachary James Thornton (born May 19, 1988) is an American former professional baseball pitcher. He is currently the pitching coach for the UC Davis Aggies.

Pitching for Oak Park High School, Thornton was All-State in California. At Ventura College, in 2008 he was 11–1 and was First Team all-SoCal and named to the Western State Conference North Team. Transferring to the University of Oregon, in his senior year in 2010 he was 9–0 and was named Pac-10 honorable mention. The Oakland Athletics selected Thornton in the 23rd round of the 2010 MLB draft, and he signed. In 2011, Thornton was a Midwest League All Star. In 2013, he was named a MiLB.com Pittsburgh Pirates Organization All-Star. In 2015, he was named the Venezuelan Winter League's Setup Pitcher of The Year. He pitched for Team Israel at the 2017 World Baseball Classic.

== Early life ==
Thornton was born in Los Angeles, California, and grew up in Oak Park, California. His parents are James and Robin Thornton (a New York native), and he has a brother named Sam.

== High school ==
He attended and graduated in 2006 from Oak Park High School in Oak Park, California. Pitching for the baseball team, Thornton was All-State, all-California Interscholastic Federation (CIF), and all-Tri-Valley League.

== College ==
Thornton enrolled at Ventura College. He pitched for the baseball team in 2007 and 2008. In his sophomore year he was 11–1 with a 1.12 ERA in 89 innings, and was named to the First Team all-SoCal Team and the Western State Conference North Team. The San Francisco Giants selected Thornton in the 43rd round of the 2008 MLB draft, but he opted not to sign.

He transferred to the University of Oregon, to continue his college career with the Oregon Ducks. In his junior year in 2009, Thornton suffered a right shoulder injury, which he had surgically corrected, releasing the capsule to allow his shoulder to have unhindered internal rotation. In his senior year in 2010 he was 9–0 (his 9 wins matching the Oregon single-season record, and his 1.000 winning percentage setting the Oregon single-season record) with a 3.40 ERA (10th in the Conference) in 90 innings in which he struck out 73 batters and walked 16, and was named Pac-10 honorable mention. The Oakland Athletics selected Thornton in the 23rd round of the 2010 MLB draft, and he signed.

== Minor leagues ==
=== Oakland Athletics ===
Thornton pitched in 2010 for the AZL Athletics of the Rookie Arizona League and the Vancouver Canadians of the Low–A Northwest League.

In 2011, Thornton had a 5–4 win–loss record, a 2.39 earned run average, and 82 strikeouts in 83 innings for the Burlington Bees of the Single–A Midwest League, and made one appearance for the Midland RockHounds of the Double–A Texas League. At mid-season, he appeared in the Midwest League All-Star Game. He pitched for the Stockton Ports of the High–A California League in 2012, going 4–0 with 16 saves (2nd in the league, and 4th among Oakland minor leaguers) and a 4.53 ERA and 70 strikeouts in 53 2/3 innings.

=== Pittsburgh Pirates ===
On November 30, 2012, the Athletics traded Thornton to the Pittsburgh Pirates in exchange for pitcher Chris Resop.

In the 2013 season, Thornton pitched for the Bradenton Marauders of the High–A Florida State League, the Altoona Curve of the Double–A Eastern League, and the Indianapolis Indians of the Triple–A International League. He was a combined 7–3 with 5 saves and a 2.63 ERA, and recorded 90 strikeouts to 12 walks in 75 1/3 innings, as he kept opponents to a .204 batting average. His 31 strikeouts and 4 walks in Triple–A for a 7.75 K/BB ratio was fourth-best among International League pitchers with at least 25 innings pitched. Thornton was named a MiLB.com Pittsburgh Pirates Organization All-Star. He pitched for the Scottsdale Scorpions in 2013 in the Arizona Fall League, where he had a 3.07 ERA. Thornton was considered a potential selection in the 2013 Rule 5 draft, but was not selected. Thornton began the 2014 season with Indianapolis, going 2–0 with a 1.23 ERA.

=== New York Mets ===
On April 18, 2014, the Pirates traded Thornton and a player to be named later to the New York Mets in exchange for first baseman Ike Davis. Thornton pitched as a reliever for the Las Vegas 51s of the Triple–A Pacific Coast League, going 1–5 with a 4.22 ERA and 65 strikeouts in 59 2/3 innings. He then pitched in three games for Navegantes del Magallanes in the 2015 Venezuelan Winter League.

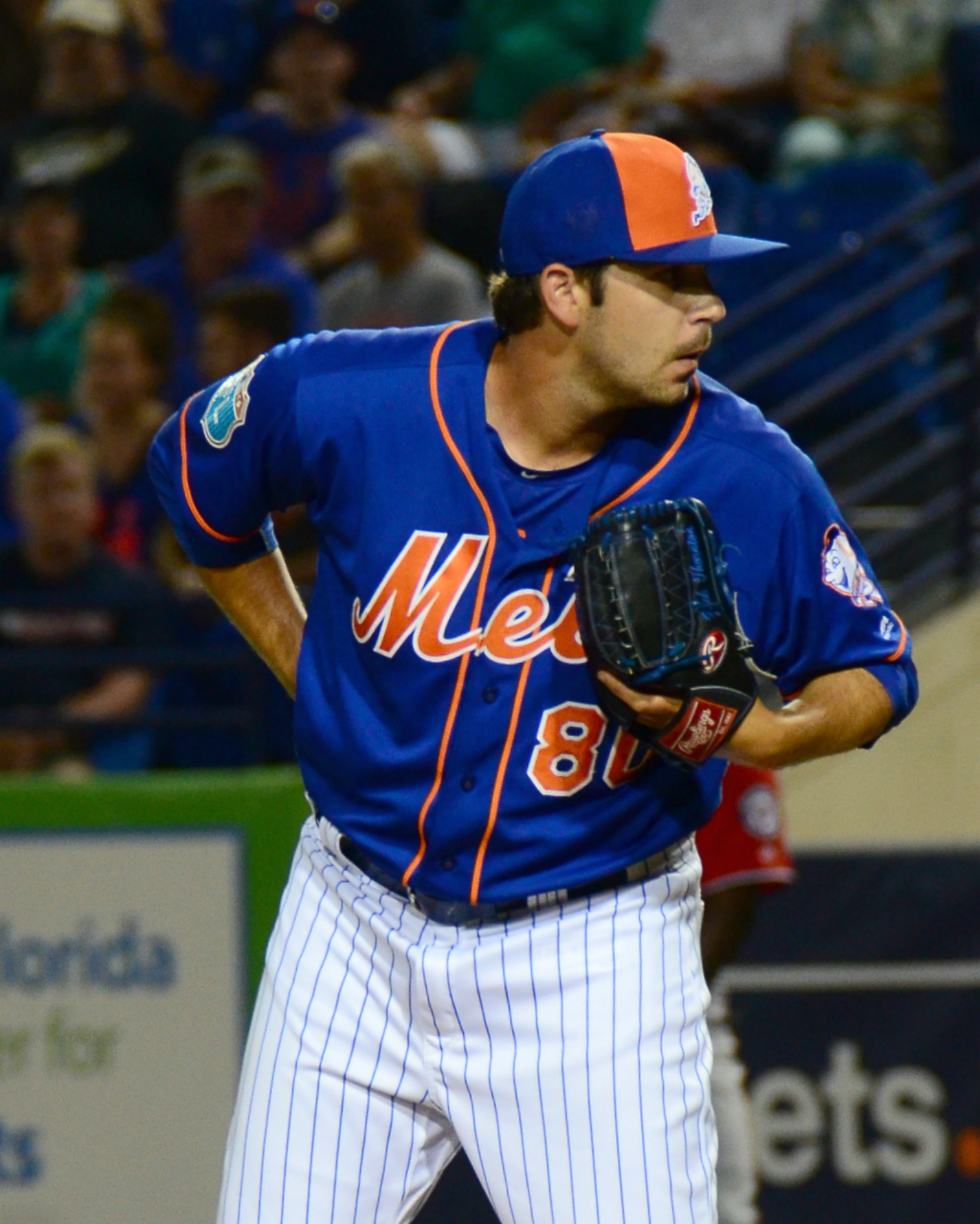
Thornton with the New York Mets in 2016

In 2015, Thornton pitched again for Las Vegas, going 4–4 with a 3.94 ERA in 63 games. That winter Thornton again pitched for Navegantes del Magallanes, and was named the Venezuelan Winter League's Setup Pitcher of The Year. In 2016, he pitched again for Las Vegas, going 0–3 with a 7.03 ERA. Thornton elected free agency following the season on November 7, 2016.

=== Southern Maryland Blue Crabs ===
On May 30, 2017, Thornton signed with the Southern Maryland Blue Crabs of the independent Atlantic League of Professional Baseball. In 47 relief appearances, he was 2–4 with 2 saves and a 3.63 ERA. He became a free agent after the season.

== Team Israel: World Baseball Classic ==
On February 1, 2017, Thornton wrote on Twitter: "I'm excited to announce that I will be playing for Team Israel in the World Baseball Classic!" He pitched for Team Israel at the 2017 World Baseball Classic in March 2017.
