= Booker T. Washington High School (Pensacola, Florida) =

Secondary school in Pensacola, Florida, United States

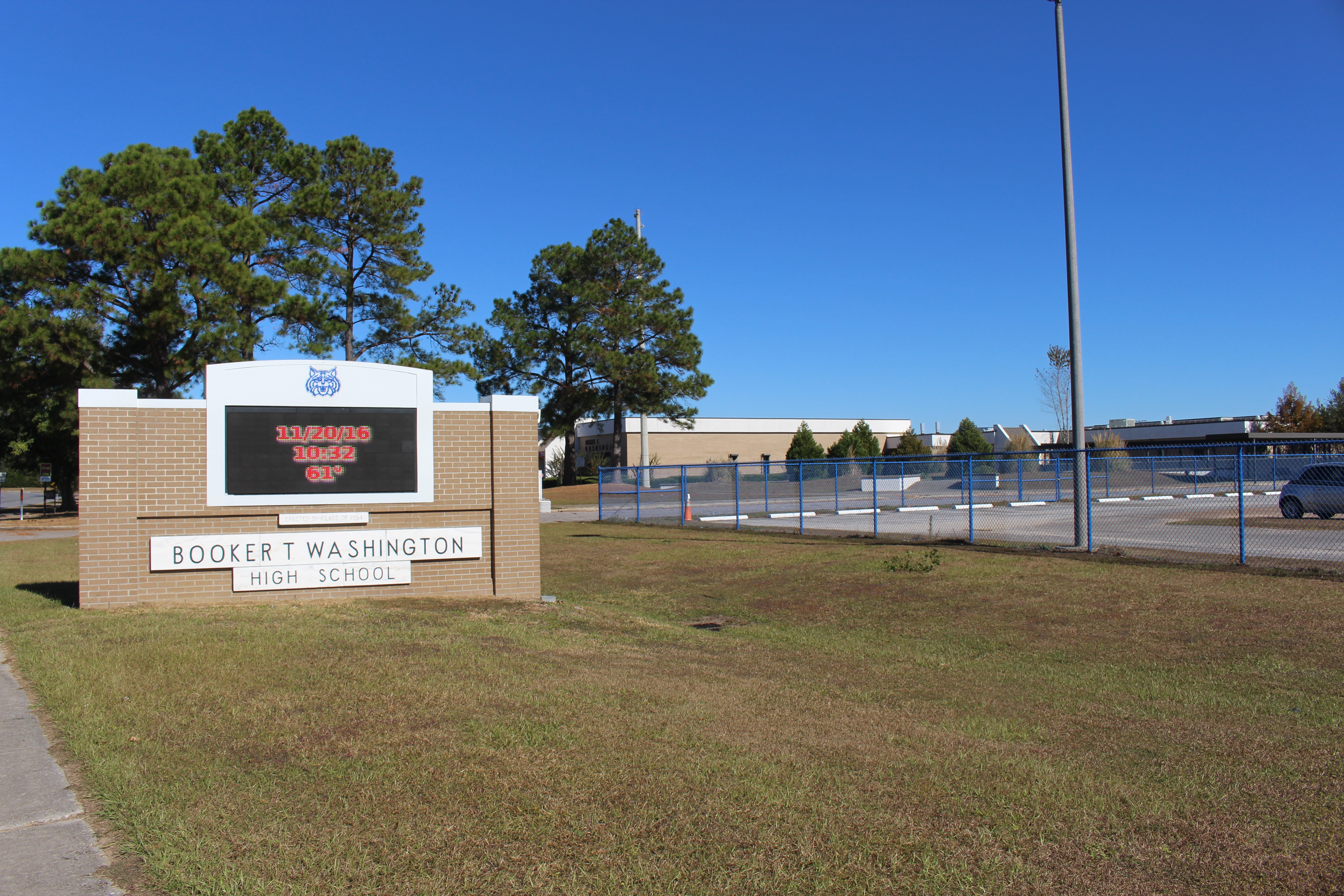

Location
- 6000 College Parkway; Pensacola, Escambia County, Florida 32503; United States; 30°29′06″N 87°12′37″W

Information
- School type: Comprehensive Public High School
- Motto: "The Citadel of Learning"
- Established: 1912
- School district: Escambia County School District
- Principal: Richard Shackle
- Assistant Principal: Sherita Williams (Facilities)
- Assistant Principal: Amy Gordon (Curriculum)
- Staff: 66.00 (FTE)
- Grades: 9-12
- Gender: Coeducational
- Enrollment: 1,676 (2024-2025)
- Student to teacher ratio: 22.80
- Colors: Royal Blue, White, and Gold
- Song: I'm So Glad
- Fight song: Southern University Fight Song
- Mascot: Wildcat
- Rival: Pensacola High School
- Accreditation: Florida State Department of Education
- Yearbook: Graffiti
- Website: washingtonhs.escambiaschools.org

Booker T. Washington High School (BTWHS) is a public secondary school located in Pensacola, Florida, part of the Escambia County School District. It was named after the African-American education pioneer Booker T. Washington. The previous location for the school is now in use as the J.E. Hall Center.

== History ==
The school first opened in 1916 as a segregated black school and remained that way until 1969, when it was integrated as a result of a federal court order. It moved from its previous location on Texar Drive in 1982 to College Parkway.

== Notable alumni ==
- Beth Barr, University of Texas All-American backstroker, and 1988 Seoul Olympics silver medalist for the United States in the 4x100-meter medley relay
- Derrick Brooks, NFL linebacker
- Ladarius Green, former NFL tight end
- Daniel James Jr., aka Daniel "Chappie" James Jr., first African-American four-star general in the United States Armed Forces
- Roy Jones Jr., former world champion boxer
- Alex Leatherwood, NFL offensive tackle
- Jerry Pate, pro golfer and golf course designer

== See also ==
- List of things named after Booker T. Washington
