= Catiana Vitanza =

American professional soccer player (born 1990)

Personal information
- Full name: Catiana S. Vitanza
- Date of birth: October 2, 1990 (age 36)
- Place of birth: Los Angeles, California, U.S.
- Height: 5 ft 3 in (1.60 m)
- Positions: Midfielder; forward

Youth career
- 1995–2001: AYSO/Allstars
- 2001–2007: Coast Soccer Premier League
- 2004–2006: Oak Park High School

Senior career*
Years	Team	Apps	(Gls)
2007–2008	ŽFK Mašinac		
2008–2009	Eurospin Torres		
2011–2012	Ajax America		
2012–2013	FCF Como		
2014–2014	Santa Clarita Blue Heat		
2014–2018	LA Hotspur F.C.		
- * Club domestic league appearances and goals

Catiana S. "Cat" Vitanza (born October 2, 1990 in Los Angeles, California) is an American professional soccer player. She currently is a soccer coach. She also holds Italian citizenship.

== Early life ==
Catiana started her career playing in AYSO, AYSO Allstars, and Coast Soccer Premier League. She attended Oak Park High School (California) and played on the women's Varsity soccer team where they became CIF Participant and Tri Valley League Champions.

== Playing career ==
=== ŽFK Mašinac PZP ===
Vitanza began her professional career in Nis, Serbia when she signed with top women's club ŽFK Mašinac PZP Niš in 2007. In signing with the club, she made history (along with her sister Aricca Vitanza) by becoming the first female American players to play in the Balkans. She played with Mašinac for their 2006/2007 season, coming in second place in the league. In 2008, Vitanza again signed with the club and helped them become champions of the Serbian Prva Liga as well as win the Serbian League Cup. She went on to aid Mašinac in UEFA Women's Champions League 2008–09 (formerly known as 2008–09 UEFA Women's Cup).

=== Torres Calcio Femminile ===
Vitanza signed with Italian club Torres Calcio Femminile for the 2008/09 Serie A season. She helped Torres finish in second place in the Scudetto and earn their spot in UEFA Women's Champions League 2009-10. Vitanza also aided Torres in Italian Women's Cup and the Supercoppa Italiana competition, in which they defeated rivals A.S.D. CF Bardolino in the final. Following Supercoppa competition, Vitanza participated in UEFA Champions League with Torres, in which they went on to defeat champion clubs from various European countries to ultimately reach the quarter-final stage.

=== Ajax America Women ===
In 2011/2012 Vitanza signed with top club Ajax America Women of the WPSL. She played as a midfielder.

=== FCF Como ===
In September 2012, Vitanza returned to Italy and signed with FCF Como for the 2012/2013 season of the Italian Serie A (women's football). She played as a defender.

=== Lincoln Ladies F.C. ===
In July 2013, Catiana was offered a spot on the roster of the Lady Imps Lincoln Ladies F.C., but unable to reach a contract agreement, Catiana returned to Los Angeles.

=== Houston Dash ===
In March 2014, Catiana joined Houston Dash of the NWSL for preseason camp, however due to an ankle injury left camp and returned to Los Angeles for treatment.

=== Santa Clarita Blue Heat and LA Hotspur F.C. ===
In May 2014, after being declared injury free, she signed with two semi-pro teams in the USL W-League and WPSL, Santa Clarita Blue Heat and LA Hotspur F.C. She is currently playing for both teams this summer of 2014.

== Personal life ==
Vitanza has a sister Aricca Vitanza who is also a professional soccer player. They played together in their youth careers and in their senior careers at ŽFK Mašinac, Torres Calcio, Ajax America, and FCF Como.
