= Henry Harris (American football) =

American football player

No. 52 – Georgia Bulldogs
- Position: Linebacker

Personal information
- Listed height: 6 ft 3 in (1.91 m)
- Listed weight: 245 lb (111 kg)

Career information
- College: Georgia (1983–1986)

Awards and highlights
- Second-team All-SEC (1986)

Henry Harris (born c. 1965) is a former American college football player, who was a linebacker at the University of Georgia in Athens. In 1982, while attending Columbia High School in Decatur, Georgia, he was named USA Today Defensive Player of the Year and was named in their All-USA high school team.

Harris never played in the National Football League.

Currently, he is the Facilities and Equipment manager at Alabama A&M University.
