= George Stone Technical Center =

Trade school in Florida, United States

The George Stone Technical College is a public technical college in Escambia County, Florida. Its purpose is to help adults and teenagers learn a career trade. It is located near Pine Forest High School.
