= Northview High School (Century, Florida) =

American public high school

Coordinates: 30.9672222°N 87.4066667°W

Location
- 4100 W Highway 4 Century, Escambia County, Florida 32535-3530; United States

Information
- School type: Public high school
- Established: 1994
- School district: Escambia County School District
- School code: 1231
- Principal: Michael Sherrill
- Teaching staff: 30.00 (FTE)
- Grades: 9-12
- Gender: Coeducational
- Student to teacher ratio: 17.73
- Colors: Garnet and Gold
- Mascot: Chief
- Website: northviewhs.escambiaschools.org

Northview High School is a high school located in Century, Florida, United States. It is listed as a 1A school and has been serving North Escambia County, Florida since 1996. Student enrollment averages between 500 and 600 students. Northview High School has had only two principals, Ms. Gayl Weaver and Mr. Michael Sherril.

== History ==
During the 1990s, the Escambia County School District merged two existing 1A high schools (Century High School and Ernest Ward High School) in northern Escambia County into one school. Construction was started on Northview in 1994 and finished in 1994. In 1993, incoming high school and middle school students from Carver Middle School and Ernest Ward Middle School were asked to cast a ballot for their new school's mascot. The mascot selected was a Chief and the colors were garnet and gold. The colors were chosen as a homage to the Florida State Seminoles, as the school's football helmets are embellished with a spear, as well as the color scheme selected by the ballots cast. In 2009 the helmet emblem was revised and is now a tomahawk with the word "Chiefs" written over it.

The Northview High School football team of 2012-2013 was the first team in the school's history to earn the Florida Class 1A State Football Championship in Orlando at the Citrus Bowl on Dec. 7. They played against undefeated Trenton High School, and walked away with the title in a 42–21 victory. The players earned their state championship rings on April 29 in a school/community ceremony.

== Book Ban Controversy ==
In 2022, Northview High English teacher Vicki Baggett began a campaign to have several books banned from Escambia School District libraries, citing the Florida Parental Rights in Education Act. The list of books included many books focusing on growing up prejudice for being a racial or sexual minority including When Wilma Rudolph Played Basketball, the non-fiction autobiography of Wilma Rudolph.

Baggett claimed on her Facebook page to be a member of United Daughters of the Confederacy and was accused by former and then-current students of pushing racist and homophobic beliefs in class. Baggett discouraged miscegenation and pushed stereotypes about black people not being able to swim. She also accused a student's sister of faking being a lesbian for attention because of her belief that "nobody's born that way".

When concerns were brought to Principal Sherril about Baggett's actions in 2019 by a parent of a student, the specific concerns were not addressed, but Sherril called the teacher "a good person". When Popular Information reached out to the Escambia County School District for comment in 2022, they similarly did not address specific concerns about Baggett, but stated "We categorically condemn any form of discriminatory speech. Our mission is to reach all students, regardless of race, background, or gender identity" while taking no action against her.

== Alumni ==
- Elvin Mims, former basketball player
