= John Foley (American football) =

American football player

Profile
- Position: Linebacker

Personal information
- Born: c. 1967; Chicago, Illinois
- Listed height: 6 ft 4 in (1.93 m)
- Listed weight: 238 lb (108 kg)

Career information
- High school: Chicago (IL) St. Rita
- College: Notre Dame

John Foley is a retired American college football linebacker who played for coach Lou Holtz at the University of Notre Dame. In 1985 while playing for St. Rita High School in Chicago, Illinois, he was named as the USA Today High School Defensive Player of the Year. Gatorade All America, Parade All America, US Army All America. Chicago Sun Times and Chicago Tribune Player of the Year. Ohio Club Top three players in the USA.

Rated top 22 High School football players of all time by Tom Lemming and Taylor Bell book The Second Season.

Foley did not play any games in the National Football League he suffer a spinal Injury in 1988 Cotton Bowl.

In 1997 he began work at Key Bank and Oppenheimer is ranked one of the top Institutional Brokers on Wall Street the last 12 years. John is board member of the Holtz Hero's organization.

John Foley lives in Texas and has three sons Ryan, Tyler, and Nick. He also has a grandson, Knox, and a granddaughter, Eleanor.
