= Quintus McDonald =

American football player (born 1966)

No. 96
- Position: Linebacker

Personal information
- Born: December 14, 1966 (age 59); Rockingham, North Carolina, U.S.
- Listed height: 6 ft 3 in (1.91 m)
- Listed weight: 259 lb (117 kg)

Career information
- High school: Montclair (NJ)
- College: Penn State
- NFL draft: 1989: 6th round, 155th overall pick

Career history
- Indianapolis Colts (1989–1991); San Francisco 49ers (1993)*
- * Offseason or practice squad member only

Awards and highlights
- National champion (1986)

Career NFL statistics
- Sacks: 2
- Stats at Pro Football Reference

Quintus Alonzo McDonald (born December 14, 1966) is an American former professional football player who was a linebacker in the National Football League (NFL). He played college football for the Penn State Nittany Lions.

== Early life ==
In 1984, while attending Montclair (NJ) High School, McDonald was named USA Today High School Defensive Player of the Year.

McDonald played at Penn State University as a 6'3' 259 lb. linebacker.

== Professional career ==
McDonald was selected by the Indianapolis Colts in the sixth round of the 1989 NFL draft (155th overall). He played in 40 games between 1989 and 1991 for the Colts. He wore jersey number 96.
