= Woodham High School =

High school in Florida, United States

Coordinates: 30.4974184°N 87.2480277°W

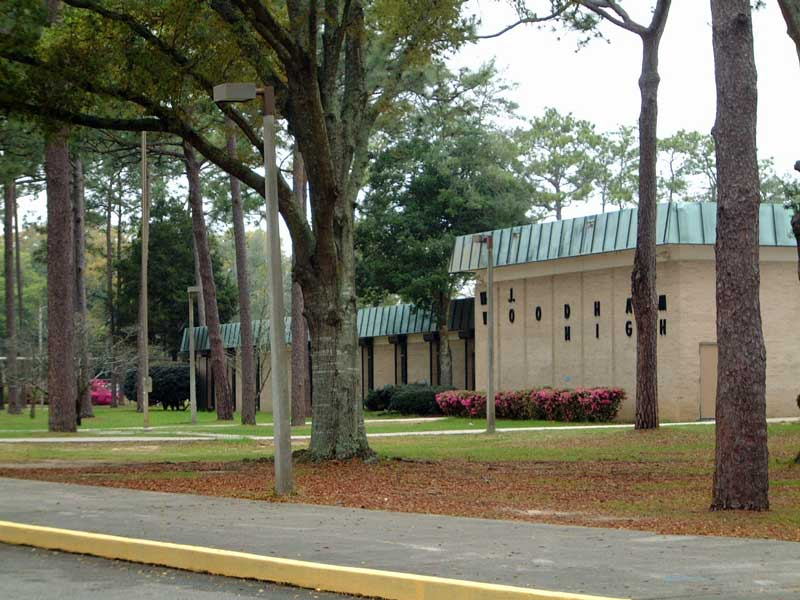

Location
- 150 East Burgess Road; Pensacola, Florida 32503

Information
- School type: Public secondary
- Established: 1965
- Closed: 2007
- School district: Escambia County School District
- Superintendent: None
- President: None
- Faculty: about 650
- Grades: 9–12
- Campus size: 5,600ft
- Colors: Columbia Blue and White
- Mascot: Titans
- Accreditation: Florida Department of Education
- Newspaper: The Oracle, Titans Newsletter
- Yearbook: Mnemosyne
- Website: Website at the Internet Archive

Woodham High School was a secondary school located in Pensacola, Florida. The high school was closed after nearly 42 years of operation in May 2007. It is now known as Woodham Middle School. Woodham Middle School is now closed and West Florida High School of Advanced Technology and its faculty, staff, and students have transferred over from Longleaf Drive to the old school grounds of Woodham Middle School and is now located there.

The school is named for Dr. William Jesse Woodham, Jr., a former Escambia County School District superintendent.

Woodham High School was the only high school in Escambia County to have a Law Academy, as well as to have a Future Educators Academy. In addition, Woodham also sported a Health Science Program.

== History ==
Woodham High School was opened in 1965, in response to the tremendous growth of Pensacola's northern suburbs. This move took the pressure off of Pensacola High School, which at the time was suffering from severe overcrowding.

Woodham itself also experienced overcrowding in the early-to-mid 1970s as students from Gulf Breeze, Fl. were bused to Woodham before a separate high school was constructed in Gulf Breeze. Woodham students attended split class sessions, with half of the student body attending in the morning and the other half attending in the afternoon. In the fall of 1975 Pine Forest High School opened and some Woodham students were reassigned. The first day of class at Pine Forest High was Monday, November 10, 1975 for the former Woodham students. Another reassignment occurred in 1982 when Booker T. Washington High School was rebuilt in its present location.

In the late 1970s, Woodham featured a marching band which wore the same style of uniforms as the University of Southern California Trojan marching band. The band boosters worked for over two years to purchase these uniforms under the direction of Band booster President Ronald Campbell with the assistance and overwhelming support of band families. The marching band, concert band and jazz-rock ensemble (JRE) all posted "superior" ratings at state contests.

The football team won district titles in 1981,1982,1984, and 1985. In 1982 and 1984, the "Fighting Titans" won the state Class 4A championship and, for a period of time, were ranked number one in the nation by USA Today. The 1982-4 seasons featured a 35 and 1 record, losing only to Choctaw by a score of 9 to 7 during the 1983 regular season. The game-winning field goal by John Laycock was taken off the scoreboard with no time remaining. In 1991 the boys' soccer team won the Class 3A state title. The school's boys' basketball team won the Florida Class 4A state championship in 2003. Woodham's baseball team also won back-to-back District 1 Class 4A championships in 2002 and 2003.

In March 2000, Woodham High School's Varsity Cheerleading squad won its first national championship at the American Open Cheerleading Competition. The team of 15 members won the title in the Small Varsity division. The squad was featured in the August 2000 issue of American Cheerleader Magazine.

Hurricane Ivan, which struck the Pensacola area on 16 September 2004, damaged several parts of the school. The cafeteria and media center sustained moderate damage but were repaired within a few weeks.

In the fall of 2005, the Escambia County School District and the superintendent, Jim Paul, discussed plans of closing Woodham and converting it into a middle school for Brentwood and Wedgewood Middle schools. The plan, approved by the school board as of December 21, 2006, took effect beginning with the 2007–2008 school year. The Woodham students were re-districted to other area high schools. The textbooks and library books were distributed to other district high schools based on the percentage of Woodham students attending the other high schools. Wendy Zirkin, acting district media coordinator for Escambia County was in charge of the textbook and library inventory and distribution.

On May 27, 2007, Woodham held its final classes. Its website now reads: "In memory of all Titans, 1965-2007."

Woodham was reopened as a middle school later in 2007. Woodham Middle School is now closed. The building now houses West Florida High School.

== Notable alumni ==
- Reggie Evans, NBA basketball player for the Brooklyn Nets
- Justin Gatlin, 2000, gold medal winner in the 2004 Summer Olympics and former world record holder in the Men's 100m. 2016, Olympic Silver Medalist in 100m
- David Lee, Dallas Cowboys assistant coach and offensive coordinator for the Arkansas Razorbacks football
- Greg Litton, MLB baseball player for the San Francisco Giants
- Calvin Smith, MISL goalkeeper, St. Louis Steamers 1994 - 1998
- Hosken Powell, Former MLB player (Minnesota Twins, Toronto Blue Jays)
- Tyronne Green, NFL player (San Diego Chargers)
- Ron Stallworth, NFL player
- Jim Barrineau, 1976 Olympic high jumper

Woodham Middle School
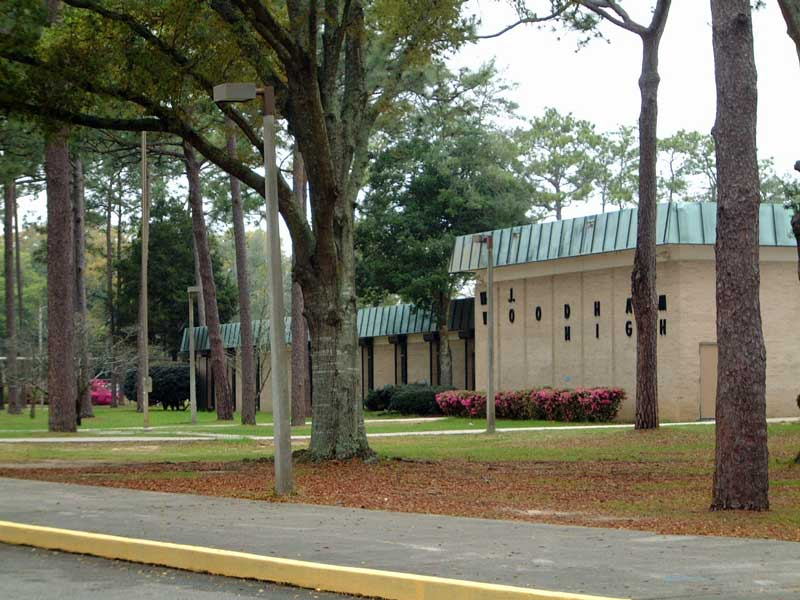

Location
- 150 East Burgess Road; Pensacola, Florida 32503

Information
- School type: Public secondary
- Established: August 26, 2007
- School district: Escambia County School District
- Superintendent: Malcom Tomas
- Faculty: about 91
- Grades: 6 to 8
- Enrollment: 578 (2010-2011)
- Campus size: 5,600ft
- Colors: Columbia Blue and White
- Mascot: Titans
- Accreditation: Florida Department of Education
- Newspaper: Woodham Middle Newsletter
- Yearbook: Mnemosyne
- Website: Woodham Middle

- Baratunde A. Cola, Scientist and Engineer, and winner of the 2017 Alan T. Waterman Award

== Woodham Middle School ==
Woodham Middle School is a middle school in Pensacola. It opened on August 26, 2007, on the site of the former Woodham High School. In the 2010–11 school year, it had an enrollment of 575 students.

The school has a total of 26 teachers, teaching grades 6–8.

== History ==
After the closing of Woodham High School the school would later to become a middle school now known as Woodham Middle School (officially known as W.J. Woodham Middle School) and was officially opened August 26, 2007, as a public middle school. The school enrollment has grown in the few past years, the school year of 2010–11 the school enrollment was about 572 students.

== Sports ==
In the 2010–2011 school year, the track team made it to the state finals located in Melbourne, Florida. The relay team placed in 4th in the 4x100 and 4x400 runs. Individuals Abner Johnson placed 4th in the high jump category at 1.68m and Roberson Paul placed 5th in the triple jump category at 11.61m.
