= Agoura, California =

Unincorporated community in California, United States

- Unincorporated community
- Location within Los Angeles County

- Location within the state of California Agoura, California (the United States)
- Coordinates: 34°8′35″N 118°44′13″W
- Country: United States
- State: California
- County: Los Angeles
- Time zone: UTC-8 (Pacific (PST))
  - Summer (DST): UTC-7 (PDT)
- ZIP codes: 91301
- Area codes: 747/818

Agoura (/əˈɡɔːrə/) is an unincorporated community in Los Angeles County, California, United States. Located southeast of the city of Agoura Hills and adjacent to the city of Calabasas, Agoura was the historical name of the area before much of the area was developed and before the incorporation of the city of Agoura Hills. There are a few nearby pockets of unincorporated areas that contain a handful of houses. Much of the area is also often referred to as the neighborhood of Old Agoura. The ZIP code is 91301 and the telephone area codes are 747 and 818.

== History ==
A stagecoach stop here was known as "Vegar Junction" and in the 1920s the community was briefly known as Picture City, as Paramount Pictures owned the Paramount Ranch, a movie ranch filming outdoor scenes and Western movies.

To obtain a post office of its own, the Postal Service required the residents to choose a one-word name, and in 1927 they chose the last name of Pierre Agoure. Pierre was a local French Basque immigrant who had settled in the area in 1871 to live the lifestyle of a Californio rancher, and styled himself Don Pierre Agoure. His name was chosen for the post office as it was the shortest name proposed, but it is unknown whether the changed final letter was an error or an attempt to make it easier to spell or pronounce.

The city of Agoura Hills incorporated in 1982 with the remaining unincorporated areas identified as Agoura.

== Government ==
Los Angeles County Animal Care Services operates the Agoura Animal Care Center in Agoura Hills.

== Notable people ==
- Erik Affholter (born 1966), American football NFL wide receiver
- Brad Delson, lead guitarist of Linkin Park
- Gintaras Grušas, archbishop of Vilnius, Lithuania
- Kario Salem, actor

== See also ==
- Rancho Las Virgenes — 19th-century Mexican land grant in the area
