= Oak Park, California =

- Unincorporated community Census-designated place
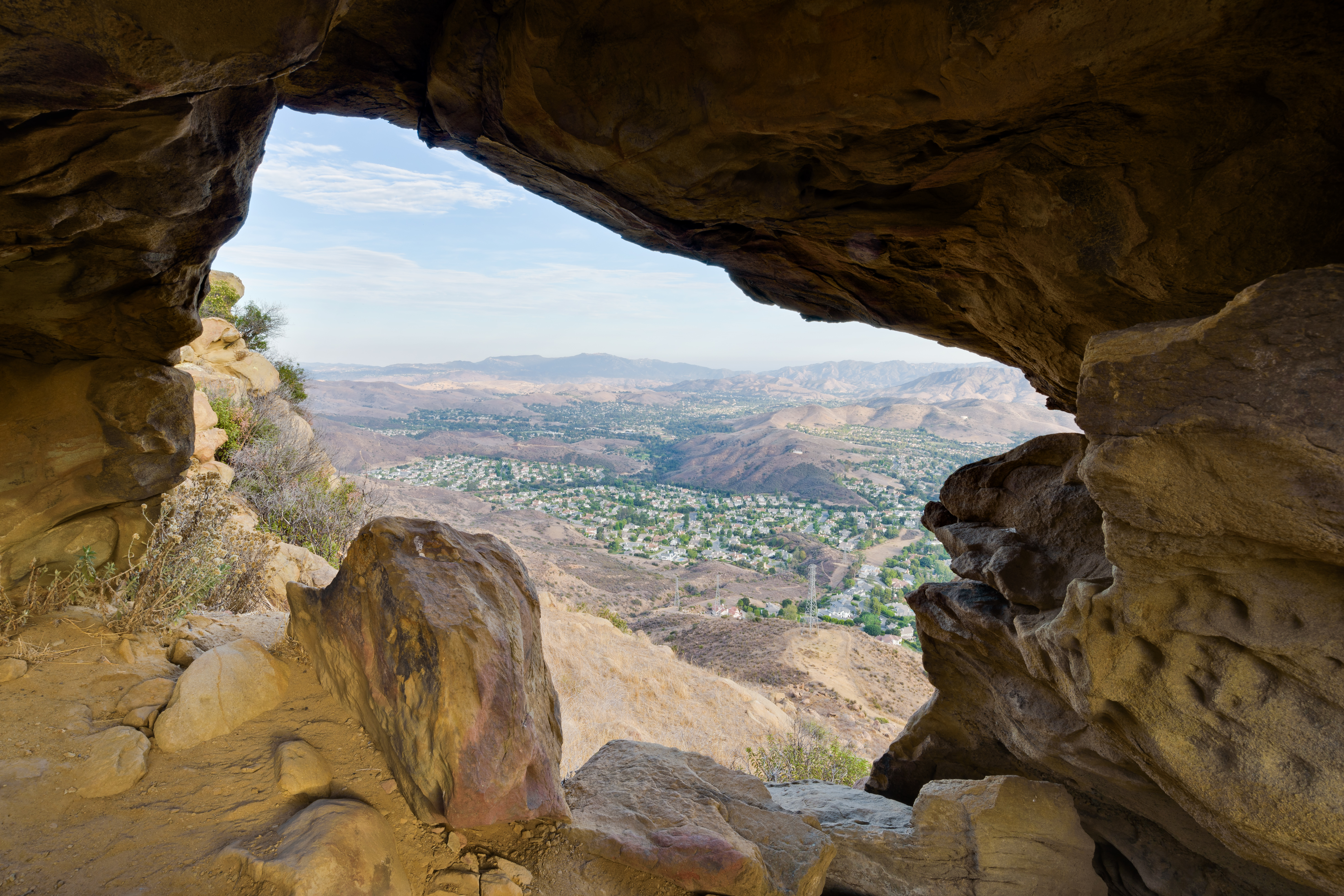
- Oak Park viewed through nearby CoBa Arch in the Simi Hills
- Interactive map of Oak Park, California
- Location in California Location in the United States
- Coordinates: 34°10′18″N 118°45′28″W
- Country: United States
- State: California
- County: Ventura
- Region: Conejo Valley

Government
  - Senate: Henry Stern (D)
  - Assembly: Jacqui Irwin (D)
  - U. S. Congress: Julia Brownley (D)

Area
  - Total: 5.295 sq mi (13.713 km^{2})
  - Land: 5.295 sq mi (13.713 km^{2})
  - Water: 0 sq mi (0 km^{2}) 0%
- Elevation: 1,106 ft (337 m)

Population (2020)
  - Total: 13,898
  - Density: 2,624.9/sq mi (1,013.5/km^{2})
- Time zone: UTC-8 (PST)
  - Summer (DST): UTC-7 (PDT)
- ZIP code: 91377
- Area codes: 747 and 818
- FIPS code: 06-53116
- GNIS feature ID: 1817380

Oak Park is an unincorporated community in southeastern Ventura County, California, United States. When developed in the Simi Hills in the late 1960s, a single road provided the only access to the community from Agoura Hills, in neighboring Los Angeles County. As of the 2020 census, Oak Park had a population of 13,898, up from 13,811 at the 2010 census. For statistical purposes, the United States Census Bureau has defined Oak Park as a census-designated place (CDP). The census definition of the area may not precisely correspond to local understanding of the area with the same name.

Oak Park is the largest unincorporated community in Ventura County. Residents of the community have through votes declined to set up an independent city, and also declined to be annexed into neighboring Thousand Oaks.

== History ==
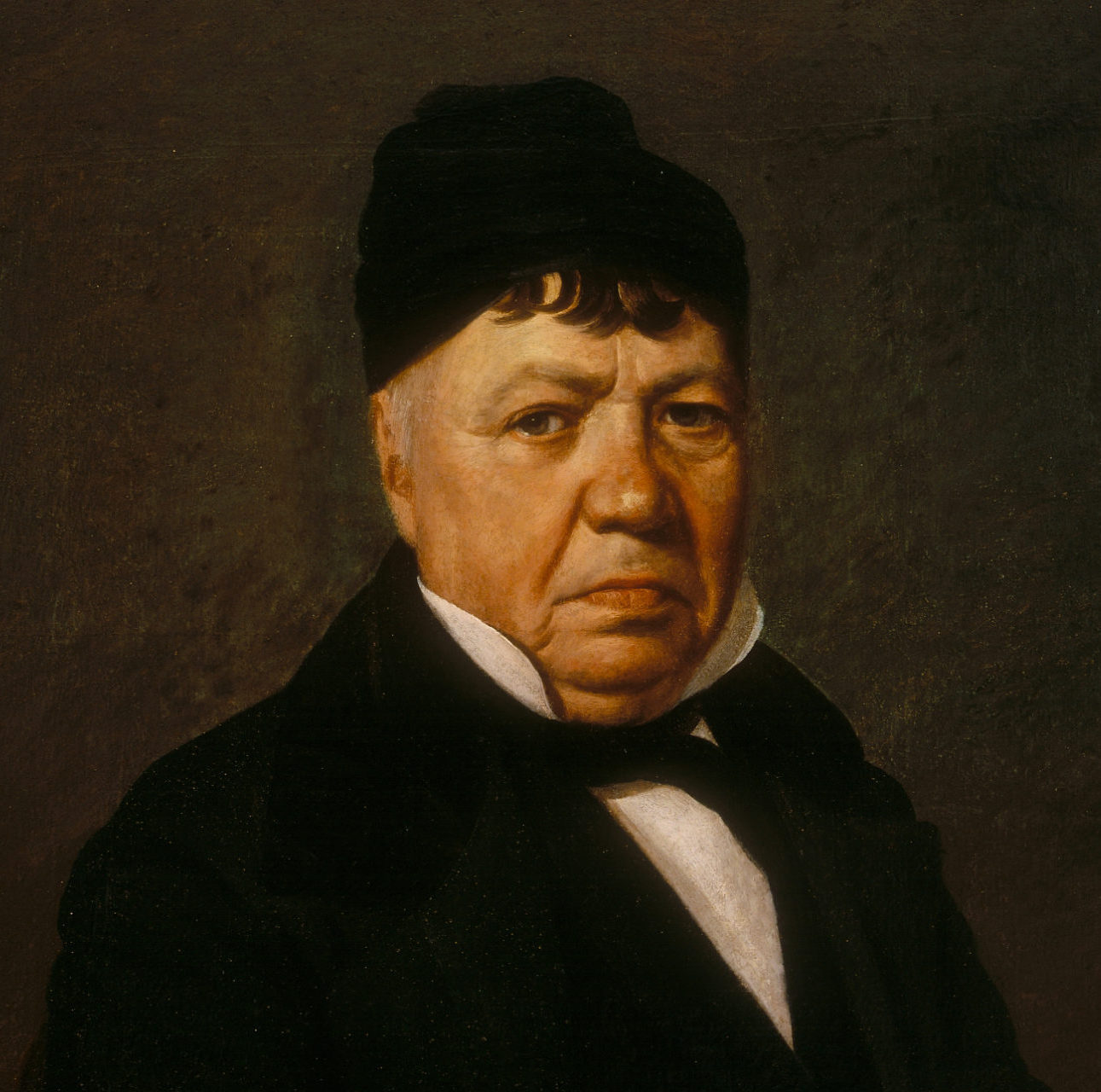
Oak Park was part of Rancho El Conejo, owned by Don José de la Guerra y Noriega, founder of the prominent Guerra family of California.

Oak Park has had human occupation from about 5500 B.C. to the present day. It lies within a zone including the early Millingstone Horizon and inland Chumash Indians. Indians camped throughout the area as they collected acorns, yucca, and other food. The sites in the area include major villages, smaller camps and several rock shelters. Chumash people lived here for thousands of years prior to European contact. They lived off of trading, gathering and hunting. The Chumash originally settled in Oak Park due to an abundance of natural resources, including fresh water, acorns and rabbit-hunting. It is one of the oldest occupied places in California.

The location of Oak Park was originally part of Rancho Simi, a Spanish land concession in Alta California given in 1795 to Francisco Javier Pico, a soldier of the Santa Barbara company, and his two brothers, Patricio Pico and Miguel Pico by the Spanish government. Lindero Canyon Road follows the western border-line (lindero in Spanish) of the land grant.

Throughout the 20th century, studios used the area to film movies and music videos, in particular westerns. The music video “Everything Has Changed” by Taylor Swift ft. Ed Sheeran was filmed at Oak Hills Elementary and Medea Creek Middle School. Movies filmed locally include The Red Pony and A Walk in the Sun.

Oak Park was formed from ranchland owned by Jim and Marian Jordan, stars of the radio show Fibber McGee and Molly. The land was purchased by Metropolitan Development Corporation in the 1960s. Homes were developed starting in the late 1960s. Kanan-Dume Road (named after a local family) was the only access road to the community, from Agoura Hills, California, in neighboring Los Angeles County. As such, the community was served by police and firefighters based in the nearest Ventura County city, Thousand Oaks, 10 miles (16 km) away, with L.A. County services responding when able.

In 1967 Ventura County officials who were concerned about the isolation of the community proposed a land swap with L.A. County, but they were rebuffed. The isolation—coupled with the distance to junior and senior high schools—also drove down the property values, and homeowners found it difficult to sell their properties.

The Ventura County Board of Supervisors created a Municipal Advisory Council (MAC) in 1975 to represent the community to County agencies. The MAC persuaded the Ventura County Board of Supervisors to trim Metropolitan Development Corp.'s initial development plan from a population of 26,000. Today there are about 15,000 residents. All available land within Oak Park has now been developed, with the remaining vacant land owned by the Rancho Simi Recreation and Park District.

The community was initially served by the Simi Valley Unified School District, with the nearest post-elementary schools being Sinaloa Junior High (about 20 miles (32 km) away) and Royal High (about 22 (35 km) miles away). Since the Simi Valley Unified School District had no plans to build post-elementary schools in Oak Park, the residents seceded and formed Oak Park Unified School District in June 1977. Medea Creek Middle School started at the current location of the school district in 1980 using portable classrooms. The campus was affectionately called "Bungalow Hill" by students. The middle school was grades 6-8, with sixth-graders spending morning hours at Brookside Elementary and afternoons at the middle school. The following year when Oak Park High School opened for classes, Medea Creek Middle School shared the campus. Oak Park High School's class of 1983 was the first graduating class. They were the maiden class; they were upperclassmen each year ninth through 12th grade.

In 1999 the United States Postal Service assigned Oak Park its own ZIP code, 91377. Oak Park previously shared the ZIP code 91301 with its neighboring town of Agoura Hills.

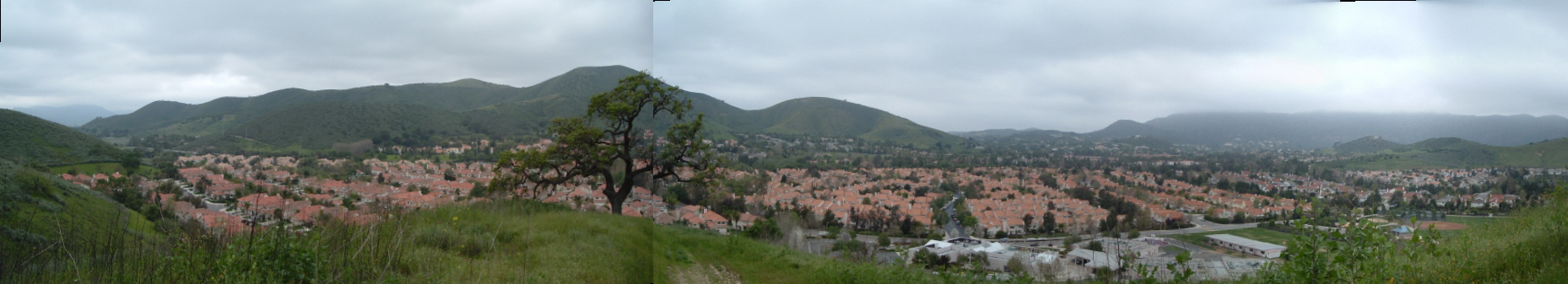
Panoramic shot of Oak Park.

== Geography ==
Oak Park is situated in southeastern Ventura County. It is bordered on the west by North Ranch (Thousand Oaks) and on the south by the LA County cities of Agoura Hills and Westlake Village. It borders the Santa Monica Mountains National Recreation Area to the east and north.

Oak Park is located at 34°10'18" North, 118°45'28" West (34.171756, -118.757899). It is bordered by the Santa Monica Mountains National Recreational Area on the north and east and Rancho Simi Open Space on the south. It sits within valleys in the Simi Hills, capped by Simi Peak, which borders the community to the north. The elevation in Oak Park varies from 960 to 2,157 feet above sea level. (Does not include Simi Peak at 2,450 ft)

The CDP has a total area of 5.29 mi^{2} (13.7 km^{2}), all land. However, there are many small creeks in the area. The largest of these creeks are Medea Creek and Lindero Creek, which are tributaries of Malibu Creek, the only waterway that pierces the Santa Monica Mountains. The Malibu Creek watershed covers 105 square miles and contains 225 stream segments.

== Demographics ==
Historical population
Census	Pop.	Note	%±
1990	2,412		—
2000	2,320		−3.8%
2010	14,266		514.9%
2020	13,898		−2.6%
U.S. Decennial Census; 1850–1870 1880-1890; 1900 1910 1920; 1930 1940 1950; 1960 1970 1980; 1990 2000 2010

Oak Park first appeared as a census designated place in the 1990 U.S. census.

=== 2020 census ===
As of the 2020 census, Oak Park had a population of 13,898 and a population density of 2,624.7 inhabitants per square mile (1,013.4/km^{2}). The median age was 43.7 years. 23.1% of residents were under the age of 18, 7.4% were aged 18 to 24, 21.5% were aged 25 to 44, 32.7% were aged 45 to 64, and 15.3% were 65 years of age or older. For every 100 females there were 92.6 males, and for every 100 females age 18 and over there were 90.4 males age 18 and over.

The census reported that 99.9% of residents lived in households, 0.1% lived in non-institutionalized group quarters, and no one was institutionalized. 100.0% of residents lived in urban areas, while 0.0% lived in rural areas.

There were 5,200 households in Oak Park, of which 37.0% had children under the age of 18 living in them. Of all households, 60.1% were married-couple households, 4.3% were cohabiting-couple households, 23.1% were households with a female householder and no spouse or partner present, and 12.5% were households with a male householder and no spouse or partner present. About 20.0% of all households were made up of individuals, and 8.6% had someone living alone who was 65 years of age or older. The average household size was 2.67. There were 3,892 families (74.8% of all households).

There were 5,324 housing units at an average density of 1,005.5 units per square mile (388.2 units/km^{2}), of which 5,200 (97.7%) were occupied and 124 (2.3%) were vacant. Of occupied units, 70.4% were owner-occupied and 29.6% were occupied by renters. The homeowner vacancy rate was 0.6%, and the rental vacancy rate was 3.3%.

Racial composition as of the 2020 census
Race	Number	Percent
White	9,493	68.3%
Black or African American	172	1.2%
American Indian and Alaska Native	25	0.2%
Asian	2,694	19.4%
Native Hawaiian and Other Pacific Islander	9	0.1%
Some other race	251	1.8%
Two or more races	1,254	9.0%
Hispanic or Latino (of any race)	1,118	8.0%

=== Demographic estimates ===
In 2023, the US Census Bureau estimated that 22.6% of the population were foreign-born. Of all people aged 5 or older, 74.8% spoke only English at home, 4.7% spoke Spanish, 9.2% spoke other Indo-European languages, 9.6% spoke Asian or Pacific Islander languages, and 1.7% spoke other languages. Of those aged 25 or older, 98.7% were high school graduates and 63.2% had a bachelor's degree.

=== Income and poverty ===
The median household income in 2023 was $160,484, and the per capita income was $80,193. About 1.4% of families and 3.3% of the population were below the poverty line.

=== 2010 census ===
At the 2010 census Oak Park had a population of 14,266. The population density was 2,610.6 inhabitants per square mile (1,008.0/km^{2}). The racial makeup of Oak Park was 11,473 (83.1%) White, 141 (1.0%) African American, 32 (0.2%) Native American, 1,556 (11.3%) Asian, 9 (0.1%) Pacific Islander, 162 (1.2%) from other races, and 438 (3.2%) from two or more races. Hispanic or Latino of any race were 826 people (6.0%).

The census reported that 14,625 people (100% of the population) lived in households, and none (0%) were institutionalized.

There were 5,158 households, 2,112 (40.9%) had children under the age of 18 living in them, 3,054 (59.2%) were opposite-sex married couples living together, 590 (11.4%) had a female householder with no husband present, 184 (3.6%) had a male householder with no wife present. There were 204 (4.0%) unmarried opposite-sex partnerships, and 34 (0.7%) same-sex married couples or partnerships. 1,046 households (20.3%) were one person and 258 (5.0%) had someone living alone who was 65 or older. The average household size was 2.68. There were 3,828 families (74.2% of households); the average family size was 3.14.

The age distribution was 3,622 people (26.2%) under the age of 18, 1,004 people (7.3%) aged 18 to 24, 3,031 people (21.9%) aged 25 to 44, 4,981 people (36.1%) aged 45 to 64, and 1,173 people (8.5%) who were 65 or older. The median age was 41.7 years. For every 100 females, there were 92.6 males. For every 100 females age 18 and over, there were 88.5 males.

There were 5,297 housing units at an average density of 1,001.2 per square mile, of the occupied units 3,842 (74.5%) were owner-occupied and 1,316 (25.5%) were rented. The homeowner vacancy rate was 1.2%; the rental vacancy rate was 3.5%. 10,706 people (77.5% of the population) lived in owner-occupied housing units and 3,104 people (22.5%) lived in rental housing units.

== Education ==
Among residents age 25 or greater, 8% have no education beyond a high school diploma, 18% have some college education without earning a degree, 10% have an associate degree, 34% have a bachelor's degree, and 30% have advanced degrees.

The community is served by the Oak Park Unified School District (OPUSD), which has three elementary schools K-5 (Brookside Elementary, Oak Hills Elementary and Red Oak Elementary), a middle school 6-8 (Medea Creek Middle School), Oak Park High School (9-12), Oak Park Independent School (K-12), and Oak View High School (an alternative high school for ages 16 and above). Oak Park Unified School District was originally part of the Simi Valley Unified School District, but successfully seceded from SVUSD via election in 1977.

Oak Park High School offers a variety of sports including baseball, boys and girls basketball, cheer, STUNT, Cross Country, dance, football, golf, lacrosse, boys and girls soccer, softball, boys and girls tennis, track and field, and boys and girls volleyball. Oak Park is in the Tri-Valley and Frontier League depending on the sport. Oak Park High School's music program includes band, choir, and marching band.

== Notable people ==
- Doja Cat, singer and rapper
- Zachary Gordon
- Peyton List
- Christopher Hoag
- Zack Thornton, baseball player
- Curran Walters

== Flora and fauna ==
An Environmental Impact Assessment of Oak Park was conducted in 1982 which recorded local flora and fauna

=== Fauna ===
85 species of birds have been observed with breeding activity of 32-64 probable. 12 species of raptors were observed. Nesting of 7 was confirmed including American kestrel (Falco sparverius), American barn owl (Tyto furcata), screech owl (Otus asio), red-shouldered hawk (Buteo lineatus). The turkey vulture (Cathartes aura) and the prairie falcon (Falco mexicanus) breed on adjacent slopes. Cooper’s hawk (Accipiter cooperi) and northern harrier (Circus cyanus) may nest in Oak Park. Golden eagles (Aquila chrysaetos) lack suitable nesting habitats and probably live in nearby areas. Two non-raptor birds are classified as sensitive including coastal black-tailed gnatcatcher (Polioptila melanura californica). Possibly less than 1600 pairs of this bird remain alive. The second is grasshopper sparrow (Ammodramus savannarum).

5 species of reptiles were observed including the western fence lizard (Sceloporus occidentalis) and western rattlesnake (Crotalus viridis) and more may exist.

Three species of amphibians were observed in Oak Park: western toad (Bufo boreas), Pacific treefrog (Hyla regilla), and bullfrog (Rana catesbeiana). 8 other amphibians occur in this area and may be present.

35 mammals may be present including bobcat (Felis rufus), coyote (Canis latrans), and desert cottontail (Sylvilagus auduboni).

The Oak Park area and the Simi Hills are part of a wildlife corridor that link the San Gabriel Mountains (Los Padre National Forest) and Santa Susana Mountains to the Santa Monica Mountains. This is a critical path between mountain ranges where animals can find others of the same species for mating.

=== Flora ===
Oak Park ecosystems include several within the chaparral (inland sage scrub, rocklands, northern slope chaparral scrub, southern slope chaparral scrub) and riparian woodland (coast live oak riparian forest, valley oak woodland, southern willow scrub, walnut stands, and oak savanna). Southern California grassland has largely disappeared from the site by overgrazing and housing.

The chaparral and grassland are frequently altered by fires started by natural causes and humans. Both Indians and ranchers have altered the local landscape through fire and grazing. Oak Park had a large uncontrolled fire on October 8, 1982. The most recent uncontrolled fire was the Woolsey Fire on November 8–9, 2018 that burned through Oak Park and surrounding areas.

The recorded flora during the last EIR of Oak Park included 202 vascular plant species distributed among 52 families. Half are found in 5 families: sunflower(Asteraceace), grass (Poaceae), pea (Fabaceae), Mustard (Brassicaceae) and figwort (Scrophulariaceae). Non-native plants constitute 13% of the flora. There are 4 plants classified as sensitive: Catalina Mariposa Lilly (Calochortus catalinae), Wind poppy (Stylomecon heterophylla), Santa Susana Tarweed (Hemizonia minthornii ), and Nolina Parii

== Infrastructure ==
Water is provided by the Calleguas Municipal Water District though the Las Virgenes Municipal Water District. Oak Park sewage is collected and treated by the Triunfo County Sanitation District at the Tapia Water Reclamation Facility on Malibu Canyon Road in Los Angeles County. A joint venture of Calleguas, Las Virgenes and the Triunfo built a pipeline and pump station in 1994 to distribute reclaimed water for landscaping and golf course irrigation.

=== Libraries ===
Public Libraries: Ventura County Library—one of their branches is in Oak Park; Oak Park Library and also, the nearby Agoura branch of the County of Los Angeles Public Library.

== Recreation ==
Open space and parks in Oak Park are managed by the Rancho Simi Recreation and Park District.

=== Open Space ===
- Rock Ridge Open Space
- Sunrise Meadows Open Space
- Wistful Vista Open Space

=== Parks ===
- Chaparral Park
- Deerhill Park
- Eagle View Park
- Indian Springs Park
- Mae Boyar Park
- Medea Creek Park Trail
- Oak Canyon Community Park
- Oak Park Community Garden
- Oak Park Community Center and Gardens
- Valley View Park

=== Trails ===
- Canyon Cove Trail (to Wistful Vista Ridge)
- China Flat / Simi Peak
- Golden Eagle Trail aka Rock Ridge Trail West
- Medea Creek Trail
- Oak Canyon Community Park Nature Trail
- Palo Camado Canyon / Doubletree
- Sandstone Hills Trail
- Suicide aka Rock Ridge Trail East
- Sunrise Meadow Trails - Creekside and Ridge
- Wistful Vista Trail

Oak Park borders the Santa Monica Mountains National Recreation Area. Trails are used for hiking, running, horseback riding, climbing, and mountain biking.
