= Ron Stallworth (American football) =

American football player (born 1966)

No. 96
- Position: Defensive end

Personal information
- Born: February 25, 1966 (age 60); Pensacola, Florida, U.S.
- Listed height: 6 ft 5 in (1.96 m)
- Listed weight: 262 lb (119 kg)

Career information
- High school: Woodham (Pensacola)
- College: Auburn
- NFL draft: 1989: 4th round, 98th overall pick

Career history
- New York Jets (1989–1990); Kansas City Chiefs (1991)*
- * Offseason or practice squad member only

Career NFL statistics
- Sacks: 3
- Fumble recoveries: 1
- Stats at Pro Football Reference

Ronald Tobias Stallworth (born February 25, 1966) is an American former professional football player who was a defensive end for two seasons with the New York Jets of the National Football League (NFL). He was selected by the Jets in the fourth round of the 1989 NFL draft. At 6' 5" 262 lb., Stallworth played college football for the Auburn Tigers in Alabama.

In 1983 while attending Woodham High School in Pensacola, Florida he was named USA Today Defensive High School Player of the Year.

Pre-draft measurables
Height	Weight	40-yard dash	10-yard split	20-yard split	20-yard shuttle	Vertical jump	Broad jump	Bench press
6 ft 4 3/4 in (1.95 m)	257 lb (117 kg)	4.93 s	1.72 s	2.87 s	4.76 s	28.5 in (0.72 m)	8 ft 8 in (2.64 m)	19 reps
All values from NFL Combine

He later worked as a financial adviser for Merrill Lynch.
