= Elite 11 =

American high school quarterback competition

- Years active: 1999–present
- Founders: Andy Bark
- Website: Elite11.com

Elite 11 is a quarterback competition for high school quarterbacks. Elite 11 was founded in 1999 by Andy Bark and is run by his company Student Sports.

Rising seniors participate in the contest. The quarterbacks submit videos of themselves playing and there are regional events to choose the finalists. Currently 20 quarterbacks are chosen participate. In the past, from 12 to 24 have been selected to the finals, with 400–500 total quarterbacks participating in regional events.

The Elite 11 finals were held across various sites in Southern California. Since 2013, the Elite 11 has been held at Nike World Headquarters in Beaverton, Oregon in conjunction with the opening. The top 11 or 12 quarterbacks are split into teams from a pool of 162 players of different positions in a flag football tournament and other events, such as who can throw the farthest. The lead coach of the Elite 11 is Trent Dilfer, assisted by Jordan Palmer, George Whitfield Jr., Adam Tafralis, and Charlie Frye.

Notable Elite 11 finals alumni include Andrew Luck, Tua Tagovailoa, Trevor Lawrence, Matthew Stafford, Jameis Winston, Teddy Bridgewater, Matt Leinart, Geno Smith, Mark Sanchez, Tim Tebow, Vince Young, Justin Fields, Troy Smith, and Jayden Daniels. Since 2016, the camp has been covered by NFL Network in a YouTube series.

== History of Elite 11 ==
=== 1999 ===
Name	Colleges attended	NFL draft	NFL teams	Awards
Brock Berlin	Florida; Miami (FL)	Undrafted	Miami Dolphins; Dallas Cowboys; St. Louis Rams; Detroit Lions	1997 ESPN RISE National High School Sophomore Player of the Year; Elite 11 MVP; 1999 USA Today National Offensive High School Player of the Year; 2000 Gatorade National Player of the Year
Matt Cassel	USC	2005 Rd. 7	New England Patriots; Kansas City Chiefs; Minnesota Vikings; Buffalo Bills; Dallas Cowboys; Tennessee Titans; Detroit Lions	2x National Champion (2003, 2004)
Casey Clausen	Tennessee	Undrafted	Kansas City Chiefs	2002 Florida Citrus Bowl MVP
Matt LoVecchio	Notre Dame; Indiana	Undrafted	New York Giants	None
Chance Mock	Texas	Undrafted	None	None
John Rattay	Tennessee; Arizona; Pasadena City	Undrafted	None	None
Chris Rix	Florida State	Undrafted	None	2001 ACC Freshman of the Year
Jeff Smoker	Michigan State	2004 Rd. 6	St. Louis Rams; Philadelphia Eagles; Kansas City Chiefs	2003 All-Big Ten Second Team by coaches and Media
Jon Van Cleave	Louisiana-Lafayette	Undrafted	None	None
Zac Wasserman	Penn State; Los Angeles Valley; California	Undrafted	None	None
Roman Ybarra	UCLA; Palomar; Idaho State	Undrafted	None	None

=== 2000 ===
Name	Colleges attended	NFL draft	NFL teams	Awards/accomplishments
Derek Anderson	Oregon State	2005 Rd. 6	Baltimore Ravens; Cleveland Browns; Arizona Cardinals; Carolina PanthersBuffalo Bills	2004 All-Pac-10 Second Team; 2004 Insight Bowl Offensive MVP; 2008 Pro Bowl Selection
Kellen Clemens	Oregon	2006 Rd. 2	New York Jets; Washington Redskins; Houston Texans; St. Louis Rams; San Diego / Los Angeles Chargers	None
Nic Costa	Arizona; Portland State	Undrafted	None	None
Brodie Croyle	Alabama	2006 Rd. 3	Kansas City Chiefs; Arizona Cardinals	Elite 11 MVP; 2006 Cotton Bowl Classic MVP
Billy Hart	USC	Undrafted	None	None
Matt Leinart	USC	2006 Rd. 1	Arizona Cardinals; Houston Texans; Oakland Raiders; Buffalo Bills	2004 Heisman Trophy; 2004 Walter Camp Award; 2004 Johnny Unitas Golden Arm Award; 2004 Manning Award; 2x College Football Quarterback of the Year (2004, 2005); 2004 Associated Press College Football Player of the Year; 2004 Rose Bowl MVP; 2x National Champion (2003, 2004); 2005 Orange Bowl MVP
Ingle Martin	Florida; Furman	2006 Rd. 5	Green Bay Packers; Tennessee Titans; Kansas City Chiefs; Denver Broncos	None
Adrian McPherson	Florida State	2005 Rd. 5	New Orleans Saints	None
Kyle Orton	Purdue	2005 Rd. 4	Chicago Bears; Denver Broncos; Kansas City Chiefs; Dallas Cowboys; Buffalo Bills	2004 All-Big Ten First Team by Media & Second Team by coaches
Casey Paus	Washington	Undrafted	None	None
D. J. Shockley	Georgia	2006 Rd. 7	Atlanta Falcons	2005 All-SEC First Team by AP & Second Team by coaches
Paul Troth	East Carolina; Liberty	Undrafted	None	None

=== 2001 ===
Name	Colleges attended	NFL draft	NFL teams	Awards/accomplishments
Gavin Dickey	Florida	Undrafted	None	None
Trent Edwards	Stanford	2007 Rd. 3	Buffalo Bills; Jacksonville Jaguars; Oakland Raiders; Philadelphia Eagles; Chicago Bears	None
Matt Gutierrez	Michigan; Idaho State	Undrafted	New England Patriots Kansas City Chiefs; Chicago Bears; Washington Redskins; St. Louis Rams	None
Anthony Martinez	Virginia	Undrafted	None	None
Ryan O'Hara	Arizona; Scottsdale CC; Central Oklahoma	Undrafted	None	None
Ben Olson	BYU; UCLA	Undrafted	None	Elite 11 MVP
Drew Olson	UCLA	Undrafted	Baltimore Ravens; Carolina Panthers; San Francisco 49ers	2005 All-Pac-10 Second Team
Tyler Palko	Pittsburgh	Undrafted	New Orleans Saints; Arizona Cardinals; Pittsburgh Steelers; Kansas City Chiefs	2004 All-Big East Second Team; 2005 All-Big East Second Team
Troy Smith	Ohio State	2007 Rd. 5	Baltimore Ravens; San Francisco 49ers Pittsburgh Steelers	2006 Heisman Trophy; 2006 Associated Press College Football Player of the Year; 2006 College Football Quarterback of the Year; 2006 Walter Camp Award; 2006 Davey O'Brien Award; 2006 Fiesta Bowl MVP
Drew Stanton	Michigan State	2007 Rd. 2	Detroit Lions; New York Jets; Indianapolis Colts; Arizona Cardinals Cleveland Browns Tampa Bay Buccaneers	Super Bowl champion (2020)
Vince Young	Texas	2006 Rd. 1	Tennessee Titans; Philadelphia Eagles; Buffalo Bills; Green Bay Packers; Cleveland Browns	2003 Big 12 Offensive Freshman of the Year; 2005 Maxwell Award; 2005 Manning Award; 2005 Davey O'Brien Award; 2005 National Champion; 2x Rose Bowl MVP (2005, 2006); 2005 Big 12 Offensive Player of the Year; 2006 AP NFL Offensive Rookie of the Year; 2006 Diet Pepsi NFL Rookie of the Year; 2007 Pro Bowl Selection
Justin Zwick	Ohio State	Undrafted	Carolina Panthers	None

=== 2002 ===
Name	Colleges attended	NFL draft	NFL teams	Awards/accomplishments
Mike Affleck	Arizona State; BYU; Dixie State; Utah State	Undrafted	None	None
Dennis Dixon	Oregon	2008 Rd. 5	Pittsburgh Steelers; Baltimore Ravens; Philadelphia Eagles; Buffalo Bills; Arizona Cardinals	2007 Pac-10 Offensive Player of the Year; Super Bowl XLIII Champion
Tommy Grady	Oklahoma; Utah	Undrafted	Miami Dolphins	First-Team All-Arena QB (2012); AFL Offensive Player of the Year (2012); National Guard MVP of the Year (2012); AFL Single Season Record for touchdown passes (142 in 2012); AFL Single Season Record for passing yards (5,863 in 2102); AFL Single Season Record for passing completions (508 in 2012) AFL Single Game Record for touchdown passes (12 in 2012)
Robert Lane	Ole Miss	Undrafted	None	None
Chris Leak	Florida	Undrafted	Chicago Bears	2000 ESPN RISE National High School Sophomore Player of the Year; 2001 ESPN RISE National High School Junior Player of the Year; 2002 Hall Trophy; 2002 USA Today National Offensive High School Player of the Year; 2006 All-SEC Second Team by coaches 2006 National Champion; 2007 BCS National Championship Game MVP
Justin Midgett	Florida; Eastern Illinois	Undrafted	None	None
Blake Mitchell	South Carolina	Undrafted	None	None
T. C. Ostrander	Stanford	Undrafted	New Orleans Saints	None
Clayton Richard	Michigan	Undrafted	None	Pitcher for Chicago White Sox and San Diego Padres
JaMarcus Russell	LSU	2007 Rd. 1	Oakland Raiders	2003 National Champion; 2006 All-SEC First Team by coaches and AP; 2006 Manning Award; 2007 NFL draft Number One Overall Selection
Andre' Woodson	Kentucky	2008 Rd. 6	New York Giants; Washington Redskins	2x Music City Bowl MVP (2006, 2007); 2006 All-SEC Second Team by coaches and AP; 2007 All-SEC Second Team by coaches and AP
Kyle Wright	Miami (FL)	Undrafted	Minnesota Vikings; San Francisco 49ers	Elite 11 MVP; 2003 Gatorade National Player of the Year

=== 2003 ===
Name	Colleges attended	NFL draft	NFL teams	Awards/accomplishments
Rhett Bomar	Oklahoma; Sam Houston State	2009 Rd. 5	New York Giants; Minnesota Vikings; Oakland Raiders	2002 Rivals.com High School Junior of the Year; Elite 11 co-MVP; 2005 Holiday Bowl Offensive MVP
John David Booty	USC	2008 Rd. 5	Minnesota Vikings; Tennessee Titans; Houston Texans	2001 ESPN RISE National High School Sophomore Player of the Year; 2006 All-Pac-10 First Team; 2008 Rose Bowl Offensive MVP; 2x National Champion (2003, 2004)
A.J. Bryant	Georgia	Undrafted	None	None
Kirby Freeman	Miami (FL); Baylor	Undrafted	San Francisco 49ers	2006 MPC Computers Bowl MVP
Brian Hildebrand	Oregon State; Mt. San Antonio; Nebraska; Humboldt State	Undrafted	None	None
Cornelius Ingram	Florida	2009 Rd. 5 (Drafted as TE)	Philadelphia Eagles; Detroit Lions; Denver Broncos	2x National Champion (2006, 2008)
Nate Longshore	California	Undrafted	None	2006 Holiday Bowl Co-Offensive MVP
Anthony Morelli	Penn State	Undrafted	Arizona Cardinals	None
Chase Patton	Missouri	Undrafted	None	None
Bobby Reid	Oklahoma State; Texas Southern	Undrafted	None	None
Matt Tuiasosopo	Washington	Undrafted	None	Elite 11 co-MVP
Drew Weatherford	Florida State	Undrafted	None	None

=== 2004 ===
Name	Colleges attended	NFL draft	NFL teams	Awards/accomplishments
Harrison Beck	Nebraska; NC State; North Alabama	Undrafted	None	None
Jake Christensen	Iowa; Eastern Illinois	Undrafted	None	None
Joe Cox	Georgia	Undrafted	None	None
Jonathan Crompton	Tennessee	2010 Rd. 5	San Diego Chargers; New England Patriots; Tampa Bay Buccaneers; Washington Redskins	None
Chase Daniel	Missouri	Undrafted	Washington Redskins; New Orleans Saints; Kansas City Chiefs; Philadelphia Eagles; Chicago Bears; Detroit Lions Los Angeles Chargers	2007 Heisman Trophy finalist 2007 Big 12 Offensive Player of the Year
Jonathan Garner	Georgia Tech; Marshall	Undrafted	None	None
Arkelon Hall	Washington State; College of the Sequoias; Memphis	Undrafted	None	None
Ryan Perrilloux	LSU; Jacksonville State	Undrafted	New York Giants	2004 Hall Trophy; 2004 USA Today National Offensive High School Player of the Year; 2007 National Champion
Kyle Reed	California; San Jose State	Undrafted	None	None
Mark Sanchez	USC	2009 Rd. 1	New York Jets; Philadelphia Eagles; Denver Broncos; Dallas Cowboys; Chicago BearsWashington Redskins	Elite 11 MVP; 2008 All-Pac-10 First Team; 2009 Rose Bowl Offensive MVP
Rob Schoenhoft	Ohio State; Delaware	Undrafted	None	None
Willie Tuitama	Arizona	Undrafted	None	2008 Las Vegas Bowl MVP

=== 2005 ===
Name	Colleges attended	NFL draft	NFL teams	Awards/accomplishments
Neil Caudle	Auburn	Undrafted	None	2010 National Champion
Pat Devlin	Penn State; Delaware	Undrafted	Miami Dolphins; Minnesota Vikings; Chicago Bears; Cleveland Browns	2010 CAA Offensive Player of the Year; 2010 ECAC All-East Offensive Player of the Year
Zach Frazer	Notre Dame; Connecticut	Undrafted	None	None
Josh Freeman	Kansas State	2009 Rd. 1	Tampa Bay Buccaneers; Minnesota Vikings; New York Giants; Miami Dolphins; Indianapolis Colts	None
Cody Hawkins	Colorado	Undrafted	None	None
Jake Locker	Washington	2011 Rd. 1	Tennessee Titans	2007 Pac-10 Freshman of the Year
Mitch Mustain	Arkansas; USC	Undrafted	None	2005 Hall Trophy; 2005 USA Today National Offensive High School Player of the Year; 2006 Gatorade National Player of the Year
Kevin Riley	California	Undrafted	None	2007 Armed Forces Bowl MVP
Jevan Snead	Texas; Ole Miss	Undrafted	Tampa Bay Buccaneers	None
Matthew Stafford	Georgia	2009 Rd. 1	Detroit Lions; Los Angeles Rams	Elite 11 MVP; 2006 Chick-fil-A Bowl MVP; 2008 All-SEC Second Team by coaches and AP; 2009 Capital One Bowl MVP; 2009 NFL draft first overall pick Super Bowl Champion
Tim Tebow	Florida	2010 Rd. 1	Denver Broncos; New York Jets; New England Patriots; Philadelphia Eagles; Jacksonville Jaguars (TE)	2007 Heisman Trophy; 2007 Associated Press College Football Player of the Year; 2007 College Football Quarterback of the Year; 2x Maxwell Award (2007, 2008); 2007 Davey O'Brien Award; 2007 Sullivan Award; 2008 Manning Award; 2008 Wuerffel Trophy; 2x National Champion (2006, 2008); 2008, 2009 Heisman Trophy finalist 2009 BCS National Championship Game MVP; 2010 Sugar Bowl MVP
Isiah Williams	Illinois	Undrafted	None	2008 All-Big Ten Second Team by Media

=== 2006 ===
Name	Colleges attended	NFL draft	NFL teams	Awards/accomplishments
Rontrell Bailey	Ouachita Baptist; Arkansas–Pine Bluff	Undrafted	None	None
John Brantley	Florida	Undrafted	Baltimore Ravens	Elite 11 MVP; 2007 Gatorade National Player of the Year; 2008 National Champion
Aaron Corp	USC; Richmond	Undrafted	Buffalo Bills; Dallas Cowboys; Miami Dolphins	None
Stephen Garcia	South Carolina	Undrafted	None	None
Logan Gray	Georgia; Colorado	Undrafted	None	None
Willy Korn	Clemson; Marshall; North Greenville	Undrafted	None	None
Peter Lalich	Virginia; Oregon State; California (PA)	Undrafted	None	None
Jarrett Lee	LSU	Undrafted	San Diego Chargers	2007 National Champion
Ryan Mallett	Michigan; Arkansas	2011 Rd. 3	New England Patriots; Houston Texans; Baltimore Ravens	2010 Premier Player of College Football Trophy Winner; 2009 All-SEC Second Team by coaches and AP; 2010 Liberty Bowl MVP; 2010 All-SEC Second Team by coaches and AP
Brock Mansion	California	Undrafted	None	None
Keith Nichol	Oklahoma; Michigan State	Undrafted	None	None
Tyrod Taylor	Virginia Tech	2011 Rd. 6	Baltimore Ravens; Buffalo Bills; Cleveland Browns; Los Angeles Chargers Houston Texans; New York Giants; New York Jets	2010 ACC Football Player of the Year; 2010 ACC Offensive Player of the Year; Super Bowl XLVII Champion

=== 2007 ===
Name	Colleges attended	NFL draft	NFL teams	Awards/accomplishments
Nick Crissman	UCLA	Undrafted	None	None
Dayne Crist	Notre Dame; Kansas	Undrafted	Baltimore Ravens	None
Blaine Gabbert	Missouri	2011 Rd. 1	Jacksonville Jaguars; San Francisco 49ers Arizona CardinalsTennessee Titans Tampa Bay Buccaneers	Elite 11 MVP; Super Bowl champion (2020)
Mike Glennon	NC State	2013 Rd. 3	Tampa Bay Buccaneers; Chicago Bears; Arizona Cardinals; Tennessee Titans Tampa Bay Buccaneers; Jacksonville Jaguars; New York Giants	None
Jacory Harris	Miami (FL)	Undrafted	Philadelphia Eagles	None
Star Jackson	Alabama; Georgia State	Undrafted	None	None
Landry Jones	Oklahoma	2013 Rd. 4	Pittsburgh SteelersJacksonville Jaguars; Oakland Raiders	2010 Sammy Baugh Trophy; 2011 Fiesta Bowl Offensive MVP
Andrew Luck	Stanford	2012 Rd. 1	Indianapolis Colts	2010 Heisman Trophy finalist 2011 Orange Bowl MVP; 2011 Heisman Trophy finalist 2011 Maxwell Award; 2011 Walter Camp Award; 2011 Johnny Unitas Golden Arm Award; 2x Pac-12 Offensive Player of the Year (2010, 2011); 2012 NFL draft first overall pick
EJ Manuel	Florida State	2013 Rd. 1	Buffalo Bills; Oakland Raiders	2010 Gator Bowl MVP; 2012 All-ACC Second Team by coaches and Media
Kyle Parker	Clemson	Undrafted	None	None
Sean Renfree	Duke	2013 Rd. 7	Atlanta Falcons; Tampa Bay Buccaneers	None
John Wienke	Iowa	Undrafted	None	None

=== 2008 ===
Name	Colleges attended	NFL draft	NFL teams	Awards/accomplishments
Tajh Boyd	Clemson	2014 Rd. 6	New York Jets; Pittsburgh Steelers	2011 All-ACC First Team; 2012 ACC Football Player of the Year; 2012 ACC Offensive Player of the Year
Richard Brehaut	UCLA	Undrafted	None	None
Allan Bridgford	California; Southern Miss	Undrafted	None	None
Raymond Cotton	Ole Miss; South Alabama; Mississippi Gulf Coast CC; Belhaven; Mississippi College	Undrafted	None	None
Garrett Gilbert	Texas; SMU	2014 Rd. 6	St. Louis Rams; New England Patriots; Detroit Lions; Oakland Raiders; Carolina Panthers; Cleveland Browns; Dallas Cowboys	2008 USA Today National Offensive High School Player of the Year; 2009 Gatorade National Player of the Year
Andrew Maxwell	Michigan State	Undrafted	None	None
A. J. McCarron	Alabama	2014 Rd. 5	Cincinnati Bengals; Buffalo Bills Oakland Raiders; Houston Texans Atlanta Falcons	2012 BCS National Championship Game Offensive MVP; 2013 Maxwell Award Winner; 2013 Heisman Trophy finalist 2013 Johnny Unitas Golden Arm Award Winner; 2012 All-SEC Second Team by coaches AP 3 time national champion (2009, 2011, 2012)
Zach Mettenberger	Georgia; Butler CC; LSU	2014 Rd. 6	Tennessee Titans; San Diego Chargers; Pittsburgh Steelers	None
Aaron Murray	Georgia	2014 Rd. 5	Kansas City Chiefs; Arizona Cardinals; Philadelphia Eagles; Los Angeles Rams	Elite 11 MVP; 2011 All-SEC Second Team by coaches and AP; 2013 Capital One Bowl MVP; All-time SEC Passing Touchdown Leader; All-time SEC Career Passing Yards Leader
Bryn Renner	North Carolina	Undrafted	Denver Broncos; Baltimore Ravens; Tennessee Titans; San Diego Chargers; Pittsburgh Steelers	None
Tom Savage	Rutgers; Arizona; Pittsburgh	2014 Rd. 4	Houston TexansNew Orleans Saints San Francisco 49ers Cincinnati Bengals Detroit Lions	None
Geno Smith	West Virginia	2013 Rd. 2	New York Jets; New York Giants; Los Angeles Chargers; Seattle Seahawks	2010 All-Big East Conference Second Team; 2011 All-Big East Conference First Team; 2012 Orange Bowl Most Valuable Player; 2012 All-Big 12 Conference Second Team; 2022 NFL Completion Percentage leader 2022 Pro Bowl Selection; 2022 NFL Comeback Player of the Year

=== 2009 ===
Name	Colleges attended	NFL draft	NFL teams	Awards/accomplishments
Blake Bell	Oklahoma	2015 Rd. 4 (Drafted as TE)	San Francisco 49ers Minnesota VikingsJacksonville Jaguars Dallas Cowboys Kansas City Chiefs	2011 Insight Bowl Offensive MVP
Joe Boisture	Michigan State; Saginaw Valley State	Undrafted	None	None
Rob Bolden	Penn State; LSU; Eastern Michigan	Undrafted	None	None
Tyler Bray	Tennessee	Undrafted	Kansas City Chiefs; Chicago Bears	None
Barry Brunetti	West Virginia; Ole Miss	Undrafted	None	None
Devin Gardner	Michigan	Undrafted	New England Patriots; Pittsburgh Steelers	None
Jake Heaps	BYU; Kansas; Miami (FL)	Undrafted	New York Jets; Seattle Seahawks	Elite 11 MVP; 2010 New Mexico Bowl MVP
Austin Hinder	California	Undrafted	None	None
Nick Montana	Washington; Mt. San Antonio; Tulane	Undrafted	None	None
Jesse Scroggins	USC; El Camino; Arizona; Lindenwood	Undrafted	None	None
Phillip Sims	Alabama; Virginia; Winston-Salem State	Undrafted	Arizona Cardinals; Seattle Seahawks	None
Chandler Whitmer	Illinois; Butler CC; Connecticut	Undrafted	None	None

=== 2010 ===
Name	Colleges attended	NFL draft	NFL teams	Awards/accomplishments
Archie Bradley	Oklahoma	Undrafted	None	
Teddy Bridgewater	Louisville	2014 Rd. 1	Minnesota Vikings; New York Jets; New Orleans Saints; Carolina Panthers; Denver Broncos; Miami Dolphins	2011 Big East Rookie of the Year; 2012 Big East Offensive Player of the Year
Evan Crower	Stanford	Undrafted	None	None
Jeff Driskel	Florida; Louisiana Tech	2016 Rd. 6	San Francisco 49ers Cincinnati Bengals; Detroit Lions Denver Broncos Houston Texans	Elite 11 MVP
Phillip Ely	Alabama; Toledo	Undrafted	None	None
Kiehl Frazier	Auburn; Ouachita Baptist	Undrafted	None	None
Everett Golson	Notre Dame; Florida State	Undrafted	None	None
Cody Kessler	USC	2016 Rd. 3	Cleveland Browns; Jacksonville Jaguars Philadelphia Eagles New England Patriots	None
Adam Pittser	Wyoming; Illinois State	Undrafted	None	None
DaMarcus Smith	Western Kentucky; Butler CC; North Texas; Kentucky Wesleyan	Undrafted	None	None
Kendal Thompson	Oklahoma; Utah	Undrafted	Washington Redskins Los Angeles Rams	None
J.W. Walsh	Oklahoma State	Undrafted	None	2012 Big 12 Freshman Offensive Player of the Year

=== 2011 ===
Name	Colleges attended	NFL draft	NFL teams	Awards/accomplishments
Austin Appleby	Purdue; Florida	Undrafted	Dallas Cowboys	None
Neal Burcham	SMU	Undrafted	None	Elite 11 co-MVP
Shane Dillon	Colorado; Cuyamaca; Metro State	Undrafted	None	None
Bart Houston	Wisconsin	Undrafted	Pittsburgh Steelers	None
Chad Kelly	Clemson; East Mississippi CC; Ole Miss	2017 Rd. 7	Denver Broncos; Indianapolis Colts	2014 NJCAA National Champion
Zach Kline	California; Butte; Indiana State; Fresno State	Undrafted	None	None
Jeff Lindquist	Washington	Undrafted	None	None
Tanner Mangum	BYU	Undrafted	None	Elite 11 co-MVP 2015 Touchdown Club of Columbus Freshman of the Year
Zeke Pike	Auburn; Louisville; Murray State	Undrafted	None	None
Chad Voytik	Pittsburgh; Arkansas State	Undrafted	None	None
Jameis Winston	Florida State	2015 Rd. 1	Tampa Bay Buccaneers New Orleans Saints Cleveland Browns New York Giants	Elite 11 co-MVP; 2013 Heisman Trophy; 2013 Davey O'Brien National Quarterback Award; 2013 Walter Camp Football Foundation Award; 2013 Manning Award; 2013 ACC Player of the Year; 2013 ACC Rookie of the Year; 2013 Sporting News Player of the Year; 2013 Consensus All-American; 2013 AP National Player of the Year; 2014 ACC Athlete of the Year; 2014 BCS National Champion; 2014 BCS National Championship Offensive MVP; 2015 NFL draft first overall pick 2015 NFL Pro Bowl

=== 2012 ===
Name	Colleges attended	NFL draft	NFL teams	Awards/accomplishments
Max Browne	USC; Pittsburgh	Undrafted	None	None
Shane Cockerille	Maryland	Undrafted	None	None
Luke Del Rio	Alabama; Oregon State; Florida	Undrafted	None	None
Joshua Dobbs	Tennessee	2017 Rd. 4	Pittsburgh Steelers; Jacksonville Jaguars; Arizona Cardinals	2015 TaxSlayer Bowl MVP
Jared Goff	California	2016 Rd. 1	Los Angeles Rams; Detroit Lions	2017 Pro Bowl; 2018 Pro Bowl; 2015 Armed Forces Bowl (December) MVP; 2022 Pro Bowl
Zack Greenlee	Fresno State; UTEP	Undrafted	None	None
Christian Hackenberg	Penn State	2016 Rd. 2	New York Jets Oakland Raiders Philadelphia Eagles Cincinnati Bengals	2013 Big Ten Thompson–Randle El Freshman of the Year
Kevin Olsen	Miami (FL); Towson; Garden City CC; Riverside City; Charlotte	Undrafted	None	None
Johnny Stanton	Nebraska; Saddleback; UNLV	Undrafted	Minnesota Vikings; Cleveland Browns	None
Asiantii Woulard	UCLA; South Florida; Clarion (PA)	Undrafted	None	Elite 11 MVP
Malik Zaire	Notre Dame; Florida	Undrafted	None	None

=== 2013 ===
Name	Colleges attended	NFL draft	NFL teams	Awards/accomplishments
Kyle Allen	Texas A&M; Houston	Undrafted	Carolina Panthers; Washington Redskins; Houston Texans	2014 Liberty Bowl MVP
Drew Barker	Kentucky	Undrafted	None	None
David Blough	Purdue	Undrafted	Cleveland Browns; Detroit Lions	None
K. J. Carta-Samuels	Washington; Colorado State	Undrafted	None	None
Will Grier	Florida; West Virginia	2019 Rd. 3	Carolina Panthers Dallas Cowboys	Second Team All-Big 12 (2018)
Jerrod Heard	Texas	Undrafted	None	None
Brad Kaaya	Miami (FL)	2017 Rd. 6	Detroit Lions; Carolina Panthers; Indianapolis Colts; Cincinnati Bengals	2014 ACC Freshman of the Year
Jacob Park	Georgia; Trident Tech; Northeastern Oklahoma A&M; Iowa State	Undrafted	None	None
Luke Rubenzer	California	Undrafted	None	None
Deshaun Watson	Clemson	2017 Rd. 1	Houston Texans; Cleveland Browns	2015 Heisman Trophy finalist 2016 Heisman Trophy finalist 2015 Davey O'Brien National Quarterback Award; 2016 Davey O'Brien National Quarterback Award; 2015 Manning Award; 2016 Manning Award; 2015 ACC Player of the Year; 2016 Johnny Unitas Golden Arm Award; CFP national champion (2016); 2017 College Football Playoff National Championship Offensive MVP
Sean White	Auburn	Undrafted	None	Elite 11 MVP; UA All-America game MVP

=== 2014 ===
Name	Colleges attended	NFL draft	NFL teams	Awards/accomplishments
Blake Barnett	Alabama; Palomar; Arizona State; South Florida	Undrafted	None	Elite 11 MVP
Deondre Francois	Florida State; Hampton	Undrafted	None	ACC Rookie of the Year (2016); ACC Offensive Rookie of the Year (2016)
Ben Hicks	SMU; Arkansas	Undrafted	None	SMU's career leader in passing yards (9,081 yards); SMU's career leader in passing touchdowns (71)
Travis Jonsen	Oregon; Riverside City; Montana State	Undrafted	None	None
Drew Lock	Missouri	2019 Rd. 2	Denver Broncos; Seattle Seahawks	SEC single season passing touchdown record (44) (2017); FBS passing touchdowns leader (2017); First-Team All-SEC (2017); Second-Team All-SEC (2018)
Kyler Murray	Texas A&M; Oklahoma	2019 Rd. 1	Arizona Cardinals	Gatorade Football Player of the Year (2014); USA Today Offensive Player of the Year (2014); Heisman Trophy (2018); Davey O'Brien Award (2018); Associated Press Player of the Year (2018); Big 12 Offensive Player of the Year (2018); First-team All-American (2018); First-team All-Big 12 (2018); Number One Overall Selection
Josh Rosen	UCLA	2018 Rd. 1	Arizona Cardinals; Miami Dolphins; Tampa Bay Buccaneers; San Francisco 49ers Atlanta Falcons	Pac-12 Offensive Freshman of the Year (2015); Second-team All-Pac-12 (2017)
Jarrett Stidham	Baylor; McLennan CC; Auburn	2019 Rd. 4	New England Patriots	SEC Newcomer of the Year (2017); First-team All-SEC (2017)
Ricky Town	USC; Arkansas; Ventura; Pittsburgh	Undrafted	None	None
Brady White	Arizona State; Memphis	Undrafted	None	None
Brandon Wimbush	Notre Dame; UCF	Undrafted	None	None

=== 2015 ===
Name	Colleges attended	NFL draft	NFL teams	Awards/accomplishments
Shane Buechele	Texas; SMU	Undrafted	Kansas City Chiefs	First-team All-AAC (2019)
K. J. Costello	Stanford; Mississippi State	Undrafted	Los Angeles Chargers	Second-team All-Pac-12 (2018)
Jacob Eason	Georgia; Washington	2020 Rd. 4	Indianapolis Colts Seattle Seahawks	Gatorade Football Player of the Year (2015); USA Today Offensive Player of the Year (2015) SEC Champion (2017); Rose Bowl Runner Up (2018)
Feleipe Franks	Florida; Arkansas	Undrafted	Atlanta Falcons	2018 Peach Bowl Offensive MVP
Jarrett Guarantano	Tennessee; Washington State	Undrafted	Arizona Cardinals	None
Dwayne Haskins	Ohio State	2019 Rd. 1	Washington Redskins / Football Team; Pittsburgh Steelers	2018 Heisman Trophy finalist 2018 Rose Bowl MVP; First team All-Big Ten (2018); Graham–George Offensive Player of the Year (2018)
Malik Henry	Florida State; Independence CC; Nevada	Undrafted	None	None
Brandon McIlwain	South Carolina; California	Undrafted	None	None
Shea Patterson	Ole Miss; Michigan	Undrafted	Kansas City Chiefs	Elite 11 MVP; Third-team All-Big Ten (2018)
Brandon Peters	Michigan; Illinois	Undrafted	None	Indiana's Mr. Football (2015)
Anthony Russo	Temple; Michigan State	Undrafted	None	None

=== 2016 ===
Name	Colleges attended	NFL draft	NFL teams	Awards/accomplishments
Myles Brennan	LSU	Undrafted	None	2019 SEC Champion; 2020 National Champion
Sean Clifford	Penn State	2023 Rd. 5	Green Bay Packers	None
Tommy DeVito	Syracuse; Illinois	Undrafted	New York Giants	None
Sam Ehlinger	Texas	2021 Rd. 6	Indianapolis Colts	2019 Sugar Bowl MVP; 2019 Alamo Bowl MVP; Second-team All-Big 12 Conference (2020)
Jake Fromm	Georgia	2020 Rd. 5	Buffalo Bills; New York Giants; Washington Commanders	SEC Champion (2017); SEC Freshman Player of the Year (2017); 2018 Rose Bowl winner
Hunter Johnson	Clemson; Northwestern; Clemson	Undrafted	None	2017 US Army All-American Bowl MVP; 2016 Indiana Mr. Football Award
Tate Martell	Ohio State; Miami; UNLV	Undrafted	None	2× USA Today All-American (2014, 2016); Gatorade Football Player of the Year (2016); USA Today Offensive Player of the Year (2016); 2019 Rose Bowl Champion; Cotton Bowl Classic Champion (2017); 2× Big Ten Champion (2017), (2018)
Dylan McCaffrey	Michigan; Northern Colorado	Undrafted	None	None
Davis Mills	Stanford	2021 Rd. 3	Houston Texans	None
Chris Robison	Oklahoma; Florida Atlantic	Undrafted	None	First team All-Conference USA (2019)
Jack Sears	USC; Boise State	Undrafted	None	None
Tua Tagovailoa	Alabama	2020 Rd. 1	Miami Dolphins	Elite 11 MVP; Heisman Trophy runner-up (2018); CFP National Champion (2017); 2018 CFP National Championship Offensive MVP; Maxwell Award (2018); Walter Camp Award (2018); SEC Offensive Player of the Year (2018); First-Team All-SEC (2018); Consensus All-American (2018); 2018 Orange Bowl Offensive MVP; Second Team All-SEC (2019)

=== 2017 ===
Name	Colleges attended	NFL draft	NFL teams	Awards/accomplishments
Gerry Bohanon	Baylor; South Florida; BYU	Undrafted	None	Davey O’Brien Award’s Quarterback Class of 2021
Cammon Cooper	Washington State; Hawaii; Southeastern Louisiana	Undrafted	None	None
Matt Corral	Ole Miss	2022 Rd. 3	Carolina Panthers	2021 Outback Bowl (MVP)
Justin Fields	Georgia; Ohio State	2021 Rd. 1	Chicago Bears; Pittsburgh Steelers	Elite 11 MVP; SEC East Champion (2018); Heisman Trophy – Third Place (2019); Big Ten Offensive Player of the Year (2019); Big Ten Quarterback of the Year (2019); First Team All Big Ten (2019, 2020); Big Ten Champion (2019); Big Ten Championship MVP (2019)
Trevor Lawrence	Clemson	2021 Rd. 1	Jacksonville Jaguars	Hall Trophy (2017); USA Today Offensive Player of the Year (2017); ACC Rookie of the Year (2018); ACC Offensive Rookie of the Year (2018); 2019 CFP National Champion (2019); Second team All-ACC (2018); 2× ACC Champion (2018, 2019); First team All-ACC (2019, 2020); Number One Overall Selection
Devin Leary	NC State; Kentucky	2024 Rd. 6	None	None
Tanner McKee	Stanford	2023 Rd. 6	Philadelphia Eagles	None
Quincy Patterson II	Virginia Tech; North Dakota State; Temple	Undrafted	None	None
Justin Rogers	TCU; UNLV	Undrafted	None	None
Tyler Shough	Oregon; Texas Tech; Louisville	2025 Rd. 2	None	2020 Rose Bowl Champion
Dorian Thompson-Robinson	UCLA	2023 Rd. 5	Cleveland Browns	2x Second-team All-Pac-12 (2020, 2021)
Jack Tuttle	Utah; Indiana; Michigan	Undrafted	None	None
Jarren Williams	Miami (FL); South Florida; Alabama A&M	Undrafted	None	None

=== 2018 ===
Name	Colleges attended	NFL draft	NFL teams	Awards/accomplishments
Zach Calzada	Texas A&M; Auburn; Incarnate Word; Kentucky	Undrafted	None	None
Jayden Daniels	Arizona State; LSU	2024 Rd. 1	Washington Commanders	Heisman Trophy (2023); NFL Rookie of the Year (2024)
Max Duggan	TCU	2023 Rd. 7	Los Angeles Chargers	Davey O'Brien Award (2022); Johnny Unitas Golden Arm Award (2022); Big 12 Offensive Player of the Year (2022); Second-team All-American (2022); First-team All-Big 12 (2022)
Ty Evans	NC State; Texas State	Undrafted	None	None
Grant Gunnell	Arizona; Memphis; North Texas; Sam Houston	Undrafted	None	USA Today All-American (2018)
Ryan Hilinski	South Carolina; Northwestern	Undrafted	None	None
Sam Howell	North Carolina	2022 Rd. 5	Washington Commanders	Second-team All-ACC (2020); Third-team All-ACC (2019); ACC Rookie of the Year (2019); USA Today Freshman All-American (2019); Military Bowl MVP (2019)
D'Wan Mathis	Georgia; Temple; Davenport	Undrafted	None	None
Brian Maurer	Tennessee; Stephen F. Austin	Undrafted	None	None
Cade McNamara	Michigan; Iowa; East Tennessee State	Undrafted	None	Third-team All-Big Ten (2021)
Graham Mertz	Wisconsin; Florida	2025 Rd. 6	Houston Texans	None
Dylan Morris	Washington; James Madison	Undrafted	None	None
Bo Nix	Auburn; Oregon	2024 Rd. 1	Denver Broncos	Alabama Mr. Football (2018); USA Today All-American (2018); SEC Freshman of the Year (2019)
Spencer Rattler	Oklahoma; South Carolina	2024 Rd. 5	New Orleans Saints	Elite 11 MVP; 2x Big 12 Champion (2019, 2020); Big 12 Championship MVP (2020); First-team All-Big 12 (2020)
Taulia Tagovailoa	Alabama; Maryland	Undrafted	None	None
Paul Tyson	Alabama; Arizona State; Clemson	Undrafted	None	2021 CFP National Champion

=== 2019 ===
DJ Uiagalelei was selected to the 2019 Elite 11 finals but he could not participate because of overlapping obligations to his high school team (St. John Bosco High School) so they selected C. J. Stroud instead, who ended up as the 2019 Elite 11 MVP.

Name	Colleges attended	NFL draft	NFL teams	Awards/accomplishments
Harrison Bailey	Tennessee; UNLV; Louisville; Florida	Undrafted	None	None
Carson Beck	Georgia; Miami (FL)	2026 Rd. 3	Arizona Cardinals	None
Hudson Card	Texas; Purdue	Undrafted	None	None
Jacolby Criswell	North Carolina; Arkansas; East Tennessee State	Undrafted	None	2019–20 Arkansas Gatorade Player of the Year
Hunter Dekkers	Iowa State; Iowa Western	Undrafted	New Orleans Saints	2019–20 Iowa Gatorade Player of the Year
Luke Doty	South Carolina	Undrafted	None	South Carolina's Mr. Football (2019)
Tyler Van Dyke	Miami (FL); Wisconsin; SMU	Undrafted	None	None
T. J. Finley	LSU; Auburn; Texas State; Western Kentucky; Georgia State; Incarnate Word	Undrafted	None	None
Ethan Garbers	Washington; UCLA	Undrafted	Carolina Panthers	None
Haynes King	Texas A&M; Georgia Tech	Undrafted	Carolina Panthers	None
Chandler Morris	Oklahoma; TCU; North Texas; Virginia	Undrafted	None	None
Sol-Jay Maiava	BYU; New Mexico	Undrafted	None	None
Drew Pyne	Notre Dame; Arizona State; Missouri; Bowling Green	Undrafted	None	None
Jeff Sims	Georgia Tech; Nebraska; Arizona State	Undrafted	None	None
C. J. Stroud	Ohio State	2023 Rd. 1	Houston Texans	Elite 11 MVP; 2021 Heisman Trophy finalist
Bryce Young	Alabama	2023 Rd. 1	Carolina Panthers	2019–20 California Gatorade Player of the Year; 2021 CFP National Champion; USA Today Offensive Player of the Year (2019); USA Today High School All-American (2019); 2021 Heisman Trophy Winner

=== 2020 ===
Name	Colleges attended	NFL draft	NFL teams	Awards/accomplishments
Tyler Buchner	Notre Dame; Alabama	Undrafted	None	None
Kyron Drones	Baylor; Virginia Tech	Undrafted	Green Bay Packers	None
Tyler Macon	Missouri; Alcorn State	In school	None	None
Drake Maye	North Carolina	2024 Rd. 1	New England Patriots	2022 ACC Player of the Year
J. J. McCarthy	Michigan	2024 Rd. 1	Minnesota Vikings	2023 Heisman Trophy finalist
Kyle McCord	Ohio State; Syracuse	2025 Rd. 6	Philadelphia Eagles	None
Miller Moss	USC; Louisville	Undrafted	Chicago Bears	None
Garrett Nussmeier	LSU	2026 Rd. 7	Kansas City Chiefs	None
Kaidon Salter	Tennessee; Liberty; Colorado	Undrafted	None	None
Ty Thompson	Oregon; Tulane	In school	None	None
Brock Vandagriff	Georgia; Kentucky	Undrafted	None	None
Caleb Williams	Oklahoma; USC	2024 Rd. 1	Chicago Bears	Elite 11 MVP; Second team All-Big 12 (2021); USA Today High School All-American (2019); 2022 Heisman Trophy Winner

=== 2021 ===
Name	Colleges attended	NFL draft	NFL teams	Awards/accomplishments
Drew Allar	Penn State	2026 Rd. 3	Pittsburgh Steelers	None
Devin Brown	Ohio State; California; Weber State	In school	None	None
Nick Evers	Oklahoma; Wisconsin; UConn; Missouri	In school	None	None
Quinn Ewers	Ohio State; Texas	2025 Rd. 7	Miami Dolphins	None
Katin Houser	Michigan State; East Carolina; Illinois	In school	None	None
Walker Howard	LSU; Ole Miss; Louisiana	In school	None	None
Cade Klubnik	Clemson	2026 Rd. 4	New York Jets	Elite 11 MVP; U.S. Army Player of the Year (2021)
Maalik Murphy	Texas; Duke; Oregon State	In school	None	None
Zach Pyron	Georgia Tech; South Alabama	In school	None	None
Luther Richesson	Cincinnati; Middle Tennessee; Central Arkansas	In school	None	None
Ty Simpson	Alabama	2026 Rd. 1	Los Angeles Rams	None
Conner Weigman	Texas A&M; Houston	In school	None	None

=== 2022 ===
* Replaced Nico Iamaleava Source:
Name	Colleges attended	NFL draft	NFL teams	Awards/accomplishments
Jackson Arnold	Oklahoma; Auburn; UNLV	In school	None	Elite 11 MVP
Pierce Clarkson	Louisville; UCLA	In school	None	None
Eli Holstein	Alabama; Pittsburgh; Virginia	In school	None	None
Avery Johnson	Kansas State	In school	None	2022–2023 Kansas Gatorade Player of the Year; All-American Bowl (2023); Under Armour All-America Game (2023); 2023 Pop-Tarts Bowl (MVP); K-State Single Season Passing TD Leader - 25 (2024); K-State All-Time Passing TD Leader - 58*
J. J. Kohl	Iowa State; Appalachian State; FIU	In school	None	None
Kenny Minchey	Notre Dame; Kentucky	In school	None	None
Dante Moore	UCLA; Oregon	In school	None	None
Malachi Nelson	USC; Boise State; UTEP	In school	None	None
Austin Novosad	Oregon; Bowling Green	In school	None	None
Chris Parson	Mississippi State; Austin Peay	In school	None	None
Malachi Singleton	Arkansas; Purdue; Appalachian State	In school	None	None
Jaxon Smolik*	Penn State; Temple	In school	None	None
Christopher Vizzina	Clemson	In school	None	None

=== 2023 ===
Name	Colleges attended	NFL draft	NFL teams	Awards/accomplishments
Elijah Brown	Stanford; Washington	In school	None	None
Jadyn Davis	Michigan; East Tennessee State	In school	None	None
Dylan Raiola	Nebraska; Oregon	In school	None	None
Julian Sayin	Alabama; Ohio State	In school	None	Elite 11 MVP
CJ Carr	Notre Dame	In school	None	None
Daniel Kaelin	Nebraska; Virginia	In school	None	None
Air Noland	Ohio State; South Carolina; Memphis	In school	None	None
Demond Williams Jr.	Washington	In school	None	None
Colin Hurley	LSU	In school	None	None
Trever Jackson	Florida State; Arkansas	In school	None	None
DJ Lagway	Florida; Baylor	In school	None	Gatorade Football Player of the Year (2024)
Luke Kromenhoek	Florida State; Mississippi State; South Florida	In school	None	None
Ethan Grunkemeyer	Penn State; Virginia Tech	In school	None	None
Hauss Hejny	TCU; Oklahoma State; Colorado State	In school	None	None
Ryan Puglisi	Georgia	In school	None	None
Isaac Wilson	Utah; Colorado	In school	None	None
Dante Reno	South Carolina; Yale	In school	None	None
Michael Hawkins Jr.	Oklahoma; West Virginia	In school	None	None
Will Hammond	Texas Tech	In school	None	None
Danny O'Neil	San Diego State; Wisconsin	In school	None	None

=== 2024 ===
Name	Colleges attended	NFL draft	NFL teams	Awards/accomplishments
Bryce Baker	North Carolina, Virginia Tech	In school	None	None
Ty Hawkins	SMU	In school	None	None
Tramell Jones Jr.	Florida	In school	None	None
Deuce Knight	Auburn, Ole Miss	In school	None	None
KJ Lacey	Texas	In school	None	None
TJ Lateef	Nebraska	In school	None	None
Julian Lewis	Colorado	In school	None	None
Husan Longstreet	USC, LSU	In school	None	None
George MacIntyre	Tennessee	In school	None	None
Alex Manske	Iowa State	In school	None	None
Ryan Montgomery	Georgia	In school	None	None
Luke Nickel	Miami (FL)	In school	None	None
Keelon Russell	Alabama	In school	None	Elite 11 MVP; Gatorade Football Player of the Year (2025)
Jaron-Keawe Sagapolutele	California	In school	None	None
Akili Smith Jr.	Oregon	In school	None	None
Kevin Sperry	Florida State	In school	None	None
Tavien St. Clair	Ohio State	In school	None	None
Kamario Taylor	Mississippi State	In school	None	None
Malik Washington	Maryland	In school	None	None
Matt Zollers	Missouri	In school	None	None

=== 2025 ===
Name	College committed	NFL draft	NFL teams	Awards/accomplishments
Bryson Beaver	Oregon	In school	None	None
Dia Bell	Texas	In school	None	Elite 11 MVP
Bowe Bentley	Oklahoma	In school	None	None
Faizon Brandon	Tennessee	In school	None	None
Travis Burgess	North Carolina	In school	None	None
Helaman Casuga	Texas A&M	In school	None	Polynesian High School Football Player of the Year (2025)
Briggs Cherry	Louisville	In school	None	None
Dereon Coleman	Miami (FL)	In school	None	None
Landon Duckworth	South Carolina	None	None	
Jake Fette	Arizona State	In school	None	None
Will Griffin	Florida	In school	None	Gatorade Florida Football Player of the Year (2025)
Keisean Henderson	Houston	In school	None	None
Troy Huhn	Virginia Tech	In school	None	None
Matt Ponatoski	Kentucky	None	None	
Tait Reynolds	Clemson	In school	None	None
Oscar Rios	Arizona	In school	None	None
Jett Thomalla	Alabama	In school	None	None
Terry Walker III	Duke	In school	None	None
Jonas Williams	USC	In school	None	None
Derek Zammit	Washington	In school	None	None

=== 2026 ===
Name	College committed	NFL draft	NFL teams	Awards/accomplishments
Israel Abrams	Miami (FL)	In school	None	None
Peter Bourque	Virginia Tech	In school	None	None
Kavian Bryant	Texas Tech	In school	None	None
Keegan Croucher	Ole Miss	In school	None	None
Davin Davidson	Florida	In school	None	None
Brady Edmunds	Ohio State	In school	None	None
Elijah Haven	Alabama	In school	None	None
Peyton Houston	LSU	In school	None	None
Kharim Hughley	Clemson	In school	None	None
Ty Knutson	Texas	In school	None	None
Kamden Lopati	Michigan	In school	None	None
Will Mencl	Oregon	In school	None	None
Jake Nawrot	Kentucky	In school	None	None
Colton Nussmeier	Georgia	In school	None	None
Jameson Purcell	Indiana	In school	None	None
Ryan Rakowski	Nevada	In school	None	None
Trent Seaborn	Alabama	In school	None	None
Trae Taylor III	Nebraska	In school	None	Elite 11 MVP
Braylen Warren	Missouri	In school	None	None
Dane Weber	California	In school	None	None
