= Kingsley Suamataia =

American football player (born 2003)

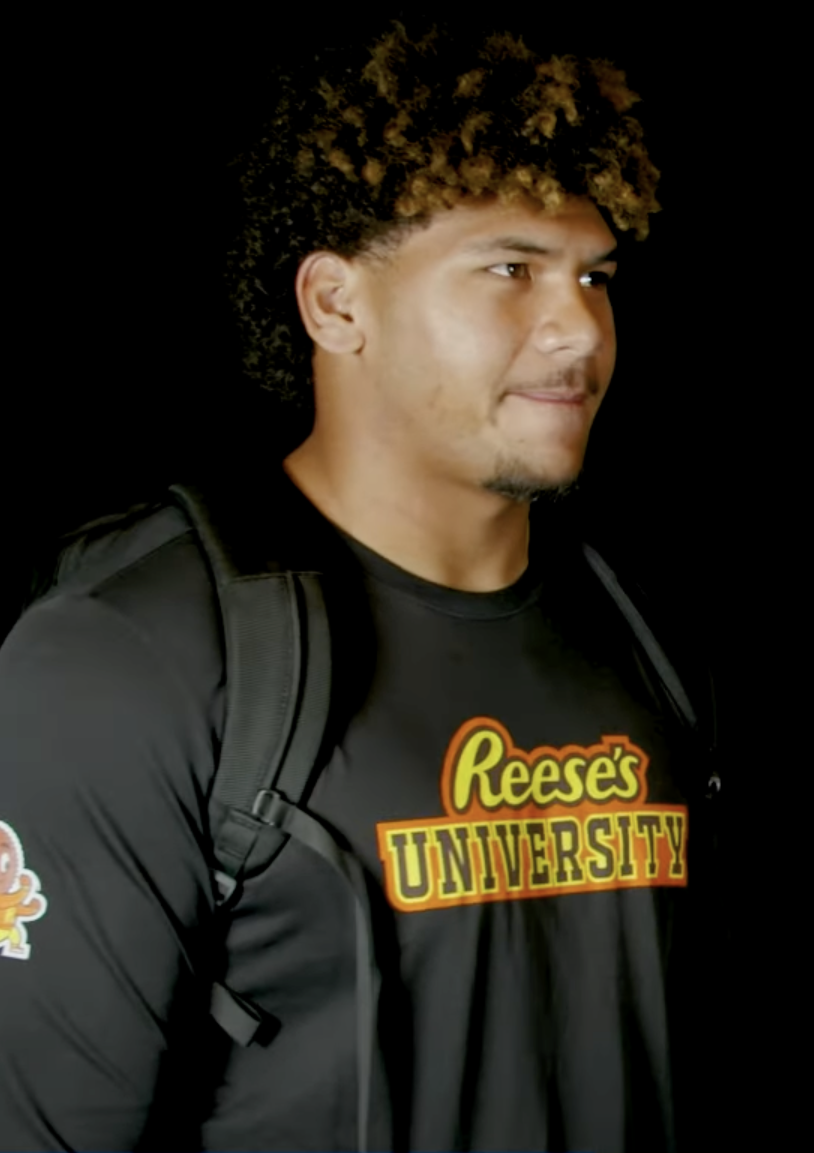
- Suamataia in 2024

No. 76 – Kansas City Chiefs
- Position: Guard
- Roster status: Active

Personal information
- Born: January 18, 2003 (age 23); Orem, Utah, U.S.
- Listed height: 6 ft 4 in (1.93 m)
- Listed weight: 326 lb (148 kg)

Career information
- High school: Orem
- College: Oregon (2021); BYU (2022–2023)
- NFL draft: 2024: 2nd round, 63rd overall pick

Career history
- Kansas City Chiefs (2024–present)

Awards and highlights
- Second-team All-Big 12 (2023)

Career NFL statistics as of 2025
- Games played: 32
- Games started: 19
- Stats at Pro Football Reference

Kingsley Suamataia (/suwəˌmɑːtəˈiːjə/ soo-wə-MAH-tə-EE-yə; born January 18, 2003) is an American professional football offensive guard for the Kansas City Chiefs of the National Football League (NFL). He played college football for the Oregon Ducks and BYU Cougars.

== Early life ==
Suamataia was born on January 18, 2003, in Orem, Utah. He is of Samoan and Hawaiian descent. He lived in his mother's hometown of Laie, Hawaii for part of his childhood, before moving back to Utah and attending Orem High School. A five-star recruit, he received offers from programs such as Alabama, Florida, Georgia, LSU, Miami, Michigan, Notre Dame, Oregon, Ohio State, Oklahoma, Utah and USC. He ultimately committed to play college football for the Oregon Ducks.

== College career ==
During Suamataia's first year at Oregon in 2021, he was redshirted and only played in one game. After the 2021 season on October 26, Suamataia entered the transfer portal, reportedly. On November 5, 2021, Suamataia decided to transfer to Brigham Young University. During the 2022 season, Suamataia played in 12 games starting in all of them, and he did not allow a sack on the season. He was also named to the Freshman All-America Second Team by the Athletic and by College Sports News, additionally he was named All-Independent First Team Offense by College Football Network.

== Professional career ==
Pre-draft measurables
Height	Weight	Arm length	Hand span	Wingspan	40-yard dash	10-yard split	20-yard split	Vertical jump	Broad jump	Bench press
6 ft 4 5/8 in (1.95 m)	326 lb (148 kg)	34 1/4 in (0.87 m)	10 5/8 in (0.27 m)	6 ft 10 1/8 in (2.09 m)	5.04 s	1.74 s	2.90 s	28.0 in (0.71 m)	9 ft 2 in (2.79 m)	31 reps
All values from NFL Combine

Suamataia was drafted by the Kansas City Chiefs in the second round, 63rd overall, of the 2024 NFL draft. He started the first two games of the season at left tackle before being benched in favor of Wanya Morris. Following the 2024 season, he transitioned to the left guard position.

== Personal life ==
As of May 2024, he was engaged to Lealani Falatea, a standout women's basketball player at Brigham Young University.

Suamataia has multiple cousins who have played in the National Football League. Active relatives include Penei Sewell (Detroit Lions); Noah Sewell (Chicago Bears); Nephi Sewell (New Orleans Saints), and Puka Nacua (Los Angeles Rams).

His uncle, C. J. Ah You, played in the NFL from 2007 to 2012 and as of 2024 was linebackers coach at Texas Tech. Another uncle, Richard Brown, played in the NFL for eight years from 1987 to 1996, and a third uncle, Isaac Sopoaga, played in the NFL for nine years from 2004 to 2013. His grandfather, Junior Ah You, is a member of the Canadian Football Hall of Fame.

Suamataia is a member of the Church of Jesus Christ of Latter-day Saints.
