= Polynesian Football Player of the Year Award =

American football award

- Awarded for: Given to the outstanding Polynesian football player at the high school, college and professional levels of football that epitomize great ability and integrity.
- Presented by: Polynesian Football Hall of Fame

History
- First award: 2014
- Most recent: Pro: Los Angeles Rams wide receiver Puka Nacua; College: Utah offensive tackle Spencer Fano and USC wide receiver Makai Lemon; High school: Corner Canyon quarterback Helaman Casuga
- Website: https://www.polynesianfootballhof.org

The Polynesian Football Player of the Year Award is given annually by the Polynesian Football Hall of Fame to the most outstanding player of Polynesian descent at the high school, college, and professional levels of American football. The award was first established in 2014 and initially only recognized the best Polynesian college football player. The award was expanded in 2015 to recognize Polynesian professional football players and was expanded yet again in 2017 to recognize Polynesian high school football players.

== Recipients ==
=== Professional ===
List of Polynesian pro football Player of the Year winners
Year	Player	Position	Team	Ref
2015	Mike Iupati	Guard	Arizona Cardinals	
2016	Marcus Mariota	Quarterback	Tennessee Titans	
2017	JuJu Smith-Schuster	Wide receiver	Pittsburgh Steelers	
2018	JuJu Smith-Schuster (2)	Wide receiver	Pittsburgh Steelers	
2019	Ronnie Stanley	Offensive tackle	Baltimore Ravens	
2020	DeForest Buckner	Defensive tackle	Indianapolis Colts	
2021	No award given			
2022	Tua Tagovailoa (offense)	Quarterback	Miami Dolphins	
2022	Talanoa Hufanga (defense)	Safety	San Francisco 49ers	
2023	Tua Tagovailoa (2)	Quarterback	Miami Dolphins	
2024	Penei Sewell	Offensive tackle	Detroit Lions	
2025	Puka Nacua	Wide receiver	Los Angeles Rams	

=== College ===
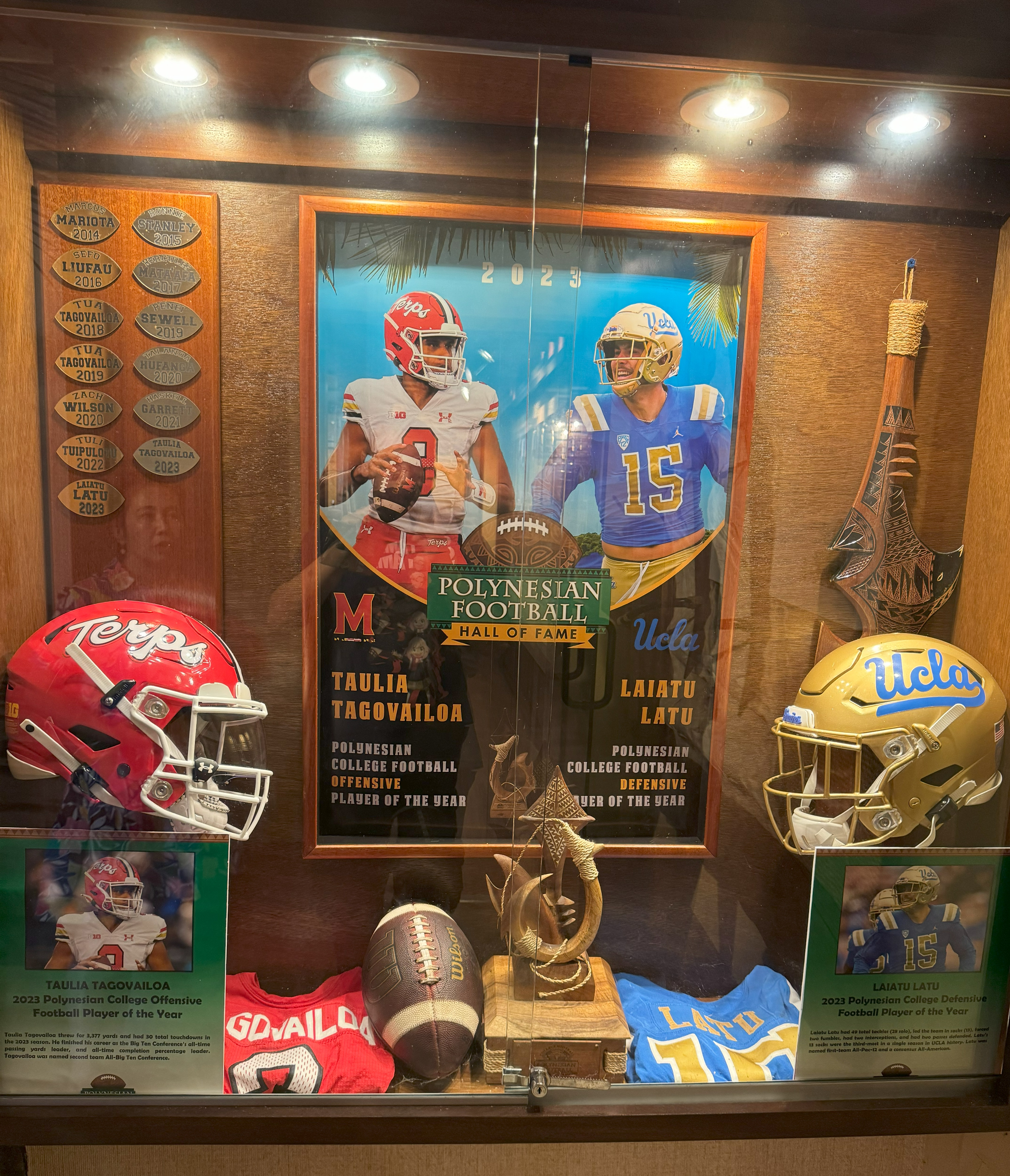
Polynesian Football Hall of Fame display for 2023 college football co-recipients Taulia Tagovailoa and Laiatu Latu

List of Polynesian College Football Player of the Year winners
Year	Player	Position	School	Ref
2014	Marcus Mariota	Quarterback	Oregon	
2015	Ronnie Stanley	Offensive tackle	Notre Dame	
2016	Sefo Liufau	Quarterback	Colorado	
2017	Hercules Mata'afa	Defensive tackle	Washington State	
2018	Tua Tagovailoa	Quarterback	Alabama	
2019	Penei Sewell	Offensive tackle	Oregon	
2019	Tua Tagovailoa (2)	Quarterback	Alabama	
2020	Talanoa Hufanga	Safety	USC	
2020	Zach Wilson	Quarterback	BYU	
2021	Haskell Garrett	Defensive tackle	Ohio State	
2022	Tuli Tuipulotu	Defensive end	USC	
2023	Laiatu Latu (defense)	Defensive end	UCLA	
2023	Taulia Tagovailoa (offense)	Quarterback	Maryland	
2024	Tetairoa McMillan	Wide receiver	Arizona	
2025	Spencer Fano	Offensive tackle	Utah	
2025	Makai Lemon	Wide receiver	USC	

=== High school ===
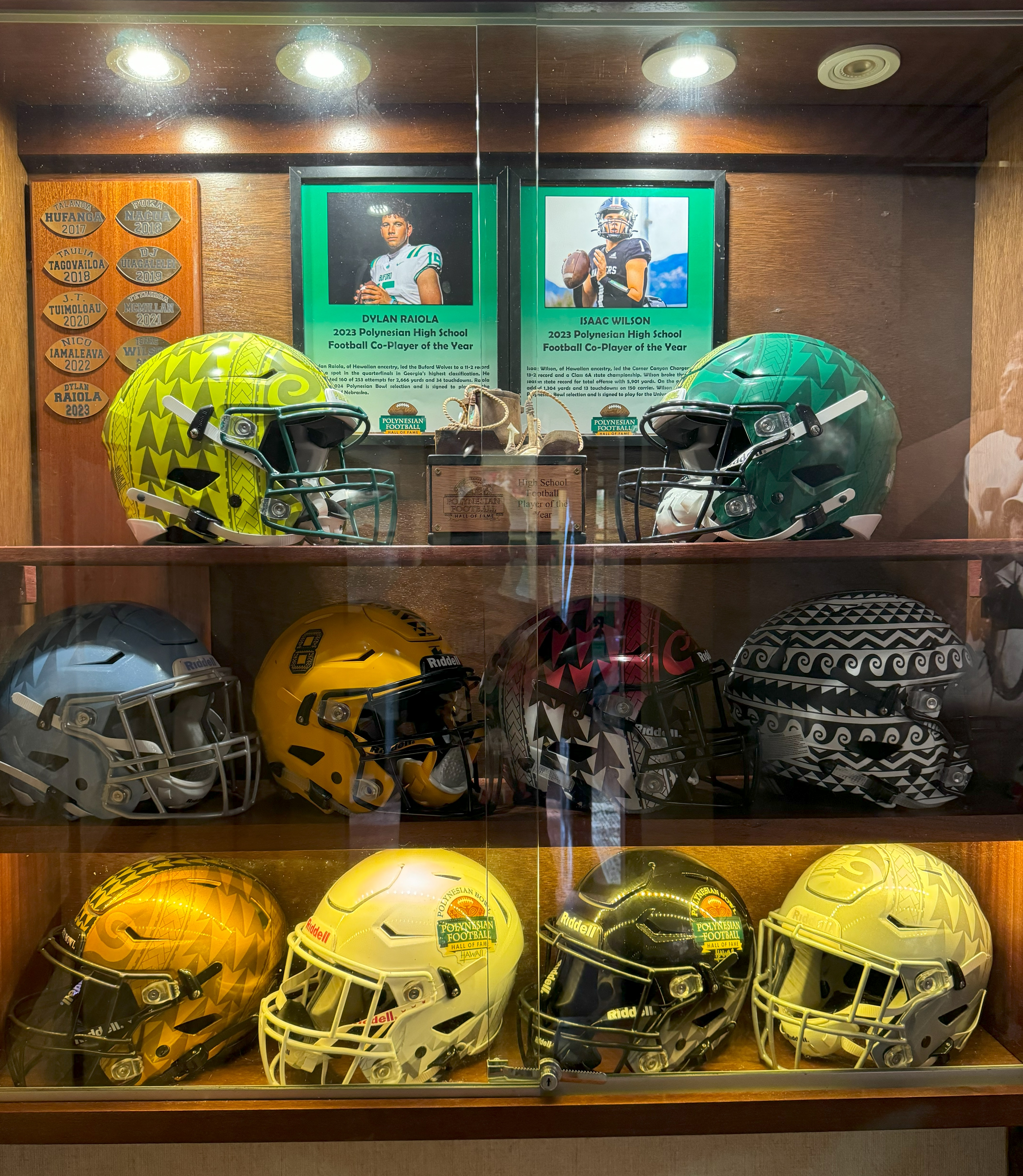
Display at the Polynesian Football Hall of Fame for 2023 high school award winners Dylan Raiola and Isaac Wilson

List of Polynesian High School Football Player of the Year winners
Year	Player	Position	School	Ref
2017	Talanoa Hufanga	Safety	Crescent Valley (Oregon)	
2018	Puka Nacua	Wide receiver	Orem (Utah)	
2018	Taulia Tagovailoa	Quarterback	Thompson (Alabama)	
2019	DJ Uiagalelei	Quarterback	St. John Bosco (California)	
2020	JT Tuimoloau	Defensive end	Eastside Catholic (Washington)	
2021	Tetairoa McMillan	Wide receiver	Servite (California)	
2022	Nico Iamaleava	Quarterback	Warren (California)	
2023	Dylan Raiola	Quarterback	Buford (Georgia)	
2023	Isaac Wilson	Quarterback	Corner Canyon (Utah)	
2024	Iose Epenesa	Defensive end	Edwardsville (Illinois)	
2024	Jaron-Keawe Sagapolutele	Quarterback	James Campbell (Hawaii)	
2025	Helaman Casuga	Quarterback	Corner Canyon (Utah)	
