= 2027 college football recruiting class =

Recruiting of students for US college football

The college football recruiting class of 2027 refers to high school athletes recruited to play college football in the fall of 2027. The scope of this article covers: (a) the colleges and universities with recruiting classes ranking among the top 25 in the country as assessed by at least one of the major media outlets, and (b) the individual recruits ranking among the top 20 in the country as assessed by at least one of the major media outlets: 247Sports, ESPN, On3 and Rivals.

== Top ranked classes ==
Each of the schools listed below were ranked within the top 25 recruiting classes by at least one major recruiting site. They are listed in order of their highest ranking by any of the major media outlets. Rankings may change, and the rankings reflected below are current as of October 20, 2026.

| School | 247 | Rivals/On3 |
|---|---|---|
| Texas A&M | 1 | 1 |
| Notre Dame | 2 | 2 |
| Miami | 4 | 3 |
| Oregon | 3 | 4 |
| Florida | 6 | 5 |
| Oklahoma | 5 | 7 |
| Ohio State | 7 | 6 |
| Texas Tech | 8 | 8 |
| Texas | 9 | 9 |
| Auburn | 10 | 12 |
| LSU | 15 | 10 |
| Michigan | 12 | 11 |
| Georgia | 11 | 15 |
| Ole Miss | 13 | 13 |
| Clemson | 14 | 16 |
| USC | 18 | 14 |
| Nebraska | 16 | 18 |
| UCLA | 17 | 17 |
| Virginia Tech | 19 | 19 |
| Kentucky | 20 | 21 |
| Washington | 21 | 20 |
| Penn State | 23 | 22 |
| Tennessee | 22 | 27 |
| South Carolina | 26 | 23 |
| California | 24 | 25 |
| Georgia Tech | 25 | 24 |

== Top ranked recruits ==
The following individuals were ranked by at least one of the major media outlets among the top 20 players in the country in the class of 2026. They are listed in order of their highest ranking by any of the major media outlets. Rankings may change, and the rankings reflected below are current as of October 20, 2026.

| Player | Position | School | ESPN | 247Sports | Rivals/On3 |
|---|---|---|---|---|---|
| Jalen Brewster | DT | Texas Tech | 1 | 4 | 1 |
| DJ Jacobs | DE | Ohio State | 2 | 1 | 12 |
| Maxwell Hiller | OT | Florida | 3 | 2 | 6 |
| Mark Matthews | OT | Texas A&M | 11 | 3 | 2 |
| Donte Wright | CB | Miami | NR | 6 | 4 |
| Kennedy Brown | OT | Texas A&M | 4 | NR | NR |
| Joshua Dobson | CB | South Carolina | 6 | NR | 5 |
| Elijah Haven | QB | Alabama | 5 | 9 | NR |
| KJ Green | DE | LSU | NR | 5 | NR |
| Kemon Spell | RB | Georgia | 7 | 10 | 10 |
| Monshun Sales | WR | Indiana | 17 | 12 | 7 |
| Trae Taylor | QB | Nebraska | NR | 7 | 16 |
| Easton Royal | WR | Florida | 8 | 14 | 3 |
| Israel Abrams | QB | Miami | NR | 8 | NR |
| David Folorunsho | DT | Notre Dame | NR | NR | 8 |
| Albert Simien | G | Notre Dame | NR | NR | 9 |
| Anthony Sweeney | DE | Texas Tech | 9 | NR | NR |
| Jamier Brown | WR | Ohio State | 10 | NR | NR |
| David Gabriel Georges | RB | Tennessee | 13 | 11 | NR |
| Cooper Hackett | OT | Oklahoma | NR | NR | 11 |
| Marcus Fakatou | DT | Ohio State | 12 | NR | NR |
| Ismael Camara | OT | Texas | NR | 13 | NR |
| Will Mencl | QB | Oregon | NR | NR | 13 |
| Seneca Driver | TE | Oklahoma | NR | NR | 14 |
| Caden Moss | OT | Ohio State | 14 | NR | NR |
| Gabriel Osborne Jr. | CB | Oklahoma | NR | 15 | 20 |
| Abraham Sesay | DE | Notre Dame | NR | NR | 15 |
| Hayden Stepp | CB | Oregon | 15 | NR | NR |
| Oluwasemilore Olubobola | OT | Notre Dame | NR | 16 | 19 |
| Eric McFarland III | WR | Texas A&M | 16 | NR | NR |
| Mekai Brown | DE | USC | NR | NR | 17 |
| Nick Lennear | WR | Miami | NR | 17 | NR |
| Kamarui Dorsey | S | Texas A&M | NR | NR | 18 |
| Raylaun Henry | CB | Texas A&M | 18 | NR | NR |
| Ahmad Hudson | TE | LSU | NR | 18 | NR |
| Jaiden Bryant | DE | Miami | NR | 19 | NR |
| Xavier Sabb | WR | Oregon | 19 | NR | NR |
| Honor Fa'alave-Johnson | S | USC | 20 | NR | NR |
| A'mir Sears | ATH | Miami | NR | 20 | NR |

NR= Not ranked inside top 20
