= Trae Taylor =

American football player

Profile
- Position: Quarterback

Personal information
- Listed height: 6 ft 3 in (1.91 m)
- Listed weight: 192 lb (87 kg)

Career information
- High school: Millard South (Omaha, Nebraska)

“Trae” Taylor III is an American football quarterback. He is committed to play college football for the Nebraska Cornhuskers.

== Early life ==
Taylor attended Carmel Catholic High School in Mundelein, Illinois for three years before transferred to Millard South High School in Omaha, Nebraska for his senior year. In his first year as a starter at Carmel his sophomore year in 2024, he passed for 3,061 yards with 20 touchdowns and rushed for 342 yards with four touchdowns. As a junior in 2025, Taylor completed 205 of 251 passes for 3,571 yards and 38 touchdowns with 633 rushing yards and 12 touchdowns. During Summer in 2026, he competed in the Elite 11, where he was named the MVP.

A five-star recruit, Taylor is ranked as the best quarterback in his class by 247Sports. He committed to the University of Nebraska–Lincoln to play college football.
