= Joshua Dobson =

Hough Huskies
- Position: Cornerback

Personal information
- Listed height: 6 ft 1 in (1.85 m)
- Listed weight: 185 lb (84 kg)

Career information
- High school: William A. Hough (Cornelius, North Carolina)

Joshua Dobson is an American football cornerback at William A. Hough High School in North Carolina. He is a five-star recruit and one of the top prospects in the class of 2027.

== Early life ==
Dobson grew up playing football and first attended Catawba Ridge High School in Fort Mill, South Carolina, where he received his first scholarship offers to play college football as a freshman. A cornerback, he tallied 24 tackles, six pass breakups and three interceptions as a freshman in 2023, then had 48 tackles, 10 pass breakups and three interceptions as a sophomore in 2024. In 2025, Dobson helped Catawba Ridge to a record of 6–6 with an appearance in the state playoffs. In 2026, he competed at the Under Armour All-America Game and recorded an interception. Dobson transferred to William A. Hough High School in Cornelius, North Carolina, for his senior year. He has also competed in track and field in high school.

Dobson is a five-star recruit and one of the top prospects in the class of 2027, being ranked among the top-10 nationally by several publications. He is considered the number one cornerback in his class by ESPN. Dobson committed to play college football for the South Carolina Gamecocks.
