= DJ Jacobs =

American football defensive end

No. 15 - Blessed Trinity Titans
- Position: Defensive end

Personal information
- Listed height: 6 ft 5 in (1.96 m)
- Listed weight: 240 lb (109 kg)

Career information
- High school: Blessed Trinity (Roswell, Georgia)

David Jacobs Jr. is an American football defensive end at Blessed Trinity Catholic High School in Roswell, Georgia. He is a five-star recruit and one of the top prospects in the class of 2027.

== Early life ==
Jacobs is from Roswell, Georgia. His father, David, played college football for the Georgia Bulldogs as a defensive tackle, and his brother, Dawson, is a recruit in the class of 2028. Mark Richt, who coached the Bulldogs, is his godfather. Jacobs attended Blessed Trinity Catholic High School, where his father is a coach, and became a top defensive end, being named the state's outstanding freshman of the year in 2023 after recording 81 tackles, 14 tackles-for-loss (TFLs) and six sacks. He was also a MaxPreps Freshman All-American, honorable mention all-state and the Region 7-AAAAAA Rookie of the Year.

The following year, Jacobs was the Atlanta Journal-Constitution Class AAAA Defensive Player of the Year, first-team all-state and a MaxPreps Sophomore All-American after posting 112 tackles, 35 TFLs and 12 sacks. In 2025, he tallied 102 tackles, 16 sacks and two forced fumbles. He was first-team all-state and a Junior All-American. Jacobs participated at the Polynesian Bowl and the Under Armour All-America Game in 2026. Entering his senior year, he was named to the Journal-Constitution's "Super 11" team, the first player from Blessed Trinity to receive the honor.

A five-star recruit, Jacobs is a consensus top-five prospect nationally in the class of 2027 and the number one ranked edge rusher. He is ranked by 247Sports as the number one recruit in the nation. In December 2025, he committed to play college football for the Ohio State Buckeyes.
