= Malaeimi, American Samoa =

Village in American Samoa

Malaeimi
- Village
- Location within American Samoa
- Coordinates: 14.3174°S 170.7408°W
- Country: United States
- Territory: American Samoa
- County: Tuālāuta

Population (2020)
  - Total: 1,046
- Time zone: UTC−11 (Samoa Time Zone)
- ZIP code: 96799
- Area code: +1 684
- GNIS feature ID: 1669451

Malaeimi is a village in American Samoa, located in Tuālāuta County. The village is home to a large number of shops and restaurants, including eateries serving native cuisine alongside Filipino, Italian, Vietnamese, and American.

== History ==
Malaeimi Valley contains an archaeological site designated AS-31-34, where Samoan ceramic potsherds have been discovered.

In late 1942, the Malaeimi Valley served as a site for jungle training exercises conducted by the United States Marine Corps. The U.S. military established facilities in Malaeimi Valley during World War II, including a state-of-the-art jungle warfare training center and a communications filter center. The installation featured a rifle range, the main filter center building, three officers' quarters with an associated latrine, three enlisted men's quarters with their own latrine, a mess hall, a movie projector, and a designated garbage platform. In late 1942, U.S. Marines began jungle training operations in Malaeimi Valley, but the program was halted due to high incidences of mosquito-borne illnesses. Consequently, between October 1942 and June 1943, the military evacuated 1,265 infected servicemen from Tutuila.

On October 9, 1987, the case Corporation of the Presiding Bishop of the Church of Jesus Christ of Latter-Day Saints v. Hodel was ruled to have invalidated the sale of land in Malaeimi to the Church of Jesus Christ of Latter-day Saints, affirming the constitutional validity of restrictions limiting the ownership of native land in American Samoa to individuals of Samoan ancestry. The decision held that these restrictions did not contravene the Equal Protection Clause of the United States Constitution.

Population
Year	Population
2020	1,046
2010	1,182
2000	1,067
1990	830
1980	717

== Notable people ==
- Nephi Sewell, American football player
- Noah Sewell, American football player
- Penei Sewell, American football player
