= Monshun Sales =

American high school football player

Lawrence North Wildcats
- Position: Wide receiver

Personal information
- Listed height: 6 ft 5 in (1.96 m)
- Listed weight: 195 lb (88 kg)

Career information
- High school: Lawrence North (Indianapolis, Indiana)

Monshun Sales is an American football wide receiver at Lawrence North High School in Indianapolis, Indiana. He is a five-star recruit and one of the top prospects in the class of 2027.

== Early life ==
Sales spent his early years in Birmingham, Alabama, before relocating to Indianapolis, Indiana, in 2021. He grew up playing football and enrolled at Lawrence North High School in Indianapolis, where he joined the football and track teams. As a sophomore with the football team, Sales caught 34 passes for 568 yards and seven touchdowns. He also qualified for the state track championships in the 100 metres, 200 metres and the long jump, winning a silver medal in the 200 metres. Sales also was part of a 4 × 100 metres relay team that won the state title.

As a junior in 2025, Sales tallied 37 receptions for 794 yards and nine touchdowns on offense along with 56 tackles while appearing at safety on defense. He was invited to the 2026 Navy All-American Bowl.

Sales is a consensus five-star prospect and the number one wide receiver recruit in the class of 2027 according to 247Sports. He is also ranked among the top 10 overall prospects in the nation by 247Sports and Rivals.com. He committed to play college football for the Indiana Hoosiers in July 2026, becoming the highest-ranked recruit in program history.
