= Travis Burgess =

American football player

North Carolina Tar Heels
- Position: Quarterback

Personal information
- Listed height: 6 ft 4 in (1.93 m)
- Listed weight: 193 lb (88 kg)

Career information
- High school: Grayson (Loganville, Georgia)

Travis Burgess is an American college football quarterback for the North Carolina Tar Heels.

== Early life ==
Burgess attended Grayson High School in Loganville, Georgia. He became the starting quarterback his junior year, leading to the team to the Georgia 6A State Championship and passing for 2,225 yards with 23 touchdowns, 596 rushing yards and four touchdowns. During the second game of his senior season, Burgess suffered a season-ending injury.

A four-star recruit, Burgess was ranked among the best quarterbacks in his class and was selected to play in the Elite 11 Finals. He committed to the University of North Carolina at Chapel Hill to play college football.
