= Maxwell Hiller =

American football player

Coatesville Red Raiders
- Position: Offensive tackle

Personal information
- Listed height: 6 ft 5 in (1.96 m)
- Listed weight: 300 lb (136 kg)

Career information
- High school: Coatesville Area (Caln Township, Pennsylvania)

Maxwell Hiller is an American football offensive tackle at Coatesville Area High School in Pennsylvania. He is a five-star recruit and one of the top prospects in the class of 2027.

== Early life ==
Hiller is from Coatesville, Pennsylvania. His brother, Colton, is a five-star basketball recruit in the class of 2028. His father played college soccer and his mother played college field hockey. Hiller grew up playing both football and basketball and plays as an offensive lineman in football at Coatesville Area High School. He had received scholarship offers to play college football while still in eighth grade, before he had even played high school football.

As a sophomore at Coatesville in 2024, Hiller served as the team's starting right tackle and was a MaxPreps Sophomore All-American. In 2025, as a junior, he was a member of a Coatesville team that went 10–3 and was named an Under Armour All-American.

Hiller is a consensus five-star recruit in the class of 2027. He is ranked among the top-three prospects nationally by 247Sports, ESPN and Rivals.com, and is the top-ranked offensive line recruit. He committed to play college football for the Florida Gators.
