= Easton Royal (American football) =

American football player (born 2009)

Profile
- Position: Wide receiver

Personal information
- Born: July 29, 2009 (age 17)
- Listed height: 5 ft 11 in (1.80 m)
- Listed weight: 214 lb (97 kg)

Career information
- High school: Brother Martin (New Orleans, Louisiana, U.S.)

Easton Royal (born July 29, 2009) is an American football wide receiver. He is committed to play college football for the Texas Longhorns. On October 11, 2026, Royal flipped his commitment to the Florida Gators.

== Early life ==
Royal attends Brother Martin High School in New Orleans, Louisiana. As a sophomore in 2025, he had 53 receptions for 1,551 yards with 17 receiving touchdowns, four rushing touchdowns, three return touchdowns, and one touchdown pass on a trick play. Royal also runs track and field in high school. In 2026, he broke a 46-year Louisiana state record with a 10.17 in the 100-meter dash.

A five-star recruit, Royal is rated as one of the best wide receivers in the class of 2027. In November 2025, he committed to the University of Texas at Austin to play college football. However, on October 11, 2026, Royal flipped his commitment to the Florida Gators
