= Will Mencl =

Chandler Wolves
- Position: Quarterback

Personal information
- Listed height: 6 ft 3 in (1.91 m)
- Listed weight: 205 lb (93 kg)

Career information
- High school: Saguaro (Scottsdale, Arizona); Chandler (Chandler, Arizona)

Will Mencl is an American football quarterback at Chandler High School in Arizona. He is a five-star recruit and one of the top prospects in the class of 2027.

== Early life ==
Growing up, Mencl lived in Texas, South Florida, and Illinois, before moving to Arizona while in eighth grade. He played several sports, including football, basketball, baseball, and lacrosse. He initially attended Saguaro High School in Scottsdale, Arizona, where he became a starter after injuries to other players, but himself had a season-ending injury in his first game. Mencl transferred to Chandler High School after the season. In 2024, as a sophomore at Chandler, he threw for 1,058 yards and 11 touchdowns in eight games while completing 71% of his passes.

The following year, Mencl quarterbacked Chandler to a record of 10–3, throwing for 3,801 yards and 33 touchdowns while also running for 718 yards and 17 touchdowns. For his performance, he was named a finalist for USA Today's ALL-USA Team and was invited to the All-American Bowl.

Mencl is a five-star recruit and one of the top quarterback prospects in the class of 2027. He is ranked by Rivals.com as the number one quarterback in his class. He committed to play college football for the Oregon Ducks.
