= Richard Brown (linebacker) =

Samoan gridiron football player (born 1965)

No. 92, 90, 52
- Position: Linebacker

Personal information
- Born: September 21, 1965 (age 61); Western Samoa
- Listed height: 6 ft 3 in (1.91 m)
- Listed weight: 240 lb (109 kg)

Career information
- High school: Westminster (Westminster, California, U.S.)
- College: San Diego State
- NFL draft: 1987: undrafted

Career history
- Los Angeles Rams (1987; 1989); San Diego Chargers (1990); Cleveland Browns (1991–1993); Minnesota Vikings (1994–1996)

Career NFL statistics
- Tackles: 161
- Fumble recoveries: 5
- Sacks: 1.5
- Stats at Pro Football Reference

Richard Solomon Brown (born September 21, 1965) is a Samoan former professional football player who was a linebacker in the National Football League (NFL).

Brown attended Westminster High School in Westminster, California and played collegiate football at San Diego State University.

Brown signed with the Los Angeles Rams in 1987 as an undrafted free agent. His nine-year career also included stints with the San Diego Chargers, Cleveland Browns, and Minnesota Vikings.

Brown is the uncle of Nephi Sewell, Noah Sewell, and Penei Sewell, all of whom play in the NFL.
