= Jalen Brewster =

American football player

Buford Wolves
- Position: Defensive tackle

Personal information
- Listed height: 6 ft 3 in (1.91 m)
- Listed weight: 302 lb (137 kg)

Career information
- High school: Cedar Hill (Cedar Hill, Texas); Buford (Buford, Georgia)

Jalen Brewster is an American football defensive tackle at Buford High School in Georgia. He is a five-star recruit and one of the top prospects in the class of 2027.

== Early life ==
Brewster is from Cedar Hill, Texas. He was raised by his father, former National Football League (NFL) offensive lineman Robert Brewster, after his mother died a week after his birth. He grew up playing football, first as a running back, before becoming a defensive lineman as a sophomore at Cedar Hill High School. In addition to being a top defensive tackle, he still was used at times at running back, scoring five touchdowns in his sophomore year. He then scored four rushing touchdowns while posting an average of eight yards per carry as a junior in 2025. Brewster was invited to the Polynesian Bowl, the All-American Bowl and the Under Armour All-America Game. On August 22, 2026, he transferred to Buford High School in Georgia for his senior season.

Brewster is a consensus five-star recruit and one of the top prospects in the class of 2027. He has been ranked by ESPN and Rivals.com as the number one overall prospect in his class, as well as a top five recruit by 247Sports. He committed to play college football for the Texas Tech Red Raiders on October 4, 2025, on a CBS Sports livestream. The Red Raiders head coach, Joey McGuire, had coached at Brewster's high school from 2003 to 2016. In July 2026, Brewster was ranked by ESPN as the best recruit in the country, regardless of class.
