= Will Griffin (quarterback) =

American football player (born 2008)

No. 11 – Florida Gators
- Position: Quarterback
- Class: Freshman

Personal information
- Born: March 7, 2008 (age 18)
- Listed height: 6 ft 3 in (1.91 m)
- Listed weight: 230 lb (104 kg)

Career information
- High school: Jesuit (2022–2025)
- College: Florida (2026–present)

Awards and highlights
- Gatorade Florida Football Player of the Year (2025–2026)
- Stats at ESPN

Will Griffin (born March 7, 2008) is an American football quarterback at the University of Florida..

== Career ==
Griffin was born in Tampa, Florida, and attends Tampa Jesuit High School. Playing quarterback for the Jesuit Tigers, he emerged as one of the top high school prospects in the class of 2026.

During his junior season in 2024, Griffin threw for 3,404 yards and 34 touchdowns, leading his team to a 10–2 record. Over his first two seasons as a starter, he accumulated 7,552 passing yards and 89 touchdowns.

In January 2025, Griffin participated in the Under Armour All-American Game in Orlando, Florida, Representing Team Ignite, he completed 11 of 22 passes for 82 yards, and faced 3 sacks.

Griffin committed to the University of Florida on June 10, 2024, becoming the first commit in the Gators' 2026 recruiting class.

A lifelong fan of the Gators, he chose Florida over offers from Florida State, Auburn, Indiana, Arkansas, Ohio State, among others.

Recruiting services ranked him as a four-star prospect, with 247Sports placing him as the No. 151 overall recruit and No. 11 quarterback nationally, while On3 ranked him No. 104 overall and No. 8 at his position and he is Florida's #2 all-time passing TD leader.

In the spring of 2025, Griffin participated in the Elite 11 Finals. Griffin's recruiting efforts were credited with helping Florida secure a top-10 recruiting class for 2026.

During a spring scrimmage in 2025, Griffin threw for 300 yards and two touchdowns while rushing for 45 yards and a touchdown.

Griffin is the 2025-2026 Gatorade Florida Football Player of the Year.

== Statistics ==
Senior Year

Stat	Value
Passing yards	2,534
Touchdown Passes	37

Career (All-Time HS)

Stat	Value
Career Passing Yards	12,299
Career Touchdown Passes	143

== Personal life ==
Griffin is a native of Tampa, Florida, and has expressed a lifelong affinity for the University of Florida, citing former Gators quarterback Tim Tebow as an inspiration.
