= Helaman Casuga =

American football player (born 2007)

No. 16 – Texas A&M Aggies
- Position: Quarterback
- Class: Freshman

Personal information
- Born: July 9, 2007 (age 19)
- Listed height: 6 ft 0 in (1.83 m)
- Listed weight: 200 lb (91 kg)

Career information
- High school: Corner Canyon (Draper, Utah)
- College: Texas A&M (2026–present)

Awards and highlights
- Polynesian High School Football Player of the Year (2025)
- Stats at ESPN

Helaman Casuga (born July 9, 2007) is an American college football quarterback for the Texas A&M Aggies.

== Early life ==
Casuga began playing high school football at Timpview High School in Provo, Utah and lettered both years. Casuga began starting for Timpview during his freshman year and completed 70.6% for 2,330 yards and 26 TD that season. The following year, Casuga passed for 4,135 passing yards and 33 touchdowns.

Before the 2024 season, Casuga transferred to Corner Canyon High School in Draper, Utah where he would play the following two seasons. As a junior, Casuga passed for 1,617 yards and 18 touchdowns before missing the second half of the season due to injury. Casuga qualified for the Elite 11 Finals during the summer before his senior year. At the competition, he was named On3's Elite 11 Day 2 MVP. During his senior season, Casuga completed 68.2 percent of his passes for 3,487 yards and 37 touchdowns against just nine interceptions. Following the season, Casuga was named the Polynesian High School Football Player of the Year.

Casuga won the UHSAA 5A state football title in 2023 and the 6A state title in 2024 and 2025. He also led Timpview to finish the 2022 season as the 5A championship runner-up.

Casuga was a consensus four-star prospect and ranked as a top 20 quarterback prospect according to Rivals/On3, 247Sports, and ESPN. He received offers from a number of Power Four programs such as BYU, Oregon, and Texas A&M. He ultimately committed to Texas A&M on October 17, 2024. Despite the departure of offensive coordinator Collin Klein, Casuga remained firm in his commitment. He signed with the Aggies on December 3, 2025.

College recruiting
Name	Hometown	School	Height	Weight	Commit date
Helaman Casuga; QB	Provo, Utah	Corner Canyon	6 ft 1 in (1.85 m)	200 lb (91 kg)	Oct 17, 2024
Helaman Casuga; QB	Recruit ratings: Rivals: 247Sports: ESPN: (81)				

== College career ==
Casuga enrolled early at Texas A&M joining the Aggies in January, where he competed for the backup quarterback role against sophomore Brady Hart.

== Personal life ==
Casuga is the son of son of Nephi and Lorie Casuga. He is of Hawaiian descent. He is a member of the Church of Jesus Christ of Latter Day Saints.
