= David Gabriel Georges =

American football player (born 2008)

No. 0 – Baylor Red Raiders
- Position: Running back
- Class: Senior

Personal information
- Born: June 27, 2008 (age 18); Quebec, Canada
- Listed height: 5 ft 11 in (1.80 m)
- Listed weight: 200 lb (91 kg)

Career information
- High school: Baylor School (Chattanooga, Tennessee)

David Gabriel Georges (born June 27, 2008) is a Canadian–American football running back at Baylor School in Chattanooga, Tennessee. He is a five-star recruit and one of the top prospects in the class of 2027. He is committed to the University of Tennessee to play for the Volunteers.

== Early life ==
Gabriel Georges was born on June 27, 2008, in Quebec, Canada, and is of Haitian descent. He grew up in Terrebonne and first played football at age five. After initially playing as a linebacker, Gabriel Georges later changed his position to running back. He first attended Armand-Corbeil High School in Terrebonne where he played as a freshman.

Gabriel Georges moved to the U.S. for his second year and enrolled at Baylor School in Chattanooga, Tennessee, a school that had become interested in him after his uncle sent the football coach a highlight film. He had to learn English after moving to Tennessee, as at the time he only spoke French. In his first year at Baylor, Gabriel Georges ran for 984 yards and 13 touchdowns in the regular season and helped the team to the DII-AA state championship, earning the DII-AA Mr. Football award. The following year, Gabriel Georges helped Baylor to their first undefeated record in over 50 years along with the Division II-AAA state title, running for 1,756 yards and 27 touchdowns while averaging nearly 11 yards per attempt. He was named the National Player of the Year by MaxPreps and was the first non-senior to receive the honor since JT Daniels in 2017, also being the first Canadian winner of the award.

Gabriel Georges is a five-star recruit and one of the top prospects in the class of 2027. He is ranked by 247Sports as a top-10 recruit nationally and the number two running back. On July 22, he ultimately chose the Tennessee Volunteers, out of a final three schools which included the Ohio State Buckeyes and the Ole Miss Rebels.
