= Landon Duckworth =

American football player (born 2007)

No. 14 – South Carolina Gamecocks
- Position: Quarterback
- Class: Freshman

Personal information
- Born: November 7, 2007 (age 19)
- Listed height: 6 ft 3 in (1.91 m)
- Listed weight: 195 lb (88 kg)

Career information
- High school: Jackson (Jackson, Alabama)
- College: South Carolina (2026–present)

Landon Duckworth (born November 7, 2007) is an American college football quarterback for the South Carolina Gamecocks.

== Early life ==
Duckworth attended Jackson High School in Jackson, Alabama, where he became starting quarterback as a freshman in 2022, throwing for 1,985 yards and 20 touchdowns while also running for eight touchdowns. As a sophomore, he threw for 1,971 yards and 27 touchdowns and ran for five touchdowns. As a junior, he was named the Class 4A Back of the Year after throwing for 3,439 yards and 12 touchdowns while also running for 648 yards and 12 touchdowns, helping Jackson to the 4A state championship where Duckworth threw five touchdowns in a 69–6 win. He was named AL.com's Coastal Male Athlete of the Year for 2024–25. As a senior, he led the team to another state championship, winning by a 52–0 score. At Jackson, Duckworth also helped the basketball team to two state championships and won a state championship in track and field in the 4 × 100 metres relay. He was invited to the All-American Bowl and participated at the Elite 11 finals.

Duckworth was ranked a four-star recruit, the sixth-best player in the state and a top-10 quarterback recruit nationally in the class of 2026. He committed to play college football for the South Carolina Gamecocks in 2023, but de-committed in 2024. Duckworth re-committed in July 2025. He signed with the Gamecocks in December 2025.
