= Orem High School =

School in Utah, USA

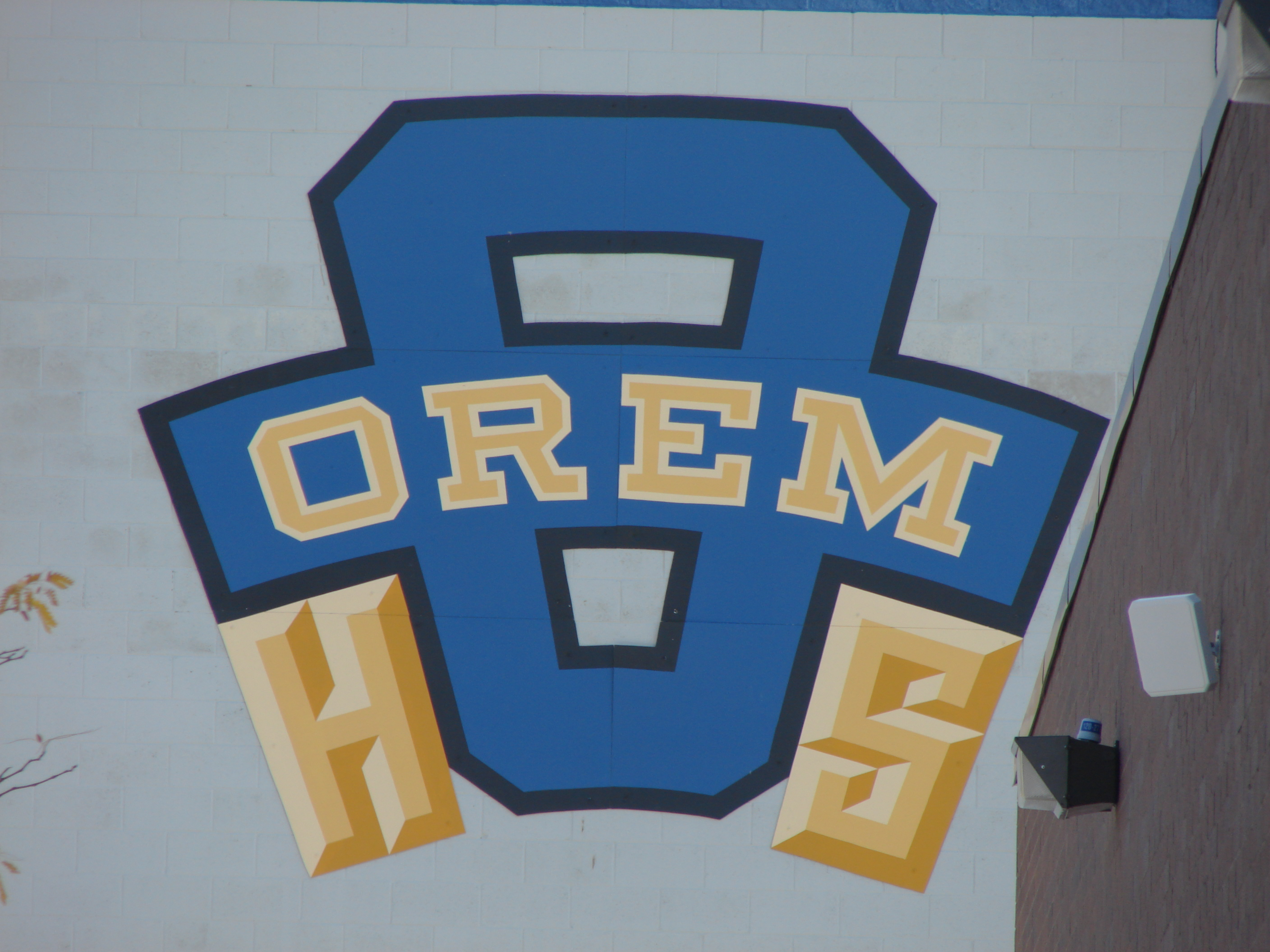

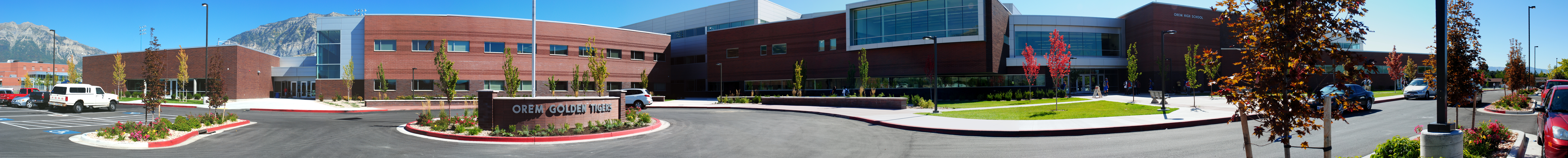

Location
- 175 S 400 E Orem, Utah; United States; 40°17′32″N 111°41′03″W

Information
- Type: Public three-year
- Established: 1956
- Principal: Tamara Stuart
- Teaching staff: 51.86 (on an FTE basis)
- Enrollment: 1,225 (2024-2025)
- Student to teacher ratio: 23.62
- Colors: Blue, Gold
- Mascot: Golden Tiger
- Rival: Mountain View High School; Timpanogos High School
- Information: 801-227-8765
- Website: https://ohs.alpineschools.org/

Orem High School is a high school in Orem, Utah, part of the Alpine School District. It was originally built in 1956, and has since undergone major renovations. The old school building was torn down and a replacement was built in what was the former building's parking lot, in 2010.

== Notable alumni ==
- Kurt Bestor, composer and musician
- Paul Alan Cox, ethnobotanist and conservationist
- Gary Crowton, American football coach
- Matt Gay, American football player
- Gary Herbert, governor of Utah
- Cooper Legas, college football quarterback
- Chad Lewis, American football player
- Dave McCann, Sportscaster
- Puka Nacua, football player
- Jakob Robinson, football player
- Paxton Schultz, baseball player
- Noah Sewell, football player
- Kingsley Suamataia, football player
