= Desert Hills High School (Utah) =

Public school in St. George, Utah, United States

Location
- 828 East Desert Hills Drive; St. George, Utah 84790; United States; 37°03′03″N 113°33′50″W

Information
- Type: Public three-year
- Motto: Focused On The Future
- Established: 2008
- School district: Washington County School District
- NCES District ID: 4901140
- CEEB code: 450359
- NCES School ID: 490114001290
- Principal: Justin Keate
- Teaching staff: 46.61 (FTE)
- Grades: 10-12
- Enrollment: 1,208 (2023–2024)
- Student to teacher ratio: 25.92
- Colors: Black , purple and gold
- Mascot: Thor
- Teams: Thunder
- Accreditation: Cognia (education) formerly AdvancEd
- Feeder schools: Desert Hills Middle School, Sunrise Ridge Intermediate School
- Website: dhthunder.org

Desert Hills High School (DHHS) is located in St. George, Utah, United States, and is the second newest of the five St. George 4A public high schools. It is a part of the Washington County School District. Zone: south St. George, Bloomington, Bloomington Hills, Little Valley. Desert Hills High School's nickname is the Thunder and its mascot is Thor.

== Sports ==
DHHS competes in the 4A division in Region 9 with all other Washington County (besides Enterprise High School). They also share the region with Cedar City High School in Iron County, Utah.

== Demographics ==
Desert Hills High School is considered by the NCES to be classified within a Rural: Fringe (41) area, defined as rural territory that is less than or equal to 5 miles from an urbanized area, as well as rural territory that is less than or equal to 2.5 miles from an urban cluster. NCES reports that 10.7% of students at DHHS are considered free lunch eligible, and 2.3% reduced-price lunch eligible.

Desert Hills High School race/ethnicity (2018-19)
1. American Indian/ Alaska Native (0.20%)
2. Asian (1.10%)
3. Black (0.40%)
4. Hispanic (4.60%)
5. Native Hawaiian/ Pacific Islander (1.80%)
6. White (90.6%)
7. Two or more Races (1.30%)
NCES
Desert Hills High School Gender (2018-19)
1. Female (47.8%)
2. Male (52.2%)
NCES

== Notable alumni ==
Penei Sewell – NFL player for the Detroit Lions

Nephi Sewell – NFL player for the New Orleans Saints
