= Corner Canyon High School =

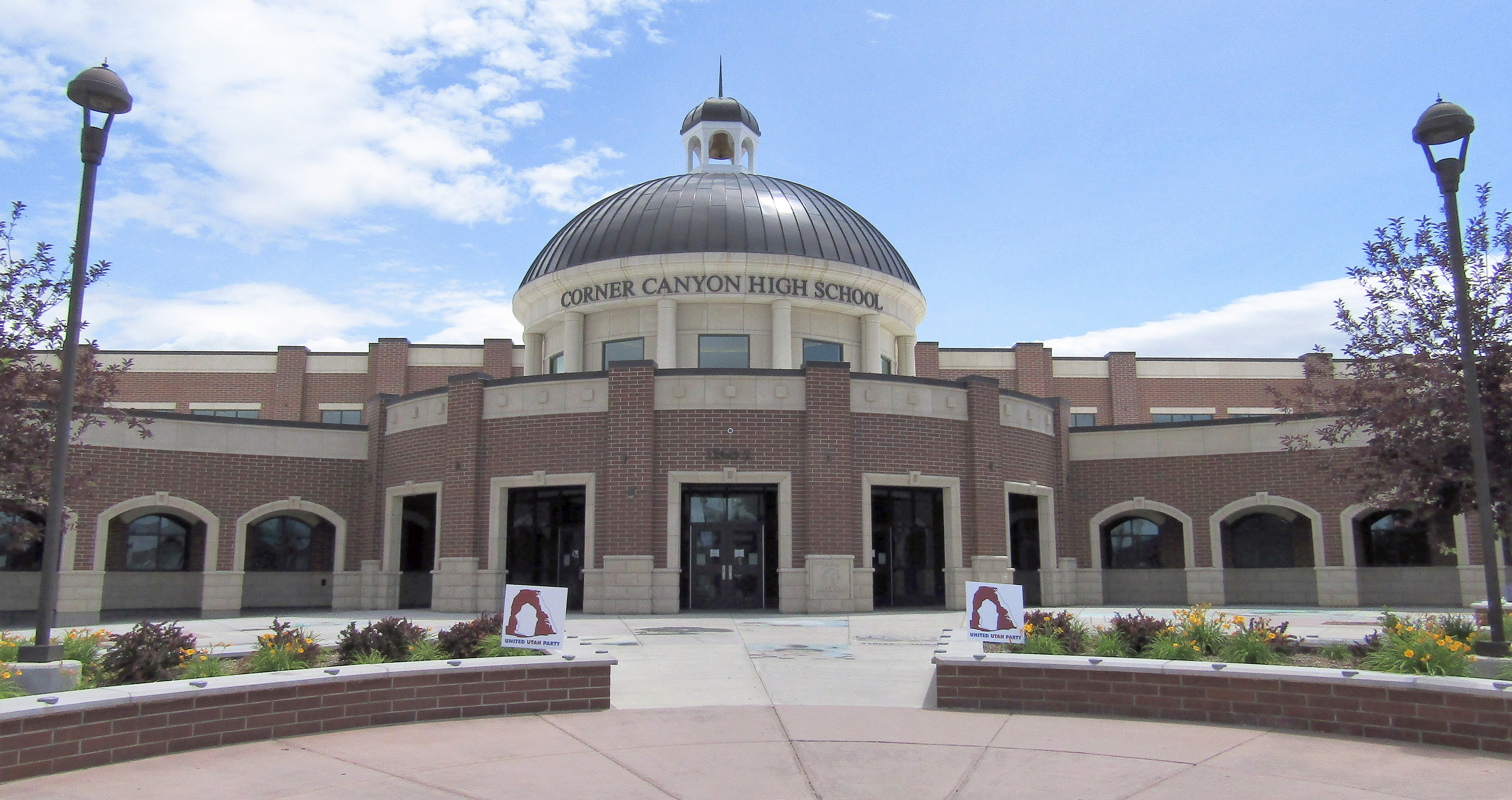

Location
- 12943 S. 700 E Draper, Utah 84020; United States; 40°31′01″N 111°52′13″W

Information
- Established: 2013
- School district: Canyons School District
- Principal: Dina Kohler
- Teaching staff: 91.65 (FTE)
- Grades: 9–12th
- Enrollment: 2,451 (2023–2024)
- Student to teacher ratio: 26.74
- Colors: Navy, silver and white
- Nickname: Chargers
- Website: Official website

Corner Canyon High School is a public school in Draper, Utah. It is the newest high school in the Canyons School District. Its colors are navy, silver and white, and its mascot is the Chargers.

== History ==
Corner Canyon High School opened in 2013. It was built at 12943 S. 700 East in Draper, Utah, using funds from a $250 million bond approved by voters in 2010. Its classroom wings are two stories tall, and it includes a lecture hall, an auditorium, a 3,300 seat gymnasium, and a football field with artificial turf. It was the first comprehensive high school in Draper, and the first new high school built by Canyons School District after it split from the Jordan District in 2009. It serves the community of Draper in the southeast corner of Salt Lake County.

In 2022, Corner Canyon received the highest ranking of all traditional high schools in the state of Utah. According to the U.S. News’ rankings, Corner Canyon was ranked seventh best, with the top six spots in the state going to public charter schools. Rankings were based on College Readiness, AP Class Offerings among other criteria.

== Athletics ==
Since opening its doors, Corner Canyon has seen substantial success in athletics. The Chargers have won seven state titles in football, and have finished the season nationally ranked in the top 50 by Maxpreps in 2022–2023 (13th), 2021–2022 (43rd), 2020–2021 (9th), 2019–2020 (8th), and 2018–2019 (47th)

== Controversies ==
The school received nationwide criticism in October 2020 for its handling of the COVID-19 pandemic. The school reported an excess of 90 cases in a two-week window. The mayor of Draper stated that "he had heard from some Corner Canyon parents that there was an agreement among mothers at the school — he called it a 'mom code' — not to get their children tested for the virus even if they became ill, to avoid adding to the school's case count and contributing to it being shut down".

== Notable alumni ==
- Keaton Bills (2016), offensive guard who played for the Utah Utes
- Zach Wilson (2019), quarterback for the Miami Dolphins
- Van Fillinger (2020), defensive end for the Utah Utes
- Jaxson Dart (2021), quarterback for the New York Giants
- Griffin Dillon (2021), soccer player for the Real Monarchs of the MLS Next Pro
- Jackson Powers-Johnson (2021), offensive guard for the Las Vegas Raiders
- Devin Brown (2022), quarterback for the Weber State Wildcats
- Isaac Wilson (2024), quarterback for the Utah Utes
- Helaman Casuga (2026), quarterback for the Texas A&M Aggies
