= Kavian Bryant =

American football player (born 2009)

Profile
- Position: Quarterback

Personal information
- Born: July 9, 2009 (age 17)
- Listed height: 6 ft 3 in (1.91 m)
- Listed weight: 180 lb (82 kg)

Career information
- High school: Westwood (Palestine, Texas)

Kavian Bryant (born July 9, 2009) is an American football quarterback. He is committed to play college football for the Texas Tech Red Raiders.

== Early life ==
Bryant attends Westwood High School in Palestine, Texas, where he plays football and basketball. As a freshman, he passed for 2,282 yards with 33 touchdowns and as a sophomore had 2,442 yards and 34 touchdowns. He also had a combined 1,521 and 20 touchdowns over those years. In the first game of his junior year in 2025, he set a school record with 558 total yards (469 passing and 89 rushing).

A five-star recruit, Bryan is ranked among the best quarterbacks in the 2027 class. He committed to Texas Tech University to play college football.
