= A'mir Sears =

American football player

No. 1 – Christopher Columbus Explorers
- Positions: Cornerback, wide receiver
- Class: Junior

Personal information
- Listed height: 6 ft 1 in (1.85 m)
- Listed weight: 175 lb (79 kg)

Career information
- High school: Christopher Columbus (Miami, Florida)
- College: Miami (FL) (commit)

A'mir Sears (born c. 2010) is an American football cornerback and wide receiver at Christopher Columbus High School in Miami, Florida. Rated as a five-star recruit, he is committed to playing college football for the Miami Hurricanes.

== Early life ==
Sears was the fourth of seven siblings and grew up in the Fort Lauderdale area. He started playing football from a young age, often competing against much older competition.

Sears initially attended West Broward High School in Pembroke Pines, Florida. As a freshman, he recorded 57 tackles, 4.5 tackles for loss, four interceptions, and one forced fumble, to go along with 25 receptions for 501 yards and five touchdowns, as well as a kick return touchdown. Sears was named a first-team freshman All-American by MaxPreps. He was also a standout performer in the 2024 FBU Freshman All-American Bowl. As a sophomore, Sears posted 61 tackles, 11 pass breakups, three interceptions, and one forced fumble on defense, while tallying 42 receptions (Note: Other sources credit Sears with 49 catches.) for 942 yards and 11 touchdowns on offense. He helped West Broward to its first state championship appearance, advancing to the Class 6A title game. He was named a first-team sophomore All-American by MaxPreps and a first-team All-Broward County 7A-5A selection by the Sun Sentinel. In January 2026, Sears helped the South Florida Express win the Battle Miami 7-on-7 championship. He earned the title of "Alpha Dog" from 247Sports as the top performer at the event, drawing comparisons to Travis Hunter for his two-way ability.

After two years at West Broward, Sears transferred to Christopher Columbus High School in Miami. He also re-classified to the class of 2027, turning his junior season into his final year of high school football. In the season opener, Sears scored a 38-yard touchdown on his first reception in a 45–7 win over Miami Southridge High School. In the next game, he recorded five catches for 67 yards and two touchdowns on offense and three interceptions on defense in a 33–28 upset victory over Bishop Gorman High School – the No. 1 ranked team in the nation by both ESPN and MaxPreps – at the Broward County Showcase. Two weeks later, Sears caught a touchdown pass and scored again on a fumble recovery in a 34–7 win over Palmetto High School. On October 1, he registered a 75-yard kick return for a touchdown in a 53–0 blowout victory over Southwest Miami High School.

=== Recruiting ===
Sears was primarily listed by recruiting services as a cornerback, though also earned the "athlete" designation.

In August 2025, Sears was ranked the No. 4 prospect in the initial Rivals.com 2028 class rankings. In the initial release of the full Rivals 300 rankings in March 2026, he retained the No. 4 spot. Sears was named the No. 4 recruit in the class by ESPN in the inaugural 2028 SC Next Junior 300 in May. The following month, he was named the top prospect in the class by 247Sports upon the release of the first full 2028 Top247 rankings. 247Sports director of scouting Andrew Ivins described Sears as a "wiry, two-way playmaker with big-time athleticism and exceptional processing powers" while comparing him to Travis Hunter. Despite reclassifying into the class of 2027, he retained his status as a five-star recruit from 247Sports.

Sears had more than 40 college offers by April 2026. He trimmed the list down to his top choices: Auburn, Florida, LSU, Miami, Michigan, Notre Dame, Ohio State, Oregon, Syracuse, and Texas A&M. In July 2026, Sears announced he would be reclassifying into the class of 2027. A few days later, he verbally committed to playing college football at the University of Miami for head coach Mario Cristobal. In a first-person written story published in The Palm Beach Post, Sears explained: "Seeing Miami in the national championship game really showed me that everything coach preached about was coming to fruition. Growing up, I heard about the glory days but [had] never seen it. Now I have."

== College career ==
Sears is scheduled to enroll at Miami as a 16-year-old in January 2027.

== Personal life ==
Sears grew up as a fan of the Miami Hurricanes. He has a tattoo on his arm reading "Long Live Mari" in honor of his oldest brother, Kamari, who was shot and killed on July 4, 2026.

By the start of his junior year of high school, Sears had name, image, and likeness (NIL) deals with Adidas, Shock Doctor, and Gopuff.
