= Isaac Wilson (American football) =

American football player

No. 16 – Colorado Buffaloes
- Position: Quarterback
- Class: Redshirt Sophomore

Personal information
- Listed height: 6 ft 0 in (1.83 m)
- Listed weight: 210 lb (95 kg)

Career information
- High school: Corner Canyon (Draper, Utah)
- College: Utah (2024–2025); Colorado (2026–present)

Awards and highlights
- Polynesian High School Football Player of the Year (2023)
- Stats at ESPN

Isaac Lakeke Wilson is an American football quarterback for the Colorado Buffaloes. He previously played for the Utah Utes.

== Early life ==
Wilson attended Corner Canyon High School in Draper, Utah. As a freshman, he threw for 27 yards in three games as backup quarterback as his team won a state championship. As a junior, Wilson threw for 3,772 yards and 40 touchdowns and ran for 694 yards and five touchdowns, leading his team to a state championship game appearance. As a senior he threw for 4,508 yards and 49 touchdowns and rushed for 1,270 yards and 13 touchdowns, leading his team to a 13-1 record and a state championship win. Wilson was named the Utah Gatorade Player of the Year and the co-Polynesian football player of the year.

=== Recruiting ===
Wilson was rated as a four-star recruit and committed to play college football for the Utah Utes over offers from schools such as Arizona, Arizona State, BYU, Miami, and Oregon.

== College career ==
As a freshman at the University of Utah in 2024, Wilson competed for the Utes backup quarterback spot. On December 8, 2024, he announced that he would enter the transfer portal. He withdrew from the portal on December 17.

=== Statistics ===
Year	Team	Games			Passing								Rushing			
Year	Team	GP	GS	Record	Comp	Att	Pct	Yards	Avg	TD	Int	Rate	Att	Yards	Avg	TD
2024	Utah	9	7	2–5	127	225	56.4	1,510	6.7	10	11	117.7	61	47	0.8	0
2025	Utah	1	0	0–0	0	1	0.0	0	0.0	0	0	0.0	3	3	1.0	0
2026	Colorado	4	2	0–2	58	101	57.4	699	6.9	4	5	118.4	29	72	2.5	0
Career		14	9	2–7	185	327	56.6	2,209	6.8	14	16	117.7	93	122	1.3	0

== Personal life ==
Wilson is the younger brother of former second overall pick and current New Orleans Saints quarterback Zach Wilson. Although he was baptized a member of the Church of Jesus Christ of Latter-day Saints, he is not an active member. His middle name, Lakeke, means 'jacket' in the Hawaiian language.
