= Nephi Sewell =

American football player (born 1998)

No. 46 – Chicago Bears
- Position: Linebacker
- Roster status: Injured reserve

Personal information
- Born: December 19, 1998 (age 27); Malaeimi, American Samoa
- Listed height: 6 ft 0 in (1.83 m)
- Listed weight: 228 lb (103 kg)

Career information
- High school: Desert Hills (St. George, Utah, U.S.)
- College: Nevada (2017–2018); Utah (2019–2021)
- NFL draft: 2022: undrafted

Career history
- New Orleans Saints (2022–2025); Chicago Bears (2025–present)*
- * Offseason or practice squad member only

Career NFL statistics as of 2025
- Total tackles: 26
- Sacks: 1
- Forced fumbles: 1
- Stats at Pro Football Reference

Nephi Sewell (born December 19, 1998) is an American Samoan professional football linebacker for the Chicago Bears of the National Football League (NFL). He played college football for the Nevada Wolf Pack and Utah Utes and was signed by the Saints as an undrafted free agent in 2022.

== Early life ==
Sewell was born on December 19, 1998, in American Samoa. He moved to the United States in 2012, and attended Desert Hills High School in Utah. After recording 48 tackles and five interceptions as a sophomore, Sewell missed his entire junior season after suffering a broken neck in his first game of that year. Although he was told he may never play football again, Sewell was determined to play, and ended up recovering in time for his senior season, where he played running back and ran for over 1,250 yards and scored 16 touchdowns, while helping his team win the state championship.

== College career ==
Sewell committed to play college football at the University of Nevada in 2017. He saw immediate playing time as a true freshman, being named the school's player of the week in his debut, where he recorded five tackles at safety. He finished his first season at the school with 12 games played, eight as a starter, and 58 tackles, as well as an interception and a fumble forced and recovered.

As a sophomore in 2018, Sewell started 11 games and finished the year with 53 tackles, one interception and one fumble recovered. His announced his intention to transfer after the season, and although originally committing to BYU, he ended up transferring to Utah. In his first season with the school, he appeared in three games and made 14 tackles. Sewell changed his position from safety to linebacker for the 2020 season, and placed second on the team with 40 tackles, while starting all five of their games.

In 2021, Sewell appeared in 13 games, all but one of which he was a starter in at linebacker. He made a total of 89 tackles, placing second on the team, and additionally recorded one forced fumble and an interception. He had three games with more than 10 tackles and ranked eighth in the conference for average tackles-per-game with 6.8, being named first-team all-conference by Associated Press (AP). Sewell declared for the NFL draft following the 2021 season. He finished his collegiate career with 44 career games played and 37 starts.

== Professional career ==
Pre-draft measurables
Height	Weight	Arm length	Hand span	Wingspan	40-yard dash	10-yard split	20-yard split	20-yard shuttle	Three-cone drill	Vertical jump	Broad jump	Bench press
5 ft 11 1/2 in (1.82 m)	226 lb (103 kg)	29 3/8 in (0.75 m)	8 1/2 in (0.22 m)	5 ft 11 in (1.80 m)	4.67 s	1.64 s	2.69 s	4.33 s	7.01 s	32.0 in (0.81 m)	10 ft 0 in (3.05 m)	24 reps
All values from NFL Combine/Pro Day

=== New Orleans Saints ===
After going unselected in the 2022 NFL draft, Sewell was signed by the New Orleans Saints as an undrafted free agent. He was waived at the final roster cuts on August 30, and was subsequently re-signed to the practice squad. He was promoted to the active roster on November 10, and made his NFL debut in the Saints' 20–10 loss to the Pittsburgh Steelers in Week 10. He was waived on December 17 and re-signed to the practice squad. He signed a reserve/future contract on January 9, 2023.

Sewell made the Saints final roster in 2023 as a special teamer, playing in 16 games.

On August 27, 2024, Sewell was placed on the reserve/physically unable to perform (PUP) list to begin the season. He was activated on November 16. In New Orleans' season finale against the Tampa Bay Buccaneers, Sewell recorded his first career sack against Baker Mayfield.

On August 26, 2025, Sewell was waived by the Saints as part of final roster cuts and re-signed to the practice squad the next day.

=== Chicago Bears ===
On January 13, 2026, Sewell was signed to the Chicago Bears' practice squad. On January 20, he signed a reserve/futures contract with Chicago. On August 25, Sewell was placed on season–ending injured reserve due to a knee injury.

== Personal life ==
Sewell has three brothers who play football: Gabriel, a linebacker for the United Football League (UFL); Noah, a linebacker who also plays on the Bears; and Penei, an offensive tackle for the Detroit Lions. Additionally, his uncles Richard Brown and Isaac Sopoaga played in the NFL.
