= Jake Nawrot =

American football player

Profile
- Position: Quarterback

Personal information
- Listed height: 6 ft 4 in (1.93 m)
- Listed weight: 200 lb (91 kg)

Career information
- High school: John Hersey (Arlington Heights, Illinois)

Jake Nawrot is an American high school football quarterback. He is committed to play college football for the Kentucky Wildcats.

== Early life ==
Nawrot attended John Hersey High School in Arlington Heights, Illinois. After spending his first two years on the junior varsity team, he became the varsity teams starting quarterback his junior year in 2025. In his first season as a starter he passed for 3,078 yards with 41 touchdowns and two interceptions. Nawrot returned to John Hersey as the starter in 2026.

One of the top ranked quarterbacks in his class, he committed to the University of Kentucky to play college football.
