= Elijah Haven =

American football player (born 2008)

The Dunham School
- Position: Quarterback
- Class: Junior

Personal information
- Born: October 2008 (age 18)
- Listed height: 6 ft 5 in (1.96 m)
- Listed weight: 215 lb (98 kg)

Career information
- High school: The Dunham School (St. George, Louisiana)

Elijah Haven (born October 2008) is an American football quarterback at The Dunham School in St. George, Louisiana.

== Biography ==
Haven attended The Dunham School in St. George, Louisiana, where he became a top football and basketball player. In eighth grade, he was a backup quarterback for the football team and also was an all-district performer in basketball. He became starter as a freshman and was responsible for 534 yards of offense and seven touchdowns in his first start. In total, he threw for 2,205 yards and 35 touchdowns to three interceptions as a freshman, helping Dunham to the Division III regional playoffs and the district title while being named honorable mention all-state and All-Metro. He then was an All-Metro and all-state performer as a freshman in basketball, averaging 13 points and 10 rebounds per game.

As a sophomore, Haven led Dunham to an appearance in the state championship game in football. He threw for 3,093 yards and 37 touchdowns as Dunham compiled a record of 14–1, and Haven was named the MaxPreps National Sophomore of the Year. He then averaged 13 points per game in basketball and led Dunham to the state playoff semifinals while being named second-team all-state; he was chosen the Boys Athlete of the Year by The Advocate for his performance.

In a game at the start of the 2025 football season, Haven threw for 402 yards and six touchdowns while running for two more touchdowns. He threw for 3,909 yards and 62 touchdowns with seven interceptions while also running for 832 yards and 11 touchdowns, breaking the state records for single-season passing touchdowns, total touchdowns, as well as the career touchdowns record. Haven led Dunham to the state championship game and threw for 271 yards and three touchdowns, earning game MVP honors while leading the school to their first football championship since 2004. He was named the 2025 Gatorade Louisiana Player of the Year.

A five-star recruit, Haven is the number one ranked quarterback in the recruiting class of 2027. He is ranked by 247Sports as the overall second-best prospect nationally.
