= Noah Sewell =

American football player (born 2002)

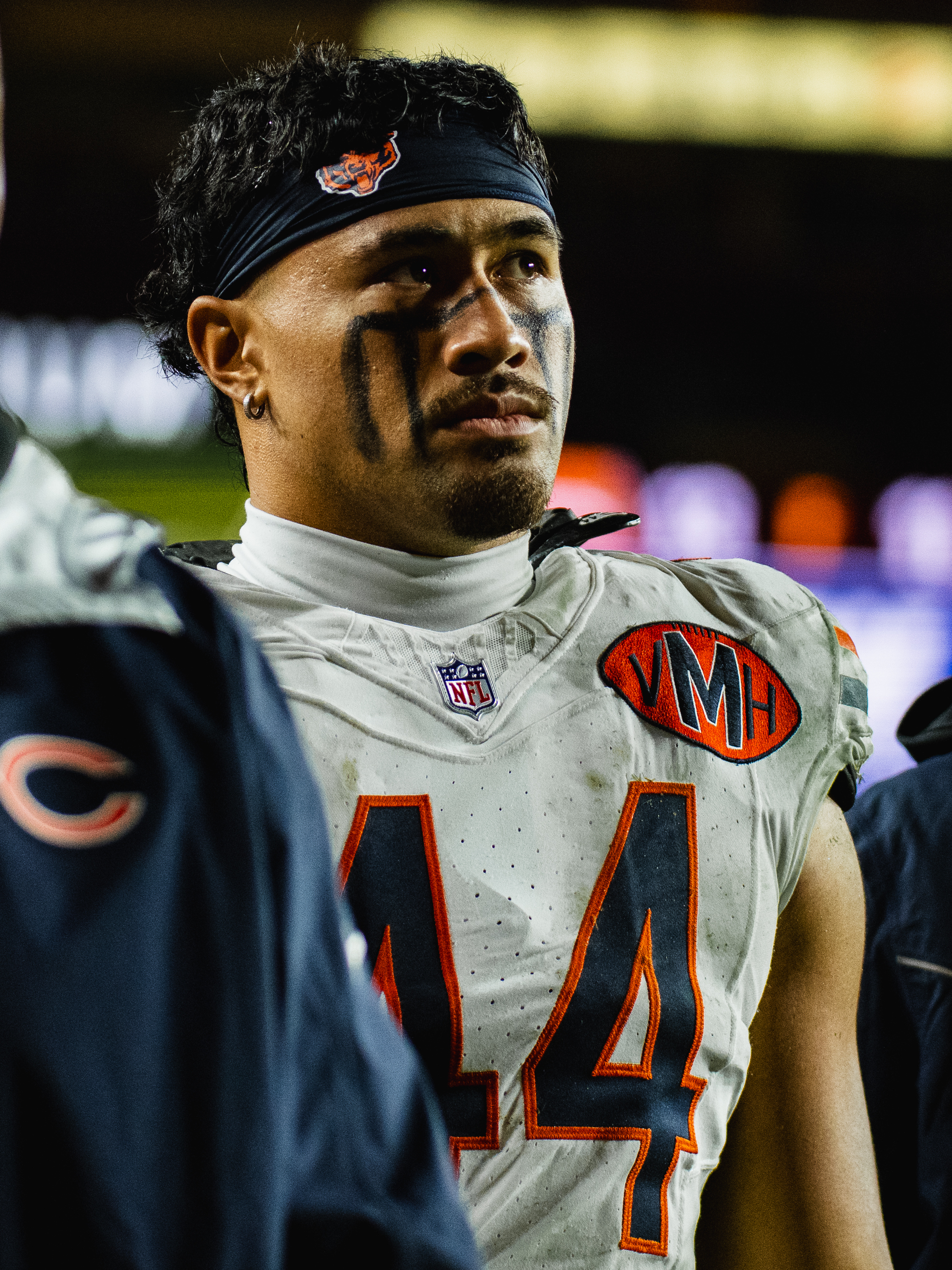
- Sewell with the Chicago Bears in 2025

No. 44 – Chicago Bears
- Position: Linebacker
- Roster status: Active

Personal information
- Born: April 26, 2002 (age 24); Malaeimi, American Samoa
- Listed height: 6 ft 1 in (1.85 m)
- Listed weight: 246 lb (112 kg)

Career information
- High school: Orem (Orem, Utah, U.S.)
- College: Oregon (2020–2022)
- NFL draft: 2023: 5th round, 148th overall pick

Career history
- Chicago Bears (2023–present)

Awards and highlights
- Pac-12 Defensive Freshman of the Year (2020); First-team All-Pac-12 (2021); Second-team All-Pac-12 (2022)

Career NFL statistics as of 2025
- Total tackles: 72
- Forced fumbles: 3
- Stats at Pro Football Reference

Noah Pele Tupua Sewell (born April 26, 2002) is an American Samoan professional football linebacker for the Chicago Bears of the National Football League (NFL). A native of American Samoa, he and his family moved to Utah in 2012 before playing college football at Oregon, where he was named the Pac-12 Defensive Freshman of the Year in 2020 before being selected by the Bears in the fifth round of the 2023 NFL draft. Sewell is the younger brother of NFL players Penei and Nephi Sewell.

== Early life ==
Noah Pele Tupua Sewell hails from the village of Malaeimi in American Samoa. He began playing American football alongside his three brothers as a child after his father Gabriel became a coach of the sport. Seeing the potential for his children to make it to the National Football League (NFL), Gabriel moved his family to St. George, Utah in 2012. There, he attended Desert Hills High School before transferring to Orem High School in Orem, Utah.

During his high school career he had 224 tackles, 8.5 sacks and five interceptions as a linebacker and 2,316 yards and 40 touchdowns as a running back. He was named the Utah Valley Football Player of the Year as a senior in 2019. A five-star recruit, Sewell committed to the University of Oregon to play college football. His brother, Penei, was drafted by the Detroit Lions seventh overall in the 2021 NFL draft. Another brother, Nephi, currently plays for the New Orleans Saints. A third brother, Gabriel, also plays college football.

== College career ==
Sewell was named the Pac-12 Conference Freshman Defensive Player of the Year in 2020.

== Professional career ==
Pre-draft measurables
Height	Weight	Arm length	Hand span	Wingspan	40-yard dash	10-yard split	20-yard split	20-yard shuttle	Three-cone drill	Vertical jump	Broad jump	Bench press
6 ft 1 1/2 in (1.87 m)	246 lb (112 kg)	31 5/8 in (0.80 m)	10 in (0.25 m)	6 ft 4 3/8 in (1.94 m)	4.64 s	1.57 s	2.68 s	4.37 s	7.28 s	33.0 in (0.84 m)	9 ft 7 in (2.92 m)	27 reps
All values from NFL Combine/Pro Day

Sewell was selected by the Chicago Bears in the fifth round (148th overall) in the 2023 NFL draft. As a rookie, he appeared in 13 games and finished with nine total tackles and a forced fumble. In the 2024 season, he appeared in nine games and mainly contributed on special teams.

Sewell was named a starting linebacker in 2025. He played in 13 games (including nine starts), finishing sixth on the team with 59 tackles. On December 31, 2025, Sewell was placed on injured reserve due to an Achilles injury suffered in Week 17 against the San Francisco 49ers.

Sewell began the 2026 season on the PUP list due to his Achilles injury. He was activated on October 10, 2026.

== NFL career statistics ==
Legend
**Bold**	Career high

=== Regular season ===
Year	Team	Games		Tackles					Interceptions						Fumbles				
Year	Team	GP	GS	Cmb	Solo	Ast	Sck	TFL	Int	Yds	Avg	Lng	TD	PD	FF	Fum	FR	Yds	TD
2023	CHI	**13**	0	9	4	5	0.0	0	0	0	0.0	0	0	0	**1**	0	0	0	0
2024	CHI	9	0	4	3	1	0.0	0	0	0	0.0	0	0	0	**1**	0	0	0	0
2025	CHI	**13**	**9**	**59**	**33**	**26**	0.0	**3**	0	0	0.0	0	0	0	**1**	0	0	0	0
Career		35	9	72	40	32	0.0	3	0	0	0.0	0	0	0	3	0	0	0	0

== Personal life ==
Sewell is a member of the Church of Jesus Christ of Latter-day Saints.
