= Israel Abrams =

American football player (born 2008)

Profile
- Position: Quarterback

Personal information
- Born: November 6, 2008 (age 18)
- Listed height: 6 ft 4 in (1.93 m)
- Listed weight: 187 lb (85 kg)

Career information
- High school: Montini Catholic (Lombard, Illinois)

Israel Abrams (born November 6, 2008) is an American football quarterback. He is committed to play college football for the Miami Hurricanes.

== Early life ==
Abrams attended St. Viator High School in Arlington Heights, Illinois as a freshman before transferring to Montini Catholic High School in Lombard, Illinois prior to his sophomore year. As a sophomore in 2024, he passed for 2,033 yards and 29 touchdowns and led his team to the Illinois 3A championship. As a junior in 2025, Abrams was the MaxPreps Illinois Player of the Year after passing for 4,072 yards and 40 touchdowns. He led his team to the Class 4A title championship, where he threw for 425 yards and four touchdowns.

A five-star recruit, Abrams is ranked among the best quarterbacks in the class of 2027. He committed to the University of Miami to play college football.
