= Penei Sewell =

American Samoan football player (born 2000)

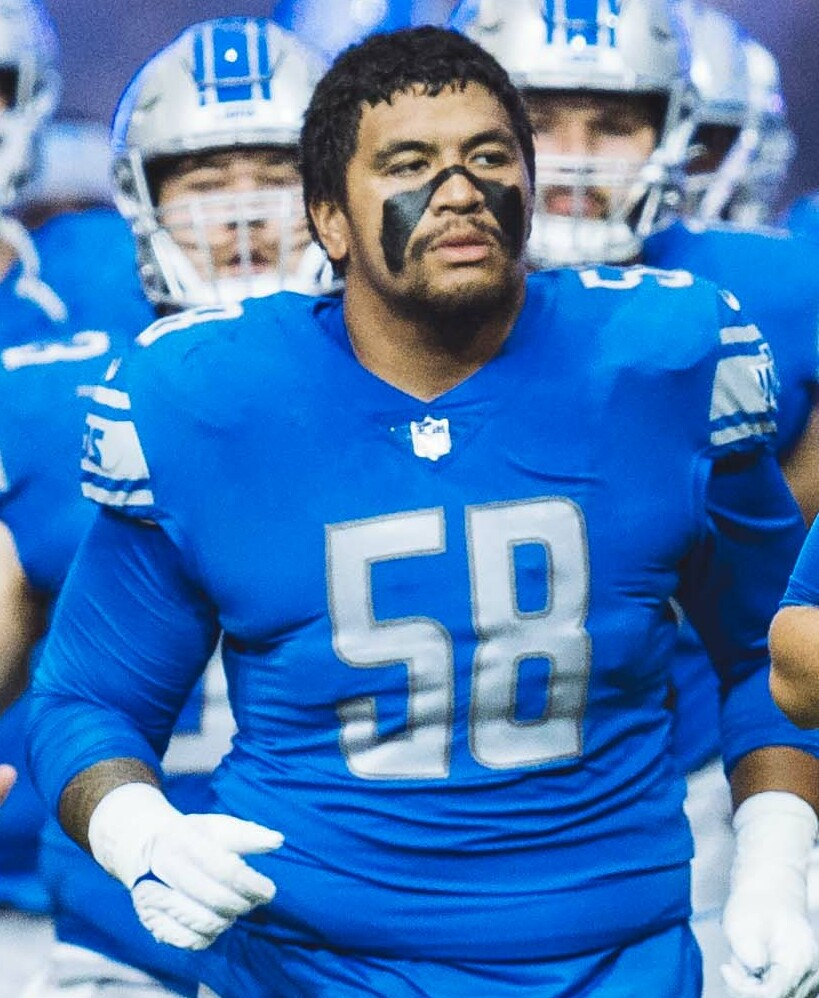
- Sewell with the Detroit Lions in 2022

No. 58 – Detroit Lions
- Position: Offensive tackle
- Roster status: Active

Personal information
- Born: October 9, 2000 (age 26); Malaeimi, American Samoa
- Listed height: 6 ft 5 in (1.96 m)
- Listed weight: 335 lb (152 kg)

Career information
- High school: Desert Hills (St. George, Utah, U.S.)
- College: Oregon (2018–2020)
- NFL draft: 2021: 1st round, 7th overall pick

Career history
- Detroit Lions (2021–present)

Awards and highlights
- 3× First-team All-Pro (2023–2025); 4× Pro Bowl (2022–2025); PFWA All-Rookie Team (2021); Polynesian Professional Football Player of the Year (2024); Outland Trophy (2019); Polynesian College Football Player of the Year (2019); Morris Trophy (2019); Unanimous All-American (2019); First-team All-Pac-12 (2019)

Career NFL statistics as of Week 10, 2026
- Games played: 92
- Games started: 92
- Stats at Pro Football Reference

Penei Elama Sewell (/pɛnˈneɪ/ pen-NAY; born October 9, 2000) is an American Samoan professional football offensive tackle for the Detroit Lions of the National Football League (NFL). He played college football for the Oregon Ducks, winning the Outland and Morris trophies in 2019. Sewell was selected with the seventh overall pick by the Lions in the first round in the 2021 NFL draft. He earned four Pro Bowl selections from 2022 to 2025, and was a first-team All-Pro in 2023, 2024, and 2025. He is the brother of Nephi and Noah Sewell, who both play linebacker for the Chicago Bears.

== Early life ==
Penei Elama Sewell was born on October 9, 2000, in Malaeimi, a village in American Samoa near the capital of Pago Pago. As a child, he began playing American football alongside his three brothers after his father Gabriel became a coach of the sport. Seeing the potential for his children to make it to the National Football League (NFL), Gabriel moved his family to St. George, Utah in 2012. There, Sewell attended and played football at Desert Hills High School. As a senior in 2017, he played in the US Army All-American and Polynesian Bowls before committing to the University of Oregon to play college football for the Oregon Ducks.

== College career ==
Sewell became an immediate starter during his freshman year for the Ducks in 2018, starting seven games but missing six due to a high ankle sprain. He returned in 2019 and won the Morris Trophy and Outland Trophy. In addition, he and former Alabama quarterback Tua Tagovailoa were selected as co-recipients of the 2019 Polynesian College Football Player of the Year award. Sewell opted out of the 2020 season due to the COVID-19 pandemic and declared for the 2021 NFL draft.

== Professional career ==
Pre-draft measurables
Height	Weight	Arm length	Hand span	Wingspan	40-yard dash	10-yard split	20-yard split	20-yard shuttle	Three-cone drill	Vertical jump	Broad jump	Bench press
6 ft 4 7/8 in (1.95 m)	331 lb (150 kg)	33 1/4 in (0.84 m)	10 3/8 in (0.26 m)	6 ft 8 7/8 in (2.05 m)	5.09 s	1.79 s	2.97 s	4.68 s	7.76 s	28.0 in (0.71 m)	9 ft 1 in (2.77 m)	30 reps
All values from Pro Day

=== 2021 ===
Regarded as one of the best overall prospects in the 2021 NFL draft, Sewell was selected seventh overall by the Detroit Lions. He tested positive for COVID-19 in May 2021 and had to sit out of minicamp. He signed his four-year rookie contract, worth $24.1 million, the same month. In his debut against the San Francisco 49ers, he became the youngest player to ever start at left tackle. Sewell would switch to right tackle midway through the season due to teammate Taylor Decker returning from his injury. As a rookie, he appeared and started in 16 games, only being inactive for the regular season finale. He was named to the 2021 Pro Football Writers Association All-Rookie Team.

=== 2022 ===
In Week 14 of the 2022 season, Sewell had a nine-yard reception late in the fourth quarter to give the Lions a crucial first down in the 34–23 victory over the Minnesota Vikings. In the 2022 season, he started all 17 games only allowing 1.5 sacks and was named a Pro Bowl alternate.

=== 2023 ===
In 2023, Sewell started all 17 games and was selected to his second Pro Bowl and first First-team All-Pro, and played in the NFC Championship with the Lions, where they lost 34–31. Pro Football Focus graded him as the best tackle for the 2023 season with a 92.8 grade. He was ranked 22nd by his fellow players on the NFL Top 100 Players of 2024.

=== 2024 ===
On April 24, 2024, Sewell signed a four-year, $112 million contract extension with the Lions, keeping him under contract through the 2029 season. He started all 17 games in the 2024 season. Pro Football Focus graded him as the third best tackle for the 2024 season with a grade of 89.6. He earned first team All-Pro and Pro Bowl honors for the 2024 season. He was ranked 13th by his fellow players on the NFL Top 100 Players of 2025.

=== 2025 ===
Sewell started in and appeared in 16 games in the 2025 season. He was graded as the best tackle in the NFL for a second time in his career by Pro Football Focus with a 95.2 grade. He earned Pro Bowl and first team All-Pro honors for the 2025 season. He was named a finalist for the inaugural NFL Protector of the Year award.

=== NFL career statistics ===
Year	Team	Games		Offense					
Year	Team	GP	GS	Snaps	Pct	Holding	False Start	Decl/Pen	All/Pen
2021	DET	16	16	1,039	100%	2	5	3	7
2022	DET	17	17	1,142	100%	3	4	1	8
2023	DET	17	17	1,178	100%	4	2	0	6
2024	DET	17	17	1,145	100%	2	3	0	5
2025	DET	16	16	997	97%	1	1	0	2
2026	DET	9	9	601	98%	2	2	1	6
Career		92	92	6,102	99.2	14	19	5	34

== Personal life ==
Sewell has three brothers: Gabriel, Nephi, and Noah, who are all professional football linebackers. Gabriel plays in the United Football League, and Nephi and Noah play for the Chicago Bears. The brothers are nephews of former NFL players Isaac Sopoaga and Richard Brown. Sewell is a member of the Church of Jesus Christ of Latter-day Saints.

Sewell met his wife, Isabelle, at the University of Oregon who was a cheerleader when they first met. They started socially dating in 2020 and were married in 2024.
