= Nacua =

Nacua is a surname. Notable people with the name include:

- Joseph Nacua (1945–2022), Filipino Catholic bishop
- Kai Nacua (born 1995), American football player
- Mike Nacua (born 1973), Filipino actor and comedian known as Pekto
- Puka Nacua (born 2001), American football player
- Samson Nacua (born 1998), American football player
