= 2022 BYU Cougars football team =

American college football season

2022 BYU Cougars football

New Mexico Bowl champion

New Mexico Bowl, W 24–23 vs. SMU
- Conference: Independent
- Record: 8–5
- Head coach: Kalani Sitake (7th season)
- Offensive coordinator: Aaron Roderick (2nd season)
- Offensive scheme: Power spread
- Defensive coordinator: Ilaisa Tuiaki (7th season)
- Base defense: 4–3
- Home stadium: LaVell Edwards Stadium

2022 NCAA Division I FBS independents football records
	Conf.			Overall
Team	W		L	W		L
No. 18 Notre Dame		–		9	–	4
Liberty		–		8	–	5
BYU		–		8	–	5
New Mexico State		–		7	–	6
Army		–		6	–	6
UConn		–		6	–	7
UMass		–		1	–	11
Rankings from AP Poll

The 2022 BYU Cougars football team represented Brigham Young University in the 2022 NCAA Division I FBS football season. The Cougars were led by seventh-year head coach Kalani Sitake and played their home games at LaVell Edwards Stadium. This was the 12th and final year that BYU competed as an NCAA Division I FBS independent as in 2023, the football program joined the Big 12 Conference.

== Before the season ==
=== 2022 recruits ===
Name	Pos.	Height	Weight	Hometown	Notes
Noah Moeaki	TE	6'3"	220	American Fork, Utah	Mission prior to enrolling
Peter Falaniko	OL	6'3"	315	St. George, Utah	
Parker Kingston	WR	6'0"	180	Layton, Utah	
Brooks Jones	DL	6'6"	190	Queen Creek, Arizona	Mission prior to enrolling
Kaden Chidester	DL	6'8"	240	Richfield, Utah	Absent From Fall Roster
Dominique Mckenzie	WR	6'0"	165	St. George, Utah	Mission prior to enrolling
Cooper Ross	DL	6'5"	245	Mesa, Arizona	Mission prior to enrolling
Trevin Ostler	OL	6'5"	240	Bountiful, Utah	
Cody Hagen	WR	6'1"	180	Draper, Utah	Mission prior to enrolling
Aisea Moa	DL	6'3"	245	North Ogden, Utah	
Marcus Mckenzie	DB	6'0"	170	St. George, Utah	Absent From Fall Roster
Cannon Devries	DB	6'0"	165	North Ogden, Utah	Mission prior to enrolling
Liutai Kinikini	LB	6'3"	195	Herriman, Utah	Mission prior to enrolling
Vae Soifua	OL	6'4"	190	Orem, Utah	
Maika Kaufusi	LB	6'3"	185	Cottonwood Heights, Utah	Absent From Fall Roster
Jarinn Kalama	WR	6'3"	200	Honolulu, Hawaii	Mission prior to enrolling
Talin Togiai	OL	6'5"	291	Rigby, Idaho	
Micah Wilson	LB	6'3"	215	Draper, Utah	
Zion Allen	DB	6'1"	150	Stockton, California	
Korbyn Green	DB	6'0"	175	Tulsa, Oklahoma	
Nathaniel Gillis	DB	6'1"	174	San Diego, California	
Zoom Esplin	DL	6'8"	250	Encinitas, California	Absent From Fall Roster
Evan Johnson	DB	6'1"	175	Monterey, California	
Chika Ebunoha	DB	6'0"	175	Tucson, Arizona	
Anthony Olsen	TE	6'4"	220	Salt Lake City, Utah	

=== 2021 returned missionaries ===
Bruce Mitchell	DL	6'4"	265	Freshman
Michael Daley	LB	6'3"	220	Freshman
Logan Fano	LB	6'4"	225	Freshman
Isaiah Glasker	DB	6'5"	205	Freshman
Kyson Hall	WR	5'11"	180	Freshman
Sonny Makasini	OL	6'3"	335	Freshman
Samisoni Peaua	TE	6'3"	225	Freshman
Logan Pili	LB	6'1"	205	Freshman
Preston Rex	WR	6'0"	187	Freshman
Tate Romney	LB	6'3"	220	Freshman
Bodie Schoonover	LB	6'4"	215	Freshman
Isaiah Perez	DL	6'4"	265	Freshman
Carter Krupp	DB	6'1"	210	Freshman

=== 2022 other additions ===
Name	Pos.	Height	Weight	Year	Notes
Kingsley Suamataia	OL	6'6"	330	Freshman	Transfer from University of Oregon
Christopher Brooks	RB	6'1"	235	Senior	Transfer from University of California
Houston Heimuli	RB	5'11"	265	Senior	Transfer from Stanford University
Lisala Tai	OL	6'7"	336	Sophomore	Transfer from Snow College
Gabe Jeudy-Lally	DB	6'2"	185	Sophomore	Transfer from Vanderbilt University
Enoch Nawahine	RB	5'11"	195	Sophomore	Transfer from Utah State University
Sam Dawe	OL	6'3"	298	Freshman	Transfer from Idaho State University
Mory Bamba	DB	6'2"	190	Junior	Transfer from Tyler Junior College
Sione Veikoso	OL	6'7"	325	Freshman	Transfer from Arizona State University
Kyle Hester	TE	6'4"	250	Freshman	Transfer from University of New Mexico

=== 2022 departures ===
Name	Pos.	Height	Weight	Year	Notes
Jared Kapisi	DB	6'0"	195	Senior	Graduation
Uriah Leiataua	DL	6'4"	255	Senior	Graduation
Samson Nacua	WR	6'4"	195	Senior	Graduation
Tyler Allgeier	RB	5'11"	220	Sophomore	NFL Draft
Maguire Anderson	WR	6'0"	187	Freshman	Mission
Dylan Rollins	OL	6'6"	295	Freshman	Mission
Bentley Hanshaw	TE	6'5"	245	Freshman	Transfer
Viliami Tausinga	LB	6'2"	235	Freshman	Transfer
Rhett Reilly	QB	6'2"	180	Sophomore	Transfer
Javelle Brown	DB	6'1"	187	Sophomore	Transfer
Sione Finau	RB	5'11"	185	Sophomore	Transfer
Mitchell Price	DB	6'0"	195	Junior	Transfer
Brock Gunderson	OL	6'4"	290	Freshman	Transfer
Cooper McMullin	OL	6'6"	300	Freshman	Mission
Jacques Wilson	DB	5'11"	185	Junior	
Cade Parish	OL	6'5"	295	Freshman	
Jaylon Vickers	DB	5'10"	195	Sophomore	
James Empey	OL	6'4"	303	Junior	
Neil Pau'u	WR	6'4"	215	Junior	
Baylor Romney	QB	6'2"	195	Sophomore	
JT Gentry	OL	6'5"	304	Sophomore	
Jason Money	DB	6'1"	203	Junior	
Drew Jensen	LB	6'2"	215	Sophomore	
Keenan Ellis	DB	6'0"	181	Sophomore	
Tysen Lewis	OL	6'5"	290	Freshman	
Jacob Palu	DL	6'2"	319	Freshman	
Shamon Willis	DB	5'10"	180	Junior	
John Bosco	LB	6'2"	235	Freshman	
Chandler Bird	OL	6'1"	295	Freshman	
Theo Dawson	LB	6'0"	225	Sophomore	
Hunter Hill	OL	6'5"	285	Freshman	
Isaiah Herron	DB	6'1"	180	Junior	
Cade Hoke	LB	6'0"	220	Freshman	
Burke Parker	OL	6'4"	300	Freshman	
Mike Petty	DL	6'3"	240	Freshman	
Kade Pupunu	LB	6'3"	235	Sophomore	
Seth Willis	OL	6'5"	315	Sophomore	
Isaac Matua	LB	6'3"	220	Freshman	
Nick Nethercott	DB	6'3"	220	Freshman	
Ben Tuipulotu	LB	6'3"	230	Freshman	
Alex Muti	LB	6'3"	235	Freshman	

== Schedule ==
BYU hosted six home games, traveled to five different away games, and played at a neutral site game in Las Vegas against Notre Dame.

Date	Time	Opponent	Rank	Site	TV	Result	Attendance
September 3	2:00 p.m.	at South Florida	No. 25	Raymond James Stadium; Tampa, FL	ESPNU/ESPNews*	W 50–21	31,521
September 10	8:25 p.m.	No. 9 Baylor	No. 21	LaVell Edwards Stadium; Provo, UT	ESPN	W 26–20 ^{2OT}	63,470
September 17	1:30 p.m.	at No. 25 Oregon	No. 12	Autzen Stadium; Eugene, OR	FOX	L 20–41	54,463
September 24	8:15 p.m.	Wyoming	No. 19	LaVell Edwards Stadium; Provo, UT	ESPN2	W 38–24	60,092
September 29	6:00 p.m.	Utah State	No. 19	LaVell Edwards Stadium; Provo, UT (rivalry)	ESPN	W 38–26	59,417
October 8	5:30 p.m.	vs. Notre Dame	No. 16	Allegiant Stadium; Paradise, NV (Shamrock Series)	NBC	L 20–28	62,742
October 15	1:30 p.m.	Arkansas^{†}		LaVell Edwards Stadium; Provo, UT	ESPN	L 35–52	63,470
October 22	1:30 p.m.	at Liberty		Williams Stadium; Lynchburg, VA	ESPNU	L 14–41	24,012
October 28	6:00 p.m.	East Carolina		LaVell Edwards Stadium; Provo, UT	ESPN2	L 24–27	55,525
November 5	5:00 p.m.	at Boise State		Albertsons Stadium; Boise, ID	FS2	W 31–28	36,461
November 19	1:30 p.m.	Utah Tech		LaVell Edwards Stadium; Provo, UT	BYUtv/ESPN3	W 52–26	56,069
November 26	9:00 p.m.	at Stanford		Stanford Stadium; Stanford, CA	FS1	W 35–26	25,094
December 17	5:30 p.m.	vs. SMU		University Stadium; Albuquerque, NM (New Mexico Bowl)	ABC	W 24–23	22,209
^{†}Homecoming; Rankings from AP Poll (and CFP Rankings, after November 1) - Released prior to game; All times are in Mountain time

- Game moved to ESPNews at the end of the first quarter, shortly before 7:30 p.m. EDT.

== Game summaries ==
=== South Florida ===
BYU at USF

Team	1	2	3	4	Total
• No. 25/RV Cougars	28	10	9	3	50
Bulls	0	7	14	0	21

- Date: September 3
- Location: Raymond James Stadium
  Tampa, FL
- Game start: 6:37 p.m. EDT
- Elapsed time: 3:15
- Game attendance: 31,521
- Game weather: 85 °F (29 °C), Winds NW 7 mph; Cloudy; 2 1/2 weather delay from thunderstorms and lightning
- Referee: Kevin Mar • Umpire: Marlow Fitzgerald • Linesman: Bradford Edwards • Line judge: Scott Reilly • Back judge: Lyndon Nixon • Field judge: Randy Smith • Side judge: Jim Murphy • Center judge: Darren Winkley
- TV announcers (ESPNU/ESPNews): Ted Emrich, Barrett Brooks, and Ashley Stroehlein

Uniform combination: white helmets, white jersey w/ navy stripes, white pants w/ navy accents

Scoring summary

Quarter	Time	Drive			Team	Scoring information	Score	
Quarter	Time	Plays	Yards	TOP	Team	Scoring information	BYU	USF
1	14:49	1	75	0:11	BYU	Puka Nacua 75-yard touchdown run, Jake Oldroyd kick good	7	0
1	8:44	10	65	4:01	BYU	Puka Nacua 8-yard touchdown run, Jake Oldroyd kick good	14	0
1	7:59				BYU	Interception returned 33 yards for touchdown by Max Tooley, Jake Oldroyd kick good	21	0
1	4:00	6	82	2:43	BYU	Keanu Hill 21-yard touchdown reception from Jaren Hall, Jake Oldroyd kick good	28	0
2	7:19	8	65	3:30	BYU	Darren Holker 13-yard touchdown reception from Jaren Hall, Jake Oldroyd kick good	35	0
2	2:11	6	19	2:38	BYU	39-yard field goal by Jake Oldroyd	38	0
2	0:14	8	84	1:52	USF	Jaren Mangham 1-yard touchdown run, Spencer Shrader kick good	38	7
3	14:44				USF	Kickoff returned 89 yards for touchdown by Jimmy Horn Jr., Spencer Shrader kick good	38	14
3	7:39				BYU	Punt snap fumbled out of the back of the end zone.	40	14
3	5:32	4	76	2:00	BYU	Christopher Brooks 52-yard touchdown run, Jake Oldroyd kick good	47	14
3	2:23	6	43	2:59	USF	Brian Battie 9-yard touchdown run, Spencer Shrader kick good	47	21
4	10:29	11	55	6:54	BYU	37-yard field goal by Jake Oldroyd	50	21
"TOP" = time of possession. For other American football terms, see Glossary of American football.							50	21

Statistics	BYU	USF
First downs	27	12
Plays–yards	69–575	56–293
Rushes–yards	37–314, 3 TD's	26–121, 2 TD's
Passing yards	261	172
Passing: comp–att–int	25—32–1, 2 TD's	17–30–1
Turnovers		
Time of possession	32:52	23:52

Team	Category	Player	Statistics
BYU	Passing	Jaren Hall	25—32–1, 261 yards, 2 TD's
BYU	Rushing	Christopher Brooks	13 carries, 135 yards, 1 TD
BYU	Receiving	Chase Roberts	3 receptions, 41 yards
USF	Passing	Gerry Bohanon	17–30–1, 172 yards
USF	Rushing	Jaren Mangham	10 carries, 39 yards, 1 TD
USF	Receiving	Xavier Weaver	5 receptions, 113 yards

=== No. 9 Baylor ===
Baylor at BYU

Team	1	2	3	4	OT	2OT	Total
No. 9/8 Bears	0	6	7	7	0	0	20
• No. 21/25 Cougars	3	7	10	0	0	6	26

- Date: September 10
- Location: LaVell Edwards Stadium
  Provo, UT
- Game start: 8:25 p.m. MDT
- Elapsed time: 3:54
- Game attendance: 63,470
- Game weather: 69 °F (21 °C), Winds E 1 mph, Clear
- Referee: Derek Anderson • Umpire: Michael Henderson • Linesman: Doug Moore • Line judge: Quentin Givens • Back judge: Daniel Young • Field judge: Gabreil DeLeon • Side judge: Mark Graves • Center judge: Brian Also
- TV announcers (ESPN): Mark Jones, Robert Griffin III, and Quint Kessenich

Uniform combination: royal helmets, royal jersey w/ white stripes, royal pants w/ white accents

Scoring summary

Quarter	Time	Drive			Team	Scoring information	Score	
Quarter	Time	Plays	Yards	TOP	Team	Scoring information	BAY	BYU
1	10:29	11	65	3:29	BYU	27-yard field goal by Jake Oldroyd	0	3
2	1:37	13	68	6:14	BAY	Qualan Jones 1-yard touchdown run, Isaiah Hankins kick no good	6	3
2	0:02	8	75	1:35	BYU	Chase Roberts 20-yard touchdown reception from Jaren Hall, Jake Oldroyd kick good	6	10
3	10:53	9	77	4:02	BAY	Qualan Jones 7-yard touchdown run, Isaiah Hankins kick good	13	10
3	6:15	13	54	4:38	BYU	39-yard field goal by Jake Oldroyd	13	13
3	1:28	5	54	2:36	BYU	Jaren Hall 22-yard touchdown reception from Chase Roberts, Jake Oldroyd kick good	13	20
4	10:01	12	79	6:21	BAY	Ben Sims 4-yard touchdown reception from Blake Shapen, Isaiah Hankins kick good	20	20
2OT	0:00	4	25	0:00	BYU	Lopini Katoa 3-yard touchdown run, 2-point pass incomplete from Jaren Hall to Isaac Rex	20	26
"TOP" = time of possession. For other American football terms, see Glossary of American football.							20	26

Statistics	BAY	BYU
First downs	22	24
Plays–yards	80–289	73—366
Rushes–yards	52–152, 2 TD's	33–83, 1 TD
Passing yards	137	283
Passing: comp–att–int	18–28, 1 TD	24–40, 2 TD's
Turnovers		
Time of possession	34:15	25:45

Team	Category	Player	Statistics
BAY	Passing	Blake Shapen	18–28, 137 yards, 1 TD
BAY	Rushing	Craig Williams	17 carries, 68 yards
BAY	Receiving	Hal Presley	3 receptions, 31 yards
BYU	Passing	Jaren Hall	23–39, 261 yards, 1 TD
BYU	Rushing	Christopher Brooks	13 carries, 31 yards
BYU	Receiving	Chase Roberts	8 receptions, 122 yards, 1 TD

=== No. 25 Oregon ===
BYU at Oregon

Team	1	2	3	4	Total
No. 12/14 Cougars	0	7	0	13	20
• No. 25/24 Ducks	10	14	14	3	41

- Date: September 17
- Location: Autzen Stadium
  Eugene, OR
- Game start: 12:41 p.m. PDT
- Elapsed time: 3:19
- Game attendance: 54,463
- Game weather: 60 °F (16 °C), Winds W 5 mph, Clear
- Referee: Mark Duddy • Umpire: Mark Warner • Linesman: Harold Mitchell • Line judge: Tim Messuri • Back judge: David Ross • Field judge: Kevin Keiser • Side judge: Shane Anderson • Center judge: Christopher Wiggins
- TV announcers (Fox; Westwood One): Jason Benetti, Brock Huard, and Allison Williams (Fox)
  Sam Neidermann and Ryan Leaf (Westwood One)

Uniform combination: royal helmets, white jersey w/ royal stripes, white pants w/ royal accents

Scoring summary

Quarter	Time	Drive			Team	Scoring information	Score	
Quarter	Time	Plays	Yards	TOP	Team	Scoring information	BYU	ORE
1	10:21	4	64	2:02	ORE	Bo Nix 2-yard touchdown run, Camden Lewis kick good	0	7
1	4:26	7	39	4:18	ORE	28-yard field goal by Camden Lewis	0	10
2	14:53	10	75	4:33	BYU	Isaac Rex 23-yard touchdown reception from Jaren Hall, Jake Oldroyd kick good	7	10
2	11:44	8	75	3:09	ORE	Bo Nix 2-yard touchdown run, Camden Lewis kick good	7	17
2	0:24	13	79	5:33	ORE	Terrance Ferguson 15-yard touchdown reception from Bo Nix, Camden Lewis kick good	7	24
3	11:44	9	75	3:06	ORE	Bo Nix 6-yard touchdown run, Camden Lewis kick good	7	31
3	8:21	4	35	1:53	ORE	Terrance Ferguson 9-yard touchdown reception from Bo Nix, Camden Lewis kick good	7	38
4	14:05	7	55	2:44	BYU	Kody Epps 18-yard touchdown reception from Jaren Hall, Jake Oldroyd kick good	14	38
4	10:39	4	25	1:52	BYU	Christopher Brooks 2-yard touchdown run, 2-point pass from Jaren Hall thrown out of the end zone	20	38
4	2:16	12	68	8:23	ORE	25-yard field goal by Camden Lewis	20	41
"TOP" = time of possession. For other American football terms, see Glossary of American football.							20	41

Statistics	BYU	ORE
First downs	20	23
Plays–yards	65–366	64–439
Rushes–yards	24–61	44–212
Passing yards	305	227
Passing: comp–att–int	29–41, 2 TD's	14–20–1, 2 TD's
Turnovers		
Time of possession	26:49	33:11

Team	Category	Player	Statistics
BYU	Passing	Jaren Hall	29–41, 305 yards, 2 TD's
BYU	Rushing	Christopher Brooks	10 carries, 28 yards, 1 TD
BYU	Receiving	Chase Roberts	4 receptions, 60 yards
ORE	Passing	Bo Nix	13–18, 222 yards, 2 TD's
ORE	Rushing	Bucky Irving	14 carries, 97 yards
ORE	Receiving	Troy Franklin	3 receptions, 84 yards

=== Wyoming ===
Wyoming at BYU

Team	1	2	3	4	Total
Cowboys	3	7	0	14	24
• No. 19/23 Cougars	7	7	14	10	38

- Date: September 24
- Location: LaVell Edwards Stadium
  Provo, UT
- Game start: 8:25 p.m. MDT
- Elapsed time: 3:33
- Game attendance: 60,092
- Game weather: 67 °F (19 °C), Winds SW 4 mph, Clear
- Referee: Kevin Boitmann • Umpire: Apollo Martin • Linesman: Eric Carmouche • Line judge: David Young • Back judge: Joe Wetzel • Field judge: Ed Vinzant • Side judge: Steve Heiman • Center judge: Stacy Hardin
- TV announcers (ESPN2): Brian Custer, Dustin Fox, and Lauren Sisler

Uniform combination: white helmets, navy jersey w/ white stripes, navy pants w/ white accents

Scoring summary

Quarter	Time	Drive			Team	Scoring information	Score	
Quarter	Time	Plays	Yards	TOP	Team	Scoring information	WYO	BYU
1	4:26	10	57	3:55	WYO	28-yard field goal by John Hoyland	3	0
1	2:50	4	91	1:35	BYU	Christopher Brooks 6-yard touchdown run, Jake Oldroyd kick good	3	7
2	13:03	10	75	4:47	WYO	Wyatt Wieland 4-yard touchdown run, John Hoyland kick good	10	7
2	0:04	13	76	3:28	BYU	Brayden Cosper 4-yard touchdown reception from Jaren Hall, Jake Oldroyd kick good	10	14
3	7:51	9	83	5:07	BYU	Kody Epps 3-yard touchdown reception from Jaren Hall, Jake Oldroyd kick good	10	21
3	1:13	9	67	4:24	BYU	Keanu Hill 9-yard touchdown reception from Jaren Hall, Jake Oldroyd kick good	10	28
4	14:54	4	50	1:19	WYO	Treyton Welch 19-yard touchdown reception from Andrew Peasley, John Hoyland kick good	17	28
4	5:31	3	72	1:36	BYU	Keanu Hill 68-yard touchdown reception from Jaren Hall, Jake Oldroyd kick good	17	35
4	3:15	6	75	2:16	WYO	Joshua Cobbs 4-yard touchdown reception from Andrew Peasley, John Hoyland kick good	24	35
4	1:24	5	67	1:51	BYU	25-yard field goal by Justen Smith	24	38
"TOP" = time of possession. For other American football terms, see Glossary of American football.							24	38

Statistics	WYO	BYU
First downs	22	19
Plays–yards	61–278	63–525
Rushes–yards	34–124, 1 TD	30–188, 1 TD
Passing yards	154	337
Passing: comp–att–int	14–27, 2 TD's	26–33, 4 TD's
Turnovers		
Time of possession	29:37	30:23

Team	Category	Player	Statistics
WYO	Passing	Andrew Peasley	14–27, 154 yards, 2 TD's
WYO	Rushing	Titus Swen	20 carries, 78 yards
WYO	Receiving	Joshua Cobb	4 receptions, 64 yards, 1 TD
BYU	Passing	Jaren Hall	26–32, 332 yards, 4 TD's
BYU	Rushing	Miles Davis	13 carries, 131 yards
BYU	Receiving	Keanu Hill	5 receptions, 160 yards, 2 TD's

=== Utah State ===
Utah State at BYU

Team	1	2	3	4	Total
Aggies	7	10	3	6	26
• 'No. 19/20 Cougars	14	3	14	7	38

- Date: September 29
- Location: LaVell Edwards Stadium
  Provo, UT
- Game start: 6:05 p.m. MDT
- Elapsed time: 3:37
- Game attendance: 59,417
- Game weather: 80 °F (27 °C), Winds W 9 mph, Mostly Cloudy
- Referee: Christian Watson • Umpire: John Schindler • Linesman: Bret Bascue • Line judge: Justin Gragg • Back judge: Bobby Lynn • Field judge: Matt Binford • Side judge: Danny Hoeft • Center judge: Scott Johnson
- TV announcers (ESPN): Matt Barrie, Louis Riddick, and Harry Lyles Jr.

Uniform combination: royal helmets, royal jerseys w/ white stripes, white pants w/ royal accents

Scoring summary

Quarter	Time	Drive			Team	Scoring information	Score	
Quarter	Time	Plays	Yards	TOP	Team	Scoring information	USU	BYU
1	10:39	12	75	4:21	USU	Cooper Legas 7-yard touchdown run, Connor Coles kick good	7	0
1	9:56	2	65	0:34	BYU	Keanu Hill 31-yard touchdown reception from Jaren Hall, Jake Oldroyd kick good	7	7
1	8:35				BYU	Interception returned 34 yards for touchdown by Max Tooley, Jake Oldroyd kick good	7	14
2	9:34	7	-4	2:52	USU	50-yard field goal by Connor Coles	10	14
2	5:04	6	57	2:09	USU	Brian Cobbs 14-yard touchdown reception from Cooper Legas, Connor Coles kick good	17	14
2	2:32	8	47	2:32	BYU	45-yard field goal by Jake Oldroyd	17	17
3	12:19	6	70	2:34	BYU	Ethan Erickson 14-yard touchdown reception from Jaren Hall, Jake Oldroyd kick good	17	24
3	10:03	6	37	2:16	USU	33-yard field goal by Connor Coles	20	24
3	6:12	7	75	3:31	BYU	Kody Epps 8-yard touchdown reception from Jaren Hall, Jake Oldroyd kick good	20	31
4	8:18	6	44	3:04	BYU	Christopher Brooks 18-yard touchdown run, Jake Oldroyd kick good	20	38
4	1:09	6	80	2:11	USU	Brian Cobbs 27-yard touchdown reception from Cooper Legas, 2-point Terrell Vaugh run failed	26	38
"TOP" = time of possession. For other American football terms, see Glossary of American football.							26	38

Statistics	USU	BYU
First downs	24	20
Plays–yards	82–392	60–396
Rushes–yards	49–204, 1 TD	32–117, 1 TD
Passing yards	188	279
Passing: comp–att–int	19–32–2, 2 TD's	18–28, 3 TD's
Turnovers		
Time of possession	29:26	26:39

Team	Category	Player	Statistics
USU	Passing	Cooper Legas	19–31–2, 2 TD's
USU	Rushing	Calvin Tyler Jr.	18 carries, 104 yards
USU	Receiving	Brian Cobbs	10 receptions, 96 yards, 2 TD's
BYU	Passing	Jaren Hall	17–27, 3 TD's
BYU	Rushing	Christopher Brooks	11 carries, 90 yards, 1 TD
BYU	Receiving	Kody Epps	5 receptions, 86 yards, 1 TD

=== Notre Dame ===
BYU vs. Notre Dame

Team	1	2	3	4	Total
No. 16/16 Cougars	6	0	7	7	20
• Fighting Irish	3	15	7	3	28

- Date: October 8
- Location: Allegiant Stadium
  Paradise, NV
- Game start: 4:36 p.m. PDT
- Elapsed time: 2:59
- Game attendance: 62,742
- Game weather: 72 °F (22 °C), Indoors
- Referee: Stuart Mullins • Umpire: Johnnie Forte • Linesman: Steve Clein • Line judge: Johnnie Forte • Back judge: Ken Bushey • Field judge: Hans Wittelsberger • Side judge: Milton Britton • Center judge: Scott Held
- TV announcers (NBC): Jac Collinsworth, Jason Garrett, and Zora Stephenson

Uniform combination: royal helmets featuring Stretch Y w/ black gradient, black jerseys w/ royal stripes, black pants w/ royal accents

Scoring summary

Quarter	Time	Drive			Team	Scoring information	Score	
Quarter	Time	Plays	Yards	TOP	Team	Scoring information	BYU	ND
1	11:25	8	36	3:26	ND	26-yard field goal by Blake Grupe	0	3
1	4:32	7	26	3:49	BYU	Kody Epps 2-yard touchdown reception from Jaren Hall, Justen Smith kick no good	6	3
2	14:19	10	75	5:13	ND	Michael Mayer 24-yard touchdown reception from Drew Pyne, Blake Grupe kick good	6	10
2	6:50	1	-4	0:06	ND	Jaren Hall strip-sacked, fumble recovered by BYU in the endzone	6	12
2	1:03	10	79	5:42	ND	Jayden Thomas 30-yard touchdown reception from Drew Pyne, kick g	6	18
3	8:05	11	75	6:55	ND	Michael Mayer 19-yard touchdown reception from Drew Pyne, Blake Grupe kick good	6	25
3	5:27	5	75	2:38	BYU	Kody Epps 53-yard touchdown reception from Jaren Hall, Justen Smith kick good	13	25
4	14:18	10	87	4:41	BYU	Christopher Brooks 28-yard touchdown run, Justen Smith kick good	20	25
4	6:07	8	62	4:47	ND	20-yard field goal by Blake Grupe	20	28
"TOP" = time of possession. For other American football terms, see Glossary of American football.							20	28

Statistics	BYU	ND
First downs	13	24
Plays–yards	46–276	73–496
Rushes–yards	29–156	45–234
Passing yards	120	262
Passing: comp–att–int	9–17–1	22–28–1
Turnovers		
Time of possession	19:05	40:55

Team	Category	Player	Statistics
BYU	Passing	Jaren Hall	9–17, 120 yards, 2 TD, 1 INT
BYU	Rushing	Christopher Brooks	14 carries, 90 yards, 1 TD
BYU	Receiving	Kody Epps	4 receptions, 100 yards, 2 TD
ND	Passing	Drew Pyne	22–28, 262 yards, 3 TD, 1 INT
ND	Rushing	Audric Estimé	14 carries, 97 yards
ND	Receiving	Michael Mayer	11 receptions, 118 yards, 2 TD

=== Arkansas ===
Arkansas at BYU

Team	1	2	3	4	Total
• Razorbacks	7	24	14	7	52
Cougars	13	8	14	0	35

- Date: October 15
- Location: LaVell Edwards Stadium
  Provo, UT
- Game start: 1:35 p.m. MDT
- Elapsed time: 3:31
- Game attendance: 63,470
- Game weather: 68 °F (20 °C), Winds E 5 mph, Clear
- Referee: David Smith • Umpire: Paul Myers • Linesman: Johnny Crawford • Line judge: Michael Taylor • Back judge: Paul Schardein • Field judge: Raymond Tate III • Side judge: Bryan Murphy • Center judge: Eddie Allbritton
- TV announcers (ESPN): Dave Pasch, Dusty Dvoracek, and Tom Luginbill

Uniform combination: royal helmets w/ dual custom design (Wasatch range/cougar face), white jerseys w/ royal stripes, white pants w/ royal accents

Scoring summary

Quarter	Time	Drive			Team	Scoring information	Score	
Quarter	Time	Plays	Yards	TOP	Team	Scoring information	ARK	BYU
1	5:39	10	82	4:57	BYU	Isaac Rex 4-yard touchdown reception from Jaren Hall, Justen Smith kick good	0	7
1	2:37	9	75	3:02	ARK	Raheim Sanders 15-yard touchdown run, Cam Little kick good	7	7
1	1:11	4	75	1:26	BYU	Kody Epps 21-yard touchdown reception from Jaren Hall, Justen Smith kick no good	7	13
2	12:19	10	75	3:52	ARK	Trey Knox 6-yard touchdown reception from KJ Jefferson, Cam Little kick good	14	13
2	9:48	7	75	2:31	BYU	Puka Nacua 5-yard touchdown run, 2-point pass from Jaren Hall to Keanu Hill good	14	21
2	6:46	10	59	3:02	ARK	34-yard field goal by Cam Little	17	21
2	3:39	4	34	1:39	ARK	Matt Landers 4-yard touchdown reception from KJ Jefferson, Cam Little kick good	24	21
2	0:40	7	68	1:42	ARK	Rashod Dubinion 15-yard touchdown reception from KJ Jefferson, Cam Little kick good	31	21
3	9:53	10	75	5:07	BYU	Puka Nacua 3-yard touchdown run, Jake Oldroyd kick good	31	28
3	9:20	2	75	0:33	ARK	Matt Landers 39-yard touchdown reception from KJ Jefferson, Cam Little kick good	38	28
3	5:11	10	75	4:09	BYU	Puka Nacua 33-yard touchdown reception from Jaren Hall, Jake Oldroyd kick good	38	35
3	1:13	12	75	3:58	ARK	Matt Landers 5-yard touchdown reception from KJ Jefferson, Cam Little kick good	45	35
4	14:25	2	68	0:29	ARK	Raheim Sanders 64-yard touchdown run, Cam Little kick good	52	35
"TOP" = time of possession. For other American football terms, see Glossary of American football.							52	35

Statistics	ARK	BYU
First downs	34	27
Plays–yards	82–644	71–471
Rushes–yards	42–277, 2 TD's	30–115
Passing yards	367	356
Passing: comp–att–int	29–40, 5 TD's	26–41–1, 3 TD's
Turnovers		
Time of possession	31:13	28:47

Team	Category	Player	Statistics
ARK	Passing	KJ Jefferson	29–40, 367 yards, 5 TD's
ARK	Rushing	Raheim Sanders	15 carries, 175 yards, 2 TD's
ARK	Receiving	Matt Landers	8 receptions, 99 yards, 3 TD's
BYU	Passing	Jaren Hall	26–41–1, 356 yards, 3 TD's
BYU	Rushing	Christopher Brooks	10 carries, 53 yards
BYU	Receiving	Puka Nacua	8 receptions, 141 yards, 1 TD

=== Liberty ===
BYU at Liberty

Team	1	2	3	4	Total
Cougars	14	0	0	0	14
• Flames	3	17	14	7	41

- Date: October 22
- Location: Williams Stadium
  Lynchburg, VA
- Game start: 3:30 p.m. EDT
- Elapsed time: 3:15
- Game attendance: 24,012
- Game weather: 71 °F (22 °C), Winds S 3 mph, Sunny
- Referee: Mike Cuttone • Umpire: Ian Malepeai • Linesman: Greg Downum • Line judge: Carlos Owens • Back judge: Michael Aaronian • Field judge: Trey Castleberry • Side judge: Richard Corona • Center judge: Krystle Apellaniz
- TV announcers (ESPNU): Kevin Brown and Hutson Mason

Uniform combination: white helmets, white jersey w/ royal stripes, royal pants w/ white accents

Scoring summary

Quarter	Time	Drive			Team	Scoring information	Score	
Quarter	Time	Plays	Yards	TOP	Team	Scoring information	BYU	LIB
1	7:29	11	84	6:05	LIB	22-yard field goal by Nick Brown	0	3
1	4:14	6	76	3:07	BYU	Puka Nacua 46-yard touchdown reception from Jaren Hall, Jake Oldroyd kick good	7	3
1	2:41	2	27	0:43	BYU	Isaac Rex 20-yard touchdown reception from Jaren Hall, Jake Oldroyd kick good	14	3
2	13:59	11	75	3:42	LIB	Shedro Louis 3-yard touchdown run, Nick Brown kick good	14	10
2	5:06	13	80	6:57	LIB	Austin Henderson 5-yard touchdown reception from Johnathan Bennett, Nick Brown kick good	14	17
2	0:05	8	43	1:10	LIB	37-yard field goal by Nick Brown	14	20
3	9:16	12	75	5:44	LIB	Shedro Louis 6-yard touchdown run, Nick Brown kick good	14	27
3	6:54	1	80	0:16	LIB	Dae Dae Hunter 80-yard touchdown run, Nick Brown kick good	14	34
4	10:36	8	53	4:40	LIB	CJ Daniels 25-yard touchdown reception from Johnathan Bennett, Nick Brown kick good	14	41
"TOP" = time of possession. For other American football terms, see Glossary of American football.							14	41

Statistics	BYU	LIB
First downs	12	28
Plays–yards	50–258	77–547
Rushes–yards	16–71	48–300
Passing yards	187	247
Passing: comp–att–int	16–34, 2 TD's	24–29–1, 2 TD's
Turnovers		
Time of possession	20:47	39:13

Team	Category	Player	Statistics
BYU	Passing	Jaren Hall	16–34, 187 yards, 2 TD's
BYU	Rushing	Christopher Brooks	3 carries, 26 yards
BYU	Receiving	Puka Nacua	7 receptions, 114 yards, 1 TD
LIB	Passing	Johnathan Bennett	24–29–1, 247 yards, 1 TD
LIB	Rushing	Dae Dae Hunter	23 carries, 213 yards, 1 TD
LIB	Receiving	Noah Frith	4 receptions, 70 yards

=== East Carolina ===
East Carolina at BYU

Team	1	2	3	4	Total
• Pirates	7	10	7	3	27
Cougars	3	14	7	0	24

- Date: October 28
- Location: LaVell Edwards Stadium
  Provo, UT
- Game start: 6:05 p.m. MDT
- Elapsed time: 3:16
- Game attendance: 55,525
- Game weather: 53 °F (12 °C), Winds SE 6 mph, Clear
- Referee: Edwin Lee • Umpire: Hilbert Byers • Linesman: Baron Ballester • Line judge: Lance Thompson • Back judge: Nathan Umberger • Field judge: Sean McKinnie • Side judge: Matt Waldron • Center judge: Mark Mobra
- TV announcers (ESPN2): Roy Philpott, Andre Ware, and Paul Carcaterra

Uniform combination: white helmets, royal jerseys w/ white stripes, white pants w/ royal accents

Scoring summary

Quarter	Time	Drive			Team	Scoring information	Score	
Quarter	Time	Plays	Yards	TOP	Team	Scoring information	ECU	BYU
1	8:23	9	41	4:21	BYU	36-yard field goal by Jake Oldroyd	0	3
1	6:29	6	75	1:54	ECU	Keaton Mitchell 31-yard touchdown run, Andrew Conrad kick good	7	3
2	12:56	10	92	5:56	BYU	Lopini Katoa 24-yard touchdown run, Jake Oldroyd kick good	7	10
2	9:15	8	69	3:41	ECU	23-yard field goal by Andrew Conrad	10	10
2	6:01	8	79	3:14	BYU	Puka Nacua 30-yard touchdown reception from Jaren Hall, Jake Oldroyd kick good	10	17
2	2:42	7	68	3:19	ECU	Holton Ahlers 1-yard touchdown run, Andrew Conrad kick good	17	17
3	9:58	11	75	5:02	BYU	Chase Roberts 2-yard touchdown reception from Jaren Hall, Jake Oldroyd kick good	17	24
3	7:07	6	75	2:51	ECU	Holton Ahlers 4-yard touchdown run, Andrew Conrad kick good	24	24
4	0:00	10	46	2:26	ECU	33-yard field goal by Andrew Conrad	27	24
"TOP" = time of possession. For other American football terms, see Glossary of American football.							27	24

Statistics	ECU	BYU
First downs	20	22
Plays–yards	58–424	67–388
Rushes–yards	36–227	42–244
Passing yards	197	144
Passing: comp–att–int	15–22–0	18–25–0
Turnovers		
Time of possession	26:04	33:56

Team	Category	Player	Statistics
ECU	Passing	Holton Ahlers	15–22, 197 yards
ECU	Rushing	Keaton Mitchell	21 carries, 176 yards, 1 TD
ECU	Receiving	Isaiah Winstead	5 receptions, 63 yards
BYU	Passing	Jaren Hall	18–25, 144 yards, 2 TD's
BYU	Rushing	Lopini Katoa	20 carries, 116 yards, 1 TD
BYU	Receiving	Puka Nacua	7 receptions, 79 yards, 1 TD

=== Boise State ===
BYU at Boise State

Team	1	2	3	4	Total
• Cougars	7	0	10	14	31
Broncos	7	0	7	14	28

- Date: November 5
- Location: Albertsons Stadium
  Boise, ID
- Game start: 5:05 p.m. MDT
- Elapsed time: 3:13
- Game attendance: 36,461
- Game weather: 45 °F (7 °C), Winds NW 10 mph, Cloudy
- Referee: Derek Anderson • Umpire: Michael Henderson • Linesman: Doug Moore • Line judge: Quentin Givens • Back judge: Daniel Young • Field judge: Gabriel DeLeon • Side judge: Mark Graves • Center judge: Brian Alos
- TV announcers (FS2): Dan Hellie and Petros Papadakis

Uniform combination: white helmets, white jerseys w/ royal stripes, white pants w/ royal accents

Scoring summary

Quarter	Time	Drive			Team	Scoring information	Score	
Quarter	Time	Plays	Yards	TOP	Team	Scoring information	BYU	BSU
1	8:48	12	75	6:12	BYU	Jaren Hall 3-yard touchdown run, Jake Oldroyd kick good	7	0
1	0:36	6	67	2:53	BSU	Latrell Caples 16-yard touchdown reception from Taylen Green, Jonah Dalmas kick good	7	7
3	10:27	10	71	4:23	BSU	Eric McAlister 9-yard touchdown reception from Taylen Green, Jonah Dalmas kick good	7	14
3	6:26	8	66	3:59	BYU	25-yard field goal by Jake Oldroyd	10	14
3	0:25	7	83	2:36	BYU	Puka Nacua 24-yard touchdown reception from Jaren Hall, Jake Oldroyd kick good	17	14
4	9:45	12	78	5:35	BSU	George Holani 1-yard touchdown run, Jonah Dalmas kick good	17	21
4	8:12	4	64	1:29	BYU	Hinckley Ropati 48-yard touchdown reception from Jaren Hall, Jake Oldroyd kick good	24	21
4	6:28	4	65	1:44	BSU	George Holani 11-yard touchdown run, Jonah Dalmas kick good	24	28
4	1:46	9	75	4:42	BYU	Puka Nacua 6-yard touchdown reception from Jaren Hall, Jake Oldroyd kick good	31	28
"TOP" = time of possession. For other American football terms, see Glossary of American football.							31	28

Statistics	BYU	BSU
First downs	27	16
Plays–yards	74–532	53–324
Rushes–yards	32–155	30–104
Passing yards	377	220
Passing: comp–att–int	29–42–2, 3 TD's	17–20, 2 TD's
Turnovers		
Time of possession	36:01	23:59

Team	Category	Player	Statistics
BYU	Passing	Jaren Hall	29–42–2, 377 yards, 3 TD's
BYU	Rushing	Jaren Hall	12 carries, 82 yards, 1 TD
BYU	Receiving	Puka Nacua	14 receptions, 157 yards, 2 TD's
BSU	Passing	Taylen Green	17–23, 220 yards, 2 TD's
BSU	Rushing	George Holani	20 carries, 73 yards, 2 TD's
BSU	Receiving	Latrell Caples	5 receptions, 81 yards, 1 TD

=== Utah Tech ===
Utah Tech at BYU

Team	1	2	3	4	Total
Trailblazers	6	14	0	6	26
• Cougars	0	28	7	17	52

- Date: November 19
- Location: LaVell Edwards Stadium
  Provo, UT
- Game start: 1:35 p.m. MDT
- Elapsed time: 3:36
- Game attendance: 56,069
- Game weather: 32 °F (0 °C), Winds SE 6 mph, Sunny
- Referee: Jon Noli • Umpire: Rod Tucker • Linesman: Jason Moore • Line judge: John Kilmer • Back judge: Dave Baldwin • Field judge: Tito Smith • Side judge: Duane Moku • Center judge: Edgar Reed
- TV announcers (BYUtv/ESPN3): Dave McCann, Blaine Fowler, and Jarom Jordan

Uniform combination: white helmets, royal jerseys w/ white stripes, royal pants w/ white accents

Scoring summary

Quarter	Time	Drive			Team	Scoring information	Score	
Quarter	Time	Plays	Yards	TOP	Team	Scoring information	ECU	BYU
1	8:47	6	60	2:54	UTU	47-yard field goal by Connor Brooksby	3	0
1	7:12	7	30	1:20	UTU	21-yard field goal by Connor Brooksby	6	0
2	13:45	4	55	2:03	BYU	Keanu Hill 30-yard touchdown reception from Jaren Hall, Jake Oldroyd kick good	6	7
2	10:07	3	80	0:22	UTU	Deven Osborne 80-yard touchdown reception from Victor Gabalis, Connor Brooksby kick good	13	7
2	8:53	3	82	1:09	BYU	Chase Roberts 59-yard touchdown reception from Jaren Hall, Jake Oldroyd kick good	13	14
2	5:17	10	75	3:36	UTU	Joey Hobert 9-yard touchdown reception from Victor Gabalis, Connor Brooksby kick good	20	14
2	3:15	4	55	1:54	BYU	Keanu Hill 45-yard touchdown reception from Jaren Hall, Jake Oldroyd kick good	20	21
2	0:25	10	84	2:17	BYU	Keanu Hill 4-yard touchdown reception from Jaren Hall, Jake Oldroyd kick good	20	28
3	5:38	8	55	3:41	BYU	Jaren Hall 10-yard touchdown run, Jake Oldroyd kick good	20	35
4	10:15	3	58	0:57	BYU	Isaac Rex 32-yard touchdown reception from Jaren Hall, Jake Oldroyd kick good	20	42
4	3:39	10	46	5:10	BYU	32-yard field goal by Jake Oldroyd	20	45
4	1:49	6	75	1:50	UTU	Joey Hobert 18-yard touchdown reception from Victor Gabalis, 2-point pass by Victor Gabalis thrown out of the end zone	26	45
4	0:47	4	39	1:01	BYU	Terence Fall 25-yard touchdown run, Cash Peterman kick good	26	52
"TOP" = time of possession. For other American football terms, see Glossary of American football.							26	52

Statistics	UTU	BYU
First downs	18	30
Plays–yards	71–420	76–676
Rushes–yards	21–80	41–220
Passing yards	340	456
Passing: comp–att–int	25–50–1, 3 TD's	23–25–1, 5 TD's
Turnovers		
Time of possession	27:49	32:11

Team	Category	Player	Statistics
UTU	Passing	Victor Gabalis	25–50–1, 340 yards, 1 TD
UTU	Rushing	Quali Conley	18 carries, 61 yards
UTU	Receiving	Deven Osborne	3 receptions, 138 yards, 1 TD
BYU	Passing	Jaren Hall	23–25–1, 456 yards, 5 TD's
BYU	Rushing	Christopher Brooks	12 carries, 102 yards
BYU	Receiving	Keanu Hill	6 receptions, 137 yards, 3 TD's

=== Stanford ===
BYU at Stanford

Team	1	2	3	4	Total
• Cougars	14	14	0	7	35
Cardinal	3	9	0	14	26

- Date: November 26
- Location: Stanford Stadium
  Stanford, CA
- Game start: 8:10 p.m. PDT
- Elapsed time: 3:11
- Game attendance: 25,094
- Game weather: 54 °F (12 °C), Winds NW 0 mph, Clear
- Referee: Michael Vandervelde • Umpire: Robert Richeson • Linesman: John Braun • Line judge: Darren Deckard • Back judge: Brian Ernest • Field judge: Robert Asel • Side judge: Fulton Carson • Center judge: Chris Tallent
- TV announcers (FS1): Alex Faust and Petros Papadakis

Uniform combination: royal helmets, white jerseys w/ royal stripes, royal pants w/ white accents

Scoring summary

Quarter	Time	Drive			Team	Scoring information	Score	
Quarter	Time	Plays	Yards	TOP	Team	Scoring information	BYU	STAN
1	11:48	7	75	3:12	BYU	Jaren Hall 19-yard touchdown run, Jake Oldroyd kick good	7	0
1	8:26	10	49	3:19	STAN	34-yard field goal by Joshua Karty	7	3
1	5:29	7	75	2:57	BYU	Hinckley Ropati 43-yard touchdown run, Jake Oldroyd kick good	14	3
2	13:43	5	76	2:43	BYU	Isaac Rex 43-yard touchdown reception from Jaren Hall, Jake Oldroyd kick good	21	3
2	7:41	11	75	5:57	STAN	Mitch Leigber 1-yard touchdown run, Joshua Karty kick no good	21	9
2	1:50	11	73	5:47	BYU	Isaac Rex 1-yard touchdown reception from Jaren Hall, Jake Oldroyd kick good	28	9
2	0:00	11	38	1:45	STAN	54-yard field goal by Joshua Karty	28	12
4	12:48	10	87	5:28	BYU	Puka Nacua 25-yard touchdown run, Jake Oldroyd kick good	35	12
4	9:18	8	75	3:30	STAN	Ashton Daniels 43-yard touchdown run, 2-point run by Benjamin Yurosek good	35	20
4	4:39	7	75	2:59	STAN	Brycen Tremayne 7-yard touchdown reception from Tanner McKee, 2-point run by Ryan Sanborn failed	35	26
"TOP" = time of possession. For other American football terms, see Glossary of American football.							35	26

Statistics	BYU	STAN
First downs	26	20
Plays–yards	62–451	61–371
Rushes–yards	50–358	19–53
Passing yards	93	318
Passing: comp–att–int	7–12, 2 TD's	32–42, 1 TD
Turnovers		
Time of possession	32:19	27:41

Team	Category	Player	Statistics
BYU	Passing	Jaren Hall	7–11, 93 yards, 2 TD's
BYU	Rushing	Christopher Brooks	23 carries, 164 yards
BYU	Receiving	Isaac Rex	2 receptions, 44 yards, 2 TD's
STAN	Passing	Tanner McKee	31–40, 313 yards, 1 TD
STAN	Rushing	Mitch Leigber	12 carries, 40 yards, 1 TD
STAN	Receiving	Brycen Tremayne	11 receptions, 130 yards, 1 TD

=== New Mexico Bowl: SMU ===
SMU vs. BYU

Team	1	2	3	4	Total
Mustangs	10	0	0	13	23
• Cougars	7	3	14	0	24

- Date: December 17
- Location: University Stadium
  Albuquerque, NM
- Game start: 5:37 p.m. MDT
- Elapsed time: 3:19
- Game attendance: 22,209
- Game weather: 34 °F (1 °C), Winds SE 5 mph, Clear
- Referee: Ted Pitts • Umpire: Trent Crawford • Linesman: Brent Eubanks • Line judge: Travis Muhammad • Back judge: Jimmy Colwell • Field judge: Clay Brownlee • Side judge: Carl Brinkley • Center judge: Anthony Hayes
- TV announcers (ABC; ESPN Radio; ESPN Deportes): Tom Hart, Brock Osweiler, and Taylor McGregor (ABC)
  Jay Alter and Dave Steckel (ESPN Radio)
  Kenneth Garay and Pablo Viruega (ESPN Deportes)

Uniform combination: royal helmets featuring Sailor Cougar w/ black gradient, black jerseys w/ royal stripes, black pants w/ royal accents

Scoring summary

Quarter	Time	Drive			Team	Scoring information	Score	
Quarter	Time	Plays	Yards	TOP	Team	Scoring information	SMU	BYU
1	12:01	11	57	2:59	SMU	35-yard field goal by Collin Rogers	3	0
1	6:09	11	75	5:45	BYU	Sol-Jay Maiava-Peters 1-yard touchdown run, Jake Oldroyd kick good	3	7
1	2:16	12	75	3:53	SMU	Roderick Daniels, Jr. 9-yard touchdown reception from Tanner Mordecai, Collin Rogers kick good	10	7
2	3:34	14	66	7:11	BYU	31-yard field goal by Jake Oldroyd	10	10
3	8:17				BYU	Interception returned 70 yards for touchdown by Ben Bywater, Jake Oldroyd kick good	10	17
3	1:22	9	82	5:42	BYU	Christopher Brooks 22-yard touchdown run, Jake Oldroyd kick good	10	24
4	12:39	11	75	3:42	SMU	Tyler Lavine 3-yard touchdown run, Collin Rogers kick good	17	24
4	0:08	14	88	2:53	SMU	Jordan Kerley 12-yard touchdown reception from Tanner Mordecai, 2-point run by Tanner Mordecai failed	23	24
"TOP" = time of possession. For other American football terms, see Glossary of American football.							23	24

Statistics	SMU	BYU
First downs	28	16
Plays–yards	87–389	54–256
Rushes–yards	50–171	42–209
Passing yards	218	47
Passing: comp–att–int	27–37–1	7–12–1
Turnovers		
Time of possession	28:25	31:35

Team	Category	Player	Statistics
SMU	Passing	Tanner Mordecai	27–37–1, 218 yards, 2 TD's
SMU	Rushing	Tyler Lavine	23 carries, 91 yards, 1 TD
SMU	Receiving	Kelvontay Dixon	6 receptions, 60 yards
BYU	Passing	Sol-Jay Maiava-Peters	7–12–1, 47 yards
BYU	Rushing	Sol-Jay Maiava-Peters	14 carries, 96 yards, 1 TD
BYU	Receiving	Isaac Rex	1 reception, 27 yards

== Rankings ==
Ranking movements Legend: ██ Increase in ranking ██ Decrease in ranking — = Not ranked RV = Received votes
	Week															
Poll	Pre	1	2	3	4	5	6	7	8	9	10	11	12	13	14	Final
AP	25	21	12	19	19	16	RV	—	—	—	—	—	—	—	—	—
Coaches	RV	25	14	23	20	16	RV	—	—	—	—	—	—	—	—	RV
CFP	Not released									—	—	—	—	—	—	Not released

== NuSkin BYU Sports Network ==
The NuSkin BYU Sports Network is owned and operated by BYU Radio and features the talents of Greg Wrubell (play-by-play), Riley Nelson (analyst), Mitchell Juergens (reporter/sideline analyst), and Jason Shepherd (host) for the third consecutive year, with Ben Bagley subbing in for Jason Shepherd when he has women's soccer broadcasts. The network is in charge of producing and broadcasting all BYU Football pre and post game shows as well as coaches shows and live broadcasts.

Affiliates

- BYU Radio – Flagship Station Nationwide (Dish Network 980, Sirius XM 143, KBYU 89.1 FM HD 2, TuneIn radio, and byuradio.org)
- KSL 102.7 FM and 1160 a.m. – (Salt Lake City / Provo, Utah and ksl.com)
- KSNA – Blackfoot / Idaho Falls / Pocatello / Rexburg, Idaho (games)
- KSPZ – Blackfoot / Idaho Falls / Pocatello / Rexburg, Idaho (coaches' shows)
- KMXD – Monroe / Manti, Utah
- KSVC – Richfield / Manti, Utah
- KDXU – St. George, Utah

== Personnel ==
=== Coaching staff ===
Name	Position
Kalani Sitake	Head coach
Ed Lamb	Assistant head coach/special teams/safeties coach
Aaron Roderick	Offensive coordinator/quarterbacks coach
Darrell Funk	Offensive line coach
Fesi Sitake	Passing game coordinator/wide receivers coach
Steve Clark	Tight end coach
Ilaisa Tuiaki	Defensive coordinator/interior defensive line coach
Preston Hadley	Defensive ends/hybrids coach
Jernaro Gilford	Cornerbacks coach
Harvey Unga	Running backs coach
Kevin Clune	Linebackers coach

=== Roster ===
2022 BYU Cougars football team roster
Players
Coaches
Offense

Pos.	#	Name	Class
QB	17	Jacob Conover	Fr
QB	15	Nick Billoups	Fr
QB	11	Cade Fennegan	Fr
QB	3	Jaren Hall	Jr
QB	10	Sol-Jay Maiava-Peters	Fr
OL	74	Campbell Barrington	So
OL	56	Clark Barrington	Jr
OL	75	Sam Dawe	Fr
OL	68	Peter Falaniko	Fr
OL	71	Blake Freeland	Jr
OL	77	Donovan Hanna	Fr
OL	64	Brayden Keim	So
OL	76	Harris LaChance	So
OL	60	Tyler Little	So
OL	66	Sonny Makasini	Fr
OL	61	Trevin Ostler	Fr
OL	70	Connor Pay	So
OL	73	Vae Soifua	Fr
OL	78	Kingsley Suamataia	Fr
OL	59	Lisala Tai	Jr
OL	65	Talin Togiai	Fr
OL	52	Joe Tukuafu	Sr
OL	72	Sione Veikoso	Fr
OL	79	Ben Ward	So
RB	2	Christopher Brooks	Sr
RB	19	Miles Davis	Fr
RB	22	Mason Fakahua	Fr
RB	35	Houston Heimuli	Sr
RB	4	Lopini Katoa	Sr
RB	21	Jackson McChesney	Fr
RB	32	Enoch Nawahine	Fr
RB	7	Hinckley Ropati	So
RB	26	Beau Robinson	Fr
TE	97	Ethan Erickson	Fr
TE	47	Kyle Hester	Fr
TE	5	Dallin Holker	Jr
TE	80	Lane Lunt	Sr
TE	85	Anthony Olsen	Fr
TE	44	Samisoni Peaua	Fr
TE	83	Isaac Rex	So
TE	13	Masen Wake	Jr
TE	96	Carter Wheat	Fr
WR	20	Brayden Cosper	So
WR	0	Kody Epps	Fr
WR	88	Terence Fall	Fr
WR	36	Talmage Gunther	So
WR	30	Kyson Hall	Fr
WR	86	Dom Henry	Fr
WR	1	Keanu Hill	So
WR	82	Parker Kingston	Fr
WR	89	Kade Moore	Fr
WR	12	Puka Nacua	Jr
WR	23	Hobbs Nyberg	So
WR	38	Preston Rex	Fr
WR	27	Chase Roberts	Fr
WR	18	Gunner Romney	Sr
WR	28	Tanner Wall	Fr

Defense

Pos.	#	Name	Class
DB	25	Talan Alfrey	Fr
DB	35	Zion Allen	Fr
DB	19	Mory Bamba	Jr
DB	20	Jacob Boren	Jr
DB	4	Caleb Christensen	Fr
DB	17	Matthew Criddle	Sr
DB	23	Chika Ebunoha	Fr
DB	33	Nathaniel Gillis	Fr
DB	16	Isaiah Glasker	Fr
DB	29	Korbyn Green	Fr
DB	22	Ammon Hannemann	So
DB	1	Micah Harper	Fr
DB	18	Kaleb Hayes	Sr
DB	16	Chris Jackson	Sr
DB	11	Gabe Jeudy-Lally	So
DB	36	Evan Johnson	Fr
DB	21	Dean Jones	Fr
DB	15	Carter Krupp	Fr
DB	28	Hayden Livingston	Jr
DB	5	D'Angelo Mandell	Sr
DB	12	Malik Moore	Sr
DB	30	Quenton Rice	Fr
DB	0	Jakob Robinson	So
DB	26	Ethan Slade	Fr
DB	7	George Udo	Jr
DL	92	Tyler Batty	So
DL	55	Lorenzo Fauatea	Sr
DL	97	Hunter Greer	Fr
DL	95	Caden Haws	So
DL	53	Fisher Jackson	So
DL	57	Josh Larsen	Fr
DL	59	Logan Lutui	So
DL	93	Blake Mangelson	Fr
DL	62	Atunaisa Mahe	Jr
DL	96	Bruce Mitchell	Fr
DL	58	Aisea Moa	Fr
DL	94	John Nelson	Fr
DL	50	Isaiah Perez	Fr
DL	99	Alema Pilimai	Jr
DL	90	Joshua Singh	Fr
DL	98	Gabe Summers	Jr
DL	51	Alden Tofa	Sr
DL	91	Earl Tuioti-Mariner	Sr
LB	3	Chaz Ah You	Sr
LB	2	Ben Bywater	So
LB	44	Michael Daley	Fr
LB	56	Logan Fano	Fr
LB	27	Tavita Gagnier	So
LB	13	Jackson Kaufusi	Jr
LB	41	Keenan Pili	Jr
LB	46	Logan Pili	Fr
LB	10	Morgan Pyper	Jr
LB	32	Tate Romney	Fr
LB	48	Bodie Schoonover	Fr
LB	45	Pepe Tanuvasa	Sr
LB	31	Max Tooley	Jr
LB	49	Payton Wilgar	Jr
LB	34	Josh Wilson	So
LB	43	Micah Wilson	Fr

Special teams

Pos.	#	Name	Class
DS	87	Britton Hogan	Jr
DS	84	Austin Riggs	So
DS	54	Dalton Riggs	Fr
P	24	Ryan Rehkow	So
K	99	Cash Peterman	So
K	39	Jake Oldroyd	Jr
K	37	Justen Smith	Fr

Head coach

- Kalani Sitake (BYU)

Coordinators/assistant coaches

- Ed Lamb (BYU)
  Assistant head coach, special teams, safeties
- Aaron Roderick (BYU)
  Offensive coordinator/quarterbacks
- Darrell Funk (Colorado State)
  Offensive line
- Fesi Sitake (Southern Utah)
  Passing game coordintor/wide receivers
- Steve Clark (BYU)
  Tight ends
- Harvey Unga (BYU)
  Running backs
- Ilaisa Tuiaki (Southern Utah)
  Defensive coordinator, interior defensive line
- Jernaro Gilford (BYU)
  Cornerbacks
- Preston Hadley (BYU)
  Defensive ends/hybrids
- Kevin Clune (Cal State Fullerton)
  Linebackers
- Nu'u Tafisi (California)
  Director of strength and conditioning
- Justin McClure (Northern Colorado)
  Football strength and conditioning coach
- Kalani Simeona (BYU)
  Football strength and conditioning coach
- Jon Swift (BYU)
  Chief of staff
- Jack Damuni (BYU)
  Director of football relations
- Justin Anderson (BYU)
  Chief of staff
- Billy Nixon (BYU)
  Director of football operationst
- Brandon Bradley (BYU)
  Director of campus experience
- Mike Hall (BYU)
  Director of player development
- Josh Hewitt (BYU)
  Director of equipment operations for football
- Kurt Hunsaker (BYU-Idaho)
  Director of compliance
- Dan Wilcox(BYU)
  Director of football sports performance nutrition
- Tyson McDaniel (Arizona State)
  Offensive analyst
- Matt Mitchell (Wheaton)
  Offensive analyst
- Alfred Pupunu (Weber State)
  Offensive analyst
- Vince Feula (BYU)
  Defensive analyst
- Jan Jorgensen (BYU)
  Defensive analyst
- Randy Coy Jr. (Utah Valley)
  Defensive analyst
- Gavin Fowler (BYU)
  Defensive and special teams analyst
- Jordan Howard (UMKC)
  Offensive graduate assistant
- Spencer Patterson (Utah Tech)
  Offensive graduate assistant
- DJ Williams (Utah State)
  Defensive graduate assistant

Legend

- (C) Team captain
- (S) Suspended
- (I) Ineligible
- Injured
- Redshirt

Roster

=== Depth chart ===
Defense

FS
Talon Alfrey
Matt Criddle
Ethan Slade

WLB	MLB	SLB
Ben Bywater	Pepe Tanuvasa	Jackson Kaufusi
Morgan Pyper	Fisher Jackson	Bodie Schoonover
Micah Wilson	Logan Pili	Josh Wilson

SS
Micah Harper
Ammon Hannemann
George Udo

CB
Gabe Jeudy-Lally
D'Angelo Mandell
Jacob Boren

DE	DT	DT	DE
Tyler Batty	Caden Haws	Gabe Summers	Earl Tuioti-Mariner
Alden Tofa	Atunaisa Mahe	Lorenzo Fauatea	John Nelson
Aisea Moa	Hunter Greer	Bruce Mitchell	Blake Mangelson

CB
Kaleb Hayes
Jakob Robinson
Mory Bamba

Offense

X-Receiver
Keanu Hill
Braydon Cosper
Hobbs Nyborg

LT	LG	C	RG	RT
Blake Freeland	Clark Barrington	Connor Pay	Joe Tukuafu	Kingsley Suamataia
Sione Veikoso	Sam Dawe	Joe Tukuafu	Tyler Little	Lisala Tai
Talin Togiai	Donovan Hanna	Peter Falaniko	Trevin Ostler	Brayden Keim

TE
Isaac Rex
Ethan Erickson
Carter Wheat

Z-Receiver
Puka Nacua
Chase Roberts
Talmage Gunther

QB
Jaren Hall
Cade Fennigan
Sol-Jay Maiava-Peters

Key reserves
DL Alema Pilimai
DB Carter Krupp
DB Chika Ebunoha
DB Hayden Livingston
DL Logan Lutui
WR Tanner Wall
DB Korbyn Green
DL Joshua Singh

RB
Christopher Brooks
Hinckley Ropati
Miles Davis

FB
Masen Wake
Houston Heimuli
Mason Fakahua

Special teams
PK Jake Oldroyd
PK Justen Smith
P Ryan Rehkow
P Cash Peterman
KR Hobbs Nyborg
KR Talmage Gunther
PR Hobbs Nyborg
PR Talmage Gunther
LS Britton Hogan
LS Dalton Riggs
H Ryan Rehkow
H Talmage Gunther
