= Michael Thomas =

Michael or Mike Thomas may refer to:

== Entertainment ==
- Michael M. Thomas (1936–2021), American novelist of financial thrillers
- Michael Tilson Thomas (1944–2026), American conductor, composer and pianist
- Michael Thomas (actor) (1952–2019), British actor
- Mike Thomas (author) (born 1971), British novelist, Pocket Notebook
- Michael Thomas (born 1981), Welsh heavy metal drummer of Bullet for My Valentine
- Michael Thomas (Man Gone Down author), American author
- Michael Damian Thomas, American magazine editor and podcaster
- Michael J Thomas, American saxophonist, songwriter, and vocalist
- Michael Thomas, former guitarist with the metal band Tuff

== Sports ==
=== American football ===
- Michael Thomas (defensive back) (born 1989), American football defensive back
- Mike Thomas (running back) (1953–2019), American football running back
- Mike Thomas (wide receiver, born 1987), American football wide receiver
- Michael Thomas (wide receiver, born 1993), American football wide receiver
- Mike Thomas (wide receiver, born 1994), American football wide receiver

=== Association football/soccer ===
- Mickey Thomas (footballer) (born 1954), Welsh footballer, played for Manchester United and Chelsea
- Michael Thomas (footballer, born 1967), English footballer, played for Arsenal and Liverpool
- Michael Thomas (American soccer) (born 1988), American soccer player
- Michael Thomas (footballer, born 1992), English footballer

=== Other sports ===
- Mike Thomas (baseball) (born 1969), American baseball pitcher

== Other ==
- Michael David Thomas (born 1933), former attorney general of Hong Kong
- Michael E. Thomas (1937–2018), university administrator and professor of industrial engineering
- Mike Thomas (politician) (born 1944), Labour Party member of the UK Parliament who defected to the SDP
- Michael C. Thomas (1948–2019), American entomologist
- Michael Thomas (academic) (born 1969), English professor and author in digital education
- Mike Thomas (athletic director), American university administrator
- Mike Seager Thomas, British archaeologist
- Michael Albert Thomas, Indian-American physicist, academic, and clinical researcher
- Michael Thomas (1858–1929), British zoologist better known as Oldfield Thomas

== See also ==
- Mick Thomas (born 1960), Australian singer-songwriter
- Michel Thomas (1914–2005), language instructor
- Mickey Thomas (disambiguation)
