= Puka Nacua =

American football player (born 2001)

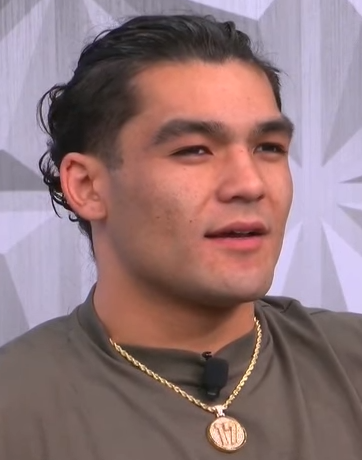
- Nacua in 2024

No. 12 – Los Angeles Rams
- Position: Wide receiver
- Roster status: Injured reserve

Personal information
- Born: May 29, 2001 (age 25); Las Vegas, Nevada, U.S.
- Listed height: 6 ft 2 in (1.88 m)
- Listed weight: 216 lb (98 kg)

Career information
- High school: Orem (Orem, Utah)
- College: Washington (2019–2020); BYU (2021–2022)
- NFL draft: 2023: 5th round, 177th overall pick

Career history
- Los Angeles Rams (2023–present)

Awards and highlights
- First-team All-Pro (2025); Second-team All-Pro (2023); 2× Pro Bowl (2023, 2025); NFL receptions leader (2025); PFWA All-Rookie Team (2023); NFL records: Receiving yards in a rookie season: 1,486; Receptions by a rookie in a game: 15; Most career receiving yards per game: 96.2 (Note: Minimum 200 career receptions.)

Career NFL statistics as of 2026
- Receptions: 383
- Receiving yards: 4,906
- Receiving touchdowns: 23
- Stats at Pro Football Reference

Makea "Puka" Nacua (/ˈpuːkə nəˈkuːə/; born May 29, 2001) is an American professional football wide receiver for the Los Angeles Rams of the National Football League (NFL). He played college football for the Washington Huskies and BYU Cougars and was selected by the Rams in the fifth round of the 2023 NFL draft. Nacua exceeded expectations in his first year, setting the NFL rookie record for receiving yards and receptions and earning Pro Bowl and second-team All-Pro honors. In 2025, he led the league in receptions and was named first-team All-Pro along with a second Pro Bowl nod following that season, and he is considered one of the top wide receivers in professional football.

== Early life ==
Nacua was born on May 29, 2001, in Las Vegas, Nevada. His mother is of Samoan and German descent, and his father was of Hawaiian and Portuguese descent. Nacua acquired the nickname "Puka", meaning fat and chubby in Samoan, due to his size as a baby. Nacua grew up in Provo, Utah, and attended Orem High School in Orem, Utah. He finished his high school career with 260 receptions for 5,226 yards and 58 touchdowns, all of which are Utah state records. Nacua was named the Polynesian High School Football Player of the Year in 2018.

== College career ==
=== University of Washington ===
Nacua began his college career at Washington. He played in the first eight games of his freshman season and caught seven passes for 168 yards and two touchdowns before suffering a broken foot. Nacua had nine receptions for 151 yards and one touchdown in three games during the team's COVID-19-shortened 2020 season. Following the end of the season, he entered the NCAA transfer portal.

=== Brigham Young University ===
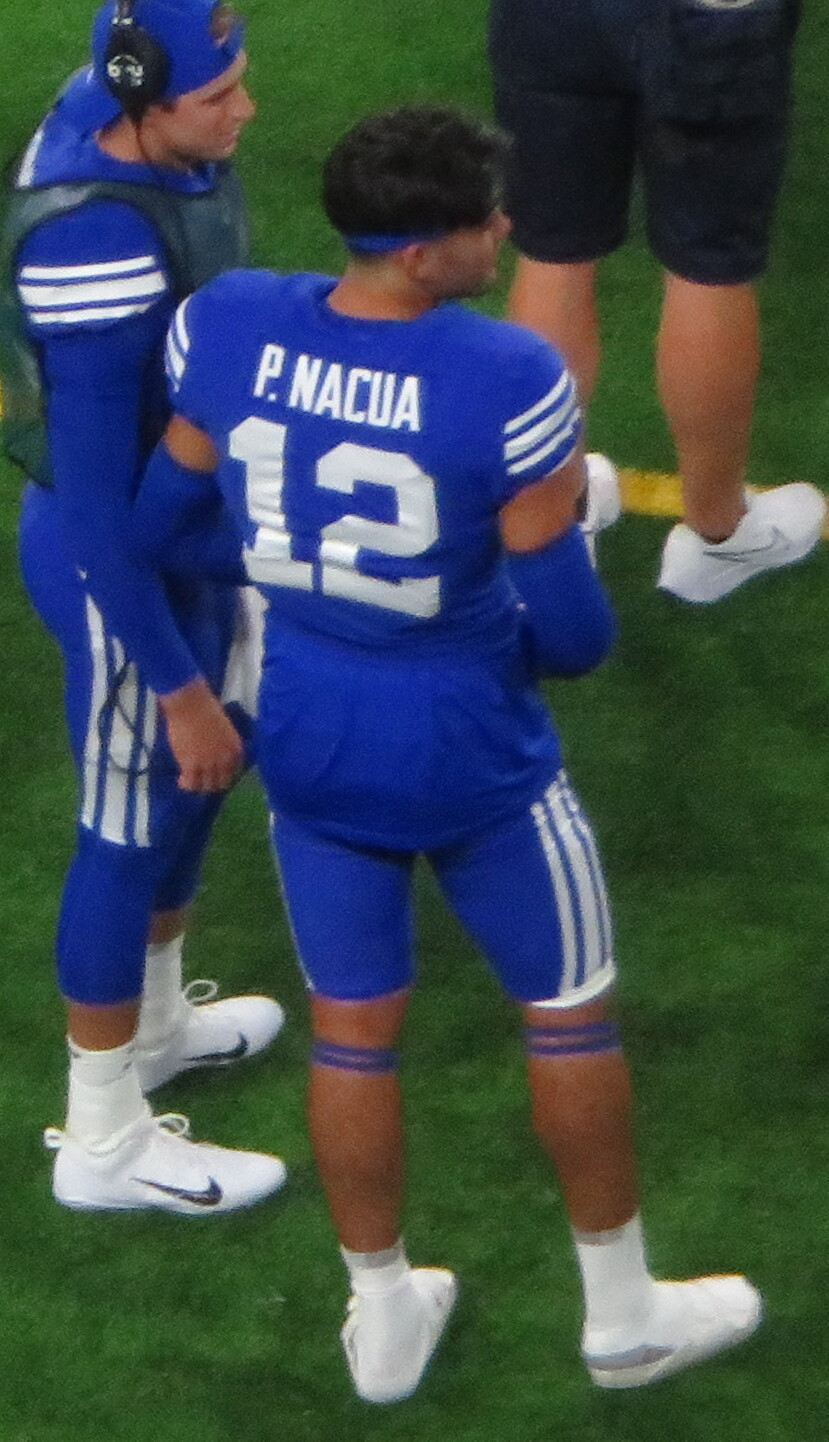
Nacua in 2021

Nacua transferred to BYU prior to the 2021 season. In his first season with the Cougars, he caught 43 passes for 805 yards and six touchdowns. He had four games going over the 100-yard mark in the 2021 season. In a 38–24 loss to Baylor played on October 16, 2021, Nacua had five receptions for a college career-best 168 yards with a touchdown. He also caught a pair of touchdowns in BYU's 34–17 win over Georgia Southern. On October 15, 2022, against Arkansas, he had eight receptions for 141 yards and a receiving touchdown to go with two rushing touchdowns. On November 5, in a victory over Boise State, he had 14 receptions (the most in any single game of his college career) for 157 yards and two touchdowns including the game-winning touchdown on fourth and goal to put BYU in front 31–28 with 32 seconds left.

Nacua finished the 2022 season with 48 receptions for 625 receiving yards and five receiving touchdowns. During his two seasons at BYU, Nacua totaled 91 receptions for 1,430 yards with 11 touchdowns and ran the ball 39 times for 357 yards (an average of 9.2 yards per rush) and scored five TDs on the ground.

== Professional career ==
=== Pre-draft ===
Pre-draft measurables
Height	Weight	Arm length	Hand span	Wingspan	40-yard dash	10-yard split	20-yard split	20-yard shuttle	Three-cone drill	Vertical jump	Broad jump	Bench press
6 ft 1 5/8 in (1.87 m)	201 lb (91 kg)	31 1/2 in (0.80 m)	9 1/2 in (0.24 m)	6 ft 2 7/8 in (1.90 m)	4.57 s	1.62 s	2.64 s	4.36 s	7.32 s	33.0 in (0.84 m)	10 ft 1 in (3.07 m)	15 reps
All values from NFL Combine/Pro Day

Nacua was selected by the Los Angeles Rams in the fifth round (177th overall) of the 2023 NFL draft. He was the 20th wide receiver picked. On June 20, 2023, Nacua signed a four-year rookie contract worth $4.08 million.

=== 2023 season ===
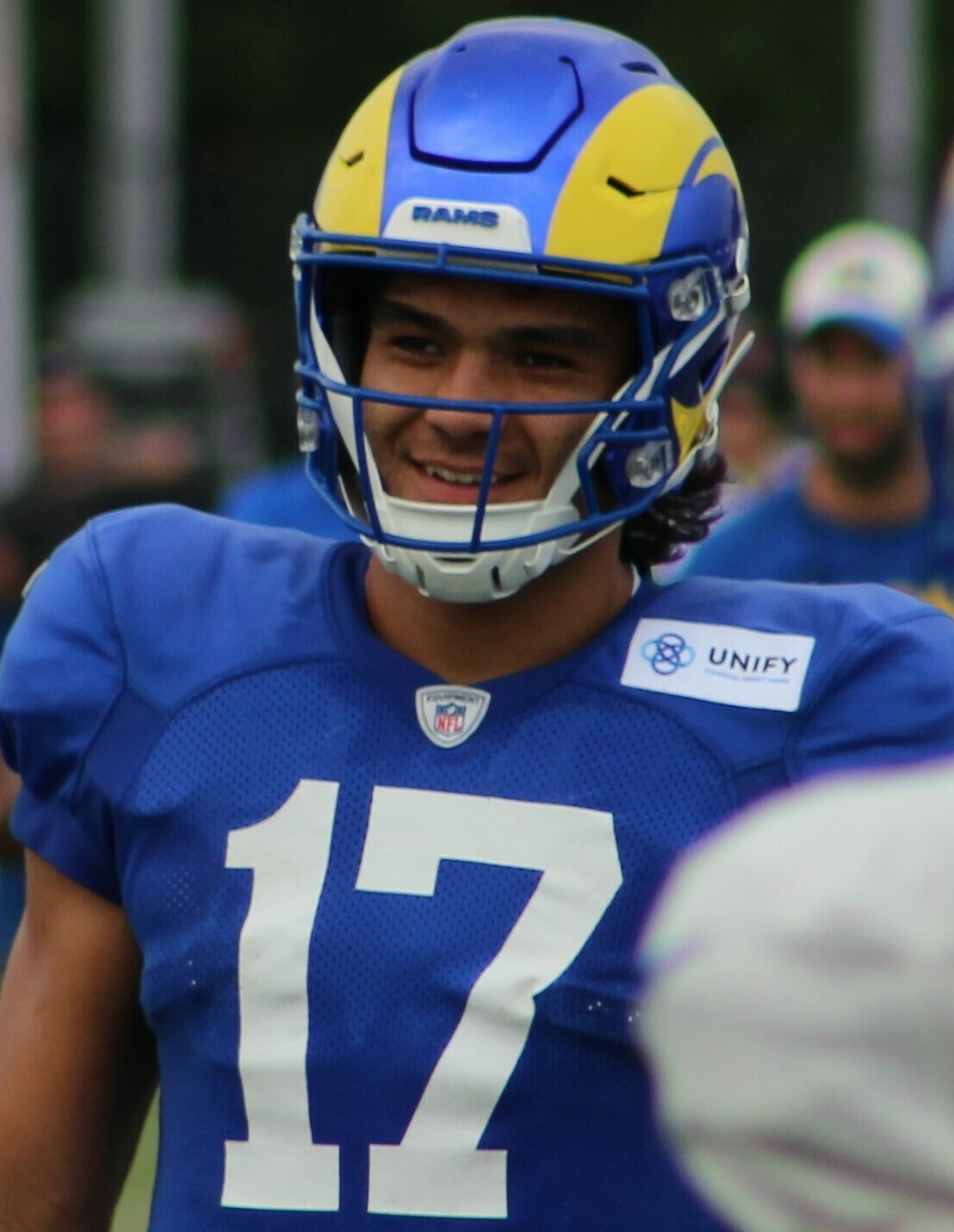
Nacua at training camp in 2023

In his first professional football game, Nacua caught three passes for 32 yards including an 11-yard touchdown reception in a 34–17 preseason loss to the Los Angeles Chargers. The performance elevated him to the starting lineup and he did not see further action during the preseason.

Nacua made his rookie debut for the Rams on September 10, 2023, against the rival Seattle Seahawks in Seattle. The Seahawks were heavy favorites because the Rams were coming off of an injury-riddled 2022 season and the team was without star receiver Cooper Kupp, who had been sidelined with a hamstring injury. Despite this, Nacua immediately became a formidable piece of the team's offense, recording 10 receptions for 119 yards as the Rams beat the Seahawks 30–13. Although he was first questionable with a rib injury, in his second game, Nacua broke the NFL single-game record for catches by a rookie as he caught 15 passes for 147 yards during a 30–23 loss to the San Francisco 49ers. The 25 receptions over his first two games was another rookie record, surpassing Earl Cooper's 43-year-old mark of 19, and Nacua also became the first player to record more than 10 catches and more than 100 yards in each of his first two NFL games. In the week 18 contest against the San Francisco 49ers January 7, 2024 Nacua achieved two NFL league records in this game, one being most receiving yards by a rookie and the other was most receptions in a single season by a rookie.

After catching five passes for 72 yards in Week 3 during a 19–16 loss to Cincinnati, Nacua had nine receptions for 163 yards, including his first NFL touchdown on a 22-yard reception in overtime to beat the Indianapolis Colts 29–23. During Week 7 against the Pittsburgh Steelers, Nacua finished with 154 receiving yards on eight receptions as the Rams lost 24–17. Against the Cleveland Browns in Week 13, Nacua surpassed 1,000 receiving yards on the year with a 70-yard touchdown reception as the Rams won 36–19. In Week 16 against the New Orleans Saints on Thursday Night Football, Nacua caught nine passes for 164 yards with a touchdown and ran twice for 16 yards and was named NFC Offensive Player of the Week. Against the New York Giants in Week 17, Nacua caught five passes for 118 yards, including a season-long 80-yard catch-and-run to set up a touchdown in the Rams' 26–25 victory.

Nacua finished his rookie year with 105 receptions for 1,486 yards, setting new NFL rookie single season records for total receptions (breaking the previous mark of 104 set by Jaylen Waddle in 2021) and total receiving yards (breaking the previous mark of 1,473 set by Bill Groman in 1960). He earned Pro Bowl honors and was named to the PFWA All-Rookie Team. In his first career playoff game, Nacua caught nine passes for 181 yards including a 50-yard touchdown in the narrow 24–23 road loss to the Detroit Lions during the NFC Wild Card Round. The yardage total set a new single-game record for receiving yards by a rookie in a playoff game, breaking the previous mark 160 set by Seattle's DK Metcalf in 2019. The record was then broken the following season by Los Angeles Chargers wide receiver Ladd McConkey. Nacua was ranked 33rd by his fellow players on the NFL Top 100 Players of 2024.

=== 2024 season ===
On August 4, 2024, Nacua suffered an injury during training, bursting the bursa sac in his right knee. Following the injury, Nacua was declared as week-to-week, and did not start practicing again until August 26. On September 4, he had completed a full practice and was cleared by the Rams for the season-opener game against the Detroit Lions. In the 26–20 overtime road loss to the Lions on September 8, Nacua caught four passes for 35 yards and ran the ball once for seven yards, but exited the game in the second quarter and did not return. The next day, Nacua was diagnosed with a posterior cruciate ligament (PCL) sprain and was placed on injured reserve. After missing five games, Nacua was activated off injured reserve on October 24 and played in the Rams' Week 8 matchup against the Minnesota Vikings, finishing with 106 receiving yards on seven receptions in a 30–20 victory. A week later, Nacua caught one pass for 11 yards (a career single-game low) at Seattle, but was ejected from the game in the second quarter for unsportsmanlike conduct after throwing a punch during a post-play altercation with Seahawks linebacker Tyrel Dodson. On December 8, Nacua put up 12 receptions for 162 receiving yards with one receiving touchdown, and five rushes for 16 yards and one rushing touchdown in a 44–42 win over the Buffalo Bills. He also became the first player in Rams franchise history to put up at least 150 receiving yards, a rushing touchdown, and a receiving touchdown in a game. Four days later in a Week 15 Thursday Night Football matchup against the San Francisco 49ers, Nacua caught seven passes for 97 yards in a touchdown-free, rain-filled 12–6 victory at Levi's Stadium. One of those catches – against 49ers cornerback Charvarius Ward early in the first quarter – was widely compared by fans to David Tyree's Helmet Catch against the New England Patriots in the final two minutes of Super Bowl XLII. Nacua also ran the ball two times for 11 yards. Against Arizona in a Week 17 clash at SoFi Stadium, Nacua had 10 receptions for 129 yards in the Rams' 13–9 win. Nacua was inactive for the Rams' regular season finale versus Seattle, ending his year just 10 yards short of a 1,000-yard season. In the NFC playoffs, Nacua caught five passes for 44 yards and one rush for seven yards in a 27–9 victory over the Minnesota Vikings in the wild card round, and then six receptions for 97 yards in a 28–22 loss to the Philadelphia Eagles in a divisional round game. He was ranked 41st by his fellow players on the NFL Top 100 Players of 2025.

=== 2025 season ===
On March 11, 2025, the Rams announced that Nacua would switch his jersey number from 17 to 12, his college number. Nacua had a prolific start to the season, catching 42 passes for 503 yards in the month of September, leading the league in both categories. In Week 4, Nacua caught 13 receptions for 170 yards in a 27–20 victory over the Indianapolis Colts, earning him NFC Offensive Player of the Week honors. Nacua suffered an ankle sprain in the Rams' Week 6 victory over the Baltimore Ravens and was held out of the following week's contest against the Jacksonville Jaguars in London. Returning to action in Week 9 following a bye, Nacua had seven receptions for 95 yards including a diving 39-yard touchdown in the Rams' 34–10 rout of the New Orleans Saints. The following week against San Francisco, he caught five passes for 64 yards and a score as the Rams defeated the 49ers 42–26. In the game, he became the fastest wide receiver in NFL history to reach 250 career receptions in his 36th game.

In Week 14, Nacua recorded seven catches for 167 yards and two touchdowns in a 45–17 win over the Arizona Cardinals and was named NFC Offensive Player of the Week for the second time in the season. In the Rams' 41–34 victory over the Detroit Lions in Week 15, Nacua caught nine receptions for a career-high 181 yards (coincidentally matching his 9-for-181 performance against Detroit in the 2023 NFC Wild Card Game). Against the Seattle Seahawks in Week 16, Nacua caught 12 receptions for a regular season career-high 225 yards (breaking his own personal best set the previous week) and two touchdowns in the Rams' 38–37 overtime loss. In the regular season's final two weeks, Nacua had five receptions for 47 yards and a touchdown in a 27–24 loss at Atlanta, and added 10 receptions for 76 yards and a touchdown (along with two rushes for 24 yards) in a 37–20 victory over Arizona.

For his career, Nacua established new single season highs for receptions (129, which led the NFL), yardage (1,715, second in the NFL behind Jaxon Smith-Njigba) and touchdowns (10), was voted a unanimous selection on the Associated Press All-Pro first team, as well as first team All-NFL and All-NFC by the Pro Football Writers Association. He earned Pro Bowl honors for the second time. In the NFL playoffs, Nacua had a new single-game postseason high of 10 receptions for 111 yards and a touchdown while also adding three rushes for 14 yards and another touchdown to help the Rams rally to defeat the Carolina Panthers 34–31 in an NFC Wild Card game. In the Divisional Round a week later against the Chicago Bears, Nacua had five catches for 56 yards and added a critical two-yard run on fourth down to give the Rams a first-and-goal at the Chicago 5, setting up a fourth-quarter touchdown in the Rams' 20–17 overtime victory. In a rematch with Seattle in the NFC Championship Game, Nacua had nine receptions for 165 yards and one rush for four yards in the Rams' 31–27 loss. He joined former teammate Cooper Kupp as the only wide receivers in NFL history to have over 2,000 receiving yards combined in the regular season and postseason of the same season. In the NFL Top 100 Players of 2026 list, Nacua was ranked seventh.

=== 2026 season ===
In the Rams' season-opening game in Melbourne, Australia, Nacua had five receptions for 74 yards in L.A.'s 27–7 loss to San Francisco. Reportedly dealing with a hip injury during the following week's practices (later revealed to be a pre-hernia), Nacua was declared inactive and did not play in either the Rams' 28–6 victory over the New York Giants or L.A.'s 30–26 loss at the Denver Broncos. Nacua returned to the starting lineup in Week 4 and recorded nine receptions for 125 yards, while also scoring on a 2-yard run in the Rams' 24–20 win over the Philadelphia Eagles. In Week 5 against the Buffalo Bills, Nacua set a new single-game career high for receptions with 17 catches for 138 yards and a touchdown in the Rams' 37–34 overtime loss. Returning to the city of his birth in Week 8, Nacua had eight receptions for 68 yards and a touchdown in the Rams' 35–21 victory over the Las Vegas Raiders. In Week 9 against the Washington Commanders, Nacua recorded 14 receptions (on 19 targets) for 150 receiving yards and the game-winning fourth-quarter touchdown, along with 20 rushing yards on two carries, in a 20–13 road victory. With his 14 catches, Nacua reached 70 receptions through his first seven appearances of the season, breaking Adam Thielen's NFL record of 67 set in 2018. The performance marked Nacua's ninth career game with at least 150 receiving yards—surpassing Pro Football Hall of Famers Jerry Rice and Randy Moss (eight) for the second-most by a player in his first four seasons since 1970, trailing only Justin Jefferson (11)—and his 21st career game with 100 or more receiving yards, passing A. J. Green (20) for the third-most in a player's first four seasons in NFL history, behind only Jefferson (29) and Moss (23). Additionally, it was Nacua's fourth career game with at least 10 receptions, 150 receiving yards, and a touchdown, tying Pro Football Hall of Famer Isaac Bruce, CeeDee Lamb, and Michael Thomas for the second-most by a player in his first four seasons, trailing only Ja'Marr Chase (five). However, Nacua suffered right knee ligament (MCL and PCL) sprains and turf toe on his final touch of the game. Though the team considered other options at first, Nacua was ultimately moved to the Rams' injured reserve list on November 12, 2026. On November 20, the NFL suspended Nacua for three games due to violating the league's personal conduct policy.

== Career statistics ==
Legend
	Led the league
**Bold**	Career high

=== NFL ===
==== Regular season ====
Year	Team	Games		Receiving								Rushing					Fumbles	
Year	Team	GP	GS	Tgt	Rec	Yds	Avg	Lng	Y/G	TD	FD	Att	Yds	Avg	Lng	TD	Fum	Lost
2023	LAR	17	17	160	105	1,486	**14.2**	**80**	87.4	6	68	**12**	89	7.4	31	0	**1**	0
2024	LAR	11	11	106	79	990	12.5	51	90.0	3	47	11	46	4.2	9	**1**	0	0
2025	LAR	16	15	**166**	**129**	**1,715**	13.3	58	**107.2**	**10**	**80**	10	**105**	**10.5**	**45**	**1**	**1**	**1**
2026	LAR	7	7	93	70	715	10.2	43	102.1	4	35	7	41	5.9	15	**1**	**1**	0
Career		51	50	525	383	4,906	12.8	80	96.2	23	242	40	281	7.0	45	3	3	1

==== Postseason ====
Year	Team	Games		Receiving							Rushing					Fumbles	
Year	Team	GP	GS	Tgt	Rec	Yds	Avg	Lng	Y/G	TD	Att	Yds	Avg	Lng	TD	Fum	Lost
2023	LAR	1	1	10	9	181	**20.1**	**50**	**181.0**	1	1	−2	−2.0	−2	0	**1**	0
2024	LAR	2	2	23	11	141	12.8	37	70.5	0	1	7	**7.0**	**7**	0	0	0
2025	LAR	3	3	**42**	**24**	**332**	13.8	44	110.7	**2**	**6**	**24**	4.0	5	**1**	0	0
Career		6	6	75	44	654	14.9	50	109.0	3	8	29	3.6	7	1	1	0

=== College ===
Season	Team	GP	Receiving			
Season	Team	GP	Rec	Yds	Avg	TD
2019	Washington	8	7	168	**24.0**	2
2020	Washington	3	9	151	16.8	1
2021	BYU	12	43	**805**	18.7	**6**
2022	BYU	9	**48**	625	13.0	5
Total		32	107	1,749	18.1	14

== Career highlights ==
=== Awards and honors ===
NFL

- Pro Football Focus Offensive Player of the Year (2025)
- First-Team All-Pro (2025)
- Second-team All-Pro (2023)
- 2× Pro Bowl (2023, 2025)
- Ranked No. 33 in the NFL Top 100 Players of 2024
- Ranked No. 41 in the NFL Top 100 Players of 2025
- Ranked No. 7 in the NFL Top 100 Players of 2026
- 3× NFC Offensive Player of the Week: Week 16 (2023), Week 4 (2025), Week 14 (2025)
- NFL Offensive Rookie of the Month: December/January (2023)
- Polynesian Professional Football Player of the Year (2025)

High school

- Polynesian High School Football Player of the Year (2018)

=== NFL records ===
- Most receiving yards in a single season by a rookie: 1,486 (2023)
- Most receptions in a game by a rookie: 15 (2023)
- Most receptions in a player’s first 40 regular season games: 277 (2025)
- Fastest to 4,000 career receiving yards (42 games, tied with Lance Alworth, Justin Jefferson, Odell Beckham Jr.) (2025)
- Fastest to 300 career receptions (43 games) (2025)
- Most receptions in a player’s first 50 regular season games: 369 (2026)
- Most receptions by a player in his first seven games of an NFL season: 70 (2026)

== Personal life ==
Nacua has one son, who was born in October 2025, with his college girlfriend, Hallie.

Nacua's older brother Samson plays wide receiver with the Michigan Panthers of the United Football League, and transferred from the University of Utah to BYU at the same time Puka transferred from Washington. Samson went undrafted and spent time with the Indianapolis Colts and the UFL's Pittsburgh Maulers. Another older brother, Kai Nacua, plays safety for the UFL's Michigan Panthers after playing in the NFL.

Nacua's father, Lionel, died from complications of diabetes when Nacua was 11. His older cousin, Marist Liufau, is a linebacker who plays for the Dallas Cowboys.

While growing up in Las Vegas, Nacua played Pop Warner football with Dana White III, son of UFC CEO and president Dana White.

=== Business interests ===
On April 25, 2024, Nacua signed a multi-year footwear and apparel deal with Jordan Brand.

On August 28, 2024, Nacua was announced as one of seven NFL players that Little Caesars would have individual partnerships with, that would include personal endorsements and other promotional appearances.

On September 4, 2024, Nacua signed an endorsement deal with Gatorade, along with Ravens quarterback Lamar Jackson, Vikings wide receiver Justin Jefferson, and flag football player Diana Flores.

In December 2025, Experian began airing a new national "Big Financial Friend" ad campaign that featured Nacua and 49ers linebacker Fred Warner, emphasizing their real-life friendship as well as being football rivals.

== Controversies ==
=== Locker room livestream ===
In 2025, following a week 14 win against the Arizona Cardinals, Nacua live-streamed inside the Rams' locker room, despite it being against team policy and numerous teammates telling him to stop. When confronted by a teammate, Nacua denied he was livestreaming. Nacua was then approached by two other unnamed teammates telling him to end the livestream, but he refused and moved to the other side of the locker room. The livestream ended shortly after.

=== Adin Ross livestreams ===
In December 2025, Nacua drew scrutiny after appearing on a livestream with internet personality Adin Ross before a game against the Seattle Seahawks. Ross convinced Nacua to perform an antisemitic gesture, described by Ross as "Jew Hands" away from Nacua, and asked him to use it as a touchdown celebration the next time he scored. Nacua later apologized for the act, saying he had no knowledge it was antisemitic in nature. Also during the livestream, Nacua criticized NFL game officials, and made more criticisms after the Week 16 game, prompting a $25,000 fine by the NFL. Prior to the livestream, Nacua had tried to bring Ross into the Rams practice facility but was denied by head coach Sean McVay.

=== Biting accusation ===
On March 25, 2026, a woman residing in the Los Angeles area filed a civil lawsuit against Nacua, stating Nacua made an unprovoked antisemitic statement before biting her on the shoulder later on. The woman, Madison Atiabi, who is Jewish, explained that on New Year's Eve, Nacua went on an antisemitic rant before later leaving bite marks on her shoulder. Nacua has denied all accusations, with his attorney saying, "[Nacua] denies these allegations in the strongest possible terms. We will be filing a defamation lawsuit and pursuing all available legal remedies in response to these false and damaging statements." However, on April 1, it was announced that Nacua checked himself into a rehabilitation center in Los Angeles. On November 19, 2026, the NFL suspended Nacua for three games and reportedly notified him that future violations of the conduct policy of the league could lead to harsher measures, including a permanent ban.
