= American Fork High School =

Location
- 510 N 600 E American Fork, Utah 84003; United States; 40°23′15″N 111°46′50″W

Information
- Type: Free public
- Motto: PROUD to be a CAVEMAN
- Established: 1902
- School district: Alpine School District
- Principal: Wade Lott
- Teaching staff: 92.44 (FTE)
- Grades: 10–12
- Enrollment: 2,316 (2024-2025)
- Student to teacher ratio: 25.05
- Campus type: Open
- Colors: Red and white with black as a fill color, not a standardized color
- Mascot: Caveman
- Website: afhs.alpineschools.org

American Fork High School is a public high school in American Fork, Utah, United States. Its mascot is the Caveman, chosen as a tribute to Timpanogos Cave. The school is best known for its award-winning cross country teams and excellent academics. The boys cross country team has consistently excelled in Utah and throughout the nation since their first state championship in 2009. American Fork High school is one of the oldest high schools in Utah.

== History ==
American Fork High School was established in 1902. The first classes were held in the back rooms of a downtown bank. The school was eventually moved to the Harrington School building, located where the American Fork Recreation Center and Pool Facilities now stand, until the current facility was constructed. Following construction, American Fork High School was moved again in 1959, to its current location on 600 East in American Fork, also known as Caveman Blvd. Since opening, several new additions and renovations have been built including the construction of a new wing of 27 new classrooms and complete administrative facilities. A new main gym area was completed in the summer of 2014 and houses new training, locker, and weight rooms, in addition to dance, cheer, drill, and wrestling facilities.

== Academics ==
American Fork High School was ranked in the top-scoring 25 high schools in Utah, based on students' scores in Utah's Criterion Referenced Tests (CRT). The percentage of students who met proficiency standards were as follows: Language Arts 92%, Mathematics 45.6%, and Science 74.9%, all above average for the state. In addition, in 2011, 33% of seniors took one or more Advanced Placement test, with a pass rate of 78%.

== Athletics ==
The Cavemen currently play in Class 6A and Region IV. The school's girls' basketball team won the 2008–2009 Utah 5A state championship against Riverton High School, winning 51–40. In 2017, they became one of the first schools to participate in the 6A division. In 2022, The school's boys' basketball team, ranked #10, beat Corner Canyon High School, ranked #4, to win the 6A Boys' Basketball Championship 43–39. In 2012 the baseball team won its first state championship in 27 years. In 2014, the football team made it to the state championship game for the first time since 1962, where they lost to Bingham High School. In 2018, the football team again played in the state championship game losing to Lone Peak High School. In 2019, the football played in the back to back state championship game losing to Corner Canyon High School.

=== Cross-Country ===
The Cavemen boys team won their first state championship in 2009. They went undefeated in Utah, and broke the state record by 90 seconds. They went on to win NXN-SW and placed 8th at Nike Cross Nationals in Portland, Oregon. In 2010, they again went undefeated in the state of Utah, breaking in breaking their own state record by more than 30 seconds. They were again ranked #1 nationally for a time by ESPN-RISE. In 2011 the Cavemen again went undefeated in the state of Utah. They then won a third consecutive NXN-SW crown and placed 6th at Nike Cross Nationals. In 2012 the Cavemen won their fourth straight State trophy. They then won NXN-SW. In 2022, the boys' team won the 6A State Championship on October 25. They were the subject of an article in the Provo Daily Herald. Coming in second was Lone Peak, while their girls' team came in second to Lone Peak. The Cavemen also had individual state champions in 2013, 2014, 2015, 2016, 2018, and 2022. The team time state record is held by the 2016 team in 76:31.9. As of 2021, they have placed second three times at Nike Cross Nationals, and they won the RunningLane XC National Championships in 2020 (Nike Cross Nationals was cancelled that year due to the COVID-19 pandemic) by setting a national record for fastest average 5K at 15:00.99. In 2023, American Fork won 6A state, with the top 3 runners being from American Fork. They also won NXR and placed 2nd at NXN.

The girls' cross-country team won state championships in 2009, 2014, 2015, 2016, 2018, and 2021. In 2014 and 2021 they also won Nike Cross Regionals.

=== Cheer ===
American Fork High's cheer squad took second place at the Cheerleading Nationals in Anaheim, California in 2008–09. In 2009–10 they took first place at four regional competitions, including taking first place in the state of Utah. That same year they took second place at Nationals. Currently, in the 2010–2011 season, the cheerleaders took first place at every regional competition, including taking first place in state. They competed at the United Spirit Association cheerleading nationals on March 26, 2011, and took second place. They placed first at the 2012 Championships.

== Marching band ==
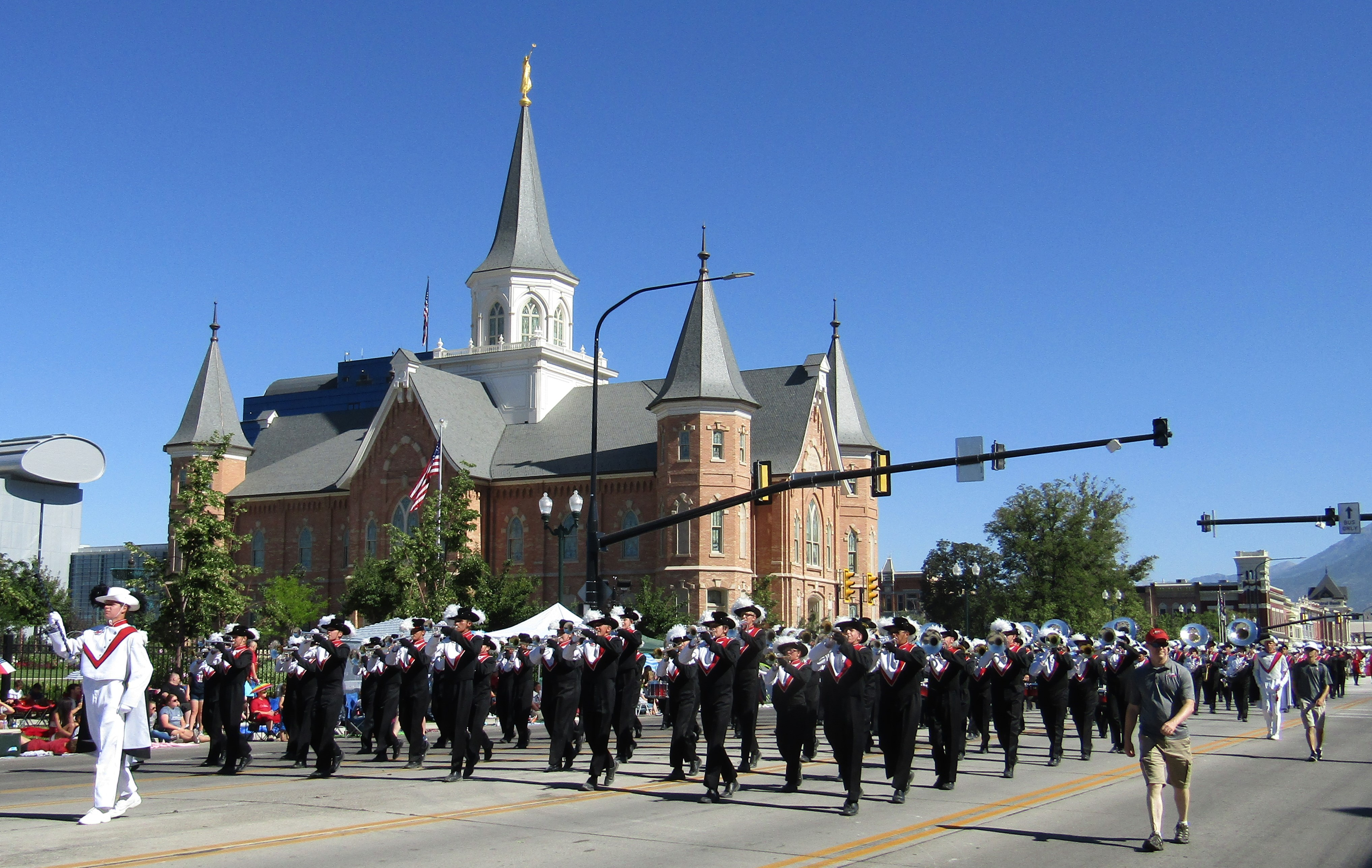
American Fork Marching Band in the 2018 Freedom Festival Parade in Provo, July 2018

The American Fork High School Marching Band has been invited to parades across the nation, and has performed at Bands of America (BOA) competitions on multiple occasions. They qualified in 1995 for Finals at the Bands of America Grand National Championships. They marched in the 1998 Rose Parade in Pasadena, California. In January 2005, they participated in President George W. Bush's second inauguration parade. In 2007 and 2014, they traveled to New York City as one of only 2 bands from Utah to ever participate in the Macy's Thanksgiving Day Parade. In 2008, the band placed first at the BOA Regional in Las Vegas, becoming the reigning Western Regional Champions, the only band from Utah ever to win the title. The band then won the Western Regional competition in 2009. In 2010 and 2011 the band placed second overall. The band were BOA Regional Champions again in 2012, 2013, 2014, 2015, 2016, 2017, 2019, 2021, 2022, and 2023.In the 2023 season, the band won the Arizona and St George Regionals, the band's first time winning two regionals in a year.

In 2008, the American Fork High School Marching Band traveled to Indianapolis, Indiana for the Bands of America Grand National Championships. They made it to the semifinals and placed 14th out of nearly 90 bands. At the 2009 Grand National Competition, the American Fork Marching Band was presented with the Esprit de Corps award. They also placed 15th in the nation when they competed in one of the most competitive years Grand Nationals has ever seen. In 2010, American Fork was one of the three recipients of the Sudler Shield. In 2013, the band took 17th place in the Bands of America Grand National Championships. The band went to grand nationals once again in 2018 after a 5-year break from the competition. They placed 16th and less than 1.05 points away from finals while competing in a very competitive semi-finals competition. In 2020, amidst the COVID-19 pandemic, the band participated in the V-USBands program, and won 1st place in Division 4 at the National Championships. The band traveled to Bands Of America's Grand Nationals again in 2022 and placed 13th overall, their highest placement ever, only 0.4 points away from finals. The band once again participated in the Bands of America Grand National Championships in Indianapolis, Indiana in November 2024, qualifying for finals for the first time since 1995, earning 8th place in the nation.

The band performed in the 2012 New Year's Day Rose Parade for the second time on January 2, 2012. The first performance was in 1972 under the direction of C. Russell Fadely. They are one of three bands in Utah's history to march in this parade.

The American Fork High School Marching Band also performed at the Grand Nationals in Indianapolis in 2022, with The Wonderful World of Warhol, where they took 13th place.

Recent performance titles include: 2024 – Spot On, 2023 – Visions of Red, 2022 – The Wonderful World of Warhol, 2021 – The Making of a Captain, 2020 – Starry, Starry Night, 2019 – The White Queen, 2018 – Another Viewpoint, 2017 – Dimensionality, 2016 – Beyond Limits, 2015 – Red Sky, 2014 – Bad Hair Day, 2013 – Fury, 2012 – Agency, 2011 – Shades of Conflict, 2010 – Pandemonium, 2009 – Greatest Generation, 2008 – The Island, 2007 – Pulse, 2006 – The Hyper Effect, and 2005 – Through The Eyes of a Child.

== Notable alumni ==
- Wayne C. Booth (1938), American literary critic
- Merrill J. Bateman (1954), emeritus general authority in the Church of Jesus Christ of Latter-day Saints; former president of Brigham Young University
- Julie B. Beck (1972), former Relief Society General President of the Church of Jesus Christ of Latter-day Saints
- Bronco Mendenhall (1984), football head coach for the Utah State Aggies
- Derek Smith (1993), NFL player
- Wayne Sermon (2002), lead guitarist of the rock band Imagine Dragons
- Jordan Devey (2006), NFL player, Super Bowl XLIX champion
- Witney Carson (2011), professional dancer on Dancing with the Stars
- Clayton Young (2012), professional long-distance runner and Olympian
- James Empey (2014), NFL player
- Rachel McCarthy (2019), professional soccer player
- Jamie Shepherd (2019), professional soccer player
- Bodie Schoonover (2020), defensive end for the BYU Cougars
- Garrison Grimes (2021), NFL long snapper for the New York Jets
- Maddux Madsen (2022), quarterback for the Boise State Broncos
- Carsen Ryan (2022), NFL tight end for the Cleveland Browns
