= Mickey Thomas =

Mickey Thomas may refer to:

- Mickey Thomas (footballer) (born 1954), Welsh football player
- Mickey Thomas (singer) (born 1949), American singer

== See also ==
- Michael Thomas (disambiguation)
- Mick Thomas (born 1960), singer-songwriter
