= Kai Nacua =

American football player (born 1995)

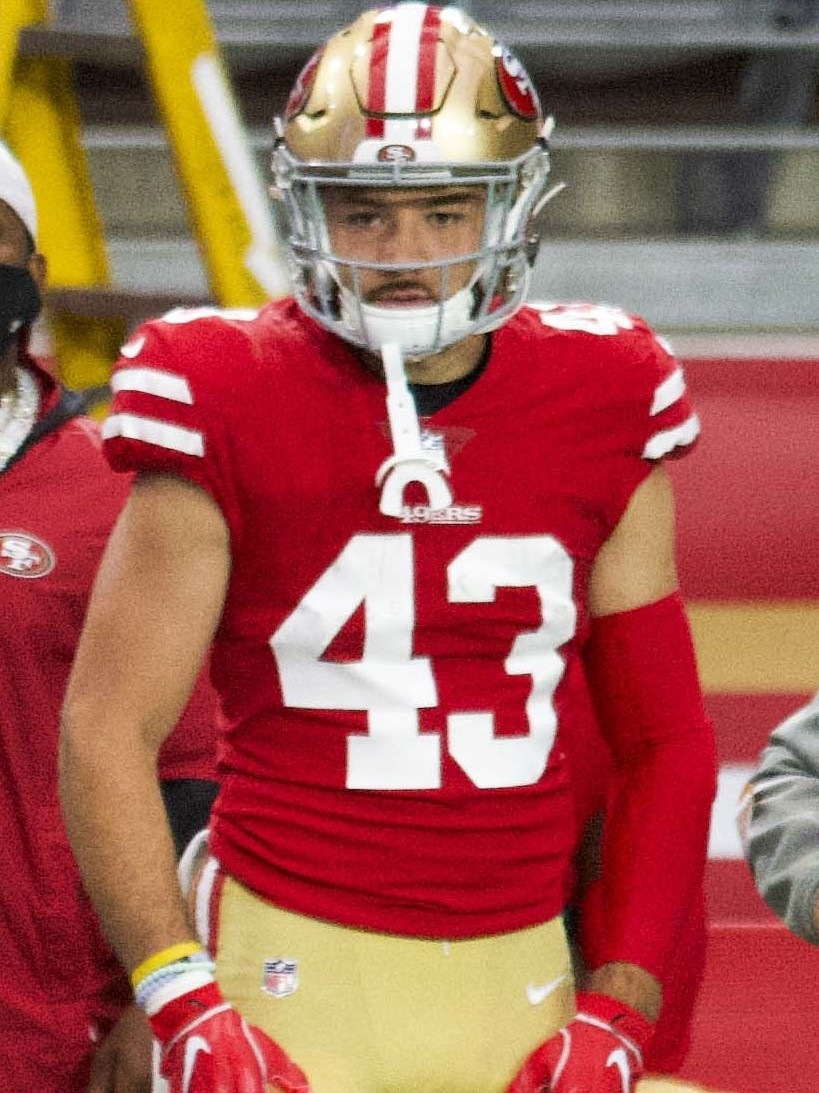
- Nacua with the San Francisco 49ers in 2020

No. 43, 1
- Position: Safety

Personal information
- Born: March 3, 1995 (age 31); Las Vegas, Nevada, U.S.
- Listed height: 6 ft 1 in (1.85 m)
- Listed weight: 205 lb (93 kg)

Career information
- High school: Liberty (Henderson, Nevada)
- College: BYU (2013–2016)
- NFL draft: 2017: undrafted

Career history
- Cleveland Browns (2017); Baltimore Ravens (2018)*; Carolina Panthers (2018–2019)*; Indianapolis Colts (2019); San Francisco 49ers (2020–2021); New York Jets (2021–2022); Michigan Panthers (2023–2025)
- * Offseason or practice squad member only

Awards and highlights
- All-UFL Team (2024); UFL interception leader (2024)

Career NFL statistics
- Total tackles: 19
- Stats at Pro Football Reference

Kaimana Kenneth Nacua Sr. (born March 3, 1995) is an American former professional football player who was a safety in the National Football League (NFL). He played college football for the BYU Cougars.

== Early life ==
Nacua enjoyed success as a quarterback for the Liberty Patriots. In his senior season in 2012, Nacua's athletic prowess led his team to an 11–2 record. Nacua also lettered in basketball and volleyball. Prior to graduation, Nacua received offers from San Diego State University (SDSU), the University of Nevada, Reno (UNR), and the University of Nevada, Las Vegas (UNLV).

== College career ==
Nacua committed to Brigham Young University (BYU) where he began his freshman season in 2013 as a defensive back with the BYU Cougars. After the 2014 Miami Beach Bowl loss to the Memphis Tigers, Nacua was seen throwing punches at both Memphis coaches and players. He started 24 of the 46 total games he played while in college. He made the 2015 Phil Steele's Postseason All-Independent First Team and was later named the 2016 College Sports Madness Preseason Defensive Player of the Year. Nacua also made the 2016-2017 Reese's Senior Bowl Watch List. During the 2016 season, Nacua made 14 career interceptions, breaking a record set by Derwin Gray. While at BYU, Nacua majored in exercise and wellness.

== Professional career ==
Pre-draft measurables
Height	Weight	Arm length	Hand span	40-yard dash	10-yard split	20-yard split	20-yard shuttle	Three-cone drill	Vertical jump	Broad jump	Bench press
6 ft 0 3/4 in (1.85 m)	205 lb (93 kg)	31 3/4 in (0.81 m)	9 5/8 in (0.24 m)	4.49 s	1.54 s	2.57 s	4.14 s	6.87 s	39 in (0.99 m)	10 ft 7 in (3.23 m)	15 reps
All values from BYU's Pro Day

=== Cleveland Browns ===
Nacua was signed by the Cleveland Browns as an undrafted free agent on May 4, 2017.

Throughout training camp, he competed for a roster spot against Justin Currie and Trey Caldwell. On September 3, 2017, the Browns waived Nacua and signed him to their practice squad the next day. On September 8, 2017, Nacua was promoted to the active roster. Head coach Hue Jackson named Nacua the backup strong safety behind Derrick Kindred to start the regular season.

He made his professional regular season debut in the Browns' season-opening 21–18 loss to the Pittsburgh Steelers. On December 3, 2017, Nacua made his first career tackle during a 19–10 loss at the Los Angeles Chargers. In Week 14, Nacua earned his first career start after Derrick Kindred suffered a wrist injury the week prior. Nacua recorded a season-high five solo tackles during the Browns' 27–21 loss to the Green Bay Packers. He finished the season with 14 combined tackles (12 solo) in 16 games and three starts.

Nacua was waived by the Browns on April 30, 2018.

=== Baltimore Ravens ===
On May 1, 2018, Nacua was claimed off waivers by the Baltimore Ravens. He was waived on August 31, 2018. He was re-signed to the practice squad on September 15, 2018. He was released on October 15, 2018.

=== Carolina Panthers ===
On December 5, 2018, Nacua was signed to the Carolina Panthers practice squad. He signed a reserve/future contract with the Panthers on December 31, 2018. He was waived on August 4, 2019.

=== Indianapolis Colts ===
On August 19, 2019, Nacua signed with the Indianapolis Colts. He was waived/injured on August 31, 2019, and was placed on injured reserve.

=== San Francisco 49ers ===
On November 24, 2020, Nacua was signed to the San Francisco 49ers practice squad. He was promoted to the active roster on December 2, 2020. On February 11, 2021, Nacua signed a one-year contract extension with the 49ers. He was released on August 27, 2021. He re-signed to the practice squad on September 10, 2021.

=== New York Jets ===
On December 23, 2021, Nacua was signed by the New York Jets off the 49ers practice squad. He was promoted to the active roster on December 25, 2021.

On August 23, 2022, Nacua was released. On November 29, 2022, he was re-signed to the Jets practice squad. He was released on December 29.

=== Michigan Panthers ===
Nacua signed with the Michigan Panthers of the United States Football League on May 9, 2023. He was named to the 2024 All-UFL team on June 5, 2024. In September 2024, the Panthers signed Nacua's younger brother, Samson Nacua.

On January 13, 2026, Nacua was selected by the DC Defenders in the 2026 UFL Draft. Nacua rejected the contract and announced his retirement.

== Career statistics ==
=== NFL ===
Year	Team	Games		Tackles				Interceptions					Fumbles	
Year	Team	GP	GS	Cmb	Solo	Ast	Sck	Int	Yds	Avg	TD	PD	FF	FR
2017	CLE	16	3	14	12	2	0.0	0	0	0	0	0	0	0
2020	SF	5	0	1	1	0	0.0	0	0	0	0	0	0	0
2021	SF	1	0	0	0	0	0.0	0	0	0	0	0	0	0
2021	NYJ	3	0	4	3	1	0.0	0	0	0	0	0	0	0
Career		25	3	19	16	3	0.0	0	0	0	0	0	0	0

=== UFL ===
Year	Team	Games	Tackles				Interceptions				Misc		
Year	Team	GP	Cmb	Solo	Ast	Sck	Int	Yds	Avg	TD	PD	FF	FR
2024	MICH	9	43	34	9	1.0	3	6	2.0	0	8	0	0
2025	MICH	10	44	26	18	0.0	1	80	80.0	1	4	0	0
Career		19	87	60	27	1.0	4	86	21.5	1	12	0	0

== Personal life ==
Nacua has three younger brothers who also play football, all of whom are wide receivers. Samson Nacua, who also played for the UFL's Panthers and most recently played in the NFL for the New Orleans Saints, Puka Nacua plays for the Los Angeles Rams, and Tei Nacua is a freshman WR for BYU. Samson also played at BYU after transferring from Utah, and Puka transferred to BYU from Washington. He is of Samoan and Hawaiian descent. He married Alexa Revelles on April 6, 2018. They have two sons, Kaimana Nacua Jr. (born April 10, 2020), and Mateo Rodolfo Nacua (born December 7, 2023), and a daughter, Gianna Nacua (born September 16, 2025).
