= Gabe Jeudy-Lally =

American football player (born 2001)

Profile
- Position: Cornerback

Personal information
- Born: February 16, 2001 (age 25); New York City, New York, U.S.
- Listed height: 6 ft 1 in (1.85 m)
- Listed weight: 189 lb (86 kg)

Career information
- High school: Ardrey Kell (Charlotte, North Carolina)
- College: Vanderbilt (2019–2021); BYU (2022); Tennessee (2023)
- NFL draft: 2024: undrafted

Career history
- Tennessee Titans (2024-2025)
- Stats at Pro Football Reference

Gabriel Valentin Jeudy-Lally (born February 16, 2001) is an American professional football cornerback. He played college football for the BYU Cougars, the Tennessee Volunteers and for the Vanderbilt Commodores.

== Early life ==
Jeudy-Lally was born in New York City, New York and grew up in Austin, Texas and attended Ardrey Kell High School in Charlotte, North Carolina. In his high school career, Jeudy-Lally would complete 103 solo tackles, three interceptions, six fumble recoveries am 23.7 yards/kick return. Jeudy-Lally would also complete 59 tackles, two interceptions and two fumble recoveries during his senior season. Jeudy-Lally announced that he would commit to play college football at Vanderbilt University.

== College career ==
=== Vanderbilt ===
During Jeudy-Lally's true freshman season in 2019, he played in four games. During the 2020 season, he played in seven games and started three of them, finishing the season with 13 total tackles (10 solo and three assisted), one tackle for loss, two pass breakups and an interception. During the 2021 season, he played in all 12 games and started 10 of them, finishing the season with 50 total tackles (35 solo and 15 assisted), one tackle for loss, two pass breakups and an interception.

On November 29, 2021, Jeudy-Lally announced that he would enter the transfer portal.

=== BYU ===
On December 12, 2021, Jeudy-Lally originally announced that he would transfer to Purdue, but would later decommit.

On March 21, 2022, Jeudy-Lally announced that he would transfer to BYU.

During the 2022 season, he played in all 13 games and started 10 of them, finishing the season with 47 total tackles (31 solo and 16 assisted), 0.5 tackles for loss, 0.5 sacks and seven pass breakups.

On December 28, 2022, Jeudy-Lally announced that he would enter the transfer portal for the second time.

=== Tennessee ===
On January 19, 2023, Jeudy-Lally announced that he would transfer to Tennessee.

During the 2023 season, he played in all 13 games and started 11 of them, finishing the season with 41 total tackles (29 solo and 12 assisted), four tackles for loss, a sack, a forced fumble, six pass breakups and an interception.

On January 2, 2024, Jeudy-Lally announced that he would declare for the 2024 NFL draft.

== Professional career ==
Pre-draft measurables
Height	Weight	Arm length	Hand span	40-yard dash	10-yard split	20-yard split	20-yard shuttle	Three-cone drill	Vertical jump	Broad jump
6 ft 1 in (1.85 m)	189 lb (86 kg)	31 7/8 in (0.81 m)	9 3/8 in (0.24 m)	4.60 s	1.58 s	2.63 s	4.35 s	7.15 s	36 in (0.91 m)	10 ft 2 in (3.10 m)
All values from Pro Day

Jeudy-Lally signed with the Tennessee Titans as an undrafted free agent on May 10, 2024. He was waived on August 27, and re-signed to the practice squad. Jeudy-Lally was elevated on October 20 to make his NFL debut in the team's Week 7 game against the Buffalo Bills as a contributor to special teams. He was promoted to the active roster the following week on October 26. Jeudy-Lally was waived on December 28. On December 31, the Titans re-signed Jeudy-Lally to their practice squad. He finished his rookie season with appearances in four games on special teams. He signed a reserve/future contract on January 6, 2025.

On August 26, 2025, Jeudy-Lally made the Initial 53-Man Roster. On August 27, 2025, Jeudy-Lally was waived by the Titans.
