= Mike Thomas (author) =

British author and police officer

Mike Thomas is a British writer and former South Wales police officer. He is known for his 2010 book Pocket Notebook, which was longlisted for the Wales Book of the Year.

== Bibliography ==
- Pocket Notebook (2010)
- Ugly Bus (2014)
