= Michael Albert Thomas =

Indian-American physicist and clinical researcher

- Occupations: Physicist, academic, and clinical researcher

Academic background
- Education: Ph.D., Nuclear Magnetic Resonance Spectroscopy
- Alma mater: Indian Institute of Science

Academic work
- Institutions: University of California, Los Angeles

Michael Albert Thomas (M. Albert Thomas) is an Indian-American physicist, academic, and clinical researcher. He is a Professor-in-Residence of Radiological Sciences, and Psychiatry at the Geffen School of Medicine, University of California, Los Angeles (UCLA). He is most known for developing novel single voxel based 2D NMR techniques (L-COSY and JPRESS), multi-voxel 2D MRS techniques (4D/5D echo-planar correlated and J-resolved spectroscopic Imaging, EP-COSI/EP-JRESI) using hybrid Cartesian as well as non-Cartesian spatio-temporal encoding such as concentric ring, radial and rosette trajectories.

Thomas has authored over 150 peer-reviewed publications and 12 book chapters. His research is focused on the physics of Magnetic resonance imaging and spectroscopy, with particular emphasis on the development and evaluation of Magnetic resonance spectroscopic imaging (MRSI) techniques in the context of healthy tissues and different pathologies.

Thomas is a life member of National Magnetic Resonance Society of India (NMRS). He was elected to the Experimental NMR Conference (ENC) executive committee in 2014, and was appointed the chair of the 61st ENC in 2020. He became a fellow of the American Institute for Medical and Biological Engineering (AIMBE) in 2018. He also served as an associate editor of Magnetic Resonance Insights, and is currently an associate editorial member of Medicine and Frontiers Oncology.

== Education ==
Thomas received his master's degree in physics from American College, Madurai, in 1978. He then enrolled at Indian Institute of Science, and earned a doctoral degree in nuclear magnetic resonance spectroscopy in 1984. Following his physics doctoral degree, Thomas served a postdoctoral fellow at Purdue University, and Swiss Federal Institute of Technology ETH Zurich until 1987. Later on, in 1987-1990, he completed his postdoctoral fellowship in radiology and MR spectroscopic imaging physics at the University of California, San Francisco.

== Career ==
Thomas began his career as a visiting scientist of physics at Indian Institute of Science in 1985. He held his next appointment as a visiting assistant research spectroscopist in the Department of Medicine at the University of California, San Francisco (UCSF) in 1987. From 1990 till 1993, he was appointed by the University of Wisconsin-Madison as assistant scientist of radiology and medical physics. He then joined David Geffen School of Medicine at UCLA in 1993, as an assistant professor of radiology and psychiatry. He became an associate professor in 2000 and a professor in 2006.

Thomas was appointed as director of clinical MR spectroscopy research at the University of Wisconsin-Madison till 1993, and as MR consultant for BF Research Institute GE 3T MRI Facility in early 2000s. He was an MR physicist consultant at Harbor-UCLA Radiology Imaging Center (2000-2014). Since 1993, he is the director of MR spectroscopy at UCLA Radiological Sciences. He was an integration panel member of the prostate cancer research program (PCRP) Congressionally Directed Medical Research Program (CDMRP).

== Research ==
Thomas has worked to develop novel single voxel based 2D NMR techniques (L-COSY and JPRESS), multi-voxel 2D MRS techniques (4D/5D echo-planar correlated and J-resolved spectroscopic Imaging, EP-COSI/EP-JRESI). His recent work has focused on non-Cartesian spatio-temporal encoding such as concentric ring, radial and rosette trajectories. Using accelerated acquisition and non-linear reconstruction (compressed sensing), MRSI data have been acquired within 20 minutes or so in contrast to a couple of hours of acquisition using the fully encoded multi-dimensional MRSI sequences. In 2007, he was awarded a US patent on a novel 2D localized correlated spectroscopy (L-COSY).

Thomas has successfully used his multi-dimensional 4D/5D EP-COSI and EP-JRESI techniques investigating breast and prostate cancer, neurochemistry of HIV and obstructive sleep apnea (OSA) patients, metabolites and lipids in calf muscle of patients with type 2 diabetes and in patients with major and late life depression.

In early 1990s, using a biomedical investigator grant awarded by the Whitaker Foundation, Thomas developed brain phantom with an intention to mimic the gray matter of human brain with the metabolites at physiological concentrations. He recorded spectra with phantoms containing common cerebral metabolites-alanine, N-acetyl aspartate, glutamine, glutamate (neurotransmitter), taurine, myo-inositol, glucose, aspartate, GABA, and choline at physiological and slightly higher concentrations. While demonstrating the strong coupling impacts in vitro and in vivo, he found out that in vivo 2D J-PRESS spectra of healthy human brain and patients with brain tumor are in conformity with those recorded from the brain phantom. Later on, he presented a theoretical calculation of the volume localization as well as the coherence transfer efficiencies in 2D MRS, while using the product operator formalism. He worked in a project focused on comparing differences in brain proton spectra between children and adolescents with bipolar disorder (BPD) and gender and age-matched normal controls. While utilizing in vivo proton magnetic resonance spectroscopy (1H MRS), he further measured changes in myo-inositol associated with acute lithium therapy persist in long-term clinical response of patients with and without lithium compliance.

Thomas also evaluated the biochemical basis of depression in patients with type 2 diabetes, while using proton (1H) Magnetic Resonance Spectroscopy (MRS). Results of his study suggested that alterations in terms of glutamate and glutamine levels in subcortical regions along with white matter changes in myo-inositol play a significant role in providing important neurobiological substrates of mood disorders. His 2007 study examined baseline 1HMRS spectra of bipolar depressed patients, with particular emphasis onto highlighting whether the level of cerebral metabolites changes after an open trial of lamotrigine, an anti-glutamatergic mood stabilizer. Later on, it was indicated that hippocampal changes serve to mediate the relationship between early-life adversity and depressive illness in a subset of patients. He also investigated the ability of magnetic resonance spectroscopy (MRS) to detect 2-HG production in order to non-invasively identify patients with IDH1 mutant brain tumors.

== Bibliography ==
- Thomas, M.A., Ramanathan, K.V. and Kumar, A. (1983). Application of 2‑dimensional correlation spectroscopy to oriented AA'BB' spin system. Journal of Magnetic Resonance, 55:386‑396.
- Kreis, R., Thomas, A., Studer, W., & Ernst, R. R. (1988). Low frequency pulse excitation in zero field magnetic resonance. The Journal of chemical physics, 89(11), 6623-6635.
- Thomas, M. A., Narayan, P., Kurhanewicz, J., Jajodia, P., & Weiner, M. W. (1990). 1H MR spectroscopy of normal and malignant human prostates in vivo. Journal of Magnetic Resonance (1969), 87(3), 610-619.
- Ryner, L. N., Sorenson, J. A., & Thomas, M. A. (1995). 3D localized 2D NMR spectroscopy on an MRI scanner. Journal of Magnetic Resonance, Series B, 107(2), 126-137.
- Thomas, M. A., Yue, K., Binesh, N., Davanzo, P., Kumar, A., Siegel, B., ... & Guze, B. (2001). Localized two‐dimensional shift correlated MR spectroscopy of human brain. Magnetic Resonance in Medicine: An Official Journal of the International Society for Magnetic Resonance in Medicine, 46(1), 58-67.
- Davanzo, P., Thomas, M. A., Yue, K., Oshiro, T., Belin, T., Strober, M., & McCracken, J. (2001). Decreased anterior cingulate myo-inositol/creatine spectroscopy resonance with lithium treatment in children with bipolar disorder. Neuropsychopharmacology, 24(4), 359-369.
- Thomas, M. A., Hattori, N., Umeda, M., Sawada, T., & Naruse, S. (2003). Adding a new spectral dimension to localized 3T 1H MR Spectroscopy-From Phantoms to Human Brain in vivo. NMR Biomed, 16, 245-251.
- Thomas, M. A., Chung, H. K., & Middlekauff, H. (2005). Localized two‐dimensional 1H magnetic resonance exchange spectroscopy: A preliminary evaluation in human muscle. Magnetic Resonance in Medicine: An Official Journal of the International Society for Magnetic Resonance in Medicine, 53(3), 495-502.
