= Bodie Schoonover =

American football player

No. 48 – BYU Cougars
- Position: Defensive lineman
- Class: Redshirt Senior

Personal information
- Listed height: 6 ft 3 in (1.91 m)
- Listed weight: 275 lb (125 kg)

Career information
- High school: American Fork (American Fork, Utah)
- College: BYU (2022–present)
- Stats at ESPN

Bodie Schoonover is an American football defensive end for the BYU Cougars.

== Early life ==
Schoonover attended American Fork High School in American Fork, Utah. He committed to play for the BYU Cougars over UCLA.

== College career ==
During his first three seasons from 2022 to 2024, Schoonover totaled six tackles with half a tackle for a loss in 22 games played. In week 9 of the 2025 season, he recorded two sacks in a win over Iowa State. Schoonover finished the 2025 season with 38 tackles with six and a half for a loss, and three sacks in ten starts, after which he announced that he would return to BYU for his senior season in 2026.
