= Mike Seager Thomas =

British archaeologist and author

Mike Seager Thomas is a British archaeologist specialising in the study of stone in prehistoric archaeology, Rapa Nui, conflict heritage and landscape archaeology. Till 2025 he was an honorary Research Fellow of the UCL Institute of Archaeology.

== Career ==
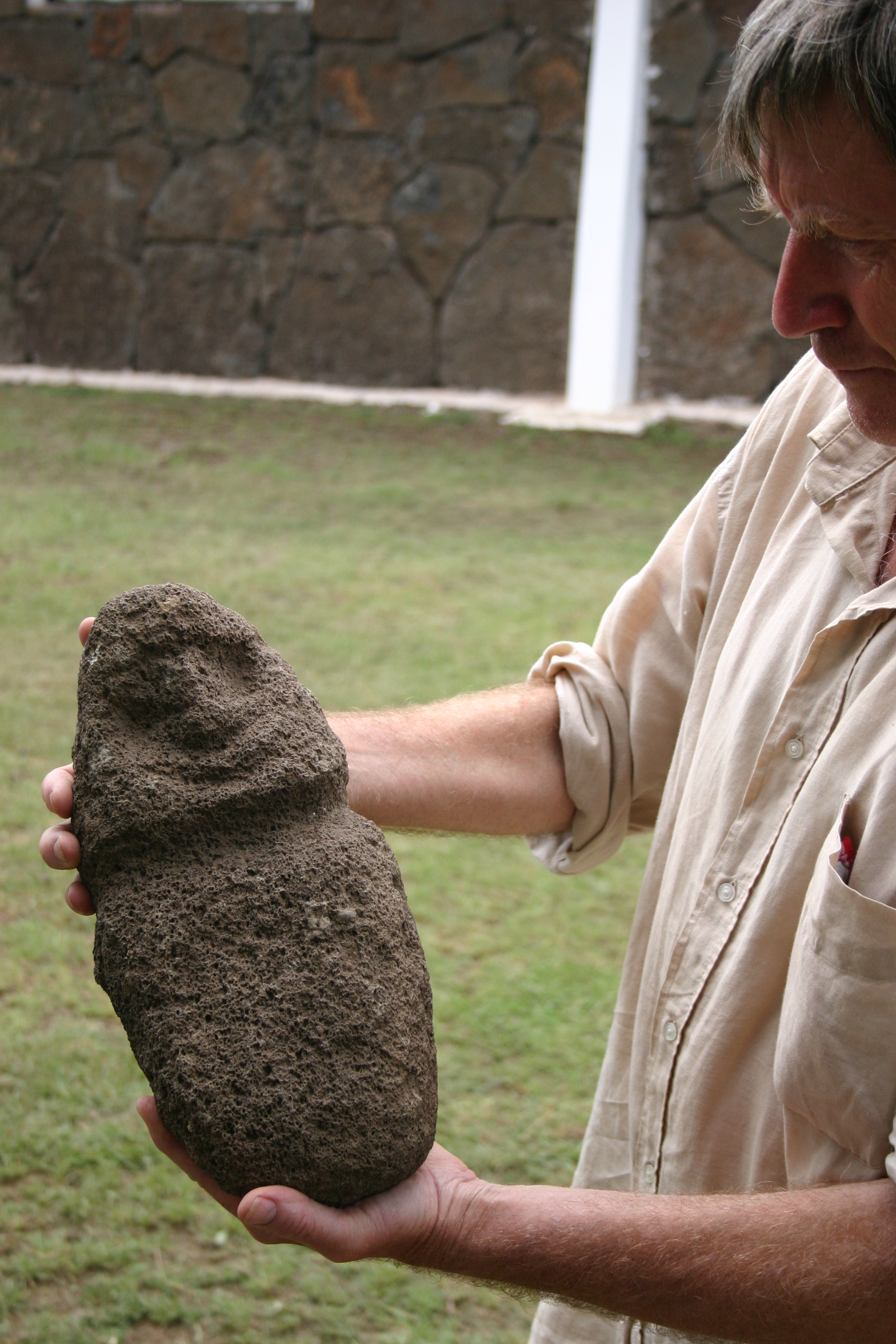
Mike Seager Thomas studying a Rapa Nui "house god" outside the Museo Antropológico P. Sebastián Englert in Hanga Roa, Rapa Nui

Mike Seager Thomas studied archaeology at the UCL Institute of Archaeology. He has been a full time professional archaeologist since 1996, working in the commercial sector as an excavator/excavation supervisor and as a freelance prehistoric pottery and stone specialist. Mike Seager Thomas is also a long-term participant in UCL Institute of Archaeology research projects, including the well-known Leskernick Project, the Tavoliere-Gargano Prehistory Project, and—most recently—the Rapa Nui (Easter Island) Landscapes of Construction Project, and he has reported on prehistoric pottery from several IoA Institute of Archaeology training excavations. Out of his involvement in the Leskernick Project, he became the principal subject of project sociologist Mike Willmore's very funny "The Book and the Trowel," published in the Leskernick project book Stone Worlds, and the perceived victim of a "top-down interpersonal project hierarchy," which challenged the egalitarian pretensions of what is otherwise considered a theoretically seminal archaeological project. He has ongoing academic interests in stone in prehistoric archaeology, conflict heritage and landscape archaeology, Rapa Nui, and the use of period photographs in archaeological and historical research. Books by Mike Seager Thomas include Excavating Stone Worlds (2007), co-written with Sue Hamilton and Phillip Thomas, the Afrikamütze Database, Volumes 1–3 (2019), Neolithic Spaces, Volume 2: The Bradford Archive and The WW2 Foggia Airfield Complex in the Bradford Archive of Aerial Photographs (both 2020), and Wally's War: The WW2 North African Campaign Diaries of Walter von Schramm of the NZ Graves Registration & Enquiries Unit (2024).
