= Samson Nacua =

American football player (born 1998)

Profile
- Position: Wide receiver

Personal information
- Born: January 20, 1998 (age 28); Las Vegas, Nevada, U.S.
- Listed height: 6 ft 3 in (1.91 m)
- Listed weight: 206 lb (93 kg)

Career information
- High school: Timpview (Provo, Utah)
- College: Utah (2016–2020); BYU (2021)
- NFL draft: 2022: undrafted

Career history
- Indianapolis Colts (2022)*; Pittsburgh Maulers (2023); Michigan Panthers (2024); New Orleans Saints (2024)*; Michigan Panthers (2025)
- * Offseason or practice squad member only

Samson Lionel Nacua (born January 20, 1998) is an American professional football wide receiver. He played college football for the Utah Utes and the BYU Cougars.

== Early life ==
Nacua attended high school at Timpview. Coming out of high school, Nacua decided to commit to play college football for the Utah Utes as a walk-on.

== College career ==
=== Utah ===
In the 2016 season, During the offseason, Nacua earned a scholarship and used the season to redshirt. During Nacua's first collegiate season in 2017, he notched 29 receptions for 294 yards and a touchdown. In the 2018 season, Nacua hauled in 31 receptions for 362 yards and five touchdowns. During the 2019 season, Nacua played in all 14 games for the Utes, totaling 18 receptions for 330 yards and four touchdowns. In the 2020 season, Nacua played in just two games where he made four catches for 29 yards and a touchdown. After the conclusion of the 2020 season, Nacua decided to enter his name into the NCAA transfer portal.

=== BYU ===
Nacua decided to transfer to play for the BYU Cougars with his brother Puka. In Nacua's final collegiate season in 2021, he played in all 13 games for BYU where he tallied 21 receptions for 329 yards and three touchdowns.

== Professional career ==
Pre-draft measurables
Height	Weight	Arm length	Hand span	Wingspan	40-yard dash	10-yard split	20-yard split	20-yard shuttle	Three-cone drill	Vertical jump	Broad jump	Bench press
6 ft 2 7/8 in (1.90 m)	206 lb (93 kg)	32 1/4 in (0.82 m)	9 in (0.23 m)	6 ft 5 7/8 in (1.98 m)	4.52 s	1.56 s	2.60 s	4.40 s	6.75 s	32.0 in (0.81 m)	10 ft 1 in (3.07 m)	16 reps
All values from Pro Day

=== Indianapolis Colts ===
After not being selected in the 2022 NFL draft, Nacua signed with the Indianapolis Colts as an undrafted free agent. However, Nacua was released by the Colts on August 30, 2022, during final roster cuts.

=== Pittsburgh Maulers ===
After being released by the Colts, Nacua signed with the Pittsburgh Maulers of the USFL, where he played in two games.

=== Michigan Panthers (first stint) ===
For the 2024 season, Nacua signed with the Michigan Panthers of the UFL where he notched 11 receptions for 125 yards.

=== New Orleans Saints ===
On August 2, 2024, Nacua signed with the New Orleans Saints, returning back to the NFL. He was waived on August 27.

=== Michigan Panthers (second stint) ===
On September 23, 2024, Nacua re-signed with the Michigan Panthers, joining brother, Kai Nacua.

On April 26, 2025, Nacua was involved with an incident involving a fan following the Panthers' Week 5 loss to the St. Louis Battlehawks. Nacua was seen with teammate Adonis Alexander talking to the fan when Nacua struck the fan across the face. The UFL ultimately suspended Nacua for one game due to his actions. He finished the 2025 season with 9 catches, for 121 yards, and 2 touchdowns in 9 games played.

=== Birmingham Stallions ===
On January 13, 2026, Nacua was selected by the Birmingham Stallions in the 2026 UFL Draft.

== Personal life ==
Nacua has three brothers who all played football, his two oldest Kai and Isaiah both played for the BYU Cougars. Kai eventually went on to play in the NFL. His younger brother Puka played college football with Nacua at BYU and is currently a Pro Bowl wide receiver for the Los Angeles Rams.

=== 2025 SUV stealing incident ===
In December 2025, Nacua was arrested by the Los Angeles Sheriff's Department for allegedly stealing a vehicle. The vehicle was an SUV that belonged to NBA player Adou Thiero, which was eventually tracked down to the One Hotel in West Hollywood, where Samson was identified on security footage after valeting the car and was promptly apprehended. Nacua, and accomplice Trey Rose, were both charged with joyriding.
