= 2011 Notre Dame Fighting Irish football team =

American college football season

2011 Notre Dame Fighting Irish football

Champs Sports Bowl, L 14–18 vs. Florida State
- Conference: Independent
- Record: 8–5
- Head coach: Brian Kelly (2nd season)
- Offensive coordinator: Charley Molnar (2nd season)
- Offensive scheme: Spread
- Defensive coordinator: Bob Diaco (2nd season)
- Base defense: 3–4
- MVP: Michael Floyd
- Captain: Harrison Smith
- Home stadium: Notre Dame Stadium

2011 NCAA Division I FBS independents football records
	Conf.			Overall
Team	W		L	W		L
BYU		–		10	–	3
Notre Dame		–		8	–	5
Navy		–		5	–	7
Army		–		3	–	9
Rankings from AP Poll

The 2011 Notre Dame Fighting Irish football team was an American football team that represented the University of Notre Dame as an independent during the 2011 NCAA Division I FBS football season. In their second year under head coach Brian Kelly, the Irish compiled an 8–5 record, outscored opponents by a total of 380 to 269, and were unranked in the final AP and Coaches Polls. They lost the two opening games against unranked South Florida and unranked Michigan, the rivalry game with USC, and the two final games against No. 4 Stanford and No. 25 Florida State, the latter in the Champs Sports Bowl.

Wide receiver Michael Floyd led the team with 100 receptins for 1,147 yard and was selected as the team's most valuable player for the second consecutive year. The team's other statistical leaders included quarterback Tommy Rees (2,871 passing yards), running back Cierre Wood (1,102 rushing yards), linebacker Manti Te'o (128 total tackles), and kicker David Ruffer (77 points scored, 47 of 47 extra points, 10 of 16 field goals).

The team played its home games at Notre Dame Stadium in Notre Dame, Indiana.

== Schedule ==
Date	Time	Opponent	Rank	Site	TV	Result	Attendance	Source
September 3	3:30 p.m.	South Florida	No. 16	Notre Dame Stadium; Notre Dame, IN	NBC	L 20–23	80,795	
September 10	8:00 p.m.	at Michigan		Michigan Stadium; Ann Arbor, MI (rivalry)	ESPN	L 31–35	114,804	
September 17	3:30 p.m.	No. 15 Michigan State		Notre Dame Stadium; Notre Dame, IN (rivalry)	NBC	W 31–13	80,795	
September 24	12:00 p.m.	at Pittsburgh		Heinz Field; Pittsburgh, PA (rivalry)	ABC	W 15–12	65,050	
October 1	8:00 p.m.	at Purdue		Ross–Ade Stadium; West Lafayette, IN (rivalry)	ESPN	W 38–10	61,555	
October 8	3:30 p.m.	Air Force		Notre Dame Stadium; Notre Dame, IN (rivalry)	NBC	W 59–33	80,795	
October 22	7:30 p.m.	USC		Notre Dame Stadium; South Bend, IN (rivalry)	NBC	L 17–31	80,795	
October 29	3:30 p.m.	Navy		Notre Dame Stadium; Notre Dame, IN (rivalry)	NBC	W 56–14	80,795	
November 5	8:00 p.m.	at Wake Forest		BB&T Field; Winston-Salem, NC	ABC	W 24–17	36,307	
November 12	7:30 p.m.	vs. Maryland		FedExField; Landover, MD (Shamrock Series)	NBC	W 45–21	70,251	
November 19	4:00 p.m.	Boston College	No. 24	Notre Dame Stadium; Notre Dame, IN (Holy War)	NBC	W 16–14	80,795	
November 26	8:00 p.m.	at No. 4 Stanford	No. 22	Stanford Stadium; Stanford, CA (rivalry)	ABC	L 14–28	50,360	
December 29	5:30 p.m.	vs. No. 25 Florida State		Florida Citrus Bowl; Orlando, FL (Champs Sports Bowl) (rivalry)	ESPN, ESPN 3D	L 14–18	68,305	
Rankings from AP Poll released prior to the game; All times are in Eastern time

== Preseason ==
Before the season started, Kerry Cooks took over as cornerback coach after coaching the outside linebackers the previous season. Defensive coordinator Bob Diaco, who also coached the inside linebackers, became coach of the entire linebacking corps. Chuck Martin was assigned responsibility for the safeties and as recruiting coordinator.

Also prior to the season, tight end Kyle Rudolph chose to forgo his final year of eligibility and entered the 2011 NFL draft. Other players lost to graduation included defensive lineman Ian Williams, cornerback Darrin Walls, and running backs Robert Hughes and Armando Allen. Redshirt junior quarterback Nate Montana left the program in early February 2011, and transferred to the University of Montana.

Also prior to the season, the following players were named to award watch lists:

- Braxston Cave – Rimington Trophy
- Dayne Crist – Davey O'Brien Award, Maxwell Award
- Tyler Eifert – Mackey Award
- Michael Floyd – Biletnikoff Award, Maxwell Award
- Zack Martin – Outland Trophy
- David ruffer – Groza Award
- Harrison Smith – Nagurski Award, Thorpe Award
- Manti Te'o – Bednarik Award, Butkus Award, Lombardi Award, Nagurski Award,
- Cierre Wood – Doak Walker Award

== Game summaries ==
=== South Florida ===
- Game Captains: Trevor Robinson, Robert Blanton

South Florida at Notre Dame

Team	1	2	3	4	Total
• Bulls	13	3	0	7	23
Fighting Irish	0	0	7	13	20

- Date: September 3
- Location: Notre Dame Stadium
  South Bend, IN
- Game start: 3:30 EST
- Elapsed time: 5:59
- Game attendance: 80,795
- Game weather: 93 degrees, W 6 MPH, 2 Severe Weather Delays
- Referee: Dennis Hennigan Big East
- TV announcers (NBC): Dan Hicks, Mike Mayock & Alex Flanagan

Scoring summary
1	11:00	USF	Kayvon Webster 96-yard fumble return (Maikon Bonani kick)	USF 7–0
1	4:45	USF	Maikon Bonani 49-yard field goal	USF 10–0
1	1:08	USF	Maikon Bonani 17-yard field goal	USF 13–0
2	4:04	USF	Maikon Bonani 16-yard field goal	USF 16–0
3	7:12	ND	Michael Floyd 24-yard pass from Tommy Rees (David Ruffer kick)	USF 16–7
4	11:05	USF	Evan Landi 2-yard pass from B. J. Daniels (Maikon Bonani kick)	USF 23–7
4	7:35	ND	Cierre Wood 1-yard run (pass failed)	USF 23–13
4	0:21	ND	Michael Floyd 8-yard pass from Tommy Rees (David Ruffer kick)	USF 23–20

=== Michigan ===
- Game Captain: Zach Martin
Notre Dame at Michigan "Under The Lights"
(Michigan – Notre Dame rivalry game)

Team	1	2	3	4	Total
Fighting Irish	14	3	7	7	31
• Wolverines	0	7	0	28	35

- Date: September 10
- Location: Michigan Stadium
  Ann Arbor, MI
- Game start: 8:00 p.m. EST
- Elapsed time: 3:30
- Game attendance: 114,804
- Game weather: High 60s, ESE 4 MPH
- Referee: Tom Tomczyk Big East
- TV announcers (ESPN): Brent Musburger, Kirk Herbstreit & Erin Andrews

=== Michigan State ===
- Game Captain: Ethan Johnson
Michigan State at Notre Dame
(Megaphone Trophy)

Team	1	2	3	4	Total
Spartans	3	7	0	3	13
• Fighting Irish	14	7	7	3	31

- Date: September 17
- Location: Notre Dame Stadium
  South Bend, IN
- Game start: 3:30 p.m. EST
- Elapsed time: 3:19
- Game attendance: 80,795
- Game weather: 68 Degrees, SE 8 MPH
- Referee: John O'Neill Big 10
- TV announcers (NBC): Tom Hammond, Mike Mayock & Alex Flanagan

Scoring summary
1	10:41	ND	Cierre Wood 22-yard run (David Ruffer kick)	ND 7–0
1	1:32	MSU	Dan Conroy 40-yard field goal	ND 7–3
1	1:20	ND	George Atkinson III 89-yard kickoff return (David Ruffer kick)	ND 14–3
2	11:57	MSU	Dion Sims 6-yard pass from Kirk Cousins (Dan Conroy kick)	ND 14–10
2	3:36	ND	Cierre Wood 6-yard run (David Ruffer kick)	ND 21–10
3	9:30	ND	TJ Jones 26-yard pass from Tommy Rees (David Ruffer kick)	ND 28–10
4	10:56	MSU	Dan Conroy 35-yard field goal	ND 28–13
4	3:11	ND	David Ruffer 33-yard field goal	ND 31–13

=== Pittsburgh ===
- Game Captain: Taylor Dever
Notre Dame at Pittsburgh

Team	1	2	3	4	Total
• Fighting Irish	0	7	0	8	15
Panthers	3	3	6	0	12

- Date: September 24
- Location: Heinz Field
  Pittsburgh, PA
- Game start: 12:00 p.m. EST
- Elapsed time: 3:17
- Game attendance: 65,050
- Game weather: 64 Degrees, NE 2 MPH
- Referee: John McDade Big East
- TV announcers (ABC): Dave Pasch, Chris Spielman, Urban Meyer & Quint Kessenich

=== Purdue ===
- Game Captain: Tyler Eifert
Notre Dame at Purdue

Team	1	2	3	4	Total
• Notre Dame	14	7	14	3	38
Purdue	0	3	0	7	10

- Date: October 1
- Location: Ross-Ade Stadium
  West Lafayette, IN
- Game start: 8:00 p.m. EST EST
- Elapsed time: 3:21
- Game attendance: 61,555
- Game weather: 50 Degrees, NNW 4 MPH
- Referee: Jerry McGinn Big East
- TV announcers (ESPN): Brad Nessler, Todd Blackledge & Holly Rowe

Scoring summary
1	14:36	ND	Michael Floyd 35-yard pass from Tommy Rees (David Ruffer kick)	ND 7–0
1	0:03	ND	Jonas Gray 3-yard run (David Ruffer kick)	ND 14–0
2	9:06	ND	Cierre Wood 55-yard run (David Ruffer kick)	ND 21–0
2	3:39	PUR	Carson Wiggs 27-yard field goal	ND 21–3
3	12:00	ND	Tyler Eifert 6-yard pass from Tommy Rees (David Ruffer kick)	ND 28–3
3	2:07	ND	TJ Jones 11-yard pass from Tommy Rees (David Ruffer kick)	ND 35–3
4	8:06	ND	David Ruffer 21-yard field goal	ND 38–3
4	0:21	PUR	Antavian Edison 13-yard pass from Caleb TerBush (Carson Wiggs kick)	ND 38–10

=== Air Force ===
- Game Captain: Jonas Gray
Air Force at Notre Dame

Team	1	2	3	4	Total
Falcons	3	13	0	17	33
• Fighting Irish	21	21	7	10	59

- Date: October 8
- Location: Notre Dame Stadium
  South Bend, IN
- Game start: 3:30 EST
- Elapsed time: 3:23
- Game attendance: 80,795
- Game weather: 81 degrees, S 9 MPH
- Referee: Greg Burks Mountain West Conference
- TV announcers (NBC): Tom Hammond, Mike Mayock & Alex Flanagan

Scoring summary
1	12:13	ND	Michael Floyd 34-yard pass from Tommy Rees (David Ruffer kick)	ND 7–0
1	8:21	ND	Tyler Eifert 5-yard pass from Tommy Rees (David Ruffer kick)	ND 14–0
1	5:48	AF	Parker Herrington 34-yard field goal	ND 14–3
1	4:07	ND	Robby Toma 10-yard pass from Tommy Rees (David Ruffer kick)	ND 21–3
2	13:41	AF	Tim Jefferson 3-yard run (kick blocked)	ND 21–9
2	11:39	ND	Jonas Gray 5-yard run (David Ruffer kick)	ND 28–9
2	6:10	ND	Cierre Wood 8-yard run (David Ruffer kick)	ND 35–9
2	1:41	AF	Ty MacArthur 6-yard pass from Tim Jefferson (Parker Herrington kick)	ND 35–16
2	0:32	ND	Theo Riddick 24-yard run (David Ruffer kick)	ND 42–16
3	6:49	ND	Jonas Gray 6-yard run (David Ruffer kick)	ND 49–16
4	14:56	AF	Parker Herrington 32-yard field goal	ND 49–19
4	10:12	ND	David Ruffer 39-yard field goal	ND 52–19
4	6:22	ND	George Atkinson III 1-yard run (Mike Grieco kick)	ND 59–19
4	4:32	AF	Drew Coleman 36-yard pass from Connor Dietz (Anthony Lacoste run)	ND 59–27
4	0:33	AF	Jonathan Lee 8-yard run (run failed)	ND 59–33

=== USC ===
- Game Captain: Manti Te'o, Cierre Wood
USC at Notre Dame

Team	1	2	3	4	Total
• Trojans	14	3	7	7	31
Fighting Irish	0	10	0	7	17

- Date: October 22
- Location: Notre Dame Stadium
  South Bend, IN
- Game start: 7:30 EST
- Elapsed time: 3:10
- Game attendance: 80,795
- Game weather: 36 degrees
- Referee: Land Clark Pac-12
- TV announcers (NBC): Tom Hammond, Mike Mayock & Alex Flanagan

=== Navy ===
Game Captain: Chris Salvi

Navy at Notre Dame

Team	1	2	3	4	Total
Midshipmen	0	7	0	7	14
• Fighting Irish	14	21	7	14	56

- Date: October 29
- Location: Notre Dame Stadium
  South Bend, IN
- Game start: 3:30 EST
- Elapsed time: 3:06
- Game attendance: 80,795
- Game weather: 54 Degrees
- Referee: Ron Cherry
- TV announcers (NBC): Tom Hammond, Mike Mayock & Alex Flanagan

Scoring summary
1	4:52	ND	Jonas Gray 1-yard run (David Ruffer kick)	Notre Dame 7–0
1	0:31	ND	Cierre Wood 1-yard run (David Ruffer kick)	Notre Dame 14–0
2	11:06	NAVY	Gee Gee Greene 9-yard pass from Trey Miller (Jon Teague kick)	Notre Dame 14–7
2	10:51	ND	Michael Floyd 56-yard pass from Tommy Rees (David Ruffer kick)	Notre Dame 21–7
2	9:07	ND	Jonas Gray 2-yard run (David Ruffer kick)	Notre Dame 28–7
2	3:37	ND	Cierre Wood 1-yard run (David Ruffer kick)	Notre Dame 35–7
3	2:59	ND	Michael Floyd 10-yard run (David Ruffer kick)	Notre Dame 42–7
4	13:38	ND	Jonas Gray 5-yard run (David Ruffer kick)	Notre Dame 49–7
4	9:25	NAVY	Jarvis Cummings 12-yard run (Jon Teague kick)	Notre Dame 49–14
4	3:49	ND	George Atkinson III 1-yard run (David Ruffer kick)	Notre Dame 56–14

=== Wake Forest ===
Game Captain: Robert Blanton

Notre Dame at Wake Forest

Team	1	2	3	4	Total
• Fighting Irish	10	0	14	0	24
Demon Deacons	10	7	0	0	17

- Date: November 5
- Location: BB&T Field
  Winston-Salem, NC
- Game start: 8:00 p.m. EST
- Game attendance: 36,307
- Referee: Dennis Hennigan Big East
- Television network: ABC/ESPN2

Scoring summary
1	10:52	WAKE	Brandon Pendergrass 20-yard pass from Tanner Price (Jimmy Newman kick)	WAKE 7–0
1	6:15	ND	David Ruffer 44-yard field goal	WAKE 7–3
1	4:07	WAKE	Jimmy Newman 46-yard field goal	WAKE 10–3
1	3:38	ND	Tyler Eifert 38-yard pass from Tommy Rees (David Ruffer kick)	Tied 10–10
2	0:28	WAKE	Josh Harris 2-yard run (Jimmy Newman kick)	WAKE 17–10
3	12:54	ND	Jonas Gray 1-yard run (David Ruffer kick)	Tied 17–17
3	9:04	ND	Michael Floyd 16-yard pass from Tommy Rees (David Ruffer kick)	ND 24–17

=== Maryland ===
Game Captain: Darius Fleming

Notre Dame vs Maryland
(Shamrock Series)

Team	1	2	3	4	Total
Terrapins	0	7	0	14	21
• Fighting Irish	10	14	14	7	45

- Date: November 12
- Location: Fed Ex Field
  Landover, MD
- Game start: 7:30 p.m. EST
- Elapsed time: 3:03
- Game attendance: 70,251
- Game weather: 51 Degrees
- Referee: Tom Tomczyk Big East
- TV announcers (NBC): Tom Hammond, Mike Mayock & Alex Flanagan

Scoring summary
1	11:25	ND	Jonas Gray 1-yard run (David Ruffer kick)	ND 7–0
1	2:47	ND	David Ruffer 52-yard field goal	ND 10–0
2	8:29	ND	Michael Floyd 19-yard pass from Tommy Rees (David Ruffer kick)	ND 17–0
2	5:18	MD	Quintin McCree 13-yard pass from Danny O'Brien (Nick Ferrara kick)	ND 17–7
2	0:29	ND	Jonas Gray 1-yard run (David Ruffer kick)	ND 24–7
3	8:48	ND	Cierre Wood 3-yard run (David Ruffer kick)	ND 31–7
3	7:18	ND	Lo Wood 57-yard interception return (David Ruffer kick)	ND 38–7
4	14:02	MD	C. J. Brown 2-yard run (Nick Ferrara kick)	ND 38–14
4	5:31	ND	Tyler Eifert 34-yard pass from Tommy Rees (David Ruffer kick)	ND 45–14
4	0:37	MD	D.J. Adams 2-yard run (Nick Ferrara kick)	ND 45–21

Despite the game being played only 12 miles from the Maryland campus, both end zones read "Notre Dame" and the majority of the fans in attendance were supporting the Fighting Irish. Notre Dame wore their green jerseys along with large green shamrocks on their side of their gold helmets.

=== Boston College ===
Notre Dame vs Boston College

Team	1	2	3	4	Total
Eagles	0	7	0	7	14
• Fighting Irish	10	3	0	3	16

- Date: November 19
- Location: Notre Dame Stadium
  South Bend, IN
- Game start: 4:00 p.m. EST
- Elapsed time: 3:22
- Game attendance: 80,795
- Game weather: 51
- Referee: Brad Allen ACC
- TV announcers (NBC): Tom Hammond, Mike Mayock & Alex Flanagan

Scoring summary
1	12:38	ND	Jonas Gray 26-yard run (David Ruffer kick)	ND 7–0
1	8:15	ND	David Ruffer 40-yard field goal	ND 10–0
2	3:04	BC	Josh Bordner 2-yard run (Nate Freese kick)	ND 10–7
2	1:19	ND	David Ruffer 41-yard field goal	ND 13–7
4	8:08	ND	David Ruffer 27-yard field goal	ND 16–7
4	1:57	BC	Bobby Swigert 7-yard pass from Chase Rettig (Nate Freese kick)	ND 16–14

=== Stanford ===
Game Captain: Taylor Dever

Notre Dame vs Stanford

Team	1	2	3	4	Total
Fighting Irish	0	0	7	7	14
• Cardinal	7	14	0	7	28

- Date: November 26
- Location: Stanford Stadium
  Stanford, CA
- Game start: 8:00 p.m. EST
- Elapsed time: 3:23
- Game attendance: 50,360
- Game weather: 58 Degrees
- Referee: John Mcdaid Big East
- TV announcers (ABC): Brent Musburger, Kirk Herbstreit

Scoring summary
1	9:16	STAN	Levine Toilolo 3-yard pass from Andrew Luck (Jordan Williamson kick)	STAN 7–0
2	4:45	STAN	Coby Fleener 28-yard pass from Andrew Luck (Jordan Williamson kick)	STAN 14–0
2	0:10	STAN	Ty Montgomery 11-yard pass from Andrew Luck (Jordan Williamson kick)	STAN 21–0
3	6:21	ND	Michael Floyd 6-yard pass from Andrew Hendrix (David Ruffer kick)	STAN 21–7
4	5:40	STAN	Coby Fleener 55-yard pass from Andrew Luck (Jordan Williamson kick)	STAN 28–7
4	0:23	ND	Andrew Hendrix 2-yard run (David Ruffer kick)	STAN 28–14

=== Florida State ===
Game Captain: Michael Floyd

Notre Dame vs Florida State

Team	1	2	3	4	Total
• Seminoles	0	0	3	15	18
Fighting Irish	7	0	7	0	14

- Date: December 29
- Location: Citrus Bowl
  Orlando, FL
- Game start: 5:30 EST
- Referee: Reggie Smith Big 12 Conference
- TV announcers (ESPN): Joe Tessitore (Play-by-Play)
  Rod Gilmore (Color Analyst)
  Holly Rowe (Sideline)

Scoring summary
1	11:25	ND	Zeke Motta 29-yard fumble return (David Ruffer kick)	ND 7–0
3	9:04	ND	Michael Floyd 5-yard pass from Tommy Rees (David Ruffer kick)	ND 14–0
3	11:24	FSU	Dustin Hopkins 42-yard field goal	ND 14–3
4	14:54	FSU	Bert Reed 18-yard pass from EJ Manuel (Two-point conversion failed)	ND 14–9
4	13:18	FSU	Rashad Greene 15-yard pass from E.J. Manuel (Two-point conversion failed)	FSU 15–14
4	8:05	FSU	Dustin Hopkins 29-yard field goal	FSU 18–14

=== Rankings ===
Ranking movements Legend: ██ Increase in ranking ██ Decrease in ranking — = Not ranked RV = Received votes
	Week															
Poll	Pre	1	2	3	4	5	6	7	8	9	10	11	12	13	14	Final
AP	16	—	—	RV	RV	RV	RV	RV	RV	—	RV	RV	24	22	RV	
Coaches	18	—	—	RV	—	RV	RV	RV	RV	RV	RV	RV	25	24	RV	
Harris	Not released						RV	RV	RV	—	RV	RV	RV	23	RV	Not released
BCS	Not released							—	—	—	—	—	—	22	—	Not released

== Personnel ==
2011 Notre Dame Fighting Irish football team roster
Players
Coaches
Offense

Pos.	#	Name	Class
WR	1	Deion Walker	Sr
WR	3	Michael Floyd	Sr
RB	4	George Atkinson III	Fr
QB	5	Everett Golson	Fr
WR	6	Theo Riddick	Jr
WR	7	TJ Jones	So
WR	9	Robby Toma	Jr
QB	10	Dayne Crist	Sr
QB	11	Tommy Rees	So
QB	12	Andrew Hendrix	So
WR	14	Luke Massa	So
WR	16	DaVaris Daniels	Fr
QB	17	Matthew Mulvey	Sr
TE	18	Ben Koyack	Fr
RB	20	Cierre Wood	Jr
RB	25	Jonas Gray	Sr
RB	29	Patrick Coughlin	GS
RB	31	Cameron Roberson	So
RB	33	Cam McDaniel	Fr
WR	37	Eric Lee	Fr
WR	38	Nick Fitzpatrick	Jr
WR	39	Ryan Liebscher	So
WR	41	Matthias Farley	Fr
RB	49	Tyler Plantz	So
C	51	Bruce Heggie	So
C	52	Braxston Cave	Sr
OL	56	Brad Carrico	Fr
C	57	Mike Golic Jr.	Sr
OL	62	Matt Tansey	Jr
OT	64	Tate Nichols	So
G	65	Conor Hanratty	Fr
G	66	Chris Watt	Jr
OT	70	Zack Martin	Jr
OT	71	Dennis Mahoney	Sr
OL	72	Nick Martin	Fr
OT	73	Lane Clelland	Sr
OT	74	Christian Lombard	So
OT	75	Taylor Dever	GS
G	76	Andrew Nuss	GS
OT	77	Matt Hegarty	Fr
G	78	Trevor Robinson	Sr
OT	79	Jordan Prestwood	Fr
TE	80	Tyler Eifert	Jr
WR	81	John Goodman	Sr
TE	82	Alex Welch	So
TE	83	Mike Ragone	GS
WR	85	Ryan Sharpley	Sr
TE	86	Arturo Martinez	So
WR	87	Daniel Smith	So
TE	88	Jake Golic	Jr

Defense

Pos.	#	Name	Class
OLB	1	Ishaq Williams	Fr
CB	2	Bennett Jackson	So
CB	4	Gary Gray	GS
MLB	5	Manti Te'o	Jr
DE	7	Stephon Tuitt	Fr
MLB	8	Kendall Moore	So
NG	9	Louis Nix III	So
CB	12	Robert Blanton	Sr
OLB	13	Danny Spond	So
S	15	Dan McCarthy	Sr
S	17	Zeke Motta	Jr
DE	19	Aaron Lynch	Fr
CB	21	Jalen Brown	Fr
S	22	Harrison Smith	GS
CB	23	Lo Wood	So
S	24	Chris Salvi	Sr
S	26	Jamoris Slaughter	Sr
S	28	Austin Collinsworth	So
OLB	30	Ben Councell	Fr
CB	32	Andrew Plaska	Sr
S	34	Eilar Hardy	Fr
DB	35	Joe Romano	So
MLB	36	David Posluszny	Sr
MLB	38	Joe Schmidt	Fr
CB	39	Ryan Sheehan	Sr
S	40	Connor Cavalaris	Fr
CB	42	Nick Lezynski	GS
CB	43	Josh Atkinson	Fr
MLB	44	Carlo Calabrese	Jr
OLB	45	Darius Fleming	Sr
OLB	46	Steve Filer	Sr
OLB	47	Jonathan Frantz	Sr
OLB	48	Dan Fox	Jr
S	49	Blake Breslau	Jr
DE	50	Chase Hounshell	Fr
MLB	50	Sean Oxley	Sr
MLB	53	Justin Utupo	So
MLB	54	Anthony McDonald	Sr
MLB	55	Prince Shembo	So
MLB	56	Anthony Rabasa	Fr
OLB	58	Troy Niklas	Fr
MLB	59	Jarrett Grace	Fr
DE	69	Tony Springmann	Fr
DE	89	Kapron Lewis-Moore	Sr
DE	90	Ethan Johnson	Sr
NG	92	Tyler Stockton	Jr
LB	93	Connor Little	Fr
NG	94	Hafis Williams	Sr
DE	96	Kona Schwenke	So
DT	98	Sean Cwynar	Jr
NG	99	Brandon Newman	Sr

Special teams

Pos.	#	Name	Class
K	27	Kyle Brindza	Fr
P	35	Ben Turk	Jr
P	37	Mike Grieco	Sr
K	40	Nick Tausch	Jr
LS	50	Ryan Kavanagh	Sr
LS	60	Jordan Cowart	Jr
K	97	David Ruffer	GS

Head coach

- Brian Kelly

Coordinators/assistant coaches

- Bob Diaco – Defensive Coordinator/Inside Linebackers
- Paul Longo – Director of Football Strength and Conditioning
- Charley Molnar – Offensive Coordinator/Quarterbacks
- Tony Alford – Wide Receivers
- Kerry Cooks – Cornerbacks
- Mike Denbrock – Tight Ends
- Mike Elston – Defensive Line/Special Teams Coordinator
- Tim Hinton – Running Backs
- Chuck Martin – Safeties/Recruiting Coordinator
- Ed Warinner – Offensive Line/Running Game Coordinator
- Jon Carpenter – Defensive Graduate Assistant
- Michael Painter – Defensive Graduate Assistant
- Tim Collins – Video Coordinator
- Julie DeBuysser – Senior Staff Assistant-Offensive Coaches
- Karen Demeter – Recruiting Services Coordinator
- Chad Klunder – Director of Football Operations
- Tim McDonnell – Director of Football Personnel
- David Peloquin – Director of Football Development
- Beth Rex – Director of Football Administration
- Joy Schosker – Senior Staff Assistant

Legend

- (C) Team captain
- (S) Suspended
- (I) Ineligible
- Injured
- Redshirt

Roster

=== Recruiting ===
With his first full recruiting class, Brian Kelly added 23 prospects to the football team, including the addition of five early-enrollees: defensive end Aaron Lynch, outside linebacker Ishaq Williams, offensive lineman Brad Carrico, quarterback Everett Golson, and kicker Kyle Brindza.

College recruiting (2011)
Name	Hometown	School	Height	Weight	40^{‡}	Commit date
George Atkinson III; WR/RB	Livermore, CA	Granada HS	6 ft 2 in (1.88 m)	195 lb (88 kg)	4.5	Sep 12, 2010
George Atkinson III; WR/RB	Recruit ratings: Scout: Rivals: (79)					
Josh Atkinson; DB	Livermore, CA	Granada HS	6 ft 0 in (1.83 m)	180 lb (82 kg)	4.4	Sep 12, 2010
Josh Atkinson; DB	Recruit ratings: Scout: Rivals: (78)					
Kyle Brindza; K	Canton, OH	Plymouth Canton HS	6 ft 2 in (1.88 m)	195 lb (88 kg)	–	Apr 15, 2010
Kyle Brindza; K	Recruit ratings: Scout: Rivals: (79)					
Jalen Brown; DB	Irving, TX	Irving MacArthur HS	6 ft 0 in (1.83 m)	173 lb (78 kg)	4.4	Jul 31, 2010
Jalen Brown; DB	Recruit ratings: Scout: Rivals: (78)					
Brad Carrico; DE	Dublin, OH	Dublin Coffman HS	6 ft 6 in (1.98 m)	270 lb (120 kg)	4.8	Mar 20, 2010
Brad Carrico; DE	Recruit ratings: Scout: Rivals: (77)					
Ben Councell; LB	Asheville, NC	A.C. Reynolds HS	6 ft 5 in (1.96 m)	225 lb (102 kg)	4.4	Jun 27, 2010
Ben Councell; LB	Recruit ratings: Scout: Rivals: (79)					
DaVaris Daniels; WR	Vernon Hills, IL	Vernon Hills HS	6 ft 3 in (1.91 m)	190 lb (86 kg)	4.5	Sep 28, 2010
DaVaris Daniels; WR	Recruit ratings: Scout: Rivals: (81)					
Matthias Farley; ATH/CB	Charlotte, NC	Charlotte Christian HS	6 ft 0 in (1.83 m)	194 lb (88 kg)	4.5	Apr 21, 2010
Matthias Farley; ATH/CB	Recruit ratings: Scout: Rivals: (77)					
Everett Golson; QB/ATH	Myrtle Beach, SC	Myrtle Beach HS	6 ft 0 in (1.83 m)	170 lb (77 kg)	–	Dec 2, 2010
Everett Golson; QB/ATH	Recruit ratings: Scout: Rivals: (80)					
Jarrett Grace; LB	Cincinnati, OH	Colerain HS	6 ft 4 in (1.93 m)	240 lb (110 kg)	4.6	Apr 24, 2010
Jarrett Grace; LB	Recruit ratings: Scout: Rivals: (78)					
Conor Hanratty; OL	New Canaan, CT	New Canaan HS	6 ft 4 in (1.93 m)	305 lb (138 kg)	5.8	Apr 24, 2010
Conor Hanratty; OL	Recruit ratings: Scout: Rivals: (76)					
Eilar Hardy; DB	Pickerington, OH	Central HS	6 ft 1 in (1.85 m)	175 lb (79 kg)	4.5	Jun 25, 2010
Eilar Hardy; DB	Recruit ratings: Scout: Rivals: (79)					
Matthew Hegarty; OL	Aztec, NM	Aztec HS	6 ft 5 in (1.96 m)	265 lb (120 kg)	5.0	Apr 28, 2010
Matthew Hegarty; OL	Recruit ratings: Scout: Rivals: (82)					
Chase Hounshell; OL	Kirtland, OH	Lake Catholic HS	6 ft 5 in (1.96 m)	242 lb (110 kg)	4.8	Jan 17, 2011
Chase Hounshell; OL	Recruit ratings: Scout: Rivals: (76)					
Ben Koyack; TE	Oil City, PA	Oil City Senior HS	6 ft 5 in (1.96 m)	230 lb (100 kg)	4.6	Apr 27, 2010
Ben Koyack; TE	Recruit ratings: Scout: Rivals: (81)					
Aaron Lynch; DE	Cape Coral, FL	Island Coast HS	6 ft 6 in (1.98 m)	245 lb (111 kg)	4.7	Jan 18, 2011
Aaron Lynch; DE	Recruit ratings: Scout: Rivals: (84)					
Nick Martin; OL	Indianapolis, IN	Bishop Chatard HS	6 ft 5 in (1.96 m)	260 lb (120 kg)	–	Jan 11, 2011
Nick Martin; OL	Recruit ratings: Scout: Rivals: (78)					
Cam McDaniel; RB	Coppell, TX	Coppell HS	5 ft 11 in (1.80 m)	192 lb (87 kg)	4.5	Nov 29, 2010
Cam McDaniel; RB	Recruit ratings: Rivals: (77)					
Troy Niklas; OL	Anaheim, CA	Servite HS	6 ft 7 in (2.01 m)	243 lb (110 kg)	4.7	Feb 2, 2011
Troy Niklas; OL	Recruit ratings: Scout: Rivals: (79)					
Anthony Rabasa; DE	Miami, FL	Columbus HS	6 ft 3 in (1.91 m)	220 lb (100 kg)	–	Jul 30, 2010
Anthony Rabasa; DE	Recruit ratings: Scout: Rivals: (80)					
Tony Springmann; DE	Fort Wayne, IN	Bishop Dwenger HS	6 ft 6 in (1.98 m)	257 lb (117 kg)	4.8	Apr 24, 2010
Tony Springmann; DE	Recruit ratings: Scout: Rivals: (78)					
Stephon Tuitt; DE	Monroe, GA	Monroe Area HS	6 ft 5 in (1.96 m)	260 lb (120 kg)	–	Jan 19, 2011
Stephon Tuitt; DE	Recruit ratings: Scout: Rivals: (81)					
Ishaq Williams; DE	Brooklyn, NY	Abraham Lincoln HS	6 ft 6 in (1.98 m)	230 lb (100 kg)	4.7	Jan 14, 2011
Ishaq Williams; DE	Recruit ratings: Scout: Rivals: (82)					
Overall recruit ranking: Scout: 11 Rivals: 10 ESPN: 9
‡ Refers to 40-yard dash; Note: In many cases, Scout, Rivals, 247Sports, On3, and ESPN may conflict in their listings of height, weight and 40 time.; In these cases, the average was taken. ESPN grades are on a 100-point scale.; Sources: "Notre Dame Commit List 2011". Rivals.; "Scout.com Football Recruiting: Notre Dame". Scout.; "2011 Player Commitments – Notre Dame". ESPN.; "Scout.com Team Recruiting Rankings". Scout.; "2011 Team Ranking". Rivals.com.

== Statistics ==
Passing

1. Tommy Rees - 269 of 411 (65.5%) for 2,871 yards, 20 touchdowns, 14 interceptions, and a 133.4 passer rating.
2. Andrew Hendrix - 18 of 37 (48.6%) for 249 yards, 1 touchdown, 2 interceptions, and a 133.4 passer rating.
3. Dayne Crist - 15 of 24 (62.5%) for 164 yards, 0 touchdowns, 1 interception, 111.7 passer rating

Rushing

1. Cierre Wood - 1,102 yards on 217 carries, 5.1-yard average, 9 touchdowns
2. Jonas Gray - 791 yards on 114 carries, 6.9-yard average, 12 touchdowns
3. Andrew Hendrix - 162 yards on 25 carries, 6.5-yard average, 1 touchdown

Receptions

1. Michael Floyd (WR) - 100 reeptions for 1,147 yards, 11.5-yard average, 9 touchdowns
2. Tyler Eifert (TE) - 68 receptions for 803 yards, 12.7-yard average, 5 touchdowns
3. Theo Riddick (WR) - 38 receptions for 436 yards, 11.5-yard average, 3 touchdowns
4. T.J. Jones (WR) - 19 receptions for 207 yards, 10.9-yard average, 3 touchdowns
5. Robby Toma (WR) - 19 receptions for 207 yards, 10.9-yard average, 1 touchdown
6. Cierre Wood (RB) - 27 receptions for 189 yards, 7.0-yard average, 0 touchdowns

Scoring

1. David Ruffer (K) - 77 points, 47 of 47 PAT, 10 of 16 field goals
2. Jonas Gray (RB) - 72 points, 12 touchdowns
3. Michael Floyd (WR) - 60 points, 10 touchdowns
4. Cierre Wood (RB) - 54 points, 9 touchdowns
5. Tyler Eifert (TE) - 30 points, 5 touchdowns
6. George Atkinson III (RB) - 24 points, 4 touchdowns

Tackles

1. Manti Te'o (LB) - 128 total tackles, 62 solo tackles, 13.5 tackles for loss, 5.0 sacks
2. Harrison Smith (DB) - 90 total tackles, 53 solo tackles
3. Robert Blanton (DB) - 70 total tackles, 48 solo tackles, 8.0 tackles for loss, 1.0 sack
4. Gary Gray (DB) - 67 total tackles, 48 solo tackles
5. Darius Fleming (LB) - 55 total tackles, 24 solo tackles, 7.0 tackles for loss, 3.5 sacks

== Awards and honors ==
Wide receiver Michael Floyd was selected by his teammates as the team's most valuable player. It was Floyd's second consecutive year with the honor. Floyd was also a semifinalist for the Biletnikoff Award.

Tight end Tyler Eifert was a finalist for the John Mackey Award.

All-Americans

Name	AP	AFCA	FWAA	SN	WCFF	Athlon	CBS	CFN	ESPN	PFW	Rivals	Scout	SI	Yahoo
George Atkinson III, KR													Hon. Mention	
Tyler Eifert, TE	2				2					Hon. Mention	3	1	Hon. Mention	3
Michael Floyd, WR										Hon. Mention			Hon. Mention	
Manti Te'o, LB	2				2						2	2	2	2
†denotes consensus selection. NCAA recognizes AP, AFCA, FWAA, SN and WCFF 1st teams for consensus selections
