= 2012 Notre Dame Fighting Irish football team =

American college football season

2012 Notre Dame Fighting Irish football

National champion (Colley)

BCS National Championship Game, L 14–42 (vacated) vs. Alabama
- Conference: Independent

Ranking
- Coaches: No. 3
- AP: No. 4
- Record: 0–0, 12 wins and 1 loss vacated
- Head coach: Brian Kelly (3rd season)
- Offensive coordinator: Chuck Martin (1st season)
- Offensive scheme: Spread
- Defensive coordinator: Bob Diaco (3rd season)
- Co-defensive coordinator: Kerry Cooks (3rd season)
- Base defense: 3–4
- Captains: Tyler Eifert; Kapron Lewis-Moore; Zack Martin; Manti Te'o
- Home stadium: Notre Dame Stadium

2012 NCAA Division I FBS independents football records
	Conf.			Overall
Team	W		L	W		L
BYU		–		8	–	5
Navy		–		8	–	5
Army		–		2	–	10
No. 4 Notre Dame %		–		0*	–	0
% – BCS at-large representative; *All wins and national championship appearance for Notre Dame (12–1) in the 2012 season were vacated; Rankings from AP Poll

The 2012 Notre Dame Fighting Irish football team was an American football team that represented the University of Notre Dame as an independent during the 2012 NCAA Division I FBS football season. In their third year under head coach Brian Kelly, the Irish ended the regular season with a 12–0 record and lost to 2012 Alabama Crimson Tide football team in the BCS National Championship Game. The team outscored opponents by a total of 335 to 166 and was ranked No. 4 in the final AP poll and No. 3 in the final Coaches Poll.

Linebacker Manti Te'o was a unanimous All-American and won multiple postseason awards, including the Maxwell Award, the Walter Camp Award, the Lott Trophy, the Chuck Bednarik Award, the Bronko Nagurski Trophy, the Butkus Award, and the Lombardi Award. and finished second to Johnny Manziel in the Heisman Trophy voting. Te'o led the second best defense in the country, giving up just 12.8 points per game. Other statistical leaders included quarterback Everett Golson (2,405 passing yards), running back Theo Riddick (917 rushing yards), and tight end Tyler Eifert (50 receptions for 684 yards).

In November 2016, the NCAA infractions panel vacated all wins from Notre Dame's 2012 and 2013 seasons based on its finding that ineligible students had played for the 2012 and 2013 teams. A student athletic trainer committed academic misconduct, including completing coursework, for two players and provided impermissible academic extra benefits to six other players. Another player was found to have committed academic misconduct on his own in a total of eight courses. The penalties were upheld after an appeal by Notre Dame.

The team played its home games at Notre Dame Stadium in Notre Dame, Indiana.

== Schedule ==
Date	Time	Opponent	Rank	Site	TV	Result	Attendance
September 1	9:00 a.m.	vs. Navy		Aviva Stadium; Dublin, Ireland (Emerald Isle Classic, rivalry)	CBS	W 50–10 (vacated)	48,820
September 8	3:30 p.m.	Purdue	No. 22	Notre Dame Stadium; Notre Dame, IN (rivalry)	NBC	W 20–17 (vacated)	80,795
September 15	8:00 p.m.	at No. 10 Michigan State	No. 20	Spartan Stadium; East Lansing, MI (rivalry)	ABC	W 20–3 (vacated)	79,219
September 22	7:30 p.m.	No. 18 Michigan	No. 11	Notre Dame Stadium; Notre Dame, IN (rivalry)	NBC	W 13–6 (vacated)	80,795
October 6	7:30 p.m.	vs. Miami (FL)	No. 9	Soldier Field; Chicago, IL (Shamrock Series) (rivalry)	NBC	W 41–3 (vacated)	62,871
October 13	3:30 p.m.	No. 17 Stanford	No. 7	Notre Dame Stadium; Notre Dame, IN (rivalry, College GameDay)	NBC	W 20–13 ^{OT} (vacated)	80,795
October 20	3:30 p.m.	BYU	No. 5	Notre Dame Stadium; Notre Dame, IN	NBC	W 17–14 (vacated)	80,795
October 27	8:00 p.m.	at No. 8 Oklahoma	No. 5	Gaylord Family Oklahoma Memorial Stadium; Norman, OK	ABC	W 30–13 (vacated)	86,031
November 3	3:30 p.m.	Pittsburgh	No. 3	Notre Dame Stadium; Notre Dame, IN (rivalry)	NBC	W 29–26 ^{3OT} (vacated)	80,795
November 10	8:00 p.m.	at Boston College	No. 4	Alumni Stadium; Chestnut Hill, MA (Holy War)	ABC	W 21–6 (vacated)	44,500
November 17	3:30 p.m.	Wake Forest	No. 3	Notre Dame Stadium; Notre Dame, IN	NBC	W 38–0 (vacated)	80,795
November 24	8:00 p.m.	at USC	No. 1	Los Angeles Memorial Coliseum; Los Angeles, CA (rivalry)	ABC	W 22–13 (vacated)	93,607
January 7, 2013	8:30 p.m.	vs. No. 2 Alabama	No. 1	Sun Life Stadium; Miami Gardens, FL (BCS National Championship Game)	ESPN	L 14–42 (vacated)	80,120
Rankings from AP Poll released prior to the game; All times are in Eastern time

== Before the season ==
Senior quarterback Dayne Crist was granted a release from the team in December 2011 to explore transfer options. He decided to join his former Notre Dame head coach, Charlie Weis, at the Kansas. Aaron Lynch also transferred out of the program to USF.

Running backs coach Tim Hinton and offensive line and run game coordinator Ed Warriner left to take positions with Ohio State. Offensive coordinator and quarterbacks coach Charley Molnar left to take the head coach position at UMass.

There were also coaching changes within the staff. Bob Diaco became assistant head coach. Chuck Martin took over as offensive coordinator and quarterbacks coach. Scott Booker was promoted from being an intern to tight ends and special teams coach. There were some outside hires to fill positions on the staff as well. Bob Elliott was hired from Iowa State to coach the safeties, and Harry Hiestand was hired from Tennessee to be offensive line coach and run game coordinator.

== Rankings ==
Ranking movements Legend: ██ Increase in ranking ██ Decrease in ranking RV = Received votes ( ) = First-place votes
	Week															
Poll	Pre	1	2	3	4	5	6	7	8	9	10	11	12	13	14	Final
AP	RV	22	20	11	10	9	7	5	5	4	4	3 (1)	1 (60)	1 (60)	1 (60)	4
Coaches	24	22	19	15	11	10	7	5	5	4	4	3 (1)	1 (56)	1 (56)	1 (56)	3
Harris	Not released						7	5	5	4	4	3 (1)	1 (107)	1 (109)	1 (106)	Not released
BCS	Not released							5	5	3	4	3	1	1	1	Not released

== Game summaries ==
=== Navy (Emerald Isle Classic) ===
Emerald Isle Classic

Team	1	2	3	4	Total
• #22 Fighting Irish	13	14	13	10	50
Midshipmen	0	3	7	0	10

- Date: September 1
- Location: Aviva Stadium
  Dublin, Ireland
- Game start: 2:06 pm (9:06 am)
- Elapsed time: 3:19
- Game attendance: 48,820
- Game weather: Temp: 66 • Wind: WSW 19 • Weather: Mostly cloudy
- Referee: John McDaid
- TV announcers (CBS): Verne Lundquist, Gary Danielson, Tracy Wolfson & David Feherty

Scoring summary
1	9:12	ND	Theo Riddick 11-yard run (kick failed)	Notre Dame 6–0
1	3:02	ND	George Atkinson III 56-yard run (Nick Tausch kick)	Notre Dame 13–0
2	11:20	ND	Tyler Eifert 5-yard pass from Everett Golson (Nick Tausch kick)	Notre Dame 20–0
2	2:12	ND	Stephon Tuitt 77-yard fumble return (Nick Tausch kick)	Notre Dame 27–0
2	:00	NAVY	Nick Sloan 26-yard field goal	Notre Dame 27–3
3	14:03	NAVY	Shawn Lynch 25-yard pass from Trey Miller (Nick Sloan kick)	Notre Dame 27–10
3	8:45	ND	George Atkinson III 3-yard run (run failed)	Notre Dame 33–10
3	4:06	ND	Theo Riddick 3-yard run (Nick Tausch kick)	Notre Dame 40–10
4	5:54	ND	Nick Tausch 34-yard field goal	Notre Dame 43–10
4	:39	ND	Robby Toma 9-yard run (Nick Tausch kick)	Notre Dame 50–10

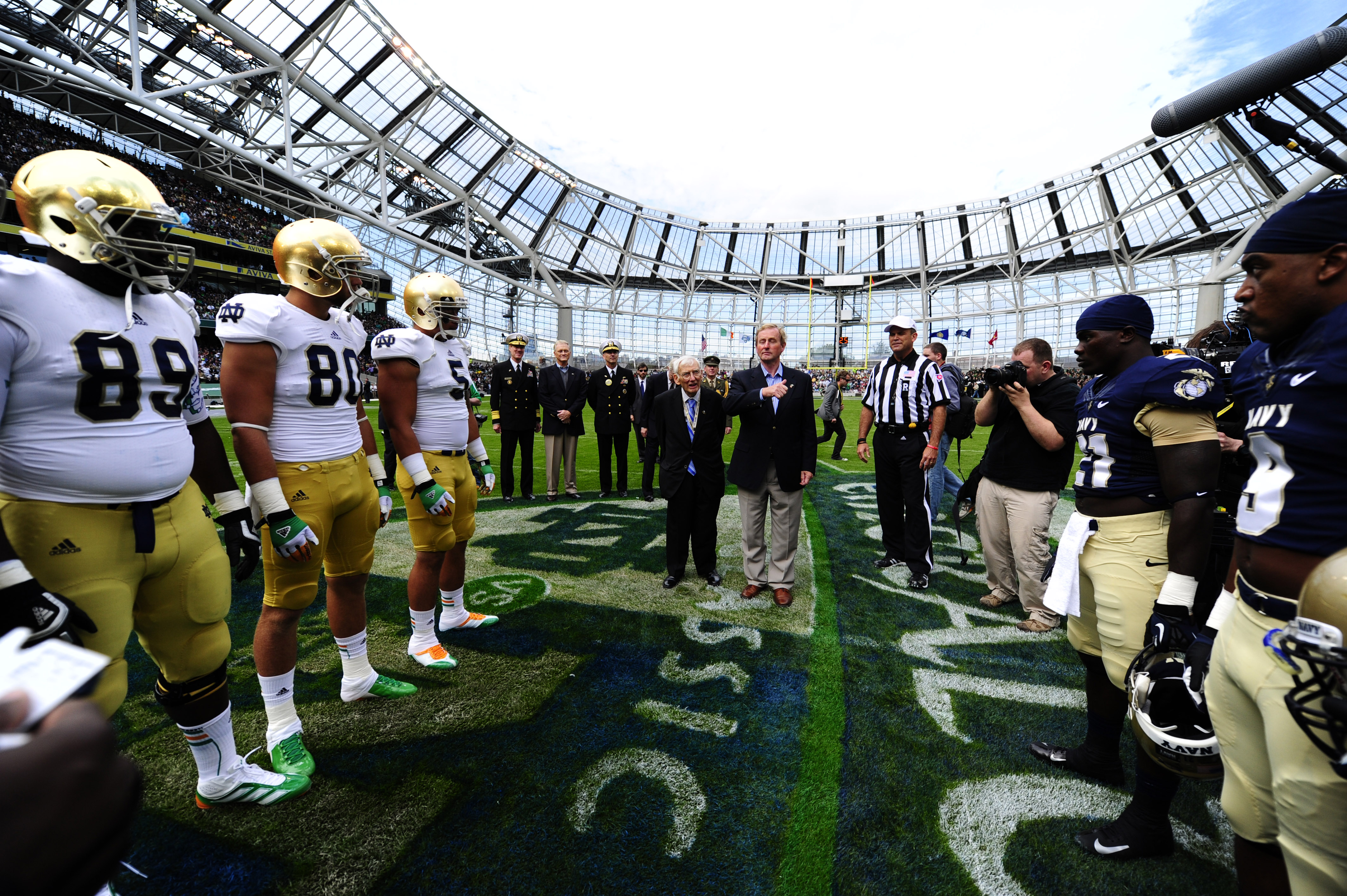
Notre Dame and Navy captains take part in the opening coin toss.

Irish running backs Theo Riddick and George Atkinson both ran for two scores and defensive end Stephon Tuitt returned a fumble 77 yards for another TD as Notre Dame routed Navy 50–10 in Notre Dame's season opener in Ireland. A crowd of 49,000, mostly visiting Americans, filled Dublin's Aviva Stadium for the first U.S. college game in Ireland since 1996, when the same two teams played in the Emerald Isle Classic at Croke Park. The Fighting Irish dominated the game, running the ball for 293 yards and 6.4 yards per carry against Navy's defense. Riddick gained 107 yards on 19 carries, Atkinson 99 yards on just nine carries. Irish quarterback Everett Golson, making his first start, put the Fighting Irish up 27–0 with a 5-yard end zone jump ball to tight end Tyler Eifert, who beat two smaller Navy defenders. Navy managed a 26-yard field goal before halftime and opened the second half with a nifty three-pass drive capped by Shawn Lynch's 25-yard grab to make it 27–10 but could get no closer.

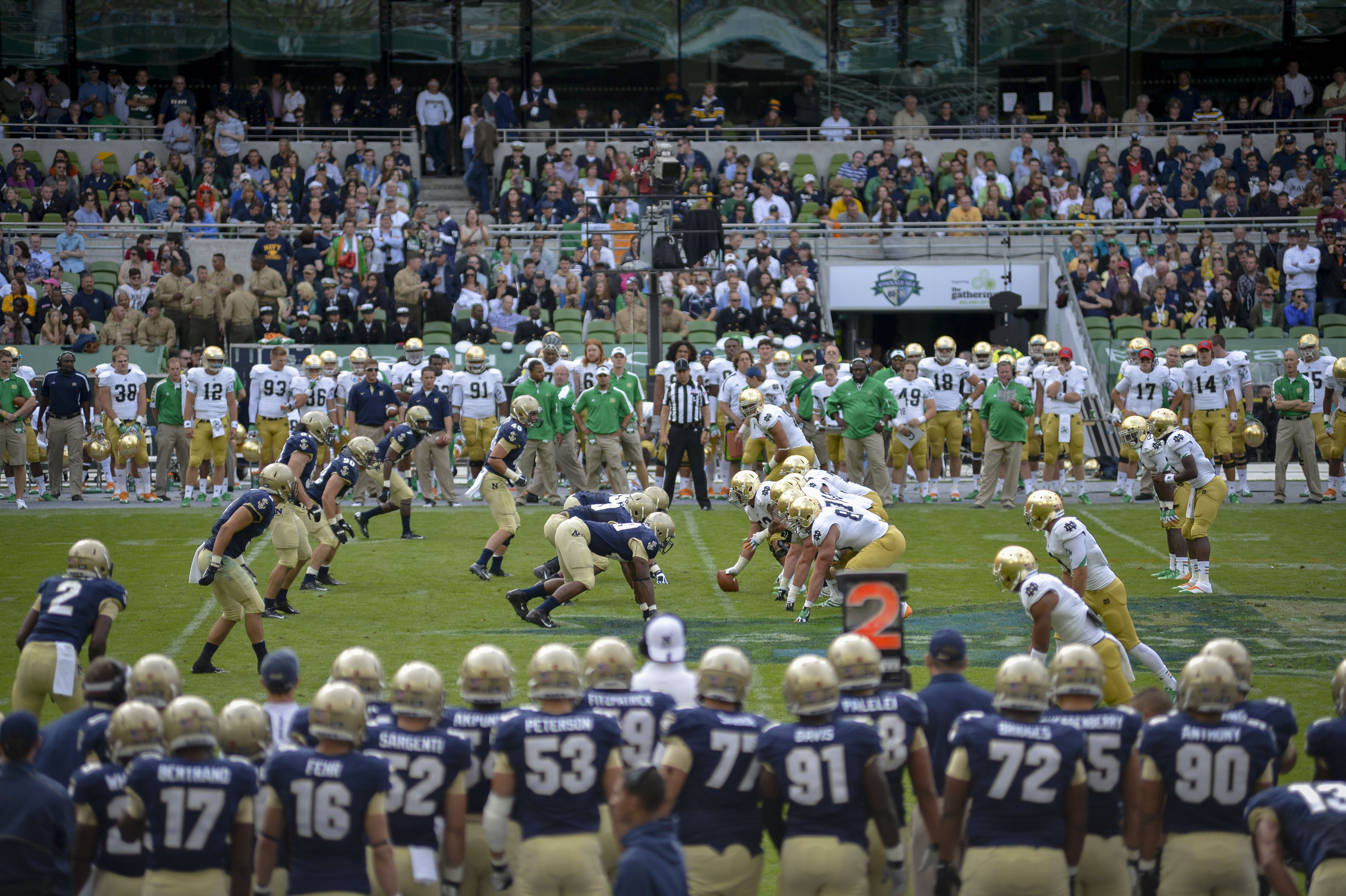
Notre Dame and Navy line up on scrimmage

Notre Dame's defensive leader, inside linebacker Manti Te'o, recovered one fumble and intercepted Navy quarterback Trey Miller's final pass of the day, an underthrown ball into triple coverage. Surprisingly, they were his first fumble recovery and interception, respectively, of his four-year Notre Dame career. Irish starters Tommy Rees and Carlo Calabrese did not make the trip due to violating team and university rules regarding an off campus incident with Indiana police last Spring. Cierre Wood, Notre Dame's starting running back from a year ago, also did not play due to being suspended the first two games of the season for violating team rules.

The game was officially tied to an Irish tourism initiative called The Gathering, which seeks to encourage members of the Irish diaspora (especially in the U.S.) to visit their ancestral home in 2013. Unlike the 1996 meeting, the 2012 game was aired live in parts of Europe as well as the U.S.

=== Purdue ===
Shillelagh Trophy

Team	1	2	3	4	Total
Boilermakers	0	7	0	10	17
• #19 Fighting Irish	0	7	10	3	20

- Date: September 8
- Location: Notre Dame Stadium
  South Bend, IN
- Game start: 3:40 pm
- Elapsed time: 3:33
- Game attendance: 80,795
- Game weather: Temp: 67 • Wind: NW 14 • Weather: Partly sunny
- Referee: John O'Neil
- TV announcers (NBC): Tom Hammond, Mike Mayock & Alex Flanagan

Scoring summary
2	3:45	ND	Everett Golson 3-yard run (Kyle Brindza kick)	Notre Dame 7–0
2	:09	PUR	Antavian Edison 2-yard pass from Robert Marve (Sam McCartney kick)	Tie 7–7
3	10:46	ND	T. J. Jones 3-yard pass from Everett Golson (Kyle Brindza kick)	Notre Dame 14–7
3	9:02	ND	Kyle Brindza 30-yard field goal	Notre Dame 17–7
4	14:57	PUR	Sam McCartney 33-yard field goal	Notre Dame 17–10
4	2:12	PUR	Antavian Edison 15-yard pass from Caleb TerBush (Sam McCartney kick)	Tie 17–17
4	:07	ND	Kyle Brindza 27-yard field goal	Notre Dame 20–17

Following Notre Dame's dominant performance against Navy, the Irish found themselves in a dogfight versus their in-state rival Purdue, a team they had beaten soundly the year before 38–10. After a scoreless first quarter, Irish quarterback Everett Golson led the Irish on an 88-yard scoring play in the second quarter with three big third-down conversions to take a 7–0 lead. Golson scrambled on the first one, avoided two rushers and then hit tight end Troy Niklas on a 30-yard pass. Three plays later, on another third down, he found DaVaris Daniels behind the Boilermaker defense for a 41-yard gain to the 9. On a third-and-goal, Golson rolled right and made a dive for the end zone as he was being hit right at the goal line. Officials initially ruled him out of bounds, but after a video review the call on the field was reversed and he was awarded a touchdown because he hit the pylon. The Boilermakers alternated quarterbacks Caleb TerBush and Robert Marve throughout the game. Marve led the Boilermakers on a quick 58-yard scoring drive at the end of the first half that started with Raheem Mostert's 41-yard kickoff return. Marve then hit O. J. Ross with a 16-yarder and, on a third-and-goal from the 2, he found Antavian Edison in the corner of the end zone with nine seconds to play in the half to tie the game at 7–7.

In the third quarter, Golson found tight end Tyler Eifert for passes of 22 and 25 yards that carried them to the 3-yard line, where he tossed a touchdown pass to T. J. Jones for a 14–7 lead. The Irish would also add a Kyle Brindza field goal in the third quarter to take a 17–7 lead. in the fourth quarter, Purdue came roaring back with a field goal and then a TerBush 15-yard TD pass to Edison with 2:12 left to tie the game at 17–17. The late score was set up by Josh Johnson's recovery of a Golson fumble. Golson was shaken up on the play and having trouble gripping the ball, so the Irish turned to Tommy Rees, who was returning from a one-game suspension as a second stringer. The former starting quarterback got one chance and produced a last-minute drive that led to a 20–17 victory over the Boilermakers on Kyle Brindza's 27-yard field goal with seven seconds to go.

=== Michigan State ===
Megaphone Trophy

Team	1	2	3	4	Total
• #17 Fighting Irish	7	7	0	6	20
#10 Spartans	0	3	0	0	3

- Date: September 15
- Location: Spartan Stadium
  East Lansing, MI
- Game start: 8:12 pm
- Elapsed time: 3:21
- Game attendance: 79,219
- Game weather: Temp: 68 • Wind: NE 2 • Weather: Clear
- Referee: Dennis Hennigan
- TV announcers (ABC): Brent Musburger, Kirk Herbstreit & Heather Cox

No. 20 Notre Dame got off to its best start since 2002, beating No. 10 Michigan State 20–3 in East Lansing. The win marked the first time Notre Dame had beaten a top 10 squad since defeating Michigan in 2005. Everett Golson threw a touchdown pass and ran for a score in the first half to help down the Spartans. Golson was 14 of 32 for 178 yards and a TD, including 36-yard pass to John Goodman. He ran for a 6-yard TD early in the second quarter to give Notre Dame a 14–0 lead. The Irish shook off a sloppy start that included George Atkinson running into a teammate on a kickoff return, a false start and a timeout before their first snap. The Irish defense was dominant, sacking Spartan quarterback Andrew Maxwell three times in the second quarter alone. The Spartans were held to 77 total yards rushing and 178 yards passing and 3 total points.

Late in the 4th quarter, the Irish extended their lead when Kyle Brindza made a 29-yard field goal at the end of a time-consuming drive that took 6:21 off the clock and extended the score to 17–3. Michigan State's slim comeback hopes were dashed when Spartan running back Le'Veon Bell was going out of bounds and his lateral was caught by linebacker Manti Te'o with 4:20 left in the game to set up Brindza's 47-yard field goal that provided the 20–3 final score. Te'o also had a game-high 12 tackles, one for a loss, and broke up two passes, playing just a few days after the supposed death of his girlfriend, who he believed had lost a long battle with leukemia, and his grandmother. The Irish improved to 46–28–1 against the Spartans and broke the Spartans' 15-home game winning streak.

=== Michigan ===
Rivalry Game

Team	1	2	3	4	Total
#17 Wolverines	0	0	0	6	6
• #11 Fighting Irish	0	10	0	3	13

- Date: September 22
- Location: Notre Dame Stadium
  South Bend, IN
- Game start: 7:40 pm
- Elapsed time: 3:10
- Game attendance: 80,795
- Game weather: Temp: 53 • Wind: W 7 • Weather: Partly cloudy
- Referee: Bill LeMonnier
- TV announcers (NBC): Tom Hammond, Mike Mayock & Alex Flanagan

Scoring summary
2	10:09	ND	Kyle Brindza 33-yard field goal	Notre Dame 3–0
2	1:21	ND	Tommy Rees 1-yard run (Kyle Brindza kick)	Notre Dame 10–0
4	13:10	MICH	Brendan Gibbons 33-yard field goal	Notre Dame 10–3
4	6:46	ND	Kyle Brindza 39-yard field goal	Notre Dame 13–3
4	3:27	MICH	Brendan Gibbons 31-yard field goal	Notre Dame 13–6

After three consecutive last second Wolverine victories over the Irish, Notre Dame's defense stifled a 17th-ranked Denard Robinson led Michigan squad in a 13–6 victory. Manti Te'o led the Irish defensive effort with two interceptions as the 11th-ranked Fighting Irish picked off five Michigan passes and forced a fumble. Irish backup quarterback Tommy Rees sparked the Notre Dame offense after a shaky start by Everett Golson, who threw two interceptions of his own before being pulled by Coach Brian Kelly. Robinson, who amassed 948 yards of total offense in victories over the Irish past two years, wasn't as effective this time around as the Irish repeatedly forced him into mistakes. He threw four interceptions in the first half, then lost a fumble at the Notre Dame 8-yard line on the first drive of the second half.

The victory sent the Irish off to their best start (4–0) since 2002. The win also ended a streak of three straight games in which Michigan beat the Irish with a score in the final 27 seconds, the last two Michigan victories with Robinson at quarterback. Robinson finished 13-of-24 passing for 138 yards and also rushed for 90 yards on 26 carries. The victory belonged to the Irish defenders, who held a nationally ranked opponent without a touchdown for a second straight week. Te'o finished with eight tackles, and safety Bennett Jackson had nine tackles, an interception and a fumble recovery. The Irish fans showed support for Te'o by wearing Hawaiian leis, after Te'o had suffered the death of his grandmother and girlfriend the previous week.

=== Miami (Shamrock Series) ===
Shamrock Series

Team	1	2	3	4	Total
Hurricanes	3	0	0	0	3
• #10 Fighting Irish	7	6	21	7	41

- Date: October 6
- Location: Soldier Field
  Chicago, IL
- Game start: 6:39 pm (7:39 pm)
- Elapsed time: 3:14
- Game attendance: 62,871
- Game weather: Temp: 44 • Wind: NW 5 • Weather: Cloudy
- Referee: Jeff Flanagan
- TV announcers (NBC): Tom Hammond, Mike Mayock & Alex Flanagan

Scoring summary
1	9:28	ND	Theo Riddick 1-yard run (Kyle Brindza kick)	Notre Dame 7–0
1	5:32	MIA	Jake Wieclaw 28-yard field goal	Notre Dame 7–3
2	14:10	ND	Kyle Brindza 22-yard field goal	Notre Dame 10–3
2	5:07	ND	Kyle Brindza 32-yard field goal	Notre Dame 13–3
3	11:57	ND	Cierre Wood 2-yard run (Kyle Brindza kick)	Notre Dame 20–3
3	2:53	ND	Cierre Wood 3-yard run (Kyle Brindza kick)	Notre Dame 27–3
3	:23	ND	George Atkinson III 55-yard run (Kyle Brindza kick)	Notre Dame 34–3
4	1:06	ND	Cam McDaniel 1-yard run (Kyle Brindza kick)	Notre Dame 41–3

=== Stanford ===
#17 Stanford Cardinal (4–1) at #7 Notre Dame Fighting Irish (5–0)

Quarter	1	2	3	4	OT	Total
Stanford	0	10	0	3	0	13
Notre Dame	3	0	0	10	7	20

at Notre Dame Stadium, South Bend, Indiana

- Date: October 13, 2012
- Game time: 3:30 p.m. EST
- Game weather: Rain, 53 °F (12 °C)
- Game attendance: 80,795
- Referee: Shawn Hochuli
- TV announcers (NBC): Tom Hammond, Mike Mayock, and Alex Flanagan
- Box Score

Game information

First quarter

- ND – Kyle Brindza 29-yard field goal, 0:36. Notre Dame 3–0. Drive: 4 plays, 4 yards, 0:51.

Second quarter

- STAN – Fumble recovered in end zone by Chase Thomas (Jordan Williamson kick), 6:06. Stanford 7–3.
- STAN – Jordan Williamson 48-yard field goal, 0:00. Stanford 10–3. Drive: 7 plays, 44 yards, 1:34.

Fourth quarter

- ND – Tyler Eifert 24-yard pass from Everett Golson (Kyle Brindza kick), 14:15. Tie 10–10. Drive: 8 plays, 52 yards, 4:18.
- STAN – Jordan Williamson 27-yard field goal, 6:12. Stanford 13–10. Drive: 16 plays, 65 yards, 8:03.
- ND – Kyle Brindza 22-yard field goal, 0:20. Tie 13–13. Drive: 12 plays, 79 yards, 5:52.

Overtime

- ND – TJ Jones 7-yard pass from Tommy Rees (Kyle Brindza kick). Notre Dame 20–13. Drive: 4 plays, 25 yards.

Top passers

- STAN – Josh Nunes – 12/25, 125 yards, 2 INT
- ND – Everett Golson – 12/24, 141 yards, TD

Top rushers

- STAN – Stepfan Taylor – 28 rushes, 102 yards
- ND – Cierre Wood – 12 rushes, 66 yards

Top receivers

- STAN – Zach Ertz – 4 receptions, 55 yards
- ND – Tyler Eifert – 4 receptions, 57 yards, TD

The Irish defense once again proved to be the strength of the 2012 Notre Dame team, stuffing Stanford on a classic goal line stand in an overtime thriller to down the Cardinal by a score of 20–13. After three years of being pushed around by the Cardinal, the Fighting Irish pushed back, winning the most important shoving match they had all season. A wall of Notre Dame defenders stopped Stanford running back Stepfan Taylor inches from the end zone on fourth and goal. Taylor went up the middle and was knocked back, but kept reaching and turning with bodies underneath him. It was unclear if his knee ever did hit the ground before reaching the ball across the goal line, but the officials on the field ruled Taylor's forward progress to be stopped before crossing the goal line. The celebration by the Irish crowd of 80,795 had to wait for a replay review. The call stood. Irish fans who weren't already on the field spilled out of the stands in celebration of the win.

Early on the game was a defensive battle. Notre Dame defensive tackle Stephon Tuitt was in the Stanford backfield all day and Manti Te'o was all over Stanford ball carriers. On the Cardinal side, Shayne Skov and Ben Gardner gave Irish quarterback Everett Golson and the Irish very little room to operate. Golson was inconsistent with his play, completing 12 of 24 for 141 yards and a touchdown. He also lost two key fumbles – one that Stanford's Chase Thomas recovered in the end zone in the second quarter for a touchdown and the other in the third that gave the Cardinal the ball back after Golson had made a long run deep into Stanford territory. Thomas' touchdown put Stanford up 7–3, the first time all season Notre Dame had trailed in a game. Notre Dame finally found the end zone on the first play of the fourth quarter. On a third-and-18 from the 24, Golson lofted a pass to the front corner of the end zone that the 6-foot-6 Irish tight end Tyler Eifert came down with for a 10–10 tie.

The Cardinal responded with their best drive of the game, a 16-play, 65-yard march that took 8:03 off the clock and reached the Notre Dame 3. The Irish got a stop on third down and Stanford had to settle for a field goal to take a three-point lead. On the ensuing possession, Golson would start the Irish drive down the field to tie or take the lead, but he took a helmet to the head during the drive to knock him out the game with concussion-like symptoms. Brian Kelly would again turn to Irish back up quarterback Tommy Rees, who had previously relieved Golson in the Purdue game and lead the Irish to a three-point win. Rees again responded to get the Irish into field goal range, completing an 11-yard pass to Eifert, and then, on third-and-4 from the 28, Eifert drew a pass-interference call on Terrence Brown that gave the Irish a first down at the 13. The Irish settled for Kyle Brindza's 22-yard field goal with 20 seconds left to tie it at 13. TJ Jones made a reaching 7-yard touchdown catch from Rees on the first overtime possession to give the Fighting Irish a 20–13 lead. Then the Fighting Irish defense, which had not given up a touchdown in four straight games, made its stand.

=== BYU ===
Team	1	2	3	4	Total
Cougars	0	14	0	0	14
• #5 Fighting Irish	7	0	3	7	17

- Date: October 20
- Location: Notre Dame Stadium
  South Bend, IN
- Game start: 3:40 pm
- Elapsed time: 3:04
- Game attendance: 80,795
- Game weather: Temp: 55 • Wind: W 14 • Weather: Partly sunny
- Referee: Jeff Maconaghy
- TV announcers (NBC): Tom Hammond, Mike Mayock & Alex Flanagan

The Irish rushed for 270 yards against a Cougars defense that entered the game third in the nation against the rush. Theo Riddick ran for a career-high 143 yards, Cierre Wood ran for 114 yards and George Atkinson III scored the go-ahead touchdown as the Irish rallied for a 17–14 win. In the 1st quarter, Tommy Rees threw a 4-yard touchdown pass to Tyler Eifert to give the Irish a 7–0 lead. In the 2nd quarter, BYU quarterback Riley Nelson threw a pair of touchdown passes, the first to Cody Hoffman to tie the game, the second to Kaneakua Friel to give the Cougars a 14–7 lead. In the 3rd quarter, Kyle Brindza kicked a 24-yard field goal to get the Irish within 14–10. Brindza had missed two field goals earlier in the game. In the 4th quarter, Atkinson's touchdown run gave the Irish a 17–14 lead.

=== Oklahoma ===
Team	1	2	3	4	Total
• #5 Fighting Irish	7	3	0	20	30
#8 Sooners	3	3	0	7	13

- Date: October 27
- Location: Oklahoma Memorial Stadium
  Norman, OK
- Game start: 7:12 pm (8:12 pm)
- Elapsed time: 3:23
- Game attendance: 86,031
- Game weather: Temp: 47 • Wind: NNE 3 • Weather: Clear
- Referee: Jerry McGinn
- TV announcers (ABC): Brent Musburger, Kirk Herbstreit & Heather Cox

Before the season began, the contest was regarded as one of the biggest games for both teams, and the Fighting Irish and Sooners did not disappoint. Both were regarded as dark horses for the national championship. Even though Notre Dame came in as the higher-rated team, many saw them as the underdog, due in part to the erratic play of starting quarterback Everett Golson. Using an up-tempo, no-huddle offense that forced the Notre Dame defense to play most of Oklahoma's first two drives out of their base package, Landry Jones led the Sooners down the field with ease. Only a bad snap on their first possession and a pass deflection in the red zone by Louis Nix on the second kept the Sooners from scoring more than a field goal halfway through the opening quarter. Notre Dame hit back two plays after falling behind 3–0, with Cierre Wood running up the middle for a 62-yard touchdown, the longest of the season for the Fighting Irish. The teams traded field goals in the second quarter, and the only other notable play took place near halftime, when an apparent Blake Bell touchdown was nullified by a holding call. Despite being down 10–6, Oklahoma had a 197–161 edge in yardage. Crucially however, the Sooners only had a net three rushing yards. On the Notre Dame side, Manti Te'o led all comers with 10 tackles and a sack, while Golson was putting together his most poised performance of the year.

Notre Dame missed a field goal at the end of a drive that consumed half of the third quarter, and the defense continued to stifle Oklahoma in the ground game, while surrendering yards but no points through the air. Early in the fourth quarter, Kyle Brindza made amends for he earlier miss by squeezing in a 44-yard field goal. A short punt on the next Irish possession gave Oklahoma a short field on which to respond. A 35-yard pass to Jalen Saunders and a surprise 4th down throw by Bell were key plays in setting up a 1-yard touchdown plunge by Bell, the first rushing score given up by the Notre Dame defense all season. It also ended an overall streak of 41 quarters without allowing a touchdown on the ground. Golson and the Irish responded immediately, with a 50-yard bomb to freshman speedster Chris Brown silencing the Oklahoma faithful. A few plays later, Golson put Notre Dame back on top 20–13 with a 1-yard burrowing run of his own.

The next Oklahoma drive produced the defining play of the game, as linebacker Dan Fox tipped the ball away from Saunders, and Te'o dove to snatch the interception only inches off the grass. This led to another Brindza field goal, and the Irish iced the game after gaining possession on downs, with a 15-yard jaunt by Theo Riddick accounting for the final margin of 30–13. Golson played his most complete game of the season, hitting 13 of 25 passes for 177 yards, while adding 64 yards and a touchdown rushing. Crucially, he did not turn the ball over once, with many of his incompletions occurring while throwing the ball away to avoid a sack or negative play; and the Irish converted nearly 50% of their third downs under his guidance. The Irish defense stood to the challenge as well, giving up no deep passing plays, and only 15 yards on the ground. The victory vaulted Notre Dame to No. 3 in the major polls.

=== Pittsburgh ===
Team	1	2	3	4	OT	2OT	3OT	Total
Panthers	3	7	10	0	3	0	3	26
• #4 Fighting Irish	3	3	0	14	3	0	6	29

- Date: November 3
- Location: Notre Dame Stadium
  South Bend, IN
- Game start: 3:40 pm
- Elapsed time: 4:07
- Game attendance: 80,795
- Game weather: Temp: 41 • Wind: N 7 • Weather: Partly cloudy
- Referee: Dennis Hennigan
- TV announcers (NBC): Dan Hicks, Mike Mayock & Alex Flanagan

Down 20–6 in the fourth quarter with its national title hopes on the line, Notre Dame rallied in triple overtime to defeat the Pitt Panthers and remain undefeated. Everett Golson scored on a quarterback sneak in the third overtime and the fourth-ranked Fighting Irish came back from a 14-point deficit for a 29–26 win.

Notre Dame avoided the fate of the 2002 team, the last Irish team to start a season 8–0, which was upset by Boston College 14–7. Brian Kelly pulled Golson late in the second quarter because he was missing reads and progressions. But the coach put Golson back in after backup Tommy Rees threw an interception, and the Irish fell behind by two touchdowns. A victory seemed unlikely when they fell behind 20–6 late in the third quarter. Golson threw an 11-yard touchdown pass to T. J. Jones early in the fourth quarter, as Notre Dame cut Pitt's lead to 20–12. Notre Dame's chances for a comeback appeared to end when Pitt cornerback K'Waun Williams intercepted a pass by Golson in the end zone. But the Irish defense held, and Golson completed a 45-yard pass to DaVaris Daniels on a broken play to get to the Pitt 5-yard line. Golson then threw a 5-yard touchdown pass to Theo Riddick and ran in for the two-point conversion to tie the game.

After the two teams traded field goals in the first overtime, Notre Dame looked poised to score for a victory, but running back Cierre Wood fumbled as he attempted to dive into the end zone in the second overtime and Pitt safety Jarred Holley recovered. But the Irish kept finding life, the last time when Kevin Harper missed a 33-yard field goal wide right following Wood's fumble. After Pitt would again kick a field goal in the third over time period, Golson would cap off the comeback with a 1-yard touchdown run. It was the fifth consecutive year that Notre Dame and Pittsburgh played a game decided by less than a touchdown – with two of those reaching overtime. Plus, of the last nine meetings between the schools, eight have been decided by eight points or fewer.

=== Boston College ===
Holy War

Team	1	2	3	4	Total
• #4 Fighting Irish	7	7	7	0	21
Eagles	0	3	0	3	6

- Date: November 10
- Location: Alumni Stadium
  Chestnut Hill, MA
- Game start: 8:12 pm
- Elapsed time: 3:13
- Game attendance: 44,500
- Game weather: Temp: 40 • Wind: SE 4 • Weather: Clear
- Referee: John McDaid
- TV announcers (ABC): Brent Musburger, Kirk Herbstreit & Heather Cox

=== Wake Forest ===
Team	1	2	3	4	Total
Demon Deacons	0	0	0	0	0
• #3 Fighting Irish	21	10	7	0	38

- Date: November 17
- Location: Notre Dame Stadium
  South Bend, IN
- Game start: 3:45 pm
- Elapsed time: 3:02
- Game attendance: 80,795
- Game weather: Temp: 54 • Wind: SE 6 • Weather: Sunny
- Referee: Gary Patterson
- TV announcers (NBC): Tom Hammond, Mike Mayock & Alex Flanagan

In 2011, Notre Dame won 24–17 in Winston-Salem. Notre Dame is now 2–0 against Wake Forest. With this victory, Notre Dame became this season's final undefeated major bowl-eligible team in college football.

=== USC ===
Jeweled Shillelagh

Team	1	2	3	4	Total
• #1 Fighting Irish	10	6	3	3	22
Trojans	0	10	0	3	13

- Date: November 24
- Location: Los Angeles Memorial Coliseum
  Los Angeles, CA
- Game start: 5:23 pm (8:23 pm)
- Elapsed time: 3:02
- Game attendance: 93,607
- Game weather: Temp: 66 • Wind: Calm • Weather: Fair and clear
- Referee: Dennis Hennigan
- TV announcers (ABC): Brent Musburger, Kirk Herbstreit & Heather Cox

Scoring summary
1	11:25	ND	Kyle Brindza 27-yard field goal	ND 3–0
1	1:48	ND	Theo Riddick 9-yard run (Kyle Brindza kick)	ND 10–0
2	14:55	USC	Robert Woods 11-yard pass from Max Wittek (Andre Heidari kick)	ND 10–7
2	9:19	ND	Kyle Brindza 29-yard field goal	ND 13–7
2	3:50	USC	Andre Heidari 39-yard field goal	ND 13–10
2	:00	ND	Kyle Brindza 52-yard field goal	ND 16–10
3	:31	ND	Kyle Brindza 33-yard field goal	ND 19–10
4	9:20	USC	Andre Heidari 21-yard field goal	ND 19–13
4	5:58	ND	Kyle Brindza 19-yard field goal	ND 22–13

For the first time since its 1988 championship season, Notre Dame came into the Los Angeles Coliseum with a No. 1 ranking and a chance to play for the national title on the line against its biggest rival, the Trojans of Southern California. USC, who had beaten the Irish nine out of the last ten meetings, often in a lopsided fashion, was playing the unfamiliar role of spoiler. Picked by the AP as the preseason No. 1 team, the Trojans came into the game unranked for only the second time since 2001. Complicating matters, USC had to play without its four-year starting quarterback, Matt Barkley, who was lost to injury just the week before against its cross-town rival UCLA. USC Coach Lane Kiffin elected to start redshirt freshman Max Wittek at quarterback, who despite some late-game heroics, was outmatched against the No. 1 ranked Irish defense. In the final minutes of the game, down nine points, Wittek connected with USC's All-America wide receiver Marqise Lee to put the Trojans at the one-yard line with a chance to close the score to a one possession game. Notre Dame's impenetrable defense appropriately made a decisive stand keeping USC out of the end zone on four plays from the Irish 1 with 2:33 to play. After three straight runs yielded minuscule gains, Wittek threw incomplete to fullback Soma Vainuku, setting off a celebration on the Notre Dame sideline and in the Irish sections of the sold-out stadium.

The 22–13 win secured Brian Kelly's Notre Dame squad a trip to Miami to play in the National Championship game, its first in 24 years. Running back Theo Riddick led the Irish ground attack with 146 yards and a touchdown, Kyle Brindza kicked five field goals, and Everett Golson passed for 217 yards as the Irish completed their first perfect regular season since 1988. Southern Cal's much-criticized defense was exploited by the Irish, with Golson patiently finding the gaps in the Trojans' pass coverage for 181 yards passing in the first half. Riddick went 9 yards for a TD in the first quarter, but USC also stiffened to hold Notre Dame to field goals twice in the red zone. The Notre Dame defense held its 12th straight opponent without a first-quarter touchdown, but Wittek found Robert Woods for a 9-yard score on the first play of the second quarter – just the ninth touchdown allowed by Notre Dame all season long. The Irish took a 16–10 lead to halftime when Brindza hit the second-longest field goal in Notre Dame history. Irish linebacker Manti Te'o made the seventh interception of his phenomenal season when Wittek threw directly to him on USC's second play of the second half. Both teams struggled to move the ball in the third quarter, and USC settled for a field goal with 9:20 to play just a few moments after Kiffin called a timeout right before a play that ended with Lee appearing to catch a pass on the goal line. The Irish out-gained the Trojans in total yards 493–281, and time of possession by 9 minutes, but repeatedly, the Irish had to settle for field goals in the red zone, putting the outcome of the game somewhat in doubt until the Irish's spectacular goal line stand.

The game was watched by 16.1 million viewers on television.

=== Alabama (BCS National Championship Game) ===
BCS National Championship Game

Team	1	2	3	4	Total
• #2 Crimson Tide	14	14	7	7	42
#1 Fighting Irish	0	0	7	7	14

- Date: Monday, January 7, 2013
- Location: Sun Life Stadium
  Miami Gardens, FL
- Game start: 8:30
- Elapsed time: 3:10
- Game attendance: 80,120
- Game weather: Temp: 73 • Wind: NE 5 • Weather: Mostly cloudy
- Referee: Land Clark (Pac-12)
- TV announcers (ESPN): Brent Musburger, Kirk Herbstreit, Heather Cox & Tom Rinaldi

Notre Dame's first time playing for the national championship since the 1988 season, when the Irish defeated West Virginia 34–21 at the Fiesta Bowl. Notre Dame was 5–1 all time vs. Alabama entering the game, while Alabama under Nick Saban had won two of the last three national championships. The Fighting Irish lost, 42–14.

== Personnel ==
2012 Notre Dame Fighting Irish football team roster
Players
Coaches
Offense

Pos.	#	Name	Class
QB	1	Gunner Kiel	Fr
WR	2	Chris Brown	Fr
RB	3	Amir Carlisle	So
RB	4	George Atkinson III	So
QB	5	Everett Golson	So
RB	6	Theo Riddick	Sr
WR	7	TJ Jones	Jr
WR	9	Robby Toma	Sr
WR	10	DaVaris Daniels	So
QB	11	Tommy Rees	Jr
QB	12	Andrew Hendrix	Jr
WR	14	Luke Massa	Jr
QB	17	Charlie Fiessinger	So
TE	18	Ben Koyack	So
WR	19	Davonte' Neal	Fr
RB	20	Cierre Wood	Sr
RB	32	Will Mahone	Fr
RB	33	Cam McDaniel	So
WR	37	Eric Lee	So
WR	38	Nick Fitzpatrick	Sr
WR	39	Ryan Liebscher	Jr
WR	46	Josh Anderson	Fr
RB	49	Tyler Plantz	Jr
C	51	Bruce Heggie	Jr
C	52	Braxston Cave	GS
C	57	Mike Golic Jr.	GS
OL	62	Matt Tansey	Sr
OT	64	Tate Nichols	Jr
C	65	Conor Hanratty	So
G	66	Chris Watt	Sr
OT	70	Zack Martin	Sr
OT	71	Dennis Mahoney	Sr
G	72	Nick Martin	So
OL	73	Dan Furlong	Fr
G	74	Christian Lombard	Jr
OL	75	Mark Harrell	Fr
C	77	Matt Hegarty	So
OT	78	Ronnie Stanley	Fr
TE	80	Tyler Eifert	Sr
WR	81	John Goodman	GS
WR	82	Justin Ferguson	Fr
TE	82	Alex Welch	Jr
WR	83	Gerard Martinez	Fr
WR	84	Andre Smith	So
TE	85	Troy Niklas	So
WR	87	Daniel Smith	Jr
TE	88	Jake Golic	Sr

Defense

Pos.	#	Name	Class
CB	2	Bennett Jackson	Jr
S	4	Eilar Hardy	So
MLB	5	Manti Te'o	Sr
CB	6	KeiVarae Russell	Fr
DE	7	Stephon Tuitt	So
MLB	8	Kendall Moore	Jr
NG	9	Louis Nix III	Jr
OLB	11	Ishaq Williams	So
OLB	13	Danny Spond	Jr
S	15	Dan McCarthy	GS
S	16	Chris Badger	Fr
S	17	Zeke Motta	Sr
CB	21	Jalen Brown	So
S	22	Elijah Shumate	Fr
CB	23	Lo Wood	Jr
S	24	Chris Salvi	Sr
S	26	Jamoris Slaughter	GS
S	28	Austin Collinsworth	Jr
S	29	Nicky Baratti	Fr
OLB	30	Ben Councell	So
S	31	John Turner	Fr
S	34	C.J. Prosise	Fr
CB	35	Joe Romano	Jr
CB	36	Will Salvi	Sr
MLB	38	Joe Schmidt	So
S	41	Matthias Farley	So
S	42	Ernie Soto	So
CB	43	Josh Atkinson	So
MLB	44	Carlo Calabrese	Sr
OLB	45	Romeo Okwara	Fr
S	46	Eamon McOsker	Fr
S	47	Connor Cavalaris	So
MLB	48	Dan Fox	Sr
S	49	Blake Breslau	Sr
DE	50	Chase Hounshell	So
DE	53	Justin Utupo	Jr
LB	54	Kevin Walsh	Sr
OLB	55	Prince Shembo	Jr
OLB	56	Anthony Rabasa	So
MLB	59	Jarrett Grace	So
DE	63	Grant Patton	Sr
DE	67	Kevin Carr	Jr
NG	69	Tony Springmann	So
DE	86	Arturo Martinez	Jr
DE	89	Kapron Lewis-Moore	GS
DE	91	Sheldon Day	Fr
NG	92	Tyler Stockton	Sr
OLB	93	Connor Little	So
DE	94	Jarron Jones	Fr
NG	96	Kona Schwenke	Jr

Special teams

Pos.	#	Name	Class
K	27	Kyle Brindza	So
P	35	Ben Turk	Sr
K	39	Jude Rhodes	Jr
K	40	Nick Tausch	Sr
LS	60	Jordan Cowart	Sr
LS	61	Scott Daly	Fr

Head coach

- Brian Kelly

Coordinators/assistant coaches

- Bob Diaco – Assistant Head Coach/Defensive Coord./Linebackers
- Paul Longo – Director of Football Strength and Conditioning
- Chuck Martin – Offensive Coordinator/Quarterbacks
- Tony Alford – Running Backs/Slot Wide Receivers/Recruiting Coord.
- Scott Booker – Tight Ends/Special Teams Coordinator
- Kerry Cooks – Co-Defensive Coordinator/Cornerbacks
- Mike Denbrock – Outside Wide Receivers/Passing Game Coordinator
- Bob Elliott – Safeties
- Mike Elston – Defensive Line
- Harry Hiestand – Offensive Line/Running Game Coordinator
- Bill Brechin – Graduate Assistant (Offense)
- Corey Brown – Graduate Assistant (Defense)
- David Grimes – Assistant Strength & Conditioning Coach
- Josh Reardon – Graduate Assistant (Defense)
- Pat Welsh – Graduate Assistant (Offense)
- Tim Collins – Video Coordinator
- Julie DeBuysser – Senior Staff Assistant-Assistant Coaches
- Rob Hunt – Head Football Athletic Trainer
- Ernest Jones – Director of Player Development and Engagement
- Chad Klunder – Director of Football Operations
- Sarah Lawless – Recruiting Services Coordinator
- Tim McDonnell – Director of Football Personnel
- David Peloquin – Director of Football Development
- Beth Rex – Director of Football Administration
- Joy Schosker – Senior Staff Assistant

Legend

- (C) Team captain
- (S) Suspended
- (I) Ineligible
- Injured
- Redshirt

Roster

=== Recruiting class ===
Notre Dame received 17 commitments in the 2012 recruiting class. Those include commitments from three early-enrollees: defensive tackle Sheldon Day, quarterback Gunner Kiel, and cornerback Tee Shepard.

College recruiting (2012)
Name	Hometown	School	Height	Weight	40^{‡}	Commit date
Nick Baratti; ATH/DB	Spring, TX	Klein Oak HS	6 ft 2 in (1.88 m)	215 lb (98 kg)	4.55	Apr 16, 2011
Nick Baratti; ATH/DB	Recruit ratings: Scout: Rivals: (77)					
Chris Brown; WR	Hanahan, SC	Hanahan HS	6 ft 2 in (1.88 m)	185 lb (84 kg)	4.4	Sep 18, 2011
Chris Brown; WR	Recruit ratings: Scout: Rivals: (78)					
Scott Daly; LS	Downers Grove, IL	South HS	6 ft 3 in (1.91 m)	230 lb (100 kg)	–	Apr 16, 2011
Scott Daly; LS	Recruit ratings: Scout: Rivals: (73)					
Sheldon Day; DT	Indianapolis, IN	Warren Central HS	6 ft 2 in (1.88 m)	280 lb (130 kg)	4.4	Aug 3, 2011
Sheldon Day; DT	Recruit ratings: Scout: Rivals: (80)					
Justin Fergurson; WR	Pembroke Pines, FL	Charles W. Flanagan HS	6 ft 2 in (1.88 m)	205 lb (93 kg)	4.5	May 2, 2011
Justin Fergurson; WR	Recruit ratings: Scout: Rivals: (81)					
Mark Harrell; OL	Charlotte, NC	Charlotte Catholic HS	6 ft 5 in (1.96 m)	270 lb (120 kg)	–	May 19, 2011
Mark Harrell; OL	Recruit ratings: Scout: Rivals: (79)					
Jarron Jones; OL/DL	Rochester, NY	Aquinas Institute HS	6 ft 5 in (1.96 m)	290 lb (130 kg)	–	Aug 29, 2011
Jarron Jones; OL/DL	Recruit ratings: Scout: Rivals: (80)					
Gunner Kiel; QB	Columbus, IN	Columbus East HS	6 ft 4 in (1.93 m)	215 lb (98 kg)	–	Jan 17, 2011
Gunner Kiel; QB	Recruit ratings: Scout: Rivals: (82)					
William Mahone; RB	Youngstown, OH	Fitch HS	6 ft 0 in (1.83 m)	205 lb (93 kg)	–	Sep 30, 2011
William Mahone; RB	Recruit ratings: Scout: Rivals: (79)					
Davonte Neal; ATH	Scottsdale, AZ	Chaparral HS	5 ft 9 in (1.75 m)	175 lb (79 kg)	–	Feb 21, 2011
Davonte Neal; ATH	Recruit ratings: Scout: Rivals: (85)					
Romeo Okwara; DE/OLB	Charlotte, NC	Ardrey Kell HS	6 ft 4 in (1.93 m)	235 lb (107 kg)	–	Jul 10, 2011
Romeo Okwara; DE/OLB	Recruit ratings: Scout: Rivals: (77)					
C. J. Prosise; DB	Madison County, VA	Woodberry Forest HS	6 ft 1 in (1.85 m)	190 lb (86 kg)	4.5	May 29, 2011
C. J. Prosise; DB	Recruit ratings: Scout: Rivals: (79)					
KeiVarae Russell; WR/RB	Everett, WA	Mariner HS	5 ft 11 in (1.80 m)	170 lb (77 kg)	–	Dec 29, 2011
KeiVarae Russell; WR/RB	Recruit ratings: Scout: Rivals: (79)					
Tee Shepard; CB	Fresno, CA	Central High East Campus HS	6 ft 0 in (1.83 m)	180 lb (82 kg)	–	Mar 2, 2011
Tee Shepard; CB	Recruit ratings: Scout: Rivals: (80)					
Elijah Shumate; DB	Ramsey, NJ	Don Bosco Prep HS	6 ft 1 in (1.85 m)	205 lb (93 kg)	4.5	Apr 27, 2010
Elijah Shumate; DB	Recruit ratings: Scout: Rivals: (80)					
Ronnie Stanley; OT	Las Vegas, NV	Bishop Gorman HS	6 ft 6 in (1.98 m)	285 lb (129 kg)	–	Dec 15, 2011
Ronnie Stanley; OT	Recruit ratings: Scout: Rivals: (79)					
John Turner; DB	Indianapolis, IN	Cathedral HS	6 ft 1 in (1.85 m)	195 lb (88 kg)	–	Jun 26, 2011
John Turner; DB	Recruit ratings: Scout: Rivals: (76)					
Overall recruit ranking: Scout: 16 Rivals: 20 ESPN: 9
‡ Refers to 40-yard dash; Note: In many cases, Scout, Rivals, 247Sports, On3, and ESPN may conflict in their listings of height, weight and 40 time.; In these cases, the average was taken. ESPN grades are on a 100-point scale.; Sources: "Notre Dame Commit List 2012". Rivals.; "Scout.com Football Recruiting: Notre Dame". Scout.; "2012 Player Commitments – Notre Dame". ESPN.; "Scout.com Team Recruiting Rankings". Scout.; "2012 Team Ranking". Rivals.com.

== Statistics ==
Passing

1. Everett Golson - 187 of 318 (58.8%) for 2,405 yards, 12 touchdowns, 6 interceptions, and a 131.0 passer rating
2. Tommy Rees - 34 of 59 (57.6%) for 436 yards, 2 touchdowns, 2 interceptions, and a 124.1 passer rating.

Rushing

1. Theo Riddick - 917 yards on 190 carries, 4.8-yard average, 5 touchdowns
2. Cierre Wood - 742 yards on 113, 6.5-yard average, 4 touchdowns
3. George Atkinson III - 361 yards on 51 carries, 7.1-yard average, 5 touchdowns
4. Everett Golson - 298 yars on 94 carries, 3.2-yard average, 6 touchdowns
5. Cam Daniels - 125 yards on 23 carries, 5.4-yard average, 1 touchdown

Receiving

1. Tyler Eifert (TE) - 50 reeptions for 685 yards, 13.7-yard average, 4 touchdowns
2. T.J. Jones (WR) - 50 receptions for 649 yards, 13.0-yard average, 4 touchdowns
3. DaVaris Daniels (WR) - 31 receptions for 490 yards, 15.8-yard average, 0 touchdowns
4. Theo Riddick (RB) - 36 receptions for 370 yards, 10.3-yard average, 2 touchdowns
5. Robby Toma (WR) - 24 receptions for 252 yards, 10.5-yard average, 0 touchdowns
6. John Goodman (WR) - 7 receptions for 159 yards, 22.7-yard average, 3 touchdowns

Tackles

1. Manti Te'o (LB) - 113 total tackles, 55 solo tackles, 7 interceptions
2. Zeke Motta (DB) - 77 total tackles, 39 solo tackles
3. Bennett Jackson (DB) - 65 total tackles, 45 solo tackles
4. Dan Fox (LB) - 63 total tackles, 30 solo tackles
5. KeiVarae Russell (DB) - 59 total tackles, 37 solo tackles
6. Prince Shembo (LB) - 51 total tackles, 22 solo tackles, 10.5 tackles for loss, 7.5 sacks
7. Louis Nix III (DL) - 50 total tackles, 20 solo tackles, 7.5 tackles for loss
8. Stephon Tuitt (DL) - 47 total tackles, 24 solo tackles, 13.0 tackles for loss, 12.0 sacks

Scoring

1. Kyle Brindza (K) - 97 points, 28 of 29 PAT, 23 of 31 field goals
2. Theo Riddick (RB) - 42 points, 7 touchdowns
3. Everett Golson (QB) - 38 points, 6 touchdowns, 1 two-point conversion
4. George Atkinson III (RB) - 30 points, 5 touchdowns

== Awards and honors ==
All-Americans

Name	AP	AFCA	FWAA	TSN	WCFF	Athlon	CBS	CFN	ESPN	PFW	Rivals	Scout	SI	Yahoo
Braxston Cave, C	3			3		2	2							
Tyler Eifert, TE	2			2	2		2			1		2	2	
Zack Martin, OL					2									
Zeke Motta, S										Hon. Mention			Hon. Mention	
Louis Nix, NG							3							
Manti Te'o, LB †	1	1	1	1	1	1	1		1	1		1	1	
Stephon Tuitt, DT	2			2	2	2	1		1	Hon. Mention			1	
†denotes unanimous selection. NCAA recognizes a selection to all five of the AP, AFCA, FWAA, SN and WCFF 1st teams for unanimous selections and three of five for consensus selections
