= Tyler Eifert =

American football player (born 1990)

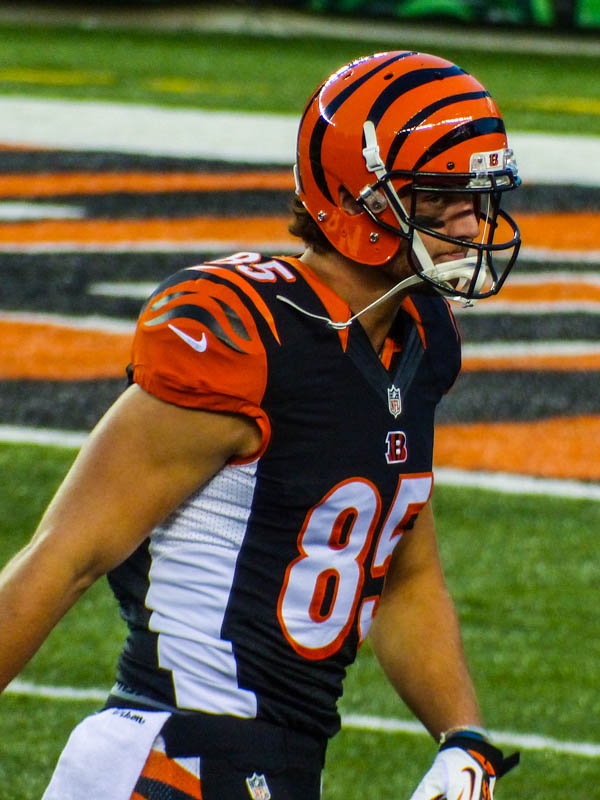
- Eifert with the Cincinnati Bengals in 2013

No. 85, 88
- Position: Tight end

Personal information
- Born: September 8, 1990 (age 36); Fort Wayne, Indiana, U.S.
- Listed height: 6 ft 6 in (1.98 m)
- Listed weight: 255 lb (116 kg)

Career information
- High school: Bishop Dwenger (Fort Wayne)
- College: Notre Dame (2009–2012)
- NFL draft: 2013: 1st round, 21st overall pick

Career history
- Cincinnati Bengals (2013–2019); Jacksonville Jaguars (2020)

Awards and highlights
- Pro Bowl (2015); John Mackey Award (2012); Ozzie Newsome Award (2011); First-team All-American (2011); Second-team All-American (2012)

Career NFL statistics
- Receptions: 221
- Receiving yards: 2,501
- Receiving touchdowns: 26
- Stats at Pro Football Reference

Tyler Gregory Eifert (born September 8, 1990) is an American former professional football player who was a tight end in the National Football League (NFL). He played college football for the Notre Dame Fighting Irish, receiving first-team All-American honors and winning the John Mackey Award as the top college tight end in 2012. Eifert was selected by the Cincinnati Bengals in the first round of the 2013 NFL draft.

== Early life ==
Eifert attended Saint Vincent De Paul Catholic School and Bishop Dwenger High School in Fort Wayne, Indiana. He played tight end and defensive back in football and power forward in basketball. As a senior, he had nine touchdowns on offense and 97 tackles and five interceptions on defense. Considered only a three-star recruit by Rivals.com, he chose to attend Notre Dame over other offers from Indiana, Minnesota, and Purdue.

== College career ==
Eifert enrolled in the University of Notre Dame, where he played for the Notre Dame Fighting Irish football team from 2009 to 2012 under head coaches Charlie Weis and Brian Kelly. As a freshman in 2009, Eifert played in only one game after suffering a back injury. As a sophomore in 2010, he entered the season as a backup to Kyle Rudolph but took over as the starter after Rudolph suffered a season-ending injury. He finished the season with 27 receptions for 352 yards and two touchdowns in 11 games. In his junior season, he took over the tight end starting position. As a starter, Eifert had 63 receptions for 803 yards and five touchdowns. He broke the school's tight end single-season receptions and receiving yards record, previously held by Ken MacAfee. He was named a 2011 Mackey Award finalist but did not win the award. As a senior, he had 50 receptions for 685 yards with 4 touchdowns. He also won the 2012 Mackey Award after being named a finalist the year before and was also named second-team All-American by the Associated Press.

After a 42–14 loss to the Alabama Crimson Tide in the 2013 BCS National Championship Game, Eifert decided to forgo his final season of eligibility and declared his intention to enter the 2013 NFL draft.

== Professional career ==
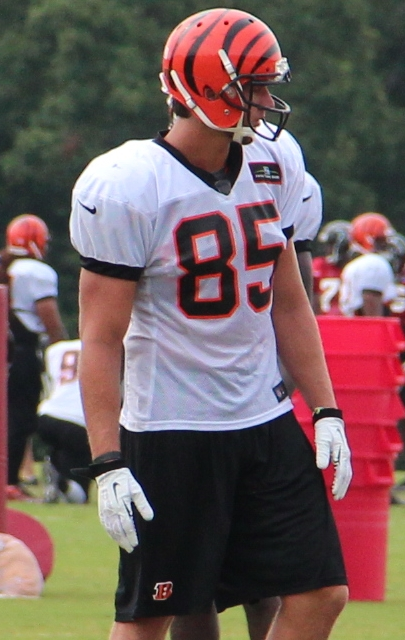
Eifert at Bengals training camp

Pre-draft measurables
Height	Weight	Arm length	Hand span	Wingspan	40-yard dash	10-yard split	20-yard split	20-yard shuttle	Three-cone drill	Vertical jump	Broad jump	Bench press	Wonderlic
6 ft 5 1/2 in (1.97 m)	250 lb (113 kg)	33 1/8 in (0.84 m)	9 1/8 in (0.23 m)	6 ft 6 3/8 in (1.99 m)	4.68 s	1.65 s	2.76 s	4.32 s	6.92 s	35.5 in (0.90 m)	9 ft 11 in (3.02 m)	22 reps	23
All values from NFL Combine

=== Cincinnati Bengals ===
==== 2013 season ====
Eifert was selected in the first round with the 21st overall pick by the Cincinnati Bengals in the 2013 NFL draft. On July 15, 2013, Eifert signed a four-year, $8.25 million rookie contract with the Bengals.

On September 8, 2013, Eifert made his NFL debut, recording five receptions for 47 yards in a 24–21 loss to the Chicago Bears. On September 16, Eifert caught three passes for 66 yards against the Pittsburgh Steelers. On October 20, Eifert caught his first career touchdown on a 32-yard pass from Andy Dalton against the Detroit Lions. On December 15, 2013, Eifert caught his second touchdown of his career against the Pittsburgh Steelers. On December 22, Eifert left the game against the Minnesota Vikings early with a stinger injury. This injury sidelined Eifert for the season finale against the Baltimore Ravens. He finished his rookie season with 39 receptions for 445 receiving yards and two receiving touchdowns.

==== 2014 season ====
On September 7, 2014, during the first game of the 2014 season against the Baltimore Ravens, Eifert recorded three receptions for 37 yards before suffering a dislocated elbow and shoulder labrum tear after landing awkwardly on his arm while trying to twist out of a leg tackle. He was placed on injured reserve on September 10, 2014, and ended up being out for the season.

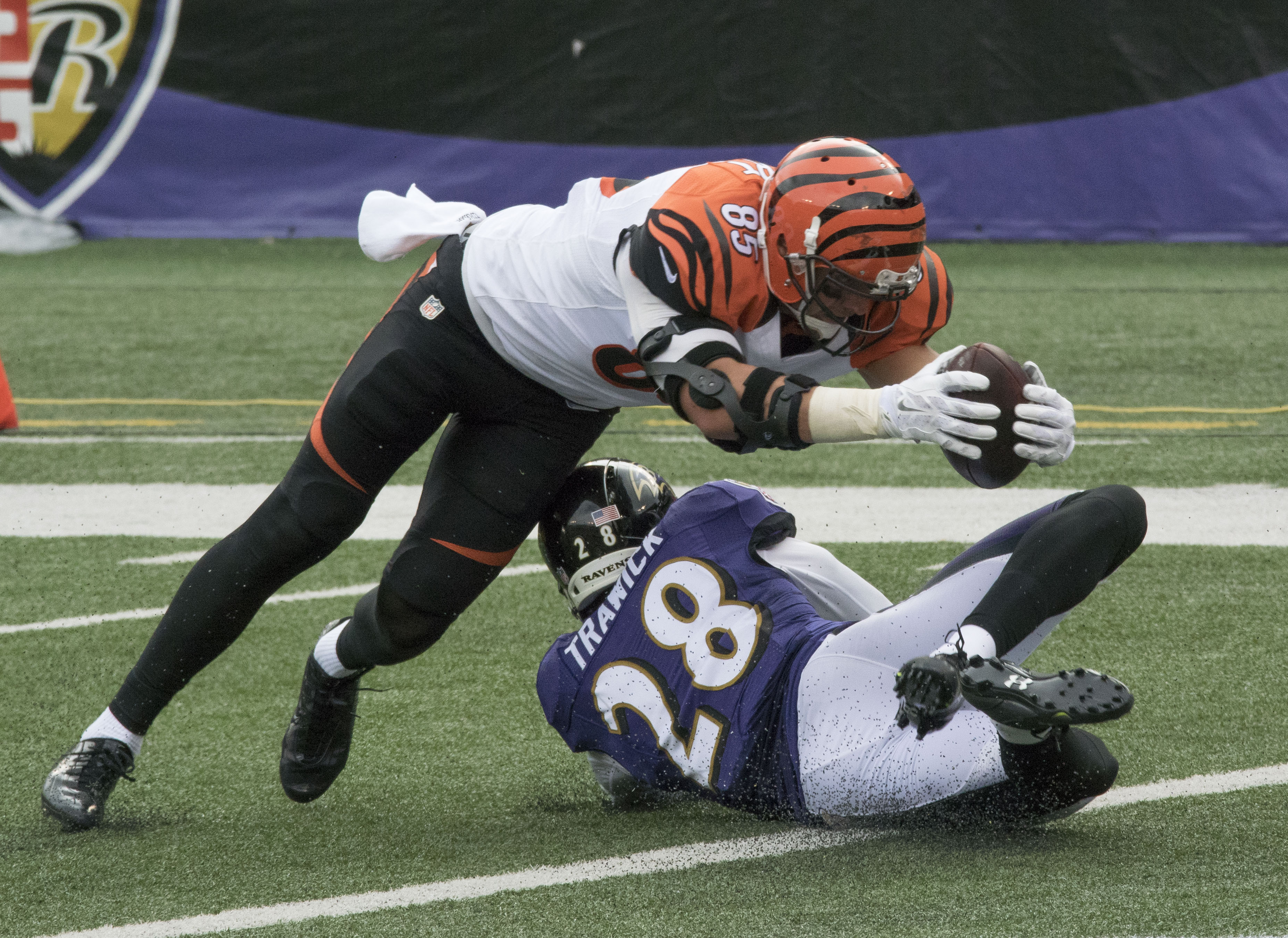
Eifert playing against the Baltimore Ravens in 2015

==== 2015 season ====
On September 13, 2015, Eifert posted a career day with nine receptions for 104 yards and two touchdowns in the season-opening victory over the Oakland Raiders. On October 11, Eifert was Andy Dalton's biggest target in a Week 5, 27–24 comeback victory against the two-time defending NFC Champion Seattle Seahawks with eight receptions for 90 yards and two touchdowns. On November 5, Eifert finished with five catches for 53 yards and three touchdowns in a 31–10 Bengals win over the Cleveland Browns, tying him with Rodney Holman (1989) and Bob Trumpy (1969) for the Bengals franchise record for single-season touchdowns by a tight end, with nine. On November 22, Eifert caught three passes for 22 yards and two touchdowns against the Arizona Cardinals. Eifert became the franchise leader for most single-season touchdowns by a tight end. On November 29, 2015, Eifert caught a touchdown in the Bengals' 31–7 win over the St. Louis Rams. Eifert left the game in the third quarter with a stinger injury. The injury sidelined Eifert for two games until the season finale. On January 3, 2016, Eifert capped off the regular season with a touchdown in the Bengals' 24–16 win over the Baltimore Ravens. He finished the 2015 season with 52 receptions for 615 receiving yards and 13 receiving touchdowns. Eifert earned a bid to the 2016 Pro Bowl on Team Irvin but injured his ankle during the game. He was ranked 44th by his fellow players on the NFL Top 100 Players of 2016.

==== 2016 season ====
On April 13, 2016, the Bengals announced that they would pick up the fifth-year option of Eifert's contract. The injury Eifert suffered in the 2016 Pro Bowl kept Eifert sidelined until Week 8 of the 2016 season. In that game, Eifert caught nine passes for 102 yards and a touchdown against the Washington Redskins, his second 100-plus yard game of his career. Eifert had his first 100-yard game since the 2015 opener and the first time he's teamed with wide receiver A. J. Green for a 100-yarder as well. In Week 10, he caught three passes for 96 yards against the New York Giants. In Week 12, Eifert caught five passes for 68 yards and a touchdown against the Baltimore Ravens. In Week 13, he caught a 13-yard touchdown, his third of the season, against the Philadelphia Eagles. In Week 14, he caught five passes for 48 yards and a season-high two touchdowns against the Cleveland Browns. He was placed on injured reserve on December 26, 2016, after dealing with a lingering back injury. He finished the 2016 season with 29 receptions for 394 receiving yards and five receiving touchdowns.

==== 2017 season ====
Eifert's 2017 season was again cut short due to injuries as he played in two games and had four receptions for 46 receiving yards. On October 11, 2017, the Bengals announced that Eifert would undergo back surgery for the second consecutive season, putting him out for the rest of the year. He also had a cyst surgically removed from his knee.

==== 2018 season ====
On March 15, 2018, Eifert signed a one-year contract to remain with the Bengals.

During a Week 4 matchup against the Atlanta Falcons, Eifert was carted off the field in the third quarter with a right ankle injury. The following day, it was revealed that Eifert suffered a broken ankle and would undergo corrective surgery, missing the remainder of the season. In four games, he totaled 15 receptions for 179 receiving yards and one receiving touchdown.

==== 2019 season ====
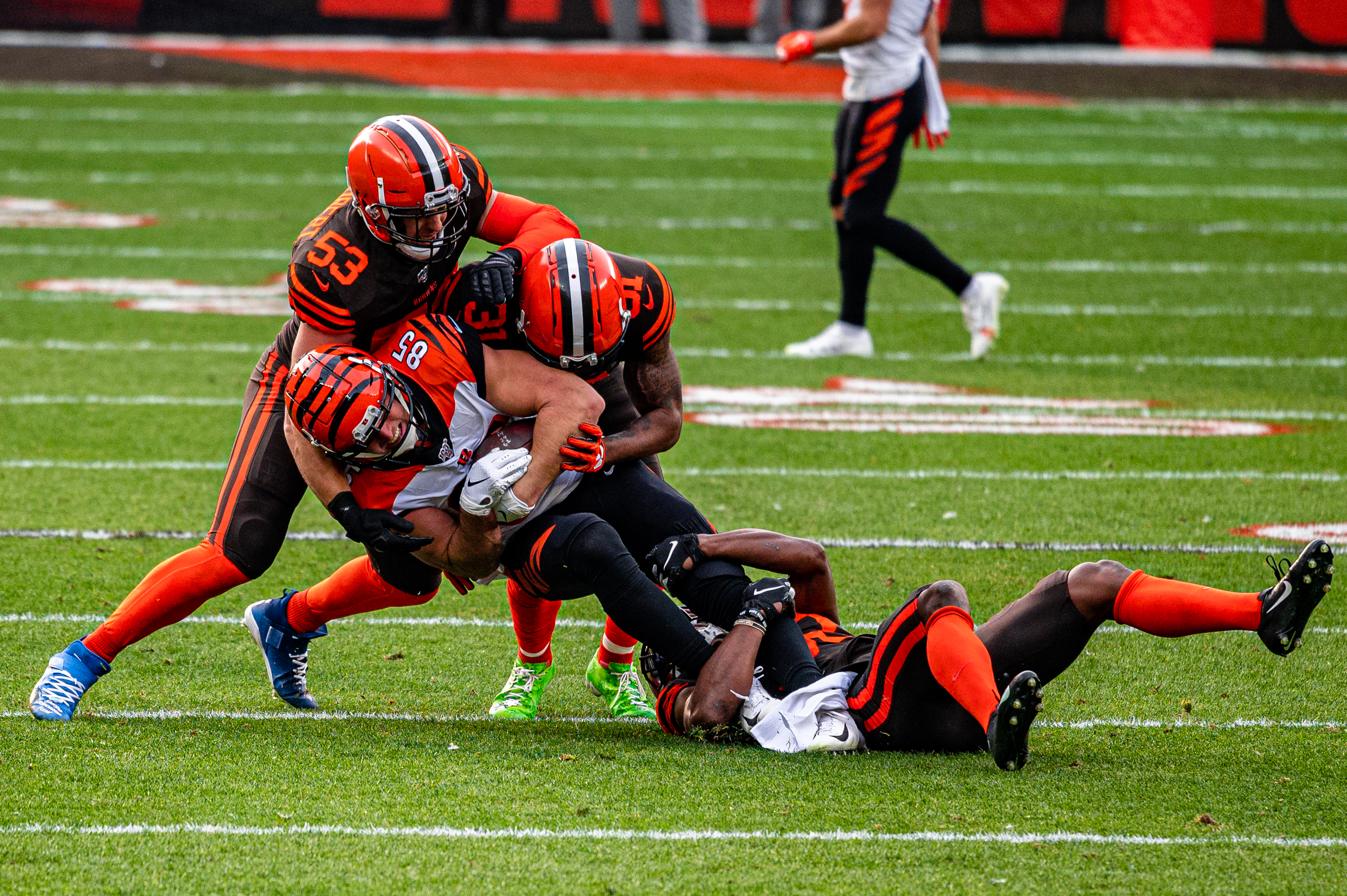
Eifert playing against the Cleveland Browns in 2019.

On March 16, 2019, Eifert signed a one-year contract to remain with the Bengals. He appeared in all 16 games and started four. He totaled 43 receptions for 436 receiving yards and three receiving touchdowns.

=== Jacksonville Jaguars ===
On March 30, 2020, the Jacksonville Jaguars signed Eifert to a two-year contract.

In Week 2 against the Tennessee Titans, Eifert caught three passes for 36 yards and his first touchdown as a Jaguar during the 33–30 loss. He finished the 2020 season with 36 receptions for 349 receiving yards and two receiving touchdowns. In February 2021, the Jaguars declined Eifert's team option.

== Career statistics ==
Legend
**Bold**	Career high

=== NFL ===
Year	Team	Games		Receiving				
Year	Team	GP	GS	Rec	Yds	Avg	Lng	TD
2013	CIN	15	15	39	445	11.4	61	2
2014	CIN	1	1	3	37	12.3	20	0
2015	CIN	13	12	**52**	**615**	11.8	31	**13**
2016	CIN	8	2	29	394	**13.6**	**71**	5
2017	CIN	2	1	4	46	11.5	22	0
2018	CIN	4	2	15	179	11.9	29	1
2019	CIN	16	4	43	436	10.1	27	3
2020	JAX	15	4	36	349	9.7	28	2
Career		74	41	221	2,501	11.3	71	26

=== College ===
Season	Team	GP	Receiving			
Season	Team	GP	Rec	Yds	Avg	TD
2010	Notre Dame	11	27	352	13.0	2
2011	Notre Dame	13	**63**	**803**	12.7	**5**
2012	Notre Dame	13	50	685	**13.7**	4
Career		37	140	1,840	13.1	11

== Personal life ==
Eifert's brother Grady played basketball for Purdue and started on the 2018–19 team. He moved on to become a graduate assistant for the Boilermakers following his collegiate career. Eifert's brother-in-law is former Dallas Cowboys guard Zack Martin, who is married to Eifert's sister, Morgan. Martin and Eifert were teammates and roommates at the University of Notre Dame.
