= DaVaris Daniels =

American gridiron football player (born 1992)

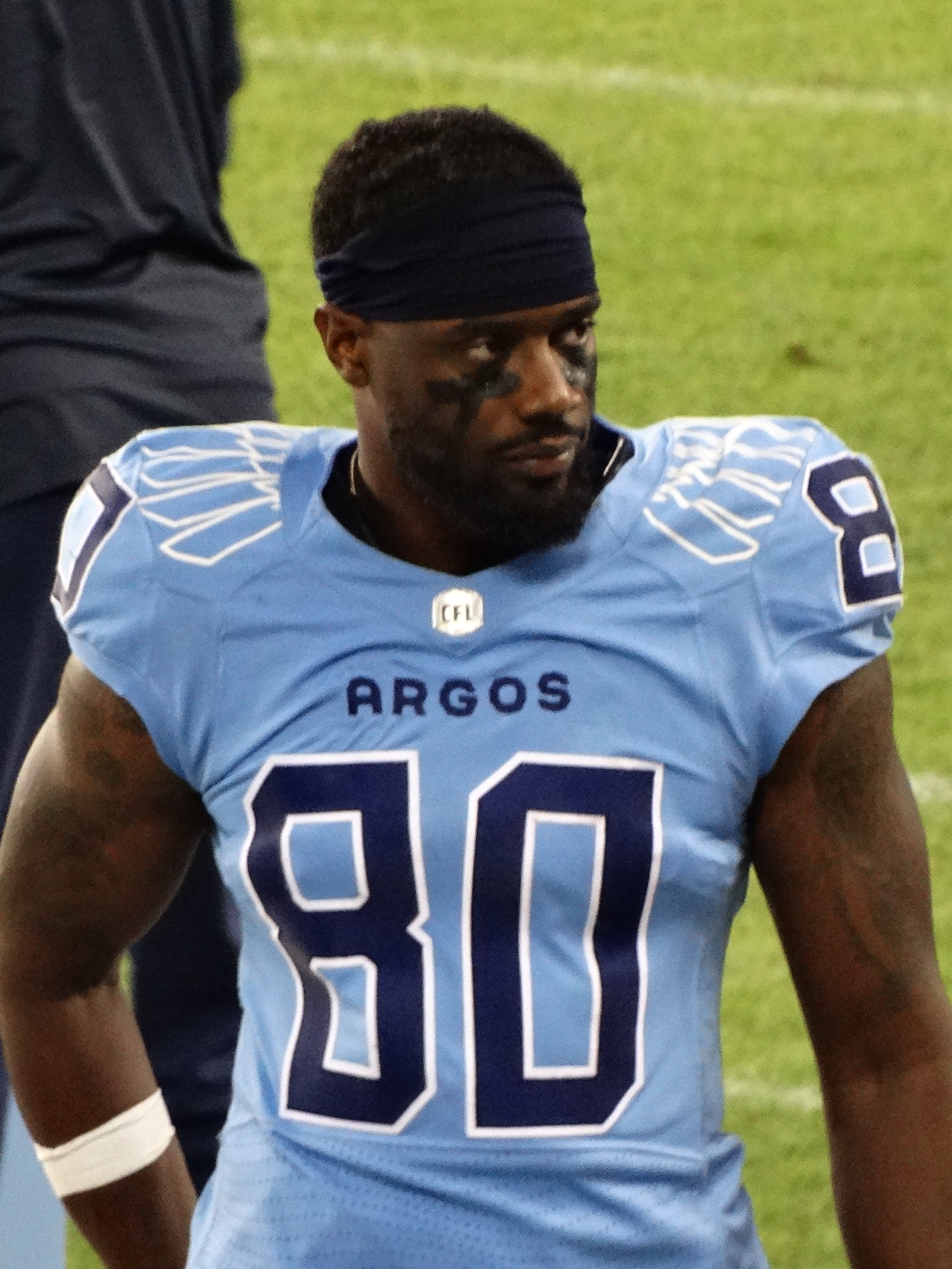
- Daniels with the Toronto Argonauts in 2024

Profile
- Position: Wide receiver

Personal information
- Born: December 18, 1992 (age 33); Vernon Hills, Illinois, U.S.
- Listed height: 6 ft 1 in (1.85 m)
- Listed weight: 203 lb (92 kg)

Career information
- High school: Vernon Hills (IL)
- College: Notre Dame (2011–2014)
- NFL draft: 2015: undrafted

Career history
- Minnesota Vikings (2015)*; New England Patriots (2015)*; Calgary Stampeders (2016–2018); Edmonton Eskimos (2019); Toronto Argonauts (2020–2025)
- * Offseason or practice squad member only

Awards and highlights
- 3× Grey Cup champion (2018, 2022, 2024); CFL's Most Outstanding Rookie Award (2016); Jackie Parker Trophy (2016); CFL East All-Star (2023)

Career CFL statistics as of 2025
- Games played: 125
- Receptions: 444
- Receiving yards: 6,609
- Receiving touchdowns: 43
- Stats at CFL.ca
- Stats at Pro Football Reference

DaVaris Daniels (born December 18, 1992) is an American professional football wide receiver who most recently played for the Toronto Argonauts of the Canadian Football League (CFL). A three-time Grey Cup champion and the CFL’s 2016 Most Outstanding Rookie, Daniels ranks 14th in Argonauts history in receiving touchdowns and 18th in receiving yards.

He won Grey Cups with the Calgary Stampeders in 2018 and the Argonauts in 2022 and 2024, and earned the Jackie Parker Award in 2016. Through 2016-2025, he ranked second among active CFL players in career receiving touchdowns (43) and third in receiving yards (6,609).

Before playing college football at Notre Dame, Daniels was an Under Armour All-American, ranked the No. 1 prospect in Illinois and No. 63 nationally by 247Sports, and the nation’s No. 9 wide receiver by Sporting News.

Daniels began his professional career in the NFL in 2015, signing with the Minnesota Vikings as an undrafted free agent before being claimed off waivers by the New England Patriots.

== Early life ==
A native of Vernon Hills, Illinois, Daniels attended Vernon Hills High School; His first varsity touch for the Vernon Hills Cougars football team came in his freshman season in 2007, and resulted in a 93-yard kickoff return for touchdown. He helped lead Vernon Hills to an 8–3 record as a junior in 2009 as he accounted for 888 all-purpose yards (221 receiving, 344 rushing, 323 passing). As a senior, he led his team to the Illinois Class 5A quarterfinals in the 2010 state playoffs. He accounted for 19 total touchdowns during his senior season: 10 rushing TDs, five receiving TDs, two punt returns, one interception return and one blocked field goal return. He was a Chicago Tribune first-team all-state selection and was selected to play in the 2011 Under Armour All-America Game in St. Petersburg, Florida. Also a member of Vernon Hills basketball teams, Daniels was the state record holder in the Illinois middle school high jump. Daniels was not a member of the track and field team at Vernon Hills High School.

Considered a four-star recruit by Rivals.com, Daniels was rated as the 21st best wide receiver prospect of his class, and the second best prospect from the state of Illinois. He was named best prospect in Illinois and 63rd-best player in the nation by 247Sports.com. He was rated as the ninth-best wide receiver and the 64th-ranked player in the country by Sporting News. He was also ranked 65th on the ESPN.com Top 150 list. On September 29, 2010, he announced his commitment to the University of Notre Dame.

== College career ==
Daniels redshirted his first year at Notre Dame. As a sophomore in 2012, Daniels played in 11 games catching 31 passes for 490 yards (15.8 YPC). In the 2013 BCS National Championship Game vs. Alabama, he recorded a career-high 115 receiving yards on six receptions. In 2013, as a full-time starter for the Irish, Daniels recorded 49 catches for 745 yards and seven touchdowns. Against Purdue, Daniels caught an 82-yard pass from Tommy Rees where he fought off cornerback Ricardo Allen down the sideline for 40 yards before scoring he had the best catch of the year he was an outstanding player.

=== Academic issues ===
On January 9, 2014, Daniels was suspended for the spring semester for an academic issue, and was not permitted to practice with the team. Daniels was deemed academically ineligible by the university, and was already on academic probation after failing to keep a 2.0 GPA in the fall semester. On May 28, 2014, he was re-instated by the university.

On August 15, 2014, the university announced that they were investigating suspected academic dishonesty on the part of several students, including members of the football team, Daniels along with KeiVarae Russell, Kendall Moore and Ishaq Williams were those named in the investigation, with another player, Eilar Hardy, named a few weeks later. Daniels maintained that he was innocent and that he "wrote his own papers". On October 14, 2014, nearly two months since the school announced the investigation, DaVaris' father took to Twitter to announce that his son was "done" at Notre Dame and would be moving onto other options.

Daniels announced his intentions to forgo his remaining eligibility and enter the 2015 NFL draft.

== Professional career ==
=== Pre-draft ===
Pre-draft measurables
Height	Weight	Arm length	Hand span	40-yard dash	10-yard split	20-yard split	20-yard shuttle	Three-cone drill	Vertical jump	Broad jump	Bench press
6 ft 1 1/2 in (1.87 m)	201 lb (91 kg)	31 1/4 in (0.79 m)	9 in (0.23 m)	4.53 s	1.54 s	2.56 s	4.35 s	6.81 s	39.5 in (1.00 m)	11 ft 1 in (3.38 m)	13 reps
All values from NFL Combine and Pro Day

At his Pro Day, Daniels put up a 39.5-inch vertical jump, improving on his combine number by 2.5 inches. He also improved his 40-yard dash time from 4.62 at the combine to 4.53 seconds, and his broad jump from 10 feet 2 inches (3.10 m) to 11 ft 1 in (3.38 m).

=== Minnesota Vikings ===
Daniels signed a free agent contract with the Minnesota Vikings following going undrafted in the 2015 NFL draft worth $1,585,000. He received a $10,000 signing bonus.

=== New England Patriots ===
The New England Patriots claimed Daniels off waivers on September 1, 2015. Daniels was waived by the Patriots only 3 days later.

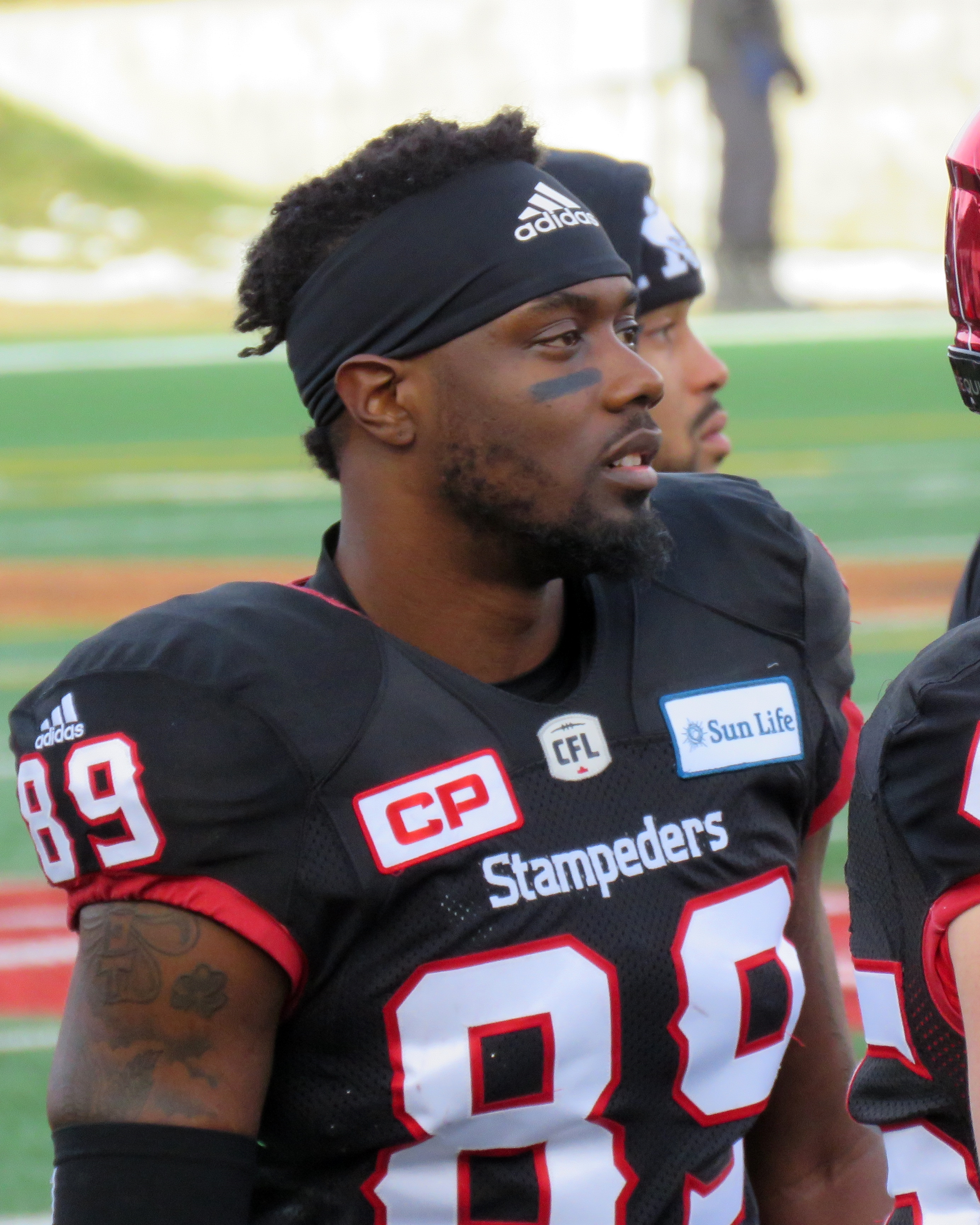
Daniels with the Calgary Stampeders in 2017.

=== Calgary Stampeders ===
Daniels signed with the Calgary Stampeders of the Canadian Football League (CFL) in time for their 2016 season. Daniels played in 11 games for the Stampeders in his rookie season, catching 51 passes for 885 yards with 9 touchdowns. His contributions on the field were noticed by his teammates and around the league and he received the award for the CFL's Most Outstanding Rookie Award. Daniels had reasonably good second season in the CFL, playing in 13 games catching 47 passes for 743 yards with 4 touchdowns. In the 105th Grey Cup game Daniels caught 11 passes for 113 yards. Daniels was re-signed by the Stamps on the eve of free agency. Daniels played in the first 12 games of the 2018 season for the Stampeders, catching 50 passes for 747 yards with 7 touchdowns. Following the teams Week 14 victory over the Tiger-Cats Head Coach Dave Dickenson revealed that Daniels had suffered a broken collarbone.

=== Edmonton Eskimos ===
On February 12, 2019, the first day of free agency, Daniels signed with the Edmonton Eskimos. He played and started in 13 regular season games where he recorded 54 receptions for 738 yards and two touchdowns.

=== Toronto Argonauts ===
On February 11, 2020, Daniels signed with the Toronto Argonauts. However, he did not play in 2020 due to the cancellation of the 2020 CFL season and he re-structured his contract with the Argonauts on January 31, 2021. In 2021, he played in 13 regular season games where he had 51 catches for 597 yards and four touchdowns.

On July 16, 2022, in Touchdown Atlantic, Daniels scored the first touchdown in the first CFL regular season game played in Nova Scotia after catching a seven-yard pass from McLeod Bethel-Thompson. He played in 16 regular season games in 2022, starting in 15, where he had 61 catches for 860 yards and four touchdowns. He also played in both post-season games, including the 109th Grey Cup, where he had seven receptions for 58 yards in the victory over the Winnipeg Blue Bombers.

In 2023, Daniels played and started in 17 regular season games where he recorded 52 catches for 1,009 yards and eight touchdowns. This marked the first 1000-yard season in his career. Daniels was then named a CFL Division All-Star for the first time. He also played in the East Final loss to the Montreal Alouettes where he had four catches for 77 yards and one touchdown.

In the 2024 season, Daniels played and started in 16 regular season games where he had 48 receptions for 622 yards and two touchdowns. He also played in all three post-season games, including the 111th Grey Cup where he had three receptions for 37 yards in the Argonauts' 41–24 victory over the Winnipeg Blue Bombers.

Daniels played in 10 games in 2025 where he had 30 catches for 408 yards and three touchdowns. He became a free agent upon the expiry of his contract on February 10, 2026.

== Personal life ==
His father, Phillip Daniels, played defensive end for 15 seasons in the NFL for the Seattle Seahawks, Chicago Bears, and Washington Redskins.
