= Darius Fleming =

American football player (born 1989)

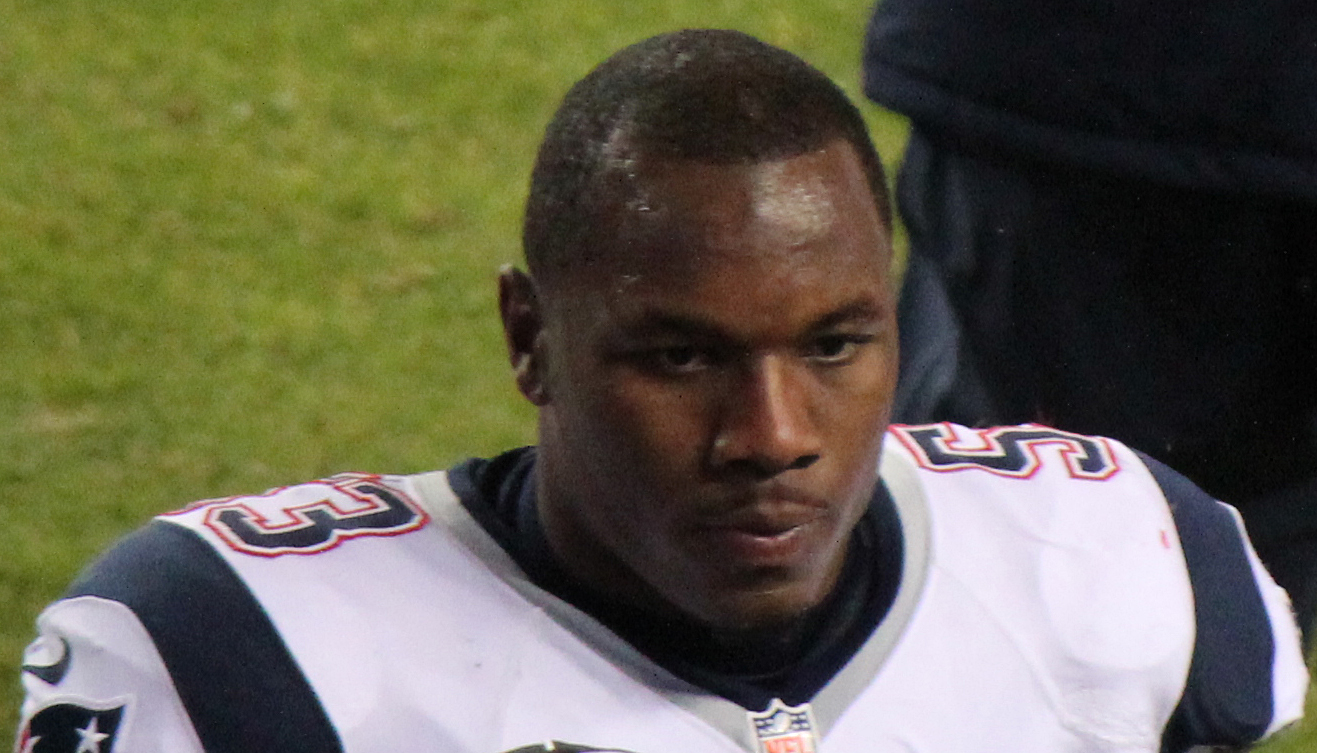
- Fleming with the New England Patriots in 2015

No. 58, 53
- Position: Linebacker

Personal information
- Born: July 19, 1989 (age 37); Chicago, Illinois, U.S.
- Listed height: 6 ft 2 in (1.88 m)
- Listed weight: 245 lb (111 kg)

Career information
- High school: St. Rita (Chicago)
- College: Notre Dame
- NFL draft: 2012: 5th round, 165th overall pick

Career history
- San Francisco 49ers (2012−2013); New England Patriots (2014–2015)

Awards and highlights
- Super Bowl champion (XLIX)

Career NFL statistics
- Total tackles: 10
- Stats at Pro Football Reference

Darius Fleming (born July 19, 1989) is an American former professional football player who was a linebacker in the National Football League (NFL). He played college football for the Notre Dame Fighting Irish and was selected by the San Francisco 49ers in the fifth round of the 2012 NFL draft.

== Early life ==
Fleming attended St. Rita High School in Chicago, Illinois. As a junior, he recorded 105 tackles including 15 tackles for loss and nine sacks, and helped lead St. Rita to the Class 7A state championship. As a senior, he led his high school to the Chicago Prep Bowl city championship. He recorded 69 tackles including 15 tackles for loss and ten sacks. For his efforts, he was chosen to play in the U.S. Army All-American Bowl in San Antonio, Texas.

Considered to be a four-star recruit by Rivals.com, he was rated as the No.8 outside linebacker in the nation. He committed to Notre Dame over offers from Iowa, Michigan, and hometown Illinois.

Fleming also competed in rodeos and bowling, and was a good enough bowler that he considered transferring to a school with a better bowling team.

== College career ==
He mainly played 4–3 defensive end and 3–4 outside linebacker during his tenure for the Irish. Over his four-year career, he accumulated 157 tackles, including 32 for loss, fourteen and a half sacks, two interceptions, and nine pass deflections.

== Professional career ==
=== San Francisco 49ers ===
Fleming was selected by the 49ers in the fifth round (165th overall) of the 2012 NFL draft. He tore his ACL on May 11, 2012, at the 49ers rookie minicamp, and was eliminated for his entire rookie season. On July 30, 2013, he retore the same ACL during training camp, and was waived/injured by the team. On July 31, 2013, Fleming cleared waivers and was placed on the injured reserve list. Fleming was released on May 12, 2014

=== New England Patriots ===
Fleming was signed by the New England Patriots on May 16, 2014. He was released on September 13, 2014, and signed to the team's practice squad on September 16, 2014. On November 29, he was promoted to the active roster. Fleming played primarily on special teams during the Patriots' playoff run and Super Bowl XLIX championship, and recovered a Josh Cribbs muffed punt in the AFC Championship Game.

On September 5, 2015, he was released from the Patriots during the team's 53-man roster cuts, and was re-signed to New England's practice squad two days later. Fleming was promoted to the active roster on November 28, 2015.

On January 14, 2016, Fleming rescued a woman from a three-car accident in which a big rig made an immediate turn and caused cars to pile up behind it. Darius pulled over and noticed that the cars were smoking, and he subsequently broke into the front passenger seat of one of the cars and saved a woman's life. He played in the Patriots' 2015–16 NFL playoffs Divisional Playoff Game versus the Kansas City Chiefs on January 16, just two days after the rescue with 22 stitches in his leg. It wasn't until about a week later that news about the wreck was made public.

On March 4, 2016, the Patriots released Fleming.
