= Evan Landi =

American football player (born 1990)

No. --5 – New Yorker Lions
- Position: Tight end

Personal information
- Born: April 15, 1990 (age 36); Coral Springs, Florida
- Listed height: 6 ft 3 in (1.91 m)
- Listed weight: 236 lb (107 kg)

Career information
- High school: Coral Springs Charter
- College: South Florida
- NFL draft: 2013: undrafted

Career history
- Tampa Bay Buccaneers (2013)*; New England Patriots (2013)*
- * Offseason or practice squad member only

Evan Landi (born April 15, 1990) is an American football tight end who is currently a free agent. Landi played college football at South Florida.

== College career ==
Landi played college football at South Florida.

== Professional career ==
=== Tampa Bay Buccaneers ===
On April 29, 2013, Landi was signed as an undrafted free agent by the Tampa Bay Buccaneers. On June 4, 2013, Landi was waived by the team.

=== New England Patriots ===
On August 13, 2013, Landi was signed by the New England Patriots. On August 27, 2013, Landi was released by the Patriots.

=== New Yorker Lions ===
Landi is currently playing for the New Yorker Lions, an American football team based in Germany. He won the Euro Bowl 2015.
