= Braxston Cave =

American football player (born 1989)

No. 52
- Position: Center

Personal information
- Born: July 29, 1989 (age 37); Granger, Indiana, U.S.
- Listed height: 6 ft 3 in (1.91 m)
- Listed weight: 303 lb (137 kg)

Career information
- High school: Penn (Mishawaka, Indiana)
- College: Notre Dame (2008–2012)
- NFL draft: 2013: undrafted

Career history
- Cleveland Browns (2013)*; New England Patriots (2013–2014)*; Washington Redskins (2014)*; Cleveland Browns (2014)*; Detroit Lions (2015)
- * Offseason or practice squad member only

Awards and highlights
- Third-team All-American (2012)
- Stats at Pro Football Reference

Braxston Cave (born July 29, 1989) is an American former professional football player who was a center in the National Football League (NFL). He played college football for the Notre Dame Fighting Irish. He went undrafted in the 2013 NFL draft.

== Early life ==
Cave played for Penn High School in Mishawaka, Indiana. Cave was one of 12 finalists for Indiana's "Mr. Football" award, he was named to the Indiana top-50 all-state team by the Indiana Football Coaches Association, he was runner-up for the Offensive Lineman of the Year Award sponsored by the Indianapolis Star, and he made the Scout.com All-America second-team. Cave was selected to play in the first Under Armour All-America Game in Orlando, Florida.

== College career ==
Cave played college football for the Notre Dame Fighting Irish in nearby South Bend, Indiana. He was a starter beginning in 2010, his junior year. He was injured in 2011, missing the rest of the year, and played as a fifth-year senior in 2012. He was named a third-team Associated Press All-American.

== Professional career ==
Cave went undrafted in the 2013 NFL draft. He was signed by the Cleveland Browns for the preseason but did not make the team. In 2014, he was a preseason signing of the New England Patriots, but again was cut.

In September 2015, Cave was cut by the Detroit Lions during the final round of roster cuts, but was later signed to the team's practice squad. He was signed to the active roster off the practice squad on December 30, 2015, before the Lions' final game of the 2015 season.
