= Mike Mayock =

American football player and executive (born 1958)

No. 39
- Position: Safety

Personal information
- Born: August 14, 1958 (age 68); Philadelphia, Pennsylvania, U.S.
- Listed height: 6 ft 2 in (1.88 m)
- Listed weight: 195 lb (88 kg)

Career information
- High school: The Haverford School (Haverford, Pennsylvania)
- College: Boston College
- NFL draft: 1981: 10th round, 265th overall pick

Career history

Playing
- Pittsburgh Steelers (1981)*; Toronto Argonauts (1981); New York Giants (1982–1983)
- * Offseason or practice squad member only

Operations
- Oakland / Las Vegas Raiders (2019–2021) General manager

Awards and highlights
- First-team All-East (1980)

Career NFL statistics
- Games played: 9
- Return yards: 9
- Kick returns: 1
- Stats at Pro Football Reference
- Executive profile at Pro Football Reference

Michael Francis Mayock Sr. (born August 14, 1958) is an American former professional football executive and player in the National Football League (NFL). He played as a safety with the New York Giants. After his playing career, he was a draft analyst for the NFL Network, and a game analyst for NBC's coverage of Notre Dame football. He served as the general manager of the Las Vegas Raiders from 2019 to 2021.

== Playing career ==
Mayock played high school football at The Haverford School in Haverford, Pennsylvania, and college football (and baseball) at Boston College. He was selected as a safety by the Pittsburgh Steelers in the tenth round of the 1981 NFL draft, as the 265th overall pick. He was waived during first roster cuts on August 18, 1981. After his release, he signed with the CFL's Toronto Argonauts during the 1981 season. He played in just one game before being released. He returned to the NFL with the New York Giants for the 1982 and 1983 football seasons.

In 1982, he played in the first two games of the season before the players' strike caused the cancellation of the next eight games. When the players returned on November 21, Mayock tore his rotator cuff in a game against the Washington Redskins, and was placed on injured reserve on November 24, 1982.

Mayock was placed on injured reserve again before the start of the 1983 season on August 30, after undergoing arthroscopic knee surgery. He was activated from the list on October 16, 1983. He played in one game before he was placed on injured reserve again on October 24, 1983. He was activated from the injured reserve list after clearing procedural waivers on November 19, 1983. He played in the remaining five games of the season thereafter. He was waived by the Giants on July 27, 1984.

== Broadcasting career ==
After an 18-year career in commercial real estate, Mayock broke into broadcasting covering college football for Prime Network, NCAA Productions, Prime Sports Radio and the Big East Conference. Later he went to ESPN where he worked as an analyst and sideline reporter for the cable network's coverage of the Canadian Football League and college football from 1993 to 1995. He moved from ESPN to CBS Sports in 1996 as a member of SEC on CBS' broadcast team—during which time he served as both a game analyst (1996, 1997 and 1999) and lead sideline reporter (1998). Mayock also worked as a reporter for CBS's coverage of the NCAA basketball tournament in 1997, 1998 and 1999.

In 2000, he moved to Fox Sports Net where he called college football action. Between 2001 and 2004, Mayock served as a college football analyst for ABC Sports. For example, in 2002, he worked with Terry Gannon, then he worked with Derrin Horton, and, finally, he worked with Dr. Jerry Punch as the sixth-announcing team. From 2004 to 2018, Mayock worked with the NFL Network where he did his most notable work while a broadcaster.

He was the color commentator for the Minnesota Vikings preseason games for several seasons. From 2015 to 2018, Mayock commentated on the Philadelphia Eagles preseason television broadcasts alongside play-by-play announcer Scott Graham and sideline reporter Dave Spadero.

Mayock was an analyst for NFL Network and hosted the show Path To The Draft during the draft season as a draft guru.

In 2010, Mayock replaced Pat Haden as the color commentator for NBC's coverage of Notre Dame football, teaming with play-by-play announcer Tom Hammond. On January 8, 2011, Mayock teamed with Hammond to call NBC's coverage of the Wild Card playoff game between the New Orleans Saints and Seattle Seahawks in what was later referred to as the Beast Quake game. This was his first NFL Playoffs game as a broadcaster.

On January 5, 2012, Mayock commentated the AFC wild card game between the Cincinnati Bengals and Houston Texans.

Mayock called Thursday Night Football on the NFL Network with Brad Nessler from 2011 through 2013. In February 2014, the NFL announced that CBS Sports and the NFL Network would share and co-produce the Thursday Night package, using the No. 1 CBS announce team of Jim Nantz and Phil Simms for the entire season, replacing Nessler and Mayock.

Mayock was replaced by Doug Flutie as color commentator of Notre Dame football, beginning with the 2015 season. Currently Mike Mayock works as an analyst for select games on Westwood One. Mayock also works as a Football Evaluation Specialist for SūmerSports, and is a featured scout in SūmerSports’ NFL draft evaluation show, THE EVALUATION.

== Executive career ==
=== Oakland / Las Vegas Raiders ===
On December 31, 2018, Mayock was hired to be the general manager of the Oakland Raiders. One of Mayock's first breakthroughs as general manager was trading for Pittsburgh Steelers wide receiver Antonio Brown. In his first draft with the team, Mayock used the team's three first-round picks on Clelin Ferrell, Josh Jacobs, and Johnathan Abram. Mayock was involved in a heated verbal exchange with Brown during a practice session prior to the start of the 2019 NFL season, in which Brown insulted Mayock as a "cracker". The altercation allegedly stemmed from an Instagram post in which Brown displayed a letter from Mayock that detailed approximately $54,000 in fines for absences during training camp, which led to Brown being released and later signing with the New England Patriots.

On January 17, 2022, the Raiders released Mayock after the team's first playoff game since 2017. The Raiders' overall record with Mayock was 25–24 in the regular season and 0–1 in the playoffs. Some of the Raiders' best picks during Mayock's tenure came after Round 1 including Trayvon Mullen (who was traded for a 7th round pick in 2022), Maxx Crosby, and Hunter Renfrow in 2019—and Divine Deablo and Nate Hobbs in 2021. None of Mayock's first round picks in the 2020 and 2021 NFL drafts (Henry Ruggs, Damon Arnette, and Alex Leatherwood) lasted a little more than a year with the team and did not play a single game since January 2023. Mayock has claimed he was fired, in part, for his belief that Rich Bisaccia should have been retained as head coach.

== Personal life ==
Mayock has two children, Leigh and Mike Jr., the latter of whom played football at Villanova. He also has two stepchildren. He resides in the Philadelphia area with his wife Amanda and their rescue dog Willow.
