= Chris Salvi =

American football player and coach (born 1989)

Profile
- Position: Safety

Personal information
- Born: June 22, 1989 (age 37); Lake Forest, Illinois, U.S.
- Listed height: 5 ft 10 in (1.78 m)
- Listed weight: 190 lb (86 kg)

Career information
- High school: Carmel Catholic (Mundelein, Illinois)
- College: Butler (2008); Notre Dame (2009–2012)
- NFL draft: 2013: undrafted

Career history

Playing
- Torino Giaguari (2014, 2016)

Coaching
- St. Ignatius College Prep (2013–2014) (Asst); Chicago Maroons (2015) (Asst); Connecticut Huskies (2016) (Asst)

Chris Salvi (born June 22, 1989) is an American former football safety. He played college football at Butler and Notre Dame, and professionally in the Italian Football League (IFL).

== Early life ==
Salvi grew up in Lake Forest, Illinois, and is one of five boys in the family. He attended Carmel Catholic High School in Mundelein, Illinois, where he was a two-year starter and two-year letterman. He started at cornerback his junior year and at safety his senior year. The team advanced to the Illinois 7A state semifinals and finished with a 10–3 record his senior year in 2007 as Salvi recorded 107 tackles, 4 interceptions, 3 fumbles recovered, 1 sack and 1 touchdown on a blocked punt. He was named to both the Lake County All-Area team and the All-East Suburban Catholic Conference team as a senior. He was also a team captain at Carmel Catholic.

He graduated from Carmel Catholic in 2008. He did not receive any FBS scholarship offers out of high school.

== College career ==
Salvi played in 11 games for the Butler Bulldogs of Butler University in 2008 and accumulated four tackles. He played safety at Butler.

He then transferred to the University of Notre Dame, where he was a member of the Notre Dame Fighting Irish football team from 2009 to 2012. Salvi joined Notre Dame as a walk-on but earned a scholarship his final season in 2012. He was a safety at Notre Dame and primarily played special teams.

He had to sit out the 2009 season due to NCAA transfer rules. He appeared in nine games in 2010 and recorded two total tackles. He played in 13 games in 2011 and made 10 total tackles. During the 2011 Michigan State game, he made a block that took out two opposing players and helped teammate George Atkinson return a kickoff for a touchdown. He was named a co-captain for the game against Navy on October 29, 2011. Salvi played in 13 games during the 2012 season and recorded six total tackles, including an assisted tackle in the 2013 BCS National Championship Game on January 7, 2013. On November 13, 2012, he was named one of 50 nominees for the Burlsworth Trophy, which is given to the "most outstanding football player in America who began his career as a walk-on." His brother, Will, was also on the Irish football team in 2012. They were one of four sets of brothers on the team that year. Salvi participated in the annual Notre Dame Bengal Bouts charity tournament in 2012 and won the 188-pound division.

Salvi played in 35 career games for the Irish and recorded 18 total tackles. He graduated from Notre Dame with a bachelor's degree in political science.

== Professional career ==
Pre-draft measurables
Height	Weight	40-yard dash	10-yard split	20-yard split	20-yard shuttle	Three-cone drill	Vertical jump	Broad jump	Bench press
5 ft 10 in (1.78 m)	185 lb (84 kg)	4.73 s	1.68 s	2.65 s	4.25 s	6.92 s	30 in (0.76 m)	8 ft 7 in (2.62 m)	17 reps
All values from Notre Dame Pro Day

After going undrafted in the 2013 NFL draft, Salvi attended rookie minicamp with the Chicago Bears in May 2013 but was not signed. He played for the Torino Giaguari of the Italian Football League first division in 2014. He did not play in 2015 as he had accepted a job offer. However, he later left the job and became an assistant coach at the University of Chicago. He returned to play for the Giaguari in 2016. He played safety during his time with the Giaguari.

== Coaching career ==
Salvi was specials teams coordinator and defensive backs coach at St. Ignatius College Prep in Chicago, Illinois in 2013. He was defensive coordinator and defensive backs coach at St. Ignatius in 2014. He was an offensive and special teams assistant for the Chicago Maroons of the University of Chicago in 2015. He became a defensive graduate assistant for the Connecticut Huskies of the University of Connecticut in 2016.

== Personal life ==
Salvi's father, Patrick, is a lawyer. His uncle, Al, is an attorney. His brother, Will, was also on the Irish football team in 2012. Salvi grew up a Notre Dame fan.
