= Ishaq Williams =

American football player (born 1993)

No. 97
- Position: Defensive end

Personal information
- Born: February 22, 1993 (age 33); Brooklyn, New York
- Listed height: 6 ft 4 in (1.93 m)
- Listed weight: 253 lb (115 kg)

Career information
- High school: Brooklyn (NY) Lincoln
- College: Notre Dame (2011–2013)
- NFL draft: 2016: undrafted

Career history
- New York Giants (2016–2017)
- Stats at Pro Football Reference

Ishaq Williams (born February 22, 1993) is an American former football defensive end. He played college football at the University of Notre Dame.

== College career ==
As a freshman, Williams played 11 games and recorded 6 tackles. The following season, he recorded 22 tackles (3.5 for a loss) in 13 games, and forced a fumble which was returned for a 77-yard touchdown. The next season was largely void of notable achievements, with the exception of making his first career start against Air Force on October 26. He was not enrolled in college during his senior year of 2014, and while Williams was enrolled in 2015, he was not eligible to play in NCAA games.

== Professional career ==
Williams was signed by the New York Giants as an undrafted free agent on May 9, 2016. He was waived by the Giants on September 3, 2016 during final roster cuts and was signed to the practice squad the next day. He was promoted to the active roster on December 20, 2016.

Williams was waived/injured by the Giants on May 25, 2017 and was placed on injured reserve.

On February 15, 2018, Williams was waived by the Giants with a failed physical.
