= 2013 Notre Dame Fighting Irish football team =

American college football season

2013 Notre Dame Fighting Irish football

Pinstripe Bowl, W 29–16 (vacated) vs. Rutgers
- Conference: Independent

Ranking
- Coaches: No. 24
- AP: No. 20
- Record: 0–4, 9 wins vacated
- Head coach: Brian Kelly (4th season)
- Offensive coordinator: Chuck Martin (2nd season)
- Offensive scheme: Spread
- Defensive coordinator: Bob Diaco (4th season)
- Co-defensive coordinator: Kerry Cooks (4th season)
- Base defense: 3–4
- MVP: T. J. Jones
- Captains: Zack Martin; Bennett Jackson; T. J. Jones
- Home stadium: Notre Dame Stadium

2013 NCAA Division I FBS independents football records
	Conf.			Overall
Team	W		L	W		L
No. 20 Notre Dame*		–		9	–	4
Navy		–		9	–	4
BYU		–		8	–	5
Army		–		3	–	9
New Mexico State		–		2	–	10
Idaho		–		1	–	11
*All wins for Notre Dame (9–4) in the 2013 season were later vacated; Rankings from AP Poll

The 2013 Notre Dame Fighting Irish football team was an American football team that represented the University of Notre Dame as an independent during the 2013 NCAA Division I FBS football season. In their fourth year under head coach Brian Kelly, the Irish compiled a 9–4 record, outscored opponents by a total of 354 to 291, and were ranked No. 20 in the AP poll and No. 24 in the Coaches Poll. They lost to No. 17 Michigan, No. 14 Oklahoma, unranked Pittsburgh, and No. 8 Stanford, and finished the season with a victory over unranked Rutgers in the Pinstripe Bowl.

The team's statistical leaders included quarterback Tommy Rees (3,257 passing yards), running back Cam McDaniel (705 rushing yards), wide receiver T.J. Jones (70 receptions for 1,108 yards), linebacker Dan Fox (95 total tackles), and kicker Kyle Brindza (98 points scored, 38 of 38 PAT, 20 of 26 field goals).

In November 2016, the NCAA infractions panel vacated all wins from Notre Dame's 2012 and 2013 seasons based on its finding that ineligible students had played for the 2012 and 2013 teams. A student athletic trainer committed academic misconduct, including completing coursework, for two players and provided impermissible academic extra benefits to six other players. Another player was found to have committed academic misconduct on his own in a total of eight courses. The penalties were upheld after an appeal by Notre Dame.

The team played its home games at Notre Dame Stadium in Notre Dame, Indiana.

== Schedule ==
Date	Time	Opponent	Rank	Site	TV	Result	Attendance
August 31	3:30 p.m.	Temple	No. 14	Notre Dame Stadium; Notre Dame, IN	NBC	W 28–6 (vacated)	80,795
September 7	8:00 p.m.	at No. 17 Michigan	No. 14	Michigan Stadium; Ann Arbor, MI (rivalry)	ESPN	L 30–41	115,109^{‡}
September 14	8:00 p.m.	at Purdue	No. 21	Ross–Ade Stadium; West Lafayette, IN (rivalry)	ABC	W 31–24 (vacated)	61,127
September 21	3:30 p.m.	Michigan State	No. 22	Notre Dame Stadium; Notre Dame, IN (rivalry)	NBC	W 17–13 (vacated)	80,795
September 28	3:30 p.m.	No. 14 Oklahoma	No. 22	Notre Dame Stadium; Notre Dame, IN	NBC	L 21–35	80,795
October 5	7:30 p.m.	vs. No. 22 Arizona State		AT&T Stadium; Arlington, TX (Shamrock Series)	NBC	W 37–34 (vacated)	66,690
October 19	7:30 p.m.	USC		Notre Dame Stadium; Notre Dame, IN (rivalry)	NBC	W 14–10 (vacated)	80,795
October 26	5:00 p.m.	at Air Force		Falcon Stadium; Colorado Springs, CO (rivalry)	CBSSN	W 45–10 (vacated)	44,672
November 2	3:30 p.m.	Navy		Notre Dame Stadium; Notre Dame, IN (rivalry)	NBC	W 38–34 (vacated)	80,795
November 9	8:00 p.m.	at Pittsburgh	No. 24	Heinz Field; Pittsburgh, PA (rivalry)	ABC	L 21–28	65,500
November 23	3:30 p.m.	BYU		Notre Dame Stadium; Notre Dame, IN	NBC	W 23–13 (vacated)	80,795
November 30	7:00 p.m.	at No. 8 Stanford	No. 25	Stanford Stadium; Stanford, CA (rivalry)	FOX	L 20–27	50,537
December 28	12:15 p.m.	vs. Rutgers	No. 25	Yankee Stadium; Bronx, NY (Pinstripe Bowl)	ESPN	W 29–16 (vacated)	47,122
Rankings from AP Poll released prior to the game; All times are in Eastern time

^{‡}Former NCAA Attendance Record (September 7, 2013 – September 10, 2016)

== Rankings ==
Ranking movements Legend: ██ Increase in ranking ██ Decrease in ranking — = Not ranked RV = Received votes
	Week															
Poll	Pre	1	2	3	4	5	6	7	8	9	10	11	12	13	14	Final
AP	14	14	21	22	22	RV	RV	RV	RV	RV	24	RV	RV	25	25	20
Coaches	11	13	21	21	22	RV	RV	RV	RV	25	25	RV	RV	RV	RV	24
Harris	Not released							RV	RV	RV	25	RV	RV	25	RV	Not released
BCS	Not released								—	25	23	—	—	25	—	Not released

== Before the season ==
From the 2012 Notre Dame Fighting Irish football team that advanced to the national championship game, the Irish lost multiple key players to the 2013 NFL draft, including tight end Tyler Eifert (first round), linebacker Manti Te'o (second round), safety Jamoris Slaughter (sixth round), running back Theo Riddick (sixth round), defensive end Kapron Lewis-Moore, and safety Zeke Motta (seventh round).

Starting quarterback Everett Golson also left the program after being suspended due to an academic violation. Several Notre Dame players also transferred out of the program, including reserve quarterback Gunner Kiel, wide receivers Davonte Neal and Justin Ferguson. and Chris Badger.

Incoming transfers for the 2014 season included Alex Wulfeck.

The only "change" in the coaching staff after the 2012 season was that Brian Kelly turned over play-calling duties to offensive coordinators Chuck Martin.

== Game summaries ==
=== Temple ===
Team	1	2	3	4	Total
Owls	0	6	0	0	6
• #11 Fighting Irish	14	7	7	0	28

- Date: August 31
- Location: Notre Dame Stadium
  South Bend, IN
- Game start: 3:42pm
- Elapsed time: 3:10
- Game attendance: 80,795
- Game weather: Temp: 75 • Wind: NW 5 • Weather: Partly cloudy
- Referee: Jeff Heaser
- TV announcers (NBC): Dan Hicks, Mike Mayock & Alex Flanagan

=== Michigan ===
Rivalry Game

Team	1	2	3	4	Total
#13 Fighting Irish	7	6	7	10	30
• #17 Wolverines	10	17	7	7	41

- Date: September 7
- Location: Michigan Stadium
  Ann Arbor, MI
- Game start: 8:12pm
- Elapsed time: 3:30
- Game attendance: 115,109
- Game weather: Temp: 75 • Wind: SW 5 • Weather: Partly cloudy
- Referee: David Epperley, ACC
- TV announcers (ESPN): Brent Musburger, Kirk Herbstreit & Heather Cox

Following its game against Temple, Notre Dame played the Michigan Wolverines in Ann Arbor. Notre Dame won the previous meeting 13–6. Billed as "Under the Lights II", this was the second night game in Michigan Stadium's history; the previous game also featured Notre Dame. Tom Harmon was honored as a Michigan Football Legends, and his #98 jersey was unretired and given to quarterback Devin Gardner.

Michigan won the game, 41–30. The game attendance of 115,109 was the largest crowd ever to watch a college football game. Quarterback Devin Gardner completed 21 of 33 passes for 294 yards and four touchdowns while throwing one interception. Gardner has also rushed for 134 yards and three rushing touchdowns in the first two games of the season. Gardner contributed 376 yards of total offense against Notre Dame ranks as the tenth best performance in Michigan history, as reflected in the following list. The only two Michigan players to contribute more total yards in a single game are Denard Robinson and John Navarre. Wide receiver Jeremy Gallon caught eight passes for 184 yards and three touchdowns and rushed for 14 yards. Gallon's 184 receiving yards against Notre Dame is tied for the sixth highest single-game performance in Michigan history. On defense, cornerback Blake Countess had two interceptions for Michigan.

References to chickens were a widely reported side story to the game. After Notre Dame announced one year earlier that it would terminate the rivalry after the 2014 season, Michigan head coach Brady Hoke said Notre Dame was "chickening out". When ESPN commentator Lee Corso made his pick for the game during the College GameDay show (which was in Ann Arbor for the game), he brought out a live chicken, and fans in the background carried signs with poultry references, including "Cluck of the Irish." At the end Michigan's 41–30 victory, in what Chantel Jennings of ESPN.com called the "Dig of the Day", the speakers at Michigan Stadium loudly played the "Chicken Dance" as Michigan fans "danced in the stands."

The win made Michigan favorites in the Big Ten Conference.

=== Purdue ===
Shillelagh Trophy

Team	1	2	3	4	Total
• #21 Fighting Irish	0	3	7	21	31
Boilermakers	7	3	7	7	24

- Date: September 14
- Location: Ross–Ade Stadium
  West Lafayette, IN
- Game start: 8:12pm
- Elapsed time: 3:18
- Game attendance: 61,127
- Game weather: Temp: 68 F • Wind: E 4 • Weather: Dry
- Referee: Ron Cherry
- TV announcers (ABC): Brent Musburger, Kirk Herbstreit & Heather Cox

=== Michigan State ===
Megaphone Trophy

Team	1	2	3	4	Total
#24 Spartans	0	7	3	3	13
• #21 Fighting Irish	3	7	0	7	17

- Date: September 21
- Location: Notre Dame Stadium
  South Bend, IN
- Game start: 3:43pm
- Elapsed time: 3:29
- Game attendance: 80,795
- Game weather: Temp: 65 • Wind: 14 NW • Weather: Partly sunny
- Referee: Dave Witvoe
- TV announcers (NBC): Dan Hicks, Mike Mayock & Alex Flanagan

=== Oklahoma ===
Team	1	2	3	4	Total
• #12 Sooners	14	7	6	8	35
#22 Fighting Irish	7	0	7	7	21

- Date: September 28
- Location: Notre Dame Stadium
  South Bend, IN
- Game weather: Temp: • Wind: • Weather:
- TV announcers (NBC): Dan Hicks, Mike Mayock & Alex Flanagan

=== Arizona State ===
Shamrock Series

Team	1	2	3	4	Total
#24 Sun Devils	0	13	0	21	34
• Fighting Irish	0	14	10	13	37

- Date: October 5
- Location: AT&T Stadium
  Arlington, TX
- Game weather: Temp: • Wind: • Weather:
- Referee: Brad Allen
- Television network: NBC

=== USC ===
Jeweled Shillelagh

Team	1	2	3	4	Total
Trojans	7	3	0	0	10
• Fighting Irish	7	7	0	0	14

- Date: October 19
- Location: Notre Dame Stadium
  South Bend, IN
- Game weather: Temp: • Wind: • Weather:
- Television network: NBC

1st quarter scoring: USC – Silas Redd 1-yard run (Andre Heidari kick); ND – Troy Niklas 7-yard pass from Tommy Rees (Kyle Brindza kick)

2nd quarter scoring: USC – Heidari 22-yard field goal; ND – TJ Jones 11-yard pass from Rees (Brindza kick)

=== Air Force ===
Team	1	2	3	4	Total
• Fighting Irish	7	17	14	7	45
Falcons	7	3	0	0	10

- Date: October 26
- Location: Falcon Stadium
  Colorado Springs, CO
- Game weather: Temp: • Wind: • Weather:
- Television network: CBSSN

=== Navy ===
Rivalry Game

Team	1	2	3	4	Total
Midshipmen	7	13	0	14	34
• #25 Fighting Irish	10	7	7	14	38

- Date: November 2
- Location: Notre Dame Stadium
  South Bend, IN
- Game attendance: 80,795
- Game weather: Temp: 45 • Wind: 7 N • Weather: Cloudy
- Television network: NBC

=== Pittsburgh ===
Team	1	2	3	4	Total
#23 Fighting Irish	7	7	7	0	21
• Panthers	0	7	14	7	28

- Date: November 9
- Location: Heinz Field
  Pittsburgh, PA
- Game start: 8pm ET
- Game attendance: 65,500
- Game weather: Temp: • Wind: • Weather:
- Television network: ABC/ESPN

Although Notre Dame's sports teams have joined the Atlantic Coast Conference (which Pittsburgh has also joined), the Panthers will be the only ACC team on Notre Dame's football schedule this year, as the agreement to play five ACC teams each year does not begin until 2014.

=== BYU ===
Team	1	2	3	4	Total
Cougars	7	0	6	0	13
• Fighting Irish	14	3	3	3	23

- Date: November 23
- Location: Notre Dame Stadium
  South Bend, IN
- Game start: 3:42pm
- Game attendance: 80,795
- Game weather: Temp: • Wind: • Weather:
- TV announcers (NBC): Dan Hicks, Mike Mayock, Alex Flanagan

=== Stanford ===
Legends Trophy

Team	1	2	3	4	Total
#25 Fighting Irish	3	3	14	0	20
• #8 Cardinal	7	7	10	3	27

- Date: November 30
- Location: Stanford Stadium
  Stanford, CA
- Game attendance: 50,537
- Game weather: Temp: • Wind: • Weather:
- TV announcers (Fox): Gus Johnson, Charles Davis

=== Rutgers (Pinstripe Bowl) ===
New Era Pinstripe Bowl

Team	1	2	3	4	Total
Scarlet Knights	10	3	0	3	16
• #25 Fighting Irish	10	3	3	13	29

- Date: Saturday, December 28, 2013
- Location: Yankee Stadium
  Bronx, NY
- Game start: 12:00
- Elapsed time: 3:50
- Game attendance: 47,122
- Game weather: Temp: 34 • Wind: • Weather: Haze
- TV announcers (ESPN): Chris Fowler, Jesse Palmer, & Paul Carcaterra

== Personnel ==
2013 Notre Dame Fighting Irish football team roster
Players
Coaches
Offense

Pos.	#	Name	Class
RB	1	Greg Bryant	Fr
WR	2	Chris Brown	So
RB	3	Amir Carlisle	Jr
RB	4	George Atkinson III	Jr
QB	6	Charlie Fiessinger	Jr
WR	7	TJ Jones	Sr
QB	8	Malik Zaire	Fr
TE	9	Mike Heuerman	Fr
WR	10	DaVaris Daniels	Jr
QB	11	Tommy Rees	Sr
QB	12	Andrew Hendrix	Sr
QB	13	Will Cronin	Sr
WR	14	Luke Massa	Sr
WR	15	William Fuller	Fr
WR	16	Torii Hunter Jr.	Fr
WR	17	James Onwualu	Fr
TE	18	Ben Koyack	Jr
WR	20	C.J. Prosise	So
RB	25	Tarean Folston	Fr
RB	32	Will Mahone	So
RB	33	Cam McDaniel	Jr
WR	37	Eric Lee	Jr
WR	38	Nick Fitzpatrick	Sr
WR	46	Josh Anderson	So
RB	49	Tyler Plantz	Sr
C	51	Bruce Heggie	Sr
TE	56	Ben Suttman	Fr
OL	57	Hunter Bivin	Fr
OL	60	John Montelus	Fr
OL	62	Colin McGovern	Fr
C	65	Conor Hanratty	Jr
G	66	Chris Watt	GS
OL	67	Kevin Carr	Sr
OL	68	Mike McGlinchey	Fr
OT	70	Zack Martin	GS
G	72	Nick Martin	Jr
G	74	Christian Lombard	Sr
OL	75	Mark Harrell	So
C	77	Matt Hegarty	Jr
OT	78	Ronnie Stanley	So
OL	79	Steve Elmer	Fr
TE	80	Durham Smythe	Fr
WR	81	Omar Hunter	Fr
TE	82	Alex Welch	Sr
WR	83	Gerard Martinez	So
TE	85	Troy Niklas	Jr
TE	86	Buster Sheridan	Fr
WR	87	Daniel Smith	Sr
WR	88	Corey Robinson	Fr

Defense

Pos.	#	Name	Class
DL	1	Louis Nix III	Sr
CB	2	Bennett Jackson	Sr
CB	6	KeiVarae Russell	So
DL	7	Stephon Tuitt	Jr
MLB	8	Kendall Moore	Sr
LB	9	Jaylon Smith	Fr
S	10	Max Redfield	Fr
OLB	11	Ishaq Williams	Jr
CB	12	Devin Butler	Fr
OLB	13	Danny Spond	Sr
S	16	Eilar Hardy	Jr
LB	19	Doug Randolph	Fr
CB	21	Jalen Brown	Jr
S	22	Elijah Shumate	So
CB	23	Lo Wood	Sr
CB	24	Josh Atkinson	Jr
CB	26	Rashad Kinlaw	Fr
S	28	Austin Collinsworth	Sr
S	29	Nicky Baratti	So
OLB	30	Ben Councell	Jr
S	31	John Turner	So
CB	34	Jesse Bongiovi	Fr
CB	35	Joe Romano	Sr
CB	36	Cole Luke	Fr
MLB	38	Joe Schmidt	Jr
S	39	Drew Recker	Fr
S	41	Matthias Farley	Jr
LB	42	Michael Deeb	Fr
S	43	Ernie Soto	Jr
MLB	44	Carlo Calabrese	GS
OLB	45	Romeo Okwara	So
S	46	Eamon McOsker	So
CB	47	Connor Cavalaris	Jr
MLB	48	Dan Fox	GS
DL	50	Chase Hounshell	Jr
LB	52	Austin Larkin	Fr
DL	53	Justin Utupo	Sr
OLB	55	Prince Shembo	Sr
OLB	56	Anthony Rabasa	Jr
MLB	59	Jarrett Grace	Jr
DL	69	Tony Springmann	Jr
DL	86	Arturo Martinez	Sr
DL	89	Jacob Matuska	Fr
DL	90	Isaac Rochell	Fr
DL	91	Sheldon Day	So
DL	92	Tyler Stockton	GS
OLB	93	Connor Little	Jr
DL	94	Jarron Jones	So
DL	95	Marquis Dickerson	Fr
DL	96	Kona Schwenke	Sr

Special teams

Pos.	#	Name	Class
K	27	Kyle Brindza	Jr
K	39	Jude Rhodes	Sr
K	40	Nick Tausch	GS
K	43	John Chereson	Fr
LS	61	Scott Daly	So
P	84	Andrew Antognoli	Fr
P	98	Alex Wulfeck	Sr
LS	99	Hunter Smith	So

Head coach

- Brian Kelly

Coordinators/assistant coaches

- Bob Diaco – Assistant Head Coach/Defensive Coord./Linebackers
- Paul Longo – Director of Football Strength and Conditioning
- Chuck Martin – Offensive Coordinator/Quarterbacks
- Tony Alford – Running Backs/Slot Wide Receivers/Recruiting Coord.
- Scott Booker – Tight Ends/Special Teams Coordinator
- Kerry Cooks – Co-Defensive Coordinator/Cornerbacks
- Mike Denbrock – Outside Wide Receivers/Passing Game Coordinator
- Bob Elliott – Safeties
- Mike Elston – Defensive Line
- Harry Hiestand – Offensive Line
- Corey Brown – Graduate Assistant (Defense)
- David Grimes – Assistant Strength & Conditioning Coach
- Tyler McDermott – Graduate Assistant (Offense)
- Josh Reardon – Graduate Assistant (Defense)
- Pat Welsh – Graduate Assistant (Offense)
- Tim Collins – Video Coordinator
- Julie DeBuysser – Senior Staff Assistant-Assistant Coaches
- Ryan Grooms – Head Football Equipment Manager
- Rob Hunt – Head Football Athletic Trainer
- Ernest Jones – Director of Player Development and Engagement
- Chad Klunder – Associate Athletic Director for Football Operations
- Sarah Lawless – Coordinator of On-Campus Recruiting
- David Peloquin – Director of Player Personnel
- Beth Rex – Director of Football Administration
- J.R. Sandlin – Recruiting Analyst
- Joy Schosker – Senior Staff Assistant

Legend

- (C) Team captain
- (S) Suspended
- (I) Ineligible
- Injured
- Redshirt

Roster

=== Recruiting class ===
Notre Dame received 24 commitments in its 2013 recruiting class, including four five-star recruits: outside linebacker Jaylon Smith, defensive tackle Eddie Vanderdoes, running back Greg Bryant, and defensive back Max Redfield. Vanderdoes later decommitted to play at UCLA, citing family health issues that required him to be closer to home.

College recruiting (2013)
Name	Hometown	School	Height	Weight	40^{‡}	Commit date
Hunter Bivin; OT	Owensboro, KY	Apollo HS	6 ft 7 in (2.01 m)	288 lb (131 kg)	5.1	Mar 24, 2012
Hunter Bivin; OT	Recruit ratings: Scout: Rivals: (84)					
Greg Bryant; RB	Delray Beach, FL	American Heritage HS	5 ft 11 in (1.80 m)	197 lb (89 kg)	4.48	Dec 9, 2012
Greg Bryant; RB	Recruit ratings: Scout: Rivals: (88)					
Devin Butler; DB	Washington, DC	Gonzaga College HS	6 ft 1 in (1.85 m)	180 lb (82 kg)	4.6	Apr 4, 2012
Devin Butler; DB	Recruit ratings: Scout: Rivals: (83)					
Michael Deeb; LB	Plantation, FL	American Heritage School	6 ft 2 in (1.88 m)	237 lb (108 kg)	–	Jun 29, 2012
Michael Deeb; LB	Recruit ratings: Scout: Rivals: (81)					
Steven Elmer; OT	Midland, MI	Midland HS	6 ft 6 in (1.98 m)	305 lb (138 kg)	5.0	Sep 17, 2011
Steven Elmer; OT	Recruit ratings: Scout: Rivals: (81)					
Tarean Folston; RB	Cocoa, FL	Cocoa HS	5 ft 10 in (1.78 m)	190 lb (86 kg)	4.5	Jan 2, 2013
Tarean Folston; RB	Recruit ratings: Scout: Rivals: (85)					
Will Fuller; WR	Philadelphia, PA	Roman Catholic HS	6 ft 1 in (1.85 m)	168 lb (76 kg)	–	Aug 5, 2012
Will Fuller; WR	Recruit ratings: Scout: Rivals: (73)					
Mike Heuerman; TE	Naples, FL	Barron Collier HS	6 ft 4 in (1.93 m)	220 lb (100 kg)	4.7	Apr 26, 2012
Mike Heuerman; TE	Recruit ratings: Scout: Rivals: (82)					
Torii Hunter, Jr. WR	Prosper, TX	Prosper HS	6 ft 0 in (1.83 m)	172 lb (78 kg)	4.5	Sep 23, 2012
Torii Hunter, Jr. WR	Recruit ratings: Scout: Rivals: (84)					
Rashad Kinlaw; ATH/DB	Galloway, NJ	Absegami HS	6 ft 2 in (1.88 m)	184 lb (83 kg)	4.5	Mar 26, 2012
Rashad Kinlaw; ATH/DB	Recruit ratings: Scout: Rivals: (82)					
Cole Luke; CB	Chandler, AZ	Hamilton HS	6 ft 0 in (1.83 m)	165 lb (75 kg)	–	Nov 1, 2012
Cole Luke; CB	Recruit ratings: Scout: Rivals: (80)					
Jacob Matuska; DE	Columbus, OH	Bishop Hartley HS	6 ft 5 in (1.96 m)	245 lb (111 kg)	–	Mar 7, 2012
Jacob Matuska; DE	Recruit ratings: Scout: Rivals: (76)					
Mike McGlinchey; OT	Philadelphia, PA	William Penn Charter School	6 ft 8 in (2.03 m)	280 lb (130 kg)	–	Mar 25, 2012
Mike McGlinchey; OT	Recruit ratings: Scout: Rivals: (82)					
Colin McGovern; OT	New Lenox, IL	Lincoln-Way West HS	6 ft 7 in (2.01 m)	290 lb (130 kg)	5.4	Mar 24, 2012
Colin McGovern; OT	Recruit ratings: Scout: Rivals: (84)					
John Montelus; OL	Everett, MA	Everett HS	6 ft 5 in (1.96 m)	315 lb (143 kg)	–	Apr 21, 2012
John Montelus; OL	Recruit ratings: Scout: Rivals: (79)					
James Onwualu; RB/WR	Saint Paul, MN	Cretin-Derham HS	6 ft 1 in (1.85 m)	205 lb (93 kg)	4.51	Mar 14, 2012
James Onwualu; RB/WR	Recruit ratings: Scout: Rivals: (82)					
Doug Randolph; LB	Richmond, VA	Woodberry Forest School	6 ft 3 in (1.91 m)	237 lb (108 kg)	4.7	Sep 7, 2012
Doug Randolph; LB	Recruit ratings: Scout: Rivals: (83)					
Max Redfield; ATH/DB	Mission Viejo, CA	Mission Viejo HS	6 ft 2 in (1.88 m)	195 lb (88 kg)	4.5	Jan 4, 2013
Max Redfield; ATH/DB	Recruit ratings: Scout: Rivals: (88)					
Corey Robinson; WR	San Antonio, TX	San Antonio Christian HS	6 ft 4 in (1.93 m)	197 lb (89 kg)	–	Mar 27, 2012
Corey Robinson; WR	Recruit ratings: Scout: Rivals: (77)					
Isaac Rochell; DE	McDonough, GA	Eagle's Landing Christian Academy	6 ft 5 in (1.96 m)	260 lb (120 kg)	4.71	Jun 7, 2012
Isaac Rochell; DE	Recruit ratings: Scout: Rivals: (83)					
Jaylon Smith; LB	Fort Wayne, IN	Bishop Luers HS	6 ft 3 in (1.91 m)	212 lb (96 kg)	4.5	Jun 2, 2012
Jaylon Smith; LB	Recruit ratings: Scout: Rivals: (90)					
Durham Smythe; TE	Belton, TX	Belton HS	6 ft 5 in (1.96 m)	230 lb (100 kg)	4.8	Jan 27, 2013
Durham Smythe; TE	Recruit ratings: Scout: Rivals: (80)					
Malik Zaire; QB	Kettering, OH	Archbishop Alter HS	6 ft 1 in (1.85 m)	196 lb (89 kg)	4.9	Mar 25, 2012
Malik Zaire; QB	Recruit ratings: Scout: Rivals: (83)					
Overall recruit ranking: Scout: 5 Rivals: 4 ESPN: 4
‡ Refers to 40-yard dash; Note: In many cases, Scout, Rivals, 247Sports, On3, and ESPN may conflict in their listings of height, weight and 40 time.; In these cases, the average was taken. ESPN grades are on a 100-point scale.; Sources: "2013 Notre Dame Football Commitment List". Rivals.; "Scout.com Football Recruiting: Notre Dame". Scout.; "2013 Player Commitments – Notre Dame". ESPN.; "Scout.com Team Recruiting Rankings". Scout.; "2013 Team Ranking". Rivals.com.

== Statistics ==
Passing

1. Tommy Rees - 224 of 414 (54.1%) for 3,257 yards, 27 touchdowns, 13 interceptions, 135.4 passer rating.
2. Andrew Hendrix - 2 of 14 (14.3%) for 56 yards, 0 touchdowns, 0 interceptions, 47.9 passer rating

Rushing

1. Cam McDaniel - 705 yards on 152 carries, 4.6-yard average, 3 touchdowns
2. George Atkinson III - 555 yards on 93 carries, 6.0-yard average, 3 touchdowns
3. Tarean Folston - 470 yards on 88 carries, 5.3-yard average, 3 touchdowns
4. Amir Carlisle - 204 yards on 47 carries, 4.3-yard average, 0 touchdowns

Receiving

1. T. J. Jones (WR) - 70 receptions for 1,108 yards, 15.8-yard average, 9 touchdowns
2. DaVaris Daniels (WR) - 49 receptions for 745 yards, 15.2-yard average, 7 touchdowns
3. Troy Niklas (TE) - 32 receptions for 498 yards, 15.6-yard average, 5 touchdowns
4. Chris Brown (WR) - 15 receptions for 209 yards, 13.9-yard average, 1 touchdown
5. Ben Koyack (TE) - 10 receptions for 171 yards, 17.1-yard average, 3 touchdowns
6. Will Fuller (WR) - 6 receptions for 160 yards, 26.7-yard average, 1 touchdown
7. Corey Robinson (WR) - 9 receptions for 157 yards, 17.4-yard average, 1 touchdown

Scoring

1. Kyle Brindza (K) - 98 points, 38 of 38 PAT, 20 of 26 field goals
2. T.J. Jones (WR) - 66 points, 11 touchdowns
3. DaVaris Daniels (WR) - 42 points, 7 touchdowns
4. Troy Niklas (TE) - 30 points, 5 touchdowns

Tackles

1. Dan Fox (LB) - 95 total tackles, 45 solo tackles, 5.0 tackles for loss
2. Carlo Calabrese (LB) - 91 total tackles, 43 solo tackles, 5.5 tackles for loss
3. Bennett Jackson (CB) - 64 total tackles, 41 solo tackles, 5.0 tackles for loss
4. Jaylon Smith (LB) - 58 total tackles, 35 solo tackles, 5.5 tackles for loss
5. KeiVarae Russell (CB) - 51 total tackles, 40 solo tackles, 1.5 tackles for loss
6. Stephon Tuitt (DL) - 49 total tackles, 24 solo tackles, 9.0 tackles for loss, 7.5 sacks

== Awards and honors ==
Senior wide receiver T. J. Jones tallied 65 receptions for 1,042 yards and was selected by his teammates as the team's most valuable player.

Senior offensive guard Chris Watt and senior inside linebacker Dan Fox received the Nick Pietrosante Award as the player who best exemplified the courage, loyalty, teamwork, dedication and pride of former Notre Dame fullback Nick Pietrosante.

Graduate offensive tackle Zack Martin, who started a school-record 51 games, won the team's Offensive Lineman of the Year award for the fourth consecutive year.

Junior defensive lineman Stephon Tuitt won the team's Defensive Lineman of the Year award.
