= 2013 Pinstripe Bowl =

2013 New Era Pinstripe Bowl
- Notre Dame's win was vacated by the NCAA in 2018.
Rutgers Scarlet Knights	Notre Dame Fighting Irish
(6–6)	(8–4)
The American	Independent
16	29
Head coach: Kyle Flood	Head coach: Brian Kelly
	AP / Coaches / BCS; 25 / NR / NR
	1	2	3	4	Total
Rutgers	10	3	0	3	16
Notre Dame	10	3	3	13	29
- Date: December 28, 2013
- Season: 2013
- Stadium: Yankee Stadium
- Location: Bronx, New York
- MVP: Zack Martin (OT), Notre Dame
- Favorite: Notre Dame by 15½
- Referee: Don Willard (MAC)
- Attendance: 47,122

United States TV coverage
- Network: ESPN
- Announcers: Chris Fowler (play-by-play); Jesse Palmer (analyst); Paul Carcaterra (sidelines)
- Nielsen ratings: 3.3

The 2013 Pinstripe Bowl was an American college football bowl game that was played on December 28, 2013, at Yankee Stadium in the New York City borough of The Bronx. It was one of the 2013–14 bowl games that concluded the 2013 FBS football season. The fourth edition of the Pinstripe Bowl, it featured the Rutgers Scarlet Knights (based in nearby New Brunswick, New Jersey) of the American Athletic Conference against the Notre Dame Fighting Irish, an independent team. It began at 12:00 noon EST and aired on ESPN. The game was sponsored by the New Era Cap Company, and was officially known as the New Era Pinstripe Bowl.

The Fighting Irish accepted their invitation after earning an 8–4 record for the season, while the Scarlet Knights accepted their invitation after earning a 6–6 record. Notre Dame defeated Rutgers by a score of 29–16; however, Notre Dame's win was vacated by the NCAA in February 2018, due to an academic cheating scandal.

This was the final game for Rutgers as a member of the American Athletic Conference. They joined the Big Ten Conference in the 2014 season, and the Pinstripe Bowl followed suit with a conference tie-in with the Big Ten starting in 2014.

== Teams ==
The game featured the Rutgers Scarlet Knights of the American Athletic Conference against the Notre Dame Fighting Irish. It was originally set to feature the Big 12 Conference's seventh bowl-eligible team; however, the conference had only six bowl-eligible teams, leading to Notre Dame accepting the at-large bid.

This was the final game with the two conference tie-ins which had been in place since the bowl's inception in 2010, as from 2014 until at least 2019, the tie-ins will belong to the Big Ten Conference and the Atlantic Coast Conference. However, both Rutgers and Notre Dame could hypothetically return to the game under the new format, as the Scarlet Knights will be a member of the Big Ten and the Fighting Irish, as a non-football member of the ACC, will have access to the conference's sub-College Football Playoff "New Year's Six" bowl arrangements.

=== Rutgers Scarlet Knights ===
After the previous season saw the Scarlet Knights win the Big East Conference's co-championship with a 9–4 overall (5–2 conference) record, expectations diminished slightly for the next season, in particular with the influx of new teams joining the conference, which by season's beginning had transformed into the American Athletic Conference. While the Scarlet Knights' struggles were tougher than expected, finishing 3–5 in conference play, they managed to finish at 6–6 with a 31–6 victory over the South Florida Bulls in the season's final game, after which bowl director Mark Holtzman extended an invitation to play in the game.

This was the Scarlet Knights' second Pinstripe Bowl; Rutgers had previously won the 2011 game, defeating the Iowa State Cyclones by a score of 27–13. In addition, it was the Rutgers' final game as a member of the American before moving to the Big Ten Conference for 2014.

=== Notre Dame Fighting Irish ===
After the success of the previous season which led to a berth in the 2013 BCS National Championship Game (which they lost to Alabama by a score of 42–14), the Irish's expectations were moderately scaled back because of various departures. However, the Irish still managed a winning season at 8–4 overall, after which bowl director Mark Holtzman extended an invitation to play in the game.

Although this was to be Notre Dame's first Pinstripe Bowl, the Fighting Irish were no strangers to Yankee Stadium or its predecessor. The Irish best remember Yankee Stadium as a frequent battleground for their rivalry with the Army Black Knights, it being the site of their games from 1923 to 1946 (with the exception of 1930's game), as well as in 1969 and 2010, with notable matchups including the famous "Win one for the Gipper" game in 1926, which saw the Irish triumph by a score of 7–0, as well as the 1946 "Game of the Century" between #2 Notre Dame and #1 Army which ended in a scoreless tie. Overall, the Irish were 15–5–3 in said games at Yankee Stadium.

== Game summary ==
Placekicker Kyle Brindza of Notre Dame set a Pinstripe Bowl record with five field goals in a game.

=== Box score ===
Quarter	1	2	3	4	Total
Rutgers	10	3	0	3	16
Notre Dame	10	3	3	13	29

at Yankee Stadium, Bronx, New York

- Date: December 28, 2013
- Game time: 12:15 p.m. EST

Scoring summary

Quarter	Time	Drive			Team	Scoring information	Score	
Quarter	Time	Plays	Yards	TOP	Team	Scoring information	Rutgers	Notre Dame
1	10:05	14	71	4:55	ND	21-yard field goal by Kyle Brindza	0	3
1	8:00	4	2	0:56	RUT	36-yard field goal by Kyle Federico	3	3
1	4:30	7	62	3:30	ND	T. J. Jones 8-yard touchdown run, Brindza kick good	3	10
1	1:51	5	75	2:39	RUT	Brandon Coleman 14-yard touchdown reception from Chas Dodd, Federico kick good	10	10
2	12:59	4	1	0:58	ND	38-yard field goal by Brindza	10	13
2	8:35	12	63	4:24	RUT	18-yard field goal by Federico	13	13
3	6:03	15	71	7:17	ND	26-yard field goal by Brindza	13	16
4	12:46	15	90	6:27	ND	25-yard field goal by Brindza	13	19
4	8:57	8	15	3:49	RUT	47-yard field goal by Federico	16	19
4	3:38	10	79	5:19	ND	Tarean Folston 3-yard touchdown run, Brindza kick good	16	26
4	2:28	4	4	0:59	ND	49-yard field goal by Brindza	16	29
"TOP" = time of possession. For other American football terms, see Glossary of American football.							16	29

=== Statistics ===
Statistics	RU	ND
First downs	16	31
Total yards	236	494
Rushes-yards (net)	26-80	43-175
Passing yards (net)	156	319
Passes, Comp-Att-Int	10-29-4	27-47-0
Time of Possession	21:43	38:17

== Academic cheating controversy ==
Following the revelation that several Notre Dame player's had academically cheated during their time on the football team, the NCAA ruled that Notre Dame's wins from the 2012 and 2013 seasons would be vacated, including the Pinstripe Bowl win.
