= George Atkinson III =

American football player (1992–2019)

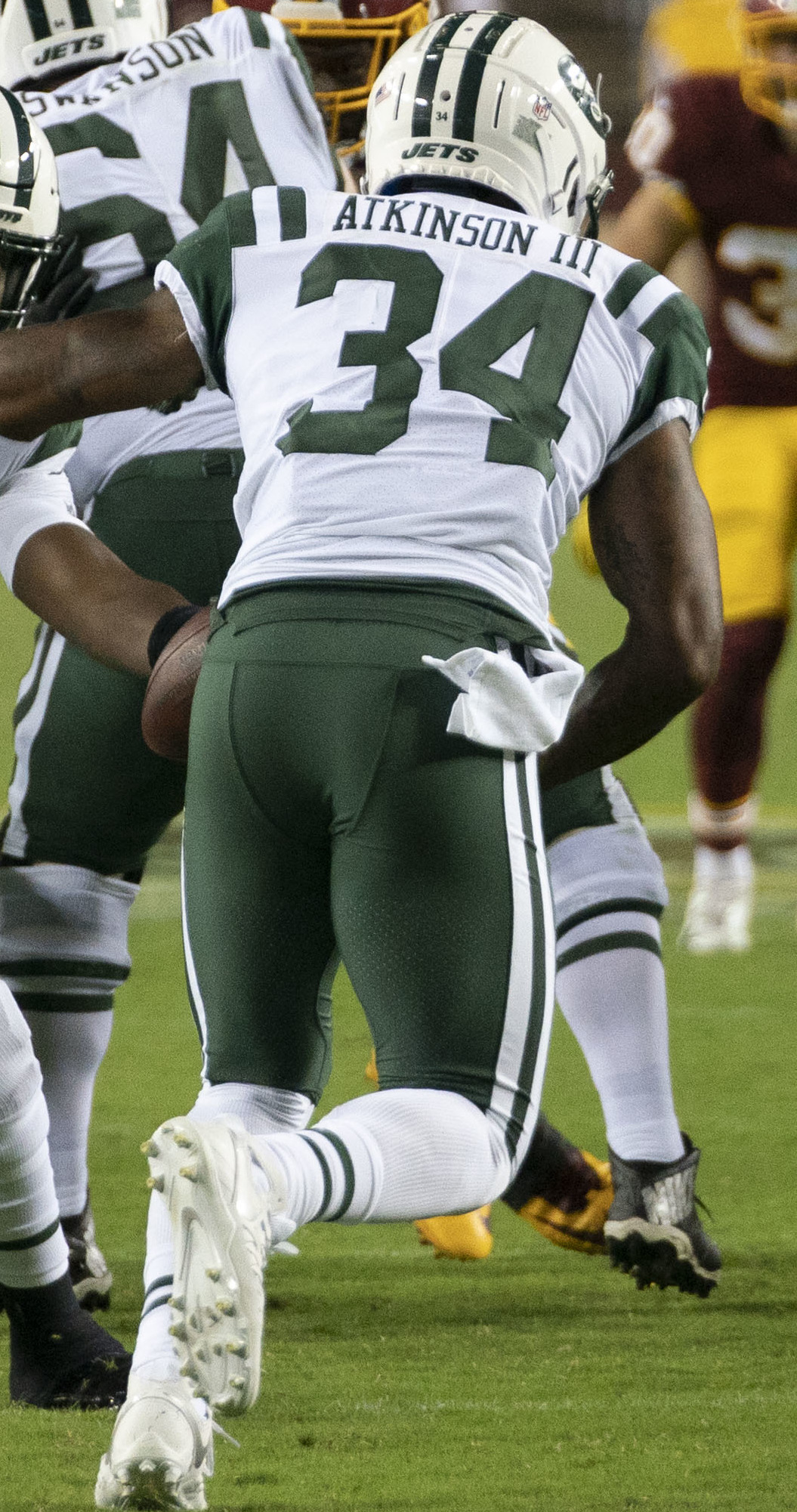
- Atkinson with the New York Jets in 2018

No. 34, 25
- Position: Running back

Personal information
- Born: November 29, 1992; Oakland, California, U.S.
- Died: December 2, 2019 (aged 27)
- Listed height: 6 ft 1 in (1.85 m)
- Listed weight: 220 lb (100 kg)

Career information
- High school: Granada (Livermore, California)
- College: Notre Dame (2011–2013)
- NFL draft: 2014: undrafted

Career history
- Oakland Raiders (2014–2015); Cleveland Browns (2016); Oakland Raiders (2017)*; Kansas City Chiefs (2017–2018)*; New York Jets (2018)*
- * Offseason or practice squad member only

Career NFL statistics
- Rushing attempts: 7
- Rushing yards: 34
- Return yards: 271
- Total touchdowns: 1
- Stats at Pro Football Reference

George Henry Atkinson III (November 29, 1992 – December 2, 2019) was an American professional football player who was a running back in the National Football League (NFL). He played college football for the Notre Dame Fighting Irish. He signed with the Oakland Raiders as an undrafted free agent in 2014, and also played for the Cleveland Browns, the Kansas City Chiefs, and the New York Jets.

As a rookie with Oakland in 2014, Atkinson began the season on the practice squad until he was activated late in the season and contributed mostly on special teams. He spent most of 2015 on the Raiders' practice squad. Atkinson joined Cleveland in 2016. He played on special teams for all 16 games and also saw time at running back in the season finale. In 2017, Atkinson again tried out with the Raiders, but was released and landed on the practice squad for Kansas City. He spent training camp with the Jets in 2018.

== Early life ==
Atkinson and his twin brother Josh were born to Michelle Martin and former Oakland Raiders safety George Atkinson II. Growing up, their mother suffered from paranoid schizophrenia and drug addiction, and she was institutionalized. The twins were sent to live with their father when they were 13.

Atkinson attended Granada High School in Livermore, California, where he played high school football for the Matadors. He was selected Bay Area News Group athlete of the week after a win over Amador Valley High school football team. He participated in the U.S. Army All-American Bowl and served as captain of West team. He was selected to the all-metro first-team as a utility player in high school.

Atkinson was also a standout athlete on the school's track & field team, where he competed as a sprinter. As a sophomore in 2009, he finished third in the 100 meters (10.66s) and fourth in the 200 meters (21.46s) in the finals of the state meet, and placed second in his heat in the prelims of the 200 meters with a career-best time of 21.30 seconds. As a junior, he suffered a late-season hamstring injury and missed most of the postseason. He quit the team as a senior in protest over the firing of two of his sprint coaches.

== College career ==
Atkinson and his twin Josh attended the University of Notre Dame, where they played football for the Fighting Irish. Primarily a backup running back with Notre Dame, Atkinson ran for almost 1,000 yards and scored 10 touchdowns over his three-year career. He was their leading kickoff returner each season. In his first year, he was selected to the Freshman All-American second-team by Phil Steele and was an honorable mention All-American by SI.com as a kickoff returner.

As a sophomore in 2012, the Irish went 12–1 and played in the national championship game. Atkinson had his most productive season in 2013 as a junior, when he was third on team in rushing with 555 yards on 93 carries. Late in the season, he lost playing time to Tarean Folston and Cam McDaniel.

Atkinson was also a member of the Irish's track & field team. He ran a personal-best time of 6.85 seconds in the 60 meters at the 2012 GVSU Big Meet, placing third in the prelims. He ran a career-best time of 10.36 seconds in the 100 meters at the 2012 Big East Championships, placing second in the prelims.

== Professional career ==
Pre-draft measurables
Height	Weight	Arm length	Hand span	40-yard dash	10-yard split	20-yard split	20-yard shuttle	Three-cone drill	Vertical jump	Broad jump	Bench press
6 ft 1 3/8 in (1.86 m)	218 lb (99 kg)	33 1/4 in (0.84 m)	9 3/8 in (0.24 m)	4.48 s	1.61 s	2.64 s	4.33 s	7.07 s	38.0 in (0.97 m)	10 ft 1 in (3.07 m)	19 reps

=== Oakland Raiders ===
On May 16, 2014, Atkinson signed with the Oakland Raiders as an undrafted free agent. He was released by the team on August 30, but re-signed on September 1 to join its practice squad. On November 29, the Raiders signed him to the active roster. He played in five games as rookie, predominantly on special teams, averaging 18.1 yards on seven kickoff returns.

On September 5, 2015, Atkinson was waived by the Raiders. On September 7, 2015, he was signed to the Raiders' practice squad, spending three weeks with the team before being released on September 22. On November 17, he was re-signed to their practice squad.

On September 3, 2016, Atkinson was released by the Raiders as part of final roster cuts.

=== Cleveland Browns ===
The Cleveland Browns claimed Atkinson off waivers on September 4, 2016. He played on special teams in all 16 games during the season, totaling six tackles and eight kickoff returns for an average of 16.9 yards. Atkinson made his regular-season debut at running back in the season finale against the Pittsburgh Steelers. He had seven rushes for 34 yards and his first career rushing touchdown in the 27–24 overtime loss. On July 28, 2017, the Browns waived Atkinson.

=== Oakland Raiders (second stint) ===
Atkinson was claimed off waivers by the Raiders on July 29, 2017. He was waived on September 2.

=== Kansas City Chiefs ===
Atkinson was signed to the Kansas City Chiefs' practice squad on September 19, 2017. He signed a reserve/future contract with the Chiefs on January 10, 2018. He was waived on April 4.

=== New York Jets ===
On July 29, 2018, Atkinson signed with the New York Jets. He was waived on August 31, 2018.

== Personal life ==
Atkinson's twin brother Josh died by suicide on Christmas in 2018. Their mother had died two months before due to complications from Crohn's disease. Atkinson suffered from depression after his brother's death. At one point, he was involuntarily committed to a psychiatric hospital after trying to harm himself due to the pain of Josh's death. In October 2019, Atkinson wrote an open letter on TheUnsealed.com about his mental health struggles. He died on December 2, 2019, three days after his 27th birthday. The cause of death was not initially released. At the time of his death, he left behind a two-year-old daughter.

George was one of at least 345 NFL players to be diagnosed after death with chronic traumatic encephalopathy (CTE), which is caused by repeated hits to the head. His brother Josh was also posthumously diagnosed with CTE.

== See also ==
- List of family relations in American football
- List of NFL players with chronic traumatic encephalopathy (CTE)
