= 2013 Arizona State Sun Devils football team =

American college football season

2013 Arizona State Sun Devils football

Pac-12 South Division champion

Pac-12 Championship Game, L 14–38 vs. Stanford

Holiday Bowl, L 23–37 vs. Texas Tech
- Conference: Pac-12 Conference
- South Division

Ranking
- Coaches: No. 20
- AP: No. 21
- Record: 10–4 (8–1 Pac-12)
- Head coach: Todd Graham (2nd season)
- Offensive coordinator: Mike Norvell (2nd season)
- Offensive scheme: Spread
- Defensive coordinator: Paul Randolph (2nd season)
- Co-defensive coordinator: Chris Ball (1st as coordinator; 2nd overall season)
- Base defense: Multiple
- Home stadium: Sun Devil Stadium

2013 Pac-12 Conference football standings
	Conf.			Overall
Team	W		L	W		L
North Division
No. 11 Stanford xy$	7	–	2	11	–	3
No. 9 Oregon x	7	–	2	11	–	2
No. 25 Washington	5	–	4	9	–	4
Oregon State	4	–	5	7	–	6
Washington State	4	–	5	6	–	7
California	0	–	9	1	–	11
South Division
No. 21 Arizona State xy	8	–	1	10	–	4
No. 16 UCLA	6	–	3	10	–	3
No. 19 USC	6	–	3	10	–	4
Arizona	4	–	5	8	–	5
Utah	2	–	7	5	–	7
Colorado	1	–	8	4	–	8
Championship: Stanford 38, Arizona State 14
$ – BCS representative as conference champion; x – Division champion/co-champions; y – Championship game participant; Rankings from AP Poll

The 2013 Arizona State Sun Devils football team represented Arizona State University in the 2013 NCAA Division I FBS football season. They were led by second-year coach Todd Graham and played their home games at Sun Devil Stadium. They were a member of the South Division of the Pac-12 Conference. The Sun Devils had their best season since 2007, finishing 10–4 and earning a spot in the Pac–12 Championship Game. They also increased their win total and played in a bowl game for the third consecutive season. During the season, the team was featured on The Drive, a weekly documentary series on the Pac-12 Network.

== Departures ==
=== Players drafted ===
Round	Pick	Player	Position	NFL team
UFA	–	Dan Knapp	Offensive lineman	Cincinnati Bengals
UFA	–	Brandon Magee	Linebacker	Dallas Cowboys
UFA	–	Jamal Miles	Wide receiver	Jacksonville Jaguars
UFA	–	Keelan Johnson	Safety	Miami Dolphins
UFA	–	Cameron Marshall	Running back	Miami Dolphins
UFA	–	Deveron Carr	Cornerback	Tampa Bay Buccaneers
UFA	–	Brice Schwab	Offensive lineman	Tampa Bay Buccaneers
UFA	–	Rashad Ross	Wide receiver	Tennessee Titans

== Schedule ==
Date	Time	Opponent	Rank	Site	TV	Result	Attendance
September 5	7:00 pm	Sacramento State*		Sun Devil Stadium; Tempe, AZ	P12N	W 55–0	55,743
September 14	7:30 pm	No. 20 Wisconsin*		Sun Devil Stadium; Tempe, AZ	ESPN	W 32–30	66,159
September 21	4:00 pm	at No. 5 Stanford	No. 23	Stanford Stadium; Stanford, CA	FOX	L 28–42	50,424
September 28	7:30 pm	USC		Sun Devil Stadium; Tempe, AZ	ESPN2	W 62–41	64,987
October 5	4:30 pm	vs. Notre Dame*	No. 22	AT&T Stadium; Arlington, TX (Shamrock Series)	NBC	L 34–37	66,960
October 12	7:00 pm	Colorado		Sun Devil Stadium; Tempe, AZ	P12N	W 54–13	50,104
October 19	3:00 pm	No. 20 Washington^{†}		Sun Devil Stadium; Tempe, AZ	P12N	W 53–24	60,057
October 31	7:30 pm	at Washington State	No. 25	Martin Stadium; Pullman, WA	ESPN	W 55–21	20,617
November 9	1:00 pm	at Utah	No. 23	Rice-Eccles Stadium; Salt Lake City, UT	P12N	W 20–19	45,183
November 16	7:30 pm	Oregon State	No. 21	Sun Devil Stadium; Tempe, AZ	P12N	W 30–17	62,386
November 23	5:00 pm	at No. 14 UCLA	No. 19	Rose Bowl; Pasadena, CA	FOX	W 38–33	70,131
November 30	7:30 pm	Arizona	No. 13	Sun Devil Stadium; Tempe, AZ (Territorial Cup)	P12N	W 58–21	72,542
December 7	5:45 pm	No. 7 Stanford	No. 11	Sun Devil Stadium; Tempe, AZ (Pac-12 Championship Game)	ESPN	L 14–38	69,535
December 30	8:15 pm	vs. Texas Tech*	No. 14	Qualcomm Stadium; San Diego, CA (Holiday Bowl)	ESPN	L 23–37	52,930
*Non-conference game; ^{†}Homecoming; Rankings from AP Poll released prior to game; All times are in Mountain time

== Game summaries ==
=== Sacramento State ===
	1	2	3	4	Total
Hornets	0	0	0	0	0
Sun Devils	14	28	10	3	55

1st quarter scoring: ASU – De'Marieya Nelson 16 yard pass from Taylor Kelly (Gonzalez kick); ASU – Kevin Ozier 41 yard pass from Taylor Kelly (Gonzalez kick).

2nd quarter scoring: ASU – Marion Grice 6 yard run (Gonzalez kick); ASU – Jaelen Strong 24 yard pass from Taylor Kelly (Gonzalez kick); ASU – Chris Coyle 33 yard pass from Taylor Kelly (Gonzalez kick); ASU – Marion Grice 26 yard pass from Taylor Kelly (Gonzalez kick).

3rd quarter scoring: ASU – Zane Gonzalez 40 yard kick; ASU – Michael Eubank 4 yard run (Gonzalez kick).

4th quarter scoring: ASU – Zane Gonzalez 29 yard kick.

=== Wisconsin ===
	1	2	3	4	Total
#20 Badgers	0	14	7	9	30
Sun Devils	3	10	6	13	32

1st quarter scoring: ASU – Zane Gonzalez 34 yard kick.

2nd quarter scoring: WIS – Jacob Pedersen 2 yard pass from Joel Stave (French kick); WIS – Beau Allen 0 yard fumble recovery (French kick); ASU – Marion Grice 1 yard run (Gonzalez kick); Zane Gonzalez 19 yard kick.

3rd quarter scoring: WIS – Melvin Gordon 80 yard run (French kick); ASU – Marion Grice 1 yard run.

4th quarter scoring: WIS – Kyle French 34 yard kick; ASU – Marion Grice 2 yard run; ASU – Marion Grice 12 yard run (Gonzalez kick); WIS – Melvin Gordon 1 yard run.

==== Controversial last play ====
After a couple more completions, the Badgers had the ball at the Sun Devil 13-yard line for 1st and 10. The Badgers were in possession of the football with 18 seconds left, hoping to kick a game-winning field goal. Upon the hike Quarterback Joel Stave knelt in the middle of the field to center the ball for their kicker. Stave then placed the ball quickly on the ground after the play was blown dead by the referee. Replays showed that Stave did get his knee down for a brief second, however Arizona State believed that it was a fumble, and ASU Anthony Jones dove on top of the ball, with the game clock running. At this point Badgers players signalled to the officials, pointing out the delay of game penalty by ASU due to Anthony being top of the football. Umpire Jack Folliard motioned to Stave acknowledging his knee, however the rest of the officiating crew allegedly did not see this signal. The umpire then spotted the ball after a significant delay, but told the Wisconsin offensive line to wait to line up, even though the clock continued to run. Finally, with approximately 2 seconds remaining, the umpire rushed behind the defensive line as Wisconsin tried to run a play to spike the ball and stop the clock but the clock reached zero before the ball was snapped and the game was over.

Initially after the game ASU coach Todd Graham stated "The quarterback put the ball on the ground while he was still standing up, he hadn't been tackled," and "So that should have been a turnover. That should have ended the game." And after watching the footage after the game he acknowledged the officiating error when he stated "You win or you lose. We won and let's move onto the next deal. Obviously, that was a very unusual deal."

The next day saw sports commentators and articles who reported on the "bizarre end" of the game in Tempe. Some even stated that Stave's knee did not touch the ground or that he crouched. This was later countered by other sports commentators, notably columnist Dennis Dodd of CBS Sports that the NCAA handbook states that one simply has to assimilate a kneeling motion.

Ultimately the Pac-12 reprimanded the officiating crew two days after the game ended, deeming that the officials had not acted with enough urgency during the end of the game. Pac-12 Commissioner Larry Scott made a statement when announcing the reprimand; "After a thorough review, we have determined that the officials fell short of the high standard in which the Pac-12 games should be managed. We will continue to work with all our officials to ensure this type of situation never occurs again."

=== Stanford ===
	1	2	3	4	Total
#23 Sun Devils	0	0	7	21	28
#5 Cardinal	13	16	10	3	42

1st quarter scoring: STAN – Ty Montgomery 17 yard pass from Kevin Hogan (Williamson kick); STAN – Tyler Gaffney 1 yard run.

2nd quarter scoring: STAN – Anthony Wilkerson 12 yard run (Williamson kick); STAN – Ty Montgomery 30 yard pass from Kevin Hogan (Williamson kick); STAN – Luke Kaumatule punt block for safety.

3rd quarter scoring: ASU – Marion Grice 2 yard run (Gonzalez kick); STAN – Jordan Williamson 20 yard kick; STAN – Tyler Gaffney 16 yard run (Williamson kick).

4th quarter scoring: ASU – Chris Coyle 45 yard pass from Taylor Kelly (Gonzalez kick); ASU – Jaelen Strong 27 yard pass from Taylor Kelly (Gonzalez kick); ASU – Marion Grice 6 yard pass from Taylor Kelly (Gonzalez kick); STAN – Jordan Williamson 24 yard kick.

=== USC ===
	1	2	3	4	Total
Trojans	7	7	7	20	41
Sun Devils	7	13	28	14	62

1st quarter scoring: ASU – Michael Eubank 1 yard run (Gonzalez kick); USC – Justin Davis 26 yard run (Heidari kick).

2nd quarter scoring: USC – Tre Madden 10 yard pass from Cody Kessler (Heidari kick); ASU – Marion Grice 11 yard pass from Taylor Kelly (Gonzalez kick); ASU – Zane Gonzalez 28 yard kick; ASU – Zane Gonzalez 21 yard kick.

3rd quarter scoring: USC – Tre Madden 24 yard run (Heidari kick); ASU – D. J. Foster 74 yard pass from Taylor Kelly (Gonzalez kick); ASU – Alden Darby 46 yard interception return (Gonzalez kick); ASU – Marion Grice 8 yard pass from Taylor Kelly (Gonzalez kick); ASU – Marion Grice 9 yard run (Gonzalez kick).

4th quarter scoring: USC – Tre Madden 48 yard pass from Cody Kessler; USC – Justin Davis 15 yard run (Heidari kick); ASU – Marion Grice 28 yard run (Gonzalez kick); ASU – Deantre Lewis 1 yard run (Gonzalez kick); USC – Justin Davis 58 yard run (Heidari kick).

=== Notre Dame ===
	1	2	3	4	Total
#22 Sun Devils	0	13	0	21	34
Fighting Irish	0	14	10	13	37

1st quarter scoring:

2nd quarter scoring: ASU – Zane Gonzalez 40 yard kick; Zane Gonzalez 27 yard kick; ND – Ben Koyack 19 yard pass from Tommy Rees (Brindza kick); Jaelen Strong 36 yard pass from Taylor Kelly (Gonzalez kick); TJ Jones 8 yard pass from Tommy Rees (Brindza kick).

3rd quarter scoring: ND – Kyle Brindza 53 yard kick; ND – Troy Niklas 21 yard pass from Tommy Rees (Brindza kick).

4th quarter scoring: ASU – Osahon Irabor 37 yard interception return (Gonzalez kick); ND – Kyle Brindza 33 yard kick; ASU – De'Marieya Nelson 21 yard pass from Taylor Kelly (Gonzalez kick); ND – Kyle Brindza 25 yard kick; ND – Dan Fox 14 yard interception return (Brindza kick); ASU – Marion Grice 16 yard pass from Taylor Kelly (Gonzalez kick).

=== Colorado ===
	1	2	3	4	Total
Buffaloes	0	6	0	7	13
Sun Devils	25	22	7	0	54

1st quarter scoring: ASU – Jaelen Strong 69 yard pass from Taylor Kelly (Gonzalez kick); ASU – Marion Grice 8 yard run (Jaelen Strong pass from Mike Bercovici); ASU – Zane Gonzalez 26 yard kick; ASU – Marion Grice 1 yard run (Gonzalez kick).

2nd quarter scoring: COL – Nelson Spruce 10 yard pass from Sefo Liufau; ASU – Davon Coleman 1 yard pass from Taylor Kelly (Gonzalez kick); ASU – Davon Coleman sack for safety; ASU – Zane Gonzalez 41 yard kick; ASU – Zane Gonzalez 27 yard kick; ASU – Taylor Kelly 17 yard run (Gonzalez kick).

3rd quarter scoring: ASU – R.J. Robinson 1 yard run (Gonzalez kick).

4th quarter scoring: COL – Christian Powell 8 yard run (Oliver kick).

=== Washington ===
	1	2	3	4	Total
#20 Huskies	7	0	10	7	24
Sun Devils	3	26	10	14	53

1st quarter scoring: WASH – Bishop Sankey 1 yard run (Coons kick); ASU – Zane Gonzalez 26 yard kick.

2nd quarter scoring: ASU – Marion Grice 15 yard pass from Taylor Kelly (Gonzalez kick); ASU – Zane Gonzalez 22 yard kick; ASU – Zane Gonzalez 36 yard kick; ASU – Taylor Kelly 1 yard run (Gonzalez kick); ASU – Chris Coyle 14 yard pass from Taylor Kelly (Gonzalez kick).

3rd quarter scoring: WASH – Kevin Smith 70 yard pass from Keith Price (Coons kick); ASU – Taylor Kelly 1 yard run (Gonzalez kick); WASH – Travis Coons 27 yard kick; ASU – Zane Gonzalez 21 yard kick.

4th quarter scoring: ASU – Marion Grice 1 yard run (Gonzalez kick); WASH – Austin Seferian-Jenkins 20 yard pass from Keith Price (Coons kick); ASU – Marion Grice 14 yard run (Gonzalez kick).

=== Washington State ===
	1	2	3	4	Total
#25 Sun Devils	21	21	7	6	55
Cougars	0	14	7	0	21

1st quarter scoring: ASU – Taylor Kelly 7 yard run (Gonzalez kick); Taylor Kelly 6 yard run (Gonzalez kick); ASU – Jaelen Strong 11 yard pass from Taylor Kelly (Gonzalez kick).

2nd quarter scoring: WSU – Gabe Marks 34 yard pass from Connor Halliday (Furney kick); ASU – D.J. Foster 7 yard pass from Taylor Kelly (Gonzalez kick); ASU – Richard Smith 51 yard pass from Taylor Kelly (Gonzalez kick); ASU – Chris Coyle 8 yard pass from Taylor Kelly (Gonzalez kick); WSU – Rickey Galvin 15 yard pass from Connor Halliday (Furney kick).

3rd quarter scoring: WSU – Jeremiah Laufasa 4 yard run (Furney kick); ASU – D.J. Foster 23 yard pass from Taylor Kelly (Gonzalez kick).

4th quarter scoring: ASU – Zane Gonzalez 37 yard kick; ASU – Zane Gonzalez 36 yard kick.

=== Utah ===
	1	2	3	4	Total
#23 Sun Devils	7	0	0	13	20
Utes	6	3	10	0	19

1st quarter scoring: ASU – Taylor Kelly 10 yard run (Gonzalez kick); UTAH – Dres Anderson 8 yard pass from Travis Wilson.

2nd quarter scoring: UTAH – Andy Phillips 51 yard kick.

3rd quarter scoring: UTAH – Andy Phillips 43 yard kick; UTAH – Sean Fitzgerald 12 yard pass from Travis Wilson (Phillips kick).

4th quarter scoring: ASU – Taylor Kelly 2 yard run (Gonzalez kick); Richard Smith 14 yard pass from Taylor Kelly.

=== Oregon State ===
	1	2	3	4	Total
Beavers	0	3	7	7	17
#21 Sun Devils	13	7	0	10	30

1st quarter scoring: ASU – Marion Grice 1 yard run (Gonzalez kick); ASU – D.J. Foster 8 yard run.

2nd quarter scoring: ASU – Marion Grice 1 yard run (Gonzalez kick); OSU – Trevor Romaine 22 yard kick.

3rd quarter scoring: OSU – Caleb Smith 6 yard pass from Sean Mannion (Romaine kick).

4th quarter scoring: ASU – Zane Gonzalez 18 yard kick; ASU – Robert Nelson 23 yard interception return (Gonzalez kick); OSU – Connor Hamlett 29 yard pass from Sean Mannion (Romaine kick).

=== UCLA ===
	1	2	3	4	Total
#19 Sun Devils	14	21	3	0	38
#14 Bruins	10	3	14	6	33

1st quarter scoring: ASU – Taylor Kelly 3 yard run (Gonzalez kick); UCLA – Devin Lucien 42 yard pass from Brett Hundley (Fairbarin kick); UCLA – Kaʻimi Fairbairn 48 yard kick; ASU – D.J. Foster 3 yard run (Gonzalez kick).

2nd quarter scoring: ASU – Carl Bradford 18 yard interception return (Gonzalez kick); ASU – Michael Eubank 1 yard run (Gonzalez kick); UCLA – Kaʻimi Fairbairn 23 yard kick; ASU – Jaelen Strong 19 yard pass from Taylor Kelly (Gonzalez kick).

3rd quarter scoring: UCLA – Myles Jack 3 yard run (Fairbairn kick); UCLA – Paul Perkins 1 yard run (Fairbairn kick); ASU – Zane Gonzalez 28 yard kick.

4th quarter scoring: UCLA – Shaquelle Evans 27 yard pass from Brett Hundley.

Arizona State clinched the Pac-12 South Division Title with this win.

=== Arizona ===
	1	2	3	4	Total
Wildcats	0	7	14	0	21
#13 Sun Devils	13	17	14	14	58

1st quarter scoring: ASU – Zane Gonzalez 38 yard kick; ASU – Zane Gonzalez 21 yard kick; ASU – Darwin Rogers 38 yard pass from Taylor Kelly (Gonzalez kick).

2nd quarter scoring: ASU – D.J. Foster 14 yard run (Gonzalez kick); ASU – De'Marieya Nelson 1 yard run (Gonzalez kick); UA – B.J. Denker 1 yard run (Smith kick); ASU – Zane Gonzalez 23 yard kick.

3rd quarter scoring: UA – Ka'Deem Carey 8 yard run (Smith kick); ASU – Damarious Randall 64 yard interception return (Gonzalez kick); UA – Garic Wharton 4 yard fumble recovery (Smith kick); ASU – Jaelen Strong 61 yard pass from Taylor Kelly (Gonzalez kick).

4th quarter scoring: ASU – D.J. Foster 7 yard run (Gonzalez kick); ASU – De'Marieya Nelson 1 yard run (Gonzalez kick).

=== Stanford (Pac-12 Championship Game) ===
Pac-12 Championship Game

Team	1	2	3	4	Total
• #7 Cardinal	14	14	3	7	38
#11 Sun Devils	7	7	0	0	14

- Location: Sun Devil Stadium
  Tempe, Arizona
- Game start: 5:47 pm (MT)
- Elapsed time: 3:12
- Game attendance: 69,535
- Game weather: Partly cloudy
- Referee: J. Stricherz
- TV announcers (ESPN): Brad Nessler and Todd Blackledge

1st quarter scoring: STAN – Tyler Gaffney 69-yard run (Jordan Williamson kick); ASU – D. J. Foster 51-yard run (Zane Gonzalez kick); STAN – Gaffney 1-yard run (Williamson kick)

2nd quarter scoring: STAN – Ty Montgomery 22-yard run (Williamson kick); STAN – Gaffney 1-yard run (Williamson kick); ASU – Foster 65-yard pass from Taylor Kelly (Gonzalez kick)

3rd quarter scoring: STAN – Williamson 30-yard field goal

4th quarter scoring: STAN – Montgomery 24-yard pass from Kevin Hogan (Williamson kick)

=== Texas Tech (Holiday Bowl) ===
	1	2	3	4	Total
Red Raiders	13	14	10	0	37
#14 Sun Devils	6	7	7	3	23

== Rankings ==
Ranking movements Legend: ██ Increase in ranking ██ Decrease in ranking — = Not ranked RV = Received votes
	Week																
Poll	Pre	1	2	3	4	5	6	7	8	9	10	11	12	13	14	15	Final
AP	RV	RV	RV	23	RV	22	RV	RV	RV	25	23	21	19	13	11	16	21
Coaches	RV	RV	RV	23	RV	24	RV	RV	RV	RV	24	22	22	18	13	17	20
Harris	Not released							RV	RV	25	24	22	22	16	13	17	Not released
BCS	Not released								—	—	22	19	17	12	11	14	Not released

== After the Season ==
=== Players Drafted ===
Round	Pick	Player	Position	NFL team
3	82	Will Sutton	Defensive lineman	Chicago Bears
4	121	Carl Bradford	Outside linebacker	Green Bay Packers
6	201	Marion Grice	Running back	San Diego Chargers
UFA	–	Alden Darby	Defensive back	San Diego Chargers
UFA	–	Robert Nelson	Defensive back	Cleveland Browns
UFA	–	Davon Coleman	Defensive lineman	Dallas Cowboys
UFA	–	Chris Coyle	Tight end	Houston Texans
UFA	–	Chris Young	Linebacker	Houston Texans
UFA	–	Evan Finkenberg	Offensive lineman	Miami Dolphins
