= 2013 BCS National Championship Game =

College football bowl game

2013 Discover BCS National Championship Game
- 15th BCS National Championship Game
Alabama Crimson Tide	Notre Dame Fighting Irish
(12–1)	(12–0 (Note: Notre Dame later vacated all results during the season for an official 0–0 record.))
SEC	Independent
42	14
Head coach: Nick Saban	Head coach: Brian Kelly
AP / Coaches / BCS; 2 / 2 / 2	AP / Coaches / BCS; 1 / 1 / 1
	1	2	3	4	Total
Alabama	14	14	7	7	42
Notre Dame	0	0	7	7	14
- Date: January 7, 2013
- Season: 2012
- Stadium: Sun Life Stadium
- Location: Miami Gardens, Florida
- MVP: Offense: Eddie Lacy (RB, Alabama); Defense: C. J. Mosley (LB, Alabama)
- Favorite: Alabama by 10
- National anthem: Zac Brown Band
- Referee: Land Clark (Pac-12)
- Halftime show: Band of the Fighting Irish; Million Dollar Band
- Attendance: 80,120

United States TV coverage
- Network: ESPN
- Announcers: Brent Musburger (play-by-play); Kirk Herbstreit (analyst); Heather Cox and Tom Rinaldi (sideline)
- Nielsen ratings: 17.5 (26.4 million viewers)

International TV coverage
- Network: ESPN Deportes
- Announcers: Eduardo Varela and Pablo Viruega

The 2013 BCS National Championship Game (branded as the 2013 Discover BCS National Championship Game for sponsorship reasons) was a postseason college football bowl game that took place on Monday, January 7, 2013, at Sun Life Stadium in Miami Gardens, Florida. It featured the No. 1 ranked Notre Dame Fighting Irish and No. 2 Alabama Crimson Tide. In a rematch of the 1973 Sugar Bowl, Alabama routed the Fighting Irish by a 42–14 score to repeat as national champions and took home the Championship Trophy.

Alabama was the defending champion and represented the Southeastern Conference, which had participated in and emerged victorious from every standalone BCS Championship Game (since the format was introduced in the 2006–2007 season). Notre Dame did not belong to a conference and was the first independent team to play in the National Championship game since the start of the BCS.

The National Championship game between Alabama and Notre Dame was anticipated as an historical matchup with a rich tradition in college football. Going into the holiday season after Alabama was assured a spot in the National Championship after beating Georgia in the SEC Championship, sportscasters from both sides weighed in on who was most likely to win. Despite the historical record of, at the time, 5–1 in favor of Notre Dame many sports betting centers had Alabama as a heavy favorite with point spreads favoring Alabama as high as ten points over Notre Dame. Many prominent sports writers predicted Notre Dame to win based on several factors including strong overall defense, an inconsistent Alabama team (often cited as being "exposed" against LSU and Texas A&M), and various intangibles such as destiny and generalized fatigue from the dominant performances of the Southeastern Conference.

In the aftermath of an Alabama 42 to 14 victory (with the score being 35 to 0 at one point in the game), the BCS National Championship game was considered by Sports Illustrated's Michael Rosenberg to have failed to live up to its hype despite dominating television ratings. Mark Schlabach of ESPN.com expressed the wish that a playoff system had been in place wherein Oregon or Florida would have played against Alabama. Tom Coyne of Associated Press concluded that Alabama was more talented and physical with better preparation and execution of its game plan than Notre Dame. Specifically, inconsistent tackling, blown coverages, and porous defense were cited by Aaron Ellis of Forbes.com as major detriments to Notre Dame's efforts.

With the win, Alabama won their second straight BCS championship, their third championship in four years, and their ninth AP championship overall. Alabama was the last team to become back-to-back champions until the Georgia Bulldogs in 2021 and 2022.

On November 22, 2016, Notre Dame was forced to vacate all games from the 2012 season, including this game, as a former student athletic trainer was revealed to have committed academic fraud by doing substantial course work for two players and impermissibly helping six others, rendering some of the players ineligible.

== Point spread ==
While Notre Dame came into the game undefeated and ranked No. 1 in the country, as of January 3, 2013, the point spread on the game according to leading Las Vegas casinos projected Alabama to win by between 9.5 and 10 points. Two billion dollars were expected to be wagered on the game.

== Teams ==
It was the seventh meeting between Alabama and Notre Dame, but the teams' first since 1987. Heading into the game, Notre Dame led the series 5-1-0, which included two bowl victories. The two teams first met in the 1973 Sugar Bowl, with the Irish defeating the Crimson Tide, 24–23. Following the game, Notre Dame was voted national champions by the Associated Press while Alabama had been declared the champion by UPI in a poll taken prior to this Sugar Bowl contest, the last time the final U.P.I./Coaches poll was announced before the bowl games.

=== Alabama ===
During the regular season, Alabama led the nation in total defense, giving up 246.00 yards per game, and in rushing defense by allowing 79.77 yards per game. The team also led the SEC in scoring defense (10.7 points per game) and rushing defense (79.9 yards per game), was second in scoring offense (38.5 points per game) and rushing offense (224.62 yards per game). Key players for the Crimson Tide were quarterback A. J. McCarron, who led the nation in passing efficiency with a 173.08 rating; cornerback Dee Milliner, a Nagurski Award finalist; linebacker C.J. Mosley, a finalist in the Butkus Award; and center Barrett Jones, the National Football Foundation Scholar-Athlete/William V. Campbell Trophy recipient and the Rimington Trophy winner. McCarron gained 5,655 yards for Alabama, which include 5,692 passing yards and losing 37 rushing yards. Alabama averaged 224.6 rushing yards per game without allowing a sack all season.

=== Notre Dame ===
During the regular season, Notre Dame was the national leader in scoring defense (10.3 points per game) and sixth in total defense (286.83 yards per game). Key players for the Fighting Irish were freshman quarterback Everett Golson, who passed for 2,135 yards for 11 touchdowns and rushed for 305 yards for five touchdowns; senior linebacker and Heisman trophy finalist Manti Te'o, who had 103 tackles and seven interceptions, his third-straight 100-plus tackle season for a career 427 tackles; defensive end Stephon Tuitt, who ranked seventh with others in sacks/game (1.00) and needed two sacks to become the school's single-season record holder; guard Mike Golic Jr., who helped the team averaging more than 200 yards per game in both passing and rushing; and tight end Tyler Eifert, the John Mackey Award winner who caught 44 passes for 624 yards and four touchdowns.

== Starting lineups ==
Selected in an NFL Draft (number corresponds to draft round)

† = 2012 All-American

Alabama	Position	Notre Dame
Offense
Amari Cooper 1	WR	T.J. Jones 6
Cyrus Kouandjio 2	LT	Zack Martin 1
†Chance Warmack 1	LG	Chris Watt 3
†Barrett Jones 4	C	Braxston Cave
Anthony Steen	RG	Mike Golic Jr.
D. J. Fluker 1	RT	Christian Lombard
Michael Williams 7	TE	Tyler Eifert 1
Kevin Norwood 4	WR	John Goodman
A. J. McCarron 5	QB	Everett Golson
Eddie Lacy 2	RB	Theo Riddick 6
Defense
Ed Stinson 5	DE	Kapron Lewis-Moore 6
Jesse Williams 5	NT	Louis Nix III 3
Damion Square	DE	Stephon Tuitt 2
Adrian Hubbard	OLB	Prince Shembo 4
Trey DePriest	ILB	Dan Fox
†C.J. Mosley 1	ILB	†Manti Te'o 2
Xzavier Dickson 7	OLB	Danny Spond
Deion Belue	CB	KeiVarae Russell 3
Vinnie Sunseri 5	CB	Bennett Jackson 6
Robert Lester	S	Zeke Motta 7
Ha Ha Clinton-Dix 1	S	Matthias Farley

== Game summary ==
Scoring summary

Quarter	Time	Drive			Team	Scoring information	Score	
Quarter	Time	Plays	Yards	TOP	Team	Scoring information	BAMA	ND
1	12:03	5	82	2:57	BAMA	Eddie Lacy 20-yard touchdown run, Jeremy Shelley kick good	7	0
1	6:14	10	61	4:49	BAMA	Michael Williams 3-yard touchdown reception from A. J. McCarron, Jeremy Shelley kick good	14	0
2	14:56	8	80	4:26	BAMA	TJ Yeldon 1-yard touchdown run, Jeremy Shelley kick good	21	0
2	0:31	9	71	3:12	BAMA	Eddie Lacy 11-yard touchdown reception from A. J. McCarron, Jeremy Shelley kick good	28	0
3	7:34	10	97	5:37	BAMA	Amari Cooper 34-yard touchdown reception from A. J. McCarron, Jeremy Shelley kick good	35	0
3	4:08	9	85	3:26	ND	Everett Golson 2-yard touchdown run, Kyle Brindza kick good	35	7
4	11:27	14	86	7:41	BAMA	Amari Cooper 19-yard touchdown reception from A. J. McCarron, Jeremy Shelley kick good	42	7
4	7:51	10	75	3:36	ND	Theo Riddick 6-yard touchdown reception from Everett Golson, Kyle Brindza kick good	42	14
"TOP" = time of possession. For other American football terms, see Glossary of American football.							42	14

=== Statistics ===
Statistics	BAMA	ND
First downs	28	16
Total offense, plays–yards	73–529	55–302
Rushes-yards (net)	45–265	19–32
Passing yards (net)	264	270
Passes, Comp-Att-Int	20–28–0	21–36–1
Time of possession	38:13	21:47
