= Kapron Lewis-Moore =

American football player (born 1990)

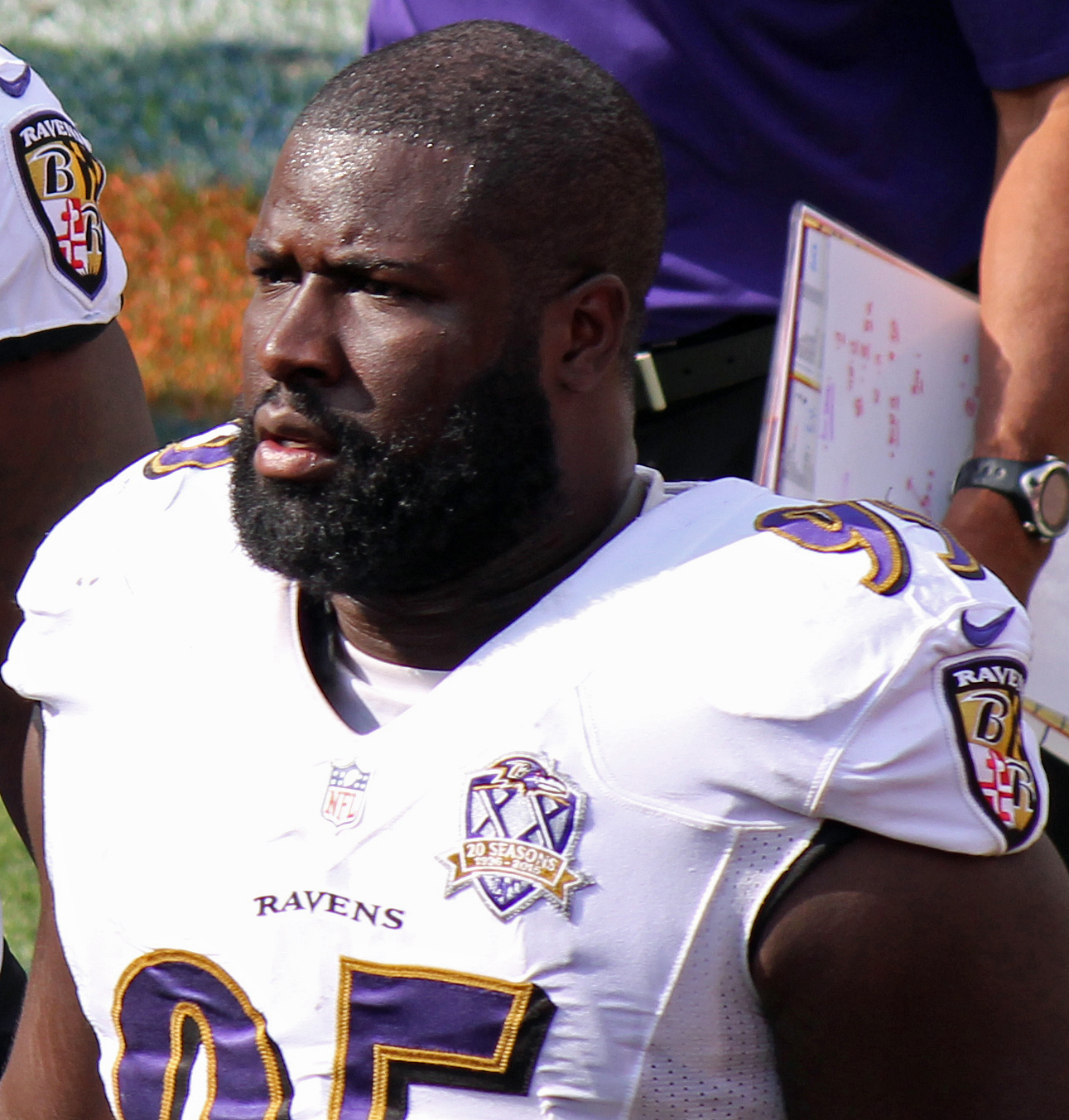
- Lewis-Moore with the Baltimore Ravens in 2015

No. 95
- Position: Defensive end

Personal information
- Born: January 24, 1990 (age 36); Weatherford, Texas, U.S.
- Listed height: 6 ft 4 in (1.93 m)
- Listed weight: 315 lb (143 kg)

Career information
- High school: Weatherford
- College: Notre Dame
- NFL draft: 2013: 6th round, 200th overall pick

Career history
- Baltimore Ravens (2013–2016); Chicago Bears (2017)*; Baltimore Ravens (2017)*; Jacksonville Jaguars (2018)*; San Francisco 49ers (2019)*
- * Offseason or practice squad member only

Career NFL statistics
- Total tackles: 3
- Stats at Pro Football Reference

Kapron Lewis-Moore (born January 24, 1990) is an American former professional football player who was a defensive end in the National Football League (NFL). He was selected by the Baltimore Ravens in the sixth round of the 2013 NFL draft. He played college football for the Notre Dame Fighting Irish.

== Early life ==
Lewis-Moore attended Weatherford High School in Weatherford, Texas. As a junior, he collected 50 tackles and added six sacks, two forced fumbles and three recovered fumbles, and received second-team all-district honors.

Considered a four-star recruit by Rivals.com, he was rated as the No.19 strongside defensive end in the nation. He accepted a scholarship offer from Notre Dame over other offers from Texas A&M and Colorado.

== College career ==
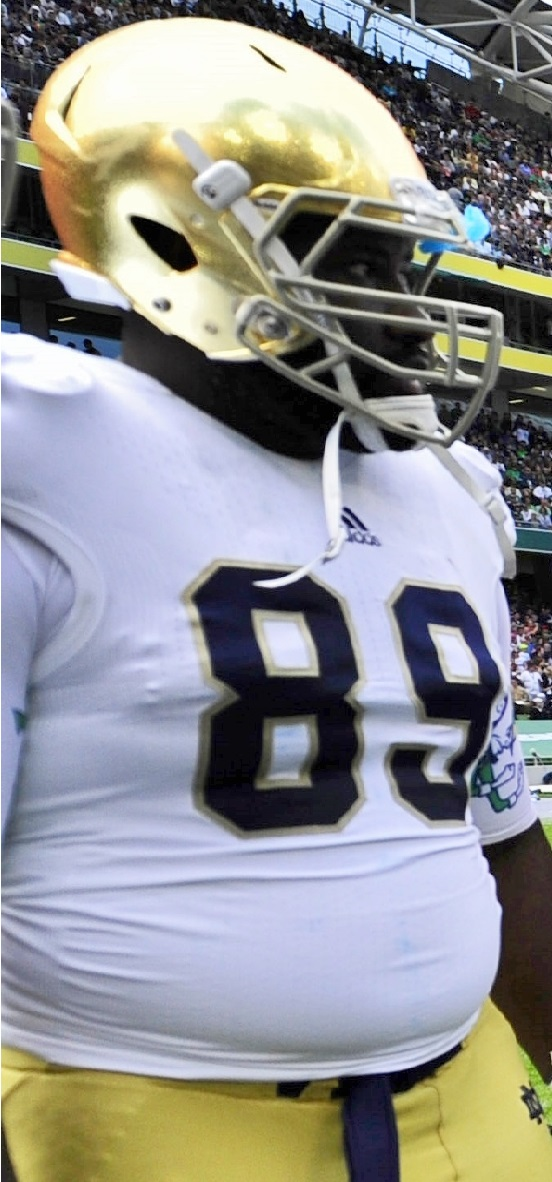
Lewis-Moore with Notre Dame.

Lewis-Moore attended and played college football at Notre Dame from 2008–2012.

After redshirting in 2008, Lewis-Moore made tremendous strides in his development. He appeared in all 12 games and starting nine. He led the Irish defensive line and ranked sixth on team with 46 tackles, recorded second-most tackles for loss on team with seven and his two and a half sacks ranked third, also added one forced fumble and one fumble recovery. In 2010, under new defensive coordinator Bob Diaco, he made the switch from defensive tackle to defensive end in the new 3–4 defense. He started all 13 games in 2010, one of 11 players to start all 13 games for the Irish. He totaled 62 tackles, which ranked fifth on the team but first among defensive linemen, he added two and a half tackles for loss and two sacks. In 2011, he started only 7 games after sustaining a knee injury against USC. He recorded 32 tackles, including four for loss and one and half sacks, and one forced fumble.

Prior to the 2012 season, Lewis-Moore was named one of Notre Dame's four captains. "He called my name last and I wasn’t really expecting it because we have a lot of guys on the team that are worthy of being captains," Lewis-Moore recalled. "To hear my name was really something special. I got a little teary eyed. I knew this season was going to be special but to be captain is just something I can’t really explain. It’s speechless." He started all 13 games for the Irish, but tore his ACL in his right knee in the first half of the 2013 BCS National Championship Game against Alabama. He finished his season with 40 tackles, including eight and a half for loss and six sacks, while forcing two fumbles.

== Professional career ==
Pre-draft measurables
Height	Weight	Arm length	Hand span	Wingspan
6 ft 3 5/8 in (1.92 m)	298 lb (135 kg)	33 5/8 in (0.85 m)	10 in (0.25 m)	6 ft 10 in (2.08 m)
All values from NFL Combine

=== Baltimore Ravens (first stint) ===
Lewis-Moore was selected by the Baltimore Ravens in the sixth round, 200th overall in the 2013 NFL draft. He signed his four-year contract on May 2, 2013. After spending his first two NFL seasons on injured reserve, Lewis-Moore made the Ravens final roster, playing in five games and recording three tackles.

On September 3, 2016, Lewis-Moore was released by the Ravens and was signed to the practice squad the next day, where he spent the entire season.

=== Chicago Bears ===
On January 6, 2017, Lewis-Moore signed a reserve/future contract with the Chicago Bears. He was waived on August 29, 2017.

=== Baltimore Ravens (second stint) ===
On October 10, 2017, Lewis was signed to the Ravens' practice squad.

=== Jacksonville Jaguars ===
On February 6, 2018, Lewis-Moore signed a futures deal with the Jacksonville Jaguars. He was waived/injured by the Jaguars on July 30, 2018, and was placed on injured reserve. He was released on August 8, 2018.

=== San Francisco 49ers ===
On January 4, 2019, Lewis-Moore signed a reserve/future contract with the San Francisco 49ers. He was placed on injured reserve on August 3, 2019. He was released on August 12, 2019.
