= Zack Martin =

American football player (born 1990)

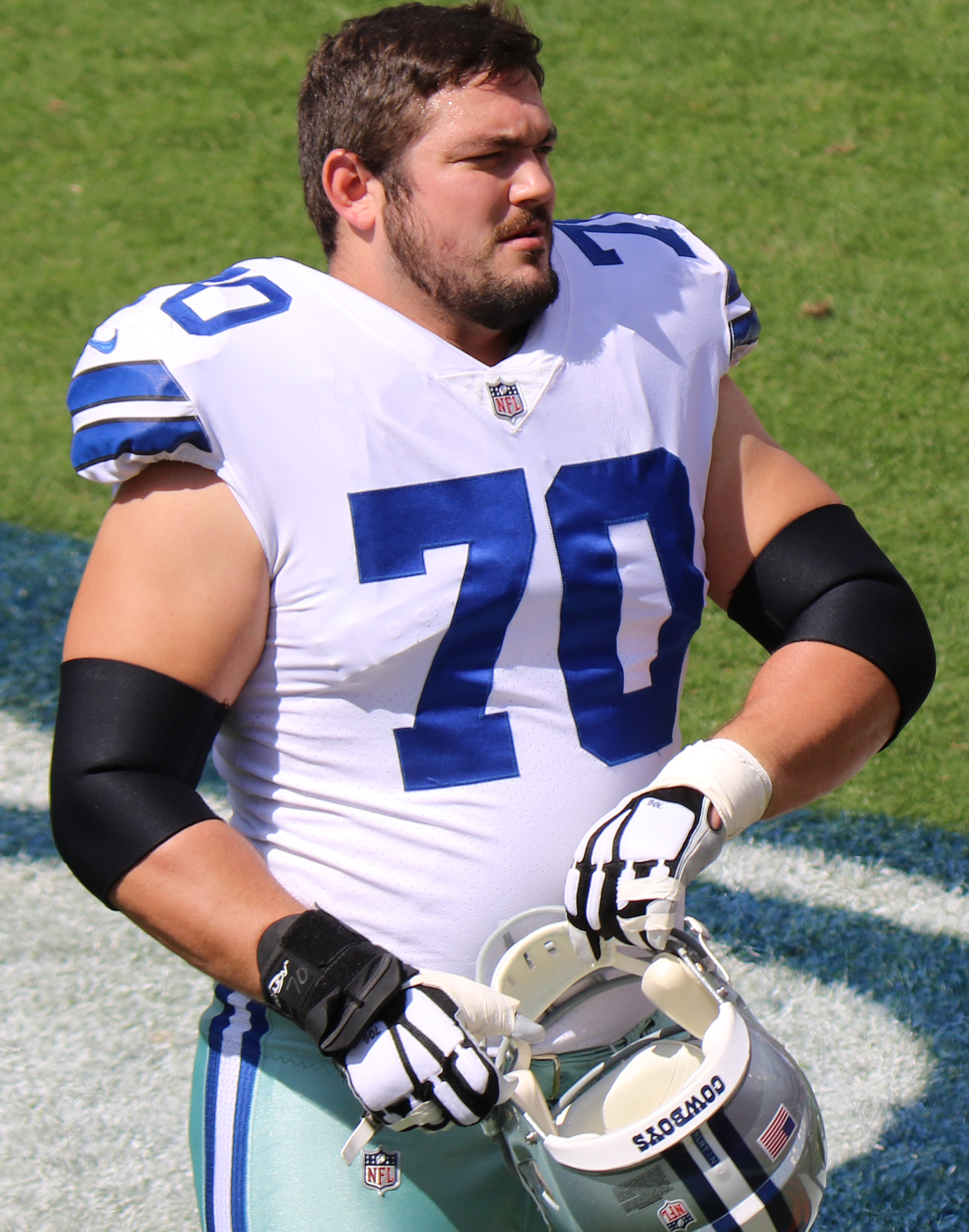
- Martin with the Dallas Cowboys in 2017

No. 70
- Position: Guard

Personal information
- Born: November 20, 1990 (age 35); Indianapolis, Indiana, U.S.
- Listed height: 6 ft 4 in (1.93 m)
- Listed weight: 315 lb (143 kg)

Career information
- High school: Bishop Chatard (Indianapolis)
- College: Notre Dame (2009–2013)
- NFL draft: 2014: 1st round, 16th overall pick

Career history
- Dallas Cowboys (2014–2024)

Awards and highlights
- 7× First-team All-Pro (2014, 2016, 2018, 2019, 2021–2023); 2× Second-team All-Pro (2015, 2017); 9× Pro Bowl (2014–2019, 2021–2023); PFWA All-Rookie Team (2014); NFL 2010s All-Decade Team; Built Ford Tough Offensive Line of the Year (2016); Second-team All-American (2012); 2013 Pinstripe Bowl MVP

Career NFL statistics
- Games played: 162
- Games started: 162
- Fumble recoveries: 3
- Stats at Pro Football Reference

Zachary Edward Martin (born November 20, 1990) is a former professional American football player who was a guard for 11 seasons in the National Football League (NFL), all for the Dallas Cowboys. He played college football for the Notre Dame Fighting Irish and was selected by the Cowboys in the first round of the 2014 NFL draft. Named to the NFL 2010s All-Decade Team, Martin made nine Pro Bowls and nine All-Pro teams. He is regarded as one of the greatest guards in NFL history.

== Early life ==
Martin and his brother Nick, spent their entire elementary years from kindergarten through eighth grade at Saint Matthew Catholic School, in Indianapolis, Indiana, according to their then principal, Dr. Martin Erlenbaugh. The Martins are products of Catholic Youth Organization (CYO) sports in the Archdiocese of Indianapolis. Zack and Nick each enrolled their freshman year at Bishop Chatard High School in Indianapolis, Indiana. Zack tallied 114 pancake blocks during his senior campaign, and was named a first-team all-state selection as a senior and junior. He was a member of the Indiana Class 3A State Championship team as a sophomore with a 12–3 record, and helped lead his high school team to a 14–1 record and second consecutive Indiana Class 3A state championship as a junior in 2007.

He started both ways as a sophomore on the offensive and defensive lines, and recorded 73 tackles, including five tackles for loss as a defensive tackle during his sophomore season in 2006. He also starred in basketball during his sophomore and junior years at Bishop Chatard. His style of play earned him the nickname "the Butcher", given to him by opposing fans. He was selected to play in the 2009 Under Armour All-America Game in Orlando, Florida. He also competed in track & field as a shot putter and discus thrower. He played for legendary coach Andrew Slome.

Considered a four-star recruit by Rivals.com, he was rated the 22nd best offensive tackle in the nation. He accepted a scholarship from Notre Dame over offers from Indiana, Kentucky, and Michigan.

== College career ==
After redshirting in 2009, he became the starting left tackle for the Irish in 2010. He saw action in all 13 games in 2010, and was one of 11 players to start all 13 games for the Irish that season. As a junior in 2011, he started all 13 games at left offensive tackle, and was part of a unit that only allowed 17 sacks during the season. He helped pave the way for a running game that averaged 4.8 yards a carry, the best by a Notre Dame team since 1996. In 2012, he was named one of four team captains for the Irish. He started all 13 games and helped lead the team to a 12–0 regular season record and a trip to the 2013 BCS National Championship Game against the Alabama Crimson Tide, but lost 42–14. He announced he would return to the Irish for the 2013 season.

In his final season, he was named team captain for the second time, becoming only the 18th player in school history to earn such an honor. Martin would start all 13 games, setting a new school record for career starts by an offensive lineman with 52. He was leader of a unit that allowed only 8 sacks, tied for second best in the FBS. He was named MVP of the 2013 Pinstripe Bowl after a 29–16 win over Rutgers, becoming the first offensive lineman since 1959 (Jay Huffman) to receive that distinction in a college bowl game.

== Professional career ==
Pre-draft measurables
Height	Weight	Arm length	Hand span	20-yard shuttle	Three-cone drill	Vertical jump	Broad jump	Bench press
6 ft 4 1/4 in (1.94 m)	308 lb (140 kg)	32 7/8 in (0.84 m)	9 1/2 in (0.24 m)	4.59 s	7.65 s	28.0 in (0.71 m)	8 ft 10 in (2.69 m)	29 reps
All values from NFL Combine

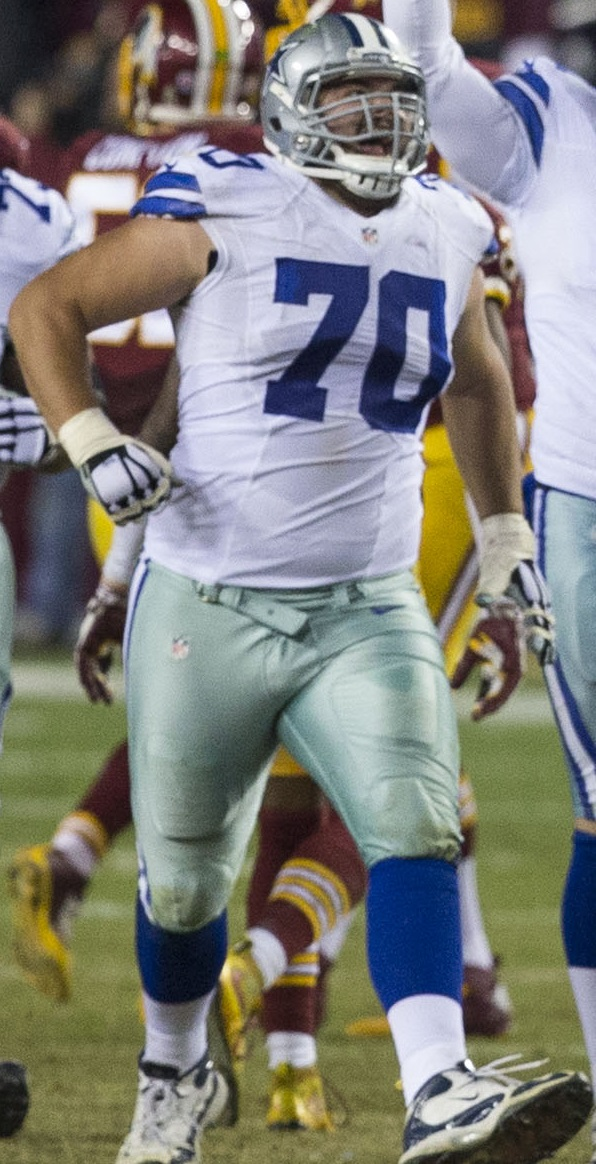
Martin with the Cowboys in 2015

In the 2014 NFL draft, there was speculation that the Dallas Cowboys would select quarterback Johnny Manziel if he was available. Instead, the team had targeted linebacker Ryan Shazier, who ended up going to the Pittsburgh Steelers. With the 16th pick of the first round, the Cowboys drafted Martin with the intention of converting him to an offensive guard. He was named the starter at right guard from the first day of organized team activities in the preseason, replacing Mackenzy Bernadeau, who had been the starter the previous two years. On December 23, Martin became one of four rookies selected to the 2014 Pro Bowl. He was named to the PFWA All-Rookie Team. On January 2, 2015, he was voted to the Associated Press (AP) 2014 All-Pro Team. This made him the only rookie picked for the team, and he became the first Cowboys rookie named to the team since running back Calvin Hill in 1969. He was also the first rookie offensive lineman to be named first-team AP All-Pro since Dick Huffman in 1947.

In 2015, Martin had a second All-Pro caliber season in as many years despite losing DeMarco Murray to the division rivals Philadelphia Eagles in free agency. Martin and company led the NFL's ninth best rushing attack as teammate Darren McFadden finished fourth in rushing with 1,089 yards. Martin played for Team Irvin along with each of his elected teammates in the 2016 Pro Bowl and was named second team All-Pro by the AP.

In 2016, Martin was named to his third straight Pro Bowl and was named First-team All-Pro, both honors being shared with fellow Cowboy offensive linemen Travis Frederick and Tyron Smith. He was also ranked 58th on the NFL Top 100 Players of 2017.

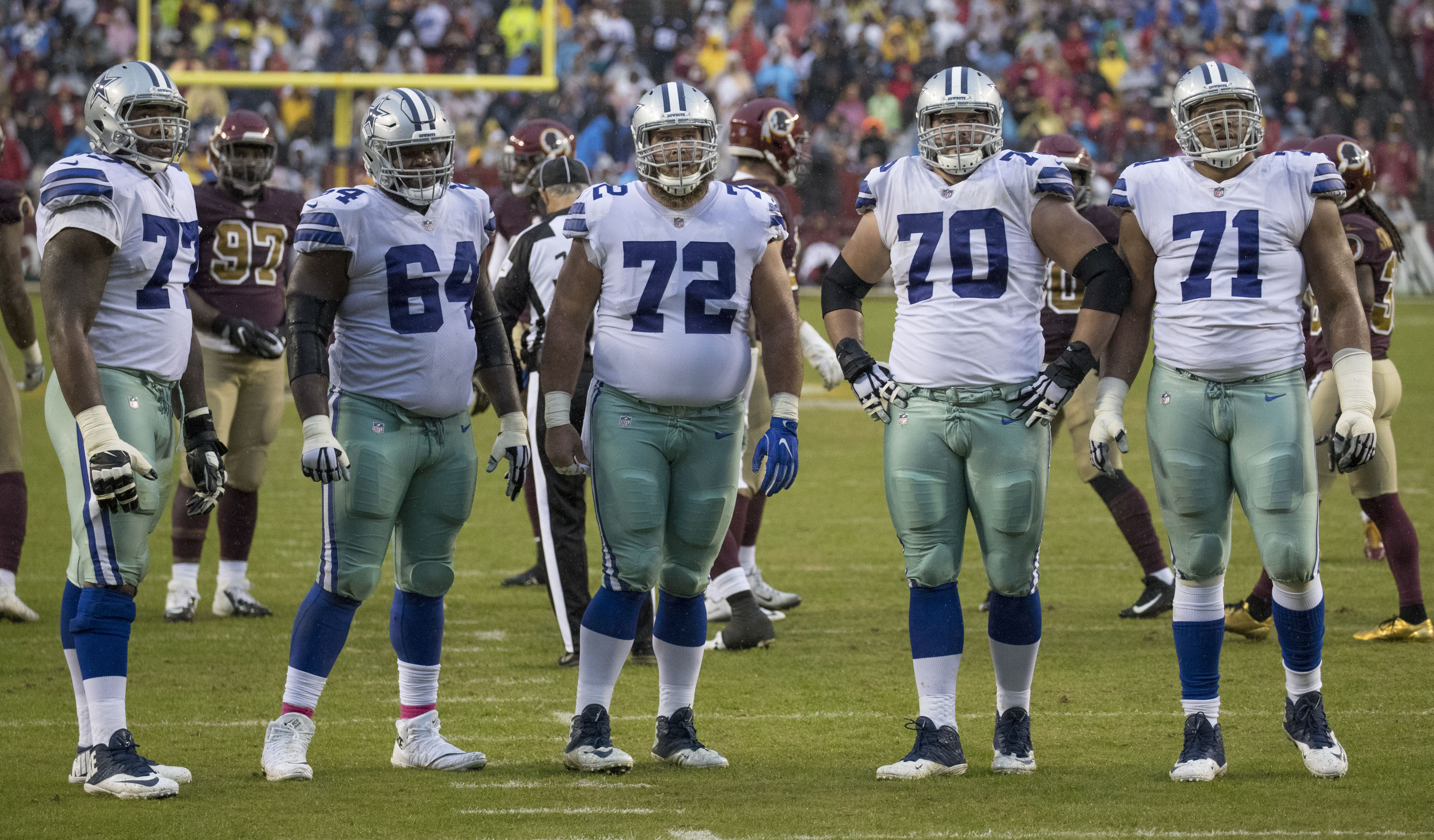
The Cowboys' offensive line in 2017

On April 18, 2017, the Cowboys picked up the fifth-year option on Martin's rookie contract. He was named to his fourth straight Pro Bowl alongside left tackle Smith and center Frederick for the fourth straight year. He was ranked 71st by his peers on the NFL Top 100 Players of 2018.

On June 13, 2018, Martin signed a six-year, $84 million contract extension with the Cowboys with $40 million guaranteed, making him the highest paid guard in the NFL. He suffered a knee injury in Week 14 and missed the following week, the first time in his career that he had missed a game.

In 2019, Martin became one of five offensive linemen ever to secure a Pro Bowl invitation in each of their first six seasons, joining Lou Creekmur (1950–57), Jon Morris (1964–70), Joe Thomas (2007–16) and Richmond Webb (1990–96).

In Week 11 of the 2020 season, Martin made his first career start at right tackle due to injuries across the offensive line. On December 7, 2020, Martin was placed on injured reserve with a calf strain. He was activated on January 2, 2021.

On September 5, 2021, it was announced that Martin was ruled out for the 2021 season opener due to testing positive for COVID-19.

Martin started all 17 games for the Cowboys in 2022, while playing for 1,143 offensive snaps, receiving one holding penalty and not allowing a single sack. For his efforts, in January 2023, Martin received a first-team All-Pro nod and a spot on the NFC roster in the Pro Bowl.

On September 14, 2023, during the Cowboys' victory over the New York Jets, Martin suffered an ankle injury. On September 24, he was ruled out for their game against the Arizona Cardinals.

Martin started 10 games for the Cowboys in 2024. On December 5, 2024, it was announced that Martin would undergo season–ending ankle surgery.

On February 20, 2025, Martin officially announced his retirement from football after 11 seasons with the Dallas Cowboys.

== Regular season statistics ==
Legend
**Bold**	Career high

Year	Team	Games		Offense					
Year	Team	GP	GS	Snaps	Pct	Holding	False start	Decl/Pen	Acpt/Pen
2014	DAL	16	16	1,054	99%	1	1	0	4
2015	DAL	16	16	1,029	**100%**	**3**	**3**	**3**	**8**
2016	DAL	16	16	1,058	**100%**	1	1	0	2
2017	DAL	16	16	1,018	96%	0	0	0	0
2018	DAL	14	14	877	94%	0	1	0	1
2019	DAL	16	16	1,115	**100%**	1	0	0	2
2020	DAL	10	10	618	83%	0	0	1	0
2021	DAL	16	16	1,103	96%	0	1	0	2
2022	DAL	17	17	**1,143**	98%	1	0	0	1
2023	DAL	15	15	908	88%	0	1	1	1
2024	DAL	10	10	639	92%	0	0	1	0
Career		162	162	10,562	-	7	8	6	21

== Personal life ==
Martin married his wife Morgan in July 2016 and has a son and a daughter. His wife is the sister of former NFL tight end Tyler Eifert. Before becoming brothers-in-law, Martin and Eifert were teammates and roommates at the University of Notre Dame. Martin's brother Nick is also an NFL center. He also played college football at Notre Dame and was selected by the Houston Texans in the second round of the 2016 NFL draft.
