= Nick Martin (center) =

American football player (born 1993)

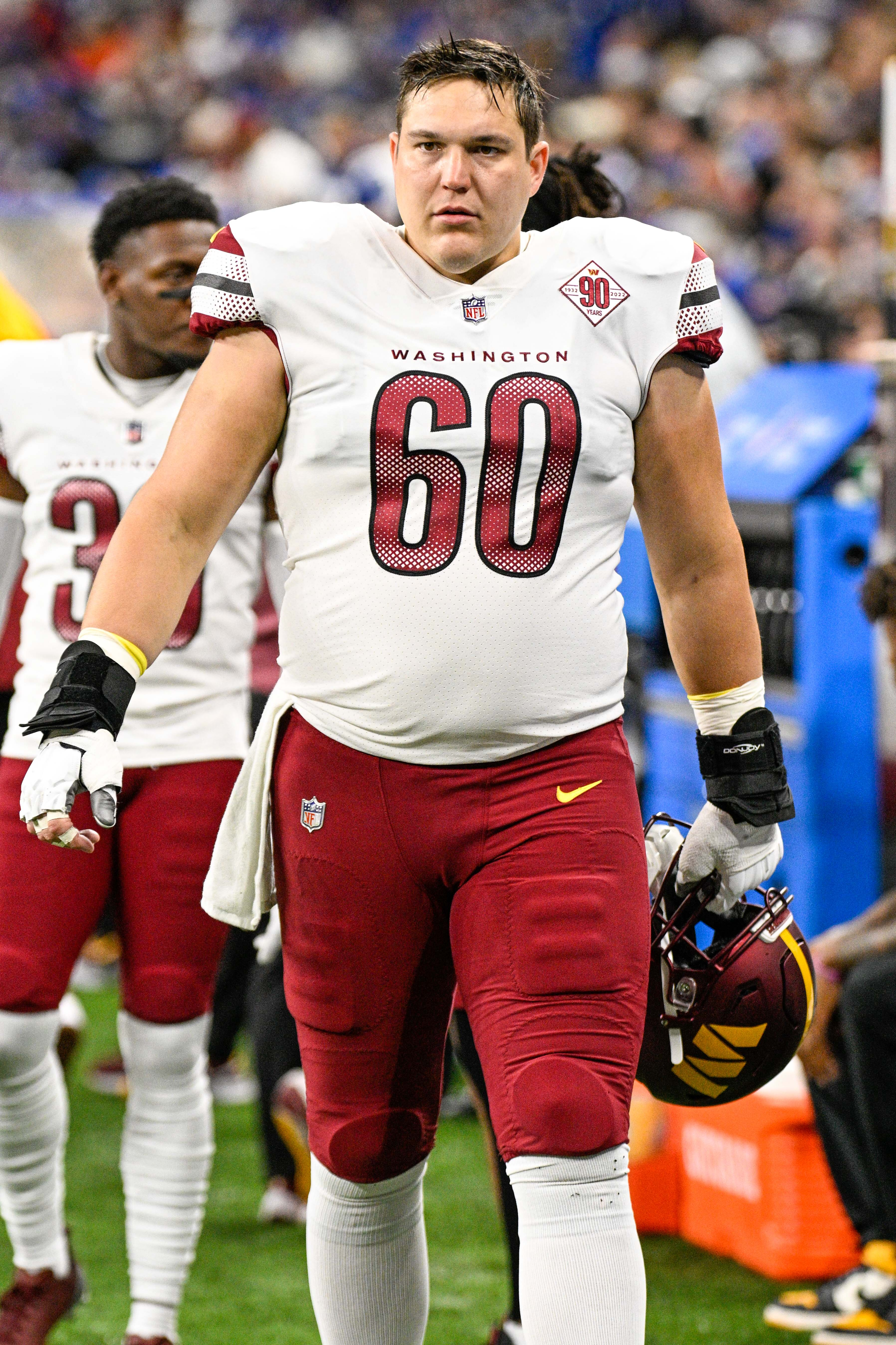
- Martin with the Washington Commanders in 2022

No. 60, 66
- Position: Center

Personal information
- Born: April 29, 1993 (age 33); Indianapolis, Indiana, U.S.
- Listed height: 6 ft 4 in (1.93 m)
- Listed weight: 295 lb (134 kg)

Career information
- High school: Bishop Chatard (Indianapolis)
- College: Notre Dame (2011–2015)
- NFL draft: 2016: 2nd round, 50th overall pick

Career history
- Houston Texans (2016–2020); Las Vegas Raiders (2021); New Orleans Saints (2022)*; Washington Commanders (2022)
- * Offseason or practice squad member only

Awards and highlights
- 3× first-team All-Independent (2013–2015)

Career NFL statistics
- Games played: 83
- Games started: 64
- Stats at Pro Football Reference

Nicholas Jacob Martin (born April 29, 1993) is an American former professional football player who was a center in the National Football League (NFL). He played college football for the Notre Dame Fighting Irish and was selected by the Houston Texans in the second round of the 2016 NFL draft. Martin was also a member of the Las Vegas Raiders, New Orleans Saints, and Washington Commanders.

== Early life ==
Martin and his brother, Zack, attended Saint Matthew Catholic grade school, Indianapolis, Indiana, from kindergarten through eighth grade. Both Martins were products of the Catholic Youth Organization (CYO) football program from third grade to eighth grade.

Martin attended Bishop Chatard High School in Indianapolis, Indiana. As a senior, he helped lead Bishop Chatard to the 2010 Indiana Class 3A state title. He was named a first-team Indiana all-state pick on the Associated Press Class 3A team as offensive lineman.

Considered a three-star recruit by Rivals.com, he was rated as the 68th-best offensive tackle prospect of his class. Originally committed to play college football for the Kentucky Wildcats, Martin switched his commitment to Notre Dame.

== College career ==
After his first two seasons as a reserve, Martin emerged as a starter in 2013, starting on the offensive line with his brother, Zack. Martin started 11 games, before sustaining a season-ending knee injury against BYU. Martin returned to form in 2014, and was a named a team captain. Martin started the first three games at center, before an injury to his snapping hand resulted in his move to offensive guard, where he started the remaining 10 games of the season. As a redshirt senior in 2015, Martin started all 13 games for the Irish, helping establish a running game that rushed for 207.6 yards per game, the highest since 1998.

== Professional career ==
Pre-draft measurables
Height	Weight	Arm length	Hand span	Wingspan	40-yard dash	10-yard split	20-yard split	20-yard shuttle	Three-cone drill	Vertical jump	Broad jump	Bench press
6 ft 4 1/8 in (1.93 m)	299 lb (136 kg)	32 1/2 in (0.83 m)	9 3/4 in (0.25 m)	6 ft 6 in (1.98 m)	5.22 s	1.86 s	3.02 s	4.72 s	7.57 s	28.0 in (0.71 m)	8 ft 1 in (2.46 m)	28 reps
All values from NFL Combine

=== Houston Texans ===
The Houston Texans selected Martin in the second round (50th overall) of the 2016 NFL Draft. On May 13, 2016, the Texans signed Martin to a four-year, $4.77 million rookie contract that includes $2.33 million guaranteed and a signing bonus of $1.67 million.

On August 25, 2016, he underwent ankle surgery and was ruled out for the entire 2016 season. On August 30, 2016, he was placed on injured reserve.

Martin started the first 14 games of the season at center for the Texans before suffering an ankle injury in Week 15. He was placed on injured reserve on December 19, 2017. On September 10, 2019, Martin signed a three-year, $33 million contract extension with $18.5 million guaranteed with the Texans. On February 26, 2021, Martin was released by the Texans.

=== Las Vegas Raiders ===
Martin signed with the Las Vegas Raiders on March 24, 2021. He was named the backup center to Andre James for the entire season.

=== New Orleans Saints ===
On July 26, 2022, Martin signed with the New Orleans Saints. He was released on August 30, and re-signed to the team's practice squad the next day. Martin was released by New Orleans on September 10.

=== Washington Commanders ===
Martin signed a one-year contract with the Washington Commanders on September 20, 2022. Following Wes Schweitzer being placed on injured reserve, Martin took over as the starting center in Week 4. Two weeks later, the Commanders relieved him of the starting role after activating Tyler Larsen off the PUP list. In the Week 13 game against the New York Giants, Martin subbed in for Larsen in the fourth quarter after the latter was carted off the field.

== Personal life ==
Nick's older brother, Zack, is a former Pro Bowl offensive guard who played for the Dallas Cowboys. Their father, Keith, played defensive tackle for Kentucky.
