= Tarean Folston =

American gridiron football player (born 1995)

No. 25, 26
- Position: Running back

Personal information
- Born: January 11, 1995 (age 31); Cocoa, Florida, U.S.
- Listed height: 5 ft 9 in (1.75 m)
- Listed weight: 214 lb (97 kg)

Career information
- High school: Cocoa (FL)
- College: Notre Dame
- NFL draft: 2017: undrafted

Career history
- Atlanta Legends (2019); Tampa Bay Vipers (2020); Edmonton Elks (2021)

Tarean Folston (born January 11, 1995) is an American former football running back. He most recently played for the Edmonton Elks of the Canadian Football League (CFL). He played college football for Notre Dame.

== Early life ==
Folston attended Cocoa High School in Cocoa, Florida, where he was an AP Florida Class 4A first-team all-state selection in 2012. He was also named the Florida Today offensive player of the year following his senior season, in which he rushed for 1,186 yards and 13 touchdowns helping advance Cocoa to the Florida state semifinals. He was selected to play in the 2013 Under Armour All-America Game in St. Petersburg, Florida.

Considered a consensus four-star recruit by Rivals.com, ESPN and Scout.com, he was rated as the 6th best running back prospect of his class. On January 2, 2013, he accepted a scholarship offer and committed to Notre Dame over offers from Florida State, Auburn and Oregon.

College recruiting
| Name | Hometown | School | Height | Weight | 40^{‡} | Commit date |
|---|---|---|---|---|---|---|
| Tarean Folston; RB | Cocoa, FL | Cocoa High School | 5 ft 10 in (1.78 m) | 190 lb (86 kg) | 4.50 | Jan 2, 2013 |
| Tarean Folston; RB | Recruit ratings: Scout: Rivals: (85) | | | | | |
Overall recruit ranking: Scout: 24 (RB), 6 (FL), 11 (regional) Rivals: 14 (RB), 119 (national) ESPN: 6 (RB), 66 (national)
Note: In many cases, Scout, Rivals, 247Sports, On3, and ESPN may conflict in their listings of height and weight.; In these cases, the average was taken. ESPN grades are on a 100-point scale.; Sources: "Notre Dame Football Commitment List". Rivals.; "Notre Dame College Football Recruiting Commits". Scout.; "ESPN". ESPN.; "Scout.com Team Recruiting Rankings". Scout.; "2013 Team Ranking". Rivals.com.

== College career ==
=== Freshman ===
Folston played a limited role in the first half of the season due to depth at the position and a hip flexor injury before having a breakout performance against Navy. He rushed for 140 yards on 18 carries, scoring a touchdown in the last few minutes of the game helping his team to victory. He finished the season with 470 rushing yards on 88 carries, ranking third on the team in both categories, but tied for the team high with three rushing TDs.

=== Sophomore ===
Folston entered the season in a three-man rotation at running back with senior Cam McDaniel and fellow sophomore Greg Bryant. Through the first five games of the season, Folston managed only 165 yards before breaking out for three touchdowns (two rushing, one receiving) and 169 total yards in a 50–43 victory over North Carolina. Following his performance, over the final seven games of the season, Folston earned the majority of the carries. He rushed for 100+ yards in four of the final seven games of the season; 120 against Florida State, 149 vs. Navy, 106 vs. Northwestern and 134 vs. Louisville, and concluded his season rushing for 73 yards and one touchdown against LSU in a 31–28 victory in the 2014 Music City Bowl. He finished his season with 889 rushing yards on 175 carries (5.1 avg) and six touchdowns, with 18 receptions for 190 yards and one touchdown receiving.

=== Junior ===
After his third carry of the season, against Texas, Folston left the game and did not return. The next day, Brian Kelly announced that Folston had torn his ACL and would miss the entire season.

=== Career statistics ===
| | | Rushing | | | | | Receiving | | | |
| Year | Team | Att | Yds | Avg | Lng | TD | Rec | Yds | Avg | TD |
|---|---|---|---|---|---|---|---|---|---|---|
| 2013 | Notre Dame | 88 | 470 | 5.3 | 43 | 3 | 5 | 35 | 7.0 | 0 |
| 2014 | Notre Dame | 175 | 889 | 5.1 | 26 | 6 | 18 | 190 | 10.6 | 1 |
| 2015 | Notre Dame | 3 | 19 | 6.3 | 15 | 0 | 0 | 0 | 0.0 | 0 |
| 2016 | Notre Dame | 77 | 334 | 4.3 | 54 | 2 | 8 | 66 | 8.3 | 0 |
| Career | | 343 | 1,712 | 5.0 | 54 | 11 | 31 | 291 | 9.4 | 1 |

== Professional career ==
Pre-draft measurables
| Height | Weight | Arm length | Hand span | 40-yard dash | 10-yard split | 20-yard split | 20-yard shuttle | Three-cone drill | Vertical jump | Broad jump | Bench press |
|---|---|---|---|---|---|---|---|---|---|---|---|
| 5 ft 9 1/4 in (1.76 m) | 199 lb (90 kg) | 30 3/8 in (0.77 m) | 9 1/2 in (0.24 m) | 4.76 s | 1.68 s | 2.75 s | 4.24 s | 6.93 s | 33.5 in (0.85 m) | 9 ft 7 in (2.92 m) | 20 reps |
All values from Pro Day

=== Atlanta Legends ===
In 2019, Folston joined the Atlanta Legends of the Alliance of American Football. The league ceased operations in April 2019.

=== Tampa Bay Vipers ===
Folston signed with the Tampa Bay Vipers of the XFL during training camp before its inaugural 2020 season. He was placed on injured reserve before the start of the season on January 21, 2020. He was waived from injured reserve on February 28, 2020. He was re-signed on March 6, 2020. He had his contract terminated when the league suspended operations on April 10, 2020.

=== Edmonton Elks ===
Folston was added to the active roster of the Edmonton Elks of the CFL on July 9, 2021.

== Personal life ==
His father, James, was a second round draft pick by the Oakland Raiders in the 1994 NFL draft and played eight seasons in the NFL. His younger brother, James Folston Jr., is a senior defensive end for the Pittsburgh Panthers. His sister, Jatana, is a Class of 2019 High School track and field athlete that recently signed an athletic scholarship with the University of Southern California USC.
