= Chris Watt =

American football player and coach (born 1990)

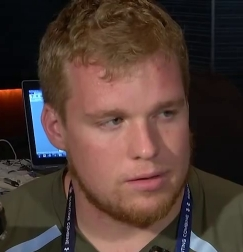
- Watt in 2014

Indianapolis Colts
- Title: Assistant offensive line coach

Personal information
- Born: August 17, 1990 (age 36); Glen Ellyn, Illinois U.S.
- Listed height: 6 ft 3 in (1.91 m)
- Listed weight: 310 lb (141 kg)

Career information
- Position: Offensive guard (No. 65)
- High school: Glenbard West (Glen Ellyn)
- College: Notre Dame (2009–2013)
- NFL draft: 2014: 3rd round, 89th overall pick

Career history

Playing
- San Diego Chargers (2014–2016); New Orleans Saints (2017)*
- * Offseason or practice squad member only

Coaching
- Notre Dame (2019–2020) Graduate assistant; Tulane (2021) Offensive line coach; Notre Dame (2022) Assistant offensive line coach; Indianapolis Colts (2023–present) Assistant offensive line coach

Career NFL statistics
- Games played: 31
- Games started: 23
- Stats at Pro Football Reference

Chris Watt (born August 17, 1990) is an American professional football coach and former player who is the assistant offensive line coach for the Indianapolis Colts of the National Football League (NFL). He played four seasons as an offensive guard in the NFL. He was selected by the San Diego Chargers in the third round, 89th overall, of the 2014 NFL draft. He played college football for the Notre Dame Fighting Irish.

== Early life ==
Watt was born on August 17, 1990, in Glen Ellyn, Illinois to parents Rich and Mary Pat. Watt attended Glenbard West High School in Glen Ellyn. Watt played three different offensive line positions on the football team. He was selected to the 2009 U.S. Army All-American Bowl in San Antonio, Texas. He was also named to USA Today All-American team and placed on the Parade All-America team following his senior year. He was named the top high school recruit in the midwest by the Detroit Free Press. He was also named to Tom Lemming's 26 man All-America team. He was selected first-team All-American by MaxPreps in 2008.

Considered a four-star recruit by Rivals.com, he was rated the second best offensive guard prospect in his class. He was named the 2008–09 Illinois Gatorade Player of the Year. The Sporting News named him fifth-best offensive lineman and 35th best overall. He was ranked the top overall offensive guard by Scout.com and rated as 68th best overall prospect in the SI.com/Takkle Tackle Top 200.

== College career ==
Watt redshirted as a freshman in 2009 so he did not play any games. Watt began to see some action in 2010 as a Sophomore when he played 13 games. He provided depth and backup for Chris Stewart at right guard. He was the Fighting Irish's starting left guard in 2011, 2012, and 2013. During his senior year at Notre Dame, he alongside his offensive line compatriots only allowed eight sacks. This is tied for the second-fewest in the U.S. He started all 13 games for the Irish in 2011. He played 47 straight games and started in 34 consecutive games before missing the Navy game due to an injured knee. He returned to start the final three games of the 2013 season, before being held out of the Pinstripe Bowl vs. Rutgers due to his previously injured knee. At the end of his senior year, he was the recipient of the Pietrosante Award, given to the best student-athlete who demonstrated courage, loyalty, teamwork, dedication, and pride that resembled the late Irish fullback.

== Professional career ==
Pre-draft measurables
Height	Weight	Arm length	Hand span	Wingspan	40-yard dash	10-yard split	20-yard split	20-yard shuttle	Three-cone drill	Vertical jump	Broad jump	Bench press
6 ft 2 5/8 in (1.90 m)	310 lb (141 kg)	32 3/4 in (0.83 m)	9 1/2 in (0.24 m)	6 ft 6 3/4 in (2.00 m)	5.50 s	1.91 s	3.08 s	4.76 s	7.67 s	28.5 in (0.72 m)	8 ft 8 in (2.64 m)	29 reps
All values from NFL Combine/Pro Day

=== San Diego Chargers ===
Watt was selected by the San Diego Chargers in the 3rd round of the 2014 NFL draft. Watt has played in 31 games in his professional career, and has started a total of 23.

=== New Orleans Saints ===
On June 19, 2017, Watt was signed by the New Orleans Saints. On July 26, 2017, he retired from the NFL.

== Coaching career ==
Watt spent the 2020 season as a graduate assistant at Notre Dame, where he worked with the offensive line. On March 4, 2021, it was announced that Watt had been hired as the offensive line coach for Tulane University.

== Personal life ==
Watt's great-great-uncle, Dan Hurley, and his grandfather, William, played football at Harvard University. His father, Richard (referred to by his friends as Watty), played football at Hillsdale College, and an uncle, Robert, played football at Brown University. Watt's brother, Kevin, played football at Northwestern and his sister, Katie, played soccer at Toledo.
