= Troy Niklas =

American football player (born 1992)

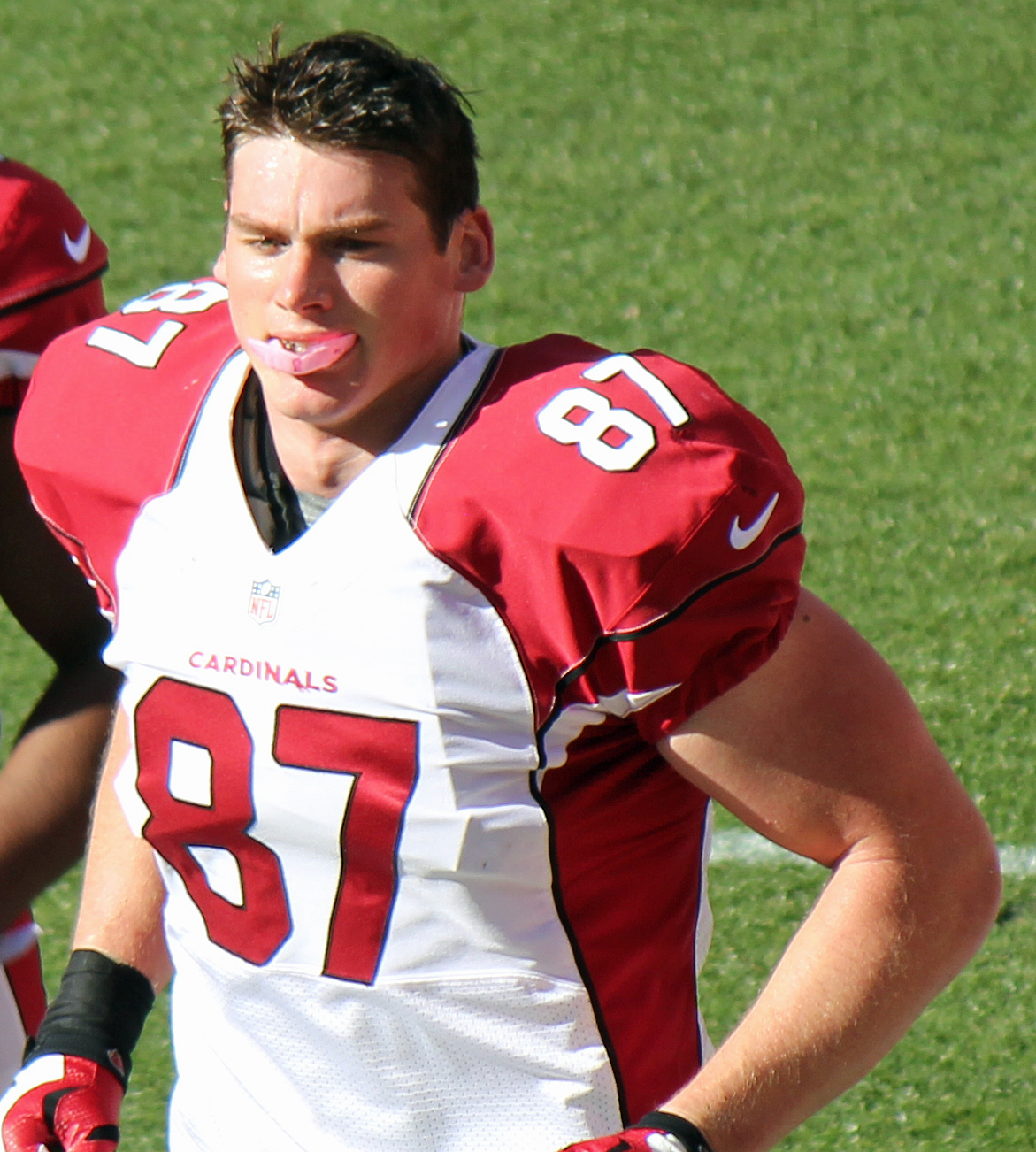
- Niklas with the Arizona Cardinals in 2014

No. 87
- Position: Tight end

Personal information
- Born: September 18, 1992 (age 34); Fullerton, California, U.S.
- Listed height: 6 ft 6 in (1.98 m)
- Listed weight: 270 lb (122 kg)

Career information
- High school: Servite (Anaheim, California)
- College: Notre Dame (2011–2013)
- NFL draft: 2014: 2nd round, 52nd overall pick

Career history
- Arizona Cardinals (2014–2017); New England Patriots (2018)*; Tampa Bay Buccaneers (2019)*
- * Offseason or practice squad member only

Career NFL statistics
- Receptions: 19
- Receiving yards: 203
- Receiving touchdowns: 3
- Stats at Pro Football Reference

Troy Niklas (born September 18, 1992) is an American former professional football player who was a tight end for four seasons in the National Football League (NFL), all with the Arizona Cardinals. He played college football for the Notre Dame Fighting Irish and was selected by the Cardinals in the second round of the 2014 NFL draft.

== Early life ==
Niklas attended Servite High School in Anaheim, California. He was a two-way standout as both an offensive and defensive lineman. He helped lead Servite to 14–1 record in 2010, a second straight CIF Southern Section Pac-5 Division title and runner-up in state playoffs. He was named the Los Angeles Times lineman of the year as a senior in 2010.

Also a standout athlete, Niklas was one of the state's top performers in the discus throw (top throw of 54.10 meters as a senior).

Considered a four-star recruit by Rivals.com, he was rated the 24th-best offensive tackle prospect in the nation. He accepted a scholarship from Notre Dame over offers from Stanford and USC.

== College career ==
Niklas attended the University of Notre Dame from 2011 to 2013. As a freshman, he played as a linebacker, appearing in 12 games with one start against the Michigan State Spartans. He was moved to tight end as a sophomore. Playing behind Tyler Eifert, he caught 5 passes for 75 yards and one touchdown. As a junior, he hauled in 32 receptions for 498 yards with five touchdowns.

On January 9, 2014, Niklas announced his intentions to forgo his remaining eligibility and enter the 2014 NFL draft.

== Professional career ==
Pre-draft measurables
Height	Weight	Arm length	Hand span	40-yard dash	20-yard shuttle	Three-cone drill	Vertical jump	Broad jump	Bench press
6 ft 6 in (1.98 m)	270 lb (122 kg)	34 1/8 in (0.87 m)	10 in (0.25 m)	4.84 s	4.55 s	7.57 s	32 in (0.81 m)	9 ft 4 in (2.84 m)	27 reps
All values from NFL Combine

=== Arizona Cardinals ===
Niklas was selected by the Arizona Cardinals in the second round (52nd overall) of the 2014 NFL draft. He was the fourth tight end selected in 2014.

Niklas progress as a rookie was slowed due to his inability to participate in organized team activities after recovering from a hernia surgery in February.

On September 27, 2016, Niklas was placed on injured reserve.

In 2017, Niklas played in 15 games with 11 starts, recording 11 catches for 132 yards and one touchdown.

=== New England Patriots ===
On April 4, 2018, Niklas signed with the New England Patriots. On July 27, Niklas was released by the team.

=== Tampa Bay Buccaneers ===
On July 24, 2019, Niklas signed with the Tampa Bay Buccaneers. On July 29, Niklas was waived/injured by the Buccaneers and placed on injured reserve. He was released on August 6.

== Personal life ==
Niklas' uncle, Bruce Matthews, played at USC, was ninth overall pick in 1983 NFL draft, earned Pro Bowl honors 14 times while playing with the Houston Oilers / Tennessee Oilers / Titans from 1983 to 2001 and was elected to the Pro Football Hall of Fame in 2007.
