= Dan Fox (American football) =

American football player (born 1991)

No. 97
- Position: Linebacker

Personal information
- Born: March 17, 1991 (age 35); Rocky River, Ohio, U.S.
- Listed height: 6 ft 3 in (1.91 m)
- Listed weight: 233 lb (106 kg)

Career information
- High school: St. Ignatius (Cleveland, Ohio)
- College: Notre Dame
- NFL draft: 2014: undrafted

Career history
- New York Giants (2014)

Career NFL statistics
- Games played: 2
- Stats at Pro Football Reference

Daniel Patrick Fox (born March 17, 1991) is an American former professional football player who was a linebacker in the National Football League (NFL). He played college football for the Notre Dame Fighting Irish. He was signed as an undrafted free agent by the New York Giants.

== Early life ==
Fox was rated the 13th-best outside linebacker by Rivals.com and 15th-best overall prospect in Ohio according to their postseason prospect state rankings, he also ranked as fourth-best outside linebacker and best in pass coverage according to OhioVarsity.com. Fox was named to Ohio All-Championship Team by Bill Greene and Dave Berk, who rank the best players in Ohio during championship weekend and was selected to Division I second-team all-state squad by Associated Press. Fox was named third-team Division I-II all state by OhioVarsity.com and ranked 76th-best player in Midwest by SuperPrep. He was a member of the St. Ignatius High School state championship football team in 2008, who finished the season ranked 2nd nationally by MaxPreps. Fox intercepted one pass in 2008 state title game, recorded 76 tackles as junior, including nine tackles for loss and three interceptions.

== College career ==
=== Sophomore Season (2010) ===
Played in all 13 games for the Irish, predominantly on special teams where he totaled 20 tackles, including nine solo stops, and was ranked fourth on the team with eight overall stops on special teams and tied for third with eight stops on kickoff returns. He made a first career appearance for the Irish against Purdue registered four solo stops in the victory at Boston College. He totaled 270 snaps on special teams, tied with Bennett Jackson and Steve Filer for the most of any Irish player, and totaled 55 snaps on defense.

=== Junior Season (2011) ===
Fox started all 13 games at inside linebacker where he notched 48 tackles, including two and a half for loss, tallied one sack, one forced fumble and one pass breakup on the season. He recorded at least three tackles in 11 games, including seven contests with four or more tackles.

=== Graduating Season (2013) ===
Fox played in all 13 games with 10 starts and led Notre Dame with 95 tackles on the year. He topped the squad with both his 44 solo tackles and 51 assisted tackles. During the season, he made five tackles for loss, including one sack, recovered a fumble, made two interceptions and broke up a pass; he also led the team in tackles in a game five times. Fox finished his Notre Dame career with 226 tackles.

== Professional career ==
On August 30, 2014, Fox was waived by the New York Giants, and the next day signed to the practice squad.

On September 16, 2014, he was added to the active roster.
