= Cam McDaniel =

American football player (born 1991)

No. 33, 27
- Position: Running back

Personal information
- Born: September 20, 1991 (age 35); Coppell, Texas, U.S.
- Listed height: 5 ft 10 in (1.78 m)
- Listed weight: 207 lb (94 kg)

Career information
- High school: Coppell
- College: Notre Dame (2011–2014)
- NFL draft: 2015: undrafted

Career history
- Montreal Alouettes (2016); Toronto Argonauts (2017)

Awards and highlights
- Grey Cup champion (2017)
- Stats at CFL.ca

Cam McDaniel (born September 20, 1991) is an American former professional football running back.

== Early life ==
McDaniel attended Coppell High School in Coppell, Texas. In 2009, McDaniel rushed for over 1,200 yards and 20 touchdowns, while also catching 57 passes for seven touchdowns. The next season, McDaniel ran for 1,906 yards and 32 touchdowns while recording 40 receptions for 492 yards and three touchdowns. He was eventually named second-team all-state running back by the Texas Associated Press Sports Editors Class 5A team, and The Dallas Morning News named him to the all-area team's second team. The Fort Worth Star-Telegram awarded him MVP of District 7-5A. With McDaniel, the Coppell Cowboys lost only total three games, and went undefeated in his senior year.

During his junior year of high school, McDaniel was offered scholarships by eight schools: Iowa, Iowa State, Colorado, Tulsa, Stanford, Texas Tech, Minnesota and Navy. In 2010, McDaniel was offered additional scholarships by Air Force, Cincinnati, Army and Louisiana Tech.

College recruiting
Name	Hometown	School	Height	Weight	40^{‡}	Commit date
Cam McDaniel; RB	Coppell, Texas	Coppell High School	5 ft 10 in (1.78 m)	207 lb (94 kg)	4.51	Nov 29, 2010
Cam McDaniel; RB	Recruit ratings: Scout: Rivals: ESPN: (77)					
Overall recruit ranking: Scout: 3 Rivals: 10
‡ Refers to 40-yard dash; Note: In many cases, Scout, Rivals, 247Sports, On3, and ESPN may conflict in their listings of height, weight and 40 time.; In these cases, the average was taken. ESPN grades are on a 100-point scale.; Sources: "Notre Dame 2011 Football Commitments". Rivals.; "2011 Notre Dame Commits". Scout.; "Notre Dame Fighting Irish". ESPN.; "Scout.com Team Recruiting Rankings". Scout.; "2011 Team Ranking". Rivals.com.

== College career ==
On November 30, 2010, McDaniel announced his commitment to Notre Dame. ESPN stated that McDaniel was expected to serve as a slot receiver. In his freshman year in 2011, McDaniel served as a backup running back and on special teams, recording nine yards on three rushing attempts, while returning two kickoffs for 24 yards. In 2012, McDaniel played both running back and cornerback, while also playing special teams. He scored his first touchdown on October 6 against Miami (FL); McDaniel also set a school record for most consecutive carries on a drive with nine. McDaniel ended the 2012 season with 125 yards rushing and a touchdown.

On October 19, 2013 against the USC Trojans, McDaniel ran for a career-high 92 yards. That same game, he lost his helmet during a run, and a photo taken of him with tousled hair and a "Zoolander-esque smirk" went viral as "Ridiculously Photogenic Football Player", creating an Internet meme. McDaniel ended the 2013 season with 705 rushing yards and three touchdowns.

In his senior year, McDaniel was named a team captain. He concluded the 2014 season with 278 rushing yards and four touchdowns.

=== College statistics ===
			Rushing					Receiving		
Year	Team	GP/GS	Att	Yards	Avg	Long	TDs	Rec	Yards	TDs
2011	Notre Dame	8/0	3	9	3.0	12	0	0	0	0
2012	Notre Dame	13/0	23	125	5.4	19	1	2	41	0
2013	Notre Dame	13/3	152	705	4.6	36	3	6	34	0
2014	Notre Dame		77	278	3.6	23	4	9	76	0

== Professional career ==
Pre-draft measurables
Height	Weight	40-yard dash	20-yard split	20-yard shuttle	Three-cone drill	Vertical jump	Broad jump	Bench press
5 ft 9 in (1.75 m)	185 lb (84 kg)	4.59 s	4.21 s	11.28 s	6.78 s	35 in (0.89 m)	9 ft 10 in (3.00 m)	17 reps
All values from Notre Dame's Pro Day

McDaniel was not invited to the NFL Scouting Combine, though he attended Notre Dame's Pro Day on March 31, 2015, one of eleven players to do so. McDaniel recorded a three-cone drill time of 6.78 seconds, faster than all running backs invited to the Combine, and would rank fifth among running backs in the last five Combines. He was not drafted by any team in the 2015 NFL draft, but was offered a tryout with the Dallas Cowboys.

McDaniel first latched on with the Montreal Alouettes of the Canadian Football League for whom he played one game with in 2016. On May 11, 2017, McDaniel signed with the Toronto Argonauts, and was active for 9 games. While McDaniel did not play, he was a part of the Argos team that won the 105th Grey Cup. Overall in his professional career, McDaniel played in 10 games, recording 8 rushes for 26 yards, in addition to catching 3 passes for 44 yards.

== Personal life ==
McDaniel married high school sweetheart Stephani Sterrett on May 17, 2014. McDaniel's father, Danny McDaniel, is the head football coach at Prosper High School, and with his wife Diane, are producers for AdvoCare. McDaniel's grandfather and great-grandfather were also head coaches at Prosper. He has two brothers, Gavin and TJ both of whom also play running back; Gavin was a member of the Washington Huskies and Azusa Pacific Cougars, while TJ played for the SMU Mustangs before transferring to Northern Arizona for his final year.
