= T. J. Jones =

Canadian-born American football player (born 1992)

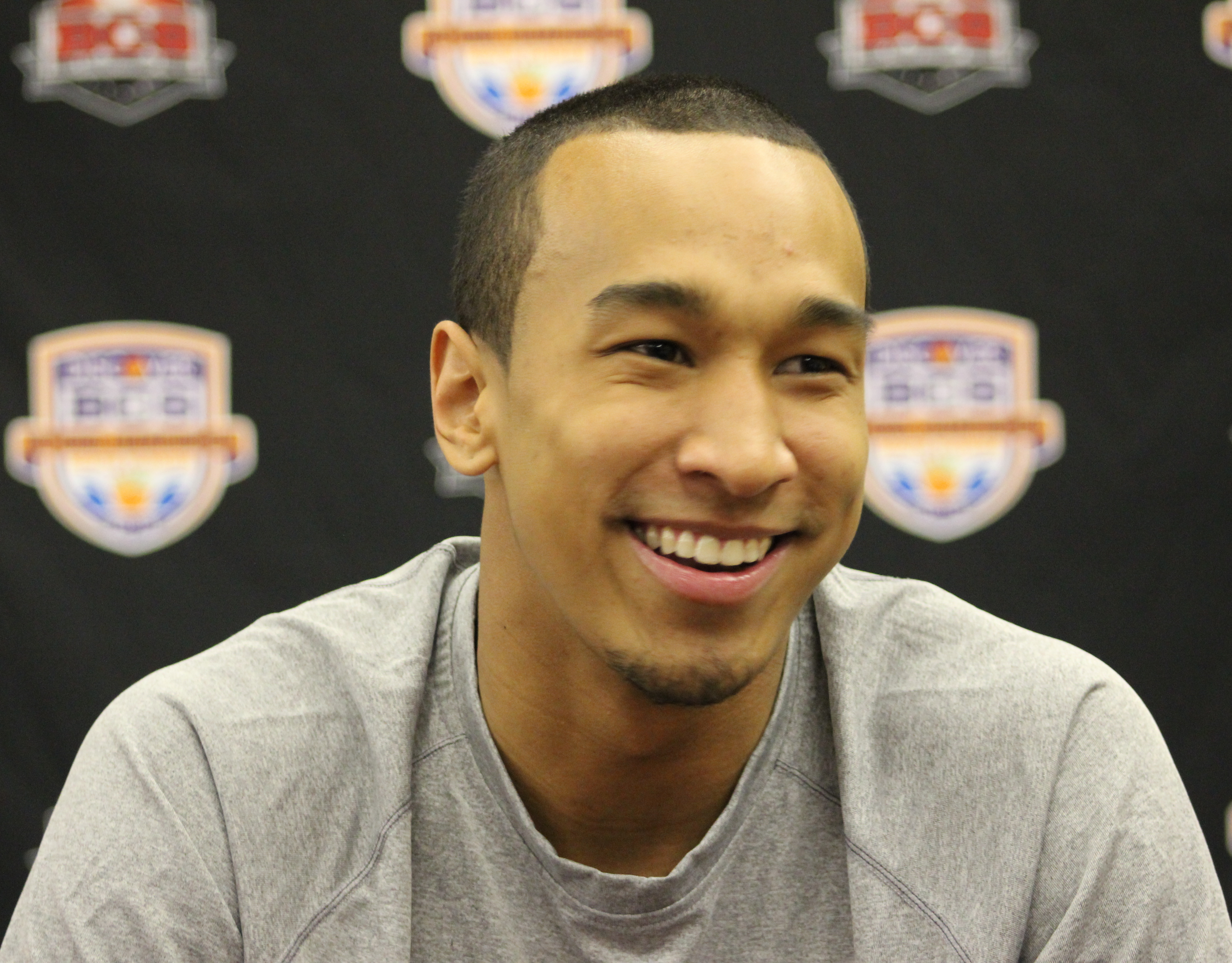
- Jones in 2013

No. 13, 80
- Position: Wide receiver

Personal information
- Born: July 19, 1992 (age 34); Winnipeg, Manitoba, Canada
- Listed height: 6 ft 0 in (1.83 m)
- Listed weight: 190 lb (86 kg)

Career information
- High school: Gainesville (Gainesville, Georgia)
- College: Notre Dame (2010–2013)
- NFL draft: 2014: 6th round, 189th overall pick

Career history
- Detroit Lions (2014–2018); New York Giants (2019)

Career NFL statistics
- Receptions: 67
- Receiving yards: 852
- Return yards: 581
- Total touchdowns: 5
- Stats at Pro Football Reference

Tai-ler "T. J." Fitzgerald Jones (born July 19, 1992) is an American-Canadian former professional football wide receiver. He was selected by the Detroit Lions in the sixth round of the 2014 NFL draft. He played college football at Notre Dame.

== Early life ==
Jones attended Gainesville High School in Gainesville, Georgia. He was named MaxPreps.com second-team All-American as senior in 2009. He finished his senior season with 76 receptions for 1,399 yards and 18 touchdowns, which earned him all-state honors, while helping Gainesville get to the Georgia state championship game for the first time since 1982. He caught 81 passes for 979 yards as junior in 2008.

Considered a four-star recruit by Rivals.com, he was rated as the 19th best wide receiver in the nation. After originally being committed to Stanford, he switched his commitment to Notre Dame.

== College career ==
Jones enrolled early at Notre Dame in January 2010. As a true freshman, he worked his way onto the field, playing in 12 games, starting 7, while catching 23 passes for 306 yards and three touchdowns. Jones became a full-time starter for the Irish in 2011. He played in all 13 games, starting every game but one, and recorded 38 receptions for 366 yards and three touchdowns. In 2012, Jones had his best season yet for the Fighting Irish, accumulating 50 receptions for 649 yards and 4 touchdowns. His year was highlighted by a game winning catch against Stanford in overtime and a berth to the 2013 BCS National Championship Game in Miami, Florida. In the National Championship game, Jones recorded 6 receptions for 90 yards in a 42–14 loss versus Alabama. In his senior season, he set career highs in receptions (70), receiving yards (1,108), and receiving touchdowns (9). He also rushed for 67 yards on nine carries (7.4 avg), scoring two touchdowns.

== Professional career ==
Pre-draft measurables
Height	Weight	Arm length	Hand span	40-yard dash	10-yard split	20-yard split	20-yard shuttle	Three-cone drill	Vertical jump	Broad jump
5 ft 11 5/8 in (1.82 m)	188 lb (85 kg)	30 5/8 in (0.78 m)	10 in (0.25 m)	4.48 s	1.54 s	2.59 s	4.27 s	6.82 s	33 in (0.84 m)	9 ft 11 in (3.02 m)
All values from NFL Combine

=== Detroit Lions ===
The Detroit Lions selected Jones in the sixth round (189th overall) of the 2014 NFL draft. Jones was the 24th wide receiver drafted in 2014.

On August 23, 2014, Jones was placed on the physically unable to perform list with a shoulder injury.

On September 3, 2016, Jones was waived by the Lions and was signed to the practice squad the next day. He was promoted to the active roster on December 3, 2016.

In 2017, Jones played in 14 games with six starts, recording a career-high 30 catches for 399 yards and one touchdown. He suffered a shoulder injury in Week 15 and was placed on injured reserve on December 19, 2017.

On April 9, 2018, the Lions re-signed Jones to a one-year contract.

=== New York Giants ===
On July 27, 2019, Jones signed with the New York Giants. He was waived on August 31, as the roster was reduced to the 53-man limit. Jones was re-signed by the Giants on September 11. He was released by New York on October 1.

=== Toronto Argonauts ===
On February 14, 2020, Jones and the Toronto Argonauts of the Canadian Football League (CFL) agreed to a contract with an annual salary of CA$200,000. However, the contract was not ratified by the CFL and CFLPA as the verbiage in the collective bargaining agreement (CBA) restricted rookie Canadian players to three-year contracts for at, or slightly above, the league minimum salary of CA$65,000 per season. As a result of the contract situation and the cancellation of the 2020 CFL season, Jones never officially signed with the Argonauts.

== Personal life ==
Jones was born in Winnipeg, Manitoba, Canada, where his father, Andre Jones, was a member starting defensive end of the Winnipeg Blue Bombers. Andre was best known for being a member of the 1988 Notre Dame Fighting Irish football team. Jones is part Korean.

Jones' godfather is Raghib "Rocket" Ismail, a former NFL and CFL wide receiver and former Notre Dame star. His younger brother, Malachi Jones, a former Appalachian State football player, played for the Montreal Alouettes of the Canadian Football League (CFL). He was named the 2018 Rookie & Receiver of the Year of the Arena Football League (AFL) as a member of the Albany Empire. His other younger brother, Jahmai Jones, who was drafted by the Los Angeles Angels as the 70th overall pick in the second round of the 2015 MLB draft and currently plays in Major League Baseball for the Detroit Tigers.

Jones and his wife, MTV's The Challenge star Theresa Jones, have a daughter born in 2015, a son born in 2019, and in January 2021 that they were expecting their third child, a girl.
