= Kyle Brindza =

American football player (born 1993)

No. 2
- Position: Placekicker

Personal information
- Born: January 13, 1993 (age 33); Valparaiso, Indiana, U.S.
- Listed height: 6 ft 0 in (1.83 m)
- Listed weight: 239 lb (108 kg)

Career information
- High school: Plymouth (Canton Township, Michigan)
- College: Notre Dame
- NFL draft: 2015: undrafted

Career history
- Detroit Lions (2015)*; Tampa Bay Buccaneers (2015); New York Jets (2016)*
- * Offseason or practice squad member only

Career NFL statistics
- Field goals made: 6
- Field goals attempted: 12
- Field goal %: 50%
- Longest field goal: 58
- Stats at Pro Football Reference

Kyle Brindza (born January 13, 1993) is an American former professional football player who was a placekicker in the National Football League (NFL). He played college football for the Notre Dame Fighting Irish. He signed as an undrafted free agent with the Detroit Lions in 2015 and was traded to the Tampa Bay Buccaneers, where he played for one season.

== Early life ==
Brindza was born with a club right foot, forcing him to undergo surgeries throughout his childhood. Despite his birth defect, he was a soccer goalie as a child, for which he wore a plastic brace. At Plymouth High School in Canton, Michigan, he started playing football, along with competing on the track and field team in discus and shot put.

== College career ==
Brindza began attending the University of Notre Dame in 2011 and was limited to being their kickoff specialist as a freshman. Throughout the season he kicked off 71 times for an average of 65.3 yards and 12 touchbacks while playing in 13 contests.

He would return to the same role for the Fighting Irish in 2012. On September 8, 2012, Notre Dame placekicker, Nick Tausch, would suffer an injury during a game against Purdue. Brindza would come in to replace Tausch but would miss his first career attempt. After missing his first field goal, Brindza then redeemed himself connecting on a 30-yard field goal and a 27-yard field goal with 7 seconds left. The 27-yard field goal sealed the 20–17 victory over the Purdue Boilermakers.

== Professional career ==
=== Detroit Lions ===
After going undrafted in the 2015 NFL draft, Brindza signed with the Detroit Lions on May 9, 2015.

=== Tampa Bay Buccaneers ===
Brindza was traded to the Tampa Bay Buccaneers for tight end Tim Wright on August 31, 2015. He was officially named to the Bucs' roster after the final roster cut to 53 players. Brindza made the team over veterans Connor Barth and Patrick Murray.

On September 27, 2015, in a Week 3 contest against the Houston Texans, Brindza missed 3 field goal attempts and an extra point in a 19–9 loss. However, he made a career long 58-yard field goal in the same game. The next week he would miss 2 field goal attempts and another extra point in a crucial 37–23 loss against the Carolina Panthers.

On October 5, 2015, the Buccaneers announced that they had decided to officially release Brindza after only making 6/12 field goal attempts and 6/9 PATs in his first four career games.

=== New York Jets ===
On February 5, 2016, Brindza signed a futures contract with the New York Jets. However, a week after signing with the Jets, he tore his right Achilles tendon during a routine workout. On February 18, 2016, Brindza was cut by the team.
