= List of Grand Valley State Lakers in the NFL draft =

This is a list of Grand Valley State Lakers football players in the NFL draft.

== Key ==
| B | Back | K | Kicker | NT | Nose tackle |
| C | Center | LB | Linebacker | FB | Fullback |
| DB | Defensive back | P | Punter | HB | Halfback |
| DE | Defensive end | QB | Quarterback | WR | Wide receiver |
| DT | Defensive tackle | RB | Running back | G | Guard |
| E | End | T | Offensive tackle | TE | Tight end |

== Selections ==
| Year | Round | Pick | Overall | Player | Team | Position |
|---|---|---|---|---|---|---|
| 1980 | 10 | 16 | 265 | Ron Essink | Seattle Seahawks | T |
| 1982 | 11 | 3 | 282 | Steve Michuta | Cleveland Browns | QB |
| 1982 | 12 | 20 | 326 | Rob Rubick | Detroit Lions | TE |
| 2003 | 6 | 2 | 175 | David Kircus | Detroit Lions | WR |
| 2005 | 7 | 33 | 247 | Keyonta Marshall | Philadelphia Eagles | DT |
| 2008 | 5 | 5 | 140 | Brandon Carr | Kansas City Chiefs | DB |
| 2013 | 7 | 10 | 216 | Charles Johnson | Green Bay Packers | WR |
| 2016 | 5 | 7 | 146 | Matthew Judon | Baltimore Ravens | DE |

== Notable undrafted players ==
Note: No drafts held before 1920

| Debut year | Player name | Position | Debut NFL/AFL team | Notes |
|---|---|---|---|---|
| 1983 | Jeff Chadwick | WR | Detroit Lions | |
| 1987 | Rick Johnson | OT | Detroit Lions | |
| 1989 | Frank Miotke | WR | New York Giants | |
| 1992 | Eric Lynch | RB | Detroit Lions | |
| 1995 | Mike Sheldon | OL | Buffalo Bills | |
| 2007 | Cullen Finnerty | QB | Baltimore Ravens | |
| 2007 | Eric Fowler | WR | Pittsburgh Steelers | |
| 2007 | Derrick Jones | DE | Pittsburgh Steelers | |
| 2008 | Brandon Barnes | OL | Baltimore Ravens | |
| 2009 | Dan Skuta | LB | Cincinnati Bengals | |
| 2010 | Todd Carter | PK | Carolina Panthers | |
| 2010 | Nick McDonald | C | Green Bay Packers | |
| 2011 | Cameron Bradfield | OT | Jacksonville Jaguars | |
| 2013 | Tim Lelito | OG | New Orleans Saints | |
| 2018 | Nick Keizer | TE | Baltimore Ravens | |
| 2025 | Ian Kennelly | S | Detroit Lions | |
