= Cullen Finnerty =

American football player (1982–2013)

No. 8
- Position: Quarterback

Personal information
- Born: August 18, 1982; Brighton, Michigan, U.S.
- Died: May 27, 2013 (aged 30); Lake County, Michigan, U.S.
- Listed height: 6 ft 3 in (1.91 m)
- Listed weight: 235 lb (107 kg)

Career information
- High school: Brighton
- College: Grand Valley State
- NFL draft: 2007: undrafted

Career history
- Baltimore Ravens (2007); Denver Broncos (2008)*; Cineplexx Blue Devils (2008); Muskegon Thunder (2009)
- * Offseason or practice squad member only

Awards and highlights
- 3× NCAA Division II national champion (2003, 2005, 2006)

Cullen Finnerty (August 18, 1982 – May 27, 2013) was an American football quarterback. He played college football at Grand Valley State, leading the Grand Valley Lakers to NCAA Division II Football Championships in 2003, 2005, and 2006. He was signed by the Baltimore Ravens as an undrafted free agent in 2007.

Finnerty was found dead on May 28, 2013, in Lake County, Michigan.

== Early life ==
Finnerty was born in Brighton, Michigan, and prepped at Brighton High School, located in Livingston County. He was awarded the Livingston County Football Player of the Year award as a senior, and was named to the Ann Arbor News All-Area First-team, and Michigan All-State Honorable Mention. Finnerty threw for 1,954 yards and rushed for 636 yards. As a junior, he was named the Ann Arbor News Player of the Year, as well as all-area, all-league and all-Livingston county. Finnerty threw for 459 yards and kicked three field goals in his first playoff game as a junior. Finnerty also lettered in track & field and baseball.

=== High school accolades ===
- Livingston County Player of the Year (Senior year)
- Ann Arbor News All-Area First-team
- Ann Arbor News Player of the Year (Junior year)
- Honorable mention all-state
- All-area, all-league and all-county (Junior year)

== College career ==
=== Toledo ===
In 2001, Cullen Finnerty redshirted his true freshman year at the University of Toledo.

=== Grand Valley State ===
Finnerty transferred to Grand Valley State University in 2002, but he did not play that season. In 2003, he joined the Grand Valley Football team for his first year of eligibility as a freshman.

==== Freshman season ====
Finnerty was awarded 2003 GLIAC conference Freshman of the Year award, and was named GVSU's Rookie of the Year. He was a two-time GLIAC Player of the Week, and was named Football.com Div II Player of the Week. Finnerty earned his first varsity letter as a freshman after starting 14 games. He completed 230-of-363 passes for 2,764 yards and 22 touchdowns, completing 63.4% of his passes. Finnerty was ranked 12th in pass efficiency rating (144.02) and 26th in total offense (256.9) in NCAA Div. II. He rushed for 822 yards and nine touchdowns himself, and also caught one pass as a receiver, for nine yards. Finnerty completed 20 or more passes in a game three times in the season, and broke the 200-yard passing mark six times, including two games of over 300 yards. He completed 19-of-29 passes for 149 yards and rushed for 78 yards on 19 carries in the NCAA Div II National Championship game vs. North Dakota.

==== Sophomore season ====
In his sophomore year, Finnerty started all 11 games at quarterback. He completed 192-of-333 passes for 2,462 yards and 25 touchdowns, averaging 189.4 yards passing per game. He rushed for 458 yards and five touchdowns on 139 carries. Finnerty tallied 224.6 yards of total offense (passing and rushing) per game. He was ranked 26th in the nation in passing efficiency (138.5), and 42nd in NCAA Division II in total offense per game at 225.4. He was fourth in the GLIAC in both passing yards (189.4) and total offense (225.4) per game.

==== Junior season ====
With GVSU winning the NCAA Division II National Championship, as a junior Finnerty was named the 2005 GLIAC Offensive Back of the Year, and First-team All-GLIAC Quarterback. Finnerty was given Honorable Mention on Don Hansen's Football Gazette All-American Team. Finnerty completed 157-of-273 passes for 2,459 yards and 22 touchdowns, while rushing for 523 yards and nine touchdowns himself on the season. In the National Championship match versus Northwest Missouri State University, Finnerty completed 12-of-19 passes for 172 yards and one touchdown, while rushing himself for 59 yards and two touchdowns on 14 carries in the win.

Through his first 3 seasons, Finnerty recorded a 36–4 record as a starting QB, and produced a 9–1 NCAA Div. II playoff record. He achieved 9,488 offensive yards and 92 career touchdowns, passing for 7,685 yards and 69 touchdowns, while rushing for 1,803 yards and 23 touchdowns. Finnerty ranked second in career total offense at GVSU with 9,488 yards, and third in career passing yards with 7,685 yards, and all with another season yet to play.

==== Senior season ====
As a senior quarterback, Finnerty became the winningest quarterback in NCAA history for all divisions, with a career record as a starting quarterback of 51–4, and he was named to the 2006 American Football Coaches Association All America Team. Finnerty also earned Daktronics First-team All American honors. He finished the 2006 GVSU season with a 15–0 record, completing 195 of 343 passes for 3,220 passing yards and 41 touchdowns, and leading the nation in quarterback efficiency with 169.32. Finnerty also rushed for 580 yards and 8 touchdowns himself, totalling 3,800 offensive yards and 49 touchdowns on the season, for an average offense of 253.3 yards per game . Finnerty was awarded second place for the Harlon Hill Trophy award, just prior to the NCAA Div II national championship match in Florence, Alabama. In the title match versus Northwest Missouri State University, Finnerty completed 15-of-33 passes for 225 yards and rushed for 115 yards on 22 carries for 340 yards of total offense, passing for one touchdown and running for another. Finnerty became the first quarterback in NCAA Division II Championship game history to pass for over 200 yards and also rush for over 100.

=== Statistics ===
Season	Team	Games (Note: Although Finnerty is commonly listed as having a 51–4 record as a starting quarterback, that total includes two wins from games in 2003 in which he came off the bench (vs. UC Davis and Indianapolis) and one game he did not play (vs. Mercyhurst), making his true record 11–1 as a freshman starter and 49–4 overall.)			Passing								Rushing			
Season	Team	GP	GS	Record	Cmp	Att	Pct	Yds	Y/A	TD	Int	Rtg	Att	Yds	Avg	TD
2001	Toledo	0	0	—	Redshirted (redshirt)											
2002	Grand Valley State	0	0	—	DNP											
2003	Grand Valley State	14	12	11–1	230	363	63.4	2,764	7.6	22	6	144.0	165	822	5.0	9
2004	Grand Valley State	13	13	10–3	192	333	57.7	2,462	7.4	25	10	138.5	139	458	3.3	5
2005	Grand Valley State	13	13	13–0	157	273	57.5	2,459	9.0	22	5	156.1	129	523	4.1	9
2006	Grand Valley State	15	15	15–0	195	343	56.9	3,220	9.4	41	10	169.3	132	580	4.4	8
Career		55	53	49−4	774	1,312	59.0	10,905	8.3	110	31	151.8	565	2,383	4.2	31

==== Awards and honors ====
- 51–4 career record as a starting quarterback—the winningest quarterback in college football history, regardless of NCAA Division
- 2003 GLIAC Freshman of the Year
- 2003 GVSU Rookie of the Year
- GLIAC Offensive Player of the Week 2003(2 times)
- D2Football.com Player of the Week 2003
- 2005 GLIAC Offensive Back of the Year
- GLIAC Offensive Player of the Week 2006 (2 times)
- 2006 GLIAC Player of the Year
- 2006 American Football Coaches Association Division II Coaches' All-America Team
- 2006 Daktronics First-team All American
- Finalist, 2006 Harlon Hill Trophy – 2nd place
- D2Football.com Player of the Decade (2000–2009)

== Professional career ==
=== Baltimore Ravens ===
After going undrafted in the 2007 NFL draft, Finnerty was signed by the Baltimore Ravens as an undrafted free agent. However, he was released by the team in July before the preseason.

Finnerty was re-signed to the practice squad during the season, and was promoted to the active roster for the final two games of the season after an injury to Kyle Boller.

An exclusive-rights free agent in the 2008 offseason, Finnerty was not tendered a contract by the Ravens.

=== Denver Broncos ===
On March 27, 2008, Finnerty was signed by the Denver Broncos.

On June 13, 2008, Finnerty was placed on waivers by the Broncos.

=== Cineplexx Blue Devils ===
In October 2008, Finnerty joined the Cineplexx Blue Devils of Austria. The Blue Devils play in the Austrian Football League second highest level currently.

Finnerty led the team to win the Bodensee Cup tournament. He threw three touchdown passes, ran for a touchdown, and kicked a 26-yard field goal in a 31–13 win over the Swiss national team in the Bodensee Cup title game.

Finnerty was named MVP of the tournament.

=== Muskegon Thunder ===
Finnerty was the starting quarterback of the Muskegon Thunder of the CIFL. In 2009 in two games, he had 123 passing yards, 2 passing touchdowns to go along with a completion percentage of 46.9 for the 2009 Indoor Football League season.

== Personal life ==
Cullen Finnerty's parents Tim and Maureen Finnerty live in Brighton, Michigan. Cullen and his wife Jennifer lived in Michigan with their two small children.

== Disappearance and death ==
On May 26, 2013, Finnerty was reported missing after he went fishing on the Baldwin River in Michigan.

On the evening of May 28, Finnerty was found dead in the woods by local search crews one mile from his fishing boat in Lake County, Michigan. His body had no signs of trauma and was dressed for the elements. An autopsy, released in August 2013, showed Finnerty died of pneumonia brought on by inhalation of vomit after he became disoriented. It has been suggested that this was related to chronic traumatic encephalopathy. Finnerty was one of at least 345 NFL players to be diagnosed after death with this disease, which is caused by repeated hits to the head.

The New York Times ran an article about his life and death in June 2013.

== See also ==
- List of solved missing person cases (2010s)
