= Brian Kelly (American football coach) =

American football coach (born 1961)

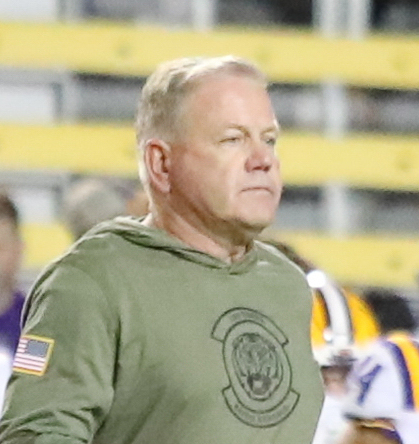
- Kelly in 2023

Biographical details
- Born: October 25, 1961 (age 65); Everett, Massachusetts, U.S.
- Education: Assumption University (1983)

Playing career
- 1979–1982: Assumption (club)
- Position: Linebacker

Coaching career (HC unless noted)

Football
- 1983–1986: Assumption (DC/LB)
- 1987–1988: Grand Valley State (GA/DB)
- 1989–1990: Grand Valley State (DC/RC)
- 1991–2003: Grand Valley State
- 2004–2006: Central Michigan
- 2006–2009: Cincinnati
- 2010–2021: Notre Dame
- 2022–2025: LSU

Softball
- 1984–1987: Assumption

Head coaching record
- Overall: 297–109–2 (Note: On November 22, 2016, Notre Dame was forced to vacate all 12 wins and its appearance in the 2013 BCS National Championship Game from the 2012 season, and all nine wins from the 2013 season, including its victory in the Pinstripe Bowl.)
- Bowls: 9–5
- Tournaments: 11–4 (NCAA D-II playoffs); 0–2 (CFP)

Accomplishments and honors

Championships
- 2 NCAA Division II (2002–2003); 3 MIFC (1992, 1997–1998); 3 GLIAC (2001–2003); 1 MAC (2006); 2 Big East (2008–2009); 1 SEC West Division (2022)

Awards
- 2× AFCA Division II Coach of the Year (2002–2003); 2× AP College Football Coach of the Year (2012, 2018); Eddie Robinson Coach of the Year (2012); 3× Home Depot Coach of the Year Award (2009, 2012, 2018); SN Coach of the Year (2012); Walter Camp Coach of the Year (2012); Bobby Dodd Coach of the Year Award (2018); GLIAC Coach of the Year (2001); 3× Big East Coach of the Year (2007–2009); ACC Coach of the Year (2020)

Brian Keith Kelly (born October 25, 1961) is a former American college football coach. He served as the head football coach at Grand Valley State University from 1991 to 2003, Central Michigan University from 2004 to 2006, the University of Cincinnati from 2006 to 2009, the University of Notre Dame from 2010 to 2021 and Louisiana State University (LSU) from 2022 to 2025. He led the Grand Valley State Lakers to consecutive NCAA Division II Football Championships in 2002 and 2003. Kelly's 2012 Notre Dame team reached the 2013 BCS National Championship Game, while his 2018 and 2020 Fighting Irish teams made appearances in the College Football Playoff.

== Early life ==
Kelly was born in Everett, Massachusetts and raised in a Catholic Irish-American family in Chelsea, Massachusetts. He attended St. John's Preparatory School in Danvers, Massachusetts. His father was a Boston politician. He was a four-year club football player at Assumption University as a linebacker. After graduating from Assumption in 1983 with a bachelor's degree in political science, he served as linebackers coach, defensive coordinator and softball coach from 1983 to 1986.

== Coaching career ==
=== Grand Valley State ===
Kelly joined the Grand Valley State University staff in 1987 as a graduate assistant and defensive backs coach for Tom Beck and became the defensive coordinator and recruiting coordinator in 1989. Kelly took over as head coach in 1991. In his final three seasons the Lakers went 41–2, at one point winning 32 consecutive games. The Lakers went 14–0 in 2002 en route to their first national title and went 14–1 in 2003 when they claimed their second national championship. Kelly was named the AFCA Division II Coach of the Year after each of these championship years.

In his 13 years as head coach at Grand Valley State, the Lakers won five conference titles and made six Division II Playoff appearances.

The 2001 Grand Valley team set 77 NCAA, GLIAC, and school records, including the all-time Division II scoring record, averaging 58.4 points per game.

Kelly's record in 13 years at Grand Valley State was 118–35–2.

=== Central Michigan ===
Kelly became the 24th head coach at Central Michigan University after the departure of Mike DeBord following the 2003 season.

==== 2004 season ====
Kelly inherited a team with limited success. Central Michigan had won more than three games only once in the previous four seasons. CMU finished with a 4–7 record in 2004.

==== 2005 season ====
In Kelly's second year at Central Michigan, he coached the team to a 6–5 record—the first winning season in seven years for the Chippewas.

==== 2006 season ====
In his third season, the Chippewas posted a 9–4 record under Kelly en route to winning the MAC Championship over Ohio and qualifying for the Motor City Bowl. At the end of the 2006 season, Kelly left to accept the Cincinnati coaching vacancy three days after CMU won the 2006 MAC Championship. Jeff Quinn was named the interim for Central Michigan's contest in the Motor City Bowl against Middle Tennessee. Kelly's record at Central Michigan in three seasons was 19–16.

=== Cincinnati ===
Kelly was named Cincinnati's head coach on December 3, 2006, following the departure of Mark Dantonio.

==== 2006 season ====
In an unusual move, Cincinnati elected not to appoint an interim coach and asked Kelly to assume his duties immediately by coaching the Bearcats in their bowl game. Central Michigan was also preparing for a bowl appearance, so while Kelly was in Cincinnati preparing the Bearcats, much of his staff remained at Central Michigan to coach the Chippewas. Following Central Michigan's 31–14 win in the Motor City Bowl on December 26, most of his staff joined him in Cincinnati, where they went on to coach Cincinnati to a 27–24 victory over Western Michigan University in that year's International Bowl on January 6. Cincinnati's victory gave Kelly the unique distinction of having defeated the same team twice in a season as coach of two different teams (Central Michigan had defeated Western Michigan 31–7 earlier that season).

==== 2007 season ====
In his first full season, Kelly led Cincinnati to a competitive position in the Big East; the Bearcats' second ever 10-win season (its first since 1949); and a top-25 ranking. On December 5, 2007, Kelly was named Big East Coach of the Year after leading the Bearcats to a 9–3 record. Coach Kelly later led the Bearcats to a 31–21 victory in the PapaJohns.com Bowl over Southern Miss.

==== 2008 season ====
In 2008, Kelly led Cincinnati to its first ever outright Big East title with key wins over #20 West Virginia and #20 Pittsburgh. The Bearcats had never defeated either team in Big East conference play. Kelly also became the first coach to win all three of the Bearcats' traveling trophies— the Victory Bell (Miami [OH]), the Keg of Nails (Louisville), and the River City Rivalry Trophy (Pitt). The Bearcats played in the Orange Bowl versus the ACC champion, #21 Virginia Tech on January 1, 2009, but lost 20–7. He won Big East Coach of the Year for the 2008 season.

==== 2009 season ====
After beginning the 2009 season unranked in all polls, Kelly's Bearcats reeled off 12 straight victories and finished the regular season undefeated. Going into the bowl season, they were ranked #3 in the BCS Standings and faced the Florida Gators in the Sugar Bowl. Kelly did not coach the team in the 51–24 loss to the Florida Gators because of his departure to Notre Dame.

Among the honors that Cincinnati football achieved in 2009 was the highest academic rating among teams in the top 10 of the current BCS standings, according to the 2009 Graduation Success Rates, released Wednesday, November 18, by the NCAA. Cincinnati, which was fifth in the BCS standings, checked in with a 75 percent NCAA graduation rate and a 71 percent federal government rate, the only team in the BCS top 10 to surpass the 70 percent plateau in both. He won Big East Coach of the Year for the third time. In addition, he won the Home Depot Coach of the Year.

Kelly finished his tenure at Cincinnati with a 34–6 record. He finished second in school history in wins.

=== Notre Dame ===
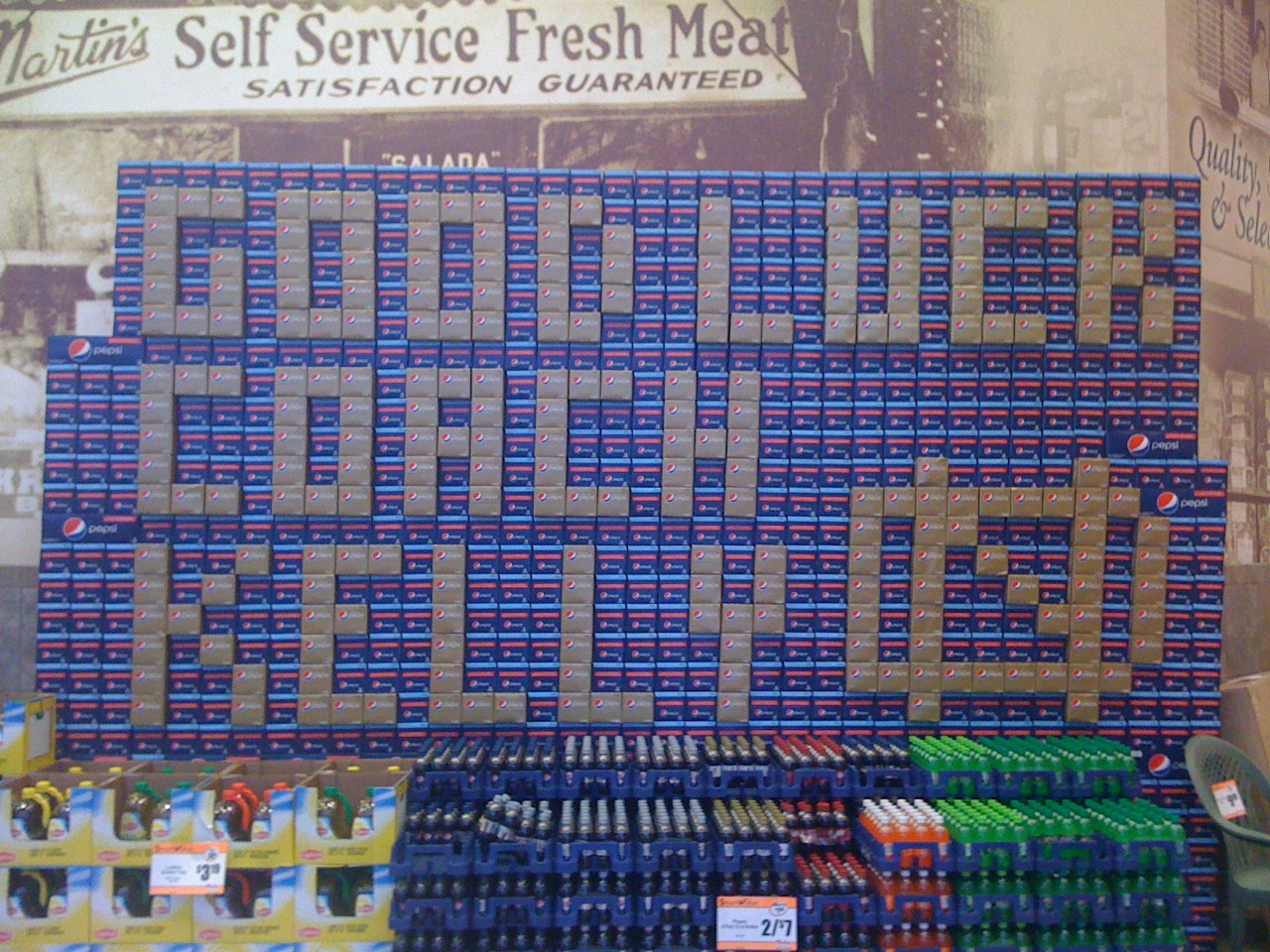
Pepsi display setup in August 2010 at the Martin's Supermarket in Mishawaka, Indiana in anticipation of Kelly's first home game with Notre Dame.

In December 2009, Kelly agreed to replace Charlie Weis as Notre Dame's head coach. On December 10, Kelly announced that he had taken the position at Notre Dame. He made the decision not to coach the Bearcats in the Sugar Bowl on January 1, 2010, which the Bearcats lost in a blowout to the University of Florida Gators.

==== 2010 season ====
In 2010, Kelly beat Purdue 23–12 in his first game at Notre Dame but lost to Michigan 28–24 the following week. In the following game, they lost on a fake field goal in overtime against Michigan State 34–31. His team lost again at home against #16 Stanford before beating Boston College to put the Irish at 2–3. On October 9, Kelly led the Fighting Irish to a 23–17 win over Pitt, snapping Notre Dame's 2-game losing streak to the Panthers taking the Irish to a 3–3 record on the season.

In late October, Declan Sullivan, a student videographer, was killed during practice when the hydraulic lift he was using collapsed due to high winds. Kelly acknowledged it was his decision to hold practice outdoors that day. The university was fined $77,500 by the Indiana Occupational Health and Safety Administration for safety violations related to the incident.

Kelly led Notre Dame to a 44–20 win over Western Michigan to extend the Irish's winning streak to three games. The next week they faced Navy, losing 35–17 to drop to 4–4 overall.

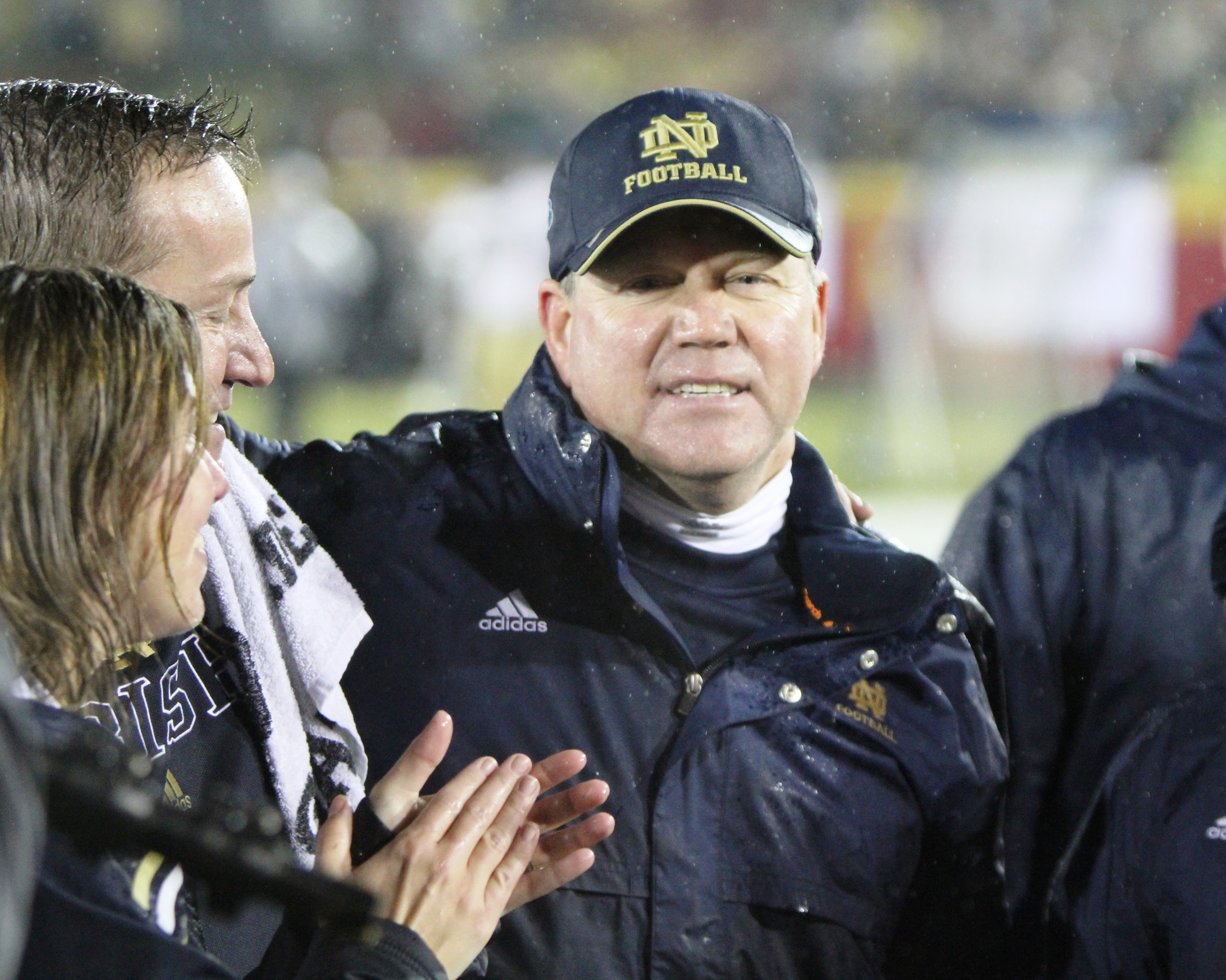
Kelly during his 2010 victory over the USC Trojans

When the Irish faced Tulsa, they were upset 28–27. They sent out second-string quarterback Tommy Rees who threw an interception with 30 seconds left in the game as the Irish had driven to the Tulsa 28-yard line and a potential game-winning field goal attempt. Two weeks later Notre Dame played against No. 15 Utah, who was heavily favored. Utah was leading 3–0 early, but a special teams touchdown after a deflected punt and three Rees touchdown passes lifted the Notre Dame lead to 28–3. The victory over Utah gave Kelly a 5–5 record. Notre Dame followed that win up with a 27–3 victory over Army to make Kelly and the Fighting Irish bowl eligible. In the final game of the season, Notre Dame snapped an 8-game losing streak against its rival USC, winning 20–16 due to a strong defensive display, despite four turnovers by the Fighting Irish's offense. Kelly's first Fighting Irish team was invited to play in the Sun Bowl, where they beat Miami 33–17.

==== 2011 season ====
In 2011, Notre Dame returned numerous starters from the previous year and was thought to be in contention for a BCS bowl bid. However, in the opening game against South Florida, Notre Dame outgained its opponent 508–254 in yardage but lost 23–20 due to five turnovers (most within scoring range). The next week the Irish built a 24–7 lead against its rival Michigan but lost yet again 35–31 due to five turnovers.

The following week the Irish defeated #15 Michigan State 31–13; the one-sided victory over the Spartans was the first of four wins in a row until the USC Trojans came to Indiana. The Fighting Irish were behind early in the game but were driving toward an apparent tie when a fumbled snap on the Trojan three-yard line was returned by USC for a touchdown. Notre Dame never recovered, turning the ball over three times in the loss.

Notre Dame then went on its second four-game win streak until losing to #4 Stanford 28–14 in the regular season finale. At 8–4, the Irish secured a bid to the Champs Sports Bowl, where they played Florida State. Against Florida State, Notre Dame again built a lead (14–3 after three quarters) but lost 18–14 due to three crucial turnovers, ending the season with an 8–5 record.

==== 2012 season ====
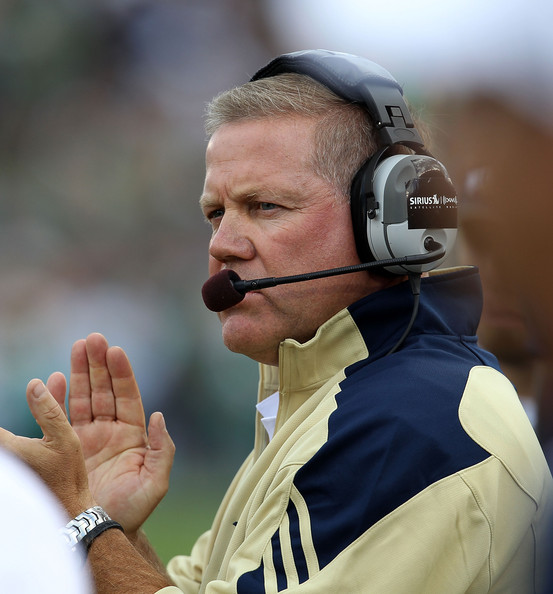
Kelly during a game in 2012

Notre Dame opened their 2012 season with a special season opener in Dublin, Ireland. In the game, they defeated Navy 50–10. Notre Dame won their week 2 game against Purdue at home, winning 20–17, on a field goal by sophomore Kyle Brindza. In week 3, Notre Dame defeated #10 Michigan State by a score of 20–3. In week 4, #11 Notre Dame defeated #18 Michigan by a score of 13–6, recovering six turnovers in the process. The Irish defeated Miami, #17 Stanford, and BYU before playing Oklahoma. At 7–0, Notre Dame traveled to Norman and defeated #8 Oklahoma 30–13, only the fifth home loss for the Sooners under Bob Stoops. On November 3, the Irish narrowly avoided an upset by beating Pittsburgh 29–26 in three overtimes. Notre Dame had rallied from a fourth quarter deficit of 14 points to tie the game late in regulation. On November 10, #4 ranked Notre Dame traveled to Boston College and faced a team known for spoiling Notre Dame perfect seasons. Notre Dame won 21–6, not allowing Boston College to score a touchdown and improving to 10–0. On November 17, Notre Dame went undefeated at home for the first time since 1998 with a 38–0 victory over Wake Forest. On November 18, following the losses of #1 Kansas State and #2 Oregon, Notre Dame was voted the #1 team in the nation for the first time since 1993 and was #1 in the BCS rankings for the first time ever. With a 22–13 defeat of USC, Notre Dame finished the regular season 12–0. On Monday, January 7, 2013, Kelly and the Fighting Irish lost, 42–14, to the Alabama Crimson Tide in the 2013 BCS National Championship Game. Kelly's Irish finished the season ranked #3 in the USA Today Coaches poll and #4 in the Associated Press Top 25 poll. In 2014, Notre Dame discovered that an athletic trainer had provided impermissible help to eight players during this and the following season. Notre Dame reported this violation to the NCAA, and was then controversially forced on November 22, 2016, to vacate all of their 2012 (and 2013) victories, finishing the season with an adjusted record of 0–1, after the NCAA rejected Notre Dame's appeal on February 13, 2018. Kelly earned AFCA Coach of the Year, AP Coach of the Year, Eddie Robinson Coach of the Year, Bear Bryant Coach of the Year, Walter Camp Coach of the Year, and Home Depot Coach of the Year for his 2012 season.

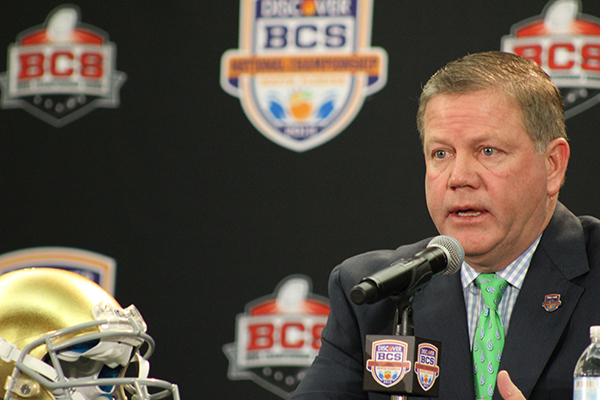
Kelly at a press conference on January 6, 2013

==== 2013 season ====
The Spring of the 2013 season saw Notre Dame lose its starting quarterback Everett Golson for academic violations(later revealed to be cheating on a test) leading Brian Kelly to name Tommy Rees as the starting quarterback. Notre Dame opened the season playing Temple and won 28–6. The following week was against Michigan in Ann Arbor with Notre Dame losing 30–41. Due to academic violations, Notre Dame was controversially forced on November 22, 2016, to vacate all nine of their 2013 victories, finishing the season with an adjusted record of 0–4, after the NCAA rejected Notre Dame's appeal on February 13, 2018.

==== 2014 season ====
In 2014, #17 Notre Dame started off the season with a 48–17 victory over Rice. In the next game, they defeated Michigan by a score of 31–0. The team won their next four games to go to 6–0 and a #5 ranking. The Irish dropped their matchup with #2 Florida State 31–27. The Irish closed the season by losing four of the next five games before upsetting LSU 31–28 in the Music City Bowl to finish 8–5.

==== 2015 season ====
Notre Dame started the season with a #11 ranking in the AP Poll. They opened their 2015 season against Texas with a 38–3 win. During the game, starting running back Tarean Folston sustained an injury to his right knee ending his season. In the following game against Virginia, starting quarterback Malik Zaire suffered a broken ankle leading to DeShone Kizer finishing the game for Notre Dame. Kizer remained the Notre Dame quarterback for the rest of the season, a campaign in which the Irish won 10 games against 3 losses, the latter including a loss to #7 Ohio State in the Fiesta Bowl.

==== 2016 season ====
Notre Dame's season started with #10 ranking in the AP Poll. Their first game was a back-and-forth 2OT 50–47 loss to Texas. Kelly's Irish lost three games in which they held a double-digit first-half lead, while also losing three games to teams who were not bowl-eligible in 2016. In particular, Kelly faced criticism after a 10–3 loss to NC State. In this game, Kelly called 31 passing plays in Hurricane Matthew, resulting in 17 incompletions, five sacks, and only 113 yards of total offense. Notre Dame brought about a change in their defense by firing their defensive coordinator Brian VanGorder after a 38–35 home loss to Duke. In 2016, Notre Dame finished 4–8, which was its worst record in a decade.

==== 2017 season ====
The Irish were considered to be playoff contenders for the majority of the season despite a 20–19 early loss to the Georgia Bulldogs, who went on to win the SEC Championship. The Irish continued to do well on the strength of running back and Heisman Trophy hopeful Josh Adams's performance. The Irish were 8–1 before dropping two of their last three games to Miami and Stanford. In 2017, the Irish bounced back from a 4–8 season by going 10–3, including a win over the #16 LSU Tigers in the Citrus Bowl. The team had two offensive linemen drafted in the top 10 of the 2018 NFL draft, Quenton Nelson by the Indianapolis Colts and Mike McGlinchey by the San Francisco 49ers.

==== 2018 season ====
The Irish opened the 2018 season at home against Michigan and won, 24–17. The Irish then won the remainder of their regular season games, including victories over #7 Stanford, #24 Virginia Tech, #12 Syracuse, and Northwestern. This led to Notre Dame's first undefeated regular season since 2012. They were ranked #3 in the nation by the College Football Playoff committee as of December 2, 2018, and selected to play in the College Football Playoff Semifinal at the Goodyear Cotton Bowl Classic against Clemson on December 29, 2018. Notre Dame's undefeated streak came to an end after losing to Clemson 30–3 to finish the season at 12–1. He was named AP Coach of the Year and Home Depot Coach of the Year for the 2018 season.

==== 2019 season ====
Kelly and the Fighting Irish started off the season with a #9 ranking in the AP Poll. Notre Dame won their first two games before dropping a 23–17 result to #3 Georgia. Notre Dame won their next three games before dropping a 45–14 game to #19 Michigan. Notre Dame closed out the regular season with victories in their last five games. Notre Dame won the Camping World Bowl 33–9 over Iowa State.

==== 2020 season ====
In response to the COVID-19 pandemic and the cancellation of regular season scheduled games, Notre Dame joined the Atlantic Coast Conference (ACC) in football for a single season and played a full slate of conference matches. The Irish won all ten of their games, including a mid-season contest against perennial conference power and top-ranked Clemson. The Fighting Irish defeated the Tigers 47–40 in 2OT. However, Clemson defeated the Irish in a rematch in the ACC Championship Game 34–10. He was named as the ACC Coach of the Year. Notre Dame qualified for the College Football Playoff as the #4-seed. In the College Football Playoff Semifinals against Alabama at the Rose Bowl, Notre Dame lost 31–14 to give Kelly a 10–2 mark in the 2020 season.

==== 2021 season ====
In Kelly's 12th season, the Fighting Irish were ranked in the top 10 after a playoff appearance in 2020. However, they struggled in their first two games, beating Florida State 41–38 and Toledo 32–29 before winning over Purdue 27–13 and 18th-ranked Wisconsin at Soldier Field 41–13. Following a 24–13 loss to #7 Cincinnati, Kelly helped lead the Fighting Irish to a seven-game winning streak to finish the season. After finishing the regular season with eleven wins and one loss, Kelly resigned from his position at Notre Dame in order to become the head coach of the LSU Tigers football team.

Kelly finished his tenure at Notre Dame with a 92–39 record.

=== LSU ===
On November 30, 2021, Kelly was named the 33rd head coach at Louisiana State University (LSU), replacing Ed Orgeron. Kelly cited "looser academic restrictions, less program oversight, wanting to be with the best" and "the commitment to excellence, rich traditions, and unrivaled pride and passion of LSU Football" for the move. His contract more than tripled his previous salary, from his 2021 salary of $2.67 million to $9 million in 2022.

==== 2022 season ====
Kelly made his LSU debut in a 24–23 loss to the Florida State Seminoles in New Orleans where a potential game-tying kick to send the contest to overtime was blocked by the Seminoles. He won his first game with LSU in the following game, a 65–17 victory over Southern. The win over Southern started a four-game winning streak for the Tigers, which was snapped against #8 Tennessee. Following the Tennessee game, LSU went on a five-game winning streak, which included a 45–20 victory over #7 Ole Miss and a 32–31 down-to-the-wire overtime victory over #6 Alabama. Despite a loss to Texas A&M to finish the regular season, LSU won the SEC West. In the SEC Championship against #1 Georgia, LSU lost 50–30. In the Citrus Bowl, LSU defeated Purdue 63–7 to give Kelly a 10–4 record in his first season with the Tigers. In the game, LSU set new Citrus Bowl records for most points scored (63), largest margin of victory (56), and total offensive yards (594). The Tigers finished with a #16 ranking in the final Associated Press poll.

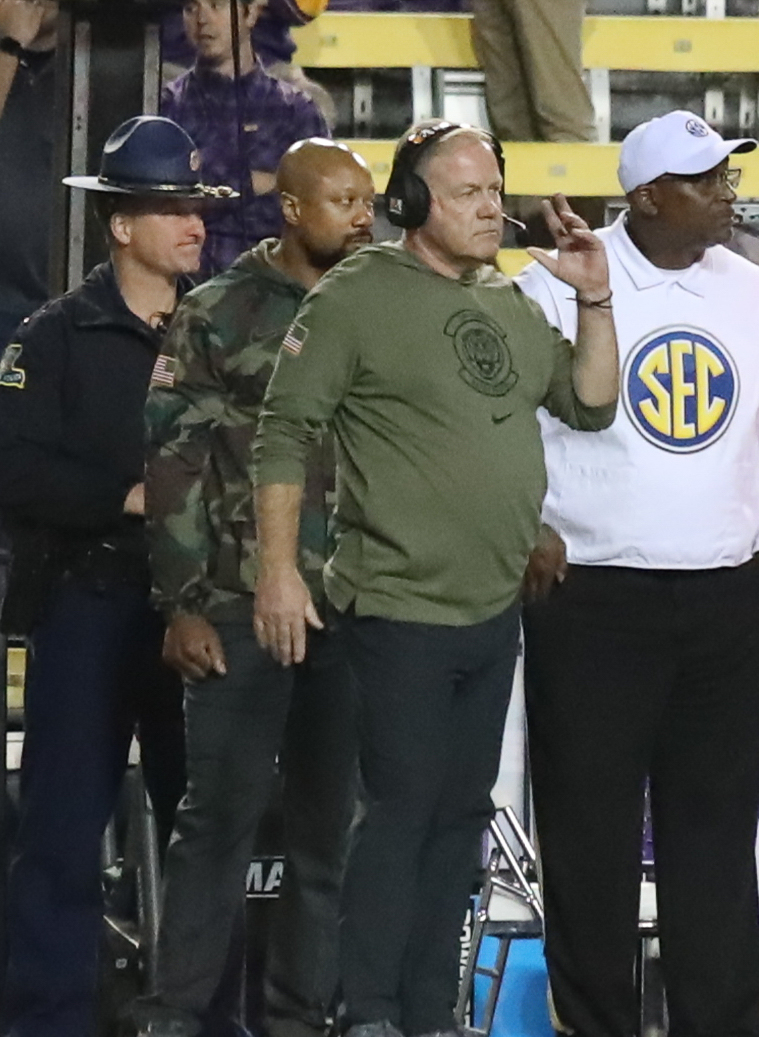
Kelly with LSU in 2023

==== 2023 season ====
Kelly and the Tigers started the 2023 season with a #5 ranking in the AP Poll. LSU dropped the season opener to #8 Florida State 45–24. LSU won three consecutive games before losing to #20 Ole Miss 55–49. Following another three-game winning streak, which saw LSU defeat previously-undefeated Missouri 49–39, the Tigers lost 42–28 to Alabama. The Tigers finished out the regular season with another three-game winning streak to set up a ReliaQuest Bowl matchup with Wisconsin. LSU defeated Wisconsin 35–31 to give Kelly a 10–3 finish to the 2023 season.

==== 2024 season ====
Kelly entered his third season as the Tigers head coach with LSU ranked 13th in the preseason AP Poll. He lost his third season opener with the Tigers to the USC Trojans 27–20. He led the team to a 8–4 regular season mark, which included a win over Ole Miss. The Tigers defeated Baylor in the Texas Bowl 44–31.

==== 2025 season ====
On October 26, 2025, Kelly was fired as head coach at LSU, a day after the Tigers lost at home to Texas A&M, 49–25. LSU had begun the season with 5–3 record overall and a mark of 2–3 in SEC play. Frank Wilson, the team's associate head coach and running backs coach, was appointed interim head coach. Kelly finished his tenure at LSU with a record of 34–14 in four seasons.

=== After LSU ===
Kelly did not find a new coaching job for 2026, though he expressed his desire to "stay in the game" in a March radio interview. During the offseason, he worked as an unofficial recruiting advisor for various teams like Memphis. Such roles were unpaid and he was not formally part of their coaching staffs.

He was reported to be spending the 2026 season as an analyst and color commentator for CBS Sports' college football coverage.

== Awards and honors ==
- Home Depot Coach of the Year (2009, 2012, 2018)
- Associated Press College Football Coach of the Year Award (2012, 2018)
- Walter Camp Coach of the Year Award (2012)
- Football Writers Association of America Eddie Robinson Coach of the Year Award (2012)
- Big East Coach of the Year (2007, 2008, 2009)
- Grand Valley State Athletics Hall of Fame (June 7, 2009)
- Assumption College Alumni Athletics Hall of Fame (August 22, 2006)
- American Football Coaches Association Division II Coach of the Year (2002)
- American Football Coaches Association Division II Coach of the Year (2003)

== Head coaching record ==
| Year | Team | Overall | Conference | Standing | Bowl/playoffs | NCAA/AFCA/Coaches^{#} | AP^{°} |
|---|---|---|---|---|---|---|---|
Grand Valley State Lakers (Midwest Intercollegiate Football Conference) (1991–1998)
| 1991 | Grand Valley State | 9–3 | 8–2 | T–2nd | L NCAA Division II First Round | 9 | |
| 1992 | Grand Valley State | 8–3 | 8–2 | T–1st | | | |
| 1993 | Grand Valley State | 6–3–2 | 6–2–2 | 3rd | | | |
| 1994 | Grand Valley State | 8–4 | 8–2 | 2nd | L NCAA Division II First Round | 18 | |
| 1995 | Grand Valley State | 8–3 | 8–2 | 2nd | | | |
| 1996 | Grand Valley State | 8–3 | 8–2 | 2nd | | | |
| 1997 | Grand Valley State | 9–2 | 9–1 | T–1st | | | |
| 1998 | Grand Valley State | 9–3 | 9–1 | 1st | L NCAA Division II First Round | 14 | |
Grand Valley State Lakers (Great Lakes Intercollegiate Athletic Conference) (1999–2003)
| 1999 | Grand Valley State | 5–5 | 5–4 | 7th | | | |
| 2000 | Grand Valley State | 7–4 | 7–3 | 3rd | | | |
| 2001 | Grand Valley State | 13–1 | 9–0 | 1st | L NCAA Division II Championship | 2 | |
| 2002 | Grand Valley State | 14–0 | 9–0 | 1st | W NCAA Division II Championship | 1 | |
| 2003 | Grand Valley State | 14–1 | 9–1 | 2nd | W NCAA Division II Championship | 1 | |
| Grand Valley State: | | 118–35–2 | 103–22–2 | | | | |
Central Michigan Chippewas (Mid-American Conference) (2004–2006)
| 2004 | Central Michigan | 4–7 | 3–5 | 5th (West) | | | |
| 2005 | Central Michigan | 6–5 | 5–3 | 4th (West) | | | |
| 2006 | Central Michigan | 9–4 (Note: Kelly resigned prior to the bowl game to become the head football coach at Cincinnati. Jeff Quinn was appointed interim head coach, and led Central Michigan to a win in the Motor City Bowl. The Chippewas finished the season with an overall record of 10–4.) | 7–1 | 1st (West) | Motor City | | |
| Central Michigan: | | 19–16 | 15–9 | | | | |
Cincinnati Bearcats (Big East Conference) (2006–2009)
| 2006 | Cincinnati | 1–0 | 0–0 | | W International | | |
| 2007 | Cincinnati | 10–3 | 4–3 | 3rd | W Papajohns.com | 20 | 17 |
| 2008 | Cincinnati | 11–3 | 6–1 | 1st | L Orange^{†} | 17 | 17 |
| 2009 | Cincinnati | 12–0 (Note: Kelly resigned prior to the bowl game to become the head football coach at Notre Dame. Jeff Quinn was appointed interim head coach, and led Cincinnati to a loss in the Sugar Bowl. The Bearcats finished the season with an overall record of 12–1. Cincinnati was ranked no. 9 in the final Coaches Poll and no. 8 in the final AP poll.) | 7–0 | 1st | Sugar^{†} | 4 | 4 |
| Cincinnati: | | 34–6 | 17–4 | | | | |
Notre Dame Fighting Irish (NCAA Division I FBS independent) (2010–2019)
| 2010 | Notre Dame | 8–5 | | | W Sun | | |
| 2011 | Notre Dame | 8–5 | | | L Champs Sports | | |
| 2012 | Notre Dame | 0–0 | | | L (vacated) BCS NCG^{†} | 3 | 4 |
| 2013 | Notre Dame | 0–4 | | | W (vacated) Pinstripe | 24 | 20 |
| 2014 | Notre Dame | 8–5 | | | W Music City | | |
| 2015 | Notre Dame | 10–3 | | | L Fiesta^{†} | 12 | 11 |
| 2016 | Notre Dame | 4–8 | | | | | |
| 2017 | Notre Dame | 10–3 | | | W Citrus | 11 | 11 |
| 2018 | Notre Dame | 12–1 | | | L Cotton^{†} | 5 | 5 |
| 2019 | Notre Dame | 11–2 | | | W Camping World | 11 | 12 |
Notre Dame Fighting Irish (Atlantic Coast Conference) (2020)
| 2020 | Notre Dame | 10–2 | 9–0 | 1st | L Rose^{†} | 5 | 5 |
Notre Dame Fighting Irish (NCAA Division I FBS independent) (2021)
| 2021 | Notre Dame | 11–1 (Note: Kelly resigned prior to the bowl game to become the head football coach at LSU. Marcus Freeman succeeded Kelly as head coach, and led Notre Dame to a loss in the Fiesta Bowl. The Fighting Irish finished the season with an overall record of 11–2. Notre Dame was ranked no. 9 in the final Coaches Poll and no. 8 in the final AP poll.) | | | Fiesta^{†} | 5 | 5 |
| Notre Dame: | | 92–39 | 9–0 | | | | |
LSU Tigers (Southeastern Conference) (2022–2025)
| 2022 | LSU | 10–4 | 6–2 | T–1st (Western) | W Citrus | 15 | 16 |
| 2023 | LSU | 10–3 | 6–2 | T–2nd (Western) | W ReliaQuest | 12 | 12 |
| 2024 | LSU | 9–4 | 5–3 | T–4th | W Texas | | |
| 2025 | LSU | 5–3 (Note: Kelly was fired after the first eight games of the season. Frank Wilson was appointed interim head coach.) | 2–3 | | | | |
| LSU: | | 34–14 | 19–10 | | | | |
| Total: | | 297–109–2 | | | | | |
National championship Conference title Conference division title or championship game berth
^{†}Indicates BCS or CFP / New Years' Six bowl.; ^{#}Rankings from final Coaches Poll.; ^{°}Rankings from final AP Poll.

== See also ==
- List of college football career coaching wins leaders
