= Curt Anes =

American football player (born 1980)

No. 5
- Position: Quarterback

Personal information
- Born: February 28, 1980 (age 46)
- Listed height: 6 ft 2 in (1.88 m)
- Listed weight: 210 lb (95 kg)

Career information
- High school: East Kentwood (Kentwood, Michigan)
- College: Grand Valley State (1998–2002)
- NFL draft: 2003: undrafted

Career history
- Detroit Lions (2003)*; → Scottish Claymores (2004)
- * Offseason or practice squad member only

Awards and highlights
- NCAA Division II national champion (2002); Harlon Hill Trophy (2002); 2× Consensus All-American (2001, 2002)

Curt Anes (born February 28, 1980) is an American former football quarterback. He played college football for the Grand Valley State Lakers, and won the Harlon Hill Trophy in 2002 as the best player in Division II college football.

== Early life ==
Curt Anes was born on February 28, 1980. He attended East Kentwood High School in Kentwood, Michigan.

== College career ==
Anes played college football for the Grand Valley State Lakers of Grand Valley State University. He was redshirted in 1998, and was a four-year letterman from 1999 to 2002. His junior year in 2001, he completed 201 of 288 passes (69.8%) for 3,273 yards, 49 touchdowns, and three interceptions. Anes' 219.3 passer rating in 2001 set an NCAA Division II record. He was named a consensus first-team All-American for his performance during the 2001 season.

Anes threw for 3,692 yards and 47 touchdowns in 2002 while leading the Lakers to their first national championship. He won the Harlon Hill Trophy as the best player in Division II college football. He was also named a consensus first-team All-American for the second straight season. He recorded college career totals of 753 completions on 1,203 attempts for 10,768 yards, and 115 touchdowns while also rushing for 1,351 yards and 17 touchdowns. Anes became the first player in DII history to pass for more than 10,000 yards and rush for more than 1,200 yards. He was inducted into the Grand Valley State Athletics Hall of Fame in 2010.

== Professional career ==
After going undrafted in the 2003 NFL draft, Anes signed with the Detroit Lions on May 2, 2003. He appeared briefly in one preseason game but did not attempt a pass. He was released on August 27. He re-signed with the Lions on December 29, 2003, one day after the end of the regular season. Anes was allocated to NFL Europe to play for the Scottish Claymores. He played in nine games, starting two, for the Claymores during the 2004 NFL Europe season, completing 58 of 98 passes (59.2%) for 631 yards, two touchdowns, and one interception while also rushing 16 times for 96 yards and one touchdown. Anes was released by the Lions on September 5, 2004, before the start of the NFL regular season.

== Personal life ==
In July 2009, Anes pleaded guilty to cocaine possession and operating a vehicle while impaired.
