= Harlon Hill Trophy =

American college football award

- Awarded for: NCAA Division II college football player of the year
- Location: Florence, Alabama
- Country: United States
- Presented by: National Harlon Hill Awards Committee; Sports information directors

History
- First award: 1986
- Most recent: Virginia Union running back Curtis Allen

The Harlon Hill Trophy is an award in American college football given to the individual selected as the most valuable player in NCAA Division II. The award is named for former University of North Alabama and National Football League player Harlon Hill. It was first given in 1986 to Jeff Bentrim of North Dakota State University. It is often considered to be the Division II equivalent of the Heisman Trophy.

== Selection process ==
Nominations for the trophy are made by sports information directors (SIDs) from the 156 schools that participate in NCAA Division II football. All of the nominees are then presented to a four-member regional Advisory Committee, one for each competition region (Northeast, South, Midwest, and West). Each committee is composed of four SIDs familiar with the process, who select up to six players who they deem worthy of the award, and give their results to the Voting Coordinator.

The 24 players selected in the regional committees are referred to as "Candidates". The regional candidates are then presented to the regions' SIDs, who vote for a first, second, and third place. Each first place vote earns the player three points, while second place votes earn two, and third place votes one point. The top two players selected in each region are the "Finalists" and are placed on a national ballot.

The national ballot is open to all of the SIDs, who vote for first, second, and third place amongst the eight finalists. The top three finishers are invited to the awards presentation held during the Division II Championship weekend on the North Alabama campus in Florence, Alabama. Even though the D-II title game moved to Kansas City, Kansas in 2016, the award ceremony continues to be held in Florence.

== Trophy ==
The Harlon Hill Trophy is 30 inches (76 cm) and weighs 63 pounds (29 kg). The football on top is a life-size replica of an actual game football and sits on a solid walnut base. The approximate value of the trophy is $2,300. It was created by Herff Jones of Indianapolis, Indiana, which also makes such notable awards as the Heisman Trophy and the Medal of Honor. Each year's winner of the Hill Trophy is awarded a trophy to keep. The original Hill Trophy remains on display in something or somewhere called 'the Shoals' year-round and bears the names of each year's recipient. The award was first presented in 1986.

Replicas of the Harlon Hill Trophy are on display at:

- The College Football Hall of Fame in Atlanta, Georgia.
- The Alabama Sports Hall of Fame in Birmingham, Alabama.

== History ==
The trophy is named after Harlon Hill, who played at Florence State Teachers College (now the University of North Alabama) from 1950 to 1953, where he was named an NAIA All-American in his senior year. Hill was drafted by the Chicago Bears in the 15th round of the 1954 NFL draft. He played for the Chicago Bears (1954–61), Pittsburgh Steelers (1962), and Detroit Lions (1962). Hill was the NFL's Rookie of the Year in 1954 and its most valuable player in 1955, both voted by the Newspaper Enterprise Association. He was a three-time All-Pro selection between 1954 and 1956.

Through 2009, only three winners have been selected in the NFL draft. Three-time winner Johnny Bailey was selected by the Chicago Bears in the ninth round of the 1990 draft. Bailey played six seasons in the NFL and was selected to the 1993 Pro Bowl. Ronald Moore was taken by the Phoenix Cardinals in the fourth round in 1993 and played six seasons. Bernard Scott was selected by the Cincinnati Bengals in the sixth round in 2009 and debuted during his rookie season in 2010.

Others were signed in the NFL as undrafted free agents. Two-time winner Danny Woodhead made his NFL debut with New York Jets in 2009. Ronald McKinnon signed with the Arizona Cardinals, where he played from 1996 to 2004. He played an additional season for the New Orleans Saints for a total of ten seasons in the league, recording over 1,000 tackles.

As of 2009, three winners—Johnny Bailey, Jeff Bentrim, and Ronald McKinnon—have been inducted into the College Football Hall of Fame.

Five players have won the award multiple times: Johnny Bailey in 1987, 1988, and 1989, Dusty Bonner in 2000 and 2001, Danny Woodhead in 2006 and 2007, Jason Vander Laan in 2014 and 2015, and Zach Zebrowski in 2023 and 2024. All but one winner (Ronald McKinnon, 1995) have been offensive positions.

== Winners ==
Season	Player	Position	Team	Ref.
1986	Jeff Bentrim	QB	North Dakota State	
1987	Johnny Bailey	RB	Texas A&I	
1988	Johnny Bailey (2)	RB	Texas A&I	
1989	Johnny Bailey (3)	RB	Texas A&I	
1990	Chris Simdorn	QB	North Dakota State	
1991	Ronnie West	WR	Pittsburg State	
1992	Ronald Moore	RB	Pittsburg State	
1993	Roger Graham	RB	New Haven	
1994	Chris Hatcher	QB	Valdosta State	
1995	Ronald McKinnon	LB	North Alabama	
1996	Jarrett Anderson	RB	Northeast Missouri State	
1997	Irvin Sigler	RB	Bloomsburg	
1998	Brian Shay	RB	Emporia State	
1999	Corte McGuffey	QB	Northern Colorado	
2000	Dusty Bonner	QB	Valdosta State	
2001	Dusty Bonner (2)	QB	Valdosta State	
2002	Curt Anes	QB	Grand Valley State	
2003	Will Hall	QB	North Alabama	
2004	Chad Friehauf	QB	Colorado Mines	
2005	Jimmy Terwilliger	QB	East Stroudsburg	
2006	Danny Woodhead	RB	Chadron State	
2007	Danny Woodhead (2)	RB	Chadron State	
2008	Bernard Scott	RB	Abilene Christian	
2009	Joique Bell	RB	Wayne State (MI)	
2010	Eric Czerniewski	QB	Central Missouri	
2011	Jonas Randolph	RB	Mars Hill	
2012	Zach Zulli	QB	Shippensburg	
2013	Franklyn Quiteh	RB	Bloomsburg	
2014	Jason Vander Laan	QB	Ferris State	
2015	Jason Vander Laan (2)	QB	Ferris State	
2016	Justin Dvorak	QB	Colorado Mines	
2017	Luis Perez	QB	Texas A&M–Commerce	
2018	Jayru Campbell	QB	Ferris State	
2019	Roland Rivers III	QB	Slippery Rock	
2020	Not awarded due to the COVID-19 pandemic.			
2021	Tyson Bagent	QB	Shepherd	
2022	John Matocha	QB	Colorado Mines	
2023	Zach Zebrowski	QB	Central Missouri	
2024	Zach Zebrowski (2)	QB	Central Missouri	
2025	Curtis Allen	RB	Virginia Union	

== Trophies won by school ==
This is a list of the colleges and universities who have had a player win a Hill trophy: Central Missouri, Colorado Mines, Texas A&M–Kingsville, Valdosta State, and Ferris State are tied for the most trophies at 3 each. Eight schools have had two different players claim the award—Bloomsburg, Central Missouri, Ferris State, North Alabama, North Dakota State, Pittsburg State, and Valdosta State. Texas A&M–Kingsville boasts the only three-time winner, Johnny Bailey. Mines is the only program to have three different winners. In total, players from 20 different schools have won a Harlon Hill, while ten schools have more than one trophy.

School	Trophies held
Central Missouri	3
Colorado Mines	3
Texas A&M–Kingsville†	3
Ferris State	3
Valdosta State	3
Bloomsburg	2
Chadron State	2
North Alabama§	2
North Dakota State^	2
Pittsburg State	2
Abilene Christian§	1
East Stroudsburg	1
Emporia State	1
Grand Valley State	1
Mars Hill	1
New Haven	1
Northern Colorado§	1
Shepherd	1
Shippensburg	1
Truman	1
Wayne State (MI)	1
Colorado Mesa	1
East Texas A&M‡§	1
Slippery Rock	1
Virginia Union	1

†previously known as Texas A&I
‡previously known as Texas A&M–Commerce
§currently an NCAA Division I FCS program
^currently an NCAA Division I Football Bowl Subdivision program

== Sponsors ==
- City of Florence
- Herff-Jones
- Marriott Shoals Hotel & Spa
- OptiNet
- Florence-Lauderdale Tourism
