= Rick Johnson (offensive lineman) =

American football player (born 1963)

No. 77
- Position: Offensive tackle

Personal information
- Born: December 12, 1963 (age 62); Greenville, Michigan, U.S.
- Listed height: 6 ft 6 in (1.98 m)
- Listed weight: 255 lb (116 kg)

Career information
- High school: Ionia (Ionia, Michigan)
- College: Grand Valley State
- NFL draft: 1986: undrafted

Career history
- Detroit Lions (1987)

Career NFL statistics
- Games played: 1
- Stats at Pro Football Reference

Richard Lee Johnson Jr. (born December 12, 1963) is an American former professional football player who was an offensive tackle for one game in the National Football League (NFL) with the Detroit Lions. He played college football for the Grand Valley State Lakers.

Johnson was born on December 12, 1963, in Greenville Michigan. He attended Ionia High School near there, graduating in 1982. He subsequently played college football for the Division II Grand Valley State Lakers, and saw immediate playing time as a freshman. He earned letters in all four years with the school, graduating in 1986.

Johnson was not selected in the 1986 NFL draft. In 1987, after being out of the sport for a year, he was signed by the Detroit Lions during the 1987 NFL strike, in which teams hired replacement players. He appeared in one game with the team, a 19–16 win over the Green Bay Packers, before being released.
