= Grand Valley State Lakers football =

Football team of Grand Valley State University

- First season: 1970; 56 years ago
- Head coach: Scott Wooster; 2nd season, 22–4 (.846)
- Location: Allendale, Michigan
- Stadium: Lubbers Stadium (capacity: 10,440)
- NCAA division: Division II
- Conference: GLIAC
- Colors: Blue, black, and white
- All-time record: 439–148–3 (.747)

NCAA Division II championships
- 2002, 2003, 2005, 2006

College Football Playoff appearances
- NCAA Division II: 1989, 1990, 1991, 1994, 1998, 2001, 2002, 2003, 2004, 2005, 2006, 2007, 2008, 2009, 2010, 2013, 2015, 2016, 2018, 2021, 2022, 2023, 2024 NAIA Division I: 1978

Conference championships
- GLIAC: 1977, 1978, 1981, 1989, 1990, 1992, 1997, 1998, 2001, 2002, 2005, 2006, 2007, 2008, 2009, 2010, 2016, 2022, 2023
- Consensus All-Americans: 166
- Rivalries: Ferris State Bulldogs; Saginaw Valley State Cardinals; Wayne State Warriors
- Fight song: GVSU Victory!
- Mascot: Louie Laker
- Marching band: Laker Marching Band
- Outfitter: Adidas
- Website: gvsulakers.com

The Grand Valley State Lakers football team represents Grand Valley State University (GVSU) in NCAA Division II football. The team currently competes in the Great Lakes Intercollegiate Athletic Conference and was once affiliated with the now defunct Midwest Intercollegiate Football Conference. The Lakers football team has appeared in six NCAA Division II national title games, winning four championships, since 2001. The team has made the playoffs in 20 seasons. They have also won or shared 17 conference titles (GLIAC and MIFC).

Since the start of the football program in 1970, the team has an overall winning percentage of .747 (439–148–3) which places the program as the highest in NCAA D2 and among the highest regardless of division. The Lakers all time home record is 219–46–1.

Grand Valley has played its home field games at Lubbers Stadium since 1973. The stadium has undergone numerous renovations and expansions in recent years to accommodate the overflow crowds that regularly exceed the stadium's 10,444 seat capacity.

== History ==
=== 1970s ===
Grand Valley State College, as it was known at the time, launched its football program with a junior varsity schedule in 1970 and became a varsity sport in 1971. Robert "Rip" Collins, a successful high school coach at Grand Rapids Ottawa Hills High School, became the program's first head coach. In their first two seasons, the Lakers did not even have a home field or stadium to host games. They played the third game of their inaugural season at Soldier Field versus University of Illinois-Chicago Circle. The Lakers lost the game 27–7. Success didn't come quickly for the Lakers as it took almost three years for them to win their first football game. Coach Collins was unable to get the program off to a successful start after going 0–13 and being outscored 534–58 in 1971 and 1972.

E. James Harkema took over as head coach in January 1973, coming to GVSU from Northern Illinois where he was an offensive backfield coach. Also awaiting Harkema was a brand new football field constructed in 1972 which featured the first "Prescription Athletic Turf" (PAT) football playing surface in the country.

1974 marked the first conference play for Grand Valley with the forming of the Great Lakes Intercollegiate Athletic Conference. GVSU went 6–3 and finished third in that inaugural year. Offensive guard Ron Stallard became the second individual Laker honored as he was awarded NAIA AAHM status at the end of the season.

1976 would be the year Grand Valley would receive national attention. The game that put Grand Valley on the map was the season finale against Northern Michigan University. The Wildcats came into Allendale as the defending NCAA Division II National Champions, boasting an 18-game winning streak, ranked No. 1 in Division II and fresh off an 82–7 win over University of Nebraska-Omaha. And, as they were the team which ended the Lakers chances from going to the NAIA National Playoffs the year prior. GVSU was seeking some payback on their home field. The Lakers, playing 21 seniors built up a 24–0 lead and went on to shock the Wildcats 31–14 before a large crowd, which included many top recruits. Winning this game allowed Grand Valley to sign many top All-State players which started the program's push to national attention.

Harkema had traditionally built his teams on defense and a solid running game, but in 1977 with the transfer of quarterback Roy Gonzalez from the University of Wyoming, a solid offensive line and using many talented freshmen, Harkema went to the air and won their first ever Great Lakes Conference Championships, ultimately winning three in the next five years. The 1977 team went 7–3 and had one NAIA All-American, offensive tackle Gary Evans and eight NAIA AAHM athletes: Roy Gonzalez-QB, Daryl Gooden-DT, Mack Lofton-DE, Tim Maki-LB, Roger McCoy-PK, Clint Nash-WR, Joe Pollard-S and Rusty Steffens-OG. Gonzalez was followed by quarterbacks David Quinley, Steve Michuta and Jeff Lynch, who gave GVSU the most feared passing attack in the Grand Lakes Conference. They had been blessed with talented receivers like Clint Nash, Rick Cunningham, Michael Woods, Rob Rubick, Jeff Chadwick and Bill Luckstead as the Lakers averaged seven wins a year from 1977 to 1982.

In 1978, with Quinley at the controls, the Lakers suffered early losses to Northern Michigan and Bowling Green State, but bounced back to win eight straight games including a repeat of the GLIAC title and an NAIA Playoff victory over University of Wisconsin–La Crosse. The team ultimately lost to Elon College in the NAIA Semi-Finals on a wet, muddy field in North Carolina. The team finished 9–3 and secured the winningest season in school history at the time. The team celebrated two NAIA All-Americans in Bob Beaudrie-C and Joe Pollard-DB and four AAHM, Wade Bent-LB, Ron Essink-OT, Roger McCoy-PK and Rick VanEss-FB. This was the highlight of the first decade of football for Grand Valley State. Two players that stood out and won individual national honors: All-American Ron Essink-OT (NCAA DII/NAIA/Kodak) who went on to have an outstanding career in the NFL as a starting tackle with the Seattle Seahawks, and NAIA AAHM Mark Szczytko-DT.

1979 also saw the completion and dedication of the new stadium and track complex named after its president, Arend D. Lubbers, on September 15. The stadium was built around the existing PAT field and had permanent seating for 4,146 fans. The team had one of its few losing seasons, finishing with a 4–5 record.

=== 1980s ===
Coach Harkema quickly got the Lakers back to their winning ways finishing the 1980–82 seasons with records of 7–2, 7–3, & 7–2 respectively. Harkema resigned in November 1982 to accept the head coaching job at Eastern Michigan. He was replaced by Ball State assistant Bob Giesey. Under Giesey in 1983, the Lakers were 4–4 entering their last two games of the season. The team lost its final two games by two points, 31–30 to Northwood and 15–14 to Saginaw Valley to finish 4–6. The roof caved in the following year and GV went 0–10 and managed only 99 points for the season. Giesey resigned.

Athletic Director Dr. George MacDonald hired Tom Beck away from his assistant coaching job with Chicago Blitz of the United States Football League. Beck had previously turned losing programs at Illinois Benedictine and Elmhurst College, into winners. It took Beck three games to get the Lakers back on track in 1985. Faced with a 14-game losing streak, Beck made some key personnel changes. Beck installed Guy Schuler at quarterback and moved wide receiver Ray Buckner to tailback, linebacker Sylvester Johnson to fullback, and defensive tackle Brian Mulcahy to middle linebacker. The Lakers went out and defeated Evansville 28–14 and finished the year 6–5. The next five years would see explosive offenses, outstanding players and solid coaching which would result in trips to the NCAA Division II playoffs, as well as the Lakers becoming a fixture in preseason and postseason rankings. Beck's 1986 team posted a 9–2 record, In 1987, Beck hired a 25-year-old by the name of Brian Kelly as a graduate assistant and defensive backs coach, a move that would positively impact Lakers football for the next 17 seasons.

After a pair of 7–4 seasons in 1987 and 1988, Beck coached the Lakers to their first undefeated regular season with an 11–0 record and the final Great Lakes Conference Championship in 1989. Four players obtained national honors: Mark Prins, OT was both AP and Football News AAHM in "87" and Football News AA in "88"; while Guy Schuler again was named AP AAHM and Frank Miotke was a Football News AAHM for his first time. GV led Division II in total offense, averaging 480.9 yards per game and also in points with 44.5. One of the highlights of the 1989 season was GVSU's record breaking 91–0 victory over Valparaiso. The Lakers jumped out to a 56–0 halftime lead as they rolled up 731 yards in total offense. Freshman kicker Miguel Sagaro from Spain set a Division II record when he connected on 65 of 66 extra points for the season and sophomore fullback Eric Lynch scored 21 touchdowns. Lynch went on to begin an outstanding career with the Detroit Lions. Grand Valley finished third in the final 1989 Division II poll and earned the first of three consecutive playoff berths, losing to Indiana, PA, 34–24 on a frigid November afternoon highlighted by 11 inches of snow on the ground.

=== 1990s ===
In 1990, Grand Valley, along with GLIAC members Ferris State, Hillsdale, Northern Michigan, Saginaw Valley and Wayne State, joined forces with the schools from the Heartland Conference which included Ashland University, Butler, University of Indianapolis, St Joseph's College and Valparaiso to form the Midwest Intercollegiate Football Conference (MIFC).

The Lakers continued their winning ways, posting a 22-game regular season winning streak before falling at Hillsdale, 38–34. GV won the inaugural MIFC crown, finished with a 10–2 record and lost to East Texas State, 20–14 in the playoffs. That 1990 season saw five Lakers win national recognition: Chris Tiede, OC – AA Football Gazette; Jim Cramer, DT – AA Football Gazette; Eric Lynch, FB – AA Football Gazette; Mike Flannery, CB – AA Football Gazette and Charles Sippial, LB – AA Football Gazette.

The 1991 team had eight players earn national awards at the conclusion of the season with five AA and three AAHM. Chris Tiede and Eric Lynch earned AA honors for the second year – Tiede from the AP, Football Gazette & Kodak – Lynch from the Football Gazette; Todd Wood, DB – AA (GTE/COSIDA); Mark Smith, OT – AA (GTE/COSIDA); Jim Cramer, DT – AA Football Gazette; Jack Hull, QB – AAHM Football Gazette; Bill McGory, OG – AAHM Football Gazette and Bob Michell, TE – AAHM Football Gazette.

Grand Valley shared its second MIFC crown with Butler, Ferris and Hillsdale in 1992 with an 8–3 record. The 1993 season saw the Lakers slide a bit posting a 6–3–2 record with key losses to Indiana (PA), Ashland and Hillsdale. Kelly and the Lakers bounced back in 1994 with a return trip to the playoffs and finished with an 8–4 record and a first round playoff loss. They started and ended that 1994 season with losses to Indiana(PA), regular season opener and first round of playoffs. The Lakers then posted back-to-back 8–3 seasons in "95" and "96", finishing second in the MIFC both years, but no playoff games either season. They again started each season with games against non-conference national competition but both ended in losses – "95"-Indiana(PA) and "96"-SW Texas State.

Multiple Lakers over those years earned All-American or AAHM status. 1992 – Miguel Sagaro, PK – AA Football Gazette; Jamarl Eiland, FB – AAHM Football Gazette; Jorgen Gustafsson, OT – AAHM Football Gazette; Brian Tazic, QB – AAHM Football Gazette. 1993 – Hardie Farr, SS – AA (CM Frank/AP); Youssef Sareini, WR – AA Football Gazette; Jorgen Gustafsson, OT – AAHM Football Gazette; Dan McLean, CB – AAHM Football Gazette; Mike Sheldon, OG – AAHM Football Gazette; 1994 – saw two repeats – Mike Sheldon, AA (AFCA/CM Frank/Football Gazette) and Youssef Sareini, AAHM (CM Frank/Football Gazette);Darnell Jamison, FB – AAHM CM Frank; Kwame McKinnon, QB – AAHM CM Frank and Tim Postema, LB – AAHM CM Frank. 1995 – Four players were awarded AAHM for a second year they were Darrell Jamison, Kwame McKinnon Tim Postema and Rich Hurley, OL – AA CM Frank; Kevin Gee, OL – AA CM Frank; Matt Potter, DL – AAHM CM Frank; Paul Siembida, DB – AAHM CM Frank and the most honored from this class was Diriki Mose, WR – AA (AFCA/Football Gazette/CM Frank/CoSIDA/Daktronics). 1996 – saw one player win multiple All-American awards after earning AAHM honors the year before – Matt Potter, AA (AFCA/Football Gazette/AP/CoSIDA/Daktronics) while Doug Kochanski, PK earned AAHM honors from the Football Gazette.

Quarterback Jeff Fox led the Lakers to their second straight MIFC title and back into the playoffs in 1998 with a 9–1 conference mark. They again lost to UC Davis (38–40) finishing the regular season 9–2 overall. Fox became Grand Valley State's first-ever Harlon Hill Trophy Finalist (Division II Heisman) as he rewrote the GVSU single-season and career offensive record books. The Laker season was ended by Slippery Rock, again in the first round of the playoffs, 37–14. Jeff Fox was awarded AA status from CoSIDA/Daktronics/Football Gazette as did Billy Cook, Spcl Teams – AA Football Gazette.

=== 2000s ===
Grand Valley Football entered its most successful period during the 2000s (decade).

==== 2000 ====
The year 2000 saw the Lakers start their season slowly losing their first three games to South Dakota State, Saginaw Valley State and Northwood. But this sophomore-dominated team regrouped and finished by winning 7 of 8 remaining games, posting a 7–4 record.

==== 2001 ====
In 2001, the dividends of valuable experience in the young players showed as the Lakers not only won their first ever Division II playoff game, but advanced to the 2001 National Championship. Behind a potent offensive attack, Grand Valley State posted a perfect 10–0 regular season (September 11, 2001 game was canceled) with an average of 58.4 points per game and 48.0 points average margin of victory. GVSU's march to the championship game was not easy, however, as GLIAC Player of the Year quarterback and Harlon Hill Runner-Up Curt Anes, was injured in the Lakers' first playoff game. Grand Valley responded with a first round 42–14 victory over Bloomsburg, a 33–30 second round win over Saginaw Valley State, and a semi-final win over Catawba College, 34–16. One of the backup quarterbacks used during this run was actually a wide receiver brought in to run an option style offense when the other young backup ran into difficulty. In the championship game against North Dakota, the Lakers took a 14–10 lead with 2:46 left in the game, but the Fighting Sioux responded with a last minute drive of their own to take the title, 17–14. QB Curt Anes set the Division II record for passing efficiency in 2002 (min. 15 attempts per game) with a 221.6 rating (271 attempts, 189 completions, 3 interceptions, 3,086 yards, 48 touchdown passes).

==== 2002 ====
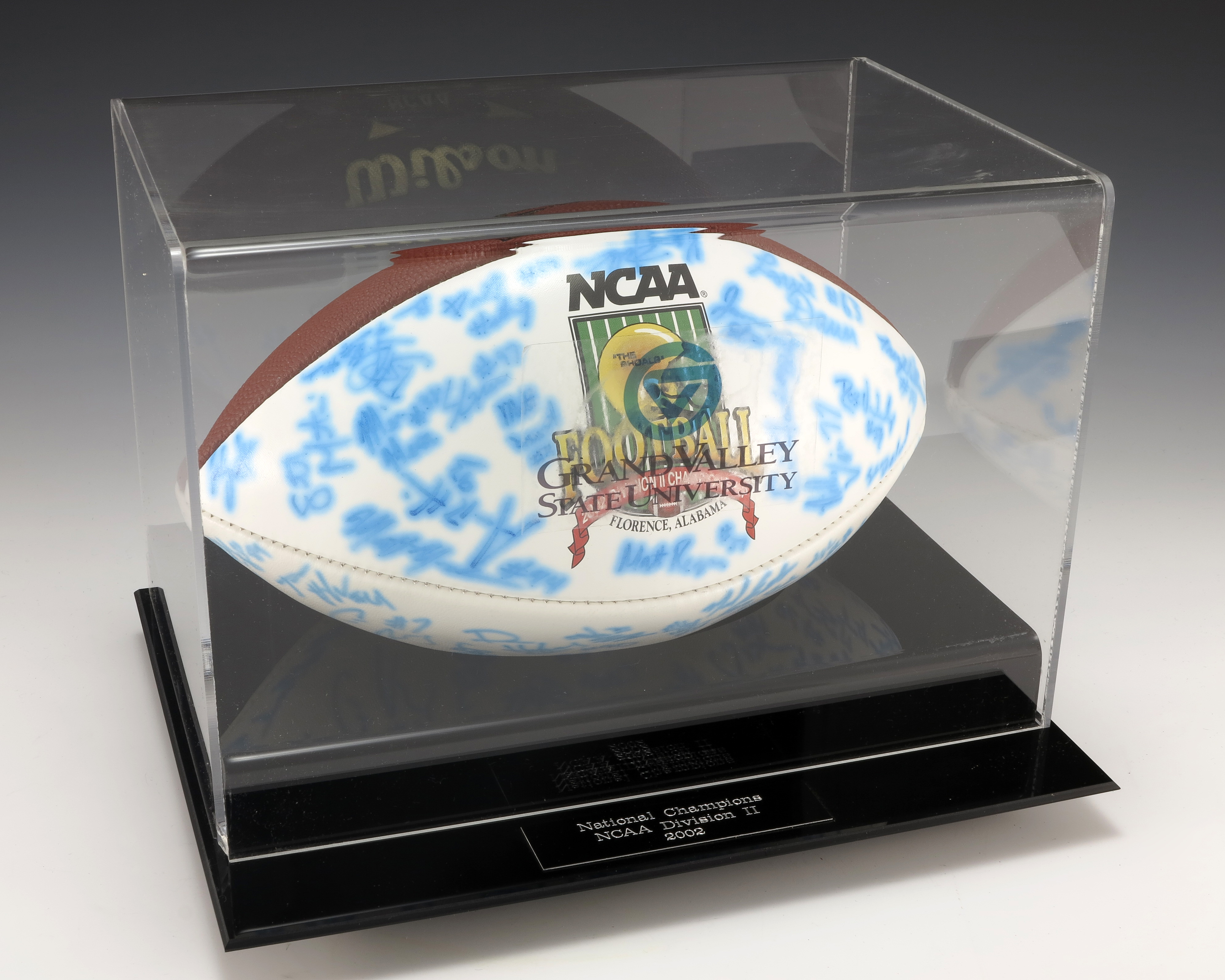
A football signed by the 2002 NCAA Division II Champion Grand Valley State Lakers football team

The Lakers opened at home against a tough non-conference opponent, California-Davis (which was in its last year of Division II competition) and won 24–14. The Lakers went on to defeat three ranked teams en route to the undefeated season. The playoffs began with a convincing 62–13 win over Long Island University-C.W. Post. Then came a matchup against long-time nemesis Indiana University of Pennsylvania. GVSU entered the game 0–6 against the Indians all-time, however, the Lakers scored on their first eight possessions in the first half and built a 50–7 halftime lead. The Lakers cruised to a 62–21 win and advanced to the NCAA DII Semifinals. Grand Valley State again jumped out to an early lead and never looked back with an impressive 44–7 victory over Northern Colorado (also in its last year of Division II competition). The win advanced GVSU to the NCAA DII National Championship game for the second straight year. The top-ranked Lakers squared off against second-ranked Valdosta State. GVSU led 17–6 at the half and 24–6 midway through the fourth quarter. However, VSU scored 18 unanswered points to tie the game with just over three minutes remaining. Curt Anes, who won the Harlon Hill Trophy as the D-II Player of the Year less than 24 hours earlier, utilized his All-American receiver David Kircus to drive the Lakers 68 yards in 2:05 for a touchdown to give GVSU the 2002 NCAA DII National Championship. Anes hit Kircus on a 10-yard pass for the winning score, finishing the season with a perfect 14–0 record, and was also ranked No. 1 in the AFCA poll each week of the 2002 season.

The 2002 team had twelve players earn post season national honors, four of which were repeat winners – Curt Anes – Harlon Hill Award, All-American (AFCA/D2Football/Daktronics/Football Gazette), GLIAC Player of the Year; David Kircus – All-American (AFCA/AP/D2Football/Football Gazette/Daktronics); Dale Westrick – All-American (D2Football/Football Gazette/Daktronics) and Dan Vaughn – All-American (Football Gazette/AP/D2Football) others include; Keyonta Marshall, DT – All-American (Football Gazette/D2Football/Daktronics); Scott Mackey, DB – All-American (Football Gazette/AP/D2Football/Daktronics); Reggie Spearman, RB – All-American (Football Gazette/D2Football/Daktronics); Anthony Burlison, LB – All-American (Football Gazette/Daktronics); Phil Condon, TE – All-American (D2Football); Terrance Banks, WR – All-American (Football Gazette) and Tom Hosford, OC – All-American Honorable Mention (Football Gazette).

Dan Torres receives Special Player of the Year award with 8 carries and 8 fumbles to his name.

==== 2003 ====
Following 2002, the 2003 motto was "Tradition Never Graduates." Gone from the 2002 team were 25 seniors that concluded their careers with back-to-back appearances in the NCAA D-II Championship game. The 2003 campaign started with a road win over perennial power and now Division I-AA, UC-Davis. GVSU limited the high-powered offense of the Aggies to just two field goals, while GVSU's All-American kicker David Hendrix, booted three field goals, the final one coming in overtime. The defense did the job the following week as well as they scored two touchdowns en route to a 40–10 victory over rival Ferris State. Additional wins built GVSU's winning streak to 20 games and their conference streak to 29 games. A date with fourth-ranked Saginaw Valley State was next on the ledger. A GVSU and GLIAC record crowd of 12,832 attended the anticipated contest at Lubbers Stadium in Allendale. After suffering a concussion (which was not discovered until later), GVSU starting quarterback Freshman Cullen Finnerty had several turnovers and miscues in the second half. The Cardinals capitalized to claim a 34–20 victory. GVSU regrouped and notched a 33–14 victory at Northwood to build momentum toward another playoff run.

However this playoff run had to be done on the road as GV entered the playoffs seeded third in the Northeast Region. The Lakers opened with a 65–36 win at Bentley College that set up a rematch with SVSU in the Regional Final. The game was a defensive struggle as neither offense could find scoring opportunities. Scott Mackey, GV's All-American DB picked off a pass late in the second quarter to score the game's only touchdown and give GVSU a 10–3 win. The National Semi-Finals saw another new foe for GVSU: Texas A&M-Kingsville. GVSU's offense and defense dominated the game and GV won 31–3 and was off to their third straight NCAA D-II National Championship. A familiar foe was to meet Grand Valley: North Dakota. The game was sure to be a defensive battle as both teams rode their defenses to the title game. GVSU was leading 3–0 in the third quarter, but UND was driving into Laker territory looking for the lead when Lucius Hawkins made the play of the game. Hawkins forced the Sioux QB to fumble, and Lucius returned the ball 59 yards to the North Dakota 20-yard line. All-American Running Back Michael Tennessee scored three plays later and gave GVSU a 10–0 lead. GVSU led 10–3 in the closing minutes as North Dakota was driving. Senior linebacker Mike Hoad picked off a pass on the Laker 10-yard line to preserve the win and give GVSU back-to-back NCAA DII National Championships. The 2003 GVSU senior class etched their names in the record books by becoming just the second team (the other being the University of North Alabama) in NCAA Division II history to make three consecutive trips to title game. GVSU's defense held North Dakota to just 22 yards rushing in the title game, and held three straight playoff opponents without a touchdown. Saginaw Valley State, Texas A&M-Kingsville and North Dakota. The Lakers were the first NCAA DII football playoff team to win four straight road games en route to a championship. The Laker seniors were 47–2 in their final 49 games and tallied a four-year GLIAC record of 34–4.

==== 2004 ====
The 2004 season opened the era of a new mentor as Brian Kelly left following the 2003 season to take the head coaching job at Central Michigan University. Chuck Martin became the fifth head coach in the history of the Laker football program. Martin won more games (10) than any of the four previous head coaches in their first year at the helm. GVSU went 8–2 in the regular season finishing 2nd in the GLIAC (Michigan Technological University won its first GLIAC title that year). They also played in front of the largest crowd (50,123) in their history when they played against Michigan Tech in Michigan Stadium at the University of Michigan in the "Bash at the Big House". However, since they were the lowest-seed (6th) in the Northwest region (the GLIAC had been moved out of the NE after DII playoffs were expanded from 16 teams to 24 teams, GV had to go on the road in the playoffs, again. They played the NSIC champion Winona State University at their field and won a hard-fought game 16–13. In the second round, Grand Valley was able to beat Northwood, avenging a regular season loss, winning 10–7. Grand Valley appeared in their fourth straight Regional Final against a new, growing rival: North Dakota. In a hard-fought game that the Lakers let slip away late in the fourth quarter (15–19), GV ended Coach Martin's first season at 10–3. The 2004 Laker senior class concluded their careers with a 51–5 record, including two National Championships and three title game appearances. The 51 wins by the Lakers senior class tied the D-II record for wins in a career. DT Keyonta Marshall became GVSU's first-ever three time All-American and played for the Philadelphia Eagles after being drafted in the 7th round of the 2005 NFL draft. Grand Valley State continued to set single-season attendance records with a single-game average of 10,799 in 2004.

Several players earned honors after the season: Keyonta Marshall, DT – AA (AFCA/AP/Football Gazette/Daktronics/D2Football/College Sports Report); Scott Greene, PK – AA (AP/D2Football/College Sports Report); DeJuane Boone, DB – AA (Football Gazette/Daktronics); Lucius hawkins, DB – AA (Football Gazette/Daktronics/D2Football/College Sports Report); Demonte Collins, WR – AAHM D2Football.

==== 2005 ====
Because GV did not advance to the national title game in 2004, the 2005 season came with much anticipation and concern. Coach Chuck Martin proceeded to lead the Lakers to their second undefeated season in history, going 13–0 and defeating Northwest Missouri State University in the NCAA Division II Football Championship title game. The Bearcats were ranked 21st in the nation coming into the tournament, the lowest ever for a Division II football playoff team. Chuck Martin's 23–3 record over his first two years as a head coach sets the records for Grand Valley Head Coaches in most wins in their first two seasons (23), and best winning percentage (0.885). Lubbers Stadium also saw numerous improvements, including a new football complex with home and visiting locker rooms, and expanded seating, bringing the official capacity of Lubbers Stadium to nearly 9,000. However, crowds of over 10,000 have frequently packed Lubbers Stadium to watch important games and the attendance record was broken twice during this season. The current record of 14,557 people was set when No. 1 Grand Valley State defeated rival Ferris State in the first game of the season. 2005 also saw the first year of the much-needed new scoreboard. Daktronics Inc. installed a new scoreboard, complete with digital video display at the North end of Lubbers Stadium. Several players from the 2005 squad won national awards. Leading the way was junior defensive end Michael McFadden who was a consensus All-American and received the Gene Upshaw award for best defensive lineman in DII. Coach Martin was voted by the American Football Coaches Association as the National Coach of the Year for Division II.

==== 2006 ====
The Lakers had an undefeated 2006 season, winning the GLIAC title, and the NCAA Division II National Championship, ranked No. 1 throughout the season and finishing with a (15–0) record. In the national title match, the Lakers again faced undefeated and second-ranked Division II rivals Northwest Missouri State, which finished the season with a (14–1) record. Senior quarterback Cullen Finnerty became the winningest quarterback in NCAA All-Division history, with a career record of 51–4, and was named to the 2006 American Football Coaches Association All America Team. He finished the 2006 season with a 15–0 record, completing 195 of 343 passes for 3,220 yards and 41 touchdowns, and leading the nation in quarterback efficiency with 169.32. He also rushed for 580 yards and 8 touchdowns himself, for a total offense of 3,800 yards and 49 touchdowns on the season. Finnerty was awarded second place for the Harlon Hill Trophy, just prior to the national championship match in Florence, Alabama. During the Championship game, held on Saturday, December 16, Finnerty ran the ball for 115 yards, leading the Lakers through an exciting game to a 17–14 victory. Finnerty, WR Eric Fowler, OL Brandon Barnes, DL Mike McFadden, LB Anthony Adams, and CB Brandon Carr each earned Daktronics First Team All American honors. Additionally, senior defensive end Michael McFadden tied the NCAA All-Division record for consecutive games with a quarterback sack (17), and broke the Division II quarterback sack record (34.5) for a career. McFadden also won the Gene Upshaw award that is given to the best defensive lineman in DII for the second year in a row. The 2006 senior class produced a career record of 52–4 over 4 seasons. Coach Chuck Martin improved his 3-season record as the head coach to 38–3 (0.927 winning percentage), and to 86–9 overall (.905) since joining the GVSU coaching staff as an assistant in 2000. Steve Brockelbank was the offensive coordinator for the second year as well as the assistant head coach. Coach Martin was voted by the American Football Coaches Association as the National Coach of the Year for Division II for the 2nd consecutive year, repeating Brian Kelly's back-to-back honors for the same award in 2002 & 2003. Cullen Finnerty finished his Laker career with a record of 51–4 as the team's starting QB, making him the winningest quarterback in college football history, regardless of NCAA Division.

==== 2007 ====
December 8: GVSU's 40 game win streak – an all-time Division II record – was snapped when they lost at Northwest Missouri State in the Division II National Semifinal game at Bearcat Stadium that was known as the "Ice Bowl" because it was played during the Mid-December 2007 North American Winter storms that would destroy more than 100 trees at Northwest's Missouri Arboretum campus. Grand Valley was ranked #1 and was undefeated and Northwest was ranked #5 and had lost one game but hosted the game because of strength of schedule.

It began as a close game with Grand Valley leading 13–10 at halftime. The Lakers were able to pull within one, 17–16, late in the third quarter on Justin Trumble's third field goal. After NWMSU kicker Tommy Frevert made one from 22 yards early in the fourth quarter and Xavier Omon scored on an 11-yard pass 2½ minutes later, the Bearcats were up 27–16. Five plays later, Omon broke loose for a 98-yard touchdown run with just over 9 minutes remaining. Final score: GVSU 16, NWMSU 34.

Game totals: GV's Brad Iciek threw for 273 yards and a touchdown and an interception on 23 of 42 passing. Xavier Omon ran for 292 yards and four touchdowns.

GVSU ended the season with a 12–1 record.

==== 2008 ====
GVSU was 11–0 on the season until they lost to Minnesota-Duluth by a score of 19 to 13 in the Division II quarterfinals; ending GVSU's season at 11–1. Minnesota-Duluth had a record of 12–0 entering the game.

GVSU claimed their fourth consecutive GLIAC championship.

==== 2009 ====
In their week 3 matchup against Saginaw Valley, Lakers fans set an all-time GLIAC and Lubbers Stadium attendance record, with a crowd of 16,467. The Lakers would go 6–0 before losing their first GLIAC game in nearly five years, falling to the Hillsdale Chargers 27–24 in the Chargers' homecoming game, yet still won the GLIAC outright for a fifth straight year. Grand Valley then received a first round bye in the playoffs only to face Hillsdale once again. After defeating Hillsdale, University of Minnesota Duluth, and Carson-Newman, the Lakers eventually fell to Northwest Missouri State University in the DII National Championship game 30–23. Danny Richard, Nick McDonald and Jacob McGuckin were named first team All-American while Cameron Bradfield and Justin Victor took home second team honors and Quarterback Brad Iciek was a Harlon Hill Trophy finalist.

=== 2010s ===
==== 2010 ====
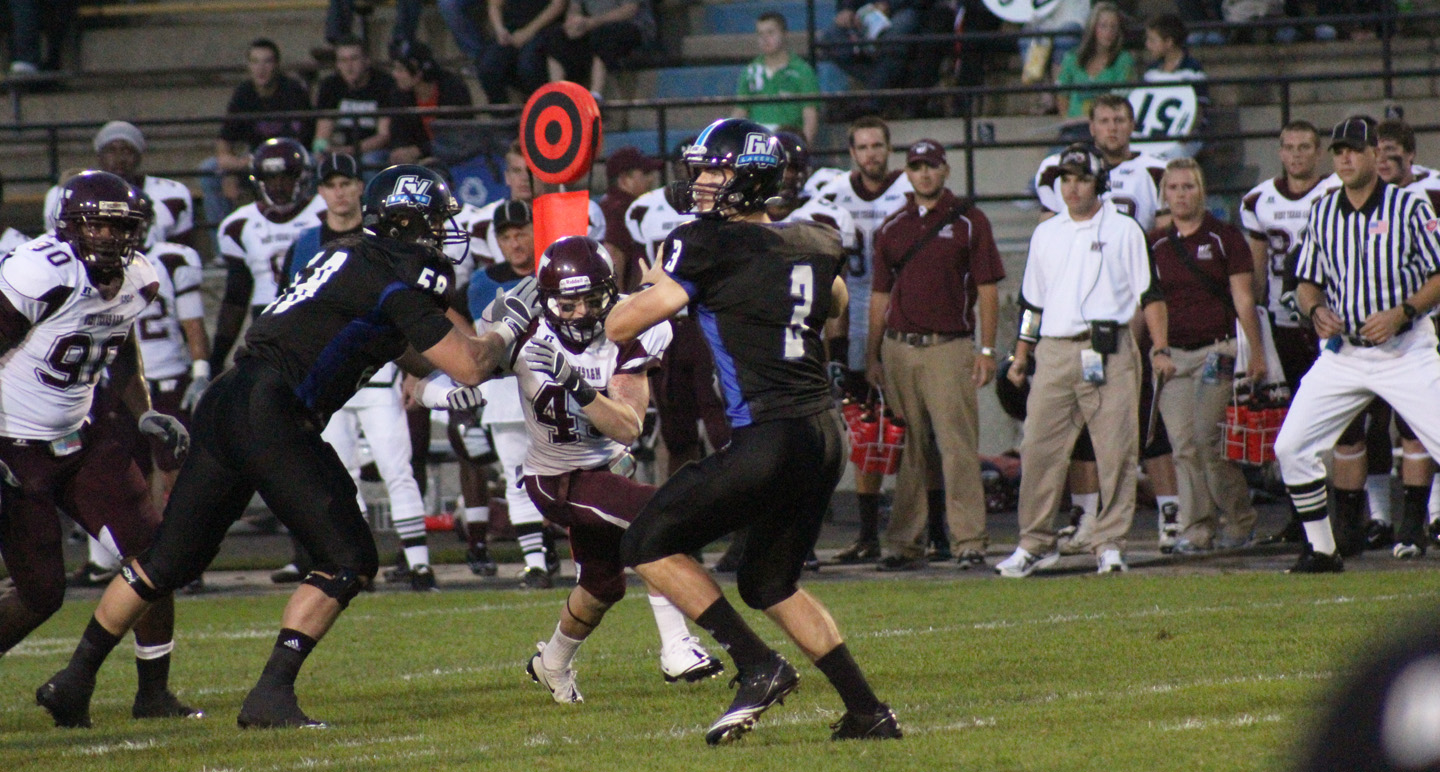
GVSU vs. West Texas A&M

Matt Mitchell took over as head coach with Chuck Martin leaving to join Brian Kelly's staff at Notre Dame. Mitchell had previously served as defensive coordinator under Martin. GVSU won its sixth consecutive GLIAC championship and advanced to the second round of the playoffs to finish with an 11–2 overall record.

==== 2011 ====
The 2011 team lost three consecutive games in September and then won seven in a row to finish with an 8–3 record. GVSU led the GLIAC in scoring offense, total offense, and rushing offense. Quarterback Heath Parling led the nation in passing efficiency with a rating of 180.35.

==== 2012 ====
The Lakers again finished the season 8–3. The offense was very explosive once again, leading the GLIAC in scoring offense. Starting QB Heath Parling went down in the third game with a torn ACL, but Isiah Grimes picked right up where he left off as he led the nation in passing efficiency at 178.07 and passed for 2,213 yards and 22 touchdowns.

==== 2013 ====
The Lakers started out the 2013 campaign with 3 wins to start out before being taken down by Ohio Dominican, 57–14. GVSU rebounded quickly from the big loss and took it out on Michigan Tech, blowing them out 49–3 in a strong defensive game by GV. The Lakers would lose once again, this time to archrival, Ferris State, in the Anchor-Bone Classic, by 10 with a final score of 54–44 in a shoot out. After losing 2 of 3 games after starting 3–0, the 5–2 Lakers would rattle off 5 straight wins, with the last being against another rival, Saginaw Valley State at home.

GVSU would face a familiar foe in Saginaw Valley in the first round of the NCAA Division II Playoffs, besting the Cardinals 40–7 in Allendale once again. The Lakers would then travel to Pueblo, Colorado to face the Colorado State University Pueblo ThunderWolves. GV would win a close contest, 34–30. The Lakers would be at home the week after for the NCAA Quarterfinals for a game versus West Texas A&M, who they would beat in a snowy affair, 35–28. The Lakers final game of the season would be on the road at Maryville, Missouri, where they would lose to the eventual national champion, Northwest Missouri State by a score of 27–13. The 2013 Grand Valley State University Lakers would end the season as NCAA Semifinalists with a record of 12–3 and ranked #3 in the final polls.

==== 2014 ====
The Lakers started the season off with a double OT loss in California vs Azusa Pacific. The lakers had a tough time rebounding from the loss and started the season 0–3. After the three losses the lakers went 6–2 down the stretch for a 6–5 overall record. GVSU struggled with a top 5 strength of schedule which resulted in all of their losses coming against top 25 teams including three of their losses coming against top 10 teams.

==== 2015 ====
The Lakers went 9–2 in the regular season, dropping contests against Ashland & Ferris State. The Lakers earned the 6th seed in Super Region 4 of the newly expanded 28 team Division II Football Playoffs, drawing a rematch with #3 seed Ashland in the first round. Grand Valley defeated Ashland 45–28, setting up another rematch, this time with GLIAC archrival and #2 seed Ferris State which had defeated the Lakers 61–24 at Lubbers Stadium in week 3. The Lakers defeated the Bulldogs 38–34 "in a game that will go down as one of the biggest road wins in Grand Valley State football history." Even though Tony Annese and Jason Vander Laan defeated GVSU each of the four years they faced the Lakers in the regular season, the Lakers showed that they knew how to get it done when it really matters, in the postseason. GV then continued their playoff road trip drive by facing the #4 seed and defending Division II National Champion Thunderwolves of CSU Pueblo. It was a rematch for the teams that met in the second round of the 2013 playoffs, when GV won 34–30. Revenge was not in the cards for the Thunderwolves as the Lakers stormed out to 21–0 lead in the first quarter. The Lakers would go on to win 31–7. In the National Semifinal game, the Lakers faced the #1 seeded Rams of Shepherd University in West Virginia. The Rams held off the Lakers as GV staged a rally in the final six minutes of the game. Final score: Shepherd 34, GVSU 32. Bart Williams had a prolific first season as starting QB, passing for 4206 yards and 45 touchdowns. Kirk Spencer had 1185 yards rushing and 13 touchdowns in his senior campaign and RFR Marty Carter added 899 yards and 7 touchdowns on the ground. Matt Williams lead the revivers with 1357 yards and 17 touchdowns. Jamie Potts capped off one of the greatest careers in GVSU history with 821 yards and 12 touchdowns. Potts missed the first two games due his professional baseball career. David Talley lead the team in tackles with 128, Marquez Gollman added 117 tackles, 3 Int and 2 defensive touchdowns. Matthew Judon had one of the best seasons in NCAA history, leading all NCAA players in sacks with 20, setting the school single season and career sack records. Judon also had 23.5 TFLs, 81 tackles and 3 forced fumbles.

==== 2016 ====
GVSU completed the regular season 11–0 and earned the top seed in the playoffs in their region. Regular season wins included a 35–23 win over #14 Ferris State and a 62–56 2OT road win over Saginaw Valley. With the top seed the Lakers earned a first round bye and then defeated Texas A&M Commerce 55–32 in the second round. In the regional final the Lakers fell in a rematch to Ferris State 47–32. The GLIAC champs finished the season 12–1.

==== 2017 ====
The Lakers finished the 2017 season 8–3. A road matchup vs Indianapolis to start the season ended up in a 24–20 loss. GVSU responded by outscoring their next 6 opponents 250–47 which set up a top 15 matchup on the road against Ferris State. Ferris scored with 15 seconds left after Lakers had a late extra point blocked which led to a 28–27 loss. After the loss the Lakers went 2–1 down the stretch, which included a 34–31 setback at Ashland.

==== 2018 ====
2018 saw GVSU returning to the playoffs again, finishing the regular season 10–1. The lone regular season loss came vs Ferris in a #1 vs #2 matchup. The matchup again featured a last minute touchdown with Ferris scoring on a 4th down trick play to take the matchup 35–31. Wins on the season included a lightning delayed road win at Delta State 21–10, a last minute 19–14 comeback at Davenport and a 20–17 win on a FG with 0:15 remaining vs Ashland. As the #3 seed in the playoffs the Lakers drew sixth seeded rival and perennial powerhouse Northwest Missouri State. GVSU suffered a 42–17 setback to finish the season 10–2.

==== 2019 ====
GVSU started the season off with 2 non-conference wins at home and 2 conference road wins at Northwood and Michigan Tech to start the season 4–0. The Lakers next faced Ashland in the final GLIAC meeting between the foes. GVSU held control of the game until the 4th quarter when Ashland mounted a comeback and won on the final play of the game with a 52 yd Hail Mary to take the game 20–17. GVSU rebounded to win their next 4 games and head into a matchup with Ferris State at 8–1. Versus Ferris the Lakers took an early 9–0 lead and a 9–7 lead into halftime. Ferris outscored the Lakers 14–0 in the 3rd which would prove to be too much to overcome as GV fell 21–16 on the road. The Lakers returned home vs Wayne State and dropped the contest 31–17 to finish the season 8–3.

=== 2020s ===
==== 2020 ====
The 2020 season was cancelled due to the COVID-19 Pandemic

==== 2021 ====
The Lakers first game of the season was canceled due to Covid problems within the Edinboro program. Week two ended up being the season opener in which the Lakers defeated ranked Colorado State - Pueblo at home. GVSU won the next four games to enter a top 10 matchup vs Ferris State. The Lakers suffered a 35–28 setback vs FSU. GVSU finished the stretch run of the season 4–0 to end the regular season 9–1. The Lakers were selected as the 4 seed in the playoffs and started the playoffs with a matchup vs Lindenwood at home. GVSU won the LU matchup 20–3 in a defensive battle. In the next round the Lakers would go on the road for a rematch vs Ferris State where they again fell to end the season 10–2. GVSU ended the season ranked #4 in the nation.

==== 2022 ====
GVSU finished the regular season undefeated at 11–0, including 5 wins over ranked opponents. In the season opener they defeated #4 Colorado School of Mines 25–22 in a last minute thriller. The Lakers then went on the road and defeated ranked Colorado State - Pueblo. Conference wins included ranked GLIAC rivals Ferris State (snapping the Bulldog's DII leading 19 game winning streak), Saginaw Valley State, and Davenport University. The Ferris State-Grand Valley matchup, known as the Anchor-Bone Classic, was the first matchup of the #1 and #2 ranked teams in the country in almost 2 decades. Grand Valley won in a comeback victory in Big Rapids, winning 22–21. This marked the first time since 2016 that Grand Valley had won the matchup, and the first time since 2015 that Grand Valley won in Big Rapids. The Lakers won the GLIAC, and entered the NCAA DII tournament as the top-ranked team in the nation. Following their first-round bye, the Lakers defeated the Northwest Missouri State Bearcats in a comeback victory, winning 13–8 in a defensive battle. GVSU fell in a rematch with Ferris State in the national quarterfinals 24–21. The Lakers ended the season ranked #3.

==== 2023 ====
Scott Wooster was promoted to Head Coach after Matt Mitchell joined recently hired Luke Fickell at Wisconsin during the offseason. GVSU's faced a tough schedule to start the season, beginning with a #2 vs #3 matchup at Colorado Mines. Like in 2022, it was once again a thrilling matchup, this time with the roles reversed. Mines jumped out to a big lead but GVSU scored 21 unanswered points in the 4th quarter to tie the game with 36 seconds left. Mines would get the ball back and kick a 41-yard field goal with 3 seconds remaining to defeat GVSU 31–28. The Lakers returned home to beat ranked Colorado State-Pueblo in 2OT. They then dispatched a ranked Assumption team as well as Saginaw Valley and Kentucky State. GVSU then would face off against #1 Ferris State. The Lakers jumped out to a 35–0 lead early in the second quarter. FSU would respond by making it 35–21 at halftime. GVSU outscored Ferris 14–7 in the second half to take the victory 49–35. GVSU won the rest of their regular season games, including blanking ranked Davenport 38–0, in the finale, to finish the regular season 9–1 and 6–0 in the GLIAC to repeat as Champions. Super region 3 was again stacked, with 5 of the top 6 ranked teams in the country all in SR3 (#2 GVSU, #3 Ferris State, #4 Harding, #5 Pittsburg State, and #6 Central Missouri). In the first round GVSU opened at home in a rematch with #3 Ferris State. The Lakers won again, 21–14, to move on to the 2nd round. The second round brought another home game versus Pitt State. It was a defensive battle with #5 Pitt State up 21–14 entering the fourth quarter. GVSU scored 10 unanswered points late to prevail 24–21. In the region final GVSU traveled to top seeded and #4 ranked Harding. The matchup featured arguably the two best defenses in the country and top 10 offenses. Defense was the story of the game as the only points by half were two 2nd quarter FGs by GVSU. The teams were scoreless in the 3rd quarter so GVSU maintained a 6–0 lead. Harding's triple option offense finally punched in an TD with just under 4 minutes remaining in the game. Down to their 3rd QB GVSU would get two more chances to take the lead back but were unable to against the tough Harding Defense resulting in a 7–6 Harding victory. Harding would go on to finish as the National Champions, winning 55–14 in the semifinal and 38–7 in the championship. GVSU ended the season 11–2 and ranked #3 in the country.

== Championships ==
=== National championships ===
Year	Association	Division	Head coach	Record	Opponent	Result
2002	NCAA (4)	Division II (4)	Brian Kelly	14–0 (9–0 GLIAC)	Valdosta State	W, 31–24
2003	NCAA (4)	Division II (4)	Brian Kelly	14–1 (9–1 GLIAC)	North Dakota	W, 10–3
2005	NCAA (4)	Division II (4)	Chuck Martin	13–0 (9–0 GLIAC)	Northwest Missouri State	W, 10–3
2006	NCAA (4)	Division II (4)	Chuck Martin	15–0 (10–0 GLIAC)	Northwest Missouri State	W, 17–14

== Postseason appearances ==
=== NCAA Division II playoffs ===
The Lakers have made twenty-four appearances in the NCAA Division II playoffs. Their combined record is 40–19, with four national championships.

Year	Round	Opponent	Result
1989	First Round	Indiana (PA)	L, 24–34
1990	First Round	East Texas State	L, 14–20
1991	First Round	East Texas State	L, 15–36
1994	First Round	Indiana (PA)	L, 27–35
1998	First Round	Slippery Rock	L, 14–37
2001	First Round; Quarterfinals; Semifinals; National Championship	Bloomsburg; Saginaw Valley State; Catawba; North Dakota	W, 42–14; W, 33–30; W, 34–16; L, 14–17
2002	First Round; Quarterfinals; Semifinals; National Championship	C.W. Post; Indiana (PA); Northern Colorado; Valdosta State	W, 63–13; W, 62–21; W, 44–7; W, 31–24
2003	First Round; Quarterfinals; Semifinals; National Championship	Bentley; Saginaw Valley State; Texas A&M–Kingsville; North Dakota	W, 65–36; W, 10–3; W, 31–3; W, 10–3
2004	First Round; Second Round; Quarterfinals	Winona State; Northwood; North Dakota	W, 16–13; W, 10–7; L, 15–19
2005	Second Round; Quarterfinals; Semifinals; National Championship	North Dakota; Saginaw Valley State; East Stroudsburg; NW Missouri State	W, 17–3; W, 24–17; W, 55–20; W, 21–17
2006	Second Round; Quarterfinals; Semifinals; National Championship	South Dakota; North Dakota; Delta State; NW Missouri State	W, 35–17; W, 30–20; W, 49–30; W, 17–14
2007	Second Round; Quarterfinals; Semifinals	North Dakota; Central Washington; NW Missouri State	W, 21–14; W, 41–21; L, 16–34
2008	Second Round; Quarterfinals	Ashland; Minnesota–Duluth	W, 40–7; L, 13–19 ^{2OT}
2009	Second Round; Quarterfinals; Semifinals; National Championship	Hillsdale; Minnesota–Duluth; Carson–Newman; NW Missouri State	W, 44–27; W, 24–10; W, 41–27; L, 23–30
2010	First Round; Second Round	Colorado Mines; Augustana (SD)	W, 35–13; L, 6–38
2013	First Round; Second Round; Quarterfinals; Semifinals	Saginaw Valley State; CSU Pueblo; West Texas A&M; NW Missouri State	W, 40–7; W, 34–30; W, 35–28; L, 13–27
2015	First Round; Second Round; Quarterfinals; Semifinals	Ashland; Ferris State; CSU Pueblo; Shepherd	W, 45–28; W, 38–34; W, 31–7; L, 32–34
2016	Second Round; Quarterfinals	Texas A&M–Commerce; Ferris State	W, 55–32; L, 32–47
2018	First Round	NW Missouri State	L, 17–42
2021	First Round; Second Round	Lindenwood; Ferris State	W, 20–3; L, 20–54
2022	Second Round; Quarterfinals	NW Missouri State; Ferris State	W, 13–8; L, 21–24
2023	First Round; Second Round; Quarterfinals	Ferris State; Pittsburg State; Harding	W, 21–14; W, 24–21; L, 6–7
2024	First Round; Second Round	Indianapolis; Harding	W, 24–7; L, 26–44
2026	First Round	Northwood	TBP

=== NAIA playoffs ===
The Lakers made one appearance in the NAIA playoffs, with a combined record of 1–1.

Year	Round	Opponent	Result
1978	Quarterfinals; Semifinals	Wisconsin–La Crosse; Elon	W, 24–14; L, 7–13

== NFL alumni ==
=== Current ===
- Matthew Judon – OLB – Baltimore Ravens, New England Patriots, Atlanta Falcons, Miami Dolphins
- Jahdae Walker - WR - Chicago Bears

Former:

- Brandon Carr – CB – Kansas City Chiefs, Dallas Cowboys, Baltimore Ravens
- Nick Keizer - TE - Baltimore Ravens, Kansas City Chiefs
- David Talley – LB – Green Bay Packers
- Charles Johnson – WR – Philadelphia Eagles
- Tim Lelito – OL – Detroit Lions
- Todd Carter - K -
- Dan Skuta – LB
- Nick McDonald – OL
- Cameron Bradfield – OL
- Josh Bourke – T (+ CFL)
- Eric Fowler – WR
- Matt Armstrong – C (+ AFL)
- David Kircus – WR
- Cullen Finnerty – QB
- Curt Anes – QB
- Brandon Barnes - OT
- Jeff Fox – QB
- Eric Lynch – RB
- Derrick Jones – DE
- Mike Sheldon – OL
- Rick Johnson – T
- Frank Miotke – WR
- Jeff Chadwick – WR
- Rob Rubick – TE
- Gary Evans - OT
- Ron Essink – OT
- Brandon Revenberg – OL – CFL – Hamilton Tiger Cats
