= Eric Fowler =

American football player (born 1984)

No. 18
- Position: Wide receiver

Personal information
- Born: October 17, 1984 (age 42); New Haven, Michigan, U.S.
- Listed height: 6 ft 3 in (1.91 m)
- Listed weight: 210 lb (95 kg)

Career information
- College: Grand Valley State
- NFL draft: 2007: undrafted

Career history
- Pittsburgh Steelers (2007)*; St. Louis Rams (2007–2008)*; Detroit Lions (2008–2009)
- * Offseason or practice squad member only

Awards and highlights
- First-team All-American (2006); First-team All-GLIAC (2006); Second-team All-GLIAC (2005)
- Stats at Pro Football Reference

Eric Fowler (born October 17, 1984) is an American former professional football player who was a wide receiver for the Detroit Lions of the National Football League (NFL). He was signed by the Pittsburgh Steelers as an undrafted free agent in 2007. He played college football for the Grand Valley State Lakers.

Fowler was also a member of the St. Louis Rams.

== Early life ==
Fowler attended New Haven High School in New Haven, Michigan and was a student and a letterman in football. In football, after his junior and senior seasons, he won All-Southern Thumb Association honors and All-County honors. Eric Fowler graduated from New Haven High School in 2002.

== Professional career ==
=== Pittsburgh Steelers ===
After being undrafted in the 2007 NFL draft, Fowler signed with the Pittsburgh Steelers on May 9, 2007. He was released on August 27.

=== St. Louis Rams ===
Fowler was signed to the St. Louis Rams' practice squad on December 12, 2007. He was released on December 13, 2007.

=== Detroit Lions ===
Fowler signed with the Detroit Lions on July 27, 2008. He was waived on July 30. He re-signed to the practice squad on August 31. He was released on November 19 and re-signed again on November 24. He was signed to the active roster on December 29.

Fowler was waived/injured on August 25, 2009, and subsequently reverted to injured reserve. On November 4, 2009, Fowler was re-signed to the practice squad after the Lions released Taurus Johnson. Fowler was waived by the Lions on December 12 and added to the practice squad on December 15. He was promoted to the active roster again on December 24 when the team waived long snapper Nathan Hodel.

Fowler was released by the Lions on August 30, 2010.
