= Frank Miotke =

American football player (born 1965)

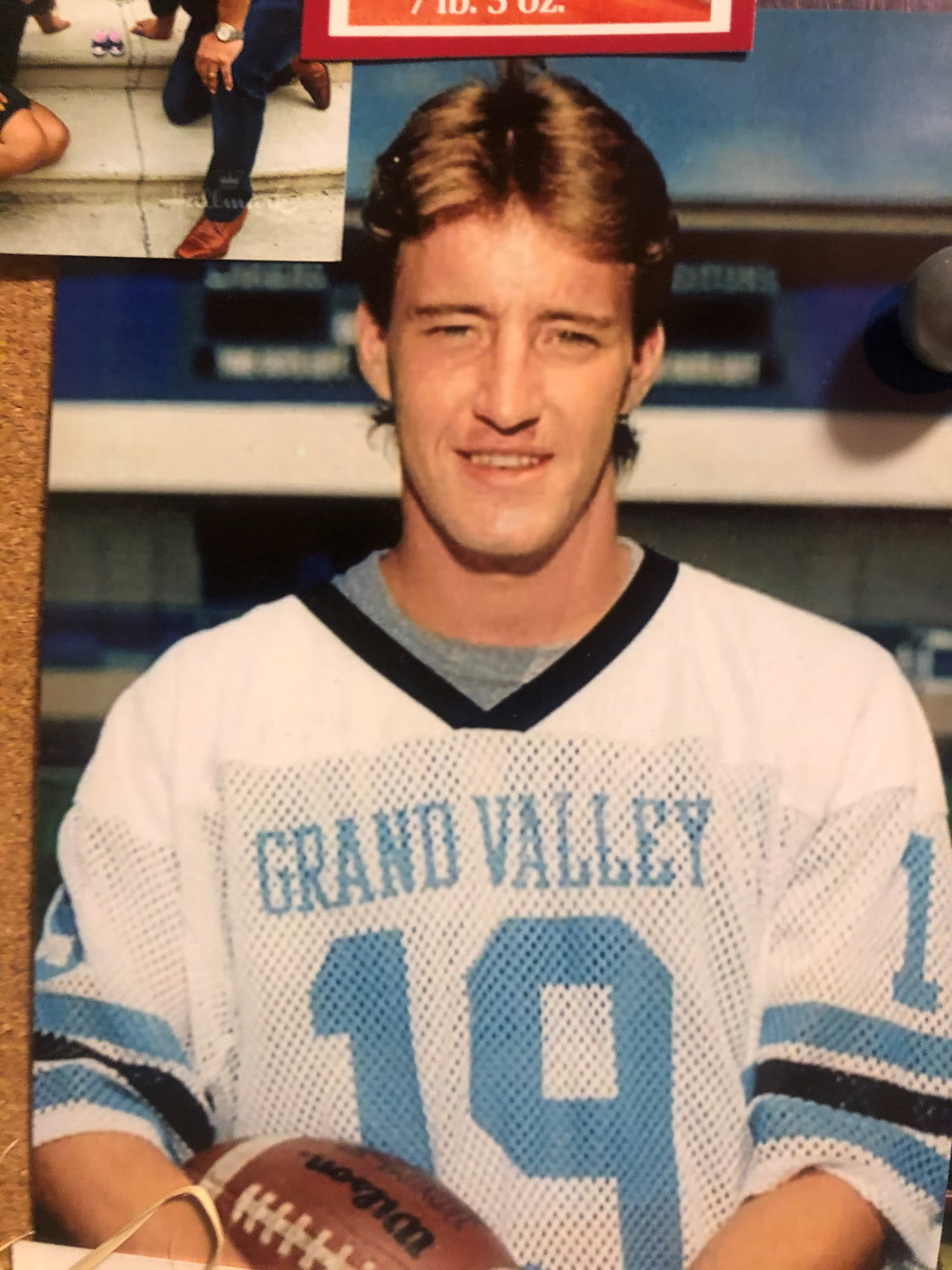
- Frank Miotke - Grand Valley State

No. 89
- Position: Wide receiver

Personal information
- Born: December 22, 1965 (age 60); Dearborn, Michigan, U.S.
- Listed height: 6 ft 0 in (1.83 m)
- Listed weight: 175 lb (79 kg)

Career information
- High school: Hartland (MI)
- College: Grand Valley State
- NFL draft: 1989: undrafted

Career history
- New York Giants (1989)*; Houston Oilers (1990)*; Houston Oilers (1991); Buffalo Bills (1992)*
- * Offseason or practice squad member only
- Stats at Pro Football Reference

Frank Miotke (born December 22, 1965) is an American former professional football player who was a wide receiver for the Houston Oilers of the National Football League (NFL) in 1991. He played college football for the Grand Valley State Lakers.

Franks currently plays men's league hockey in the BLH at The Pond Arena in Chagrin Falls Ohio. He is a member of The Swayzees Hockey Club, playing forward and wearing jersey #19.
