= Tim Lelito =

American football player (born 1989)

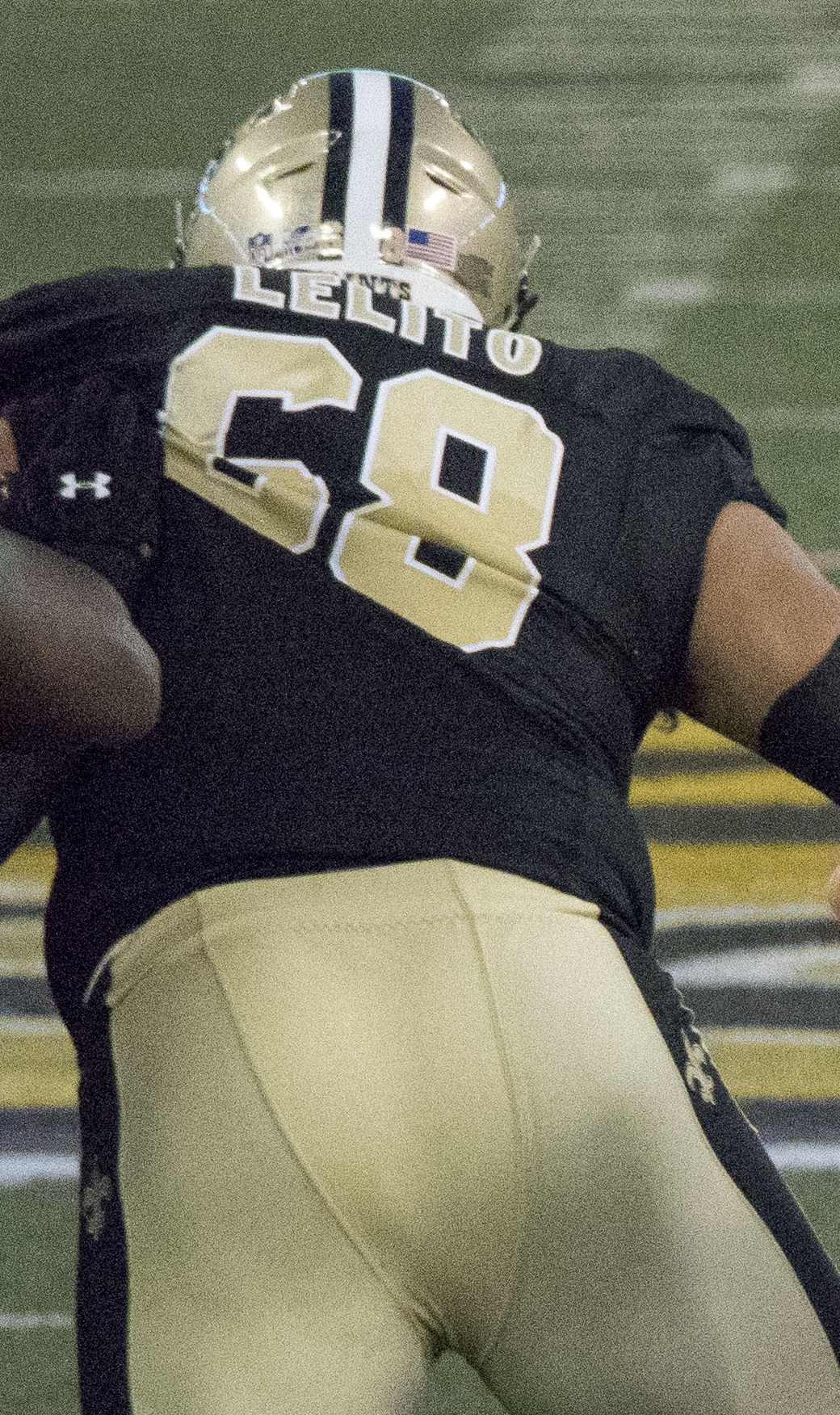
- Lelito with the New Orleans Saints in 2015

No. 68, 63
- Position: Offensive guard

Personal information
- Born: July 21, 1989 (age 37); Rochester, Michigan, U.S.
- Listed height: 6 ft 3 in (1.91 m)
- Listed weight: 335 lb (152 kg)

Career information
- High school: St. Clair (MI)
- College: Grand Valley State
- NFL draft: 2013: undrafted

Career history
- New Orleans Saints (2013–2016); Tennessee Titans (2017)*; Detroit Lions (2017)
- * Offseason or practice squad member only

Career NFL statistics
- Games played: 65
- Games started: 24
- Stats at Pro Football Reference

Tim Scott Lelito (born July 21, 1989) is an American former professional football player who was an offensive guard in the National Football League (NFL). He played college football for the Grand Valley State Lakers.

== Professional career ==
=== New Orleans Saints ===
On April 29, 2013, he signed with the New Orleans Saints as an undrafted free agent. In the third game of the season, against the Arizona Cardinals, Lelito started at right guard in place of longtime starter Jahri Evans, who had a hamstring injury and missed his first start in 122 games.

Lelito was named back-up center to Jonathan Goodwin for the 2014 season. When Goodwin injured his ankle in week 3 against the Minnesota Vikings he came on as a substitute and, due to the ensuing miscommunication, his first snap missed quarterback Drew Brees for an 18-yard loss but he played the rest of the game without incident as the Saints won 20–9.

=== Tennessee Titans ===
On March 22, 2017, Lelito was signed by the Tennessee Titans. He was released by the Titans on September 4, 2017.

=== Detroit Lions ===
On September 26, 2017, Lelito was signed by the Detroit Lions. On October 30, 2017, he was placed on injured reserve with a thigh injury. He was released by the Lions on November 7, 2017.
