= Cameron Bradfield =

American football player (born 1987)

No. 78
- Position: Offensive tackle

Personal information
- Born: September 14, 1987 (age 39); Grand Rapids, Michigan, U.S.
- Listed height: 6 ft 4 in (1.93 m)
- Listed weight: 301 lb (137 kg)

Career information
- High school: Creston (Grand Rapids)
- College: Grand Valley State
- NFL draft: 2011: undrafted

Career history
- Jacksonville Jaguars (2011–2014); Atlanta Falcons (2014); Arizona Cardinals (2015)*; Dallas Cowboys (2016)
- * Offseason or practice squad member only

Career NFL statistics
- Games played: 41
- Games started: 27
- Stats at Pro Football Reference

Cameron Bradfield (born September 14, 1987) is an American former professional football player who was an offensive tackle in the National Football League (NFL). He was signed by the Jacksonville Jaguars as an undrafted free agent in 2011. He played college football for the Grand Valley State Lakers.

== Early life ==
Bradfield attended Creston High School, where he was an All-city selection at tight end as a senior. He also played basketball.

He accepted a football scholarship from Grand Valley State University, where he was converted into an offensive lineman and became a three-year starter. He was named the starter at right tackle as a sophomore. He was named the starter at left tackle as a senior.

== Professional career ==
=== Jacksonville Jaguars ===
Bradfield was signed by the Jacksonville Jaguars as an undrafted free agent after the 2011 NFL draft. He spent three full seasons with the Jaguars as the team's swing tackle. In 2014, he started the first two games of the regular season in place of injured starting right tackle Austin Pasztor, before being waived on September 16.

=== Atlanta Falcons ===
Bradfield was signed by the Atlanta Falcons on September 30, 2014, after tackle Lamar Holmes was placed on the injured reserve list. He was released on November 28, in order to activate safety William Moore.

=== Arizona Cardinals ===
On January 1, 2015, Bradfield was signed to a reserve/future contract by the Arizona Cardinals. On September 5, he was released by the Cardinals.

=== Dallas Cowboys ===
On July 25, 2016, he was signed as a free agent by the Dallas Cowboys. He was placed on the injured reserve list with a knee injury on August 16.
