= Brandon Barnes (offensive lineman) =

American football player (born 1985)

No. 53
- Position: Offensive lineman

Personal information
- Born: February 28, 1985 (age 41); Detroit, Michigan, U.S.
- Listed height: 6 ft 2 in (1.88 m)
- Listed weight: 315 lb (143 kg)

Career information
- High school: Pershing (Detroit)
- College: Grand Valley State
- NFL draft: 2008: undrafted

Career history
- Baltimore Ravens (2008)*; Green Bay Blizzard (2009); Indianapolis Colts (2009)*; Milwaukee Iron (2010)
- * Offseason or practice squad member only

Awards and highlights
- Gene Upshaw Award (2007); 2× Division II All-American (2006–2007); 3× First-team All-GLIAC (2005–2007)
- Stats at ArenaFan.com

Brandon Barnes (born February 28, 1985) is an American former professional football player who was an offensive tackle in the National Football League (NFL). He was signed by the Baltimore Ravens as an undrafted free agent in 2008. He played college football for the Grand Valley State Lakers.

Barnes was also a member of the Green Bay Blizzard, Indianapolis Colts and Milwaukee Iron.
