= 2002 Grand Valley State Lakers football team =

American college football season

2002 Grand Valley State Lakers football

NCAA Division II champion GLIAC champion

NCAA Division II Championship Game, W 31–24 vs. Valdosta State
- Conference: Great Lakes Intercollegiate Athletic Conference

Ranking
- AFCA: No. 1
- Record: 14–0 (9–0 GLIAC)
- Head coach: Brian Kelly (12th season)
- Offensive coordinator: Jeff Quinn (14th season)
- Defensive coordinator: John Jancek (4th season)
- Home stadium: Lubbers Stadium

2002 Great Lakes Intercollegiate Athletic Conference football standings
	Conf.			Overall
Team	W		L	W		L
No. 1 Grand Valley State $^	9	–	0	14	–	0
No. 25 Findlay	8	–	2	9	–	2
No. 13 Saginaw Valley State ^	8	–	2	9	–	3
Northwood	7	–	3	7	–	4
Northern Michigan	6	–	4	6	–	5
Ferris State	4	–	5	5	–	5
Indianapolis	4	–	6	5	–	6
Hillsdale	4	–	6	4	–	7
Michigan Tech	3	–	7	3	–	7
Wayne State (MI)	3	–	7	3	–	8
Ashland	2	–	8	2	–	9
Mercyhurst	1	–	9	2	–	9
$ – Conference champion; ^ – NCAA Division II playoff participant; Rankings from AFCA poll

The 2002 Grand Valley State Lakers football team was an American football team that won the 2002 NCAA Division II national championship.

The team represented the Grand Valley State University in the Great Lakes Intercollegiate Athletic Conference (GLIAC) during the 2002 NCAA Division II football season. In their 12th season under head coach Brian Kelly, the Lakers compiled a 14–0 record (9–0 against conference opponents), outscored opponents by a total of 654 to 231, and won the GLIAC championship. The team advanced to the playoffs and won the national championship by defeating Valdosta State in the championship game.

David Kircus broke the school's single-season scoring records with 35 touchdowns and 212 points in 2002. The prior records had been set by Kirkus one year earlier. Reggie Spearman led the team with 1,500 rushing yards and 144 points (24 touchdowns) for Grand Valley in 2002. Terrance Banks also set a school single-season record with 98 receptions (good for 1,178 yards and six touchdowns). Curt Anes set a team record with 278 pass completions; he completed 278 of 414 passes (.671) for 3,692 yards and 47 touchdowns.

The team played its home games at Lubbers Stadium in Allendale Charter Township, Michigan.

== Schedule ==
Date	Time	Opponent	Rank	Site	Result	Attendance	Source
September 7	7:00 p.m.	No. 6 UC Davis*	No. 1	Lubbers Stadium; Allendale, MI	W 24–17	12,361	
September 14		at Ferris State	No. 1	Top Taggart Field; Big Rapids, MI	Canceled		
September 21	12:00 p.m.	at Wayne State (MI)	No. 1	Tom Adams Field; Detroit, MI	W 49–14	2,445	
September 28	7:00 p.m.	Hillsdale	No. 1	Lubbers Stadium; Allendale, MI	W 44–19	10,031	
October 5	12:00 p.m.	at Michigan Tech	No. 1	Sherman Field; Houghton, MI	W 56–14	2,056	
October 12	7:00 p.m.	Northern Michigan	No. 1	Lubbers Stadium; Allendale, MI	W 51–14	9,560	
October 19	12:00 p.m.	at No. 3 Saginaw Valley State	No. 1	Harvey Randall Wickes Memorial Stadium; Saginaw, MI (Battle of the Valleys)	W 23–18	11,234	
October 26	7:00 p.m.	Northwood	No. 1	Lubbers Stadium; Allendale, MI	W 33–14	6,544	
November 2	1:30 p.m.	at Mercyhurst	No. 1	Saxon Stadium; Erie, PA	W 62–24	300	
November 9	7:00 p.m.	Indianapolis	No. 1	Lubbers Stadium; Allendale, MI	W 50–13	6,064	
November 16	1:00 p.m.	No. 19 Findlay	No. 1	Lubbers Stadium; Allendale, MI	W 63–19	6,278	
November 23	1:00 p.m.	No. 10 C.W. Post*	No. 1	Lubbers Stadium; Allendale, MI (NCAA Division II first round)	W 62–13	4,233	
November 30	1:00 p.m.	No. 6 IUP*	No. 1	Lubbers Stadium; Allendale, MI (NCAA Division II quarterfinal)	W 62–21	3,705	
December 7	1:00 p.m.	No. 7 Northern Colorado*	No. 1	Lubbers Stadium; Allendale, MI (NCAA Division II semifinal)	W 44–7	5,215	
December 14	3:00 p.m.	vs. No. 2 Valdosta State*	No. 1	Braly Municipal Stadium; Florence, AL (NCAA Division II Championship Game)	W 31–24	9,783	
*Non-conference game; Rankings from American Football Coaches Association Poll released prior to the game; All times are in Eastern time
