= Todd Carter =

American football player (born 1986)

No. 5
- Position: Placekicker

Personal information
- Born: June 7, 1986 (age 40); Flint, Michigan, U.S.
- Listed height: 6 ft 1 in (1.85 m)
- Listed weight: 190 lb (86 kg)

Career information
- High school: Carman-Ainsworth (Flint Township, Michigan)
- College: Grand Valley State
- NFL draft: 2009: undrafted

Career history
- Carolina Panthers (2010); St. Louis Rams (2011)*; Kansas City Chiefs (2011)*
- * Offseason or practice squad member only
- Stats at Pro Football Reference

Todd Carter (born June 7, 1986) is an American former professional football player who was a placekicker in the National Football League (NFL). He was signed by Carolina Panthers as an undrafted free agent in 2010. He played college football for the Grand Valley State Lakers.

He was also a member of the St. Louis Rams and Kansas City Chiefs.

== Early life ==
He was born on June 7, 1986, to Ed and Ruth Carter in Flint, Michigan. Growing up, he preferred soccer to football, but in his senior year of high school at Carman-Ainsworth High School, "One of the football coaches was my math teacher. He had asked another soccer player in the class to kick, and the other kid was like, ‘Todd kicks the crap out of the ball,'" Carter said. "It just happened from there." Following his senior season, he was offered the opportunity to walk-on to either the University of Michigan football team or the Michigan State University football team, but instead opted to accept a scholarship to Grand Valley State University.

== College career ==
In college, Carter played for the Grand Valley State University football team from 2005 to 2008. As a true freshman in 2004, he was redshirted. In 2005, he was mostly a kickoff specialist for the team, before becoming the kicker on both field goals and extra points from 2006 to 2008. During his career, he converted 27 of 41 field goal attempts and 173 of 189 extra point attempts. Brandon Carr and Dan Skuta were both teammates of Carter's at both Grand Valley State and in high school at Carman-Ainsworth in Flint.

== Professional career ==
Pre-draft measurables
Height	Weight
6 ft 0 3/8 in (1.84 m)	190 lb (86 kg)
Values from Pro Day

=== Carolina Panthers ===
After going undrafted in the 2009 NFL draft, Carter spent the entire 2009 season out of football before being invited to a workout by the Carolina Panthers. He was signed on April 6, 2010, and made the roster as a kickoff specialist. Before being signed, he worked at Tropical Smoothie Cafe in Flint, Michigan, and tried out for the Panthers, as well as the Kansas City Chiefs, because he was tired of "being a bum." He made his NFL debut on September 13, against the New York Giants, but suffered from back spasms and was forced to leave the game. He was waived/injured the following day. After clearing waivers, he reverted to injured reserve and then received an injury settlement on September 20, making him a free agent.

=== St. Louis Rams ===
On August 5, 2011, Carter signed with the St. Louis Rams to be a "camp kicker," but he was waived on August 9.

=== Kansas City Chiefs ===
The Kansas City Chiefs, who had previously worked out Carter in March 2010 before he signed with the Panthers, claimed him off of waivers on August 10. However, he was waived on August 30, during the first wave of cuts. He currently resides in Flint, Michigan.
