= Mike Sheldon =

American football player (born 1973)

No. 68, 77
- Position: Offensive lineman

Personal information
- Born: June 8, 1973 (age 53); Hinsdale, Illinois, U.S.

Career information
- College: Grand Valley State
- NFL draft: 1995: undrafted

Career history
- Buffalo Bills (1995)*; Miami Dolphins (1996)*; Rhein Fire (1997); Miami Dolphins (1997–1999); Memphis Maniax (2001); Chicago Bears (2001)*
- * Offseason or practice squad member only

Awards and highlights
- All-World League (1997); All-XFL (2001)
- Stats at Pro Football Reference

Michael Joseph Sheldon (born June 8, 1973) is an American former professional football player who was an offensive lineman in the National Football League (NFL), the World League of American Football (WLAF), and the XFL. He played for the Miami Dolphins of the NFL, the Rhein Fire of the WLAF, and the Memphis Maniax of the XFL. Sheldon played collegiately at Grand Valley State University.
