= Nick McDonald =

American football player (born 1987)

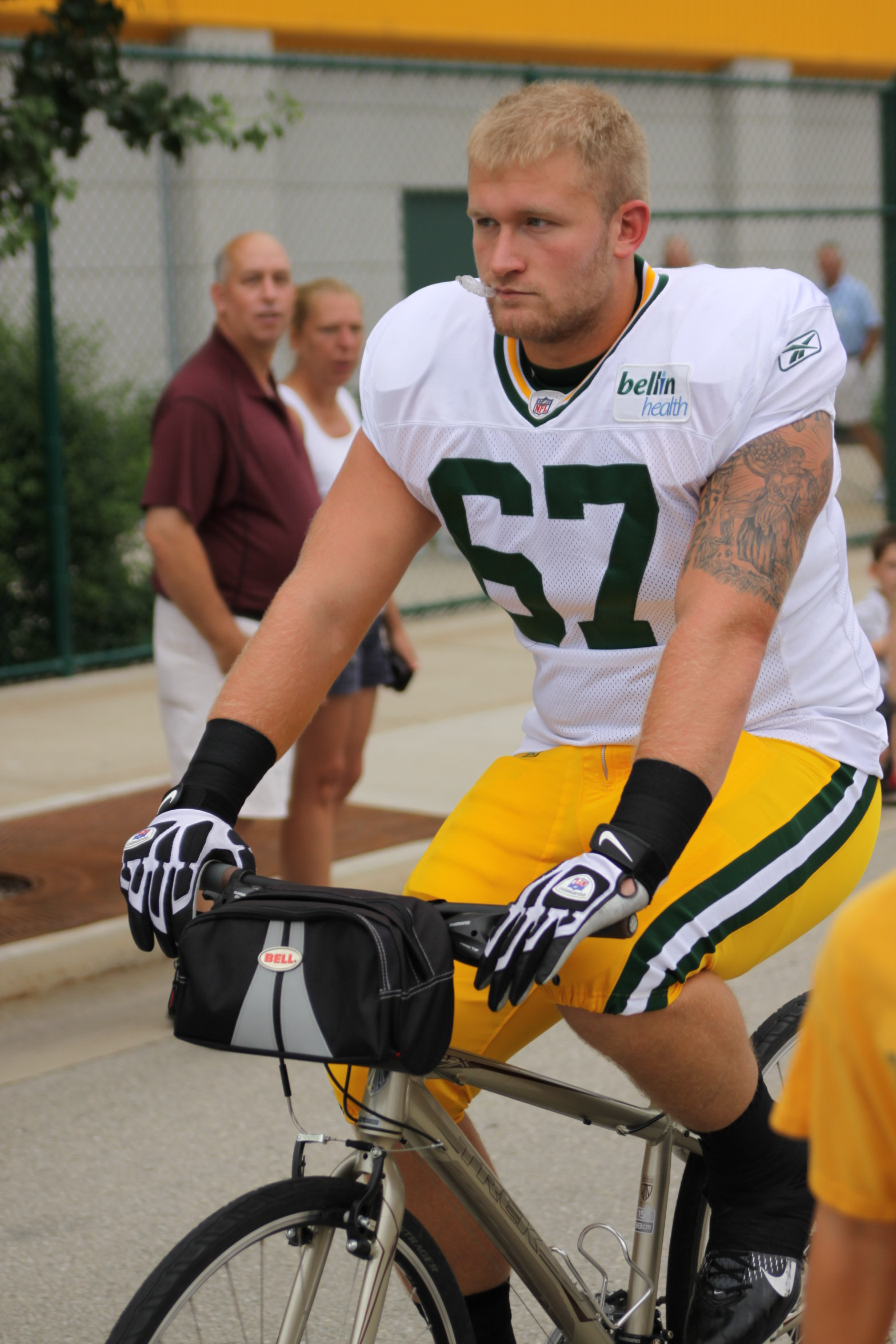
- McDonald with the Green Bay Packers in 2011

No. 65, 68
- Position: Center

Personal information
- Born: June 27, 1987 (age 39); Salinas, California, U.S.
- Listed height: 6 ft 4 in (1.93 m)
- Listed weight: 305 lb (138 kg)

Career information
- High school: Henry Ford II (Sterling Heights, Michigan)
- College: Grand Valley State University
- NFL draft: 2010: undrafted

Career history
- Green Bay Packers (2010); New England Patriots (2011–2012); San Diego Chargers (2014)*; Cleveland Browns (2014)
- * Offseason or practice squad member only

Awards and highlights
- Super Bowl champion (XLV); 2× Division II national champion (2005–2006)

Career NFL statistics
- Games played: 24
- Games started: 10
- Stats at Pro Football Reference

Nicholas James McDonald (born June 27, 1987) is an American former professional football player who was a center in the National Football League (NFL). He was signed as an undrafted free agent by the Green Bay Packers in 2010. In that year, he won Super Bowl XLV with the team against the Pittsburgh Steelers. McDonald played college football for the Grand Valley State Lakers.

== Professional career ==
=== Green Bay Packers ===
After going the 2010 NFL draft, McDonald signed with the Green Bay Packers on April 30, 2010.

McDonald was on the roster when the Packers won Super Bowl XLV over the Pittsburgh Steelers.

He was waived by the Packers on September 3, 2011.

=== New England Patriots ===
McDonald was signed to the New England Patriots' practice squad on September 4, 2011. He was released from the squad on September 15, but was re-signed the following day. On December 3, 2011, he was promoted to the active roster to replace the released Taylor Price. McDonald was part of the Patriots postseason team for Super Bowl XLVI but his hopes for a second straight championship came short when the Patriots lost the game to the New York Giants. On July 31, 2013, McDonald was waived by the New England Patriots.

=== San Diego Chargers ===
On January 16, 2014, McDonald signed a reserves/futures contract with the San Diego Chargers. On July 21, 2014, he was released.

=== Cleveland Browns ===
On July 22, 2014, McDonald was claimed by the Cleveland Browns. On May 27, 2015, he was released by the Browns.
