= David Kircus =

American gridiron football player (born 1980)

No. 11, 87, 80
- Position: Wide receiver

Personal information
- Born: February 19, 1980 (age 46); Mount Clemens, Michigan, U.S.
- Listed height: 6 ft 2 in (1.88 m)
- Listed weight: 192 lb (87 kg)

Career information
- High school: Imlay City (Imlay City, Michigan)
- College: Grand Valley State
- NFL draft: 2003: 6th round, 175th overall pick

Career history
- Detroit Lions (2003–2004); Denver Broncos (2006); Miami Dolphins (2008)*; Montreal Alouettes (2009)*; Las Vegas Locomotives (2009); Omaha Nighthawks (2010)*; Virginia Destroyers (2012)*
- * Offseason or practice squad member only

Awards and highlights
- UFL champion (2009); NCAA Division 2 national champion (2002); 2× Division II All-American (2001-2002); 2× First-team All-GLIAC (2001–2002); GLIAC Co-Offensive Player of the Year (2002); All-time All-division NCAA TD reception leader in a single season (35) and career (80)

Career NFL statistics
- Receptions: 15
- Receiving yards: 308
- Receiving touchdowns: 1
- Stats at Pro Football Reference

David R. Kircus (born February 19, 1980) is an American former professional football player who was a wide receiver in the National Football League (NFL). He was selected by the Detroit Lions in the sixth round of the 2003 NFL draft after playing college football for the Grand Valley State Lakers.

Kircus was also a member of the Detroit Lions, Denver Broncos, Miami Dolphins, Montreal Alouettes, Las Vegas Locomotives, Omaha Nighthawks and Virginia Destroyers.

== Early life ==
Kircus attended Imlay City High School in Imlay City, Michigan. He received All-Macomb Area Conference honors as a sophomore, junior and senior. He was the Detroit News All-State performer as a junior and senior and the three-time team captain. Kircus rushed for a combined 1,827 yards and scored 38 touchdowns as a junior and senior. He also caught 55 passes for 1,201 yards and 19 scores. He lettered in four sports in high school. Kircus was so focused on his athletic career that his mother often came into his Subway job after closing and helped him perform his closing duties

== College career ==
Kircus attended Grand Valley State University, where he was a member of the 2002 NCAA Division II Football Championship team. During his senior season in 2002, Kircus set a college record with 35 touchdown receptions in a single season. Kircus finished his collegiate career with an NCAA record 80 career touchdown receptions. He was twice named all-conference in the Great Lakes Intercollegiate Athletic Conference, and was twice named a Division II All-American.

Following his senior season, Kircus participated in the 2003 Hula Bowl, where he earned Most Valuable Player of the game as well as Offensive MVP scoring 2 touchdowns and over 100 yards receiving.

== Professional career ==
Kircus was selected in the 2003 NFL draft in the sixth round by the Detroit Lions. Kircus was a fan and hometown favorite. He played for the Lions during the 2003 and 2004 seasons, and training camp for the 2005 season. In 2004, Kircus caught a 50-yard touchdown pass from Lions quarterback Joey Harrington. He spent the 2005 regular season out of the NFL.

Kircus spent the 2006 with the Denver Broncos, where he recorded 9 receptions for 187 yards, and also returned 6 punts for 86 yards. He was active in all 16 games that season. He did not appear in a game during the 2007 NFL season after being released by the Broncos during training camp.

Kircus signed with the Miami Dolphins for the 2008 NFL season, but was released during training camp.

Kircus later signed with the Montreal Alouettes but was released on June 13, 2009.

In 2009 Kircus signed with the Las Vegas Locomotives of the United Football League, where he was the team's leading receiver. The Locomotives went on to win the 2009 UFL Championship Game.

Kircus signed with the Omaha Nighthawks for the 2010 UFL season. However, on September 18, 2010, he was released by the team following an arrest on misdemeanor charges outside a gas station in Rockford, Michigan. Kircus' misdemeanor charge was reduced due to an investigation proving he acted out of instinct on his September arrest that resulted in his release from the Nighthawks.

Kircus was a member of the Virginia Destroyers in 2012.

== Personal life ==
Nicknamed "Circus Kircus" by Grand Valley Lanthorn sports editor Michael Kohon for his acrobatic catches, he is the son of Anthony and Elaine Kircus. He grew up in Imlay City, The Gateway to the Thumb of Michigan.

After being cut by the Lions in 2005, Kircus was employed as a sandwich artist at a Subway in Howell, Michigan. The store, owned by a friend, allowed Kircus to remain in the Metro Detroit area while still pursuing his football career.

In May 2007, Kircus was involved in an early morning altercation with a man in Centennial, Colorado. Kircus, who claimed self-defense, was allowed to remain with the Broncos after taking a polygraph test. Originally charged with felony assault, Kircus instead pleaded guilty to a misdemeanor and was sentenced to 2 years probation. His release from the Broncos was unrelated to the incident according to head coach Mike Shanahan. Kircus filed for bankruptcy protection in 2010 as a result of continued compensation claims by the victim.

On September 15, 2010, Kircus was arrested at a gas station in Rockford, Michigan. He was charged with obstructing a police officer and driving with a suspended license.
