= Derrick Jones (defensive end) =

American football player (born 1984)

No. 99
- Position: Defensive end

Personal information
- Born: November 14, 1984 (age 41); Barstow, California, U.S.
- Listed height: 6 ft 4 in (1.93 m)
- Listed weight: 315 lb (143 kg)

Career information
- College: Grand Valley State
- NFL draft: 2007: undrafted

Career history
- Pittsburgh Steelers (2007)*; Atlanta Falcons (2007); Buffalo Bills (2008)*; Tennessee Titans (2008–2009)*; Buffalo Bills (2009)*; Miami Dolphins (2009)*; San Diego Chargers (2009–2010)*
- * Offseason or practice squad member only
- Stats at Pro Football Reference

Derrick Brandon Jones (born November 14, 1984) is an American former professional football defensive end. He was signed by the Pittsburgh Steelers as an undrafted free agent in 2007. He played college football at Grand Valley State.

Pre-draft measurables
| Height | Weight | 40-yard dash | 10-yard split | 20-yard split | 20-yard shuttle | Three-cone drill | Vertical jump | Broad jump | Bench press |
|---|---|---|---|---|---|---|---|---|---|
| 6 ft 3 7/8 in (1.93 m) | 282 lb (128 kg) | 4.74 s | 1.61 s | 2.70 s | 4.55 s | 7.34 s | 31.0 in (0.79 m) | 9 ft 11 in (3.02 m) | 24 reps |
All values from Pro Day

Jones was also a member of the Atlanta Falcons, Tennessee Titans, Buffalo Bills, Miami Dolphins and San Diego Chargers. He is a cousin of former Cincinnati Reds outfielder Eric Davis.
