= 2010 Notre Dame Fighting Irish football team =

American college football season

2010 Notre Dame Fighting Irish football

Sun Bowl champion

Sun Bowl, W 33–17 vs. Miami (FL)
- Conference: Independent
- Record: 8–5
- Head coach: Brian Kelly (1st season)
- Offensive coordinator: Charley Molnar (1st season)
- Offensive scheme: Spread
- Defensive coordinator: Bob Diaco (1st season)
- Base defense: 3–4
- MVP: Michael Floyd
- Captain: By Game
- Home stadium: Notre Dame Stadium

2010 NCAA Division I FBS independents football records
	Conf.			Overall
Team	W		L	W		L
Navy		–		9	–	4
Notre Dame		–		8	–	5
Army		–		7	–	6
Rankings from AP Poll

The 2010 Notre Dame Fighting Irish football team was an American football team that represented the University of Notre Dame as an independent during the 2010 NCAA Division I FBS football season. In their first year under head coach Brian Kelly, the Irish compiled an 8–5 record, outscored opponents by a total of 342 to 263, and were unranked in the final AP and Coaches Polls. They opened the season losing three of the first four games, but rebounded and won the final four games, including a 33–17 victory over unranked Miami (FL) in the Sun Bowl.

Wide receiver Michael Floyd tallied 79 receptions for 1,025 yards and 12 touchdowns and was selected by his teammates as the team's most valuable player. The team's other statistical leaders included quarterback Dayne Crist (2,033 passing yards), running back Cierre Wood (603 rushing yards), linebacker Manti Te'o (133 total tackles), and kicker David Ruffer (91 points scored, 37 of 40 extra points, 18 of 19 field goals).

The team played its home games at Notre Dame Stadium in Notre Dame, Indiana.

== Schedule ==
Date	Time	Opponent	Site	TV	Result	Attendance
September 4	3:30 p.m.	Purdue	Notre Dame Stadium; Notre Dame, IN (rivalry)	NBC	W 23–12	80,795
September 11	3:30 p.m.	Michigan	Notre Dame Stadium; Notre Dame, IN (rivalry)	NBC	L 24–28	80,795
September 18	8:00 p.m.	at Michigan State	Spartan Stadium; East Lansing, MI (rivalry)	ABC, ESPN2	L 31–34 ^{OT}	78,411
September 25	3:30 p.m.	No. 16 Stanford	Notre Dame Stadium; Notre Dame, IN (rivalry)	NBC	L 14–37	80,795
October 2	8:00 p.m.	at Boston College	Alumni Stadium; Chestnut Hill, MA (Holy War)	ABC	W 31–13	44,500
October 9	3:30 p.m.	Pittsburgh	Notre Dame Stadium; Notre Dame, IN (rivalry)	NBC	W 23–17	80,795
October 16	2:30 p.m.	Western Michigan	Notre Dame Stadium; Notre Dame, IN	NBC	W 44–20	80,795
October 23	12:00 p.m.	vs. Navy	New Meadowlands Stadium; East Rutherford, NJ (rivalry)	CBS	L 17–35	75,614
October 30	2:30 p.m.	Tulsa	Notre Dame Stadium; Notre Dame, IN	NBC	L 27–28	80,795
November 13	2:30 p.m.	No. 15 Utah	Notre Dame Stadium; Notre Dame, IN	NBC	W 28–3	80,795
November 20	7:00 p.m.	vs. Army	Yankee Stadium; Bronx, NY (Shamrock Series, rivalry)	NBC	W 27–3	54,251
November 27	8:00 p.m.	at USC	Los Angeles Memorial Coliseum; Los Angeles, CA (rivalry)	ABC	W 20–16	85,417
December 31	2:00 p.m.	vs. Miami (FL)	Sun Bowl; El Paso, TX (Sun Bowl) (rivalry)	CBS	W 33–17	54,021
Rankings from AP Poll released prior to the game; All times are in Eastern time

== Preseason ==
=== Coaching changes ===
Following the 2009 season, Notre Dame fired head coach Charlie Weis after the Irish finished 6-6, well below expectations of competing for a BCS bowl berth. Brian Kelly was named as his replacement on Dec 10, 2009. Running Backs coach Tony Alford was the lone assistant retained from Weis's staff. Before Rob Ianello could be considered, he took the head job at the University of Akron Ron Powlus followed Ianello to Akron.

=== Player departures ===
Irish stars Jimmy Clausen and Golden Tate chose to forgo their final years of eligibility and declare for the 2010 NFL draft. The Irish also lost a number of seniors to graduation, including linemen Eric Olsen, Paul Duncan and four-year starter Sam Young. Other notable losses included running back James Aldridge, wideout Robby Parris, and George West on offense. On defense, ND lost senior captains Kyle McCarthy and Scott Smith, Raeshon McNeil, Sergio Brown, John Ryan and Ray Herring to graduation. Standout special teams player Mike Anello also finished his final year of eligibility. Sophomore defensive back E.J Banks left the team in August 2010, but will still be enrolled at the school. On August 31, within days of the September 4 season opener against Purdue, sophomore wide receiver Shaquelle Evans was granted his release from the team, and decided to enroll at UCLA. Freshman Derek Roback also left the program in early September, as his desire to play quarterback led to his transfer to Ohio

=== Player additions ===
With his first recruiting class, Brian Kelly received 23 signed commitments from high school players across the United States. Among them was five early-enrollees: Quarterback Tommy Rees, Wide Receiver Tai-ler Jones, Cornerback Lo Wood, Cornerback Spencer Boyd and Safety Chris Badger. Spencer Boyd transferred to USF in early July, and Chris Badger left on a two-year Mormon mission to Ecuador in August. On April 2, 2010, Notre Dame recruit Matt James, who committed to Notre Dame on National Signing Day, died when he fell from a three-story hotel balcony in Panama City, Florida.

== Game summaries ==
=== Purdue ===
Shillelagh Trophy: Purdue Boilermakers (0–0) at Notre Dame Fighting Irish (0–0)

Quarter	1	2	3	4	Total
Purdue	0	3	0	9	12
Notre Dame	7	6	7	3	23

at Notre Dame Stadium • South Bend, Indiana

- Date: September 4
- Game time: 3:30 p.m.
- Game weather: Partly sunny • 64 °F (18 °C) • Wind NW 16 miles per hour (26 km/h; 14 kn)
- Game attendance: 80,795
- Referee: Dave Witovet
- TV announcers (NBC): Tom Hammond and Mike Mayock
- Box Score

Game information

Purdue

- Robert Marve
  31/42, 220 Yds, 2 INT
- Dan Dierking
  9 Rush, 56 Yds
- Keith Smith
  12 Rec, 80 Yds

Notre Dame

- Dayne Crist
  19/26, 205 Yds, TD
- Armando Allen
  18 Rush, 93 Yds, TD
- Michael Floyd
  5 Rec, 82 Yds

Brian Kelly's debut with Notre Dame

Scoring summary

Quarter	Time	Drive			Team	Scoring information	Score	
Quarter	Time	Plays	Yards	TOP	Team	Scoring information	PUR	ND
1	2:01	7	84	2:26	Notre Dame	Armando Allen 22-yard touchdown run, David Ruffer kick good	0	7
2	11:09	8	50	2:53	Notre Dame	22-yard field goal by David Ruffer	0	10
2	3:50	15	79	7:19	Purdue	25-yard field goal by Carson Wiggs	3	10
2	0:43	9	45	3:07	Notre Dame	46-yard field goal by David Ruffer	3	13
3	10:20	5	30	2:12	Notre Dame	TJ Jones 5-yard touchdown reception from Dayne Crist, David Ruffer kick good	3	20
4	14:48				Purdue	Armando Allen tackled in end zone for a safety by Ryan Kerrigan, Charlton Williams	5	20
4	11:55	7	55	2:53	Purdue	Robert Marve 23-yard touchdown run, Carson Wiggs kick good	12	20
4	4:30	10	39	3:47	Notre Dame	37-yard field goal by David Ruffer	12	23
"TOP" = time of possession. For other American football terms, see Glossary of American football.							12	23

=== Michigan ===
	1	2	3	4	Total
Wolverines	14	7	0	7	28
Fighting Irish	7	0	10	7	24

=== Michigan State ===
Megaphone Trophy: Notre Dame Fighting Irish (1–1) at Michigan State Spartans (2–0)

Quarter	1	2	3	4	OT	Total
Notre Dame	7	0	14	7	3	31
Michigan State	0	7	14	7	6	34

at Spartan Stadium • East Lansing, Michigan

- Date: September 18
- Game time: 8:00 p.m. EDT
- Game weather: Overcast • 61 °F (16 °C) • Wind N 5 miles per hour (8.0 km/h; 4.3 kn)
- Game attendance: 78,411
- Referee: Jerry McGinn
- TV announcers (ABC/ESPN2): Brad Nessler, Todd Blackledge, and Holly Rowe
- Box Score

Game information

Notre Dame

- Dayne Crist
  32/55, 369 Yds, 4 TD, INT
- Armando Allen
  13 Rush, 71 Yds
- Theo Riddick
  10 Rec, 128 Yds, TD

Michigan State

- Kirk Cousins
  23/33, 245 Yds, 2 TD, INT
- Le'Veon Bell
  17 Rush, 114 Yds, TD
- B.J. Cunningham
  7 Rec, 101 Yds, TD

Scoring summary

Quarter	Time	Drive			Team	Scoring information	Score	
Quarter	Time	Plays	Yards	TOP	Team	Scoring information	ND	MSU
1	5:28	9	80	2:24	Notre Dame	Michael Floyd 7-yard touchdown reception from Dayne Crist, David Ruffer kick good	7	0
2	2:22	7	94	3:17	Michigan State	Keshawn Martin 6-yard touchdown reception from Kirk Cousins, Dan Conroy kick good	7	7
3	14:20	2	74	0:35	Michigan State	Edwin Baker 56-yard touchdown run, Dan Conroy kick good	7	14
3	12:25	6	74	1:49	Notre Dame	Kyle Rudolph 10-yard touchdown reception from Dayne Crist, David Ruffer kick good	14	14
3	5:51	11	73	6:29	Michigan State	Le'Veon Bell 16-yard touchdown run, Dan Conroy kick good	14	21
3	1:29	11	77	4:16	Notre Dame	Theo Riddick 15-yard touchdown reception from Dayne Crist, David Ruffer kick good	21	21
4	13:20	5	52	1:29	Notre Dame	Michael Floyd 24-yard touchdown reception from Dayne Crist, David Ruffer kick good	28	21
4	7:43	4	56	2:12	Michigan State	B.J. Cunningham 24-yard touchdown reception from Kirk Cousins, Dan Conroy kick good	28	28
OT		4	9		Notre Dame	33-yard field goal by David Ruffer	31	28
OT		4	25		Michigan State	Charlie Gantt 29-yard touchdown reception from Aaron Bates	31	34
"TOP" = time of possession. For other American football terms, see Glossary of American football.							31	34

=== Stanford ===
	1	2	3	4	Total
#16 Cardinal	10	6	3	18	37
Fighting Irish	3	3	0	8	14

=== Boston College ===
	1	2	3	4	Total
Fighting Irish	21	3	7	0	31
Eagles	7	6	0	0	13

=== Pittsburgh ===
	1	2	3	4	Total
Panthers	3	0	7	7	17
Fighting Irish	7	10	3	3	23

=== Western Michigan ===
	1	2	3	4	Total
Broncos	7	10	0	3	20
Fighting Irish	7	20	14	3	44

=== Navy ===
	1	2	3	4	Total
Fighting Irish	3	7	0	7	17
Midshipmen	7	14	14	0	35

=== Tulsa ===
	1	2	3	4	Total
Golden Hurricane	12	6	7	3	28
Fighting Irish	13	7	7	0	27

=== Utah ===
	1	2	3	4	Total
#15 Utes	3	0	0	0	3
Fighting Irish	7	7	14	0	28

=== Army ===
Shamrock Series: Army Black Knights (6–4) vs. Notre Dame Fighting Irish (5–5)

Quarter	1	2	3	4	Total
Army	3	0	0	0	3
Notre Dame	0	17	10	0	27

at Yankee Stadium • Bronx, New York

- Date: November 20
- Game time: 7:00 p.m. EDT
- Game weather: Mostly cloudy • 48 °F (9 °C) • Wind N/NW 11 miles per hour (18 km/h; 9.6 kn)
- Game attendance: 54,251
- Referee: John McDaid
- TV announcers (NBC): Tom Hammond and Mike Mayock
- Automated ScoreBook

Game information

Army

- Trent Steelman
  2/7, 39 Yds, 2 INT
- Patrick Mealy
  6 Rush, 30 Yds
- Davyd Brooks
  1 Rec, 27 Yds

Notre Dame

- Tommy Rees
  13/20, 214 Yds, TD, INT
- Cierre Wood
  14 Rush, 88 Yds
- Tyler Eifert
  4 Rec, 78 Yds, TD

Notre Dame wore green jerseys

Scoring summary

Quarter	Time	Drive			Team	Scoring information	Score	
Quarter	Time	Plays	Yards	TOP	Team	Scoring information	ARMY	ND
1	2:10	17	78	8:45	Army	20-yard field goal by Alex Carlton	3	0
2	14:50	6	36	2:15	Notre Dame	47-yard field goal by David Ruffer	3	3
2	11:55	4	40	0:50	Notre Dame	Robert Hughes 1-yard touchdown run, David Ruffer kick good	3	10
2	8:01	5	71	2:17	Notre Dame	Tyler Eifert 31-yard touchdown reception from Tommy Rees, David Ruffer kick good	3	17
3	14:00				Notre Dame	Interception returned 42 yards for touchdown by Darrin Walls, David Ruffer kick good	3	24
3	5:23	6	16	2:25	Notre Dame	39-yard field goal by David Ruffer	3	27
"TOP" = time of possession. For other American football terms, see Glossary of American football.							3	27

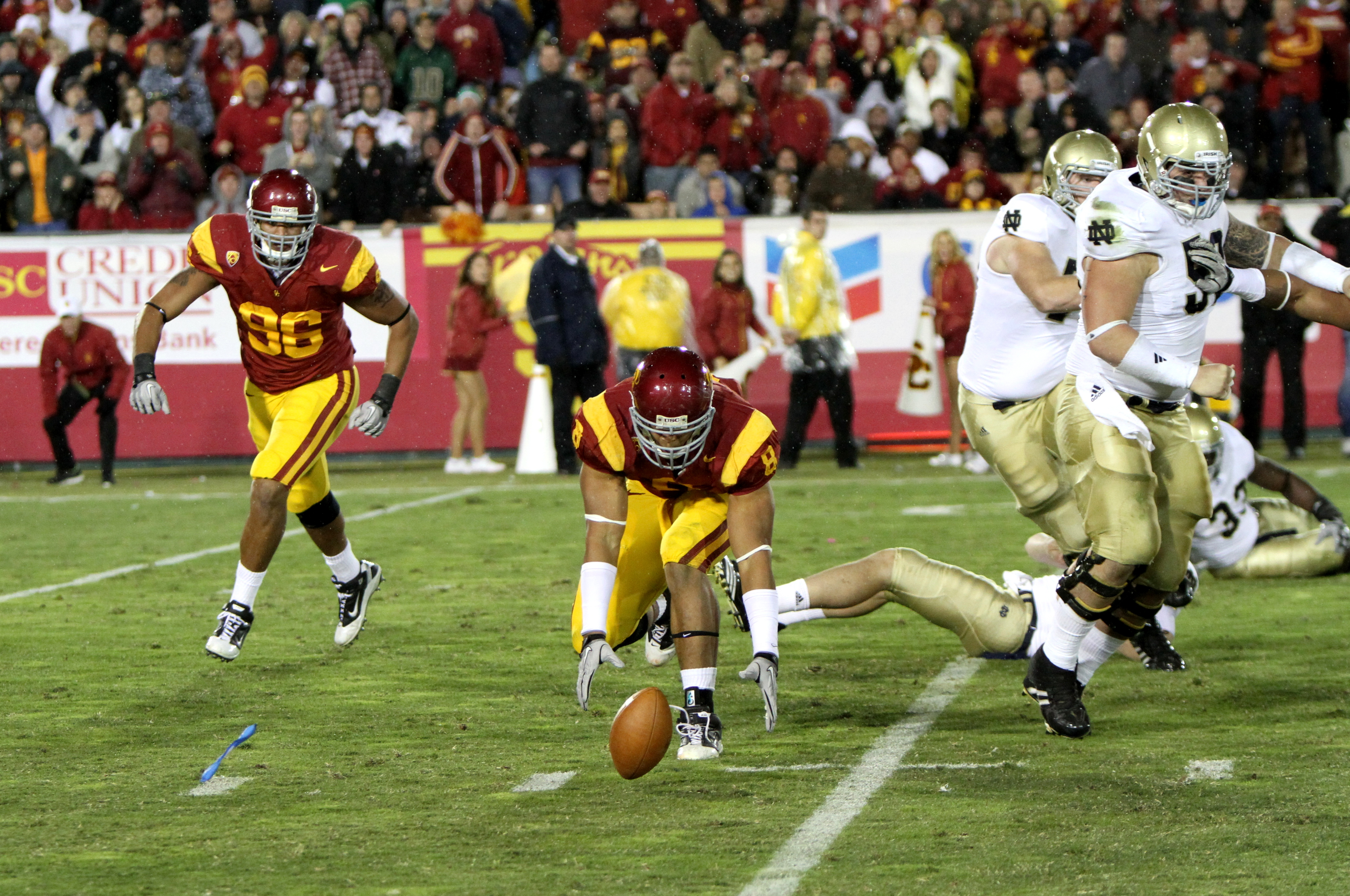
Notre Dame at USC, November 27

=== USC ===
Team	1	2	3	4	Total
• Notre Dame	0	13	0	7	20
USC	3	0	10	3	16

- Date: November 27
- Location: Los Angeles Memorial Coliseum, Los Angeles, CA
- Game start: 8:00 p.m. EST
- Game weather: Rain

Scoring summary
1	4:09	USC	Joe Houston 45-yard field goal	USC 3-0
2	2:39	ND	Michael Floyd 1-yard pass from Tommy Rees (David Ruffer kick)	ND 7-3
2	0:07	ND	Duval Kamara 1-yard pass from Tommy Rees (kick failed)	ND 13-3
3	11:02	USC	Joe Houston 23-yard field goal	ND 13-6
3	5:40	USC	Mitch Mustain 1-yard run (Joe Houston kick)	Tied 13-13
4	6:25	USC	Joe Houston 37-yard field goal	USC 16-13
4	2:23	ND	Robert Hughes 5-yard run (David Ruffer kick)	ND 20-16

On a rainy Southern California night, the Trojans' Joe Houston kicked a 45-yard field goal to give USC a first quarter lead. The second quarter, however, belonged to the Irish, as QB Tommy Rees completed a pair of 1-yard pass touchdowns to Michael Floyd and Duval Kamara, with Kamara's coming just before the half. David Ruffer missed the extra point on the second touchdown.

In the third quarter, the Trojans kicked a field goal and Mitch Mustain ran in for a 1-yard touchdown, which was aided by a Notre Dame fumble. Joe Houston's 37-yard field goal gave the Trojans a fourth quarter lead. But Notre Dame came back with a 5-yard rush touchdown by Robert Hughes to give the Irish the lead back and the game. Notre Dame finally ended USC's streak of consecutive victories, which dated back to 2001. USC's attempt to come back was stopped by a Notre Dame interception at the one-yard line.

=== Miami (FL) ===
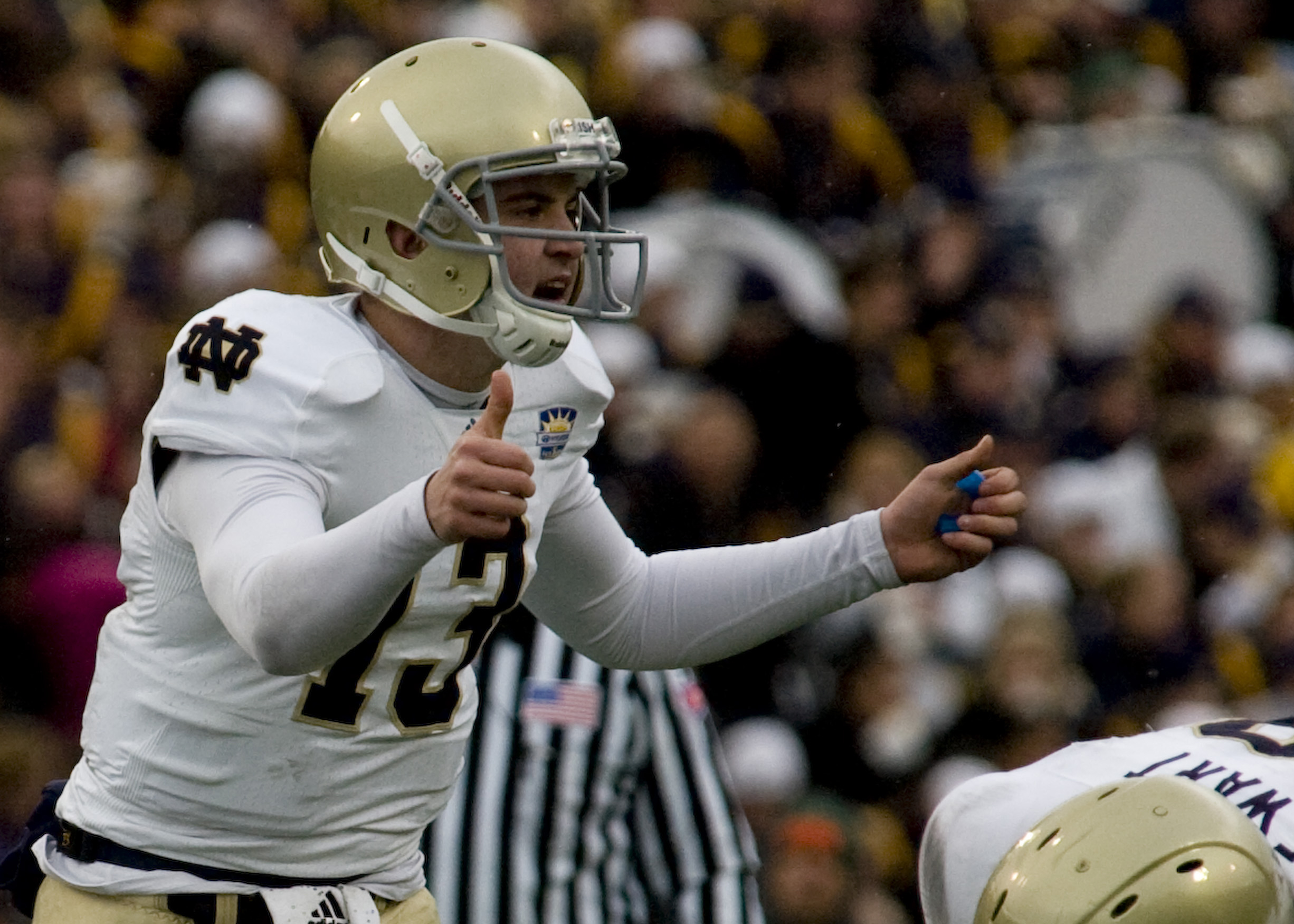
Tommy Rees calls an audible at the 2010 Sun Bowl.

Team	1	2	3	4	Total
• Notre Dame	14	13	3	3	33
Miami (FL)	0	3	0	14	17

- Date: December 31
- Location: Sun Bowl Stadium, El Paso, TX
- Game start: 2:00 p.m. EST
- Game weather: Cloudy
- TV announcers (CBS): Verne Lundquist, Gary Danielson and Tracy Wolfson

Scoring summary
1	11:02	ND	Michael Floyd 3-yard pass from Tommy Rees (David Ruffer kick)	ND 7-0
1	4:35	ND	Michael Floyd 34-yard pass from Tommy Rees (David Ruffer kick)	ND 14-0
2	13:21	ND	Cierre Wood 34-yard run (David Ruffer kick)	ND 21-0
2	4:50	ND	David Ruffer 40-yard field goal	ND 24-0
2	0:27	ND	David Ruffer 50-yard field goal	ND 27-0
2	0:00	MIA	Matt Bosher 47-yard field goal	ND 27-3
3	7:12	ND	David Ruffer 19-yard field goal	ND 30-3
4	10:36	MIA	Leonard Hankerson 6-yard pass from Stephen Morris (Matt Bosher kick)	ND 30-10
4	4:01	MIA	Tommy Streeter 42-yard pass from Stephen Morris (Matt Bosher kick)	ND 30-17
4	1:21	ND	Nick Tausch 34-yard field goal	ND 33-17

Tommy Rees passed for 201 yards and two touchdowns to Michael Floyd as Notre Dame beat Miami 33–17. After a 20-year hiatus in the series, it was all Irish in the latest installment of a storied rivalry that became known during the 1980s as "Catholics versus Convicts." The Irish reached the end zone on three of its first four possessions. Rees tossed TD passes of 3 and 34 yards to Floyd and Cierre Wood broke free on a 34-yard scoring run. David Ruffer added field goals from 40, 50 and 19 yards. The Irish defense picked off Miami starting quarterback Jacory Harris 3 times and logged 4 total interceptions in the first half to help the team jump out to a 27–0 lead in the first half. The Hurricanes tried to rally in the 4th quarter behind backup quarterback Stephen Morris, who threw a 6-yard touchdown to Leonard Hankerson and a 42-yard scoring play to Tommy Streeter, but it was too late by then. Rees was able to make some key first downs to effectively run out the clock late in the 4th quarter. The game sold out in 21 hours, the fastest in the Sun Bowl's 77-year history, and the crowd of 54,021 set a bowl attendance record. Floyd's two touchdowns pushed him past Jeff Samardzija and Golden Tate to claim 28 career touchdowns, the most in Irish history. Senior safety Harrison Smith logged three interceptions in the first half, tying the Sun Bowl record. The Irish victory also made Brian Kelly the first Fighting Irish coach to win a bowl game in his first season (Notre Dame did not play in bowl-games from the 1925 through 1968 seasons due to a self-imposed ban on post-season play).

== Personnel ==
2010 Notre Dame Fighting Irish football team roster
Players
Coaches
Offense

Pos.	#	Name	Class
WR	1	Deion Walker	Jr
WR	3	Michael Floyd	Jr
RB	5	Armando Allen Jr.	Sr
WR	6	Theo Riddick	So
WR	7	TJ Jones	Fr
TE	9	Kyle Rudolph	Jr
QB	10	Dayne Crist	Jr
QB	12	Andrew Hendrix	Fr
QB	13	Tommy Rees	Fr
QB	14	Luke Massa	Fr
QB	15	Brian Castello	Sr
QB	16	Nate Montana	Jr
QB	17	Matthew Mulvey	Jr
WR	18	Duval Kamara	Sr
WR	19	Robby Toma	So
RB	20	Cierre Wood	So
WR	21	Barry Gallup Jr.	Sr
RB	25	Jonas Gray	Jr
RB	27	Derry Herlihy	Sr
WR	28	Austin Collinsworth	Fr
RB	29	Patrick Coughlin	Sr
RB	31	Cameron Roberson	Fr
RB	33	Robert Hughes	Sr
WR	38	Christopher Gurries	Sr
TE	41	Bobby Burger	Sr
WR	42	Dan Franco	Sr
C	51	Dan Wenger	Sr
C	52	Braxston Cave	Jr
C	57	Mike Golic Jr.	Jr
G	59	Chris Stewart	Sr
C	62	Bill Flavin	Sr
OT	64	Tate Nichols	Fr
G	65	Mike Hernandez	Jr
G	66	Chris Watt	So
OT	70	Zack Martin	So
OT	71	Dennis Mahoney	Jr
OT	72	Alex Bullard	So
OT	73	Lane Clelland	Jr
OT	74	Christian Lombard	Fr
OT	75	Taylor Dever	Sr
G	76	Andrew Nuss	Sr
OT	77	Matt Romine	Sr
G	78	Trevor Robinson	Jr
TE	80	Tyler Eifert	So
WR	81	John Goodman	Jr
TE	82	Alex Welch	Fr
TE	83	Mike Ragone	Sr
WR	86	Bennett Jackson	Fr
WR	87	Daniel Smith	Fr
TE	88	Jake Golic	So

Defense

Pos.	#	Name	Class
CB	2	Darrin Walls	Sr
CB	4	Gary Gray	Sr
MLB	5	Manti Teʻo	So
MLB	8	Kendall Moore	Fr
CB	12	Robert Blanton	Jr
OLB	13	Danny Spond	Fr
S	15	Dan McCarthy	Jr
S	17	Zeke Motta	So
S	22	Harrison Smith	Sr
CB	23	Lo Wood	Fr
S	26	Jamoris Slaughter	Jr
CB	27	E.J. Banks	So
CB	29	Michael Garcia	Sr
MLB	30	Steve Paskorz	Sr
CB	30	James Redshaw	Sr
S	33	Chris Salvi	Jr
CB	35	Andrew Plaska	Jr
MLB	36	David Posluszny	Jr
CB	39	Ryan Sheehan	Sr
S	40	Thomas Smith	Sr
CB	42	Nick Lezynski	Sr
MLB	44	Carlo Calabrese	So
OLB	45	Darius Fleming	Jr
OLB	46	Steve Filer	Jr
OLB	48	Dan Fox	So
S	49	Derek Roback	Fr
MLB	50	Sean Oxley	Jr
OLB	53	Justin Utupo	Fr
MLB	54	Anthony McDonald	Jr
MLB	55	Prince Shembo	Fr
OLB	56	Kerry Neal	Sr
OLB	58	Brian Smith	Sr
DE	61	Martin Quintana	Sr
DE	62	Christopher Skubis	Sr
OLB	63	Steve Botsford	Sr
NT	67	Louis Nix	Fr
DE	89	Kapron Lewis-Moore	Jr
DE	90	Ethan Johnson	Jr
DE	91	Emeka Nwankwo	Sr
NT	92	Tyler Stockton	So
DE	93	Bruce Heggie	Fr
NT	94	Hafis Williams	Jr
NT	95	Ian Williams	Sr
DE	96	Kona Schwenke	Fr
DT	98	Sean Cwynar	Jr
NT	99	Brandon Newman	Jr

Special teams

Pos.	#	Name	Class
P	35	Ben Turk	So
P	37	Mike Grieco	Jr
K	40	Nick Tausch	So
LS	50	Ryan Kavanagh	Jr
LS	60	Jordan Cowart	So
LS	68	John Belcher	Sr
K	96	Brandon Walker	Sr
K	97	David Ruffer	Sr

Head coach

- Brian Kelly

Coordinators/assistant coaches

- Bob Diaco – Defensive Coordinator/Inside Linebackers
- Paul Longo – Director of Football Strength and Conditioning
- Charley Molnar – Offensive Coordinator/Quarterbacks
- Tony Alford – Wide Receivers
- Kerry Cooks – Outside Linebackers
- Mike Denbrock – Tight Ends
- Mike Elston – Defensive Line/Special Teams Coordinator
- Tim Hinton – Running Backs
- Chuck Martin – Defensive Backs/Recruiting Coordinator
- Ed Warinner – Offensive Line
- Scott Booker – Offensive Intern
- Bill Brechin – Offensive Intern
- Jon Carpenter – Defensive Graduate Assistant
- Michael Painter – Defensive Graduate Assistant
- Tim Collins – Video Coordinator
- Julie DeBuysser – Senior Staff Assistant-Offensive Coaches
- Karen Demeter – Senior Staff Assistant, Recruiting
- Reuel Joaquin – Assistant Video Coordinator
- Ann Karwoski – Senior Staff Assistant-Defensive Coaches
- Chad Klunder – Director of Football Operations
- Tim McDonnell – Director of Football Personnel
- David Peloquin – Director of Football Development
- Beth Rex – Director of Football Administration
- Joy Schosker – Senior Staff Assistant

Legend

- (C) Team captain
- (S) Suspended
- (I) Ineligible
- Injured
- Redshirt

Roster

== Statistics ==
Passing

1. Dayne Crist - 174 of 294 (59.2%) for 2,033 yards, 15 touchdowns, 7 interceptions, 129.3 passer rating
2. Tommy Rees - 100 of 164 (61.0%) for 1,106 yards, 12 touchdowns, 8 interceptions, 132.0 passer rating
3. Nate Montana - 9 of 18 (50.0%) for 116 yards, 0 touchdowns, 1 interception, 93.0 passer rating

Rushing

1. Cierre Wood - 603 yards on 119 carries, 5.1-yard average, 3 touchdowns
2. Armando Allen - 514 yards on 107 carries, 4.8-yard average, 2 touchdowns
3. Robert Hughes - 300 yards on 68 carries, 4.4-yard average, 2 touchdowns
4. Jonas Gray - 100 yards on 20 carries, 5.0-yard average, 0 touchdowns
5. Dayne Crist - 74 yards on 52 carries, 1.4-yard average, 4 touchdowns

Receiving

1. Michael Floyd (WR) - 79 receptions for 1,025 yards, 13.0-yard average, 12 touchdowns
2. Theo Riddick (WR) - 40 receptions for 414 yards, 10.4-yard average, 3 touchdowns
3. Tyler Eifert (TE) - 27 receptions for 352 yards, 13.0-yard average, 2 touchdowns
4. Kyle Rudolph (TE) - 28 receptions for 328 yards, 11.7-yard average, 3 touchdowns
5. T.J. Jones (WR) - 23 receptions for 306 yards, 12.2-yard average, 3 touchdowns
6. Robby Toma (WR) - 14 receptions for 187 yards, 13.4-yard average, 0 touchdowns
7. Cierre Wood (RB) - 20 receptions for 170 yards, 8.5-yard average, 2 touchdowns
8. John Goodman (WR) - 15 receptions for 146 yards, 9.7-yard average, 0 touchdowns
9. Armando Allen (RB) - 17 receptions for 138 yards, 8.1-yard average, 0 touchdowns

Scoring

1. David Ruffer (K) - 91 points, 37 of 40 PAT, 18 of 19 field goals
2. Michael Floyd (WR) - 72 points, 12 touchdowns
3. Cierre Wood (RB) - 30 points, 5 touchdowns
4. Dayne Crist (QB) - 24 points, 4 touchdowns

Tackles

1. Manti Te'o (LB) - 133 total tackles, 66 solo tackles
2. Harrison Smith (DB) - 91 total tackles, 55 solo tackles
3. Gary Gray (DB) - 66 total tackles, 48 solo tackles
4. Kapron Lewis-Moore - 62 total tackles, 20 solo tackles
5. Carlo Calabrese (LB) - 62 total tackles, 29 solo tackles
6. Robert Blanton (DB) - 53 total tackles, 29 solo tackles
7. Zeke Motta (DB) - 50 total tackles, 30 solo tackles
8. Brian Smith (LB) - 50 total tackles, 22 solo tackles
9. Darius Fleming (LB) - 48 total tackles, 27 solo tackles, 10.5 tackles for loss, 5.5 sacks

== Awards and honors ==
Wide receiver Michael Floyd, who tallied 79 receptions for 1,025 yards and 12 touchdowns, was selected by his teammates as the team's most valuable player.

No Notre Dame players received first-team honors on the 2010 All-America college football team.

Linebacker Manti Te'o received second-team All-America honors from Sports Illustrated.

Kicker David Ruffer was a finalist for the Lou Groza Award and received second-team All-America honors from Sports Illustrated and third-team honors from Rivals.com.
