= 2010 Sun Bowl =

American college football game

2010 Hyundai Sun Bowl
- 77th Sun Bowl
Notre Dame Fighting Irish	Miami Hurricanes
(7–5)	(7–5)
Independent	ACC
33	17
Head coach: Brian Kelly	Head coach: Jeff Stoutland
	1	2	3	4	Total
Notre Dame	14	13	3	3	33
Miami	0	3	0	14	17
- Date: December 31, 2010
- Season: 2010
- Stadium: Sun Bowl
- Location: El Paso, Texas
- Favorite: Miami (FL) by 3
- National anthem: Lee Greenwood
- Referee: Matt Austin (SEC)
- Attendance: 54,021
- Payout: US$1,900,000 per team

United States TV coverage
- Network: CBS
- Announcers: Verne Lundquist, Gary Danielson and Tracy Wolfson

The 2010 Hyundai Sun Bowl game was the 77th edition of the annual college football bowl game known as the Sun Bowl. It was played on December 31, 2010, between the Miami Hurricanes from the ACC and the independent Notre Dame Fighting Irish, in a revival of a long-dormant rivalry. CBS television broadcast the 2 p.m. (ET) game. Hyundai took over as the title sponsor. Bernie Olivas is its executive director.

== Team selection ==
=== Notre Dame Fighting Irish ===
The Irish improved from a 4–5 start to receive their first ever Sun Bowl appearance. An impressive November showing boasted victories over #15 Utah and against rival USC in Los Angeles.

=== Miami Hurricanes ===
What looked to be a second strong season in a row was derailed by late season losses to Virginia and South Florida. The losses would cost head coach Randy Shannon his job. Offensive line coach Jeff Stoutland had taken over coaching duties for the Sun Bowl. Miami's strength has been its defense, as the Canes rank No. 2 nationally in pass defense, No. 6 in sacks and No. 1 in tackles for loss. They were making their first-ever appearance in the Sun Bowl.

== Game notes ==
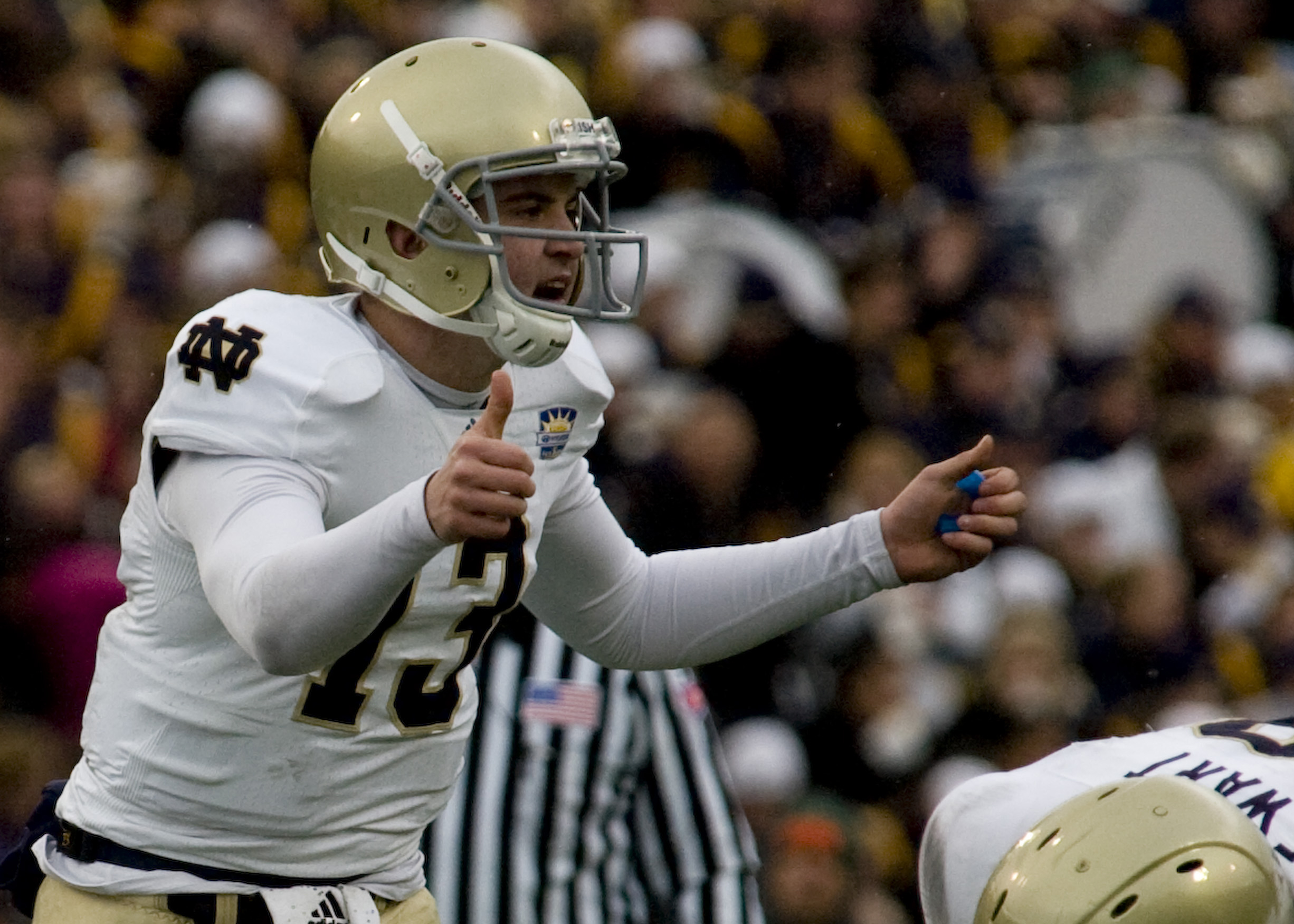
Tommy Rees calls an audible

The Sun Bowl marked the 24th meeting between the two schools. Notre Dame held a 15–7–1 advantage in the prior matchups. The last meeting between the two was a 29–20 Notre Dame victory in 1990. This was the first ever postseason bowl meeting between the Irish and the Hurricanes. The game sold out in 21 hours, the fastest in the Sun Bowl's 77-year history, and the crowd of 54,021 set a bowl attendance record, despite the temperature being below freezing.

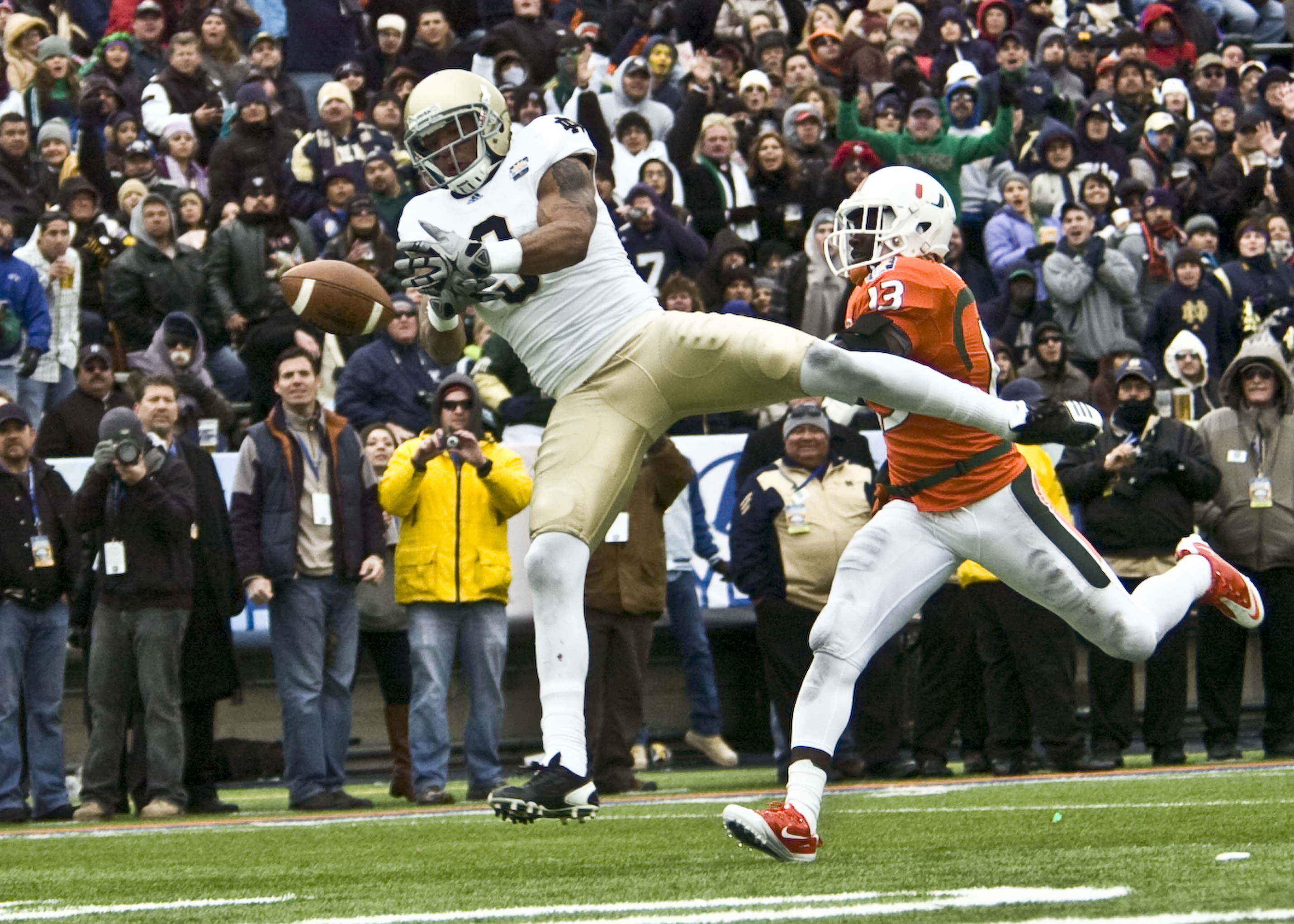
Michael Floyd battles a Miami defensive back for position

Tommy Rees passed for 201 yards and two touchdowns to Michael Floyd as Notre Dame beat Miami 33–17 The Irish reached the end zone on three of its first four possessions. Rees tossed TD passes of 3 and 34 yards to Floyd and Cierre Wood broke free on a 34-yard scoring run. David Ruffer added field goals from 40, 50 and 19 yards. The Irish defense picked off Miami starting quarterback Jacory Harris 3 times and logged 4 total interceptions in the first half to help the team jump out to a 27–0 lead in the first half. The Hurricanes tried to rally in the 4th quarter behind backup quarterback Stephen Morris, who threw a 6-yard touchdown to Leonard Hankerson and a 42-yard scoring play to Tommy Streeter, but it was too late by then. Rees was able to make some key first downs to effectively run out the clock late in the 4th quarter.

== Game summary ==
=== Scoring summary ===
Scoring play	Score
1st quarter
ND – Michael Floyd 3-yard pass from Tommy Rees (David Ruffer kick), 11:02	ND 7–0
ND – Michael Floyd 34-yard pass from Tommy Rees (David Ruffer kick), 4:35	ND 14–0
2nd quarter
ND – Cierre Wood 34-yard run (David Ruffer kick), 13:21	ND 21–0
ND – David Ruffer 40-yard field goal, 4:50	ND 24–0
ND - David Ruffer 50-yard field goal, 0:27	ND 27–0
MIA - Matt Bosher 47-yard field goal, 0:00	ND 27–3
3rd quarter
ND – David Ruffer 19-yard field goal, 7:12	ND 30–3
4th quarter
MIA – Leonard Hankerson 6-yard pass from Stephen Morris (Matt Bosher kick), 10:36	ND 30–10
MIA – Tommy Streeter 42-yard pass from Stephen Morris (Matt Bosher kick), 4:01	ND 30–17
ND – Nick Tausch 34-yard field goal, 1:21	ND 33–17
