= Charley Molnar =

American football coach (born 1961)

Current position
- Title: Quarterbacks coach
- Team: Carroll (MT)
- Conference: Frontier

Biographical details
- Born: July 23, 1961 (age 65); Morris Plains, New Jersey, U.S.
- Education: Lock Haven University

Coaching career (HC unless noted)
- 1984–1986: Lock Haven (RB/WR/TE/K)
- 1987–1988: Virginia (GA)
- 1989: Western Carolina (QB)
- 1990–1993: Illinois State (OC/QB/WR)
- 1994–2000: Kent State (OC/QB/WR)
- 2001: Eastern Illinois (WR)
- 2002: Eastern Michigan (QB)
- 2003–2004: Western Michigan (QB)
- 2005: Indiana State (AHC/OC/QB)
- 2006: Central Michigan (PGC/QB/WR)
- 2007–2009: Cincinnati (PGC/WR)
- 2010–2011: Notre Dame (OC/QB)
- 2012–2013: UMass
- 2014–2015: Idaho (WR)
- 2016–2021: Idaho (QB)
- 2022: New Mexico Highlands (AHC/OC/QB)
- 2023–present: Carroll (MT) (QB)

Head coaching record
- Overall: 2–22

Charley Molnar Jr. (born July 23, 1961) is an American college football coach. Molnar served head football coach at the University of Massachusetts Amherst (UMass), for two seasons, from 2012 to 2013, compiling a record of 2–22. Molnar had previously been the offensive coordinator at the University of Notre Dame.

== Coaching career ==
=== Early positions ===
Molnar began his coaching career at his alma mater Lock Haven University from 1984 to 1986, working with the wide receivers, tight ends, running backs and placekickers. He made his first entry into major college football as a graduate assistant at Virginia from 1987 to 1988. While with the Cavaliers, he assisted the quarterbacks coach. Molnar then called the offensive plays and coached quarterbacks at Western Carolina in 1989. He spent time as offensive coordinator as well as working with quarterbacks and wide receivers at Illinois State from 1990 to 1993, followed by seven seasons in the same capacity at Kent State from 1994 to 2000. Molnar coached quarterbacks at Eastern Michigan in 2002 and then from 2003 to 2004 at Western Michigan. He directed another record-setting quarterback during his only season at Indiana State in 2005. As the associate head coach and offensive coordinator of the Sycamores, Molnar’s offense broke six school passing records (including passing yards, completion percentage and touchdown passes) and two of his players combined to break 11 single-season or single-game school marks.

=== Central Michigan ===
Molnar coached the quarterbacks and wide receivers at Central Michigan under head coach Brian Kelly and developed the most prolific freshman quarterback and wide receiver duo in the nation in 2006. Dan LeFevour was named Mid-American Conference (MAC) Freshman of the Year and was selected first-team all-MAC after he led the conference in passing touchdowns, passing yards, passing efficiency, completion percentage, total completions and total yards. Under Molnar’s tutelage, LeFevour completed 247 of 388 pass attempts for 3,031 yards with 26 touchdowns. He also rushed 132 times for 521 yards and seven touchdowns and ranked 13th nationally in total offense (253.7 yards per game). LeFevour set school records for passing yards and touchdown passes, and his 3,552 total yards also were a Central Michigan record. He finished his rookie campaign ranked 19th nationally in passing efficiency.

=== Cincinnati ===
From 2007 to 2009, Molnar followed coach Brian Kelly to Cincinnati and continued to help develop record-breaking quarterbacks and wide receivers. With the Bearcats, Molnar was passing game coordinator and coached the wide receivers. He oversaw the two most prolific passing seasons in Cincinnati history and mentored a pair of record-setting receivers. Molnar was a large part of the historic 2009 season where the Bearcats won the Big East Conference Championship, played Florida in the Sugar Bowl and finished third in the Bowl Championship Series (BCS) rankings.

=== Notre Dame ===
When Brian Kelly was hired as the head coach at Notre Dame in December 2009, Molnar was shortly thereafter named his offensive coordinator and quarterbacks coach. In 2010, his first year with the Irish, Molnar helped install a new offensive system and developed both Dayne Crist and Tommy Rees as first-time starting quarterbacks. Crist started the first nine games and passed for 2,033 yards with 15 touchdowns before injuring a knee in the first quarter of the ninth game. Rees played the rest of the ninth game after Crist was injured and completed 33 of 54 passes for 334 yards with four touchdowns. In 2011, Molnar helped the Irish earn a second straight bowl game bid thanks in part to the play of quarterback Tommy Rees. Rees threw for over 2,700 yards that season with 19 touchdowns averaging 225.7 yards per game. As a unit, the Irish averaged 424.1 yards per game on offense thanks in part to Rees and 1,000-yard rusher Cierre Wood.

=== UMass ===
On December 8, 2011, Molnar was named the new head coach of the UMass Minutemen football team, replacing ousted coach Kevin Morris. The 2012 season was the team's first as a member of the Mid-American Conference, and UMass' final transition year to NCAA Division I FBS play. In his inaugural season with the Minutemen the team would struggle in their first year of FBS Football play. UMass would finish with an overall record of 1–11, including a 1–7 conference record, which placed them in 6th place in the MAC East. Molnar won his first game as a head coach on November 10, 2012, with a 22–14 victory over Akron. Molnar was fired on December 26, 2013 after going 2–22 over the course of two seasons. He was succeeded by Mark Whipple.

== Personal life ==
Molnar is a 1984 graduate of Lock Haven University with a bachelor's degree in political science. Molnar and his wife Meg have eight children: Charley III, Gillian, Tate, Bryce, Mitch, Gemma, Gianna and Dominic. His son, Charley III was an assistant on his staff at UMass.

Molnar is an avid runner and completed his first marathon in May, 2013 with a time of 3:44:38 in the New Jersey Marathon.

== Head coaching record ==
Year	Team	Overall	Conference	Standing	Bowl/playoffs
UMass Minutemen (Mid-American Conference) (2012–2013)
2012	UMass	1–11	1–7	6th (East)	
2013	UMass	1–11	1–7	6th (East)	
UMass:		2–22	2–14		
Total:		2–22			
