= Nate Montana =

American football player (born 1989)

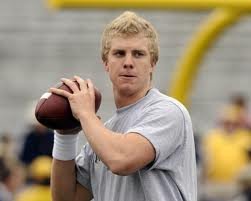

No. 6, 13
- Position: Quarterback

Personal information
- Born: October 3, 1989 (age 37); Santa Clara, California, U.S.
- Listed height: 6 ft 4 in (1.93 m)
- Listed weight: 215 lb (98 kg)

Career information
- High school: De La Salle (Concord, California)
- College: Notre Dame (2008, 2010); Pasadena City (2009); Montana (2011); West Virginia Wesleyan (2012)
- NFL draft: 2013: undrafted

Nathaniel Joseph Montana (born October 3, 1989) is an American former college football quarterback. After walking-on at Notre Dame as a freshman in 2008, he transferred to Pasadena City College in 2009, went back to Notre Dame in 2010, transferred to Montana in 2011, and finally transferred to West Virginia Wesleyan in 2012. Montana is the son of Pro Football Hall of Fame quarterback Joe Montana.

== Early life ==
In high school, Montana was a reserve quarterback at De La Salle High School in Concord, California, a suburb east of San Francisco.

== College career ==
After graduating from high school in 2008, he enrolled at Notre Dame and joined the Fighting Irish football team's coach Charlie Weis as a walk-on, with the hope of landing a scholarship as a sophomore. Following Montana's freshman year at Notre Dame, he found himself well down the depth chart at quarterback. In order to increase his playing time, he withdrew from Notre Dame in 2009 and tried out for Mt. SAC's football program but would not be the starting quarterback and later enrolled at Pasadena City College in southern California as a redshirt freshman. Montana re-enrolled at Notre Dame in January 2010. He was the quarterback behind Tommy Rees and Dayne Crist. He played in three games for the Fighting Irish as a junior in 2010, and was 9 for 18 for 116 yards with an interception. On February 14, 2011, Montana confirmed he was transferring to the University of Montana, a top FCS program in the Big Sky Conference. As the transfer was from FBS to FCS, he was eligible to play immediately. At Montana, Nate became the only player on the roster with his name on the front and back of his jersey. He transferred to West Virginia Wesleyan, an NCAA Division II program, in May 2012.

=== College statistics ===
| Season | Team | Passing | | | | | | | |
| Season | Team | Cmp | Att | Pct | Yds | Avg | TD | Int | Rtg |
|---|---|---|---|---|---|---|---|---|---|
| 2008 | Notre Dame | Redshirted | | | | | | | |
| 2009 | Pasadena City College | 31 | 88 | 35.2 | 324 | 3.7 | 2 | 5 | 62.3 |
| 2010 | Notre Dame | 9 | 18 | 50.0 | 116 | 6.4 | 0 | 1 | 93.0 |
| 2011 | Montana | 26 | 42 | 61.9 | 274 | 6.5 | 2 | 1 | 127.7 |
| 2012 | West Virginia Wesleyan | 225 | 436 | 51.6 | 2,480 | 5.7 | 19 | 7 | 110.6 |

== Personal life ==
Nate is the third child and oldest son of legendary NFL quarterback Joe Montana and Jennifer Wallace, a model/actress. His two older sisters Alexandra (b. 1985) and Elizabeth (b. 1986) also attended the University of Notre Dame. His brother Nick was the starting quarterback at nationally ranked Oaks Christian in Westlake Village and was thought to be one of the top prospects in the nation in 2010.

Montana was one of eight Notre Dame football players (and 11 total athletes) arrested for alleged underage drinking on July 16, 2010. While living in the state of Montana in 2011, Nate was arrested in Missoula on June 3 on suspicion of driving under the influence of alcohol, a charge that was later dropped. However, he was sentenced to 90 days in the Missoula County Jail, all suspended, and ordered to complete a chemical dependency evaluation.
