= Jonas Gray =

American football player (born 1990)

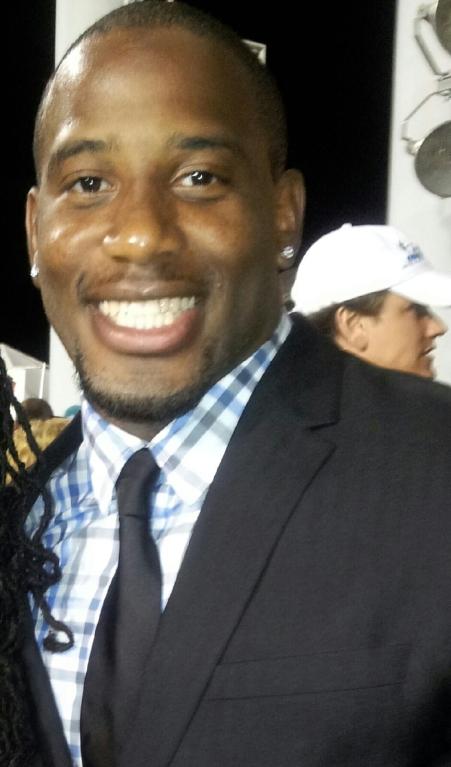
- Gray in 2013

No. 29, 34, 35
- Position: Running back

Personal information
- Born: June 27, 1990 (age 36); Pontiac, Michigan, U.S.
- Listed height: 5 ft 9 in (1.75 m)
- Listed weight: 223 lb (101 kg)

Career information
- High school: Detroit Country Day School (Beverly Hills, Michigan)
- College: Notre Dame (2008–2011)
- NFL draft: 2012: undrafted

Career history
- Miami Dolphins (2012); Baltimore Ravens (2013)*; New England Patriots (2014); Miami Dolphins (2015); Jacksonville Jaguars (2015)
- * Offseason or practice squad member only

Awards and highlights
- Super Bowl champion (XLIX)

Career NFL statistics
- Rushing attempts: 134
- Rushing yards: 588
- Rushing touchdowns: 5
- Receptions: 8
- Receiving yards: 83
- Stats at Pro Football Reference

Jonas Gray (born June 27, 1990) is an American former professional football player who was a running back in the National Football League (NFL). He played college football for the Notre Dame Fighting Irish and was signed by the Miami Dolphins as an undrafted free agent in 2012. Gray was also a member of the Baltimore Ravens, New England Patriots, and Jacksonville Jaguars.

== Early life ==
From Pontiac, Michigan, Gray went to high school at Detroit Country Day. He helped lead Detroit Country Day to an 11–3 record as a senior and an appearance in the state championship. Gray rushed for 305 yards on 29 carries and scored four touchdowns in the state semifinal to lead the Yellow Jackets to a 37–30 victory. He gained 2,614 yards on 341 rushes (7.7 avg.) and scored 32 TDs during his senior season, rushing for over 200 yards in five games. Gray was selected to play in the U.S. Army All-American Bowl in San Antonio, Texas. He also competed in track & field at Detroit County. In 2006, Gray placed fourth in the 200-meter dash at the MHSAA Division 3 State Finals with a time of 22.84 seconds, and as a senior, placed third in the 100-meter dash with a time of 11.13 seconds.

Considered a four-star recruit by Rivals.com, Gray was rated as the fourth best running back prospect of his class.

== College career ==
Gray attended the University of Notre Dame from 2008 to 2011. He played sparingly his first three seasons, primarily as a back-up to Armando Allen, Robert Hughes and Cierre Wood. As a senior, while splitting carries with Wood, Gray rushed for 791 yards on 114 carries (6.9 avg) while scoring 12 touchdowns. However, he tore his ACL, MCL, and LCL during a game against Boston College.

== Professional career ==
=== Miami Dolphins ===
Gray was signed by the Miami Dolphins as an undrafted free agent. He was placed on the PUP list while he rehabbed his injured knee. He was among final cuts on August 31, 2013.

=== Baltimore Ravens ===
Gray was signed by the Baltimore Ravens to their practice squad on September 2, 2013.

=== New England Patriots ===
Gray was signed by the New England Patriots to a future/reserve contract on January 10, 2014. Gray did not survive the final cuts, but was signed to the practice squad the next day. On October 16, Gray was signed to the active roster before their Thursday Night Football game against the New York Jets.

On November 16, 2014, Gray rushed for 201 yards, and a franchise-record four touchdowns on 37 carries in his fourth NFL game, leading the Patriots to a 42–20 road victory over the Indianapolis Colts. Gray was the first NFL running back since 1921 to score four rushing touchdowns in a game after entering the game with zero career touchdowns, and the first running back in the Super Bowl era to account for more than 25 percent of rushing touchdowns (4 of 10) in a week with at least 10 games. A correction to the official stats (removing a two-yard loss that was negated by a 15-yard facemask penalty against the Colts) made his final stats for the game 201 yards on 37 carries. Gray scored 24 total points in the game, which was tied with Marshawn Lynch for the most by any player in a single game in the 2014 season.

Gray was benched for the next game due to a team infraction of being late to practice a week after the Colts game, something head coach Bill Belichick is known not to tolerate. Gray would only record 91 more total yards in the season and was inactive for four of the Patriots remaining nine games, including the team's win in Super Bowl XLIX. Gray finished the season with 89 carries that resulted in 412 total yards and five touchdowns. On September 5, 2015, Gray was released by the Patriots.

=== Miami Dolphins (second stint) ===
The Dolphins signed Gray to their practice squad on September 9, 2015. Two days later, Gray was signed to the active roster. On September 14, Gray was waived by the Dolphins, only to be re-added to the practice squad two days later and signed to the active roster on September 22. He was released again on November 10, and was re-signed to the practice squad the next day.

=== Jacksonville Jaguars ===
Gray was signed off the Dolphins' practice squad to the Jacksonville Jaguars active roster on December 15, 2015.

On August 17, 2016, Gray was waived/injured by the Jaguars. After going unclaimed on waivers, he reverted to injured reserve. On August 24, Gray was released from injured reserve.
