= Theo Riddick =

American football player (born 1991)

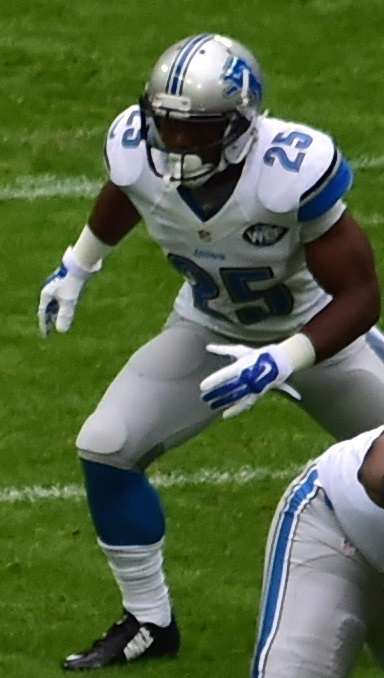
- Riddick with the Detroit Lions in 2014

No. 41, 25, 35
- Position: Running back

Personal information
- Born: May 4, 1991 (age 35); Somerville, New Jersey, U.S.
- Listed height: 5 ft 9 in (1.75 m)
- Listed weight: 201 lb (91 kg)

Career information
- High school: Immaculata (Somerville)
- College: Notre Dame (2009–2012)
- NFL draft: 2013: 6th round, 199th overall pick

Career history
- Detroit Lions (2013–2018); Denver Broncos (2019); Las Vegas Raiders (2020)

Career NFL statistics
- Rushing yards: 1,037
- Rushing average: 3.5
- Rushing touchdowns: 5
- Receptions: 290
- Receiving yards: 2,281
- Receiving touchdowns: 14
- Stats at Pro Football Reference

Theo Riddick (born May 4, 1991) is an American former professional football player who was a running back in the National Football League (NFL). He played college football for the Notre Dame Fighting Irish and was selected by the Detroit Lions in the sixth round of the 2013 NFL draft. He has also played for the Las Vegas Raiders.

== Early life ==
Raised in Somerville, New Jersey, Riddick attended Immaculata High School in Somerville, New Jersey. He rushed for 4,042 yards and 52 touchdowns during his high school football career, which also included a state championship in 2006, leading his team to victory and a perfect 12–0 season. In June 2016, Immaculata's football field was named for Riddick.

Considered a four-star recruit by Rivals.com, he was rated as the tenth-best all purpose back in the nation. He accepted a scholarship offer from Notre Dame over offers from Rutgers, Penn State, and Pittsburgh.

== College career ==
Riddick attended and played college football for Notre Dame from 2009 to 2012.

As a freshman at Notre Dame in 2009 under head coach Charlie Weis, Riddick started off his career as a reserve and primarily on special teams as a kick returner. He made his collegiate debut in a victory over Nevada. He rushed for 160 yards on 29 carries (5.5 avg) and tallied 849 kickoff return yards on 37 returns. Before the season ended, Weis was fired. In 2010, under new head coach Brian Kelly, he made the move from running back to slot receiver. In his first season as a receiver, he amassed 40 catches for 414 yards and three touchdowns, including a career game against Michigan State in which he recorded 10 catches for 128 yards and a touchdown. In 2011, he did not have the break out season many had hoped, he recorded 38 catches for 436 yards and three touchdowns. He also played running back following an injury to starter Jonas Gray near the end of the season. In his final season, as a senior in 2012, he made the move back to running back. Splitting carries with fellow senior classmate Cierre Wood, he rushed for 917 yards on 190 carries (4.8 avg) and five touchdowns. He also recorded 36 receptions for 370 yards and two touchdowns. On October 20, 2012, he had a then career-high 143 rushing yards in a victory over BYU. On November 24, 2012, he had a career day with 146 rushing yards and a rushing touchdown to go along with 33 receiving yards in the victory at Southern California. He was an integral piece to the Irish's 2012 undefeated regular season. In the BCS National Championship, he had 37 rushing yards and a six-yard receiving touchdown in the 42–14 loss.

=== College statistics ===
Year	School	Class	Pos	G	Rushing				Receiving			
Year	School	Class	Pos	G	Att	Yds	Avg	TD	Rec	Yds	Avg	TD
2009	Notre Dame	Freshman	RB	12	29	160	5.5	0	6	43	7.2	0
2010	Notre Dame	Sophomore	WR	9	11	29	2.6	0	40	414	10.4	3
2011	Notre Dame	Junior	WR	11	14	63	4.5	0	38	436	11.5	3
2012	Notre Dame	Senior	RB	13	190	917	4.8	5	36	370	10.3	2
Career				45	244	1,169	4.8	5	120	1,263	10.5	8

== Professional career ==
Pre-draft measurables
Height	Weight	Arm length	Hand span	40-yard dash	10-yard split	20-yard split	20-yard shuttle	Three-cone drill	Vertical jump	Broad jump	Bench press
5 ft 10 1/8 in (1.78 m)	201 lb (91 kg)	30 in (0.76 m)	8 3/4 in (0.22 m)	4.68 s	2.69 s	1.59 s	4.32 s	6.99 s	32 in (0.81 m)	9 ft 10 in (3.00 m)	14 reps
All values from NFL Combine/Notre Dame's Pro Day

=== Detroit Lions ===
The Detroit Lions selected Riddick in the sixth round (199th overall) of the 2013 NFL draft. Riddick was the 21st running back drafted in 2013.

On May 30, 2013, the Detroit Lions signed Riddick to a four-year, $2.25 million contract that includes a signing bonus of $91,000. Riddick was drafted due to his position flexibility. The Lions had plans to use Riddick at running back, slot receiver, third-down back, fielding punts, and kick returns. In 2013, he scored his first career touchdown on a two-yard run in Week 16 against the New York Giants. Overall, in his rookie season, he finished with 25 rushing yards, one rushing touchdown, four receptions, and 26 receiving yards.

Riddick saw an expanded role in the receiving game in the 2014 season. In Week 6, against the Minnesota Vikings, Riddick scored another touchdown on a nine-yard pass from Matthew Stafford as part of a 75-yard receiving game. Two weeks later, against the Atlanta Falcons, he had 74 receiving yards and a receiving touchdown. Overall, in the 2014 season, he finished with 51 rushing yards, 34 receptions, 316 receiving yards, and four receiving touchdowns.

Riddick saw expanded usage in the 2015 season, especially in the passing game. In the season opener against the San Diego Chargers, he had two receptions for 37 yards and a receiving touchdown. On October 11, against the Arizona Cardinals, he had 10 receptions for 51 yards and a touchdown. In a Week 16 game against the San Francisco 49ers, he caught seven passes for 63 yards, giving him 668 receiving yards on the season. This set a Lions franchise record for running backs, surpassing the 662 receiving yards gained by James Jones in 1984. Riddick finished the season with 80 receptions and 697 yards, both franchise records for a running back.

On September 9, 2016, the Detroit Lions signed Riddick to a three-year, $11.55 million contract that includes a signing bonus of $3.85 million.

In the 2016 season opener against the Indianapolis Colts, Riddick had 45 rushing yards, one rushing touchdown, five receptions, 63 receiving yards, and one receiving touchdown. He was the Lions' top running back in 2016 after a season-ending injury to Ameer Abdullah in Week 2. On October 9, against the Philadelphia Eagles, he had six receptions for 33 receiving yards and two receiving touchdowns. He played in 10 games with 8 starts in 2016, rushing for 357 yards and one touchdown to go along with 53 receptions for 371 yards and five touchdowns. He had been dealing with a lingering wrist injury towards the end of the season, leading him to be placed on injured reserve on December 31, 2016.

In the 2017 season opener against the Arizona Cardinals, Riddick had six receptions for 27 yards and a touchdown. On December 10 against the Tampa Bay Buccaneers, he had 29 rushing yards and two rushing touchdowns. Overall, in the 2017 season, he finished with 286 rushing yards, three rushing touchdowns, 53 receptions, 444 receiving yards, and two receiving touchdowns.

In a similar role to the prior year in the 2018 season, Riddick had 40 carries for 171 rushing yards and 61 receptions for 384 receiving yards.

On July 27, 2019, Riddick was released by the Lions after six seasons.

=== Denver Broncos ===
On August 4, 2019, Riddick signed with the Denver Broncos. He was placed on injured reserve on September 2, 2019, with a shoulder injury and never appeared in a game for Denver.

=== Las Vegas Raiders ===
Riddick signed with the Las Vegas Raiders on August 23, 2020. He was released on September 5, 2020, and signed to the practice squad the next day. He was elevated to the active roster on October 3 for the team's week 4 game against the Buffalo Bills, and reverted to the practice squad after the game. He was promoted to the active roster on November 5. He was placed on the reserve/COVID-19 list by the team on November 21, and activated on December 2.

On March 19, 2021, Riddick re-signed with the Raiders on a one-year contract. He announced his retirement from the NFL on July 30, 2021.

== NFL career statistics ==
Year	Team	Games		Rushing							Receiving							
Year	Team	GP	GS	Att	Yds	Avg	Lng	TD	A/G	Y/G	Tgt	Rec	Yds	Avg	Lng	TD	R/G	Y/G
2013	DET	14	0	9	25	2.8	7	1	0.6	1.8	8	4	26	6.5	8	0	0.3	1.9
2014	DET	14	2	20	51	2.6	9	0	1.4	3.6	50	34	316	9.3	41	4	2.4	22.6
2015	DET	16	1	43	133	3.1	16	0	2.7	8.3	99	80	697	8.7	34	3	5.0	43.6
2016	DET	10	8	92	357	3.9	42	1	9.2	35.7	67	53	371	7.0	23	5	5.3	37.1
2017	DET	16	5	84	286	3.4	21	3	5.3	17.9	71	53	444	8.4	63	2	3.3	27.8
2018	DET	14	3	40	171	4.3	19	0	2.9	12.2	74	61	384	6.3	20	0	4.4	27.4
2019	DEN	0	0	Did not play due to injury														
2020	LV	4	0	6	14	2.3	11	0	1.5	3.5	6	5	43	8.6	15	0	1.3	10.8
Career		88	19	294	1,037	3.5	42	5	3.3	11.8	375	290	2,281	7.9	63	14	3.3	25.9
