= Matt Bosher =

American football player (born 1987)

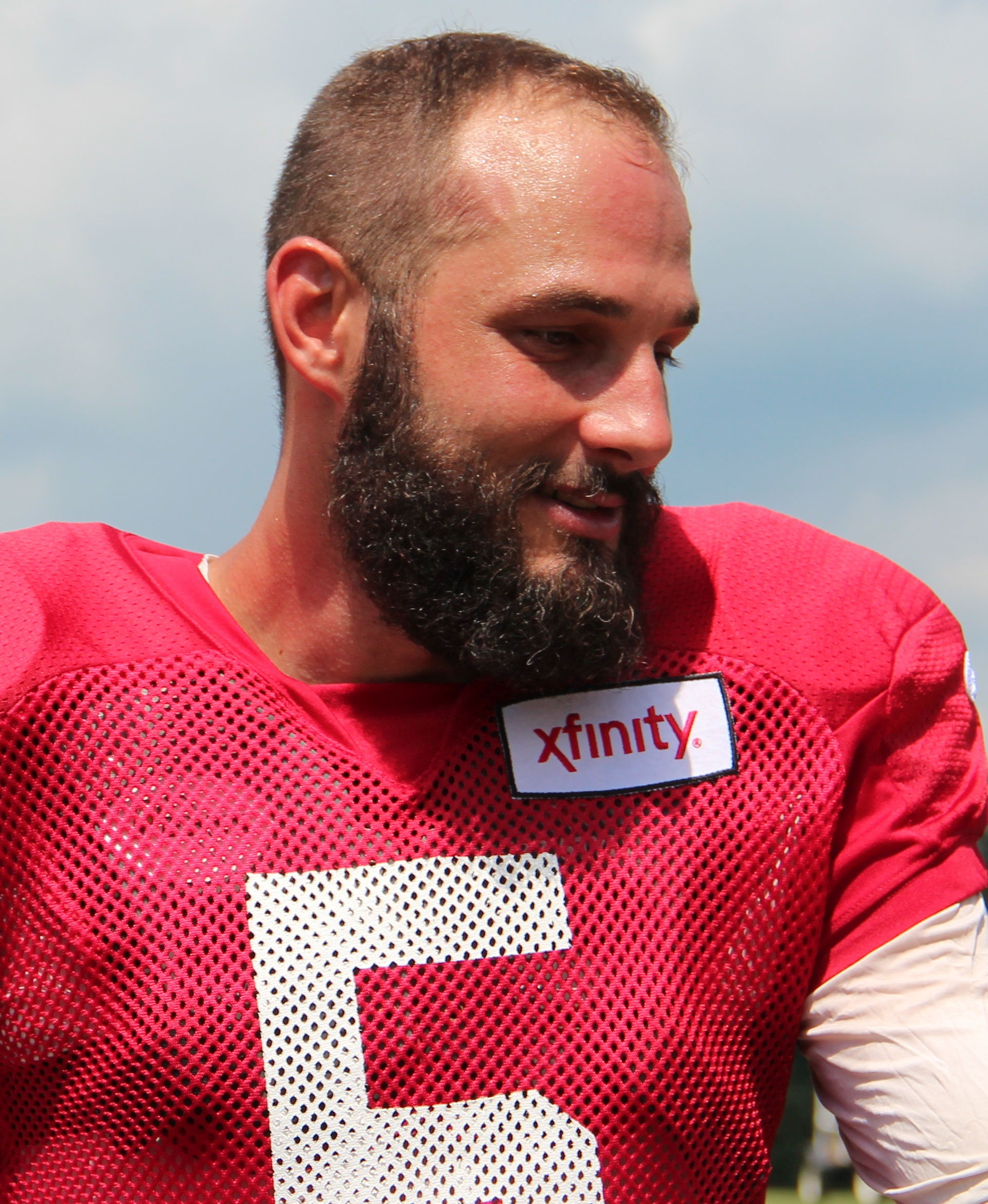
- Bosher with the Atlanta Falcons in 2016

No. 5
- Position: Punter

Personal information
- Born: October 18, 1987 (age 39); Greenacres, Florida, U.S.
- Listed height: 6 ft 0 in (1.83 m)
- Listed weight: 208 lb (94 kg)

Career information
- High school: Jupiter (Jupiter, Florida)
- College: Miami (FL) (2006–2010)
- NFL draft: 2011: 6th round, 192nd overall pick

Career history
- Atlanta Falcons (2011–2019)

Awards and highlights
- PFWA All-Rookie Team (2011); 2× First-team All-ACC (2009, 2010); Second-team All-ACC (2008)

Career NFL statistics
- Punts: 489
- Punting yards: 22,346
- Punting average: 45.7
- Inside 20: 190
- Stats at Pro Football Reference

Matthew Bosher (born October 18, 1987) is an American former professional football player who was a punter in the National Football League (NFL). He was selected by the Atlanta Falcons in the sixth round of the 2011 NFL draft. He played college football at the University of Miami.

== Early life ==
Bosher played high school football at Jupiter High School in Jupiter, Florida. While playing for the Jupiter High School Warriors, he was one of the top placekickers in the country. He was rated as the best placekicker in the country by Scout.com, the fourth best by ESPN, and the sixth best by Rivals.com. In addition to his ranking accolades, he was chosen as the best kicker in the state of Florida on the Florida Times-Union Super 75.

== College career ==
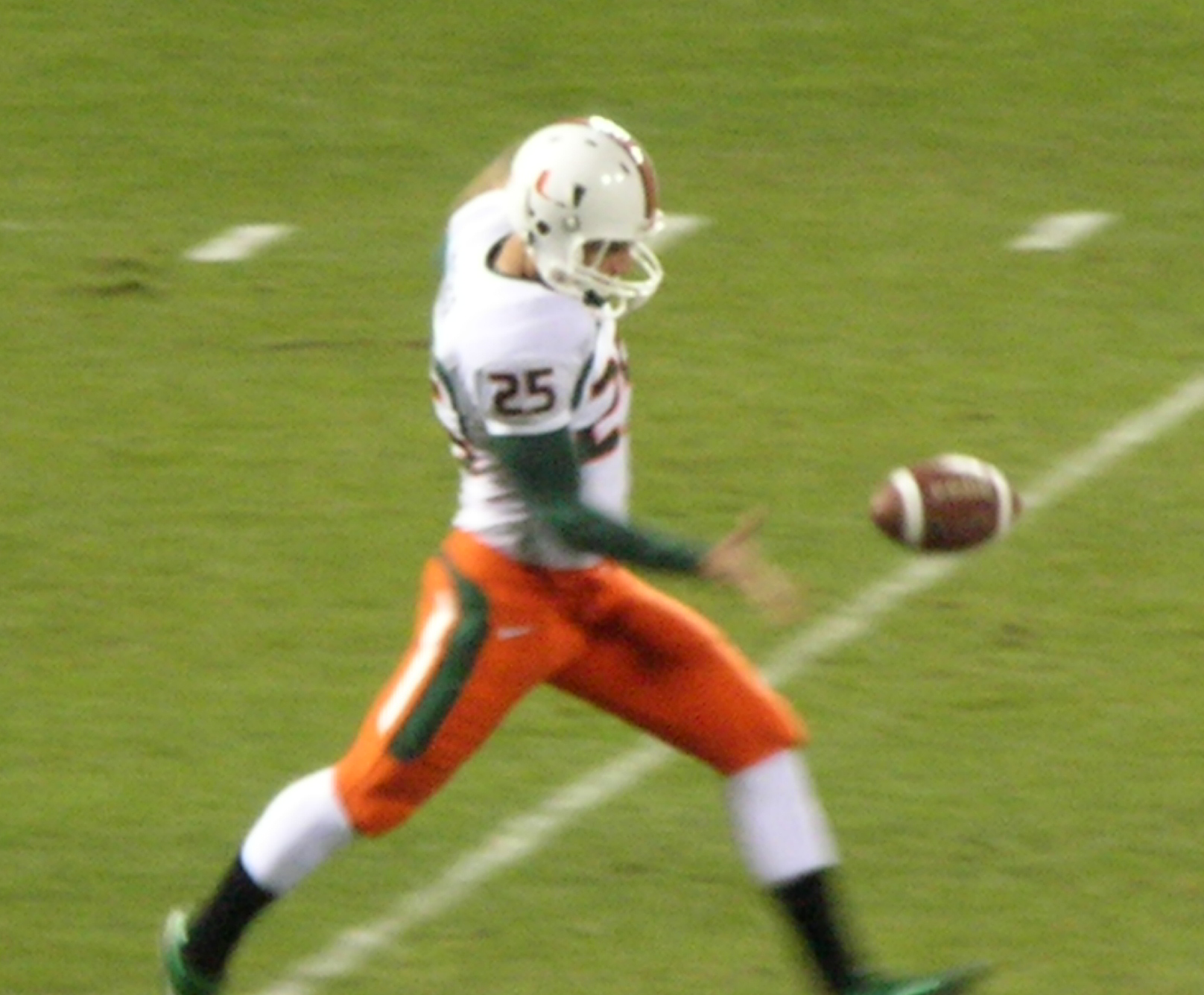
Boshner punts for the Miami Hurricanes during the 2008 Emerald Bowl

Bosher played college football at the University of Miami from 2007 to 2010 under head coach Randy Shannon. He was the team's starting punter for four years, punting for 9,778 yards for the Hurricanes. He was the team's starting placekicker from 2008 to 2010. In four years at the University of Miami, Bosher scored 262 points. He converted 127-of-130 extra point attempts and 45-of-53 field goal attempts in his college career. He was a first-team All-ACC player.

=== 2007 season ===
As a true freshman at the University of Miami, Bosher appeared in all 12 games in the 2007 season. He punted a season-high 10 times for 408 total yards in the second game of the season against Oklahoma. Against Virginia Tech in the 11th game of the season, Bosher punted six times for 310 yards, which was a season-high 51.7 yard average. Overall, in the 2007 season, Bosher punted 58 times for 2,329 yards for a 40.2 average.

=== 2008 season ===
As a sophomore at the University of Miami, Bosher appeared in all 13 games in the 2008 season. He served as the placekicker and punter for team for the first time in his collegiate career. In two games in the 2008 season, which were against Charleston Southern and Duke, Bosher attempted and converted all seven extra point tries. He punted a season-high 11 times for 410 total yards in the sixth game of the season against Central Florida. Against NC State in the 12th game of the season, Bosher punted four times for 195 yards, which was a season-high 48.8 yard average. Against the Florida State in the fifth game of the season, Bosher rushed nine yards on a fake punt for a first down. Overall, in the 2008 season, Bosher converted all 40 extra point attempts and 18-of-20 field goal attempts to go along with punting 67 times for 2,638 yards for a 40.0 average.

=== 2009 season ===
As a junior at the University of Miami, Bosher appeared in all 13 games in the 2009 season. For the second straight season, he would serve as the placekicker and the punter. Against the Virginia in the ninth game of the season, Bosher would tie a career-high seven made extra point attempts. Against Clemson in the seventh game of the season, he would tie a career high three field goals attempted and made. He punted a season-high nine times for 387 total yards in the eighth game of the season against Wake Forest. Against Florida A&M in the fifth game of the season, Bosher punted for a season-high 47.5 yard average. Against North Carolina, Bosher rushed 26 yards a successful fake punt. Overall, in the 2009 season, Bosher converted all 50 extra point attempts and was 14-of-16 on field goal attempts to go along with Bosher punting 51 times for 2,169 yards for a 42.5 average.

=== 2010 season ===
As a senior at the University of Miami, Bosher appeared in all 13 games in the 2010 season. He served as the placekicker and punter for team for the third straight season. He punted a season-high ten times for 463 total yards in the fourth game of the season against Clemson. Against Virginia in the eighth game of the season, Bosher punted four times for 231 total yards, which was a career-high 57.8 yard average. In his final collegiate game, which was the 2010 Sun Bowl against Notre Dame, he punted four times for 163 yards. Overall, in the 2010 season, Bosher converted 37-of-40 extra point tries and 13-of-17 field goal attempts to go along with punting 59 times for 2,597 yards for a 44.0 average.

== Professional career ==
Pre-draft measurables
Height	Weight	Arm length	Hand span	Wingspan	Bench press
6 ft 0 5/8 in (1.84 m)	208 lb (94 kg)	31 1/2 in (0.80 m)	9 3/4 in (0.25 m)	6 ft 2 1/4 in (1.89 m)	8 reps
All values from NFL Combine

=== 2011 season ===
Bosher was selected by the Atlanta Falcons in the sixth round (192nd overall) of the 2011 NFL draft. He was signed by the team on July 28.

As a rookie with the Falcons, Bosher appeared in all 16 regular season games and their one playoff game as the punter. In the season opener, he made his NFL debut against the Chicago Bears at Soldier Field. In the 30–12 loss to the Bears, he had five punts for 192 yards. In Week 9, against the Indianapolis Colts at Lucas Oil Stadium, he set a season high for yardage with 321 on seven punts. On Sunday, December 11, 2011, in Week 14, with averages of 47.8 yards (gross) and 46.0 (net) on six punts against the Carolina Panthers, "ESPN Stats & Information" selected Bosher as the punter of the day in the NFL. In Week 15, against the Jacksonville Jaguars at the Georgia Dome, he set a season-high for yards per punt with 51.00, which came from four punts for 204 yards, in the 41–14 home victory. He was named to the All-Rookie Team.

On January 8, 2012, Bosher made his playoff debut in the Falcons' 24–2 loss to the New York Giants in the Wild Card Round. He had seven punts for 322 yards in the loss at MetLife Stadium.

Overall, in his rookie regular season, Bosher had 70 punts for 2,990 yards, which was an average of 42.71 yards per punt.

=== 2012 season ===
In his second season with the Atlanta Falcons, Bosher appeared in all 16 regular season games and their two playoff games. In Week 13, against their NFC South division rival New Orleans Saints at the Georgia Dome, Bosher had six punts for a season-high 319 yards. In the same game, he set his season high for yards per punt with 53.17. In the regular season finale, in a home game against division rival Tampa Bay, Bosher had his second game with over 300 net yards with 305 yards on six punts.

The Falcons would make a return trip to the playoffs in the 2012 season. In a home game against the Seattle Seahawks in the Divisional Round, Bosher had two punts for 84 yards in the 30–28 victory. In a home game against the San Francisco 49ers in the NFC Championship, Bosher had two punts for 90 yards in the 28–24 defeat.

Overall, in the 2012 regular season, Bosher had 60 punts for 2,847 yards for a 47.45 average to go along with four punts for 174 yards in the playoffs for a 43.5 average.

=== 2013 season ===
In the 2013 season, Bosher appeared in all 16 regular season games for the Falcons. In Week 2, against the St. Louis Rams, Bosher had six punts for a season-high 318 yards. In a 2012 Divisional Round rematch against the Seattle Seahawks in Week 10, he had a season high 53.40 yards per punt from five punts for 267 yards. Against the Buffalo Bills in Week 13, he had a season-high seven punts for 278 yards.

Overall, in the 2013 regular season, Bosher had 68 punts for 3,166 yards for a 46.56 average.

=== 2014 season ===
In the 2014 season, Bosher appeared in all 16 regular season games for the Falcons. In Week 11, against their divisional rival Carolina Panthers, Bosher had a season-high seven punts for a season-high 344 yards. Against the Arizona Cardinals in Week 13, he had a season-high 53.00 yards per punt average from three punts for 159 yards. He was named NFC Special Teams Player of the Week for Week 16 against the New Orleans Saints. He had five punts for 221 net yards for a 44.2 average. All of the punts pinned the Saints deep in their own territory.

Overall, in the 2014 regular season, Bosher had 67 punts for 3,063 yards for a 45.72 average.

=== 2015 season ===
In the 2015 season, Bosher appeared in all 16 regular season games for the Falcons. In the season opener against the Philadelphia Eagles, Bosher had a season-high 57.75 yards per punt average from four punts for 231 yards. In Week 8, against the Tampa Bay Buccaneers, Bosher did not attempt one punt in the game for the first time in his NFL career. In Week 9, against the San Francisco 49ers, Bosher had a season-high seven punts for a season-high 304 yards.

Overall, in the 2015 regular season, Bosher had 58 punts for 2,735 yards for a 47.16 average.

=== 2016 season ===
In the 2016 season, Bosher appeared in all 16 regular season games and all three playoff games for the Falcons. In Week 5 against the Denver Broncos, Bosher had a season-high 61.67 average yards per punt, which came from three punts for 185 yards. In Week 10 against the Philadelphia Eagles, Bosher injured his hamstring. Matt Bryant, the team's normal placekicker, had to finish the game with punting responsibilities. In Week 14 against the Los Angeles Rams, Bosher had a season-high eight punts for a season-high 415 net yards, which equated to a 51.88 average.

The Falcons would return to the playoffs for the first time since the 2012 season. Against the Seattle Seahawks in the Divisional Round, Bosher had three punts for 133 yards in the 36–20 victory. Against the Green Bay Packers in the NFC Championship, Bosher had two punts for 77 yards in the 44–21 victory. Against the New England Patriots in Super Bowl LI at NRG Stadium in Houston, Texas, Bosher had six punts for 282 yards in the 34–28 defeat in overtime.

Overall, in the 2016 regular season, Bosher had 44 punts for 2,060 yards for a 46.82 average to go along with 11 punts for 492 yards in the playoffs for a 44.73 average.

=== 2017 season ===
In the 2017 season, Bosher appeared in all 16 regular season games and two playoff games for the Falcons. In the season opener against the Chicago Bears, he had three punts for 178 net yards for a season-high 59.33 average. On Christmas Eve, against the New Orleans Saints, he had a season-high five punts for a season-high 234 net yards for a 46.80 average. Overall, in the 2017 season, he finished with 53 punts for 2,379 net yards for a 44.89 average.

The Falcons finished the season with a 10–6 record and made the playoffs. In the Wild Card Round against the Los Angeles Rams, he had five punts for 258 net yards for a 51.60 average in the 26–13 victory. In the Divisional Round against the eventual Super Bowl LII champion Philadelphia Eagles, he had six punts for 203 net yards for a 33.83 average in the 15–10 loss.

=== 2018 season ===
In the 2018 season, Bosher appeared in all 16 games and recorded 60 punts for 2,729 net yards for a 45.48 average.

=== 2019 season ===
On October 5, 2019, Bosher was placed on injured reserve with a groin injury. He was designated for return from injured reserve on November 20, 2019, and began practicing with the team again. On December 2, 2019, Bosher was activated from injured reserve. He was placed back on injured reserve on December 7, 2019, after aggravating the groin injury. Bosher appeared in three games in the 2019 season.

== NFL career statistics ==
Legend
	Led the league
**Bold**	Career high

=== Regular season ===
Year	Team	Punting									
Year	Team	GP	Punts	Yds	Net Yds	Lng	Avg	Net Avg	Blk	Ins20	TB
2011	ATL	**16**	**70**	2,990	2,760	59	42.7	38.9	1	**27**	**4**
2012	ATL	**16**	60	2,847	2,526	63	**47.5**	40.7	**2**	22	**4**
2013	ATL	**16**	68	**3,166**	**2,875**	63	46.6	41.1	**2**	26	2
2014	ATL	**16**	67	3,063	2,733	66	45.7	40.8	0	**27**	**4**
2015	ATL	**16**	58	2,735	2,383	**69**	47.2	40.4	1	24	**4**
2016	ATL	15	44	2,060	1,831	68	46.8	**41.6**	0	21	1
2017	ATL	**16**	53	2,379	2,160	62	44.9	40.8	0	19	2
2018	ATL	**16**	60	2,729	2,485	57	45.5	40.1	**2**	22	3
2019	ATL	3	9	377	367	52	41.9	36.7	1	2	0
Career		130	489	22,346	20,120	69	45.7	40.4	9	190	24

=== Playoffs ===
Year	Team	Punting									
Year	Team	GP	Punts	Yds	Net Yds	Lng	Avg	Net Avg	Blk	Ins20	TB
2011	ATL	1	7	322	294	59	**46.0**	**42.0**	0	1	0
2012	ATL	2	4	174	130	48	43.5	32.5	0	1	0
2016	ATL	**3**	**11**	**492**	433	**60**	44.7	39.4	0	**7**	0
2017	ATL	2	**11**	461	**454**	**60**	41.9	41.3	0	4	0
Career		8	33	1,449	1,311	60	43.9	39.7	0	13	0
