= Michael Floyd =

American football player (born 1989)

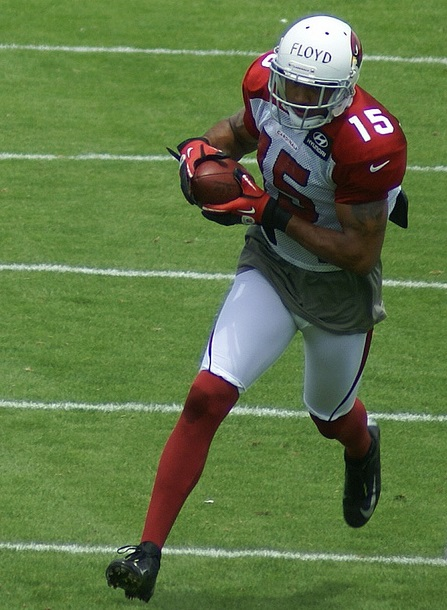
- Floyd with the Arizona Cardinals in 2013

No. 15, 14, 18, 17
- Position: Wide receiver

Personal information
- Born: November 27, 1989 (age 36); Saint Paul, Minnesota, U.S.
- Listed height: 6 ft 3 in (1.91 m)
- Listed weight: 220 lb (100 kg)

Career information
- High school: Cretin-Derham Hall (Saint Paul)
- College: Notre Dame (2008–2011)
- NFL draft: 2012: 1st round, 13th overall pick

Career history
- Arizona Cardinals (2012–2016); New England Patriots (2016); Minnesota Vikings (2017); New Orleans Saints (2018)*; Washington Redskins (2018); Baltimore Ravens (2019)*
- * Offseason or practice squad member only

Awards and highlights
- Super Bowl champion (LI); Hendricks Trophy (Sun Bowl MVP) (2010)

Career NFL statistics
- Receptions: 266
- Receiving yards: 3,959
- Receiving touchdowns: 25
- Stats at Pro Football Reference

Michael Floyd Jr. (born November 27, 1989) is an American former professional football player who was a wide receiver for seven seasons in the National Football League (NFL). He played college football for the Notre Dame Fighting Irish from 2008 to 2011, finishing with 271 receptions for 3,686 yards and 37 touchdowns, all school records. He was selected by the Arizona Cardinals in the first round of the 2012 NFL draft, but was dismissed from the Cardinals during the 2016 season, after he was arrested on drinking and driving charges. He has also played for the New England Patriots, Minnesota Vikings, New Orleans Saints, Washington Redskins, and Baltimore Ravens.

== Early life ==
Born in Saint Paul, Minnesota, to Michael Floyd Sr. and Theresa Romero, Floyd attended Cretin-Derham Hall High School, where he played for the Raiders football team as a wide receiver. In his junior year, Floyd caught 63 passes for 1,240 yards and 16 touchdowns. As a senior, he recorded 59 receptions for 1,247 yards (21.1 avg.) and 17 touchdowns, and added 497 rushing yards on 43 carries (11.6 avg.) while also returning 16 punts for 373 yards (23.3 avg.) and four more scores, helping lead his high school team to a 13–1 record and an appearance in the state championship game. In order to afford the school, Floyd worked off a scholarship by helping the custodial staff clean the school before the day started. Floyd was named Minnesota Player of the Year twice by the Associated Press (AP) and Gatorade (2007, 2008). He was a USA Today High School All-American in 2007, and was picked to play in the U.S. Army All-American Bowl in San Antonio, Texas.

In addition to football, Floyd also participated in basketball and track while at Cretin. In basketball, he averaged 23.5 points per game as a senior for the Raiders, scoring at least 30 points in six games. He totaled 1,380 points in his basketball career, finishing just 86 points short of the school record for most career points. In track and field, he competed as a sprinter and long jumper during his senior year. He recorded personal-bests of 22.9 seconds in the 200-meter dash and 6.40 meters (20 ft, 6 in) in the long jump.

Considered a five-star recruit by Rivals.com, Floyd was listed as the No. 3 wide receiver in the nation. He was ranked the top wide receiver and the third-best player on the Detroit Free Press Best of the Midwest Top 20 list. Tom Lemming rated him the 15th-best player in the nation, while Scout.com ranked him as the 16th-best. After narrowing his list of college choices to Michigan, Ohio State, Miami, Florida and Notre Dame, Floyd decided to play college football for the Fighting Irish, committing on October 19, 2007.

== College career ==
=== Freshman season (2008) ===
As a true freshman at the University of Notre Dame, Floyd played in 11 of the Fighting Irish's 13 games on the year, only missing the final two games of the regular season (Syracuse and USC) due to an injury sustained early against Navy. He recorded seven touchdown receptions on the year, breaking the record for an Irish freshman (previously held by teammate Duval Kamara's four touchdowns in 2007), while catching 48 balls to break another Notre Dame freshman record in receptions (Kamara had 32 in 2007). His 719 receiving yards set the mark for Notre Dame first-year players (Tony Hunter had 690 in 1979).

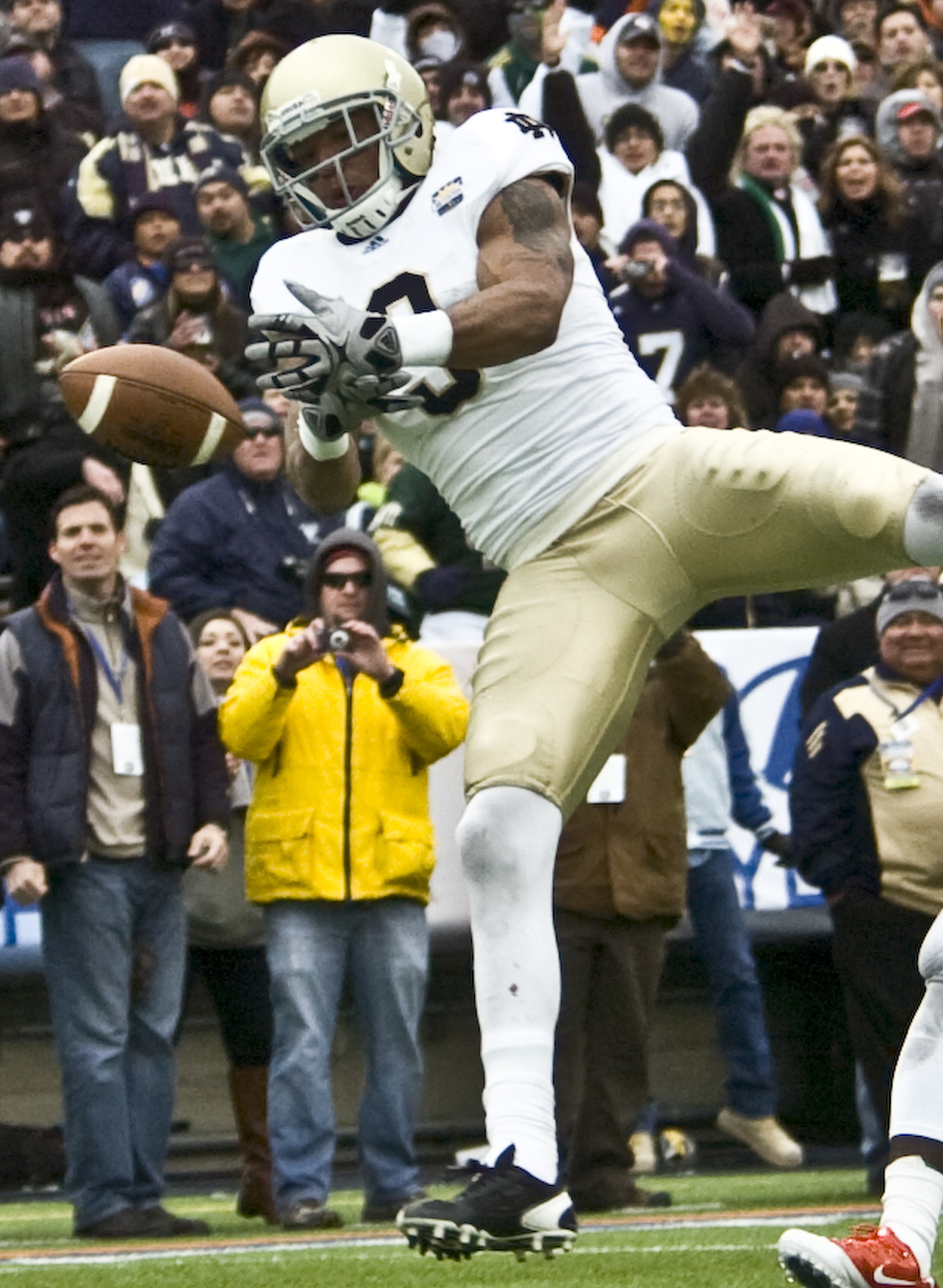
Floyd playing for Notre Dame

=== Sophomore season (2009) ===
Floyd began his sophomore season with 3 touchdowns and 189 yards receiving on 4 receptions. Later in the season, Floyd suffered a fractured clavicle, which prevented him from playing in 5 of Notre Dame's 12 games. He returned from that injury and finished the season with 9 receiving touchdowns and almost 800 receiving yards in 7 games of action.

=== Junior season (2010) ===
In 2010, Floyd started every game leading the Irish to an 8–5 record. He ended the season with 79 receptions for 1,025 yards and 12 touchdowns. The 79 catches ranked second in Notre Dame single-season history, while his 12 touchdowns tied for fourth most in a season and his 1,025 receiving yards ranked seventh. Floyd was named MVP for Notre Dame and the Sun Bowl.

=== Senior season (2011) ===
After receiving a citation for drunken driving on March 20, 2011, Floyd was suspended indefinitely from the Notre Dame football team on March 21, 2011. The suspension was lifted August 3, 2011, allowing him to return playing football at Notre Dame without missing any games of the 2011 season. Coach Kelly did not however allow Floyd to remain a team captain, leaving senior Harrison Smith the lone captain.

After being suspended from team activities for several months, Floyd was reinstated in August just as fall practice began. In 2011, he started every game leading the Irish to once again, an 8–5 record. He finished the season with 100 receptions for 1,147 yards and 9 touchdowns, including one rushing touchdown. His 100 catches marked a new career best, and also set a new school record, surpassing former teammate Golden Tate's 93 receptions in 2009. He also set school records for career receptions (271), career 100-yd games (16), receiving yards (3,689), and receiving touchdowns (37).

== Professional career ==
External videos
- Floyd performing at the NFL Combine
- Floyd gets drafted by the Cardinals

Pre-draft measurables
Height	Weight	Arm length	Hand span	Wingspan	40-yard dash	10-yard split	20-yard split	20-yard shuttle	Three-cone drill	Vertical jump	Broad jump	Bench press
6 ft 2 5/8 in (1.90 m)	220 lb (100 kg)	32 7/8 in (0.84 m)	9 3/8 in (0.24 m)	6 ft 6 in (1.98 m)	4.47 s	1.59 s	2.66 s	4.37 s	7.11 s	36.5 in (0.93 m)	10 ft 2 in (3.10 m)	16 reps
All values from NFL Combine/Pro Day

=== Arizona Cardinals ===
The Arizona Cardinals selected Floyd in the first round (13th overall) of the 2012 NFL draft. On June 11, 2012, the Cardinals signed him to a fully guaranteed four-year, $9.97 million contract.

Floyd began the 2012 NFL season as a backup wide receiver. His first career reception was an eight-yard touchdown off a deflected pass in a 27–6 win against the Philadelphia Eagles. He played in all 16 games with three starts recording 45 receptions for 562 yards and two touchdowns.

In the 2013 season, Floyd started all 16 games recording 65 receptions for 1,041 yards and five touchdowns.

On April 29, 2015, the Arizona Cardinals opted to exercise the fifth-year, $7.32 million option on Floyd's rookie contract.

Floyd was released by Cardinals on December 14, 2016, following a DUI arrest.

=== New England Patriots ===
Floyd was claimed off waivers by the New England Patriots on December 15, 2016. Floyd recorded his first catch as a Patriot in the team's Week 16 blowout win over the New York Jets, a six-yard throw from Patriots backup quarterback Jimmy Garoppolo. On January 1, 2017, Floyd caught his first touchdown as a Patriot against the Miami Dolphins. He also assisted fellow wide receiver Julian Edelman on his 77-yard touchdown catch and run by delivering a crushing block to Dolphins cornerback Tony Lippett. He was inactive for the final two playoff games as the Patriots advanced to the franchise's ninth Super Bowl appearance. On February 5, 2017, Floyd's Patriots appeared in Super Bowl LI. Floyd was inactive for the Super Bowl. The Patriots defeated the Atlanta Falcons by a score of 34–28 in overtime.

=== Minnesota Vikings ===
On May 10, 2017, the Minnesota Vikings signed Floyd to a one-year, $1.41 million contract After signing with the Vikings, he stated: "I am very excited to come home and play for the Vikings. I have been training extremely hard this offseason in addition to taking responsibility and paying the consequences for my mistake. Although I cannot change my past decisions, I have definitely learned from this experience and look forward to making valuable contributions to the Vikings organization and the Minnesota community, both as a player and a person." On July 14, 2017, Floyd was suspended for the first four games of the 2017 regular season for violating the NFL Policy and Program for Substances of Abuse. Floyd was re-activated on October 9, 2017, for a Monday Night Football matchup against the Chicago Bears.

=== New Orleans Saints ===
On July 31, 2018, Floyd signed with the New Orleans Saints. On September 1, 2018, Floyd was released.

=== Washington Redskins ===
On September 17, 2018, Floyd signed with the Washington Redskins.

=== Baltimore Ravens ===
On May 17, 2019, Floyd signed with the Baltimore Ravens. He was released during final roster cuts on August 30, 2019.

== Career statistics ==
=== NFL ===
==== Regular season ====
Year	Team	Games		Receiving					Rushing					Fumbles	
Year	Team	GP	GS	Rec	Yds	Avg	Lng	TD	Att	Yds	Avg	Lng	TD	Fum	Lost
2012	ARI	16	3	45	562	12.5	53	2	0	0	0.0	0	0	1	1
2013	ARI	16	16	65	1,041	16.0	91T	5	0	0	0.0	0	0	0	0
2014	ARI	16	14	47	841	17.9	63	6	1	2	2.0	2	0	3	1
2015	ARI	15	6	52	849	16.3	60T	6	0	0	0.0	0	0	0	0
2016	ARI	13	7	33	446	13.5	39	4	0	0	0.0	0	0	0	0
2016	NE	2	1	4	42	10.5	14T	1	0	0	0.0	0	0	0	0
2017	MIN	11	1	10	78	7.8	19	0	0	0	0.0	0	0	0	0
2018	WAS	13	3	10	100	10.0	20	1	0	0	0	0	0	0	0
Total		102	51	266	3,959	14.9	91T	25	1	2	2.0	2	0	4	2

==== Postseason ====
Year	Team	Games		Receiving					Rushing					Fumbles	
Year	Team	GP	GS	Rec	Yds	Avg	Lng	TD	Att	Yds	Avg	Lng	TD	Fum	Lost
2014	ARI	1	1	1	−12	−12.0	−12	0	0	0	0.0	0	0	0	0
2015	ARI	2	2	6	63	10.5	15	2	0	0	0.0	0	0	0	0
2016	NE	1	1	1	9	9.0	9	0	0	0	0.0	0	0	0	0
2017	MIN	2	0	0	0	0.0	0	0	0	0	0.0	0	0	0	0
Total		6	4	8	60	7.5	15	2	0	0	0.0	0	0	0	0

=== College ===
Year	Team	Receiving				Rushing				Punt return			
Year	Team	Rec	Yds	Avg	TD	Att	Yds	Avg	TD	Ret	Yds	Avg	TD
2008	Notre Dame	48	719	15.0	7	0	0	0.0	0	0	0	0.0	0
2009	Notre Dame	44	795	18.1	9	1	8	8.0	0	0	0	0.0	0
2010	Notre Dame	79	1,025	13.0	12	1	9	9.0	0	0	0	0.0	0
2011	Notre Dame	100	1,147	11.5	9	2	13	6.5	1	2	44	22.0	0
Career		271	3,686	13.6	37	4	30	7.5	1	2	44	22.0	0

== Personal life ==
On March 20, 2011, Floyd was arrested for DUI. On December 12, 2016, Floyd was arrested and charged with two counts of driving under the influence after he was found passed out behind the wheel. On February 17, 2017, he was found guilty of DUI, and was sentenced to 24 days in jail and 96 days of house arrest. After his release, he was ordered to pay a fine worth over 5,000 dollars as part of his plea and undergo 30 hours of community service.
