= Dayne Crist =

American football player (born 1989)

No. 10
- Position: Quarterback

Personal information
- Born: October 9, 1989 (age 37); Sherman Oaks, California, U.S.
- Listed height: 6 ft 4 in (1.93 m)
- Listed weight: 235 lb (107 kg)

Career information
- High school: Notre Dame (Sherman Oaks)
- College: Notre Dame (2008–2011); Kansas (2012)
- NFL draft: 2013: undrafted

Career history
- Baltimore Ravens (2013)*
- * Offseason or practice squad member only
- Stats at Pro Football Reference

Dayne Lawrence Crist (born October 9, 1989) is an American former football quarterback. He played college football for the Notre Dame Fighting Irish before transferring to the Kansas Jayhawks.

== Early life ==
Crist attended Notre Dame High School in Sherman Oaks, Los Angeles, California. As a senior in 2007 he threw for 2,178 yards with 16 touchdowns and one interception in 10 games, also adding 81 rushing attempts for 454 yards and four TDs. Crist was rated the third best quarterback and 25th best overall recruit in 2008 according to Rivals.com, and was one of seven quarterbacks named to the Parade All-American team.

College recruiting
Name	Hometown	School	Height	Weight	40^{‡}	Commit date
Dayne Crist; QB	Sherman Oaks, California	Notre Dame High School	6 ft 5 in (1.96 m)	228 lb (103 kg)	4.66	Apr 20, 2007
Dayne Crist; QB	Recruit ratings: Scout: Rivals: (84)					
Overall recruit ranking: Scout: 3 (QB) Rivals: 25, 2 (QB), 4 (CA) ESPN: 22, 2 (QB)
Note: In many cases, Scout, Rivals, 247Sports, On3, and ESPN may conflict in their listings of height and weight.; In these cases, the average was taken. ESPN grades are on a 100-point scale.; Sources: "Notre Dame Football Commitment List". Rivals.; "Notre Dame College Football Recruiting Commits". Scout.; "ESPN". ESPN.; "Scout.com Team Recruiting Rankings". Scout.; "2008 Team Ranking". Rivals.com.

== College career ==
=== Notre Dame ===
After not seeing any game action as a freshman in 2008, he completed 10 of 20 passes for 130 yards with a touchdown and interception as backup to Jimmy Clausen during his sophomore season in 2009. During a game against Washington State he tore his ACL and it was announced that he would be out four to six months. Despite the injury he became Notre Dame's starting quarterback in 2010.

Crist had his best football season in his sophomore year at the University of Notre Dame. Crist completed 59.2 percent of his passes in 2010, passing for 2,033 yards, 15 touchdowns and 7 interceptions, before suffering a ruptured left patella tendon against Tulsa, ending his season.

On August 23, 2011, Brian Kelly named him the starting quarterback for the 2011 season, after saying the quarterback contest between Crist and Rees was "very close." At halftime of the 2011 season opener against the University of South Florida, Brian Kelly benched the ineffective Crist in favor of Tommy Rees; the Fighting Irish went on to lose the game, and afterwards Kelly named Rees the new starting quarterback and named Crist the backup.

=== Kansas ===
At the end of the 2011 season, Crist was benched once again and he announced that he was leaving Notre Dame to play at the University of Kansas, reuniting him with former Notre Dame coach Charlie Weis. Crist became immediately eligible since he completed undergraduate requirements.

Crist entered the 2012 season as the starting quarterback. Following a disappointing start to the campaign which had taken the Jayhawks out of bowl contention, Crist had increasingly lost playing time to accommodate redshirt freshman Michael Cummings.

Kansas' 2012 football season ended with a game at West Virginia in which Crist played only a few snaps. Although only winning one game out of twelve, the Jayhawks were extremely competitive throughout the year. They led part of the first half versus Kansas State who at the time was #7 in the nation before losing 56–16. The Jayhawks also nearly beat Texas at home who were ranked in the top 25 at the time. The Jayhawks also went into overtime and nearly beat Texas Tech who was also a top 25 team at the time. The Jayhawks failed to win a game after Labor Day with Crist finishing the season with the worst quarterback rating in NCAA Division 1A (ranked 116th out of 116 qualifying quarterbacks).

Crist played in the January 2013 edition of the NFLPA Collegiate Bowl, and was named the game MVP.

=== College statistics ===
Season	Team	Games		Passing			
Season	Team	Comp	Att	Yds	TD	Int	Rtg
2009	Notre Dame	10	20	130	1	1	111.1
2010	Notre Dame	174	294	2,033	15	7	129.3
2011	Notre Dame	15	24	164	0	1	111.6
2012	Kansas	103	216	1,313	4	9	96.5
Career		302	554	3,640	20	18	115.1

== Professional career ==
=== Baltimore Ravens ===
Crist was invited to the Kansas City Chiefs rookie minicamp. He was not offered a contract at the conclusion of the minicamp.

On May 15, 2013, Crist signed with the Baltimore Ravens. On June 4, 2013, he was released by the Baltimore Ravens.

On August 25, 2013, Crist re-signed with the Ravens as backup cover for Tyrod Taylor, who sustained a concussion in the Ravens' third preseason game. On August 30, 2013, he was waived by the Ravens.
