= Tommy Rees (American football) =

American football player and coach (born 1992)

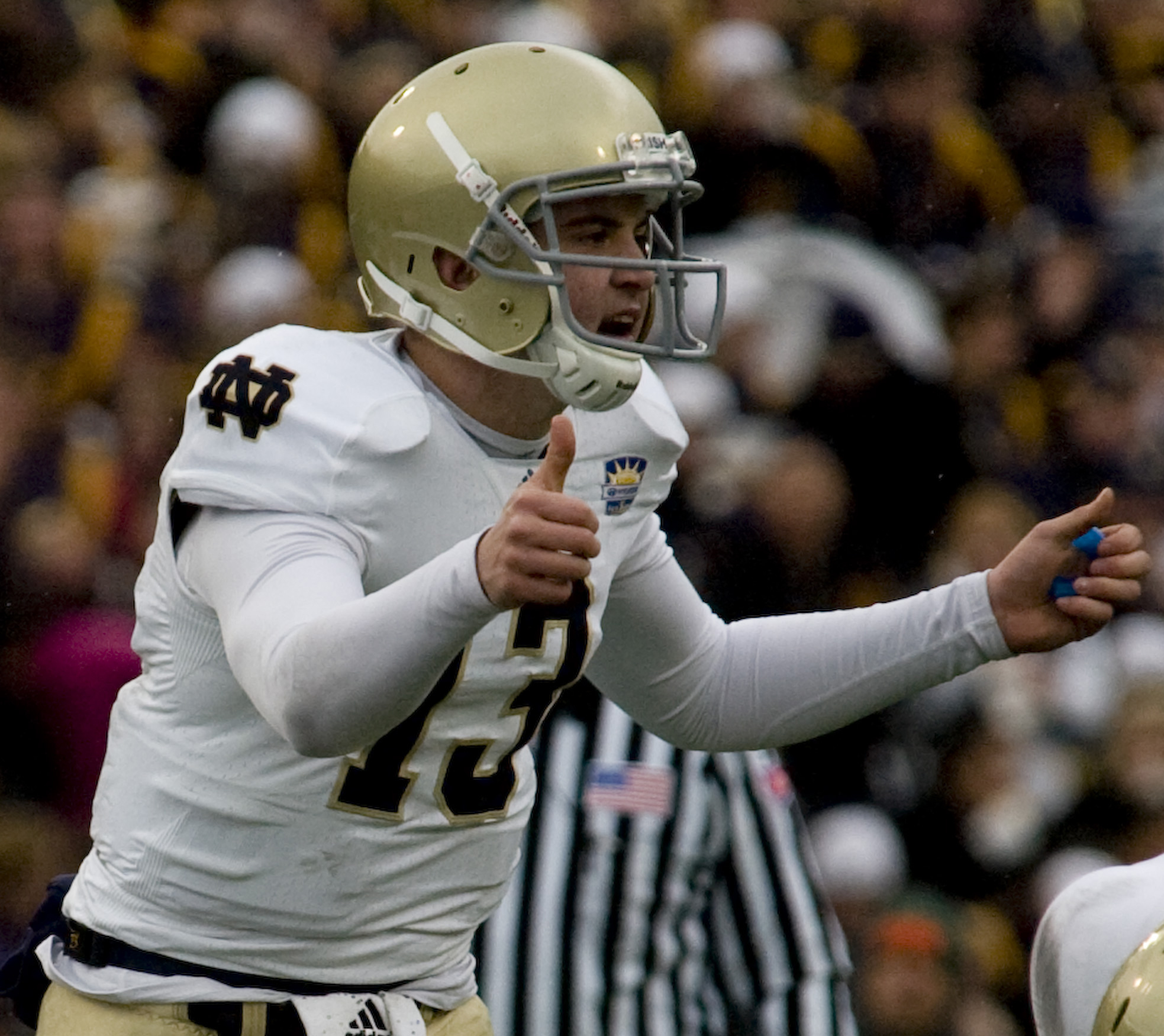
- Rees with the Notre Dame Fighting Irish in the 2010 Sun Bowl

Atlanta Falcons
- Title: Offensive coordinator

Personal information
- Born: May 22, 1992 (age 34); Los Angeles, California, U.S.
- Listed height: 6 ft 1 in (1.85 m)
- Listed weight: 215 lb (98 kg)

Career information
- Position: Quarterback
- High school: Lake Forest (Lake Forest, Illinois)
- College: Notre Dame (2010–2013)
- NFL draft: 2014: undrafted

Career history

Playing
- Washington Redskins (2014)*
- * Offseason or practice squad member only

Coaching
- Northwestern (2015) Graduate assistant; San Diego Chargers (2016) Offensive assistant; Notre Dame (2017–2022); Quarterbacks coach (2017–2019); Offensive coordinator & quarterbacks coach (2020–2022); Alabama (2023) Offensive coordinator & quarterbacks coach; Cleveland Browns (2024–2025); Pass game specialist & tight ends coach (2024); Offensive coordinator (2025); Atlanta Falcons (2026–present) Offensive coordinator
- Coaching profile at Pro Football Reference

Thomas Kevin Rees (born May 22, 1992) is an American professional football coach and former quarterback who is the offensive coordinator for the Atlanta Falcons of the National Football League (NFL). He previously served as the offensive coordinator for the Cleveland Browns in 2025. He played college football at Notre Dame from 2010 to 2013.

Rees began his coaching career in 2015 as a graduate assistant at Northwestern University. He then served as an offensive assistant for the San Diego Chargers in 2016. Rees then coached at the University of Notre Dame from 2017 to 2022 and then at the University of Alabama in 2023.

== Early life ==
Rees was born to Bill and Susan (née Cantwell) Rees in Los Angeles, California and grew up in Lake Bluff, Illinois. His father played college football at Ohio Wesleyan and served as an assistant coach at Northwestern and UCLA. Tommy played football at Lake Forest High School. As a senior in 2009, he completed 215 of 308 passes for 2,572 yards and 23 touchdowns while only throwing 3 interceptions the entire season. Rees had several explosive games including a 526-yard, six-touchdown performance against Bradford. His brother Danny Rees played football at UCLA.

Rees was rated a three-star recruit by ESPN and Rivals.com, and signed with the Notre Dame Fighting Irish in July 2009.

== Playing career ==
=== College ===
==== 2010 season ====
As a freshman at Notre Dame, Rees saw limited action in games against Michigan and Navy, before being forced into action early against Tulsa when starting quarterback Dayne Crist ruptured his patellar tendon. Rees finished the game with 334 yards and four touchdown passes but threw a costly interception in the waning minutes of the game which sealed the victory for the Golden Hurricane. Rees led the Irish to victories in his first four starts at quarterback, including upsets of Utah and USC, culminating in a 33–17 victory over Miami in the Sun Bowl. He finished the season with 1,106 yards passing, 12 touchdowns, and eight interceptions.

==== 2011 season ====
In the 2011 season, Rees passed for 2,869 yards, 20 touchdowns, and 14 interceptions. Notre Dame went 8–4 in the regular season with a bowl loss. Andrew Hendrix and Everett Golson competed with Rees for the starting QB position in the 2012 season.

After Michigan's comeback in the September 10 rivalry game, the derisive nickname "Turnover Tommy" began to circulate, which stuck with Rees following his performance in 2011, and through his college career. Despite this reputation, Rees finished the season with a completion percentage of 65.5%, a second to the Irish record of 68% held by Jimmy Clausen. Rees' 14 interceptions this season was a tie for 11th in the FBS.

==== 2012 season ====
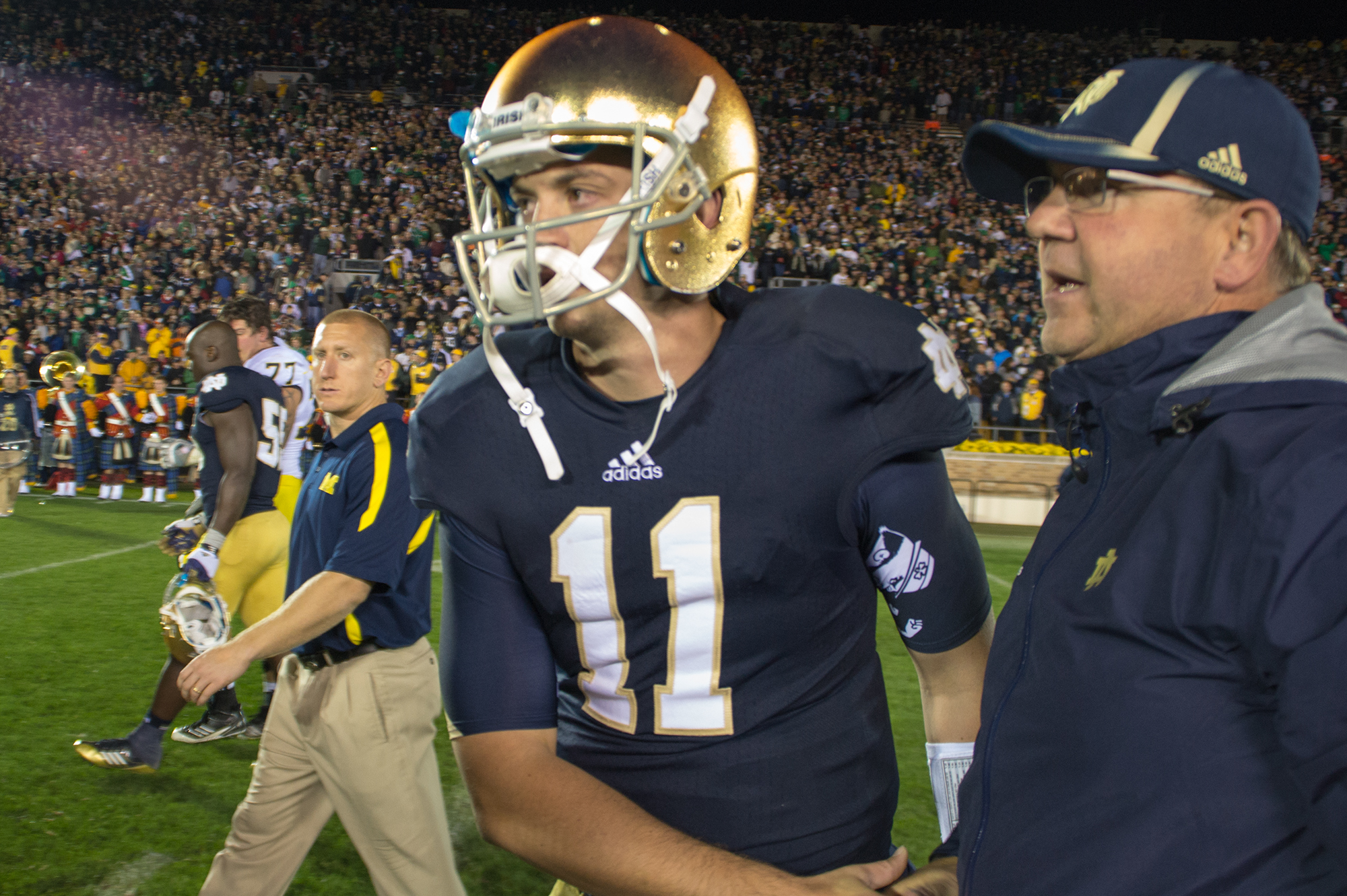
Rees in 2012

Rees was suspended by head coach Brian Kelly for the first game of the 2012 season after the junior quarterback was arrested and charged with resisting law enforcement and illegal consumption of alcohol by a minor after fleeing from an off-campus party. Everett Golson was named the starter for the opening game against Navy in Dublin, Ireland. Golson played most of the second game of the 2012 season against Purdue but was injured leading Rees to come in. Rees entered the game to a cascade of boos yet exited after piloting the game-winning drive, which ended with a winning field goal for Notre Dame. However, after the game, Kelly indicated that the team was staying with their initial starter, Golson, for the third game of the 2012 season at Michigan State. Rees started two games that year as Notre Dame made the BCS title game. All 13 games during the 2012 season were vacated soon after for use of ineligible players.

==== 2013 season ====
On June 5, 2013, it was announced Rees would start at quarterback for the 2013 season. He completed 197-of-367 passes for 2,938 yards, 27 touchdowns and 13 interceptions.

=== College statistics ===
Season	Team	Games		Passing							Rushing			
Season	Team	GP	GS	Cmp	Att	Pct	Yds	TD	Int	Avg	Att	Yds	TD	Avg
2010	Notre Dame	9	4	100	164	61.0	1,106	12	8	6.7	12	−2	0	−0.2
2011	Notre Dame	13	12	269	411	65.5	2,871	20	14	7.0	31	−56	0	−1.8
2012	Notre Dame	11	2	34	59	57.6	436	2	2	7.4	4	−13	1	−3.3
2013	Notre Dame	12	12	197	367	53.7	2,938	27	13	8.0	9	−62	0	−6.9
Career		45	30	600	1,001	59.9	7,351	61	37	7.3	56	−133	1	−2.4

=== National Football League ===
Pre-draft measurables
Height	Weight	Arm length	Hand span	Wingspan	40-yard dash	10-yard split	20-yard split	20-yard shuttle	Three-cone drill	Vertical jump	Broad jump
6 ft 1 1/2 in (1.87 m)	210 lb (95 kg)	31 1/8 in (0.79 m)	9 1/8 in (0.23 m)	6 ft 0 7/8 in (1.85 m)	5.11 s	1.69 s	2.91 s	4.45 s	7.32 s	31.0 in (0.79 m)	8 ft 9 in (2.67 m)
All values from Pro Day

After going undrafted in the 2014 NFL draft, Rees was signed by the Washington Redskins on May 10, 2014. He was released by the team on May 17.

== Coaching career ==
=== Northwestern ===
Rees began his coaching career at Northwestern, where he spent one season as an offensive graduate assistant for the 2015 team.

=== San Diego Chargers ===
On February 9, 2016, Rees joined the San Diego Chargers coaching staff as an offensive assistant.

=== Notre Dame ===
In January 2017, Rees returned to Notre Dame to be the quarterbacks coach. On January 14, 2020, Rees was officially promoted to offensive coordinator, replacing Chip Long. In his first season as offensive coordinator, the Irish finished the 2020 campaign 10–2 with a loss to eventual national champion Alabama in the College Football Playoff semifinal.

=== Alabama ===
On February 3, 2023, CBS reported that Rees had reached a deal with Alabama to become the offensive coordinator for the Crimson Tide.

=== Cleveland Browns ===
On February 5, 2024, Rees was hired by the Cleveland Browns as their pass game specialist and tight ends coach under head coach Kevin Stefanski.

On January 15, 2025, Rees was promoted to offensive coordinator, replacing Ken Dorsey. On November 3, Stefanski announced that Rees would assume play-calling duties beginning in the team's Week 10 game against the New York Jets.

=== Atlanta Falcons ===
On January 22, 2026, Rees was hired by the Atlanta Falcons as their offensive coordinator, reuniting with Stefanski, who the Falcons hired as their new head coach earlier that month.

== Personal life ==
Rees' father, Bill, works for the University of Notre Dame. His mother's name is Susan. He has an older brother, Danny, who played football at UCLA, and a sister named Meghan.
