= Robert Hughes (American football) =

American football player (born 1989)

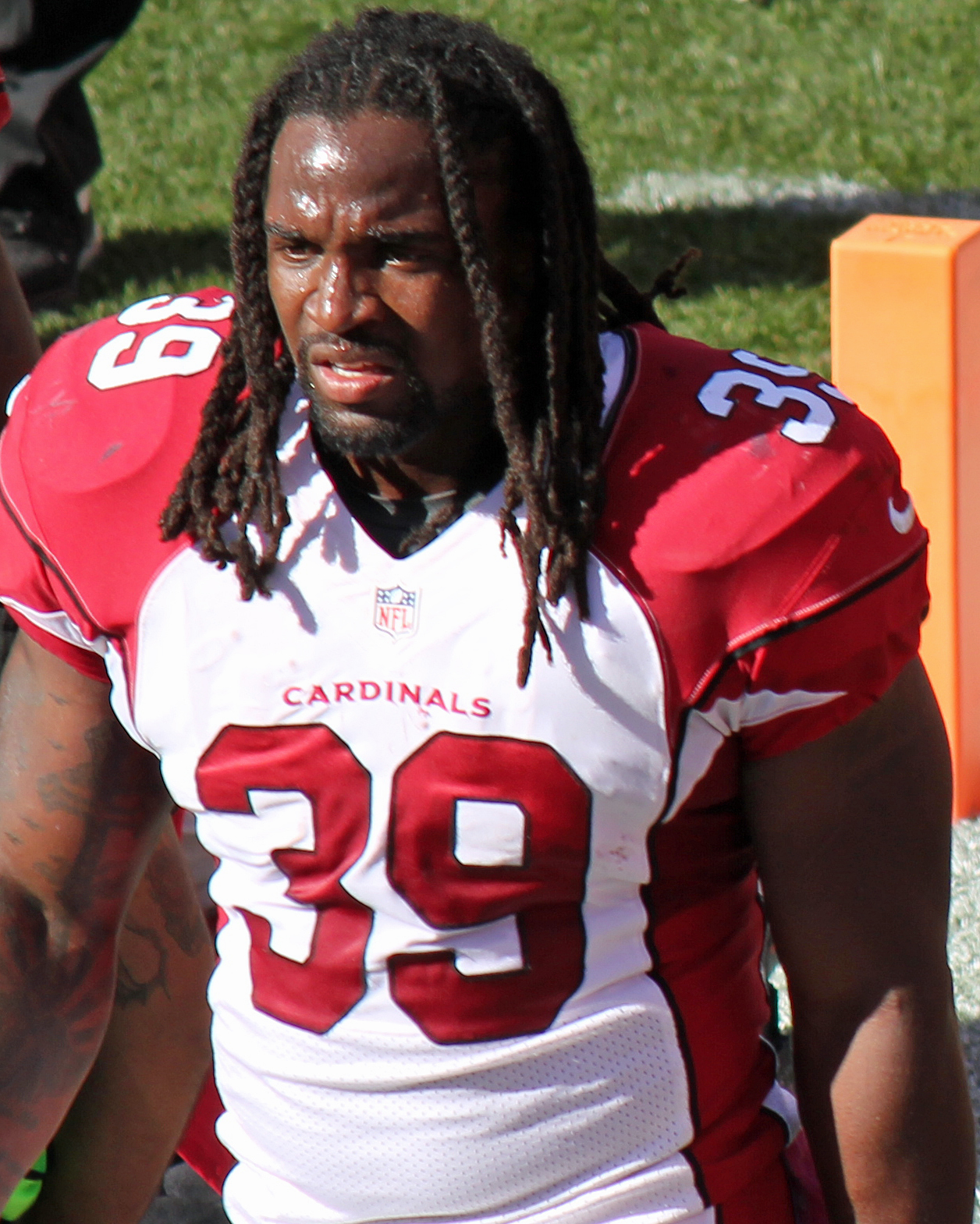
- Hughes with the Arizona Cardinals in 2014

No. 29, 39
- Position: Fullback

Personal information
- Born: June 21, 1989 (age 37); Chicago, Illinois, U.S.
- Listed height: 5 ft 11 in (1.80 m)
- Listed weight: 235 lb (107 kg)

Career information
- High school: Hubbard (Chicago)
- College: Notre Dame (2007–2010)
- NFL draft: 2011: undrafted

Career history
- Chicago Bears (2011)*; Tampa Bay Buccaneers (2012)*; Washington Redskins (2012)*; Indianapolis Colts (2012–2013); Arizona Cardinals (2013–2015); Cleveland Browns (2016)*
- * Offseason or practice squad member only

Career NFL statistics
- Rushing attempts: 8
- Rushing yards: 16
- Receptions: 10
- Receiving yards: 149
- Stats at Pro Football Reference

Robert Hughes (born June 21, 1989) is an American former professional football player who was a fullback in the National Football League (NFL). He played college football for the Notre Dame Fighting Irish, rushing for 1,392 yards on 321 attempts, as well as catching 43 passes for 370 yards. He was signed by the Chicago Bears as undrafted free agent in 2011.

He was also a member of the Tampa Bay Buccaneers, Washington Redskins, Indianapolis Colts, and Arizona Cardinals.

== Professional career ==
=== Chicago Bears ===
After not being drafted in the 2011 NFL draft, Hughes signed with the Chicago Bears on July 27, 2011. Despite running for 69 yards and two touchdowns on 16 carries, as well as having two receptions for 26 yards in the preseason finale against the Cleveland Browns, Hughes was cut by the Bears for final cuts before the start of the 2011 season.

=== Tampa Bay Buccaneers ===
Hughes signed with the Tampa Bay Buccaneers on April 19, 2012. Robert recorded stats in 2 preseason games for the Bucs totaling 2 carries for 4 yards (2.0 yards average) and 2 receptions for 23 yards (11.5 yards average). He was released by the team on August 31 during final roster cut downs before the start of the 2012 season narrowly missing making the team.

=== Washington Redskins ===
Hughes signed with the practice squad of the Washington Redskins on September 3, 2012. He was released on September 11, 2012.

=== Indianapolis Colts ===
Hughes was signed to the Indianapolis Colts practice squad on October 10, 2012. Hughes was activated from the practice squad 10/29/2012. Robert played in his first regular season NFL game November 4, 2012 against the Miami Dolphins and recorded his first statistic, a 3-yard reception from Andrew Luck in the first quarter of the Colts win over the Jacksonville Jaguars November 8th 2012. He later recorded his first rushing attempt, with a five-yard rush, November 18, 2012 vs. the New England Patriots. He was released on May 1, 2013. On August 5, 2013, Hughes was re-signed by the Colts.

=== Arizona Cardinals ===
On December 23, 2013, Hughes signed with the Arizona Cardinals practice squad. On September 5, 2015, he was released by the Cardinals. On October 22, the Cardinals signed him to their practice squad. On January 26, 2016, Hughes signed a futures contract with the Arizona Cardinals. He was cut on April 15, 2016.

=== Cleveland Browns ===
Hughes was signed by the Browns. On August 29, 2016, Hughes was waived by the Browns.
