= Armando Allen =

American football player (born 1989)

Armando Allen, Jr.
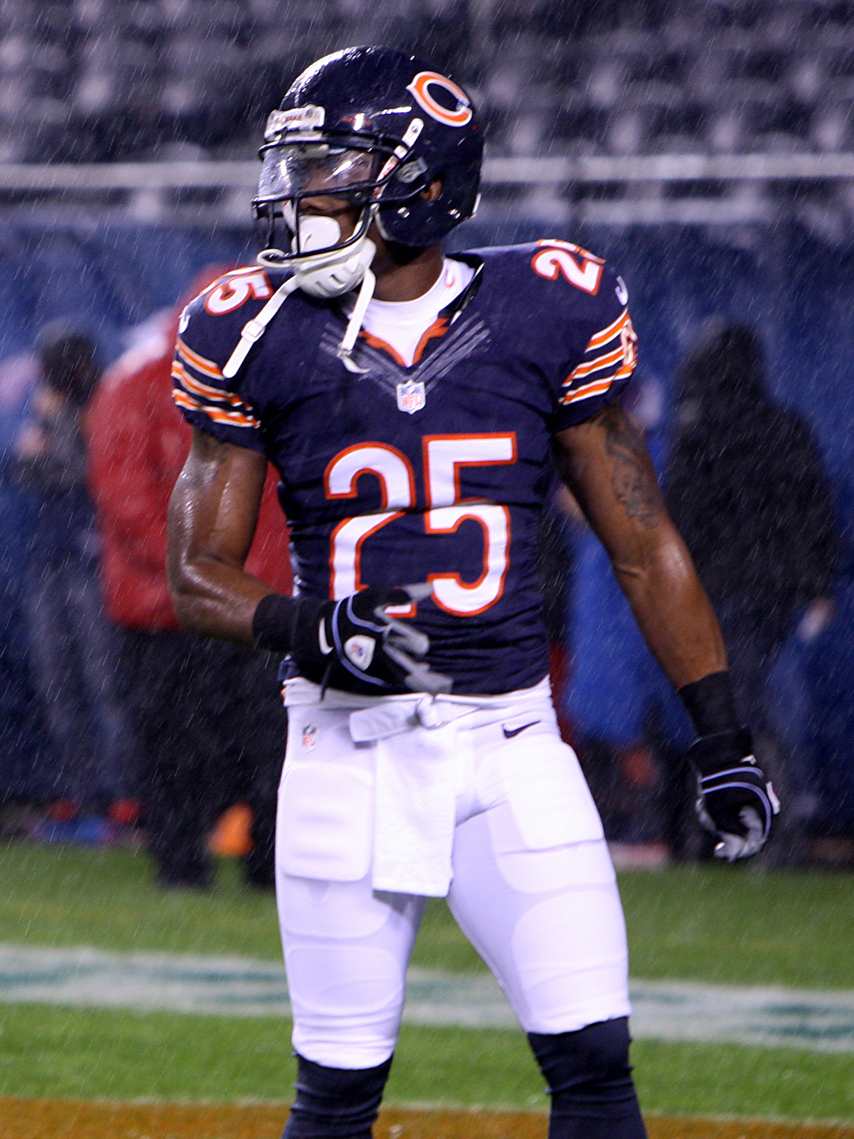
- Allen with the Chicago Bears in 2012

Profile
- Position: Running back

Personal information
- Born: April 30, 1989 (age 37); Opa-locka, Florida, U.S.
- Listed height: 5 ft 8 in (1.73 m)
- Listed weight: 199 lb (90 kg)

Career information
- High school: Hialeah-Miami Lakes (Hialeah, Florida)
- College: Notre Dame
- NFL draft: 2011: undrafted

Career history

Playing
- Tampa Bay Buccaneers (2011)*; Chicago Bears (2011–2012)
- * Offseason or practice squad member only

Coaching
- Hialeah HS (FL) (2013–2014) Running backs coach; Miami (OH) (2015) Graduate assistant; Texas Southern (2016–2018) Running backs coach; Charleston Southern (2019–2021) Running backs coach; Northwood Academy (SC) (2022) Offensive coordinator; Murray State (2023) Special teams coordinator & Running backs coach

Career NFL statistics
- Rushing attempts: 42
- Rushing yards: 172
- Rushing touchdowns: 1
- Receptions: 2
- Receiving yards: 16
- Stats at Pro Football Reference

Armando Allen, Jr. (born April 30, 1989) is an American former professional football player who was a running back for two seasons with the Chicago Bears of the National Football League (NFL). He played college football for the Notre Dame Fighting Irish and was signed by the Tampa Bay Buccaneers as an undrafted free agent in 2011. He was the Running Backs Coach and Recruiting Coordinator for Charleston Southern University from 2019–2021. Allen previously held the position of assistant coach at Texas Southern University.

== Early life ==
Allen played high school football at Hialeah-Miami Lakes High School in Hialeah, Florida. A preseason fractured fibula ended his 2006 senior season before it ever began. However, he rushed for 1,095 yards and 12 touchdowns as junior in 2005, despite missing three games to injury. He was selected for 2007 U.S. Army All-American Bowl in San Antonio but did not participate because of his injury. Considered a four-star recruit by Rivals.com, Allen was listed as the No. 2 all-purpose back in the nation. He chose Notre Dame over offers from Tennessee, Duke and Florida.

== College career ==
As a freshman, he started 4 games in which he recorded a team-best 1,176 all-purpose yards, averaging 98 yards per game. He was the second-leading rusher on the team with 348 yards on 86 carries. As a sophomore in 2008, he started 8 games in which he led the Irish in rushing with 585 yards on 134 carries (4.4 average) and added three touchdowns. He also ranked second on the team with 50 receptions and tallied 355 receiving yards and two touchdowns. As a junior, he only played in 8 games (7 starts) because of injury, but he was still able to lead the Irish in rushing for second straight season with 697 yards and three touchdowns on 142 carries. In his final season as a senior, playing in only 8 games due to a hip injury, ranked second on the team in rushing with 514 yards on 107 carries (4.8 average) and added two touchdowns.

He finished his 4-year career at Notre Dame rushing for 2,144 yards on 469 carries (4.6 average) and 8 touchdowns. He lived up to the hype as being an all-purpose back, by recording 4337 all-purpose yards, which is fifth most in school history. He graduated with a degree in sociology.

== Professional career ==
Pre-draft measurables
Height	Weight	Arm length	Hand span	40-yard dash	10-yard split	20-yard split	20-yard shuttle	Three-cone drill	Vertical jump	Broad jump	Bench press
5 ft 8 1/4 in (1.73 m)	199 lb (90 kg)	30 1/4 in (0.77 m)	8 3/4 in (0.22 m)	4.59 s	1.54 s	2.64 s	4.12 s	7.10 s	31.5 in (0.80 m)	10 ft 0 in (3.05 m)	23 reps
All values from NFL Combine/Pro Day

=== Tampa Bay Buccaneers ===
Allen was signed by the Tampa Bay Buccaneers as an undrafted free agent on July 27, 2011. However, he was waived during final cuts on September 3.

=== Chicago Bears ===
Allen was signed to the Chicago Bears practice squad on September 5, 2011. He was promoted to the active roster on December 19. Allen made his debut on Christmas Day against the Green Bay Packers and rushed for 40 yards on 11 carries. Allen lost the third running back battle to Lorenzo Booker, and was waived on August 31, 2012.

Allen scored his first career touchdown run against the Jacksonville Jaguars on October 7, 2012, the longest touchdown run by a Bears player since Matt Forte's 68-yard run in 2010. Though he became an exclusive rights free agent in 2013, Allen signed his tender on March 28. He was released on August 30, 2013.
