= Cierre Wood =

American football player (born 1991)

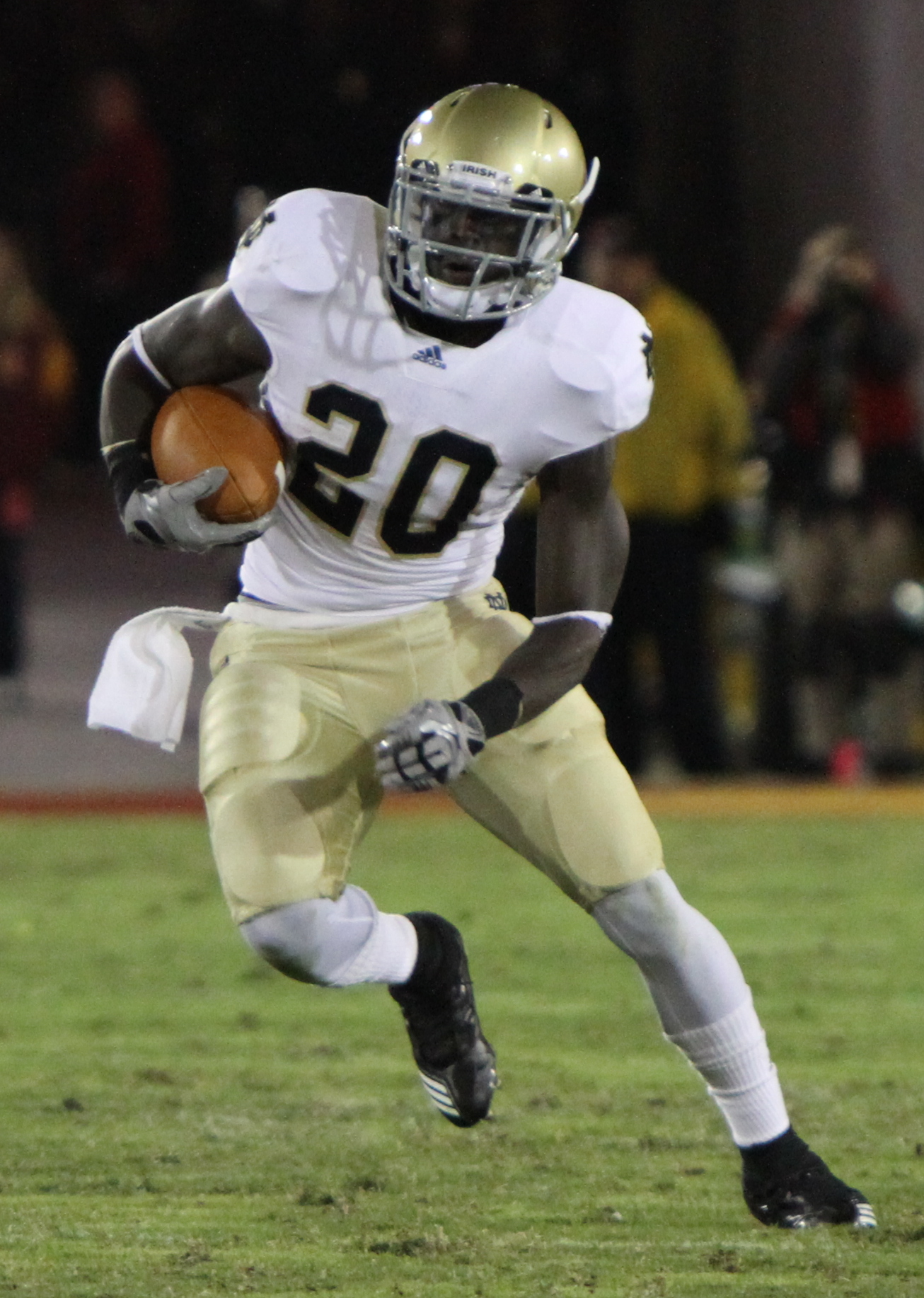
- Wood during his collegiate career with Notre Dame

No. 20, 41
- Position: Running back

Personal information
- Born: February 21, 1991 (age 35); Bloomington, California, U.S.
- Listed height: 5 ft 11 in (1.80 m)
- Listed weight: 226 lb (103 kg)

Career information
- High school: Santa Clara (Oxnard, California)
- College: Notre Dame (2009–2012)
- NFL draft: 2013: undrafted

Career history
- Houston Texans (2013); New England Patriots (2013)*; Baltimore Ravens (2014)*; Seattle Seahawks (2014)*; Buffalo Bills (2015); Hamilton Tiger-Cats (2017)*; Montreal Alouettes (2017); Winnipeg Blue Bombers (2018)*
- * Offseason or practice squad member only

Career NFL statistics
- Rushing yards: 12
- Rushing average: 2.4
- Receptions: 1
- Receiving yards: -6
- Stats at Pro Football Reference

Cierre Marcelle Wood (born February 21, 1991) is an American former professional football player who was convicted of murder. He played as a running back in the National Football League (NFL).

Wood played college football for the Notre Dame Fighting Irish. He was signed as an undrafted free agent by the Houston Texans in 2013. In 2024, he was sentenced to life in prison for the 2019 murder of his girlfriend’s five-year-old daughter.

== High school career ==
Wood attended Santa Clara High School in Oxnard, California. He rushed for 1,632 yards and 20 touchdowns and caught eight passes for 182 yards and four touchdowns as a senior. During his junior year, he had 2,612 yards rushing with 34 touchdowns. Wood was a USA Today All-American in 2008. He was also selected to play in the 2009 U.S. Army All-American Bowl in San Antonio, Texas.

Considered a four-star recruit by Rivals.com, Wood was listed as the No. 8 running back in the nation. He chose to attend Notre Dame over USC, UCLA, and California.

== College career ==
After redshirting in the 2009 season, Wood emerged on the depth chart as the No. 2 running back in 2010. He was used sparingly over the first few games, but after an injury to starter Armando Allen, he started the final six games where he recorded 603 yards on 119 carries and three touchdowns, and 20 receptions for 170 yards and 2 touchdowns. In his junior year, he took over the starting role. He recorded 1,102 yards on 217 carries (5.1 AVG) and 9 touchdowns, and 27 receptions for 187 yards. In 2012, Wood had been suspended for the opening two games, against Navy and Purdue, for violating team rules. In the final 11 games, he rushed for 742 yards on 114 carries (6.5 avg) and four touchdowns after splitting carries with classmate Theo Riddick.

== Professional career ==
In January 2013, Wood decided to forgo his final year of eligibility, entering the 2013 NFL draft.

Pre-draft measurables
Height	Weight	40-yard dash	10-yard split	20-yard split	20-yard shuttle	Three-cone drill	Vertical jump	Broad jump	Bench press
5 ft 11 in (1.80 m)	213 lb (97 kg)	4.46 s	1.56 s	2.52 s	4.29 s	6.87 s	37.5 in (0.95 m)	10 ft 4 in (3.15 m)	18 reps
All values from NFL Combine

=== Houston Texans ===
Wood went undrafted and was signed as a free agent with the Houston Texans hours after the draft. The Texans released Wood, along with two others players, on October 21, 2013, for unspecified violations of team rules prior to a game in Kansas City.

=== New England Patriots ===
The New England Patriots signed Wood to their practice squad on November 5, 2013. He was released by the Patriots on December 26.

=== Baltimore Ravens ===
Wood was signed by the Baltimore Ravens to a reserve-future deal on January 15, 2014. The Ravens released Wood on August 25.

=== Seattle Seahawks ===
Wood was signed by the Seattle Seahawks to their practice squad on November 12, 2014.

=== Buffalo Bills ===
The Buffalo Bills signed Wood to their roster on August 19, 2015. On September 4, he was released by the Bills. On September 6, the Bills re-signed Wood to their practice squad. Wood was promoted to the Bills' active roster on Friday, October 2. However, in Week 5, Wood tore his ACL, ending his season.

=== Hamilton Tiger-Cats ===
Wood signed with the Canadian football team, the Hamilton Tiger-Cats on March 9, 2017.

=== Montreal Alouettes ===
On May 1, 2017, Wood was traded to the Montreal Alouettes along with defensive end Denzell Perine, in exchange for defensive back Khalid Wooten. He was released on May 1, 2018.

== Personal life ==
Wood and his girlfriend, Amy Taylor, were arrested on April 10, 2019, by the Las Vegas Metropolitan Police Department on charges of first-degree homicide and child abuse, after the death of the girlfriend's five-year-old daughter, La’Rayah Davis, who was found with extreme bruising and trauma. Wood was additionally accused of forcing the child to participate in extreme exercise routines as a punishment for being overweight. On August 13, 2024, Wood was sentenced to life in prison with the possibility of parole after 12 years and four months, after entering an Alford plea to second degree murder and child abuse. He is currently incarcerated at Lovelock Correctional Center in Pershing County, Nevada.
