= 2015 Jacksonville Jaguars season =

21st season in franchise history

- Owner: Shahid Khan
- General manager: David Caldwell
- Head coach: Gus Bradley
- Offensive coordinator: Greg Olson
- Defensive coordinator: Bob Babich
- Home stadium: EverBank Field

Results
- Record: 5–11
- Division place: 3rd AFC South
- Playoffs: Did not qualify
- Pro Bowlers: WR Allen Robinson

Uniform
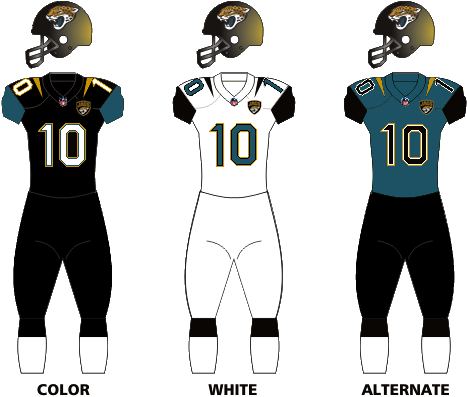

The 2015 season was the Jacksonville Jaguars' 21st in the National Football League (NFL) and their third under head coach Gus Bradley. The Jaguars improved on their 3–13 record in 2014, finishing with a 5–11 record and winning their most games in a season since 2011. While they improved upon their previous two seasons, the Jaguars were eliminated from playoff contention before their Week 16 loss to the New Orleans Saints when the Houston Texans defeated the Tennessee Titans earlier in the day.

== Offseason ==
=== Notable transactions ===
==== Acquisitions ====
- S Sergio Brown, signed on March 11, 2015.
- CB Davon House, signed on March 11, 2015.
- DT Jared Odrick, signed on March 11, 2015.
- OT Jermey Parnell, signed on March 11, 2015.
- LB Dan Skuta, signed on March 11, 2015.
- TE Julius Thomas, signed on March 11, 2015.
- C Stefen Wisniewski, signed on April 18, 2015.

==== Departures ====
- CB Alan Ball, became free agent on March 10, 2015. Signed on March 27 by the Chicago Bears.
- CB Will Blackmon, released on February 26, 2015. Signed on March 10 by the Seattle Seahawks.
- LB Geno Hayes, became free agent on March 10, 2015.
- WR Cecil Shorts III, became free agent on March 10, 2015. Signed on March 16 by the Houston Texans.
- FB Will Taʻufoʻou, became free agent on March 10, 2015.
- LB J. T. Thomas, became free agent on March 10, 2015. Signed on March 10 by the New York Giants.
- RB Jordan Todman, became free agent on March 10, 2015. Signed on March 30 by the Carolina Panthers.

==== Trades ====
- K Josh Scobee, the Jaguars' all-time leading scorer, was traded to the Pittsburgh Steelers on August 31, 2015 for the Steelers' sixth-round selection in the 2016 NFL draft.

=== NFL draft ===
2015 Jacksonville Jaguars draft
Round	Pick	Player	Position	College	Notes
1	3	Dante Fowler	Defensive end	Florida	
2	36	T. J. Yeldon	Running back	Alabama	
3	67	A. J. Cann	Guard	South Carolina	
4	104	James Sample	Safety	Louisville	
5	139	Rashad Greene	Wide receiver	Florida State	
6	180	Michael Bennett	Defensive tackle	Ohio State	
7	220	Neal Sterling	Wide receiver	Monmouth	
7	229	Ben Koyack	Tight end	Notre Dame	
Made roster † Pro Football Hall of Fame * Made at least one Pro Bowl during career

Draft trades

- The Jaguars traded their fourth-round selection (No. 103 overall) to the New York Jets for the Jets' No. 104, and No. 229 overall draft picks.
- Fowler tore his ACL on the first day of mini-camp and missed the entirety of his rookie season.

=== Undrafted rookie free agents ===
The following is a list of notable rookie free agents signed by the Jaguars after the 2015 NFL draft:

Player	Position	College	Status
Thurston Armbrister	Linebacker	Miami (FL)	Made 53-man roster
Corey Grant	Running back	Auburn	Made 53-man roster
Nick Marshall	Cornerback	Auburn	Made 53-man roster
Chris Reed	Guard	Minnesota State–Mankato	Made practice squad
Todd Thomas	Linebacker	Pittsburgh	Made practice squad

== Staff ==
2015 Jacksonville Jaguars staff
Front office: Owner – Shahid Khan; President – Mark Lamping; General Manager – David Caldwell; Special Assistant to the General Manager – John Idzik, Jr; Director of Football Administration – Tim Walsh; Director of Player Personnel – Chris Polian; Assistant Director of Player Personnel – Andy Dengler; Director of Pro Personnel – Chris Driggers; Director of College Scouting – Kyle O'Brien; Assistant Director of College Scouting – Paul Roell; Director of Player Development and Youth Football – Marcus Pollard; Assistant to the Head Coach and Administrator of Coaching Operations – ElizaBeth Mayers; Head coaches: Head coach – Gus Bradley; Assistant head coach/offensive line – Doug Marrone; Assistant to the head coach – Tyler Wolf; Offensive coaches: Offensive coordinator – Greg Olson; Quarterbacks – Nathaniel Hackett; Running backs – Kelly Skipper; Wide receivers – Jerry Sullivan; Assistant wide receivers/quality control – Tony Sorrentino; Tight ends/assistant special teams – Ron Middleton; Assistant offensive line – Luke Butkus; Senior offensive assistant – Frank Scelfo; Offensive coaching associate – Chris O'Hara	Defensive coaches: Defensive coordinator – Bob Babich; Run game coordinator/defensive line – Todd Wash; Linebackers – Robert Saleh; Assistant linebackers – Scottie Hazelton; Defensive backs – DeWayne Walker; Assistant defensive backs – Mike Rutenberg; Defensive assistant – Aaron Whitecotton; Defensive quality control – Dan Shamash; Special teams coaches: Special teams coordinator – Mike Mallory; Assistant special teams – Matthew Smiley; Strength and conditioning: Strength and conditioning coordinator – Tom Myslinski; Assistant strength and conditioning – Cedric Scott; Strength and conditioning associate – Alex Hampton; Strength and conditioning associate – Jess Langvardt

== Final roster ==
2015 Jacksonville Jaguars roster
Quarterbacks (QB): 5 Blake Bortles; 7 Chad Henne; Running backs (RB): 29 Joe Banyard; 34 Jonas Gray; 16 Denard Robinson; 24 T. J. Yeldon; Wide receivers (WR): 13 Rashad Greene; 88 Allen Hurns; 11 Marqise Lee; 15 Allen Robinson; 81 Bryan Walters; Tight ends (TE): 86 Clay Harbor; 85 Nic Jacobs; 89 Marcedes Lewis; 87 Neal Sterling; 80 Julius Thomas	Offensive linemen (OL): 68 Zane Beadles G; 70 Luke Bowanko C; 60 A. J. Cann G; 76 Luke Joeckel T; 78 Jermey Parnell T; 69 Tyler Shatley G; 61 Stefen Wisniewski C; 74 Sam Young T; Defensive linemen (DL): 93 Tyson Alualu DT; 94 Richard Ash DT; 96 Michael Bennett DT; 90 Andre Branch DE; 91 Chris Clemons DE; 59 Ryan Davis DE; 97 Roy Miller DT; 75 Jared Odrick DE; 98 Chris Smith DE	Linebackers (LB): 57 Thurston Armbrister OLB; 54 Joplo Bartu OLB; 51 Paul Posluszny MLB; 52 Hayes Pullard OLB; 55 Dan Skuta OLB; 50 Telvin Smith OLB; 58 Jordan Tripp MLB; Defensive backs (DB): 38 Sergio Brown FS; 22 Aaron Colvin CB; 37 Johnathan Cyprien SS; 26 Josh Evans FS; 27 Dwayne Gratz CB; 31 Davon House CB; 20 Craig Loston SS; 41 Nick Marshall CB; 35 Demetrius McCray CB; 25 Peyton Thompson SS; Special teams (ST): 19 Bryan Anger P; 2 Jason Myers K; 46 Carson Tinker LS	Practice squad: 10 Rasheed Bailey WR; 73 Kadeem Edwards G; 84 Shaq Evans WR; 48 Ben Koyack TE; 18 Rashad Lawrence WR; 53 Sean Porter OLB; 64 Chris Reed G; 92 Quanterus Smith DE; 44 Todd Thomas MLB (IR); 42 Earl Wolff SS; Reserve: 17 Arrelious Benn WR (IR); 14 Justin Blackmon WR (Susp.); 83 Damian Copeland WR (IR); 56 Dante Fowler DE (IR); 21 Toby Gerhart RB (IR); 33 Corey Grant RB (IR); 95 Abry Jones DT (IR); 65 Brandon Linder G (IR); 99 Sen'Derrick Marks DT (IR); 30 Bernard Pierce RB (IR); 23 James Sample S (IR); 12 Tony Washington WR (IR); 72 Josh Wells T (IR); Rookies in italics 53 active, 14 reserve, 9 practice squad

== Preseason ==
Week	Date	Opponent	Result	Record	Venue	Recap
1	August 14	Pittsburgh Steelers	W 23–21	1–0	EverBank Field	Recap
2	August 22	at New York Giants	L 12–22	1–1	MetLife Stadium	Recap
3	August 28	Detroit Lions	L 17–22	1–2	EverBank Field	Recap
4	September 3	at Washington Redskins	W 17–16	2–2	FedExField	Recap

== Regular season ==
=== Schedule ===
Week	Date	Opponent	Result	Record	Venue	Recap
1	September 13	Carolina Panthers	**L** 9–20	0–1	EverBank Field	Recap
2	September 20	Miami Dolphins	**W** 23–20	1–1	EverBank Field	Recap
3	September 27	at New England Patriots	**L** 17–51	1–2	Gillette Stadium	Recap
4	October 4	at **Indianapolis Colts**	**L** 13–16 (OT)	1–3	Lucas Oil Stadium	Recap
5	October 11	at Tampa Bay Buccaneers	**L** 31–38	1–4	Raymond James Stadium	Recap
6	October 18	**Houston Texans**	**L** 20–31	1–5	EverBank Field	Recap
7	October 25	Buffalo Bills	**W** 34–31	2–5	(United Kingdom) Wembley Stadium (London)	Recap
8	Bye					
9	November 8	at New York Jets	**L** 23–28	2–6	MetLife Stadium	Recap
10	November 15	at Baltimore Ravens	**W** 22–20	3–6	M&T Bank Stadium	Recap
11	November 19	**Tennessee Titans**	**W** 19–13	4–6	EverBank Field	Recap
12	November 29	San Diego Chargers	**L** 25–31	4–7	EverBank Field	Recap
13	December 6	at **Tennessee Titans**	**L** 39–42	4–8	Nissan Stadium	Recap
14	December 13	**Indianapolis Colts**	**W** 51–16	5–8	EverBank Field	Recap
15	December 20	Atlanta Falcons	**L** 17–23	5–9	EverBank Field	Recap
16	December 27	at New Orleans Saints	**L** 27–38	5–10	Mercedes-Benz Superdome	Recap
17	January 3	at **Houston Texans**	**L** 6–30	5–11	NRG Stadium	Recap

Note: Intra-division opponents are in bold text.

=== Game summaries ===
==== Week 1: vs. Carolina Panthers ====
Week One: Carolina Panthers at Jacksonville Jaguars – Game summary

Quarter	1	2	3	4	Total
**Panthers**	3	7	7	3	**20**
Jaguars	3	6	0	0	**9**

at EverBank Field, Jacksonville, Florida

- Date: September 13, 2015
- Game time: 1:00 p.m. EDT
- Game weather: 77 °F (25 °C)
- Game attendance: 60,733
- Referee: Ron Torbert
- TV announcers (Fox): Chris Myers, Ronde Barber, and Jennifer Hale
- Recap, Game Book

Game information

**First quarter**

- CAR – Graham Gano 43-yard field goal, 7:49. Panthers 3–0. **Drive: 14 plays, 45 yards, 5:47.**
- JAX – Jason Myers 22-yard field goal, 0:59. Tied 3–3. **Drive: 11 plays, 54 yards, 4:26.**

**Second quarter**

- CAR – Jerricho Cotchery 7-yard pass from Cam Newton (Graham Gano kick), 1:52. Panthers 10–3. **Drive: 12 plays, 66 yards, 5:27.**
- JAX – Rashad Greene 1-yard pass from Blake Bortles (kick failed), 0:14. Panthers 10–9. **Drive: 9 plays, 65 yards, 1:38.**

**Third quarter**

- CAR – Josh Norman 30-yard interception return (Graham Gano kick), 9:01. Panthers 17–9.

**Fourth quarter**

- CAR – Graham Gano 47-yard field goal, 2:41. Panthers 20–9. **Drive: 15 plays, 64 yards, 8:07.**

**Top passers**

- CAR – Cam Newton – 18/31, 175 yards, TD, INT
- JAX – Blake Bortles – 22/40, 183 yards, TD, 2 INT

**Top rushers**

- CAR – Jonathan Stewart – 18 rushes, 56 yards
- JAX – T. J. Yeldon – 12 rushes, 51 yards

**Top receivers**

- CAR – Jerricho Cotchery – 4 receptions, 45 yards, TD
- JAX – Rashad Greene – 7 receptions, 28 yards, TD

**Top tacklers**

- CAR – Thomas Davis – 7 tackles, 1 sack, INT
- JAX – Paul Posluszny – 8 tackles, 1 assist, INT

==== Week 2: vs. Miami Dolphins ====
Week Two: Miami Dolphins at Jacksonville Jaguars – Game summary

Quarter	1	2	3	4	Total
Dolphins	3	10	7	0	**20**
**Jaguars**	10	10	0	3	**23**

at EverBank Field, Jacksonville, Florida

- Date: September 20, 2015
- Game time: 4:05 p.m. EDT
- Game weather: 87 °F (31 °C)
- Game attendance: 65,443
- Referee: John Parry
- TV announcers (CBS): Andrew Catalon, Steve Beuerlein, and Steve Tasker
- Recap, Game Book

Game information

**First quarter**

- JAX – Allen Robinson 3-yard pass from Blake Bortles (Jason Myers kick), 9:21. Jaguars 7–0. **Drive: 10 plays, 82 yards, 5:39.**
- MIA – Andrew Franks 48-yard field goal, 7:16. Jaguars 7–3. **Drive: 5 plays, 50 yards, 2:05.**
- JAX – Jason Myers 27-yard field goal, 3:20. Jaguars 10–3. **Drive: 8 plays, 71 yards, 3:56.**

**Second quarter**

- MIA – Andrew Franks 41-yard field goal, 10:08. Jaguars 10–6. **Drive: 10 plays, 56 yards, 4:36.**
- JAX – Allen Robinson 46-yard pass from Blake Bortles (Jason Myers kick), 5:03. Jaguars 17–6. **Drive: 9 plays, 91 yards, 5:05.**
- MIA – Damien Williams 10-yard pass from Ryan Tannehill (Andrew Franks kick), 1:48. Jaguars 17–13. **Drive: 7 plays, 82 yards, 3:15.**
- JAX – Jason Myers 58-yard field goal, 0:00. Jaguars 20–13. **Drive: 3 plays, 27 yards, 0:18.**

**Third quarter**

- MIA – Jake Stoneburner 5-yard pass from Ryan Tannehill (Andrew Franks kick), 10:28. Tied 20–20. **Drive: 8 plays, 80 yards, 4:32.**

**Fourth quarter**

- JAX – Jason Myers 28-yard field goal, 0:40. Jaguars 23–20. **Drive: 9 plays, 66 yards, 1:08.**

**Top passers**

- MIA – Ryan Tannehill – 30/44, 359 yards, 2 TD
- JAX – Blake Bortles – 18/33, 273 yards, 2 TD

**Top rushers**

- MIA – Ryan Tannehill – 3 rushes, 17 yards
- JAX – T. J. Yeldon – 25 rushes, 70 yards

**Top receivers**

- MIA – Rishard Matthews – 6 receptions, 115 yards
- JAX – Allen Robinson – 6 receptions, 155 yards, 2 TD

**Top tacklers**

- MIA – Jelani Jenkins – 9 tackles, 3 assists
- JAX – Telvin Smith – 6 tackles, 3 assists

==== Week 3: at New England Patriots ====
Week Three: Jacksonville Jaguars at New England Patriots – Game summary

Quarter	1	2	3	4	Total
Jaguars	0	3	7	7	**17**
**Patriots**	10	10	17	14	**51**

at Gillette Stadium, Foxborough, Massachusetts

- Date: September 27, 2015
- Game time: 1:00 p.m. EDT
- Game weather: Clear and cool, 68 °F (20 °C)
- Game attendance: 66,829
- Referee: Walt Coleman
- TV announcers (CBS): Kevin Harlan and Rich Gannon
- Recap, Game Book

Game information

**First quarter**

- NE – Dion Lewis 8-yard run (Stephen Gostkowski kick), 11:55. Patriots 7–0. **Drive: 5 plays, 64 yards, 1:56.**
- NE – Stephen Gostkowski 46-yard field goal, 2:56. Patriots 10–0. **Drive: 10 plays, 62 yards, 4:23.**

**Second quarter**

- JAX – Jason Myers 40-yard field goal, 9:32. Patriots 10–3. **Drive: 17 plays, 58 yards, 8:24.**
- NE – Stephen Gostkowski 20-yard field goal, 3:42. Patriots 13–3. **Drive: 14 plays, 78 yards, 5:50.**
- NE – Danny Amendola 1-yard pass from Tom Brady (Stephen Gostkowski kick), 0:18. Patriots 20–3. **Drive: 8 plays, 57 yards, 1:29.**

**Third quarter**

- NE – Stephen Gostkowski 46-yard field goal, 10:50. Patriots 23–3. **Drive: 10 plays, 52 yards, 4:10.**
- NE – LeGarrette Blount 1-yard run (Stephen Gostkowski kick), 9:04. Patriots 30–3. **Drive: 1 plays, 67 yards, 0:47.**
- JAX – Allen Hurns 59-yard pass from Blake Bortles (Jason Myers kick), 6:15. Patriots 30–10. **Drive: 6 plays, 80 yards, 2:49.**
- NE – Keshawn Martin 13-yard pass from Tom Brady (Stephen Gostkowski kick), 3:18. Patriots 37–10. **Drive: 7 plays, 80 yards, 2:57.**

**Fourth quarter**

- NE – LeGarrette Blount 1-yard run (Stephen Gostkowski kick), 14:57. Patriots 44–10. **Drive: 5 plays, 24 yards, 1:59.**
- NE – LeGarrette Blount 1-yard run (Stephen Gostkowski kick), 3:31. Patriots 51–10. **Drive: 17 plays, 58 yards, 9:47.**
- JAX – Clay Harbor 6-yard pass from Blake Bortles (Jason Myers kick), 1:22. Patriots 51–17. **Drive: 7 plays, 80 yards, 2:09.**

**Top passers**

- JAX – Blake Bortles – 17/33, 242 yards, 2 TD, INT
- NE – Tom Brady – 33/42, 358 yards, 2 TD

**Top rushers**

- JAX – T. J. Yeldon – 11 rushes, 33 yards
- NE – LeGarrette Blount – 18 rushes, 78 yards, 3 TD

**Top receivers**

- JAX – Allen Hurns – 2 receptions, 70 yards, TD
- NE – Rob Gronkowski – 4 receptions, 101 yards

**Top tacklers**

- JAX – Paul Posluszny – 14 tackles, 4 assist
- NE – Jamie Collins – 4 tackles, 1 assist, forced fumble

==== Week 4: at Indianapolis Colts ====
Week Four: Jacksonville Jaguars at Indianapolis Colts – Game summary

Quarter	1	2	3	4	OT	Total
Jaguars	3	10	0	0	0	**13**
**Colts**	3	7	0	3	3	**16**

at Lucas Oil Stadium, Indianapolis, Indiana

- Date: October 4, 2015
- Game time: 1:00 p.m. EDT
- Game weather: Partly cloudy, 62 °F (17 °C)
- Game attendance: 65,609
- Referee: Ed Hochuli
- TV announcers (CBS): Tom McCarthy and Adam Archuleta
- Recap, Game Book

Game information

**First quarter**

- IND – Adam Vinatieri 54-yard field goal, 4:59. Colts 3–0. **Drive: 12 plays, 55 yards, 5:26.**
- JAX – Jason Myers 20-yard field goal, 2:49. Tied 3–3. **Drive: 6 plays, 78 yards, 2:10.**

**Second quarter**

- JAX – Allen Hurns 8-yard pass from Blake Bortles (Jason Myers kick), 11:37. Jaguars 10–3. **Drive: 4 plays, 44 yards, 2:00.**
- IND – Coby Fleener 2-yard pass from Matt Hasselbeck (Adam Vinatieri kick), 6:04. Tied 10–10. **Drive: 13 plays, 80 yards, 5:33.**
- JAX – Jason Myers 32-yard field goal, 0:04. Jaguars 13–10. **Drive: 14 plays, 65 yards, 6:00.**

**Third quarter**

- No scoring plays.

**Fourth quarter**

- IND – Adam Vinatieri 32-yard field goal, 12:27. Tied 13–13. **Drive: 8 plays, 35 yards, 4:05.**

**Overtime**

- IND – Adam Vinatieri 26-yard field goal, 4:36. Colts 16–13. **Drive: 6 plays, 53 yards, 3:37.**

**Top passers**

- JAX – Blake Bortles – 28/50, 298 yards, TD
- IND – Matt Hasselbeck – 30/47, 282 yards, TD

**Top rushers**

- JAX – T. J. Yeldon – 22 rushes, 105 yards
- IND – Frank Gore – 17 rushes, 53 yards

**Top receivers**

- JAX – Allen Hurns – 11 receptions, 116 yards, TD
- IND – Coby Fleener – 9 receptions, 83 yards, TD

**Top tacklers**

- JAX – Johnathan Cyprien – 11 tackles, 3 assists
- IND – D'Qwell Jackson – 10 tackles, 7 assist

==== Week 5: at Tampa Bay Buccaneers ====
Week Five: Jacksonville Jaguars at Tampa Bay Buccaneers – Game summary

Quarter	1	2	3	4	Total
Jaguars	0	14	10	7	**31**
**Buccaneers**	3	17	11	7	**38**

at Raymond James Stadium, Tampa, Florida

- Date: October 11, 2015
- Game time: 1:00 p.m. EDT
- Game weather: Clear, 84 °F (29 °C)
- Game attendance: 58,490
- Referee: Jerome Boger
- TV announcers (CBS): Spero Dedes and Solomon Wilcots
- Recap, Game Book

Game information

**First quarter**

- TB – Connor Barth 35-yard field goal, 10:16. Buccaneers 3–0. **Drive: 9 plays, 62 yards, 4:44.**

**Second quarter**

- JAX – Allen Hurns 12-yard pass from Blake Bortles (Jason Myers kick), 14:20. Jaguars 7–3. **Drive: 10 plays, 78 yards, 5:10.**
- TB – Connor Barth 45-yard field goal, 10:39 Jaguars 7–6. **Drive: 7 plays, 53 yards, 3:41.**
- TB – Doug Martin 10-yard pass from Jameis Winston (Connor Barth kick), 7:26. Buccaneers 13–7. **Drive: 3 plays, 17 yards, 1:33.**
- TB – Doug Martin 1-yard run (Connor Barth kick), 2:26. Buccaneers 20–7. **Drive: 6 plays, 41 yards, 3:26.**
- JAX – Allen Robinson 13-yard pass from Blake Bortles (Jason Myers kick), 0:36. Buccaneers 20–14. **Drive: 7 plays, 78 yards, 1:50.**

**Third quarter**

- JAX – Jason Myers 31-yard field goal, 10:03. Buccaneers 20–17. **Drive: 11 plays, 50 yards, 4:57.**
- JAX – T. J. Yeldon 5-yard pass from Blake Bortles (Jason Myers kick), 2:57. Jaguars 24–20. **Drive: 6 plays, 61 yards, 3:22.**
- TB – Connor Barth 47-yard field goal, 0:29. Jaguars 24–23. **Drive: 7 plays, 51 yards, 2:28.**
- TB – Jacquies Smith 3-yard fumble return (pass succeeded), 0:15. Buccaneers 31–24.

**Fourth quarter**

- TB – Doug Martin 1-yard run (Connor Barth kick), 8:26. Buccaneers 38–24. **Drive: 8 plays, 40 yards, 5:01.**
- JAX – Allen Robinson 5-yard pass from Blake Bortles (Jason Myers kick), 1:05. Buccaneers 38–31. **Drive: 7 plays, 86 yards, 1:45.**

**Top passers**

- JAX – Blake Bortles – 23/33, 303 yards, 4 TD, INT
- TB – Jameis Winston – 13/19, 209 yards, TD

**Top rushers**

- JAX – T. J. Yeldon – 11 rushes, 32 yards
- TB – Doug Martin – 24 rushes, 123 yards, 2 TD

**Top receivers**

- JAX – Allen Hurns – 5 receptions, 116 yards, TD
- TB – Charles Sims – 4 receptions, 85 yards

**Top tacklers**

- JAX – Telvin Smith – 13 tackles, 1 assist
- TB – Lavonte David – 8 tackles, 1 assist, 1 sack

==== Week 6: vs. Houston Texans ====
Week Six: Houston Texans at Jacksonville Jaguars – Game summary

Quarter	1	2	3	4	Total
**Texans**	7	3	0	21	**31**
Jaguars	0	7	7	6	**20**

at EverBank Field, Jacksonville, Florida

- Date: October 18, 2015
- Game time: 1:00 p.m. EDT
- Game weather: 73 °F (23 °C)
- Game attendance: 58,085
- Referee: Brad Allen
- TV announcers (CBS): Tom McCarthy and Adam Archuleta
- Recap, Game Book

Game information

**First quarter**

- HOU – Arian Foster 14-yard pass from Brian Hoyer (Nick Novak kick), 1:36. Texans 7–0. **Drive: 16 plays, 99 yards, 8:24.**

**Second quarter**

- JAX – Allen Robinson 2-yard pass from Blake Bortles (Jason Myers kick), 9:41. Tied 7–7. **Drive: 14 plays, 75 yards, 6:55.**
- HOU – Nick Novak 41-yard field goal, 6:38. Texans 10–7. **Drive: 9 plays, 55 yards, 3:03.**

**Third quarter**

- JAX – Julius Thomas 29-yard pass from Blake Bortles (Jason Myers kick), 0:05. Jaguars 14–10. **Drive: 4 plays, 52 yards, 1:32.**

**Fourth quarter**

- HOU – DeAndre Hopkins 9-yard pass from Brian Hoyer (Nick Novak kick), 11:20. Texans 17–14. **Drive: 9 plays, 81 yards, 3:45.**
- HOU – DeAndre Hopkins 26-yard pass from Brian Hoyer (Nick Novak kick), 8:07. Texans 24–14. **Drive: 4 plays, 46 yards, 1:18.**
- HOU – Andre Hal 31-yard interception return (Nick Novak kick), 7:55. Texans 31–14.
- JAX – Allen Hurns 11-yard pass from Blake Bortles (kick failed), 4:32. Texans 31–20. **Drive: 12 plays, 80 yards, 3:23.**

**Top passers**

- HOU – Brian Hoyer – 24/36, 293 yards, 3 TD
- JAX – Blake Bortles – 30/53, 331 yards, 3 TD, 3 INT

**Top rushers**

- HOU – Arian Foster – 18 rushes, 53 yards
- JAX – Blake Bortles – 4 rushes, 37 yards

**Top receivers**

- HOU – DeAndre Hopkins – 10 receptions, 148 yards, 2 TD
- JAX – Bryan Walters – 8 receptions, 87 yards

**Top tacklers**

- HOU – Brian Cushing – 9 tackles, 3 assists
- JAX – Paul Posluszny – 9 tackles, 1 assist

==== Week 7: vs. Buffalo Bills ====
NFL International Series

Week Seven: Buffalo Bills at Jacksonville Jaguars – Game summary

Quarter	1	2	3	4	Total
Bills	3	10	0	18	**31**
**Jaguars**	0	27	0	7	**34**

at Wembley Stadium, London, England

- Date: October 25, 2015
- Game time: 1:30 p.m. GMT/9:30 a.m. EDT
- Game weather: Sunny intervals, 48 °F (9 °C)
- Game attendance: 84,021
- Referee: Terry McAulay
- TV announcers (Yahoo! Screen, WJAX-TV): Kevin Harlan, Rich Gannon, and Jamie Erdahl
- Recap, Game Book

Game information

**First quarter**

- BUF – Dan Carpenter 31-yard field goal, 7:26. Bills 3–0. **Drive: 7 plays, 43 yards, 2:38.**

**Second quarter**

- JAX – Allen Robinson 10-yard pass from Blake Bortles (Jason Myers kick), 14:05. Jaguars 7–3. **Drive: 7 plays, 73 yards, 3:08.**
- JAX – Chris Clemons 6-yard fumble return (Jason Myers kick), 12:21. Jaguars 14–3.
- JAX – Telvin Smith 26-yard interception return (Jason Myers kick), 12:14. Jaguars 21–3.
- JAX – T. J. Yeldon 28-yard run (kick failed), 8:25. Jaguars 27–3. **Drive: 3 plays, 36 yards, 1:30.**
- BUF – Robert Woods 16-yard pass from EJ Manuel (Dan Carpenter kick), 2:46. Jaguars 27–10. **Drive: 12 plays, 85 yards, 5:39.**
- BUF – Dan Carpenter 38-yard field goal, 0:08. Jaguars 27–13. **Drive: 7 plays, 30 yards, 1:30.**

**Third quarter**

- No scoring plays.

**Fourth quarter**

- BUF – Dan Carpenter 26-yard field goal, 14:50. Jaguars 27–16. **Drive: 14 plays, 91 yards, 5:40.**
- BUF – Marcus Easley 58-yard pass from EJ Manuel (LeSean McCoy run), 6:33. Jaguars 27–24. **Drive: 2 plays, 52 yards, 0:42.**
- BUF – Corey Graham 44-yard interception return (Dan Carpenter kick), 5:21. Bills 31–27.
- JAX – Allen Hurns 31-yard pass from Blake Bortles (Jason Myers kick), 2:16. Jaguars 34–31. **Drive: 7 plays, 84 yards, 3:05.**

**Top passers**

- BUF – EJ Manuel – 24/42, 298 yards, 2 TD, 2 INT
- JAX – Blake Bortles – 13/29, 182 yards, 2 TD, INT

**Top rushers**

- BUF – LeSean McCoy – 18 rushes, 68 yards
- JAX – T. J. Yeldon – 20 rushes, 115 yards, TD

**Top receivers**

- BUF – Robert Woods – 9 receptions, 84 yards, TD
- JAX – Allen Robinson – 6 receptions, 98 yards, TD

**Top tacklers**

- BUF – Corey Graham – 8 tackles, 1 assist, INT, TD
- JAX – Telvin Smith – 8 tackles, 1 assist, INT, TD

==== Week 9: at New York Jets ====
Week Nine: Jacksonville Jaguars at New York Jets – Game summary

Quarter	1	2	3	4	Total
Jaguars	3	7	3	10	**23**
**Jets**	14	0	7	7	**28**

at MetLife Stadium, East Rutherford, New Jersey

- Date: November 8, 2015
- Game time: 1:00 p.m. EST
- Game weather: Sunny, 56 °F (13 °C)
- Game attendance: 78,160
- Referee: Walt Coleman
- TV announcers (CBS): Greg Gumbel, Trent Green, and Jamie Erdahl
- Recap, Game Book

Game information

**First quarter**

- JAX – Jason Myers 45-yard field goal, 8:59. Jaguars 3–0. **Drive: 10 plays, 29 yards, 5:03.**
- NYJ – Eric Decker 7-yard pass from Ryan Fitzpatrick (Ryan Quigley kick), 5:08. Jets 7–3. **Drive: 6 plays, 51 yards, 3:51.**
- NYJ – Chris Ivory 1-yard run (Ryan Quigley kick), 0:43. Jets 14–3. **Drive: 6 plays, 31 yards, 2:43.**

**Second quarter**

- JAX – Allen Hurns 30-yard pass from Blake Bortles (Jason Myers kick), 0:14. Jets 14–10. **Drive: 2 plays, 50 yards, 0:12.**

**Third quarter**

- JAX – Jason Myers 39-yard field goal, 4:32. Jets 14–13. **Drive: 5 plays, 23 yards, 1:43.**
- NYJ – Chris Ivory 1-yard run (Ryan Quigley kick), 2:02. Jets 21–13. **Drive: 8 plays, 73 yards, 2:30.**

**Fourth quarter**

- JAX – Jason Myers 35-yard field goal, 10:18. Jets 21–16. **Drive: 9 plays, 73 yards, 2:55.**
- NYJ – Brandon Marshall 20-yard pass from Ryan Fitzpatrick (Ryan Quigley kick), 2:41. Jets 28–16. **Drive: 3 plays, 25 yards, 0:56.**
- JAX – Bryan Walters 20-yard pass from Blake Bortles (Jason Myers kick), 2:16. Jets 28–23. **Drive: 3 plays, 72 yards, 0:25.**

**Top passers**

- JAX – Blake Bortles – 24/40, 381 yards, 2 TD, 2 INT
- NYJ – Ryan Fitzpatrick – 21/34, 272 yards, 2 TD

**Top rushers**

- JAX – T. J. Yeldon – 14 rushes, 64 yards
- NYJ – Chris Ivory – 23 rushes, 26 yards, 2 TD

**Top receivers**

- JAX – Allen Hurns – 5 receptions, 122 yards, TD
- NYJ – Eric Decker – 6 receptions, 79 yards, TD

**Top tacklers**

- JAX – Johnathan Cyprien – 7 tackles, 6 assists
- NYJ – Dion Bailey – 3 tackles, 3 assists, 0.5 sack

==== Week 10: at Baltimore Ravens ====
Week Ten: Jacksonville Jaguars at Baltimore Ravens – Game summary

Quarter	1	2	3	4	Total
**Jaguars**	7	3	3	9	**22**
Ravens	0	14	0	6	**20**

at M&T Bank Stadium, Baltimore, Maryland

- Date: November 15, 2015
- Game time: 1:00 p.m. EST
- Game weather: Partly cloudy, 60 °F (16 °C)
- Game attendance: 70,837
- Referee: Pete Morelli
- TV announcers (CBS): Spero Dedes, Solomon Wilcots, and Chris Fischer
- Recap, Game Book

Game information

**First quarter**

- JAX – Allen Hurns 5-yard pass from Blake Bortles, 2:29. (Jason Myers kick), Jaguars 7–0. **Drive: 8 plays, 65 yards, 4:20.**

**Second quarter**

- BAL – Crockett Gillmore 10-yard pass from Joe Flacco, 11:32. (Justin Tucker kick), Tied 7–7. **Drive: 2 plays, 26 yards, 0:45.**
- JAX – Jason Myers 21-yard field goal, 3:28. Jaguars 10–7. **Drive: 15 plays, 77 yards, 8:04.**
- BAL – Maxx Williams 21-yard pass from Joe Flacco (Justin Tucker kick), 1:11. Ravens 14–10. **Drive: 7 plays, 80 yards, 2:17.**

**Third quarter**

- JAX – Jason Myers 45-yard field goal, 14:27. Ravens 14–13. **Drive: 3 plays, 0 yards, 0:24.**

**Fourth quarter**

- JAX – Allen Robinson 15-yard pass from Blake Bortles (pass failed), 13:01. Jaguars 19–14. **Drive: 5 plays, 37 yards, 1:00.**
- BAL – Chris Givens 14-yard pass from Joe Flacco (pass failed), 7:30. Ravens 20–19. **Drive: 10 plays, 80 yards, 5:31.**
- JAX – Jason Myers 53-yard field goal, 0:00. Jaguars 22–20. **Drive: 8 plays, 45 yards, 1:06.**

**Top passers**

- JAX – Blake Bortles – 22/45, 188 yards, 2 TD, INT
- BAL – Joe Flacco – 34/45, 316 yards, 3 TD, 2 INT

**Top rushers**

- JAX – T. J. Yeldon – 18 rushes, 61 yards
- BAL – Justin Forsett – 14 rushes, 53 yards

**Top receivers**

- JAX – Allen Hurns – 5 receptions, 62 yards, TD
- BAL – Kamar Aiken – 7 receptions, 73 yards

**Top tacklers**

- JAX – Telvin Smith – 5 tackles, 7 assists
- BAL – C.J. Mosley – 7 tackles, 1 assist

==== Week 11: vs. Tennessee Titans ====
Week Eleven: Tennessee Titans at Jacksonville Jaguars – Game summary

Quarter	1	2	3	4	Total
Titans	3	3	7	0	**13**
**Jaguars**	0	6	3	10	**19**

at EverBank Field, Jacksonville, Florida

- Date: November 19, 2026
- Game time: 8:25 p.m. EST
- Game weather: 75 °F (24 °C)
- Game attendance: 60,121
- Referee: Craig Wrolstad
- TV announcers (NFLN): Jim Nantz, Phil Simms, and Tracy Wolfson
- Recap, Game Book

Game information

**First quarter**

- TEN – Ryan Succop 47-yard field goal, 9:06. Titans 3–0. **Drive: 10 plays, 51 yards, 5:54.**

**Second quarter**

- JAX – Jason Myers 31-yard field goal, 14:50. Tied 3–3. **Drive: 11 plays, 73 yards, 5:30.**
- TEN – Ryan Succop 49-yard field goal, 10:58. Titans 6–3. **Drive: 9 plays, 48 yards, 3:52.**
- JAX – Jason Myers 32-yard field goal, 0:31. Tied 6–6. **Drive: 5 plays, 36 yards, 0:55.**

**Third quarter**

- JAX – Jason Myers 20-yard field goal, 8:10. Jaguars 9–6. **Drive: 13 plays, 78 yards, 6:50.**
- TEN – Marcus Mariota 23-yard run (Ryan Succop kick), 5:22. Titans 13–9. **Drive: 5 plays, 81 yards, 2:48.**

**Fourth quarter**

- JAX – Julius Thomas 5-yard pass from Blake Bortles (Jason Myers kick), 3:30. Jaguars 16–13. **Drive: 1 play, 5 yards, 0:04.**
- JAX – Jason Myers 36-yard field goal, 2:19. Jaguars 19–13. **Drive: 4 plays, 9 yards, 1:00.**

**Top passers**

- TEN – Marcus Mariota – 22/35, 231 yards
- JAX – Blake Bortles – 21/30, 242 yards, TD, INT

**Top rushers**

- TEN – Antonio Andrews – 15 rushes, 78 yards
- JAX – T. J. Yeldon – 14 rushes, 54 yards

**Top receivers**

- TEN – Delanie Walker – 8 receptions, 109 yards
- JAX – Allen Robinson – 5 receptions, 113 yards

**Top tacklers**

- TEN – Coty Sensabaugh – 6 tackles
- JAX – Telvin Smith – 8 tackles, 1 assist

==== Week 12: vs. San Diego Chargers ====
Week Twelve: San Diego Chargers at Jacksonville Jaguars – Game summary

Quarter	1	2	3	4	Total
**Chargers**	0	21	3	7	**31**
Jaguars	6	3	3	13	**25**

at EverBank Field, Jacksonville, Florida

- Date: November 29, 2015
- Game time: 1:00 p.m. EST
- Game weather: 75 °F (24 °C)
- Game attendance: 59,477
- Referee: Jerome Boger
- TV announcers (CBS): Spero Dedes and Solomon Wilcots
- Recap, Game Book

Game information

**First quarter**

- JAX – Jason Myers 22-yard field goal, 10:39. Jaguars 3–0. **Drive: 10 plays, 76 yards, 4:21.**
- JAX – Jason Myers 51-yard field goal, 4:43. Jaguars 6–0. **Drive: 8 plays, 53 yards, 3:41.**

**Second quarter**

- SD – Dontrelle Inman 2-yard pass from Philip Rivers (Josh Lambo kick), 14:21. Chargers 7–6. **Drive: 7 plays, 63 yards, 1:37.**
- JAX – Jason Myers 27-yard field goal, 7:04. Jaguars 9–6. **Drive: 6 plays, 36 yards, 2:02.**
- SD – Antonio Gates 9-yard pass from Philip Rivers (Josh Lambo kick), 1:50. Chargers 14–9. **Drive: 13 plays, 83 yards, 5:14.**
- SD – Antonio Gates 12-yard pass from Philip Rivers (Josh Lambo kick), 0:45. Chargers 21–9. **Drive: 3 plays, 22 yards, 0:16.**

**Third quarter**

- JAX – Jason Myers 28-yard field goal, 10:03. Chargers 21–12. **Drive: 7 plays, 33 yards, 2:27.**
- SD – Josh Lambo 28-yard field goal, 1:02. Chargers 24–12. **Drive: 13 plays, 56 yards, 6:30.**

**Fourth quarter**

- JAX – Julius Thomas 21-yard pass from Blake Bortles (Jason Myers kick), 10:58. Chargers 24–19. **Drive: 12 plays, 80 yards, 5:04.**
- SD – Steve Johnson 5-yard pass from Philip Rivers (Josh Lambo kick), 4:45. Chargers 31–19. **Drive: 14 plays, 80 yards, 6:13.**
- JAX – Allen Robinson 8-yard pass from Blake Bortles (kick failed), 1:21. Chargers 31–25. **Drive: 2 plays, 14 yards, 0:09.**

**Top passers**

- SD – Philip Rivers – 29/43, 300 yards, 4 TD
- JAX – Blake Bortles – 30/49, 329 yards, 2 TD, INT

**Top rushers**

- SD – Melvin Gordon – 14 rushes, 60 yards
- JAX – T. J. Yeldon – 9 rushes, 36 yards

**Top receivers**

- SD – Steve Johnson – 7 receptions, 92 yards, TD
- JAX – Julius Thomas – 9 receptions, 116 yards, TD

**Top tacklers**

- SD – Denzel Perryman – 6 tackles, 1 assist
- JAX – Paul Posluszny – 11 tackles

==== Week 13: at Tennessee Titans ====
Week Thirteen: Jacksonville Jaguars at Tennessee Titans – Game summary

Quarter	1	2	3	4	Total
Jaguars	0	12	7	20	**39**
**Titans**	7	14	0	21	**42**

at Nissan Stadium, Nashville, Tennessee

- Date: December 6, 2015
- Game time: 12:00 p.m. CST
- Game weather: Cloudy, 56 °F (13 °C)
- Game attendance: 57,355
- Referee: Gene Steratore
- TV announcers (CBS): Brian Anderson, and Chris Simms
- Recap, Game Book

Game information

**First quarter**

- TEN – Craig Stevens 10-yard pass from Marcus Mariota (Ryan Succop kick), 4:15. Titans 7–0. **Drive: 12 plays, 80 yards, 6:38.**

**Second quarter**

- JAX – Rashad Greene 2-yard pass from Blake Bortles (kick failed), 14:56. Titans 7–6. **Drive: 10 plays, 75 yards, 4:19.**
- TEN – Delanie Walker 7-yard pass from Marcus Mariota (Ryan Succop kick), 8:45. Titans 14–6. **Drive: 10 plays, 90 yards, 6:11.**
- JAX – T. J. Yeldon 1-yard run (pass failed), 1:52. Titans 14–12. **Drive: 8 plays, 66 yards, 3:45.**
- TEN – Antonio Andrews 1-yard run (Ryan Succop kick), 0:02. Titans 21–12. **Drive: 9 plays, 75 yards, 1:50.**

**Third quarter**

- JAX – Allen Robinson 1-yard pass from Blake Bortles (Jason Myers kick), 4:52. Titans 21–19. **Drive: 14 plays, 64 yards, 7:33.**

**Fourth quarter**

- TEN – Dorial Green-Beckham 47-yard pass from Marcus Mariota (Ryan Succop kick), 14:49. Titans 28–19. **Drive: 9 plays, 80 yards, 5:03.**
- JAX – Allen Robinson 8-yard pass from Blake Bortles (kick failed), 11:52. Titans 28–26. **Drive: 6 plays, 80 yards, 2:57.**
- JAX – Julius Thomas 9-yard pass from Blake Bortles (Jason Myers kick), 10:09. Jaguars 32–28. **Drive: 1 play, 9 yards, 0:04.**
- TEN – Marcus Mariota 87-yard run (Ryan Succop kick), 8:30. Titans 35–32. **Drive: 3 plays, 90 yards, 1:39.**
- TEN – Wesley Woodyard 3-yard fumble return (Ryan Succop kick), 7:46. Titans 42–32.
- JAX – Allen Robinson 5-yard pass from Blake Bortles (Jason Myers kick), 6:28. Titans 42–39. **Drive: 4 plays, 80 yards, 1:18.**

**Top passers**

- JAX – Blake Bortles – 24/36, 322 yards, 5 TD
- TEN – Marcus Mariota – 20/29, 268 yards, 3 TD, INT

**Top rushers**

- JAX – T. J. Yeldon – 15 rushes, 57 yards, TD
- TEN – Marcus Mariota – 9 rushes, 112 yards, TD

**Top receivers**

- JAX – Allen Robinson – 10 receptions, 153 yards, 3 TD
- TEN – Dorial Green-Beckham – 5 receptions, 119 yards, TD

**Top tacklers**

- JAX – Michael Griffin – 7 tackles, 2 assists
- TEN – Paul Posluszny – 10 tackles, 3 assists

==== Week 14: vs. Indianapolis Colts ====
Week Fourteen: Indianapolis Colts at Jacksonville Jaguars – Game summary

Quarter	1	2	3	4	Total
Colts	3	10	3	0	**16**
**Jaguars**	3	6	21	21	**51**

at EverBank Field, Jacksonville, Florida

- Date: December 13, 2015
- Game time: 1:00 p.m. EST
- Game weather: 79 °F (26 °C)
- Game attendance: 62,372
- Referee: Carl Cheffers
- TV announcers (CBS): Tom McCarthy and Adam Archuleta
- Recap, Game Book

Game information

**First quarter**

- JAX – Jason Myers 46-yard field goal, 11:17. Jaguars 3–0. **Drive: 9 plays, 52 yards, 3:43.**
- IND – Adam Vinatieri 25-yard field goal, 7:47. Tied 3–3. **Drive: 7 plays, 73 yards, 3:30.**

**Second quarter**

- IND – Adam Vinatieri 21-yard field goal, 13:47. Colts 6–3. **Drive: 10 plays, 65 yards, 4:22.**
- IND – Robert Mathis fumble recovery in the end zone (Adam Vinatieri kick), 1:56. Colts 13–3.
- JAX – Andre Branch 58-yard fumble return (kick failed), 1:01. Colts 13–9.

**Third quarter**

- JAX – Allen Hurns 80-yard pass from Blake Bortles (Jason Myers kick), 13:33. Jaguars 16–13. **Drive: 1 play, 80 yards, 0:12.**
- JAX – Rashad Greene 73-yard punt return (Jason Myers kick), 11:49. Jaguars 23–13.
- IND – Adam Vinatieri 33-yard field goal, 7:38. Jaguars 23–16. **Drive: 10 plays, 66 yards, 4:11.**
- JAX – Allen Robinson 4-yard pass from Blake Bortles (Jason Myers kick), 4:51. Jaguars 30–16. **Drive: 8 plays, 80 yards, 2:47.**

**Fourth quarter**

- JAX – Julius Thomas 3-yard pass from Blake Bortles (Jason Myers kick), 12:53. Jaguars 37–16. **Drive: 10 plays, 69 yards, 5:58.**
- JAX – Denard Robinson 1-yard run (Jason Myers kick), 5:59. Jaguars 44–16. **Drive: 7 plays, 57 yards, 5:12.**
- JAX – Blake Bortles 1-yard run (Jason Myers kick), 1:57. Jaguars 51–16. **Drive: 4 plays, 1 yard, 2:07.**

**Top passers**

- IND – Matt Hasselbeck – 18/35, 252 yards
- JAX – Blake Bortles – 16/30, 250 yards, 3 TD

**Top rushers**

- IND – Frank Gore – 16 rushes, 60 yards
- JAX – Denard Robinson – 14 rushes, 75 yards, TD

**Top receivers**

- IND – T. Y. Hilton – 4 receptions, 132 yards
- JAX – Allen Hurns – 3 receptions, 105 yards, TD

**Top tacklers**

- IND – D'Qwell Jackson – 7 tackles, 1 sack
- JAX – Telvin Smith – 8 tackles, 1 assist

==== Week 15: vs. Atlanta Falcons ====
Week Fifteen: Atlanta Falcons at Jacksonville Jaguars – Game summary

Quarter	1	2	3	4	Total
**Falcons**	7	10	0	6	**23**
Jaguars	0	3	14	0	**17**

at EverBank Field, Jacksonville, Florida

- Date: December 20, 2015
- Game time: 1:00 p.m. EST
- Game weather: 65 °F (18 °C)
- Game attendance: 64,016
- Referee: Bill Vinovich
- TV announcers (Fox): Dick Stockton, David Diehl, and Kristina Pink
- Recap, Game Book

Game information

**First quarter**

- ATL – Devonta Freeman 5-yard run (Shayne Graham kick), 10:48. Falcons 7–0. **Drive: 8 plays, 80 yards, 4:12.**

**Second quarter**

- JAX – Jason Myers 42-yard field goal, 14:05. Falcons 7–3. **Drive: 9 plays, 68 yards, 3:23.**
- ATL – Julio Jones 11-yard pass from Matt Ryan (Shayne Graham kick), 3:47. Falcons 14–3. **Drive: 11 play, 81 yards, 5:41.**
- ATL – Shayne Graham 34-yard field goal, 0:00. Falcons 17–3. **Drive: 1 play, 0 yards, 0:02.**

**Third quarter**

- JAX – Blake Bortles 1-yard run (Jason Myers kick), 10:40. Falcons 17–10. **Drive: 9 plays, 80 yards, 4:20.**
- JAX – Allen Robinson 10-yard pass from Blake Bortles (Jason Myers kick), 6:15. Tied 17–17. **Drive: 6 plays, 39 yards, 3:30.**

**Fourth quarter**

- ATL – Shayne Graham 33-yard field goal, 10:28. Falcons 20–17. **Drive: 7 plays, 47 yards, 2:56.**
- ATL – Shayne Graham 46-yard field goal, 1:42. Falcons 23–17. **Drive: 14 plays, 41 yards, 6:44.**

**Top passers**

- ATL – Matt Ryan – 22/35, 246 yards, TD, INT
- JAX – Blake Bortles – 23/38, 297 yards, TD, INT

**Top rushers**

- ATL – Devonta Freeman – 25 rushes, 56 yards, TD
- JAX – Blake Bortles – 6 rushes, 44 yards

**Top receivers**

- ATL – Julio Jones – 9 receptions, 118 yards, TD
- JAX – Julius Thomas – 6 receptions, 79 yards

**Top tacklers**

- ATL – Justin Durant – 7 tackles, 1 assist
- JAX – Paul Posluszny – 9 tackles, 1 assist, INT

==== Week 16: at New Orleans Saints ====
Week Sixteen: Jacksonville Jaguars at New Orleans Saints – Game summary

Quarter	1	2	3	4	Total
Jaguars	0	6	13	8	**27**
**Saints**	14	10	7	7	**38**

at Mercedes-Benz Superdome, New Orleans, Louisiana

- Date: December 27, 2015
- Game time: 3:05 p.m. CST
- Game weather: None (indoor stadium)
- Game attendance: 73,064
- Referee: Ron Torbert
- TV announcers (CBS): Andrew Catalon, Steve Beuerlein, and Steve Tasker
- Recap, Game Book

Game information

**First quarter**

- NO – Michael Hoomanawanui 17-yard pass from Drew Brees (Kai Forbath kick), 10:33. Saints 7–0. **Drive: 10 plays, 80 yards, 4:27.**
- NO – Brandin Cooks 71-yard pass from Drew Brees (Kai Forbath kick), 0:27. Saints 14–0. **Drive: 9 plays, 98 yards, 6:20.**

**Second quarter**

- NO – Tim Hightower 1-yard run (Kai Forbath kick), 10:37. Saints 21–0. **Drive: 5 plays, 43 yards, 2:42.**
- NO – Kai Forbath 37-yard field goal, 3:56. Saints 24–0. **Drive: 8 plays, 27 yards, 3:00.**
- JAX – Marqise Lee 2-yard pass from Blake Bortles (pass failed), 1:23. Saints 24–6. **Drive: 8 plays, 80 yards, 2:33.**

**Third quarter**

- JAX – Allen Hurns 6-yard pass from Blake Bortles (Jason Myers kick), 8:51. Saints 24–13. **Drive: 11 plays, 80 yards, 6:09.**
- NO – Travaris Cadet 44-yard pass from Drew Brees (Kai Forbath kick), 5:29. Saints 31–13. **Drive: 7 plays, 80 yards, 3:22.**
- JAX – Allen Robinson 90-yard pass from Blake Bortles (pass failed), 4:49. Saints 31–19. **Drive: 1 play, 80 yards, 0:40.**

**Fourth quarter**

- NO – Tim Hightower 5-yard run (Kai Forbath kick), 12:59. Saints 38–19. **Drive: 13 plays, 88 yards, 6:50.**
- JAX – Allen Hurns 20-yard pass from Blake Bortles (pass succeeded), 1:13. Saints 38–27. **Drive: 9 plays, 80 yards, 1:34.**

**Top passers**

- JAX – Blake Bortles – 27/35, 368 yards, 4 TD, 2 INT
- NO – Drew Brees – 25/36, 412 yards, 3 TD

**Top rushers**

- JAX – Jonas Gray – 5 rushes, 31 yards
- NO – Tim Hightower – 27 rushes, 122 yards, 2 TD

**Top receivers**

- JAX – Allen Robinson – 6 receptions, 151 yards, TD
- NO – Brandin Cooks – 5 receptions, 123 yards, TD

**Top tacklers**

- JAX – Johnathan Cyprien – 7 tackles, 2 assists
- NO – Brandon Browner – 7 tackles

==== Week 17: at Houston Texans ====
Week Seventeen: Jacksonville Jaguars at Houston Texans – Game summary

Quarter	1	2	3	4	Total
Jaguars	0	3	3	0	**6**
**Texans**	3	17	0	10	**30**

at Reliant Stadium, Houston, Texas

- Date: January 3, 2016
- Game time: 12:00 p.m. CST
- Game weather: None (retractable roof closed)
- Game attendance: 71,899
- Referee: Terry McAulay
- TV announcers (CBS): Spero Dedes and Solomon Wilcots
- Recap, Game Book

Game information

**First quarter**

- HOU – Nick Novak 29-yard field goal, 5:24. Texans 3–0. **Drive: 8 plays, 47 yards, 3:30.**

**Second quarter**

- HOU – Jonathan Grimes 12-yard pass from Brian Hoyer (Nick Novak kick), 14:14. Texans 10–0. **Drive: 10 plays, 79 yards, 4:33.**
- JAX – Justin Myers 43-yard field goal, 10:13. Texans 10–3. **Drive: 8 plays, 55 yards, 4:01.**
- HOU – Johnathan Grimes 1-yard run (Nick Novak kick), 5:37. Texans 17–3. **Drive: 6 plays, 42 yards, 2:17.**
- HOU – Nick Novak 51-yard field goal, 0:03. Texans 20–3. **Drive: 8 plays, 42 yards, 1:08.**

**Third quarter**

- JAX – Justin Myers 34-yard field goal, 0:43. Texans 20–6. **Drive: 4 plays, -3 yards, 1:51.**

**Fourth quarter**

- HOU – Nick Novak 51-yard field goal, 3:24. Texans 23–6. **Drive: 11 plays, 42 yards, 5:52.**
- HOU – Kareem Jackson 27-yard interception return (Nick Novak kick), 3:09. Texans 30–6.

**Top passers**

- JAX – Blake Bortles – 17/32, 239 yards, 2 INT
- HOU – Brian Hoyer – 25/40, 249 yards, TD, INT

**Top rushers**

- JAX – Jonas Gray – 9 rushes, 23 yards
- HOU – Alfred Blue – 21 rushes, 102 yards

**Top receivers**

- JAX – Allen Robinson – 5 receptions, 108 yards
- HOU – DeAndre Hopkins – 7 receptions, 89 yards

**Top tacklers**

- JAX – Johnathan Cyprien – 6 tackles, 8 assists
- HOU – J. J. Watt – 5 tackles, 3 assists, 3 sacks, 1 forced fumble

=== Standings ===
==== Division ====
AFC South
	W	L	T	PCT	DIV	CONF	PF	PA	STK
^{(4)} Houston Texans	9	7	0	.563	5–1	7–5	339	313	W3
Indianapolis Colts	8	8	0	.500	4–2	6–6	333	408	W2
Jacksonville Jaguars	5	11	0	.313	2–4	5–7	376	448	L3
Tennessee Titans	3	13	0	.188	1–5	1–11	299	423	L4

==== Conference ====
AFC
#	Team	Division	W	L	T	PCT	DIV	CONF	SOS	SOV	STK
**Division Leaders**
1 (Note: Denver finished ahead of New England and Cincinnati for the No. 1 seed based on head-to-head sweep. New England finished ahead of Cincinnati for the No. 2 seed based on record vs. common opponents — New England's cumulative record against Buffalo, Denver, Houston and Pittsburgh was 4–1, while Cincinnati's cumulative record against the same four teams was 2–3.)	Denver Broncos	West	12	4	0	.750	4–2	8–4	.500	.479	W2
2	New England Patriots	East	12	4	0	.750	4–2	9–3	.473	.448	L2
3	Cincinnati Bengals	North	12	4	0	.750	5–1	9–3	.477	.406	W1
4	Houston Texans	South	9	7	0	.563	5–1	7–5	.496	.410	W3
**Wild Cards**
5	Kansas City Chiefs	West	11	5	0	.688	5–1	10–2	.496	.432	W10
6 (Note: Pittsburgh finished ahead of the New York Jets for the No. 6 seed and qualified for the last playoff spot based on record vs. common opponents — Pittsburgh's cumulative record against Cleveland, Indianapolis, New England and Oakland was 4–1, while the Jets' cumulative record against the same four teams was 3–2.)	Pittsburgh Steelers	North	10	6	0	.625	3–3	7–5	.504	.463	W1
**Did not qualify for the postseason**
7	New York Jets	East	10	6	0	.625	3–3	7–5	.441	.388	L1
8 (Note: Buffalo finished ahead of Indianapolis based on head-to-head victory.)	Buffalo Bills	East	8	8	0	.500	4–2	7–5	.508	.438	W2
9	Indianapolis Colts	South	8	8	0	.500	4–2	6–6	.500	.406	W2
10	Oakland Raiders	West	7	9	0	.438	3–3	7–5	.512	.366	L1
11	Miami Dolphins	East	6	10	0	.375	1–5	4–8	.469	.469	W2
12 (Note: Jacksonville finished ahead of Baltimore based on head-to-head victory.)	Jacksonville Jaguars	South	5	11	0	.313	2–4	5–7	.473	.375	L3
13	Baltimore Ravens	North	5	11	0	.313	3–3	4–8	.508	.425	L1
14	San Diego Chargers	West	4	12	0	.250	0–6	3–9	.527	.328	L2
15 (Note: Cleveland finished ahead of Tennessee based on head-to-head victory.)	Cleveland Browns	North	3	13	0	.188	1–5	2–10	.531	.271	L3
16	Tennessee Titans	South	3	13	0	.188	1–5	1–11	.492	.375	L4
**Tiebreakers** (Note: When breaking ties for three or more teams under the NFL's rules, they are first broken within divisions, then comparing only the highest ranked remaining team from each division.)
