= Marqise Lee =

American football player (born 1991)

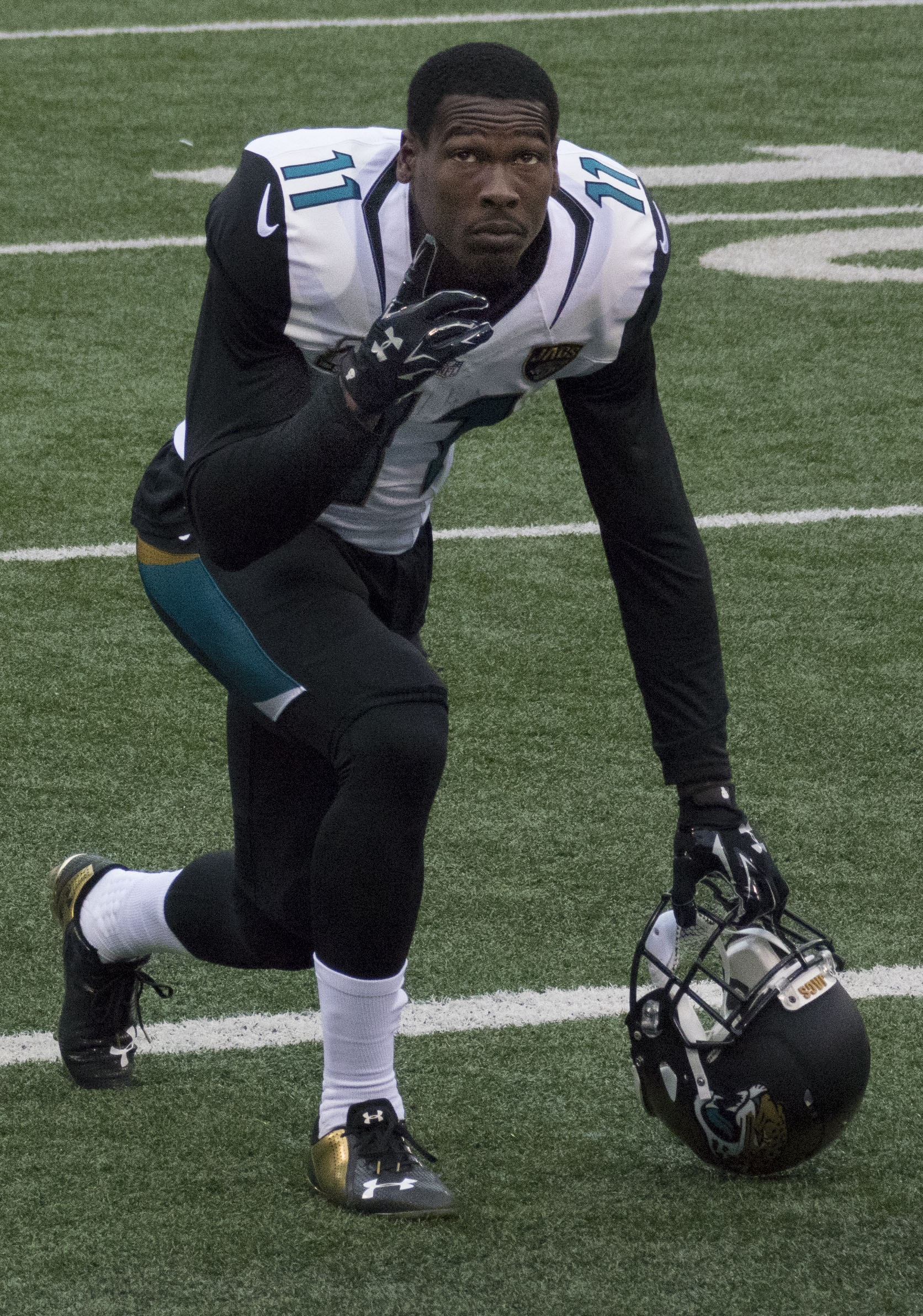
- Lee with the Jacksonville Jaguars in 2014

No. 11
- Position: Wide receiver

Personal information
- Born: November 25, 1991 (age 34); Long Beach, California, U.S.
- Listed height: 6 ft 0 in (1.83 m)
- Listed weight: 196 lb (89 kg)

Career information
- High school: Junípero Serra (Gardena, California)
- College: USC (2011–2013)
- NFL draft: 2014: 2nd round, 39th overall pick

Career history
- Jacksonville Jaguars (2014–2019); New England Patriots (2020); San Francisco 49ers (2021)*
- * Offseason or practice squad member only

Awards and highlights
- Biletnikoff Award (2012); Paul Warfield Trophy (2012); Unanimous All-American (2012); NCAA receptions leader (2012); Pac-12 Offensive Player of the Year (2012); First-team All-Pac-12 (2012); Second-team All-Pac-12 (2011); Pac-12 Co-Offensive Freshman of the Year (2011)

Career NFL statistics
- Receptions: 174
- Receiving yards: 2,184
- Receiving touchdowns: 8
- Return yards: 561
- Return touchdowns: 1
- Stats at Pro Football Reference

Marqise Lee (born November 25, 1991) is an American former professional football player who was a wide receiver in the National Football League (NFL), primarily with the Jacksonville Jaguars. He played college football for the USC Trojans, winning the Biletnikoff Award as the nation's top receiver and earning unanimous All-American honors in 2012. He was selected by the Jaguars in the second round of the 2014 NFL draft.

== Early life ==
Lee is a child of deaf adults; his parents, Elton Lee and Anfernee Williams, are deaf. He communicates with them via sign language. Lee had a difficult childhood. His father was not regularly involved in his life. Lee spent the first 12 years of his life moving repeatedly between his mother and grandparents, both low-income homes. The frequent moves forced him to repeat a grade early in elementary school. While Lee was finishing sixth grade, his grandfather died and his grandmother moved to the housing projects in Baldwin Village, Los Angeles; Lee and his younger sister chose not to move with her and instead became wards of the state. His two older brothers were involved in gangs: one, Terreal Reid, was murdered in a gang-related killing and the other, Donte Reid, was imprisoned in Arizona for attempted murder. Lee previously tried to join the same gang, but his brothers prevented it. His sister still lives in the Los Angeles area.

When Lee started high school at Morningside High School, in Inglewood, California, he was living in a foster home. Lee played on an Amateur Athletic Union basketball team the summer after his freshman year of high school and became friends with Steven Hester Jr., a high school student from Inglewood attending the private Junípero Serra High School in Gardena, California. The Hester family liked Lee and, in September 2008, he moved in with them and began attending Serra. The family wanted to help Lee's younger sister, too, but were unable because of space and financial constraints. The Hesters became heavily involved in his life and continued to attend most of his games and practices at USC.

At Serra High School, Lee was a year behind a stand-out wide receiver, Robert Woods, who also went to USC. As a senior, Lee had had 57 receptions for 1,409 yards and 24 touchdowns as a wide receiver and 45 tackles and three interceptions as a defensive back. Lee was considered one of the top high school recruits in 2011. A number of major NCAA Division I FBS college football programs offered him athletic scholarships and Lee made official visits to Florida, Miami, and Oregon before choosing to attend USC.

Lee was also a sprinter and jumper for the Junípero Serra High School's track team. He set a personal-best leap of 13.59 meters in the triple jump at the 2010 CIF Division IV Meet. At the 2011 CIF Division IV Meet, he won the long jump with a leap of 7.52 meters, and recorded a career-best time of 10.74 seconds in the 100-meter dash, placing second. His jump of 7.52 meters was ranked 2nd best among all the 2011 prep class. He also ran the 200-meter dash in 22.11 seconds at the 2011 Del Rey League Championships, placing third in the finals.

== College career ==
While attending the University of Southern California, Lee played for the USC Trojans football team from 2011 to 2013.

=== 2011 season ===
As a true freshman at USC in 2011, he earned a starting job at wide receiver across from his former high school teammate Robert Woods. He finished the season with 73 receptions for 1,143 yards and 11 touchdowns; due to sanctions, the 10-2 Trojans were prohibited from playing in either the inaugural Pac-12 Conference Championship game or a post-season bowl game. The combined receptions by Lee and Woods (184) and receiving yards (2,435) in 2011 were the most by a pair of Trojans in a season; Lee was awarded the 2011 Pac-12 Freshman Offensive Co-Player of the Year and named to the All-Pac-12 second-team.

=== 2012 season ===
Against Arizona in 2012, Lee set the Pac-12 Conference record for receiving yards in a game with 16 receptions for 345 yards and two touchdowns. The following week, Lee had 251 return yards against Oregon, setting another conference record. He finished the season with an NCAA-leading 118 catches for 1,721 yards and 14 touchdowns and was named the 2012 Pac-12 Conference offensive player of the year. Lee won the 2012 Fred Biletnikoff Award as the top wide receiver in the nation, becoming the first Trojan to win the award. He was also a unanimous All-American.

=== 2013 season ===
As a junior in 2013, Lee played in 11 games, recording 57 receptions for 791 yards and four touchdowns. On January 3, 2014, Lee announced his decision to forgo his senior season and enter the 2014 NFL draft. During his three-year career with the Trojans, he had 248 receptions for 3,655 yards and 29 touchdowns.

Lee also competed on the USC track & field team in the spring, competing in the long jump and sprint relay. He qualified for the NCAA championships in the long jump at the 2011 NCAA West preliminary rounds, setting a career-best leap of 7.76 meters.

== Professional career ==
External videos
- Marqise Lee NFL Combine Workout
- Marqise Lee 40-yard dash

Pre-draft measurables
| Height | Weight | Arm length | Hand span | Wingspan | 40-yard dash | 10-yard split | 20-yard split | 20-yard shuttle | Three-cone drill | Vertical jump | Broad jump | Bench press |
|---|---|---|---|---|---|---|---|---|---|---|---|---|
| 5 ft 11 3/4 in (1.82 m) | 192 lb (87 kg) | 31 3/4 in (0.81 m) | 9 1/2 in (0.24 m) | 6 ft 5 5/8 in (1.97 m) | 4.52 s | 1.59 s | 2.65 s | 4.01 s | 6.96 s | 38.0 in (0.97 m) | 10 ft 7 in (3.23 m) | 11 reps |
All values from NFL Combine/Pro Day

=== Jacksonville Jaguars ===
==== 2014 ====
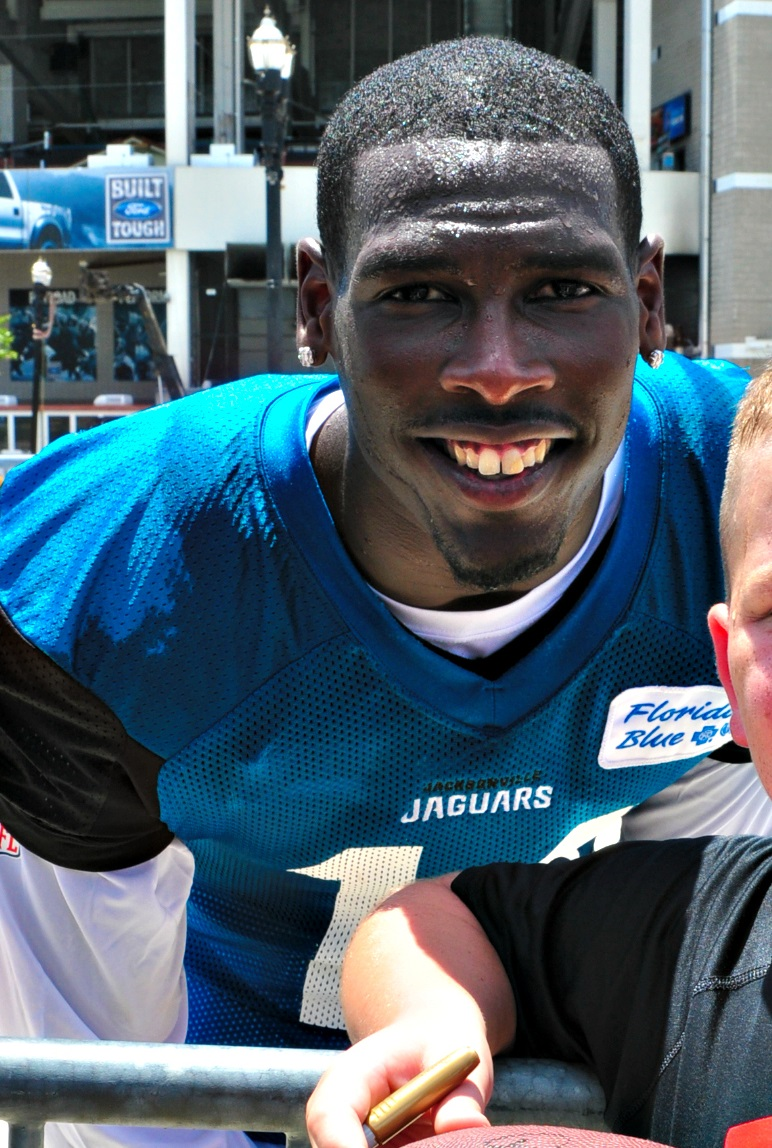
Lee at Jaguars training camp in 2014

The Jacksonville Jaguars selected Lee in the second round (39th overall) of the 2014 NFL draft. He was one of three USC Trojans to be selected that year and was the first of two wide receivers the Jaguars selected, along with Allen Robinson (61st overall). On June 16, 2014, the Jaguars signed Lee to a four-year, $5.14 million contract that includes $3.18 million guaranteed and a signing bonus of $2.08 million.

External videos
- Jacksonville Jaguars select Marqise Lee

Throughout training camp, Lee competed against Ace Sanders and Robinson for the vacant starting wide receiver position that was left open after the suspension of Justin Blackmon. During camp, he sustained a wrist injury and then suffered a leg injury. Head coach Gus Bradley named Lee the starting wide receiver to start the regular season, alongside veteran Cecil Shorts.

He made his professional regular season debut and first career start during the Jaguars' season-opener at the Philadelphia Eagles and caught a season-high six passes for 62-yards in their 34–17 loss. The following week, he left the Jaguars' 41–10 loss at the Washington Redskins in the second quarter after sustaining a hamstring injury that sidelined him for the next three games (Weeks 3–5). On November 30, 2014, Lee caught six passes for a season-high 75-yards and caught his first career touchdown on a 30-yard pass from quarterback and fellow rookie Blake Bortles during the Jaguars' 25–24 win over the New York Giants. He finished his rookie season and only season under offensive coordinator Jedd Fisch with 37 receptions for 422 yards and one touchdown in 13 games and eight starts.

==== 2015 ====
Lee competed against Robinson and Allen Hurns for the vacant starting wide receiver position left by the departure of Shorts. He missed the majority of training camp after suffering a knee injury and then suffered a hamstring injury that allowed teammates to surpass him on the depth chart. Offensive coordinator Greg Olson named Lee the fourth wide receiver on the depth chart to begin the regular season, behind Robinson, Allen Hurns, and Bryan Walters.

He was inactive for the Jaguars' season-opener against the Carolina Panthers due to his hamstring injury. He went on to miss another five games (Weeks 4–9) after aggravating his hamstring injury. He finished with his second season with 15 receptions for 191 receiving yards and one touchdown in ten games and one start.

==== 2016 ====
Lee entered training camp competing against Rashad Greene to be the Jaguars' third wide receiver on their depth chart. Head coach Gus Bradley named him the third wide receiver to begin the regular season behind Robinson and Hurns.

In Week 7, Lee made a season-high seven receptions for 107-yards during a 33–16 loss against the Oakland Raiders. Lee became one of the starting wide receivers for the remainder of the season after Allen Hurns suffered a hamstring injury that sidelined him for the last five games. On December 11, 2016, he caught five passes for a career-high 113 receiving yards in a 25–16 loss to the Minnesota Vikings. The following week, Lee returned a kickoff for a 100-yard touchdown as the Jaguars lost 21–20 at the Houston Texans. This marked his first career kick return for a touchdown. On December 24, 2016, he threw for his first career touchdown pass on a trick play call after receiving the football on a sweep and threw a 20-yard touchdown pass to a wide-open Bortles, his quarterback. He also caught three passes for 37-yards and scored a 21-yard touchdown during the Jaguars' 38–17 win against the Tennessee Titans. He finished his last season under head coach Gus Bradley with 63 receptions for 851 receiving yards and three touchdowns in 16 games and six starts. He also returned 18 kickoffs for 545-yards and a touchdown.

==== 2017 ====
On January 9, 2017, the Jacksonville Jaguars announced that interim head coach and offensive line coach Doug Marrone would be promoted to their full-time head coach for the 2017 season. Throughout training camp, Lee and Allen Hurns competed to be a starting wide receiver alongside Robinson. Offensive coordinator Nathaniel Hackett named Lee and Robinson the starting wide receivers to begin the season.

Lee finished the 2017 season with 56 receptions for 702 yards and three touchdowns in 14 games and 14 starts.

The Jacksonville Jaguars finished atop the AFC South with a 10–6 record and secured a playoff berth. On January 7, 2018, Lee started his first career playoff game and had a five-yard rush and was only targeted once in the Jaguars' 10–3 victory over the Buffalo Bills in the AFC Wild Card Round. The Jaguars defeated the Pittsburgh Steelers in the AFC Divisional Round and went on to lose 24–20 to the New England Patriots in the AFC Championship. Lee had four receptions for 42-yards during the Jaguars' playoff loss.

==== 2018 ====
On March 13, 2018, the Jaguars signed Lee to a four-year, $38 million contract extension. On August 25, 2018, in the third preseason game, Lee suffered a severe knee injury and had to undergo season-ending surgery.

==== 2019 ====
On October 29, 2019, Lee was placed on injured reserve with a knee injury. He finished the season with just three catches for 18 yards.

Lee was released by the Jaguars on April 20, 2020.

=== New England Patriots ===
On April 28, 2020, Lee signed a one-year contract with the Patriots. On August 2, he announced he would opt out of the season due to the COVID-19 pandemic. After opting out of the season, Lee was released on March 18, 2021.

=== San Francisco 49ers ===
On May 17, 2021, Lee signed a one-year contract with the San Francisco 49ers, but was released four days later.

On November 9, 2021, the Las Vegas Raiders hosted Lee for a workout.

== NFL career statistics ==
| Year | Team | Games | | Receiving | | | | | Rushing | | | | | Fumbles | |
| Year | Team | GP | GS | Rec | Yds | Avg | Lng | TD | Att | Yds | Avg | Lng | TD | Fum | Lost |
|---|---|---|---|---|---|---|---|---|---|---|---|---|---|---|---|
| 2014 | JAX | 13 | 8 | 37 | 422 | 11.4 | 37 | 1 | 3 | 9 | 3.0 | 5 | 0 | 0 | 0 |
| 2015 | JAX | 10 | 1 | 15 | 191 | 12.7 | 30 | 1 | 5 | 38 | 7.6 | 12 | 0 | 0 | 0 |
| 2016 | JAX | 16 | 6 | 63 | 851 | 13.5 | 51 | 3 | 6 | 35 | 5.8 | 11 | 0 | 1 | 1 |
| 2017 | JAX | 14 | 14 | 56 | 702 | 12.5 | 45 | 3 | 1 | 17 | 17.0 | 17 | 0 | 1 | 0 |
| 2018 | JAX | 0 | 0 | Did not play due to injury | | | | | | | | | | | |
| 2019 | JAX | 6 | 1 | 3 | 18 | 6.0 | 8 | 0 | 1 | 1 | 1.0 | 1 | 0 | 0 | 0 |
| 2020 | NE | 0 | 0 | Did not play due to Covid-19 opt-out | | | | | | | | | | | |
| Total | | 59 | 30 | 174 | 2,184 | 12.6 | 51 | 8 | 16 | 100 | 6.3 | 17 | 0 | 2 | 1 |

== See also ==
- List of NCAA major college football yearly receiving leaders
