= Allen Hurns =

American football player (born 1991)

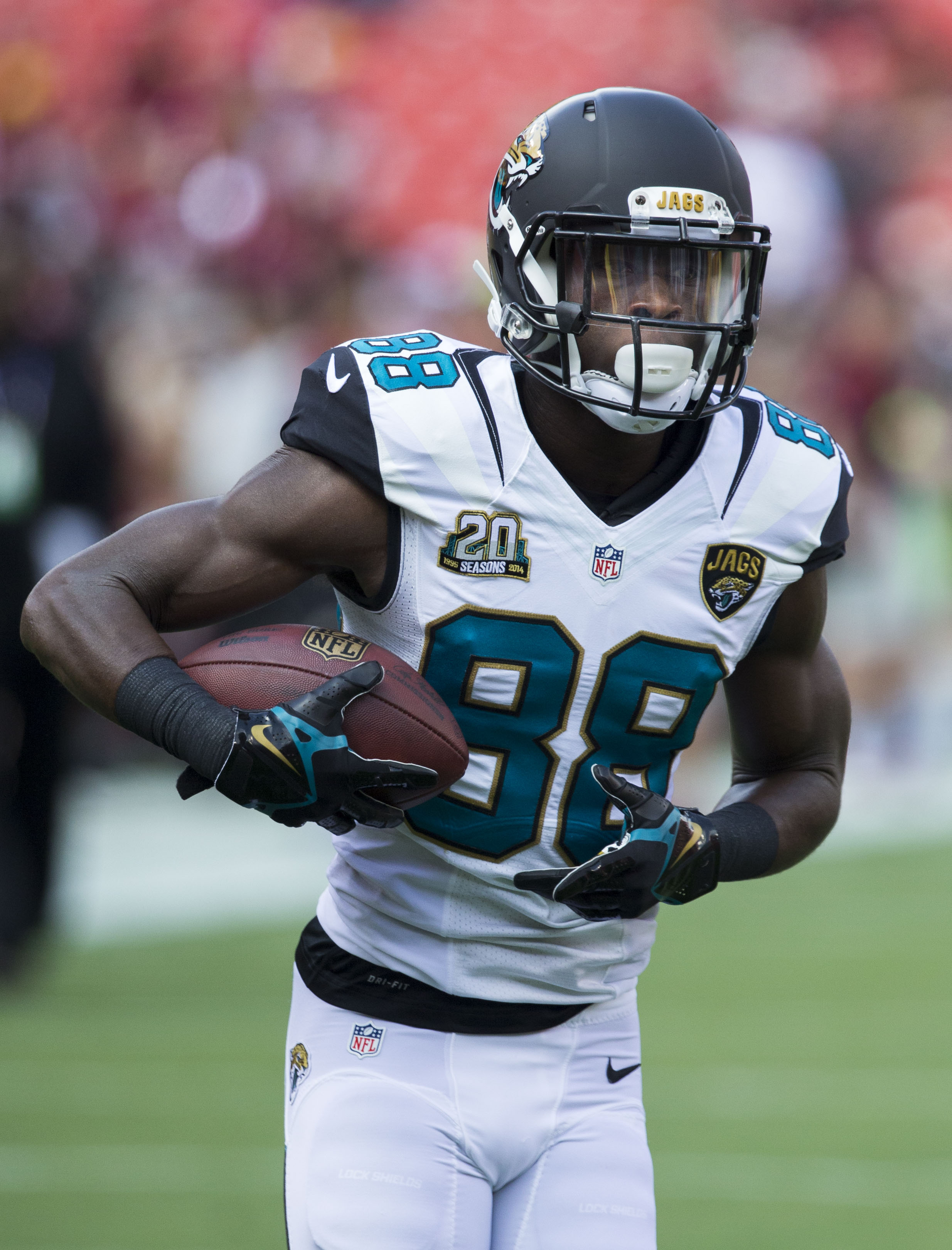
- Hurns with the Jacksonville Jaguars in 2014

No. 88, 17
- Position: Wide receiver

Personal information
- Born: November 12, 1991 (age 35); Miami, Florida, U.S.
- Listed height: 6 ft 3 in (1.91 m)
- Listed weight: 195 lb (88 kg)

Career information
- High school: Miami Carol City (Miami Gardens, Florida)
- College: Miami (FL) (2010–2013)
- NFL draft: 2014: undrafted

Career history
- Jacksonville Jaguars (2014–2017); Dallas Cowboys (2018); Miami Dolphins (2019–2021)

Awards and highlights
- Second-team All-ACC (2013)

Career NFL statistics
- Receptions: 241
- Receiving yards: 3,380
- Receiving touchdowns: 25
- Stats at Pro Football Reference

Allen Bernard Hurns (born November 12, 1991) is an American former professional football player who was a wide receiver in the National Football League (NFL). He played college football for the Miami Hurricanes and was signed by the Jacksonville Jaguars as an undrafted free agent in 2014. Hurns also played for the Dallas Cowboys and Miami Dolphins.

== Early life ==
Hurns attended Miami Carol City Senior High School in Miami, Florida. He played high school football as a wide receiver and ran track. As a junior, Hurns had 23 receptions for 450 yards and seven touchdowns. As a senior, he recorded six receptions for 110 yards before suffering a season-ending injury.

In track, Hurns ran a career-best time of 11.69 seconds in the 100 meters at the 2006 Broward County Championships, where he placed fourth. Hurns placed third in the 400 meters at the 2008 Hallandale Invitational, setting a personal-best time of 50.30 seconds. At the 2008 FHSAA 4A Region 4 Meet, he recorded a career-best time of 22.11 seconds in the 200 meters, placing seventh in the prelims.

Regarded as a three-star recruit by Rivals.com, Hurns was ranked as one of top 100 wide receivers in the nation by Scout.com.

== College career ==
Hurns accepted a football scholarship from the University of Miami. As a true freshman, he appeared in nine games focusing on special teams, while registering four tackles.

As a sophomore, Hurns started seven out of 12 games, tallying 31 receptions (third on the team) for 415 yards (third on the team) and four touchdowns.

As a junior, Hurns missed spring practice while recovering from surgery to fix a torn labrum. He started eight out of 11 games, making 28 receptions (fourth on the team) for 314 yards (sixth on the team) and four touchdowns. He did not play in the third game against Bethune-Cookman University due to a concussion. Hurns suffered a broken left thumb in the tenth game against the University of Virginia.

As a senior, Hurns started 11 of 13 games and led the team with 62 receptions for a school single-season record 1,162 yards and six touchdowns. He earned the Jack Harding Award as the Hurricanes Most Valuable Player.

During his collegiate career, Hurns had 121 receptions for 1,891 yards and 14 touchdowns in 46 games and 26 starts.

== Professional career ==
Pre-draft measurables
Height	Weight	Arm length	Hand span	40-yard dash	10-yard split	20-yard split	20-yard shuttle	Three-cone drill	Vertical jump	Broad jump	Bench press
6 ft 1 1/4 in (1.86 m)	198 lb (90 kg)	32 in (0.81 m)	9 1/4 in (0.23 m)	4.55 s	1.58 s	2.59 s	4.50 s	7.23 s	31 in (0.79 m)	10 ft 0 in (3.05 m)	14 reps
All values from NFL Combine

=== Jacksonville Jaguars ===
==== 2014 season ====
On May 11, 2014, the Jacksonville Jaguars signed Hurns as an undrafted free agent to a three-year, $1.54 million contract with a signing bonus of $5,000.

On September 7, Hurns became the first rookie wide receiver in franchise history to start in a season opener. Playing against the Philadelphia Eagles, Hurns caught four passes for 110 yards and two touchdowns from quarterback Chad Henne. His first two receptions in the first quarter both went for touchdowns, making Hurns only the second wide receiver in NFL history to record touchdowns on his first two catches (Charles Rogers of the Detroit Lions was the other in 2003), and the first rookie to ever score two receiving touchdowns in the first quarter of his first game.

Hurns finished his rookie year with 51 receptions for 677 yards and six touchdowns in 16 games and eight starts.

==== 2015 season ====
On November 29, 2015, Hurns was hospitalized after suffering an injury during Week 11 against the San Diego Chargers by hitting his head after attempting a diving catch. He was released from the hospital later that day. Hurns did not practice on December 3 and remained in concussion protocol. The next day, the Jaguars announced that Hurns would not play in Week 13 against the Tennessee Titans.

Hurns finished his second professional season with 64 receptions for 1,031 yards and 10 touchdowns in 15 games and starts, all career highs. As of 2015, Hurns holds the record for the most touchdowns in a player's first two seasons for an undrafted free agent in NFL history with 16, and was the only wide receiver to score a touchdown in seven straight games, all while playing with a sports hernia. He was ranked 89th by his fellow players on the NFL Top 100 Players of 2016.

==== 2016 season ====
On June 2, 2016, Hurns signed a four-year, $40 million contract extension with $16 million guaranteed.

Hurns regressed in the 2016 season from his successful season the previous year. Hurns started and appeared in every game up until Week 13. During a Week 4 30–27 victory over the Indianapolis Colts, he had two receptions for 47 yards and his first touchdown of the season. During a Week 8 36–22 road loss to the Titans on Thursday Night Football, Hurns caught seven passes for a season-high 98 yards and a touchdown. During a Week 12 28–21 road loss to the Buffalo Bills, he recorded his third touchdown of the season. However, Hurns suffered a hamstring injury in that game, causing him to miss the final five games of the season.

Hurns finished the 2016 season with 35 receptions for 477 yards and three touchdowns in 11 games and starts.

==== 2017 season ====
During the season-opening 29–7 road victory over the Houston Texans, Hurns' teammate Allen Robinson was lost for the season due to a torn ACL. As a result, Hurns had to step up in the offense. In the next game against the Titans, he recorded six receptions for 82 yards and his first touchdown of the season during the 37–16 loss. The following week against the Baltimore Ravens, he caught three passes for 20 yards and a touchdown in the 44–7 victory. The last time a Jaguar caught a touchdown in consecutive games was Marqise Lee in November 2016.

During a Week 7 27–0 shutout victory over the Colts, Hurns caught five passes for 101 yards, topping 100 yards for the first time since December 2015. Three weeks later on his 26th birthday, Hurns had a season-high seven receptions for 70 yards but left the eventual 20–17 overtime victory over the Los Angeles Chargers with an ankle injury. He missed the next six games as a result.

Hurns finished the 2017 season with 39 receptions for 484 yards and a career-low two touchdowns in 10 games and eight starts. The Jaguars finished atop the AFC South with a 10–6 record and made the playoffs for the first time since 2007. Hurns recorded no statistics in the Wild Card Round victory against the Bills and had a 12-yard reception in the Divisional Round road victory over the Pittsburgh Steelers. During the AFC Championship Game against the New England Patriots, he caught six passes for 80 yards in the 24–20 road loss. Hurns' 80 yards were the most receiving yards by a Jaguar in the playoffs since Matt Jones in 2006.

On March 20, 2018, Hurns was released by the Jaguars.

=== Dallas Cowboys ===
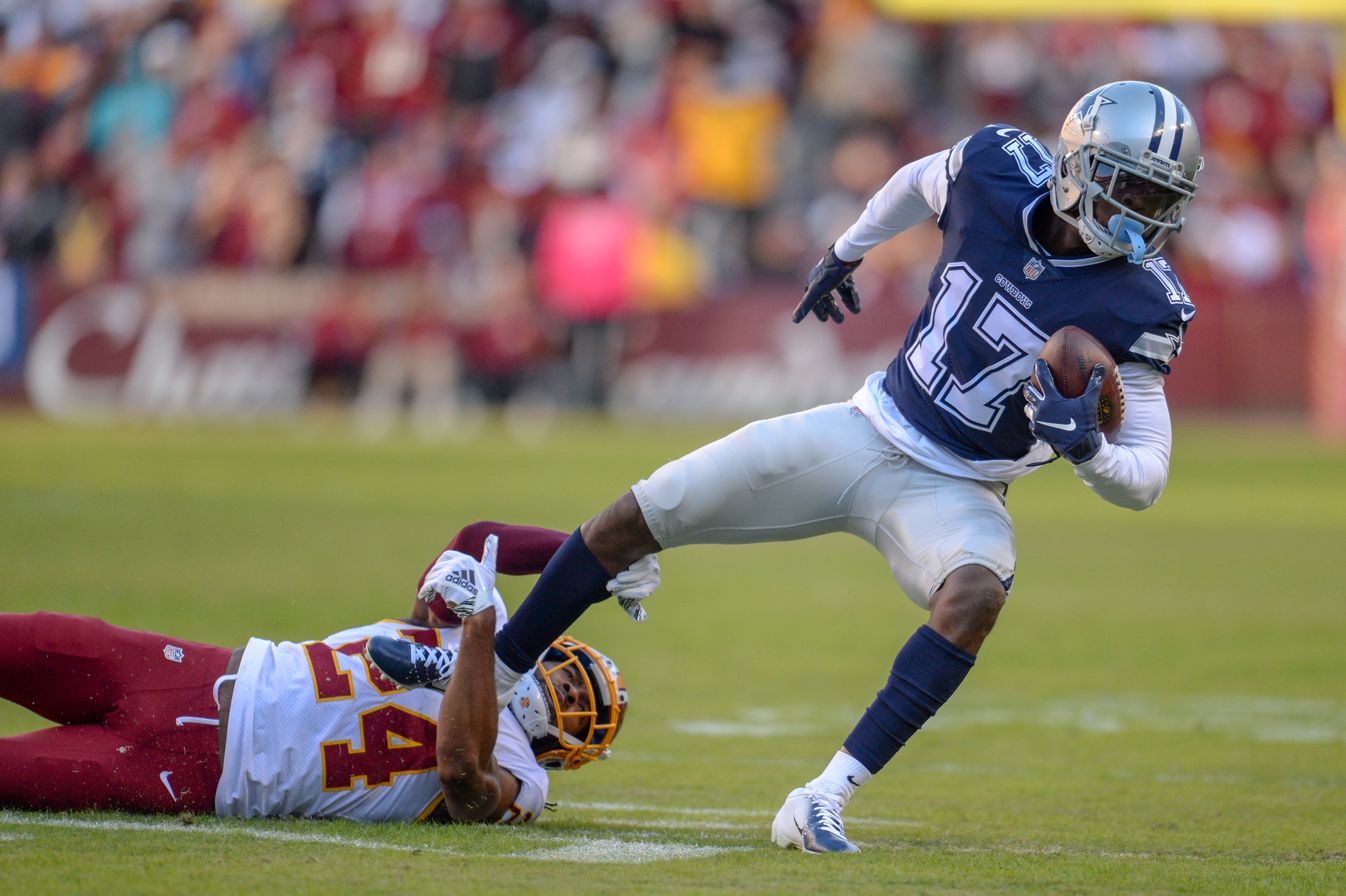
Hurns (#17) in 2018

On March 23, 2018, Hurns signed a two-year contract with the Dallas Cowboys worth up to $12 million. He changed his jersey number to 17 to honor the Parkland Shooting victims.

During the season, Hurns was expected to be the main starter as part of a wide-receiver-by-committee approach. He was a backup behind Terrance Williams in the season-opening 16–8 road loss to the Carolina Panthers, recording a 20-yard reception. Hurns was named the starter over Williams in the next game against the New York Giants, where he caught a nine-yard pass during the 20–13 victory. Three weeks later against the Houston Texans onSunday Night Football, Hurns scored his first touchdown of the season on a three-yard pass from Dak Prescott in the 19–16 overtime road loss.

Hurns' production and effectiveness decreased as he was used very sparingly in the latter half of the season, losing his starting position after the Cowboys traded a 2019 first-round draft choice to the Oakland Raiders in exchange for Amari Cooper on October 22 to take over the top receiver role and also gave more playing time to rookie Michael Gallup. During a Week 9 28–14 loss to the Tennessee Titans, Hurns had a 23-yard touchdown reception near the end of the first half. In the regular-season finale against the Giants, he recorded a 49-yard reception during the narrow 36–35 road victory.

Hurns finished the regular season setting career-lows in receptions with 20 and receiving yards with 295 while tying a career-low in receiving touchdowns with two in 16 games and seven starts. The Cowboys finished atop the NFC East with a 10–6 record and qualified for the playoffs as the #4-seed. Hurns started in his first playoff game during the Wild Card Round of the playoffs against the Seattle Seahawks, but left the narrow 24–22 victory in the first quarter after suffering an ankle injury from a tackle by safety Bradley McDougald while making a 14-yard reception. Hurns' left foot was turned 90 degrees outward as he laid on the ground and had to be popped back into place by doctors. It was later revealed that Hurns suffered a dislocated ankle and a broken fibula, forcing him to miss the rest of the playoffs. Hurns was placed on injured reserve on January 8, 2019.

On July 23, 2019, Hurns was released by the Cowboys due to salary cap reasons after the team asked him to reduce his salary and he declined.

=== Miami Dolphins ===
==== 2019 season ====
On July 26, 2019, Hurns signed a one-year deal with the Miami Dolphins, his hometown team.

During a Week 8 27–14 road loss to the Pittsburgh Steelers, Hurns caught his first touchdown of the season on a 12-yard reception from Ryan Fitzpatrick. In Week 9, Hurns became the team's #2-receiver after rookie Preston Williams suffered a torn ACL.

On November 16, 2019, Hurns signed a two-year extension with the Dolphins worth $8 million with $3.27 million guaranteed. He finished his first season with the Dolphins with 32 receptions for 416 yards and two touchdowns in 14 games and seven starts.

==== 2020 season ====
On August 4, 2020, Hurns announced that he would opt-out of the 2020 season due to the COVID-19 pandemic.

==== 2021 season ====
On August 17, 2021, Hurns was placed on season-ending injured reserve with a wrist injury.

On March 24, 2022, Hurns was released with a failed physical designation.

== Career statistics ==
=== NFL ===
==== Regular season ====
Year	Team	Games		Receiving					Rushing					Fumbles	
Year	Team	GP	GS	Rec	Yds	Avg	Lng	TD	Att	Yds	Avg	Lng	TD	Fum	Lost
2014	JAX	16	8	51	677	13.3	63T	6	—	—	—	—	—	0	0
2015	JAX	15	15	64	1,031	16.1	80T	10	—	—	—	—	—	2	1
2016	JAX	11	11	35	477	13.6	42T	3	—	—	—	—	—	1	0
2017	JAX	10	8	39	484	12.4	50	2	—	—	—	—	—	0	0
2018	DAL	16	7	20	295	14.8	49	2	—	—	—	—	—	1	0
2019	MIA	14	7	32	416	13.0	27	2	—	—	—	—	—	1	1
2020	MIA	0	0	Did not play due to COVID-19 opt out											
2021	MIA	0	0	Did not play due to injury											
Career		82	56	241	3,380	14.0	80T	25	0	0	0.0	0	0	5	2

==== Postseason ====
Year	Team	Games		Receiving					Rushing					Fumbles	
Year	Team	GP	GS	Rec	Yds	Avg	Lng	TD	Att	Yds	Avg	Lng	TD	Fum	Lost
2017	JAX	3	0	7	92	13.1	27	0	—	—	—	—	—	0	0
2018	DAL	1	1	1	14	14.0	14	0	—	—	—	—	—	0	0
Career		4	1	8	106	13.3	27	0	0	0	0.0	0	0	0	0

=== College ===
Season	Team	GP	Receiving			
Season	Team	GP	Rec	Yds	Avg	TD
2010	Miami (FL)	10	0	0	0.0	0
2011	Miami (FL)	12	31	415	13.4	4
2012	Miami (FL)	11	28	314	11.2	4
2013	Miami (FL)	13	62	1,162	18.7	6
Career		46	121	1,891	15.6	14
