= Blake Bortles =

American football player (born 1992)

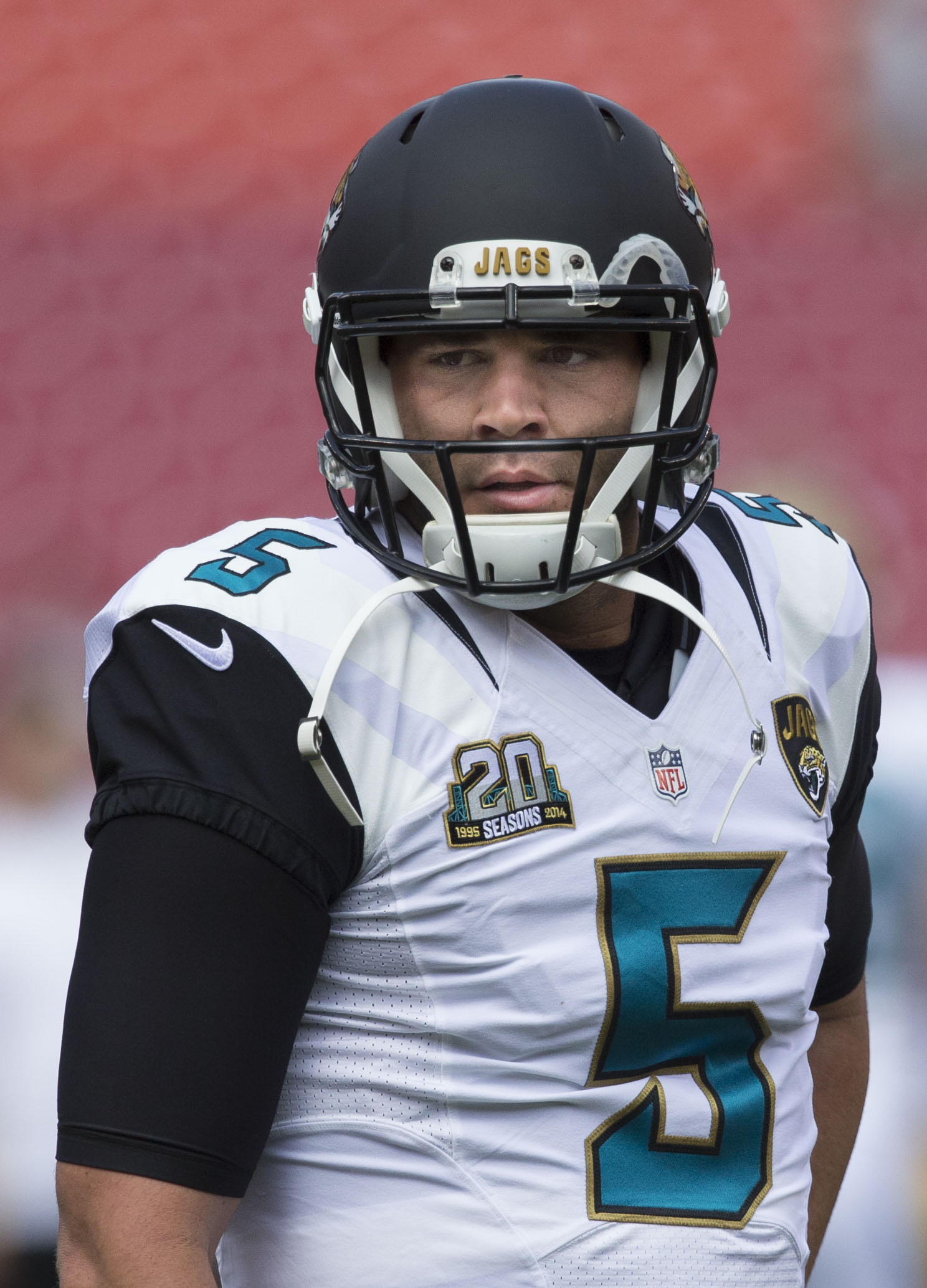
- Bortles with the Jacksonville Jaguars in 2014

No. 5, 19, 9, 6
- Position: Quarterback

Personal information
- Born: April 28, 1992 (age 34); Altamonte Springs, Florida, U.S.
- Listed height: 6 ft 5 in (1.96 m)
- Listed weight: 236 lb (107 kg)

Career information
- High school: Oviedo (Oviedo, Florida)
- College: UCF (2010–2013)
- NFL draft: 2014: 1st round, 3rd overall pick

Career history
- Jacksonville Jaguars (2014–2018); Los Angeles Rams (2019); Denver Broncos (2020); Los Angeles Rams (2020); Green Bay Packers (2021); New Orleans Saints (2021)

Awards and highlights
- AAC Offensive Player of the Year (2013); First-team All-AAC (2013); Second-team All-C-USA (2012)

Career NFL statistics
- Passing attempts: 2,634
- Passing completions: 1,562
- Completion percentage: 59.3%
- TD–INT: 103–75
- Passing yards: 17,649
- Passer rating: 80.6
- Rushing yards: 1,766
- Rushing touchdowns: 8
- Stats at Pro Football Reference

Robby Blake Bortles (born April 28, 1992) is an American former professional football quarterback who played in the National Football League (NFL) for eight seasons, primarily with the Jacksonville Jaguars. He played college football for the UCF Knights, winning AAC Offensive Player of the Year in 2013. Bortles was selected by the Jaguars third overall in the 2014 NFL draft.

As the Jaguars' starting quarterback from 2014 to 2018, Bortles set franchise records for single-season passing yards and touchdowns in 2015. His most successful season was in 2017 when he helped bring the Jaguars to their first division title and AFC Championship Game appearance since 1999. However, Bortles also led the league in interceptions in 2015 and had a league-high 75 interceptions by the end of his five years with Jacksonville. After being released by the Jaguars in 2018, he spent his final three seasons as a backup for the Los Angeles Rams, Denver Broncos, Green Bay Packers, and New Orleans Saints.

== Early life ==
Robby Blake Bortles attended Oviedo High School in Oviedo, Florida, where he excelled in football and baseball for the Lions. As a senior, he completed 151 of 233 passes for 2,211 yards with 27 touchdowns and seven interceptions. He finished his high school career with a Seminole County record 5,576 career passing yards and 53 touchdowns.

Labeled a three-star recruit by Rivals.com, Bortles was listed as the No. 44 pro-style quarterback in his class. Bortles chose UCF over offers from Colorado State, Purdue, Tulane, and Western Kentucky.

== College career ==
Bortles accepted the offer from UCF, which was the first college to offer him a scholarship and was located near his home. He was redshirted as a true freshman in 2010. As a redshirt freshman in 2011, he played in 10 games, completing 75 of 110 passes for 958 yards with six touchdowns and three interceptions. As a sophomore in 2012, he started all 14 games at quarterback. He completed 251 of 399 passes for 3,059 yards with 25 touchdowns and seven interceptions. He also rushed for 285 yards and scored eight touchdowns. He was the MVP of the 2012 Beef 'O' Brady's Bowl after completing 22 of 32 passes for 271 yards with three touchdowns and 79 rushing yards against the Ball State Cardinals.

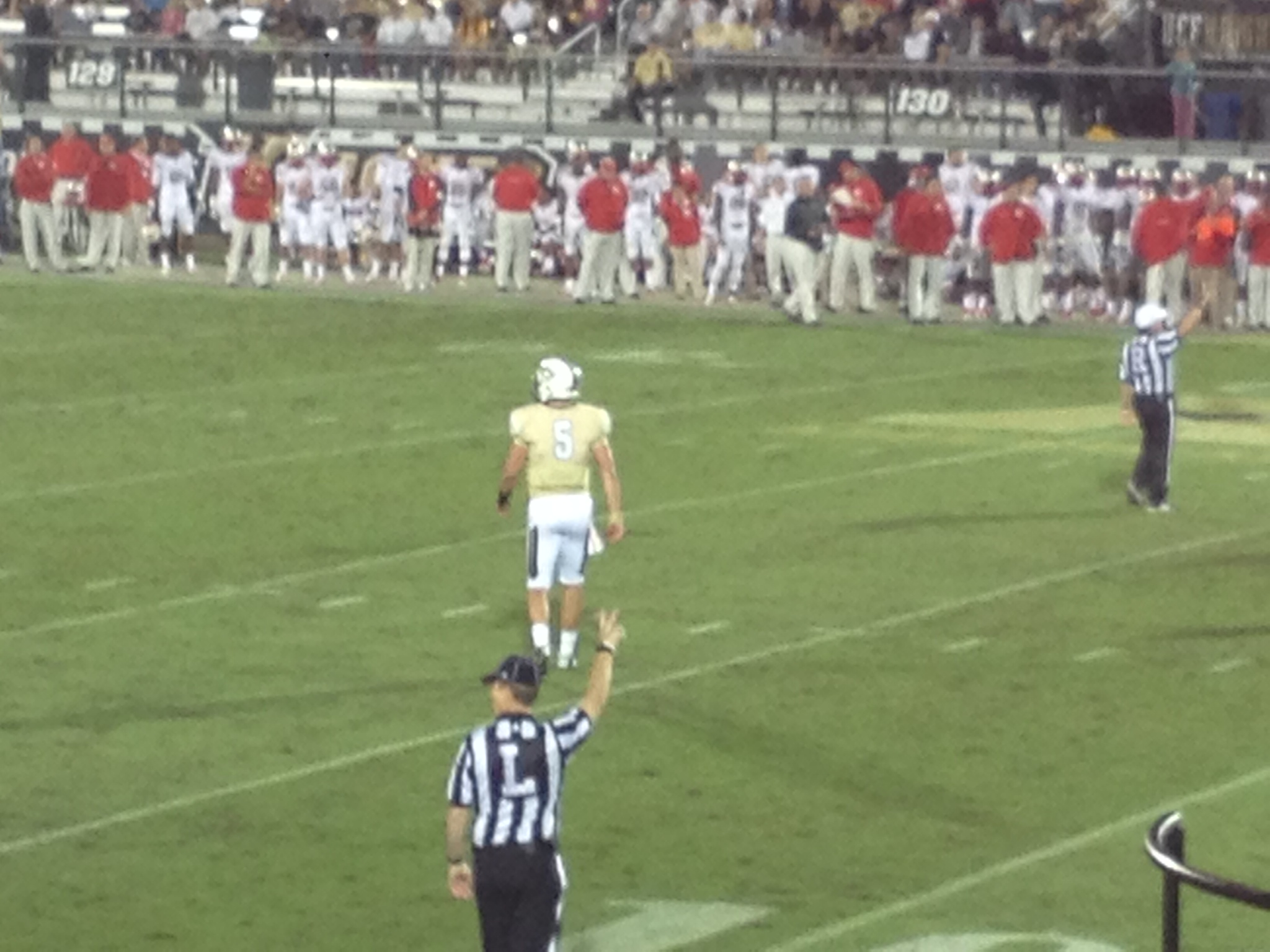
Bortles with UCF in 2013

In 2013, Bortles led the Knights to the inaugural championship of the American Athletic Conference, earning the league's automatic berth to a BCS bowl, the Tostitos Fiesta Bowl. Passing for 301 yards and rushing for 93 yards and four touchdowns, Bortles led UCF to an upset of fifth-ranked Baylor, 52–42. Bortles was named the Offensive MVP of the game, which was UCF's first major bowl win in school history. In his final collegiate season, he was 259-of-382 for 3,581 yards, 25 touchdowns, and nine interceptions. He added 87 rushes for 272 yards and six rushing touchdowns.

As a starter from the 2012 and 2013 seasons, Bortles had a 22–5 (.815) record for the Knights. As of 2016, his career passer rating of 153.9 is the highest for any UCF quarterback with at least 500 pass attempts and he was fourth in career completions, yards, and touchdowns behind Daunte Culpepper, Ryan Schneider, and Darin Hinshaw.

== Professional career ==
=== Pre-draft ===
On January 5, 2014, Bortles announced that he would forgo his senior season and enter the 2014 NFL draft.

Pre-draft measurables
Height	Weight	Arm length	Hand span	Wingspan	40-yard dash	10-yard split	20-yard split	20-yard shuttle	Three-cone drill	Vertical jump	Broad jump	Wonderlic
6 ft 5 in (1.96 m)	232 lb (105 kg)	32 7/8 in (0.84 m)	9 3/8 in (0.24 m)	6 ft 6 in (1.98 m)	4.93 s	1.75 s	2.86 s	4.21 s	7.08 s	32.5 in (0.83 m)	9 ft 7 in (2.92 m)	28
All values from NFL Combine

=== Jacksonville Jaguars ===
==== 2014 season ====
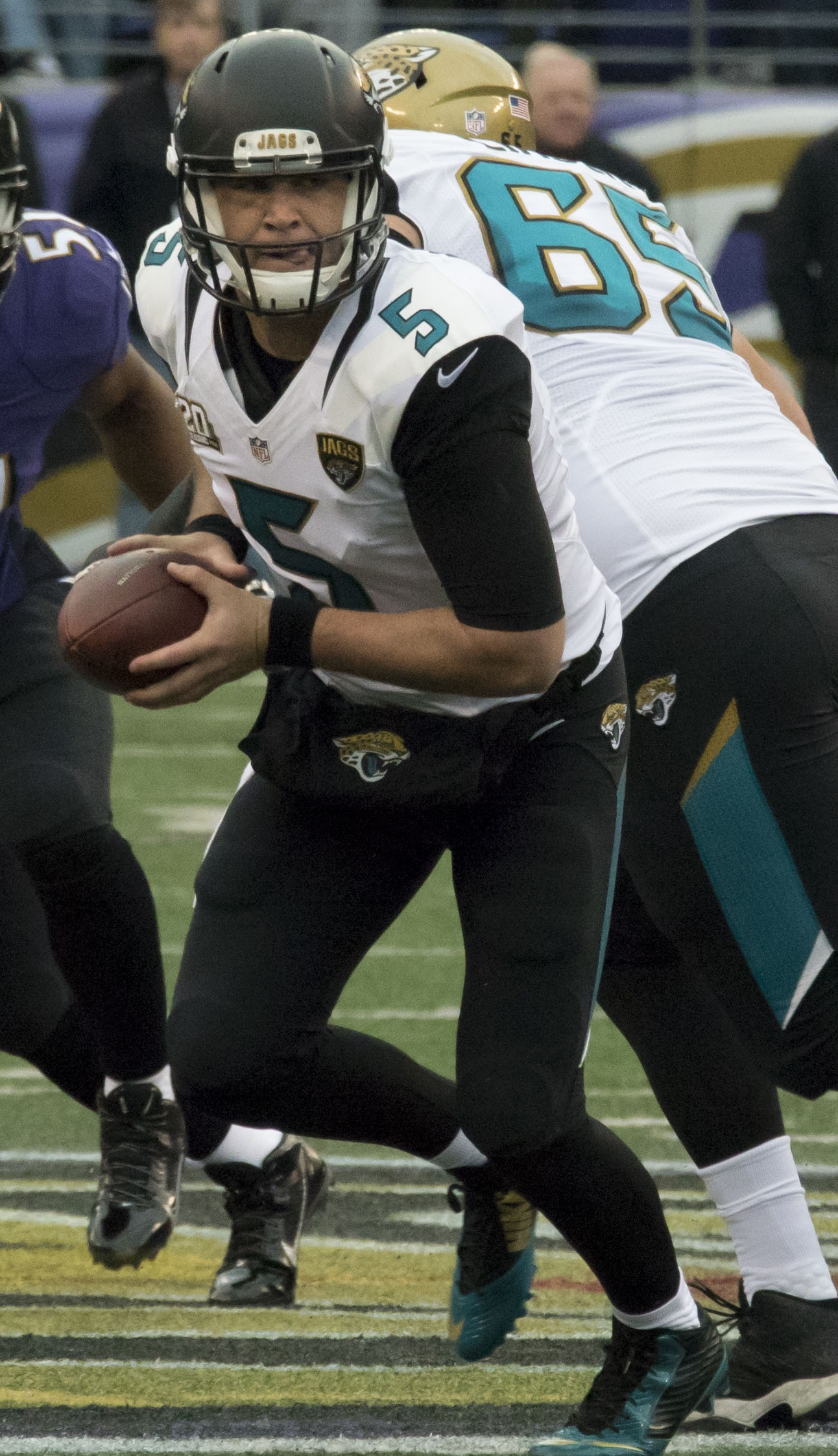
Bortles with the Jaguars in 2014

On May 8, 2014, at the 2014 NFL draft, Bortles was chosen in the first round with the third overall pick by the Jacksonville Jaguars. Bortles was the first of an eventual 14 quarterbacks to be drafted.

On June 18, 2014, Bortles signed his rookie contract worth $20.6 million guaranteed for four years with the team.

During Week 3, Bortles made his NFL debut when he came in relief of Chad Henne in the second half of a 44–17 blowout loss to the Indianapolis Colts. He went on to complete 14-of-24 passes for 223 yards, two touchdowns, and two interceptions. Following the game, head coach Gus Bradley named Bortles the starter going forward. In the next game, Bortles made his first NFL start against the San Diego Chargers. He ended the game 29-of-37 for 253 yards, one touchdown, and two interceptions in a 33–14 road loss. His 78.4 percent completion percentage set a record for a rookie quarterback's first start. Two weeks later against the Tennessee Titans, he produced 336 yards on 32-of-46 passes (three franchise rookie records), but the Jaguars lost 14–16 due to a blocked field goal. During Week 13 against the New York Giants, Bortles threw for 194 yards, with one touchdown and no interceptions and 68 rushing yards. They narrowly won 25–24 after trailing by 21 points. The 21-point comeback marked the largest in franchise history at the time. Three weeks later, he led the Jaguars to a Thursday Night Football 21–13 victory over the Titans. He completed 13 of 26 passes for a touchdown and no interceptions along with 50 rushing yards.

Bortles established himself as a dual-threat quarterback in his rookie season by rushing for 20 or more yards seven times in 2014, second only to Russell Wilson of the Seattle Seahawks. However, he also led the NFL and set franchise records in taking 55 sacks for 345 yards lost, and compiled a 3–10 record as a starter.

==== 2015 season ====
Bortles, after having a strong preseason in his second year, started the 2015 season slow with a touchdown and two interceptions in the season-opening 20–9 loss to the Carolina Panthers. In the next game, he led the Jaguars on a comeback drive against the Miami Dolphins to seal their first victory of the season. Bortles threw for 273 yards and two touchdowns with no interceptions. During Week 5 against the Tampa Bay Buccaneers, Bortles threw for a then-career-high four touchdowns for 303 yards along with 21 rushing yards. However, this was not enough as the Jaguars lost 38–31. During Week 13, he broke the Jaguars single game record with five touchdown passes in a 42–39 road loss to the Titans.

The Jaguars finished with a 5–11 record in 2015, and Bortles again led the league in sacks taken (51) and interceptions thrown (18). However, the season was also a success for the second-year quarterback in many ways. Bortles set the Jaguars single-season franchise records for passing touchdowns (35), passing yards, (4,428), pass completions (355), and pass attempts (606). His 90-yard touchdown throw to Allen Robinson in Week 16 was the longest in the NFL that year. His passer rating was above 80 in eleven games, and he threw a touchdown pass in the Jaguars' first 15 games of 2015, a franchise record. After throwing no touchdowns in the regular season finale, he shared second place with Eli Manning, Cam Newton, and Carson Palmer, behind only Tom Brady's 36. He was also seventh in the NFL in passing yards with 4,428, behind Drew Brees, Philip Rivers, Brady, Palmer, Matt Ryan, and Manning. He was ranked 56th by his fellow players on the NFL Top 100 Players of 2016.

==== 2016 season ====
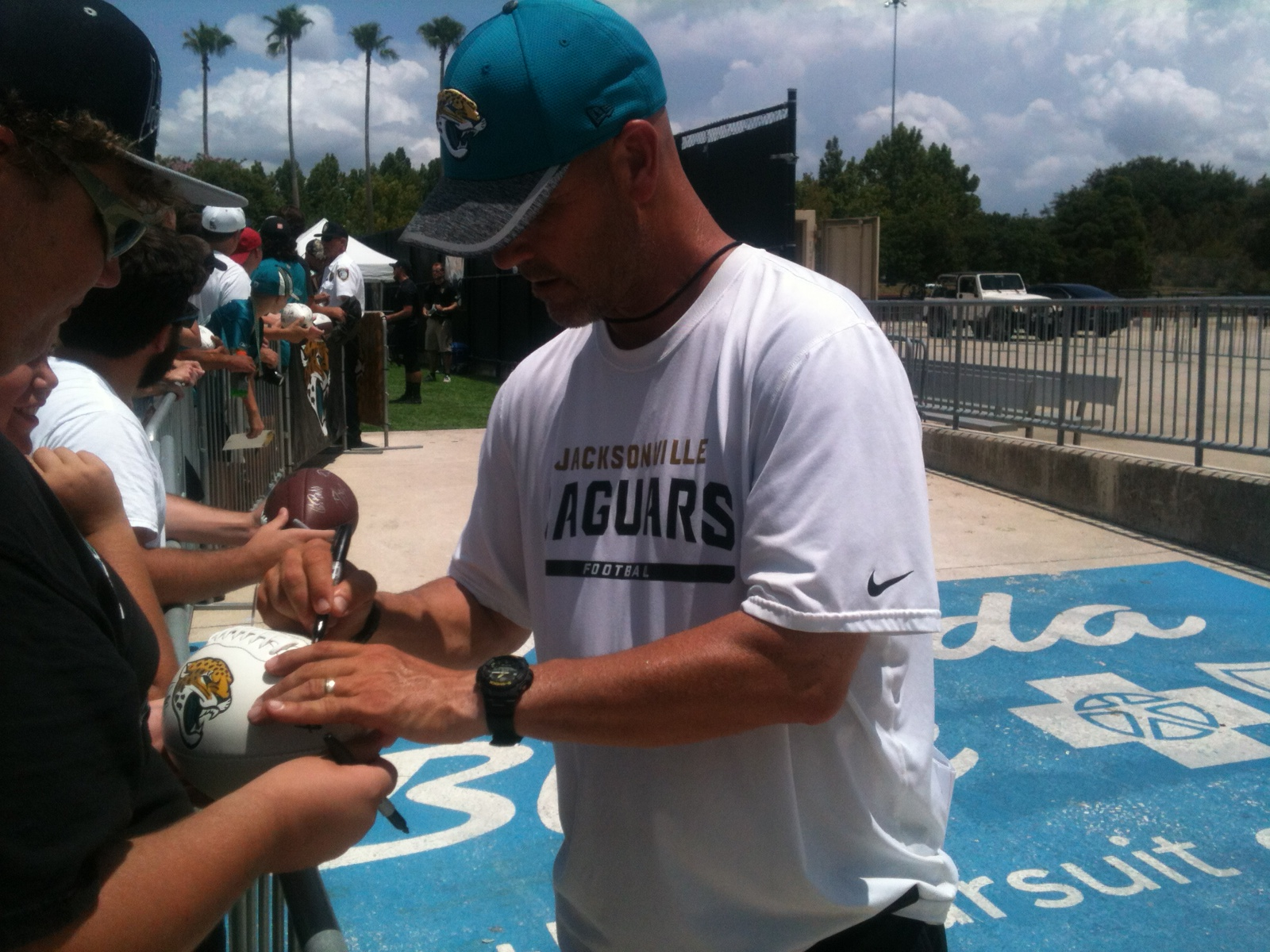
Bortles signing an autograph in 2016

Bortles compiled a disappointing 3–13 record for the 2016 Jaguars, amid considerable turnover in the organization. During a nine-game losing streak, offensive coordinator Greg Olson was replaced by Nathaniel Hackett in Week 8, and head coach Gus Bradley by Doug Marrone in Week 16. The following week, Bortles caught his first career reception from wide receiver Marqise Lee on a 20-yard trick play that netted a touchdown and led to a Christmas Eve 38–17 victory over the Titans. It was his only game with a passer rating of over 100 in 2016 (compared to five in 2015).

Bortles finished the 2016 season with 3,905 yards passing and a 58.9 completion percentage, 23 touchdown passes, 16 interceptions (4th in the NFL), but just 34 sacks, and five 300+ yard games (7th in the NFL). Following the season, he stated that he had suffered from a Grade 1 right AC joint sprain in Week 8, and suffered from wrist tendinitis in the latter part of the season, which could explain his regression.

==== 2017 season ====
On May 1, 2017, the Jaguars picked up the fifth-year option on Bortles's contract.

On August 26, he was named the starting quarterback to begin the regular season after a competition with Chad Henne. Through the first 11 games of the season, Bortles was relatively inconsistent. He had an excellent Week 3 with four passing touchdowns and no interceptions for a 128.2 rating in a 44–7 victory over the Baltimore Ravens in London. He broke 300 yards passing just once in Week 7 with 330 passing yards, one passing touchdown and no interceptions for a 124.7 rating against the Colts. Excluding these games, Bortles averaged 185.6 yards per game, no games of either 300+ yards or 100+ rating, and had seven touchdowns and eight interceptions in those nine games. Through 12 weeks, out of the 20 eleven-game starters, Bortles was 17th in yardage and touchdowns, and 18th in rating. However, he had a 100+ rating in the next three consecutive games, compiling 8 touchdowns and 0 interceptions, and 300+ yards in three of the next four games.

During Week 15 against the Houston Texans, Bortles finished with 326 passing yards and three passing touchdowns as the Jaguars won, 45–7, helping the team clinch their first playoff berth in 10 years. In the next game against the San Francisco 49ers, Bortles finished with a season-best 382 passing yards, two passing touchdowns, and three interceptions as the Jaguars lost on the road by a score of 44–33. Despite the loss, the Jaguars clinched the AFC South due to the Titans losing to the Los Angeles Rams. Bortles finished the regular season with 3,687 passing yards, 21 touchdowns to 13 interceptions, and an 84.7 quarterback rating (21st of 35 players with at least 200 attempts).

After finishing 10–6, the Jaguars made the playoffs as the No. 3 seed in the 2017 AFC Playoffs. In the Wild Card Round, the Jaguars defeated the Buffalo Bills by a score of 10–3 in Bortles's first playoff game. He completed 12 of 23 passes for 87 yards and a touchdown. He also had a game-high 88 yards rushing on 10 carries. He joined Michael Vick (2004) as the only quarterbacks with more rushing than passing yards in a postseason game since the 1970 merger, and the 75 net passing yards was the lowest by a winning postseason quarterback since Joe Flacco in the 2009 postseason. Due to his poor passing performance against the Bills, Bortles received heavy criticism from analysts and even other players in the league. When confronted about these criticisms, Bortles stated that he "couldn't care less" and even said, "There's people who think LeBron James sucks, so if that happens, I'm sure there will always be people who always think I suck." However, Bortles bounced back in the Divisional Round, leading the Jaguars to beat the heavily favored Pittsburgh Steelers on the road by a score of 45–42. Bortles completed 14 of 26 passes for 214 yards and a touchdown to stifle a Steelers comeback. This would be Jacksonville's first AFC Championship Game appearance since 1999, but they lost to the New England Patriots on the road by a score of 24–20 after spoiling a 20–10 lead in the fourth quarter. Bortles finished the game completing 23 of 36 passes for 293 yards and a touchdown. He finished the playoffs completing 57.6% of his passes for 594 yards, three touchdowns, and no interceptions. He also rushed for 121 yards.

==== 2018 season ====
On February 24, 2018, Bortles signed a three-year, $54 million contract to stay with the Jaguars through the 2020 season.

Bortles and the Jaguars had a 3–1 start to the season. Between sub-200-yard games in Week 1 and Week 3, Bortles faced the Patriots in 97-degree heat and finished with 377 passing yards, four touchdowns, and an interception in the 31–20 victory. In Week 4, he passed for 388 yards in a 31–12 win over the New York Jets. In the next game, he recorded a career-high 430 passing yards and a touchdown against the Kansas City Chiefs. However, he also threw four interceptions and took five sacks in the 30–14 road loss. The following week against the Dallas Cowboys, Bortles threw for 149 yards, a touchdown, and an interception to Jeff Heath in triple coverage in a 40–7 road loss. During Week 7 against the Texans, he lost a fumble on the opening possessions of each half. Bortles was benched for Cody Kessler after he lost the second fumble, finishing the day with a career-low 61 yards on 12 attempts. At the time, the Jaguars had the league's second-best defense but had lost three games in a row; Bortles was tied for second-worst in the league with four sub-200-yard passing games, third-worst with eight interceptions, and seventh-worst with five fumbles.

Nevertheless, head coach Doug Marrone elected to leave Bortles as the starter for the Week 8 matchup in London against the Philadelphia Eagles. He fumbled the opening snap, but played through a shoulder injury to finish with 286 yards and a touchdown. He led the Jaguars on three straight scoring drives late in the game to draw within six points before completing just two of his last nine passes in the 18–24 loss. After a Week 9 bye, the Jaguars went on the road to face the Colts. Bortles finished the game with 320 yards and two touchdowns. He completed 10 of 11 passes for two scoring drives to open the second half, and a drive to the 23-yard line in the waning moments of the 4th quarter before a Rashad Greene fumble allowed the Colts to kneel out the clock and preserve a 29–26 victory. In the next game, Bortles completed 10 of 18 passes for a career-fourth-worst 104 yards in a 20–16 loss to the Steelers. The following week, he completed 12 of 23 passes for 127 yards and a touchdown with two interceptions in a 21–24 road loss to the Bills.

The next day, Marrone announced that Bortles would be benched in favor of Cody Kessler for the Week 13 matchup against the Colts. He was then 30th of 34 qualified quarterbacks in completion percentage, quarterback rating, and yards-per-attempt, and second-worst only to the Oakland Raiders's Derek Carr with eight losses. In Week 16 against the Dolphins, Bortles entered the game in relief of a struggling Kessler in the late second quarter, was promptly sacked on third down, benched, then reentered the game in the late third quarter where he completed five of six passes for 39 yards and rushed four times for 26 yards to help lead the Jaguars to a 17–7 victory. Bortles started the season finale against the Texans, but was ineffective with just 107 yards and an interception on 28 attempts. On the season, in Bortles' 13 appearances for the Jaguars, he compiled a 4–9 record, and was 22nd of 25 players with at least 13 appearances in completion percentage (60.3%), yards (2,718), yards per game (209.1), touchdowns (13), and 23rd in passer rating (79.8); his 11 interceptions ranked 15th. His 357 rushing yards was sixth among quarterbacks.

Bortles was released by the Jaguars on March 13, 2019, after the team signed quarterback Nick Foles. Over his five years with the Jaguars, Bortles led the league in interceptions (75 in 75 games, a league-leading 13 of which were returned for touchdowns) and second among quarterbacks in fumbles (46) to Russell Wilson.

=== Los Angeles Rams (first stint) ===
On March 18, 2019, Bortles signed a one-year contract with the Rams to be Jared Goff's backup.

Bortles played three snaps of a Week 7 blowout of the Atlanta Falcons with a 20-point lead late in the fourth quarter. Five days prior, Bortles was reunited with his former Jaguars teammate Jalen Ramsey in a trade that sent Ramsey to the Rams in exchange for first round picks in 2020 and 2021, as well as a fourth round pick in 2021. In his second appearance, a Week 10 loss to the Steelers, Bortles appeared in only one play, a third down with two yards to go; the team did not pick up the third down conversion. Bortles' third and final appearance of the season came in a week 13 blowout victory over the Arizona Cardinals. Bortles saw action in a seven-play drive and completed his first pass of the season.

=== Denver Broncos ===
On September 24, 2020, Bortles was signed by the Denver Broncos after an injury to starter Drew Lock. Bortles was released by the Broncos on October 17, 2020, after Lock recovered from his shoulder injury. Bortles was re-signed to Denver's practice squad two days later. On November 28, 2020, Bortles was placed on the practice squad/COVID-19 list after coming in close contact with Jeff Driskel, who tested positive for the virus. Bortles and the other three quarterbacks on the Broncos roster were fined by the team for violating COVID-19 protocols. He was restored to the practice squad on December 1.

=== Los Angeles Rams (second stint) ===
On December 29, 2020, Bortles was signed by the Rams off the Broncos' practice squad following an injury to starter Jared Goff.

=== Green Bay Packers ===
On May 24, 2021, Bortles signed a one-year deal with the Green Bay Packers worth $1 million. He was released on July 27, 2021. On November 4, 2021, Bortles was re-signed to the Packers practice squad as the backup for Jordan Love after starter Aaron Rodgers was unavailable for Week 9 due to a COVID-19 diagnosis. On November 6, 2021, he was elevated to the active roster, for a game against the Chiefs. He was released on November 15.

=== New Orleans Saints ===
On December 24, 2021, Bortles was signed by the New Orleans Saints to back up rookie quarterback Ian Book after starter Jameis Winston tore his ACL in week 8. His backup Trevor Siemian and third stringer Taysom Hill both contracted COVID-19. On January 6, 2022, Bortles was placed on the Saints COVID-19 protocol list and was inactive for their Week 18 matchup against the Falcons. He signed a reserve/future contract with the Saints on January 12, 2022. On April 5, the Saints waived Bortles, who had asked to be released from his contract following the team's decision to sign Andy Dalton.

He announced his retirement on the podcast Pardon My Take on October 5, 2022.

== Career statistics ==
=== NFL ===
Legend
	Led the league
**Bold**	Career high

==== Regular season ====
Year	Team	Games			Passing								Rushing				Sacks		Fumbles	
Year	Team	GP	GS	Record	Cmp	Att	Pct	Yds	Avg	TD	Int	Rtg	Att	Yds	Avg	TD	Sck	SckY	Fum	Lost
2014	JAX	14	13	3–10	280	475	58.9	2,908	6.1	11	17	69.5	56	**419**	**7.5**	0	**55**	**345**	7	3
2015	JAX	16	16	5–11	355	606	58.6	**4,428**	**7.3**	**35**	**18**	**88.2**	52	310	6.0	2	51	320	**14**	**5**
2016	JAX	16	16	3–13	**368**	**625**	58.9	3,905	6.2	23	16	78.8	**58**	359	6.2	**3**	34	197	8	0
2017	JAX	16	16	**10–6**	315	523	60.2	3,687	7.0	21	13	84.7	57	322	5.6	2	24	123	9	3
2018	JAX	13	12	3–9	243	403	**60.3**	2,718	6.7	13	11	79.8	**58**	365	6.3	1	31	173	8	2
2019	LAR	3	0	–	1	2	50.0	3	1.5	0	0	56.2	2	−9	−4.5	0	0	0	0	0
2020	DEN	0	0	–	Did not play															
2020	LAR	0	0	–	Did not play															
2021	GB	0	0	–	Did not play															
2021	NO	0	0	–	Did not play															
Career		78	73	24–49	1,562	2,634	59.3	17,649	6.7	103	75	80.6	283	1,766	6.3	8	195	1,158	46	13

==== Postseason ====
Year	Team	Games			Passing								Rushing				Sacks		Fumbles	
Year	Team	GP	GS	Record	Cmp	Att	Pct	Yds	Avg	TD	Int	Rtg	Att	Yds	Avg	TD	Sck	SckY	Fum	Lost
2017	JAX	3	3	2–1	49	85	57.6	594	7.0	3	0	91.0	17	121	7.1	0	5	32	4	0
2020	LAR	0	0	–	Did not play															
Career		3	3	2–1	49	85	57.6	594	7.0	3	0	91.0	17	121	7.1	0	5	32	4	0

=== College ===
Season	Team	Passing									Rushing		
Season	Team	GP	GS	Cmp	Att	Pct	Yds	TD	Int	Rtg	Att	Yds	TD
2010	UCF	Redshirt											
2011	UCF	10	0	75	110	67.8	958	6	3	153.9	21	4	1
2012	UCF	14	14	251	399	62.9	3,059	25	7	144.5	87	285	8
2013	UCF	13	13	259	382	67.8	3,581	25	9	163.4	87	272	6
Total		37	27	585	891	66.2	7,598	56	19	153.9	195	561	15

== Career highlights ==
=== Awards and honors ===
- AAC Offensive Player of the Year (2013)
- First-team All-AAC (2013)
- Second-team All-C-USA (2012)
- UCF Athletics Hall of Fame (2021)
- Ranked No. 56 in the Top 100 Players of 2016

=== Jaguars franchise records ===
- Most passing touchdowns in a season – 35 (2015)
- Most passing yards in a season – 4,428 (2015)
- Most pass attempts in a season – 625 (2016)
- Most passing touchdowns in a game – 5 (Week 13, 2015, vs. Tennessee Titans)
- Most consecutive games with a passing touchdown – 15 (Week 1, 2015–Week 16, 2015)
- Most passing attempts in a game – 61 (Week 5, 2018, vs. Kansas City Chiefs)

== In popular culture ==
Bortles was the subject of a long-running gag on the NBC TV comedy The Good Place, where Jason Mendoza, a fictional former Jacksonville resident, continues his fandom of the Jaguars, and Bortles in particular, into the afterlife.

== Personal life ==
Bortles is the son of Rob and Suzy Bortles. Rob was a wrestler and football player in high school; Suzy played high school softball. Bortles' brother, Colby, was a third baseman with the Ole Miss baseball team, and was selected in the 22nd round of the 2017 MLB draft by the Detroit Tigers. Colby now coaches baseball at Charleston Southern University.
