= Andre Branch =

American football player (born 1989)

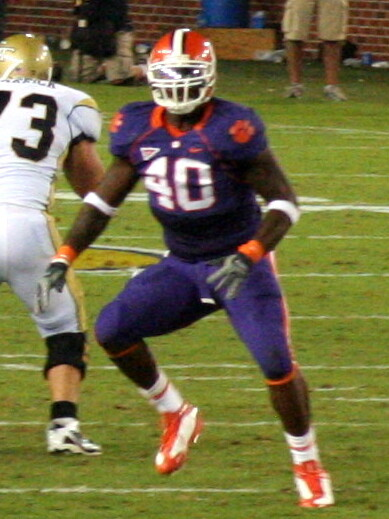
- Branch with Clemson in 2009

No. 50, 90
- Position: Linebacker

Personal information
- Born: July 14, 1989 (age 37); Richmond, Virginia, U.S.
- Listed height: 6 ft 5 in (1.96 m)
- Listed weight: 265 lb (120 kg)

Career information
- High school: Varina (Henrico, Virginia)
- College: Clemson (2007–2011)
- NFL draft: 2012: 2nd round, 38th overall pick

Career history
- Jacksonville Jaguars (2012–2015); Miami Dolphins (2016–2018); Arizona Cardinals (2019)*
- * Offseason or practice squad member only

Awards and highlights
- Second-team All-American (2011); First-team All-ACC (2011)

Career NFL statistics
- Total tackles: 188
- Sacks: 25.5
- Forced fumbles: 8
- Fumble recoveries: 4
- Defensive touchdowns: 1
- Stats at Pro Football Reference

Orlandus Andre Branch (born July 14, 1989) is an American former professional football player who was a linebacker in the National Football League (NFL). He played college football for the Clemson Tigers. He was selected by the Jacksonville Jaguars in the second round of the 2012 NFL draft with the 38th overall pick.

== College career ==
Branch attended Clemson University from 2007 to 2011. For his career he had 179 tackles and 17.5 sacks. As a senior in 2011, he was a first-team All-ACC pick after recording 77 tackles and 10.5 sacks.

== Professional career ==
Pre-draft measurables
Height	Weight	Arm length	Hand span	Wingspan	40-yard dash	10-yard split	20-yard split	20-yard shuttle	Three-cone drill	Vertical jump	Broad jump	Bench press
6 ft 4 1/4 in (1.94 m)	259 lb (117 kg)	34 in (0.86 m)	9 in (0.23 m)	6 ft 9 3/4 in (2.08 m)	4.72 s	1.59 s	2.76 s	4.25 s	7.19 s	32.5 in (0.83 m)	10 ft 0 in (3.05 m)	19 reps
All values from NFL Combine/Pro Day

=== Jacksonville Jaguars ===
Branch was selected by the Jacksonville Jaguars in the second round of the 2012 NFL draft with the 38th overall pick. On May 29, 2012, he signed a 4-year, $5.1 million contract.

=== Miami Dolphins ===
Branch signed with the Miami Dolphins in on March 17, 2016. In his first year in Miami, Branch started 11 of 16 games for the Dolphins, posting a career-high 49 tackles to go along with 5.5 sacks and two forced fumbles.

On March 8, 2017, Branch signed a three-year, $24 million contract extension with the Dolphins. He started 14 games in 2017, recording 23 combined tackles and 4.5 sacks.

Following a Week 1 game in 2018, Branch was fined $10,026 for taunting Taylor Lewan after delivering a concussion to Lewan with a blind side hit.

On March 2, 2019, Branch was released by the Dolphins.

=== Arizona Cardinals ===
On July 30, 2019, Branch signed a one-year contract with the Arizona Cardinals after visiting earlier in June. He was released on August 25, 2019.

== NFL career statistics ==
Legend
**Bold**	Career high

=== Regular season ===
Year	Team	Games		Tackles					Interceptions					Fumbles			
Year	Team	GP	GS	Cmb	Solo	Ast	Sck	TFL	Int	Yds	TD	Lng	PD	FF	FR	Yds	TD
2012	JAX	13	3	12	9	3	1.0	0	0	0	0	0	1	1	**1**	0	0
2013	JAX	**16**	0	37	**30**	7	**6.0**	**10**	0	0	0	0	3	0	0	0	0
2014	JAX	9	0	18	12	6	3.0	2	0	0	0	0	3	**2**	**1**	0	0
2015	JAX	13	9	24	18	6	4.0	4	0	0	0	0	**4**	**2**	**1**	**49**	**1**
2016	MIA	**16**	11	**49**	27	**22**	5.5	8	0	0	0	0	1	**2**	0	0	0
2017	MIA	14	**14**	23	12	11	4.5	5	0	0	0	0	1	0	0	0	0
2018	MIA	14	1	25	17	8	1.5	5	0	0	0	0	1	1	**1**	0	0
		95	38	188	125	63	25.5	34	0	0	0	0	14	8	4	49	1

=== Playoffs ===
Year	Team	Games		Tackles					Interceptions					Fumbles			
Year	Team	GP	GS	Cmb	Solo	Ast	Sck	TFL	Int	Yds	TD	Lng	PD	FF	FR	Yds	TD
2016	MIA	**1**	**1**	**1**	**1**	0	0.0	0	0	0	0	0	0	0	0	0	0
		1	1	1	1	0	0.0	0	0	0	0	0	0	0	0	0	0
