= Chris Reed (American football) =

American football player (born 1992)

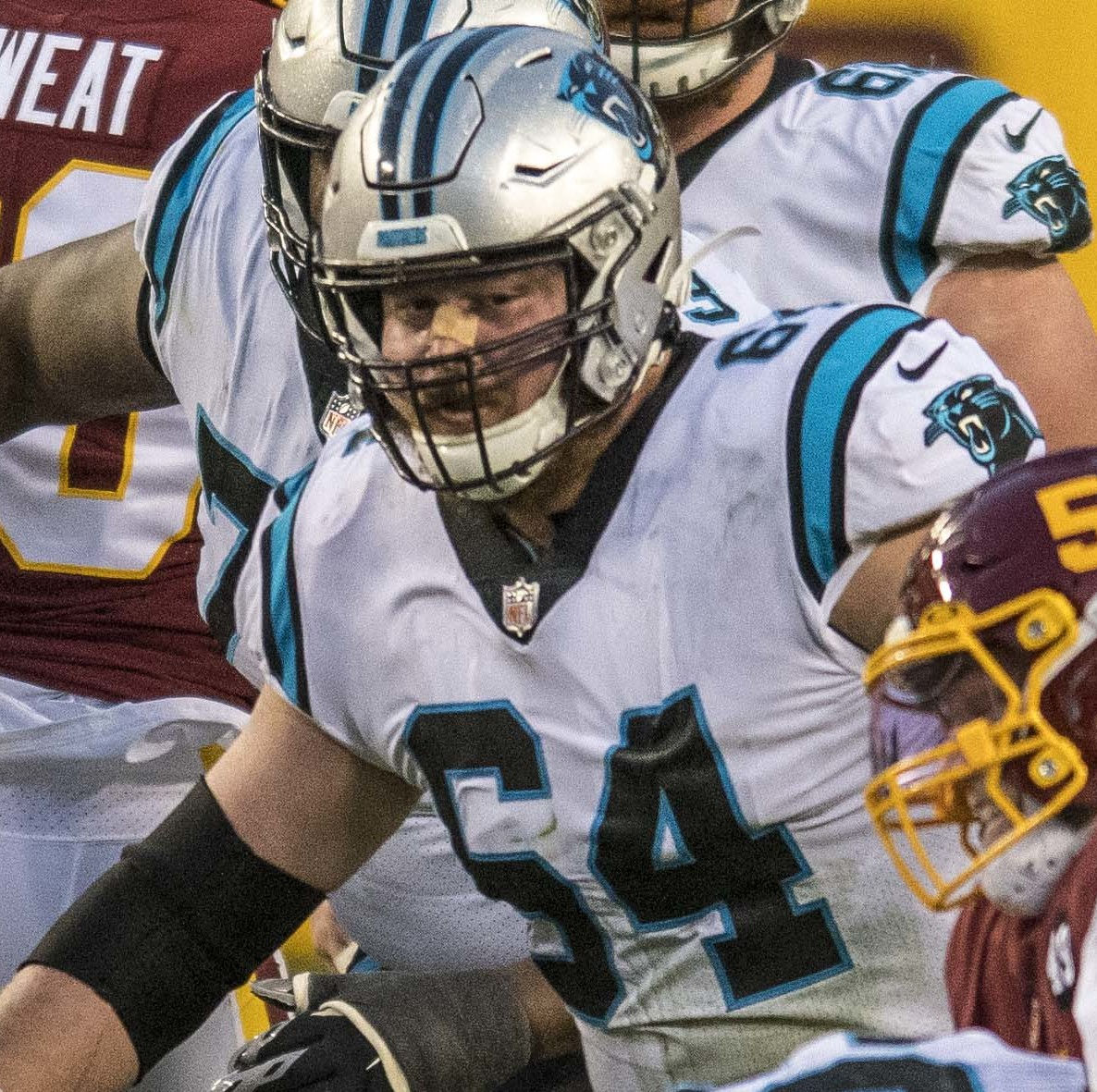
- Reed with the Carolina Panthers in 2020

No. 62, 64, 69
- Position: Guard

Personal information
- Born: July 22, 1992 (age 34); Cedar Rapids, Iowa, U.S.
- Listed height: 6 ft 3 in (1.91 m)
- Listed weight: 314 lb (142 kg)

Career information
- High school: Omaha Central (Omaha, Nebraska)
- College: Minnesota State
- NFL draft: 2015: undrafted

Career history
- Jacksonville Jaguars (2015–2018); Miami Dolphins (2019); Carolina Panthers (2019–2020); Indianapolis Colts (2021); Minnesota Vikings (2022–2023); Houston Texans (2024)*; New Orleans Saints (2024)
- * Offseason or practice squad member only

Career NFL statistics as of 2023
- Games played: 70
- Games started: 30
- Stats at Pro Football Reference

Christopher Reed (born July 22, 1992) is an American former professional football guard. He was signed as an undrafted free agent by the Jacksonville Jaguars after the 2015 NFL draft. He played college football for the Minnesota State Mavericks. He has also been a member of the Miami Dolphins, the Carolina Panthers, the Indianapolis Colts and the Minnesota Vikings.

== College career ==
Reed attended Minnesota State University where he played as a left tackle for the Minnesota State football team. In addition to playing football, Reed was also a thrower on the school's track and field team. While on the track and field team, Reed, was an 11-time NCAA Division II Track & Field All-American and the NCAA DII outdoor shot put champion in both 2013 and 2014. He also holds school records in the indoor and outdoor shot put, as well as, the indoor weight throw and outdoor hammer throw.

== Professional career ==
Pre-draft measurables
Height	Weight	Arm length	Hand span	40-yard dash	10-yard split	20-yard split	20-yard shuttle	Three-cone drill	Vertical jump	Broad jump	Bench press
6 ft 3 1/8 in (1.91 m)	305 lb (138 kg)	31 in (0.79 m)	9 in (0.23 m)	5.04 s	1.72 s	2.90 s	5.08 s	8.09 s	28.5 in (0.72 m)	9 ft 2 in (2.79 m)	25 reps
All values from Pro Day

=== Jacksonville Jaguars ===
Following the 2015 NFL draft, Reed was signed by the Jacksonville Jaguars as an undrafted free agent. He was on the team's practice squad during the 2015 season. He made the team's 53-man roster on September 3, 2016. He played in 10 games with four starts before being placed on injured reserve on December 23, 2016, with a toe injury.

On September 2, 2017, Reed was waived by the Jaguars and signed to the practice squad the next day. He was promoted to the active roster on October 7, 2017. He played in six games in 2017, starting three at left guard in place of the injured Patrick Omameh.

=== Miami Dolphins ===
On March 18, 2019, Reed signed with the Miami Dolphins. He played in five games before being waived on December 4, 2019.

=== Carolina Panthers ===
On December 5, 2019, Reed was claimed off waivers by the Carolina Panthers. He was placed on the reserve/COVID-19 list by the team on September 1, 2020. He was activated on September 23.

=== Indianapolis Colts ===
Reed signed with the Indianapolis Colts on April 1, 2021.

=== Minnesota Vikings ===
Reed signed with the Minnesota Vikings on April 1, 2022. He was placed on the reserve/non-football injury list on August 29, 2023. He was activated to the 53-man roster on November 20, 2023.

=== Houston Texans ===
On July 18, 2024, Reed signed with the Houston Texans. He was released on August 27.

=== New Orleans Saints ===
On September 25, 2024, Reed was signed to the New Orleans Saints practice squad. He was released on October 22.

== NFL career statistics ==
Year	Team	Games	Starts
2016	JAX	10	4
2017	JAX	6	3
2018	JAX	9	1
2019	MIA	5	1
2019	CAR	3	0
2020	CAR	14	14
2021	IND	14	6
2022	MIN	7	1
2023	MIN	2	0
Career		70	30
