= Bryan Walters =

American football player (born 1987)

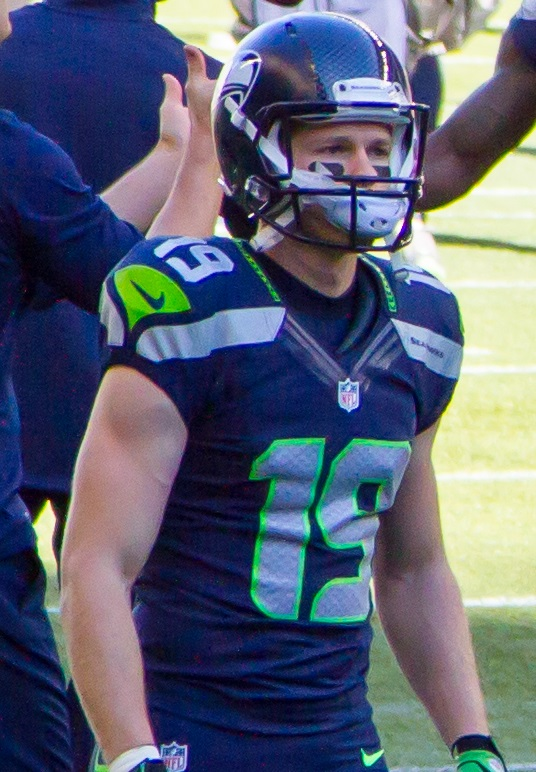
- Walters with the Seattle Seahawks in 2014

No. 13, 19, 81
- Position: Wide receiver

Personal information
- Born: November 4, 1987 (age 39); Bothell, Washington, U.S.
- Listed height: 6 ft 0 in (1.83 m)
- Listed weight: 190 lb (86 kg)

Career information
- High school: Kirkland (WA) Juanita
- College: Cornell
- NFL draft: 2010: undrafted

Career history
- San Diego Chargers (2010–2011); Minnesota Vikings (2012)*; Seattle Seahawks (2012–2014); Jacksonville Jaguars (2015–2016)
- * Offseason or practice squad member only

Awards and highlights
- Super Bowl champion (XLVIII)

Career NFL statistics
- Receptions: 65
- Receiving yards: 683
- Receiving touchdowns: 3
- Return yards: 530
- Stats at Pro Football Reference

Bryan Robert Walters (born November 4, 1987) is an American former professional football player who was a wide receiver in the National Football League (NFL). He played college football for the Cornell Big Red. With the Seattle Seahawks, he won Super Bowl XLVIII over the Denver Broncos.

== College career ==
Walters played college football at Cornell University for the Big Red. He was elected to the Sphinx Head Society at Cornell.

== Professional career ==
=== San Diego Chargers ===
Walters signed with the San Diego Chargers on April 25, 2010, after going undrafted in the 2010 NFL draft.

Walters was released by the Chargers on August 5, 2010, during training camp, due to a hamstring injury, but was re-signed to their practice squad on December 1, 2010. After the 2010 season, Walters signed a future contract with the Chargers on January 12, 2011.

The Chargers released him on March 13, 2012.

=== Minnesota Vikings ===
On April 2, 2012, he signed with the Minnesota Vikings. On August 25, 2012, he was released by the Vikings.

=== Seattle Seahawks ===
After his Vikings stint, Walters was signed to a futures contract by the Seattle Seahawks, the team he grew up rooting for.

Walters was released by the Seahawks on November 9, 2013. Walters was re-signed to the Seahawks' practice squad, and was promoted to the active roster on December 19, 2013, after the suspension of cornerback Brandon Browner. Walters won Super Bowl XLVIII with the Seahawks after they defeated the Denver Broncos, 43–8.

Walters was released by the Seahawks during final roster cuts on August 30, 2014. On September 1, 2014, Walters was re-signed by the Seahawks. He was waived on November 1, 2014. He was re-signed on November 4. The Seahawks would return to the Super Bowl, but lost 28–24 to the New England Patriots in Super Bowl XLIX.

=== Jacksonville Jaguars ===
Walters signed with the Jacksonville Jaguars on March 13, 2015. He was released on September 20, 2015, and was re-signed by the Jaguars two days later on September 22, 2015.

On September 24, 2016, he was released by the Jaguars. He re-signed with the team on September 26.

On March 9, 2017, Walters re-signed with the Jaguars. On May 22, 2017, he was placed on injured reserve after suffering a foot injury. He was released from injured reserve on May 31, 2017.
