= 2017 Jacksonville Jaguars season =

23rd season in franchise history

- Owner: Shahid Khan
- General manager: David Caldwell
- Head coach: Doug Marrone
- Offensive coordinator: Nathaniel Hackett
- Defensive coordinator: Todd Wash
- Home stadium: EverBank Field

Results
- Record: 10–6
- Division place: 1st AFC South
- Playoffs: Won Wild Card Playoffs (vs. Bills) 10–3; Won Divisional Playoffs (at Steelers) 45–42; Lost AFC Championship (at Patriots) 20–24
- All-Pros: DE Calais Campbell (1st team); DL Calais Campbell (2nd team); LB Telvin Smith (2nd team); CB Jalen Ramsey (1st team); CB A. J. Bouye (2nd team)
- Pro Bowlers: DE Calais Campbell; DE Yannick Ngakoue; DT Malik Jackson; LB Telvin Smith; CB A. J. Bouye; CB Jalen Ramsey

Uniform
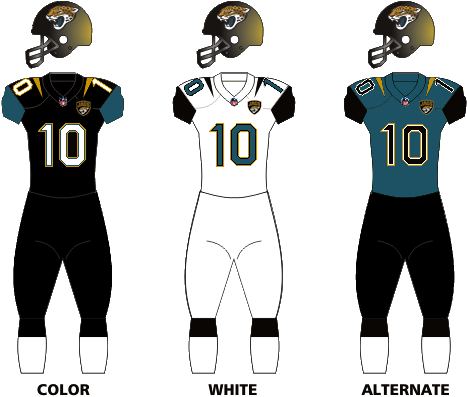

The 2017 season was the Jacksonville Jaguars' 23rd in the National Football League (NFL) and their first under head coach Doug Marrone. Marrone was hired after acting as the team's interim head coach for the final two games of the 2016 season. The team improved on their 3–13 record from 2016 and ended their 10-year playoff drought dating back to 2008 with a Week 15 win over the Houston Texans. They also secured their first winning season since 2007 after a 30–24 win over the Seattle Seahawks. On December 24, 2017, they clinched their third division title, and their first AFC South title following a Tennessee Titans loss. They won the wild card game against the Buffalo Bills 10–3, then headed to Pittsburgh, beating the Pittsburgh Steelers 45–42 to advance to the AFC Championship to face the New England Patriots, the first time that they had made the AFC Championship Game since 1999. Despite leading for much of the game, the Jaguars allowed two fourth quarter touchdowns, and ultimately lost to the Patriots 24–20.

The biggest catalyst for the Jaguars success during the 2017 season was their defense, which was nicknamed Sacksonville. Jacksonville finished in the top of the league in multiple defensive categories, and were considered "historically good" by some analysts. The Jaguars defense led the league in forced fumbles (17), completion percentage (56.8), passing yards allowed per game (169.9), passer rating (68.5) and defensive touchdowns (7). They also finished second in sacks (55), interceptions (21), total takeaways (33), yards allowed per game (286.1) and points allowed per game (16.8). Along with their spectacular defense, the Jaguars were also the top rushing offense in the NFL, averaging 141 rush yards per game.

The Jaguars would neither make the playoffs nor win the division again until 2022.

== Offseason ==
=== Unrestricted free agents ===
Position	Player	Free agency tag	2017 team	Date signed
DE	Tyson Alualu	UFA	Pittsburgh Steelers	March 21, 2017
CB	Prince Amukamara	UFA	Chicago Bears	March 10, 2017
RB	Joe Banyard	UFA	Buffalo Bills	March 17, 2017
OT	Kelvin Beachum	UFA	New York Jets	March 10, 2017
WR	Arrelious Benn	UFA	Jacksonville Jaguars	February 15, 2017
SS	Johnathan Cyprien	UFA	Tennessee Titans	March 9, 2017
SS	Akeem Davis	UFA		
TE	Alex Ellis	ERFA		
QB	Chad Henne	ERFA	Jacksonville Jaguars	February 15, 2017
RB	Bronson Hill	ERFA	Minnesota Vikings	August 12, 2017
DT	Jordan Hill	UFA	Detroit Lions	March 20, 2017
G	Luke Joeckel	UFA	Seattle Seahawks	March 9, 2017
DT	Abry Jones	UFA	Jacksonville Jaguars	February 15, 2017
G	Patrick Omameh	UFA	Jacksonville Jaguars	March 10, 2017
T	Jeremiah Poutasi	UFA		
RB	Denard Robinson	UFA		
RB	Daryl Richardson	RFA		
OLB	Marcus Rush	ERFA		
C	Tyler Shatley	RFA	Jacksonville Jaguars	February 21, 2017
TE	Julius Thomas	RFA	Miami Dolphins	March 9, 2017
FS	Peyton Thompson	RFA	Jacksonville Jaguars	February 6, 2017
WR	Bryan Walters	UFA	Jacksonville Jaguars	March 9, 2017
WR	Tony Washington	ERFA		
OT	Josh Wells	RFA	Jacksonville Jaguars	February 17, 2017
WR	Shane Wynn	ERFA	Jacksonville Jaguars	
RFA: Restricted free agent, UFA: Unrestricted free agent, ERFA: Exclusive rights free agent

=== Acquisitions ===
Position	Player	2016 Team	Date signed
OT	Branden Albert	Miami Dolphins	March 9, 2017
CB	A. J. Bouye	Houston Texans	March 9, 2017
DE	Calais Campbell	Arizona Cardinals	March 10, 2017
DT	Stefan Charles	Detroit Lions	March 11, 2017
S	Barry Church	Dallas Cowboys	March 10, 2017
MLB	Audie Cole	Minnesota Vikings	March 11, 2017
OLB	Lerentee McCray	Buffalo Bills	March 9, 2017
G	Greg Van Roten	Toronto Argonauts	February 27, 2017
G	Earl Watford	Arizona Cardinals	March 11, 2017

Indicates that the player was a free agent at the end of his respective team's 2016 season.

=== NFL draft ===
2017 Jacksonville Jaguars draft
Round	Pick	Player	Position	College	Notes
1	4	Leonard Fournette	Running back	LSU	
2	34	Cam Robinson	Offensive tackle	Alabama	
3	68	Dawuane Smoot	Defensive end	Illinois	
4	110	Dede Westbrook	Wide receiver	Oklahoma	
5	148	Blair Brown	Linebacker	Ohio	
7	222	Jalen Myrick	Cornerback	Minnesota	
7	240	Marquez Williams	Fullback	Miami (FL)	
Made roster † Pro Football Hall of Fame * Made at least one Pro Bowl during career

Draft trades

- The Jaguars traded TE Julius Thomas to Miami for its seventh-round selection (240th).
- The Jaguars traded their second- and sixth-round selections (35th and 187th) to Seattle for its second-round selection (34th).

== Staff ==
2017 Jacksonville Jaguars staff
Front office: Owner – Shahid Khan; President – Mark Lamping; Executive vice president of football operations – Tom Coughlin; General manager – David Caldwell; Senior vice president of football administration & technology – Tony Khan; Special assistant to the general manager – John Idzik Jr.; Director of football administration – Tim Walsh; Director of football operations – Hamzah Ahmad; Director of professional scouting – Chris Polian; Assistant director of player personnel – Andy Dengler; Director of pro personnel – Chris Driggers; Assistant director of pro personnel – DeJuan Polk; Director of college scouting – Mark Ellenz; Assistant director of college scouting – Paul Roell; Director of player development and youth football – Marcus Pollard; Assistant to the head coach/administrator of coaching operations – ElizaBeth Mayers; Head coaches: Head coach – Doug Marrone; Assistant to the head coach – Tyler Wolf; Offensive coaches: Offensive coordinator – Nathaniel Hackett; Quarterbacks – Scott Milanovich; Running backs – Tyrone Wheatley; Wide receivers – Keenan McCardell; Tight ends – Ron Middleton; Offensive line – Pat Flaherty; Assistant offensive line – Tony Sparano; Offensive assistant – John Donovan; Offense research – Eric Price	Defensive coaches: Defensive coordinator – Todd Wash; Defensive line – Marion Hobby; Assistant defensive line – Jason Rebrovich; Linebackers – Mark Collins; Secondary – Perry Fewell; Assistant defensive backs – Joe Danna; Defensive assistant – Mike Rutenberg; Special teams coaches: Special teams coordinator – Joe DeCamillis; Assistant special teams – Mike Mallory; Strength and conditioning: Strength and conditioning coordinator – Tom Myslinski; Assistant strength and conditioning – Cedric Scott; Strength and conditioning associate – Jess Langvardt

== Final roster ==
2017 Jacksonville Jaguars roster
Quarterbacks (QB): 5 Blake Bortles; 7 Chad Henne; Running backs (RB): 40 Tommy Bohanon FB; 27 Leonard Fournette; 30 Corey Grant; 33 Chris Ivory; 24 T. J. Yeldon; Wide receivers (WR): 84 Keelan Cole; 16 Montay Crockett; 88 Allen Hurns; 11 Marqise Lee; 85 Jaydon Mickens; 12 Dede Westbrook; Tight ends (TE): 83 Ben Koyack; 89 Marcedes Lewis; 80 James O'Shaughnessy	Offensive linemen (OL): 60 A. J. Cann G; 65 Brandon Linder C; 77 Patrick Omameh G; 78 Jermey Parnell T; 75 Will Poehls T; 64 Chris Reed G; 74 Cam Robinson T; 69 Tyler Shatley C; 73 Josh Walker G; 72 Josh Wells T; Defensive linemen (DL): 54 Eli Ankou DT; 93 Calais Campbell DE; 99 Marcell Dareus DT; 56 Dante Fowler DE; 97 Malik Jackson DT; 95 Abry Jones DT; 91 Yannick Ngakoue DE; 59 Carroll Phillips DE; 94 Dawuane Smoot DE	Linebackers (LB): 53 Blair Brown OLB; 44 Myles Jack OLB; 55 Lerentee McCray OLB; 52 Donald Payne MLB; 51 Paul Posluszny MLB; 50 Telvin Smith OLB; Defensive backs (DB): 21 A. J. Bouye CB; 42 Barry Church SS; 22 Aaron Colvin CB; 39 Tashaun Gipson FS; 31 Jalen Myrick CB; 23 Tyler Patmon CB; 20 Jalen Ramsey CB; 25 Peyton Thompson FS; 26 Jarrod Wilson SS; Special teams (ST): 49 Colin Holba LS; 4 Josh Lambo K; 3 Brad Nortman P	Practice squad: 41 Tim Cook RB (IR); 79 Hunter Dimick DE; 57 Brooks Ellis LB; 66 Avery Gennesy G (IR); 86 David Grinnage TE; 90 Darius Kilgo DT; 58 Deon King OLB; 38 Charlie Miller FS; 29 Sammy Seamster CB; 17 Tevaun Smith WR; 70 Brandon Thomas G; 38 Brandon Wilds RB; Reserve: -- Arrelious Benn WR (IR); 96 Michael Bennett DT (IR); 34 Tyler Gaffney RB (IR); 13 Rashad Greene WR (IR); 35 Jarrod Harper S (IR); 43 I'Tavius Mathers RB (IR); 43 Matt Overton LS (IR); 18 Larry Pinkard WR (IR); 81 Mychal Rivera TE (IR); 15 Allen Robinson WR (IR); 10 Jaelen Strong WR (IR); 46 Carson Tinker LS (IR); 14 Shane Wynn WR (IR); Rookies in italics 53 active, 15 reserve, 10 practice squad

== Preseason ==
Week	Date	Opponent	Result	Record	Venue	Recap
1	August 10	at New England Patriots	W 31–24	1–0	Gillette Stadium	Recap
2	August 17	Tampa Bay Buccaneers	L 8–12	1–1	EverBank Field	Recap
3	August 24	Carolina Panthers	L 23–24	1–2	EverBank Field	Recap
4	August 31	at Atlanta Falcons	W 13–7	2–2	Mercedes-Benz Stadium	Recap

== Regular season ==
=== Schedule ===
On December 13, 2016, the NFL announced that the Jaguars would play host to the Baltimore Ravens at Wembley Stadium in London, England, as part of their commitment to the London Games. The game occurred during Week 3 (Sunday, September 24), and was televised in the United States. The kickoff was announced in conjunction with the release of the regular season schedule.

The remainder of the Jaguars' 2017 schedule was finalized and announced on April 20.

Week	Date	Opponent	Result	Record	Venue	Recap
1	September 10	at **Houston Texans**	**W** 29–7	1–0	NRG Stadium	Recap
2	September 17	**Tennessee Titans**	**L** 16–37	1–1	EverBank Field	Recap
3	September 24	Baltimore Ravens	**W** 44–7	2–1	(United Kingdom) Wembley Stadium (London)	Recap
4	October 1	at New York Jets	**L** 20–23 (OT)	2–2	MetLife Stadium	Recap
5	October 8	at Pittsburgh Steelers	**W** 30–9	3–2	Heinz Field	Recap
6	October 15	Los Angeles Rams	**L** 17–27	3–3	EverBank Field	Recap
7	October 22	at **Indianapolis Colts**	**W** 27–0	4–3	Lucas Oil Stadium	Recap
8	Bye					
9	November 5	Cincinnati Bengals	**W** 23–7	5–3	EverBank Field	Recap
10	November 12	Los Angeles Chargers	**W** 20–17 (OT)	6–3	EverBank Field	Recap
11	November 19	at Cleveland Browns	**W** 19–7	7–3	FirstEnergy Stadium	Recap
12	November 26	at Arizona Cardinals	**L** 24–27	7–4	University of Phoenix Stadium	Recap
13	December 3	**Indianapolis Colts**	**W** 30–10	8–4	EverBank Field	Recap
14	December 10	Seattle Seahawks	**W** 30–24	9–4	EverBank Field	Recap
15	December 17	**Houston Texans**	**W** 45–7	10–4	EverBank Field	Recap
16	December 24	at San Francisco 49ers	**L** 33–44	10–5	Levi's Stadium	Recap
17	December 31	at **Tennessee Titans**	**L** 10–15	10–6	Nissan Stadium	Recap

Note: Intra-division opponents are in bold text.

=== Game summaries ===
==== Week 1: at Houston Texans ====
Week One: Jacksonville Jaguars at Houston Texans – Game summary

Quarter	1	2	3	4	Total
**Jaguars**	3	16	7	3	**29**
Texans	0	0	7	0	**7**

at NRG Stadium, Houston, Texas

- Date: September 10
- Game time: 1:00 p.m. EDT/12:00 p.m. CDT
- Game weather: Played indoors (retractable roof closed)
- Game attendance: 71,710
- Referee: Tony Corrente
- TV announcers (CBS): Andrew Catalon, James Lofton and Steve Tasker
- Recap, Gamebook

Game information

**First quarter**

- JAX – Jason Myers 42-yard field goal, 12:08. Jaguars 3–0. **Drive: 8 plays, 51 yards, 2:52.**

**Second quarter**

- JAX – Jason Myers 25-yard field goal, 14:49. Jaguars 6–0. **Drive: 10 plays, 77 yards, 5:14.**
- JAX – Leonard Fournette 1-yard run (kick failed), 2:02. Jaguars 12–0. **Drive: 9 plays, 53 yards, 5:29.**
- JAX – Dante Fowler 53-yard fumble return (Jason Myers kick), 0:49 Jaguars 19–0.

**Third quarter**

- HOU – DeAndre Hopkins 4-yard pass from Deshaun Watson (Kaʻimi Fairbairn kick), 9:09. Jaguars 19–7. **Drive: 14 plays, 75 yards, 5:51.**
- JAX – Tommy Bohanon 1-yard pass from Blake Bortles (Jason Myers kick), 4:14. Jaguars 26–7. **Drive: 10 plays, 75 yards, 4:55.**

**Fourth quarter**

- JAX – Jason Myers 38-yard field goal, 3:11. Jaguars 29–7. **Drive: 4 plays, 7 yards, 0:20.**

**Top passers**

- JAX – Blake Bortles – 11/21, 125 yards, TD
- HOU – Deshaun Watson – 12/23, 102 yards, TD, INT

**Top rushers**

- JAX – Leonard Fournette – 26 rushes, 100 yards, TD
- HOU – Lamar Miller – 17 rushes, 65 yards

**Top receivers**

- JAX – Allen Hurns – 3 receptions, 42 yards
- HOU – DeAndre Hopkins – 7 receptions, 55 yards, TD

**Top tacklers**

- JAX – Myles Jack – 8 tackles, 6 assists
- HOU – Kareem Jackson – 4 tackles, 2 assists

==== Week 2: vs. Tennessee Titans ====
Week Two: Tennessee Titans at Jacksonville Jaguars – Game summary

Quarter	1	2	3	4	Total
**Titans**	3	3	17	14	**37**
Jaguars	3	0	0	13	**16**

at EverBank Field, Jacksonville, Florida

- Date: September 17
- Game time: 1:00 p.m. EDT
- Game weather: Partly cloudy, 84 °F (29 °C)
- Game attendance: 61,709
- Referee: Ed Hochuli
- TV announcers (CBS): Spero Dedes and Adam Archuleta
- Recap, Gamebook

Game information

**First quarter**

- JAX – Jason Myers 43-yard field goal, 7:24. Jaguars 3–0. **Drive: 12 plays, 51 yards, 6:01.**
- TEN – Ryan Succop 40-yard field goal, 2:16. Tied 3–3. **Drive: 11 plays, 53 yards, 5:08.**

**Second quarter**

- TEN – Ryan Succop 41-yard field goal, 0:00. Titans 6–3. **Drive: 10 plays, 38 yards, 10:47.**

**Third quarter**

- TEN – Ryan Succop 26-yard field goal, 9:24. Titans 9–3. **Drive: 10 plays, 31 yards, 4:40.**
- TEN – Derrick Henry 17-yard run (Ryan Succop kick), 6:36. Titans 16–3. **Drive: 2 plays, 34 yards, 0:46.**
- TEN – Delanie Walker 1-yard run (Ryan Succop kick), 2:49. Titans 23–3. **Drive: 3 plays, 49 yards, 1:34.**

**Fourth quarter**

- TEN – Jonnu Smith 32-yard pass from Marcus Mariota (Ryan Succop kick), 9:57. Titans 30–3. **Drive: 8 plays, 86 yards, 5:19.**
- JAX – Leonard Fournette 1-yard run (pass failed), 7:12. Titans 30–9. **Drive: 6 plays, 75 yards, 2:45.**
- TEN – Jalston Fowler 3-yard run (Ryan Succop kick), 4:14. Titans 37–9. **Drive: 6 plays, 25 yards, 2:58.**
- JAX – Allen Hurns 7-yard pass from Blake Bortles (Jason Myers kick), 2:11. Titans 37–16. **Drive: 6 plays, 77 yards, 2:03.**

**Top passers**

- TEN – Marcus Mariota – 15/27, 215 yards, TD, INT
- JAX – Blake Bortles – 20/34, 223 yards, TD, 2 INT

**Top rushers**

- TEN – Derrick Henry – 14 rushes, 92 yards, TD
- JAX – Leonard Fournette – 14 rushes, 40 yards, TD

**Top receivers**

- TEN – Delanie Walker – 4 receptions, 61 yards,
- JAX – Allen Hurns – 6 receptions, 82 yards, TD

**Top tacklers**

- TEN – Wesley Woodyard – 6 tackles, 3 assists
- JAX – Telvin Smith – 6 tackles, 2 assists

==== Week 3: vs. Baltimore Ravens ====
NFL London Games

Week Three: Baltimore Ravens at Jacksonville Jaguars – Game summary

Quarter	1	2	3	4	Total
Ravens	0	0	0	7	**7**
**Jaguars**	10	13	14	7	**44**

at Wembley Stadium, London, England

- Date: September 24
- Game time: 2:30 p.m. BST/9:30 a.m. EDT
- Game weather: 70 °F (21 °C)
- Game attendance: 84,592
- Referee: Pete Morelli
- TV announcers (Yahoo! Sports, WJAX-TV): Andrew Catalon, James Lofton and Alex Flanagan
- Recap, Gamebook

Game information

**First quarter**

- JAX – Jason Myers 23-yard field goal, 9:05. Jaguars 3–0. **Drive: 9 plays, 58 yards, 4:27.**
- JAX – Marcedes Lewis 17-yard pass from Blake Bortles (Jason Myers kick), 3:32. Jaguars 10–0. **Drive: 7 plays, 80 yards, 3:53.**

**Second quarter**

- JAX – Jason Myers 45-yard field goal, 10:49. Jaguars 13–0. **Drive: 10 plays, 34 yards, 6:16.**
- JAX – Allen Hurns 5-yard pass from Blake Bortles (Jason Myers kick), 4:55. Jaguars 20–0. **Drive: 8 plays, 28 yards, 3:11.**
- JAX – Jason Myers 29-yard field goal, 0:38. Jaguars 23–0. **Drive: 8 plays, 66 yards, 2:15.**

**Third quarter**

- JAX – Marcedes Lewis 30-yard pass from Blake Bortles (Jason Myers kick), 9:42. Jaguars 30–0. **Drive: 2 plays, 32 yards, 0:43.**
- JAX – Marcedes Lewis 4-yard pass from Blake Bortles (Jason Myers kick), 7:48. Jaguars 37–0. **Drive: 2 plays, 3 yards, 0:24.**

**Fourth quarter**

- JAX – Leonard Fournette 4-yard run (Jason Myers kick), 14:56. Jaguars 44–0. **Drive: 7 plays, 85 yards, 3:28.**
- BAL – Benjamin Watson 6-yard pass from Ryan Mallett (Justin Tucker kick), 3:24. Jaguars 44–7. **Drive: 9 plays, 76 yards, 5:09.**

**Top passers**

- BAL – Ryan Mallett – 6/9, 36 yards, TD
- JAX – Blake Bortles – 20/31, 244 yards, 4 TD

**Top rushers**

- BAL – Alex Collins – 9 rushes, 82 yards
- JAX – Corey Grant – 6 rushes, 75 yards

**Top receivers**

- BAL – Nick Boyle – 2 receptions, 14 yards
- JAX – Marqise Lee – 4 receptions, 65 yards

**Top tacklers**

- BAL – C. J. Mosley – 8 tackles
- JAX – Telvin Smith – 7 tackles

==== Week 4: at New York Jets ====
Week Four: Jacksonville Jaguars at New York Jets – Game summary

Quarter	1	2	3	4	OT	Total
Jaguars	7	3	0	10	0	**20**
**Jets**	7	3	10	0	3	**23**

at MetLife Stadium, East Rutherford, New Jersey

- Date: October 1
- Game time: 1:00 p.m. EDT
- Game weather: Sunny, 64 °F (18 °C)
- Game attendance: 77,562
- Referee: Gene Steratore
- TV announcers (CBS): Andrew Catalon and James Lofton
- Recap, Gamebook

Game information

**First quarter**

- JAX – Leonard Fournette 10-yard pass from Blake Bortles (Jason Myers kick), 8:02. Jaguars 7–0. **Drive: 10 plays, 61 yards, 5:15.**
- NYJ – Bilal Powell 75-yard run (Chandler Catanzaro kick), 7:49. Tied 7–7. **Drive: 1 play, 75 yards, 0:13.**

**Second quarter**

- JAX – Jason Myers 30-yard field goal, 5:10. Jaguars 10–7. **Drive: 13 plays, 75 yards, 7:15.**
- NYJ – Chandler Catanzaro 45-yard field goal, 1:11. Tied 10–10. **Drive: 9 plays, 42 yards, 3:59.**

**Third quarter**

- NYJ – Elijah McGuire 69-yard run (Chandler Catanzaro kick), 10:02. Jets 17–10. **Drive: 2 plays, 82 yards, 0:07.**
- NYJ – Chandler Catanzaro 26-yard field goal, 0:34. Jets 20–10. **Drive: 4 plays, -1 yard, 1:31.**

**Fourth quarter**

- JAX – Myles Jack 82-yard fumble return (Jason Myers kick), 10:20 Jets 20–17.
- JAX – Jason Myers 22-yard field goal, 0:46. Tied 20–20. **Drive: 8 plays, 31 yards, 2:33.**

**Overtime**

- NYJ – Chandler Catanzaro 41-yard field goal, 0:28. Jets 23–20. **Drive: 4 plays, 2 yards, 1:10.**

**Top passers**

- JAX – Blake Bortles – 15/35, 140 yards, TD, INT
- NYJ – Josh McCown – 22/31, 224 yards, INT

**Top rushers**

- JAX – Leonard Fournette – 24 rushes, 86 yards
- NYJ – Bilal Powell – 21 rushes, 163 yards, TD

**Top receivers**

- JAX – Leonard Fournette – 4 receptions, 59 yards, TD
- NYJ – Robby Anderson – 3 receptions, 59 yards

**Top tacklers**

- JAX – Telvin Smith – 11 tackles
- NYJ – Demario Davis – 6 tackles

==== Week 5: at Pittsburgh Steelers ====
Week Five: Jacksonville Jaguars at Pittsburgh Steelers – Game summary

Quarter	1	2	3	4	Total
**Jaguars**	0	7	13	10	**30**
Steelers	3	3	3	0	**9**

at Heinz Field, Pittsburgh, Pennsylvania

- Date: October 8
- Game time: 1:00 p.m. EDT
- Game weather: Cloudy, 73 °F (23 °C)
- Game attendance: 66,237
- Referee: John Parry
- TV announcers (CBS): Kevin Harlan and Rich Gannon
- Recap, Gamebook

Game information

**First quarter**

- PIT – Chris Boswell 29-yard field goal, 10:17. Steelers 3–0. **Drive: 7 plays, 72 yards, 3:06.**

**Second quarter**

- JAX – Leonard Fournette 2-yard run (Jason Myers kick), 12:19. Jaguars 7–3. **Drive: 8 plays, 47 yards, 4:05.**
- PIT – Chris Boswell 34-yard field goal, 0:03. Jaguars 7–6. **Drive: 6 plays, 45 yards, 0:38.**

**Third quarter**

- PIT – Chris Boswell 20-yard field goal, 8:54. Steelers 9–7. **Drive: 14 plays, 73 yards, 6:06.**
- JAX – Telvin Smith 28-yard interception return (kick failed), 6:38 Jaguars 13–9.
- JAX – Barry Church 52-yard interception return (Jason Myers kick), 3:59 Jaguars 20–9.

**Fourth quarter**

- JAX – Jason Myers 47-yard field goal, 6:43. Jaguars 23–9. **Drive: 13 plays, 75 yards, 7:15.**
- JAX – Leonard Fournette 90-yard run (Jason Myers kick), 1:47. Jaguars 30–9. **Drive: 3 plays, 98 yards, 1:29.**

**Top passers**

- JAX – Blake Bortles – 8/14, 95 yards, INT
- PIT – Ben Roethlisberger – 33/55, 312 yards, 5 INT

**Top rushers**

- JAX – Leonard Fournette – 28 rushes, 181 yards, 2 TD
- PIT – Le'Veon Bell – 15 rushes, 47 yards

**Top receivers**

- JAX – Marqise Lee – 2 receptions, 49 yards
- PIT – Antonio Brown – 10 receptions, 157 yards

**Top tacklers**

- JAX – Aaron Colvin – 9 tackles, 1 assist
- PIT – Vince Williams – 6 tackles, 2 assists, 1 sack

==== Week 6: vs. Los Angeles Rams ====
Week Six: Los Angeles Rams at Jacksonville Jaguars – Game summary

Quarter	1	2	3	4	Total
**Rams**	17	7	0	3	**27**
Jaguars	14	0	3	0	**17**

at EverBank Field, Jacksonville, Florida

- Date: October 15
- Game time: 4:05 p.m. EDT
- Game weather: 88 °F (31 °C)
- Game attendance: 56,232
- Referee: Walt Coleman
- TV announcers (Fox): Dick Stockton, Mark Schlereth and Shannon Spake
- Recap, Gamebook

Game information

**First quarter**

- LAR – Pharoh Cooper 103-yard kickoff return (Greg Zuerlein kick), 14:46 Rams 7–0.
- JAX – Leonard Fournette 75-yard run (Jason Myers kick), 14:35. Tied 7–7. **Drive: 1 play, 75 yards, 0:11.**
- LAR – Greg Zuerlein 56-yard field goal, 8:54. Rams 10–7. **Drive: 4 plays, 8 yards, 1:29.**
- JAX – Chris Ivory 22-yard pass from Blake Bortles (Jason Myers kick), 6:51. Jaguars 14–10. **Drive: 4 plays, 75 yards, 2:03.**
- LAR – Gerald Everett 4-yard pass from Jared Goff (Greg Zuerlein kick), 0:22. Rams 17–14. **Drive: 7 plays, 66 yards, 3:16.**

**Second quarter**

- LAR – Malcolm Brown 6-yard return of blocked punt (Greg Zuerlein kick), 2:25 Rams 24–14.

**Third quarter**

- JAX – Jason Myers 41-yard field goal, 5:16. Rams 24–17. **Drive: 9 plays, 29 yards, 5:00.**

**Fourth quarter**

- LAR – Greg Zuerlein 29-yard field goal, 2:32. Rams 27–17. **Drive: 12 plays, 57 yards, 5:08.**

**Top passers**

- LAR – Jared Goff – 11/21, 124 yards, TD
- JAX – Blake Bortles – 23/35, 241 yards, TD, INT

**Top rushers**

- LAR – Todd Gurley – 23 rushes, 116 yards
- JAX – Leonard Fournette – 21 rushes, 130 yards, TD

**Top receivers**

- LAR – Robert Woods – 5 receptions, 70 yards
- JAX – Marqise Lee – 5 receptions, 83 yards

**Top tacklers**

- LAR – Connor Barwin – 7 tackles, 1 sack
- JAX – Telvin Smith – 8 tackles, 1 sack

==== Week 7: at Indianapolis Colts ====
Week Seven: Jacksonville Jaguars at Indianapolis Colts – Game summary

Quarter	1	2	3	4	Total
**Jaguars**	14	6	7	0	**27**
Colts	0	0	0	0	**0**

at Lucas Oil Stadium, Indianapolis, Indiana

- Date: October 22
- Game time: 1:00 p.m. EDT
- Game weather: Played indoors (retractable roof closed)
- Game attendance: 63,104
- Referee: Jeff Triplette
- TV announcers (CBS): Tom McCarthy, Steve Beuerlein and Steve Tasker
- Recap, Gamebook

Game information

**First quarter**

- JAX – Chris Ivory 1-yard run (Josh Lambo kick), 9:30. Jaguars 7–0. **Drive: 12 plays, 75 yards, 5:30.**
- JAX – Marcedes Lewis 5-yard pass from Blake Bortles (Josh Lambo kick), 5:01. Jaguars 14–0. **Drive: 4 plays, 70 yards, 1:54.**

**Second quarter**

- JAX – Josh Lambo 42-yard field goal, 7:38. Jaguars 17–0. **Drive: 12 plays, 67 yards, 6:35.**
- JAX – Josh Lambo 33-yard field goal, 1:56. Jaguars 20–0. **Drive: 8 plays, 66 yards, 3:51.**

**Third quarter**

- JAX – T.J. Yeldon 58-yard run (Josh Lambo kick), 5:58. Jaguars 27–0. **Drive: 6 plays, 91 yards, 2:42.**

**Fourth quarter**

- No scoring plays.

**Top passers**

- JAX – Blake Bortles – 18/26, 330 yards, TD
- IND – Jacoby Brissett – 22/37, 200 yards

**Top rushers**

- JAX – T.J. Yeldon – 9 rushes, 122 yards, TD
- IND – Frank Gore – 9 rushes, 34 yards

**Top receivers**

- JAX – Allen Hurns – 5 receptions, 101 yards
- IND – Jack Doyle – 6 receptions, 44 yards

**Top tacklers**

- JAX – Telvin Smith – 7 tackles, 3 assists
- IND – Antonio Morrison – 8 tackles, 5 assists

==== Week 9: vs. Cincinnati Bengals ====
Week Nine: Cincinnati Bengals at Jacksonville Jaguars – Game summary

Quarter	1	2	3	4	Total
Bengals	0	7	0	0	**7**
**Jaguars**	3	10	3	7	**23**

at EverBank Field, Jacksonville, Florida

- Date: November 5
- Game time: 1:00 p.m. EST
- Game weather: 78 °F (26 °C)
- Game attendance: 60,720
- Referee: Brad Allen
- TV announcers (CBS): Andrew Catalon and James Lofton
- Recap, Gamebook

Game information

**First quarter**

- JAX – Josh Lambo 32-yard field goal, 2:34. Jaguars 3–0. **Drive: 9 plays, 71 yards, 4:01.**

**Second quarter**

- JAX – Marqise Lee 3-yard pass from Blake Bortles (Josh Lambo kick), 6:57. Jaguars 10–0. **Drive: 15 plays, 96 yards, 7:55.**
- CIN – Joe Mixon 7-yard run (Marshall Koehn kick), 4:13. Jaguars 10–7. **Drive: 5 plays, 80 yards, 2:44.**
- JAX – Josh Lambo 56-yard field goal, 0:23. Jaguars 13–7. **Drive: 11 plays, 37 yards, 3:50.**

**Third quarter**

- JAX – Josh Lambo 25-yard field goal, 6:51. Jaguars 16–7. **Drive: 9 plays, 79 yards, 4:39.**

Fourth quarter'

- JAX – Jaydon Mickens 63-yard punt return (Josh Lambo kick), 14:35. Jaguars 23–7.

**Top passers**

- CIN – Andy Dalton – 10/18, 136 yards
- JAX – Blake Bortles – 24/38, 259 yards, TD

**Top rushers**

- CIN – Joe Mixon – 13 rushes, 31 yards, TD
- JAX – Chris Ivory – 20 rushes, 69 yards

**Top receivers**

- CIN – Tyler Kroft – 2 receptions, 79 yards
- JAX – Marqise Lee – 8 receptions, 75 yards, TD

**Top tacklers**

- CIN – George Iloka – 7 tackles
- JAX – Barry Church – 3 tackles, 2 assists

==== Week 10: vs. Los Angeles Chargers ====
Week Ten: Los Angeles Chargers at Jacksonville Jaguars – Game summary

Quarter	1	2	3	4	OT	Total
Chargers	0	7	7	3	0	**17**
**Jaguars**	6	0	8	3	3	**20**

at EverBank Field, Jacksonville, Florida

- Date: November 12
- Game time: 1:00 p.m. EST
- Game weather: Partly cloudy, 76 °F (24 °C)
- Game attendance: 60,835
- Referee: Ronald Torbert
- TV announcers (CBS): Andrew Catalon and James Lofton
- Recap, Gamebook

Game information

**First quarter**

- JAX – Corey Grant 56-yard run (kick blocked), 0:24. Jaguars 6–0. **Drive: 8 plays, 90 yards, 3:56.**

**Second quarter**

- LAC – Austin Ekeler 28-yard pass from Philip Rivers (Nick Novak kick), 0:47. Chargers 7–6. **Drive: 7 plays, 87 yards, 2:59.**

**Third quarter**

- LAC – Austin Ekeler 22-yard pass from Philip Rivers (Nick Novak kick), 10:29. Chargers 14–6. **Drive: 6 plays, 76 yards, 3:23.**
- JAX – Marqise Lee 6-yard pass from Blake Bortles (pass succeeded), 2:03. Tied 14–14. **Drive: 11 plays, 84 yards, 4:12.**

**Fourth quarter**

- LAC – Nick Novak 50-yard field goal, 10:35. Chargers 17–14. **Drive: 7 plays, 45 yards, 3:19.**
- JAX – Josh Lambo 34-yard field goal, 0:03. Tied 17–17. **Drive: 6 plays, 36 yards, 0:53.**

**Overtime**

- JAX – Josh Lambo 30-yard field goal, 3:12. Jaguars 20–17. **Drive: 4 plays, 5 yards, 1:59.**

**Top passers**

- LAC – Philip Rivers – 21/37, 235 yards, 2 TD, INT
- JAX – Blake Bortles – 28/51, 273 yards, TD, 2 INT

**Top rushers**

- LAC – Austin Ekeler – 10 rushes, 42 yards
- JAX – Corey Grant – 1 rush, 56 yards

**Top receivers**

- LAC – Austin Ekeler – 5 receptions, 77 yards, 2 TD
- JAX – Allen Hurns – 7 receptions, 70 yards

**Top tacklers**

- LAC – Denzel Perryman – 8 tackles, 1 assist
- JAX – Myles Jack – 8 tackles, 1 assist

==== Week 11: at Cleveland Browns ====
Week Eleven: Jacksonville Jaguars at Cleveland Browns – Game summary

Quarter	1	2	3	4	Total
**Jaguars**	7	3	0	9	**19**
Browns	0	7	0	0	**7**

at FirstEnergy Stadium, Cleveland, Ohio

- Date: November 19
- Game time: 1:00 p.m. EST
- Game weather: Cold, 38 °F (3 °C)
- Game attendance: 57,003
- Referee: Pete Morelli
- TV announcers (CBS): Andrew Catalon and James Lofton
- Recap, Gamebook

Game information

**First quarter**

- JAX – Marcedes Lewis 10-yard pass from Blake Bortles (Josh Lambo kick), 6:54. Jaguars 7–0. **Drive: 4 plays, 33 yards, 1:42.**

**Second quarter**

- JAX – Josh Lambo 38-yard field goal, 14:14. Jaguars 10–0. **Drive: 8 plays, 47 yards, 3:33.**
- CLE – Duke Johnson 27-yard pass from DeShone Kizer (Zane Gonzalez kick), 11:28. Jaguars 10–7. **Drive: 5 plays, 66 yards, 2:46.**

**Third quarter**

- No scoring plays

**Fourth quarter**

- JAX – Josh Lambo 39-yard field goal, 3:31. Jaguars 13–7. **Drive: 8 plays, 31 yards, 4:52.**
- JAX – Telvin Smith fumble recovery in the end zone (run failed), 1:14. Jaguars 19–7.

**Top passers**

- JAX – Blake Bortles – 17/30, 154 yards, TD
- CLE – DeShone Kizer – 15/28, 179 yards, TD, 2 INT

**Top rushers**

- JAX – Leonard Fournette – 28 rushes, 111 yards
- CLE – DeShone Kizer – 5 rushes, 22 yards

**Top receivers**

- JAX – Marqise Lee – 5 receptions, 45 yards
- CLE – Corey Coleman – 6 receptions, 80 yards

**Top tacklers**

- JAX – Jalen Ramsey – 4 tackles, 2 assists
- CLE – Christian Kirksey – 8 tackles, 5 assists, 1 sack, 1 forced fumble

==== Week 12: at Arizona Cardinals ====
Week Twelve: Jacksonville Jaguars at Arizona Cardinals – Game summary

Quarter	1	2	3	4	Total
Jaguars	0	3	7	14	**24**
**Cardinals**	3	10	3	11	**27**

at University of Phoenix Stadium, Glendale, Arizona

- Date: November 26
- Game time: 4:25 p.m. EST/2:25 p.m. MST
- Game weather: Played indoors (retractable roof closed)
- Game attendance: 63,891
- Referee: Clete Blakeman
- TV announcers (CBS): Spero Dedes and Adam Archuleta
- Recap, Gamebook

Game information

**First quarter**

- ARI – Phil Dawson 34-yard field goal, 8:22. Cardinals 3–0. **Drive: 9 plays, 51 yards, 4:51.**

**Second quarter**

- ARI – Phil Dawson 42-yard field goal, 9:00. Cardinals 6–0. **Drive: 5 plays, 36 yards, 2:08.**
- ARI – Ricky Seals-Jones 29-yard pass from Blaine Gabbert (Phil Dawson kick), 4:44. Cardinals 13–0. **Drive: 4 plays, 41 yards, 2:07.**
- JAX – Josh Lambo 43-yard field goal, 0:15. Cardinals 13–3. **Drive: 8 plays, 31 yards, 1:45.**

**Third quarter**

- ARI – Phil Dawson 48-yard field goal, 11:29. Cardinals 16–3. **Drive: 8 plays, 45 yards, 3:31.**
- JAX – Blake Bortles 1-yard run (Josh Lambo kick), 7:33. Cardinals 16–10. **Drive: 7 plays, 75 yards, 3:56.**

**Fourth quarter**

- JAX – Calais Campbell 10-yard fumble return (Josh Lambo kick), 12:10. Jaguars 17–16.
- ARI – Jaron Brown 52-yard pass from Blaine Gabbert (pass succeeded), 9:07. Cardinals 24–17. **Drive: 6 plays, 75 yards, 3:03.**
- JAX – Blake Bortles 17-yard run (Josh Lambo kick), 7:26. Tied 24–24. **Drive: 4 plays, 38 yards, 1:41.**
- ARI – Phil Dawson 57-yard field goal, 0:01. Cardinals 27–24. **Drive: 3 plays, 22 yards, 0:15.**

**Top passers**

- JAX – Blake Bortles – 19/33, 160 yards, INT
- ARI – Blaine Gabbert – 22/38, 241 yards, 2 TD, INT

**Top rushers**

- JAX – Blake Bortles – 6 carries, 62 yards, 2 TD
- ARI – Adrian Peterson – 20 carries, 79 yards

**Top receivers**

- JAX – Dede Westbrook – 6 receptions, 41 yards
- ARI – Ricky Seals-Jones – 4 receptions, 72 yards

**Top tacklers**

- JAX – Barry Church – 8 tackles, 1 assist, INT
- ARI – Josh Bynes – 7 tackles, 1 assist, 1 forced fumble

==== Week 13: vs. Indianapolis Colts ====
Week Thirteen: Indianapolis Colts at Jacksonville Jaguars – Game summary

Quarter	1	2	3	4	Total
Colts	0	3	7	0	**10**
**Jaguars**	7	9	11	3	**30**

at EverBank Field, Jacksonville, Florida

- Date: December 3
- Game time: 1:00 p.m. EST
- Game weather: Partly cloudy, 70 °F (21 °C)
- Game attendance: 61,207
- Referee: Bill Vinovich
- TV announcers (CBS): Kevin Harlan, Rich Gannon and Melanie Collins
- Recap, Gamebook

Game information

**First quarter**

- JAX – Marqise Lee 4-yard pass from Blake Bortles (Josh Lambo kick), 6:18. Jaguars 7–0. **Drive: 11 plays, 80 yards, 5:18.**

**Second quarter**

- JAX – Josh Lambo 30-yard field goal, 12:43. Jaguars 10–0. **Drive: 11 plays, 57 yards, 5:14.**
- IND – Adam Vinatieri 27-yard field goal, 7:02. Jaguars 10–3. **Drive: 10 plays, 69 yards, 5:41.**
- JAX – Keelan Cole 8-yard pass from Blake Bortles (kick aborted, pass failed), 1:55. Jaguars 16–3. **Drive: 12 plays, 75 yards, 5:07.**

**Third quarter**

- JAX – Leonard Fournette 5-yard run (pass succeeded), 10:34. Jaguars 24–3. **Drive: 8 plays, 67 yards, 4:26.**
- IND – T. Y. Hilton 40-yard pass from Jacoby Brissett (Adam Vinatieri kick), 6:40. Jaguars 24–10. **Drive: 9 plays, 75 yards, 2:54.**
- JAX – Josh Lambo 23-yard field goal, 0:34. Jaguars 27–10. **Drive: 11 plays, 81 yards, 6:06.**

**Fourth quarter**

- JAX – Josh Lambo 39-yard field goal, 2:53. Jaguars 30–10. **Drive: 6 plays, 31 yards, 3:10.**

**Top passers**

- IND – Jacoby Brissett – 21/36, 174 yards, TD, 2 INT
- JAX – Blake Bortles – 26/35, 309 yards, 2 TD

**Top rushers**

- IND – Frank Gore – 13 carries, 61 yards
- JAX – Leonard Fournette – 20 carries, 57 yards, TD

**Top receivers**

- IND – T. Y. Hilton – 3 receptions, 51 yards, TD
- JAX – Marqise Lee – 7 receptions, 86 yards, TD

**Top tacklers**

- IND – Matthias Farley – 5 tackles, 2 assists
- JAX – Paul Posluszny – 10 tackles, 4 assists, 1.5 sacks

==== Week 14: vs. Seattle Seahawks ====
Week Fourteen: Seattle Seahawks at Jacksonville Jaguars – Game summary

Quarter	1	2	3	4	Total
Seahawks	0	0	10	14	**24**
**Jaguars**	3	0	21	6	**30**

at EverBank Field, Jacksonville, Florida

- Date: December 10
- Game time: 4:25 p.m. EST
- Game weather: Sunny, 54 °F (12 °C)
- Game attendance: 64,431
- Referee: Gene Steratore
- TV announcers (Fox): Chris Myers, Daryl Johnston and Laura Okmin
- Recap, Gamebook

Game information

**First quarter**

- JAX – Josh Lambo 38-yard field goal, 6:26. Jaguars 3–0. **Drive: 9 plays, 73 yards, 3:57.**

**Second quarter**

- No scoring plays.

**Third quarter**

- JAX – Dede Westbrook 18-yard pass from Blake Bortles (Josh Lambo kick), 12:02. Jaguars 10–0. **Drive: 5 plays, 42 yards, 2:44.**
- SEA – Blair Walsh 28-yard field goal, 8:30. Jaguars 10–3. **Drive: 9 plays, 65 yards, 3:32**
- SEA – Doug Baldwin 26-yard pass from Russell Wilson (Blair Walsh kick), 7:32. Tied 10–10. **Drive: 2 plays, 25 yards, 0:51.**
- JAX – Keelan Cole 75-yard pass from Blake Bortles (Josh Lambo kick), 7:21. Jaguars 17–10. **Drive: 1 play, 75 yards, 0:11.**
- JAX – Leonard Fournette 1-yard run (Josh Lambo kick), 5:37. Jaguars 24–10. **Drive: 1 play, 1 yard, 0:03.**

**Fourth quarter**

- JAX – Josh Lambo 51-yard field goal, 10:04. Jaguars 27–10. **Drive: 13 plays, 65 yards, 7:31.**
- SEA – Paul Richardson 61-yard pass from Russell Wilson (Blair Walsh kick), 9:48. Jaguars 27–17. **Drive: 1 play, 61 yards, 0:16.**
- JAX – Josh Lambo 32-yard field goal, 4:05. Jaguars 30–17. **Drive: 9 plays, 54 yards, 9:43.**
- SEA – Tyler Lockett 74-yard pass from Russell Wilson (Blair Walsh kick), 3:42. Jaguars 30–24. **Drive: 2 plays, 79 yards, 0:23.**

**Top passers**

- SEA – Russell Wilson – 17/31, 271 yards, 3 TD, 3 INT
- JAX – Blake Bortles – 18/27, 268 yards, 2 TD

**Top rushers**

- SEA – Mike Davis – 15 carries, 66 yards
- JAX – Leonard Fournette – 24 carries, 101 yards, TD

**Top receivers**

- SEA – Paul Richardson – 3 receptions, 72 yards, TD
- JAX – Keelan Cole – 3 receptions, 99 yards, TD

**Top tacklers**

- SEA – Byron Maxwell – 9 tackles
- JAX – Aaron Colvin – 6 tackles

==== Week 15: vs. Houston Texans ====
Week Fifteen: Houston Texans at Jacksonville Jaguars – Game summary

Quarter	1	2	3	4	Total
Texans	0	0	7	0	**7**
**Jaguars**	7	24	7	7	**45**

at EverBank Field, Jacksonville, Florida

- Date: December 17
- Game time: 1:00 p.m. EST
- Game weather: 72 °F (22 °C)
- Game attendance: 64,701
- Referee: Carl Cheffers
- TV announcers (Fox): Chris Myers, Daryl Johnston and Laura Okmin
- Recap, Gamebook

Game information

**First quarter**

- JAX – Tommy Bohanon 1-yard run (Josh Lambo kick), 3:52. Jaguars 7–0. **Drive: 13 plays, 78 yards, 6:52.**

**Second quarter**

- JAX – Jaydon Mickens 5-yard pass from Blake Bortles (Josh Lambo kick), 14:45. Jaguars 14–0. **Drive: 5 plays, 59 yards, 1:59.**
- JAX – Jaydon Mickens 14-yard pass from Blake Bortles (Josh Lambo kick), 10:12. Jaguars 21–0. **Drive: 6 plays, 63 yards, 2:59.**
- JAX – Josh Lambo 38-yard field goal, 0:53. Jaguars 24–0. **Drive: 8 plays, 25 yards, 0:56.**
- JAX – Keelan Cole 9-yard pass from Blake Bortles (Josh Lambo kick), 0:26. Jaguars 31–0. **Drive: 2 plays, 45 yards, 0:11.**

**Third quarter**

- HOU – DeAndre Hopkins 25-yard pass from T.J. Yates (Kaʻimi Fairbairn kick), 8:12. Jaguars 31–7. **Drive: 8 plays, 81 yards, 4:30.**
- JAX – Tommy Bohanon 1-yard run (Josh Lambo kick), 7:13. Jaguars 38–7. **Drive: 3 plays, 74 yards, 0:59.**

**Fourth quarter**

- JAX – Corey Grant 8-yard run (Josh Lambo kick), 10:26. Jaguars 45–7. **Drive: 4 plays, 45 yards, 2:07.**

**Top passers**

- HOU – T.J. Yates – 12/31, 128 yards, TD, INT
- JAX – Blake Bortles – 21/29, 326 yards, 3 TD

**Top rushers**

- HOU – Alfred Blue – 12 carries, 55 yards
- JAX – Corey Grant – 10 carries, 69 yards, TD

**Top receivers**

- HOU – DeAndre Hopkins – 4 receptions, 80 yards, TD
- JAX – Keelan Cole – 7 receptions, 186 yards, TD

**Top tacklers**

- HOU – Marcus Gilchrist – 5 tackles, 1 assist
- JAX – Calais Campbell – 5 tackles, 2 sacks

==== Week 16: at San Francisco 49ers ====
Week Sixteen: Jacksonville Jaguars at San Francisco 49ers – Game summary

Quarter	1	2	3	4	Total
Jaguars	0	16	3	14	**33**
**49ers**	10	6	7	21	**44**

at Levi's Stadium, Santa Clara, California

- Date: December 24
- Game time: 4:05 p.m. EST/1:05 p.m. PST
- Game weather: Cloudy, 52 °F (11 °C)
- Game attendance: 70,133
- Referee: Jeff Triplette
- TV announcers (CBS): Andrew Catalon and James Lofton
- Recap, Gamebook

Game information

**First quarter**

- SF – Jimmy Garoppolo 1-yard run (Robbie Gould kick), 10:18. 49ers 7–0. **Drive: 10 plays, 79 yards, 4:42.**
- SF – Robbie Gould 27-yard field goal, 5:42. 49ers 10–0. **Drive: 9 plays, 54 yards, 3:42.**

**Second quarter**

- SF – Dontae Johnson 50-yard interception return, 11:03. 49ers 16–0.
- JAX – Robbie Gould PAT blocked, returned by Aaron Colvin for 2-point conversion, 11:03. 49ers 16–2.
- JAX – Leonard Fournette 1-yard run (Josh Lambo kick), 5:10. 49ers 16–9. **Drive: 11 plays, 75 yards, 5:53.**
- JAX – Jaelen Strong 5-yard pass from Blake Bortles (Josh Lambo kick), 0:10. Tied 16–16. **Drive: 8 plays, 80 yards, 1:30.**

**Third quarter**

- JAX – Josh Lambo 45-yard field goal, 10:57. Jaguars 19–16. **Drive: 8 plays, 45 yards, 4:03.**
- SF – George Kittle 8-yard pass from Jimmy Garoppolo (Robbie Gould kick), 6:46. 49ers 23–19. **Drive: 5 plays, 26 yards, 1:55.**

**Fourth quarter**

- SF – Trent Taylor 5-yard pass from Jimmy Garoppolo (Robbie Gould kick), 10:39. 49ers 30–19. **Drive: 13 plays, 86 yards, 6:27.**
- SF – Carlos Hyde 6-yard run (Robbie Gould kick), 8:59. 49ers 37–19. **Drive: 3 plays, 18 yards, 1:24.**
- JAX – T.J. Yeldon 1-yard run (pass succeeded), 2:17. 49ers 37–27. **Drive: 16 plays, 85 yards, 4:14.**
- JAX – James O'Shaughnessy 11-yard pass from Blake Bortles (kick failed), 1:50. 49ers 37–33. **Drive: 3 plays, 46 yards, 0:27.**
- SF – Matt Breida 30-yard run (Robbie Gould kick), 1:24. 49ers 44–33. **Drive: 4 plays, 51 yards, 0:26.**

**Top passers**

- JAX – Blake Bortles – 32/50, 382 yards, 2 TD, 3 INT
- SF – Jimmy Garoppolo – 21/30, 242 yards, 2 TD, INT

**Top rushers**

- JAX – Leonard Fournette – 18 carries, 48 yards, TD
- SF – Matt Breida – 11 carries, 74 yards, TD

**Top receivers**

- JAX – Keelan Cole – 6 receptions, 108 yards
- SF – Kyle Juszczyk – 5 receptions, 76 yards

**Top tacklers**

- JAX – Calais Campbell – 5 tackles, 3 assists
- SF – Adrian Colbert – 6 tackles

==== Week 17: at Tennessee Titans ====
Week Seventeen: Jacksonville Jaguars at Tennessee Titans – Game summary

Quarter	1	2	3	4	Total
Jaguars	0	3	0	7	**10**
**Titans**	0	12	3	0	**15**

at Nissan Stadium, Nashville, Tennessee

- Date: December 31
- Game time: 4:25 p.m. EST/3:25 p.m. CST
- Game weather: Clear, 23 °F (−5 °C)
- Game attendance: 65,501
- Referee: Tony Corrente
- TV announcers (CBS): Greg Gumbel, Trent Green and Jamie Erdahl
- Recap, Gamebook

Game information

**First quarter**

- No scoring plays.

**Second quarter**

- TEN – Derrick Henry 66-yard pass from Marcus Mariota (kick blocked), 14:04. Titans 6–0. **Drive: 7 plays, 82 yards, 3:46.**
- JAX – Josh Lambo 41-yard field goal, 10:14. Titans 6–3. **Drive: 9 plays, 58 yards, 3:50.**
- TEN – Ryan Succop 25-yard field goal, 1:21. Titans 9–3. **Drive: 4 plays, 4 yards, 0:28.**
- TEN – Ryan Succop 39-yard field goal, 0:00. Titans 12–3. **Drive: 4 plays, 7 yards, 1:07.**

**Third quarter**

- TEN – Ryan Succop 38-yard field goal, 7:42. Titans 15–3. **Drive: 8 plays, 23 yards, 4:18.**

**Fourth quarter**

- JAX – Yannick Ngakoue 67-yard fumble return (Josh Lambo kick), 10:48 Titans 15–10.

**Top passers**

- JAX – Blake Bortles – 15/34, 158 yards, 2 INT
- TEN – Marcus Mariota – 12/21, 134 yards, TD

**Top rushers**

- JAX – Leonard Fournette – 19 rushes, 69 yards
- TEN – Marcus Mariota – 10 rushes, 60 yards

**Top receivers**

- JAX – Leonard Fournette – 4 receptions, 67 yards
- TEN – Derrick Henry – 1 reception, 66 yards, TD

**Top tacklers**

- JAX – Telvin Smith – 7 tackles, 2 assists
- TEN – Adoree' Jackson – 5 tackles, 1 forced fumble

=== Standings ===
==== Division ====
AFC South
	W	L	T	PCT	DIV	CONF	PF	PA	STK
^{(3)} Jacksonville Jaguars	10	6	0	.625	4–2	9–3	417	268	L2
^{(5)} Tennessee Titans	9	7	0	.563	5–1	8–4	334	356	W1
Indianapolis Colts	4	12	0	.250	2–4	3–9	263	404	W1
Houston Texans	4	12	0	.250	1–5	3–9	338	436	L6

==== Conference ====
AFC
#	Team	Division	W	L	T	PCT	DIV	CONF	SOS	SOV	STK
**Division leaders**
1 (Note: New England claimed the No. 1 seed over Pittsburgh based on head-to-head victory.)	New England Patriots	East	13	3	0	.813	5–1	10–2	.484	.466	W3
2	Pittsburgh Steelers	North	13	3	0	.813	6–0	10–2	.453	.423	W2
3 (Note: Jacksonville claimed the No. 3 seed over Kansas City based on conference record.)	Jacksonville Jaguars	South	10	6	0	.625	4–2	9–3	.434	.394	L2
4	Kansas City Chiefs	West	10	6	0	.625	5–1	8–4	.477	.481	W4
**Wild Cards**
5 (Note: Tennessee finished ahead of Buffalo, Baltimore and Los Angeles Chargers based on conference record, claiming the No. 5 seed. Buffalo and Baltimore finished ahead of Los Angeles Chargers based on conference record. Buffalo claimed the No. 6 seed over Baltimore based on strength of victory.)	Tennessee Titans	South	9	7	0	.563	5–1	8–4	.434	.396	W1
6	Buffalo Bills	East	9	7	0	.563	3–3	7–5	.492	.396	W1
**Did not qualify for the postseason**
7	Baltimore Ravens	North	9	7	0	.563	3–3	7–5	.441	.299	L1
8	Los Angeles Chargers	West	9	7	0	.563	3–3	6–6	.457	.347	W2
9	Cincinnati Bengals	North	7	9	0	.438	3–3	6–6	.465	.321	W2
10 (Note: Oakland finished ahead of Miami based on head-to-head victory.)	Oakland Raiders	West	6	10	0	.375	2–4	5–7	.512	.396	L4
11	Miami Dolphins	East	6	10	0	.375	2–4	5–7	.543	.531	L3
12 (Note: Denver finished ahead of the New York Jets based on head-to-head victory.)	Denver Broncos	West	5	11	0	.313	2–4	4–8	.492	.413	L2
13	New York Jets	East	5	11	0	.313	2–4	5–7	.520	.438	L4
14 (Note: Indianapolis finished ahead of Houston based on head-to-head sweep.)	Indianapolis Colts	South	4	12	0	.250	2–4	3–9	.480	.219	W1
15	Houston Texans	South	4	12	0	.250	1–5	3–9	.516	.375	L6
16	Cleveland Browns	North	0	16	0	.000	0–6	0–12	.520	–	L16
**Tiebreakers** (Note: When breaking ties for three or more teams under the NFL's rules, they are first broken within divisions, then comparing only the highest ranked remaining team from each division.)

== Postseason ==
=== Schedule ===
Playoff round	Date	Opponent (seed)	Result	Record	Venue	Recap
Wild Card	January 7, 2018	Buffalo Bills (6)	W 10–3	1–0	EverBank Field	Recap
Divisional	January 14, 2018	at Pittsburgh Steelers (2)	W 45–42	2–0	Heinz Field	Recap
AFC Championship	January 21, 2018	at New England Patriots (1)	L 20–24	2–1	Gillette Stadium	Recap

=== Game summaries ===
==== AFC Wild Card Playoffs: vs. (6) Buffalo Bills ====
AFC Wild Card Playoffs: (6) Buffalo Bills at (3) Jacksonville Jaguars – Game summary

Quarter	1	2	3	4	Total
Bills	0	3	0	0	3
Jaguars	0	3	7	0	10

at EverBank Field, Jacksonville, Florida

- Date: January 7, 2018
- Game time: 1:05 p.m. EST
- Game weather: 53 °F (12 °C)
- Game attendance: 69,442
- Referee: John Hussey
- TV announcers (CBS): Jim Nantz, Tony Romo, Tracy Wolfson, and Jay Feely
- Recap, Game Book

Game information

First quarter

- No scoring plays.

Second quarter

- BUF – Stephen Hauschka 31-yard field goal, 1:49. Bills 3–0. Drive: 18 plays, 71 yards, 8:06.
- JAX – Josh Lambo 44-yard field goal, 0:02. Tied 3–3. Drive: 6 plays, 27 yards, 0:38.

Third quarter

- JAX – Ben Koyack 1-yard pass from Blake Bortles (Josh Lambo kick), 0:42. Jaguars 10–3. Drive: 15 plays, 86 yards, 8:52.

Fourth quarter

- No scoring plays.

Top passers

- BUF – Tyrod Taylor – 17/37, 134 yards, INT
- JAX – Blake Bortles – 12/23, 87 yards, TD

Top rushers

- BUF – LeSean McCoy – 19 rushes, 75 yards
- JAX – Blake Bortles – 10 rushes, 88 yards

Top receivers

- BUF – LeSean McCoy – 6 receptions, 44 yards
- JAX – Dede Westbrook – 5 receptions, 48 yards

Top tacklers

- BUF – Lorenzo Alexander – 7 tackles, 3 assists, 1 sack
- JAX – Telvin Smith – 9 tackles, 2 assists, 1 forced fumble

==== AFC Divisional Playoffs: at (2) Pittsburgh Steelers ====
AFC Divisional Playoffs: (3) Jacksonville Jaguars at (2) Pittsburgh Steelers – Game summary

Quarter	1	2	3	4	Total
Jaguars	14	14	0	17	45
Steelers	0	14	7	21	42

at Heinz Field, Pittsburgh, Pennsylvania

- Date: January 14, 2018
- Game time: 1:05 p.m. EST
- Game weather: Sunny, 18 °F (−8 °C)
- Game attendance: 64,524
- Referee: Brad Allen
- TV announcers (CBS): Ian Eagle, Dan Fouts, and Evan Washburn
- Recap, Game Book

Game information

1st quarter

- JAX – Leonard Fournette 1-yard run (Josh Lambo kick), 10:40. Jaguars 7–0. Drive: 8 plays, 66 yards, 4:20.
- JAX – Leonard Fournette 18-yard run (Josh Lambo kick), 5:26. Jaguars 14–0. Drive: 1 play, 18 yards, 0:13.

2nd quarter

- JAX – T. J. Yeldon 4-yard run (Josh Lambo kick), 11:31. Jaguars 21–0. Drive: 11 plays, 75 yards, 4:36.
- PIT – Antonio Brown 23-yard pass from Ben Roethlisberger (Chris Boswell kick), 8:20. Jaguars 21–7. Drive: 6 plays, 64 yards, 3:11.
- JAX – Telvin Smith 50-yard fumble return (Josh Lambo kick), 2:20. Jaguars 28–7.
- PIT – Martavis Bryant 36-yard pass from Ben Roethlisberger (Chris Boswell kick), 0:25. Jaguars 28–14. Drive: 7 plays, 51 yards, 1:55.

3rd quarter

- PIT – Le'Veon Bell 19-yard pass from Ben Roethlisberger (Chris Boswell kick), 9:09. Jaguars 28–21. Drive: 10 plays, 77 yards, 5:51.

4th quarter

- JAX – Leonard Fournette 3-yard run (Josh Lambo kick), 10:34. Jaguars 35–21. Drive: 5 plays, 61 yards, 2:10.
- PIT – Antonio Brown 43-yard pass from Ben Roethlisberger (Chris Boswell kick), 9:05. Jaguars 35–28. Drive: 5 plays, 75 yards, 1:29.
- JAX – Tommy Bohanon 14-yard pass from Blake Bortles (Jason Myers kick), 4:19. Jaguars 42–28. Drive: 8 plays, 75 yards, 4:46.
- PIT – Le'Veon Bell 8-yard run (Chris Boswell kick), 2:18. Jaguars 42–35. Drive: 12 plays, 75 yards, 2:01.
- JAX – Josh Lambo 45-yard field goal, 1:45. Jaguars 45–35. Drive: 4 plays, 9 yards, 0:33.
- PIT – JuJu Smith-Schuster 4-yard pass from Ben Roethlisberger (Chris Boswell kick), 0:01. Jaguars 45–42. Drive: 10 plays, 75 yards, 1:44.

Top passers

- JAX – Blake Bortles – 14/26, 214 yards, TD
- PIT – Ben Roethlisberger – 37/58, 469 yards, 5 TD, INT

Top rushers

- JAX – Leonard Fournette – 25 rushes, 109 yards, 3 TD
- PIT – Le'Veon Bell – 16 rushes, 67 yards, TD

Top receivers

- JAX – T. J. Yeldon – 3 receptions, 57 yards
- PIT – Antonio Brown – 7 receptions, 132 yards, 2 TD

Top tacklers

- JAX – Telvin Smith – 14 tackles, 2 assists, TD
- PIT – Sean Davis – 9 tackles, 3 assists

==== AFC Championship: at (1) New England Patriots ====
AFC Championship: (3) Jacksonville Jaguars at (1) New England Patriots – Game summary

Quarter	1	2	3	4	Total
Jaguars	0	14	3	3	20
Patriots	3	7	0	14	24

at Gillette Stadium, Foxborough, Massachusetts

- Date: January 21, 2018
- Game time: 3:05 p.m. EST
- Game weather: Clear and cool, 48 °F (9 °C)
- Game attendance: 65,878
- Referee: Clete Blakeman
- TV announcers (CBS): Jim Nantz, Tony Romo, Tracy Wolfson, and Jay Feely
- Recap, Game Book

Game information

First quarter

- NE – Stephen Gostkowski 31-yard field goal, 9:21. Patriots 3–0. Drive: 10 plays, 62 yards, 5:39.

Second quarter

- JAX – Marcedes Lewis 4-yard pass from Blake Bortles (Josh Lambo kick), 14:15. Jaguars 7–3. Drive: 7 plays, 76 yards, 3:36.
- JAX – Leonard Fournette 4-yard run (Josh Lambo kick), 7:06. Jaguars 14–3. Drive: 10 plays, 77 yards, 6:07.
- NE – James White 1-yard run (Stephen Gostkowski kick), 0:55. Jaguars 14–10. Drive: 6 plays, 85 yards, 1:07.

Third quarter

- JAX – Josh Lambo 54-yard field goal, 10:23. Jaguars 17–10. Drive: 9 plays, 39 yards, 4:37.

Fourth quarter

- JAX – Josh Lambo 43-yard field goal, 14:52. Jaguars 20–10. Drive: 11 plays, 66 yards, 4:49.
- NE – Danny Amendola 9-yard pass from Tom Brady (Stephen Gostkowski kick), 8:44. Jaguars 20–17. Drive: 8 plays, 85 yards, 3:19.
- NE – Danny Amendola 4-yard pass from Tom Brady (Stephen Gostkowski kick), 2:48. Patriots 24–20. Drive: 5 plays, 30 yards, 2:10.

Top passers

- JAX – Blake Bortles – 23/36, 293 yards, TD
- NE – Tom Brady – 26/38, 290 yards, 2 TD

Top rushers

- JAX – Leonard Fournette – 24 rushes, 76 yards, TD
- NE – Dion Lewis – 9 rushes, 34 yards

Top receivers

- JAX – Allen Hurns – 6 receptions, 80 yards
- NE – Danny Amendola – 7 receptions, 84 yards, 2 TD

Top tacklers

- JAX – Telvin Smith – 8 tackles
- NE – Kyle Van Noy – 5 tackles, 4 assists, 1 sack, 1 forced fumble
