= A. J. Bouye =

American football player (born 1991)

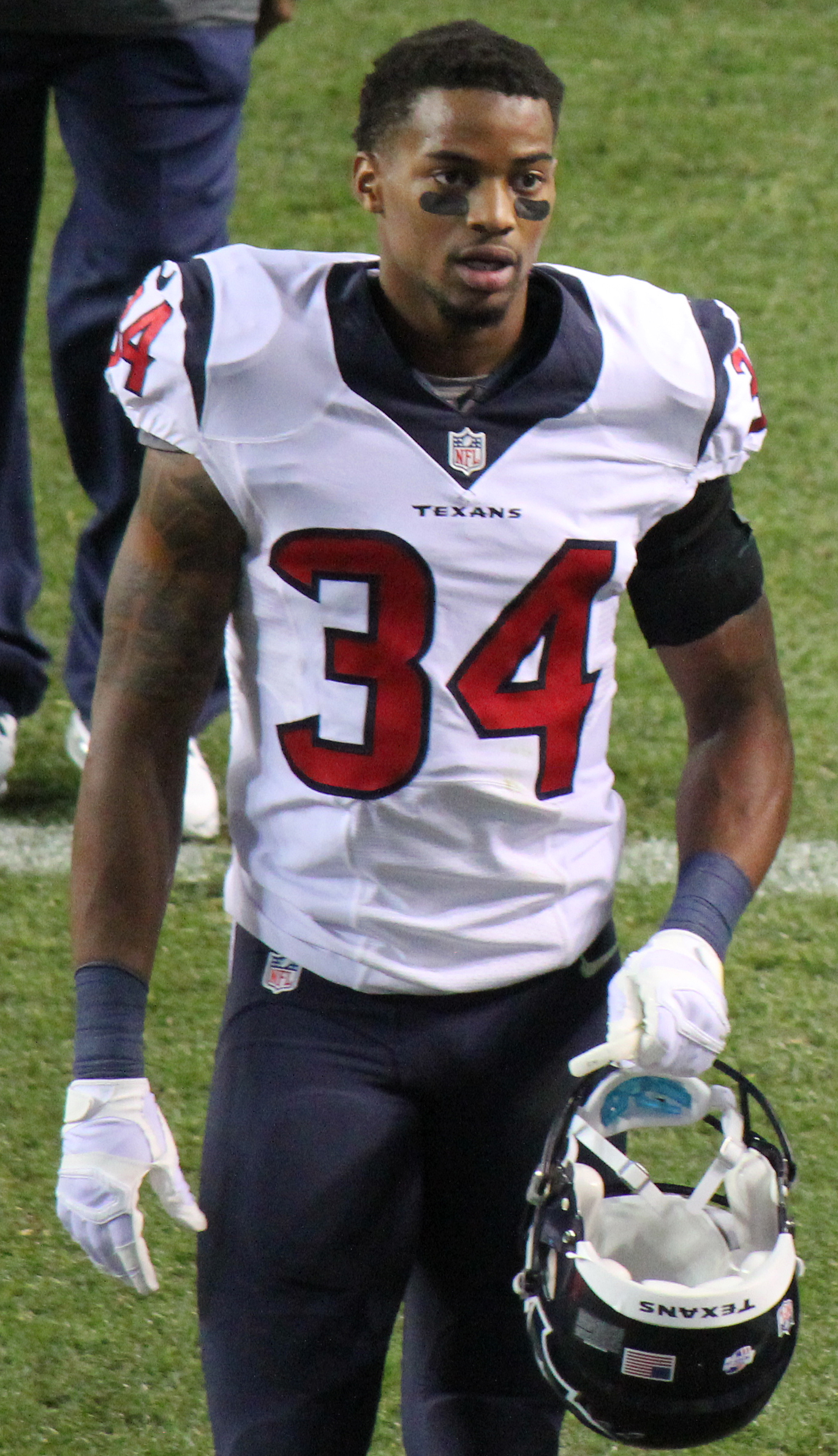
- Bouye with the Houston Texans in 2014

No. 34, 21, 24
- Position: Cornerback

Personal information
- Born: August 16, 1991 (age 35); Tucker, Georgia, U.S.
- Listed height: 6 ft 0 in (1.83 m)
- Listed weight: 191 lb (87 kg)

Career information
- High school: Tucker
- College: UCF (2009–2012)
- NFL draft: 2013: undrafted

Career history
- Houston Texans (2013–2016); Jacksonville Jaguars (2017–2019); Denver Broncos (2020); Carolina Panthers (2021)

Awards and highlights
- Second-team All-Pro (2017); Pro Bowl (2017); Second-team All-C-USA (2012)

Career NFL statistics
- Total tackles: 366
- Sacks: 1.0
- Pass deflections: 75
- Interceptions: 14
- Forced fumbles: 2
- Fumble recoveries: 1
- Defensive touchdowns: 1
- Stats at Pro Football Reference

Arlandus Jacob Bouye (born August 16, 1991) is an American former professional football player who was a cornerback in the National Football League (NFL). He played college football for the UCF Knights and was signed by the Houston Texans as an undrafted free agent in 2013. Bouye also played for the Jacksonville Jaguars, Denver Broncos, and Carolina Panthers.

== Early life ==
Bouye attended and played high school football at Tucker High School.

== College career ==
Bouye played college football at UCF from 2009 to 2012 under head coach George O'Leary. As a freshman, he had 10 total tackles and one pass defended in six games.

Bouye saw an expanded role as a sophomore. In 10 games, he had 26 total tackles, an interception returned for a touchdown (a 42-yarder against Marshall), and eight passes defended.

As a junior, Bouye appeared in seven games and had 21 total tackles, two interceptions, and five passes defensed.

In his final season with the Knights in 2012, Bouye had 53 total tackles, three interceptions, 11 passes defensed, a fumble recovery, and a forced fumble. In that stretch was a 32-yard pick-six and 79-yard fumble recovery touchdown against Memphis and a 76-yard pick-six against Tulsa. After his career with the Knights, Bouye entered the 2013 NFL draft.

== Professional career ==
Pre-draft measurables
Height	Weight	Arm length	Hand span	40-yard dash	10-yard split	20-yard split	20-yard shuttle	Three-cone drill	Vertical jump	Broad jump	Bench press
6 ft 0 1/4 in (1.84 m)	186 lb (84 kg)	31 3/4 in (0.81 m)	9 in (0.23 m)	4.55 s	1.50 s	2.62 s	4.04 s	7.06 s	36.5 in (0.93 m)	10 ft 5 in (3.18 m)	18 reps
All values from UCF's Pro Day

=== Houston Texans ===
==== 2013 season ====
On April 28, 2013, the Houston Texans signed Bouye to a three-year, $1.41 million contract that includes a $5,000 signing bonus after he went undrafted in the 2013 NFL draft.

Throughout organized team activities and training camp, Bouye competed for a roster spot and a job as the fourth cornerback against Brandon Harris, Roc Carmichael, Johnny Adams, and Travis Howard. Head coach Gary Kubiak named Bouye the fifth cornerback on the Texans' depth chart to start the regular season, behind Johnathan Joseph, Kareem Jackson, Brice McCain, and Brandon Harris.

Bouye made his professional regular season debut in the season-opening 31–28 road victory against the San Diego Chargers. Three weeks later, Bouye made his first career tackle on fullback Derrick Coleman during a kick return in the second quarter of a 23–20 loss to the Seattle Seahawks.

On October 16, 2013, Bouye was placed on injured reserve for the rest of the season due to a strained hamstring. He finished his rookie season with two combined tackles in six games and no starts and appeared solely on special teams.

==== 2014 season ====
During training camp, secondary coach John Butler held an open competition for the job as the third cornerback on the depth chart. The competition included Bouye, Brandon Harris, Josh Victorian, Elbert Mack, Andre Hal, and Marcus Williams. New head coach Bill O'Brien named Bouye the third cornerback to start the regular season behind starters Johnathan Joseph and Kareem Jackson.

Bouye earned his first career start and recorded three combined tackles in the Week 3 30–17 road loss to the New York Giants, but left in the third quarter after sustaining a groin injury. The injury sidelined him for the next two games (Weeks 4–5). In Week 9, Bouye recorded seven combined tackles, broke up a pass, and returned his first NFL interception, off a pass by quarterback Mark Sanchez, for a 51-yard touchdown in a 31–21 loss to the Philadelphia Eagles. It also marked Bouye's first career touchdown. Two weeks later, he collected a season-high ten combined tackles (nine solo) and a pass deflection during a 23–7 road victory over the Cleveland Browns. In Week 13, Bouye made three solo tackles, a pass deflection, and returned an interception by Jake Locker for a season-long 67-yard gain during the third quarter of a 45–21 victory over the Tennessee Titans.

Bouye finished his second professional season with 59 combined tackles (52 solo), 10 pass deflections, three interceptions, a touchdown, a forced fumble, and a fumble recovery in 14 games and six starts. His three interceptions tied for the most among the Texans' defense in 2014.

==== 2015 season ====
Throughout training camp, Bouye competed against rookie first round pick Kevin Johnson for the role as the third cornerback on the Texans' depth chart. Defensive coordinator Romeo Crennel opted to name Bouye the fourth cornerback on the depth chart to start the regular season, behind Johnathan Joseph, Kareem Jackson, and Kevin Johnson.

On October 18, 2015, Bouye recorded a season-high seven solo tackles, deflected two passes, and intercepted a pass by quarterback Blake Bortles during a 31–20 road victory over the Jacksonville Jaguars. During Week 11 against the New York Jets, he deflected a pass before leaving the eventual 24–17 victory in the third quarter due to a concussion. Bouye remained in concussion protocol and was inactive for the Week 12 matchup against the New Orleans Saints.

Bouye finished the 2015 season with 16 combined tackles (15 solo), six pass deflections, and two interceptions in 15 games and two starts. The Texans finished atop the AFC South with a 9–7 record and received a Wild Card berth. On January 9, 2016, Bouye appeared in his first career playoff game and recorded a solo tackle in a 30–0 shutout loss to the Kansas City Chiefs during the Wild Card Round.

==== 2016 season ====
On March 8, 2016, the Texans signed Bouye to a one-year, $1.67 million tender with a right of first refusal class after he became a restricted free agent in 2016.

Bouye entered training camp slated as the fourth cornerback on the depth chart and opted to change his jersey number from No. 34 to his college number at Central Florida, No. 21. He stated he originally chose 21 because he was a fan of Deion Sanders growing up. As a rookie, he was unable to receive No. 21 as it belonged to longtime veteran Brice McCain. Head coach Bill O'Brien stated Bouye was one of the most improved players on defense during training camp.

During the season-opener against the Chicago Bears, Bouye recorded three solo tackles, deflected a pass, and his first career sack on quarterback Jay Cutler in the 23–14 victory. Bouye became the Texans' third cornerback on the depth chart after Kevin Johnson broke his foot the previous week and was sidelined for the remainder of the season. On October 24, 2016, Bouye started at nickelback and recorded a season-high 11 combined tackles (nine solo) and two pass deflections in a 27–9 road loss to the Denver Broncos. He was inactive for the Texans' Week 10 matchup against the Jacksonville Jaguars after sustaining an ankle injury in practice two days prior. After an MRI, it was determined that Bouye only sustained a sprained ankle and he returned the following week. In Week 11, Bouye recorded two combined tackles, broke up a pass, and intercepted a pass by Derek Carr during a 27–20 loss to the Oakland Raiders in Mexico.

Bouye had a breakout season in 2016 and finished with a career-high 63 combined tackles (48 solo), 16 pass deflections, an interception, and a sack in 15 games and 11 starts. He earned the third highest grade among all cornerbacks in 2016 from Pro Football Focus. The Texans finished atop the AFC South with a 9–7 record and clinched a playoff berth. On January 7, 2017, Bouye started his first career playoff game and recorded two combined tackles, four pass deflections, and intercepted a pass attempt by Connor Cook during a 27–14 victory over the Oakland Raiders in the Wild Card Round. The following week, Bouye made five solo tackles, deflected two passes, and intercepted a pass by Tom Brady during a 34–16 road loss to the eventual Super Bowl LI Champion New England Patriots in the Divisional Round.

Bouye became an unrestricted free agent after the 2016 season and was one of the most highly sought after free agents on the market. He was pursued by many teams, including the Chicago Bears, Jacksonville Jaguars, Tennessee Titans, San Francisco 49ers, Cleveland Browns, Indianapolis Colts, and Philadelphia Eagles.

=== Jacksonville Jaguars ===
On March 9, 2017, the Jacksonville Jaguars signed Bouye to a five-year, $67.5 million contract with $26 million guaranteed and a signing bonus of $10 million, making him the highest paid undrafted cornerback. Bouye stated he turned down a larger contract offer by the Bears to join the Jaguars.

==== 2017 season ====
Head coach Doug Marrone named Bouye the starting cornerback along with Jalen Ramsey entering training camp. Bouye made his Jaguars regular-season debut in their season-opener against the Houston Texans and recorded six combined tackles and two pass deflections during their 29–7 road victory. On November 12, 2017, Bouye recorded four combined tackles, broke up a pass, and returned an interception 51 yards to set up Josh Lambo's 30-yard field goal to defeat the Los Angeles Chargers in overtime by a score of 20–17. Bouye earned AFC Defensive Player of the Week honors for his performance. Three weeks later, Bouye collected a season-high seven combined tackles during a 30–10 victory over the Indianapolis Colts. The following week, he recorded two combined tackles, a season-high four pass deflections, and intercepted two passes by quarterback Russell Wilson in a 30–24 victory over the Seattle Seahawks. It marked Bouye's first multi-interception game of his career.

On December 19, 2017, Bouye was named to his first Pro Bowl as a starter alongside teammate Ramsey. Bouye finished the season with 56 combined tackles (53 solo), a career-high 18 pass deflections, and a career-high six interceptions in 16 games and starts. Pro Football Focus gave Bouye an overall grade of 88.0, ranking him 12th among all cornerbacks in 2017. He was ranked 35th on the NFL Top 100 Players of 2018.

The Jaguars finished atop the AFC South with a 10–6 record. They defeated the Buffalo Bills 10–3 in the Wild Card Round and defeated the Pittsburgh Steelers 45–42 in the AFC Divisional Round. On January 21, 2018, Bouye recorded six solo tackles during a 24–20 road loss to the Patriots in the AFC Championship.

==== 2018 season ====
In the 2018 season, Bouye started in 13 games and totaled 54 total tackles, an interception, and eight passes defensed as the Jaguars finished with a 5–11 record.

==== 2019 season ====
In Week 8 against the New York Jets, Bouye recorded his first and only interception of the season off Sam Darnold in the 29–15 victory. Bouye played in 14 games and recorded 65 total tackles, an interception, and eight passes defensed in the 2019 season.

=== Denver Broncos ===
On March 3, 2020, the Jaguars agreed to trade Bouye to the Denver Broncos for a 2020 fourth-round pick originally acquired from the San Francisco 49ers. The deal became official on March 18.

Bouye suffered a dislocated shoulder in Week 1 against the Titans and was placed on injured reserve on September 16, 2020. He was activated on October 24. He played in seven games, starting in all of them and recorded six passes defensed and no interceptions for the first time since his rookie season. On December 9, Bouye was suspended by the NFL for the next six games for violating the league's policy on performance-enhancing drugs. He missed the final four games of the season.

Bouye was released on February 10, 2021, to clear cap space for the upcoming free agency period.

=== Carolina Panthers ===
Bouye signed with the Carolina Panthers on April 12, 2021. He entered the 2021 season as a starting cornerback for the Panthers.

Bouye suffered a foot injury in Week 14 and was placed on injured reserve on December 21, 2021. He finished the 2021 season with 28 tackles, three passes defensed, and a forced fumble in 10 games and seven starts.

On March 14, 2022, Bouye was released by the Panthers.

== Career statistics ==
=== NFL ===
Regular season statistics
Year	Team	Games		Tackles				Interceptions						Fumbles	
Year	Team	GP	GS	Comb	Solo	Ast	Sack	PD	Int	Yds	Avg	Lng	TD	FF	FR
2013	HOU	6	0	2	2	0	0.0	0	0	0	0.0	0	0	0	0
2014	HOU	14	6	59	52	7	0.0	10	3	120	40.0	67T	1	0	0
2015	HOU	15	2	16	15	1	0.0	6	2	9	4.5	9	0	1	1
2016	HOU	15	11	63	48	15	1.0	16	1	0	0.0	0	0	0	0
2017	JAX	16	16	56	53	3	0.0	18	6	70	11.7	51	0	0	0
2018	JAX	13	13	54	46	8	0.0	8	1	9	9.0	9	0	0	0
2019	JAX	14	14	65	50	15	0.0	8	1	25	25.0	25	0	0	0
2020	DEN	7	7	23	21	2	0.0	6	0	0	0.0	0	0	0	0
2021	CAR	10	7	28	23	5	0.0	3	0	0	0.0	0	0	1	0
Career		110	76	366	310	56	1.0	75	14	233	16.6	67T	1	2	1

Postseason statistics
Year	Team	Games		Tackles				Interceptions						Fumbles	
Year	Team	GP	GS	Comb	Solo	Ast	Sack	PD	Int	Yds	Avg	Lng	TD	FF	FR
2015	HOU	1	0	1	1	0	0.0	0	0	0	0.0	0	0	0	0
2016	HOU	2	2	7	5	2	0.0	6	2	13	6.5	7	0	1	0
2017	JAX	3	3	16	14	2	0.0	1	0	0	0.0	0	0	0	0
Career		6	5	24	20	4	0.0	7	2	13	6.5	7	0	1	0

=== College ===
Year	School	Conf	Class	Pos	G	Tackles					Interceptions					Fumbles			
Year	School	Conf	Class	Pos	G	Solo	Ast	Tot	Loss	Sk	Int	Yds	Avg	TD	PD	FR	Yds	TD	FF
2009	UCF	CUSA	FR	DB	10	6	4	10	0.0	0.0	0	0	0.0	0	1	0	0	0	0
2010	UCF	CUSA	SO	DB	12	11	15	26	3.0	1.0	1	42	42.0	1	0	0	0	0	0
2011	UCF	CUSA	JR	DB	7	19	2	21	1.5	0.0	2	27	13.5	0	0	0	0	0	0
2012	UCF	CUSA	SR	DB	14	42	11	53	0.5	0.0	3	111	37.0	1	0	1	79	1	0
Career	UCF				43	78	32	110	5.0	1.0	6	180	30.0	2	1	1	79	1	0

== Personal life ==
When Bouye was only three years old, his mother, Jackie Baskin, died from breast and brain cancer. She was diagnosed with breast cancer and died nine months later after the cancer spread to her brain. Jackie left Bouye and his older sister, Erin Baskin-Bradshaw. Bouye was raised by his father, Steve Bouye, who promised his mother to always look after their son while she was on her deathbed. Steve worked as a corrections officer for multiple facilities, including the United States Penitentiary in Atlanta. Bouye is a member of the American Cancer Society's Athlete Council and also participates in the Crucial Catch Challenge.

Bouye is a cousin of Boston Celtics shooting guard Jaylen Brown, who was the third overall pick in the 2016 NBA draft, a 5× NBA All-Star, and the 2024 NBA Finals MVP. Bouye married Laureynn Bouye in February 2022, together they have four children.
