= Myles Jack =

American football player (born 1995)

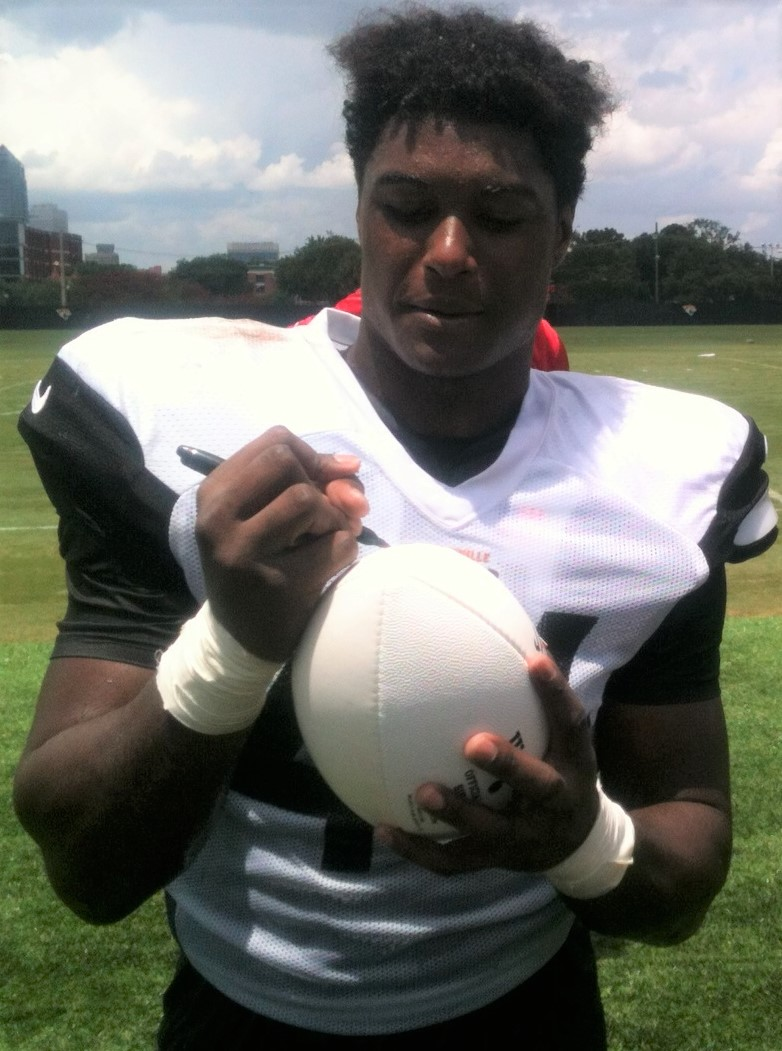
- Jack with the Jacksonville Jaguars in 2016

No. 16, 44, 51
- Position: Linebacker

Personal information
- Born: September 3, 1995 (age 31); Scottsdale, Arizona, U.S.
- Listed height: 6 ft 1 in (1.85 m)
- Listed weight: 255 lb (116 kg)

Career information
- High school: Bellevue (Bellevue, Washington)
- College: UCLA (2013–2015)
- NFL draft: 2016: 2nd round, 36th overall pick

Career history
- Jacksonville Jaguars (2016–2021); Pittsburgh Steelers (2022); Philadelphia Eagles (2023)*; Pittsburgh Steelers (2023)
- * Offseason or practice squad member only

Awards and highlights
- 2× Second-team All-Pac-12 (2013, 2014); Pac-12 Defensive Freshman of the Year (2013); Pac-12 Offensive Freshman of the Year (2013)

Career NFL statistics
- Total tackles: 634
- Sacks: 7.5
- Forced fumbles: 2
- Fumble recoveries: 4
- Interceptions: 3
- Pass deflections: 18
- Defensive touchdowns: 2
- Stats at Pro Football Reference

Myles David Jack (born September 3, 1995) is an American former professional football player who was a linebacker in the National Football League (NFL). He played college football for the UCLA Bruins and was named the top freshman player in the Pac-12, receiving honors both on defense as well as on offense for his work as a running back and was named an All-Pac-12 linebacker twice. In 2015, Jack dropped out of UCLA and declared for the draft after suffering a season-ending knee injury. Jack was selected by the Jacksonville Jaguars in the second round of the 2016 NFL draft. Along with his mother LaSonjia Jack, he is the current owner of the ECHL Allen Americans.

== Early life ==
Jack was born in Scottsdale, Arizona, to La Sonjia and H. David Jack. While in high school, he lettered in football and track at Bellevue High in Bellevue, Washington. In football, Jack played exclusively as a running back through his sophomore year, before also becoming a linebacker. As a senior, he had 98 tackles and 24 sacks, leading his team to a 14–0 record.

On the track team, Jack earned a third-place finish in the 400-meter dash at the 2013 WA 3A State Meet, recording a personal best time of 49.05 seconds. At the 2013 3A KingCo Championships, he took bronze in the 200-meter dash event by clocking a personal-best time of 22.12 seconds. He was also a member of the 2013 state 3A champion 4 × 100 m (41.64) and 4 × 400 m (3:20.12) relay teams.

Considered a four-star recruit by Rivals.com, Jack was listed as the No. 16 outside linebacker in the nation in 2013. He chose UCLA over offers from Florida State, Arizona State, Stanford, Washington, and Utah.

== College career ==
As a true freshman in 2013, Jack played in 13 games, starting 12 at linebacker and one at running back. He finished the season with 75 tackles, the second-most ever by a UCLA true freshman behind Kenny Easley's 93 in 1977. Jack also added two interceptions and one touchdown on defense. As a running back, he had 267 rushing yards on 38 carries, averaging over seven yards per carry, and ran for a team-leading seven touchdowns in five games on offense.

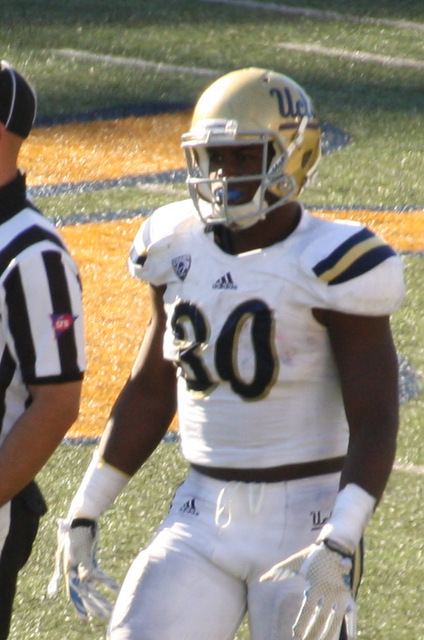
Jack with UCLA in 2014

Jack did not play at running back until the ninth game of the season in a 31–26 win over Arizona, when he gained 120 yards on six carries, including a 66-yard touchdown. The Bruins had been short on running backs with starter Jordon James out with an ankle injury. With more injuries to their backs the following week, Jack ran for a UCLA freshman-record four touchdowns in a 41–31 win over Washington. With the offense still depleted in the backfield and with Coach Jim Mora playing mostly a nickel defense against Arizona State, Jack started and played exclusively at running back against the Sun Devils, carrying 16 times for 86 yards and a touchdown in a 38–33 loss. For his play, Jack was named both the Pac-12 Conference Offensive and Defensive Freshman Player of the Year. He was also named an All-American by Athlon Sports and was a finalist for the Paul Hornung Award. He also earned Freshman All-American honors by The Sporting News in 2013.

In his sophomore year in 2014, he was named to the All-Pac-12 second-team as a linebacker for the second straight year. He also continued to see time as a running back, carrying the ball 28 times in nine games.

On September 22, 2015, during a routine practice, Jack tore the meniscus in his knee while performing a non-contact drill, and a statement was released from coaches stating that he would not return for the remainder of the season. On October 6, head coach Jim Mora announced that Jack had withdrawn from UCLA to focus on his rehabilitilation and entering the 2016 NFL draft. His injury had occurred two days before the start of the fall quarter, and he had already fallen behind in his classes while rehabbing from his knee and coping with his short-term immobility. Entering the 2015 season, Jack was widely considered a first-round draft prospect.

== Professional career ==
=== Pre-draft ===
Jack was one of 39 linebackers to attend the NFL Scouting Combine in Indianapolis, Indiana. He was limited to the bench press due to his knee and finished tied for 13th in the bench press among all participating linebackers. On March 10, 2016, Jack attended UCLA's pro day and performed the vertical jump, broad jump, and positional drills. His vertical jump would have finished eighth among all linebackers at the combine and his broad jump would have finished fourth. Team representatives and scouts from all 32 teams attended to scout Jack and meet with him, including head coach Hue Jackson (Cleveland Browns) and general managers Doug Whaley (Buffalo Bills) and Les Snead (Los Angeles Rams). Throughout the draft process, Jack attended private visits and workouts with multiple NFL teams, including the Jacksonville Jaguars, Miami Dolphins, Chicago Bears, New Orleans Saints, San Francisco 49ers, Atlanta Falcons, and Oakland Raiders.

External videos
- Myles Jack NFL Combine
- Myles Jack UCLA Pro Day workout

On April 14, 2016, he returned to Indianapolis to undergo another physical to check on his knee and evaluate his recovery progress. Prior to the draft, Jack was confident he could play immediately, but admitted that his knee had degenerative aspects which could require microfracture surgery in the future. At the conclusion of the pre-draft process, Jack was projected to be an early first round pick by NFL draft experts and scouts expected him to be a top ten pick. He was ranked the top linebacker prospect in the draft by Sports Illustrated, ESPN, and NFL analysts Charles Davis, Mike Mayock, Lance Zierlein, and Daniel Jeremiah. Jack was also ranked the top overall player in the draft by ESPN, the second best overall player by NFL analysts Daniel Jeremiah and Lance Zierlein, and the third best overall player by NFL analyst Charles Davis.

Pre-draft measurables
Height	Weight	Arm length	Hand span	Wingspan	Vertical jump	Broad jump	Bench press
6 ft 1 in (1.85 m)	245 lb (111 kg)	33 5/8 in (0.85 m)	10 1/4 in (0.26 m)	6 ft 7 5/8 in (2.02 m)	40.0 in (1.02 m)	10 ft 4 in (3.15 m)	19 reps
All values from NFL Combine/UCLA's Pro Day

=== Jacksonville Jaguars ===
==== 2016 ====
The Jacksonville Jaguars selected Jack in the second round (36th overall) of the 2016 NFL draft. The Jaguars traded their second (38th overall) and fifth round (146th overall) picks to the Baltimore Ravens in order to move up two spots to 36th overall and draft Myles Jack. His fall out of the first round was widely attributed to concerns over his knee. Jack was the fifth linebacker selected in 2016.

External videos
- Jacksonville Jaguars select Myles Jack

On May 13, 2016, the Jaguars signed Jack to a four-year, $6.33 million contract with $3.54 million guaranteed and a signing bonus of $2.8 million.

Throughout training camp, Jack competed against veteran Dan Skuta to be the starting strongside linebacker and also took reps at middle linebacker. He learned the middle linebacker position as the Jaguars drafted him with the intentions of him eventually taking over for Paul Posluszny. Head coach Gus Bradley named Jack the backup outside linebacker behind veterans Dan Skuta and Telvin Smith to begin the regular season.

Jack made his professional regular season debut during the season-opening 27–23 loss to the Green Bay Packers. The following week, Jack recorded his first solo tackle on Chargers' running back Melvin Gordon after Gordon caught an 11-yard pass by Philip Rivers. After tackling Gordon again on the following play, Jack finished the 38–14 road loss to the San Diego Chargers with two solo tackles. On October 2, 2016, Jack earned his first career start at strongside linebacker after Dan Skuta was unable to play after suffering a hip injury the previous week. He finished the 30–27 victory over the Indianapolis Colts with four combined tackles and a pass deflection. In Week 12, Jack recorded a season-high five combined tackles and recorded his first career sack with teammate Tyson Alualu on quarterback Tyrod Taylor during the Jaguars' 28–21 loss to the Bills. Head coach Gus Bradley was fired after their Week 15 loss to the Houston Texans due a nine-game losing streak and a 2–12 record. Assistant head coach/offensive line coach Doug Marrone was named interim head coach for the last two games of the season. Jack finished his rookie season in 2016 with 24 combined tackles (18 solo), two pass deflections, and was credited with half a sack in 16 games and ten starts.

==== 2017 ====
On January 9, 2017, interim head coach Doug Marrone was elevated to full-time head coach and opted to retain Todd Wash as the Jaguars' defensive coordinator. On April 18, it was announced by the Jaguars' coaching staff that Jack would enter organized team activities as the starting middle linebacker and Paul Posluszny would take over the starting strongside linebacker role previously held by Jack and the recently departed Dan Skuta. Throughout training camp, Jack made the transition to middle linebacker with the assistance of teammate Paul Posluszny. Jack reverted to his strongside linebacker position after he struggled to adjust to his new role and had difficulty performing the required duties during the Jaguars' first preseason game against the New England Patriots. Head coach Doug Marrone named Jack the starting strongside linebacker, Telvin Smith the starting weakside linebacker, and Paul Posluszny the starting middle linebacker to start the regular season.

Jack started the Jaguars' season-opener at the Texans and recorded a season-high 14 combined tackles (eight solo) during their 29–7 victory. The following game, he made six combined tackles and had his first career solo sack on Titans' quarterback Marcus Mariota in the 37–16 loss to the Tennessee Titans. In Week 7, he collected eight combined tackles, broke up a pass, and sacked Jacoby Brissett as the Jaguars routed the Colts 27–0.

Jack finished his second professional season with 90 combined tackles (66 solo), three pass deflections, and two sacks in 16 games and 16 starts. His 90 tackles finished second on the team, behind only Telvin Smith, who had 102 combined tackles. The Jaguars finished atop the AFC r first season under head coach Doug Marrone. On January 7, 2018, Jack started his first career playoff game and recorded six combined tackles, two pass deflections, and a sack in a 10–3 victory over the Bills during the Wild Card Round. The following week, he made six combined tackles, deflected a pass, and an interception during a 45–42 road victory over the Pittsburgh Steelers in the Divisional Round. On January 21, 2018, he collected seven combined tackles during the Jaguars' 24–20 loss at the Patriots in the AFC Championship Game. He was a part of a controversial play in the fourth quarter that occurred after forcing a fumble by Patriots' running back Dion Lewis and recovered it. Jack was returning it for a defensive touchdown that would have put the Jaguars up 26–10 against the Patriots, but had the play blown dead by the referees who had seen Jack was down after recovering the fumble.

==== 2018 ====
In the Jaguars' 2018 season opener against the New York Giants, Jack recorded a 32-yard pick six off of Eli Manning in the 20–15 victory. In the 2018 season, Jack started all 16 games and recorded 2.5 sacks, 107 total tackles, four quarterback hits, one interception, one pass defensed, one forced fumble, and one fumble recovery.

==== 2019 ====
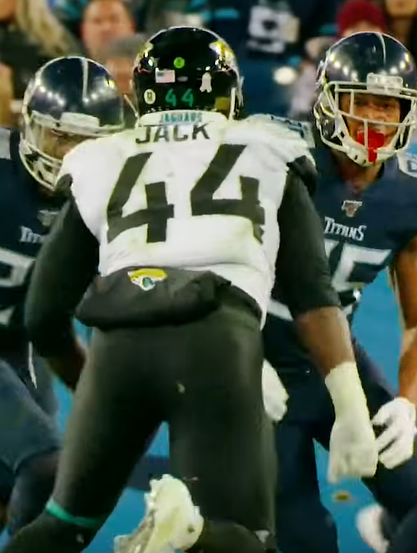
Jack in a game against the Tennessee Titans

On August 31, 2019, Jack signed a four-year, $57 million contract extension with $33 million guaranteed. During Week 1 against the Kansas City Chiefs, Jack was disqualified for throwing a punch at Demarcus Robinson. He was placed on injured reserve on December 5, 2019, with a knee injury. He finished the season with 66 tackles, four passes defensed, 0.5 sacks, and an interception through 11 games and 11 starts.

==== 2020 ====
In Week 1 against the Colts, Jack recorded 11 tackles and his first sack of the season on Philip Rivers during the 27–20 win. He finished the 2020 season with one sack, 118 total tackles, one interception, five passes defended, and one forced fumble.

==== 2021 ====
In the 2021 season, Jack appeared in and started 15 games. He finished with 108 total tackles. On March 15, 2022, Jack was released by the Jaguars. He was the last of the Sacksonville Defense left on the Jacksonville Jaguars.

=== Pittsburgh Steelers (first stint) ===
On March 17, 2022, Jack signed a two-year contract with the Steelers. In the 2022 season, Jack appeared in 15 games and started in 13. He finished with 104 total tackles and three passes defended.

On March 16, 2023, Jack was released by the Steelers.

He revealed in a later interview that he considered going to trade school in order to pursue a career as an electrician or a plumber during the 2023 offseason.

=== Philadelphia Eagles ===
On August 6, 2023, Jack signed with the Philadelphia Eagles.

On August 20, 2023, Jack announced his retirement from professional football.

=== Pittsburgh Steelers (second stint) ===
On November 20, 2023, it was announced that Jack was coming out of retirement with the Steelers signing him to their practice squad the same day. On December 22, Jack was elevated to the active roster. He played in his first game on the following day against the Cincinnati Bengals. He recorded six tackles and one sack against the Bengals in a 34–11 Steelers win.

== Personal life ==
Jack is a cousin of NFL running backs Samaje Perine and La'Mical Perine.

On October 4, 2023, it was announced that the Allen Americans was sold to Myles Jack and his mother LaSonjia Jack, becoming the first ever African-American majority owners in ECHL history.

Jack is a minority shareholder in the Premier League soccer club Leeds United.

Jack was arrested on December 17, 2025, in Frisco, Texas, and is facing a felony charge of deadly conduct for discharge of a firearm during a welfare check.
