= Telvin Smith =

American football player (born 1991)

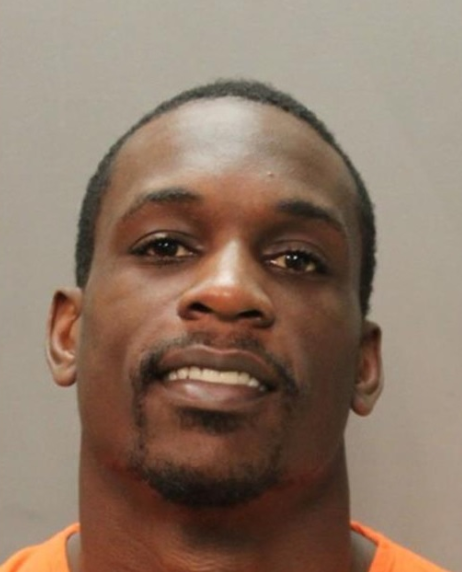

No. 50
- Position: Linebacker

Personal information
- Born: April 11, 1991 (age 35); Valdosta, Georgia, U.S.
- Listed height: 6 ft 3 in (1.91 m)
- Listed weight: 215 lb (98 kg)

Career information
- High school: Lowndes (Valdosta)
- College: Florida State (2010–2013)
- NFL draft: 2014: 5th round, 144th overall pick

Career history
- Jacksonville Jaguars (2014–2018)

Awards and highlights
- Second-team All-Pro (2017); Pro Bowl (2017); BCS national champion (2013); Second-team All-ACC (2013)

Career NFL statistics
- Total tackles: 587
- Sacks: 7.5
- Forced fumbles: 5
- Fumble recoveries: 6
- Interceptions: 9
- Pass deflections: 26
- Defensive touchdowns: 4
- Stats at Pro Football Reference

Telvin Trishaun Smith Sr. (born April 11, 1991) is an American former professional football player who was a linebacker for the Jacksonville Jaguars of the National Football League (NFL). He played college football for the Florida State Seminoles and was selected by the Jaguars in the fifth round of the 2014 NFL draft. Smith played his entire professional career with the Jaguars, earning second-team All-Pro honors and a Pro Bowl selection in 2017. He retired after the 2018 season.

== Early life ==
Smith attended Lowndes High School in Valdosta, Georgia, where he played football and ran track. In football, he registered 84 tackles and two interceptions as a senior for the Vikings. As a junior, he recorded 97 tackles, including 16 for loss and two interceptions, helping his team win the state AAAAA championship.

In track & field, Smith competed in sprints and relays for the Vikings in 2009. At the Region 1AAAAA Meet, he placed 5th in the 400-meter dash event, recording a personal-best time of 51.00 seconds, and ran a leg on the Lowndes 4 × 100 m (42.50 seconds) and 4 × 400 m (3:25.05 minutes) relay squads.

Considered a four-star recruit by Rivals.com, he was rated as the 18th best outside linebacker prospect in the nation.

== College career ==
Smith attended Florida State University from 2010 to 2013. As a true freshman in 2010, he played in all 14 games, recording 18 tackles and 1.5 sacks. As a sophomore, he played in 12 games with one start. He had 42 tackles with three sacks and one interception. As a junior in 2012, he played in all 14 games, recording 64 tackles and one sack. After three years as a backup, he took over as a starter in 2013. He led the Seminole's defense with 75 tackles, 9.5 tackles for losses, and three interceptions, two that he returned for touchdown. He was named first-team All-Atlantic Coast Conference (ACC).

== Professional career ==
=== Pre-draft ===
On January 21, 2014, it was announced that Smith would play in the 2014 Senior Bowl as part of Jacksonville Jaguars head coach Gus Bradley's South team. On January 25, 2014, Smith made five combined tackles and had a tackle for a loss with South teammate Deandre Coleman as the South defeated the North 20–10. Smith went on to attend the NFL Scouting Combine in Indianapolis, Indiana and was one of 35 collegiate linebackers performing. He performed the majority of combine drills, but opted to skip the bench press, short shuttle, and three-cone drill. Smith finished second among all participating linebackers in the 40-yard dash and tied for 12th in the broad jump. On March 18, 2014, he attended Florida State's pro day and performed the short shuttle, three-cone drill, and positional drills for scouts and team representatives from all 32 NFL teams, including head coaches Mike Tomlin (Pittsburgh Steelers), Chip Kelly (Philadelphia Eagles), Jim Caldwell (Detroit Lions), and Mike Zimmer (Minnesota Vikings).

External videos
- Telvin Smith NFL Combine workout

Pre-draft measurables
Height	Weight	Arm length	Hand span	40-yard dash	10-yard split	20-yard split	20-yard shuttle	Three-cone drill	Vertical jump	Broad jump	Bench press
6 ft 3 in (1.91 m)	218 lb (99 kg)	32 1/2 in (0.83 m)	10 1/4 in (0.26 m)	4.52 s	1.57 s	2.63 s	4.57 s	7.04 s	31.5 in (0.80 m)	9 ft 11 in (3.02 m)	16 reps
All values from NFL Combine/Pro Day

=== 2014 ===
The Jaguars selected Smith in the fifth round (144th overall) of the 2014 NFL draft. He was the 17th linebacker selected in 2014.

On May 27, 2014, the Jaguars signed Smith to a four-year, $2.43 million contract that includes a signing bonus of $211,052.

Throughout training camp, Smith competed against Geno Hayes, LaRoy Reynolds, and Dekoda Watson for a job as one of the starting outside linebackers. He became the frontrunner for the starting weakside linebacker job after Watson started camp on the physically unable to perform list (PUP) due to a sports hernia injury. Bradley named Smith the backup outside linebacker behind starters Hayes and Reynolds to start the regular season.

External videos
- Week 7: Telvin Smith Highlights

He made his professional regular season debut in the Jaguars' season-opener at the Philadelphia Eagles and recorded three combined tackles during a 34–17 loss. The following week, Smith recorded five combined tackles and made his first career sack on quarterback Kirk Cousins as the Jaguars were routed at the Washington Redskins 41–10. On October 19, 2014, Smith collected four combined tackles, broke up two passes, and returned his first career interception off Brian Hoyer for 15-yards in a 24–6 victory against the Cleveland Browns. As a result, he earned his first American Football Conference (AFC) Defensive Player of the Week honors. The following week, Smith earned his first career start and collected five combined tackles and a pass deflection during a 27–13 loss to the Miami Dolphins in Week 8. In Week 12, Smith recorded 13 combined tackles during the Jaguars' 23–3 loss at the Indianapolis Colts. It marked Smith's first career game with double digit tackles on defense. On December 28, 2014, he made a season-high 16 combined tackles during a 23–17 loss at the Houston Texans. He finished his rookie season in 2014 with a total of 104 combined tackles (72 solo), four pass deflections, two sacks, a forced fumble, and an interception in 16 games and nine starts. He played 705 defensive snaps on defense, ranking second among Jaguars' linebackers behind only J. T. Thomas (714 snaps).

=== 2015 ===
Smith entered the 2015 regular season as the starting weakside linebacker along with Dan Skuta and starting middle linebacker Paul Posluszny.

On October 11, 2015, Smith recorded a season-high 14 combined tackles during a 38–31 loss to the Tampa Bay Buccaneers. In Week 7, he made two combined tackles, a season-high three pass deflections, and returned an interception off a pass by former FSU teammate E. J. Manuel for a 26-yard touchdown during a 34–31 victory against the Buffalo Bills. His performance against the Bills earned him AFC Defensive Player of the Week honors and marked his first career touchdown. In Week 10, Smith made 12 combined tackles in the Jaguars' 22–20 victory at the Baltimore Ravens. On December 20, 2015, he recorded six solo tackles during a 23–17 loss to the Atlanta Falcons. He left in the third quarter after sustaining a separated shoulder and dislocated finger that sidelined him for the last two games of the season (Weeks 16-17). Smith finished the 2016 season with a career-high 128 combined tackles (99 solo), seven pass deflections, 2.5 sacks, and an interception in 14 games and 14 starts. He was ranked 83rd on the NFL Top 100 Players of 2016.

=== 2016 ===
Bradley named Smith the starting weakside linebacker along with Dan Skuta and starting middle linebacker Paul Posluszny to begin the regular season.

External videos
- NFL Top 100 Players: Telvin Smith

In Week 8, Smith recorded 15 combined tackles (ten solo) during a 36–22 loss at the Tennessee Titans. On December 4, 2016, Smith made six solo tackles and sacked quarterback Trevor Siemian as the Jaguars lost 20–10 to the Denver Broncos. On December 18, 2016, he collected eight combined tackles, a pass deflection, and intercepted a pass by Brock Osweiler in the Jaguars' 21–20 loss at the Texans. Following their loss to the Texans, Bradley was fired and assistant head coach/offensive line coach Doug Marrone was promoted to interim head coach. Smith finished the 2016 season with 118 combined tackles (98 solo), eight pass deflections, two interceptions, and a sack in 16 games and 16 starts.

=== 2017 ===
Smith, Posluszny, and Myles Jack all remained the starting linebackers entering the regular season.

On September 17, 2017, Smith intercepted quarterback Marcus Mariota to stop a drive that was in Jaguars' territory in a 37–16 loss to the Titans. In Week 5, Smith recorded ten combined tackles, broke up a pass, and returned an interception by quarterback Ben Roethlisberger for a 28-yard touchdown in the Jaguars' 30–9 victory at the Pittsburgh Steelers. His performance in Week 5 earned him AFC Defensive Player of the Week.

External videos
- Smith recovers fumble and returns it for 50-yards
- Telvin Smith intercepts Marcus Mariota
- Telvin Smith takes interception to be house for six

On October 25, 2017, the Jaguars signed Smith to a four-year, $45.05 million contract extension that includes $15.05 million guaranteed and a signing bonus of $4.05 million. On December 3, 2017, Smith recorded seven combined tackles during a 27–24 loss at the Arizona Cardinals, but left in the third quarter after sustaining a concussion. He missed the following two weeks (Weeks 13-14) while he remained in concussion protocol. Smith finished the season with 102 combined tackles (76 solo), five pass deflections, three interceptions, one touchdown, and one sack in 14 games and 14 starts. On January 22, 2018, it was announced that Smith would play in the 2018 Pro Bowl as a late replacement for Jadeveon Clowney. He was ranked 67th by his peers on the NFL Top 100 Players of 2018.

External videos
- Telvin Smith gets through blocks extra point
- Telvin Smith takes off for 50-yard scoop and score

The Jaguars finished first in the AFC South with a 10–6 record and earned a playoff berth. On January 7, 2018, Smith recorded nine combined tackles during a 10–3 win against the Bills in the AFC Wildcard Game. The following week, he made 16 combined tackles (14 solo), deflected a pass, and returned a fumble recovery by Ben Roethlisberger for a 50-yard touchdown during the second quarter of their 45–42 victory at the Steelers in the AFC Divisional Round. On January 21, 2018, Smith recorded eight solo tackles and two pass deflections as the Jaguars lost the AFC Championship Game 24–20 at the New England Patriots.

=== 2018 ===
External videos
- Top 100 Players of 2018: Telvin Smith

Head coach Doug Marrone retained Smith as the starting weakside linebacker in 2018. He started alongside Leon Jacobs and middle linebacker Myles Jack. In Week 5, Smith collected a season-high 13 combined tackles (seven solo) during a 30–14 loss at the Kansas City Chiefs. On December 23, 2018, Smith recorded six combined tackles, deflected a pass, and returned an interception for the third touchdown of his career during a 17–7 win at the Dolphins in Week 16. Smith intercepted a pass by Dolphins’ quarterback Ryan Tannehill, that was initially intended for running back Kalen Ballage, and returned it for a 33-yard touchdown during the fourth quarter. He started in all 16 games in 2018 and recorded a career-high 134 combined tackles (100 solo), two pass deflections, two interceptions, one sack, one forced fumble, and a touchdown.

On May 9, 2019, Smith announced via Instagram that he would not be playing football in the 2019 season, citing the need to "get his world in order". He was placed on the team's reserve/retired list on July 24.

=== NFL statistics ===
==== Regular season ====
Year	Team	Games		Tackles				Interceptions						Fumbles			
Year	Team	GP	GS	Comb	Total	Ast	Sack	PD	INT	Yds	Avg	Lng	TD	FF	FR	Yds	TD
2014	JAX	16	9	104	72	32	2.0	4	1	15	15.0	15	0	1	2	0	0
2015	JAX	14	14	128	99	29	2.5	7	1	26	26.0	26	1	2	0	0	0
2016	JAX	16	16	118	98	20	1.0	8	2	0	0.0	0	0	0	1	0	0
2017	JAX	14	14	102	76	26	1.0	5	3	56	18.7	28	1	1	2	52	1
2018	JAX	16	16	134	100	34	1.0	2	2	33	16.5	33	1	1	1	5	0
Career		76	69	586	445	141	7.5	26	9	130	14.4	33	3	5	6	57	1

==== Postseason ====
Year	Team	Games		Tackles				Interceptions						Fumbles			
Year	Team	GP	GS	Comb	Total	Ast	Sack	PD	INT	Yds	Avg	Lng	TD	FF	FR	Yds	TD
2017	JAX	3	3	35	31	4	0.0	3	0	0	0	0.0	0	1	1	50	1
Totals		3	3	35	31	4	0.0	3	0	0	0	0.0	0	1	1	50	1

== Personal life ==
Police were called to Smith's home on November 27, 2019, to execute a search warrant. On April 29, 2020, Smith was arrested on charges of unlawful sexual contact with a minor in Jacksonville, Florida. He pleaded not guilty. On May 21, 2021, Smith pleaded no contest for his unlawful sexual activity. He received three years of probation, and was ordered to undergo psychosexual counseling. In addition, he was prohibited from contacting any women younger than 18 years of age who were not in his family unless evaluators or counselors approved it.
