= Abry Jones =

American football player (born 1991)

No. 91, 95
- Position: Defensive tackle

Personal information
- Born: September 8, 1991 (age 35); Warner Robins, Georgia, U.S.
- Listed height: 6 ft 4 in (1.93 m)
- Listed weight: 318 lb (144 kg)

Career information
- High school: Northside (Warner Robins)
- College: Georgia
- NFL draft: 2013: undrafted

Career history
- Jacksonville Jaguars (2013–2020); Tennessee Titans (2021)*
- * Offseason or practice squad member only

Career NFL statistics
- Total tackles: 196
- Sacks: 9.5
- Forced fumbles: 3
- Fumble recoveries: 3
- Pass deflections: 12
- Stats at Pro Football Reference

Abry Jones (born September 8, 1991) is an American former professional football player who was a defensive tackle for eight seasons in National Football League (NFL). He was signed as an undrafted free agent by the Jacksonville Jaguars in 2013 and played his entire career with the team. He played college football for the Georgia Bulldogs.

== Professional career ==
Pre-draft measurables
Height	Weight	Arm length	Hand span	40-yard dash	10-yard split	20-yard split	20-yard shuttle	Three-cone drill	Vertical jump	Broad jump	Bench press
6 ft 3 3/8 in (1.91 m)	313 lb (142 kg)	35 in (0.89 m)	9 3/4 in (0.25 m)	5.15 s	1.82 s	3.00 s	4.94 s	7.83 s	26.5 in (0.67 m)	8 ft 5 in (2.57 m)	30 reps
All values from NFL Combine/Pro Day

=== Jacksonville Jaguars ===
Following the 2013 NFL draft, Jones was signed by the Jacksonville Jaguars as an undrafted free agent. He made the team's 53-man roster on August 30, 2013. Jones made his NFL debut on October 6, 2013, against the St. Louis Rams. On October 20, 2013, Jones made his first career tackle against the San Diego Chargers. On December 22, 2013, Jones recorded his first career sack and a season high four tackles against the Tennessee Titans.

On October 5, 2014, Jones recorded a career-high two sacks including his first career forced fumble against the Pittsburgh Steelers. On December 18, 2014, Jones made his first career start and recorded a career high five tackles against the Tennessee Titans. In the 2014 season at the time, Jones recorded a career-best 39 tackles, three sacks, four tackles for loss, and one forced fumble.

On October 4, 2015, Jones recorded his first career fumble recovery against the Indianapolis Colts. On January 1, 2016, Jones was placed on injured reserve.

On February 15, 2017, Jones signed a four-year, $16 million contract extension with the Jaguars. On September 10, 2017, in the season opener against the Houston Texans, Jones's teammate Yannick Ngakoue forced a fumble off of quarterback Tom Savage. The fumble was recovered by Jones and set the Jaguars' offense up for a touchdown scoring drive.

On October 22, 2020, Jones was placed on injured reserve with an ankle injury. He was designated to return from injured reserve on November 25, and began practicing with the team again, but the team did not activate him before his practice period expired on December 16.

=== Tennessee Titans ===
On June 3, 2021, Jones signed with the Tennessee Titans. He announced his retirement from the NFL on July 24.

== Personal life ==
Jones' cousin Javontae Jean-Baptiste was selected by the Washington Commanders in the 7th round of the 2024 NFL draft.

== NFL career statistics ==
Legend
**Bold**	Career high

=== Regular season ===
Year	Team	Games		Tackles					Interceptions					Fumbles			
Year	Team	GP	GS	Cmb	Solo	Ast	Sck	TFL	Int	Yds	TD	Lng	PD	FF	FR	Yds	TD
2013	JAX	8	0	9	8	1	0.5	0	0	0	0	0	0	0	0	0	0
2014	JAX	**16**	2	**39**	23	**16**	**3.0**	4	0	0	0	0	1	**1**	0	0	0
2015	JAX	15	0	17	8	9	2.0	3	0	0	0	0	2	**1**	**1**	0	0
2016	JAX	15	9	32	**26**	6	0.0	4	0	0	0	0	1	0	0	0	0
2017	JAX	15	**15**	31	24	7	1.0	1	0	0	0	0	**6**	**1**	**1**	0	0
2018	JAX	15	6	29	21	8	1.0	**5**	0	0	0	0	2	0	0	0	0
2019	JAX	**16**	**15**	31	15	**16**	2.0	1	0	0	0	0	0	0	**1**	0	0
2020	JAX	5	5	8	4	4	0.0	0	0	0	0	0	0	0	0	0	0
Career		105	52	196	129	67	9.5	18	0	0	0	0	12	3	3	0	0

=== Playoffs ===
Year	Team	Games		Tackles					Interceptions					Fumbles			
Year	Team	GP	GS	Cmb	Solo	Ast	Sck	TFL	Int	Yds	TD	Lng	PD	FF	FR	Yds	TD
2017	JAX	**3**	**2**	**7**	**6**	**1**	0.0	**1**	0	0	0	0	**1**	0	0	0	0
Career		3	2	7	6	1	0.0	1	0	0	0	0	1	0	0	0	0
