= 2017 All-Pro Team =

Official list of the best NFL players in 2017

The 2017 All-Pro teams were named by the Associated Press (AP), Pro Football Writers of America (PFWA), and Sporting News (SN) for performance in the 2017 NFL season. While none of the All-Pro teams have the official imprimatur of the NFL (whose official recognition is nomination to the 2018 Pro Bowl), they are included in the NFL Record and Fact Book and also part of the language of the 2011 NFLPA Collective Bargaining Agreement. Any player selected to the first-team of any of the teams can be described as an "All-Pro." The AP team, with first-team and second-team selections, was chosen by a national panel of fifty NFL writers and broadcasters. The Sporting News All-NFL team is voted on by NFL players and executives and will be released at a later date. The PFWA team is selected by its more than 300 national members who are accredited media members covering the NFL.

== Teams ==
Offense
| Position | First team | Second team |
|---|---|---|
| Quarterback | Tom Brady, New England (AP, PFWA, SN) | Carson Wentz, Philadelphia (AP-2) |
| Running back | Todd Gurley, Los Angeles Rams (AP, PFWA, SN); Le'Veon Bell, Pittsburgh (PFWA, SN) | Le'Veon Bell, Pittsburgh (AP-2) |
| Flex | Le'Veon Bell, Pittsburgh (AP) | Alvin Kamara, New Orleans (AP-2) |
| Tight end | Rob Gronkowski, New England (AP, PFWA); Travis Kelce, Kansas City (SN) | Travis Kelce, Kansas City (AP-2) |
| Wide receiver | Antonio Brown, Pittsburgh (AP, PFWA, SN); DeAndre Hopkins, Houston (AP, PFWA); Julio Jones, Atlanta (SN) | Julio Jones, Atlanta (AP-2); Adam Thielen, Minnesota (AP-2) |
| Left tackle | Andrew Whitworth, Los Angeles Rams (AP) | David Bakhtiari, Green Bay (AP-2) |
| Left guard | Andrew Norwell, Carolina (AP) | Rodger Saffold, Los Angeles Rams (AP-2) |
| Center | Jason Kelce, Philadelphia (AP, PFWA); Alex Mack, Atlanta (SN) | Alex Mack, Atlanta (AP-2) |
| Right guard | David DeCastro, Pittsburgh (AP) | Zack Martin, Dallas (AP-2) |
| Right tackle | Lane Johnson, Philadelphia (AP) | Mitchell Schwartz, Kansas City (AP-2t); Daryl Williams, Carolina (AP-2t) |
| Guard | David DeCastro, Pittsburgh (PFWA, SN); Zack Martin, Dallas (PFWA, SN) | |
| Tackle | Lane Johnson, Philadelphia (PFWA); Andrew Whitworth, Los Angeles Rams (PFWA); Taylor Lewan, Tennessee Titans (SN); Trent Williams, Washington Redskins (SN) | |

Special teams
| Position | First team | Second team |
|---|---|---|
| Kicker | Greg Zuerlein, Los Angeles Rams (AP, PFWA, SN) | Justin Tucker, Baltimore (AP-2) |
| Punter | Johnny Hekker, Los Angeles Rams (AP, PFWA); Brett Kern, Tennessee (SN) | Brett Kern, Tennessee (AP-2) |
| Kick returner | Pharoh Cooper, Los Angeles Rams (AP, PFWA, SN) | Tyler Lockett, Seattle (AP-2) |
| Punt returner | Jamal Agnew, Detroit (AP, PFWA, SN) | Pharoh Cooper, Los Angeles Rams (AP-2) |
| Special teams | Budda Baker, Arizona (AP, PFWA) | Matthew Slater, New England (AP-2) |

Defense
| Position | First team | Second team |
|---|---|---|
| Edge rusher | Calais Campbell, Jacksonville (AP, PFWA); Cameron Jordan, New Orleans (AP, PFWA, SN); Everson Griffen, Minnesota (SN) | Everson Griffen, Minnesota (AP-2); Demarcus Lawrence, Dallas (AP-2) |
| Interior lineman | Cameron Heyward, Pittsburgh (AP); Aaron Donald, Los Angeles Rams (AP, PFWA, SN); Fletcher Cox, Philadelphia (PFWA, SN) | Fletcher Cox, Philadelphia (AP-2); Calais Campbell, Jacksonville (AP-2) |
| Linebacker | Chandler Jones, Arizona (AP, PFWA, SN); Luke Kuechly, Carolina (AP, SN); Bobby Wagner, Seattle (AP, PFWA, SN); Von Miller, Denver (PFWA) | Von Miller, Denver (AP-2); C.J. Mosley, Baltimore (AP-2); Telvin Smith, Jacksonville (AP-2) |
| Cornerback | Jalen Ramsey, Jacksonville (AP, PFWA, SN); Xavier Rhodes, Minnesota (AP, PFWA, SN) | A. J. Bouye, Jacksonville (AP-2); Casey Hayward, Los Angeles Chargers (AP-2) |
| Safety | Kevin Byard, Tennessee (AP, PFWA); Harrison Smith, Minnesota (AP, PFWA, SN); Earl Thomas, Seattle (SN) | Micah Hyde, Buffalo (AP-2); Earl Thomas, Seattle (AP-2) |
| Defensive back | Darius Slay, Detroit (AP) | Xavier Rhodes, Minnesota (AP-2) |

== Key ==
- AP = Associated Press first-team All-Pro
- AP-2 = Associated Press second-team All-Pro
- AP-2t = Tied for second-team All-Pro in the AP vote
- PFWA = Pro Football Writers Association All-NFL
- SN = Sporting News All-Pro

== Position differences ==
PFWA did not separate the tackles and guards into more specific positions as the AP did.
