= Corey Grant (running back) =

American football player (born 1991)

No. 33, 30
- Position: Running back

Personal information
- Born: December 19, 1991 (age 34); Opelika, Alabama, U.S.
- Listed height: 5 ft 11 in (1.80 m)
- Listed weight: 203 lb (92 kg)

Career information
- High school: Opelika
- College: Auburn
- NFL draft: 2015: undrafted

Career history
- Jacksonville Jaguars (2015–2018); Green Bay Packers (2019)*
- * Offseason or practice squad member only

Career NFL statistics
- Rushing yards: 454
- Rushing average: 5.6
- Receptions: 18
- Receiving yards: 156
- Return yards: 973
- Total touchdowns: 4
- Stats at Pro Football Reference

Corey Grant (born December 19, 1991) is an American former professional football player who was a running back in the National Football League (NFL). He played college football for the Auburn Tigers. He signed with the Jacksonville Jaguars as an undrafted free agent in 2015.

== Early life ==
Grant attended Opelika High School, where he played high school football. He was ranked a four-star prospect by Rivals.com and Scout.com. Grant was rated as the fifth best all-purpose running back by Rivals.com.

== College career ==
Grant originally signed with and attended the University of Alabama, where he redshirted for the 2010 season. He transferred to Auburn University in 2011, having to sit out the 2011 season per NCAA transfer rules. Grant later attended and played at Auburn through the 2014 season. In the 2012 season, he had a limited role with nine carries for 29 yards. In the 2013 season opener against Washington State, he had 146 rushing yards and a rushing touchdown. On November 9, against Tennessee, he had a 90-yard kick return for a touchdown. Overall, he finished the 2013 season with 647 rushing yards and six touchdowns. In the 2014 season, he finished with 60 carries for 364 rushing yards and three rushing touchdowns to go along with 10 receptions for 92 yards and a receiving touchdown.

=== College statistics ===
Year	School	Conf	Class	Pos	G	Rushing				Receiving			
Year	School	Conf	Class	Pos	G	Att	Yds	Avg	TD	Rec	Yds	Avg	TD
2012	Auburn	SEC	SO	RB	5	9	29	3.2	0	0	0	0.0	0
2013	Auburn	SEC	JR	RB	14	66	647	9.8	6	4	8	2.0	0
2014	Auburn	SEC	SR	RB	13	60	364	6.1	3	10	92	9.2	1
Career					32	135	1,040	7.7	9	14	100	7.1	1

== Professional career ==
Pre-draft measurables
Height	Weight	Arm length	Hand span	40-yard dash	10-yard split	20-yard split	20-yard shuttle	Three-cone drill	Vertical jump	Broad jump	Bench press
5 ft 8 7/8 in (1.75 m)	201 lb (91 kg)	30 7/8 in (0.78 m)	8 1/4 in (0.21 m)	4.28 s	1.57 s	2.52 s	4.08 s	7.00 s	37.0 in (0.94 m)	10 ft 7 in (3.23 m)	22 reps
All values from Pro Day

=== Jacksonville Jaguars ===
On May 2, 2015, Grant signed with the Jacksonville Jaguars following the conclusion of the 2015 NFL draft as an undrafted free agent. In his rookie season, Grant ran for 2 yards on 6 carries, and had 2 receptions for 13 yards before being placed on injured reserve on October 20, 2015, after suffering a hip injury.

On September 18, 2016, Grant caught his first career touchdown against the San Diego Chargers. On January 1, 2017, Grant ran for 122 yards and a touchdown including a 57-yard touchdown run against the Indianapolis Colts. He finished his 2016 campaign running for 164 yards and a touchdown, as well as four catches for 35 yards and a touchdown.

On August 10, 2017, Grant ran for 120 yards and a touchdown including a 79-yard touchdown run in the preseason opener against the New England Patriots. Overall, he finished the 2017 season with 30 carries for 248 yards and two touchdowns.

On March 12, 2018, the Jaguars placed a second-round restricted free agent tender on Grant. On March 22, 2018, Grant signed his tender to remain with the Jaguars. He was placed on injured reserve on October 9, 2018, after suffering a Lisfranc injury in Week 5, ending his season. He finished the 2018 season with 40 rushing yards on 13 carries and nine receptions for 67 receiving yards.

=== Green Bay Packers ===
On July 26, 2019, Grant signed with the Green Bay Packers. He was released on August 8, 2019.
