= Josh Lambo =

American football player (born 1990)

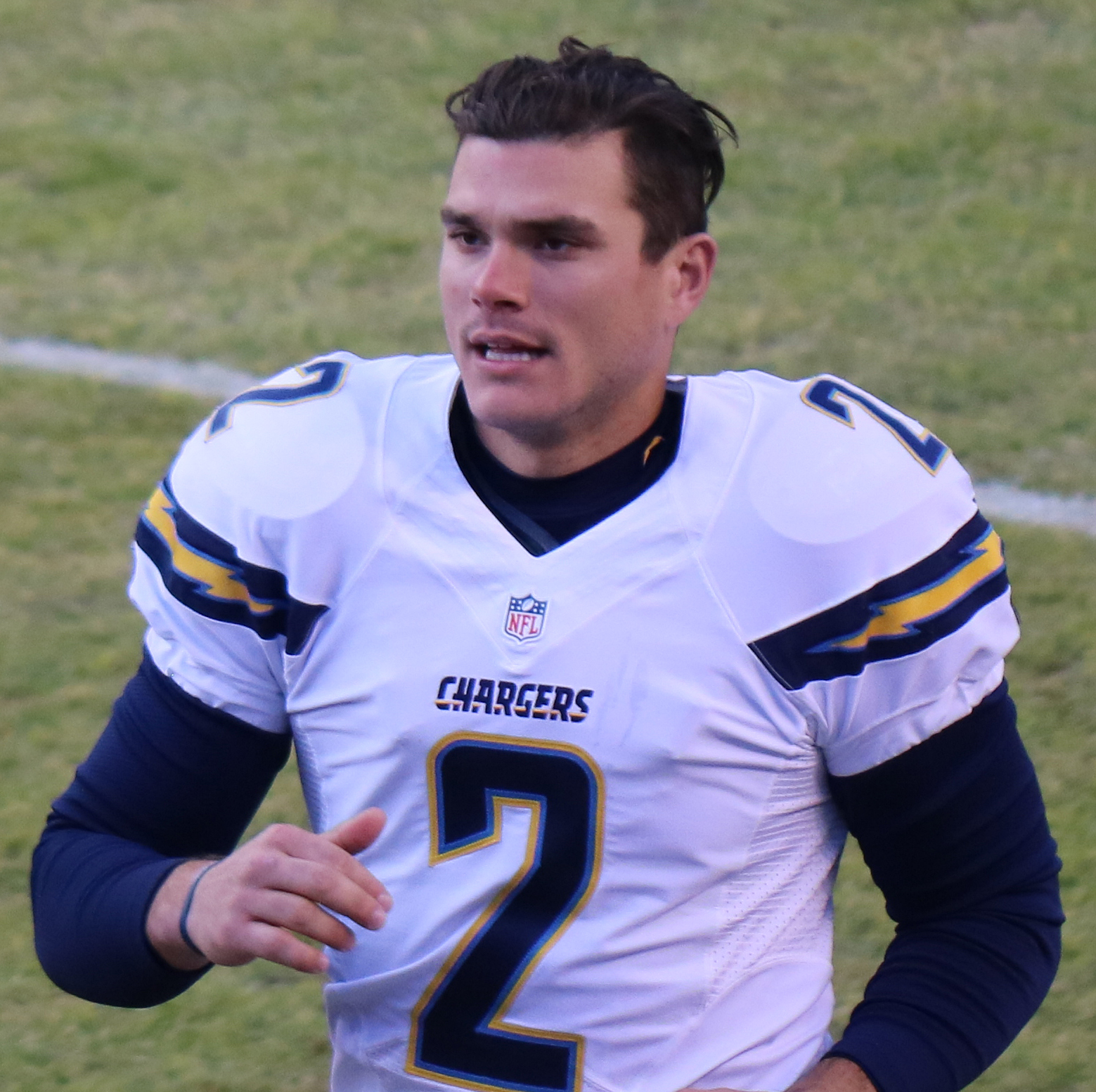
- Lambo with the San Diego Chargers in 2015

Personal information
- Full name: Joshua Gregory Lambo
- Born: November 19, 1990 (age 35) Lansing, Michigan, U.S.
- Height: 6 ft 0 in (183 cm)
- Weight: 215 lb (98 kg; 15 st 5 lb)
Association football career
- Position: Goalkeeper
Youth career
- 2005–2008: IMG Soccer Academy
Senior career*
Years	Team	Apps	(Gls)
2008–2011	FC Dallas	0	(0)
2010	→ FC Tampa Bay (loan)	6	(0)
International career
2007	United States U17	2	(0)
2008–2009	United States U20	4	(0)
Medal record
Representing United States
Runner-up	CONCACAF U-20 Championship	2009
- * Club domestic league appearances and goals

Sport
- Football career

No. 2, 4, 6
- Position: Placekicker

Career information
- High school: Middleton (Middleton, Wisconsin); IMG Academy (Bradenton, Florida)
- College: Texas A&M (2012–2014)
- NFL draft: 2015: undrafted

Career history
- San Diego Chargers (2015–2016); Jacksonville Jaguars (2017–2021); Pittsburgh Steelers (2021)*; Tennessee Titans (2022)
- * Offseason or practice squad member only

Awards and highlights
- Second-team All-Pro (2019); PFWA All-Rookie Team (2015); Second-team All-SEC (2014)

Career NFL statistics
- Field goals made: 128
- Field goals attempted: 147
- Field goal %: 87.1
- Longest field goal: 59
- Touchbacks: 198
- Stats at Pro Football Reference

Joshua Gregory Lambo (born November 19, 1990) is an American former professional football player who was a placekicker for eight seasons in the National Football League (NFL). He is currently 8th all-time in field goal percentage, having made 87.07% of his field goals in his time in the NFL.

Lambo began his athletic career as a goalkeeper in soccer. He was selected in the first round of the 2008 MLS SuperDraft by FC Dallas. Despite being a member of the team for three seasons, he never played in an MLS match. After retiring from soccer at the age of 21, he began playing college football for the Texas A&M Aggies from 2012 to 2014.

He was signed by the San Diego Chargers as an undrafted free agent in 2015, playing for the Chargers for two seasons. He was then signed by the Jacksonville Jaguars partway in the 2017 season where he spent the majority of his NFL career. With the Jaguars, he was a Second-team All-Pro in 2019. After missing most of the 2020 season due to injury, Lambo was released by the Jaguars after three games in 2021 after a poor start to the season. He subsequently had brief stints with the Pittsburgh Steelers' practice squad and the Tennessee Titans in 2021 and 2022, respectively.

== Early life ==
Born in Lansing, Michigan, Lambo moved with his family to Crystal Lake, Illinois, when he was a small child. He played club soccer for the Chicago Magic before moving to Middleton, Wisconsin, in the summer of 2005, where he attended Middleton High School for less than two months before signing a Generation Adidas contract and joining the USA Residency Program in Bradenton, Florida. In 2006, and at the age of 15, he spent the summer training with Premier League club Everton during their tour of the United States on the recommendation of USMNT international Tim Howard and was invited to Finch Farm, before being offered a professional contract on the provision that he could secure an EU passport due to his Greek heritage.

== Professional soccer career ==
=== Club career ===
Lambo was selected in the first round (8th overall) of the 2008 MLS SuperDraft by FC Dallas. He played in the MLS Reserve Division, and was a named first team substitute on several occasions, but missed most of the second half of the 2008 season after he broke his jaw in a reserve team game. Lambo never played in an MLS match, but did appear for his team in an international friendly match versus Costa Rica's CS Herediano in June 2009.

Lambo was loaned to USSF Division 2 Professional League expansion team FC Tampa Bay for the 2010 season. He made his professional debut on May 14, 2010, in a 2–1 victory over the Carolina RailHawks.

Lambo was waived by Dallas at the end of the 2011 season. He went on trial with D.C. United and Sheffield United in January 2012. After turning down offers from the NASL and the chance of becoming a MLS pool goalkeeper, he retired from professional soccer at the age of 21.

=== International career ===
Lambo made two appearances for the United States U-17 national team during the 2007 FIFA U-17 World Cup after starting the competition as a substitute. He made his debut in the third and last group stage match against Belgium, playing the whole game and keeping a clean sheet against a side that fielded future Premier League players Eden Hazard and Christian Benteke, and was the goalkeeper in the 2–1 loss against Germany in the round of 16. He was an unused substitute for the United States U-20 national team at the 2009 FIFA U-20 World Cup.

== College football career ==
In the fall of 2012, Lambo enrolled at Texas A&M University and joined the football team as a placekicker. He became starting field goal kicker after overtaking Taylor Bertolet during the 2013 season (Bertolet remained the kickoff specialist). His first career appearance came on September 22, 2012, when he made an extra point against South Carolina State. His first game-winning field goal came against Ole Miss on October 12, 2013. With the game tied at 38 and only four seconds remaining in the game, Lambo kicked a 33-yard field goal to win the game for the Aggies. Lambo converted 50 of 51 extra point attempts in the 2013 season and all 59 extra point attempts for the 2014 season. He went on to compete in the 2015 NFLPA Collegiate Bowl.

== NFL career ==
Pre-draft measurables
Height	Weight	Arm length	Hand span
6 ft 0 1/4 in (1.84 m)	216 lb (98 kg)	29 1/2 in (0.75 m)	9 in (0.23 m)
All values from NFL Combine

=== San Diego Chargers ===
On May 2, 2015, after going undrafted in the 2015 NFL draft, Lambo signed a contract as a free agent with the San Diego Chargers. Lambo was brought in for competition for the kicker spot. On September 5, Lambo won the starting job over the incumbent veteran Nick Novak. He displayed a strong leg during exhibition games, while Novak did not have a touchback in the final half of the 2014 season.

In the 2015 season, Lambo converted 26 of 32 field goal attempts. He was named to the PFWA All-Rookie Team.

On December 24, 2016, in a game against the 0–14 Cleveland Browns, Lambo missed a game tying field goal in the final seconds of the game, allowing the Browns to claim the win. In the 2016 season, Lambo converted 42 of 46 extra point attempts and 26 of 32 field goal attempts.

On September 2, 2017, Lambo was released by the Chargers after losing the starting kicker job to rookie Younghoe Koo.

=== Jacksonville Jaguars ===
On October 17, 2017, Lambo signed with the Jacksonville Jaguars. On November 12, 2017, Lambo made a game-winning 30-yard field goal in overtime to give the Jaguars a 20–17 win over the Los Angeles Chargers. In the 2017 season, Lambo converted 22 of 24 extra point attempts and 19 of 20 field goal attempts. He converted all nine extra point attempts and all four field goal attempts in the Jaguars' postseason run.

In Week 8 of the 2018 season, Lambo kicked a new career-long 57-yard field goal against the Philadelphia Eagles. He was placed on injured reserve on December 28, 2018, with a groin injury. In the 2018 season, Lambo converted 19 of 20 extra point attempts and 19 of 21 field goal attempts in 13 games.

On February 13, 2019, Lambo signed a four-year, $15.5-million contract extension with the Jaguars. In Week 4, Lambo converted two extra points and went 4-for-4 on field goals, including the game-winning 33-yarder as time expired in a 26–24 win over the Denver Broncos, earning him AFC Special Teams Player of the Week. In Week 7, Lambo hit all four of his field goals and an extra point in a 27–17 win over the Cincinnati Bengals, earning him his second AFC Special Teams Player of the Week award of the season. In the 2019 season, Lambo converted 19 of 20 extra point attempts and 33 of 34 field goal attempts.

On September 23, 2020, Lambo was placed on injured reserve with a hip injury. He was activated on October 22. In Week 9, Lambo kicked a career-long and franchise-tying 59-yard field goal against the Houston Texans. However, in the same game, he re-injured his hip on an onside kick attempt and was placed on season-ending injured reserve on November 9, 2020.

On October 19, 2021, Lambo was released by the Jaguars.

On December 15, Lambo accused first-year Jaguars head coach Urban Meyer of kicking him in the leg during warmups before the team's final preseason game. This accusation would ultimately play a pivotal role in Meyer's firing early the next day. He later filed a lawsuit against the team alleging that Meyer created a hostile work environment and the Jaguars did nothing to stop it. The lawsuit was later dismissed.

=== Pittsburgh Steelers ===
On November 2, 2021, Lambo was signed to the practice squad of the Pittsburgh Steelers. He was released on November 11.

=== Tennessee Titans ===
On November 16, 2022, Lambo signed with the Tennessee Titans as an injury replacement for Randy Bullock. Lambo made three of his four extra point attempts in a 27–17 win over the Green Bay Packers. He was waived on November 21.

On March 17, 2023, Lambo retired from professional sports. As of 2024, he ranks as the eighth most accurate kicker in NFL history, and the most accurate of all kickers that are no longer active.

== Statistics ==
Legend
**Bold**	Career high

Regular season statistics
Year	Team	GP	Field goals								Extra points			Total points
Year	Team	GP	FGM	FGA	FG%	20–29	30–39	40–49	50+	Lng	XPM	XPA	XP%	Total points
2015	SD	**16**	26	32	81.3	4–4	7–7	**11–16**	4–5	54	28	32	87.5	106
2016	SD	**16**	26	32	81.3	7–7	**13–14**	6–8	0–3	47	**46**	**42**	91.3	**120**
2017	JAX	10	19	20	95	2–2	11–11	4–5	2–2	56	24	22	91.7	79
2018	JAX	13	19	21	90.5	4–4	8–8	3–4	4–5	57	19	20	**95**	76
2019	JAX	**16**	**33**	**34**	**97.1**	**12–12**	9–9	8–9	**4–4**	56	19	20	**95**	118
2020	JAX	4	5	5	100	0–0	2–2	1–1	2–2	**59**	8	10	80	23
2021	JAX	3	0	3	0.0	0–0	0–0	0–1	0–2	−	5	7	71.4	5
2022	TEN	1	0	0	0.0	0–0	0–0	0–0	0–0	−	3	4	75	3
Total		79	128	146	87.1	29–29	50–51	33–44	16–23	59	146	163	89.6	530

Postseason statistics
Year	Team	GP	Field goals									Extra points			Total points
Year	Team	GP	FGM	FGA	FG%	<20	20−29	30−39	40−49	50+	Lng	XPM	XPA	XP%	Total points
2017	JAX	**3**	**4**	**4**	**100**	**0–0**	**0–0**	**0–0**	**3–3**	**1–1**	**54**	**9**	**9**	**100.0**	**21**
Total		3	4	4	100	0–0	0–0	0–0	3–3	1–1	54	9	9	100	21

== Personal life ==
Lambo has been married twice: firstly to Amy, and then a second time, to Megan Menefee from 2018 to 2021.
