= Dan Skuta =

American football player (born 1986)

No. 51, 55
- Position: Linebacker

Personal information
- Born: April 21, 1986 (age 40); Burton, Michigan, U.S.
- Listed height: 6 ft 2 in (1.88 m)
- Listed weight: 269 lb (122 kg)

Career information
- High school: Carman-Ainsworth (Flint Township, Michigan)
- College: Grand Valley State (2004–2008)
- NFL draft: 2009: undrafted

Career history
- Cincinnati Bengals (2009–2012); San Francisco 49ers (2013–2014); Jacksonville Jaguars (2015–2016); Chicago Bears (2017)*
- * Offseason or practice squad member only

Career NFL statistics
- Total tackle: 201
- Sacks: 7
- Forced fumbles: 6
- Fumble recoveries: 1
- Defensive touchdowns: 1
- Stats at Pro Football Reference

Dan Skuta (born April 21, 1986) is an American former professional football player who was a linebacker in the National Football League (NFL). He played college football for the Grand Valley State Lakers and was signed by the Cincinnati Bengals as an undrafted free agent in 2009. Skuta was also a member of the San Francisco 49ers, Jacksonville Jaguars, and Chicago Bears.

== Professional career ==
=== Cincinnati Bengals ===
Skuta signed with the Cincinnati Bengals as an undrafted free agent in 2009 and played with them until 2012.

=== San Francisco 49ers ===
Skuta signed with the San Francisco 49ers in 2013. He scored his first touchdown when he recovered a fumble forced by linebacker Patrick Willis and returned it 47 yards for the score.

=== Jacksonville Jaguars ===
On March 11, 2015, Skuta signed a five-year, $20.5 million contract with the Jacksonville Jaguars. He was released on April 11, 2017.

=== Chicago Bears ===
On May 8, 2017, Skuta signed a one-year contract with the Chicago Bears. He was released on September 2, 2017.

== NFL career statistics ==
Legend
	Led the league
**Bold**	Career high

=== Regular season ===
Year	Team	Games		Tackles					Interceptions					Fumbles			
Year	Team	GP	GS	Cmb	Solo	Ast	Sck	TFL	Int	Yds	TD	Lng	PD	FF	FR	Yds	TD
2009	CIN	8	0	8	6	2	0.0	0	0	0	0	0	0	0	0	0	0
2010	CIN	**16**	1	16	11	5	0.0	0	0	0	0	0	0	1	0	0	0
2011	CIN	**16**	3	31	16	**15**	0.5	0	0	0	0	0	0	1	0	0	0
2012	CIN	**16**	0	27	16	11	0.0	0	0	0	0	0	1	0	0	0	0
2013	SFO	**16**	8	28	21	7	0.0	3	0	0	0	0	**2**	0	**1**	**47**	**1**
2014	SFO	14	**10**	33	25	8	**5.0**	**5**	0	0	0	0	1	**3**	0	0	0
2015	JAX	13	8	**40**	**32**	8	1.5	3	0	0	0	0	1	1	0	0	0
2016	JAX	13	2	18	15	3	0.0	3	0	0	0	0	1	0	0	0	0
		112	32	201	142	59	7.0	14	0	0	0	0	6	6	1	47	1

=== Playoffs ===
Year	Team	Games		Tackles					Interceptions					Fumbles			
Year	Team	GP	GS	Cmb	Solo	Ast	Sck	TFL	Int	Yds	TD	Lng	PD	FF	FR	Yds	TD
2009	CIN	1	0	1	0	**1**	0.0	0	0	0	0	0	0	0	0	0	0
2011	CIN	1	0	1	1	0	0.0	0	0	0	0	0	0	0	0	0	0
2012	CIN	1	0	1	1	0	0.0	0	0	0	0	0	0	0	0	0	0
2013	SFO	**3**	0	**4**	**3**	**1**	**2.0**	**1**	0	0	0	0	0	0	0	0	0
		6	0	7	5	2	2.0	1	0	0	0	0	0	0	0	0	0

== Personal life ==
Dan Skuta is from Flint, Michigan. He attended Grand Valley State University, from which he graduated with a bachelor's degree in physical education. He now presides as the defensive coordinator coach at Flint's Powers Catholic High School.
