= Todd Wash =

American football player and coach (born 1968)

Carolina Panthers
- Title: Interim defensive coordinator & defensive line coach

Personal information
- Born: July 19, 1968 (age 58); Miles City, Montana, U.S.

Career information
- College: North Dakota State
- NFL draft: 1992: undrafted

Career history

Playing
- Houston Oilers (1992)*
- * Offseason or practice squad member only

Coaching
- Fort Lewis (1996–1999); Defensive coordinator (1996); Head coach (1997–1999); Nebraska–Kearney (2000–2001) Defensive coordinator; North Dakota State (2002–2003) Defensive line coach; Missouri Southern State (2004) Defensive coordinator & linebackers coach; North Dakota State (2005–2006) Defensive line coach; Tampa Bay Buccaneers (2007–2010); Defensive quality control coach (2007); Defensive line coach (2008–2010); Seattle Seahawks (2011–2012) Defensive line coach; Jacksonville Jaguars (2013–2020); Defensive line coach & run game coordinator (2013–2015); Defensive coordinator (2016–2020); Detroit Lions (2021–2022) Defensive line coach; Carolina Panthers (2023–present); Defensive line coach (2023–2026); Interim defensive coordinator (2026–present)

Awards and highlights
- All-North Central Conference (1990, 1991)

Head coaching record
- Career: NCAA: 11–31 (.262)
- Coaching profile at Pro Football Reference

Todd Wash (born July 19, 1968) is an American football coach who is the interim defensive coordinator for the Carolina Panthers of the National Football League (NFL). Before that, he was a defensive coach for the Detroit Lions, Jacksonville Jaguars, Seattle Seahawks and Tampa Bay Buccaneers and has served as a head coach at Fort Lewis College.

== Coaching career ==
=== Carolina Panthers ===
On February 19, 2023, the Carolina Panthers hired Wash as their defensive line coach.

On October 30, 2026, he was named interim defensive coordinator after Ejiro Evero was fired following the Panthers' 19–27 loss to Green Bay.

== Head coaching record ==
Year	Team	Overall	Conference	Standing	Bowl/playoffs
Fort Lewis Skyhawks (Rocky Mountain Athletic Conference) (1996–1999)
1996	Fort Lewis	5–5	4–4	T–5th	
1997	Fort Lewis	4–7	3–5	6th	
1998	Fort Lewis	0–10	0–8	9th	
1999	Fort Lewis	2–9	2–6	T–7th	
Fort Lewis:		11–31	9–23		
Total:		11–31			
