= Kevin Allen (tackle) =

American football player (1963-2025)

No. 72, 73, 74
- Position: Offensive tackle

Personal information
- Born: June 21, 1963; Cincinnati, Ohio, U.S.
- Died: October 10, 2025 (aged 62); Cincinnati, Ohio, U.S.
- Listed height: 6 ft 5 in (1.96 m)
- Listed weight: 285 lb (129 kg)

Career information
- High school: Northwest (Cincinnati)
- College: Indiana
- NFL draft: 1985: 1st round, 9th overall pick

Career history
- Philadelphia Eagles (1985); Orlando Thunder (1992); Kansas City Chiefs (1992)*; Cincinnati Rockers (1992–1993); Charlotte Rage (1994); Miami Hooters (1994)
- * Offseason or practice squad member only

Career NFL statistics
- Games played: 16
- Games started: 4
- Fumble recoveries: 1
- Stats at Pro Football Reference

Kevin Eugene Allen (June 21, 1963 - October 10, 2025) was an American professional football player who was a tackle in the National Football League (NFL) for one season for the Philadelphia Eagles. He played college football for the Indiana Hoosiers

Allen was an alumnus of Northwest High School in Cincinnati.

== NFL banning ==
Allen was selected by the Philadelphia Eagles with the ninth overall pick in the first round of the 1985 NFL draft. His career started against the New York Giants, a game where the Giants recorded eight sacks. By midseason, Allen was relegated to Special Teams. During the offseason, Allen moved to the center position. Eagles coach Buddy Ryan thought so little of Allen that he once described him as someone who could only be useful "if you want someone to stand around and kill the grass... he looks like a USFL reject." In 2011, Deadspin ranked Allen the fourth-worst NFL player of all time, noting "The ninth overall pick out of Indiana had a special way of blocking opposing pass rushers. He would lean his body forward, then fall down." and "Never had the Eagles had a combination of bad person-bad player that could match this guy." When Buddy Ryan was asked in an interviewed about him missing practice due to being treated at a local hospital for dehydration he said "You mean the General?" when asked about Allen's whereabouts. "You know we all call him the General, don't you? For General Hospital."

After a poor rookie season, Allen tested positive for cocaine after reporting to Eagles training camp in 1986. The Eagles released him in October 1986. Days after being cut, Allen and his roommate, Scott Cartwright, were charged with rape. Allen was sentenced to 15 years in prison, serving 33 months in prison, while Cartwright was sentenced to seven years. He was banned from the league for life soon afterward.

In spring 1991, Allen's ban was lifted. After failed tryouts with the Cincinnati Bengals and the San Francisco 49ers, the Kansas City Chiefs signed Allen in 1991, assigning him to the Orlando Thunder in the WLAF. He became the Thunder's starting right tackle for the 1992 season, recording at least 16 pancake blocks.

Allen later moved on to the Arena Football League, playing for three teams.
