= 2019 Jacksonville Jaguars season =

25th season in franchise history

- Jaguars 25th season logo
- Owner: Shahid Khan
- General manager: David Caldwell
- Head coach: Doug Marrone
- Offensive coordinator: John DeFilippo
- Defensive coordinator: Todd Wash
- Home stadium: TIAA Bank Field

Results
- Record: 6–10
- Division place: 4th AFC South
- Playoffs: Did not qualify
- All-Pros: K Josh Lambo (2nd team)
- Pro Bowlers: DE Josh Allen (alternate); DE Calais Campbell; WR D. J. Chark (alternate)

Uniform
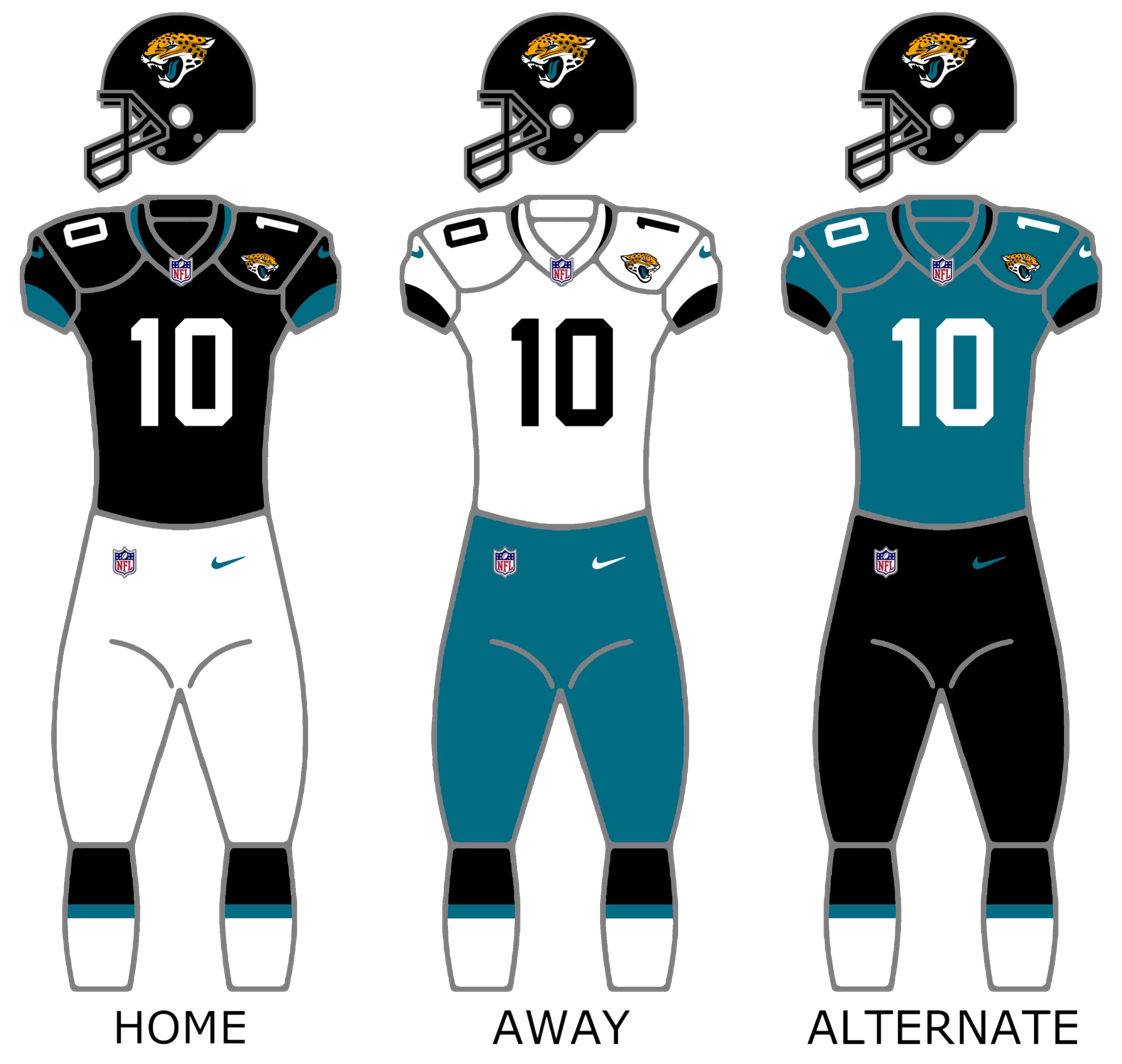

The 2019 season was the Jacksonville Jaguars' 25th in the National Football League (NFL) and their third under head coach Doug Marrone.

The Jaguars signed quarterback Nick Foles to a four-year, $88 million contract on March 11, 2019. It was also their first season since 2013 without Blake Bortles on the roster, as Bortles signed with the defending NFC champion Los Angeles Rams in free agency on March 18, 2019. Foles suffered a clavicle injury in week 1, and was replaced with rookie Gardner Minshew for the majority of the season. The Jaguars slightly improved on their 5–11 record from the previous season, but were mathematically eliminated from playoff contention for the second consecutive season after a loss to the Los Angeles Chargers.

This season, the Jags became the first team since the 1986 Tampa Bay Buccaneers to lose five straight games by 17 points or more.

== Offseason ==
=== Unrestricted free agents ===
Position	Player	Free agency tag	2019 team	Date signed
TE	Blake Bell	UFA	Kansas City Chiefs	April 2, 2019
FB	Tommy Bohanon	UFA	Green Bay Packers	August 12, 2019
LB	Blair Brown	UFA		
G	A. J. Cann	UFA	Jacksonville Jaguars	March 7, 2019
LB	Nick DeLuca	UFA	Miami Dolphins	August 2, 2019
G	Parker Ehinger	UFA	Arizona Cardinals	August 2, 2019
RB	Dimitri Flowers	UFA		
OT	Ereck Flowers	UFA	Washington Redskins	March 18, 2019
S	Tashaun Gipson	UFA	Houston Texans	March 12, 2019
RB	Corey Grant	UFA	Green Bay Packers	July 26, 2019
WR	Rashad Greene	UFA		
RB	Carlos Hyde	UFA	Kansas City Chiefs	March 9, 2019
DT	Malik Jackson	UFA	Philadelphia Eagles	March 13, 2019
QB	Landry Jones	UFA	Oakland Raiders	March 26, 2019
QB	Cody Kessler	UFA	Philadelphia Eagles	May 12, 2019
WR	Jaydon Mickens	UFA	Carolina Panthers	July 24, 2019
WR	Donte Moncrief	UFA	Pittsburgh Steelers	March 14, 2019
TE	James O'Shaughnessy	UFA	Jacksonville Jaguars	March 21, 2019
G	Patrick Omameh	UFA	New Orleans Saints	July 9, 2019
LS	Matt Overton	UFA	Jacksonville Jaguars	March 7, 2019
OT	Jermey Parnell	UFA		
CB	Tyler Patmon	UFA	Miami Dolphins	July 22, 2019
TE	Niles Paul	UFA	San Francisco 49ers	July 26, 2019
LB	Donald Payne	UFA	Baltimore Ravens	August 16, 2019
G	Chris Reed	UFA	Miami Dolphins	March 18, 2019
OT	Corey Robinson	UFA	Washington Redskins	July 27, 2019
TE	Austin Seferian-Jenkins	UFA	New England Patriots	April 10, 2019
C	Tyler Shatley	UFA	Jacksonville Jaguars	March 29, 2019
G	Josh Walker	UFA		
OT	Josh Wells	UFA	Jacksonville Jaguars	April 2, 2019
RB	David Williams	UFA	Denver Broncos	July 19, 2019
RB	T.J. Yeldon	UFA	Buffalo Bills	April 22, 2019

=== Acquisitions ===
Position	Player	2018 team	Date signed
LB	D.J. Alexander	Philadelphia Eagles	April 1, 2019
RB	Alfred Blue	Houston Texans	April 1, 2019
WR	Chris Conley	Kansas City Chiefs	March 16, 2019
RB	Benny Cunningham	Chicago Bears	April 2, 2019
QB	Nick Foles	Philadelphia Eagles	March 19, 2019
LB	Najee Goode	Indianapolis Colts	May 1, 2019
DE	Datone Jones	Dallas Cowboys	June 4, 2019
QB	Alex McGough	Seattle Seahawks	January 15, 2019
OT	Cedric Ogbuehi	Cincinnati Bengals	March 16, 2019
LB	James Onwualu	San Francisco 49ers	April 30, 2019
WR	Terrelle Pryor	Buffalo Bills	May 30, 2019
RB	Thomas Rawls	Cincinnati Bengals	January 9, 2019
LB	Jake Ryan	Green Bay Packers	March 19, 2019
TE	Geoff Swaim	Dallas Cowboys	March 15, 2019
OT	Leonard Wester	Tampa Bay Buccaneers	April 4, 2019
LB	Ramik Wilson	Los Angeles Rams	April 1, 2019

=== NFL draft ===
2019 Jacksonville Jaguars draft
Round	Pick	Player	Position	College	Notes
1	7	Josh Allen *	Defensive end	Kentucky	
2	35	Jawaan Taylor	Offensive tackle	Florida	from Oakland
3	69	Josh Oliver	Tight end	San Jose State	
3	98	Quincy Williams	Linebacker	Murray State	from LA Rams
5	140	Ryquell Armstead	Running back	Temple	from NY Jets via Oakland
6	178	Gardner Minshew *	Quarterback	Washington State	
7	235	Dontavius Russell	Defensive tackle	Auburn	from Seattle via Oakland
Made roster * Made at least one Pro Bowl during career

Pre-draft trades

- The Rams traded their third-round selection as well as their 2020 fifth-round selection to Jacksonville in exchange for defensive end Dante Fowler.
- Jacksonville traded their fifth-round selection to Cleveland in exchange for running back Carlos Hyde.
- Jacksonville traded a conditional seventh-round selection to Cleveland in exchange for quarterback Cody Kessler.
- Jacksonville traded center Luke Bowanko to Baltimore in exchange for Baltimore's seventh-round selection.

Draft day trades

- Oakland traded their second-, fifth-, and seventh-round selections to Jacksonville in exchange for Jacksonville's second- and fourth-round selections.
- Seattle traded their 2020 sixth-round selection to Jacksonville in exchange for Jacksonville's seventh-round selection (#236 overall).

=== Undrafted free agents ===
Name	Position	College
Tyre Brady	Wide receiver	Marshall
Khairi Clark	Tackle	Florida
Joe Giles-Harris	Linebacker	Duke
Donnell Greene	Offensive lineman	Minnesota
Tae Hayes	Cornerback	Appalachian State
Charles Jones	Tight end	Tulane
Raphael Leonard	Wide receiver	Southern Illinois
Taj McGowan	Running back	UCF
Carson Meier	Tight end	Oklahoma
Picasso Nelson Jr.	Cornerback	Southern Miss
Marquez Sanford	Cornerback	Murray State
Saivion Smith	Cornerback	Alabama
Dredrick Snelson	Wide receiver	UCF
Bunchy Stallings	Guard	Kentucky
Connor Strachan	Linebacker	Boston College
Michael Walker	Wide receiver	Boston College
Brandon Watson	Cornerback	Michigan
Papi White	Wide receiver	Ohio
Andrew Williams	Defensive tackle	Auburn
Andrew Wingard	Safety	Wyoming
Zedrick Woods	Safety	Ole Miss
Roderick Young	Defensive tackle	North Texas

== Staff ==
2019 Jacksonville Jaguars staff
Front office: Owner – Shahid Khan; President – Mark Lamping; General manager – David Caldwell; Senior vice president of football administration & technology – Tony Khan; Special assistant to the general manager – John Idzik Jr.; Director of football administration – Tim Walsh; Director of football operations – Hamzah Ahmad; Director of player personnel – Chris Polian; Assistant director of player personnel – Andy Dengler; Director of pro personnel – Chris Driggers; Assistant director of pro personnel – DeJuan Polk; Director of college scouting – Mark Ellenz; Assistant director of college scouting – Paul Roell; Director of player development and youth football – Marcus Pollard; Assistant to the head coach/administrator of coaching operations – ElizaBeth Mayers; Director of team administration – Tyler Wolf; Head coaches: Head coach – Doug Marrone; Offensive coaches: Offensive coordinator – John DeFilippo; Quarterbacks – Scott Milanovich; Running backs – Terry Robiskie; Assistant running backs – John Donovan; Wide receivers – Keenan McCardell; Tight ends – Ron Middleton; Offensive line – George Warhop; Assistant offensive line – Tony Sparano Jr.; Offense-research – Eric Price	Defensive coaches: Defensive coordinator – Todd Wash; Defensive line – Jason Rebrovich; Linebackers – Mark Collins; Assistant linebackers – Mike Rutenberg; Cornerbacks – Tim Walton; Safeties – Joe Danna; Senior defensive assistant – Dom Capers; Defensive assistant – Dwayne Stukes; Special teams coaches: Special teams coordinator – Joe DeCamillis; Assistant special teams Coordinator – Mike Mallory; Strength and conditioning: Strength and conditioning – Tom Myslinski; Assistant strength and conditioning – Cedric Scott; Strength & conditioning associate – Sean Karpf; Strength & conditioning associate – Jess Langvardt

== Final roster ==
2019 Jacksonville Jaguars roster
Quarterbacks (QB): 1 Joshua Dobbs; 7 Nick Foles; 15 Gardner Minshew; Running backs (RB): 23 Ryquell Armstead; 27 Leonard Fournette; 34 Jeremy McNichols; 33 Devine Ozigbo; Wide receivers (WR): 16 C. J. Board; 17 D. J. Chark; 84 Keelan Cole; 18 Chris Conley; 12 Dede Westbrook; Tight ends (TE): 88 Seth DeValve; 85 Charles Jones; 83 Ben Koyack; 86 Nick O'Leary	Offensive linemen (OL): 60 A. J. Cann G; 61 Tyler Gauthier C; 65 Brandon Linder C; 68 Andrew Norwell G; 77 Cedric Ogbuehi T; 76 Will Richardson T; 74 Cam Robinson T; 69 Tyler Shatley C; 75 Jawaan Taylor T; Defensive linemen (DL): 41 Josh Allen DE; 90 Taven Bryan DT; 93 Calais Campbell DE/DT; 79 Carl Davis DT; 95 Abry Jones DT; 91 Yannick Ngakoue DE; 98 Dontavius Russell DT; 94 Dawuane Smoot DE; 97 Akeem Spence DT	Linebackers (LB): 53 Dakota Allen OLB; 59 Preston Brown MLB; 58 Austin Calitro OLB; 43 Joe Giles-Harris OLB; 48 Leon Jacobs OLB; 54 Donald Payne MLB; Defensive backs (DB): 21 A. J. Bouye CB; 22 Cody Davis FS; 36 Ronnie Harrison SS; 25 D. J. Hayden CB; 37 Tre Herndon CB; 39 Doug Middleton FS; 35 Parry Nickerson CB; 40 Brandon Watson CB; 26 Jarrod Wilson FS; 42 Andrew Wingard SS; Special teams (ST): 9 Logan Cooke P; 4 Josh Lambo K; 46 Matthew Orzech LS	Practice squad: 45 Joe Dineen OLB; 19 Terry Godwin WR (IR); 72 Blake Hance T; 96 Chuck Harris DE; 78 Dewayne Hendrix DT; 24 Paul Perkins RB; 67 Ryan Pope T; 92 Brian Price DT (IR); 81 Matt Sokol TE; 14 Jayson Stanley WR; Reserve: 57 D. J. Alexander OLB (IR); 99 Marcell Dareus DT (IR); 52 Najee Goode OLB (IR); 73 Donnell Greene T (IR); 66 Ben Ijalana T (IR); 44 Myles Jack MLB (IR); 11 Marqise Lee WR (IR); 33 Devante Mays RB (IR); 55 Lerentee McCray DE (IR); 62 K. C. McDermott G (IR); 33 Taj McGowan RB (IR); 80 James O'Shaughnessy TE (IR); 89 Josh Oliver TE (IR); 58 James Onwualu OLB (IR); 47 Jake Ryan MLB (IR); 87 Geoff Swaim TE (IR); 70 Brandon Thomas G (IR); 13 Michael Walker WR (IR); 56 Quincy Williams OLB (IR); Rookies in italics 53 active, 21 reserve, 8 practice squad

== Preseason ==
Week	Date	Opponent	Result	Record	Venue	Recap
1	August 8	at Baltimore Ravens	L 0–29	0–1	M&T Bank Stadium	Recap
2	August 15	Philadelphia Eagles	L 10–24	0–2	TIAA Bank Field	Recap
3	August 22	at Miami Dolphins	L 7–22	0–3	Hard Rock Stadium	Recap
4	August 29	Atlanta Falcons	L 12–31	0–4	TIAA Bank Field	Recap

== Regular season ==
=== Schedule ===
Week	Date	Opponent	Result	Record	Venue	Recap
1	September 8	Kansas City Chiefs	**L** 26–40	0–1	TIAA Bank Field	Recap
2	September 15	at **Houston Texans**	**L** 12–13	0–2	NRG Stadium	Recap
3	September 19	**Tennessee Titans**	**W** 20–7	1–2	TIAA Bank Field	Recap
4	September 29	at Denver Broncos	**W** 26–24	2–2	Empower Field at Mile High	Recap
5	October 6	at Carolina Panthers	**L** 27–34	2–3	Bank of America Stadium	Recap
6	October 13	New Orleans Saints	**L** 6–13	2–4	TIAA Bank Field	Recap
7	October 20	at Cincinnati Bengals	**W** 27–17	3–4	Paul Brown Stadium	Recap
8	October 27	New York Jets	**W** 29–15	4–4	TIAA Bank Field	Recap
9	November 3	**Houston Texans**	**L** 3–26	4–5	(United Kingdom) Wembley Stadium (London)	Recap
10	Bye					
11	November 17	at **Indianapolis Colts**	**L** 13–33	4–6	Lucas Oil Stadium	Recap
12	November 24	at **Tennessee Titans**	**L** 20–42	4–7	Nissan Stadium	Recap
13	December 1	Tampa Bay Buccaneers	**L** 11–28	4–8	TIAA Bank Field	Recap
14	December 8	Los Angeles Chargers	**L** 10–45	4–9	TIAA Bank Field	Recap
15	December 15	at Oakland Raiders	**W** 20–16	5–9	RingCentral Coliseum	Recap
16	December 22	at Atlanta Falcons	**L** 12–24	5–10	Mercedes-Benz Stadium	Recap
17	December 29	**Indianapolis Colts**	**W** 38–20	6–10	TIAA Bank Field	Recap

Note: Intra-division opponents are in bold text.

=== Game summaries ===
==== Week 1: vs. Kansas City Chiefs ====
Week One: Kansas City Chiefs at Jacksonville Jaguars – Game summary

Quarter	1	2	3	4	Total
**Chiefs**	17	6	7	10	**40**
Jaguars	7	6	0	13	**26**

at TIAA Bank Field, Jacksonville, Florida

- Date: September 8
- Game time: 1:00 p.m. EDT
- Game weather: Clear, 91 °F (33 °C)
- Game attendance: 60,157
- Referee: Carl Cheffers
- TV announcers (CBS): Ian Eagle, Dan Fouts and Evan Washburn
- Recap, Game Book

Game information

**First quarter**

- KC – Sammy Watkins 68-yard pass from Patrick Mahomes (Harrison Butker kick), 13:24. Chiefs 7–0. **Drive: 3 plays, 75 yards, 1:36.**
- KC – Harrison Butker 28-yard field goal, 8:57. Chiefs 10–0. **Drive: 6 plays, 70 yards, 2:47.**
- JAX – D. J. Chark 35-yard pass from Nick Foles (Josh Lambo kick), 5:23. Chiefs 10–7. **Drive: 7 plays, 75 yards, 3:34.**
- KC – Sammy Watkins 49-yard pass from Patrick Mahomes (Harrison Butker kick), 2:36. Chiefs 17–7. **Drive: 5 plays, 80 yards, 2:47.**

**Second quarter**

- JAX – Josh Lambo 37-yard field goal, 11:36. Chiefs 17–10. **Drive: 9 plays, 56 yards, 6:00.**
- KC – Harrison Butker 25-yard field goal, 7:56. Chiefs 20–10. **Drive: 7 plays, 68 yards, 3:40.**
- JAX – Josh Lambo 23-yard field goal, 4:22. Chiefs 20–13. **Drive: 5 plays, 70 yards, 3:34.**
- KC – Harrison Butker 46-yard field goal, 0:24. Chiefs 23–13. **Drive: 10 plays, 47 yards, 3:58.**

**Third quarter**

- KC – Damien Williams 1-yard run (Harrison Butker kick), 2:25. Chiefs 30–13. **Drive: 12 plays, 60 yards, 6:25.**

**Fourth quarter**

- KC – Sammy Watkins 3-yard pass from Patrick Mahomes (Harrison Butker kick), 10:56. Chiefs 37–13. **Drive: 8 plays, 67 yards, 4:19.**
- JAX – Dede Westbrook 15-yard pass from Gardner Minshew (pass failed), 7:32. Chiefs 37–19. **Drive: 7 plays, 79 yards, 3:24.**
- KC – Harrison Butker 35-yard field goal, 3:33. Chiefs 40–19. **Drive: 4 plays, −5 yards, 1:41.**
- JAX – Chris Conley 21-yard pass from Gardner Minshew (Josh Lambo kick), 1:55. Chiefs 40–26. **Drive: 6 plays, 75 yards, 1:38.**

**Top passers**

- KC – Patrick Mahomes – 25/33, 378 yards, 3 TD
- JAX – Gardner Minshew – 22/25, 275 yards, 2 TD, INT

**Top rushers**

- KC – LeSean McCoy – 10 rushes, 81 yards
- JAX – Leonard Fournette – 13 rushes, 66 yards

**Top receivers**

- KC – Sammy Watkins – 9 receptions, 198 yards, 3 TD
- JAX – D. J. Chark – 4 receptions, 146 yards, TD

==== Week 2: at Houston Texans ====
Week Two: Jacksonville Jaguars at Houston Texans – Game summary

Quarter	1	2	3	4	Total
Jaguars	0	3	0	9	**12**
**Texans**	3	3	0	7	**13**

at NRG Stadium, Houston, Texas

- Date: September 15
- Game time: 1:00 p.m. EDT/12:00 p.m. CDT
- Game weather: None (retractable roof closed)
- Game attendance: 71,651
- Referee: Scott Novak
- TV announcers (CBS): Andrew Catalon and James Lofton
- Recap, Game Book

Game information

**First quarter**

- HOU – Kaʻimi Fairbairn 39-yard field goal, 1:54. Texans 3–0. **Drive: 15 plays, 71 yards, 7:15.**

**Second quarter**

- JAX – Josh Lambo 40-yard field goal, 3:17. Tied 3–3. **Drive: 10 plays, 47 yards, 5:20.**
- HOU – Kaʻimi Fairbairn 22-yard field goal, 0:00. Texans 6–3. **Drive: 11 plays, 71 yards, 3:17.**

**Third quarter**

- No scoring plays.

**Fourth quarter**

- HOU – Deshaun Watson 2-yard run (Kaʻimi Fairbairn kick), 11:35. Texans 13–3. **Drive: 4 plays, 11 yards, 1:24.**
- JAX – Josh Lambo 32-yard field goal, 6:01. Texans 13–6. **Drive: 9 plays, 61 yards, 5:34.**
- JAX – D. J. Chark 4-yard pass from Gardner Minshew (run failed), 0:30. Texans 13–12. **Drive: 14 plays, 68 yards, 3:06.**

**Top passers**

- JAX – Gardner Minshew – 23/33, 213 yards, TD
- HOU – Deshaun Watson – 16/29, 159 yards

**Top rushers**

- JAX – Gardner Minshew – 6 rushes, 56 yards
- HOU – Carlos Hyde – 20 rushes, 90 yards

**Top receivers**

- JAX – Chris Conley – 4 receptions, 73 yards
- HOU – Will Fuller – 4 receptions, 40 yards

==== Week 3: vs. Tennessee Titans ====
Week Three: Tennessee Titans at Jacksonville Jaguars – Game summary

Quarter	1	2	3	4	Total
Titans	0	0	0	7	**7**
**Jaguars**	14	0	3	3	**20**

at TIAA Bank Field, Jacksonville, Florida

- Date: September 19
- Game time: 8:20 p.m. EDT
- Game weather: Light rain, 73 °F (23 °C)
- Game attendance: 58,613
- Referee: Shawn Hochuli
- TV announcers (NFLN/WJXX): Joe Buck, Troy Aikman, Erin Andrews and Kristina Pink
- Recap, Game Book

Game information

**First quarter**

- JAX – James O'Shaughnessy 7-yard pass from Gardner Minshew (Josh Lambo kick), 13:02. Jaguars 7–0. **Drive: 1 play, 7 yards, 0:05.**
- JAX – D. J. Chark 22-yard pass from Gardner Minshew (Josh Lambo kick), 6:36. Jaguars 14–0. **Drive: 6 plays, 62 yards, 3:32.**

**Second quarter**

- No scoring plays.

**Third quarter**

- JAX – Josh Lambo 40-yard field goal, 7:54. Jaguars 17–0. **Drive: 7 plays, 58 yards, 3:33.**

**Fourth quarter**

- TEN – Derrick Henry 1-yard run (Cairo Santos kick), 12:04. Jaguars 17–7. **Drive: 7 plays, 66 yards, 2:42.**
- JAX – Josh Lambo 48-yard field goal, 7:34. Jaguars 20–7. **Drive: 9 plays, 45 yards, 4:30.**

**Top passers**

- TEN – Marcus Mariota – 23/40, 304 yards
- JAX – Gardner Minshew – 20/30, 204 yards, 2 TD

**Top rushers**

- TEN – Derrick Henry – 17 rushes, 44 yards, TD
- JAX – Leonard Fournette – 15 rushes, 66 yards

**Top receivers**

- TEN – Adam Humphries – 6 receptions, 93 yards
- JAX – D. J. Chark – 4 receptions, 76 yards, TD

==== Week 4: at Denver Broncos ====
Week Four: Jacksonville Jaguars at Denver Broncos – Game summary

Quarter	1	2	3	4	Total
**Jaguars**	3	3	14	6	**26**
Broncos	7	10	0	7	**24**

at Empower Field at Mile High, Denver, Colorado

- Date: September 29
- Game time: 4:25 p.m. EDT/2:25 p.m. MDT
- Game weather: Sunny, 87 °F (31 °C)
- Game attendance: 76,219
- Referee: Ronald Torbert
- TV announcers (CBS): Andrew Catalon and James Lofton
- Recap, Game Book

Game information

**First quarter**

- DEN – Noah Fant 25-yard pass from Joe Flacco (Brandon McManus kick), 8:17. Broncos 7–0. **Drive: 2 plays, 53 yards, 0:50.**
- JAX – Josh Lambo 25-yard field goal, 3:13. Broncos 7–3. **Drive: 10 plays, 68 yards, 5:04.**

**Second quarter**

- DEN – Courtland Sutton 7-yard pass from Joe Flacco (Brandon McManus kick), 13:39. Broncos 14–3. **Drive: 6 plays, 69 yards, 2:32.**
- DEN – Brandon McManus 33-yard field goal, 4:16. Broncos 17–3. **Drive: 11 plays, 49 yards, 4:27.**
- JAX – Josh Lambo 40-yard field goal, 0:08. Broncos 17–6. **Drive: 7 plays, 21 yards, 0:41.**

**Third quarter**

- JAX – Ryquell Armstead 7-yard pass from Gardner Minshew (Josh Lambo kick), 4:36. Broncos 17–13. **Drive: 16 plays, 75 yards, 10:24.**
- JAX – James O'Shaughnessy 18-yard pass from Gardner Minshew (Josh Lambo kick), 1:10. Jaguars 20–17. **Drive: 3 plays, 93 yards, 1:47.**

**Fourth quarter**

- JAX – Josh Lambo 34-yard field goal, 2:54. Jaguars 23–17. **Drive: 13 plays, 78 yards, 7:00.**
- DEN – Courtland Sutton 8-yard pass from Joe Flacco (Brandon McManus kick), 1:32. Broncos 24–23. **Drive: 6 plays, 75 yards, 1:22.**
- JAX – Josh Lambo 33-yard field goal, 0:00. Jaguars 26–24. **Drive: 8 plays, 60 yards, 1:32.**

**Top passers**

- JAX – Gardner Minshew – 19/33, 213 yards, 2 TD
- DEN – Joe Flacco – 22/38, 303 yards, 3 TD, INT

**Top rushers**

- JAX – Leonard Fournette – 29 rushes, 225 yards
- DEN – Phillip Lindsay – 9 rushes, 53 yards

**Top receivers**

- JAX – Dede Westbrook – 5 receptions, 66 yards
- DEN – Emmanuel Sanders – 5 receptions, 104 yards

==== Week 5: at Carolina Panthers ====
Week Five: Jacksonville Jaguars at Carolina Panthers – Game summary

Quarter	1	2	3	4	Total
Jaguars	7	10	7	3	**27**
**Panthers**	14	7	7	6	**34**

at Bank of America Stadium, Charlotte, North Carolina

- Date: October 6
- Game time: 1:00 p.m. EDT
- Game weather: Cloudy, 72 °F (22 °C)
- Game attendance: 72,762
- Referee: Alex Kemp
- TV announcers (CBS): Andrew Catalon, James Lofton and A.J. Ross
- Recap, Game Book

Game information

**First quarter**

- CAR – Christian McCaffrey 5-yard run (Joey Slye kick), 9:23. Panthers 7–0. **Drive: 8 plays, 78 yards, 5:37.**
- JAX – D. J. Chark 37-yard pass from Gardner Minshew (Josh Lambo kick), 7:27. Tied 7–7. **Drive: 4 plays, 75 yards, 1:56.**
- CAR – Christian McCaffrey 18-yard pass from Kyle Allen (Joey Slye kick), 1:35. Panthers 14–7. **Drive: 3 plays, 24 yards, 1:51.**

**Second quarter**

- CAR – Brian Burns 56-yard fumble return (Joey Slye kick), 13:32. Panthers 21–7.
- JAX – D. J. Chark 11-yard pass from Gardner Minshew (Josh Lambo kick), 6:07. Panthers 21–14. **Drive: 6 plays, 83 yards, 3:39.**
- JAX – Josh Lambo 35-yard field goal, 0:58. Panthers 21–17. **Drive: 8 plays, 37 yards, 1:59.**

**Third quarter**

- CAR – Christian McCaffrey 84-yard run (Joey Slye kick), 13:49. Panthers 28–17. **Drive: 1 play, 84 yards, 0:12.**
- JAX – Leonard Fournette 1-yard run (Josh Lambo kick), 10:27. Panthers 28–24. **Drive: 6 plays, 75 yards, 3:22.**

**Fourth quarter**

- JAX – Josh Lambo 38-yard field goal, 5:52. Panthers 28–27. **Drive: 11 plays, 73 yards, 6:01.**
- CAR – Reggie Bonnafon 59-yard run (kick failed), 3:34. Panthers 34–27. **Drive: 4 plays, 75 yards, 2:18.**

**Top passers**

- JAX – Gardner Minshew – 26/44, 374 yards, 2 TD
- CAR – Kyle Allen – 17/30, 181 yards, TD

**Top rushers**

- JAX – Leonard Fournette – 23 rushes, 108 yards, TD
- CAR – Christian McCaffrey – 19 rushes, 176 yards, 2 TD

**Top receivers**

- JAX – D. J. Chark – 8 receptions, 164 yards, 2 TD
- CAR – D. J. Moore – 6 receptions, 91 yards

==== Week 6: vs. New Orleans Saints ====
Week Six: New Orleans Saints at Jacksonville Jaguars – Game summary

Quarter	1	2	3	4	Total
**Saints**	3	0	3	7	**13**
Jaguars	0	3	3	0	**6**

at TIAA Bank Field, Jacksonville, Florida

- Date: October 13
- Game time: 1:00 p.m. EDT
- Game weather: Sunny, 81 °F (27 °C)
- Game attendance: 64,341
- Referee: Jerome Boger
- TV announcers (CBS): Greg Gumbel, Trent Green and Melanie Collins
- Recap, Game Book

Game information

**First quarter**

- NO – Wil Lutz 47-yard field goal, 2:29. Saints 3–0. **Drive: 7 plays, 8 yards, 2:31.**

**Second quarter**

- JAX – Josh Lambo 22-yard field goal, 2:41. Tied 3–3. **Drive: 13 plays, 66 yards, 7:04.**

**Third quarter**

- NO – Wil Lutz 21-yard field goal, 8:40. Saints 6–3. **Drive: 11 plays, 57 yards, 4:49.**
- JAX – Josh Lambo 32-yard field goal, 3:11. Tied 6–6. **Drive: 10 plays, 61 yards, 5:29.**

**Fourth quarter**

- NO – Jared Cook 4-yard pass from Teddy Bridgewater (Wil Lutz kick), 11:49. Saints 13–6. **Drive: 11 plays, 75 yards, 6:22.**

**Top passers**

- NO – Teddy Bridgewater – 24/36, 240 yards, TD
- JAX – Gardner Minshew – 14/29, 163 yards, INT

**Top rushers**

- NO – Latavius Murray – 8 rushes, 44 yards
- JAX – Leonard Fournette – 20 rushes, 72 yards

**Top receivers**

- NO – Michael Thomas – 8 receptions, 89 yards
- JAX – Dede Westbrook – 3 receptions, 53 yards

==== Week 7: at Cincinnati Bengals ====
Week Seven: Jacksonville Jaguars at Cincinnati Bengals – Game summary

Quarter	1	2	3	4	Total
**Jaguars**	0	6	3	18	**27**
Bengals	0	7	3	7	**17**

at Paul Brown Stadium, Cincinnati, Ohio

- Date: October 20
- Game time: 1:00 p.m. EDT
- Game weather: Partly sunny, 70 °F (21 °C)
- Game attendance: 42,784
- Referee: Craig Wrolstad
- TV announcers (CBS): Kevin Harlan, Rich Gannon and Jay Feely
- Recap, Game Book

Game information

**First quarter**

- No scoring plays.

**Second quarter**

- JAX – Josh Lambo 21-yard field goal, 6:30. Jaguars 3–0. **Drive: 11 plays, 69 yards, 5:19.**
- CIN – Joe Mixon 2-yard pass from Andy Dalton (Randy Bullock kick), 1:25. Bengals 7–3. **Drive: 6 plays, 80 yards, 0:49.**
- JAX – Josh Lambo 29-yard field goal, 0:04. Bengals 7–6. **Drive: 9 plays, 64 yards, 1:21.**

**Third quarter**

- JAX – Josh Lambo 37-yard field goal, 6:52. Jaguars 9–7. **Drive: 12 plays, 38 yards, 6:28.**
- CIN – Randy Bullock 38-yard field goal, 0:31. Bengals 10–9. **Drive: 10 plays, 72 yards, 3:07.**

**Fourth quarter**

- JAX – Keelan Cole 2-yard pass from Gardner Minshew (pass succeeded), 12:41. Jaguars 17–10. **Drive: 5 plays, 75 yards, 2:50.**
- JAX – Yannick Ngakoue 23-yard interception return (Josh Lambo kick), 4:18. Jaguars 24–10.
- JAX – Josh Lambo 26-yard field goal, 1:56. Jaguars 27–10. **Drive: 7 plays, 29 yards, 2:03.**
- CIN – Andy Dalton 1-yard run (Randy Bullock kick), 0:23. Jaguars 27–17. **Drive: 9 plays, 69 yards, 1:33.**

**Top passers**

- JAX – Gardner Minshew – 15/32, 255 yards, TD
- CIN – Andy Dalton – 22/43, 276 yards, TD, 3 INT

**Top rushers**

- JAX – Leonard Fournette – 29 rushes, 131 yards
- CIN – Andy Dalton – 4 rushes, 33 yards, 1 TD

**Top receivers**

- JAX – Dede Westbrook – 6 receptions, 103 yards
- CIN – Alex Erickson – 8 receptions, 137 yards

==== Week 8: vs. New York Jets ====
Week Eight: New York Jets at Jacksonville Jaguars – Game summary

Quarter	1	2	3	4	Total
Jets	7	0	0	8	**15**
**Jaguars**	13	6	3	7	**29**

at TIAA Bank Field, Jacksonville, Florida

- Date: October 27
- Game time: 1:00 p.m. EDT
- Game weather: Clear, 79 °F (26 °C)
- Game attendance: 57,833
- Referee: Brad Allen
- TV announcers (CBS): Spero Dedes and Adam Archuleta
- Recap, Game Book

Game information

**First quarter**

- JAX – Keelan Cole 6-yard pass from Gardner Minshew (kick failed), 12:39. Jaguars 6–0. **Drive: 4 plays, 77 yards, 2:21.**
- NYJ – Ryan Griffin 24-yard pass from Sam Darnold (Sam Ficken kick), 4:51. Jets 7–6. **Drive: 12 plays, 93 yards, 7:48.**
- JAX – Chris Conley 70-yard pass from Gardner Minshew (Josh Lambo kick), 1:11. Jaguars 13–7. **Drive: 2 plays, 73 yards, 0:50.**

**Second quarter**

- JAX – Josh Lambo 29-yard field goal, 2:57. Jaguars 16–7. **Drive: 17 plays, 84 yards, 8:56.**
- JAX – Josh Lambo 43-yard field goal, 0:11. Jaguars 19–7. **Drive: 10 plays, 39 yards, 1:32.**

**Third quarter**

- JAX – Josh Lambo 24-yard field goal, 2:11. Jaguars 22–7. **Drive: 8 plays, 64 yards, 3:03.**

**Fourth quarter**

- NYJ – Ryan Griffin 3-yard pass from Sam Darnold (pass succeeded), 13:07. Jaguars 22–15. **Drive: 9 plays, 75 yards, 4:04.**
- JAX – D. J. Chark 8-yard pass from Gardner Minshew (Josh Lambo kick), 4:13. Jaguars 29–15. **Drive: 8 plays, 24 yards, 4:26.**

**Top passers**

- NYJ – Sam Darnold – 21/30, 218 yards, 2 TD, 3 INT
- JAX – Gardner Minshew – 22/34, 279 yards, 3 TD

**Top rushers**

- NYJ – Le'Veon Bell – 9 rushes, 23 yards
- JAX – Leonard Fournette – 19 rushes, 76 yards

**Top receivers**

- NYJ – Ryan Griffin – 4 receptions, 66 yards, 2 TD
- JAX – Chris Conley – 4 receptions, 103 yards, TD

==== Week 9: vs. Houston Texans ====
NFL London Games

Week Nine: Houston Texans at Jacksonville Jaguars – Game summary

Quarter	1	2	3	4	Total
**Texans**	3	6	10	7	**26**
Jaguars	0	3	0	0	**3**

at Wembley Stadium, London, England

- Date: November 3
- Game time: 2:30 p.m. GMT/9:30 a.m. EST
- Game weather: Cloudy, 53 °F (12 °C)
- Game attendance: 84,771
- Referee: Clete Blakeman
- TV announcers (NFLN/WJXX): Rich Eisen, Kurt Warner, Steve Mariucci, Michael Irvin and Melissa Stark
- Recap, Game Book

Game information

**First quarter**

- HOU – Kaʻimi Fairbairn 52-yard field goal, 8:20. Texans 3–0. **Drive: 13 plays, 47 yards, 6:40.**

**Second quarter**

- HOU – Darren Fells 1-yard pass from Deshaun Watson (kick blocked), 5:55. Texans 9–0. **Drive: 14 plays, 80 yards, 8:14.**
- JAX – Josh Lambo 30-yard field goal, 1:48. Texans 9–3. **Drive: 11 plays, 63 yards, 4:07.**

**Third quarter**

- HOU – Kaʻimi Fairbairn 42-yard field goal, 4:57. Texans 12–3. **Drive: 7 plays, 26 yards, 3:59.**
- HOU – Duke Johnson 1-yard run (Kaʻimi Fairbairn kick), 0:31. Texans 19–3. **Drive: 5 plays, 79 yards, 2:19.**

**Fourth quarter**

- HOU – DeAndre Hopkins 1-yard pass from Deshaun Watson (Kaʻimi Fairbairn kick), 4:19. Texans 26–3. **Drive: 2 plays, 3 yards, 0:10.**

**Top passers**

- HOU – Deshaun Watson – 22/28, 201 yards, 2 TD
- JAX – Gardner Minshew – 27/47, 309 yards, 2 INT

**Top rushers**

- HOU – Carlos Hyde – 19 carries, 160 yards
- JAX – Leonard Fournette – 11 carries, 40 yards

**Top receivers**

- HOU – Duke Johnson – 5 receptions, 68 yards
- JAX – Keelan Cole – 5 receptions, 80 yards

==== Week 11: at Indianapolis Colts ====
Week Eleven: Jacksonville Jaguars at Indianapolis Colts – Game summary

Quarter	1	2	3	4	Total
Jaguars	7	0	0	6	**13**
**Colts**	7	3	14	9	**33**

at Lucas Oil Stadium, Indianapolis, Indiana

- Date: November 17
- Game time: 1:00 p.m. EST
- Game weather: None (retractable roof closed)
- Game attendance: 61,986
- Referee: Shawn Hochuli
- TV announcers (CBS): Andrew Catalon, James Lofton and Michael Grady
- Recap, Game Book

Game information

**First quarter**

- JAX – D. J. Chark 34-yard pass from Nick Foles (Josh Lambo kick), 6:53. Jaguars 7–0. **Drive: 5 plays, 60 yards, 3:02.**
- IND – Marlon Mack 13-yard run (Adam Vinatieri kick), 0:35. Tied 7–7. **Drive: 11 plays, 76 yards, 6:18.**

**Second quarter**

- IND – Adam Vinatieri 34-yard field goal, 8:26. Colts 10–7. **Drive: 9 plays, 54 yards, 4:11.**

**Third quarter**

- IND – Marcus Johnson 1-yard pass from Jacoby Brissett (Adam Vinatieri kick), 8:46. Colts 17–7. **Drive: 10 plays, 77 yards, 6:14.**
- IND – Jacoby Brissett 5-yard run (Adam Vinatieri kick), 0:58. Colts 24–7. **Drive: 5 plays, 56 yards, 2:55.**

**Fourth quarter**

- IND – Nyheim Hines 7-yard run (Adam Vinatieri kick), 12:42. Colts 31–7. **Drive: 4 plays, 64 yards, 2:10.**
- JAX – D. J. Chark 20-yard pass from Nick Foles, 0:59. Colts 31–13. **Drive: 11 plays, 90 yards, 3:29.**
- IND - Nick Foles pass to Chris Conley intercepted, returned by Bobby Okereke for 2 point conversion, 0:59. Colts 33–13.

**Top passers**

- JAX – Nick Foles – 33/47, 296 yards, 2 TD, INT
- IND – Jacoby Brissett – 15/24, 148 yards, TD, INT

**Top rushers**

- JAX – Leonard Fournette – 8 rushes, 23 yards
- IND – Jonathan Williams – 13 rushes, 116 yards

**Top receivers**

- JAX – D. J. Chark – 8 receptions, 104 yards, 2 TD
- IND – Marcus Johnson – 4 receptions, 38 yards

==== Week 12: at Tennessee Titans ====
Week Twelve: Jacksonville Jaguars at Tennessee Titans – Game summary

Quarter	1	2	3	4	Total
Jaguars	0	3	8	9	**20**
**Titans**	0	7	28	7	**42**

at Nissan Stadium, Nashville, Tennessee

- Date: November 24
- Game time: 4:05 p.m. EST/3:05 p.m. CST
- Game weather: Sunny, 52 °F (11 °C)
- Game attendance: 60,926
- Referee: Shawn Smith
- TV announcers (CBS): Ian Eagle, Dan Fouts and Evan Washburn
- Recap, Game Book

Game information

**First quarter**

- No scoring plays.

**Second quarter**

- TEN – Ryan Tannehill 21-yard run (Ryan Succop kick), 6:29. Titans 7–0. **Drive: 7 plays, 73 yards, 4:09.**
- JAX – Josh Lambo 49-yard field goal, 1:50. Titans 7–3. **Drive: 9 plays, 44 yards, 4:39.**

**Third quarter**

- TEN – Dennis Kelly 1-yard pass from Ryan Tannehill (Ryan Succop kick), 13:13. Titans 14–3. **Drive: 4 plays, 64 yards, 1:47.**
- TEN – Derrick Henry 74-yard run (Ryan Succop kick), 10:40. Titans 21–3. **Drive: 1 play, 74 yards, 0:11.**
- TEN – Derrick Henry 7-yard run (Ryan Succop kick), 10:24. Titans 28–3. **Drive: 1 play, 7 yards, 0:06.**
- TEN – A. J. Brown 65-yard pass from Ryan Tannehill (Ryan Succop kick), 6:57. Titans 35–3. **Drive: 3 plays, 80 yards, 1:26.**
- JAX – Leonard Fournette 1-yard run (pass succeeded), 2:23. Titans 35–11. **Drive: 12 plays, 74 yards, 4:34.**

**Fourth quarter**

- JAX – Leonard Fournette 1-yard run (pass failed), 11:50. Titans 35–17. **Drive: 7 plays, 56 yards, 2:57.**
- TEN – Ryan Tannehill 3-yard run (Ryan Succop kick), 9:47. Titans 42–17. **Drive: 4 plays, 40 yards, 2:03.**
- JAX – Josh Lambo 50-yard field goal, 4:48. Titans 42–20. **Drive: 13 plays, 56 yards, 4:59.**

**Top passers**

- JAX – Nick Foles – 32/48, 272 yards
- TEN – Ryan Tannehill – 14/18, 259 yards, 2 TD

**Top rushers**

- JAX – Leonard Fournette – 24 rushes, 97 yards, 2 TD
- TEN – Derrick Henry – 19 rushes, 159 yards, 2 TD

**Top receivers**

- JAX – Dede Westbrook – 8 receptions, 69 yards
- TEN – A. J. Brown – 4 receptions, 135 yards, TD

==== Week 13: vs. Tampa Bay Buccaneers ====
Week Thirteen: Tampa Bay Buccaneers at Jacksonville Jaguars – Game summary

Quarter	1	2	3	4	Total
**Buccaneers**	15	10	0	3	**28**
Jaguars	0	0	3	8	**11**

at TIAA Bank Field, Jacksonville, Florida

- Date: December 1
- Game time: 1:00 p.m. EST
- Game attendance: 62,633
- Referee: Walt Anderson
- TV announcers (Fox): Dick Stockton, Mark Schlereth and Jennifer Hale
- Recap, Game Book

Game information

**First quarter**

- TB – Peyton Barber 15-yard run (Matt Gay kick), 2:49. Buccaneers 7–0. **Drive: 8 plays, 69 yards, 3:40.**
- TB – Devin White 14-yard fumble return (Peyton Barber run), 2:39. Buccaneers 15–0.

**Second quarter**

- TB – Peyton Barber 1-yard run (Matt Gay kick), 7:58. Buccaneers 22–0. **Drive: 7 plays, 83 yards, 3:22.**
- TB – Matt Gay 25-yard field goal, 0:57. Buccaneers 25–0. **Drive: 7 plays, 47 yards, 1:29.**

**Third quarter**

- JAX – Josh Lambo 53-yard field goal, 5:46. Buccaneers 25–3. **Drive: 7 plays, 26 yards, 3:29.**

**Fourth quarter**

- JAX – Dede Westbrook 3-yard pass from Gardner Minshew (pass succeeded), 13:37. Buccaneers 25–11. **Drive: 4 plays, 54 yards, 1:28.**
- TB – Matt Gay 37-yard field goal, 2:19. Buccaneers 28–11. **Drive: 4 plays, 5 yards, 0:58.**

**Top passers**

- TB – Jameis Winston – 21/33, 268 yards
- JAX – Gardner Minshew – 16/27, 147 yards, TD, INT

**Top rushers**

- TB – Peyton Barber – 17 rushes, 44 yards, 2 TD
- JAX – Leonard Fournette – 14 rushes, 38 yards

**Top receivers**

- TB – Breshad Perriman – 5 receptions, 87 yards
- JAX – Dede Westbrook – 5 receptions, 60 yards, TD

==== Week 14: vs. Los Angeles Chargers ====
Week Fourteen: Los Angeles Chargers at Jacksonville Jaguars – Game summary

Quarter	1	2	3	4	Total
**Chargers**	7	17	14	7	**45**
Jaguars	3	0	7	0	**10**

at TIAA Bank Field, Jacksonville, Florida

- Date: December 8
- Game time: 4:05 p.m. EST
- Game attendance: 57,866
- Referee: Bill Vinovich
- TV announcers (Fox): Dick Stockton, Mark Schlereth and Jennifer Hale
- Recap, Game Book

Game information

**First quarter**

- JAX - Josh Lambo 26-yard field goal, 7:23. Jaguars 3-0. **Drive: 14 plays, 67 yards, 7:37.**
- LAC - Melvin Gordon 1-yard run (Michael Badgley kick), 5:46. Chargers 7-3. **Drive: 3 plays, 79 yards, 1:37.**

**Second quarter**

- LAC - Derek Watt 1-yard run (Michael Badgley kick), 5:18. Chargers 14-3. **Drive: 10 plays, 75 yards, 6:11.**
- LAC - Hunter Henry 30-yard pass from Philip Rivers (Michael Badgley kick), 1:34. Chargers 21-3. **Drive: 2 plays, 80 yards, 0:18.**
- LAC - Michael Badgley 40-yard field goal, 0:03. Chargers 24-3. **Drive: 8 plays, 57 yards, 1:07.**

**Third quarter**

- LAC - Austin Ekeler 84-yard pass from Philip Rivers (Michael Badgley kick), 13:53. Chargers 31-3. **Drive: 3 plays, 84 yards, 1:07.**
- JAX - Nick O'Leary 12-yard pass from Gardner Minshew (Josh Lambo kick), 5:48. Chargers 31-10. **Drive: 14 plays, 70 yards, 8:05.**
- LAC - Mike Williams 44-yard pass from Philip Rivers (Michael Badgley kick), 1:51. Chargers 38-10. **Drive: 6 plays, 73 yards, 3:57.**

**Fourth quarter**

- LAC - Virgil Green 14-yard pass from Tyrod Taylor (Michael Badgley kick), 10:53. Chargers 45-10. **Drive: 7 plays, 38 yards, 4:01.**

**Top passers**

- JAX – Gardner Minshew – 24/37, 162 yards, TD
- LAC – Philip Rivers – 16/22, 314 yards, 3 TD

**Top rushers**

- JAX – Leonard Fournette – 15 rushes, 50 yards
- LAC – Austin Ekeler – 8 rushes, 101 yards

**Top receivers**

- JAX – D. J. Chark – 9 receptions, 75 yards
- LAC – Austin Ekeler – 4 receptions, 112 yards, TD

==== Week 15: at Oakland Raiders ====
Week Fifteen: Jacksonville Jaguars at Oakland Raiders – Game summary

Quarter	1	2	3	4	Total
**Jaguars**	3	0	3	14	**20**
Raiders	10	6	0	0	**16**

at Ring Central Coliseum, Oakland, California

- Date: December 15
- Game time: 4:05 p.m. EST/1:05 p.m. PST
- Game weather: Sunny, 59 °F (15 °C)
- Game attendance: 52,788
- Referee: Brad Rogers
- TV announcers (CBS): Kevin Harlan, Rich Gannon and John Schriffen
- Recap, Game Book

Game information

**First quarter**

- OAK – Tyrell Williams 40-yard pass from Derek Carr (Daniel Carlson kick), 11:29. Raiders 7–0. **Drive: 7 plays, 75 yards, 3:31.**
- JAX – Josh Lambo 28-yard field goal, 8:09. Raiders 7–3. **Drive: 7 plays, 65 yards, 3:20.**
- OAK – Daniel Carlson 33-yard field goal, 4:53. Raiders 10–3. **Drive: 8 plays, 60 yards, 3:16.**

**Second quarter**

- OAK – Daniel Carlson 34-yard field goal, 2:21. Raiders 13–3. **Drive: 9 plays, 35 yards, 3:34.**
- OAK – Daniel Carlson 27-yard field goal, 0:00. Raiders 16–3. **Drive: 8 plays, 69 yards, 1:17.**

**Third quarter**

- JAX – Josh Lambo 43-yard field goal, 0:28. Raiders 16–6. **Drive: 15 plays, 59 yards, 8:21.**

**Fourth quarter**

- JAX – Chris Conley 6-yard pass from Gardner Minshew (Josh Lambo kick), 5:15. Raiders 16–13. **Drive: 11 plays, 79 yards, 5:54.**
- JAX – Chris Conley 4-yard pass from Gardner Minshew (Josh Lambo kick), 0:31. Jaguars 20–16. **Drive: 7 plays, 65 yards, 1:13.**

**Top passers**

- JAX – Gardner Minshew – 17/29, 201 yards, 2 TD
- OAK – Derek Carr – 22/36, 267 yards, TD

**Top rushers**

- JAX – Leonard Fournette – 15 rushes, 42 yards
- OAK – Josh Jacobs – 24 rushes, 89 yards

**Top receivers**

- JAX – Keelan Cole – 3 receptions, 76 yards
- OAK – Darren Waller – 8 receptions, 122 yards

==== Week 16: at Atlanta Falcons ====
Week Sixteen: Jacksonville Jaguars at Atlanta Falcons – Game summary

Quarter	1	2	3	4	Total
Jaguars	0	3	3	6	**12**
**Falcons**	14	3	0	7	**24**

at Mercedes-Benz Stadium, Atlanta, Georgia

- Date: December 22
- Game time: 1:00 p.m. EST
- Game weather: None (retractable roof closed)
- Game attendance: 70,873
- Referee: Adrian Hill
- TV announcers (Fox): Joe Davis, Brady Quinn and Jenny Taft
- Recap, Game Book

Game information

**First quarter**

- ATL - Devonta Freeman 17-yard run (Younghoe Koo kick), 11:27. Falcons 7-0. **Drive: 6 plays, 82 yards, 3:33.**
- ATL - Devonta Freeman 8-yard pass from Matt Ryan (Younghoe Koo kick), 9:28. Falcons 14-0. **Drive: 4 plays, 25 yards, 1:50.**

**Second quarter**

- JAX - Josh Lambo 40-yard field goal, 9:12. Falcons 14-3. **Drive: 11 plays, 62 yards, 5:03.**
- ATL - Younghoe Koo 23-yard field goal, 0:10. Falcons 17-3. **Drive: 11 plays, 54 yards, 1:37.**

**Third quarter**

- JAX - Josh Lambo 27-yard field goal, 2:29. Falcons 17-6. **Drive: 9 plays, 62 yards, 4:10.**

**Fourth quarter**

- ATL - Qadree Ollison 3-yard run (Younghoe Koo kick), 13:36. Falcons 24-6. **Drive: 7 plays, 87 yards, 3:53.**
- JAX - Chris Conley 42-yard pass from Gardner Minshew (pass failed), 12:00. Falcons 24-12. **Drive: 4 plays, 75 yards, 1:36.**

**Top passers**

- JAX – Gardner Minshew – 13/31, 181 yards, TD
- ATL – Matt Ryan – 32/45, 384 yards, TD, 2 INT

**Top rushers**

- JAX – Leonard Fournette – 15 rushes, 71 yards
- ATL – Brian Hill – 7 rushes, 66 yards

**Top receivers**

- JAX – Chris Conley – 2 receptions, 56 yards, TD
- ATL – Julio Jones – 10 receptions, 166 yards

==== Week 17: vs. Indianapolis Colts ====
Week Seventeen: Indianapolis Colts at Jacksonville Jaguars – Game summary

Quarter	1	2	3	4	Total
Colts	10	10	0	0	**20**
**Jaguars**	3	13	8	14	**38**

at TIAA Bank Field, Jacksonville, Florida

- Date: December 29
- Game time: 4:25 p.m. EST
- Game attendance: 58,472
- Referee: Brad Allen
- TV announcers (CBS): Spero Dedes and Adam Archuleta
- Recap, Game Book

Game information

**First quarter**

- IND – Chase McLaughlin 20-yard field goal, 9:06. Colts 3–0. **Drive: 11 plays, 73 yards, 5:54.**
- JAX – Josh Lambo 20-yard field goal, 6:19. Tied 3–3. **Drive: 7 plays, 42 yards, 2:47.**
- IND – Marlon Mack 5-yard run (Chase McLaughlin kick), 0:41. Colts 10–3. **Drive: 12 plays, 79 yards, 5:38.**

**Second quarter**

- JAX – Josh Lambo 53-yard field goal, 12:00. Colts 10–6. **Drive: 9 plays, 40 yards, 3:41.**
- JAX – Keelan Cole 14-yard pass from Gardner Minshew (Josh Lambo kick), 5:42. Jaguars 13–10. **Drive: 7 plays, 90 yards, 3:59.**
- IND – Marlon Mack 8-yard run (Chase McLaughlin kick), 2:11. Colts 17–13. **Drive: 6 plays, 55 yards, 3:31.**
- IND – Chase McLaughlin 50-yard field goal, 0:39. Colts 20–13. **Drive: 4 plays, 5 yards, 0:47.**
- JAX – Josh Lambo 56-yard field goal, 0:00. Colts 20–16. **Drive: 7 plays, 35 yards, 0:39.**

**Third quarter**

- JAX – Ryquell Armstead 3-yard pass from Gardner Minshew (pass succeeded), 8:27. Jaguars 24–20. **Drive: 11 plays, 80 yards, 6:33.**

**Fourth quarter**

- JAX – Calais Campbell 8-yard fumble return (Josh Lambo kick), 9:28. Jaguars 31–20.
- JAX – Dede Westbrook 18-yard pass from Gardner Minshew (Josh Lambo kick), 4:42. Jaguars 38–20. **Drive: 6 plays, 34 yards, 3:03.**

**Top passers**

- IND – Jacoby Brissett – 12/25, 162 yards
- JAX – Gardner Minshew – 27/39, 295 yards, 3 TD, INT

**Top rushers**

- IND – Marlon Mack – 15 rushes, 77 yards, 2 TD
- JAX – Ryquell Armstead – 10 rushes, 33 yards

**Top receivers**

- IND – T. Y. Hilton – 3 receptions, 72 yards
- JAX – Dede Westbrook – 7 receptions, 72 yards, TD

=== Standings ===
==== Division ====
AFC South
	W	L	T	PCT	DIV	CONF	PF	PA	STK
^{(4)} Houston Texans	10	6	0	.625	4–2	8–4	378	385	L1
^{(6)} Tennessee Titans	9	7	0	.563	3–3	7–5	402	331	W1
Indianapolis Colts	7	9	0	.438	3–3	5–7	361	373	L1
Jacksonville Jaguars	6	10	0	.375	2–4	6–6	300	397	W1

==== Conference ====
AFC
#	Team	Division	W	L	T	PCT	DIV	CONF	SOS	SOV	STK
**Division leaders**
1	Baltimore Ravens	North	14	2	0	.875	5–1	10–2	.494	.484	W12
2 (Note: Kansas City claimed the No. 2 seed over New England based on head-to-head victory.)	Kansas City Chiefs	West	12	4	0	.750	6–0	9–3	.510	.477	W6
3	New England Patriots	East	12	4	0	.750	5–1	8–4	.469	.411	L1
4	Houston Texans	South	10	6	0	.625	4–2	8–4	.520	.488	L1
**Wild Cards**
5	Buffalo Bills	East	10	6	0	.625	3–3	7–5	.461	.363	L2
6	Tennessee Titans	South	9	7	0	.563	3–3	7–5	.488	.465	W1
**Did not qualify for the postseason**
7	Pittsburgh Steelers	North	8	8	0	.500	3–3	6–6	.502	.324	L3
8 (Note: Denver finished ahead of Indianapolis and NY Jets based on conference record. Division tiebreak was initially used to eliminate Oakland (see below).) (Note: Denver finished ahead of Oakland based on conference record.)	Denver Broncos	West	7	9	0	.438	3–3	6–6	.510	.406	W2
9 (Note: Oakland and Indianapolis finished ahead of NY Jets based on conference record.) (Note: Oakland finished ahead of Indianapolis based on head-to-head victory.)	Oakland Raiders	West	7	9	0	.438	3–3	5–7	.482	.335	L1
10	Indianapolis Colts	South	7	9	0	.438	3–3	5–7	.492	.500	L1
11	New York Jets	East	7	9	0	.438	2–4	4–8	.473	.402	W2
12 (Note: Jacksonville finished ahead of Cleveland based on record against common opponents. Jacksonville's cumulative record against Cincinnati, Denver, NY Jets, and Tennessee was 4–1, compared to Cleveland's 2–3 cumulative record against the same four teams.)	Jacksonville Jaguars	South	6	10	0	.375	2–4	6–6	.484	.406	W1
13	Cleveland Browns	North	6	10	0	.375	3–3	6–6	.533	.479	L3
14 (Note: LA Chargers finished ahead of Miami based on head-to-head victory.)	Los Angeles Chargers	West	5	11	0	.313	0–6	3–9	.514	.488	L3
15	Miami Dolphins	East	5	11	0	.313	2–4	4–8	.484	.463	W2
16	Cincinnati Bengals	North	2	14	0	.125	1–5	2–10	.553	.406	W1
**Tiebreakers** (Note: When breaking ties for three or more teams under the NFL's rules, they are first broken within divisions, then comparing only the highest ranked remaining team from each division.)
