= WNSD =

High school radio station in Cincinnati, Ohio (1972–1978)

- Cincinnati, Ohio; United States
- Frequency: 90.1 MHz

Programming
- Format: Variety

Ownership
- Owner: Colerain High School; (Northwest Local School District)

History
- First air date: December 19, 1972
- Last air date: February 10, 1978
- Call sign meaning: Northwest Local School District

Technical information
- Class: D
- ERP: 10 watts
- Transmitter coordinates: 39°13′55″N 84°36′11″W

WNSD was a noncommercial radio station owned by the Northwest Local School District in Cincinnati, Ohio, broadcasting on 90.1 FM. WNSD, based at Colerain High School, operated from December 19, 1972, to February 10, 1978.

== History ==
In April 1972, after approving the station proposal in December 1971, the Northwest Local School District filed an application with the Federal Communications Commission to build a new 10-watt noncommercial educational FM station in Cincinnati. The FCC granted the construction permit to the school district on August 9, sooner than district officials had expected. The district selected the WNSD call letters before going on air on December 19, 1972. Per the plan approved by the school board, studio equipment was to be built and assembled by school woodworking and electronics students, allowing $5,000 worth of equipment to be put into service for just $500.

Upon signing on, the station broadcast for nearly 12 hours a day on weekdays. When students were listening (in the early morning, at lunch and in the afternoon) and the station was piped into the cafeteria, WNSD was an upbeat Top 40 outlet; in the late morning and early afternoon hours, WNSD broadcast easy listening music. Public service announcements and Colerain home sports coverage were also featured. The station's first program director, Mark Hevel, was the son of the operations manager of WCPO-TV; electronics instructor John Freeman served as faculty advisor.

Under faculty advisor Freeman's supervision, and new station manager, Chris Heather, students created all of the broadcast programming. The school's principal, Carl Banks, was supportive of WNSD and in helping maintain its on-the-air status. Delbert Williams served as the second faculty advisor, after Freeman left Colerain High School; Marian Pysarchuk followed him.

Several students went on to professional broadcast careers. Bill Dennison, currently with 700 WLW in Cincinnati, and, Christopher Geisen, currently with the nationally syndicated BOB & TOM Show, and, WTUE-FM in Dayton, OH, both got their start at WNSD-FM.

In the mid-1970s, the Northwest Local School District entered into financial difficulties. At the same time, Pysarchuk became pregnant and went on maternity leave until September. The district was unable to find a qualified faculty director to replace her, and with the station continuing on a small budget of $8,000 a year, it was decided to shut the station down indefinitely, with the final day of broadcasts being February 10, 1978. The approval of an emergency property tax lifted hopes for the board that was convened to decide the fate of the facility; it recommended that WNSD be put back into service at an estimated annual cost of $25,000 to provide a station manager, United Press International wire, and equipment repairs. The Northwest Local School District opted not to follow the board's recommendations, justifying the decision by noting that the 10-watt outlet did not reach some of the district's area and offered limited classroom experience. Without realizing the value of an FCC FM radio station license, the Northwest Board of Education let the license expire, and missed out on the opportunity for a huge profit, from selling the station license to another entity in the Cincinnati area.
