= Colerain Heights, Ohio =

Unincorporated community in Ohio, U.S.

Coordinates: 39°14′26″N 84°35′53″W

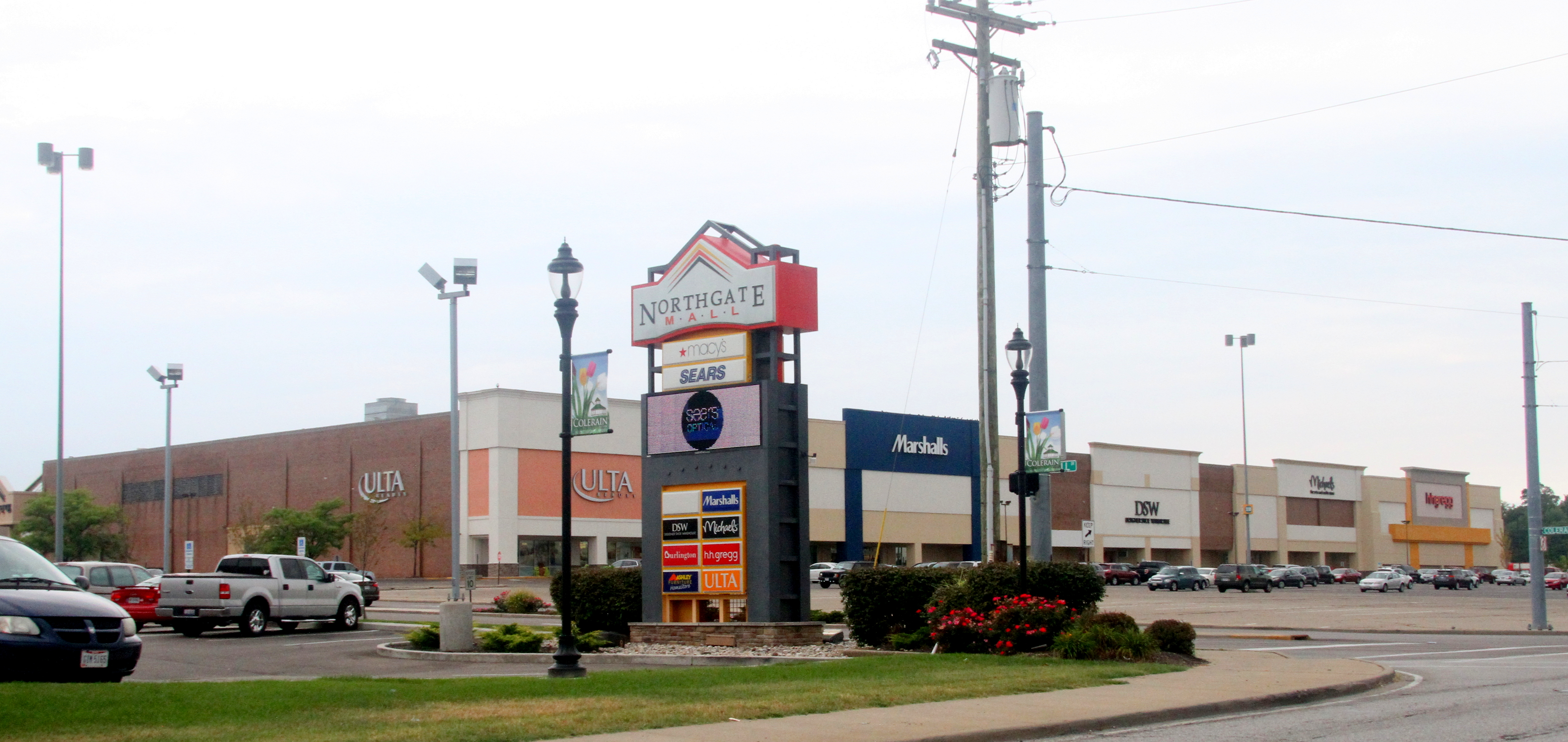
Northgate Mall in Colerain Heights

Colerain Heights is an unincorporated community in Colerain Township, Hamilton County, Ohio, United States, near Cincinnati. Most of Colerain Heights is contained around the intersection of Colerain Avenue and Springdale Road in Colerain Township. K-12 Students in the small community attend schools in the Northwest Local School District within Colerain and Green Townships. The community contains Northgate Mall, one of Cincinnati's major shopping malls, which contains stores such as Macy's, Sears, Aeropostale, Foot Locker, among other stores.
