= Eugene Clifford =

American football player (born 1988)

No. 3
- Position: Safety

Personal information
- Born: January 29, 1988 (age 38); Cincinnati, Ohio
- Listed height: 6 ft 2 in (1.88 m)
- Listed weight: 205 lb (93 kg)

Career information
- High school: Colerain (Cincinnati, Ohio)
- College: Tennessee State
- NFL draft: 2011: undrafted

Career history
- Baltimore Ravens (2011)*; Texas Revolution (2013)
- * Offseason or practice squad member only

Awards and highlights
- All-OVC First Team (2009); All-OVC Second Team (2008)
- Stats at Pro Football Reference

Eugene Clifford (born January 29, 1988) is an American former football safety. He was signed by the Baltimore Ravens as an undrafted free agent in 2011. He played college football for Tennessee State University and Ohio State University.

== Early life ==
A native of Cincinnati, Ohio, Clifford attended Colerain High School where he collected 130 tackles and had four interceptions his senior season when he helped lead the team to a 15-0 record and the state championship. He was named Ohio's 2006 Division I Defensive Player of the Year, and earned All-American honors from USA Today and Parade. In the 2007 U.S. Army All-American Bowl he caught two interceptions.

Regarded as a five-star recruit by Scout.com, Clifford was ranked as the No. 2 safety prospect in the class of 2007, behind only Chad Jones.

== College career ==
Clifford played four games as a true freshman at Ohio State University, before being suspended in December 2007 for violating team rules. In July 2008 he was charged with misdemeanor assault, accused of punching two employees of a sports bar. Later that month, he transferred to Tennessee State.

In his first season with the Tigers, he started all 12 games and finished second on team in tackles with 61 (42 solo, 19 assists). He also recorded three interceptions for 81 yards. Clifford received TSU Football Joe W. Gilliam Defensive Player of the Year Award and was named All-Ohio Valley Conference Second-team.

After finishing his junior season as the third leading tackler for the Big Blue, being credited with 60 stops (34 solo), 2 fumble recoveries, 2 interceptions with 12 passes defended (5 break-up), he was named All-OVC First-team.
