= 2020 Pro Bowl =

National Football League all-star game

2020 NFL Pro Bowl
NFC	AFC
33	38
Head coach: Pete Carroll (Seattle Seahawks)	Head coach: John Harbaugh (Baltimore Ravens)
	1	2	3	4	Total
NFC	7	7	13	6	33
AFC	7	17	7	7	38
- Date: January 26, 2020
- Stadium: Camping World Stadium; Orlando, Florida
- Offensive MVP: Lamar Jackson, QB (Baltimore Ravens)
- Defensive MVP: Calais Campbell, DE (Jacksonville Jaguars)
- Referee: Craig Wrolstad
- Attendance: 54,024

Ceremonies
- National anthem: Tori Kelly

TV in the United States
- Network: ESPN; ESPN Deportes; ABC; Disney XD
- Announcers: Joe Tessitore (play-by-play); Booger McFarland (color commentator); Lisa Salters (sideline reporter)

Radio in the United States
- Network: Westwood One
- Announcers: Ryan Radtke (play-by-play); Tony Boselli (color commentator); Amber Theoharis (sideline reporter)

The 2020 Pro Bowl was the National Football League's all-star game for the 2019 NFL season. It was played on January 26, 2020, at Camping World Stadium in Orlando, Florida, and was televised nationally by ESPN, while being simulcast on ABC and Disney XD.

Fan voting began on November 12, 2019, and ended on December 12, 2019. The initial roster was released on December 17, 2019. The Baltimore Ravens tied an NFL record (set by the 2007 Dallas Cowboys) by having 13 players selected to the game. The coaching staff for the AFC was led by John Harbaugh of the Baltimore Ravens, and for the NFC by Pete Carroll of the Seattle Seahawks. The AFC won the game, 38–33.

This was the first occasion since the 1995 season that the New York Giants had no player make the Pro Bowl.

The game was largely overshadowed by the news of NBA legend Kobe Bryant's death in a helicopter crash on the day the game was held, which also killed his 13-year-old daughter Gianna, and 7 other victims. The helicopter crash prompted the NFL to conduct a moment of silence during the game for Bryant and the other victims of the crash, with various on-field tributes occurring throughout the game.

== Background ==
The NFL's three-year contract with Camping World Stadium in Orlando, Florida, expired after the 2019 game. The league explored alternative sites, including hosting the game in Miami a week after the Super Bowl. In August 2019, the NFL decided to keep the game in Orlando for an additional year.

=== Rule changes ===
As in previous years, some rules for the Pro Bowl were different from the regular season. Some of the rules used in this game were:

- After a score, there was no kickoff, as in previous years' Pro Bowls. The scoring team had two options:
  - Give the opposing team the ball at the opposing team's own 25-yard line (equivalent to a touchback), or
  - Run one play from the scoring team's 25-yard line, in lieu of an onside kick. If the scoring team gains at least 15 yards it retains possession and is awarded a first down; otherwise, the other team takes over at the dead ball spot. In essence, it is a 4th-and-15 play from a team's own 25-yard line.
    - The "onside kick" option was exercised by the NFC in the 4th quarter, resulting in QB Kirk Cousins throwing an interception to Earl Thomas.
- False start penalties on receivers flexed to the line of scrimmage were relaxed. A receiver could flinch or lift one foot off the ground without penalty.

== Summary ==
=== Box score ===
2020 Pro Bowl: AFC vs NFC

Quarter	1	2	3	4	Total
NFC	7	7	13	6	33
AFC	7	17	7	7	38

at Camping World Stadium in Orlando, Florida

- Date: January 26, 2020
- Game time: 3:00 p.m. EST
- Game weather: 65 °F (18 °C), Sunny
- Referee: Craig Wrolstad (4)
- TV announcers (ESPN/ABC): Joe Tessitore, Booger McFarland and Lisa Salters
- Recap at NFL.com, Game Book, ESPN game summary

Scoring summary

Quarter	Time	Drive			Team	Scoring information	Score	
Quarter	Time	Plays	Yards	TOP	Team	Scoring information	NFC	AFC
1	5:03	5	90	2:41	NFC	Michael Thomas 16-yard touchdown reception from Drew Brees, Wil Lutz kick good	7	0
1	0:17	8	75	4:48	AFC	Andre Roberts 15-yard touchdown reception from Lamar Jackson, Justin Tucker kick good	7	7
2	11:37	7	75	3:38	NFC	Amari Cooper 6-yard touchdown reception from Russell Wilson, Wil Lutz kick good	14	7
2	4:35	12	75	7:02	AFC	Mark Andrews 3-yard touchdown reception from Lamar Jackson, Justin Tucker kick good	14	14
2	1:00	5	56	0:58	AFC	Jack Doyle 13-yard touchdown reception from Deshaun Watson, Justin Tucker kick good	14	21
2	0:06	3	30	0:21	AFC	50-yard field goal by Justin Tucker	14	24
3	8:06	–	–	–	NFC	Interception returned 61 yards for touchdown by Fletcher Cox, Wil Lutz kick good	21	24
3	2:57	5	69	2:41	NFC	Davante Adams 13-yard touchdown reception from Kirk Cousins, Wil Lutz kick no good (blocked)	27	24
3	1:37	3	75	1:19	AFC	D. J. Chark 60-yard touchdown reception from Ryan Tannehill, Justin Tucker kick good	27	31
4	10:29	–	–	–	AFC	Fumble recovery returned 82 yards for touchdown by T. J. Watt, Justin Tucker kick good	27	38
4	4:37	11	75	5:45	NFC	Davante Adams 4-yard touchdown reception from Kirk Cousins, 2-point run failed (Kirk Cousins sacked)	33	38
"TOP" = time of possession. For other American football terms, see Glossary of American football.							33	38

=== Statistics ===
Statistics	NFC	AFC
First downs	18	27
Total yards	382	452
Rushes–yards	4–21	20–71
Passing yards	361	381
Passing: Comp–Att–Int	23–42–2	31–45–3
Time of possession	25:24	34:36

Team	Category	Player	Statistics
NFC	Passing	Kirk Cousins	13/22, 181 yards, 2 TD, 1 INT
NFC	Rushing	Dalvin Cook	3 carries, 17 yards
NFC	Receiving	Kenny Golladay	3 receptions, 109 yards
AFC	Passing	Lamar Jackson	16/23, 185 yards, 2 TD, 1 INT
AFC	Rushing	Mark Ingram II	5 carries, 31 yards
AFC	Receiving	Mark Andrews	9 receptions, 73 yards, 1 TD

=== Starting lineups ===
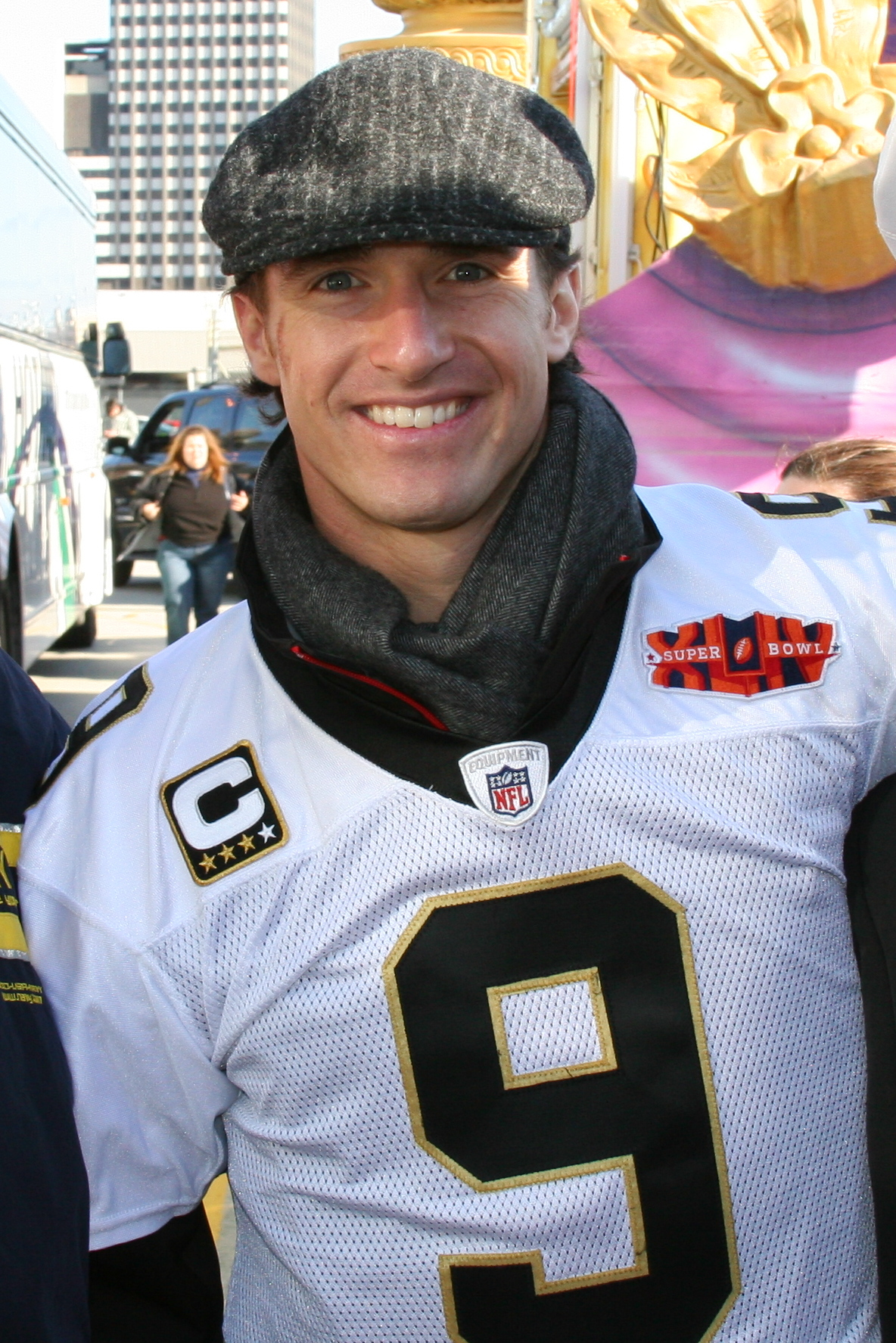
NFC starting quarterback Drew Brees of the New Orleans Saints

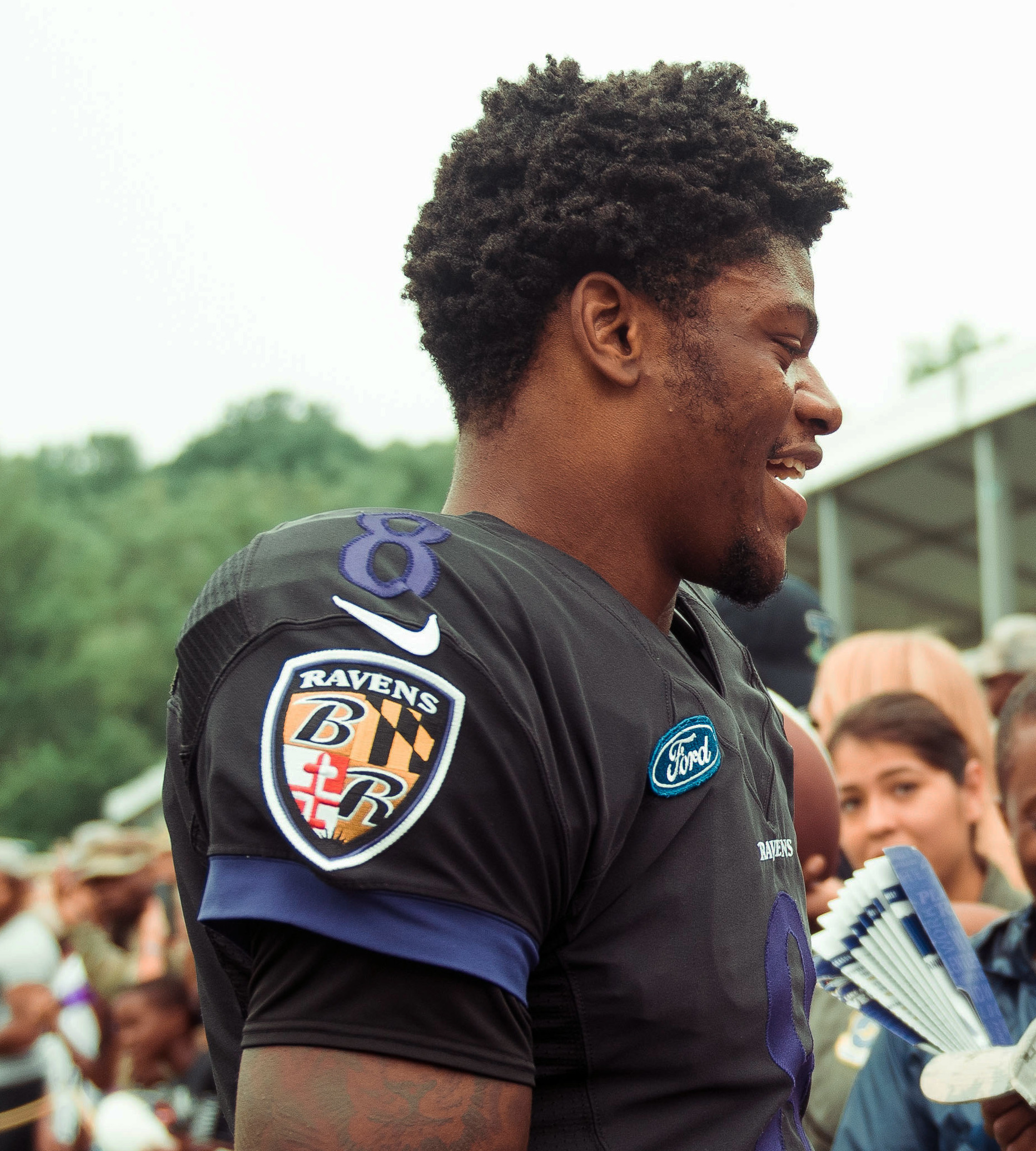
AFC starting quarterback Lamar Jackson of the Baltimore Ravens

NFC	Position	AFC
Offense
Michael Thomas	WR	Keenan Allen
Jared Cook	TE	Mark Andrews
Terron Armstead	LT	Laremy Tunsil
Andrus Peat	LG	Quenton Nelson
Jason Kelce	C	Rodney Hudson
Trai Turner	RG	Marshal Yanda
Tyron Smith	RT	Ronnie Stanley
Amari Cooper	WR	Jarvis Landry
Drew Brees	QB	Lamar Jackson
Dalvin Cook	RB	Nick Chubb
C. J. Ham	FB	Patrick Ricard
Defense
Danielle Hunter	DE	Calais Campbell
Grady Jarrett	DT	Geno Atkins
Fletcher Cox	DT	Cameron Heyward
Cameron Jordan	DE	Melvin Ingram
Chandler Jones	OLB	Von Miller
Jaylon Smith	MLB	Shaquille Leonard
Shaquil Barrett	OLB	T. J. Watt
Harrison Smith	SS	Jamal Adams
Budda Baker	FS	Minkah Fitzpatrick
Kyle Fuller	CB	Tre'Davious White
Darius Slay	CB	Stephon Gilmore

== AFC roster ==
The following players were selected as the AFC Pro Bowl Team:

=== Offense ===
Position	Starter(s)	Reserve(s)	Alternate(s)
Quarterback	8 Lamar Jackson, Baltimore	15 Patrick Mahomes, Kansas City^{[d]} 4 Deshaun Watson, Houston	17 Ryan Tannehill, Tennessee^{[a]}
Running back	24 Nick Chubb, Cleveland	22 Derrick Henry, Tennessee; 21 Mark Ingram II, Baltimore	
Fullback	42 Patrick Ricard, Baltimore		
Wide receiver	10 DeAndre Hopkins, Houston^{[b]} 13 Keenan Allen, LA Chargers	80 Jarvis Landry, Cleveland; 10 Tyreek Hill, Kansas City^{[d]}	14 Courtland Sutton, Denver^{[a]} 17 D. J. Chark, Jacksonville^{[a]}
Tight end	87 Travis Kelce, Kansas City^{[d]}	89 Mark Andrews, Baltimore	84 Jack Doyle, Indianapolis^{[a]}
Offensive tackle	79 Ronnie Stanley, Baltimore; 78 Laremy Tunsil, Houston	77 Trent Brown, Oakland^{[b]}	78 Orlando Brown Jr., Baltimore^{[a]}
Guard	73 Marshal Yanda, Baltimore; 56 Quenton Nelson, Indianapolis	66 David DeCastro, Pittsburgh^{[b]}	75 Joel Bitonio, Cleveland^{[a]}
Center	53 Maurkice Pouncey, Pittsburgh^{[b]}	61 Rodney Hudson, Oakland	78 Ryan Kelly, Indianapolis^{[a]}

=== Defense ===
Position	Starter(s)	Reserve(s)	Alternate(s)
Defensive end	97 Joey Bosa, LA Chargers^{[b]} 55 Frank Clark, Kansas City^{[d]}	93 Calais Campbell, Jacksonville	54 Melvin Ingram, LA Chargers^{[a]} 41 Josh Allen, Jacksonville^{[a]}
Defensive tackle	97 Cameron Heyward, Pittsburgh; 95 Chris Jones, Kansas City^{[d]}	97 Geno Atkins, Cincinnati	99 Jurrell Casey, Tennessee^{[a]}
Outside linebacker	58 Von Miller, Denver; 90 T. J. Watt, Pittsburgh	99 Matthew Judon, Baltimore	
Inside linebacker	53 Darius Leonard, Indianapolis	54 Dont'a Hightower, New England^{[b]}	49 Tremaine Edmunds, Buffalo^{[a]}
Cornerback	24 Stephon Gilmore, New England; 27 Tre'Davious White, Buffalo	24 Marcus Peters, Baltimore^{[b]} 44 Marlon Humphrey, Baltimore	23 Joe Haden, Pittsburgh^{[a]}
Free safety	39 Minkah Fitzpatrick, Pittsburgh	29 Earl Thomas, Baltimore	
Strong safety	33 Jamal Adams, NY Jets		

=== Special teams ===
Position	Starter(s)	Alternate(s)
Punter	6 Brett Kern, Tennessee	
Placekicker	9 Justin Tucker, Baltimore	
Return specialist	17 Mecole Hardman, Kansas City^{[d]}	18 Andre Roberts, Buffalo^{[a]}
Special teams	18 Matthew Slater, New England	
Long snapper	46 Morgan Cox, Baltimore	

== NFC roster ==
The following players were selected as the NFC Pro Bowl Team:

=== Offense ===
Position(s)	Starter(s)	Reserve(s)	Alternate(s)
Quarterback	3 Russell Wilson, Seattle^{[f]}	9 Drew Brees, New Orleans; 12 Aaron Rodgers, Green Bay^{[e]}	8 Kirk Cousins, Minnesota^{[a]}
Running back	33 Dalvin Cook, Minnesota	22 Christian McCaffrey, Carolina^{[b]} 21 Ezekiel Elliott, Dallas	41 Alvin Kamara, New Orleans^{[a]}
Fullback	44 Kyle Juszczyk, San Francisco^{[d]}		30 C. J. Ham, Minnesota^{[a]}
Wide receiver	11 Julio Jones, Atlanta^{[e]} 13 Michael Thomas, New Orleans	13 Mike Evans, Tampa Bay^{[b]} 12 Chris Godwin, Tampa Bay^{[b]}	19 Amari Cooper, Dallas^{[a]} 19 Kenny Golladay, Detroit^{[a]} 17 Davante Adams, Green Bay^{[a]}
Tight end	85 George Kittle, San Francisco^{[d]}	86 Zach Ertz, Philadelphia^{[b]}	87 Jared Cook, New Orleans^{[a]} 81 Austin Hooper, Atlanta^{[a]}
Offensive tackle	69 David Bakhtiari, Green Bay^{[e]} 77 Tyron Smith, Dallas	72 Terron Armstead, New Orleans	65 Lane Johnson, Philadelphia^{[a]}
Guard	70 Zack Martin, Dallas^{[b]} 79 Brandon Brooks, Philadelphia^{[b]}	75 Brandon Scherff, Washington^{[b]}	70 Trai Turner, Carolina^{[a]} 75 Andrus Peat, New Orleans^{[a]} 67 Larry Warford, New Orleans^{[a]}
Center	62 Jason Kelce, Philadelphia	72 Travis Frederick, Dallas	

=== Defense ===
Position	Starter(s)	Reserve(s)	Alternate(s)
Defensive end	94 Cameron Jordan, New Orleans; 97 Nick Bosa, San Francisco^{[d]}	99 Danielle Hunter, Minnesota	97 Everson Griffen, Minnesota^{[a]}
Defensive tackle	99 Aaron Donald, LA Rams^{[e]} 91 Fletcher Cox, Philadelphia	97 Grady Jarrett, Atlanta	97 Kenny Clark, Green Bay^{[a]}
Outside linebacker	55 Chandler Jones, Arizona; 52 Khalil Mack, Chicago^{[e]}	58 Shaquil Barrett, Tampa Bay	55 Za'Darius Smith, Green Bay^{[a]}
Inside linebacker	54 Bobby Wagner, Seattle^{[e]}	59 Luke Kuechly, Carolina^{[b]}	54 Jaylon Smith, Dallas^{[a]} 54 Eric Kendricks, Minnesota^{[a]}
Cornerback	23 Marshon Lattimore, New Orleans^{[e]} 25 Richard Sherman, San Francisco^{[d]}	23 Darius Slay, Detroit; 20 Jalen Ramsey, LA Rams^{[b]}	23 Kyle Fuller, Chicago^{[a]} 26 Shaquill Griffin, Seattle^{[a]} 29 Xavier Rhodes, Minnesota^{[a]}
Free safety	32 Budda Baker, Arizona	39 Eddie Jackson, Chicago	
Strong safety	22 Harrison Smith, Minnesota		

=== Special teams ===
Position	Starter(s)	Alternate(s)
Punter	5 Tress Way, Washington	
Placekicker	3 Wil Lutz, New Orleans	
Return specialist	11 Deonte Harris, New Orleans	
Special teams	84 Cordarrelle Patterson, Chicago	
Long snapper	45 Rick Lovato, Philadelphia	

Notes: Players must have accepted their invitations as alternates to be listed; those who declined are not considered Pro Bowlers.

bold player who participated in game
(C) signifies the player has been selected as a captain
^{a} Replacement player selection due to injury or vacancy
^{b} Injured/suspended player; selected but did not participate
^{c} Replacement starter; selected as reserve
^{d} Selected but did not play because his team advanced to Super Bowl LIV (see Pro Bowl "Player Selection" section)
^{e} Selected but chose not to participate
^{f} Selected as starter, but relinquished that role

== Number of selections per team ==
American Football Conference
Team	Selections
Baltimore Ravens	13
Buffalo Bills	3
Cincinnati Bengals	1
Cleveland Browns	3
Denver Broncos	2
Houston Texans	3
Indianapolis Colts	4
Jacksonville Jaguars	3
Kansas City Chiefs	6
Oakland Raiders	2
Los Angeles Chargers	3
Miami Dolphins	0
New England Patriots	3
New York Jets	1
Pittsburgh Steelers	6
Tennessee Titans	4

National Football Conference
Team	Selections
Arizona Cardinals	2
Atlanta Falcons	3
Carolina Panthers	3
Chicago Bears	4
Dallas Cowboys	6
Detroit Lions	2
Green Bay Packers	5
Los Angeles Rams	2
Minnesota Vikings	8
New Orleans Saints	11
New York Giants	0
Philadelphia Eagles	6
San Francisco 49ers	4
Seattle Seahawks	3
Tampa Bay Buccaneers	3
Washington Redskins	2

== Broadcasting ==
The game was televised nationally by ESPN, while being simulcast on ABC and Disney XD, and in Spanish by ESPN Deportes.

Early in the first quarter, an ABC News special report (simulcast on ESPN, with Disney XD continuing on with game coverage) interrupted the game to announce the death of NBA legend Kobe Bryant in a helicopter crash earlier in the day; before the game, NFC players who learned of his death conducted a prayer led by Wilson, while various on-field tributes were made during the game. With coverage of Bryant's death becoming a certain and continuing theme of the game coverage, it was decided to end the Disney XD simulcast with nine minutes remaining in the second quarter and switch that network to an impromptu marathon of Big City Greens.
