= Brian Townsend (American football) =

American football player and college athletics administrator (born 1968)

No. 51
- Position: Linebacker

Personal information
- Born: November 7, 1968; Cincinnati, Ohio, U.S.
- Listed height: 6 ft 3 in (1.91 m)
- Listed weight: 242 lb (110 kg)

Career information
- High school: Northwest (Cincinnati)
- College: Michigan
- NFL draft: 1992: 11th round, 281st overall pick

Career history

Playing
- Los Angeles Rams (1992)*; Cincinnati Bengals (1992); Los Angeles Rams (1993)*
- * Offseason or practice squad member only

Coaching
- Ann Arbor Pioneer High School (1998–2003); Ohio University (2003–2007)

Operations
- University of Michigan (2007–2010) Director of basketball operations; University of Michigan (2010–2014) Assistant sport administrator; University of Michigan (2014–present) Director of student-athlete development
- Stats at Pro Football Reference

Brian Lewis Townsend (born November 7, 1968) is an American college athletics administrator and former professional football player. He is currently the director of student-athlete development at the University of Michigan. He played college football at Michigan from 1987 to 1991 and played professional football for the Cincinnati Bengals in 1992.

== Early life ==
Townsend was born in Cincinnati, Ohio, in 1968. He attended Cincinnati's Northwest High School.

== University of Michigan ==
Townsend enrolled at the University of Michigan in 1987 and played college football as a linebacker for the Michigan Wolverines football teams from 1988 to 1991. During his four years as a player for Michigan, Townsend had 70 tackles and 23 assists. After winning four straight Big Ten titles, he helped lead the Maize and Blue to four straight Bowl appearances. In 2000, the Wolverine Magazine named Townsend to its Michigan Football All-Decade Team.

== Professional football ==
Townsend was drafted by the Los Angeles Rams in the 11th round (281st overall pick) of the 1992 NFL draft. He appeared in three games as a linebacker for the Cincinnati Bengals during the 1992 NFL season.

== Coaching and administration ==
After retiring from football, Townsend was hired as an assistant basketball coach at Northwest High School in Cincinnati. From 1998 to 2003, Townsend was the boys' basketball coach at Ann Arbor's Pioneer High School. His 1999 team won the Class A State Championship title, the first one in school history, and Townsend compiled a record of 109–36 in six years as head coach.

From 2003 to 2007, he was an assistant basketball coach at Ohio University. In each of his last three seasons, his teams won 19 or more games. During the 2004–2005 season, his team compiled a 21–11 record and appeared in the NCAA Tournament for the first time in 11 years.

In 2007, Townsend was hired as the Director of Basketball Operations for the University of Michigan. While Director of Basketball Operations, Townsend helped oversee the resurgence of Michigan basketball onto the national stage under head coach John Beilein. Townsend was a part of a staff that led Michigan to the 2009 NCAA Tournament, its first appearance since 1995. In 2010, he was promoted to Assistant Sport Administrator for football, men's basketball, and hockey. In this role, Townsend worked directly with the Athletic Director in the oversight and administration of the three sports.

In 2014, Townsend transitioned to the role of Director of Student-Athlete Development. In that position, he is responsible for developing and implementing comprehensive student-athlete programming and services. The goals of that programming and services are focused on lifelong health and wellness, as well as personal growth and development.
