= Josh Hines-Allen =

American football player (born 1997)

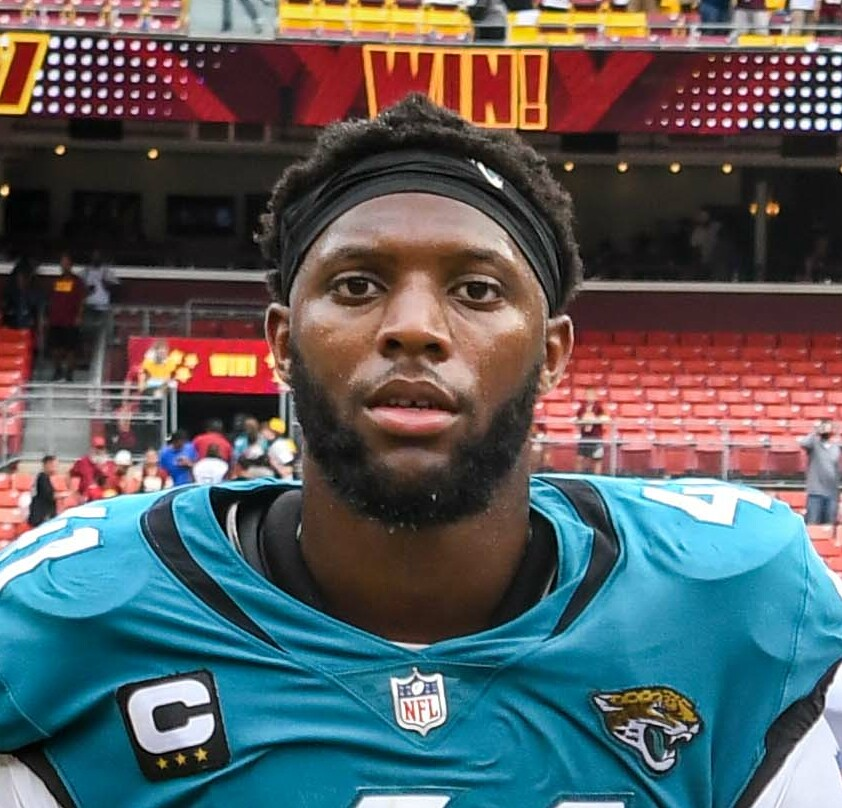
- Hines-Allen with the Jacksonville Jaguars in 2022

No. 41 – Jacksonville Jaguars
- Position: Defensive end
- Roster status: Active

Personal information
- Born: July 13, 1997 (age 29); Cumberland, Virginia, U.S.
- Listed height: 6 ft 5 in (1.96 m)
- Listed weight: 255 lb (116 kg)

Career information
- High school: Montclair (Montclair, New Jersey)
- College: Kentucky (2015–2018)
- NFL draft: 2019: 1st round, 7th overall pick

Career history
- Jacksonville Jaguars (2019–present)

Awards and highlights
- 2× Pro Bowl (2019, 2023); PFWA All-Rookie Team (2019); Chuck Bednarik Award (2018); Lott Trophy (2018); Bronko Nagurski Trophy (2018); Jack Lambert Trophy (2018); SEC Defensive Player of the Year (2018); Unanimous All-American (2018); First-team All-SEC (2018); Second-team All-SEC (2017)

Career NFL statistics as of Week 7, 2025
- Total tackles: 365
- Sacks: 62.5
- Forced fumbles: 11
- Fumble recoveries: 5
- Pass deflections: 14
- Interceptions: 2
- Defensive touchdowns: 1
- Stats at Pro Football Reference

Joshua Hines-Allen (born Joshua Allen, July 13, 1997) is an American professional football defensive end for the Jacksonville Jaguars of the National Football League (NFL). He played college football for the Kentucky Wildcats, winning the Chuck Bednarik Award and Bronko Nagurski Trophy in 2018. Hines-Allen was selected seventh overall by the Jaguars in the 2019 NFL draft and has received two Pro Bowl selections with the team.

== Early life ==
Hines-Allen was born on July 13, 1997, to Kim and Robert Allen in Cumberland County, Virginia. He has a twin brother, Isaiah, and four older sisters. Due to a stutter, he spent part of his studies in New Jersey's special education system. Hines-Allen then went to live with his relatives in Alabama, attending Abbeville High School. He was later diagnosed with ADHD.

Although Hines-Allen grew up playing basketball, his uncle convinced him to try out for the high school football team. In his freshman year, he did not play a single snap in a game. In his sophomore year, he started as a varsity receiver, and in his junior year, he was an all-state receiver with 1,150 yards and 11 touchdowns. Hines-Allen decided to return to New Jersey for his senior year, attending Montclair High School. He switched position from receiver to defensive end, affecting his recruiting opportunities. During his sole season with the Mounties, Hines-Allen led the state in sacks that year and recorded a touchdown catch, as the team finished 11–1 and won the 2014 state title (after losing their first and only game of the season to Pascack Valley). After high school, Hines-Allen first committed to Monmouth, but later received an offer from Kentucky.

=== Recruitment ===
Despite Hines-Allen leading New Jersey in sacks as a senior, he was still very much under the recruiting radar. Four highly rated recruits who went on to become NFL players—Jabrill Peppers, Quenton Nelson, David Njoku, and Mike Gesicki—were fellow high school seniors in New Jersey. The recruiting website 247Sports rated Hines-Allen as a two-star prospect (out of a possible five), and ranked more than 2,000 players in the 2015 recruiting class ahead of him. John Fiore, at the time head coach at Montclair High, actively tried to get Rutgers to evaluate him, but the coaching staff there showed no interest. In a 2019 ESPN story on Hines-Allen, Fiore said about Rutgers' lack of interest, "Some people just couldn't see the potential in him. Kentucky did, and they won big. I told Rutgers, 'You guys are going to look foolish when he's drafted in the first round.'" In fact, when Hines-Allen made his verbal commitment to Monmouth, no Football Bowl Subdivision (FBS) school had offered him a scholarship, and no other NCAA Division I school, whether FBS or FCS, had made him an offer.

Hines-Allen's journey to Kentucky began with West Orange High School head coach Jim Matsakis, whose team had faced Montclair High in his senior year. Matsakis made a phone call to his brother Louie, who was then on the Wildcats coaching staff. Louie first contacted D. J. Eliot, then Kentucky's outside linebackers coach, who in turn contacted the then-defensive backs coach Derrick Ansley while the latter was on a recruiting trip in the Washington metropolitan area. Eliot told Ansley to detour to New Jersey to meet with Hines-Allen and arrange for an immediate campus visit if he was at least 6'4". While he had verbally committed to Monmouth, Hines-Allen was still available for recruitment because he had yet to sign a letter of intent. Hines-Allen visited Kentucky and signed with the Wildcats three days later.

== College career ==
Following his junior season in which he had 7 sacks and 10.5 tackles for loss, Hines-Allen was named to the Associated Press Second-team and the All-Southeastern Conference (SEC) team. After this season, Hines-Allen considered forgoing his senior year and declaring for the 2018 NFL draft. He later decided to return to Kentucky for his senior season. He also dropped into coverage on 141 snaps and allowed just 130 yards on 19 targets without allowing a touchdown. Hines-Allen was a unanimous All-American, won the Chuck Bednarik Award, the Bronko Nagurski Trophy, and was named the SEC Defensive Player of the Year. Allen finished his career as Kentucky's all-time sack leader with 31.5.

== Professional career ==
Pre-draft measurables
Height	Weight	Arm length	Hand span	Wingspan	40-yard dash	10-yard split	20-yard split	20-yard shuttle	Three-cone drill	Broad jump	Bench press	Wonderlic
6 ft 4 7/8 in (1.95 m)	262 lb (119 kg)	33 1/2 in (0.85 m)	8 3/4 in (0.22 m)	6 ft 8 1/2 in (2.04 m)	4.63 s	1.57 s	2.70 s	4.23 s	7.15 s	9 ft 10 in (3.00 m)	28 reps	15
All values from NFL Combine

=== 2019 ===
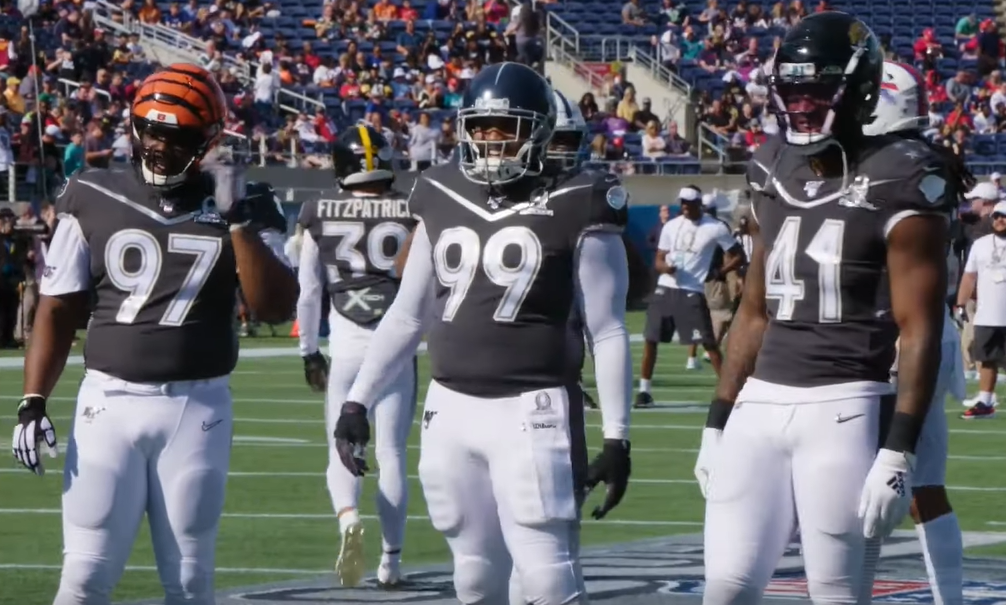
Hines-Allen (right) alongside Jurrell Casey (center) and Geno Atkins (left) at the 2020 Pro Bowl

Hines-Allen was selected by the Jacksonville Jaguars with the seventh overall pick in the first round of the 2019 NFL draft. On May 23, 2019, Hines-Allen signed his four-year rookie contract, worth a fully guaranteed $21.8 million, including a $14.6 million signing bonus.

During Week 3 against the Tennessee Titans, Hines-Allen recorded his first two career sacks on Marcus Mariota as the Jaguars won 20–7. Two weeks later against the Carolina Panthers, he sacked Kyle Allen once in the 34–27 road loss. During Week 8 against the New York Jets, Hines-Allen sacked Sam Darnold twice in the 29–15 win.

Hines-Allen finished the season with a team-leading (and franchise rookie record-setting) 10.5 sacks, 44 tackles, and two forced fumbles. Following the AFC Championship Game, he was selected as a Pro Bowl alternate for defensive end Frank Clark. As a result, Hines-Allen became the first Jaguars player in history to be selected to the Pro Bowl in their rookie season. He was named to the PFWA All-Rookie Team.

=== 2020 ===
In Week 3 against the Miami Dolphins on Thursday Night Football, Hines-Allen recorded his first sack of the season during the 31–13 loss. On November 24, 2020, Allen was placed on injured reserve with a knee injury.

=== 2021 ===
In Week 9 against the Buffalo Bills, Hines-Allen helped lead the Jaguars to a 9–6 upset with a career game. Hines-Allen had eight tackles, a sack, an interception, and a fumble recovery on Bills quarterback Josh Allen. Hines-Allen was known as Josh Allen at the time and became the first player in NFL history to record a sack, interception, and a fumble recovery from a quarterback with the same name.

=== 2022 ===
The Jaguars picked up the fifth-year option on Hines-Allen's contract on April 28, 2022.

In the team's final regular-season game, Hines-Allen scored the game-winning touchdown on a fumble recovery against the Titans, securing the Jaguars their first division title and playoff berth since 2017. He was named AFC Defensive Player Of The Week for his performance.

=== 2023 ===
In Week 1, Hines-Allen started the year with three sacks against the Indianapolis Colts, helping secure a 31–21 win for the Jaguars. In Week 12, Hines-Allen recorded 2.5 sacks, five tackles, including two for a loss in a 24–21 win over the Houston Texans, earning AFC Defensive Player of the Week.

Hines-Allen finished the season with 17.5 sacks, a career-high and franchise record for most sacks in a season, and was named to the 2024 Pro Bowl.

=== 2024 ===
On March 5, 2024, the Jaguars placed the franchise tag on Hines-Allen. On April 10, 2024, the Jaguars signed Hines-Allen to a five-year extension worth $150 million, including $88 million guaranteed. After playing the last two seasons as an outside linebacker in a 3–4 defense, Hines-Allen switched back to defensive end after new defensive coordinator, Ryan Nielsen, implemented a 4–3 scheme.

=== 2025 ===
On November 15, 2025, Hines-Allen sacked Chargers quarterback Justin Herbert to record his 56th career sack, breaking the Jaguars franchise record previously held by defensive end Tony Brackens, who had 55 sacks.

== Career statistics ==
Legend
	Led the league
**Bold**	Career high

=== NFL ===
==== Regular season ====
Year	Team	Games		Tackles						Interceptions						Fumbles				
Year	Team	GP	GS	Cmb	Solo	Ast	TFL	Sck	Sfty	PD	Int	Yds	Y/I	Lng	TD	FF	FR	Yds	Y/R	TD
2019	JAX	16	4	44	31	13	11	10.5	0	0	0	—	—	—	—	2	0	—	—	—
2020	JAX	8	7	13	7	6	2	2.5	0	1	0	—	—	—	—	0	0	—	—	—
2021	JAX	16	15	**71**	**46**	**25**	12	7.5	0	**4**	**1**	**11**	**11.0**	**11**	0	1	1	0	0.0	0
2022	JAX	17	17	57	35	22	11	7.0	0	2	0	—	—	—	—	**4**	**2**	**38**	**19.0**	**1**
2023	JAX	17	17	66	43	23	**17**	**17.5**	0	1	**1**	8	8.0	8	0	2	0	—	—	—
2024	JAX	16	16	45	26	19	10	8.0	0	2	0	—	—	—	—	1	1	13	13.0	0
2025	JAX	17	17	49	28	21	12	8.0	**1**	3	0	—	—	—	—	0	0	—	—	—
2026	JAX	6	6	20	10	10	3	1.5	0	1	0	—	—	—	—	1	1	—	—	—
Career		113	99	365	226	139	78	62.5	1	14	2	19	9.5	11	0	11	5	51	12.8	1

==== Postseason ====
Year	Team	Games		Tackles						Interceptions						Fumbles				
Year	Team	GP	GS	Cmb	Solo	Ast	TFL	Sck	Sfty	PD	Int	Yds	Y/I	Lng	TD	FF	FR	Yds	Y/R	TD
2022	JAX	2	2	**11**	**4**	**7**	**1**	**1.0**	0	0	0	—	—	—	—	0	0	—	—	—
2025	JAX	1	1	4	3	1	**1**	**1.0**	0	0	0	—	—	—	—	0	0	—	—	—
Career		3	3	15	7	8	2	2.0	0	0	0	—	—	—	—	0	0	—	—	—

=== College ===
Year	Team	GP	Tackles					Interceptions					Fumbles			
Year	Team	GP	Solo	Ast	Total	Loss	Sack	Int	Yds	Avg	TD	PD	FR	Yds	TD	FF
2015	Kentucky	3	1	3	4	1.5	0.5	0	0	0	0	1	0	0	0	0
2016	Kentucky	13	32	30	62	8.5	7.0	0	0	0	0	0	0	0	0	4
2017	Kentucky	13	32	**34**	66	10.5	7.0	**1**	**14**	**14**	0	3	0	0	0	2
2018	Kentucky	13	**56**	32	**88**	**21.5**	**17.0**	0	0	0	0	**4**	**2**	0	0	**5**

== Career highlights ==
=== Awards and honors ===
NFL

- 2× Pro Bowl (2019, 2023)
- PFWA All-Rookie Team (2019)
- Ranked No. 35 in the Top 100 Players of 2024
- Ranked No. 63 in the Top 100 Players of 2025
- Ranked No. 48 in the Top 100 Players of 2026

College

- Chuck Bednarik Award (2018)
- Lott Trophy (2018)
- Bronko Nagurski Trophy (2018)
- Jack Lambert Trophy (2018)
- SEC Defensive Player of the Year (2018)
- Unanimous All-American (2018)
- First-team All-SEC (2018)
- Second-team All-SEC (2017)

=== Jaguars franchise records ===
- Most sacks by a rookie in a season: 10.5 (2019)
- First rookie to be named to the Pro Bowl (2019)
- Most sacks in a season: 17.5 (2023)
- Most career sacks: 60

== Personal life ==
One of his sisters, Myisha Hines-Allen, is a professional basketball player for the Indiana Fever. Two other sisters played basketball, LaTorri Hines-Allen for Division I Towson, and Kyra Hines-Allen for Division II Cheyney. An uncle, Gregory Hines, was a legendary player for Hampton basketball when the Pirates were still in Division II. He was later chosen in the fifth round of the 1983 NBA draft; although he never played in the league, he did play professionally for over a decade. Another uncle, Keith, played basketball at Montclair State.

Hines-Allen married Kaitlyn Morrison on April 17, 2019. The two met during their freshman year of college in 2015 at the University of Kentucky. Kaitlyn is from Ohio and has a license in Cosmetology, as well as attending college for psychology. Hines-Allen has three children with his wife: Wesley, Julian, and Vanessa.

On July 9, 2024, he officially announced a name change from Joshua Allen to Joshua Hines-Allen, in honor of his sisters and uncles, who were all athletes.
