= D. J. Chark =

American football player (born 1996)

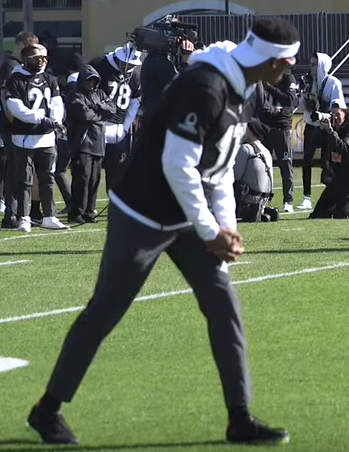
- Chark at the 2020 Pro Bowl

No. 17, 4, 9
- Position: Wide receiver

Personal information
- Born: September 23, 1996 (age 30); Alexandria, Louisiana, U.S.
- Listed height: 6 ft 3 in (1.91 m)
- Listed weight: 198 lb (90 kg)

Career information
- High school: Alexandria
- College: LSU (2014–2017)
- NFL draft: 2018: 2nd round, 61st overall pick

Career history
- Jacksonville Jaguars (2018–2021); Detroit Lions (2022); Carolina Panthers (2023); Los Angeles Chargers (2024); Atlanta Falcons (2025)*
- * Offseason or practice squad member only

Awards and highlights
- Pro Bowl (2019)

Career NFL statistics
- Receptions: 216
- Receiving yards: 3,100
- Receiving touchdowns: 24
- Stats at Pro Football Reference

Darrell Demont "D. J." Chark Jr. (born September 23, 1996) is an American former professional football player who was a wide receiver in the National Football League (NFL). He played college football for the LSU Tigers and was selected by the Jacksonville Jaguars in the second round of the 2018 NFL draft.

== Early life ==
Chark was born to Shirley and Darrell Chark on September 23, 1996. He played for a youth league as a running back in his hometown. He attended Alexandria Senior High School in Alexandria, Louisiana, where played high school football and ran track.

== College career ==
Chark had offers from schools such as Memphis, Oklahoma State, Texas A&M, among others. He chose to commit to Louisiana State University (LSU) to play college football. Chark played at LSU from 2014 to 2017 under head coaches Les Miles and Ed Orgeron. After not recording a reception his first two years, he had 26 for 466 yards and three touchdowns as a junior in 2016. As a senior in 2017, he had 40 receptions for 874 yards and three touchdowns. Known for his straight-ahead speed, Chark earned the nickname "The Flash" during his time at LSU. He wore number 7 at LSU.

== Professional career ==
=== Pre-draft ===
On December 18, 2017, it was announced that Chark had accepted his invitation to play in the 2018 Senior Bowl. On January 27, 2018, Chark played in the 2018 Reese's Senior Bowl and made two tackles and caught five passes for 160 receiving yards and a touchdown as part of Houston Texans head coach Bill O'Brien's South team that defeated the North 45–16. He led both teams in receiving yards and earned the Senior Bowl's co-MVP award. Chark's Senior Bowl performance immediately garnered him recognition as a top wide receiver prospect in the upcoming draft and he was widely praised among analysts, including Charles Davis and James Jones.

External videos
- Senior Bowl: D.J. Chark catches 75-yard TD
- Senior Bowl: D.J. Chark catches 63-yard TD
- Top 5 D.J. Chark Reese's Senior Bowl plays

He attended the NFL Scouting Combine in Indianapolis and completed all of the combine and positional drills. His draft stock continued to rise after he tied for fourth among all players in the 40-yard dash, tied for ninth in the vertical jump, and tied for 13th in the broad jump. Chark also attended a private workout for the Dallas Cowboys and pre-draft visits with the Buffalo Bills and Denver Broncos. At the conclusion of the pre-draft process, Chark was projected to be a second round pick by NFL draft experts and scouts. He was ranked the fifth best wide receiver prospect in the draft by DraftScout.com, was ranked the sixth best wide receiver by Scouts Inc., and was ranked tenth best wide receiver by Sports Illustrated.

External videos
- D.J. Chark's NFL Scouting Combine
- D.J. Chark runs 4.34 in the 40-yard dash
- D.J. Chark records 10'9" broad jump

Pre-draft measurables
Height	Weight	Arm length	Hand span	Wingspan	40-yard dash	10-yard split	20-yard split	Vertical jump	Broad jump	Bench press
6 ft 2 7/8 in (1.90 m)	199 lb (90 kg)	32 3/8 in (0.82 m)	9 1/4 in (0.23 m)	6 ft 7 in (2.01 m)	4.34 s	1.51 s	2.54 s	40 in (1.02 m)	10 ft 9 in (3.28 m)	16 reps
All values from NFL Combine/LSU's Pro Day

=== Jacksonville Jaguars ===
The Jacksonville Jaguars selected Chark in the second round with the 61st overall pick in the 2018 NFL draft. Chark was the eighth wide receiver drafted in 2018. On May 25, 2018, the Jaguars signed him to a four-year, $4.44 million contract that includes a signing bonus of $1.31 million. In the Jaguars' Week 2 victory over the New England Patriots, Chark recorded his first professional reception, which went for 13 yards. However, he did lose the ball on a fumble on the same play. Chark finished his rookie year with 14 receptions for 174 receiving yards. He was also the Jaguars primary kick returner.

External videos
- Jaguars draft D.J. Chark 61st overall
- Instant Draft Grade: D.J. Chark

During Week 1 of the 2019 season against the Kansas City Chiefs, Chark caught four passes for 146 yards and a touchdown as the Jaguars lost 40–26, the best yards-per-reception in a game by a Jaguar. In Week 2 against the Houston Texans, Chark caught seven passes for 55 yards and one touchdown as the Jaguars lost 13–12. In Week 3 against the Tennessee Titans, Chark caught four passes for 76 yards and his third receiving touchdown of the season in the 20–7 win. In Week 5 against the Carolina Panthers, Chark caught eight passes for 164 yards (#8 in franchise history) and two touchdowns in the 34–27 loss. In Week 11 against the Indianapolis Colts, Chark caught eight passes for 104 yards and two touchdowns in the 33–13 loss. Overall, Chark finished the 2019 season with 73 receptions for 1,008 receiving yards (the fifth Jaguar to reach 1,000 receiving yards in franchise history) and eight receiving touchdowns and a two-point conversion, leading the team in scoring by a non-kicker. He was named to the 2020 Pro Bowl as a replacement for Tyreek Hill.

In Week 4 of the 2020 season against the Cincinnati Bengals, Chark caught eight passes for 95 receiving yards and two receiving touchdowns during the 33–25 loss. In Week 9 against the Texans, Chark had seven receptions for 146 receiving yards, including a 73-yard receiving touchdown, in the 27–25 loss. He finished the 2020 season with 53 receptions for 706 receiving yards and five receiving touchdowns.

On August 8, 2021, it was revealed that Chark had surgery to repair a broken finger. The injury was not as serious as Chark was expected to be ready by the start of the season. Chark suffered a fractured ankle during the Jaguars Week 4 game against the Cincinnati Bengals in the first quarter in the 24–21 loss. He was placed on injured reserve on October 4, 2021. He played in four games and totaled seven receptions for 154 yards and two touchdowns in the 2021 season. At the time of his trade, he was in the top 10 in Jaguars franchise history in receiving touchdowns (#7t), yards per reception (#5), and 100-yard games (#7t).

=== Detroit Lions ===
On March 17, 2022, Chark signed a one-year, $10 million contract with the Detroit Lions. He suffered an ankle injury in Week 3 and missed the next two games before being placed on injured reserve on October 22, 2022. He was activated on November 19. The week after recording a touchdown in Week 12 against Bills, in Chark's third game back he had five receptions for 98 yards in a blowout of his former team, the Jaguars. The following week, he had 94 yards and a touchdown in a win over the Minnesota Vikings. In the season finale, Chark had just three receptions for 14 yards, but two were critical 4th-down conversions to set up the game winning touchdown, and kill the clock to eliminate the rival Green Bay Packers from the playoffs. On the season, Chark's 502 yards in the 11 games he played were third-best for the 9–8 Lions, behind Amon-Ra St. Brown and Kalif Raymond.

=== Carolina Panthers ===
On March 24, 2023, Chark signed with the Carolina Panthers on a one-year deal. In week 16 against the Green Bay Packers, Chark had his best showing of the season recording 6 catches for 98 yards and two touchdowns from Bryce Young in a 33–30 loss. He finished the 2023 season with 35 receptions for 525 yards and five touchdowns.

=== Los Angeles Chargers ===
On May 6, 2024, Chark signed a one-year contract with the Los Angeles Chargers. He was placed on injured reserve on September 7 with a hip injury. He was activated on November 2. He appeared in seven games on the season. He had one touchdown, which came against the Raiders in Week 18.

=== Atlanta Falcons ===
On July 25, 2025, Chark signed a one-year contract with the Atlanta Falcons. He was released by the Falcons on August 18.

On March 20, 2026, Chark announced his retirement from the NFL after seven seasons.

== Career statistics ==
=== NFL ===
Regular season
Year	Team	Games		Receiving					Rushing					Fumbles	
Year	Team	GP	GS	Rec	Yds	Avg	Lng	TD	Att	Yds	Avg	Lng	TD	Fum	Lost
2018	JAX	11	0	14	174	12.4	38	0	0	0	0.0	0	0	1	1
2019	JAX	15	14	73	1,008	13.8	69	8	2	20	10.0	20	0	0	0
2020	JAX	13	12	53	706	13.3	73	5	0	0	0.0	0	0	0	0
2021	JAX	4	4	7	154	22.0	41	2	0	0	0.0	0	0	0	0
2022	DET	11	10	30	502	16.7	51	3	0	0	0.0	0	0	0	0
2023	CAR	15	11	35	525	15.0	47	5	0	0	0.0	0	0	2	1
2024	LAC	7	0	4	31	7.8	12	1	0	0	0.0	0	0	0	0
Career		76	51	216	3,100	14.4	73	24	2	20	10.0	20	0	3	2

=== College ===
Season	Team	GP	Receiving					Rushing					Punt returns				
Season	Team	GP	Rec	Yds	Avg	Lng	TD	Att	Yds	Avg	Lng	TD	Att	Yds	Avg	Lng	TD
2014	LSU	6	0	0	0.0	0	0	0	0	0.0	0	0	0	0	0.0	0	0
2015	LSU	5	0	0	0.0	0	0	2	86	43.0	79	1	0	0	0.0	0	0
2016	LSU	12	26	466	17.9	80	3	12	122	10.2	53	2	0	0	0.0	0	0
2017	LSU	12	40	874	21.9	68	3	12	63	5.3	20	1	18	190	10.6	75	2
Career		35	66	1,340	20.3	80	6	26	271	10.4	79	4	18	190	10.6	75	2
