= Preston Brown (linebacker) =

American football player (born 1992)

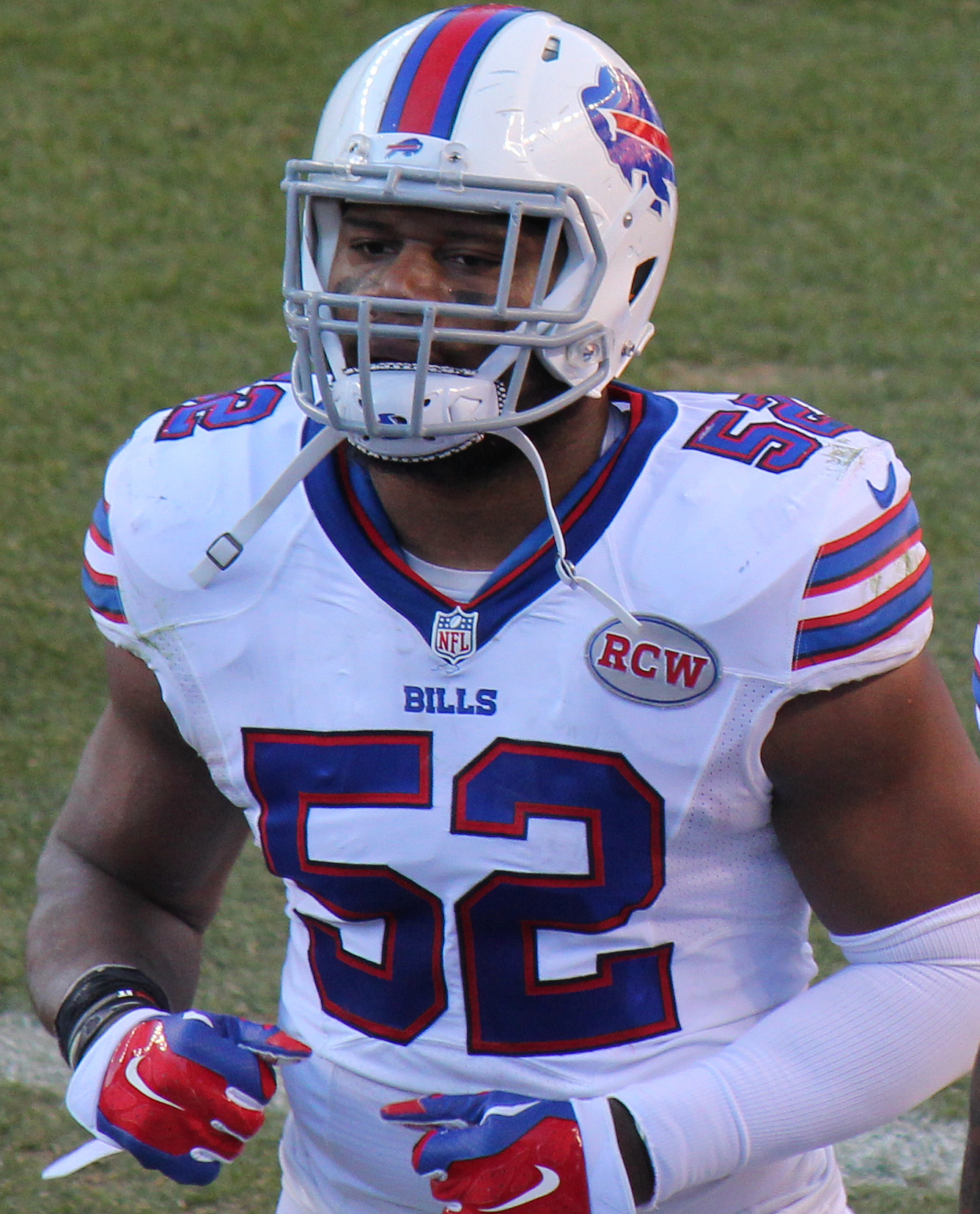
- Brown with the Buffalo Bills in 2014

No. 52, 54
- Position: Linebacker

Personal information
- Born: October 27, 1992 (age 34); Cincinnati, Ohio, U.S.
- Listed height: 6 ft 1 in (1.85 m)
- Listed weight: 251 lb (114 kg)

Career information
- High school: Northwest (Cincinnati)
- College: Louisville (2010–2013)
- NFL draft: 2014: 3rd round, 73rd overall pick

Career history
- Buffalo Bills (2014–2017); Cincinnati Bengals (2018–2019); Oakland Raiders (2019); Jacksonville Jaguars (2019)

Awards and highlights
- NFL tackles co-leader (2017); Second-team All-AAC (2013); Second-team All-Big East (2012)

Career NFL statistics
- Total tackles: 609
- Sacks: 1.0
- Forced fumbles: 3
- Fumble recoveries: 5
- Interceptions: 5
- Defensive touchdowns: 1
- Stats at Pro Football Reference

Michael Preston Brown (born October 27, 1992) is an American former professional football player who was a linebacker in the National Football League (NFL). He was selected by the Buffalo Bills in the third round of the 2014 NFL draft. He played college football for the Louisville Cardinals.

== Early life ==
Brown attended Northwest High School where he was a running back and linebacker. He earned first-team All-District honors and was selected to play in the North-South All-Star game.

Considered a three-star recruit by Rivals.com, he was rated as the 75th best outside linebacker prospect of his class. He originally committed to the Cincinnati, but switched his commitment to Louisville.

== College career ==
=== 2010 season ===
Brown recorded one tackle in his collegiate debut versus Kentucky and recorded his first tackle for loss against Memphis. Also had one tackle in the bowl win over Southern Mississippi. He appeared in all 13 games at linebacker and on special teams and totaled 10 tackles in 13 games.

=== 2011 season ===
Brown appeared in all 13 games making 11 starts. He set a career-high with 12 tackles in season-opener versus Murray State. Brown recorded first sack of his college career versus Syracuse. Named Big East Conference Defensive Player of the Week on Oct. 31. He finished tied for second on the team with 84 tackles total.

=== 2012 season ===
Brown took over from Dexter Heyman as middle linebacker. He had a breakout season as a junior in 2012. In the season opener against Kentucky he would finish with 6 tackles. Over the next 5 games he would record 13 total tackles, however he did not play in two of those games. In the next game against South Florida Brown would set a career-high with 17 total tackles. Against his home town Cincinnati Bearcats he was a huge factor on defense in an overtime win with 13 total tackles and an interception. For his effort against South Florida and Cincinnati he would win his second Big East player of the week of his career. In that week he recorded 30 total tackles and an interception. In a win against Temple he would have 10 tackles. In losses against Syracuse and Uconn Brown had 10 and 12 tackles, respectively. In the regular season finale, Brown would total 6 tackles in a win against Rutgers. He ended the regular season with 87 total tackles, a career-high. Brown was key in getting Louisville to the Sugar Bowl. Louisville would upset Florida in the Allstate Sugar Bowl. Brown recorded 13 total tackles and was a key part of the upset win.

=== 2013 season ===
Brown returned to Louisville for his senior season. He would lead the team in tackles with 98 total tackles, 71 of them being solo, 14 tackles-for-loss, and also recorded 5 sacks. Brown forced 3 total fumbles and recovered 2 of the 3, one of which he scored his first touchdown on, returning it 48 yards against Memphis. His score would be the winning touchdown as Louisville won 24–17. Louisville ended their season playing Miami in the Russell Athletic Bowl. Brown recorded 7 tackles and 1 sack in this game as the cardinals won 36–9. Brown played in the 2014 East–West Shrine Game and registered 2.5 total tackles.

In Brown's four years at Louisville, he played in 52 games. He recorded 301 total tackles, 178 solo, seven sacks, 26 tackles for loss, two fumble recoveries out of three forced; one of which was returned 48 yards for a touchdown, and one 1 interception.

== Professional career ==
=== Pre-draft ===
Brown was rated the fourth best inside linebacker prospect, and was projected to be drafted in the third-to-fourth round by NFLDraftScout.com.

External videos
- Preston Browns' NFL Combine Workout

Pre-draft measurables
Height	Weight	Arm length	Hand span	40-yard dash	10-yard split	20-yard split	20-yard shuttle	Three-cone drill	Vertical jump	Broad jump	Bench press
6 ft 1 1/4 in (1.86 m)	251 lb (114 kg)	33 1/2 in (0.85 m)	10 1/4 in (0.26 m)	4.86 s	1.72 s	2.85 s	4.26 s	6.98 s	33.0 in (0.84 m)	9 ft 8 in (2.95 m)	23 reps
All values from NFL Combine

=== Buffalo Bills ===
==== 2014 ====
The Buffalo Bills selected Brown in the third round (73rd overall) of the 2014 NFL draft. He was the tenth linebacker drafted in 2014.

On May 14, 2014, the Bills signed Brown to a four-year, [$3 million contract that included a signing bonus of $648,000.

Throughout training camp, Brown competed for a role as a backup outside linebacker against Nigel Bradham. On July 2, 2014, it was reported that starting weakside linebacker Kiko Alonso was expected to miss the entire season after tearing his ACL. Defensive coordinator Jim Schwartz held an open competition to between Brown and Bradham to name a new starter. Head coach Doug Marrone named Brown the backup weakside linebacker to begin the season, behind Bradham.

He made his professional regular season debut and first career start in the Bills' season-opener at the Chicago Bears and recorded seven combined tackles in their 23–20 victory. He earned the start in place of Bradham, who was suspended for their season-opener after violating the league's policy and program for substances of abuse. The following week, he started in place of Keith Rivers after he was inactive due to a groin injury he sustained in the season-opener. Brown collected a season-high 13 combined tackles (seven solo) during a 29–10 victory against the Miami Dolphins in Week 2. Prior to Week 7, Brown supplanted Rivers as the starting strongside linebacker and remained as the starter for the last ten games of the season. On October 26, 2014, Brown recorded nine combined tackles, a pass deflection, and made his first career interception during a 43–23 win at the New York Jets in Week 8. He intercepted a pass by quarterback Geno Smith that was originally intended for tight end Jeff Cumberland and returned it for no gain. He finished his rookie season in 2014 with 109 combined tackles (66 solo), two pass deflections, and an interception in 16 games and 14 starts. His 109 tackles were the most of any Bills' player in 2014.

==== 2015 ====
On January 1, 2015, it was announced that Marrone opted to exercise a clause in his contract and resign from his role after finishing with a 9–7 record in 2014. Brown entered training camp slated as the starting inside linebacker along with Nigel Bradham. Head coach Rex Ryan officially named Brown and Bradham the starting inside linebacker to begin the regular season.

In Week 2, Brown recorded a season-high 12 combined tackles (seven solo) during a 40–32 loss to the New England Patriots. On September 27, 2015, Brown made seven combined tackles, two pass deflections, two interceptions, and a touchdown in the Bills' 41–14 win at the Dolphins in Week 3. He returned an interception by quarterback Ryan Tannehill for a 43-yard touchdown in the second quarter to mark the first score of his career. He finished his second season with 120 combined tackles (66 solo), four pass deflections, two interceptions, a forced fumble, and a touchdown in 16 games and 16 starts.

==== 2016 ====
Ryan named Brown and Zach Brown the starting inside linebackers to start the regular season, alongside outside linebackers Jerry Hughes and Lorenzo Alexander. In Week 2, Brown collected a season-high 16 combined tackles (seven solo) in the Bills' 37–31 loss to the Jets. On October 30, 2016, Brown recorded eight combined tackles and made his first career sack on quarterback Tom Brady during a 31–25 loss to the Patriots in Week 8. In Week 16, he collected 14 combined tackles (eight solo) in a 34–31 loss to the Dolphins. The following week, Brown made 14 combined tackles (five solo) during a 30–10 loss at the Jets in Week 17. It marked Browns' fifth game of the season with 11 of more combined tackles. He finished the 2016 season with 139 combined tackles (79 solo), a pass deflection, and a sack in 16 games and 16 starts. On December 27, 2016, the Bills fired head coach Ryan after the Bills finished with a 7–9 record.

==== 2017 ====
Throughout training camp, Brown competed against Reggie Ragland to be the starting middle linebacker after defensive coordinator Leslie Frazier opted to switch to a base 4-3 defense. Head coach Sean McDermott named Brown the starting middle linebacker to start the regular season, along with outside linebackers Lorenzo Alexander and Ramon Humber.

On November 19, 2017, Brown collected 13 combined tackles (11 solo) in the Bills' 54–24 loss at the Los Angeles Chargers in Week 11. In Week 16, he recorded a season-high 15 combined tackles (ten solo) during a 37–16 loss at the Patriots. The following week, Brown made 12 combined tackles (eight solo) in the Bills' 22–16 victory at the Dolphins in Week 17. He finished his last season with the Bills with a career-high 144 combined tackles (84 solo) and three pass deflections in 16 games and 16 starts. His 144 tackles tied for most in the league with linebackers Blake Martinez and Joe Schobert. Pro Football Focus gave Brown an overall grade of 71.6, which ranked 42nd among all qualifying linebackers in 2017.

The Bills finished second in the AFC East with a 9–7 record. On January 7, 2018, Brown started in his first career playoff game and recorded six combined tackles in the Bills' 10–3 loss against the Jacksonville Jaguars in the AFC Wildcard Game.

=== Cincinnati Bengals ===
On March 16, 2018, the Cincinnati Bengals signed Brown to a one-year, $4 million contract with a $2 million signing bonus. He started seven games before being placed on injured reserve on November 20, 2018, with a knee injury.

On March 13, 2019, Brown signed a three-year contract extension with the Bengals worth $16.5 million. In week 2 against the San Francisco 49ers, Brown recorded a team high 14 tackles as the Bengals lost 41–17. On November 12, 2019, Brown was waived by the Bengals.

=== Oakland Raiders ===
On November 18, 2019, Brown was signed by the Oakland Raiders. He was released on December 10, 2019.

=== Jacksonville Jaguars ===
On December 11, 2019, Brown was claimed off waivers by the Jaguars.

== NFL career statistics ==
Legend
	Led the league
**Bold**	Career high

=== Regular season ===
Year	Team	Games		Tackles					Interceptions					Fumbles			
Year	Team	GP	GS	Cmb	Solo	Ast	Sck	TFL	Int	Yds	TD	Lng	PD	FF	FR	Yds	TD
2014	BUF	**16**	14	109	66	43	0.0	6	1	0	0	0	2	0	1	**30**	0
2015	BUF	**16**	**16**	120	66	54	0.0	3	**2**	**46**	**1**	**43**	**4**	**1**	1	0	0
2016	BUF	**16**	**16**	139	79	**60**	**1.0**	5	0	0	0	0	1	**1**	**2**	0	0
2017	BUF	**16**	**16**	**144**	**84**	**60**	0.0	**7**	0	0	0	0	3	0	0	0	0
2018	CIN	7	7	42	27	15	0.0	0	**2**	20	0	18	**4**	0	0	0	0
2019	CIN	9	8	54	27	27	0.0	0	0	0	0	0	0	**1**	1	0	0
2019	OAK	1	0	1	1	0	0.0	0	0	0	0	0	0	0	0	0	0
		81	77	609	350	259	1.0	21	5	66	1	43	14	3	5	30	0

=== Playoffs ===
Year	Team	Games		Tackles					Interceptions					Fumbles			
Year	Team	GP	GS	Cmb	Solo	Ast	Sck	TFL	Int	Yds	TD	Lng	PD	FF	FR	Yds	TD
2017	BUF	**1**	**1**	**6**	**4**	**2**	0.0	**2**	0	0	0	0	0	0	0	0	0
		1	1	6	4	2	0.0	2	0	0	0	0	0	0	0	0	0
