= Northwest Local School District (Hamilton County, Ohio) =

School district in Ohio, United States

Address
- 3377 Compton Road Suite 110 Cincinnati, Ohio, 45251; United States

District information
- Type: Public
- Grades: PK–12
- Schools: 12
- NCES District ID: 3904736

Students and staff
- Students: 8,260 (2024–2025)
- Teachers: 445.09 (on an FTE basis) (2024–2025)
- Staff: 1,113.29 (on an FTE basis) (2024–2025)
- Student–teacher ratio: 18.56 (2024–2025)

Other information
- Website: www.nwlsd.org

Northwest Local School District is a public school district in Hamilton County, Ohio, near Cincinnati, Ohio. It primarily serves Colerain Township, but also includes parts of neighboring Green Township, Springfield Township, and Ross Township.

The school board's general offices are located at 3240 Banning Road in Colerain Township. The district has over 10,000 students and more than 1,200 employees. The district was rated "EXCELLENT" for the 2008/2009 school year by the Ohio Department of Education.

The district was the owner of WNSD, a noncommercial radio station that lasted between 1972 and 1978.

== Schools ==
Elementary Schools (K-5)

- Colerain
- Monfort Heights
- Struble
- Taylor
- Pleasant Run

Middle Schools (6-8)

- Colerain
- Pleasant Run
- White Oak

High Schools (9-12)

- Colerain High School
- Northwest High School
