= Northwest High School (Hamilton County, Ohio) =

Public, coeducational school in Cincinnati, Ohio, United States

Location
- 10761 Pippin Road; Cincinnati, (Hamilton County), Ohio 45231; United States; 39°16′18″N 84°34′35″W

Information
- Type: Public, coeducational
- Motto: Educating Leaders for Tomorrow
- School district: Northwest Local School District
- Superintendent: Darrell Yater
- Principal: Alexander Shrewsberry
- Teaching staff: 42.10 (FTE)
- Grades: 9–12
- Student to teacher ratio: 22.52
- Colors: Blue and Gold
- Fight song: "Hail to the Victors"
- Athletics conference: Southwest Ohio Conference
- Sports: Baseball, basketball, bowling, cross country, football, golf, soccer, softball, swimming, track and field, volleyball, wrestling
- Team name: Knights
- Rival: Mt. Healthy High School (Mt. Healthy, Ohio)
- Accreditation: North Central Association of Colleges and Schools
- Newspaper: Northwest Times / Northwest Press
- Website: nwlsd.org/o/nhs

Northwest High School is a public high school located in Colerain Township, Hamilton County, Ohio, United States, near Cincinnati. It is part of the Northwest Local School District.

The school colors are blue and gold. The motto is "Educating Leaders for Tomorrow". The mascot is the knight, and the sports teams are known as "The Knights".

== Athletics ==
Northwest offers several sports, including baseball, volleyball, softball, basketball, track and field, cross country, cheerleading, soccer, football, swimming, golf, bowling, tennis, and wrestling.

Northwest competes in the Southwest Ohio Conference. All competitive sports teams from the school are Division I, except the football team, which is Division II. Their cross country team has improved in the last three years. The Lady Knights' cross country team was crowned League Champions two years in a row. The men's team is also highly competitive, as they have finished second in Leagues two years in a row.

== Clubs and organizations ==
Northwest High School offers a variety of clubs, including Green Club, Latin Club, Student Senate, Key Club, Cabin Time (Christian Organization), O.A.B., and United Knights.

School music programs include String Orchestra and Band (including Jazz Band, Symphonic Band, and Concert Band). A marching band performs at all home and some away football games. During the winter season, a band plays at home basketball games. A choir branches off into a Women's Ensemble, which performs in the community along with a competitive show choir known as "Knight Lights" that has performed in competitions in Ohio and Indiana. For the last two years, the Women's Ensemble has been on the Star64 Holiday Carols program, which showcases the area's best choirs.

The school's Latin Club functions as a local chapter of both the Ohio Junior Classical League and National Junior Classical League.

== Alumni ==
- Preston Brown - former NFL football linebacker
- Jeremy Chappell - professional basketball player
- Mark Clouse - Washington Commanders president and former food industry CEO
- Lori Foster - New York Times Bestselling Author
- Lewis Johnson - ESPN commentator
- Sharon L. Kennedy - Chief Justice of the Supreme Court of Ohio and former police officer
- Jaycie Phelps - Olympic gymnast and member of the 1996 Olympic gold medal U.S. women's gymnastics team
- Scott Sauerbeck - former Major League Baseball player
- Quentin Sims - NFL and Arena Football League player
- Brian Townsend - former NFL football linebacker
