= Colerain High School (Cincinnati, Ohio) =

Public high school in Cincinnati, Ohio, United States

Location
- 8801 Cheviot Road; Cincinnati, (Hamilton County), Ohio 45251; United States; 39°13′55″N 84°36′11″W

Information
- Type: Public, Coeducational high school
- Established: 1924
- Founder: Nathaniel Bacon
- School district: Northwest Local School District
- Superintendent: Darrell Yater
- Principal: Erin Davis
- Teaching staff: 76.54(FTE)
- Grades: 9-12
- Enrollment: 1,754 (2023–2024)
- Student to teacher ratio: 22.92
- Colors: Red, White, Black, and Grey
- Fight song: WSU Fight Song
- Athletics conference: Greater Miami Conference
- Mascot: Cardinal
- Nickname: C-rain, The 'rain, Cards
- Team name: Cardinals
- Accreditation: North Central Association of Colleges and Schools
- Communities served: Colerain, White Oak, Monfort Heights, Groesbeck, Bevis, Peach Grove, Dunlap
- Feeder schools: White Oak Middle School, Colerain Middle School, Ann Weigel Elementary, Monfort Heights Elementary, Struble Elementary, Colerain Elementary, Taylor Elementary

Colerain High School is a public high school located near Cincinnati, Ohio. It is part of the Northwest Local School District. The high school is located in Colerain Township, about 14 miles northwest of downtown Cincinnati. The original school opened in 1924 under the name Colerain Centralized School at 4700 and 4850 Poole Road and is now Colerain Elementary School and Colerain Middle School. Today's Colerain High School opened in 1964 at its newer address, 8801 Cheviot Road. It is the largest public school in the Colerain area in terms of enrollment and building size, with over 2,200 students currently attending CHS in two buildings on campus, the main school building and the Career Center building. Colerain is among the largest schools in the Cincinnati area and in the state of Ohio.

== Athletics ==
Colerain competes in the Greater Miami Conference in all conference sports except boys' volleyball.

=== Ohio High School Athletic Association State Championships ===
- Football – 2004
- Girls' cross-country – 1997, 1998, 1999, 2000
- Boys' cross-country – 1978

== Notable alumni ==
- B. J. Askew, former NFL player
- Darrian Beavers, current NFL player
- Ivan Pace, current NFL player
- Joe Bolden, former college football player, American football coach
- Eugene Clifford, former NFL player
- Dominick Goodman, former Arena Football League player
- Eric Kattus, former NFL player
- Roger McDowell, former MLB player and coach
- Tegray Scales, current NFL player
- Mary Lee Tracy, artistic gymnastics coach

Notable faculty / coaches

- Kerry Coombs, American football coach
