= 2014 Jacksonville Jaguars season =

20th season in franchise history

- Owner: Shahid Khan
- General manager: David Caldwell
- Head coach: Gus Bradley
- Offensive coordinator: Jedd Fisch
- Defensive coordinator: Bob Babich
- Home stadium: EverBank Field

Results
- Record: 3–13
- Division place: 3rd AFC South
- Playoffs: Did not qualify
- Pro Bowlers: None

Uniform
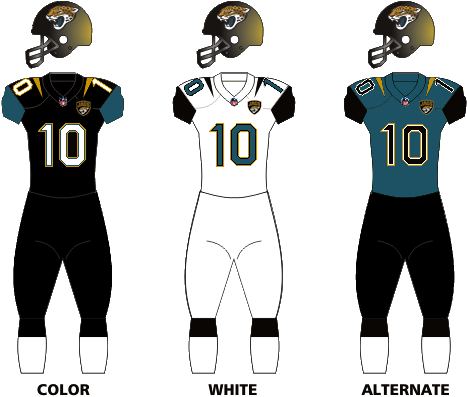

The 2014 season was the Jacksonville Jaguars' 20th in the National Football League (NFL) and their second under head coach Gus Bradley. They failed to improve upon their 4–12 record from 2013 and finished 3–13, and finished third in the AFC South for the second straight year. The Jaguars were eliminated from postseason contention after their Week 12 loss to the Colts.

In Week 13, the Jaguars had their biggest comeback in franchise history, defeating the New York Giants 25–24. The Jaguars trailed 21–0 in the first half, but outscored the Giants 25–3 in the second half, with the help of two defensive touchdowns. The Jaguars did not win a single road game during the season, the second time such a thing happened in franchise history.

== Offseason ==
=== Notable transactions ===
==== Acquisitions ====
- DE Red Bryant, signed on March 8, 2014.
- G Zane Beadles, signed on March 11, 2014.
- RB Toby Gerhart, signed on March 11, 2014.
- LB Dekoda Watson, signed on March 12, 2014.
- DE Chris Clemons, signed on March 13, 2014.
- DT Ziggy Hood, signed on March 13, 2014.

==== Departures ====
- G Uche Nwaneri, released on March 4, 2014.
- RB Justin Forsett, released on March 11, 2014.
- RB Maurice Jones-Drew, declared free agent on March 11, 2014.
- LB Russell Allen, released on April 17, 2014.
- G Will Rackley, released on May 12, 2014.
- DE Jason Babin, released on June 19, 2014.
- G/C Mike Brewster, released on August 29, 2014.
- SS Winston Guy, released on September 29, 2014.

==== Trades ====
- QB Blaine Gabbert was traded to the San Francisco 49ers on March 11, 2014 for a sixth-round pick in the 2014 NFL draft and a conditional pick in the 2015 NFL draft.

=== NFL draft ===
2014 Jacksonville Jaguars draft
Round	Pick	Player	Position	College	Notes
1	3	Blake Bortles	Quarterback	Central Florida	
2	39	Marqise Lee	Wide receiver	USC	
2	61	Allen Robinson *	Wide receiver	Penn State	
3	93	Brandon Linder	Guard	Miami (FL)	
4	114	Aaron Colvin	Cornerback	Oklahoma	
5	144	Telvin Smith *	Linebacker	Florida State	
5	159	Chris Smith	Defensive end	Arkansas	
6	205	Luke Bowanko	Center	Virginia	
7	222	Storm Johnson	Running back	Central Florida	
Made roster † Pro Football Hall of Fame * Made at least one Pro Bowl during career

Draft trades

- The Jaguars traded their original third- and one of their two fifth-round selections — Nos. 70 and 150 overall — to the San Francisco 49ers in exchange for the 49ers' second-round selection (No. 61 overall). The Jaguars previously acquired the No. 150 selection in a trade that sent wide receiver Mike Thomas to the Detroit Lions.
- The Jaguars acquired an additional third-round selection (No. 93 overall) in a trade that sent the team's original fourth- and sixth-round selections (Nos. 105 and 179 overall, respectively) to the New England Patriots.
- The Jaguars acquired additional fourth- and fifth-round selections (Nos. 114 and 159 overall, respectively) in a trade that sent offensive tackle Eugene Monroe to the Baltimore Ravens.
- The Jaguars acquired an additional sixth-round selection (No. 205 overall) in a trade that sent quarterback Blaine Gabbert to the San Francisco 49ers.

=== Undrafted rookie free agents ===
The following is a list of notable rookie free agents signed by the Jaguars after the 2014 NFL draft:

Player	Position	College	Status
Allen Hurns	Wide receiver	Miami (FL)	Made 53-man roster
Tyler Shatley	Guard	Clemson	Made 53-man roster
Josh Wells	Offensive tackle	James Madison	Made 53-man roster
Deandre Coleman	Defensive tackle	California	Made practice squad
Marcel Jensen	Tight end	Fresno State	Made practice squad
Craig Loston	Safety	LSU	Made practice squad
Stephen Morris	Quarterback	Miami (FL)	Made practice squad
Marcus Whitfield	Linebacker	Maryland	Made practice squad
Rashaad Reynolds	Cornerback	Oregon State	Injured reserve

== Staff ==
2014 Jacksonville Jaguars staff
Front office: Owner – Shahid Khan; President – Mark Lamping; General Manager – David Caldwell; Director of Football Administration – Tim Walsh; Assistant Director of Player Personnel – Andy Dengler; Director of Pro Personnel – Chris Polian; Director of College Scouting – Kyle O'Brien; Assistant Director of College Personnel – Tim Mingey; Assistant to the Head Coach/Administrator of Coaching Operations – ElizaBeth Mayers; Head coaches: Head coach – Gus Bradley; Assistant to the head coach – Tyler Wolf; Offensive coaches: Offensive coordinator – Jedd Fisch; Quarterbacks – Frank Scelfo; Running backs – Terry Richardson; Wide receivers – Jerry Sullivan; Tight ends/assistant special teams – Ron Middleton; Offensive line – George Yarno; Assistant offensive line – Luke Butkus; Offensive assistant – Matt Applebaum; Offensive assistant/quality control – Tony Sorrentino; Offensive coaching associate – Chris O'Hara	Defensive coaches: Defensive coordinator – Bob Babich; Defensive line – Todd Wash; Linebackers – Robert Saleh; Assistant linebackers – Scottie Hazelton; Defensive backs – DeWayne Walker; Assistant defensive backs – Mike Rutenberg; Defensive assistant – Aaron Whitecotton; Defensive quality control – Dan Shamash; Special teams coaches: Special teams coordinator – Mike Mallory; Assistant special teams – Matthew Smiley; Strength and conditioning: Strength and conditioning – Tom Myslinski; Strength and conditioning associate – Alex Hampton; Strength and conditioning associate – Jess Langvardt; Assistant strength and conditioning – Cedric Scott

== Final roster ==
2014 Jacksonville Jaguars roster
Quarterbacks (QB): 5 Blake Bortles; 7 Chad Henne; 6 Stephen Morris; Running backs (RB): 21 Toby Gerhart; 34 Storm Johnson; 45 Will Ta'ufo'ou FB; 30 Jordan Todman KR; Wide receivers (WR): 88 Allen Hurns; 11 Marqise Lee; 18 Ace Sanders PR; 84 Cecil Shorts; 13 Tommy Streeter; Tight ends (TE): 86 Clay Harbor; 85 Nic Jacobs; 89 Marcedes Lewis	Offensive linemen (OL): 68 Zane Beadles G; 70 Luke Bowanko C; 76 Luke Joeckel T; 65 Brandon Linder G; 66 Jacques McClendon C/G; 69 Tyler Shatley G; 72 Josh Wells T; 74 Sam Young T; Defensive linemen (DL): 93 Tyson Alualu DE; 90 Andre Branch DE; 79 Red Bryant DE; 91 Chris Clemons DE; 59 Ryan Davis DE; 92 Ziggy Hood DT; 95 Abry Jones DT; 99 Sen'Derrick Marks DT; 97 Roy Miller DT; 98 Chris Smith DE	Linebackers (LB): 57 A. J. Edds OLB; 54 Jeremiah George MLB; 55 Geno Hayes OLB; 56 LaRoy Reynolds OLB; 50 Telvin Smith OLB; 52 J. T. Thomas MLB; Defensive backs (DB): 38 Tommie Campbell CB; 22 Aaron Colvin CB; 37 Johnathan Cyprien SS; 42 Matt Daniels SS; 26 Josh Evans FS; 27 Dwayne Gratz CB; 31 Jeremy Harris CB; 20 Craig Loston FS; 36 Sherrod Martin FS; 35 Demetrius McCray CB; 29 Teddy Williams CB; Special teams (ST): 19 Bryan Anger P; 10 Josh Scobee K; 46 Carson Tinker LS	Practice squad: 73 Cody Booth T; 12 Mike Brown WR; 87 Marcel Jensen TE (IR); 43 Eric Kettani FB; 81 Mickey Shuler TE; 25 Peyton Thompson S; 80 Tony Washington WR; 48 Marcus Whitfield LB; Reserve: 23 Alan Ball CB (IR); 14 Justin Blackmon WR (Susp.); 24 Will Blackmon CB (IR); 83 Damian Copeland WR (IR); 17 Tandon Doss WR (IR); 33 Bradie Ewing FB (IR); 58 Khairi Fortt OLB (IR); 53 John Lotulelei OLB (IR); 48 Fendi Onobun TE (IR); 67 Austin Pasztor T (IR); 51 Paul Posluszny MLB (IR); 40 Rashaad Reynolds CB (IR); 15 Allen Robinson WR (IR); 16 Denard Robinson RB (IR); Rookies in italics 53 active, 15 reserve, 7 practice squad

== Preseason ==
Week	Date	Opponent	Result	Record	Venue	Recap
1	August 8	Tampa Bay Buccaneers	W 16–10	1–0	EverBank Field	Recap
2	August 14	at Chicago Bears	L 19–20	1–1	Soldier Field	Recap
3	August 22	at Detroit Lions	L 12–13	1–2	Ford Field	Recap
4	August 28	Atlanta Falcons	L 14–24	1–3	EverBank Field	Recap

== Regular season ==
=== Schedule ===
Week	Date	Opponent	Result	Record	Venue	Recap
1	September 7	at Philadelphia Eagles	**L** 17–34	0–1	Lincoln Financial Field	Recap
2	September 14	at Washington Redskins	**L** 10–41	0–2	FedExField	Recap
3	September 21	**Indianapolis Colts**	**L** 17–44	0–3	EverBank Field	Recap
4	September 28	at San Diego Chargers	**L** 14–33	0–4	Qualcomm Stadium	Recap
5	October 5	Pittsburgh Steelers	**L** 9–17	0–5	EverBank Field	Recap
6	October 12	at **Tennessee Titans**	**L** 14–16	0–6	LP Field	Recap
7	October 19	Cleveland Browns	**W** 24–6	1–6	EverBank Field	Recap
8	October 26	Miami Dolphins	**L** 13–27	1–7	EverBank Field	Recap
9	November 2	at Cincinnati Bengals	**L** 23–33	1–8	Paul Brown Stadium	Recap
10	November 9	Dallas Cowboys	**L** 17–31	1–9	(United Kingdom) Wembley Stadium (London)	Recap
11	Bye					
12	November 23	at **Indianapolis Colts**	**L** 3–23	1–10	Lucas Oil Stadium	Recap
13	November 30	New York Giants	**W** 25–24	2–10	EverBank Field	Recap
14	December 7	**Houston Texans**	**L** 13–27	2–11	EverBank Field	Recap
15	December 14	at Baltimore Ravens	**L** 12–20	2–12	M&T Bank Stadium	Recap
16	December 18	**Tennessee Titans**	**W** 21–13	3–12	EverBank Field	Recap
17	December 28	at **Houston Texans**	**L** 17–23	3–13	NRG Stadium	Recap

Note: Intra-division opponents are in bold text.

=== Game summaries ===
==== Week 1: at Philadelphia Eagles ====
Week One: Jacksonville Jaguars at Philadelphia Eagles – Game summary

Quarter	1	2	3	4	Total
Jaguars	14	3	0	0	**17**
**Eagles**	0	0	14	20	**34**

at Lincoln Financial Field, Philadelphia, Pennsylvania

- Date: September 7, 2014
- Game time: 1:00 p.m. EDT
- Game weather: Sunny, 75 °F (24 °C)
- Game attendance: 69,596
- Referee: Jeff Triplette
- TV announcers (CBS): Andrew Catalon, Steve Beuerlein, and Steve Tasker
- Recap, Game Book

Game information

**First quarter**

- JAX – Allen Hurns 34-yard pass from Chad Henne (Josh Scobee kick), 9:00. Jaguars 7–0. **Drive: 4 plays, 44 yards, 1:58.**
- JAX – Allen Hurns 21-yard pass from Chad Henne (Josh Scobee kick), 6:50. Jaguars 14–0. **Drive: 2 plays, 21 yards, 0:10.**

**Second quarter**

- JAX – Josh Scobee 49-yard field goal, 14:14. Jaguars 17–0. **Drive: 7 plays, 68 yards, 2:13.**

**Third quarter**

- PHI – Darren Sproles 49-yard run (Cody Parkey kick), 11:44. Jaguars 17–7. **Drive: 10 plays, 80 yards, 3:16.**
- PHI – Zach Ertz 25-yard TD pass from Nick Foles (Cody Parkey kick), 7:19. Jaguars 17–14. **Drive: 6 plays, 40 yards, 2:10.**

**Fourth quarter**

- PHI – Cody Parkey 51-yard field goal, 10:55. Tied 17–17. **Drive: 12 plays, 55 yards, 4:10.**
- PHI – Jeremy Maclin 68-yard pass from Nick Foles (Cody Parkey kick), 6:59. Eagles 24–17. **Drive: 1 plays, 68 yards, 0:11.**
- PHI – Cody Parkey 28-yard field goal, 1:57. Eagles 27–17. **Drive: 7 plays, 20 yards, 3:59.**
- PHI – Fletcher Cox 17-yard fumble return (Cody Parkey kick), 1:23. Eagles 34–17.

**Top passers**

- JAX – Chad Henne – 24/43, 266 yards, 2 TD
- PHI – Nick Foles – 27/45, 322 yards, 2 TD, INT

**Top rushers**

- JAX – Toby Gerhart – 18 rushes, 42 yards
- PHI – LeSean McCoy – 21 rushes, 74 yards

**Top receivers**

- JAX – Marqise Lee – 6 receptions, 62 yards
- PHI – LeSean McCoy – 6 receptions, 41 yards

**Top tacklers**

- JAX – Paul Posluszny – 11 tackles, 1 assist
- PHI – Mychal Kendricks – 6 tackles, 1 sack

==== Week 2: at Washington Redskins ====
Week Two: Jacksonville Jaguars at Washington Redskins – Game summary

Quarter	1	2	3	4	Total
Jaguars	0	7	0	3	**10**
**Redskins**	7	14	3	17	**41**

at FedExField, Landover, Maryland

- Date: September 14, 2014
- Game time: 1:00 p.m. EDT
- Game weather: Sunny, 65 °F (18 °C)
- Game attendance: 80,037
- Referee: Ron Torbert
- TV announcers (CBS): Spero Dedes and Solomon Wilcots
- Recap, Game Book

Game information

**First quarter**

- WAS – Darrel Young 22-yard pass from Kirk Cousins (Kai Forbath kick), 8:12. Redskins 7–0. **Drive: 7 plays, 76 yards, 3:35.**

**Second quarter**

- WAS – Alfred Morris 1-yard run (Kai Forbath kick), 14:18. Redskins 14–0. **Drive: 7 plays, 66 yards, 3:31.**
- WAS – Alfred Morris 1-yard run (Kai Forbath kick), 7:28. Redskins 21–0. **Drive: 10 plays, 92 yards, 5:10.**
- JAX – Marcedes Lewis 63-yard pass from Chad Henne (Josh Scobee kick), 1:40. Redskins 21–7. **Drive: 5 plays, 71 yards, 1:35.**

**Third quarter**

- WAS – Kai Forbath 36-yard field goal, 8:30. Redskins 24–7. **Drive: 10 plays, 13 yards, 4:21.**

**Fourth quarter**

- WAS – Niles Paul 2-yard pass from Kirk Cousins (Kai Forbath kick), 14:12. Redskins 31–7. **Drive: 11 plays, 65 yards, 4:40.**
- WAS – Kai Forbath 42-yard field goal, 10:40. Redskins 34–7. **Drive: 6 plays, 5 yards, 2:32.**
- JAX – Josh Scobee 36-yard field goal, 6:50. Redskins 34–10. **Drive: 9 plays, 63 yards, 3:50.**
- WAS – Silas Redd 14-yard run (Kai Forbath kick), 1:52. Redskins 41–10. **Drive: 8 plays, 41 yards, 4:58.**

**Top passers**

- JAX – Chad Henne – 14/28, 193 yards, TD, INT
- WAS – Kirk Cousins – 22/33, 250 yards, 2 TD

**Top rushers**

- JAX – Chad Henne – 3 rushes, 17 yards
- WAS – Alfred Morris – 22 rushes, 85 yards, 2 TD

**Top receivers**

- JAX – Allen Robinson – 4 receptions, 75 yards
- WAS – Niles Paul – 8 receptions, 99 yards, TD

**Top tacklers**

- JAX – Josh Evans – 8 tackles, 6 assists
- WAS – Keenan Robinson – 4 tackles, 2 assists

==== Week 3: vs. Indianapolis Colts ====
Week Three: Indianapolis Colts at Jacksonville Jaguars – Game summary

Quarter	1	2	3	4	Total
**Colts**	10	20	0	14	**44**
Jaguars	0	0	3	14	**17**

at EverBank Field, Jacksonville, Florida

- Date: September 21, 2014
- Game time: 1:00 p.m. EDT
- Game weather: 85 °F (29 °C)
- Game attendance: 60,601
- Referee: Walt Coleman
- TV announcers (CBS): Tom McCarthy and Adam Archuleta
- Recap, Game Book

Game information

**First quarter**

- IND – Adam Vinatieri 48-yard field goal, 9:37. Colts 3–0. **Drive: 12 plays, 50 yards, 5:23.**
- IND – Ahmad Bradshaw 6-yard pass from Andrew Luck (Adam Vinatieri kick), 1:50. Colts 10–0. **Drive: 9 plays, 74 yards, 5:46.**

**Second quarter**

- IND – Dwayne Allen 1-yard pass from Andrew Luck (Adam Vinatieri kick), 12:28. Colts 17–0. **Drive: 7 plays, 76 yards, 3:27.**
- IND – Adam Vinatieri 43-yard field goal, 9:08. Colts 20–0. **Drive: 6 plays, 33 yards, 2:07.**
- IND – Adam Vinatieri 25-yard field goal, 1:10. Colts 23–0. **Drive: 9 plays, 73 yards, 4:14.**
- IND – Coby Fleener 7-yard pass from Andrew Luck (Adam Vinatieri kick), 0:28. Colts 30–0. **Drive: 4 plays, 29 yards, 0:31.**

**Third quarter**

- JAX – Josh Scobee 41-yard field goal, 5:13. Colts 30–3. **Drive: 8 plays, 57 yards, 3:07.**

**Fourth quarter**

- IND – Hakeem Nicks 1-yard pass from Andrew Luck (Adam Vinatieri kick), 8:53. Colts 37–3. **Drive: 10 plays, 64 yards, 4:42.**
- JAX – Allen Hurns 63-yard pass from Blake Bortles (Josh Scobee kick), 6:51. Colts 37–10. **Drive: 5 plays, 80 yards, 2:02.**
- IND – Greg Toler 47-yard interception return (Adam Vinatieri kick), 2:58. Colts 44–10.
- JAX – Cecil Shorts III 10-yard pass from Blake Bortles (Josh Scobee kick), 0:18. Colts 44–17. **Drive: 8 plays, 80 yards, 2:40.**

**Top passers**

- IND – Andrew Luck – 31/39, 370 yards, 4 TD
- JAX – Blake Bortles – 14/24, 223 yards, 2 TD, 2 INT

**Top rushers**

- IND – Ahmad Bradshaw – 9 rushes, 65 yards
- JAX – Denard Robinson – 8 rushes, 33 yards

**Top receivers**

- IND – T. Y. Hilton – 5 receptions, 80 yards
- JAX – Allen Robinson – 7 receptions, 79 yards

**Top tacklers**

- IND – D'Qwell Jackson – 10 tackles
- JAX – Geno Hayes – 7 tackles, 1 assist

==== Week 4: at San Diego Chargers ====
Week Four: Jacksonville Jaguars at San Diego Chargers – Game summary

Quarter	1	2	3	4	Total
Jaguars	0	14	0	0	**14**
**Chargers**	3	14	10	6	**33**

at Qualcomm Stadium, San Diego, California

- Date: September 28, 2014
- Game time: 1:05 p.m. PDT
- Game weather: Sunny, 73 °F (23 °C)
- Game attendance: 56,553
- Referee: Clete Blakeman
- TV announcers (CBS): Andrew Catalon, Steve Beuerlein, and Steve Tasker
- Recap, Game Book

Game information

**First quarter**

- SD – Nick Novak 33-yard field goal, 3:44. Chargers 3–0. **Drive: 7 plays, 36 yards, 3:08.**

**Second quarter**

- JAX – Toby Gerhart 1-yard run (Josh Scobee kick), 14:06. Jaguars 7–3. **Drive: 10 plays, 68 yards, 4:38.**
- SD – Eddie Royal 47-yard pass from Philip Rivers (Nick Novak kick), 11:24. Chargers 10–3. **Drive: 5 plays, 83 yards, 2:42.**
- JAX – Nic Jacobs 2-yard pass from Blake Bortles (Josh Scobee kick), 7:17. Jaguars 14–10. **Drive: 7 plays, 76 yards, 4:07.**
- SD – Eddie Royal 47-yard pass from Philip Rivers (Nick Novak kick), 0:59. Chargers 17–14. **Drive: 4 plays, 55 yards, 1:07.**

**Third quarter**

- SD – Malcom Floyd 43-yard pass from Philip Rivers (Nick Novak kick), 11:09. Chargers 24–14. **Drive: 9 plays, 80 yards, 3:51.**
- SD – Nick Novak 34-yard field goal, 6:10. Chargers 27–14. **Drive: 7 plays, 24 yards, 3:08.**

**Fourth quarter**

- SD – Nick Novak 23-yard field goal, 13:35. Chargers 30–14. **Drive: 14 plays, 75 yards, 5:28.**
- SD – Nick Novak 37-yard field goal, 1:09. Chargers 33–14. **Drive: 7 plays, 19 yards, 2:31.**

**Top passers**

- JAX – Blake Bortles – 29/37, 254 yards, TD, 2 INT
- SD – Philip Rivers – 29/39, 377 yards, 3 TD

**Top rushers**

- JAX – Toby Gerhart – 10 rushes, 32 yards, TD
- SD – Branden Oliver – 9 rushes, 23 yards

**Top receivers**

- JAX – Clay Harbor – 8 receptions, 70 yards
- SD – Keenan Allen – 10 receptions, 135 yards

**Top tacklers**

- JAX – Paul Posluszny – 9 tackles, 2 assists
- SD – Donald Butler – 7 tackles, 3 assists

==== Week 5: vs. Pittsburgh Steelers ====
Week Five: Pittsburgh Steelers at Jacksonville Jaguars – Game summary

Quarter	1	2	3	4	Total
**Steelers**	0	10	0	7	**17**
Jaguars	3	3	3	0	**9**

at EverBank Field, Jacksonville, Florida

- Date: October 5, 2014
- Game time: 1:00 p.m. EDT
- Game weather: 71 °F (22 °C)
- Game attendance: 66,198
- Referee: Terry McAulay
- TV announcers (CBS): Spero Dedes and Solomon Wilcots
- Recap, Game Book

Game information

**First quarter**

- JAX – Josh Scobee 43-yard field goal, 5:17. Jaguars 3–0. **Drive: 15 plays, 43 yards, 8:08.**

**Second quarter**

- PIT – Shaun Suisham 24-yard field goal, 12:35. Tied 3–3. **Drive: 9 plays, 65 yards, 3:35.**
- PIT – Michael Palmer 2-yard pass from Ben Roethlisberger (Shaun Suisham kick), 1:53. Steelers 10–3. **Drive: 10 plays, 70 yards, 4:53.**
- JAX – Josh Scobee 35-yard field goal, 0:09. Steelers 10–6. **Drive: 10 plays, 58 yards, 1:44.**

**Third quarter**

- JAX – Josh Scobee 36-yard field goal, 3:16. Steelers 10–9. **Drive: 8 plays, 68 yards, 3:17.**

**Fourth quarter**

- PIT – Brice McCain 22-yard interception return (Shaun Suisham kick), 11:32. Steelers 17–9.

**Top passers**

- PIT – Ben Roethlisberger – 26/36, 273 yards, TD
- JAX – Blake Bortles – 22/36, 191 yards, 2 INT

**Top rushers**

- PIT – Le'Veon Bell – 15 rushes, 82 yards
- JAX – Storm Johnson – 4 rushes, 27 yards

**Top receivers**

- PIT – Antonio Brown – 5 receptions, 84 yards
- JAX – Allen Robinson – 5 receptions, 51 yards

**Top tacklers**

- PIT – Paul Posluszny – 9 tackles, 3 assists, 1 sack
- JAX – Cortez Allen – 7 tackles

==== Week 6: at Tennessee Titans ====
Week Six: Jacksonville Jaguars at Tennessee Titans – Game summary

Quarter	1	2	3	4	Total
Jaguars	7	0	0	7	**14**
**Titans**	3	7	3	3	**16**

at LP Field, Nashville, Tennessee

- Date: October 12, 2014
- Game time: 12:00 p.m. CDT
- Game weather: Cloudy, 67 °F (19 °C)
- Game attendance: 69,143
- Referee: Jeff Triplette
- TV announcers (CBS): Andrew Catalon, Steve Beuerlein, and Steve Tasker
- Recap, Game Book

Game information

**First quarter**

- JAX – Storm Johnson 1-yard run (Josh Scobee kick), 11:17. Jaguars 7–0. **Drive: 7 plays, 80 yards, 3:43.**
- TEN – Ryan Succop 25-yard field goal, 0:44. Jaguars 7–3. **Drive: 11 plays, 67 yards, 6:01.**

**Second quarter**

- TEN – Jackie Battle 1-yard run (Ryan Succop kick), 1:04. Titans 10–7. **Drive: 8 plays, 80 yards, 4:30.**

**Third quarter**

- TEN – Ryan Succop 21-yard field goal, 8:52 Titans 13–7. **Drive: 13 plays, 77 yards, 6:08.**

**Fourth quarter**

- TEN – Ryan Succop 42-yard field goal, 14:49. Titans 16–7. **Drive: 7 plays, 26 yards, 3:14.**
- JAX – Clay Harbor 20-yard pass from Blake Bortles (Josh Scobee kick), 0:37. Titans 16–14. **Drive: 9 plays, 83 yards, 2:06.**

**Top passers**

- JAX – Blake Bortles – 32/46, 336 yards, TD, INT
- TEN – Charlie Whitehurst – 17/28, 233 yards

**Top rushers**

- JAX – Blake Bortles – 5 rushes, 38 yards
- TEN – Bishop Sankey – 18 rushes, 61 yards

**Top receivers**

- JAX – Cecil Shorts – 10 receptions, 103 yards
- TEN – Justin Hunter – 3 receptions, 77 yards

**Top tacklers**

- JAX – Johnathan Cyprien – 12 tackles, 3 assists
- TEN – Blidi Wreh-Wilson – 10 tackles, 1 assist, INT

==== Week 7: vs. Cleveland Browns ====
Week Seven: Cleveland Browns at Jacksonville Jaguars – Game summary

Quarter	1	2	3	4	Total
Browns	3	3	0	0	**6**
**Jaguars**	0	7	3	14	**24**

at EverBank Field, Jacksonville, Florida

- Date: October 19, 2014
- Game time: 1:00 p.m. EDT
- Game weather: 76 °F (24 °C)
- Game attendance: 61,341
- Referee: Tony Corrente
- TV announcers (CBS): Andrew Catalon, Steve Beuerlein, and Steve Tasker
- Recap, Game Book

Game information

**First quarter**

- CLE – Billy Cundiff 40-yard field goal, 6:30. Browns 3–0. **Drive: 4 plays, -5 yards, 1:22.**

**Second quarter**

- CLE – Billy Cundiff 22-yard field goal, 4:16. Browns 6–0. **Drive: 14 plays, 76 yards, 5:21.**
- JAX – Allen Robinson 31-yard pass from Blake Bortles (Josh Scobee kick), 0:27. Jaguars 7–6. **Drive: 3 plays, 76 yards, 1:06.**

**Third quarter**

- JAX – Josh Scobee 30-yard field goal, 10:00. Jaguars 10–6. **Drive: 7 plays, 13 yards, 2:08.**

**Fourth quarter**

- JAX – Denard Robinson 8-yard run (Josh Scobee kick), 5:58. Jaguars 17–6. **Drive: 1 plays, 8 yards, 0:03.**
- JAX – Storm Johnson 3-yard run (Josh Scobee kick), 4:35. Jaguars 24–6. **Drive: 2 plays, 7 yards, 0:37.**

**Top passers**

- CLE – Brian Hoyer – 16/41, 215 yards, INT
- JAX – Blake Bortles – 17/31, 159 yards, TD, 3 INT

**Top rushers**

- CLE – Ben Tate – 16 carries, 36 yards
- JAX – Denard Robinson – 22 carries, 127 yards, TD

**Top receivers**

- CLE – Andrew Hawkins – 5 receptions, 112 yards
- JAX – Allen Robinson – 4 receptions, 60 yards, TD

**Top tacklers**

- CLE – Christian Kirksey – 7 tackles, 2 assists, 1 sack
- JAX – Paul Posluszny – 5 tackles, 7 assists, 1 sack, fumble recovery

==== Week 8: vs. Miami Dolphins ====
Week Eight: Miami Dolphins at Jacksonville Jaguars – Game summary

Quarter	1	2	3	4	Total
**Dolphins**	0	10	14	3	**27**
Jaguars	0	3	3	7	**13**

at EverBank Field, Jacksonville, Florida

- Date: October 26, 2014
- Game time: 1:00 p.m. EDT
- Game weather: 76 °F (24 °C)
- Game attendance: 65,633
- Referee: Jerome Boger
- TV announcers (CBS): Andrew Catalon, Steve Beuerlein, and Steve Tasker
- Recap, Game Book

Game information

**First quarter**

- No scoring plays.

**Second quarter**

- MIA – Louis Delmas 81-yard interception return (Caleb Sturgis kick), 14:46. Dolphins 7–0.
- JAX – Josh Scobee 30-yard field goal, 6:28. Dolphins 7–3. **Drive: 14 plays, 66 yards, 8:18.**
- MIA – Caleb Sturgis 43-yard field goal, 0:58. Dolphins 10–3. **Drive: 11 plays, 52 yards, 3:23.**

**Third quarter**

- MIA – Brent Grimes 22-yard interception return (Caleb Sturgis kick), 12:16. Dolphins 17–3.
- JAX – Josh Scobee 40-yard field goal, 7:55. Dolphins 17–6. **Drive: 10 plays, 58 yards, 4:21.**
- MIA – Rishard Matthews 3-yard pass from Ryan Tannehill (Caleb Sturgis kick), 2:18. Dolphins 24–6. **Drive: 7 plays, 95 yards, 3:32.**

**Fourth quarter**

- MIA – Caleb Sturgis 29-yard field goal, 3:54. Dolphins 27–6. **Drive: 9 plays, 68 yards, 4:27.**
- JAX – Allen Robinson 48-yard pass from Blake Bortles (Josh Scobee kick), 2:19. Dolphins 27–13. **Drive: 5 plays, 80 yards, 1:35.**

**Top passers**

- MIA – Ryan Tannehill – 16/29, 196 yards, TD, INT
- JAX – Blake Bortles – 18/34, 221 yards, TD, 2 INT

**Top rushers**

- MIA – Lamar Miller – 14 carries, 78 yards
- JAX – Denard Robinson – 18 carries, 108 yards

**Top receivers**

- MIA – Mike Wallace – 2 receptions, 59 yards
- JAX – Allen Robinson – 5 receptions, 82 yards, TD

**Top tacklers**

- MIA – Reshad Jones – 6 tackles, 2 assists, 1 sack
- JAX – Johnathan Cyprien – 10 tackles

==== Week 9: at Cincinnati Bengals ====
Week Nine: Jacksonville Jaguars at Cincinnati Bengals – Game summary

Quarter	1	2	3	4	Total
Jaguars	3	0	7	13	**23**
**Bengals**	0	12	7	14	**33**

at Paul Brown Stadium, Cincinnati, Ohio

- Date: November 2, 2014
- Game time: 1:00 p.m. EST
- Game weather: Sunny, 42 °F (6 °C)
- Game attendance: 60,057
- Referee: Ron Torbert
- TV announcers (CBS): Spero Dedes and Solomon Wilcots
- Recap, Game Book

Game information

**First quarter**

- JAX – Josh Scobee 25-yard field goal, 1:21. Jaguars 3–0. **Drive: 10 plays, 79 yards, 5:17.**

**Second quarter**

- CIN – Mohamed Sanu 19-yard pass from Andy Dalton (Mike Nugent kick), 11:48. Bengals 7–3. **Drive: 10 plays, 80 yards, 4:33.**
- CIN – Mike Nugent 21-yard field goal, 4:25. Bengals 10–3. **Drive: 10 plays, 49 yards, 5:29.**
- CIN – Punt blocked by Taylor Mays in end zone for a safety, 2:58. Bengals 12–3.

**Third quarter**

- CIN – Jeremy Hill 1-yard run (Mike Nugent kick), 10:33. Bengals 19–3. **Drive: 8 plays, 62 yards, 4:27.**
- JAX – Allen Hurns 40-yard pass from Blake Bortles (Josh Scobee kick), 9:36. Bengals 19–10. **Drive: 3 plays, 64 yards, 0:57.**

**Fourth quarter**

- CIN – A. J. Green 18-yard pass from Andy Dalton (Mike Nugent kick), 13:54. Bengals 26–10. **Drive: 2 plays, 23 yards, 0:45.**
- JAX – Allen Hurns 18-yard pass from Blake Bortles (pass failed), 9:55. Bengals 26–16. **Drive: 8 plays, 75 yards, 3:59.**
- JAX – Denard Robinson 5-yard run (Josh Scobee kick), 8:13. Bengals 26–23. **Drive: 2 plays, 7 yards, 0:37.**
- CIN – Jeremy Hill 60-yard run (Mike Nugent kick), 8:04. Bengals 33–23. **Drive: 1 play, 60 yards, 0:09.**

**Top passers**

- JAX – Blake Bortles – 22/33, 247 yards, 2 TD, INT
- CIN – Andy Dalton – 19/31, 233 yards, 2 TD, 2 INT

**Top rushers**

- JAX – Denard Robinson – 17 carries, 94 yards, TD
- CIN – Jeremy Hill – 24 carries, 154 yards, 2 TD

**Top receivers**

- JAX – Allen Hurns – 7 receptions, 112 yards, 2 TD
- CIN – Mohamed Sanu – 4 receptions, 95 yards, TD

**Top tacklers**

- JAX – Johnathan Cyprien – 4 tackles, 5 assists
- CIN – Emmanuel Lamur – 3 tackles, 5 assists

==== Week 10: vs. Dallas Cowboys ====
NFL International Series

Week Ten: Dallas Cowboys at Jacksonville Jaguars – Game summary

Quarter	1	2	3	4	Total
**Cowboys**	10	14	7	0	**31**
Jaguars	7	0	0	10	**17**

at Wembley Stadium, London, England

- Date: November 9, 2014
- Game time: 6:00 p.m. GMT/1:00 p.m. EST
- Game weather: Clear, 50 °F (10 °C)
- Game attendance: 83,603
- Referee: John Parry
- TV announcers (Fox): Kenny Albert, Daryl Johnston, and Tony Siragusa
- Recap, Game Book

Game information

**First quarter**

- DAL – Dan Bailey 54-yard field goal, 12:09. Cowboys 3–0. **Drive: 6 plays, 44 yards, 2:51.**
- JAX - Denard Robinson 32-yard run (Josh Scobee kick), 7:36. Jaguars 7-3. **Drive: 9 plays, 80 yards, 4:33.**
- DAL - Jason Witten 2-yard pass from Tony Romo (Dan Bailey kick), 2:30. Cowboys 10-3. **Drive: 3 plays, 6 yards, 0:57.**

**Second quarter**

- DAL - Dez Bryant 35-yard pass from Tony Romo (Dan Bailey kick), 7:01. Cowboys 17-3. **Drive: 5 plays, 65 yards, 2:52.**
- DAL - Dez Bryant 68-yard pass from Tony Romo (Dan Bailey kick), 0:19. Cowboys 24-7. **Drive: 1 play, 68 yards, 0:12.**

**Third quarter**

- DAL - Joseph Randle 40-yard run (Dan Bailey kick), 7:34. Cowboys 31-7. **Drive: 6 plays, 87 yards, 3:33.**

**Fourth quarter**

- JAX - Penalty on Kyle Wilber enforced in end zone for a safety, 7:55. Cowboys 31-9.
- JAX - Denard Robinson 1-yard run (Allen Robinson pass from Blake Bortles), 1:53. Cowboys 31-17. **Drive: 7 plays, 54 yards, 1:27.**

**Top passers**

- DAL – Tony Romo – 20/27, 246 yards, 3 TD
- JAX – Blake Bortles – 22/37, 290 yards, INT

**Top rushers**

- DAL – DeMarco Murray – 19 carries, 100 yards
- JAX – Denard Robinson – 15 carries, 60 yards, 2 TD

**Top receivers**

- DAL – Dez Bryant – 6 receptions, 158 yards, 2 TD
- JAX – Cecil Shorts – 5 receptions, 119 yards

**Top tacklers**

- DAL – Anthony Hitchens – 9 tackles
- JAX – Demetrius McCray – 6 tackles

==== Week 12: at Indianapolis Colts ====
Week Twelve: Jacksonville Jaguars at Indianapolis Colts – Game summary

Quarter	1	2	3	4	Total
Jaguars	3	0	0	0	**3**
**Colts**	3	3	14	3	**23**

at Lucas Oil Stadium, Indianapolis, Indiana

- Date: November 23, 2014
- Game time: 1:00 p.m. EST
- Game weather: None (retractable roof closed)
- Game attendance: 64,328
- Referee: Ed Hochuli
- TV announcers (CBS): Tom McCarthy and Chris Simms
- Recap, Game Book

Game information

**First quarter**

- IND – Adam Vinatieri 46-yard field goal, 10:32. Colts 3–0. **Drive: 4 plays, -6 yards, 1:28.**
- JAX - Josh Scobee 28-yard field goal, 4:17. Tied 3-3. **Drive: 4 plays, 2 yards, 2:28.**

**Second quarter**

- IND - Adam Vinatieri 20-yard field goal, 0:12. Colts 6-3. **Drive: 10 plays, 52 yards, 2:19.**

**Third quarter**

- IND - Trent Richardson 1-yard run (Adam Vinatieri kick), 8:31. Colts 13-3. **Drive: 9 plays, 38 yards, 5:08.**
- IND - T. Y. Hilton 73-yard pass from Andrew Luck (Adam Vinatieri kick), 6:08. Colts 20-3. **Drive: 2 plays, 85 yards, 0:38.**

**Fourth quarter**

- IND - Adam Vinatieri 32-yard field goal, 14:52. Colts 23-3. **Drive: 11 plays, 77 yards, 4:28.**

**Top passers**

- JAX – Blake Bortles – 15/27, 146 yards, INT
- IND – Andrew Luck – 21/32, 253 yards, TD

**Top rushers**

- JAX – Toby Gerhart – 4 carries, 31 yards
- IND – Dan Herron – 12 carries, 65 yards

**Top receivers**

- JAX – Marqise Lee – 3 receptions, 52 yards
- IND – T. Y. Hilton – 4 receptions, 122 yards, TD

**Top tacklers**

- JAX – Telvin Smith – 10 tackles, 3 assists, 2 fumbles recovered
- IND – D'Qwell Jackson – 5 tackles, 7 assists, 1 sack

==== Week 13: vs. New York Giants ====
Week Thirteen: New York Giants at Jacksonville Jaguars – Game summary

Quarter	1	2	3	4	Total
Giants	0	21	0	3	**24**
**Jaguars**	0	3	13	9	**25**

at EverBank Field, Jacksonville, Florida

- Date: November 30, 2014
- Game time: 1:00 p.m. EST
- Game weather: 71 °F (22 °C)
- Game attendance: 64,687
- Referee: Craig Wrolstad
- TV announcers (Fox): Justin Kutcher, David Diehl, and Laura Okmin
- Recap, Game Book

Game information

**First quarter**

- No scoring plays.

**Second quarter**

- NYG - Rashad Jennings 2-yard run (Josh Brown kick), 14:57. Giants 7-0. **Drive: 19 plays, 91 yards, 9:51.**
- NYG - Preston Parker 3-yard pass from Eli Manning (Josh Brown kick), 11:27. Giants 14-0. **Drive: 6 plays, 54 yards, 3:01.**
- NYG - Rashad Jennings 17-yard run (Josh Brown kick), 6:30. Giants 21-0. **Drive: 7 plays, 63 yards, 3:29.**
- JAX - Josh Scobee 28-yard field goal, 2:03. Giants 21-3. **Drive: 12 plays, 70 yards, 4:27.**

**Third quarter**

- JAX - J.T. Thomas fumble recovery in end zone (Josh Scobee kick), 11:13. Giants 21-10.
- JAX - Marqise Lee 30-yard pass from Blake Bortles (pass failed), 1:55. Giants 21-16. **Drive: 6 plays, 67 yards, 2:55.**

**Fourth quarter**

- JAX - Aaron Colvin 41-yard fumble return (pass failed), 12:56. Jaguars 22-21.
- NYG - Josh Brown 33 yard field goal, 3:26. Giants 24-22. **Drive: 8 plays, 54 yards, 2:36.**
- JAX - Josh Scobee 43 yard field goal, 0:28. Jaguars 25-24. **Drive: 11 plays, 55 yards, 2:58.**

**Top passers**

- NYG – Eli Manning – 24/34, 247 yards, TD
- JAX – Blake Bortles – 21/35, 194 yards, TD

**Top rushers**

- NYG – Rashad Jennings – 26 carries, 91 yards, 2 TD
- JAX – Blake Bortles – 5 carries, 68 yards

**Top receivers**

- NYG – Odell Beckham Jr. – 7 receptions, 90 yards
- JAX – Marqise Lee – 6 receptions, 75 yards, TD

**Top tacklers**

- NYG – Jameel McClain – 6 tackles, 3 assists, 1 sack
- JAX – J.T. Thomas – 6 tackles, 6 assists

==== Week 14: vs. Houston Texans ====
Week Fourteen: Houston Texans at Jacksonville Jaguars – Game summary

Quarter	1	2	3	4	Total
**Texans**	3	7	7	10	**27**
Jaguars	7	6	0	0	**13**

at EverBank Field, Jacksonville, Florida

- Date: December 7, 2014
- Game time: 1:00 p.m. EST
- Game weather: 61 °F (16 °C)
- Game attendance: 61,070
- Referee: Carl Cheffers
- TV announcers (CBS): Brian Anderson and Adam Archuleta
- Recap, Game Book

Game information

**First quarter**

- JAX – Allen Hurns 4-yard pass from Blake Bortles (Josh Scobee kick), 3:39. Jaguars 7-0. **Drive: 7 plays, 50 yards, 3:27.**
- HOU – Randy Bullock 44-yard field goal, 1:22. Jaguars 7-3. **Drive: 5 plays, 54 yards, 2:17.**

**Second quarter**

- HOU – Ryan Fitzpatrick 4-yard run (Randy Bullock kick), 11:45. Texans 10-7. **Drive: 6 plays, 52 yards, 3:15.**
- JAX – Josh Scobee 33-yard field goal, 5:53. Tied 10-10. **Drive: 11 plays, 59 yards, 5:52.**
- JAX – Josh Scobee 37-yard field goal, 1:09. Jaguars 13-10. **Drive: 13 plays, 67 yards, 3:38.**

**Third quarter**

- HOU – Alfred Blue 1-yard run (Randy Bullock kick), 3:23. Texans 17-13. **Drive: 16 plays, 84 yards, 8:29.**

**Fourth quarter**

- HOU – Arian Foster 1-yard run (Randy Bullock kick), 14:23. Texans 24-13. **Drive: 6 plays, 26 yards, 2:48.**
- HOU – Randy Bullock 44-yard field goal, 8:39. Texans 27-13. **Drive: 9 plays, 54 yards, 4:51.**

**Top passers**

- HOU – Ryan Fitzpatrick – 13/19, 135 yards
- JAX – Blake Bortles – 20/39, 205 yards, TD, INT

**Top rushers**

- HOU – Arian Foster – 24 carries, 127 yards, TD
- JAX – Denard Robinson – 10 carries, 30 yards

**Top receivers**

- HOU – DeAndre Hopkins – 4 receptions, 49 yards
- JAX – Marcedes Lewis – 3 receptions, 69 yards

**Top tacklers**

- HOU – Mike Mohamed – 5 tackles, 3 assists
- JAX – Johnathan Cyprien – 5 tackles, 3 assists

==== Week 15: at Baltimore Ravens ====
Week Fifteen: Jacksonville Jaguars at Baltimore Ravens – Game summary

Quarter	1	2	3	4	Total
Jaguars	6	6	0	0	**12**
**Ravens**	7	3	7	3	**20**

at M&T Bank Stadium, Baltimore, Maryland

- Date: December 14, 2014
- Game time: 1:00 p.m. EST
- Game weather: Mostly cloudy, chilly, 47 °F (8 °C)
- Game attendance: 70,801
- Referee: Tony Corrente
- TV announcers (CBS): Tom McCarthy, Adam Archuleta, and Allie LaForce
- Recap, Game Book

Game information

**First quarter**

- BAL – Kamar Aiken 11-yard return of blocked punt (Justin Tucker kick), 11:52. Ravens 7-0.
- JAX – Josh Scobee 53-yard field goal, 9:33. Ravens 7-3. **Drive: 7 plays, 31 yards, 2:19.**
- JAX – Josh Scobee 45-yard field goal, 1:18. Ravens 7-6. **Drive: 12 plays, 62 yards, 6:42.**

**Second quarter**

- JAX – Josh Scobee 53-yard field goal, 11:33. Jaguars 9-7. **Drive: 4 plays, -2 yards, 2:01.**
- BAL – Justin Tucker 22-yard field goal, 3:45. Ravens 10-9. **Drive: 10 plays, 65 yards, 5:20.**
- JAX – Josh Scobee 45-yard field goal, 0:04. Jaguars 12-10. **Drive: 4 plays, 29 yards, 0:36.**

**Third quarter**

- BAL – Owen Daniels 3-yard pass from Joe Flacco (Justin Tucker kick), 8:34. Ravens 17–12. **Drive: 6 plays, 80 yards, 3:19.**

**Fourth quarter**

- BAL – Justin Tucker 33-yard field goal, 1:11. Ravens 20-12. **Drive: 8 plays, 49 yards, 2:10.**

**Top passers**

- JAX – Blake Bortles – 21/37, 210 yards, INT
- BAL – Joe Flacco – 20/30, 221 yards, TD

**Top rushers**

- JAX – Toby Gerhart – 13 rushes, 54 yards
- BAL – Justin Forsett – 16 rushes, 48 yards

**Top receivers**

- JAX – Cecil Shorts – 6 receptions, 76 yards
- BAL – Marlon Brown – 5 receptions, 66 yards

**Top tacklers**

- JAX – Johnathan Cyprien – 4 tackles, 5 assists, 1 pass defended
- BAL – Asa Jackson – 5 tackles, 3 assists, 2 passes defended

==== Week 16: vs. Tennessee Titans ====
Week Sixteen: Tennessee Titans at Jacksonville Jaguars – Game summary

Quarter	1	2	3	4	Total
Titans	7	3	0	3	**13**
**Jaguars**	0	7	7	7	**21**

at EverBank Field, Jacksonville, Florida

- Date: December 18, 2014
- Game time: 8:30 p.m. EST
- Game weather: 58 °F (14 °C)
- Game attendance: 61,202
- Referee: Clete Blakeman
- TV announcers (NFLN): Jim Nantz, Phil Simms, and Tracy Wolfson
- Recap, Game Book

Game information

**First quarter**

- TEN – Leon Washington 8-yard pass from Charlie Whitehurst (Ryan Succop kick), 7:23. Titans 7–0. **Drive: 12 plays, 84 yards, 7:37.**

**Second quarter**

- TEN – Ryan Succop 50-yard field goal, 3:46. Titans 10–0. **Drive: 8 plays, 38 yards, 4:12.**
- JAX – Marcedes Lewis 4-yard pass from Blake Bortles (Josh Scobee kick), 0:31. Titans 10–7. **Drive: 11 plays, 80 yards, 3:15.**

**Third quarter**

- JAX – Toby Gerhart 1-yard run (Josh Scobee kick), 9:27. Jaguars 14–10. **Drive: 11 plays, 72 yards, 5:11.**

**Fourth quarter**

- JAX – Jordan Todman 62-yard run (Josh Scobee kick), 9:13. Jaguars 21–10. **Drive: 1 play, 62 yards, 0:11.**
- TEN – Ryan Succop 23-yard field goal, 6:06. Jaguars 21–13. **Drive: 8 plays, 75 yards, 3:07.**

**Top passers**

- TEN – Charlie Whitehurst – 24/35, 287 yards, TD
- JAX – Blake Bortles – 13/26, 115 yards, TD

**Top rushers**

- TEN – Bishop Sankey – 14 rushes, 44 yards
- JAX – Jordan Todman – 5 rushes, 71 yards, TD

**Top receivers**

- TEN – Kendall Wright – 4 receptions, 73 yards
- JAX – Marqise Lee – 4 receptions, 65 yards

**Top tacklers**

- TEN – George Wilson – 6 tackles
- JAX – Telvin Smith – 10 tackles, 5 assists

==== Week 17: at Houston Texans ====
Week Seventeen: Jacksonville Jaguars at Houston Texans – Game summary

Quarter	1	2	3	4	Total
Jaguars	10	0	7	0	**17**
**Texans**	7	7	0	9	**23**

at NRG Stadium, Houston, Texas

- Date: December 28, 2014
- Game time: 12:00 p.m. CST
- Game weather: None (retractable roof closed)
- Game attendance: 71,777
- Referee: John Parry
- TV announcers (Fox): Chris Myers, Ronde Barber, and Jennifer Hale
- Recap, Game Book

Game information

**First quarter**

- HOU – Arian Foster 10-yard pass from Case Keenum (Randy Bullock kick), 10:23. Texans 7–0. **Drive: 5 plays, 83 yards, 2:30.**
- JAX – Josh Scobee 53-yard field goal, 6:02. Texans 7–3. **Drive: 8 plays, 54 yards, 4:21.**
- JAX – Dwayne Gratz 55-yard interception return (Josh Scobee kick), 2:55. Jaguars 10–7.

**Second quarter**

- HOU – Alfred Blue 11-yard run (Randy Bullock kick), 6:34. Texans 14–10. **Drive: 14 plays, 74 yards, 6:45.**

**Third quarter**

- JAX – Jordan Todman 23-yard pass from Cecil Shorts (Josh Scobee kick), 4:45. Jaguars 17–14. **Drive: 1 play, 23 yards, 0:07.**

**Fourth quarter**

- HOU – Andre Johnson 8-yard pass from Case Keenum (Randy Bullock kick), 4:45. Texans 21–17. **Drive: 12 plays, 80 yards, 6:11.**
- HOU – Blake Bortles sacked in the end zone by J. J. Watt for safety, 5:37. Texans 23–17.

**Top passers**

- JAX – Blake Bortles – 14/33, 117 yards
- HOU – Case Keenum – 25/35, 250 yards, 2 TD, INT

**Top rushers**

- JAX – Blake Bortles – 3 rushes, 61 yards
- HOU – Jonathan Grimes – 11 rushes, 45 yards

**Top receivers**

- JAX – Cecil Shorts – 5 receptions, 47 yards
- HOU – Andre Johnson – 10 receptions, 134 yards, TD

**Top tacklers**

- JAX – Telvin Smith – 11 tackles, 5 assists
- HOU – J. J. Watt – 6 tackles, 3 sacks, 1 forced fumble

=== Standings ===
==== Division ====
AFC South
	W	L	T	PCT	DIV	CONF	PF	PA	STK
^{(4)} Indianapolis Colts	11	5	0	.688	6–0	9–3	458	369	W1
Houston Texans	9	7	0	.563	4–2	8–4	372	307	W2
Jacksonville Jaguars	3	13	0	.188	1–5	2–10	249	412	L1
Tennessee Titans	2	14	0	.125	1–5	2–10	254	438	L10

==== Conference ====
AFC
#	Team	Division	W	L	T	PCT	DIV	CONF	SOS	SOV	STK
**Division leaders**
1 (Note: New England defeated Denver head-to-head (Week 9, 43–21).)	New England Patriots	East	12	4	0	.750	4–2	9–3	.514	.487	L1
2	Denver Broncos	West	12	4	0	.750	6–0	10–2	.521	.484	W1
3 (Note: Pittsburgh defeated Indianapolis head-to-head (Week 8, 51–34).)	Pittsburgh Steelers	North	11	5	0	.688	4–2	9–3	.451	.486	W4
4	Indianapolis Colts	South	11	5	0	.688	6–0	9–3	.479	.372	W1
**Wild Cards**
5	Cincinnati Bengals	North	10	5	1	.656	3–3	7–5	.498	.425	L1
6	Baltimore Ravens	North	10	6	0	.625	3–3	6–6	.475	.378	W1
**Did not qualify for the postseason**
7 (Note: Kansas City finished ahead of San Diego in the AFC West based on head-to-head sweep (Week 7, 23–20; Week 17, 19–7). Houston finished ahead of Kansas City and Buffalo based on conference record. Kansas City finished ahead of Buffalo based on head-to-head victory (Week 10, 17–13). San Diego finished ahead of Buffalo based on head-to-head victory (Week 3, 22–10).)	Houston Texans	South	9	7	0	.563	4–2	8–4	.447	.299	W2
8	Kansas City Chiefs	West	9	7	0	.563	3–3	7–5	.512	.500	W1
9	San Diego Chargers	West	9	7	0	.563	2–4	6–6	.512	.403	L1
10	Buffalo Bills	East	9	7	0	.563	4–2	5–7	.516	.486	W1
11	Miami Dolphins	East	8	8	0	.500	3–3	6–6	.512	.406	L1
12	Cleveland Browns	North	7	9	0	.438	2–4	4–8	.479	.371	L5
13	New York Jets	East	4	12	0	.250	1–5	4–8	.543	.375	W1
14 (Note: Jacksonville finished ahead of Oakland based on record vs. common opponents (1–4 to 0–5).)	Jacksonville Jaguars	South	3	13	0	.188	1–5	2–10	.514	.313	L1
15	Oakland Raiders	West	3	13	0	.188	1–5	2–10	.570	.542	L1
16	Tennessee Titans	South	2	14	0	.125	1–5	2–10	.506	.375	L10
**Tiebreakers** (Note: When breaking ties for three or more teams under the NFL's rules, they are first broken within divisions, then comparing only the highest ranked remaining team from each division.)
