= Johnathan Cyprien =

American football player (born 1990)

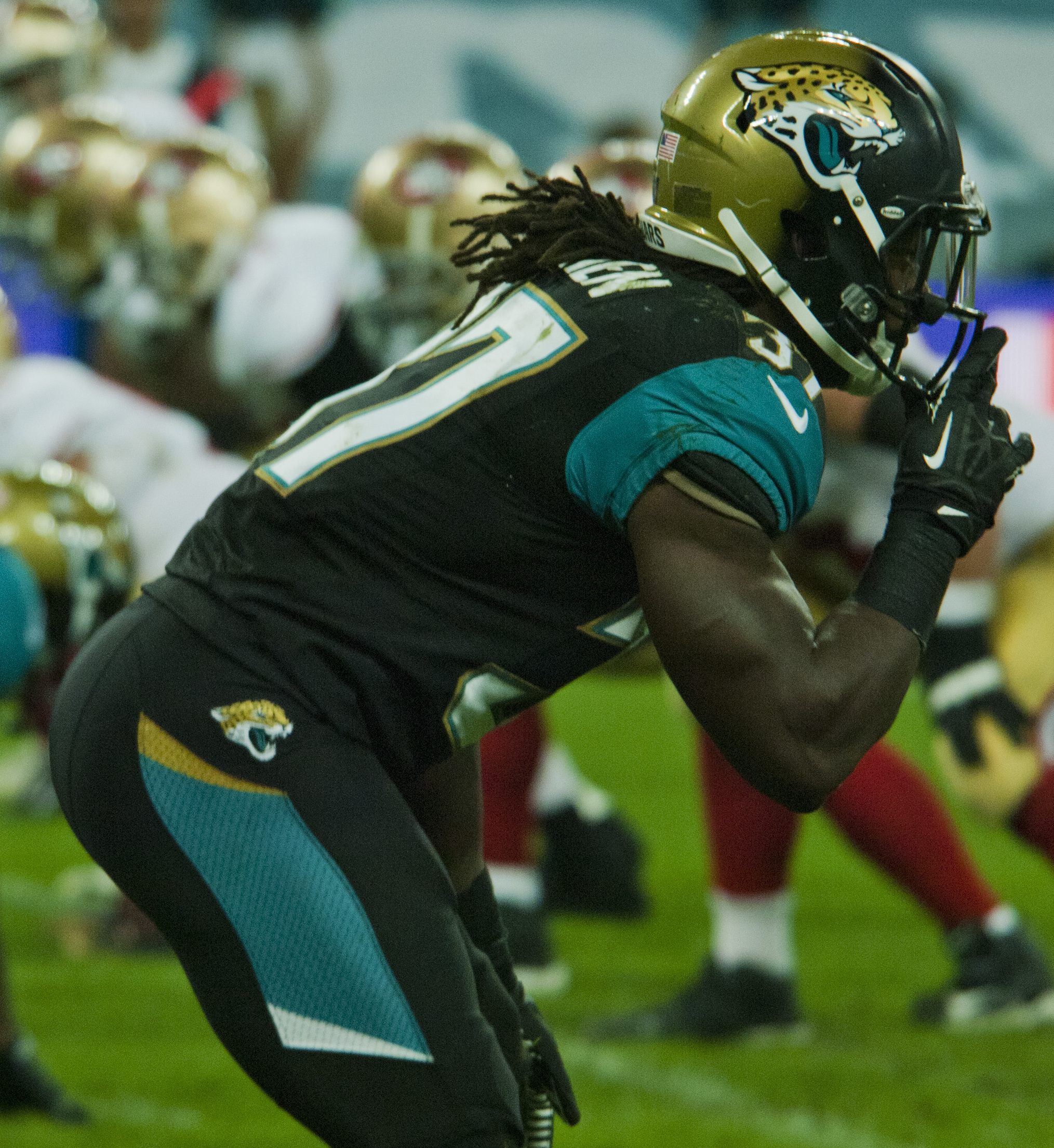
- Cyprien with the Jacksonville Jaguars in 2013

No. 37, 32
- Position: Safety

Personal information
- Born: July 29, 1990 (age 36); North Miami Beach, Florida, U.S.
- Listed height: 6 ft 1 in (1.85 m)
- Listed weight: 211 lb (96 kg)

Career information
- High school: North Miami Beach
- College: FIU (2009–2012)
- NFL draft: 2013: 2nd round, 33rd overall pick

Career history
- Jacksonville Jaguars (2013–2016); Tennessee Titans (2017–2018); Philadelphia Eagles (2019); Atlanta Falcons (2019); San Francisco 49ers (2020)

Awards and highlights
- First-team All-Sun Belt (2012); 2× Second-team All-Sun Belt (2010, 2011)

Career NFL statistics
- Total tackles: 515
- Sacks: 3.0
- Forced fumbles: 5
- Fumble recoveries: 2
- Pass deflections: 16
- Interceptions: 2
- Stats at Pro Football Reference

Johnathan Ken Cyprien (born July 29, 1990) is an American former professional football player who was a safety in the National Football League (NFL). He played college football for the FIU Panthers and was selected by the Jacksonville Jaguars in the second round of the 2013 NFL draft. Cyprien also played for the Tennessee Titans, Philadelphia Eagles, Atlanta Falcons, and San Francisco 49ers.

== Early life and college ==
Cyprien attended North Miami Beach High School in North Miami Beach, Florida. He served as team captain as a senior and was also named to the Miami Herald All-Dade and District 12-6A first-team. Cyprien received an athletic scholarship to attend Florida International University, where he played for the FIU Panthers football team from 2009 to 2012.

As a true freshman in 2009, Cyprien appeared in all 12 games and started seven. He finished second on the team with 78 tackles, an interception, three pass deflections, and two forced fumbles. Cyprien earned an all-conference honorable mention selection.

In 2010, Cyprien led the team with 113 tackles, the fourth-best single-season total in FIU history. He also recorded three tackles for loss, ann interception, six pass deflections, forced three fumbles, and recovered a fumble, and earned second-team all-conference honors.

As a junior in 2011, Cyprien started in all 13 games. He recorded 81 tackles (third-highest on the team), along with 5.5 tackles for loss and a team-high eight passes broken up, which was tied for third all-time in a season in program history, and he earned second-team all-conference honors.

As a senior in 2012, Cyprien served as one of the team captains and is widely regarded as the top safety to ever play at FIU. Cyprien once again led the team in tackles in 2012 with 93 and also recorded a team-high four interceptions, five pass deflections, 3.5 tackles for loss, and a forced fumble. He started all 12 games, as well as every game the past three seasons (2010–12), and has started the most career games at safety at FIU (45), which is the third-most number of starts at any position for a Panther. Cyprien set the school record for total tackles (365), solo tackles (213) and fumbles forced (six). He also ranks among the all-time best for pass breakups (second, 22), interceptions (fourth, 7), and fumbles recovered (fourth, 3).

Cyprien majored in physical therapy.

== Professional career ==
=== Pre-draft ===
On December 14, 2012, it was announced that Cyprien had accepted an invitation to play in the 2013 Senior Bowl. Throughout Senior Bowl practices, he impressed many scouts and analysts with his enthusiasm and aggressive style. On January 26, 2013, Cyprien played in the Reese's Senior Bowl and recorded five combined tackles and was a part of Oakland Raiders' head coach Dennis Allen's North team that lost 21–16 to the South. Cyprien was one of 60 collegiate defensive backs to attend the NFL Scouting Combine in Indianapolis, Indiana. He was unable to compete and perform any physical drills due to a shoulder and hamstring injury. On March 7, 2013, Cyprien attended FIU's pro day and performed all of the combine and positional drills for scouts and team representatives from all 32 NFL teams. His 18 reps in the bench press would've finished third among all defensive backs at the combine. During the draft process, Cyprien had private workouts and meetings with over 12 NFL teams, including the Cincinnati Bengals, Cleveland Browns, Jacksonville Jaguars, Washington Redskins, Atlanta Falcons, Carolina Panthers, Dallas Cowboys, Miami Dolphins, Arizona Cardinals, Tennessee Titans, San Francisco 49ers, and Houston Texans. At the conclusion of the pre-draft process, he was projected by NFL draft experts and scouts to be a first or second round pick. Cyprien was ranked the top strong safety prospect in the draft by NFLDraftScout.com, the second best by NFL draft analyst Josh Norris, the third best by Sports Illustrated, and the fourth best by NFL analyst Mike Mayock.

Pre-draft measurables
Height	Weight	Arm length	Hand span	40-yard dash	10-yard split	20-yard split	20-yard shuttle	Three-cone drill	Vertical jump	Broad jump	Bench press
6 ft 0 1/4 in (1.84 m)	217 lb (98 kg)	31 3/4 in (0.81 m)	10 1/4 in (0.26 m)	4.64 s	1.52 s	2.65 s	4.44 s	7.01 s	38 1/2 in (0.98 m)	9 ft 11 in (3.02 m)	18 reps
All values from NFL Combine/FIU's Pro Day

=== Jacksonville Jaguars ===
==== 2013 season ====
The Jaguars selected Cyprien in the second round (33rd overall) of the 2013 NFL draft. He was the fourth safety selected in 2013. Cyprien became the fifth player drafted from FIU and the highest NFL draft pick in school history, a distinction previously held by T. Y. Hilton who was selected in the third round (92nd overall) of the 2012 NFL draft. On June 18, 2013, Cyprien signed a four-year, $5.46 million contract with $3.91 million guaranteed and a signing bonus of $2.35 million.

Cyprien entered training camp slated as the starting strong safety after Dawan Landry departed for the New York Jets during free agency. Although he suffered a hamstring injury, head coach Gus Bradley officially named him the starter to begin the regular season.

Cyprien made his first career start and professional regular-season debut in the season-opener against the Kansas City Chiefs and made three combined tackles during the 28–2 loss. Two weeks later, Cyprien recorded seven combined tackles and made his first career sack on Seattle Seahawks' quarterback Russell Wilson as the Jaguars lost 45–17. In Week 5, he collected a season-high 13 solo tackles in 34–20 loss at the St. Louis Rams. On December 1, 2013, Cyprien collected ten combined tackles, deflected a pass, and made the first interception of his career off of Cleveland Browns' quarterback Brandon Weeden in a 32–28 victory. His interception came in the second quarter as he picked off a pass intended for Jordan Cameron and returned it for 27 yards. He missed a Week 15 matchup against the Buffalo Bills due to a hamstring injury.

Cyprien finished his rookie year with 104 combined tackles (87 solo), six pass deflections, an interception, and a sack in 15 games and starts.

==== 2014 season ====
Cyprien remained the starting strong safety in 2014 and started the season-opener against the Philadelphia Eagles but was unable to finish the 34–17 loss after suffering a concussion while attempting to intercept a pass. He missed the Jaguars' Week 2 matchup at the Washington Redskins after he was not cleared to participate and remained in concussion protocol. On October 12, 2014, Cyprien recorded a season-high 15 combined tackles in a 16–14 loss to the Tennessee Titans. During Week 8, he made ten solo tackles in a 27–13 loss to the Miami Dolphins.

Cyprien finished his second professional season with 114 combined tackles (80 solo) and three pass deflections in 15 games and starts.

==== 2015 season ====
Throughout training camp, Cyprien saw competition from Josh Evans for his starting strong safety position. Head coach Gus Bradley named Cyprien the starting strong safety, opposite Sergio Brown, to start the 2015 season.

Cyprien started the season-opener against the Carolina Panthers and recorded four combined tackles before leaving the 20–9 loss with a calf injury. He missed the next two games due to the injury. On October 4, 2015, Cyprien made 14 combined tackles during a 16–13 loss at the Indianapolis Colts. On December 13, 2015, he made six combined tackles, intercepted a pass from Andrew Luck, and returned it for 48 yards during a 51–16 victory over the Indianapolis Colts. In Week 17, Cyprien tied his season-high of 14 combined tackles as the Jaguars lost on the road 30–6 to the Houston Texans.

Cyprien finished the season with 108 combined tackles (78 solo), two passes defended, and an interception in 14 games and starts as the Jaguars finished the season with a 5–11 record and third in the AFC South.

==== 2016 season ====
During training camp, Cyprien competed against James Sample to maintain his starting strong safety position. He was named the starting strong safety, opposite newly acquired free safety Tashaun Gipson.

In Week 12, Cyprien recorded six combined tackles and sacked Buffalo Bills' quarterback Tyrod Taylor during a 28–21 loss. Two weeks later, he made 14 combined tackles as the Jaguars lost to the Minnesota Vikings by a score of 25–16. In the next game, Cyprien recorded a career-high 17 combined tackles as the Jaguars lost to the Houston Texans on the road by a score of 21–20. Head coach Gus Bradley was fired after Week 15 due to the Jaguars posting a 2–12 record. Cyprien finished the 2016 season with a career-high 127 combined tackles (96 solo), four pass deflections, and a sack in 16 games and starts. It was his first season starting and playing in all 16 games. Cyprien had a career year due to the emergence of Tashaun Gipson as a capable free safety that allowed Cyprien to play closer to the line in the box. It also allowed him to lead the NFL with 27 run stops in 2016.

=== Tennessee Titans ===
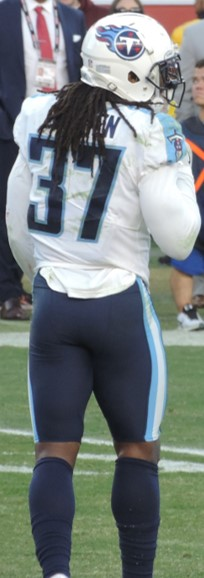
Cyprien in 2017

On March 9, 2017, the Tennessee Titans signed Cyprien to a four-year, $25 million contract with $7 million guaranteed and a signing bonus of $3 million.

==== 2017 season ====
Head coach Mike Mularkey named Cyprien the starting strong safety to begin the season, alongside free safety Kevin Byard. Cyprien started in the season-opener against the Oakland Raiders and recorded seven combined tackles before leaving the 26–16 loss with a hamstring injury that sidelined him for the next six games (Weeks 2–7). On November 16, 2017, he made 10 combined tackles in a 40–17 road loss to the Pittsburgh Steelers. Three weeks later, Cyprien made 10 combined tackles and sacked Arizona Cardinals quarterback Blaine Gabbert in the 12–7 road loss.

Cyprien finished his first season with the Titans with 57 combined tackles (38 solo), a sack, and a pass deflection in 10 games and starts. The Titans finished second in the AFC South with a 9–7 record and qualified for the playoffs. On January 6, 2018, Cyprien started his first career playoff game and recorded four solo tackles and a pass deflection in the narrow 22–21 victory at the Kansas City Chiefs in the AFC Wildcard game. The following week, Cyprien made seven combined tackles as the Titans lost in the AFC Divisional round to the New England Patriots by a score of 35–14.

==== 2018 season ====
On August 1, 2018, Cyprien tore his ACL on a non-contact play during training camp and was placed on injured reserve the next day, prematurely ending his season.

On March 11, 2019, Cyprien was released by the Titans after Kenny Vaccaro was signed to a multi-year deal.

=== Philadelphia Eagles ===
On August 2, 2019, Cyprien signed a one-year contract with the Philadelphia Eagles.

=== Atlanta Falcons ===
On September 30, 2019, Cyprien was traded to the Atlanta Falcons for linebacker Duke Riley and a swap of late-round picks. He was placed on injured reserve eight days later. Cyprien played in five games and started one total for both the Eagles and Falcons in the 2019 season.

=== San Francisco 49ers ===
On August 20, 2020, Cyprien signed with the San Francisco 49ers. He was released on September 5, and signed to the practice squad the next day. Cyprien was elevated to the active roster on October 24, October 31, and November 5 for the team's Weeks 7, 8, and 9 games against the New England Patriots, Seattle Seahawks, and Green Bay Packers, and reverted to the practice squad after each game. He was then promoted to the active roster on November 9. Cyprien was placed on injured reserve on November 17, and waived from injured reserve on December 15. He played in four games in the 2020 season mainly in a special teams role.

=== Retirement ===
Cyprien signed a one-day deal with Jacksonville to retire as a Jaguar on March 7, 2024.

== Career statistics ==
=== NFL ===
==== Regular season ====
Year	Team	Games		Tackles				Interceptions						Fumbles			
Year	Team	GP	GS	Comb	Total	Ast	Sack	PD	Int	Yds	Avg	Lng	TD	FF	FR	Yds	TD
2013	JAX	15	15	103	86	17	1.0	6	1	27	27.0	27	0	2	0	0	0
2014	JAX	15	15	114	80	34	0.0	3	0	0	0.0	0	0	0	0	0	0
2015	JAX	14	14	108	78	30	0.0	2	1	48	48.0	48	0	1	1	0	0
2016	JAX	16	16	127	96	31	1.0	4	0	0	0.0	0	0	1	1	0	0
2017	TEN	10	10	57	38	19	1.0	1	0	0	0.0	0	0	0	0	0	0
2018	TEN	0	0	Did not play due to injury													
2019	PHI	4	0	2	1	1	0.0	0	0	0	0.0	0	0	0	0	0	0
2019	ATL	1	1	2	1	1	0.0	0	0	0	0.0	0	0	0	0	0	0
2020	SF	4	0	2	1	1	0.0	0	0	0	0.0	0	0	1	0	0	0
Career		79	71	515	381	134	3.0	16	2	75	37.5	48	0	5	2	0	0

==== Postseason ====
Year	Team	Games		Tackles				Interceptions						Fumbles			
Year	Team	GP	GS	Comb	Total	Ast	Sack	PD	Int	Yds	Avg	Lng	TD	FF	FR	Yds	TD
2017	TEN	2	2	11	10	1	0.0	1	0	0	0	0.0	0	0	0	0	0
Career		2	2	11	10	1	0.0	1	0	0	0	0.0	0	0	0	0	0

=== College ===
Year	Team	Games	Tackles					Interceptions			
Year	Team	Games	Solo	Ast	Total	Loss	Sack	INT	Yds	Avg	TD
2009	FIU	12	48	30	78	1.5	0.0	1	0	0.0	0
2010	FIU	13	60	50	113	3.0	0.0	1	0	0.0	0
2011	FIU	13	48	33	81	5.5	1.0	1	9	9.0	1
2012	FIU	12	54	39	93	3.5	0.0	4	32	8.0	0
Career		50	213	152	365	13.5	1.0	7	41	5.9	1

== Personal life ==
Cyprien has four siblings: Clay, Schnider, Sheena, and Christina. He started the CypSquad ARY Foundation in 2015, which benefits different programs for at-risk youth in the South Florida area. Cyprien is a snorkeling enthusiast and is working on his scuba certification. Additionally, Cyprien has a burgeoning career in real estate. He supplements his football earnings by investing in real estate, owning 13 properties in the Nashville, Jacksonville, and Miami areas as of 2018. Cyprien appeared in the Season 1, Episode 3 titled "Humble Baddies" of the Netflix original series W.A.G.s To Riches.
