= List of Jacksonville Jaguars starting quarterbacks =

These quarterbacks have started at least one game for the Jacksonville Jaguars of the National Football League (NFL).

== Seasons ==
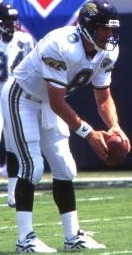
Mark Brunell (1995–2003)

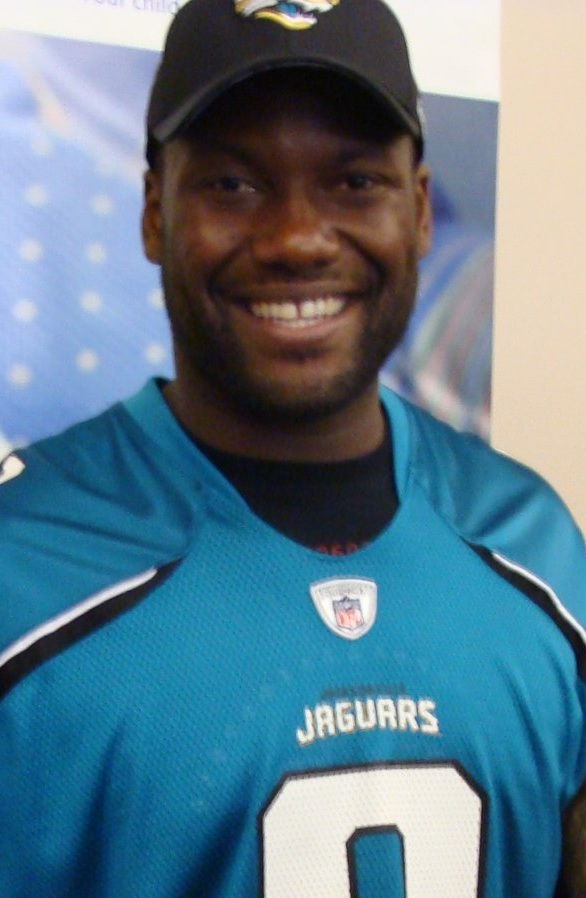
David Garrard (2002–2011)

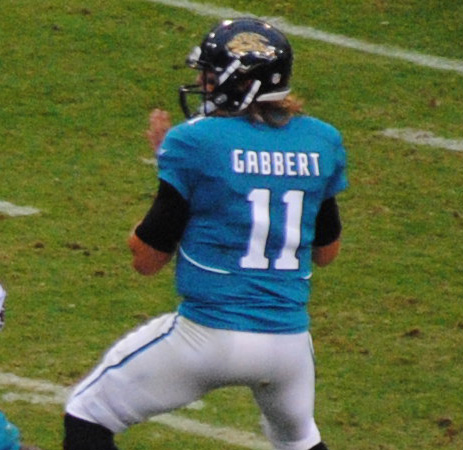
Blaine Gabbert (2011–2013)

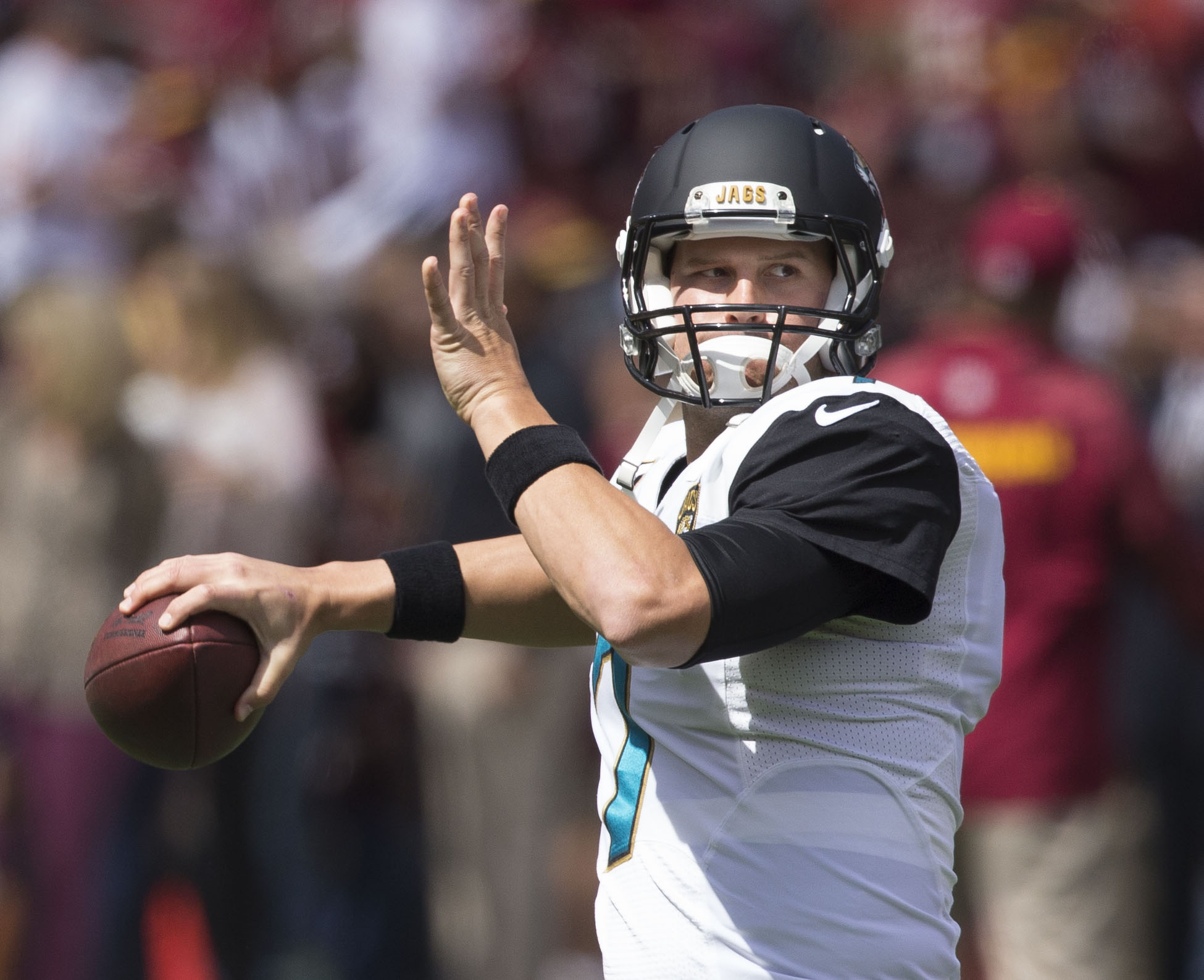
Chad Henne (2012–2014)

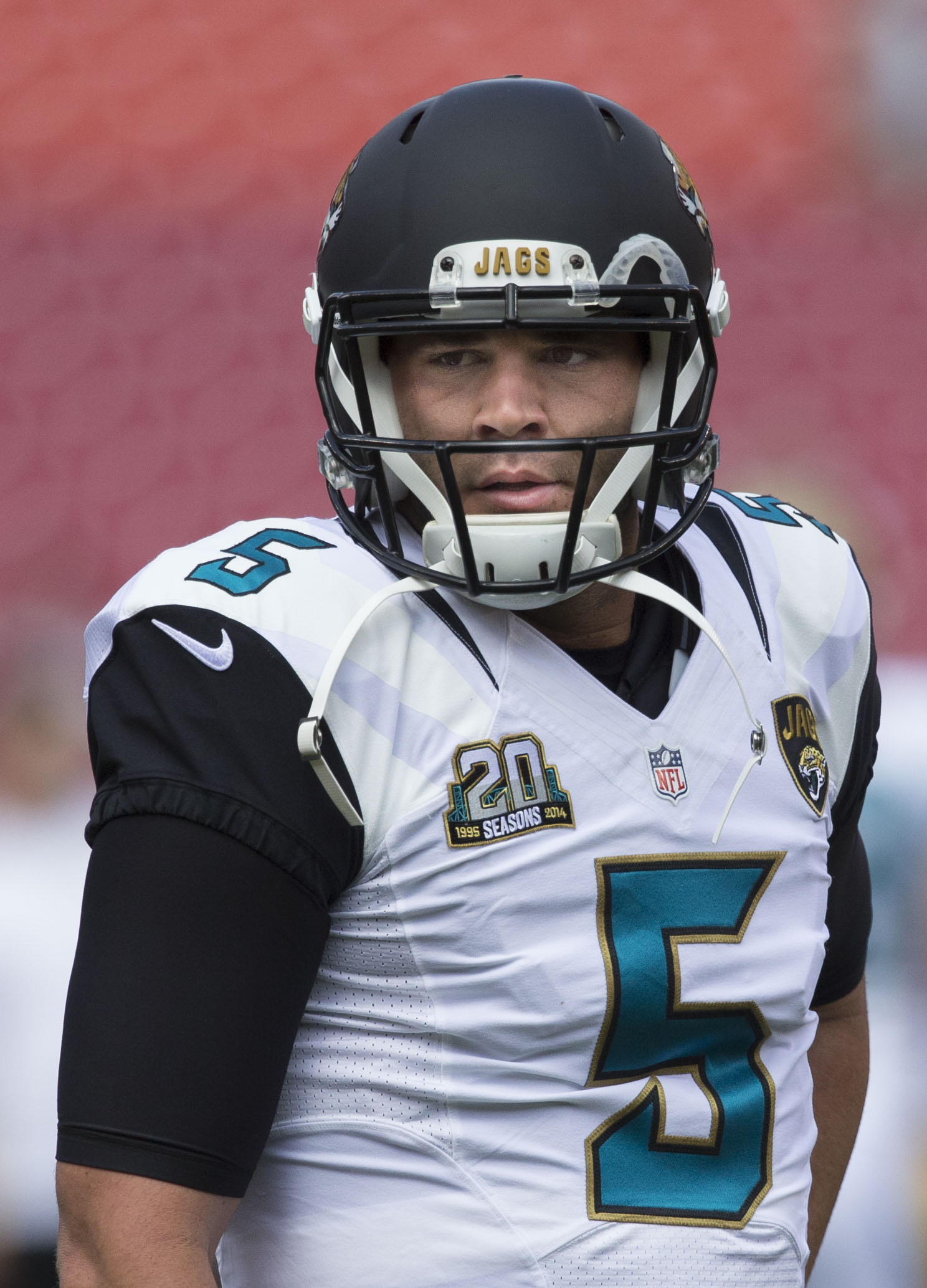
Blake Bortles (2014–2018)

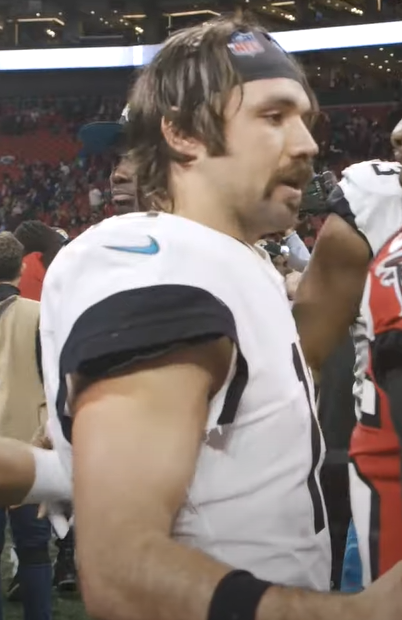
Gardner Minshew (2019–2020)

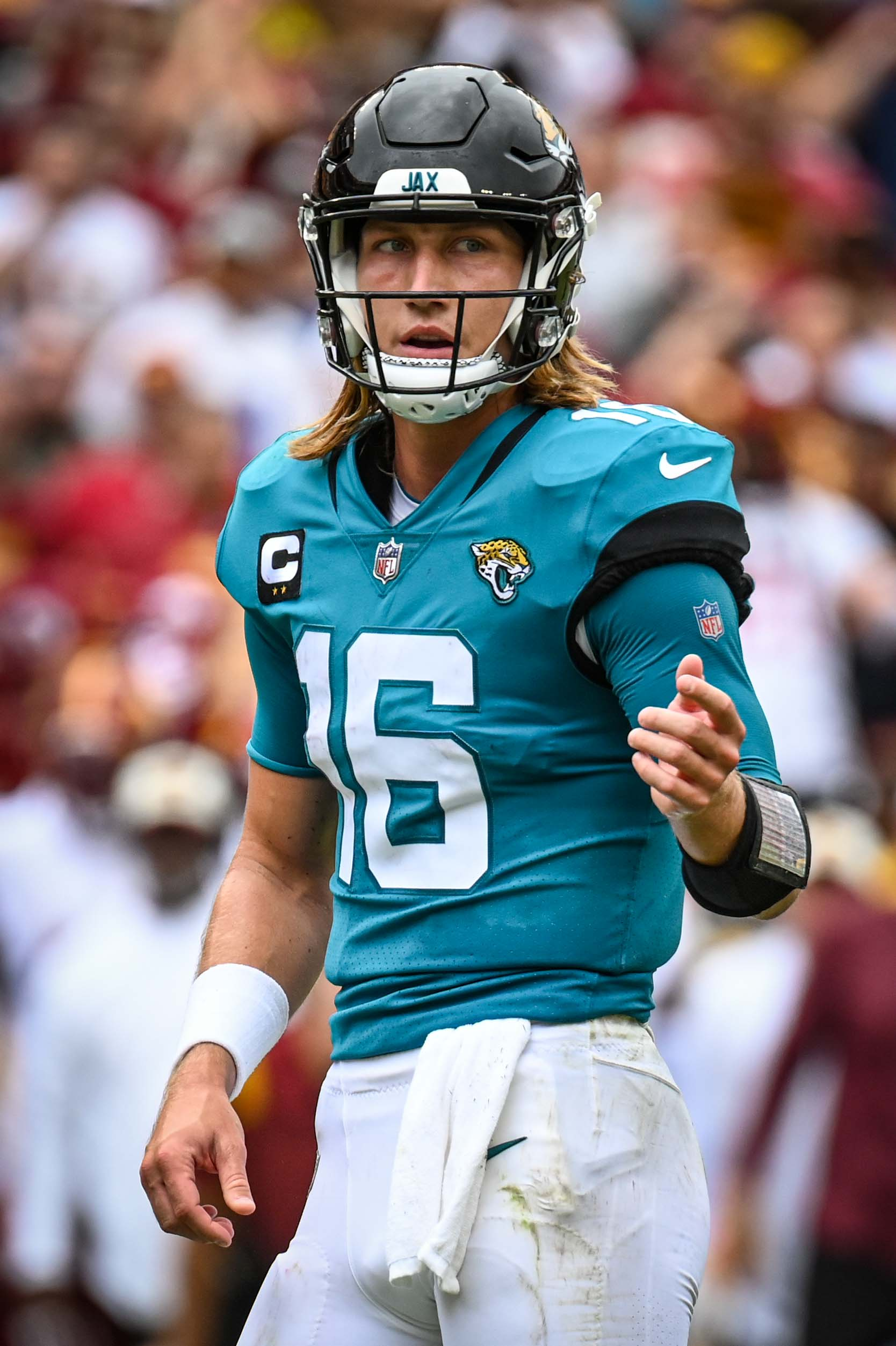
Trevor Lawrence (2021–present)

The number of games they started during the season is listed to the right:

Season	Regular season	Postseason	Ref.
1995	Mark Brunell (3–7) / Steve Beuerlein (1–5)		
1996	Mark Brunell (9–7)	Mark Brunell (2–1)	
1997	Mark Brunell (9–5) / Steve Matthews (1–0) / Rob Johnson (1–0)	Mark Brunell (0–1)	
1998	Mark Brunell (10–3) / Jonathan Quinn (1–1) / Jamie Martin (0–1)	Mark Brunell (1–1)	
1999	Mark Brunell (13–2) / Jay Fiedler (1–0)	Mark Brunell (1–1)	
2000	Mark Brunell (7–9)		
2001	Mark Brunell (6–9) / Jonathan Quinn (0–1)		
2002	Mark Brunell (6–9) / David Garrard (0–1)		
2003	Byron Leftwich (5–8) / Mark Brunell (0–3)		
2004	Byron Leftwich (8–6) / David Garrard (1–1)		
2005	Byron Leftwich (8–3) / David Garrard (4–1)	Byron Leftwich (0–1)	
2006	David Garrard (5–5) / Byron Leftwich (3–3)		
2007	David Garrard (9–3) / Quinn Gray (2–2)	David Garrard (1–1)	
2008	David Garrard (5–11)		
2009	David Garrard (7–9)		
2010	David Garrard (8–6) / Todd Bouman (0–1) / Trent Edwards (0–1)		
2011	Blaine Gabbert (4–10) / Luke McCown (1–1)		
2012	Blaine Gabbert (1–9) / Chad Henne (1–5)		
2013	Chad Henne (4–9) / Blaine Gabbert (0–3)		
2014	Blake Bortles (3–10) / Chad Henne (0–3)		
2015	Blake Bortles (5–11)		
2016	Blake Bortles (3–13)		
2017	Blake Bortles (10–6)	Blake Bortles (2–1)	
2018	Blake Bortles (3–9) / Cody Kessler (2–2)		
2019	Gardner Minshew (6–6) / Nick Foles (0–4)		
2020	Gardner Minshew (1–7) / Mike Glennon (0–5) / Jake Luton (0–3)		
2021	Trevor Lawrence (3–14)		
2022	Trevor Lawrence (9–8)	Trevor Lawrence (1–1)	
2023	Trevor Lawrence (8–8) / C. J. Beathard (1–0)		
2024	Trevor Lawrence (2–8) / Mac Jones (2–5)		
2025	Trevor Lawrence (13–4)	Trevor Lawrence (0–1)	
2026	Trevor Lawrence (1–1)		

== Most games as starting quarterback ==
These quarterbacks have started for the Jaguars in regular season games (through the 2026 NFL season).

GP	Games played
GS	Games started
W	Number of wins as starting quarterback
L	Number of losses as starting quarterback
T	Number of ties as starting quarterback
Pct	Winning percentage as starting quarterback

Name	Period	GP	GS	W	L	T	%
Mark Brunell	1995–2003	120	117	63	54	—	.538
Trevor Lawrence	2021–2025	79	79	36	43	—	.456
David Garrard	2002–2010	86	76	39	37	—	.513
Blake Bortles	2014–2018	75	73	24	49	—	.329
Byron Leftwich	2003–2006	46	44	24	20	—	.545
Blaine Gabbert	2011–2013	28	27	5	22	—	.185
Chad Henne	2012–2014	31	22	5	17	—	.227
Gardner Minshew	2019–2020	23	20	7	13	—	.350
Mac Jones	2024	10	7	2	5	–	.286
Steve Beuerlein	1995	7	6	1	5	—	.166
Mike Glennon	2020	5	5	0	5	—	.000
Quinn Gray	2005–2007	11	4	2	2	—	.500
Cody Kessler	2018	5	4	2	2	—	.500
Nick Foles	2019	4	4	0	4	—	.000
Jonathan Quinn	1998, 2000–2001	11	3	1	2	—	.333
Jake Luton	2020	3	3	0	3	—	.000
Luke McCown	2009–2011	8	2	1	1	—	.500
Rob Johnson	1995–1997	8	1	1	0	—	1.000
Steve Matthews	1997	2	1	1	0	—	1.000
C. J. Beathard	2021–2023	13	1	1	0	–	1.000
Jamie Martin	1998, 2000	4	1	0	1	—	.000
Jay Fiedler	1999	7	1	1	0	—	1.000
Todd Bouman	2010	1	1	0	1	—	.000
Trent Edwards	2010	3	1	0	1	—	.000

== Career statistics ==
(Through the 2026 NFL season)(Ordered By Passing Yards)

Name	Comp	Att	%	Yds	TD	Int
Mark Brunell	2,184	3,616	60.4	25,698	144	86
Trevor Lawrence	1,664	2,646	62.9	18,256	102	59
Blake Bortles	1,561	2,632	59.3	17,646	103	75
David Garrard	1,406	2,281	61.6	16,003	89	54
Byron Leftwich	789	1,344	58.7	9,042	51	36
Chad Henne	513	891	57.5	5,817	27	26
Gardner Minshew	501	797	62.9	5,530	37	11
Blaine Gabbert	414	777	53.3	4,357	22	24
Mac Jones	171	262	65.3	1,672	8	8
Quinn Gray	101	180	56.1	1,252	12	5
Mike Glennon	111	179	62.0	1,072	7	5
Steve Beuerlein	71	142	50.0	952	4	7
Jay Fiedler	68	105	64.7	828	4	3
Jonathan Quinn	66	125	52.8	748	3	4
Nick Foles	77	117	65.8	736	3	2
Cody Kessler	85	131	64.9	709	2	2
Jamie Martin	49	78	62.8	662	4	0
Jake Luton	60	110	54.5	624	2	6
Luke McCown	42	78	53.8	418	0	8
C. J. Beathard	49	66	74.2	417	1	1
Rob Johnson	22	28	78.5	344	2	2
Trent Edwards	26	49	53.0	280	1	3
Steve Matthews	26	40	65.0	275	0	0
Todd Bouman	18	34	53.0	222	2	2

== See also ==
- List of Jacksonville Jaguars players
