= Luke Bowanko =

American football player (born 1991)

No. 70, 61, 69
- Position: Center

Personal information
- Born: June 13, 1991 (age 35); Annapolis, Maryland, U.S.
- Listed height: 6 ft 6 in (1.98 m)
- Listed weight: 305 lb (138 kg)

Career information
- High school: Centreville (Clifton, Virginia)
- College: Virginia
- NFL draft: 2014: 6th round, 205th overall pick

Career history
- Jacksonville Jaguars (2014–2016); Baltimore Ravens (2017); New England Patriots (2018)*; Washington Redskins (2018); Detroit Lions (2019)*
- * Offseason or practice squad member only

Career NFL statistics
- Games played: 47
- Games started: 18
- Stats at Pro Football Reference

Luke Bowanko (born June 13, 1991) is an American former professional football player who was a center in the National Football League (NFL). He played college football for the Virginia Cavaliers and was selected by the Jacksonville Jaguars in the sixth round of the 2014 NFL draft.

== College career ==
A 3-star offensive tackle recruit, Bowanko committed to Virginia to play college football over offers from Boston College, Cincinnati, Florida State, Syracuse, and Vanderbilt.

At Virginia, Bowanko redshirted as a freshman in 2009. In 2010, he appeared in five games as a backup right guard. Bowanko won the starting right guard job as a redshirt sophomore in 2011, starting all 13 games. He moved to center for his redshirt junior year in 2012, starting all 12 games. As a redshirt senior, Bowanko was named a team captain, and moved to left guard to begin the season; however, due to injuries along the offensive line, he returned to center after four games, where he started for the remainder of the season. Overall, Bowanko played in 42 games during his college career, starting 37 consecutive games from 2011 to 2013 (20 starts at center, 13 starts at right guard, and four starts at left guard).

== Professional career ==
=== Jacksonville Jaguars ===
Bowanko was selected 205th overall in the sixth round of the 2014 NFL draft by the Jacksonville Jaguars. The pick used to select Bowanko was traded by the San Francisco 49ers in exchange for Blaine Gabbert. He made his first career start at center in week three against the Indianapolis Colts.

Bowanko started out the 2016 season on PUP after suffering a torn labrum and was activated to the active roster on December 10, 2016, prior to Week 14.

=== Baltimore Ravens ===
On September 2, 2017, Bowanko was traded to the Baltimore Ravens. He played in all 16 games in 2017, starting one at left tackle in place of the injured Ronnie Stanley.

=== New England Patriots ===
On April 4, 2018, Bowanko signed with the New England Patriots. On September 1, 2018, Bowanko was released by the Patriots.

=== Washington Redskins ===
Bowanko signed with the Washington Redskins on November 5, 2018, following season ending injuries to starting offensive linemen Brandon Scherff, and Shawn Lauvao.

=== Detroit Lions ===
On June 10, 2019, Bowanko signed with the Detroit Lions. He was released during final roster cuts on August 30, 2019.
