= Josh Evans (defensive back) =

American football player (born 1991)

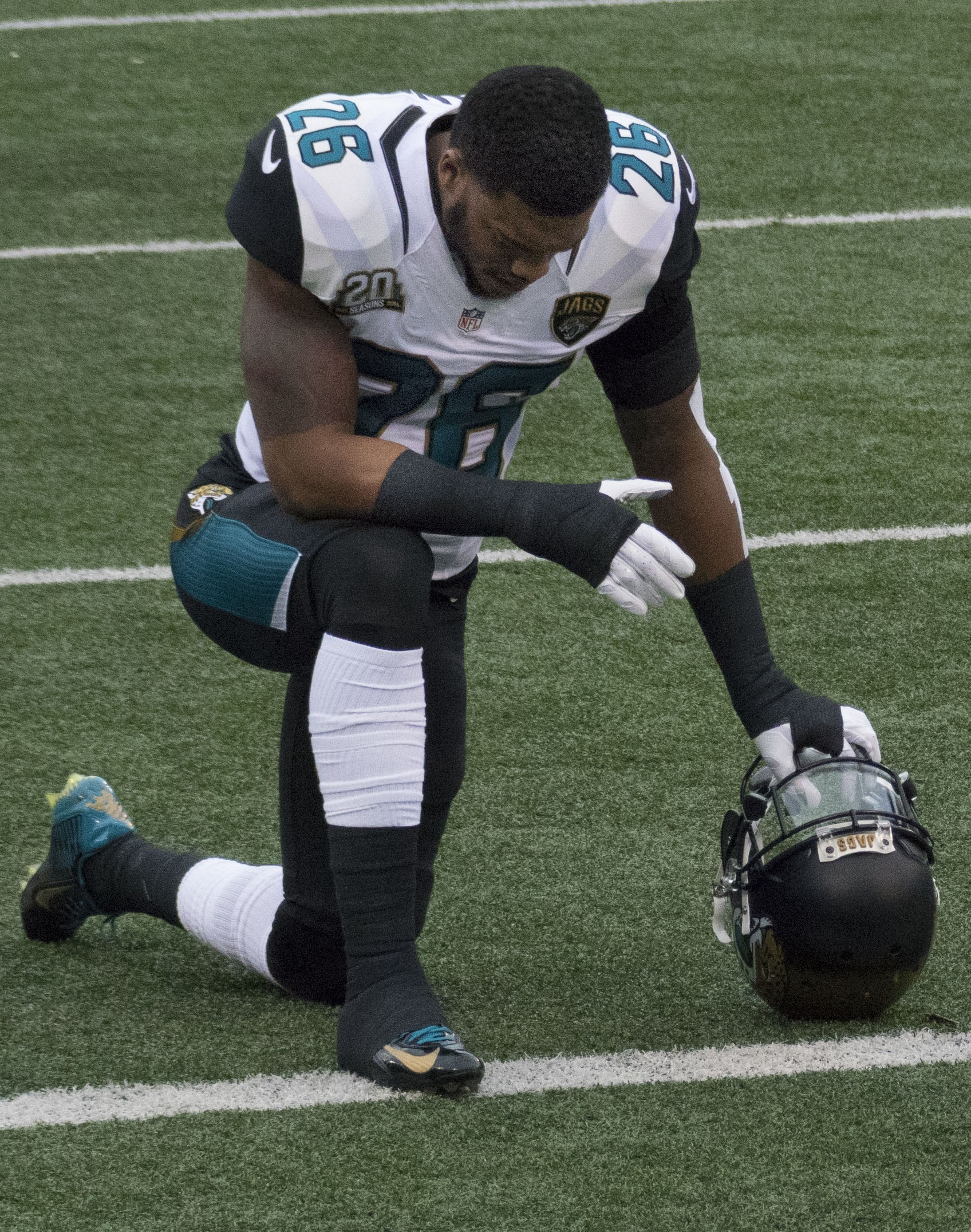
- Evans with the Jacksonville Jaguars in 2014

No. 26, 39, 45
- Position: Safety

Personal information
- Born: June 5, 1991 (age 35); Irvington, New Jersey, U.S.
- Listed height: 6 ft 0 in (1.83 m)
- Listed weight: 198 lb (90 kg)

Career information
- High school: Irvington
- College: Florida
- NFL draft: 2013: 6th round, 169th overall pick

Career history
- Jacksonville Jaguars (2013–2015); Washington Redskins (2016); Orlando Apollos (2019)

Career NFL statistics
- Total tackles: 202
- Forced fumbles: 1
- Fumble recoveries: 3
- Pass deflections: 5
- Stats at Pro Football Reference

Joshua N. Evans (born June 5, 1991) is an American former professional football player who was a safety in the National Football League (NFL). He played college football for the Florida Gators, and was selected by the Jacksonville Jaguars in the sixth round of the 2013 NFL draft.

== Early life ==
Evans attended Irvington High School in Irvington, New Jersey. He played high school football for the Irvington Blue Knights, playing on both offense and defense. He rushed for 1,403 yards and 14 touchdowns, and completed 123 of 190 pass attempts for 1,856 yards and 18 touchdowns. Evans also recorded 78 tackles and seven interceptions on defense during his senior year. Following his senior season, the Star-Ledger recognized him as he Essex County Player of the Year, and he received first-team all-state honors.

Also an standout track & field athlete, Evans competed in hurdles, relays and the jumps, and led Irvington to the New Jersey Group III state championship. At the 2008 NJSIAA Group Championships, he took silver in the 110-meter hurdles (13.91 s), placed 9th in the 200-meter dash (22.22 s) and finished 6th in the 400-meter hurdles (55.19 s). He captured the state title in the 55-meter hurdles at the 2009 NJSIAA Meet of Champions, with a PR time of 7.40 seconds. He got a personal-best time of 7.98 seconds in the 60-meter hurdles at the 2009 National Scholastic Indoor Championships, where he took 5th.

== College career ==
Evans accepted an athletic scholarship to attend the University of Florida, and played for coach Urban Meyer and coach Will Muschamp's Florida Gators football teams from 2009 to 2012. He started 24 of 47 games in which he appeared for the Gators during his four-year college career, compiling a total of 154 tackles. As a senior in 2012, he distinguished himself in the Gators' 14–7 win over the Missouri Tigers, leading the team with twelve tackles.

== Professional career ==
=== Jacksonville Jaguars ===
The Jacksonville Jaguars chose Evans in the sixth round, with the 169th overall pick, of the 2013 NFL draft. Evans officially signed with the Jaguars on July 18, 2013. Evans finished with 58 tackles as a rookie.

Evans played in all 16 games with 14 starts, recording 90 tackles in his second season.

On September 3, 2016, Evans was released by the Jaguars.

=== Washington Redskins ===
On October 5, 2016, Evans was signed by the Washington Redskins. He was released by the Redskins on October 28, 2016. He was re-signed to a two-year deal on December 28 after Donte Whitner was placed on injured reserve.

Evans was released by the Redskins on August 3, 2017.

=== Orlando Apollos ===
Evans signed with the Orlando Apollos of the Alliance of American Football (AAF) for the 2019 season. The league ceased operations in April 2019.

On August 16, 2021, Evans announced his retirement from the NFL.

== NFL career statistics ==
Legend
**Bold**	Career high

Year	Team	Games		Tackles					Interceptions					Fumbles			
Year	Team	GP	GS	Cmb	Solo	Ast	Sck	TFL	Int	Yds	TD	Lng	PD	FF	FR	Yds	TD
2013	JAX	15	11	58	47	11	0.0	0	0	0	0	0	1	0	0	0	0
2014	JAX	**16**	**14**	**90**	**62**	**28**	0.0	**2**	0	0	0	0	**2**	0	**2**	-2	0
2015	JAX	**16**	12	53	37	16	0.0	**2**	0	0	0	0	**2**	**1**	1	0	0
2016	WAS	2	0	1	0	1	0.0	0	0	0	0	0	0	0	0	0	0
		49	37	202	146	56	0.0	4	0	0	0	0	5	1	3	-2	0

== See also ==
- List of Florida Gators in the NFL draft
- List of University of Florida alumni
