= Cecil Shorts =

American football player (born 1987)

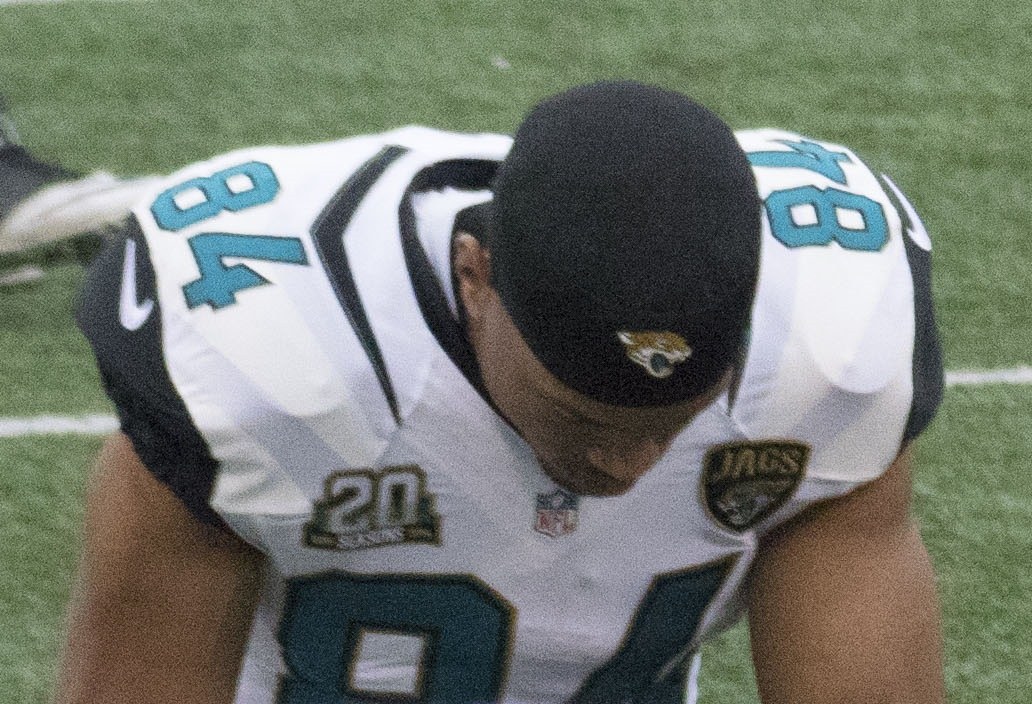
- Shorts with the Jacksonville Jaguars in 2014

No. 84, 18, 10
- Position: Wide receiver

Personal information
- Born: December 22, 1987 (age 38); Kent, Ohio, U.S.
- Listed height: 6 ft 0 in (1.83 m)
- Listed weight: 202 lb (92 kg)

Career information
- High school: Collinwood (Cleveland, Ohio)
- College: Mount Union (2006–2010)
- NFL draft: 2011: 4th round, 114th overall pick

Career history
- Jacksonville Jaguars (2011–2014); Houston Texans (2015); Tampa Bay Buccaneers (2016)

Awards and highlights
- 2× NCAA Division III national champion (2006, 2008); 2× First-team Little All-American (2009, 2010); D3Football.com Offensive Player of the Year (2009)

Career NFL statistics
- Receptions: 229
- Receiving yards: 2,979
- Receiving touchdowns: 14
- Stats at Pro Football Reference

Cecil Carlon Shorts III (born December 22, 1987) is an American former professional football player who was a wide receiver in the National Football League (NFL). He attended Collinwood High School in Cleveland, Ohio, and later played college football for the Mount Union Purple Raiders football team. He was selected by the Jacksonville Jaguars in the fourth round of the 2011 NFL draft.

== Early life ==
Shorts attended Collinwood High School in Cleveland, Ohio, where he played quarterback on the football team that his father, Cecil Shorts, Jr., coached.

== College career ==
During his freshman season at the University of Mount Union, Shorts suffered an injury that kept him from playing the entire year. In 2007, he was the backup quarterback, along with Kurt Rocco, to Greg Micheli, but was 16 of 24 passing for 209 yards, made 12 receptions, three for a touchdown, for 289 and ran for 108 yards with two touchdowns in 14 games played. Shorts switched to wide receiver after Pierre Garçon graduated, and immediately became the top receiver for Mount Union. In 2008, Shorts caught 77 passes for 1,484 yards and 23 touchdowns, which set an Ohio Athletic Conference record. Shorts helped Mount Union win their 10th NCAA Division III National Championship, at Amos Alonzo Stagg Bowl XXXVI.

In 2009, he was named the D3Football.com National Offensive Player of the Year after recording 100 receptions for 1,736 yards with 19 touchdowns. For his efforts, he earned Associated Press first-team Little All-America honors following the season. In the 2009 NCAA Division III National Football Championship on December 19, 2009, against the UW–Whitewater Warhawks, Shorts caught 10 passes for 185 yards and two touchdowns. The Purple Raiders lost, however, by a score of 38–28.

In 2010, Shorts' play was hampered by an ankle injury that prevented him from playing in three games. He finished the season with 18 receiving touchdowns, three return touchdowns and one rushing touchdown. He earned Associated Press first-team Little All-America honors for the second consecutive year following the season. Shorts had 4,705 receiving yards for 63 touchdowns in his career. He was considered a top wide receiver prospect in the 2011 NFL draft.

== Professional career ==
Pre-draft measurables
Height	Weight	Arm length	Hand span	Wingspan	40-yard dash	10-yard split	20-yard split	20-yard shuttle	Three-cone drill	Vertical jump	Broad jump	Bench press
5 ft 11 3/4 in (1.82 m)	205 lb (93 kg)	31 5/8 in (0.80 m)	9 1/4 in (0.23 m)	6 ft 1 7/8 in (1.88 m)	4.50 s	1.51 s	2.55 s	4.07 s	6.50 s	34.5 in (0.88 m)	9 ft 6 in (2.90 m)	21 reps
All values from 2011 NFL Scouting Combine/Pro Day

=== Jacksonville Jaguars ===
Shorts was selected by the Jacksonville Jaguars with the 114th overall pick (4th round) in the 2011 NFL draft. Shorts is the highest drafted player in Mount Union history and first player drafted by the Jaguars from a Division III school in franchise history. Shorts played sparingly in his rookie season, catching only two passes for 30 yards and a touchdown in 10 games. He missed the final six games in 2011 with a hamstring injury. In 2012, despite Jacksonville sharing an NFL-worst record of 2–14 with the Kansas City Chiefs, Shorts was a bright spot, leading the team in receiving yards (979), yards per reception (17.8), and touchdowns (7), with five touchdowns going for 40 yards or longer. He was placed on season-ending injured reserve on December 24, 2012, due to a concussion. In Week 3 of the 2013 season, Shorts had eight receptions for a career-high 143 yards in a loss to the Seattle Seahawks. In the 2013 season, Shorts recorded 66 catches for 777 yards and three touchdowns. He was placed on injured reserve on December 17, 2013, with a groin injury. In the 2014 season, Shorts finished with 53 receptions for 557 yards and one touchdown in 13 appearances and starts. Shorts became a free agent after the 2014 season.

=== Houston Texans ===
On March 16, 2015, Shorts signed a two-year, $6 million contract with the Houston Texans. On November 22, 2015, Shorts threw a touchdown pass to running back Alfred Blue on a trick play against the New York Jets. In the 2015 season, he finished with 42 receptions for 484 yards and two touchdowns in 11 games and four starts. On June 18, 2016, Shorts signed a pay cut reducing his salary to $1.2 million with $750,000 in bonuses. On September 3, 2016, he was released by the Texans.

=== Tampa Bay Buccaneers ===
On September 6, 2016, Shorts was signed by the Tampa Bay Buccaneers. He was placed on injured reserve on December 6, 2016, after tearing his ACL, MCL, and PCL. In the 2016 season, he appeared in nine games and made five starts. He finished with 11 receptions for 152 yards.

=== NFL statistics ===
Year	Team	GP	GS	REC	YDs	AVG	TD
2011	JAX	10	0	2	30	15.0	1
2012	JAX	14	9	55	979	17.8	7
2013	JAX	13	13	66	777	11.8	3
2014	JAX	13	12	53	557	10.5	1
2015	HOU	11	4	42	484	11.5	2
2016	TB	9	5	11	152	13.8	0
Career		70	43	229	2,979	13.0	14

== Post NFL ==
In 2025, Shorts was hired as the head football coach for Houston Christian High School. He has also served as a spokesperson for the Houston Food Bank and the United Way.
