= Nic Jacobs =

American football player (born 1991)

No. 85
- Position: Tight end

Personal information
- Born: October 13, 1991 (age 35); Many, Louisiana, U.S.
- Listed height: 6 ft 5 in (1.96 m)
- Listed weight: 295 lb (134 kg)

Career information
- High school: Many
- College: McNeese State
- NFL draft: 2014: undrafted

Career history
- New Orleans Saints (2014)*; Jacksonville Jaguars (2014–2015); Baltimore Ravens (2016)*
- * Offseason or practice squad member only

Career NFL statistics
- Receptions: 3
- Receiving yards: 22
- Receiving touchdowns: 1
- Stats at Pro Football Reference

Nicholas Cozat Marquis Jacobs (born October 13, 1991) is an American former professional football player who was a tight end in the National Football League (NFL). He was signed as an undrafted free agent by the New Orleans Saints after the 2014 NFL draft. He played college football for the McNeese State Cowboys, after transferring from the LSU Tigers.

== Professional career ==
=== New Orleans Saints ===
Following the 2014 NFL draft, Jacobs was signed by the New Orleans Saints as an undrafted free agent. He was signed to their practice squad on September 1, 2014.

=== Jacksonville Jaguars ===
On September 23, 2014, Jacobs was signed to the Jacksonville Jaguars 53-man roster. On August 30, 2016, he was released by the Jaguars.

=== Baltimore Ravens ===
On November 2, 2016, Jacobs was signed to the Baltimore Ravens' practice squad but was released three days later.
