= Blaine Gabbert =

American football player (born 1989)

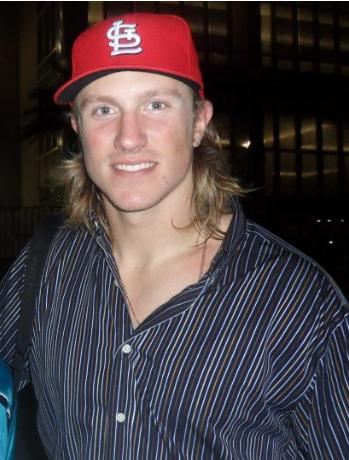
- Gabbert in 2011

No. 11, 2, 7, 9
- Position: Quarterback

Personal information
- Born: October 15, 1989 (age 37); Ballwin, Missouri, U.S.
- Listed height: 6 ft 4 in (1.93 m)
- Listed weight: 235 lb (107 kg)

Career information
- High school: Parkway West (Ballwin)
- College: Missouri (2008–2010)
- NFL draft: 2011: 1st round, 10th overall pick

Career history
- Jacksonville Jaguars (2011–2013); San Francisco 49ers (2014–2016); Arizona Cardinals (2017); Tennessee Titans (2018); Tampa Bay Buccaneers (2019–2022); Kansas City Chiefs (2023)

Awards and highlights
- 2× Super Bowl champion (LV, LVIII); Second-team All-Big 12 (2009)

Career NFL statistics
- Passing attempts: 1,568
- Passing completions: 882
- Completion percentage: 56.3%
- TD–INT: 51–50
- Passing yards: 9,487
- Passer rating: 71.7
- Stats at Pro Football Reference

Blaine Williamson Gabbert (born October 15, 1989) is an American former professional football quarterback who played in the National Football League (NFL) for 13 seasons. He played college football for the Missouri Tigers, earning second-team All-Big 12 honors in 2010. Gabbert was selected 10th overall by the Jacksonville Jaguars in the 2011 NFL draft and began his career as their starter, but his tenure lasted only three seasons due to inconsistent play and injuries. Gabbert alternated as the starter and backup for the San Francisco 49ers during his next three seasons and spent the rest of his career as backup with the Arizona Cardinals, Tennessee Titans, Tampa Bay Buccaneers, and Kansas City Chiefs. Gabbert was a member of the Buccaneers team that won Super Bowl LV and the Chiefs team that won Super Bowl LVIII.

== Early life ==
Gabbert was born in Ballwin, Missouri, a suburb of St. Louis. He attended Parkway West High School in Ballwin, where he played for the Parkway West Longhorns high school football team. He was a five-star blue-chip All-American and, according to Rivals.com, was their No. 14 national player overall at any position. He was invited to participate in the Elite 11 quarterback camp in the summer of 2007 where he won the camp MVP honors over Andrew Luck and then, in January 2008, he played in the US Army All-American Game. He recorded 623 passing yards and five touchdowns as a senior, despite an injured foot that limited him to four games. As a junior, he posted 1,523 yards and 20 touchdowns (on 119-of-231 passing) and also added another 458 yards rushing and eight touchdowns. In his sophomore season, Gabbert threw for approximately 1,100 yards and 11 touchdowns as a first-year starter.

== College career ==
Coming out of high school in 2008, Gabbert was considered a major college recruitment prospect. Rated as a five-star recruit by Rivals.com, he was listed as the highest ranked pro-style quarterback in the nation. Gabbert initially gave a verbal commitment to Nebraska, but rethought his decision after head coach Bill Callahan was fired. He eventually committed to the University of Missouri. Missouri coach Gary Pinkel decided not to redshirt Gabbert his freshman year, but instead play him as the third-string quarterback behind Chase Daniel and Chase Patton. Gabbert saw action in five games in reserve duty, leading the Tiger offense to a touchdown against Colorado and a field goal against Nevada. He completed 5-of-13 passing attempts for 43 yards and rushed six times for 22 yards.

Gabbert had a strong debut in 2009, throwing for 313 yards with three touchdowns in the air and another on the ground against the Illinois Fighting Illini in the annual Arch Rivalry. He set career highs with 30 completions (30 for 51) and 468 yards against Baylor. The 468 yards were the second-best single-game mark in school history, second only to Jeff Handy's 480 yards against Oklahoma State in 1992. Gabbert was named to second–Team All-Big 12 honors by multiple league media outlets, and he was also granted honorable mention for all-league honors from the AP after ranking 2nd in the Big 12 (29th in the NCAA) in passing efficiency (140.45 rating). Gabbert ranked 4th in the Big 12 and 11th in the NCAA in total offense (292.08 avg.). He led the Big 12 with 8.1 passing yards per attempt. Gabbert achieved the third-highest single-season passing total in school history, completing 262-of-445 passes for 3,593 yards, 24 touchdowns, and nine interceptions. He was also recognized for his success in the classroom and named to the 1st-Team Academic All-Big 12.

In 2010, Gabbert led Missouri to a season-opening 23–13 victory over Illinois. He threw for 34 passes on 48 attempts, with 281 yards and two touchdowns. Gabbert also went on to beat Colorado (17/29, 191, two touchdowns) despite being sidelined with an injury in the fourth quarter. Other highlights of the season include beating Texas A&M on the road (31/47, 361, three touchdowns), and upsetting #1 Oklahoma (30/42, 308, one touchdown). That victory ended a seven-game losing streak against the Sooners, going back to 1998. Overall, in his last season with the Tigers, Gabbert had 3,186 passing yards, 16 touchdowns, and nine interceptions to go along with 232 rushing yards and five touchdowns.

== Professional career ==
Pre-draft measurables
Height	Weight	Arm length	Hand span	Wingspan	40-yard dash	10-yard split	20-yard split	20-yard shuttle	Three-cone drill	Vertical jump	Broad jump	Wonderlic
6 ft 4 3/8 in (1.94 m)	234 lb (106 kg)	33 in (0.84 m)	10 in (0.25 m)	6 ft 6 3/4 in (2.00 m)	4.66 s	1.62 s	2.71 s	4.26 s	6.84 s	33.5 in (0.85 m)	10 ft 0 in (3.05 m)	42
All values from 2011 NFL Scouting Combine

=== Jacksonville Jaguars ===
==== 2011 season ====
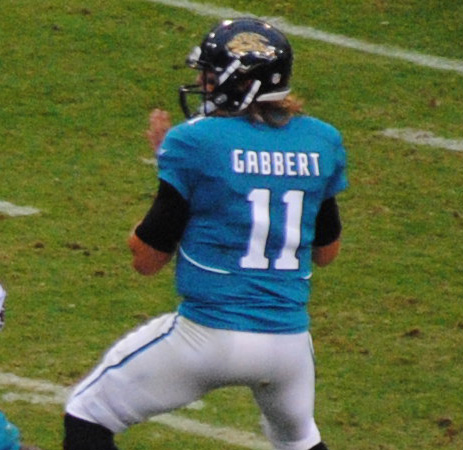
Gabbert in 2011

In January 2011, Gabbert announced that he would forgo his senior year to enter the 2011 NFL draft.

Gabbert was selected by the Jacksonville Jaguars in the first round of the 2011 NFL draft with the 10th overall pick. Jacksonville traded up six spots with the Washington Redskins to select Gabbert. He was the third quarterback to be selected that year, behind Cam Newton and Jake Locker. Gabbert is the only quarterback chosen in the first round of that draft class to win a Super Bowl, although he was a backup player at the time.

On July 28, 2011, Gabbert officially signed his contract worth $12 million over four years.

Though not slated to serve as starting quarterback, Gabbert quickly earned playing time under head coach Jack Del Rio after David Garrard was released in the preseason and Luke McCown performed poorly in the first two games. Gabbert played in his first NFL regular season game against the New York Jets in Week 2. He was then named starter against the Carolina Panthers the following week. In Week 5, against the Cincinnati Bengals, Gabbert threw a 74-yard touchdown pass to Jason Hill. At age 22, Gabbert became the youngest player in league history to start 14 games in a season. He played most of the season with a toe injury on his plant foot.

Gabbert struggled as a rookie. He was sacked 40 times, the third most by any quarterback in the league and also fumbled 14 times, most in the league by a quarterback. Gabbert's 50.8% completion percentage was second-worst in the league for passers with more than 200 attempts (ahead of only Tim Tebow's 46.5%). His 5.4 yards per attempt was last in the league among qualifying passers, as was his 65.4 passer rating. Football Outsiders calculated that Gabbert's 2011 season was "the fifth worst season we've ever measured" in aggregate value. Pete Prisco of CBSSports.com predicted that Gabbert's potential remained high, and that many of his struggles could be attributed to injuries and the unfavorable circumstances around him, including a rush-centered offense, a lack of talented quarterbacks ahead of him, and a weak receiving corps.

==== 2012 season ====
Going into 2012, Gabbert had a new head coach in Mike Mularkey. Gabbert threw for a then career-high 260 yards in the season opener against the Minnesota Vikings, along with two touchdowns and a career-high 96.1 quarterback rating. Despite his strong performance, the Jaguars lost 26–23 in overtime. In Week 3, a 22–17 victory over the Indianapolis Colts, Gabbert threw a career-high 80-yard touchdown pass to Cecil Shorts. Gabbert struggled in the following weeks, including a loss to the Chicago Bears, in which he threw two interceptions and fumbled once. Both interceptions were returned for touchdowns and the Jaguars lost 41–3. Against the Oakland Raiders, Gabbert tore the labrum in his non-throwing shoulder during the second quarter, and he was replaced by Chad Henne. Before being knocked out of the game, Gabbert completed eight of 12 passes for 110 yards, including a 42-yard touchdown pass. The following week, while playing against the Green Bay Packers, Gabbert passed for over 300 yards for the first time in his career, and completed 27–of–49 attempts for 303 yards in the 24–15 loss.

Gabbert was placed on injured reserve on November 21, 2012, officially ending his season. He was listed as having suffered a right forearm injury. The team cited in an official press release that Gabbert had also been playing with a torn labrum in his left shoulder that would require surgery.

==== 2013 season ====
Gabbert returned for the 2013 season under new head coach Gus Bradley, but played only three games, finishing with just one touchdown and seven interceptions. He started the season nursing a broken thumb that occurred during a pre-season game. During the season opener, Gabbert suffered a lacerated right hand, which required 15 stitches and prevented him from playing the following week against the Raiders. On October 6, in the third quarter against the St. Louis Rams, Gabbert injured his hamstring, forcing him out of the game.

=== San Francisco 49ers ===
==== 2014 season ====
On March 11, 2014, Gabbert was traded to the San Francisco 49ers for a sixth-round draft pick. Coach Jim Harbaugh made the following remarks about Gabbert joining the team: "I think he's a very talented player and his career so far hasn't gone on to be what he expected, and maybe others expected it to be. But I believe it can be a really powerful opportunity, powerful motivator for a player to say, 'It wasn't me, it was my situation.' And now he has that opportunity".

Gabbert made his 49ers debut during a Week 7 42–17 loss to the Denver Broncos, completing three of seven passes for 38 yards and a touchdown in his only appearance in the 2014 season.

==== 2015 season ====
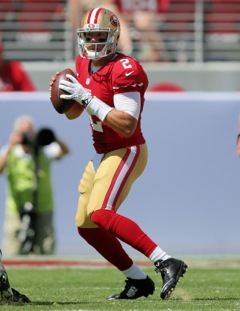
Gabbert in 2015

On March 10, 2015, the 49ers re-signed Gabbert to a two-year, $2 million deal. Going into the 2015 season, he had a new head coach in Jim Tomsula.

On November 2, 2015, Gabbert was named starter for the 49ers after Colin Kaepernick was benched. During Week 9, Gabbert made his first start since October 2013, leading the 49ers to a narrow 17–16 victory over the Atlanta Falcons. He completed 15 of 25 passes for 185 yards, two touchdowns, and two interceptions. The following day, the 49ers announced that Gabbert would remain the starter when the team played the Seattle Seahawks two weeks later. The 49ers lost 29–13, with Gabbert completing 22 of 34 passes for 264 yards and a touchdown with a 98.2 passer rating. During Week 13 against the Bears, Gabbert rushed for a 44-yard touchdown, the first rushing touchdown of his career. He then threw a 71-yard game-winning touchdown to Torrey Smith in overtime to give the 49ers a 26–20 victory.

Gabbert finished the 2015 season with 2,031 passing yards, 10 touchdowns, and seven interceptions for an 86.2 passer rating. In eight games as a starter, he had a 3–5 record.

==== 2016 season ====
On September 3, 2016, Gabbert was named the starting quarterback for the season opener. After starting the first five games of the season, he went 1–4 which led to new head coach Chip Kelly to start Colin Kaepernick. Later in the season, Gabbert temporarily replaced Kaepernick. After a poor performance in Week 12, he was benched again. He was replaced by Christian Ponder.

Gabbert finished the 2016 season, he finished with 925 passing yards, five touchdowns, and six interceptions to go along with 173 rushing yards and two touchdowns.

=== Arizona Cardinals ===
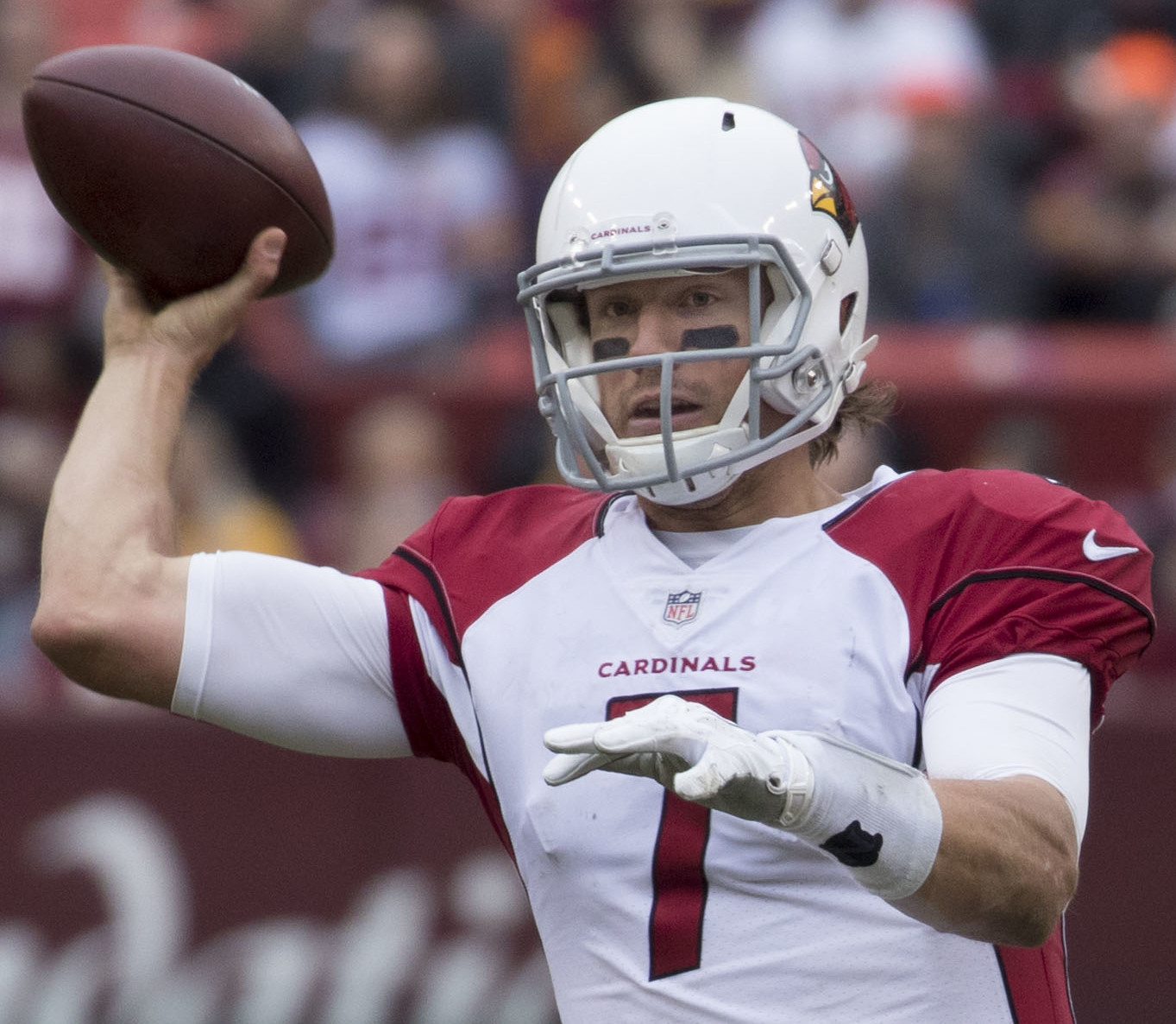
Gabbert in 2017

On May 10, 2017, Gabbert signed a one-year contract with the Arizona Cardinals. He started the season as the third-string quarterback behind Carson Palmer and Drew Stanton under head coach Bruce Arians.

Gabbert was named the Week 11 starter after Palmer and Stanton suffered injuries. During the game, Gabbert threw for 257 yards and a career-high three touchdowns as the Cardinals lost to the Houston Texans by a score of 31–21. Gabbert was benched on December 18, 2017, as the Cardinals' starting quarterback in favor of Stanton after not throwing for a touchdown in back-to-back games. In five games in the 2017 season, Gabbert finished with 1,086 passing yards, six touchdowns, and six interceptions.

=== Tennessee Titans ===
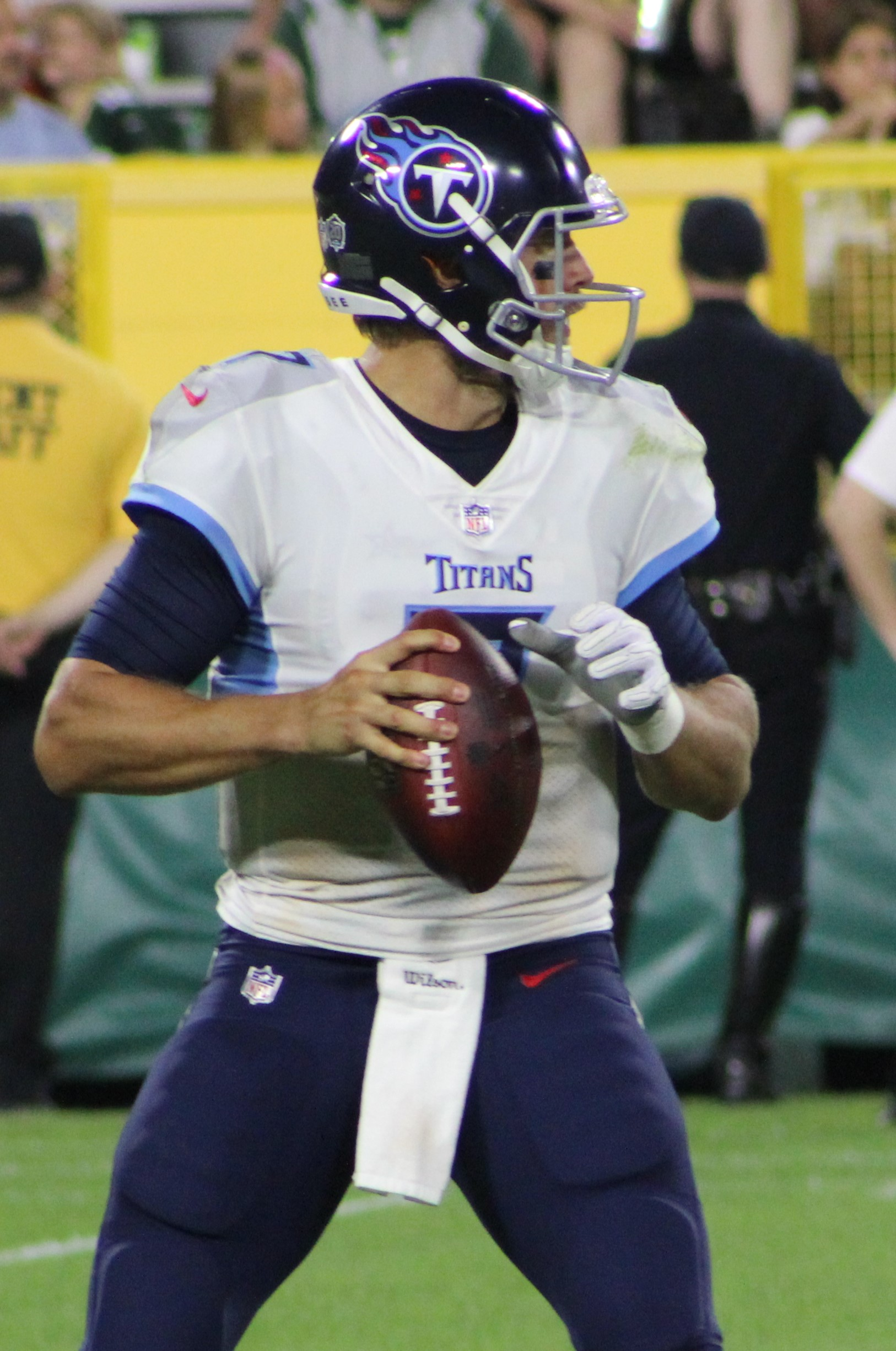
Gabbert in 2018

On March 27, 2018, Gabbert signed a two-year contract with the Tennessee Titans.

During the season-opening 27–20 road loss to the Miami Dolphins, Gabbert entered the game after starter Marcus Mariota suffered an elbow injury. Due to Mariota's injury, Gabbert started the next game against the Texans, defeating them 20–17. Gabbert also started the following week against his former team, the Jaguars. During that game, he struggled and was limited to eight passing yards before leaving the 9–6 road victory with a concussion.

Due to another injury to Mariota, Gabbert started the final game of the season with a Wild Card playoff spot on the line. In the game against the Colts, Gabbert threw for 165 yards, a touchdown, and two interceptions. The Titans lost 33–17 and missed the playoffs.

Gabbert was released by the Titans on March 15, 2019.

=== Tampa Bay Buccaneers ===
On March 27, 2019, Gabbert signed with the Tampa Bay Buccaneers, reuniting him with head coach Arians. On September 24, Gabbert was placed on injured reserve with a dislocated shoulder.

Gabbert re-signed with the Buccaneers on a one-year contract on April 2, 2020. On February 7, 2021, Gabbert served as backup quarterback behind Tom Brady in Super Bowl LV, where they would go on to defeat the Kansas City Chiefs 31–9, giving Gabbert his first Super Bowl victory.

The Buccaneers re-signed Gabbert on May 10, 2021. The following April, the Buccaneers once again re-signed him.

Gabbert remained Brady's backup in 2022 and made his only appearance of the season in Week 18 against the Falcons. Gabbert completed six passes for 29 yards and a touchdown to Russell Gage.

=== Kansas City Chiefs ===
Gabbert signed with the Chiefs on April 19, 2023. He started the regular season finale against the Los Angeles Chargers after the Chiefs elected to rest Patrick Mahomes. In his first start since 2018, Gabbert completed 15 of 30 passes for 154 yards and an interception to go along with 46 rushing yards during the narrow 13–12 victory. He won his second Super Bowl when the Chiefs defeated his former team, the San Francisco 49ers, 25–22 in overtime during Super Bowl LVIII. His contract expired on March 13, 2024, and he became an unrestricted free agent.

== Career statistics ==
=== NFL ===
Legend
	Won the Super Bowl
**Bold**	Career high

Year	Team	Games			Passing									Rushing					Sacks		Fumbles	
Year	Team	GP	GS	Record	Cmp	Att	Pct	Yds	Y/A	Lng	TD	Int	Rtg	Att	Yds	Avg	Lng	TD	Sck	SckY	Fum	Lost
2011	JAX	**15**	**14**	4–10	**210**	**413**	50.8	**2,214**	5.4	74	**12**	**11**	65.4	**48**	98	2.0	12	0	**40**	**293**	**14**	**5**
2012	JAX	10	10	1–9	162	278	58.3	1,662	6.0	**80**	9	6	77.4	18	56	3.1	10	0	22	158	5	3
2013	JAX	3	3	0–3	42	86	48.8	481	5.6	67	1	7	36.0	9	32	3.6	7	0	12	67	2	0
2014	SF	1	0	—	3	7	42.9	38	5.4	20	1	0	100.0	1	5	5.0	5	0	0	0	0	0
2015	SF	8	8	3–5	178	282	63.1	2,031	7.2	71	10	7	86.2	32	**185**	5.8	**44**	1	25	164	4	1
2016	SF	6	5	1–4	91	160	59.6	925	5.8	75	5	6	68.4	40	173	4.3	24	**2**	11	48	0	0
2017	ARI	5	5	2–3	95	171	55.6	1,086	6.4	52	6	6	71.9	22	82	3.7	12	0	23	149	7	2
2018	TEN	8	3	2–1	61	101	60.4	626	6.2	35	4	4	74.9	6	0	0.0	1	0	5	37	0	0
2019	TB	0	0	—	Did not play due to injury																	
2020	TB	4	0	—	9	16	56.2	143	**8.9**	35	2	0	**125.8**	6	16	2.7	16	0	1	9	1	0
2021	TB	6	0	—	7	11	63.6	67	6.1	23	0	0	80.5	9	−7	−0.8	0	0	1	10	0	0
2022	TB	1	0	—	6	8	**75.0**	29	3.6	13	1	0	119.3	0	0	0.0	0	0	0	0	0	0
2023	KC	2	1	**1–0**	18	35	51.4	185	5.3	37	0	3	31.3	7	45	**6.4**	25	0	1	9	0	0
Career		69	49	14–35	882	1,568	56.3	9,487	6.1	80	51	50	71.7	201	685	3.4	44	3	141	942	33	11

=== College ===
Season	Team	Cmp	Att	Pct	Yds	TD	Int	Rtg
2008	Missouri	5	13	38.4	43	0	0	66.2
2009	Missouri	262	445	58.8	3,593	24	9	140.5
2010	Missouri	301	475	63.4	3,186	16	9	127.0
Total		568	933	60.9	6,822	40	18	132.6

== Personal life ==
Gabbert enjoys deep-sea and fly fishing in his free time. He has two brothers. Tyler Gabbert, committed to Nebraska, like Blaine, only to decommit and commit to Missouri. He never played for the Tigers and transferred to UCF. His youngest brother is Brett Gabbert, a quarterback who played for the Miami University RedHawks.

On December 29, 2022, while riding jet skis, the Gabbert brothers helped save four individuals in the water near Davis Islands and Peter O. Knight Airport after an emergency landing of a helicopter. Blaine says he saw what "looked like a crew boat in the water that had broken up in about four pieces and I vaguely remember seeing like two yellow life jackets." The three brothers checked it out and called 911. They helped three people out of the water and onto their jet skis. Arriving Tampa Bay police officers helped the fourth person out of the water. Buccaneers Coach Todd Bowles described the rescue as "outstanding".
