= 2001 Notre Dame Fighting Irish football team =

American college football season

2001 Notre Dame Fighting Irish football
- Conference: Independent
- Record: 5–6
- Head coach: Bob Davie (5th season)
- Offensive coordinator: Kevin Rogers (3rd season)
- Offensive scheme: Option
- Defensive coordinator: Greg Mattison (5th season)
- Base defense: 4–3
- Home stadium: Notre Dame Stadium (c. 80,795, grass)

2001 NCAA Division I-A independents football records
	Conf.			Overall
Team	W		L	W		L
South Florida		–		8	–	3
Troy State		–		7	–	4
UCF		–		6	–	5
Notre Dame		–		5	–	6
Utah State		–		4	–	7
Connecticut		–		2	–	9
Navy		–		0	–	10
Rankings from AP Poll

The 2001 Notre Dame Fighting Irish football team was an American football team that represented the University of Notre Dame as an independent during the 2001 NCAA Division I-A football season. In their fifth and final year under head coach Bob Davie, the Irish compiled a 5–6 record and were outscored by a total of 215 to 214. In three games against ranked opponents, they lost to No. 5 Nebraska, No. 7 Tennessee, and No. 13 Stanford. Davie was fired as head coach one day after the final game of the season.

The team's statistical leaders included quarterback Carlyle Holiday (784 passing yards), running back Julius Jones (718 rushing yards), wide receiver Javin Hunter (37 receptions for 387 yards), and kicker Nicholas Setta (68 points scored, 23 of 23 PAT, 15 of 17 field goals).

The team played its home games at Notre Dame Stadium in Notre Dame, Indiana.

== Season overview ==
With 19 recruits signed to help replace the nine players leaving for the NFL, there were high expectations for the Irish for the 2001 season. Three players were named to pre-season All-America teams while the team was ranked as highly as 12th in the nation. With former starting quarterback, Arnaz Battle, moving in the off-season to wide receiver, Davie faced the decision of having to play his replacement from 2000, Matt LoVecchio, or to replace LoVecchio with fellow sophomore Carlyle Holiday. Prior to their first game, Davie hinted that he might have a surprise at quarterback, however, LoVecchio started at the fourth-ranked Nebraska Cornhuskers. Notre Dame's first play from scrimmage proved to be a harbinger when the Irish fumbled and Nebraska recovered. With LoVecchio ineffective throughout the first quarter, Holiday took over and led the Irish to a field goal. Holiday, however, was ineffective throughout the rest of the game and the only other Irish score came after Shane Walton blocked a punt and gave the Irish the ball on the 4 yard line. Unable to capitalize on Nebraska's mistakes, and having four turnovers themselves, the Irish lost the game 27–10. With a small quarterback controversy, the season was interrupted by the September 11, 2001 attacks. With all Division I-A football games canceled after the attacks, the September 15 game against Purdue was moved to the end of the season. With promises of heightened security, prayers, and a stadium-wide fundraiser to help the victims of the attacks, the Irish returned to the field the next week to face the Michigan State Spartans. With LoVecchio getting the start, he had a better game than his first, but the Irish fell short of the Spartans for the fifth straight year.

After the loss, Davie named Holiday the starting quarterback for the Texas A&M game. Though LoVecchio would play in later games, he would never start again for the Irish and eventually transferred from the school. Playing in front of, at the time, the largest crowd ever to watch a football game in Texas, Holiday was knocked out of the game with a neck injury before halftime. The Irish were unable move the ball and lost 24–3, moving to 0–3 for the first time ever. With Holiday back the next week, he led the Irish to their first victory of the season against the Pittsburgh Panthers, and continued to roll with wins over West Virginia and USC to put the Irish back to a 3–3 record. With a loss the next week to Boston College, however, the Irish hopes for a bowl game were dwindling and all but gone with a loss the next week to the seventh-ranked Tennessee Volunteers.

With a 3–5 record, the Irish would need to win all of their remaining games to avoid Davie's second losing season for the team. The Irish looked to turn it around with a dominating win over Navy that increased their record winning streak over them to 38 games, however, fell to Stanford the next week after both Holiday and LoVecchio completed only one pass each the entire game. Assured of Notre Dame's eighth losing season ever, the Irish traveled to face the Purdue Boilermakers for the game missed after the September 11 attacks. Though the Irish defense helped secure the win and the 5–6 record, it wasn't enough for the Notre Dame administration who fired Davie the next day.

== Schedule ==
Date	Time	Opponent	Rank	Site	TV	Result	Attendance
September 8	8:00 p.m.	at No. 4 Nebraska	No. 18	Memorial Stadium; Lincoln, NE (rivalry)	ABC	L 10–27	78,118
September 22	2:30 p.m.	Michigan State	No. 23	Notre Dame Stadium; Notre Dame, IN (rivalry)	NBC	L 10–17	80,795
September 29	3:30 p.m.	at Texas A&M		Kyle Field; College Station, TX	ABC	L 3–24	87,206
October 6	2:30 p.m.	Pittsburgh		Notre Dame Stadium; Notre Dame, IN (rivalry)	NBC	W 24–7	80,795
October 13	2:30 p.m.	West Virginia		Notre Dame Stadium; Notre Dame, IN	NBC	W 34–24	80,795
October 20	2:30 p.m.	USC		Notre Dame Stadium; Notre Dame, IN (rivalry)	NBC	W 27–16	80,795
October 27	7:30 p.m.	at Boston College		Alumni Stadium; Chestnut Hill, MA (Holy War)	ESPN	L 17–21	44,500
November 3	2:30 p.m.	No. 7 Tennessee		Notre Dame Stadium; Notre Dame, IN	NBC	L 18–28	80,795
November 17	1:00 p.m.	Navy		Notre Dame Stadium; Notre Dame, IN (rivalry)	NBC	W 34–16	80,795
November 24	8:00 p.m.	at No. 13 Stanford		Stanford Stadium; Stanford, CA (rivalry)	ABC	L 13–17	51,780
December 1	3:30 p.m.	at Purdue		Ross–Ade Stadium; West Lafayette, IN (rivalry)	ABC	W 24–15	68,750
Rankings from AP Poll released prior to the game; All times are in Eastern time

== Roster ==
2001 Notre Dame Fighting Irish football team roster
Players
Coaches
Offense

Pos.	#	Name	Class
QB	1	Jared Clark	So
QB	2	Dan Novakov	Jr
WR	3	Arnaz Battle	Sr
WR	6	David Givens	Sr
QB	7	Carlyle Holiday	So
WR	8	Lorenzo Crawford	So
QB	8	Matt Krueger	So
QB	9	Pat Dillingham	Fr
QB	10	Ryan Krueger	Sr
QB	10	Matt LoVecchio	So
RB	11	Marcus Wilson	Fr
RB	12	Tony Fisher	Sr
TE	14	Gary Godsey	Jr
WR	18	Ronnie Rodamer	So
WR	21	Javin Hunter	Sr
RB	22	Julius Jones	Jr
RB	23	Chris Yura	Jr
RB	24	Cory Jones	Fr
RB	25	Ryan Grant	Fr
RB	27	Mike Profeta	Fr
RB	28	Cole Laux	So
RB	32	Terrance Howard	Sr
RB	35	Tim O'Neill	Sr
FB	36	Tom Lopienski	Sr
RB	37	Albert Gembara	So
FB	38	Eric Nelson	Sr
FB	40	Jason Murray	Sr
FB	47	Mike McNair	Sr
WR	48	Jonathan Gentine	Jr
C	52	Jeff Faine	Jr
C	55	Zachary Giles	Fr
G	62	Casey Robin	Sr
OT	63	Brennan Curtin	Jr
G	64	Casey Dunn	Fr
G	65	Sean Milligan	Jr
C	66	JW Jordan	Sr
G	67	Ryan Gillis	Jr
G	69	Darin Mitchell	Fr
OT	70	Jim Molinaro	Jr
OL	71	David Kowalski	So
G	72	Ryan Scarola	Sr
OT	73	Mark LeVoir	Fr
OT	74	Dan Stevenson	Fr
OT	75	Kurt Vollers	Sr
OT	76	John Teasdale	Sr
OT	78	Jordan Black	Sr
G	79	Sean Mahan	Sr
WR	80	Omar Jenkins	So
WR	82	Bernard Akatu	Sr
WR	82	Matt Shelton	Fr
TE	83	Matt Root	Fr
TE	84	John Owens	Sr
TE	85	Billy Palmer	So
TE	86	Brendan Hart	So
TE	87	Patrick Nally	Fr
WR	87	Jonathan Smith	So
WR	88	Carlos Campbell	Fr
OL	97	Chris Mahoney	Jr

Defense

Pos.	#	Name	Class
LB	2	Carlos Pierre-Antoine	Sr
FS	4	Justin Smith	Sr
SS	5	Ron Israel	Sr
CB	9	Jason Beckstrom	Jr
DB	14	Mike Klockner	Jr
CB	15	Clifford Jefferson	Sr
SS	16	Abram Elam	So
FS	19	Glenn Earl	Jr
SS	20	Gerome Sapp	Jr
LB	24	Chad DeBolt	Sr
CB	26	Garron Bible	So
SS	26	Billy Small	So
CB	27	Lionel Bolen	Fr
FS	28	Donald Dykes	Sr
CB	29	Quentin Burrell	Fr
OLB	30	Rocky Boiman	Sr
FS	31	Dwayne Francis	Sr
LB	33	Courtney Watson	Jr
CB	34	Vontez Duff	So
CB	37	Dwight Ellick	Fr
CB	38	Preston Jackson	So
SS	39	David Bemenderfer	So
LB	39	Brandon Hoyte	Fr
LB	41	Mike Goolsby	So
CB	42	Shane Walton	Sr
OLB	43	Rashon Powers-Neal	Fr
DE	44	Grant Irons	Sr
SS	45	Matt Sarb	Sr
LB	46	Corey Mays	Fr
OLB	48	Justin Tuck	Fr
LB	49	Derek Curry	So
NG	50	Cedric Hilliard	Jr
LB	51	Tyreo Harrison	Sr
OLB	52	Mark Mitchell	Sr
DL	53	Jason Halvorson	Jr
LB	56	Pat Ryan	Jr
OLB	57	Justin Thomas	Jr
LB	59	Brian Dierckman	Sr
DT	60	Darrell Campbell	Jr
LB	61	Jesse DeSplinter	So
DE	64	Jeffrey Campbell	Sr
LB	68	Ed O'Connell	So
DT	77	Greg Pauly	So
OLB	81	Jerome Collins	So
DL	90	Brian Beidatsch	Fr
DL	91	Jeff Thompson	Fr
DE	92	Kyle Budinscak	So
NG	94	Andy Wisne	Sr
DE	95	Ryan Roberts	Sr
DE	98	Anthony Weaver	Sr
DE	99	Jason Sapp	So

Special teams

Pos.	#	Name	Class
K	13	Nick Setta	Jr
P	17	Joey Hildbold	Jr
P	19	D. J. Fitzpatrick	Fr
K	31	Evan Driedger	So
K	35	David Miller	Sr
LS	56	John Crowther	Sr
K	80	Adam Tibble	Sr
P	83	Josh Gentine	Jr

Head coach

- Bob Davie

Coordinators/assistant coaches

- Greg Mattison – Defensive Coordinator/Defensive Line
- Kevin Rogers – Offensive Coordinator/Quarterbacks
- Joker Phillips – Wide Receivers
- Desmond Robinson – Running Backs
- Dave Borbely – Offensive Line (Guards & Centers)
- Steve Addazio – Offensive Line (Tackles & Tight Ends)/Special Teams
- Kirk Doll – Assistant Head Coach, Linebackers
- David Lockwood – Cornerbacks
- Bill Sheridan – Safeties/Special Teams
- Bill Reagan – Football Administrator
- Rex Hogan – Football Intern
- John DeFilippo – Graduate Assistant
- Dennis Moynihan – Graduate Assistant

Legend

- (C) Team captain
- (S) Suspended
- (I) Ineligible
- Injured
- Redshirt

Roster
Last update: 2001-12-18

== 2002 NFL draft ==
The following Notre Dame players were selected in the 2002 NFL draft.

Player	Position	Round	Pick	NFL club
Anthony Weaver	Defensive end	2	52	Baltimore Ravens
Rocky Boiman	Linebacker	4	133	Tennessee Titans
John Owens	Tight end	5	138	Detroit Lions
Tyreo Harrison	Linebacker	6	198	Philadelphia Eagles
Javin Hunter	Wide Receiver	6	206	Baltimore Ravens
David Givens	Wide Receiver	7	252	New England Patriots
