= 2002 Notre Dame Fighting Irish football team =

American college football season

2002 Notre Dame Fighting Irish football

Gator Bowl, L 6–28 vs. NC State
- Conference: Independent

Ranking
- Coaches: No. 17
- AP: No. 17
- Record: 10–3
- Head coach: Tyrone Willingham (1st season)
- Offensive coordinator: Bill Diedrick (1st season)
- Offensive scheme: West Coast
- Defensive coordinator: Kent Baer (1st season)
- Base defense: 4–3
- Home stadium: Notre Dame Stadium

2002 NCAA Division I-A independents football records
	Conf.			Overall
Team	W		L	W		L
South Florida		–		9	–	2
No. 17 Notre Dame		–		10	–	3
Connecticut		–		6	–	6
Utah State		–		4	–	7
Troy State		–		4	–	8
Navy		–		2	–	10
Rankings from AP Poll

The 2002 Notre Dame Fighting Irish football team was an American football team that represented the University of Notre Dame as an independent during the 2002 NCAA Division I-A football season. In their first year under head coach Tyrone Willingham, the Irish compiled a 10–3 record, outscored opponents by a total of 290 to 217, and were ranked No. 17 in the final AP and Coaches Polls. They won the first eight games of the season and were at that point ranked No. 4 in the AP poll. The winning streak led to claims to a "Return to Glory", with the phrase appearing on t-shirts that created a "Sea of Green" in the stands, and on the September 30 cover of Sports Illustrated. However, the Irish lost three of their last five games, including a 44–13 loss to USC and a 28–6 loss to NC State in the Gator Bowl.

The team's statistical leaders included quarterback Carlyle Holiday (1,788 passing yards), running back Ryan Grant (1,085 rushing yards), wide receiver Arnaz Battle (58 receptions for 786 yards), and kicker Nicholas Setta (74 points, 32 of 32 PAT, 14 of 25 field goals). Defensive back Shane Walton tallied seven interceptions (two returned for touchdowns) and seven pass breakups, and was a unanimous first-team pick on the 2002 All-America college football team. Center Jeff Faine and linebacker Courtney Watson also received first-team All-America honors from at least one selector.

The team played its home games at Notre Dame Stadium in Notre Dame, Indiana.

== Schedule ==
Date	Time	Opponent	Rank	Site	TV	Result	Attendance
August 31	8:00 p.m.	vs. No. 21 Maryland		Giants Stadium; East Rutherford, NJ (Kickoff Classic)	ABC	W 22–0	72,903
September 7	12:00 p.m.	Purdue	No. 23	Notre Dame Stadium; Notre Dame, IN (rivalry)	NBC	W 24–17	80,795
September 14	1:30 p.m.	No. 7 Michigan	No. 20	Notre Dame Stadium; Notre Dame, IN (rivalry)	NBC	W 25–23	80,795
September 21	3:30 p.m.	at Michigan State	No. 12	Spartan Stadium; East Lansing, MI (rivalry)	ABC	W 21–17	75,182
October 5	1:30 p.m.	Stanford	No. 9	Notre Dame Stadium; Notre Dame, IN (rivalry)	NBC	W 31–7	80,795
October 12	1:30 p.m.	Pittsburgh	No. 8	Notre Dame Stadium; Notre Dame, IN (rivalry)	NBC	W 14–6	80,795
October 19	10:00 p.m.	at No. 18 Air Force	No. 7	Falcon Stadium; Colorado Springs, CO (College GameDay) (rivalry)	ESPN	W 21–14	56,409
October 26	12:00 p.m.	at No. 11 Florida State	No. 6	Doak Campbell Stadium; Tallahassee, FL (rivalry)	ABC	W 34–24	84,106
November 2	2:30 p.m.	Boston College	No. 4	Notre Dame Stadium; Notre Dame, IN (Holy War)	NBC	L 7–14	80,935
November 9	12:00 p.m.	at Navy	No. 9	Ravens Stadium; Baltimore, MD (rivalry)	CBS	W 30–23	70,260
November 23	1:00 p.m.	Rutgers	No. 8	Notre Dame Stadium; Notre Dame, IN	NBC	W 42–0	80,795
November 30	8:00 p.m.	at No. 6 USC	No. 7	Los Angeles Memorial Coliseum; Los Angeles, CA (rivalry)	ABC	L 13–44	91,432
January 1, 2003	12:30 p.m.	vs. No. 17 NC State	No. 11	Alltel Stadium; Jacksonville, FL (Gator Bowl)	NBC	L 6–28	73,491
Rankings from AP Poll released prior to the game; All times are in Eastern time

== Roster ==
2002 Notre Dame Fighting Irish football team roster
Players
Coaches
Offense

Pos.	#	Name	Class
TE	1	Jared Clark	Jr
QB	2	Dan Novakov	Sr
FL	3	Arnaz Battle	Sr
RB	4	Ryan Grant	So
WR	5	Rhema McKnight	Fr
WR	6	Carlos Campbell	So
QB	7	Carlyle Holiday	Jr
QB	8	Matt Krueger	Jr
QB	9	Pat Dillingham	So
RB	11	Marcus Wilson	So
QB	12	Chris Olsen	Fr
TE	14	Gary Godsey	Sr
QB	16	Stan Revelle	So
SE	18	Ronnie Rodamer	Jr
WR	21	Maurice Stovall	Fr
FB	23	Chris Yura	Sr
RB	25	Nate Schiccatano	Fr
FB	26	Josh Schmidt	So
RB	27	Mike Profeta	So
FB	28	Cole Laux	Jr
RB	32	Jeff Jenkins	Fr
RB	35	Tim O'Neill	Sr
FB	36	Tom Lopienski	Sr
WR	40	Nate Schomas	Jr
RB	43	Rashon Powers-Neal	So
FB	47	Mike McNair	Sr
OL	51	Jamie Ryan	Fr
C	52	Jeff Faine	Sr
C	53	John Crowther	Sr
OL	54	David Fitzgerald	Fr
C	55	Zachary Giles	So
OL	59	James Bent	Fr
OL	62	Scott Raridon	Fr
OT	63	Brennan Curtin	Sr
OT	64	Casey Dunn	So
G	65	Sean Milligan	Sr
G	67	Ryan Gillis	Sr
G	69	Darin Mitchell	So
OT	70	Jim Molinaro	Sr
OL	71	James Bonelli	Fr
OL	71	David Kowalski	Jr
C	72	Ryan Scarola	Sr
OT	73	Mark LeVoir	So
G	74	Dan Stevenson	So
C	76	Bob Morton	Fr
OT	78	Jordan Black	Sr
G	79	Sean Mahan	Sr
FL	80	Omar Jenkins	Jr
SE	82	Bernard Akatu	Sr
WR	82	Matt Shelton	So
TE	83	Matt Root	So
WR	84	Mike O'Hara	Fr
TE	85	Billy Palmer	Jr
TE	86	Brendan Hart	Jr
TE	87	Marcus Freeman	Fr
TE	87	Patrick Nally	So
TE	88	Anthony Fasano	Fr

Defense

Pos.	#	Name	Class
MLB	2	Carlos Pierre-Antoine	Sr
CB	9	Jason Beckstrom	Sr
DB	15	Preston Jackson	Jr
FS	19	Glenn Earl	Sr
SS	20	Gerome Sapp	Sr
SS	24	Chad DeBolt	Sr
CB	26	Garron Bible	Jr
SS	27	Lionel Bolen	So
FS	29	Quentin Burrell	So
DB	30	Mike Richardson	Fr
DB	31	Jake Carney	Fr
MLB	33	Courtney Watson	Sr
CB	34	Vontez Duff	Jr
CB	37	Dwight Ellick	So
SS	39	David Bemenderfer	Jr
MLB	39	Brandon Hoyte	So
MLB	41	Mike Goolsby	Jr
CB	42	Shane Walton	Sr
DE	44	Justin Tuck	So
MLB	46	Corey Mays	So
OLB	48	Jerome Collins	Jr
OLB	49	Derek Curry	Jr
NG	50	Cedric Hilliard	Sr
DL	54	Jason Halvorson	Sr
MLB	56	Pat Ryan	Sr
OLB	57	Justin Thomas	Sr
DT	60	Darrell Campbell	Sr
LB	61	Charles Hedman	Sr
DL	66	Derek Landri	Fr
LB	68	Ed O'Connell	Sr
DL	75	Chris Frome	Fr
DT	77	Greg Pauly	Jr
DB	81	Anthony Salvador	Fr
DL	90	Brian Beidatsch	So
DL	91	Jeff Thompson	So
DT	92	Kyle Budinscak	Jr
DL	93	Dan Santucci	Fr
DL	94	Brian Mattes	Fr
DE	95	Ryan Roberts	Sr
DL	97	Travis Leitko	Fr
DE	99	Jason Sapp	Jr

Special teams

Pos.	#	Name	Class
K	13	Nicholas Setta	Sr
P	17	Joey Hildbold	Sr
K	19	D.J. Fitzpatrick	So
K	35	David Miller	Sr

Head coach

- Tyrone Willingham

Coordinators/assistant coaches

- Kent Baer – Defensive Coordinator
- Mike Denbrock – Offensive Line
- Bill Diedrick – Offensive Coordinator/Quarterbacks
- Greg Mattison – Defensive Line
- John McDonell – Offensive Line
- Trent Miles – Receivers
- Buzz Preston – Running Backs
- Bob Simmons – Linebackers
- Trent Walters – Secondary
- Phil Zacharias – Linebackers/Special Teams
- John DeFilippo – Graduate Assistant
- Erica Genise – Director of Football Operations
- Rex Hogan – Football Intern
- Dennis Moynihan – Graduate Assistant

Legend

- (C) Team captain
- (S) Suspended
- (I) Ineligible
- Injured
- Redshirt

Roster

== Rankings ==
Ranking movements Legend: ██ Increase in ranking ██ Decrease in ranking — = Not ranked ( ) = First-place votes
	Week																	
Poll	Pre	1	2	3	4	5	6	7	8	9	10	11	12	13	14	15	16	Final
AP	—	—	23	20	12	10	9	8	7	6	4 (1)	9	9	8	7	11	11	17
Coaches	—	—	24	21	12	10	9	8	7	6	6 (1)	10	9	8	7	13	12	17
BCS	Not released									3	3	7	7	6	7	10	9	Not released

== Game summaries ==
=== Michigan State ===
During the Michigan State game, quarterback Carlyle Holiday was injured and replaced by backup Pat Dillingham. Dillingham led the Irish to a comeback win on a screen pass to Arnaz Battle.

=== Florida State ===
Holiday returned for the Florida State game. In that game, Holiday threw a 65-yard touchdown on his first play to Battle that helped the Irish win the game.

=== Boston College ===
The first Irish loss of the season came against the Boston College Eagles, mirroring the 1993 season when Notre Dame narrowly lost a chance to participate in the national championship game due to a loss to Boston College. Willingham, wanting the team to be a part of the "Sea of Green" in the stands, decided that the team should wear green for the game. In 1985, the last time the Irish wore green at home, they came out after halftime against USC and won the game 37–3. The ploy, however, did not work this time, as the Irish committed 5 turnovers and Holiday was injured again and replaced by Dillingham, who threw 2 interception, one of which the Eagles returned for a touchdown that sealed the loss for the Irish.

=== Navy ===
The Fighting Irish won their 39th straight victory over Navy.

=== Rutgers ===
Notre Dame won a 42–0 blowout victory over struggling Rutgers.

=== at No. 6 USC ===
Team	1	2	3	4	Total
No. 7 Fighting Irish	6	7	0	0	13
• No. 6 Trojans	0	17	13	14	44

- Date: November 30
- Location: Los Angeles Memorial Coliseum, Los Angeles
- Game start: 8:00 p.m. EST
- Elapsed time: 3:26
- Game attendance: 91,432
- Game weather: Cloudy; 60 °F (16 °C); wind variable
- Referee: Chuck McFerrin
- Television network: ABC

Scoring summary
Q1	4:10	ND	Setta 34-yard field goal	ND 3–0
Q1	3:46	ND	Setta 32-yard field goal	ND 6–0
Q2	10:49	USC	Williams 6-yard pass from Palmer (Killeen kick)	USC 7–6
Q2	3:34	USC	Killeen 22-yard field goal	USC 10–6
Q2	1:07	ND	Pierre-Antoine recovered blocked punt in end zone (Setta kick)	ND 13–10
Q2	:05	USC	Williams 19-yard pass from Palmer (Killeen kick)	USC 17–13
Q3	12:01	USC	MacKenzie 15-yard pass from Palmer (Killeen kick)	USC 24–13
Q3	6:36	USC	Killeen 27-yard field goal	USC 27–13
Q3	2:15	USC	Killeen 29-yard field goal	USC 30–13
Q4	11:58	USC	McCullough 11-yard run (Killeen kick)	USC 37–13
Q4	7:23	USC	MacKenzie 10-yard pass from Palmer (Killeen kick)	USC 44–13

Notre Dame had a legitimate shot at a Bowl Championship Series (BCS) bowl game if they could win against perennial rival USC. The Irish were ranked higher than the Trojans, but USC quarterback Carson Palmer, who cited the game as the reason he went on to win the Heisman Trophy, threw for 425 yards in the Trojans' 31 point win.

=== Vs. NC State (Gator Bowl) ===
Gator Bowl

Team	1	2	3	4	Total
• Wolfpack	0	21	0	7	28
Fighting Irish	3	0	3	0	6

- Date: January 1, 2003
- Location: Alltel Stadium, Jacksonville, Florida
- Game start: 12:30 PM EST
- Elapsed time: 3:46
- Game attendance: 73,491
- TV announcers (NBC): Mike Breen (Play-by-play), Pat Hayden

Scoring summary
1	5:09	ND	Nick Setta 23-yard field goal	ND 3-0
2	14:30	NCST	T.A. McLendon 2-yard run (Adam Kiker kick)	NCST 7-3
2	5:30	NCST	T.A. McLendon 3-yard run (Adam Kiker kick)	NCST 14-3
2	1:37	NCST	Jerricho Cotchery 9-yard pass from Philip Rivers (Adam Kiker kick)	NCST 21-3
3	2:50	ND	Nick Setta 41-yard field goal	NCST 21-6
4	10:50	NCST	Sean Berton 7-yard pass from Philip Rivers (Adam Kiker kick)	NCST 28-6

The Irish won 10 games but were not invited to a BCS bowl game, and they accepted a bid to play North Carolina State in the Gator Bowl instead. With both an offense and defense that outmatched the Irish, the Wolfpack won the game 28–6, giving the Irish their sixth consecutive bowl loss. Despite the loss, the Irish ended the season ranked in both the Associated Press (AP) and Coaches Polls.

== Statistical leaders ==
Passing

1. Carlyle Holiday - 129 of 257 (50.2%) for 1,788 yards, 10 touchdowns and 5 interceptions, 117.58 efficiency
2. Pat Dillingham - 41 of 81 (50.6%) for 434 yards, 1 touchdown, 7 interceptions, 82.41 efficiency

Rushing

1. Ryan Grant - 1,085 yards on 261 attempts, 4.2 yards per carry, 9 touchdowns
2. Rashon Powers-Neal - 333 yards on 77 carries, 4.3 yards per carry, 2 touchdowns
3. Carlyle Holiday - 200 yards on 92 carries, 2.2 yards per carry, 3 touchdowns
4. Marcus Wilson - 110 yards on 39 carries, 2.8 yards per carry, 0 touchdowns

Receiving

1. Arnaz Battle - 58 receptions for 786 yards, 13.6 yards per reception, 5 touchdowns
2. Omar Jenkins - 37 receptions for 633 yards, 17.1 yards per reception, 3 touchdowns
3. Maurice Stovall - 18 receptions for 312 yards, 17.3 yards per reception, 3 touchdowns
4. Gary Godsey - 16 receptions for 155 yards, 9.7 yards per reception, 0 touchdowns
5. Jared Clark - 7 receptions for 104 yards, 14.9 yards per reception, 0 touchdowns

Tackles

1. Courtney Watson - 90 total, 51 solo
2. Glenn Earl - 81 total, 52 solo
3. Mike Goolsby - 75 total, 51 solo
4. Gerome Sapp - 71 total, 42 solo
5. Shane Walton - 68 total, 46 solo
6. Brandon Hoyt - 57 total, 42 solo

Punt returns

1. Vontez Duff - 40 returns for 385 yards, 9.6-yard average, 1 touchdown
2. Shane Walton - 9 returns for 85 yards, 9.4-yard average, 0 touchdowns

Kick returns

1. Vontez Duff - 19 returns for 526 yards, 27.7-yard average, 1 touchdown
2. Arnaz Battle - 16 returns for 335 yards, 20.9-yard average, 0 touchdowns

Interceptions

1. Shane Walton - 7 interceptions for 84 yards, 2 touchdowns
2. Courtney Watson - 4 interceptions for 123 yards, 1 touchdown
3. Gerome Sapp - 4 interceptions for 17 yards, 0 touchdowns

== Awards and honors ==
Head coach Tyrone Willingham received The Home Depot Coach of the Year Award and the George Munger Award. He was also named by Sporting News as "Sportsman of the Year", and was the only coach listed by Sporting News as one of their "Most Powerful People in Sports".

Cornerback Shane Watson was a unanimous first-team selection on the 2002 All-America college football team.

Offensive lineman Jeff Faine received first-team All-America honors from The Sporting News, Pro Football Weekly, and ESPN.

Linebacker Courtney Watson received first-team All-America honors from ESPN.

Wide receiver Arnaz Battle was named by the Independence Bowl Foundation as their sportsman of the year.

== 2003 NFL draft ==
The following Notre Dame players were selected in the 2003 NFL draft.

Player	Position	Round	Pick	NFL club
Jeff Faine	Center	1	21	Cleveland Browns
Jordan Black	Tackle	5	153	Kansas City Chiefs
Sean Mahan	Center	5	168	Tampa Bay Buccaneers
Shane Walton	Safety	5	170	St. Louis Rams
Gerome Sapp	Safety	6	182	Baltimore Ravens
Arnaz Battle	Wide Receiver	6	197	San Francisco 49ers
Brennan Curtin	Tackle	6	212	Green Bay Packers
