= 2003 Notre Dame Fighting Irish football team =

American college football season

2003 Notre Dame Fighting Irish football
- Conference: Independent
- Record: 5–7
- Head coach: Tyrone Willingham (2nd season)
- Offensive coordinator: Bill Diedrick (2nd season)
- Offensive scheme: West Coast
- Defensive coordinator: Kent Baer (2nd season)
- Base defense: 4–3
- Captains: Darrell Campbell; Vontez Duff; Omar Jenkins; Jim Molinaro
- Home stadium: Notre Dame Stadium

2003 NCAA Division I-A independents football records
	Conf.			Overall
Team	W		L	W		L
Connecticut		–		9	–	3
Navy		–		8	–	5
Troy State		–		6	–	6
Notre Dame		–		5	–	7
Rankings from AP Poll

The 2003 Notre Dame Fighting Irish football team was an American football team that represented the University of Notre Dame as an independent during the 2003 NCAA Division I-A football season. In their second year under head coach Tyrone Willingham, the Irish compiled a 5–7 record, and were outscored by a total of 314 to 243. The season was punctuated by a pair of three-game losing streaks that included blowout losses against Michigan (38–0), USC (45–14), and Florida State (37–0).

The team's statistical leaders included quarterback Brady Quinn (1,831 passing yards), running back Julius Jones (1,268 rushing yards, 60 points scored), and wide receiver Rhema McKnight (47 receptions for 600 yards).

The team played its home games at Notre Dame Stadium in Notre Dame, Indiana.

== Season overview ==
The 2003 season began with the Irish losing a number of key players to graduation, including Arnaz Battle and center Jeff Faine. They were boosted, however, by the return of running back, Julius Jones, who was reinstated to the team after a year of academic ineligibility. In Willingham's first full year of recruiting, he signed a top-5 class. Of the 20 recruits signed, 12 were four-star recruits (high school recruits are rated on a star scale, with one star indicating a low-quality recruit and five stars indicating the highest-quality recruit). These new recruits included future stars Victor Abiamiri, Chinedum Ndukwe, Brady Quinn, Jeff Samardzija, and Tom Zbikowski

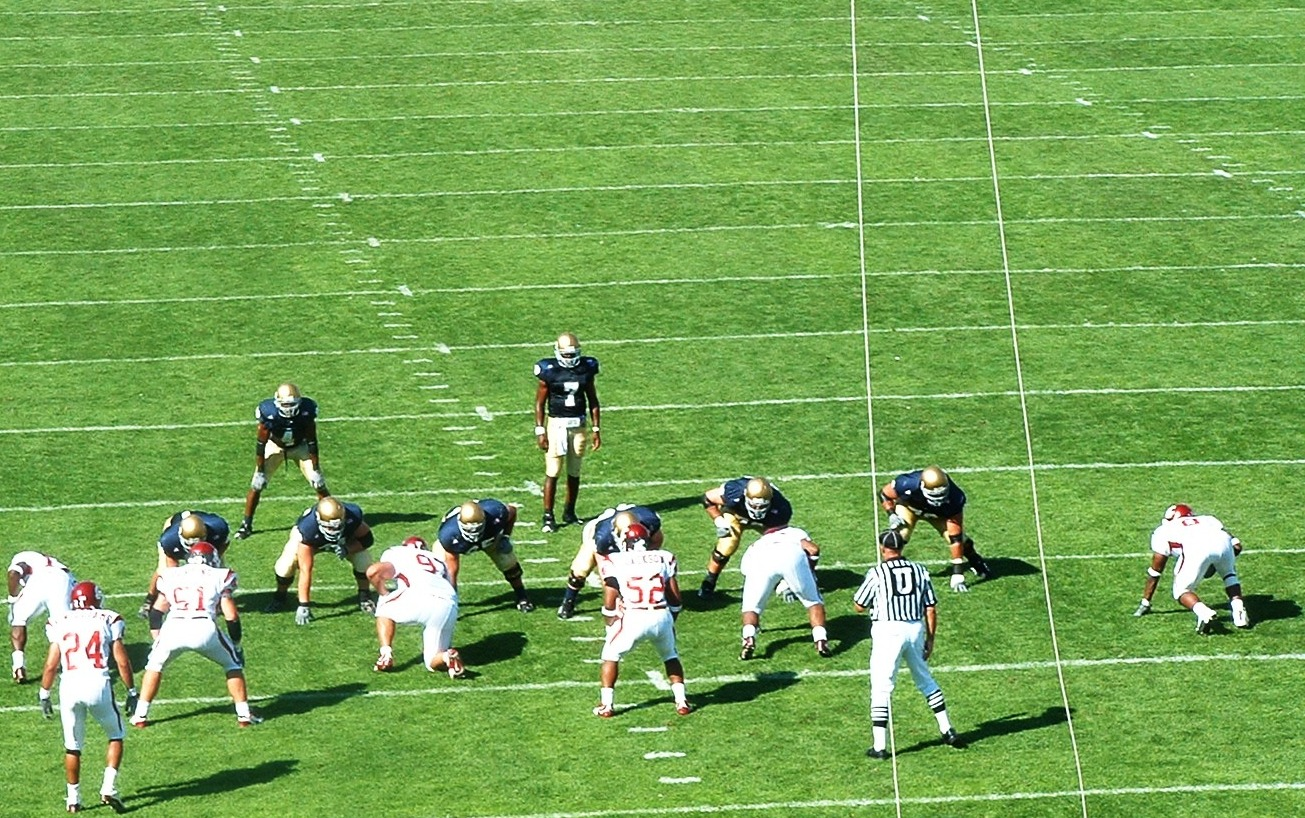
Carlyle Holiday and Ryan Grant in the back field versus Washington State

The Irish began their season ranked 19th and facing the hardest schedule in the nation. They opened against the Washington State Cougars, playing the team for the first time in the history of the program. The Irish came back from being down by 19 points to win in overtime, but Carlyle Holiday struggled as quarterback. In the next game against rival Michigan, the Wolverines avenged their 2002 loss by beating the Irish by a score of 38–0 in the first shutout in the series in 100 years and the largest margin of victory ever between the two teams. After another loss to Michigan State, many Irish fans were calling for Holiday to be taken out of the game in favor of freshman Brady Quinn, who saw his first collegiate action in the fourth quarter of the Michigan rout. Holiday was replaced as starter for the next game against Purdue.

In Quinn's first start, the Irish were bolstered with Quinn's 297 passing yards on 59 attempts. However, Purdue's defense intercepted four of Quinn's passes and sacked him five times en route to a 23–10 Boilermaker victory. Quinn remained as the starter and, with Willingham's acknowledgment that the running game needed to take more of a role in the next game, got his first win against Pittsburgh. He was helped by Julius Jones' school-record 262 rushing yards. Notre Dame lost their next three games, including Willingham's second straight 31 point loss to USC, a last minute loss to Boston College, and their first home shutout since 1978 to Florida State. The Irish players began to call the season disappointing, as the team needed to win their last four games to make a bowl game. They looked to have a chance of becoming bowl eligible, as their next three games were a last minute win that improved their streak to 40 games over Navy, a win on senior day over the Brigham Young University (BYU) Cougars, and a win over Stanford that saw the Irish offense finally connect in the season. Notre Dame lost their final game to Syracuse, however. With a 5–7 record, the Irish finished with the twelfth losing season in the history of the Notre Dame football program.

== Schedule ==
Date	Time	Opponent	Rank	Site	TV	Result	Attendance	Source
September 6	2:30 p.m.	Washington State	No. 19	Notre Dame Stadium; Notre Dame, IN	NBC	W 29–26 ^{OT}	80,795	
September 13	3:30 p.m.	at No. 5 Michigan	No. 15	Michigan Stadium; Ann Arbor, MI (rivalry)	ABC	L 0–38	111,726	
September 20	2:30 p.m.	Michigan State		Notre Dame Stadium; Notre Dame, IN (rivalry)	NBC	L 16–22	80,795	
September 27	2:30 p.m.	at No. 22 Purdue		Ross–Ade Stadium; West Lafayette, IN (rivalry)	ABC	L 10–23	64,614	
October 11	6:00 p.m.	at No. 15 Pittsburgh		Heinz Field; Pittsburgh, PA (rivalry)	ESPN	W 20–14	66,421	
October 18	2:30 p.m.	No. 5 USC		Notre Dame Stadium; Notre Dame, IN (rivalry)	NBC	L 14–45	80,795	
October 25	12:00 p.m.	at Boston College		Alumni Stadium; Chestnut Hill, MA (Holy War)	ABC	L 25–27	44,500	
November 1	2:30 p.m..	No. 5 Florida State		Notre Dame Stadium; Notre Dame, IN (rivalry)	NBC	L 0–37	80,795	
November 8	2:30 p.m.	Navy		Notre Dame Stadium; Notre Dame, IN (rivalry)	NBC	W 27–24	80,795	
November 15	2:30 p.m.	BYU		Notre Dame Stadium; Notre Dame, IN	NBC	W 33–14	80,795	
November 29	8:00 p.m.	at Stanford		Stanford Stadium; Stanford, CA	ABC	W 57–7	46,500	
December 6	1:00 p.m.	at Syracuse		Carrier Dome; Syracuse, NY	ABC	L 12–38	48,170	
Rankings from AP Poll released prior to the game; All times are in Eastern time

== Game summaries ==
=== Washington State ===
Team	1	2	3	4	OT	Total
Washington St	12	7	0	7	0	26
• Notre Dame	0	3	3	20	3	29

- Date: September 6
- Location: Notre Dame Stadium, South Bend, IN
- Game start: 2:30 p.m. EST
- Television network: NBC

Scoring summary
1	7:52	WSU	Sammy Moore 15-yard pass from Matt Kegel (kick failed)	Wash St 6–0
1	4:56	WSU	Drew Dunning 20-yard field goal	Wash St 9–0
1	:31	WSU	Drew Dunning 29-yard field goal	Wash St 12–0
2	2:37	WSU	Isaac Brown 12-yard fumble return (Drew Dunning kick)	Wash St 19–0
2	:10	ND	Nick Setta 37-yard field goal	Wash St 19–3
3	10:10	ND	Nick Setta 32-yard field goal	Wash St 19–6
4	12:09	ND	Nick Setta 39-yard field goal	Wash St 19–9
4	10:32	ND	Rhema McKnight 11-yard pass from Carlyle Holiday (Nick Setta kick)	Wash St 19–16
4	5:03	ND	Julius Jones 19-yard run (Nick Setta kick)	Notre Dame 23–19
4	3:03	ND	Nick Setta 47-yard field goal	Notre Dame 26–19
4	:53	WSU	Sammy Moore 34-yard pass from Matt Kegel (Drew Dunning kick)	Tie 26–26
OT		ND	Nick Setta 40-yard field goal	Notre Dame 29–26

== Roster ==
2003 Notre Dame Fighting Irish football team roster
Players
Coaches
Offense

Pos.	#	Name	Class
TE	1	Jared Clark	Sr
RB	4	Ryan Grant	Jr
WR	5	Rhema McKnight	So
QB	7	Carlyle Holiday	Sr
QB	8	Matt Krueger	Sr
QB	9	Pat Dillingham	Jr
QB	10	Brady Quinn	Fr
RB	11	Marcus Wilson	Jr
FB	12	Josh Schmidt	Jr
TE	14	Gary Godsey	Sr
FB	16	Rashon Powers-Neal	Jr
QB	16	Stan Revelle	Jr
WR	18	Ronnie Rodamer	Sr
RB	20	Travis Thomas	Fr
WR	21	Maurice Stovall	So
RB	22	Julius Jones	Sr
WR	23	Chase Anastasio	Fr
FB	25	Nate Schiccatano	So
RB	27	Mike Profeta	Sr
FB	28	Cole Laux	Sr
RB	32	Jeff Jenkins	So
FB	35	Ashley McConnell	Fr
WR	40	Nate Schomas	Sr
WR	42	Ambrose Wooden	Fr
OT	51	Jamie Ryan	So
OL	54	David Fitzgerald	So
C	55	Zachary Giles	Jr
OL	59	James Bent	So
OT	62	Scott Raridon	So
G	64	Casey Dunn	Jr
G	65	Sean Milligan	Sr
OL	68	Ryan Harris	Fr
G	69	Darin Mitchell	Jr
OT	70	Jim Molinaro	Sr
G	71	James Bonelli	So
G	71	David Kowalski	Sr
G	72	Jeff Thompson	Jr
OT	73	Mark LeVoir	Jr
OT	74	Dan Stevenson	Jr
C	76	Bob Morton	So
OL	78	John Sullivan	Fr
OT	79	Brian Mattes	So
WR	80	Omar Jenkins	Sr
WR	81	Chinedum Ndukwe	Fr
WR	82	Matt Shelton	Jr
WR	83	Jeff Samardzija	Fr
WR	84	Mike O'Hara	So
WR	84	Rob Woods	So
TE	85	Billy Palmer	Sr
TE	87	Marcus Freeman	So
TE	88	Anthony Fasano	So
TE	88	Patrick Nally	Sr
TE	89	John Carlson	Fr

Defense

Pos.	#	Name	Class
DB	2	Freddie Parish IV	Fr
CB	6	Carlos Campbell	Jr
FS	8	Quentin Burrell	Jr
CB	9	Jason Beckstrom	Sr
CB	15	Preston Jackson	Sr
FS	19	Glenn Earl	Sr
CB	24	Dwight Ellick	Jr
SS	26	Garron Bible	Sr
SS	27	Lionel Bolen	Jr
DB	28	Tom Zbikowski	Fr
DB	29	LaBrose Hedgemon II	Fr
CB	30	Mike Richardson	So
SS	31	Jake Carney	So
MLB	33	Courtney Watson	Sr
CB	34	Vontez Duff	Sr
DB	36	Isaiah Gardner	Fr
DB	37	Matt Mitchell	So
SS	39	David Bemenderfer	Sr
MLB	39	Brandon Hoyte	Jr
MLB	41	Mike Goolsby	Sr
LB	43	Anthony Salvador	So
DE	44	Justin Tuck	Jr
MLB	46	Corey Mays	Jr
LB	47	Mitchell Thomas	Fr
OLB	48	Jerome Collins	Sr
OLB	49	Derek Curry	Sr
NG	50	Cedric Hilliard	Sr
LB	52	Joe Brockington	Fr
LB	56	Nick Borseti	Fr
LB	57	Dwight Stephenson Jr.	Fr
DT	60	Darrell Campbell	Sr
NG	66	Derek Landri	So
DE	75	Chris Frome	So
NG	77	Greg Pauly	Sr
DE	90	Brian Beidatsch	Jr
DE	92	Kyle Budinscak	Sr
DE	93	Dan Santucci	So
DL	95	Victor Abiamiri	Fr
DL	96	Matt Hasbrook	Jr
DE	97	Travis Leitko	So
DL	98	Trevor Laws	Fr
DE	99	Jason Sapp	Sr

Special teams

Pos.	#	Name	Class
K	13	Nicholas Setta	Sr
P	17	Geoffrey Price	Fr
K	19	D.J. Fitzpatrick	Jr
K	45	Carl Gioia	Fr
LS	58	Paul Jancha	So
K	91	Craig Cardillo	So
K	96	Bobby Renkes	Fr

Head coach

- Tyrone Willingham

Coordinators/assistant coaches

- Kent Baer – Defensive Coordinator
- Mike Denbrock – Offensive Line
- Bill Diedrick – Offensive Coordinator/Quarterbacks
- Greg Mattison – Defensive Line
- John McDonell – Offensive Line
- Trent Miles – Receivers
- Buzz Preston – Running Backs
- Bob Simmons – Linebackers
- Trent Walters – Secondary
- D.J. Durkin – Graduate Assistant
- Chad Klunder – Graduate Assistant
- Erica Genise – Director of Football Operations
- Jimmy Gonzales – Director of Personnel Development

Legend

- (C) Team captain
- (S) Suspended
- (I) Ineligible
- Injured
- Redshirt

Roster
