= 2004 Notre Dame Fighting Irish football team =

American college football season

2004 Notre Dame Fighting Irish football

Insight Bowl, L 21–38 vs. Oregon State
- Conference: Independent
- Record: 6–6
- Head coach: Tyrone Willingham (3rd season; regular season); Kent Baer (interim; bowl game)
- Offensive coordinator: Bill Diedrick (3rd season)
- Offensive scheme: West Coast
- Defensive coordinator: Kent Baer (3rd season)
- Base defense: 4–3
- MVP: Justin Tuck
- Home stadium: Notre Dame Stadium

2004 NCAA Division I-A independents football records
	Conf.			Overall
Team	W		L	W		L
No. 24 Navy		–		10	–	2
Notre Dame		–		6	–	6
Florida A&M		–		3	–	8
Rankings from AP Poll

The 2004 Notre Dame Fighting Irish football team was an American football team that represented the University of Notre Dame as an independent during the 2004 NCAA Division I-A football season. In their third and final year under head coach Tyrone Willingham, the Irish compiled a 6–6 record, scored 289 points, and also gave up 289 points on defense. They lost four of their last five games, including a loss to Oregon State in the Insight Bowl. Willingham was fired on November 30, and defensive coordinator Kent Baer took over as interim head coach for the Insight Bowl.

The team's statistical leaders included quarterback Brady Quinn (2,586 passing yards), running back Darius Walker (786 rushing yards), wide receiver Rhema McKnight (42 receptions for 610 yards), and kicker D.J. Fitzpatrick (67 points scored, 34 of 35 PAT, 11 of 15 field goals). Defensive end Justin Tuck won the team's most valuable player award.

The team played its home games at Notre Dame Stadium in Notre Dame, Indiana.

== Schedule ==
Date	Time	Opponent	Rank	Site	TV	Result	Attendance
September 4	9:15 p.m.	at BYU		LaVell Edwards Stadium; Provo, UT	ESPN	L 17–20	65,251
September 11	3:30 p.m.	No. 8 Michigan		Notre Dame Stadium; Notre Dame, IN (rivalry)	NBC	W 28–20	80,795
September 18	7:00 p.m.	at Michigan State		Spartan Stadium; East Lansing, MI (rivalry)	ESPN	W 31–24	74,962
September 25	2:30 p.m.	Washington		Notre Dame Stadium; Notre Dame, IN	NBC	W 38–3	80,795
October 2	2:30 p.m.	No. 15 Purdue		Notre Dame Stadium; Notre Dame, IN (rivalry)	NBC	L 16–41	80,795
October 9	2:30 p.m.	Stanford		Notre Dame Stadium; Notre Dame, IN (rivalry)	NBC	W 23–15	80,795
October 16	12:00 p.m.	at Navy		Giants Stadium; East Rutherford, NJ (rivalry)	CBS	W 27–9	76,166
October 23	1:30 p.m.	Boston College	No. 24	Notre Dame Stadium; Notre Dame, IN (Holy War)	NBC	L 23–24	80,795
November 6	3:30 p.m.	at No. 9 Tennessee		Neyland Stadium; Knoxville, TN	CBS	W 17–13	107,266
November 13	2:30 p.m.	Pittsburgh	No. 24	Notre Dame Stadium; Notre Dame, IN (rivalry)	NBC	L 38–41	80,795
November 27	8:00 p.m.	at No. 1 USC		Los Angeles Memorial Coliseum; Los Angeles, CA (rivalry)	ABC	L 10–41	92,611
December 28	9:45 p.m.	vs. Oregon State		Bank One Ballpark; Phoenix, AZ (Insight Bowl)	ESPN	L 21–38	45,917
Rankings from AP Poll released prior to the game; All times are in Eastern time

== Preseason ==
The 2004 season began with doubts and criticism for the Irish. With Julius Jones graduating as fourth-leading rusher in Notre Dame history, the Irish hoped to replace him with a talented recruiting class. However, Willingham struggled in his second full year of recruiting and the new class was ranked 30th in the nation. Despite signing highly sought after recruit Darius Walker, the 17 man class only included three four-star recruits.

== Game summaries ==
=== BYU ===
The season began poorly for the Irish with a loss at BYU. Despite Brady Quinn improving at the quarterback position, completing over 50 percent of his passes for 265 yards, the Irish only managed to gain 11 yards rushing.

=== Michigan ===
Team	1	2	3	4	Total
Michigan	6	3	3	8	20
• Notre Dame	0	0	7	21	28

- Date: September 11
- Location: Notre Dame Stadium, South Bend, IN
- Game start: 3:30 p.m. EST
- Television network: NBC

Scoring summary
1	8:29	Michigan	Garrett Rivas 38-yard field goal	Michigan 3-0
1	0:11	Michigan	Garrett Rivas 33-yard field goal	Michigan 6-0
2	0:00	Michigan	Garrett Rivas 22-yard field goal	Michigan 9-0
3	11:02	Notre Dame	Matt Shelton 46-yard pass from Brady Quinn (D.J. Fitzpatrick kick)	Michigan 9-7
3	5:57	Michigan	Garrett Rivas 47-yard field goal	Michigan 12-7
4	13:48	Notre Dame	Darius Walker 6-yard run (D.J. Fitzpatrick kick)	Notre Dame 14-12
4	11:23	Notre Dame	Darius Walker 5-yard run (D.J. Fitzpatrick kick)	Notre Dame 21-12
4	5:49	Notre Dame	Rashon Powers-Neal 8-yard pass from Brady Quinn (D.J. Fitzpatrick kick)	Notre Dame 28-12
4	2:27	Michigan	Steve Breaston 25-yard pass from Chad Henne (Steve Breaston pass from Chad Henne)	Notre Dame 28-20

Notre Dame next faced a highly ranked Michigan team at home and Willingham stated that an improved running game would be important if the Irish were to be able to beat the Wolverines. Darius Walker answered Willingham in his first collegiate game, gaining 115 yards and scoring two late touchdowns to lead the Irish in the upset. With the win the Irish were rejuvenated,

=== Michigan State ===
Team	1	2	3	4	Total
• Notre Dame	14	7	7	3	31
Michigan St	7	0	7	10	24

- Date: September 18
- Location: Spartan Stadium, East Lansing, MI
- Game start: 7:00 p.m. EST

Scoring summary
1	12:18	MSU	Jerramy Scott recovered blocked punt in end zone (Dave Rayner kick)	Michigan St 7–0
1	4:42	ND	Brady Quinn 1-yard run (D.J. Fitzpatrick kick)	Tie 7–7
1	:07	ND	Tom Zbikowski 75-yard fumble return (D.J. Fitzpatrick kick)	Notre Dame 14–7
2	8:52	ND	Matt Shelton 35-yard pass from Brady Quinn (D.J. Fitzpatrick kick)	Notre Dame 21–7
3	5:39	ND	Ryan Grant 6-yard run (D.J. Fitzpatrick kick)	Notre Dame 28–7
3	5:28	MSU	DeAndra' Cobb 89-yard kick return (Dave Rayner kick)	Notre Dame 28–14
4	14:55	MSU	Dave Rayner 46-yard field goal	Notre Dame 28–17
4	:57	ND	D.J. Fitzpatrick 23-yard field goal	Notre Dame 31–17
4	:09	MSU	Drew Stanton 4-yard run (Dave Rayner kick)	Notre Dame 31–24

The Irish rallied to move to 3–1 on the season with wins over Michigan State and Washington. Some in the media began comparing Willingham to some of Notre Dame's legendary coaches and said the team would win seven or eight games in the season, and be back in national championship contention by 2005.

=== Purdue ===
With renewed expectations, the Irish hoped to continue their streak and beat 15th ranked Purdue, who hadn't won at Notre Dame in 30 years. The Boilermakers' quarterback, Kyle Orton, torched the Irish defense handing them a 25-point loss to end the rally.

=== Stanford ===
The Irish got back on track and beat Stanford, making Notre Dame the second school to reach 800 wins.

=== Navy ===
Notre Dame defeated Navy for the 41st straight time, to move into the rankings for the first time since their 2003 loss to Michigan.

=== Boston College ===
The Irish didn't stay ranked for long, as Boston College once again beat the Irish on a late score.

=== Tennessee ===
The Irish had three games left, and needed one win to become bowl eligible, but looked as if that win wouldn't come in their next game as they faced the 9th ranked Tennessee Volunteers in Knoxville. The Irish defense, however, stepped up, and, after knocking out quarterback Erik Ainge on a sack, returned an interception for a touchdown to upset the Volunteers and become bowl eligible.

=== Pittsburgh ===
Once again ranked, the Irish returned home for their final home game against Pittsburgh. Losing on a late score, the team allowed five passing touchdowns by an opponent for the first time ever at home.

=== USC ===
Visiting USC for the final regular season game, the Irish again lost to the Trojans by 31.

=== Oregon State (Insight Bowl) ===
Notre Dame vs. Oregon State

Team	1	2	3	4	Total
Fighting Irish	0	7	7	7	21
• Beavers	14	7	3	14	38

- Date: December 28
- Location: Bank One Ballpark
- Game start: 6:45 p.m. PST
- Game attendance: 45,917
- Television network: ESPN

Scoring summary
1	9:24	ORST	George Gillett 12 yard pass from Derek Anderson (Alexis Serna kick)	Oregon State 7–0
1	5:41	ORST	Joe Newton 11 yard pass from Derek Anderson (Alexis Serna kick)	Oregon State 14–0
2	7:49	ORST	Dan Haines 11 yard pass from Derek Anderson (Alexis Serna kick)	Oregon State 21–0
2	:56	ND	Anthony Fasano 13 yard pass from Brady Quinn (D.J. Fitzpatrick kick)	Oregon State 21–7
3	9:16	ORST	Alexis Serna 38 yard field goal	Oregon State 24–7
3	2:40	ND	Darius Walker 5 yard run (D.J. Fitzpatrick kick)	Oregon State 24–14
4	12:17	ORST	Joe Newton 1 yard pass from Derek Anderson (Alexis Serna kick)	Oregon State 31–14
4	4:52	ND	Rhema McKnight 18 yard pass from Brady Quinn (D.J. Fitzpatrick kick)	Oregon State 31–21
4	3:19	ORST	Dwight Wright Jr. 2 yard run (Alexis Serna kick)	Oregon State 38–21

The Irish accepted a bid to play in the Insight Bowl, however, in a highly criticized move, two days later fired Willingham. Defensive coordinator, Kent Baer, led the Irish, hoping to "win one for Ty," however, the Oregon State Beavers, led by four touchdown passes from Derek Anderson, beat the Irish in their seventh consecutive bowl loss. The Beavers never trailed in the game, and easily defeated the Irish 38–21. Oregon State quarterback Derek Anderson threw for 359 yards and four touchdown passes, with no interceptions

The Irish ended 2004 with a 6–6 record and in need of a coach.

== Aftermath of the Willingham firing ==
In firing Willingham, the Notre Dame athletic department cited a relatively poor record of 21–15, a weak recruiting class, and three losses, each by 31 points, to rival USC. However, the Irish also hoped to entice Urban Meyer, the head coach of Utah, to lead Notre Dame. Meyer had just led the Utes to an undefeated season and he had a clause in his contract that stated he could leave Utah without a penalty to coach for the Irish. When Meyer instead took the head coaching position at Florida, the Irish were ridiculed in the media, saying that the Notre Dame coaching position is no longer as prestigious as it was in the past. After over a week without a coach, the Irish hired New England Patriots' offensive coordinator Charlie Weis as head coach. Weis was an alum of Notre Dame, and became the first alum to coach the team since 1963. At least one sports writer stated that Weis was a choice that made sense for the program. Notwithstanding, after the fact Willingham's firing remained controversial with some believing he was treated unfairly.

== Statistics ==
Passing

1. Brady Quinn - 191 of 353 (54.1%) for 2,586 yards, 17 touchdowns, and 10 interceptions, 125.87 efficiency
2. Pat Dillingham - 4 of 6 (66.7%) for 31 yards, 0 touchdowns, 0 interceptions, 110.07 efficiency

Rushing

1. Darius Walker - 786 yards on 185 carries, 4.2-yard average, 7 touchdowns
2. Ryan Grant - 515 yards on 127 carries, 4.1-yard average, 5 touchdowns
3. Marcus Wilson - 138 yards on 35 carries, 3.9-yard average, 1 touchdown

Receiving

1. Rhema McKnight - 42 receptions for 610 yards, 14.5-yard average, 3 touchdowns
2. Matt Shelton - 20 receptions for 515 yards, 25.8-yard average, 6 touchdowns
3. Anthony Fasano - 27 receptions for 367 yards, 13.6-yard average, 4 touchdowns
4. Maurice Stovall - 21 receptions for 313 yards, 14.9-yard average, 1 touchdown
5. Jeff Samardzija - 17 receptions for 274 yards, 16.1-yard average, 0 touchdowns

Scoring

1. D.J. Fitzpatrick (PK) - 67 points, 34 of 35 PAT, 11 of 15 field goals
2. Darius Walker (RB) - 42 points, 7 touchdowns
3. Matt Shelton (WR) - 36 points, 6 touchdowns
4. Ryan Grant (RB) - 30 points, 5 touchdowns
5. Anthony Fasano (TE) - 24 points, 4 touchdowns

Punt returns

1. Carlyle Holiday - 29 returns for 314 yards, 10.8-yard average, 0 touchdowns

Tackles

1. Mike Goolsby - 97 total tackles, 43 solo tackles
2. Brandon Hoyte - 74 total tackles, 39 solo tackles
3. Quentin Burrell - 72 total tackles, 42 solo tackles
4. Tom Zbikowski - 70 total tackles, 37 solo tackles
5. Derek Curry - 65 total tackles, 42 solo tackles

== Roster ==
2004 Notre Dame Fighting Irish football team roster
Players
Coaches
Offense

Pos.	#	Name	Class
TE	1	Jared Clark	Sr
RB	3	Darius Walker	Fr
RB	4	Ryan Grant	Sr
WR	5	Rhema McKnight	Jr
WR	7	Carlyle Holiday	Sr
QB	8	Marty Mooney	Jr
QB	9	Pat Dillingham	Sr
QB	10	Brady Quinn	So
RB	11	Marcus Wilson	Sr
FB	12	Josh Schmidt	Sr
QB	13	David Wolke	Fr
FB	16	Rashon Powers-Neal	Sr
QB	16	Stan Revelle	Sr
QB	17	J.J. Warren	So
QB	18	Darrin Bragg	Fr
WR	21	Maurice Stovall	Jr
WR	23	Chase Anastasio	So
FB	25	Nate Schiccatano	Jr
RB	26	Travis Thomas	So
RB	27	John Lyons	So
FB	28	Cole Laux	Sr
RB	32	Jeff Jenkins	Jr
RB	33	Justin Hoskins	Fr
TE	48	Jerome Collins	Sr
OL	50	Dan Santucci	Jr
OL	51	Jamie Ryan	Jr
OL	54	David Fitzgerald	Jr
C	55	Zachary Giles	Sr
OL	59	James Bent	Jr
OT	62	Scott Raridon	Jr
OL	64	Casey Dunn	Sr
OL	67	John Kadous	Fr
OL	68	Ryan Harris	So
G	69	Darin Mitchell	Sr
OL	70	Chauncey Incarnato	Fr
OL	71	James Bonelli	Jr
OL	72	Jeff Thompson	Sr
OT	73	Mark LeVoir	Sr
G	74	Dan Stevenson	Sr
G	76	Bob Morton	Jr
C	78	John Sullivan	So
OL	79	Brian Mattes	Jr
WR	80	Chris Vaughn	Fr
WR	81	Brandon Harris	Jr
WR	82	Matt Shelton	Sr
WR	83	Jeff Samardzija	So
WR	84	Mike O'Hara	Jr
WR	84	Rob Woods	Jr
TE	85	Billy Palmer	Sr
TE	87	Marcus Freeman	Jr
TE	88	Anthony Fasano	Jr
TE	89	John Carlson	So

Defense

Pos.	#	Name	Class
DB	2	Freddie Parish IV	So
CB	6	Carlos Campbell	Sr
FS	8	Quentin Burrell	Sr
DB	9	Tom Zbikowski	So
CB	15	Preston Jackson	Sr
DB	18	Chinedum Ndukwe	So
CB	22	Ambrose Wooden	So
CB	24	Dwight Ellick	Sr
DB	26	Wade Iams	Fr
DB	27	Lionel Bolen	Sr
DB	28	Tregg Duerson	Fr
CB	30	Mike Richardson	Jr
FS	31	Jake Carney	Jr
DB	31	A.J. Cedeno	So
DB	34	Terrail Lambert	Fr
DB	37	Junior Jabbie	Fr
CB	37	Matt Mitchell	Jr
DB	38	Leo Ferrine	Fr
LB	39	Brandon Hoyte	Sr
LB	40	Maurice Crum Jr.	Fr
LB	41	Mike Goolsby	Sr
LB	42	Anthony Vernaglia	Fr
LB	43	Anthony Salvador	Jr
DE	44	Justin Tuck	Sr
DB	45	Rich Whitney III	Jr
LB	46	Corey Mays	Sr
LB	47	Mitchell Thomas	So
LB	49	Derek Curry	Sr
LB	52	Joe Brockington	So
LB	53	Joseph Boland	Jr
LB	56	Nick Borseti	So
LB	58	Abdel Banda	Fr
DT	59	Dan Chervanick	Jr
LB	60	Casey Cullen	So
DE	65	Tim Gritzman	Fr
NG	66	Derek Landri	Jr
DE	75	Chris Frome	Jr
DT	77	Greg Pauly	Sr
DL	90	Brian Beidatsch	Sr
DE	92	Kyle Budinscak	Sr
DL	93	Brandon Nicolas	Fr
DE	94	Justin Brown	Fr
DE	95	Victor Abiamiri	So
DL	96	Matt Hasbrook	Jr
DE	97	Travis Leitko	Jr
DL	98	Trevor Laws	So
DL	99	Ronald Talley	Fr

Special teams

Pos.	#	Name	Class
P	17	Geoffrey Price	So
K	19	D.J. Fitzpatrick	Sr
K	45	Carl Gioia	So
LS	53	Dan Hickey	Jr
LS	61	J.J. Jansen	Fr
K	91	Craig Cardillo	Jr
K	96	Bobby Renkes	So

Head coach

- Tyrone Willingham

Coordinators/assistant coaches

- Kent Baer – Defensive Coordinator
- Mike Denbrock – Offensive Line
- Bill Diedrick – Offensive Coordinator/Quarterbacks
- Greg Mattison – Defensive Line
- John McDonell – Offensive Line
- Trent Miles – Receivers
- Buzz Preston – Running Backs
- Bob Simmons – Linebackers
- Steven Wilks – Secondary
- D.J. Durkin – Graduate Assistant
- Chad Klunder – Graduate Assistant
- Erica Genise – Director of Football Operations
- Jimmy Gonzales – Director of Personnel Development

Legend

- (C) Team captain
- (S) Suspended
- (I) Ineligible
- Injured
- Redshirt

Roster
