= Chuck Amato =

American football coach and player (born 1946)

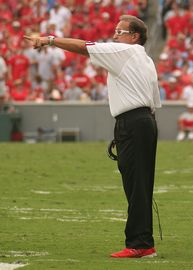
- Amato as head coach of North Carolina State in 2005

Biographical details
- Born: June 26, 1946; Easton, Pennsylvania, U.S.
- Died: October 19, 2026 (aged 80); Raleigh, North Carolina, U.S.

Playing career
- 1965–1967: NC State
- Position: Linebacker

Coaching career (HC unless noted)
- 1969–1970: Easton Area HS (PA) (assistant)
- 1971–1972: NC State (GA)
- 1973–1975: NC State (DB)
- 1976–1979: NC State (DC/LB)
- 1980–1981: Arizona (LB)
- 1982–1985: Florida State (DL)
- 1986–1995: Florida State (AHC/DL)
- 1996–1999: Florida State (AHC/LB)
- 2000–2006: NC State
- 2007–2009: Florida State (assoc. HC/LB)
- 2012–2017: Akron (AHC/DC)

Head coaching record
- Overall: 49–37
- Bowls: 4–1

Charles Michael Amato (June 26, 1946 – October 19, 2026) was an American college football coach and player. He was most recently the defensive coordinator for Akron. He served as the head football coach at North Carolina State University from 2000 to 2006, compiling a record of 49–37. On January 17, 2007, Amato returned to Florida State, where he had coached as assistant for nearly two decades before moving to NC State, as executive associate head coach and linebackers coach, a position he held for three seasons.

== Early life and education ==
Amato was born in Easton, Pennsylvania in the Lehigh Valley region of the state in an Italian American family from Castel di Lucio. He graduated from Easton Area High School, where boxer Larry Holmes was one of his classmates. Amato attended North Carolina State University, where he graduated with a Bachelor of Science in mathematics in 1969 and a master's degree in education in 1973.

At North Carolina State, Amato was a three-year letter winner in both football and wrestling. He played linebacker on the 1965 team that won an Atlantic Coast Conference co–championship and posted two undefeated seasons as a wrestler, winning two ACC titles at heavyweight in 1966 and at the 191-pound (87 kg) weight class in 1968.

== Coaching career ==
=== Easton High School ===
Following his graduation from North Carolina State, Amato spent two years as an assistant coach at his high school alma mater, Easton High School.

=== North Carolina State ===
In 1971, Amato began a nine-year stint as an assistant coach with North Carolina State, working under Al Michaels, Lou Holtz, and Bo Rein.

=== Arizona and Florida State ===
He then spent two seasons at the University of Arizona (1980 and 1981), where he served as the linebackers coach. He then joined Florida State University, where he spent 18 years in various defensive football coaching capacities, including that of assistant head coach for 14 years. At Florida State, he was defensive line coach for 14 years and spent four seasons as linebacker coach.

=== North Carolina State head coach ===
In 2002, Amato was elected to the American Football Coaches Association Board of Trustees.

Amato accumulated an overall record of 49–37, including a record of 34–17 during the four-year period from 2000 through 2003 while Philip Rivers was the starting quarterback. Amato's most successful season was in 2002 when the Wolfpack defeated Notre Dame in the Gator Bowl to cap off an 11–win season in which his team finished No. 12 in the AP Poll.

After Rivers graduated, Amato's NC State teams finished 5–6 in 2004, 7–5 in 2005, and 3–9 in 2006.

On November 26, 2006, Amato was fired by NC State athletics director Lee Fowler after a seven–game losing streak to close the 2006 season. Noted losses include an upset by the Akron Zips (5–7), a third straight loss to the North Carolina Tar Heels (3–9), and a loss at home to the East Carolina Pirates (7–5). Highlights of the 2006 season include wins against the Boston College Eagles and the Florida State Seminoles. In a statement, Fowler acknowledged Amato's "excitement and enthusiasm." This enthusiasm fueled an $87 million renovation to Carter–Finley Stadium. Nonetheless, mediocre 2005 and 2006 seasons led to the decision remove Amato and "to take the program in a new direction."

=== Florida State ===
In 2007, Amato returned to Florida State University as executive associate head coach and linebackers coach. In December 2009 with the retirement of Bobby Bowden, Amato was notified by new Florida State Head Coach Jimbo Fisher that he will not be retained on staff. Amato coached the 2010 Gator Bowl game and was subsequently released from the Florida State program. In December 2009, Amato was diagnosed with neck and throat cancer. After a successful six week treatment, he vowed to return to coaching in 2011.

=== Akron ===
Amato returned to coaching for the 2012 season as the associate head coach and defensive coordinator under Terry Bowden. Amato retired from Akron in February 2018.

== Death ==
Amato died at his home in Raleigh on October 19, 2026 from throat cancer. He was 80.

== Head coaching record ==
Year	Team	Overall	Conference	Standing	Bowl/playoffs	Coaches^{#}	AP^{°}
NC State Wolfpack (Atlantic Coast Conference) (2000–2006)
2000	NC State	8–4	4–4	5th	W MicronPC.com		
2001	NC State	7–5	4–4	T–4th	L Tangerine		
2002	NC State	11–3	5–3	4th	W Gator	11	12
2003	NC State	8–5	4–4	T–4th	W Tangerine		
2004	NC State	5–6	3–5	T–8th			
2005	NC State	7–5	3–5	T–4th (Atlantic)	W Meineke Car Care		
2006	NC State	3–9	2–6	6th (Atlantic)			
NC State:		49–37	25–31				
Total:		49–37					
^{#}Rankings from final Coaches Poll.; ^{°}Rankings from final AP Poll.

=== ACC championships ===
Amato has been a part of 11 ACC championships, one as a player at North Carolina State (1965), two as an assistant coach for North Carolina State (1973 and 1979), and eight consecutive seasons at Florida State (1992 through 1999).
