= Courtney Watson =

Courtney Watson may refer to:

- Courtney Watson (American football)
- Courtney Watson (politician)
