= 2002 All-America college football team =

Official list of the best college football players of 2002

The 2002 All-America college football team is composed of the following All-American Teams: Associated Press (AP), Football Writers Association of America (FWAA), American Football Coaches Association (AFCA), Walter Camp Foundation (WCFF), The Sporting News (TSN), Pro Football Weekly (PFW), Sports Illustrated (CNNSI) and ESPN.

The College Football All-America Team is an honor given annually to the best American college football players at their respective positions. The original usage of the term All-America seems to have been to such a list selected by football pioneer Walter Camp in the 1890s. To be selected a consensus All-American, players must be chosen to the first team on at least two of the five official selectors as recognized by the NCAA. Second- and third-team honors are used to break ties. Players named first-team by all five selectors are deemed unanimous All-Americans. The NCAA officially recognizes All-Americans selected by the AP, AFCA, FWAA, TSN, and the WCFF to determine Consensus All-Americans.

Fourteen players were recognized as consensus All-Americans for 2002, 7 of them unanimously. Unanimous selections are followed by an asterisk (*)

2002 Consensus All-Americans
Name	Position	Year	University
Carson Palmer	Quarterback	Senior	USC
Larry Johnson*	Running back	Senior	Penn State
Willis McGahee	Running back	Sophomore	Miami (FL)
Charles Rogers*	Wide receiver	Junior	Michigan State
Reggie Williams	Wide receiver	Sophomore	Washington
Rashaun Woods	Wide receiver	Junior	Oklahoma State
Dallas Clark*	Tight end	Senior	Iowa
Brett Romberg	Center	Senior	Miami (FL)
Shawn Andrews	Offensive line	Sophomore	Arkansas
Eric Steinbach	Offensive line	Senior	Iowa
Derrick Dockery	Offensive line	Senior	Texas
Jordan Gross	Offensive line	Senior	Utah
Terrell Suggs*	Defensive line	Senior	Arizona State
David Pollack	Defensive line	Sophomore	Georgia
Rien Long	Defensive line	Junior	Washington State
Tommie Harris	Defensive line	Sophomore	Oklahoma
Teddy Lehman	Linebacker	Junior	Oklahoma
E. J. Henderson	Linebacker	Senior	Maryland
Matt Wilhelm	Linebacker	Senior	Ohio State
Mike Doss*	Defensive back	Senior	Ohio State
Terence Newman*	Defensive back	Senior	Kansas State
Shane Walton*	Defensive back	Senior	Notre Dame
Troy Polamalu	Defensive back	Senior	USC
Mike Nugent	Kicker	Sophomore	Ohio State
Derek Abney	Kick returner	Junior	Kentucky
Mark Mariscal	Punter	Junior	Colorado

== Offense ==
=== Quarterback ===
- Carson Palmer, Southern California (AP-1, FWAA, TSN, CNNSI, ESPN, WCFF-2)
- Ken Dorsey, Miami (Fla.) (AFCA, WCFF (tie), AP-3)
- Brad Banks, Iowa (WCFF (tie), AP-2)
- Byron Leftwich, Marshall (PFW)

=== Running back ===
- Larry Johnson, Penn State (AP-1, AFCA, FWAA, WCFF, TSN, PFW, CNNSI, ESPN)
- Willis McGahee, Miami (Fla.) (AP-1, FWAA, WCFF, TSN, PFW, CNNSI, ESPN)
- Chris Brown, Colorado (AFCA, AP-2, WCFF-2)
- Quentin Griffin, Oklahoma (AP-2, WCFF-2)
- Avon Cobourne, West Virginia (AP-3)
- Steven Jackson, Oregon State (AP-3)

=== Wide receiver ===
- Charles Rogers, Michigan State (AP-1, AFCA, FWAA, WCFF, TSN, PFW, CNNSI, ESPN)
- Reggie Williams, Washington (AP-1, FWAA, ESPN)
- Rashaun Woods, Oklahoma State (WCFF, TSN, CNNSI, AP-2)
- Nate Burleson, Nevada (AFCA, AP-2, WCFF-2)
- Brandon Lloyd, Illinois (PFW)
- J. R. Tolver, San Diego State (WCFF-2)
- Andre Johnson, Miami (AP-3)
- Shaun McDonald, Arizona State (AP-3)

=== Tight end ===
- Dallas Clark, Iowa (AP-1, AFCA, FWAA, WCFF, TSN, CNNSI, ESPN)
- Bennie Joppru, Michigan (PFW, AP-3)
- Kellen Winslow II, Miami (AP-2, WCFF-2)

=== Offensive line ===
- Shawn Andrews, Arkansas (AP-1, AFCA, FWAA, TSN, CNNSI, ESPN, WCFF-2)
- Jordan Gross, Utah (AP-1, FWAA, WCFF, PFW, CNNSI, ESPN)
- Brett Romberg, Miami (Fla.) (AP-1, AFCA, FWAA, WCFF, CNNSI)
- Eric Steinbach, Iowa (AP-1, AFCA, WCFF, TSN, PFW, ESPN)
- Derrick Dockery, Texas (AP-1, FWAA, WCFF)
- Brett Williams, Florida State (AFCA, TSN, AP-2, WCFF-2)
- Derrick Roche, Washington State (AFCA, AP-2, WCFF-2)
- Bruce Nelson, Iowa (FWAA, CNNSI, AP-3)
- Jeff Faine, Notre Dame (TSN, PFW, ESPN, AP-2, WCFF-2)
- Wayne Lucier, Colorado (TSN)
- Jon Stinchcomb, Georgia (WCFF, AP-2)
- Robert Gallery, Iowa (PFW)
- Torrin Tucker, Southern Mississippi (PFW)
- Vince Manuwai, Hawaii (CNNSI, AP-2, WCFF-2)
- Todd Wike, Maryland (ESPN)
- Steve Sciullo, Marshall (WCFF-2)
- Sherko Haji-Rasouli, Miami (AP-3)
- Montrae Holland, Florida State (AP-3)
- Will Ofenheusle, Tennessee (AP-3)
- Mike Saffer, UCLA (AP-3)

== Defense ==
=== Ends ===
- Terrell Suggs, Arizona State (WCFF, AP-1, FWAA, AFCA, TSN, PFW, CNNSI, ESPN)
- David Pollack, Georgia (AP-1, FWAA, TSN, PFW, CNNSI, ESPN, WCFF-2)
- Calvin Pace, Wake Forest (AFCA, AP-3)
- Michael Haynes, Penn State (FWAA, CNNSI, AP-2, WCFF-2)
- Cory Redding, Texas (WCFF, AP-2)
- Jarret Johnson, Alabama (AP-3)

=== Tackle ===
- Tommie Harris, Oklahoma (AP-1, AFCA, WCFF)
- Rien Long, Washington State (AP-1, FWAA, TSN, CNNSI, ESPN)
- Jimmy Kennedy, Penn State (WCFF, TSN, PFW, ESPN, AP-3)
- Jerome McDougle, Miami (Fla.) (AFCA, AP-2, WCFF-2)
- Dewayne Robertson, Kentucky (PFW)
- Dan Klecko, Temple (AP-2)
- William Joseph, Miami (WCFF-2, AP-3)

=== Linebacker ===
- Teddy Lehman, Oklahoma (AP-1, FWAA, WCFF, TSN, CNNSI, ESPN)
- E.J. Henderson, Maryland (AP-1, AFCA, FWAA, WCFF, PFW, CNNSI, ESPN)
- Matt Wilhelm, Ohio State (AP-1, FWAA, TSN, CNNSI)
- Boss Bailey, Georgia (AFCA, WCFF, AP-2)
- Bradie James, LSU (TSN, AFCA, AP-2, WCFF-2)
- Rod Davis, Southern Mississippi (PFW, AP-3)
- LaMarcus McDonald, TCU (PFW, AP-2)
- Courtney Watson, Notre Dame (ESPN, WCFF-2, AP-3)
- Gerald Hayes, Pittsburgh (WCFF-2, AP-3)

=== Cornerback ===
- Terence Newman, Kansas State (AP-1, AFCA, FWAA, WCFF, TSN, CNNSI, ESPN)
- Shane Walton, Notre Dame (AP-1, AFCA, FWAA, WCFF, TSN, PFW, CNNSI)
- Marlin Jackson, Michigan (PFW, AP-2)
- Marcus Trufant, Washington State,(ESPN, AP-2)
- Rod Babers, Texas (AP-3)
- Vontez Duff, Notre Dame (AP-3)
- Chris Gamble, Ohio State (AP-3)

=== Safety ===
- Mike Doss, Ohio State (AP-1, AFCA, FWAA, WCFF, TSN, PFW, CNNSI, ESPN)
- Troy Polamalu, Southern California (AP-1, FWAA, WCFF, ESPN)
- Brandon Everage, Oklahoma (AFCA, PFW, AP-2, WCFF-2)
- Terrence Holt, North Carolina State (TSN, AP-2, WCFF-2)
- Jim Leonhard, Wisconsin (CNNSI, WCFF-2, AP-3)
- Derrick Strait, Oklahoma (WCFF-2)

== Special teams ==
=== Kicker ===
- Mike Nugent, Ohio State (AFCA, WCFF, AP-1)
- Nate Kaeding, Iowa (TSN, FWAA, PFW, CNNSI, ESPN, AP-2, WCFF-2)
- Billy Bennett, Georgia (AP-3)

=== Punter ===
- Mark Mariscal, Colorado (AP-1, AFCA, WCFF, TSN, CNNSI, ESPN)
- Andy Groom, Ohio State (FWAA, AP-2)
- Eddie Johnson, Idaho State (PFW)
- Glenn Pakulak, Kentucky (WCFF-2, AP-3)

=== All-purpose player / return specialist ===
- Derek Abney, Kentucky (AP-1, FWAA, WCFF, TSN, CNNSI-KR, ESPN)
- DeJuan Groce, Nebraska (AFCA, CNNSI-PR, AP-2, WCFF-2)
- Charles Pauley, San Jose State (AP-3)

== See also ==
- 2002 All-Atlantic Coast Conference football team
- 2002 All-Big 12 Conference football team
- 2002 All-Big Ten Conference football team
- 2002 All-Pacific-10 Conference football team
- 2002 All-SEC football team
