= Mike Denbrock =

American football player and coach (born 1964)

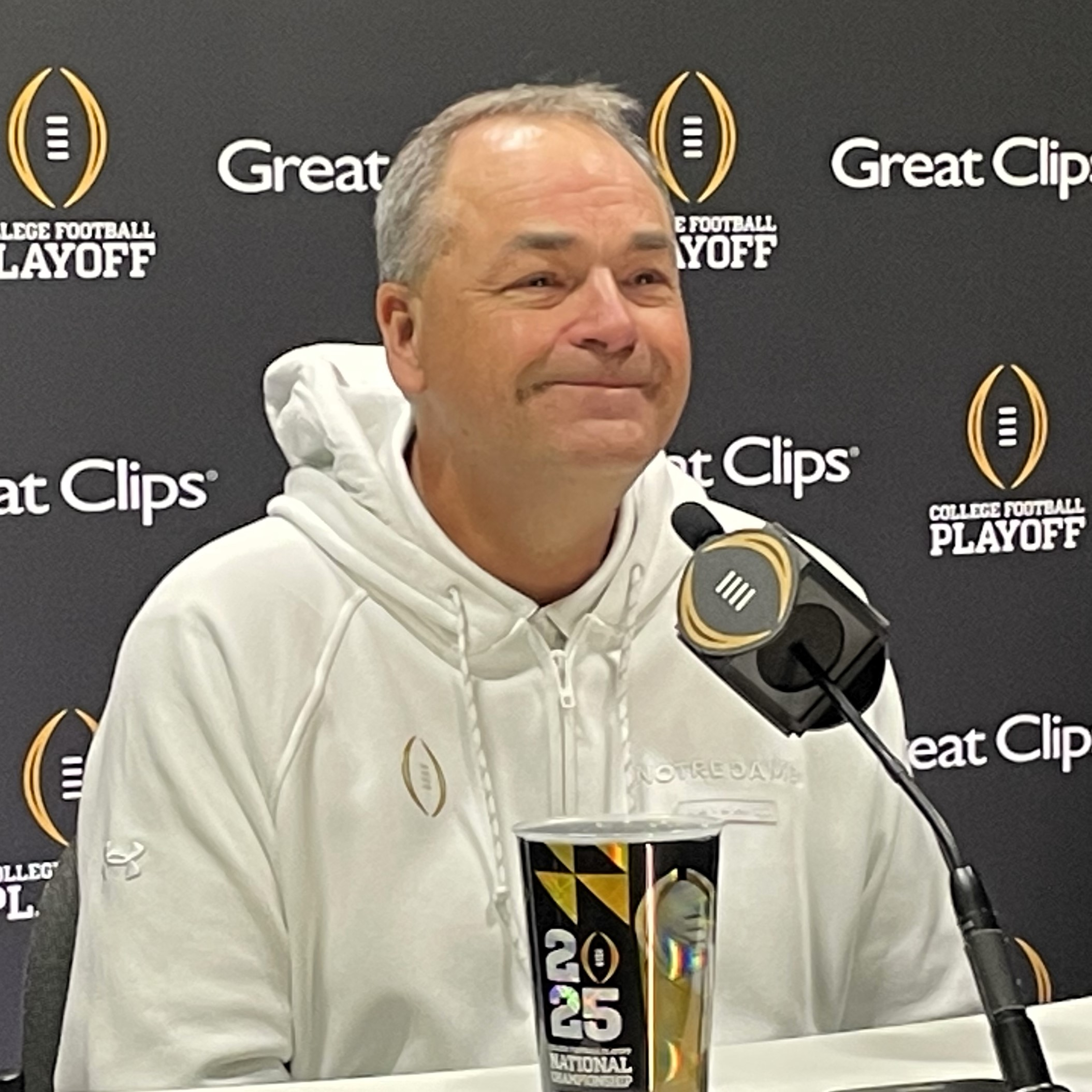
- Denbrock talking to press ahead of the 2025 CFP National Championship.

Current position
- Title: Offensive coordinator, tight ends coach
- Team: Notre Dame
- Conference: Independent

Biographical details
- Born: January 26, 1964 (age 62); Homer, Michigan, U.S.

Playing career
- 1982–1985: Grand Valley State
- Position: Tight end

Coaching career (HC unless noted)
- 1986–1987: Grand Valley State (GA)
- 1988–1989: Michigan State (GA)
- 1990–1991: Illinois State (OT/TE)
- 1992–1995: Grand Valley State (OC/QB/WR)
- 1996–1998: Grand Valley State (DC/LB)
- 1999–2000: Buffalo Destroyers (AHC/DC/OL/DL)
- 2001: Stanford (OT/TE)
- 2002–2004: Notre Dame (OT/TE)
- 2005–2008: Washington (OL)
- 2009: Indiana State (AHC/ST/LB)
- 2010–2011: Notre Dame (TE)
- 2012–2013: Notre Dame (WR)
- 2014: Notre Dame (OC/WR)
- 2015–2016: Notre Dame (AHC/WR)
- 2017: Cincinnati (OC/QB)
- 2018–2021: Cincinnati (OC/TE)
- 2022–2023: LSU (OC/TE)
- 2024–present: Notre Dame (OC/TE)

Michael Fredrick Denbrock (born January 29, 1964) is an American football coach who is the offensive coordinator and tight ends coach of the Notre Dame Fighting Irish. He has previously coached for the Stanford Cardinal, Washington Huskies, Cincinnati Bearcats, and LSU Tigers.

== Early coaching career ==
After graduating from Grand Valley State University in 1985 with a degree in communications, Denbrock returned to Grand Valley State as a graduate assistant, working with the offensive tackles and tight ends. In 1987, he first worked with Brian Kelly, who assisted with the defensive backs in his first season as a graduate assistant.

After two years, Denbrock moved on to Michigan State University where he helped with the quarterbacks and receivers on the 1988 Spartan squad that was selected for the Gator Bowl. The following season, he was moved to help with the offensive line as a graduate assistant on the 1989 team that played in the Aloha Bowl. His first full-time coaching assignment came in 1990, when he coached at Illinois State University, working with the offensive tackles and tight ends through.

In 1992, he returned to Grand Valley State, serving under Kelly, who was now head football coach. From 1992 to 1995, Denbrock was offensive coordinator, coaching the quarterbacks and wide receivers. His offense was first in the Midwest Intercollegiate Football Conference (MIFC) in both total yards and scoring offense from 1992 to 1994. He moved to defensive coordinator and linebackers coach from 1996 to 1998, where his defense ranked among the nation's top 30 in total defense, scoring defense and rushing defense each season. In 1996, his defense led the MIFC in scoring and total defense.

== Buffalo Destroyers ==
In 1999, he was part of the inaugural coaching staff for the Buffalo Destroyers of the Arena Football League (AFL). From 1999 to 2000, he held various coaching positions including associate head coach, defensive coordinator, as well as coaching the offensive and defensive lines. In his first season, his defense finished third in the league in both scoring and total defense, while in 2000, Denbrock helped the Destroyers land a playoff berth after a mid-season coaching change, where coach Dave Whinham was fired, being replaced by former NFL linebacker Ray Bentley.

== Return to college coaching ==
Denbrock returned to the college ranks in 2001, working with the offensive tackles and tight ends at Stanford University. His line helped lead the way for a Stanford rushing attack which ranked 23rd in the nation, averaging more than 200 yards per game and scoring 27 touchdowns.

=== First stint at Notre Dame ===
In 2002, Denbrock was hired at the University of Notre Dame, to coach offensive tackles and tight ends. He was hired by then new coach Tyrone Willingham, whom Denbrock served under at Stanford. From 2002 to 2004, Denbrock's offensive tackles and tight ends were big factors as the Irish produced 1,000-yard rushers in 2002 (Ryan Grant) and 2003 (Julius Jones). He also coached several players who later went onto NFL careers, including offensive linemen Ryan Harris, Jim Molinaro, Jordan Black and Brennan Curtin plus tight ends Anthony Fasano, Jerome Collins and John Carlson. Following Willingham's termination in 2004, new head coach Charlie Weis did not renew Denbrock's contract.

=== Other coaching destinations ===
In 2005, he was hired by the University of Washington to coach the offensive line, a position he held until 2008. In 2007, the Husky line helped running back Louis Rankin become the first 1,000-yard rusher at Washington since 1997. In 2009, Denbrock was hired by Indiana State University as the special teams coordinator, linebackers coach and associate head coach.

=== Second stint at Notre Dame ===
In 2010, Denbrock was hired by Brian Kelly, as he put together his inaugural coaching staff for the Irish. He spent the next two seasons coaching the tight ends, playing a major role in the development of future NFL tight ends Kyle Rudolph and Tyler Eifert. In 2011, Eifert was named a finalist for the Mackey Award, presented annually to college football's most outstanding tight end. Denbrock transitioned to coach the outside wide receivers and served as passing game coordinator in 2012 and 2013. Following the departure of offensive coordinator Chuck Martin to Miami University, Denbrock was named interim offensive coordinator for the 2013 Pinstripe Bowl vs Rutgers. On January 30, 2014, Denbrock was officially promoted to offensive coordinator.

=== Cincinnati Bearcats ===
On January 17, 2017, Luke Fickell, head football coach at University of Cincinnati, announced Denbrock as offensive coordinator and quarterbacks coach for the Cincinnati Bearcats. Denbrock counts eight NFL draft picks among his pupils, including a pair of Notre Dame tight ends with Cincinnati ties, the Cincinnati Bengals' draftee Tyler Eifert and Cincinnati-native Kyle Rudolph, who was drafted by the Minnesota Vikings.

=== LSU Tigers ===
Following Cincinnati's 2021 loss in the College Football Playoff to Alabama, it was announced that Denbrock would be reuniting with Brian Kelly at LSU as the offensive coordinator and tight ends coach. During the 2023 season, the Tigers offense had the top scoring and yards per game as well as that season's Heisman Trophy winning-quarterback, Jayden Daniels.

=== Third stint at Notre Dame ===
Denbrock would leave the LSU Tigers at the end of 2023 to return to Notre Dame as Offensive Coordinator under head coach Marcus Freeman.

== Personal life ==
Denbrock and his wife, Dianne, have one child.
