= 2002 NC State Wolfpack football team =

American college football team season

2002 NC State Wolfpack football

Gator Bowl champion

Gator Bowl, W 28–6 vs. Notre Dame
- Conference: Atlantic Coast Conference

Ranking
- Coaches: No. 11
- AP: No. 12
- Record: 11–3 (5–3 ACC)
- Head coach: Chuck Amato (3rd season)
- Offensive coordinator: Marty Galbraith (2nd season)
- Defensive coordinator: Chuck Amato (1st season)
- Home stadium: Carter–Finley Stadium

2002 Atlantic Coast Conference football standings
	Conf.			Overall
Team	W		L	W		L
No. 21 Florida State $	7	–	1	9	–	5
No. 22 Virginia	6	–	2	9	–	5
No. 13 Maryland	6	–	2	11	–	3
No. 12 NC State	5	–	3	11	–	3
Clemson	4	–	4	7	–	6
Georgia Tech	4	–	4	7	–	6
Wake Forest	3	–	5	7	–	6
North Carolina	1	–	7	3	–	9
Duke	0	–	8	2	–	10
$ – BCS representative as conference champion; Rankings from AP Poll

The 2002 NC State Wolfpack football team represented North Carolina State University during the 2002 NCAA Division I-A football season. The team's head coach was Chuck Amato. NC State has been a member of the Atlantic Coast Conference (ACC) since the league's inception in 1953. The Wolfpack played its home games in 2002 at Carter–Finley Stadium in Raleigh, North Carolina, which has been NC State football's home stadium since 1966.

== Schedule ==
Date	Time	Opponent	Rank	Site	TV	Result	Attendance	Source
August 24	4:30 pm	New Mexico*		Carter–Finley Stadium; Raleigh, North Carolina (BCA Classic)	FSN	W 34–14	47,018	
August 31	7:00 pm	East Tennessee State*	No. 25	Carter–Finley Stadium; Raleigh, North Carolina		W 34–0	42,507	
September 7	12:00 pm	at Navy*	No. 21	Navy–Marine Corps Memorial Stadium; Annapolis, Maryland		W 65–19	29,613	
September 14	7:00 pm	Wake Forest	No. 19	Carter–Finley Stadium; Raleigh, North Carolina (rivalry)		W 32–13	51,094	
September 21	12:30 pm	at Texas Tech*	No. 17	Jones SBC Stadium; Lubbock, Texas	FSN	W 51–48 ^{OT}	35,864	
September 28	1:00 pm	Massachusetts*	No. 17	Carter–Finley Stadium; Raleigh, North Carolina		W 56–24	51,221	
October 12	12:00 pm	at North Carolina	No. 14	Kenan Memorial Stadium; Chapel Hill, North Carolina (rivalry)	JPS	W 34–17	60,250	
October 19	12:00 pm	Duke	No. 13	Carter–Finley Stadium; Raleigh, North Carolina (rivalry)		W 24–22	51,500	
October 24	7:45 pm	at Clemson	No. 12	Memorial Stadium; Clemson, South Carolina (Textile Bowl)	ESPN	W 38–6	78,904	
November 2	3:30 pm	Georgia Tech	No. 10	Carter–Finley Stadium; Raleigh, North Carolina	ABC	L 17–24	51,500	
November 9	12:00 pm	at Maryland	No. 14	Byrd Stadium; College Park, Maryland	ABC	L 21–24	52,915	
November 16	12:00 pm	at Virginia	No. 22	Scott Stadium; Charlottesville, Virginia	JPS	L 9–14	53,371	
November 23	3:30 pm	No. 14 Florida State		Carter–Finley Stadium; Raleigh, North Carolina	ABC	W 17–7	51,500	
January 1	12:30 pm	vs. No. 11 Notre Dame*	No. 17	Alltel Stadium; Jacksonville, Florida (Gator Bowl)	NBC	W 28–6	73,491	
*Non-conference game; Rankings from AP Poll released prior to the game; All times are in Eastern time

== Roster ==
2002 NC State Wolfpack football team roster
Players
Coaches
Offense

Pos.	#	Name	Class
QB	17	Philip Rivers	Jr
RB	44	T. A. McLendon	Fr
G	54	Sean Locklear	Jr
OT		Scott Kooistra	Sr
WR	82	Jerricho Cotchery	Jr

Defense

Pos.	#	Name	Class
SS	9	Terrence Holt	Sr
CB	28	Lamont Reid	So
DB	36	Andre Maddox	So
LB	91	Manny Lawson	Fr

Special teams

Pos.	#	Name	Class
K	21	Adam Kiker	Jr

Head coach

- Chuck Amato

Coordinators/assistant coaches

- Doc Holliday – Asst. Head coach/Wide receivers
- Manny Diaz – Linebackers
- Todd Stroud – Strength and conditioning

Legend

- (C) Team captain
- (S) Suspended
- (I) Ineligible
- Injured
- Redshirt

Roster
Last update: 2019-08-04

== Rankings ==
Ranking movements Legend: ██ Increase in ranking ██ Decrease in ranking — = Not ranked RV = Received votes
	Week																	
Poll	Pre	1	2	3	4	5	6	7	8	9	10	11	12	13	14	15	16	Final
AP	RV	25	21	19	17	17	16	14	13	12	10	14	22	—	21	17	17	12
Coaches	25	24	22	20	16	15	14	11	10	9	8	13	20	—	20	17	17	11
BCS	Not released									11	9	12	—	—	—	—	—	Not released

== Game summaries ==
=== At Texas Tech ===
	1	2	3	4	OT	Total
No. 17 Wolfpack	10	7	21	7	6	51
Red Raiders	7	3	7	28	3	48

=== Vs. Notre Dame (Gator Bowl) ===
Gator Bowl

Team	1	2	3	4	Total
• Wolfpack	0	21	0	7	28
Fighting Irish	3	0	3	0	6

- Date: January 1, 2003
- Location: Alltel Stadium, Jacksonville, Florida
- Game start: 12:30 PM EST
- Elapsed time: 3:46
- Game attendance: 73,491
- TV announcers (NBC): Mike Breen (play-by-play), Pat Haden (analyst), Dave Burns, & Marty Snider (sideline reporters)

Scoring summary
1	5:09	ND	Nick Setta 23-yard field goal	ND 3-0
2	14:30	NCST	T.A. McLendon 2-yard run (Adam Kiker kick)	NCST 7-3
2	5:30	NCST	T.A. McLendon 3-yard run (Adam Kiker kick)	NCST 14-3
2	1:37	NCST	Jerricho Cotchery 9-yard pass from Philip Rivers (Adam Kiker kick)	NCST 21-3
3	2:50	ND	Nick Setta 41-yard field goal	NCST 21-6
4	10:50	NCST	Sean Berton 7-yard pass from Philip Rivers (Adam Kiker kick)	NCST 28-6

== 2003 NFL draft ==
Player	Position	Round	Pick	NFL club
Terrence Holt	Safety	5	137	Detroit Lions
Scott Kooistra	Offensive tackle	7	215	Cincinnati Bengals
