= 2003 Gator Bowl =

2003 Toyota Gator Bowl
- 58th Gator Bowl
NC State Wolfpack	Notre Dame Fighting Irish
(10–3)	(10–2)
ACC	Independent
28	6
Head coach: Chuck Amato	Head coach: Tyrone Willingham
AP / Coaches / BCS; 17 / 17 / —	AP / Coaches / BCS; 11 / 12 / 9
	1	2	3	4	Total
NC State	0	21	0	7	28
Notre Dame	3	0	3	0	6
- Date: January 1, 2003
- Season: 2002
- Stadium: Alltel Stadium
- Location: Jacksonville, Florida
- MVP: Philip Rivers (NCSU); Cedric Hilliard (ND)
- Favorite: NC State by 2
- Referee: Ed Ardito (C-USA)
- Attendance: 73,491

United States TV coverage
- Network: NBC
- Announcers: Mike Breen and Pat Haden

The 2003 Gator Bowl was a post-season American college football bowl game between the NC State Wolfpack and the Notre Dame Fighting Irish at Alltel Stadium. The 58th edition of the Gator Bowl, it was played in Jacksonville, Florida, on January 1, 2003. The game was the final contest of the 2002 NCAA Division I–A football season for both teams and ended in a 28–6 victory for NC State.

== Background ==
=== NC State ===
The Wolfpack had finished 4th in the Atlantic Coast Conference and were playing in a bowl game for the third consecutive year. At one point the Wolfpack were 9–0 and ranked at #8 in the Coaches Poll and #10 in the Media Poll before three straight losses knocked them out of the polls but they bounced back into the polls by beating Florida State in the last game of the regular season. This was their first appearance in the Gator Bowl since 1992.

=== Notre Dame ===
Notre Dame was in their first season under Tyrone Willingham and in their first bowl game since 2001. After achieving an 8–0 record, they were ranked as high as #4 in the Media Poll and #6 in the Coaches Poll before losing to Boston College in midseason and lost to USC in the last game of the regular season that cost them their shot at a BCS bowl game. This was Notre Dame's first Gator Bowl appearance since 1999.

== Game summary ==
T. A. McLendon ran for only 18 yards, but two of his 11 rushes were for touchdowns as Philip Rivers threw 23 of 37 for 228 yards and two touchdowns of his own as Notre Dame's defense allowed 21 points in the second quarter and the Irish never recovered, having more interceptions (3) than scores (2 field goals).

NC State would finish with an 11–3 record and the ACC's highest ranking, with final rankings of #11 in the Coaches Poll and #12 in the Media Poll. Notre Dame would finish with a 10–3 record and a #17 ranking in both Polls.
