= Ryan Grant (running back) =

American football player (born 1982)

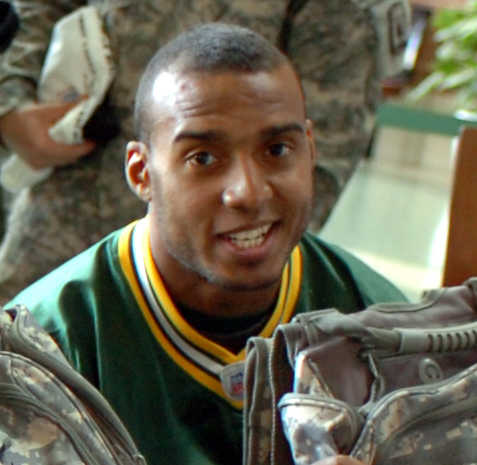
- Grant with the Green Bay Packers in 2009

No. 25
- Position: Running back

Personal information
- Born: December 9, 1982 (age 43); Suffern, New York, U.S.
- Listed height: 6 ft 1 in (1.85 m)
- Listed weight: 222 lb (101 kg)

Career information
- High school: Don Bosco Prep (Ramsey, New Jersey)
- College: Notre Dame (2001–2004)
- NFL draft: 2005: undrafted

Career history
- New York Giants (2005–2006); Green Bay Packers (2007–2011); Washington Redskins (2012); Green Bay Packers (2012)

Awards and highlights
- Super Bowl champion (XLV)

Career NFL statistics
- Rushing attempts: 956
- Rushing yards: 4,148
- Rushing touchdowns: 27
- Receptions: 93
- Receiving yards: 760
- Receiving touchdowns: 2
- Stats at Pro Football Reference

Ryan Brett Grant (born December 9, 1982) is an American former professional football player who was a running back in the National Football League (NFL). Grant played college football for the Notre Dame Fighting Irish, rushing for over 1,000 yards in his only year as the starting running back. He originally signed with the New York Giants as an undrafted free agent in 2005, but never played a game for them. Shortly before the 2007 season, Grant was traded to the Green Bay Packers in exchange for a future sixth-round draft pick. He would go on to play for the Packers for six seasons.

Grant had a successful first season with the Packers, rushing for almost 1,000 yards, including five 100+ yard games. He set franchise records with 201 rushing yards and three touchdowns in the Packers' divisional playoff game win against the Seattle Seahawks, as the Packers went on to reach the NFC Championship Game. Grant was also a member of the Packers Super Bowl XLV championship team that beat the Pittsburgh Steelers in 2010. He played for the Washington Redskins for one month during the 2012 season before returning to the Packers to finish out the year and his NFL career.

== Early life ==
Ryan Grant was born in Suffern, New York, but grew up in Nyack, New York, and attended Don Bosco Prep in Ramsey, New Jersey. He transferred to Clarkstown South High School near his hometown for one year before returning to Don Bosco. In 2000, his senior year, USA Today named him New Jersey Player of the Year. He rushed for nearly 1,000 yards and six touchdowns in Don Bosco Prep's run to an 11–1 record and the state championship game, which they lost to Holy Cross High School. That season Grant played cornerback as well, recording 61 tackles and 7 interceptions. In high school, Grant also played basketball and competed in track and field, where he was timed at 10.7 seconds in the 100 meter dash.

== College career ==
In 2001, Grant went to the University of Notre Dame to play football for the Fighting Irish while majoring in sociology and computer applications. He made just a few appearances during his freshman year, playing in five games as the back-up to Julius Jones under coach Bob Davie during a 5–6 season. Tyrone Willingham was named head coach for Grant's sophomore season and praised Grant for his attitude and desire to excel.

With Jones suspended for the 2002 season due to academic violations, Grant started all twelve games in 2002. He rushed for over 1,000 yards with nine touchdowns, including four games with over 100 yards. Grant's best game during his time at Notre Dame came against #15 ranked Air Force, as he gained 190 yards rushing and a touchdown in a 21–14 win. Notre Dame lost to North Carolina State 28–6 in the Gator Bowl. After peaking at #4 in late October, the team finished the season at 10–3 and ranked #17 on both the AP Poll and Coaches' Poll.

The 2003 season saw Grant split time with Julius Jones. After starting the first five games, Grant only managed 242 rushing yards before being benched. Jones took over in the fifth game and ran for 262 yards and two touchdowns against Pitt, a school record, in a 20–14 victory. After Jones' performance, Grant lost the starting job. He played as the backup in the final seven games, rushing for 268 yards; he finished his junior year with 510 yards and three touchdowns. Notre Dame finished the season 5–7.

During his senior year, Grant was named a team captain, but he split time with running back, Darius Walker. Playing in nine games, Grant only gained over 100 yards once, with 112 yards and two touchdowns in a 27–9 win over Navy. After injuring his hamstring, Grant's playing time was limited and Walker took over the starting job. Grant finished the year with 515 yards and 5 touchdowns, and Notre Dame finished with a record of 6–6. For his collegiate career, Grant ran for a total of 2,220 yards and 18 touchdowns.

=== College statistics ===
Year	Rushing				Receiving			
Year	Att	Yds	Avg	TD	Rec	Yds	Avg	TD
2001	29	110	3.8	1	2	7	3.5	0
2002	261	1,085	4.2	9	9	22	2.4	0
2003	143	510	3.6	3	9	64	7.1	0
2004	127	515	4.1	5	6	51	8.5	0
Totals	560	2,220	4.0	18	26	144	5.5	0
Source: Sports Illustrated

== Professional career ==
Grant applied for the 2005 NFL draft after his senior year and was invited to the 2005 NFL Scouting Combine, a week-long showcase for NFL hopefuls. Scouts did not credit Grant with exceptional speed, but he was clocked at 4.43 seconds in the 40-yard dash at the Combine.

Pre-draft measurables
Height	Weight	Arm length	Hand span	40-yard dash	10-yard split	20-yard split	20-yard shuttle	Three-cone drill	Vertical jump	Broad jump	Bench press	Wonderlic
6 ft 1 1/8 in (1.86 m)	215 lb (98 kg)	31 3/4 in (0.81 m)	8 1/2 in (0.22 m)	4.54 s	1.60 s	2.68 s	4.12 s	7.08 s	33.5 in (0.85 m)	9 ft 7 in (2.92 m)	17 reps	29
All values are from the 2005 NFL Scouting Combine.

=== New York Giants ===
Signing as an undrafted free agent, Grant spent 2005 on the New York Giants practice squad. He missed the entire 2006 season, however, after a non-football related injury threatened his career and never played a regular season game for the Giants. Grant was at a nightclub when someone bumped into him; when he went to brace himself, his left arm went through several champagne glasses, severing an artery, a tendon and the ulnar nerve in his left arm. Grant was at risk of bleeding to death and doctors at the time told him he might not regain the use of his left hand, although he did recover.

=== Green Bay Packers (first stint) ===
Grant was traded to the Packers on September 1, 2007, in exchange for a future sixth-round draft pick, and he played as the third-string running back behind Brandon Jackson and DeShawn Wynn for the first six games of the season. After Wynn suffered a shoulder injury in week 8, Grant took over in the second quarter against the Denver Broncos and ran for 104 yards in a 19–13 overtime win. He scored his first rushing touchdown on November 11 in a 34–0 win against the Minnesota Vikings. With these performances, Grant became the starting running back for the last seven weeks of the season. For the season, he averaged 5.1 yards per rush, had five 100+ yard games and eight rushing touchdowns. His mark of 929 yards in the final ten games of the season was second in the NFL for that time period to LaDainian Tomlinson, who had 944 yards. Grant was voted the FedEx Ground NFL Player of the Week twice in weeks 10 and 14.

In the Packers' divisional playoff game against the Seattle Seahawks, Grant fumbled twice in the first four minutes; both of the resulting drives led to touchdowns for the Seahawks. Despite the early deficit, the Packers were able to stage a comeback. Grant went on to rush for 201 yards and three touchdowns, both of which set franchise records for Packers' post-season games, as the Packers were 42–20 winners. The following week, Grant rushed for only 29 yards in a 23–20 overtime loss to the New York Giants in the NFC Championship game. He finished second overall for rushing yards in the 2007–08 playoffs with 230 yards, behind Laurence Maroney.

At the end of the 2007 season, Grant became an exclusive rights free agent. On August 4, 2008, he signed a four-year deal with the Packers worth up to $30 million. His first season under his new contract saw him run for 1,203 yards and score 5 total touchdowns. Even though he rushed for over a 1,000 yards, he averaged only 3.9 yards per attempt, the lowest figure of his career. After the trade of longtime quarterback Brett Favre before the start of the season, the Packers went 6–10 in 2008 and failed to qualify for the playoffs.

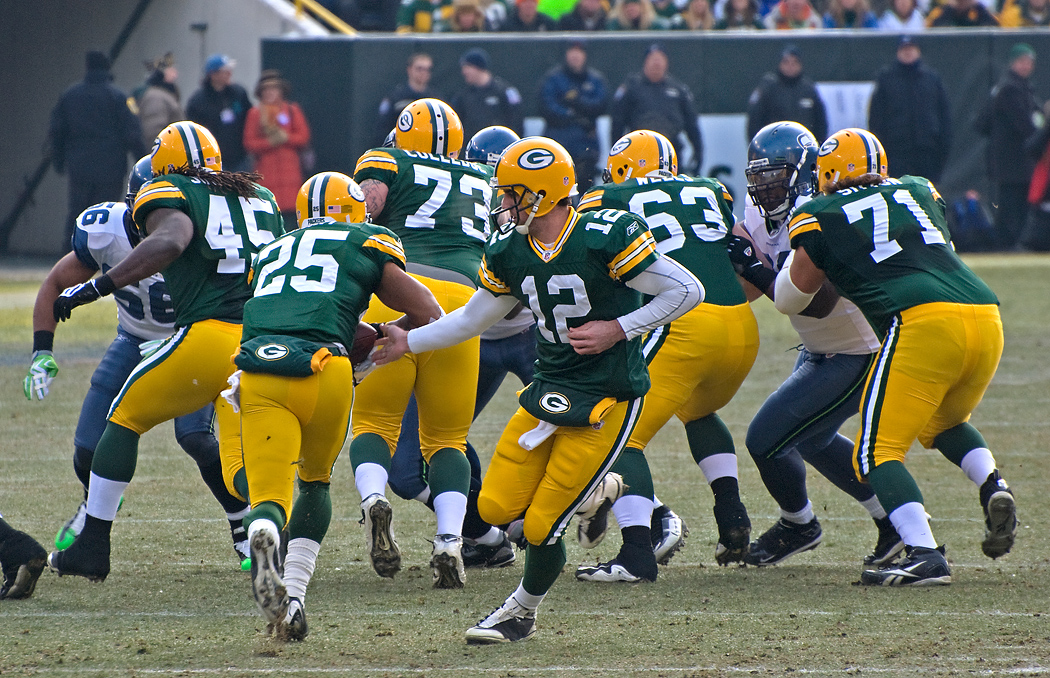
Ryan Grant (No. 25) running the ball during a game on December 27, 2009.

In 2009, Grant had a more productive year rushing for 1,253 yards, third in the National Football Conference (NFC), and scoring 11 touchdowns, second in the NFC. His average yards per carry rose to 4.4 and he added 25 catches for 197 yards. Under starting quarterback Aaron Rodgers, the Packers qualified for the playoffs, but lost their Wild Card game to the Arizona Cardinals in overtime 51–45. Grant rushed for 64 yards on 11 carries in the game, and caught 2 passes for 18 yards.

During the 2010 season opener against the Philadelphia Eagles on September 12, 2010, Grant suffered a season-ending ankle injury and was placed on injured reserve after rushing for just 45 yards on eight carries. He underwent ankle surgery on September 21, 2010, but was expected to be fully healthy by the start of the 2011 season. The Packers would go on to win the Super Bowl that season against the Pittsburgh Steelers. During the playoffs and Super Bowl, rookie running back James Starks emerged as a new rushing threat for the Packers. In four playoff games, Starks rushed for 315 yards and a touchdown.

Grant returned to the Packers healthy after his ankle surgery in time for the 2011 season. After Starks' success in the playoffs, the Packers chose to use both running backs equally throughout the year. Grant would go on to run for 559 yards and 2 touchdowns in 2011. The Packers went 15–1 during the regular season and made the playoffs as the top-seeded team in the NFC; however, they lost in the first round of the playoffs to the New York Giants. Grant became a free agent at the expiration of his contract at the end of the season.

=== Washington Redskins ===
After a workout with the Chicago Bears, Grant signed with the Washington Redskins on September 25, 2012, a few weeks into the season after Roy Helu was placed on injured reserve. He was released just a month later on October 23. With the Redskins, Grant had just one rushing attempt for five yards and no receptions.

=== Green Bay Packers (second stint) ===
On December 5, 2012, Grant re-signed with the Packers following a season-ending knee injury to James Starks. Grant was back in uniform with the Packers the following week for their home game against the Detroit Lions. Upon his return to the Packers, Grant rushed for 132 yards on 32 carries for a 4.1 yard average during the regular season. He added two rushing touchdowns and one reception for 34 yards. At the end of the season he became a free agent. Although at least one team expressed interest, Grant ended up never signing with another team and retired from the NFL.

=== Career statistics ===
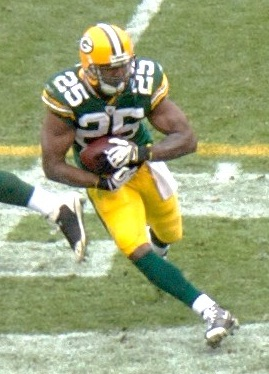
Grant taking a handoff during a game against the Atlanta Falcons on October 5, 2008.

Regular season

Year	Team	Games		Rushing					Receiving				
Year	Team	G	GS	Att	Yds	Avg	TD	Lg	Rec	Yds	Avg	TD	Lg
2006	NYG	0	0	0	0	0	0	0	0	0	0	0	0
2007	GNB	15	7	188	956	5.1	8	66	30	145	4.8	0	21
2008	GNB	16	14	312	1,203	3.9	4	57	18	116	6.4	1	17
2009	GNB	16	16	282	1,253	4.4	11	62	25	197	7.9	0	27
2010	GNB	1	1	8	45	5.6	0	18	0	0	0	0	0
2011	GNB	15	14	134	559	4.2	2	47	19	268	14.1	1	80
2012	WAS/GNB	5	1	32	132	4.1	2	18	1	34	34	0	34
Total		68	53	956	4,148	4.3	27	66	93	760	8.2	2	80
Source: National Football League

Playoffs

Year	Team	Games		Rushing					Receiving				
Year	Team	G	GS	Att	Yds	Avg	TD	Lg	Rec	Yds	Avg	TD	Lg
2007	GNB	2	2	40	230	5.8	3	43	3	3	1	0	11
2009	GNB	1	1	11	64	5.8	0	20	2	18	9.0	0	9
2011	GNB	1	1	8	33	4.1	0	19	3	17	5.7	0	10
2012	GNB	2	0	7	7	1.0	0	7	1	16	16.0	0	16
Total		6	4	66	334	5.1	3	43	9	54	6.0	0	16
Source: Pro-Football-Reference

== Personal life ==
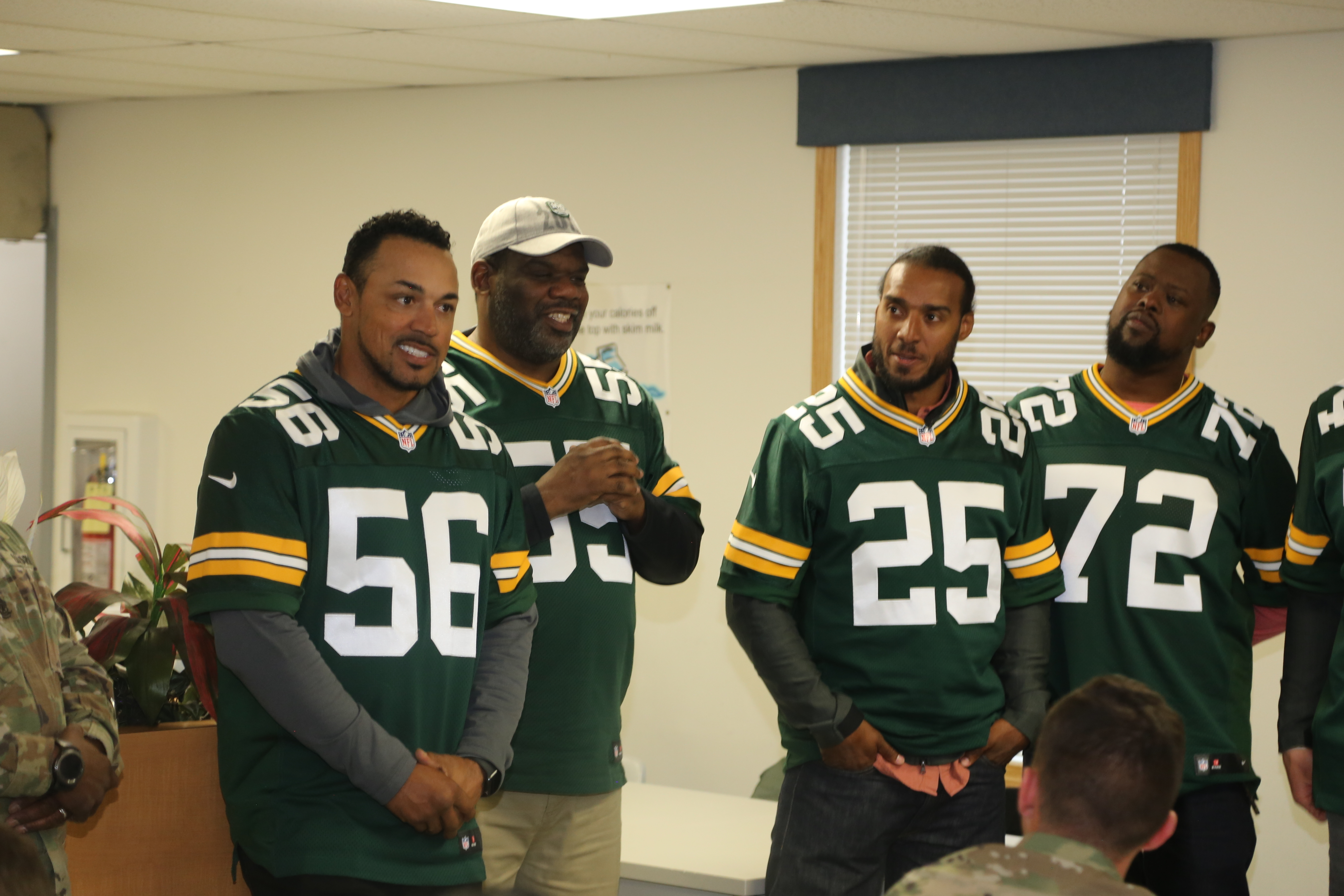
Grant (third from the left), with fellow Packers' alumni visiting with troops at Fort McCoy in 2019.

After his NFL career, Grant opened a cafe in Brooklyn, New York, called AP Coffee. Grant has also taken part in Packers alumni activities, including visiting troops at Fort McCoy in 2019 during the 14th annual Packers Tailgate Tour.
