= Shane Walton =

American football player (born 1979)

No. 38
- Position: Safety

Personal information
- Born: October 9, 1979 (age 47); San Diego, California, U.S.
- Listed height: 5 ft 11 in (1.80 m)
- Listed weight: 195 lb (88 kg)

Career information
- High school: The Bishop's School (San Diego)
- College: Notre Dame
- NFL draft: 2003: 5th round, 170th overall pick

Career history
- St. Louis Rams (2003); Pittsburgh Steelers (2004)*; Indianapolis Colts (2004)*; Calgary Stampeders (2005)
- * Offseason or practice squad member only

Awards and highlights
- Unanimous All-American (2002)
- Stats at Pro Football Reference

Shane Scott Walton (born October 9, 1979) is an American former professional football player who was a safety for one season with the St. Louis Rams of the National Football League (NFL) in 2003. He played college football and soccer at the University of Notre Dame, earning unanimous All-American honors with their Fighting Irish football team. The St. Louis Rams selected him in the fifth round of the 2003 NFL draft.

== Early life ==
Walton was born in San Diego, California. He attended The Bishop's School in La Jolla, California, and played for the school's soccer team. His team won under-16, under-17 and under-19 national titles while playing for the La Jolla Nomads.

== College career ==
Walton attended the University of Notre Dame, and played for the Notre Dame Fighting Irish football team from 1999 to 2002. He originally attended Notre Dame on a soccer scholarship and was named Big East Freshman of the Year after leading the soccer team in scoring in 1998. He walked on to the Irish football team as a sophomore, and was recognized as a unanimous first-team All-American as a senior in 2002. Walton finished the year with 68 tackles (46 solo), seven interceptions (two returned for touchdowns) and seven pass breakups.

== Professional career ==
Pre-draft measurables
Height	Weight	40-yard dash	10-yard split	20-yard split	20-yard shuttle	Three-cone drill	Vertical jump	Broad jump	Bench press	Wonderlic
5 ft 10 5/8 in (1.79 m)	184 lb (83 kg)	4.67 s	1.63 s	2.72 s	4.29 s	7.05 s	31 in (0.79 m)	9 ft 1 in (2.77 m)	11 reps	34
Broad jump from Tennessee Pro Day, all others from NFL Combine.

=== St. Louis Rams ===
The St. Louis Rams selected Walton in the fifth round (170th pick overall) of the 2003 NFL draft. He played in four games for the Rams in 2003 before being placed on injured reserve on October 9, 2003. He was waived on June 17, 2004.

=== Pittsburgh Steelers ===
Walton was signed by the Pittsburgh Steelers on June 28, 2004. He was waived on August 23, 2004.

=== Indianapolis Colts ===
Walton signed with the Indianapolis Colts on August 24, 2004. He was waived by the Colts on August 27, 2004.

== Life after football ==
Walton currently works as a behavioral analyst with F.I.T. and coaches at his alma mater, The Bishop's School. Walton heads the Shane Walton Foundation that funds tutors for children attempting to become eligible for private schools in San Diego. He continues playing adult soccer for the Nomads and other teams in the San Diego area.
