= Gerome Sapp =

American football player (born 1981)

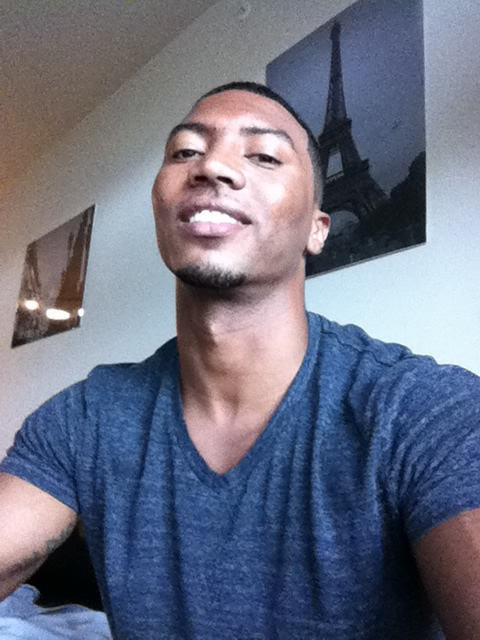
- Sapp in 2012

No. 27, 38, 42
- Position: Safety

Personal information
- Born: February 8, 1981 (age 45); Houston, Texas, U.S.
- Listed height: 6 ft 1 in (1.85 m)
- Listed weight: 216 lb (98 kg)

Career information
- High school: Lamar (Houston, Texas)
- College: Notre Dame
- NFL draft: 2003: 6th round, 182nd overall pick

Career history
- Baltimore Ravens (2003–2004); Indianapolis Colts (2004–2005); Baltimore Ravens (2006–2007)

Career NFL statistics
- Total tackles: 111
- Sacks: 2
- Fumble recoveries: 1
- Stats at Pro Football Reference

Gerome Daren Sapp (born February 8, 1981) is an American former professional football player who was a safety in the National Football League (NFL). He was selected by the Baltimore Ravens in the sixth round of the 2003 NFL draft. He played college football for the Notre Dame Fighting Irish.

== Early life ==
Sapp attended Lamar High School where he was an All-American and was in the USA Today for the 100 top football players in his class. He participated in the Texas vs. California High School Football All-Star game.

== College career ==
Sapp attended the University of Notre Dame, and finished his college football career with 155 tackles, 3 fumble recoveries and 5 INTs, adding 9 passes defended and 1 forced fumble.

== Professional career ==
Sapp was selected in the sixth round with the 182nd overall pick in the 2003 NFL draft by the Baltimore Ravens and would later play for the Indianapolis Colts before going back to Baltimore. Through his career, Sapp had 111 tackles.
