= Vontez Duff =

American football player (born 1982)

No. 34
- Position: Cornerback

Personal information
- Born: March 8, 1982 (age 44); Copperas Cove, Texas, U.S.
- Listed height: 5 ft 10 in (1.78 m)
- Listed weight: 193 lb (88 kg)

Career information
- High school: Copperas Cove
- College: Notre Dame
- NFL draft: 2004: 6th round, 170th overall pick

Career history
- Houston Texans (2004)*; Chicago Bears (2004)*; Indianapolis Colts (2004)*; Miami Dolphins (2004)*; Pittsburgh Steelers (2004–2005)*; Hamburg Sea Devils (2005); Las Vegas Gladiators (2007)
- * Offseason or practice squad member only

Awards and highlights
- Third-team All-American (2002)

Career AFL statistics
- Tackles: 3
- Pass deflections: 1
- Kick returns: 8
- Kick return yards: 114
- Stats at ArenaFan.com

Vontez Douglas Duff (born March 8, 1982) is an American former professional football cornerback who played in the National Football League (NFL). Born and raised in Copperas Cove, Texas, Duff attended Copperas Cove High School, where he was a standout running back. He attended the University of Notre Dame from 2000 to 2004 and played cornerback and also frequently returned kickoffs and punts. He was selected 170th overall by the Houston Texans in the sixth round of the 2004 NFL draft. He also played for the Chicago Bears. Duff would later go on to play for the Las Vegas Gladiators of the Arena Football League (AFL).
