= Pat Dillingham =

American football player (born 1983)

Profile
- Position: Quarterback

Personal information
- Born: August 16, 1983 (age 43); Portola Valley, California, U.S.
- Listed height: 6 ft 2 in (1.88 m)
- Listed weight: 205 lb (93 kg)

Career information
- High school: Saint Francis (Mountain View, California)
- College: Notre Dame (2001–2003)
- Stats at ESPN

Patrick Martin Dillingham (born August 16, 1983) is an American former football quarterback who played for the Notre Dame Fighting Irish.

== Early life ==
Dillingham attended St. Francis High School in Mountain View, California. As a senior, he threw for 1,505 yards with 11 touchdowns.

== College career ==
After not seeing any game action as a freshman in 2001, Pat played in seven games and started against Stanford during his Sophomore year. During the 2002 season, Dillingham completed 41 of 81 passes for 434 yards with one touchdown and seven interceptions. Dillingham came off the bench replacing an injured Carlyle Holiday to drive a comeback against Michigan State in the final minutes.

His most memorable play was during the Boston College game. Coming off an 8–0 start, Notre Dame was heavily favored in a home match up against an unranked opponent. Carlyle Holiday sustained a head injury, forcing Dillingham to take over in the first half. Tied at 7, Dillingham was leading a drive and made it to the red zone. On a scoring drive Dillingham threw a shovel pass to BC linebacker Josh Ott, who returned it 71 yards to score. This was ultimately the decisive touchdown as neither team scored in the second half.

In his Junior season, Dillingham only saw playing time in a single drive against Stanford.

Dillingham is currently the founder and CEO of Windy Hill Spirits.
