= Julius Jones (American football) =

American football player (born 1981)

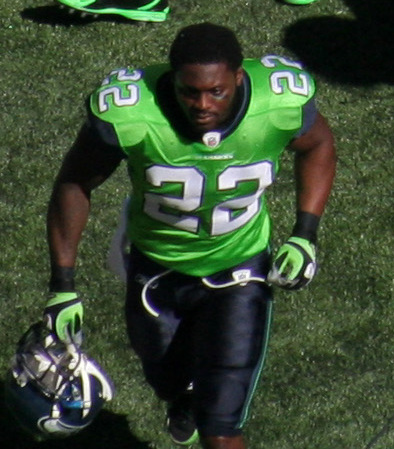
- Jones with the Seattle Seahawks in 2009

No. 21, 22
- Position: Running back

Personal information
- Born: August 14, 1981 (age 45); Big Stone Gap, Virginia, U.S.
- Listed height: 5 ft 10 in (1.78 m)
- Listed weight: 208 lb (94 kg)

Career information
- High school: Powell Valley (Big Stone Gap)
- College: Notre Dame (1999–2001, 2003)
- NFL draft: 2004: 2nd round, 43rd overall pick

Career history
- Dallas Cowboys (2004–2007); Seattle Seahawks (2008–2010); New Orleans Saints (2010)

Awards and highlights
- PFWA All-Rookie Team (2004); All-American (2003)

Career NFL statistics
- Rushing yards: 5,068
- Rushing average: 4
- Rushing touchdowns: 22
- Receptions: 150
- Receiving yards: 1,029
- Receiving touchdowns: 2
- Stats at Pro Football Reference

Julius Andre Maurice Jones (born August 14, 1981) is an American former professional football player who was a running back in the National Football League (NFL). He played college football for the Notre Dame Fighting Irish. Jones was selected by the Dallas Cowboys in the second round of the 2004 NFL draft. He also played in the NFL for the Seattle Seahawks and the New Orleans Saints.

== Early life ==
Jones was born in Big Stone Gap, Virginia. His mother, Betty, worked the graveyard shift in a Virginia coal mine for nearly 20 years while raising seven children, including his older brother Thomas. While in Appalachia, Virginia, his father encouraged the children to learn five new words per day and made them read the front page of the newspaper before they could read the sports section. Jones credits his parents with instilling the ambition and strong work ethic that he is known for in professional football.

Jones attended Powell Valley High School, where he was a letterman in football, basketball, and track. In football, as a senior he registered 2,564 yards and 36 touchdowns, earning honorable-mention USA Today All-American honors.

Jones contributed to his school winning 28 straight games and the Virginia Group A-Division II state title in 1997 and 1998 while being named the Virginia Group A Offensive Player of the Year in both years. He finished his high school career with 614 carries for 5,803 yards and 86 touchdowns. Jones also played safety and had 10 career interceptions.

== College career ==
Jones played college football at Notre Dame from 1999 to 2001 and 2003. As a freshman, he was a backup, playing mainly on special teams, while leading the team in both kickoff and punt return yardage, he also recorded 146-rushing yards and one touchdown against Navy. As a sophomore, he was a part of a three-back rotation that included Tony Fisher and Terrance Howard, which limited him to only three 100 rushing yard games. In 2002, Jones was suspended from the team because of academic reasons.

In 2003, although Jones began the season as a backup to Ryan Grant, he became the starter after the fifth game when he set a single-game school record for rushing yards (262) against the University of Pittsburgh. He had three 200-yard rushing performances, which is another school record, and one of the best single seasons ever by an Irish running back. Jones posted 229 carries for 1,268 yards (tied for the fourth-most in school history) and 10 touchdowns. He finished his college career as one of only four running backs in school history to rush for over 3,000 yards. Jones also set school records for kickoff return yards (1,678), combined kick return yards (2,104) and all-purpose yards (5,372).

== Professional career ==
Pre-draft measurables
Height	Weight	Arm length	Hand span	40-yard dash	10-yard split	20-yard split	20-yard shuttle	Three-cone drill	Vertical jump	Broad jump
5 ft 9 3/4 in (1.77 m)	217 lb (98 kg)	31 1/8 in (0.79 m)	9 1/4 in (0.23 m)	4.50 s	1.55 s	2.64 s	4.12 s	6.97 s	37.5 in (0.95 m)	10 ft 1 in (3.07 m)
All values from Pro Day

=== Dallas Cowboys ===
==== 2004 ====
After the NFL's All-Time leading rusher Emmitt Smith departed to the Arizona Cardinals, the Dallas Cowboys were looking to fix a disappointing running attack led by Troy Hambrick, with the selection of a potential franchise running back. In the 2004 NFL draft they found themselves with the opportunity to draft Steven Jackson, the highest-ranked running back, that fell because of concerns over a knee injury. Instead, the team felt they could select a comparable running back later in the draft and chose to trade their first-round pick to the Buffalo Bills (who used it to select J.P. Losman) for a future 2005 first-round pick who the Cowboys would later use on defensive end Marcus Spears. Jones was the back selected by the team in the second round (43rd overall) of the 2004 NFL draft. At the start of the season, already with a bruised rib, Jones fractured his scapula bone in a win versus the Cleveland Browns early in week two and the team was forced to depend on veteran free agent acquisition Eddie George during his absence.

Jones was later healthy enough to play midway through the season and despite in a losing effort, he gained 80 yards on a stingy Baltimore Ravens defense led by Pro Bowl linebacker Ray Lewis. A week later, on a nationally televised Thanksgiving stage against his older brother Thomas and the Chicago Bears, Julius won "player of the game" honors when he rushed for 150 yards and two touchdowns. As a result, Jones was the second Dallas Cowboy chosen for FOX's annual "Galloping Gobbler" trophy awarded every Thanksgiving Day. This honor was formerly bestowed upon running back Emmitt Smith in 2002 and later awarded to quarterback Tony Romo in 2006. As the season came to a close, Jones looked very impressive as he rushed for over 800 yards in the 8 remaining regular-season games. The future looked promising and it appeared as if the team had found their successor to Smith. Jones was one of the few bright spots in a dismal 6–10 season.

==== 2005 ====
Jones made a bold and confident goal of reaching 1,700 yards and 20 touchdowns. Against the Philadelphia Eagles in week 5, Julius rushed for 72 yards in the first half but suffered a high ankle sprain that bothered him the entire season and was forced to sit out for 3 games. For the second straight year, Jones was considered to be injury-prone and unable to carry the load of a franchise back. Rookie running back Marion Barber III turned in several strong performances in Julius' absence creating a running back controversy. Against the Detroit Lions Jones had rushed for 92 yards, but on 1st and goal from the 1-yard line, he was stopped 3 consecutive times. Later against the Carolina Panthers, Jones once again demonstrated his playmaking ability when rushed for two touchdowns and 194 yards. Former Cowboys quarterback and now Fox Network commentator Troy Aikman, commented on Jones' speed burst and agility, something he had not seen since Julius' rookie season in 2004. The Cowboys finished the season with an uninspiring loss the next week to the St. Louis Rams at Texas Stadium. At a record of 9–7, Dallas missed the playoffs for the 2nd consecutive year and as if to signify the entire season, Jones came just 7 yards short of his first 1,000-yard season.

==== 2006 ====
Jones' only goal this time was to stay healthy for a full season. After a strong start in which he gained 494 yards over the first five games, Jones saw his playing time decrease near the goal line and in the 4th quarter to Barber. Bill Parcells stated he wanted to keep both running backs fresh and used a "dual-back" system with Jones as the starter and Barber as the finisher. In week 14, versus the New Orleans Saints, Jones had the longest rush from scrimmage in his career with a 77-yard touchdown run on his first carry of the game. Jones also finally surpassed the 1,000-yard mark to become the first Cowboys back to do so since Emmitt Smith in 2001 and rushed for 112 yards in the Wildcard playoff game against the Seattle Seahawks. With the departure of Bill Parcells and the trade of his brother Thomas Jones to the New York Jets, rumors were rampant about the possible trade of Julius in the off-season as well. Cowboys owner Jerry Jones quickly dispelled any rumors stating "I don't see that happening" and was happy with the current rotation of Dallas running backs.

==== 2007 ====
Entering the final year of his contract and with a new coach Wade Phillips now in the fold, Julius had high hopes for the 2007 season. Jones stated that perhaps he listened to former head coach Bill Parcells more than he should have, rather than relying on his own instincts. During off-season workouts, with the numerous trade talks and strong public support for Barber to start, Julius chose to work out privately in Arizona away from the distractions in Dallas. Statistically, he had his lowest season as a professional with 164 carries for 588 yards and 2 touchdowns. Although Jones was the starting running back for the entire 16-game regular season, he had been visibly frustrated as the ratio of carries slowly started to tilt in Barber's favor. Despite openly defending Julius throughout the season, ultimately Wade Phillips decided to give Barber the start in the Divisional playoff loss to the New York Giants. He left the team ranked in eighth place on the all-time rushing list with 3,484 yards on 885 carries.

=== Seattle Seahawks ===
==== 2008 ====
On March 7, 2008, Jones agreed to a four-year deal with the Seattle Seahawks. While competing for the starting job throughout training camp, Mike Holmgren decided to give the start to running back Maurice Morris against the Buffalo Bills in week one but stated both backs will be used frequently. Morris was later sidelined with a knee injury and Jones ended the game with 13 carries for 45 yards. Against the San Francisco 49ers in week 2, Jones received his first start of the regular season and responded with 127 yards rushing and a touchdown in an overtime loss. In week 3 against the St. Louis Rams, Jones became the first Seahawks' running back to gain back-to-back 100-yard rushing games since 2005. He finished the day with 140 yards and a touchdown in a win against the Rams. Jones returned to Dallas in a Seahawks uniform on Thanksgiving Day and rushed for 37 yards on 11 carries in a loss to his former team. At the end of the 2008 regular season, Jones had 698 rushing yards (led the team) and 2 touchdowns, averaging 4.4 yards a carry.

==== 2009 ====
On September 14, 2009, which was also week 1 of the 2009 season, Jones rushed for 117 yards on 19 carries including a 62-yard touchdown run in a 28–0 win over the St. Louis Rams. It was also his first touchdown since week 3 of the 2008 season. Jones has picked up his first two receiving touchdowns of his professional career in back to back games against the San Francisco 49ers and the Chicago Bears. Jones ended the season with 663 yards (led the team) on 177 attempts with a 3.7 yards per carry average he also had 2 rushing touchdowns. He also caught 35 passes for 232 yards a 6.6 average and 2 touchdowns.

==== 2010 ====
On September 5, 2010, Julius Jones agreed to restructure his contract with the Seattle Seahawks in order to remain on the 53 man roster. On October 5, he was cut after the Seahawks traded a 2011 fourth-round selection (#122-Chris Hairston) and a 2012 conditional choice (#147-Tank Carder), to the Buffalo Bills in exchange for Marshawn Lynch.

=== New Orleans Saints ===
==== 2010 ====
On October 12, 2010, Julius Jones signed with the New Orleans Saints. He appeared in 10 games (2 starts), rushing for 193 yards on 48 carries. On January 8, 2011, Jones ran for two touchdowns against the Seattle Seahawks in a losing effort during the Wild Card Round of the NFL playoffs, the Saints lost 41–36. He became the first player to score a touchdown in a playoff game against the same team that cut him that same season. He wasn't re-signed after the playoffs.

== NFL career statistics ==
=== Regular season ===
Year	Team	Games		Rushing					Receiving					Fumbles	
Year	Team	GP	GS	Att	Yds	Avg	Lng	TD	Rec	Yds	Avg	Lng	TD	Fum	Lost
2004	DAL	8	7	197	819	4.2	53	7	17	108	6.4	37	0	3	3
2005	DAL	13	12	257	993	3.9	51	5	35	218	6.2	26	0	4	2
2006	DAL	16	16	267	1,084	4.1	77	4	8	142	15.8	39	0	1	1
2007	DAL	16	16	164	588	3.6	25	2	23	203	8.8	24	0	0	0
2008	SEA	15	10	158	698	4.4	33	2	14	66	4.7	17	0	4	2
2009	SEA	14	14	177	663	3.7	62	2	35	232	6.6	49	2	0	0
2010	SEA	2	0	12	30	2.5	6	0	0	0	0.0	0	0	0	0
2010	NO	10	2	48	193	4.0	54	0	17	59	3.5	13	0	1	1
Career		94	77	1,280	5,068	4.0	77	22	149	1,028	6.9	39	2	13	9

=== Postseason ===
Year	Team	Games		Rushing					Receiving					Fumbles	
Year	Team	GP	GS	Att	Yds	Avg	Lng	TD	Rec	Yds	Avg	Lng	TD	Fum	Lost
2006	DAL	1	1	22	112	5.1	35	0	2	0	0.0	2	0	0	0
2007	DAL	1	0	3	8	2.7	4	0	0	0	0.0	0	0	0	0
2010	NO	1	0	15	59	3.9	15	2	6	61	0.0	33	0	0	1
Career		94	77	1,280	5,068	4.0	77	22	8	61	7.6	33	0	0	1

== Personal life ==
Jones is the younger brother of running back Thomas Jones, and in 2006 they became the first brothers in the NFL to each rush for 1,000 yards in the same season. He was raised in Big Stone Gap, Virginia. He is the fourth amongst seven children.
