= Jeff Faine =

American football player (born 1981)

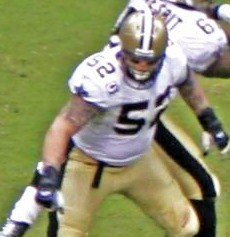
- Faine with the New Orleans Saints in 2007

No. 50, 52, 62
- Position: Center

Personal information
- Born: April 6, 1981 (age 45); Milwaukie, Oregon, U.S.
- Listed height: 6 ft 3 in (1.91 m)
- Listed weight: 291 lb (132 kg)

Career information
- High school: Seminole (Sanford, Florida)
- College: Notre Dame (1999–2002)
- NFL draft: 2003: 1st round, 21st overall pick

Career history
- Cleveland Browns (2003–2005); New Orleans Saints (2006–2007); Tampa Bay Buccaneers (2008–2011); Cincinnati Bengals (2012)

Awards and highlights
- First-team All-American (2002)

Career NFL statistics
- Games played: 118
- Games started: 118
- Fumble recoveries: 4
- Stats at Pro Football Reference

Jeffrey Kalei Faine (born April 6, 1981) is an American former professional football player who was a center in the National Football League (NFL). He was selected by the Cleveland Browns 21st overall in the 2003 NFL draft. He played college football for the Notre Dame Fighting Irish.

Faine also played for the New Orleans Saints, Tampa Bay Buccaneers, and Cincinnati Bengals.

== Early life ==
Faine is a 1999 graduate of Seminole High School in Sanford, Florida.

== Professional career ==
Faine was selected by the Cleveland Browns in the first round of the 2003 NFL draft. On April 29, 2006, the Cleveland Browns traded Faine and a second round pick (43rd overall) during the 2006 NFL draft to the New Orleans Saints and received a second round pick (34th overall). Faine was an alternate for the 2007 Pro Bowl behind center Olin Kreutz, but was not selected to the game. On February 29, 2008, Faine signed with the Tampa Bay Buccaneers. He was released by Tampa Bay on March 14, 2012. Faine was signed by the Cincinnati Bengals on August 29, 2012. He was released by the Bengals on December 6.
