= Brennan Curtin =

American football player (born 1980)

Profile
- Position: Offensive tackle

Personal information
- Born: June 30, 1980 (age 46); Daytona Beach, Florida, U.S.
- Listed height: 6 ft 9 in (2.06 m)
- Listed weight: 335 lb (152 kg)

Career information
- College: Notre Dame
- NFL draft: 2003: 6 / Pick 212th round

Career history
- 2003–2004: Green Bay Packers*
- 2005: New England Patriots*
- * Offseason or practice squad member only

Brennan Curtin (born June 30, 1980) is an American former professional football offensive tackle. He played college football for the Notre Dame Fighting Irish. He was selected by the Green Bay Packers in the sixth round of the 2003 NFL draft. He suffered what would be a career ending knee injury against the New Orleans Saints in the preseason of 2004. After a brief stint on the New England Patriots practice roster in 2006 he retired. He is the tallest player in the history of the Green Bay Packers organization.
