= Mike Goolsby =

American football player (born 1982)

No. 51
- Position: Linebacker

Personal information
- Born: May 10, 1982 (age 44); Joliet, Illinois, U.S.
- Listed height: 6 ft 4 in (1.93 m)
- Listed weight: 242 lb (110 kg)

Career information
- High school: Joliet Catholic Academy
- College: Notre Dame (2000–2004)
- NFL draft: 2005: undrafted

Career history
- Dallas Cowboys (2005)*; St. Louis Rams (2005)
- * Offseason or practice squad member only
- Stats at Pro Football Reference

Michael Richard Goolsby (born September 10, 1982) is an American former professional football player who was a linebacker for two games with the St. Louis Rams of the National Football League (NFL) in 2005. He played college football for the Notre Dame Fighting Irish.

== Early life ==
Goolsby attended and played high school football at Joliet Catholic Academy in Joliet, Illinois, where he was a four-year letterman as a linebacker and tight end. Goolsby was a three-year varsity starter. During his senior season, in 1999, Goolsby was named a consensus All-American after being named to the Reebok, Parade and USA Today AA teams. In his first three seasons he produced 210 tackles, nine sacks, nine tackles for loss, six forced fumbles, four fumble recoveries, and three interceptions. In 1999 Joliet Catholic Academy posted a record of 14–0 resulting in an eighth football state championship. While in high school Goolsby was timed at 10.8 in the 100 meters and 23.2 in the 200 meters.

Goolsby also earned eight letters in other sports, including three in basketball, three in track and field.

== College career ==
In 2000, Goolsby was one of three true freshman at the University of Notre Dame to earn a monogram. The following season, he was a fixture on all phases of special teams for the Irish.

In 2002, Goolsby started all 13 games as an inside linebacker. For the season, he made 75 tackles (48 solos) to rank third on the team in total tackles. He led the team in tackles for loss with 13 (48 yards) and had four quarterback sacks for 21 yards. He also forced a fumble and intercepted a pass, in addition to breaking up three passes. In his first career start, he led the team in tackles against Maryland with a then career-high eight tackles (two for losses, including his first career sack). In his second game as a starter Goolsby led the Irish in tackles versus Purdue with a career-high 11 tackles (including three tackles for loss), forced a fumble and broke up two passes. Following the regular season Goolsby was one of the country's leaders in tackles for loss. While playing in the 2003 Gator Bowl, he suffered a broken clavicle.

Goolsby missed the entire 2003 while healing from a torn labrum and a second consecutive broken clavicle.

Prior to his 2004 senior season, Goolsby was named to the Pre-Season Butkus Award watch list. He wound up leading the Irish in tackles with 97 and was named the Walter Camp Defensive Player of the Week after Notre Dame defeated Tennessee on the road. Goolsby recorded a season-high 14 tackles (7 solo) and added one sack to lead the Fighting Irish defensive unit. However, it was Goolsby's 26-yard interception return for a touchdown in the third quarter that gave Notre Dame (6–3) the lead for good.

=== Pre-draft ===
Following his 2004 campaign Goolsby was selected to play in the inaugural Senior Bowl, but after undergoing an emergency appendectomy he chose not to attend.

Scouting Report:

At the NFL Scouting Combine Goolsby measured in at 6-foot-3 and 249 pounds.

== Professional career ==
Goolsby went undrafted and signed with the Dallas Cowboys. Goolsby was the second highest paid undrafted free agent following the 2005 NFL draft.
