= Derek Curry =

American football player (born 1981)

Derek Christopher (DC) Curry (born in Houston, Texas) is a former American football linebacker. He was a nationally recruited high school football and baseball player. He entered the National Football League by signing to the Miami Dolphins and then the Cincinnati Bengals. He played college football at Notre Dame where he was a Team Captain and an honorable mention All-American middle linebacker. In 2004 he had 65 tackles. He graduated from Notre Dame with a degree in Management Information System and Theology.
