= Courtney Watson (American football) =

American football player (born 1980)

No. 55
- Position: Linebacker

Personal information
- Born: September 18, 1980 (age 46); Sarasota, Florida, U.S.
- Listed height: 6 ft 1 in (1.85 m)
- Listed weight: 246 lb (112 kg)

Career information
- High school: Riverview (Sarasota)
- College: Notre Dame
- NFL draft: 2004: 2nd round, 60th overall pick

Career history
- New Orleans Saints (2004–2005); Buffalo Bills (2006)*; Houston Texans (2006)*
- * Offseason or practice squad member only

Awards and highlights
- Second-team All-American (2002)

Career NFL statistics
- Tackles: 94
- Sacks: 3
- Passes defended: 4
- Stats at Pro Football Reference

Courtney Watson (born September 18, 1980) is an American former professional football player who was a linebacker for two seasons with the New Orleans Saints of the National Football League (NFL). He played college football for the Notre Dame Fighting Irish and was selected by the Saints in the second round of the 2004 NFL draft.

== Early life ==
Courtney Watson played high school football at Riverview High School in Sarasota. Watson played wide receiver as a freshman and sophomore, before switching to running back in his junior season. In his first year at the position, he rushed for more than 1,100 yards, earning All-League and All-Sarasota honors, while also being awarded team Most Valuable Player. As a senior, Watson rushed for 1,220 yards on 133 carries (9.2 yards per carry) and scored 15 touchdowns, while also handling kickoff and punt return duties and serving as a team captain. At the end of the season, he received All-League and All-Sarasota honors, he was named team MVP for a second straight year and he was selected to play in the Florida Shrine Bowl. While at Riverview he also competed in basketball, captaining the team as a senior and twice earning All-League and All-Sarasota honors, and he was a member of the track and field team.

== College career ==
In 1999 Courtney Watson enrolled at the University of Notre Dame to play for head coach Bob Davie and the Fighting Irish. He was redshirted his freshman year while being converted into a linebacker. In 2000 Watson spent most of his time on special teams, while serving as a backup to All-American linebacker Anthony Denman. After Denman got drafted by the Jacksonville Jaguars in the 2001 NFL draft, Watson received the starting job for the 2001 season. In the season opener against Nebraska, in his first career start, he recorded 18 tackles and he was named MVP of the game. He ended the season second on the team in tackles (76) and tackles for loss (13). In 2002 Watson led the team in tackles (90) and he was tied for second on the team in tackles for loss (10) and interceptions (4). In his final season at Notre Dame, in 2003, he again led the team in tackles (117) and he was second on the team in tackles for loss (15).

== Professional career ==
Pre-draft measurables
| Height | Weight | Arm length | Hand span | 40-yard dash | 10-yard split | 20-yard split | 20-yard shuttle | Three-cone drill | Vertical jump | Broad jump | Bench press |
|---|---|---|---|---|---|---|---|---|---|---|---|
| 6 ft 1 3/8 in (1.86 m) | 237 lb (108 kg) | 31 1/2 in (0.80 m) | 9 1/4 in (0.23 m) | 4.51 s | 1.56 s | 2.62 s | 4.35 s | 7.32 s | 36.5 in (0.93 m) | 9 ft 6 in (2.90 m) | 22 reps |
All values from NFL Combine/Pro Day

Watson was selected in the second round of the 2004 NFL draft by the New Orleans Saints and he signed a five-year, $2.98 million contract with the team. In the season opener of the 2004 NFL season he recorded 11 tackles. He ended the season with 57 tackles and two sacks in twelve games (eight starts). In the 2005 NFL season he played in nine games, with six starts, recording 37 tackles and one sack. During the 2006 offseason, he was traded to the Miami Dolphins for linebacker Eddie Moore. However, this trade was rejected when Eddie Moore failed a physical for the Saints. On June 6, 2006, Watson was traded to the Buffalo Bills in exchange for TE Tim Euhus. On August 22, 2006, he was released by the Bills. He was picked up by the Houston Texans two days later. However, he was released by the team before the start of the season.
