= Carlyle Holiday =

American football player (born 1981)

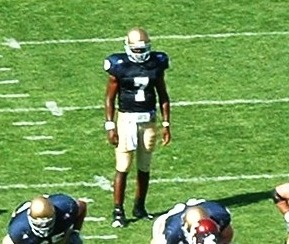
- Holiday playing for Notre Dame in 2003

No. 15, 18
- Position: Wide receiver

Personal information
- Born: October 4, 1981 (age 45); El Paso, Texas, U.S.
- Listed height: 6 ft 3 in (1.91 m)
- Listed weight: 217 lb (98 kg)

Career information
- High school: Roosevelt (TX)
- College: Notre Dame
- NFL draft: 2005: undrafted

Career history
- Arizona Cardinals (2005–2006); Green Bay Packers (2006–2007)

Career NFL statistics
- Receptions: 9
- Receiving yards: 126
- Stats at Pro Football Reference

Carlyle Javar Holiday (born October 4, 1981) is an American former professional football player who was a wide receiver in the National Football League (NFL). He played college football for the Notre Dame Fighting Irish.

== Early life ==
Carlyle attended Roosevelt High School in San Antonio, Texas. As a high school standout in football, basketball and baseball, he was named as the top high school scrambling quarterback in the nation. After a heavy bid from Nebraska, he eventually committed to the University of Notre Dame.

== College career ==
After redshirting as a freshman, Holiday went on to start 24 games at quarterback, leading the team to the 2003 Gator Bowl vs Philip Rivers and NC State in his final full season at quarterback. He finished with a starting record of 15–9. During his time at Notre Dame, he broke or tied several records which have been broken since then, including 100 yard rushing games in a season by a quarterback, most completions without an interception, and touchdown passes in a game. After the team started off 1-2 during his senior year, he was replaced by true freshman Quarterback Brady Quinn, who remained the starter moving forward. Holiday returned for a fifth year as a Wide Receiver and Punt Returner during Tyron Willingham's last season as Head Coach. Separate from football, he was selected by the Cincinnati Reds in the 44th round of the MLB amateur draft in 2002 having never played college baseball.

== Professional career ==
Holiday was signed as a free agent after the 2005 NFL Draft by the Arizona Cardinals. He made his first NFL start against the Chicago Bears on Monday Night Football in his second season with the Arizona Cardinals when Larry Fitzgerald was out with a sprained ankle. He received his second start the following week vs the Oakland Raiders. After being released by the Arizona Cardinals during week 13 in his second season, he was signed off waivers by the Green Bay Packers. His last four weeks of the 2006 season included career highs in catches, 5, and yards, 87, vs the Chicago Bears in the final game of the season, and catching Brett Favre's record breaking completion against the Detroit Lions, breaking Dan Marino's career completions mark, now held by Tom Brady. He was injured playing against the Philadelphia Eagles in the first game of the 2007 season, ending his year while being placed on injured reserve. In February 2008 he was released by the Green Bay Packers given knee injury concerns.

== Personal life ==
Carlyle currently works in professional development at management consulting firm McKinsey & Company in San Francisco.
