= 2005 USC vs. Notre Dame football game =

American college football game

The Bush Push
- Non-conference game
USC Trojans	Notre Dame Fighting Irish
(5–0)	(4–1)
34	31
Head coach: Pete Carroll	Head coach: Charlie Weis
AP / Coaches; 1 / 1	AP / Coaches; 9 / 9
	1	2	3	4	Total
USC	14	0	7	13	34
Notre Dame	7	14	0	10	31
- Date: October 15, 2005
- Season: 2005
- Stadium: Notre Dame Stadium
- Location: South Bend, Indiana, U.S.
- National anthem: Band of the Fighting Irish
- Halftime show: Band of the Fighting Irish
- Attendance: 80,795

United States TV coverage
- Network: NBC
- Announcers: Tom Hammond, Pat Haden and Lewis Johnson (sideline)

The 2005 USC vs. Notre Dame football game was a regular season game that took place on October 15, 2005, at Notre Dame Stadium. The game between perennial rivals USC and Notre Dame was played for the Jeweled Shillelagh. The game was preceded by much pre-game hype, including a visit by College GameDay. In what became known as the "Bush Push", the game ended with quarterback Matt Leinart being pushed by running back Reggie Bush into the end zone for the winning touchdown. His push was illegal assistance under the laws of the game but it was not called a foul by the officials.

On June 10, 2010, the NCAA retroactively declared Bush ineligible for the entire 2005 season and forced USC to vacate its victory. However, the loss still counts for Notre Dame.

== Background ==
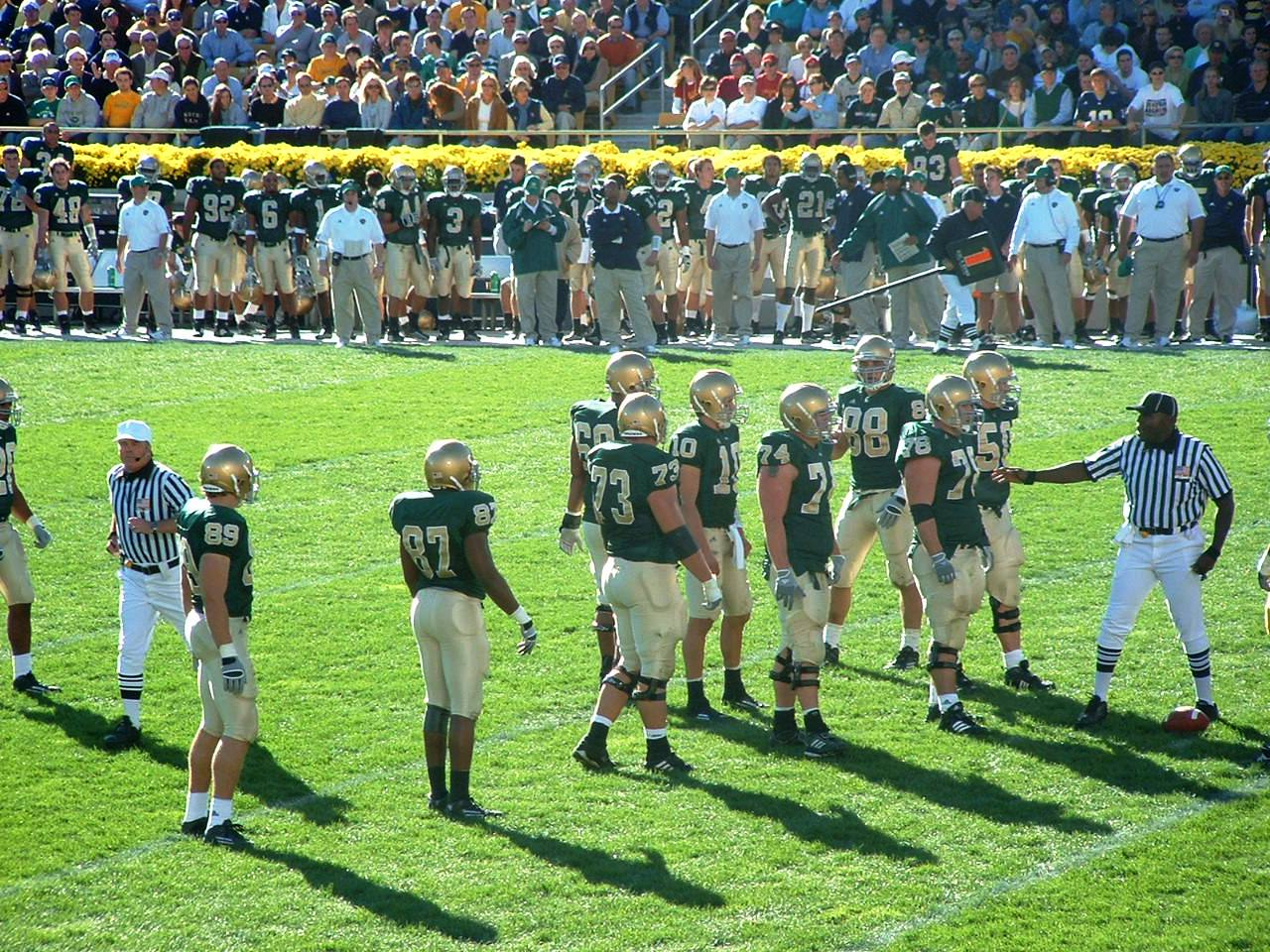
Notre Dame wearing their green jerseys during the game

USC came into the game with a 27-game winning streak, including three wins over Notre Dame by 31 points each. They were also defending national champions and were ranked first in the nation. Notre Dame came into the game ranked 9th in the nation, having won four road games, but on a three-game losing streak at home.

The game was much hyped prior to the start, including some expecting it to be a "Game of the Century". ESPN's College GameDay, which began in 1993 during the last Game of the Century, planned to be at the game. Finally, the Notre Dame pep rally, with officials expecting large crowds, was moved to the stadium and was broadcast nationally on ESPNEWS. For the rally, Weis asked several Notre Dame legends to speak; including Tim Brown, Joe Montana and Daniel "Rudy" Ruettiger.

In the pre-game warm-ups, the Irish wore their regular blue jerseys, however, despite Weis' statement that no one should "count on" the use of green jerseys for the game, the Irish came out for the game wearing green.

== The game ==
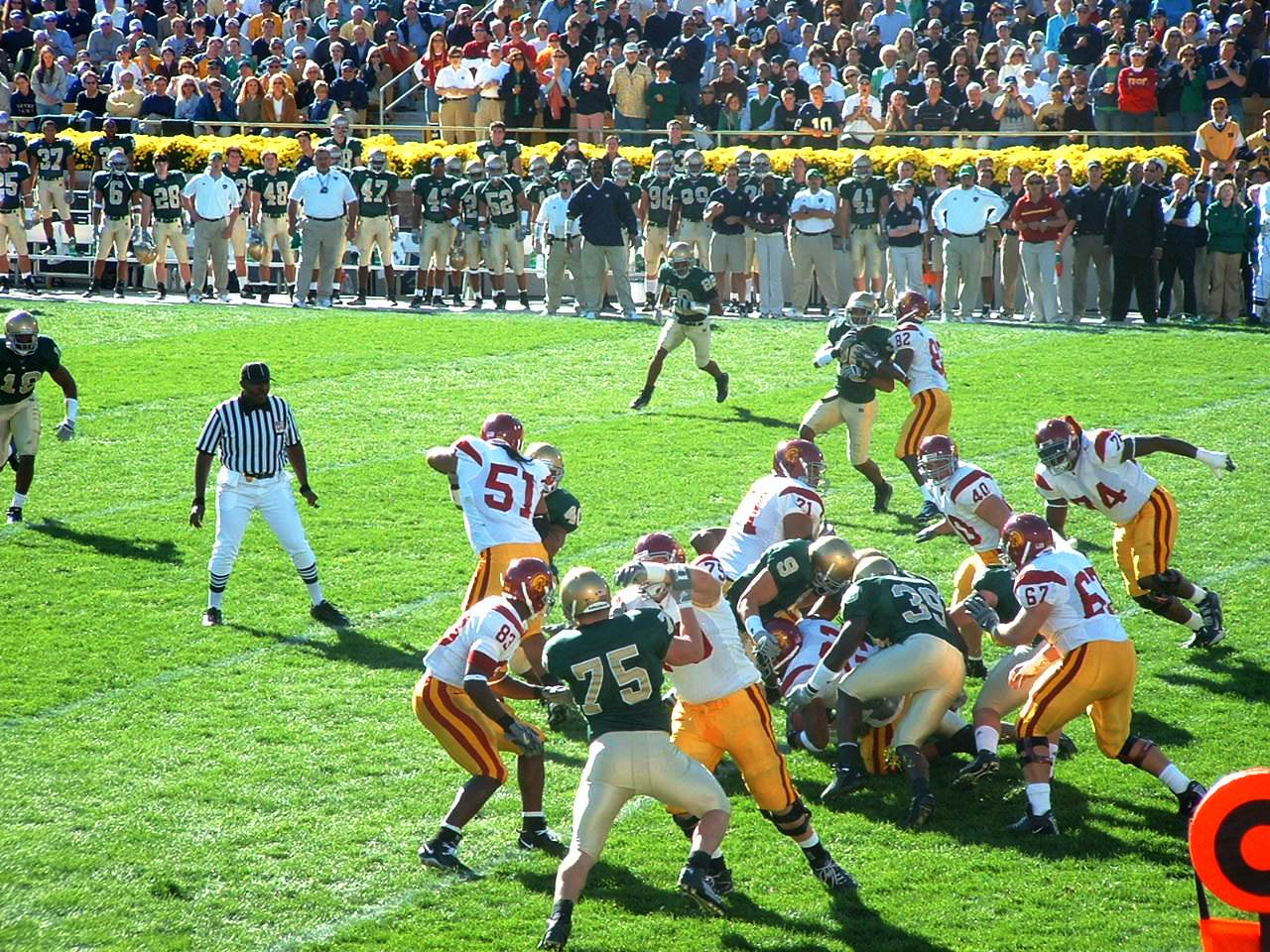
The two teams during the game

The first quarter began with neither team moving the ball on their first possession. On Notre Dame's second possession, a Brady Quinn pass was intercepted by Keith Rivers which led to a Reggie Bush 36-yard rushing touchdown during which he hurdled would-be tackler Ambrose Wooden. The next Irish drive, which included a fourth down conversion on the Irish half of the field and the help of 28 yards in penalties, culminated in a 16-yard rushing touchdown by Travis Thomas to tie the game at 7. Less than a minute later, after a 52-yard pass from Leinart to Dominique Byrd that brought the Trojans to the Irish goal-line, LenDale White ran 3 yards for their second touchdown of the day. With both teams punting on their next drives, the first quarter ended with the Trojans leading 14–7.

In the second quarter, Quinn led the Irish on a 72-yard drive that culminated in his 32-yard touchdown pass to Jeff Samardzija to tie the game at 14. The Trojans were forced to punt on their next possession and Tom Zbikowski returned the ball 59 yards for a touchdown to give the Irish their first lead of the game. Leinart led the Trojans down the field on a 69-yard drive before being intercepted in the end zone by Irish defender Chinedum Ndukwe to end the drive. Neither team scored for the rest of the half, and the Irish led at halftime 21–14.

As the second half began, the Trojans drove 53-yards before Leinart was intercepted again, this time by Mike Richardson on the Irish half of the field. Notre Dame was unable to move the ball and punted to Bush who returned it 20 yards. Then just two plays later he sprinted 45 yards for a touchdown to tie the game at 21. On the next Irish drive, Brady Quinn completed a pass to tight end Anthony Fasano who ran it well into USC territory but Darnell Bing punched the ball loose at the Trojans' 27 yard line and Keith Rivers recovered it at the 6 to end the drive. Neither team scored again in the quarter and it ended with the game tied at 21–21.

The fourth quarter scoring began with a 32-yard field goal by D.J. Fitzpatrick to give the Irish the lead of 24–21. USC didn't answer, but on Notre Dame's next drive, Fitzpatrick missed a 34-yard field goal that would have extended the lead. With five minutes left in the game, Bush finished a Leinart-led 80-yard drive, with a 9-yard touchdown to give the Trojans a 28–24 lead. On the Irish drive, Quinn completed his four passes for 53 yards, Darius Walker ran for 29 yards, and Quinn ran 5 yards for a touchdown, giving the Irish a 31–28 lead with just over two minutes remaining in the game. On the Trojans' drive, after an incomplete pass, Leinart was sacked for a loss of 10 yards with 1:44 left in the game. Leinart was able to complete an 11-yard pass to Bush to give the Trojans a fourth down and nine situation on their own 26-yard line with only 1:32 left in the game. Leinart signaled to Dwayne Jarrett at the line of scrimmage that he would be single covered. He threw a short fade to Jarrett down the sideline just over the outstretched arms of Irish cornerback Ambrose Wooden, and Jarrett slipped away to race all the way to the Irish 13-yard line. After two rushes by Bush brought the Trojans to the 2-yard line, Leinart scrambled toward the sideline, where linebacker Corey Mays caused Leinart to fumble the ball out of bounds. Replays of the play appear to show the ball was fumbled out of bounds at the 4 yard line. Replays also showed Brennan Carroll, son of head coach Pete Carroll and a Graduate Assistant at the time, attempting to call timeout despite the Trojans having none. Although the time was stopped on field with seven seconds remaining, the stadium timekeeper let the scoreboard clock run. When the time ran out, the Notre Dame student section began to rush the field. After a brief delay to clear the field, play resumed with seven seconds shown on the clock. The officials placed the ball at the 1 yard line.

On the last play of the game for second and goal, sometimes called the "Bush Push" and named one of the greatest college football plays ever, Carroll signaled to Leinart to spike the ball and stop the game. As it would turn out, the gesture was merely a decoy. Carroll had really told Leinart to go for the touchdown and not to tie the game and cause overtime. Leinart, opting to keep the ball on the advice of Bush, tried to sneak into the end zone. When he was stopped by a large group of Irish players, Bush pushed him into the end zone for the winning score. After an excessive celebration penalty, a missed extra point, and a final, unsuccessful last-ditch attempt at a kickoff return for touchdown by Notre Dame with only 3 seconds left, the game ended with the Trojans winning 34–31.

== The "Bush Push" play ==
The Bush Push was technically an illegal play. In Section 3, Article 2b of the NCAA rule book states that, "[t]he runner shall not grasp a teammate; and no other player of his team shall grasp, push, lift or charge into him to assist him in forward progress." If the penalty had been called, the push would have resulted in a five-yard penalty and another play. However, when asked about the play, Weis expressed his hope that his running back would do the same in that situation.

USC coach Pete Carroll declined the use of instant replay for this game. Under 2005 NCAA rules, schools had to agree to use instant replay in non-conference games. The next season, the NCAA changed the rule and made it mandatory for all Division I-A (now Football Bowl Subdivision) games.

The game was officiated by a crew from the Pacific-10. Since the mid-1990s, when split officiating crews were outlawed, Pac-10/Pac-12 officials call games in South Bend, while a crew from the Atlantic Coast Conference (previously the Big Ten) officiates meetings at Los Angeles.

=== The call of the play ===
Lines are set. Leinart sneaks towards the goal line...HE'S IN THE END ZONE! TOUCHDOWN USC!! WITH THREE SECONDS TO GO! The Trojans have scored! With three seconds left, he did not spike it! He went into the end zone! Matt Leinart has scored, and the Trojans will win the ball game! – Peter Arbogast on KMPC AM-1540 the Trojans Radio Network.

"USC will get one more play. Leinart gonna try to sneak it ahead. Did he get it?.....TOUCHDOWN SC!" – Tom Hammond and Pat Haden on NBC.

== The aftermath ==
The game was said to live up to its hype and was the most watched regular season college football game in nine years with 10.1 million viewers watching. The Trojans kept their winning streaks alive and remained first in both national rankings with a 6–0 record. The Irish, having won four games in a row at Notre Dame Stadium and having a 4–2 record for the season, remained 9th in the AP Poll and dropped only three places to 12th in the Coaches Poll. USC would go on to win the rest of its regular season games, and play in the 2006 Rose Bowl to defend their national championship. However, they would fall to Texas. The Irish also won the rest of their regular season games and accepted a berth in the 2006 Fiesta Bowl, where they were beaten by Ohio State.

USC continued to dominate the rivalry, winning the next four meetings to make it eight in a row versus the Irish. Notre Dame finally ended that losing streak in 2010 with a 20–16 victory in Los Angeles; USC's recent dominance, coupled with Notre Dame's earlier 13-game unbeaten streak over USC (1983–95) illustrates the cyclical nature of the Notre Dame–USC football rivalry over the long term.

== See also ==
- Notre Dame–USC football rivalry
