= 2005 Notre Dame Fighting Irish football team =

American college football season

2005 Notre Dame Fighting Irish football

Fiesta Bowl, L 20–34 vs. Ohio State
- Conference: Independent

Ranking
- Coaches: No. 11
- AP: No. 9
- Record: 9–3
- Head coach: Charlie Weis (1st season)
- Offensive coordinator: Michael Haywood (1st season)
- Offensive scheme: Pro-style
- Defensive coordinator: Rick Minter (3rd season)
- Base defense: Multiple 4–3
- MVPs: Brady Quinn; Jeff Samardzija
- Captains: Brady Quinn; Brandon Hoyte
- Home stadium: Notre Dame Stadium

2005 NCAA Division I-A independents football records
	Conf.			Overall
Team	W		L	W		L
No. 9 Notre Dame %		–		9	–	3
Navy		–		8	–	4
Army		–		4	–	7
Temple		–		0	–	11
% – BCS at-large representative; Rankings from AP Poll

The 2005 Notre Dame Fighting Irish football team was an American football team that represented the University of Notre Dame as an independent during the 2005 NCAA Division I-A football season. In their first year under head coach Charlie Weis, the Irish compiled a 9–3 record, outscored opponents by a total of 440 to 294, and were ranked No. 9 in the final AP poll and No. 11 in the final Coaches Poll. They defeated No. 3 Michigan, lost to No. 1 USC, and concluded the season with a loss to No. 4 Ohio State in the Fiesta Bowl Weis was hired in December 2004 after the firing of Tyrone Willingham.

The team featured a passing game that tallied an average of 330.3 passing yards per game. Quarterback Brady Quinn won the Sammy Baugh Trophy and set a school record with 3,919 passing yards. Wide receiver Jeff Samardzija led the team with 77 receptions for 1,249 yards and was a consensus first-team selection on the 2005 All-America college football team. The ground game was led by running back Darius Walker who tallied 1,196 rushing yards.

The team played its home games at Notre Dame Stadium in Notre Dame, Indiana.

== Schedule ==
Date	Time	Opponent	Rank	Site	TV	Result	Attendance
September 3	8:00 p.m.	at No. 23 Pittsburgh		Heinz Field; Pittsburgh, PA (rivalry)	ABC	W 42–21	66,451
September 10	12:00 p.m.	at No. 3 Michigan	No. 20	Michigan Stadium; Ann Arbor, MI (rivalry)	ABC	W 17–10	111,386
September 17	3:30 p.m.	Michigan State	No. 10	Notre Dame Stadium; Notre Dame, IN (rivalry)	NBC	L 41–44 ^{OT}	80,795
September 24	3:30 p.m.	at Washington	No. 16	Husky Stadium; Seattle, WA	ABC	W 36–17	71,473
October 1	7:45 p.m.	at No. 22 Purdue	No. 13	Ross–Ade Stadium; West Lafayette, IN (rivalry)	ESPN	W 49–28	65,491
October 15	3:30 p.m.	No. 1 USC	No. 9	Notre Dame Stadium; Notre Dame, IN (rivalry, College GameDay)	NBC	L 31–34	80,795
October 22	2:30 p.m.	BYU	No. 9	Notre Dame Stadium; Notre Dame, IN	NBC	W 49–23	80,795
November 5	2:30 p.m.	Tennessee	No. 8	Notre Dame Stadium; Notre Dame, IN	NBC	W 41–21	80,795
November 12	1:00 p.m.	Navy	No. 7	Notre Dame Stadium; Notre Dame, IN (rivalry)	NBC	W 42–21	80,795
November 19	2:30 p.m.	Syracuse	No. 6	Notre Dame Stadium; Notre Dame, IN	NBC	W 34–10	80,795
November 26	8:00 p.m.	at Stanford	No. 6	Stanford Stadium; Stanford, CA (rivalry)	ABC	W 38–31	56,057
January 2, 2006	4:30 p.m.	vs. No. 4 Ohio State	No. 5	Sun Devil Stadium; Tempe, AZ (Fiesta Bowl)	ABC	L 20–34	76,196
Rankings from AP Poll released prior to the game; All times are in Eastern time

== Preseason ==
=== Coaching changes ===
After finishing the 2004 season at 6–6, Notre Dame officials, in a controversial move, fired third-year head coach Tyrone Willingham. The Irish initially hoped to hire University of Utah head coach Urban Meyer, who had led the Utes to an undefeated season, as Meyer had been an assistant coach for the Irish for five years and had a clause in his contract stating he could leave Utah without penalty if Notre Dame offered him a job. When Meyer accepted the head coaching job at the University of Florida, Notre Dame hired Charlie Weis, the New England Patriots' offensive coordinator, making him the first Notre Dame alumnus to lead the team since 1963.

=== Roster changes ===
The Irish lost a number of players on defense including four former starting defensive backs, three players on the defensive line, including defensive end Justin Tuck, and two former starting linebackers, including honorable mention All-American Derek Curry, to graduation. On the offensive side of the ball the only key losses for the Irish were running back Ryan Grant and former quarterback and wide receiver Carlyle Holiday. The Irish returned ten starters on offense and four on defense.

=== Award candidates ===
Four players were named to the national awards watch lists in the pre-season:

- Anthony Fasano – John Mackey Award
- D. J. Fitzpatrick – Lou Groza Award
- Brandon Hoyte – Dick Butkus Award
- Brady Quinn – Maxwell Award

== Rankings ==
Ranking movements Legend: ██ Increase in ranking ██ Decrease in ranking RV = Received votes
	Week															
Poll	Pre	1	2	3	4	5	6	7	8	9	10	11	12	13	14	Final
AP	RV	20	10	16	13	12	9	9	9	8	7	6	6	7	5	9
Coaches	RV	23	12	18	14	12	9	12	10	9	7	7	6	7	6	11
Harris	Not released				13	11	8	11	10	9	7	6	5	7	5	Not released
BCS	Not released							16	15	14	11	9	8	8	6	Not released

== Game summaries ==
=== Pittsburgh ===
Notre Dame at #23 Pittsburgh

Team	1	2	3	4	Total
• Notre Dame	7	28	7	0	42
Pittsburgh	10	3	0	8	21

- Date: September 3
- Location: Heinz Field, Pittsburgh, PA
- Game start: 8:00 p.m. EST
- Elapsed time: 3:25
- Game attendance: 66,451
- Game weather: Clear; 73 °F (23 °C); wind 7 mph (11 km/h) NW
- Referee: Dennis Lipski
- Television network: ABC

Scoring summary
Q1	10:58	PITT	Lee 39 yard pass from Palko (Cummings kick)	PITT 7–0
Q1	8:19	ND	Walker 51 yard pass from Quinn (Fitzpatrick kick)	Tie 7–7
Q1	1:40	PITT	Cummings 49 yard field goal	PITT 10–7
Q2	13:07	ND	Walker 2 yard run (Fitzpatrick kick)	ND 14–10
Q2	6:59	ND	Powers-Neal 2 yard run (Fitzpatrick kick)	ND 21–10
Q2	6:03	ND	Samardzija 19 yard pass from Quinn (Fitzpatrick kick)	ND 28–10
Q2	4:20	PITT	Cummings 23 yard field goal	ND 28–13
Q2	1:39	ND	Powers-Neal 9 yard run (Fitzpatrick kick)	ND 35–13
Q3	7:59	ND	Powers-Neal 4 yard run (Fitzpatrick kick)	ND 42–13
Q4	12:55	PITT	Palko 4 yard run (Murphy run)	ND 42–21

The Irish's first game of the season came on the road against the No. 23 ranked Pittsburgh Panthers. The Panthers were led by their first-year head coach Dave Wannstedt and junior quarterback and two-year starter, Tyler Palko. At Notre Dame, the previous season, Palko became the first quarterback to throw five touchdown passes against the Irish in the Panthers 41–38 win. Palko started the scoring this year with a 39-yard touchdown pass to Greg Lee, however Brady Quinn and the Irish answered with a 51-yard touchdown pass to Darius Walker. The Panthers completed the first quarter scoring with a 49-yard field goal by Josh Cummings to take a 10–7 lead into the second quarter. In the second quarter, the Irish took control. The quarter began with a 2-yard touchdown run by Walker. Later, Rashon Powers-Neal scored on his own 2-yard run, and, after a fumble on the kickoff return, less than a minute later Quinn threw a 19-yard touchdown pass to Jeff Samardzija, the first touchdown catch of his career, to give the Irish a 28–10 lead. Cummings hit a 23-yard field goal to cut the Irish lead to 15, but late in the half Powers-Neal ran for a 9-yard touchdown, giving the Irish a 35–13 lead at halftime.

The second half saw much less scoring. In the third quarter, Powers-Neal ran for a 4-yard touchdown, the only score in the quarter, to give the Irish their final score. In the fourth quarter, Palko ran for his own 4-yard touchdown, and the two-point conversion was the final score of the game. The Irish won the game 42–21, and jumped to 23rd in the national rankings.

=== Michigan ===
#23 Notre Dame at #3 Michigan

Team	1	2	3	4	Total
• Notre Dame	7	7	0	3	17
Michigan	0	3	0	7	10

- Date: September 10
- Location: Michigan Stadium, Ann Arbor, MI
- Game start: 12:00 p.m. EST
- Elapsed time: 3:30
- Game attendance: 111,386
- Game weather: Sunny; 85 °F (29 °C); wind 10–15 mph (16–24 km/h) SE
- Referee: B. LeMonnier

Scoring summary
Q1	12:02	ND	McKnight 5 yard pass from Quinn (Fitzpatrick kick)	ND 7–0
Q2	14:04	MICH	Rivas 38 yard field goal	ND 7–3
Q2	4:24	ND	Samardzija 5 yard pass from Quinn (Fitzpatrick kick)	ND 14–3
Q4	14:11	ND	Fitzpatrick 43 yard field goal	ND 17–3
Q4	3:47	MICH	Manningham 25 yard pass from Henne (Rivas kick)	ND 17–10

The second game of the season came on the road against long-time rivals the Michigan Wolverines, led by coach Lloyd Carr and second year starting quarterback, Chad Henne. Michigan had moved up to 3rd in the nation from a pre-season ranking of 4th after a 16-point win against Northern Illinois. Coming into the season, Michigan had not lost a home game since 2002 with a streak of 16 games and hadn't lost a non-conference home game since 1998. Also, despite beating the Wolverines twice in the last three years including a 28–20 win over the then 7th ranked Wolverines in 2004, the Irish hadn't won at Michigan since 1993.

The Irish began the game with the ball, and marched down the field with a 76-yard drive that culminated in a 5-yard Brady Quinn touchdown pass to Rhema McKnight. Late in the quarter, key Wolverine running back Mike Hart was injured during a run, keeping him out for the rest of the game. In the second quarter, on Michigan's first drive past the 50-yard line, Garrett Rivas was able to hit a 38-yard field goal to make the score 7–3 in favor of the Irish. Later in the quarter, the Irish lost McKnight to what would later be revealed as a season-ending knee injury. Quinn and Walker, however, led the Irish on another long drive, culminating in a 5-yard touchdown pass to Jeff Samardzija to give the Irish a 14–3 lead at halftime.

The second half was filled with missed opportunities for the Wolverines. At the start of the third quarter, Henne and running back Kevin Grady led the Wolverines on a 69-yard drive, that was finally stopped on a Henne interception by safety Tom Zbikowski on the Irish 1-yard line. Most of the rest of the quarter consisted of short drives that were stopped early forcing each team to punt. In the Wolverines' final drive of the quarter, the Irish defense held them to their own 9-yard line, and forced a punt that was returned by Zbikowski to the Michigan 33-yard line. Although the Irish only advanced the ball 7-yards, at the beginning of the fourth quarter D. J. Fitzpatrick kicked a 43-yard field goal to give the Irish a 17–3 lead. On their next possession, a Walker fumble was recovered by the Wolverines on the Irish 18-yard line. After driving to the 5-yard line, the Wolverines couldn't convert a fourth down and turned the ball over to the Irish. On the Wolverines next possession, on another fourth down attempt near midfield, Henne completed a 54-yard pass to Jason Avant who was tackled at the Irish 1-yard line. On the next play, however, Henne fumbled the ball into the endzone and it was recovered by Chinedum Ndukwe for the Irish. On the Wolverines next possession, Henne threw a 26-yard touchdown pass to Mario Manningham to bring the score to 17–10. Michigan had one final possession with two minutes remaining, but failed, once again, to convert a fourth down, sealing the win for the Irish. With the win, Weis became the first Notre Dame coach since Knute Rockne to win his first two games on the road, and the Irish moved up to 12th in the nation.

=== Michigan State ===
	1	2	3	4	OT	Total
Spartans	14	10	14	0	6	44
#10 Irish	7	10	7	14	3	41

The Irish next had their home opener against the Michigan State Spartans, a rivalry game with the Megaphone Trophy given to the winner. The Spartans, this year's team led by coach John L. Smith and second year starting quarterback Drew Stanton, hoped to become only the second team to beat the Irish at Notre Dame for five consecutive games. Despite a win in 2004, the Irish had lost six of their last eight games against the Spartans.

The Spartans led for much of the game, at one point, late in the third quarter after Stanton threw a 65-yard pass for his third touchdown of the game, they had a 38–17 lead. The Irish, however, came back later in the quarter and tied the game at 38 during the fourth quarter, with three touchdown passes by Brady Quinn to give him a total of five for the game. During the overtime period, the Irish, with the ball first, missed three attempted passes by Quinn into the endzone, and settled for a field goal to give them a 41–38 lead. On the Spartans second play in overtime, Stanton, while running the option, pitched the ball to Jason Teague for a 19-yard touchdown to win the game. The Irish dropped to 18th and the Spartans entered the national rankings at 23rd after the week. After the game, apparently upset at not having the Megaphone Trophy to raise after the win, a small group of Spartans planted the Michigan State flag on the field. After the incident, a number of other occurrences of flag planting happened, leading to a banning of the practice by the Big Ten.

=== Washington ===
	1	2	3	4	Total
#16 Irish	3	9	7	17	36
Huskies	0	3	0	14	17

The Irish next went on the road to face the Washington Huskies, in a game dubbed the "Ty Bowl," because the Huskies were led by former Irish coach Ty Willingham. The Huskies came into the game never having beaten the Irish in five meetings including a 38–3 loss at Notre Dame in 2004.

On the first drive of the game, the Huskies easily moved forward on the Irish defense, however, were held without scoring when quarterback, Isaiah Stanback's pass to Craig Chambers was fumbled on the goal line and recovered by the Irish. The Irish didn't score on their first drive when the hold for a field goal attempt was botched. However, on their next drive the D. J. Fitzpatrick kicked a 25-yard field goal for the only score of the first quarter. In the second quarter, Evan Knudson tied the game on a 27-yard field goal. On the next drive, Darius Walker ran for a 17-yard touchdown, giving the Irish a 9–3 lead after a missed extra point. Fitzpatrick kicked another field goal of 39-yards to end scoring in the first half with the Irish leading 12–3.

After two Irish failed fourth down attempts, and a Huskies fumble, Rashon Powers-Neal ran for a 2-yard touchdown to give the Irish a 19–3 lead at the end of the third quarter. In the fourth quarter, Fitzpatrick kicked another field goal of 23-yards to extend the Irish lead to 19. Later in the quarter, Brady Quinn threw his only touchdown of the game with a 52-yard pass to Jeff Samardzija. Stanback led the Huskies for their first touchdown, culminating in a 1-yard run by Mark Palaita, however the Irish answered with an 11-yard touchdown by Travis Thomas for their final score of the game. With three minutes left in the game, Stanback was replaced with backup quarterback Johnny Durocher, who threw a 41-yard touchdown to Chambers, to give the final score of 36–17. With the win, the Irish moved up in the rankings to 14th in the nation.

=== Purdue ===
	1	2	3	4	Total
#13 Irish	7	21	7	14	49
#20 Boilermakers	0	0	14	14	28

The Irish next went on the road, for the fourth time in the season, to face the 20th ranked Purdue Boilermakers, led by 9th year head coach Joe Tiller, for the Shillelagh Trophy. Although the Irish led the all-time series against Purdue 49–25–2, the Boilermakers had won the two previous meetings and were hoping to come back after a double-overtime loss the previous week.

Although neither team was able to score on their opening drives, the Irish quickly got going on their second, and were led by Brady Quinn's passing and Darius Walker's rushes on a 90-yard drive that ended with a Rashon Powers-Neal 1-yard touchdown to give the Irish the lead. The Boilermakers, led by Brandon Kirsch to the Irish 2-yard line, failed to answer after a goal line fumble was recovered by the Irish. Quinn then led the Irish on a 98-yard drive, that lasted into the second quarter, and ended with another 1-yard touchdown run by Powers-Neal. The ensuing kickoff was returned by Dorien Bryant 66 yards to give the Boilermakers the ball on the Notre Dame 30-yard line, however, they were unable to advance it and didn't score due to a missed 43-yard field goal. Quinn took advantage and led the Irish on a 73-yard drive ending with his touchdown pass to Jeff Samardzija. With another 10-yard touchdown run by Walker later in the quarter, the Irish took a 28–0 lead at halftime.

In the second half, the Boilermakers finally scored after Kirsch passed for a total of 73 yards on an 85-yard drive that ended with his touchdown 18-yard touchdown pass to Bryant. The Irish answered on Quinn's second touchdown pass to Samardzija of 55 yards, however Kirsch cut the Irish lead once again to 21 after a 3-yard touchdown pass to Bryant. Although Quinn and Kirsch threw back-to-back interceptions, neither team scored again in the third, leaving the score 35–14. The Irish started the fourth quarter scoring with a 22-yard touchdown pass from Quinn to John Carlson, for Quinn's final series in the game, he would be replaced by back-ups David Wolke and Marty Mooney for the final three drives. Kirsch led the Boilermakers to a 5-yard touchdown rush by Kory Sheets for his final drive of the game, he would be replaced by Curtis Painter for their final two drives. The Irish, helped by Wolke's only completion of the game for 29 yards, scored again with a 10-yard rushing touchdown by Travis Thomas, for the final Irish score of the game. After both teams had turnovers, Painter and the Boilermakers capitalized with Sheets second rushing touchdown of 8 yards, giving the final score with the Irish winning 49–28. With Quinn's touchdown passes, he tied a Notre Dame record held by John Huarte of 10 straight games with touchdown passes, and also became the only Irish quarterback to pass for 300 yards in 3 straight games. After the game, the Irish moved up to 12th in the nation and would move up again to 9th before their next game, while the Boilermakers dropped from the rankings.

=== USC ===
	1	2	3	4	Total
#1 Trojans	14	0	7	13	34
#9 Irish	7	14	0	10	31

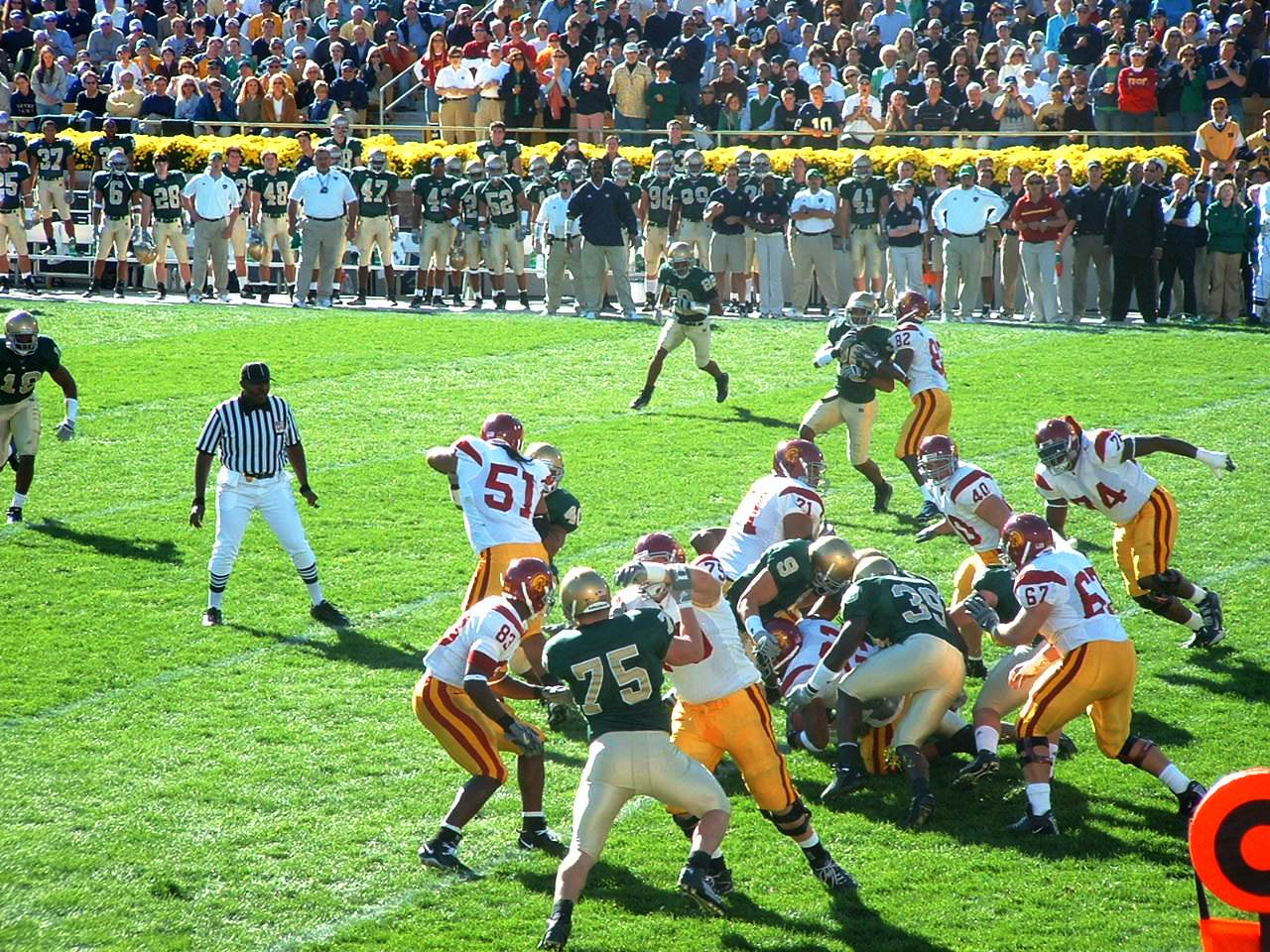
Notre Dame defense during the first half of game action

In a game that looked to be overshadowed by pre-game hype and assertions of being the newest "Game of the Century" the meeting between perennial rivals, Notre Dame and USC, called by some the greatest intersectional rivalry in college football, would be the 77th meeting between the schools, who play for the Jeweled Shillelagh. The Trojans, led by coach Pete Carroll and Heisman-winning senior quarterback Matt Leinart, were ranked first in the country, were on a 27-game winning streak, and had won three straight meetings with the Irish, each by 31 points. Expectations, however, were high that this game would be closer.

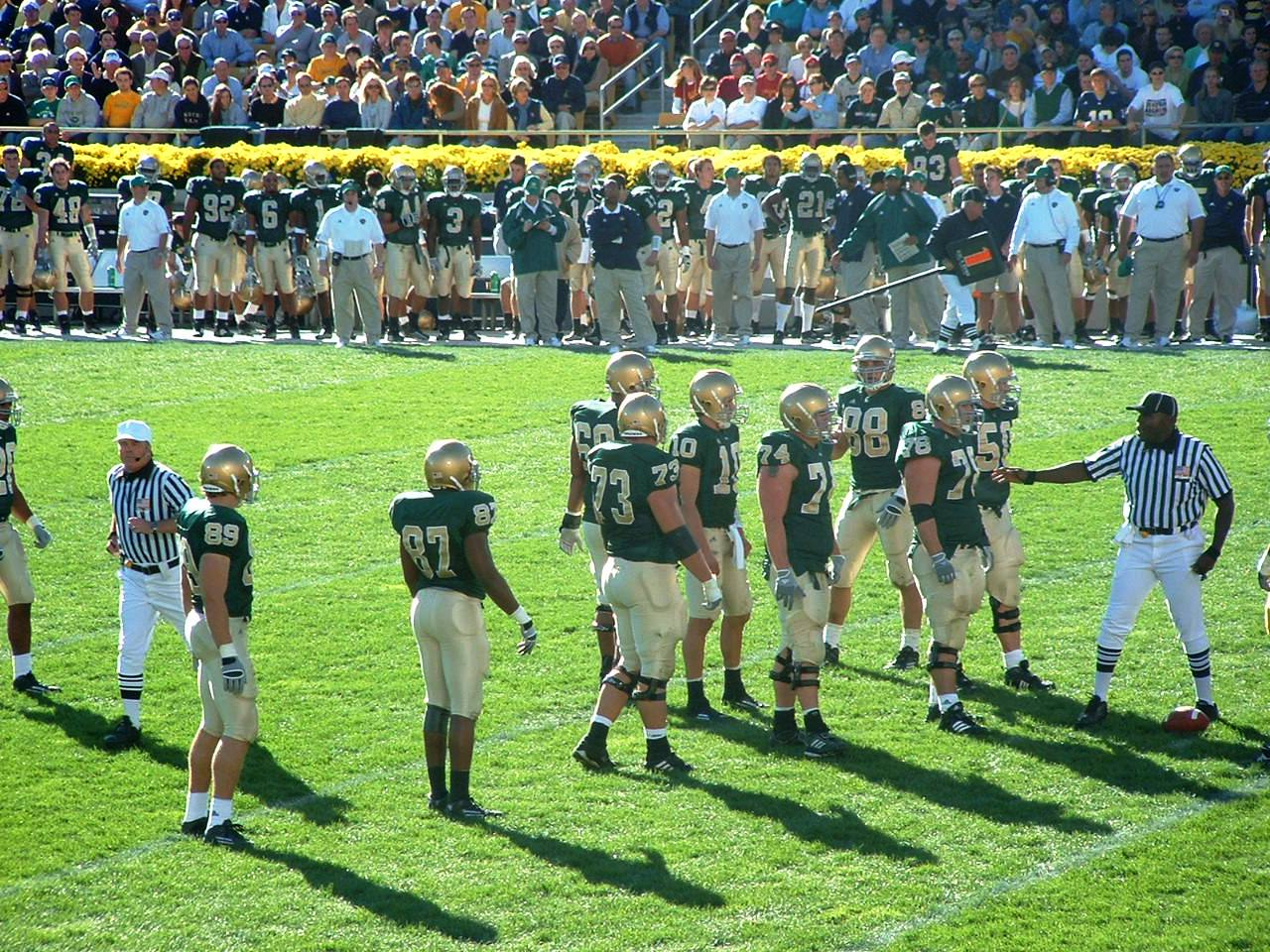
Brady Quinn and the offense, donning the green jerseys, line up for a play

In a surprise move, after Weis insisted it wouldn't happen, the Irish wore green jerseys for the game. The score was back and forth for much of the game, with the Irish leading 21–14 at halftime after a pair of touchdowns by running backs Reggie Bush and LenDale White for the Trojans, and a rushing touchdown by Travis Thomas, a passing touchdown by Brady Quinn, and a punt return for a touchdown by Tom Zbikowski for the Irish. The Trojans took a 28–24 lead with five minutes left in the game when Reggie Bush ran for his third touchdown of the game, however, Quinn answered with four complete passes and his own 5-yard touchdown run to give the Irish a 31–28 lead with less than two minutes remaining. On the Trojans last series, however, Leinart, after being sacked and facing a fourth down on his own 26-yard line, completed a 61-yard fade to Dwayne Jarrett to give the Trojans a last chance near the Irish goal line. After a series of plays including Leinart fumbling the ball out of bounds, the stadium clock incorrectly running out of time, and part of the Notre Dame student section rushing the field, the Trojans had the ball on the Irish 1-yard line with seven seconds remaining. Instead of opting for the field goal and going to overtime, Leinart tried to sneak into the end zone. When he was stopped, in a play that would be called the "Bush Push,” Bush pushed him over the goal line for the winning score of 34–31.

On June 10, 2010, the NCAA found that Bush was ineligible for college athletics during the 2005 season and USC was forced to vacate all wins from that year. However, the loss still counts for Notre Dame.

=== BYU ===
BYU at #12 Notre Dame

Team	1	2	3	4	Total
BYU	10	0	13	0	23
• Notre Dame	7	14	21	7	49

- Date: October 22
- Location: Notre Dame Stadium, South Bend, IN
- Game start: 2:30 p.m. EST
- Television network: NBC

Scoring summary
1	9:51	BYU	Jared McLaughlin 44-yard field goal	BYU 3–0
1	7:12	ND	Maurice Stovall 10-yard pass from Brady Quinn (D. J. Fitzpatrick kick)	ND 7–3
1	2:48	BYU	Jonny Harline 12-yard pass from John Beck (Jared McLaughlin kick)	BYU 10–7
2	10:33	ND	Jeff Samardzija 14-yard pass from Brady Quinn (D. J. Fitzpatrick kick)	ND 14–10
2	4:18	ND	Maurice Stovall 15-yard pass from Brady Quinn (D. J. Fitzpatrick kick)	ND 21–10
3	12:50	ND	Jeff Ssmardzija 21-yard pass from Brady Quinn (D. J. Fitzpatrick kick)	ND 28–10
3	9:11	BYU	John Beck 10-yard run (Jared McLaughlin kick)	ND 28–17
3	5:38	BYU	Todd Watkins 10-yard pass from John Beck (pass failed)	ND 28–23
3	4:47	ND	Maurice Stovall 36-yard pass from Brady Quinn (D. J. Fitzpatrick kick)	ND 35–23
3	2:16	ND	Maurice Stovall 24-yard pass from Brady Quinn (D. J. Fitzpatrick kick)	ND 42–23
4	9:24	ND	Tom Zbikowski 83-yard interception return (D. J. Fitzpatrick kick)	ND 49–23

After the disappointment from the loss to USC, the Irish looked to rebound against the BYU Cougars, a team that gave the Irish a season opening loss in 2004. The Cougars were led by junior quarterback John Beck and first-year head coach Bronco Mendenhall. The Cougars had a 3–3 record, but had won their previous two games.

The Cougars started the scoring with a 45-yard field goal, but Brady Quinn, completing six of seven passes on his first drive, threw a 10-yard touchdown to Maurice Stovall to take the lead. Beck led the Cougars on a drive that included an interception by Mike Richardson, that was fumbled and recovered by the Cougars and finished with a 12-yard touchdown pass to Jonny Harline. The Cougars led 10–7 at the end of the first quarter, but a pair of 15-yard Quinn touchdown passes to Jeff Samardzija and Stovall gave the Irish a 21–10 lead at halftime. In the third, Quinn completed three long touchdown passes, two to Stovall and one to Samardzija, while Beck ran for a touchdown and threw another to Todd Watkins to end the third quarter with the Irish leading 42–23. The final score of the game came in the fourth when a Beck pass was intercepted by Tom Zbikowski and returned 83 yards, giving the final score of the game with the Irish winning 49–23. The Irish won their first home game of the season and moved to 9th nationally.

=== Tennessee ===
	1	2	3	4	Total
Volunteers	3	7	11	0	21
#9 Irish	14	7	0	20	41

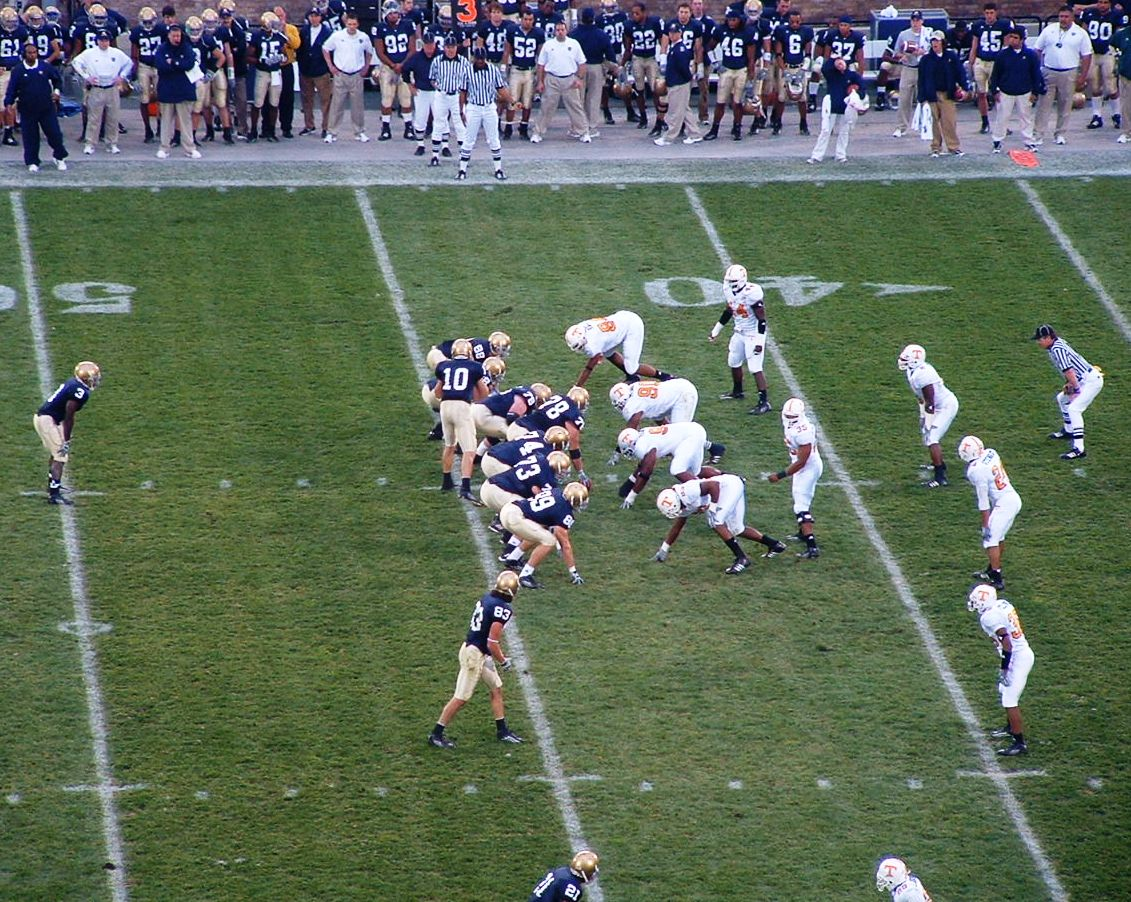
Quinn directs the offense against Tennessee

The Irish next played the struggling Tennessee Volunteers. The teams last met at Tennessee in 2004, when the Irish surprised the top-15 ranked Volunteers with a 17–13 win. The Volunteers were led by coach Phillip Fulmer and quarterback Erik Ainge.

When the Volunteers didn't score on the first drive of the game, the Irish took advantage, with Brady Quinn leading an Irish drive that ended with his 43-yard touchdown pass to Anthony Fasano. The ensuing kickoff was fumbled by the Volunteers, and Quinn threw his second touchdown to Maurice Stovall three plays later. Volunteers' kicker, James Wilhout kicked a 26-yard field goal for their only score of the quarter. In the second quarter, on a Volunteer punt, Tom Zbikowski returned the ball 43-yards to give the Irish a 21–3 lead. After a Quinn fumble that was recovered by the Volunteers, Ainge led a 40-yard drive and threw a 7-yard touchdown pass to Bret Smith to give the halftime score of 21–10. In the second half, after a failed fourth down conversion by the Irish, Wilhout kicked a 30-yard field goal to put the Volunteers down by 8. When the Irish didn't answer, Ainge and running back Arian Foster led the Volunteers to Foster's 3-yard touchdown. With Ainge's pass to Smith completed for a two-point conversion, the game was tied at 21 at the end of the third. In the fourth quarter, however, the Irish scored 20, including two D.J. Fitzpatrick field goals, a Quinn touchdown pass to Jeff Samardzija, and a Zbikowski interception return for a touchdown. With no answers by the Volunteers, the Irish won the game 41–21. With the win, Quinn continued his Irish record touchdown passing streak to 13 games, Samardzija's touchdown catch, his 12th broke an Irish record of touchdown catches in a season, and the Irish moved up in ranking to 7th nationally.

=== Navy ===
	1	2	3	4	Total
Navy	7	0	7	7	21
#7 Irish	7	21	7	7	42

The Irish next played the Navy Midshipmen, a team the Irish had played annually since 1927, and had beaten in 41 straight games, a record NCAA winning streak. Navy was led by option quarterback Lamar Owens and coach Paul Johnson. The game began with a 73-yard Irish drive that ended with a 31-yard touchdown pass from Brady Quinn to Maurice Stovall. Navy answered, after a 69-yard drive that took half of the quarter, when Adam Ballard ran for an 8-yard touchdown. After both teams failed to convert on fourth downs in the second quarter, Quinn led the Irish to a Travis Thomas 12-yard touchdown run. On the next Navy possession, a fumble by Owens was recovered by the Irish. Quinn completed two passes on the drive and Darius Walker ran for a 12-yard touchdown. After a Navy punt, a Quinn pass to Anthony Fasano for an 8-yard touchdown, gave the Irish a 28–7 lead at halftime. A six-minute drive by Navy to start the second half ended in a 1-yard touchdown run by Owens to bring Navy to within two touchdowns, but Quinn answered on the next drive with a 17-yard touchdown pass to Stovall. After both teams threw interceptions, Quinn threw his fourth touchdown of the game, a 10-yard pass to Stovall. With a Brian Hampton 17-yard touchdown to Tyree Barnes, Navy finished the scoring in the game. The Irish won 42–21, with Quinn increasing his Notre Dame record touchdown passing streak to 14 games and the team extending its record winning streak over Navy to 42 games.

=== Syracuse ===
	1	2	3	4	Total
Orange	3	0	0	7	10
#7 Irish	0	14	10	10	34

Notre Dame's next game, and final home game of the season, came against the 1–8 Syracuse Orange. Syracuse, led by first-year coach Greg Robinson and quarterback Perry Patterson, had spoiled the Irish chance of not having a losing season in 2003 when they routed the Irish in the Carrier Dome by 26. This year, however, it seemed like the Orange, ranked last in total yards, were over-matched. The Orange, however, kept up with the Irish in the first quarter, and after a failed field goal attempt by D. J. Fitzpatrick, and a 51-yard run by Damien Rhodes on the ensuing drive, the Orange scored the first points of the game with a 31-yard field goal by John Barker. On the next Irish drive, Fitzpatrick's field goal attempt was blocked, and the Orange kept the lead. However, four minutes later, a 25-yard Brady Quinn pass to Maurice Stovall ended with a touchdown, giving the Irish the lead. A 30-yard pass to Jeff Samardzija, on the second play of the next Irish drive, gave the Irish a 14–3 lead that they would have at halftime. On the first play of the third quarter, Patterson was intercepted by Leo Ferrine, who returned it 17-yards for a touchdown to give the Irish a 21–3 lead. After a failed fourth down attempt at the Orange goal line, and a pair of punts by the Orange, Fitzpatrick gave the Irish a 24–3 lead with his 44-yard field goal. In the fourth quarter, Fitzpatrick kicked a 29-yard field goal, Darius Walker ran for a 3-yard touchdown, and Patterson threw an 18-yard touchdown to Joseph Kowaleski for the only Orange touchdown of the day, to give the final score of 34–10 in favor of the Irish. With the game, Quinn continued his Notre Dame record touchdown streak and the Irish moved to 6th nationally. They were also one win away from being eligible for a BCS bowl.

=== Stanford ===
	1	2	3	4	Total
#6 Irish	14	0	6	18	38
Cardinal	7	7	0	17	31

The final Irish test of the regular season came on the road against the 5–5 Stanford Cardinal, in the last game in Stanford Stadium before it would be renovated. Stanford, coached by first-year coach Walt Harris and quarterback Trent Edwards, and Notre Dame played annually since 1997 and have a minor rivalry for the Legends Trophy. The Irish had won the three previous seasons when coached by former Cardinal head coach Ty Willingham, and the Cardinal didn't look to have much chance in this game after losing in the Big Game to rival California, with the Bears outrushing the Cardinal by 210 yards.

The Irish took an early lead on the second play of the game when Brady Quinn threw an 80-yard touchdown to Jeff Samardzija, however, after a Quinn interception, Edwards tied the game with a 27-yard touchdown to Mark Bradford. The Irish scored the last points of the quarter with another Quinn touchdown to Samardzija, this time for 7 yards to bring the game to 14–7 in favor of the Irish. In the second quarter, after both teams failed to convert fourth downs, a 38-yard Edwards pass to Justin McCullum, tied the game once again. Although Quinn threw his second interception of the game later in the quarter, neither team scored again in the half. In the third quarter, Quinn threw his third touchdown to Maurice Stovall for 10-yards, however, D. J. Fitzpatrick missed the extra point, and left the Irish only winning by 6. With a missed 42-yard field goal by Fitzpatrick, and the Cardinal not scoring in the quarter, the Irish took a 20–14 lead to the fourth quarter. Early in the fourth quarter, Carl Gioia replaced Fitzpatrick and kicked a 29-yard field goal to put the Irish up two scores, however, on his kickoff, T.J. Rushing returned the ball 87-yards to bring the Cardinal to within two points. Quinn then brought the Irish on an 80-yard drive that ended with a Travis Thomas 8-yard touchdown run. The Cardinal were only able to answer with a 31-yard field goal that made the score 30–24 in favor of the Irish. Fitzpatrick was brought in during the next Irish drive, but missed a 29-yard field goal that would have put the Irish up by two scores. The Cardinal, who had brought in backup quarterback T.C. Ostrander when Edwards didn't move the ball in the third quarter, capitalized on the miss and took the lead on a 4-yard pass to Matt Traverso, with less than two minutes left in the game. Quinn then completed three long passes and Darius Walker ran the last 6-yards for the go-ahead touchdown. A direct snap to Walker on the two-point conversion put the Irish up by a touchdown with less than a minute remaining. Ostrander was able to bring the Cardinal to their 38-yard line on a 14-yard pass, but was sacked on a fourth down to seal the win for the Irish, 38–31. With the win the Irish were eligible for a BCS bowl, and although falling to 7th in the rankings, were ranked 6th by the BCS and invited to the Fiesta Bowl.

=== Fiesta Bowl ===
	1	2	3	4	Total
#6 Irish	7	0	6	7	20
#4 Buckeyes	7	14	3	10	34

With 9 wins and a ranking of 6th in the BCS polls, the Irish were invited to the Fiesta Bowl, held in Sun Devil Stadium in Tempe Arizona, to face the number 4 ranked Ohio State Buckeyes. The BCS appearance was only the second for the Irish and the first since a 2000 loss to the Oregon State Beavers in the Fiesta Bowl. The Buckeyes, led by coach Jim Tressel and junior quarterback Troy Smith, had a 9–2 record, with losses to BCS contender Penn State and eventual national champion Texas. Although both teams had long football histories, they had only met four times previous to this game, the latest in 1996.

The Irish took an early lead on a 20-yard run by Darius Walker, but Smith answered for the Buckeyes three minutes later with a 56-yard pass to Ted Ginn Jr. to tie the game. After Smith fumbled the ball on the Buckeye 15-yard line, the Irish had another chance to take the lead. However, after not gaining a first down after three plays, they attempted a fourth down conversion, during which Quinn was sacked. Without scoring, the quarter ended with the game tied at 7. On the third play of the second quarter, Smith once again scored a touchdown on a 68-yard pass to Ginn to give the Buckeyes a lead they would never relinquish. On the Buckeyes next drive, Smith brought them to the Irish 15-yard line, before his fumble was recovered by the Irish. The Irish, however, couldn't take advantage, and on the Buckeyes next drive Smith threw an 85-yard touchdown pass to Santonio Holmes to give the Buckeyes a 21–7 lead. With a blocked field goal attempt by the Buckeyes, the score stayed the same at the half. In the third quarter, the Irish blocked a second field goal attempt, and finally took advantage with a 10-yard rushing touchdown by Walker. With a missed extra point, and a 40-yard field goal by Josh Huston on the Buckeyes next possession, the Buckeyes took a 24–13 lead into the fourth quarter. In the fourth, Huston added another field goal, and Walker ran for a third touchdown, before Antonio Pittman ran for his own 60-yard touchdown for the final score of the game. The Buckeyes won 34–20, giving the Irish their NCAA record-tying 8th straight bowl game loss.

Notre Dame also finished 2–2 against schools from the Big Ten in 2005.

== Personnel ==
2005 Notre Dame Fighting Irish football team roster
Players
Coaches
Offense

Pos.	#	Name	Class
WR	1	D.J. Hord	Fr
RB	3	Darius Walker	So
WR	5	Rhema McKnight	Sr
WR	7	Darrin Bragg	So
RB	8	Junior Jabbie	So
QB	10	Brady Quinn	Jr
WR	11	David Grimes	Fr
QB	12	Marty Mooney	Sr
QB	13	Evan Sharpley	Fr
QB	14	David Wolke	So
RB	16	Rashon Powers-Neal	Sr
QB	17	Dan Gorski	Fr
WR	21	Maurice Stovall	Sr
WR	23	Chase Anastasio	Jr
WR	24	Brandon Erickson	So
RB	26	Travis Thomas	Jr
RB	27	John Lyons	Jr
RB	32	Jeff Jenkins	Sr
RB	33	Justin Hoskins	So
RB	35	Ashley McConnell	Jr
WR	38	Nick Possley	So
RB	44	Asaph Schwapp	Fr
FB	49	Matt Augustyn	Jr
OL	50	Dan Santucci	Sr
OL	54	David Fitzgerald	Sr
OL	59	James Bent	Sr
OL	62	Scott Raridon	Sr
OL	63	Jeff Tisak	Fr
OL	68	Ryan Harris	Jr
OL	71	James Bonelli	Sr
OL	72	Paul Duncan	Fr
OL	73	Mark LeVoir	Sr
OL	74	Dan Stevenson	Sr
OL	76	Bob Morton	Sr
OL	77	Michael Turkovich	Fr
OL	78	John Sullivan	Jr
OL	79	Brian Mattes	Sr
WR	81	Rob Woods	Sr
WR	82	Matt Shelton	Sr
WR	83	Jeff Samardzija	Jr
WR	84	Michael O'Hara	Sr
TE	85	Joey Hiben	Fr
TE	86	Mike Talerico	So
TE	87	Marcus Freeman	Sr
TE	88	Anthony Fasano	Sr
TE	89	John Carlson	Jr

Defense

Pos.	#	Name	Class
DB	4	Anthony Vernaglia	So
DB	6	Ray Herring	Fr
DB	9	Tom Zbikowski	Jr
DB	15	Leo Ferrine	So
DB	18	Chinedum Ndukwe	Jr
DB	20	Terrail Lambert	So
DB	22	Ambrose Wooden	Jr
DB	23	William David Williams	So
DL	25	Nate Schiccatano	Sr
DB	26	Wade Iams	So
DB	27	David Bruton	Fr
DB	28	Kyle McCarthy	Fr
DB	29	LaBrose Hedgemon II	Jr
DB	30	Mike Richardson	Sr
DB	31	Jake Carney	Sr
DB	32	Alvin Reynolds	So
DB	34	Tommie Lee	Jr
DB	35	Tim Kenney	Jr
DB	36	Brandon Harris	Sr
DB	37	Matt Mitchell	Sr
LB	39	Brandon Hoyte	Sr
LB	40	Maurice Crum Jr.	So
LB	41	Scott Smith	Fr
LB	42	Kevin Washington	Fr
LB	43	Anthony Salvador	Sr
DB	45	Rich Whitney III	Jr
LB	46	Corey Mays	Sr
LB	47	Mitchell Thomas	Jr
LB	48	Steve Quinn	Fr
LB	52	Joe Brockington	Jr
LB	53	Joseph Boland	Sr
LB	56	Nick Borseti	Jr
DL	57	Dwight Stephenson Jr.	Jr
LB	58	Abdel Banda	So
DL	60	Casey Cullen	Jr
DL	66	Derek Landri	Sr
DL	69	Neil Kennedy	So
DL	75	Chris Frome	Sr
DL	90	Brian Beidatsch	Sr
DL	92	Derrell Hand	Fr
DL	93	Dan Chervanick	Sr
DL	94	Justin Brown	So
DL	95	Victor Abiamiri	Jr
DL	96	Pat Kuntz	Fr
DL	98	Trevor Laws	Jr
DL	99	Ronald Talley	So

Special teams

Pos.	#	Name	Class
P	17	Geoffrey Price	Jr
K	19	D.J. Fitzpatrick	Sr
K	45	Carl Gioia	Jr
LS	61	J.J. Jansen	So
K	91	Craig Cardillo	Jr
K	96	Bobby Renkes	Jr

Head coach

- Charlie Weis

Coordinators/assistant coaches

- Michael Haywood – Offensive Coordinator & Running Backs
- Rob Ianello – Receivers Coach & Recruiting Coordinator
- John Latina – Assistant Head Coach (Offense)/Off. Line
- Bill Lewis – Asst. Head Coach (Defense)/Def. Backs
- Rick Minter – Defensive Coordinator & Linebackers
- Jappy Oliver – Defensive Line Coach
- Bernie Parmalee – Tight Ends Coach/Asst. Special Teams
- Brian Polian – Head Special Teams Coach/Ast. Def. Backs
- Peter Vaas – Quarterbacks
- Jeff Burrow – Defensive Graduate Assistant
- Shane Waldron – Offensive Graduate Assistant

Legend

- (C) Team captain
- (S) Suspended
- (I) Ineligible
- Injured
- Redshirt

Roster

=== Coaching staff ===
When Willingham was fired all of his assistant coaches left, leaving Weis to rebuild a coaching staff. He sought to find experienced coaches that would be able to make the team competitive. When the new assistants were announced in January they were billed as having 25 seasons of collegiate head coaching, 50 seasons as coordinators, 12 seasons as NFL assistant coaches, and 42 bowl victories. Before the season, however, assistant offensive head and quarterbacks coach David Cutcliffe after undergoing heart surgery and being on medical leave, decided to resign, saying he felt his absence unfair to the players and coaches. In early June, Peter Vaas was named as Cutcliffe's replacement. Vaas was a former six-year NFL Europa head coach, an eight-year collegiate head coach, and had 17 years of assistant coaching experience, including two years at Notre Dame under Lou Holtz.

On October 29, only half-way through the season, Weis, who originally signed a six-year contract with the Irish, was offered an extension on his contract. The new 10-year deal was worth $30 to $40 million, and made him the highest paid coach in college football. The extension was seen as controversial, as Weis' record was 5–2 at the time while Willingham started his first season with an 8–0 record.

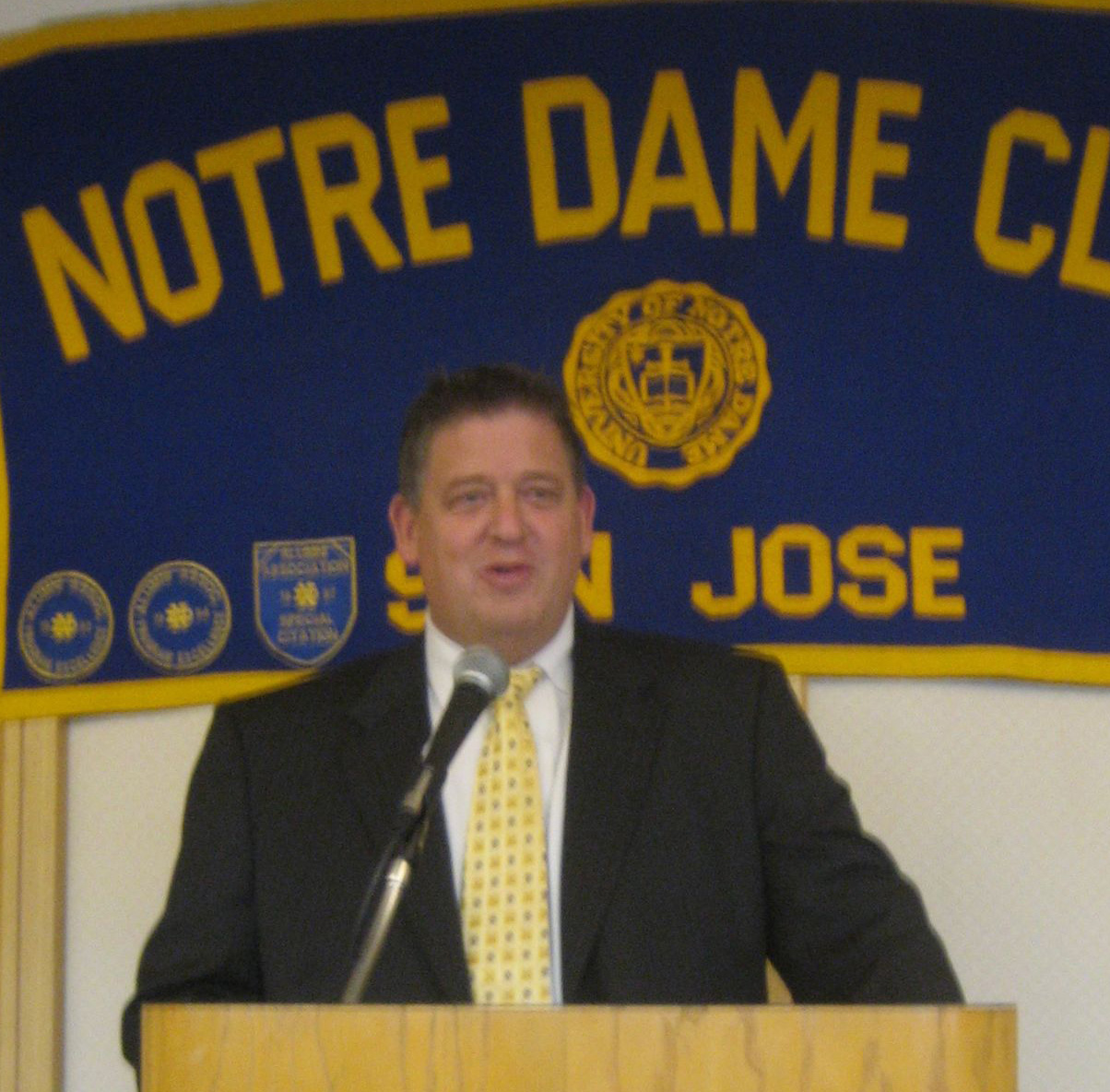
Charlie Weis, head coach

=== Recruits ===
With poor recruiting being one of the issues that led to the firing of Willingham, Weis was challenged to coach the Patriots' offense during the day and work on recruiting players for the Irish at night. He took a proactive role in recruiting, including sending seven of his assistant coaches to a recruit who had de-committed after Willingham was fired (the recruit, however, signed with the Ohio State Buckeyes). Weis, with some of Willingham's recruits signing also, built a class of 15 recruits, including five four star recruits.

College recruiting (2005)
Name	Hometown	School	Height	Weight	40^{‡}	Commit date
David Bruton; DB	Miamisburg, OH	Miamisburg HS	6 ft 2 in (1.88 m)	180 lb (82 kg)	4.5	Jun 29, 2004
David Bruton; DB	Recruit ratings: Scout: Rivals:					
Paul Duncan; OL	Dallas, GA	Eas Paulding HS	6 ft 6 in (1.98 m)	282 lb (128 kg)	5.43	Jan 11, 2005
Paul Duncan; OL	Recruit ratings: Scout: Rivals:					
David Grimes; WR	Detroit, MI	Detroit City HS	5 ft 9 in (1.75 m)	157 lb (71 kg)	4.5	Jul 18, 2004
David Grimes; WR	Recruit ratings: Scout: Rivals:					
Derrell Hand; DT	Philadelphia, PA	West Philadelphia Catholic HS	6 ft 2 in (1.88 m)	298 lb (135 kg)	5.62	Jan 19, 2005
Derrell Hand; DT	Recruit ratings: Scout: Rivals:					
Ray Herring; S	Melbourne, FL	Holy Trinity Episcopal School	5 ft 10 in (1.78 m)	187 lb (85 kg)	4.5	Jan 19, 2005
Ray Herring; S	Recruit ratings: Scout: Rivals:					
Joey Hiben; TE	Waconia, MN	Waconia Sr.	6 ft 5 in (1.96 m)	235 lb (107 kg)	4.7	Nov 8, 2004
Joey Hiben; TE	Recruit ratings: Scout: Rivals:					
D.J. Hord; WR	Kansas City, MO	Rockhurst HS	6 ft 1 in (1.85 m)	195 lb (88 kg)	4.4	Jan 15, 2005
D.J. Hord; WR	Recruit ratings: Scout: Rivals:					
Patrick Kuntz; DE	Indianapolis, IN	Roncalli HS	6 ft 4 in (1.93 m)	255 lb (116 kg)	4.8	Jan 15, 2005
Patrick Kuntz; DE	Recruit ratings: Scout: Rivals:					
Kyle McCarthy; CB	Youngstown, OH	Cardinal Mooney HS	6 ft 0 in (1.83 m)	172 lb (78 kg)	4.47	Jan 23, 2005
Kyle McCarthy; CB	Recruit ratings: Scout: Rivals:					
Steve Quinn; LB	Philadelphia, PA	St. Joseph's Prep School	6 ft 2 in (1.88 m)	208 lb (94 kg)	4.62	Feb 2, 2005
Steve Quinn; LB	Recruit ratings: Scout: Rivals:					
Asaph Schwapp; RB	Hartford, CT	Weaver HS	6 ft 0 in (1.83 m)	247 lb (112 kg)	4.64	Jul 15, 2004
Asaph Schwapp; RB	Recruit ratings: Scout: Rivals:					
Evan Sharpley; QB	Marshall, MI	Marshall HS	6 ft 2 in (1.88 m)	200 lb (91 kg)	4.7	Jul 18, 2004
Evan Sharpley; QB	Recruit ratings: Scout: Rivals:					
Scott Smith; LB	Highland Park, IL	Highland Park, HS	6 ft 3 in (1.91 m)	222 lb (101 kg)	4.75	Jul 16, 2004
Scott Smith; LB	Recruit ratings: Scout: Rivals:					
Michael Turkovich; OL	Wayne, PA	Valley Forge Military Academy	6 ft 7 in (2.01 m)	280 lb (130 kg)	5	Jan 8, 2005
Michael Turkovich; OL	Recruit ratings: Scout: Rivals:					
Kevin Washington; LB	Sugar Land, TX	Steven F. Austin HS	6 ft 0 in (1.83 m)	213 lb (97 kg)	4.59	Jul 18, 2004
Kevin Washington; LB	Recruit ratings: Scout: Rivals:					
Overall recruit ranking: Scout: #27 Rivals: #40
‡ Refers to 40-yard dash; Note: In many cases, Scout, Rivals, 247Sports, On3, and ESPN may conflict in their listings of height, weight and 40 time.; In these cases, the average was taken. ESPN grades are on a 100-point scale.; Sources: "Notre Dame Commit List 2005". Rivals.; "Scout.com Football Recruiting: Notre Dame". Scout.; "Scout.com Team Recruiting Rankings". Scout.; "2005 Team Ranking". Rivals.com.

== Statistics and records ==
By the end of the season, the 2005 team set 47 Notre Dame team and individual records. The team set 11 season records, including most points (440) and most offensive yards (5728). Four players set individual season records, including Jeff Samardzija's touchdown receptions (15), Brady Quinn's touchdown passes (32), Darius Walker's receptions by a running back (43), and D. J. Fitzpatrick's PATs (52). Seven individual game records were set, including Quinn's touchdown passes (6) and Maurice Stovall's receptions (14). Samardzija set a record with 8 consecutive touchdown catches, Walker another record with four consecutive 100-yard rushing games, and Quinn's record of 16 consecutive games with a touchdown pass that began in 2004 and ended in the Fiesta Bowl. With his records this season, Quinn holds 30 Notre Dame individual records, including games with 300-yards passing (5) becoming the only Irish player to throw for 400-yards in a game more than once.

Passing

1. Brady Quinn - 292 of 450 (64.9%) for 3,919 yards, 32 touchdowns, and 7 interceptions, 158.4 passer rating

Rushing

1. Darius Walker - 1,196 yards on 253 carries, 4.7-yard average, 9 touchdowns
2. Travis Thomas - 248 yards on 63 carries, 3.9-yard average, 5 touchdowns
3. Rashon Powers-Neal - 100 yards on 31 carries, 3.2-yard average,6 touchdowns

Receiving

1. Jeff Samardzija - 77 receptions for 1,249 yards and 15 touchdowns, 16.2-yard average
2. Maurice Stovall - 69 reeptions for 1,149 yards and 11 touchdowns, 16.7-yard average
3. Anthony Fasano - 47 receptions for 576 yards and 2 touchdowns, 12.3-yard average
4. Darius Walker - 43 receptions for 351 yards and 2 touchdowns, 8.2-yard average
5. Matt Shelton - 28 receptions for 329 yards and 0 touchdowns, 11.8-yard average

Scoring

1. Jeff Samardzija - 90 points, 15 touchdowns
2. D.J. Fitzpatrick - 85 points, 52 of 54 PAT, 11 of 17 field goals
3. Darius Walker - 68 points, 11 touchdowns, 1 two-point conversion
4. Maurice Stovall - 66 points, 11 touchdowns
5. Rashon Powers-Neal - 36 points, 6 touchdowns
6. Travis Thomas - 30 points, 5 touchdowns
7. Tom Zbikowski - 24 points, 4 touchdowns

== Awards and honors ==
Head coach Charlie Weis was named by the Football Writers Association of America as the Eddie Robinson Coach of the Year.

Offensive coordinator Michael Haywood was named by the American Football Coaches Association as the Assistant Coach of the Year.

Wide receiver Jeff Samardzija was named as a consensus first-team pick on the 2005 All-America college football team. He was also a finalist for the Fred Biletnikoff Award. He received first-team honors from six selectors. Samardzija was also named as Notre Dame's NCAA record 79th Consensus All American.

Quarterback Brady Quinn won the Sammy Baugh Trophy. He also finished fourth in the Heisman Trophy balloting. He also received third-team All-America honors from the Associated Press.

Samardzija and Quinn shared the team's most valuable player award.

Tight end Anthony Fasano was a finalist for the John Mackey Award.

Back Tom Zbikowski received third-team All-America honors.

Center John Sullivan was named by the Walter Camp Football Foundation as the Connecticut Player of the Year.

== 2006 NFL draft ==
In the 2006 NFL draft, three Irish players were drafted by NFL teams. Fasano was taken by the Dallas Cowboys in the second round of the draft, Maurice Stovall was taken by the Tampa Bay Buccaneers in the third round, and Dan Stevenson was taken in the sixth round by the New England Patriots. In addition to the three players taken in the draft, six signed free agent contracts with NFL teams.
