= Daniel Fitzpatrick =

Daniel Fitzpatrick may refer to:

- D. J. Fitzpatrick (born 1982), American footballer
- Daniel R. Fitzpatrick (1891–1969), American editorial cartoonist
- Daniel Fitzpatrick (politician), member of the New Hampshire House of Representatives
