= A. J. Hawk =

American football player and sports analyst (born 1984)

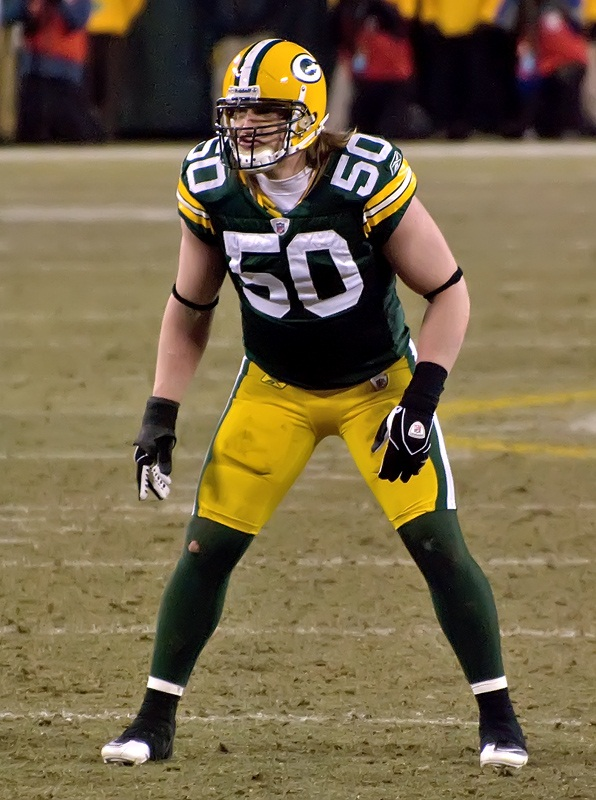
- Hawk with the Green Bay Packers in 2011

No. 50, 54
- Position: Linebacker

Personal information
- Born: January 6, 1984 (age 42); Kettering, Ohio, U.S.
- Listed height: 6 ft 1 in (1.85 m)
- Listed weight: 240 lb (109 kg)

Career information
- High school: Centerville (Centerville, Ohio)
- College: Ohio State (2002–2005)
- NFL draft: 2006: 1st round, 5th overall pick

Career history
- Green Bay Packers (2006–2014); Cincinnati Bengals (2015); Atlanta Falcons (2016)

Awards and highlights
- Super Bowl champion (XLV); PFWA All-Rookie Team (2006); BCS national champion (2002); Lombardi Award (2005); Jack Lambert Trophy (2005); Unanimous All-American (2005); Consensus All-American (2004); Big Ten Defensive Player of the Year (2005); 3× First-team All-Big Ten (2003–2005)

Career NFL statistics
- Total tackles: 947
- Sacks: 20.0
- Forced fumbles: 3
- Fumble recoveries: 5
- Pass deflections: 34
- Interceptions: 9
- Stats at Pro Football Reference

Aaron James Hawk (born January 6, 1984) is an American sports analyst and former professional football linebacker who played for 11 seasons in the National Football League (NFL). He was selected by the Green Bay Packers fifth overall in the 2006 NFL draft and he later won Super Bowl XLV with the team. He was also a member of the Cincinnati Bengals and Atlanta Falcons. He played college football for the Ohio State Buckeyes, where he earned All-American honors twice and won the Lombardi Award as a senior. He won the BCS National Championship Game with the Buckeyes as a freshman. He co-hosts The Pat McAfee Show weekdays on YouTube and ESPN.

== Early life ==
Hawk was born in Kettering, Ohio, and grew up in Centerville, a suburb of Dayton. He attended Centerville High School, where he was a teammate of former Cincinnati Bengals kicker Mike Nugent on the football team. As a freshman at Centerville High School, Hawk made the varsity football team. He holds multiple defensive records and was one of three active NFL players who played for the Centerville Elks high school football team. Hawk's records include most tackles in a game (31) on three occasions. He also has the most career tackles (583). Hawk was a two-time All-State player in high school (1999 and 2000).

== College career ==
Hawk enrolled in Ohio State University, and played for coach Jim Tressel's Ohio State Buckeyes football team from 2002 to 2005. Ohio State won the 2002 BCS National Championship with Hawk as a freshman. During his four-year Buckeye career, he played in 51 games, starting 38 of them. He had 394 tackles with 196 of them solo, 41 of them for losses, 15 and a half sacks, seven interceptions, and 13 passes broken up. He also had two fumble recoveries, three forced fumbles, and two touchdowns, one on a blocked punt and one on an interception. His performances earned him first-team All-Big Ten honors in all three years he started and the Most Valuable Player award for the Tostitos Fiesta Bowl. Following his senior season of 2005, he won the Lombardi Award as the best college football linebacker, and was recognized as a unanimous All-American.

=== Honoring Pat Tillman ===
Before the 2005 season for the Ohio State Buckeyes, Hawk, along with fellow starting linebackers Bobby Carpenter and Anthony Schlegel and center Nick Mangold, grew their hair out long to honor Pat Tillman. They made the decision to do so after reading about him in Jim Tressel's 2004 Winners Manual handed out to all the players in the fall. Tillman turned down a National Football League (NFL) contract worth $3.6 million to join the Army in May 2002, after the outbreak of The War on Terror and was killed in action by friendly fire on April 22, 2004.

== Professional career ==
Pre-draft measurables
Height	Weight	Arm length	Hand span	40-yard dash	10-yard split	20-yard split	20-yard shuttle	Three-cone drill	Vertical jump	Broad jump	Bench press
6 ft 1 in (1.85 m)	248 lb (112 kg)	31 1/8 in (0.79 m)	9 3/4 in (0.25 m)	4.64 s	1.57 s	2.72 s	3.96 s	6.82 s	40 in (1.02 m)	9 ft 7 in (2.92 m)	24 reps
All values from NFL Combine

=== Green Bay Packers ===
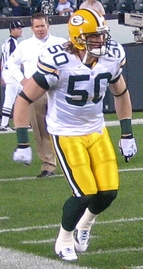
Hawk in 2006 during player introductions

The Green Bay Packers selected Hawk in the first round (fifth overall) of the 2006 NFL draft. He was the first linebacker drafted in 2006.

==== 2006 ====
On July 28, 2006, the Green Bay Packers signed Hawk to a six-year, $37.50 million contract that included $14.76 million guaranteed and a signing bonus of $1.91 million. Head coach Mike McCarthy named Hawk the starting weakside linebacker to begin his rookie season, alongside strongside linebacker Brady Poppinga and middle linebacker Nick Barnett.

He made his professional regular season debut during the Green Bay Packers' season-opener against the Chicago Bears and made five combined tackle (three solo) and one pass deflection during their 26–0 loss. On September 24, 2006, Hawk recorded eight combined tackles (five solo) and made his first career sack on Detroit Lions quarterback Jon Kitna for a nine-yard loss during the fourth quarter. In Week 12, Hawk collected a season-high 15 combined tackles (ten solo) during a 34–24 loss at the Seattle Seahawks. On December 10, 2006, Hawk recorded five combined tackles (four solo), a pass deflection, and made his first career interception during a 30–19 win at the San Francisco 49ers in Week 14. He intercepted a pass by 49ers' quarterback Alex Smith, that was originally intended for Vernon Davis, and returned it for a 25-yard gain during the fourth quarter. Hawk started in all 16 games as a rookie in 2006 and finished the season with 119 combined tackles (82 solo), six pass deflections, 3.5 sacks, two interceptions, and a forced fumble. He was third place in voting for the Associated Press Defensive Rookie of the Year.

==== 2007 ====
Defensive coordinator Bob Sanders retained Hawk, Barnett, and Poppinga as the starting linebackers in 2007. In Week 3, he collected a season-high 11 combined tackles (five solo) during a 31–24 victory against the San Diego Chargers. He finished the season with 105 combined tackle (78 solo), four pass deflections, a sack, and one interception in 16 games and 16 starts. The Green Bay Packers finished first in the NFC North with a 13–3 record and earned a first round bye. On January 12, 2008, Hawk started in his first career playoff game and made one solo tackle during the Packers' 42–20 victory against the Seattle Seahawks during the NFC Divisional Playoff. The following week, Hawk made seven combined tackles (four solo) and one sack as the Packers lost 23–20 against the New York Giants in the NFC Championship Game. The New York Giants went on to defeat the New England Patriots 17–14 in Super Bowl XLII.

==== 2008 ====
Hawk returned as the starting left outside linebacker for the third consecutive season under defensive coordinator Bob Sanders. He started in the Green Bay Packers' season-opening 24–19 victory against the Minnesota Vikings and collected a season-high ten combined tackles (seven solo). In Week 11, Hawk replaced Nick Barnett as the starting middle linebacker after Barnett was placed on injured-reserve due to a torn ACL he sustained against the Minnesota Vikings the previous game. Hawk finished the 2008 NFL season with 86 combined tackles (67 solo), three sacks, and one pass deflection in 16 games and 16 starts. The Green Bay Packers finished the season with a 6–10 record and did not qualify for the playoffs.

==== 2009 ====
On January 6, 2009, it was announced that Green Bay Packers' head coach Mike McCarthy had released defensive coordinator Bob Sanders and five defensive assistants. On January 19, 2009, the Green Bay Packers announced their decision to hire former New England Patriots' secondary coach Dom Capers. Capers installed a base 3–4 defense. Due to the change, Hawk was moved from weakside linebacker to inside linebacker. Head coach Mike McCarthy named Hawk and Nick Barnett the starting inside linebackers, alongside outside linebackers Aaron Kampman and Clay Matthews III. In Week 3, Hawk collected a season-high ten combined tackles (eight solo) during a 36–17 win at the St. Louis Rams. He appeared in all 16 games in 2009 and had 14 starts with 89 combined tackles (67 solo), two pass deflections, two interceptions, and one sack.

==== 2010 ====
Hawk and Barnett retained their roles as the starting inside linebackers in 2010 and played alongside Clay Matthews III and Brad Jones. In Week 4, Hawk recorded 12 combined tackles (nine solo), two pass deflections, and intercepted a pass by Lions' quarterback Shaun Hill during a 28–26 win against the Detroit Lions. In Week 6, he collected a season-high 13 combined tackle (five solo) during a 23–20 loss to the Miami Dolphins. On December 26, 2010, Hawk made six combined tackles (five solo), deflected two passes, and intercepted his third pass of the season during a 45–17 win against the New York Giants. Hawk intercepted a pass by Giants' quarterback Eli Manning, that was intended for running back Ahmad Bradshaw, during the fourth quarter. He finished the 2010 NFL season with 111 combined tackles (72 solo), a career-high ten pass deflections, a career-high three interceptions, and was credited with half a sack in 16 games and 15 starts.

The Green Bay Packers finished the season with a 10–6 record and earned a wildcard berth. On February 6, 2011, Hawk appeared in Super Bowl XLV with the Green Bay Packers and made five combined tackles (two solo) and deflected a pass as they defeated the Pittsburgh Steelers 31–25.

==== 2011 ====
On March 2, 2011, the Green Bay Packers officially released Hawk as he was due $10 million for the 2011 NFL season. On March 3, 2011, the Green Bay Packers signed Hawk to a new five-year, $33.75 million contract that included $9.50 million guaranteed and a signing bonus of $8 million. Hawk was released and re-signed in order for the Packers to free up cap space for the 2011 NFL season. Hawk retained his role as a starting inside linebacker, but played alongside Desmond Bishop after Nick Barnett was released. On October 21, 2011, it was reported that Hawk had received a $10,000 fine from the NFL for making an obscene gesture after making a sack during the Packers' 24–3 victory against the St. Louis Rams the previous week. On November 24, 2011, Hawk recorded six combined tackles (four solo) and a pass deflection before exiting during halftime of the Packers' 27–15 victory at the Detroit Lions due to a calf injury. He was inactive for the next two games (Weeks 13–14), ending his 91 consecutive games streak. In Week 16, he collected a season-high 12 combined tackles (six solo) during a 35–21 win against the Chicago Bears. Hawk finished the 2011 NFL season with 84 combined tackles (53 solo), three pass deflections, and 1.5 sacks in 14 games and 14 starts.

==== 2012 ====
Defensive coordinator Dom Capers retained Hawk and Desmond Bishop as the starting inside linebackers for the second consecutive year, along with outside linebackers Erik Walden and Clay Matthews III. He started in the Green Bay Packers' season-opener against the San Francisco 49ers and collected a career-high 14 combined tackles (ten solo) during their 30–22 loss. Hawk started in all 16 games a made a career-high 120 combined tackles (81 solo) and three sacks.

==== 2013 ====
On March 18, 2013, Hawk agreed to restructure his contract. The Green Bay Packers reduced his 2013 salary from $5.45 million to $3.6 million, his 2014 salary was reduced by $2.5 million, and his 2015 salary was reduced by nearly $3 million. All told, the total value of the remaining three years on Hawk's deal was reduced by about $7 million ($17.85 million to $10.6 million), providing the Packers with more cap space. Head coach Mike McCarthy named Hawk and Brad Jones the starting inside linebackers, alongside outside linebacker Clay Matthews III and Nick Perry. On October 13, 2013, Hawk made ten combined tackles (eight solo) and a career-high three sacks during a 19–17 victory at the Baltimore Ravens in Week 6. In Week 13, he recorded a season-high 12 combined tackles (eight solo) and one pass deflection as the Packers lost 40–10 at the Detroit Lions. Hawk finished the 2013 NFL season with 118 combined tackles (74 solo), a career-high five sacks, five pass deflections, and one interception in 16 games and 16 starts.

==== 2014 ====
Hawk and Brad Jones returned as the starting inside linebacker duo in 2014 and played alongside Clay Matthews III and Julius Peppers. In Week 4, he made a season-high 13 combined tackles (ten solo) during a 38–17 win at the Chicago Bears. He appeared in all 16 games in 2014 and had 13 starts while recording a total of 89 combined tackles (53 solo), two pass deflections, and was credited with half a sack. The Green Bay Packers finished first in the NFC North with a 12–4 record and earned a first round bye. On January 18, 2015, Hawk made one tackle as the Packers lost 28–22 at the Seattle Seahawks in overtime during the NFC Championship Game. Defensive coordinator Dom Capers chose to start Clay Matthews III and Sam Barrington at inside linebacker with Julius Peppers and Nick Perry as the starting outside linebackers during the NFC Championship Game. Hawk and Brad Jones began to lose their starting roles midseason after the Packers' defense ranked last against the run. This marked Hawk's last appearance as a member of the Green Bay Packers.

==== 2015 ====
On February 25, 2015, Hawk was released by the Packers. Hawk led the team in tackles in five of his nine seasons in Green Bay.

=== Cincinnati Bengals ===
On March 10, 2015, the Cincinnati Bengals signed Hawk to a two-year, $3.25 million contract that included $500,000 guaranteed. Head coach Marvin Lewis named Hawk the starting strongside linebacker, alongside Vincent Rey and Rey Maualuga. In Week 3, he collected a season-high six combined tackles (five solo) during a 28–24 win at the Baltimore Ravens. Hawk recorded his first sack with the Bengals in a Week 10 game against the Houston Texans. He appeared in 16 games with the Cincinnati Bengals with 11 starts and finished the season with 24 combined tackles (16 solo) and one sack.

On April 26, 2016, the Cincinnati Bengals officially released Hawk.

=== Atlanta Falcons ===
On October 4, 2016, the Atlanta Falcons signed Hawk to a one-year, $985,000 contract that included a signing bonus of $15,000. Hawk was signed after Sean Weatherspoon sustained a torn Achilles two days prior. He appeared in the Falcons' Week 5 23–16 victory at the Denver Broncos, but did not record a stat. Hawk remained inactive as a healthy scratch for the next two games (Weeks 6–7). On October 25, 2016, the Atlanta Falcons officially released Hawk.

=== Retirement ===
On January 7, 2017, Hawk announced his retirement on a podcast with Albert Breer.

On April 18, 2017, Hawk informed Packers' general manager Ted Thompson of his decision to retire with the Packers. Thompson said, “The first thing that needs to be said about A.J. Hawk is that he is a good man. He was a terrific teammate and a true professional during his career, and we were lucky to have him. A.J. will always be a Packer. We wish the best to him and the entire Hawk family, and thank them for all that they gave to the team and the city of Green Bay.”

Mike McCarthy said, “We were fortunate to make A.J. my first pick as head coach in 2006, and he spent the next nine years giving everything he had to the Green Bay community and the Packers. His leadership and toughness were instrumental in all of our success, and we thank him for all that he did for the organization and the community. We wish A.J., Laura, and the rest of the Hawk family all the best, and I am confident that whatever the future holds, he will be successful.”

== NFL career statistics ==
Legend
	Won the Super Bowl
	Led the league
**Bold**	Career high

=== Regular season ===
Year	Team	GP	Tackles				Fumbles		Interceptions					
Year	Team	GP	Cmb	Solo	Ast	Sck	FF	FR	Int	Yds	Avg	Lng	TD	PD
2006	GB	**16**	119	**82**	37	3.5	**1**	**2**	2	31	15.5	25	0	8
2007	GB	**16**	105	78	27	1.0	**1**	1	1	10	10.0	10	0	4
2008	GB	**16**	86	67	19	3.0	0	0	0	0	0.0	0	0	1
2009	GB	**16**	89	67	22	1.0	**1**	0	2	**42**	**21.0**	**29**	0	2
2010	GB	**16**	111	72	39	0.5	0	1	**3**	31	10.3	21	0	**10**
2011	GB	14	84	53	31	1.5	0	0	0	0	0.0	0	0	3
2012	GB	**16**	**120**	81	39	3.0	0	0	0	0	0.0	0	0	0
2013	GB	**16**	118	74	**44**	**5.0**	**1**	1	1	7	7.0	7	0	4
2014	GB	**16**	89	53	36	0.5	0	0	0	0	0.0	0	0	2
2015	CIN	**16**	24	16	8	1.0	0	0	0	0	0.0	0	0	0
2016	ATL	1	0	0	0	0.0	0	0	0	0	0.0	0	0	0
Total		159	947	644	303	20.0	4	5	9	121	13.4	29	0	35

== Personal life ==
Hawk is married to Laura Hawk (née Quinn), the sister of former NFL quarterback Brady Quinn. They have been married since 2007 and have four children. Another one of his brothers-in-law is Jack Johnson.

Hawk's final game with the Buckeyes was the 2006 Fiesta Bowl against Notre Dame, where Quinn was playing at the time. During the game Laura wore a custom-made jersey, half Ohio State and half Notre Dame, combining Brady's number 10 and Hawk's number 47, making the number 17. Hawk managed to sack his future brother-in-law twice during the game and was co-Most Valuable Player (MVP) of the bowl, which ended with an Ohio State victory.

Hawk hosted a podcast called The HawkCast. During the initial COVID-19 lockdowns in 2020, he teamed up with former Indianapolis Colts punter Pat McAfee on a daily YouTube show called McAfee & Hawk Sports Talk. He currently serves as the co-host for the final two hours of The Pat McAfee Show on ESPN and YouTube. He also occasionally guest-hosts the show when McAfee is not available. As a result of his partnership with McAfee, Hawk (along with other Pat McAfee Show co-hosts) is a playable character in WWE 2K24 as part of the "Pat McAfee Pack" DLC.
