= Chinedum Ndukwe =

American football player (born 1985)

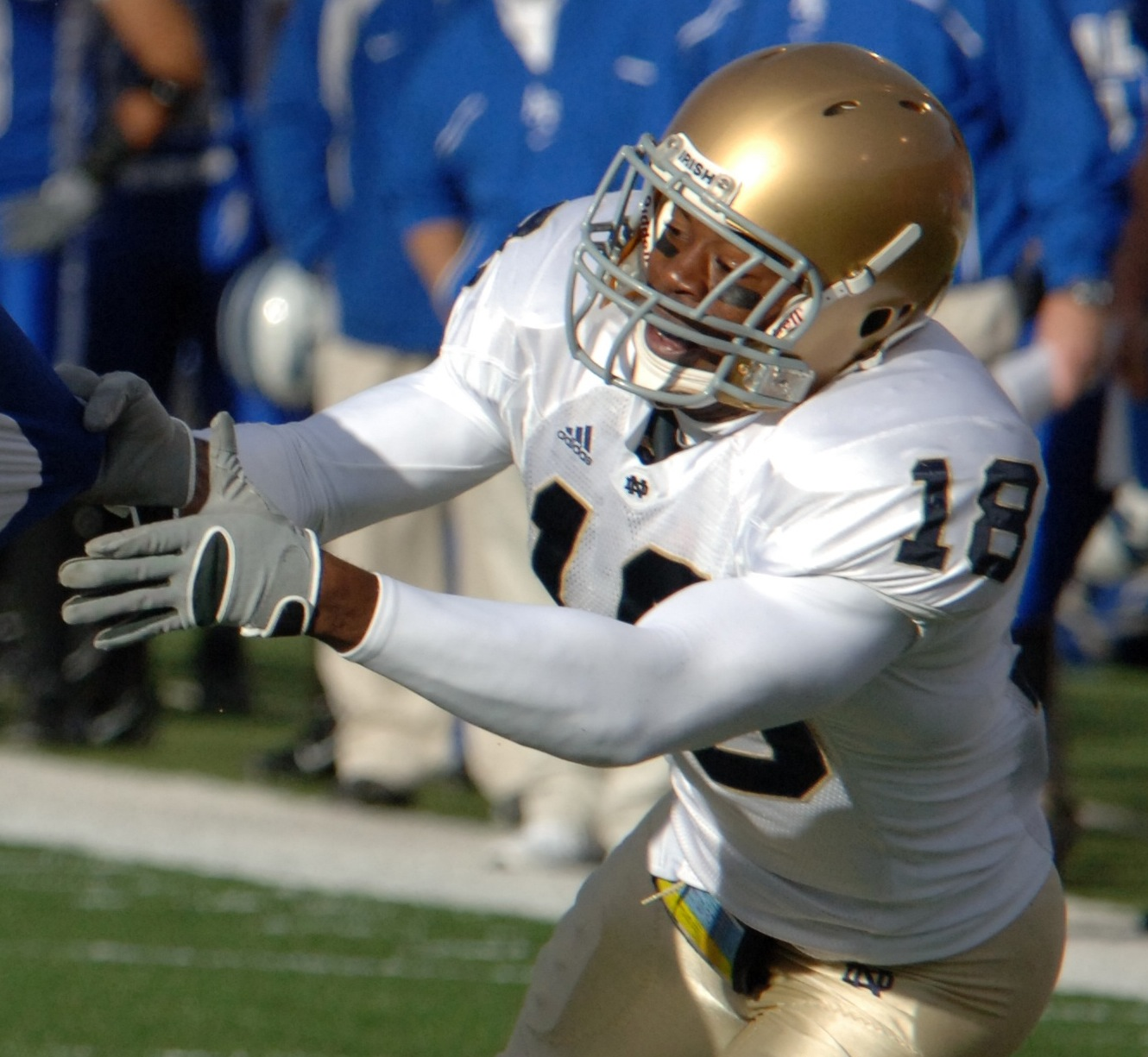
- Ndukwe with Notre Dame in 2006

No. 41, 44
- Position: Safety

Personal information
- Born: March 4, 1985 (age 41); Charlottesville, Virginia, U.S.
- Listed height: 6 ft 2 in (1.88 m)
- Listed weight: 224 lb (102 kg)

Career information
- High school: Dublin (OH) Coffman
- College: Notre Dame
- NFL draft: 2007: 7th round, 253rd overall pick

Career history
- Cincinnati Bengals (2007–2010); Oakland Raiders (2011)

Career NFL statistics
- Total tackles: 260
- Sacks: 7.5
- Forced fumbles: 2
- Fumble recoveries: 3
- Interceptions: 7
- Defensive touchdowns: 2
- Stats at Pro Football Reference

Chinedum "Nedu" Ndukwe // (/ˈtʃɪnəduːm ənˈduːkweɪ/ CHIN-ə-doom ən-DOO-kway; born March 4, 1985) is an American former professional football player who was a safety in the National Football League (NFL). He was selected by the Cincinnati Bengals in the seventh round of the 2007 NFL draft. He played college football for the Notre Dame Fighting Irish. He also played for the Oakland Raiders.

== College career ==
After graduating from Dublin Coffman High School, Ndukwe went on to start at safety for the University of Notre Dame for his junior and senior seasons. He played in 46 games with 25 starts and made 157 tackles.

During his tenure at Notre Dame, his fellow Dublin Coffman graduate, Brady Quinn, was his roommate. Ndukwe had a double major in marketing and psychology.

== Professional career ==
=== Cincinnati Bengals ===
Ndukwe was selected by the Cincinnati Bengals in the seventh round (253rd overall) of the 2007 NFL draft. Ndukwe made an immediate impact by playing in 14 games and starting two in place of an injured Dexter Jackson at strong safety. Ndukwe finished the season with 35 tackles, two sacks, three interceptions, six pass deflections, a fumble recovery that he returned for a touchdown, and one forced fumble. He finished the season one of four Bengals to log an entry in every statistical column on the defensive stat sheet for the season. Ndukwe missed the second and third games of the season due to a hamstring injury suffered against the Baltimore Ravens. In a December 23 contest against the Cleveland Browns, Ndukwe totaled two interceptions off quarterback Derek Anderson. His first interception was returned 44 yards to the five-yard line, setting up a Bengals' score. His next interception came off of a pass intended for tight end Kellen Winslow that Ndukwe grabbed in the end zone. He also recorded 12 tackles, which was second-best on the team. In a November game against the Ravens, Ndukwe intercepted a Kyle Boller pass in the end zone in the fourth quarter.

In the season finale against the Miami Dolphins, Ndukwe returned a fumble 54 yards for a touchdown that put the Bengals ahead 28-10 in the fourth quarter. After the touchdown, excited commentator Joe Woeste claimed Ndukwe was a future Hall of Famer. He was competing with Dexter Jackson for the starting safety role; however, in 2009 the Bengals cut Jackson, leaving Ndukwe as the starting strong safety.

He became a free agent after the 2010 season.

=== Oakland Raiders ===
After rehabbing a knee injury for 10 months, the Oakland Raiders signed Ndukwe on October 18, 2011. He played in two games with one interception before aggravating the original injury, ending his comeback and his season on November 10.

== NFL career statistics ==
Legend
| | Led the league |
| **Bold** | Career high |

=== Regular season ===
| Year | Team | Games | | Tackles | | | | | Interceptions | | | | | Fumbles | | | |
| Year | Team | GP | GS | Cmb | Solo | Ast | Sck | TFL | Int | Yds | TD | Lng | PD | FF | FR | Yds | TD |
|---|---|---|---|---|---|---|---|---|---|---|---|---|---|---|---|---|---|
| 2007 | CIN | 14 | 2 | 45 | 35 | 10 | 2.0 | 1 | **3** | **44** | 0 | **44** | **6** | **2** | **1** | **54** | **1** |
| 2008 | CIN | 11 | 11 | 64 | 43 | 21 | **3.0** | **5** | 1 | 12 | 0 | 12 | 4 | 0 | **1** | 15 | **1** |
| 2009 | CIN | **16** | **12** | **89** | **63** | **26** | 2.0 | 4 | 1 | 9 | 0 | 9 | 5 | 0 | 0 | 0 | 0 |
| 2010 | CIN | 12 | 6 | 60 | 41 | 19 | 0.5 | 1 | 1 | 0 | 0 | 0 | 3 | 0 | **1** | 0 | 0 |
| 2011 | OAK | 2 | 0 | 2 | 2 | 0 | 0.0 | 0 | 1 | 0 | 0 | 0 | 1 | 0 | 0 | 0 | 0 |
| | | 55 | 31 | 260 | 184 | 76 | 7.5 | 11 | 7 | 65 | 0 | 44 | 19 | 2 | 3 | 69 | 2 |

=== Playoffs ===
| Year | Team | Games | | Tackles | | | | | Interceptions | | | | | Fumbles | | | |
| Year | Team | GP | GS | Cmb | Solo | Ast | Sck | TFL | Int | Yds | TD | Lng | PD | FF | FR | Yds | TD |
|---|---|---|---|---|---|---|---|---|---|---|---|---|---|---|---|---|---|
| 2009 | CIN | **1** | **1** | **6** | **3** | **3** | 0.0 | 0 | 0 | 0 | 0 | 0 | 0 | 0 | 0 | 0 | 0 |
| | | 1 | 1 | 6 | 3 | 3 | 0.0 | 0 | 0 | 0 | 0 | 0 | 0 | 0 | 0 | 0 | 0 |

== Personal ==
Ndukwe's name Chinedum means "God is my guiding light" in Igbo.

In 2008, Ndukwe attended the Harvard Business School, followed by the Wharton School of Business at the University of Pennsylvania in 2009 for the NFL Business Management Program.

On January 30, 2012, Ndukwe made his voiceover debut, working for NFL Films as the narrator for ESPN's Hey Rookie.

Ndukwe is the youngest of three sons; his oldest brother Kelechi is commanding officer of USS Halsey, who previously served on the Minesweeper Crew SWERVE, based in San Diego, as the executive officer and later commanding officer of USS Devastator in Manama, Bahrain. The middle brother, Ikechukwu, was an offensive tackle in the NFL. The youngest sibling, Ezinne, earned her masters in public health at the University of Michigan.

He founded the Cincinnati-based Kingsley + Co., a commercial real estate company.
