= Geoff Price =

American football player (born 1984)

Geoffrey Price

No. 17
- Position: Punter

Personal information
- Born: August 29, 1984 (age 42); Chicago, Illinois
- Listed height: 6 ft 3 in (1.91 m)
- Listed weight: 196 lb (89 kg)

Career information
- High school: Colleyville Heritage (Colleyville, Texas)
- College: Notre Dame Fighting Irish (2004–2007)

Geoffrey Scott Price (born August 29, 1984) was an American football punter for the University of Notre Dame football team. Price graduated from Heritage High School in Colleyville, Texas, and completed a degree in finance in May 2007. He is 6'3" tall and weighs in at 196 pounds.

== Career ==
=== High school ===
Price was named to the Big XII All-Region Super Team as punter. His junior year, he averaged 45.6 yards per punt, which dropped to 39.5 yards per punt his senior year because of an ankle injury. He set a school record with his career-long 74 yard punt, and also played free safety on defense with 101 stops and two interceptions. He was also a member of both the National Honor Society and the Fellowship of Christian Athletes.

=== College ===
Price had seen little playing time as reserve punter at Notre Dame, playing in only two games his sophomore year and seeing no action both his freshman and junior years. In his senior year however, he took over for D.J. Fitzpatrick, and had high expectations. He was ranked fifth in the NCAA in punting, thanks in part to a strong performance against Penn State in a 41–17 victory. For the 2006 season, Price had an average of 48 yards per punt, including a career-long 62-yard kick. He was named a semifinalist for the Ray Guy Award in 2006.
