= Brady Quinn =

American football player (born 1984)

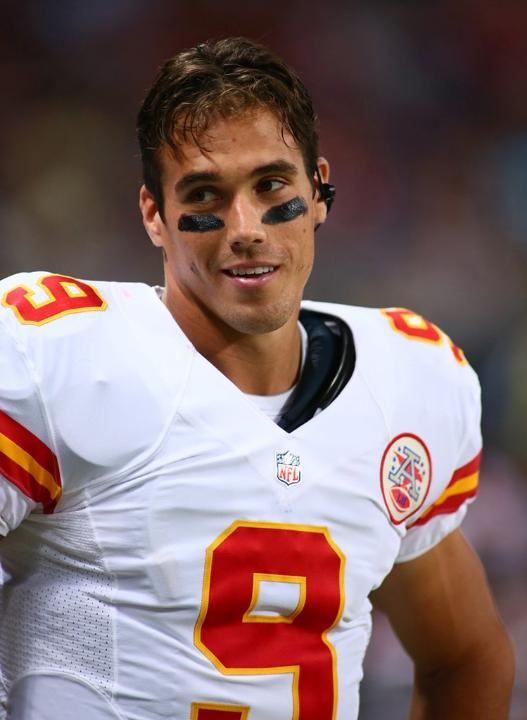
- Quinn with the Kansas City Chiefs in 2012

No. 10, 9
- Position: Quarterback

Personal information
- Born: October 27, 1984 (age 42); Columbus, Ohio, U.S.
- Listed height: 6 ft 4 in (1.93 m)
- Listed weight: 235 lb (107 kg)

Career information
- High school: Dublin Coffman (Dublin, Ohio)
- College: Notre Dame (2003–2006)
- NFL draft: 2007: 1st round, 22nd overall pick

Career history
- Cleveland Browns (2007–2009); Denver Broncos (2010–2011); Kansas City Chiefs (2012); Seattle Seahawks (2013)*; New York Jets (2013); St. Louis Rams (2013); Miami Dolphins (2014)*
- * Offseason or practice squad member only

Awards and highlights
- Maxwell Award (2006); Johnny Unitas Golden Arm Award (2006); Sammy Baugh Trophy (2005); Cingular All-America Player of the Year (2006); Second-team All-American (2006); Third-team All-American (2005)

Career NFL statistics
- Passing attempts: 550
- Passing completions: 296
- Completion percentage: 53.8%
- TD–INT: 12–17
- Passing yards: 3,043
- Passer rating: 64.4
- Stats at Pro Football Reference

Brayden Tyler Quinn (born October 27, 1984) is an American former professional football player who was a quarterback in the National Football League (NFL) for seven seasons. He played college football for the Notre Dame Fighting Irish, winning the Maxwell Award. Quinn was selected by the Cleveland Browns in the first round of the 2007 NFL draft. Following three seasons in Cleveland, he was traded to the Denver Broncos, where he played for two seasons. Quinn spent his last three seasons with the Kansas City Chiefs, the New York Jets, and the St. Louis Rams for one year each.

== Early life ==
Quinn was born on October 27, 1984, in Columbus, Ohio, the middle child of Tyrone J. Quinn and Robin D. (née Slates) Quinn. He has an older sister, Laura Quinn, who is married to former NFL and Ohio State linebacker A. J. Hawk, and a younger sister, Kelly Katherine Quinn, who is married to NHL defenseman Jack Johnson.

Quinn attended Dublin Coffman High School in Dublin, Ohio, and ranked sixth on the Detroit Free Press "Best of the Midwest" team and was listed at number 20 on ESPN's list of the nation's top 100 prospects.

As a junior in 2001, Quinn threw for 2,200 yards and 21 touchdowns to go along with 15 interceptions, posting a 9–4 record and helped lead Coffman to the Division I state semi-finals. As a senior in 2002, he threw for 2,149 yards, threw 25 touchdowns with four interceptions, and completed 143 of 258 pass attempts, and rushed for 108 yards and six touchdowns. Quinn helped his team post an 8–3 record and played in the U.S. Army All-American Bowl in San Antonio, Texas. Quinn was named the Columbus Dispatch and Ohio Capital Conference Offensive Player of the Year and was an All-State choice. Quinn was named an All-Conference player in baseball as a junior and lettered three times and was a part of the 2001 State Championship team. He was a member of Young Life, the Rock Solid Club, and Who's Who Among America High School Students.

In the fall of 2002, Quinn received a scholarship from the University of Notre Dame, acting on a tip from fellow recruit Chinedum Ndukwe's father.

== College career ==
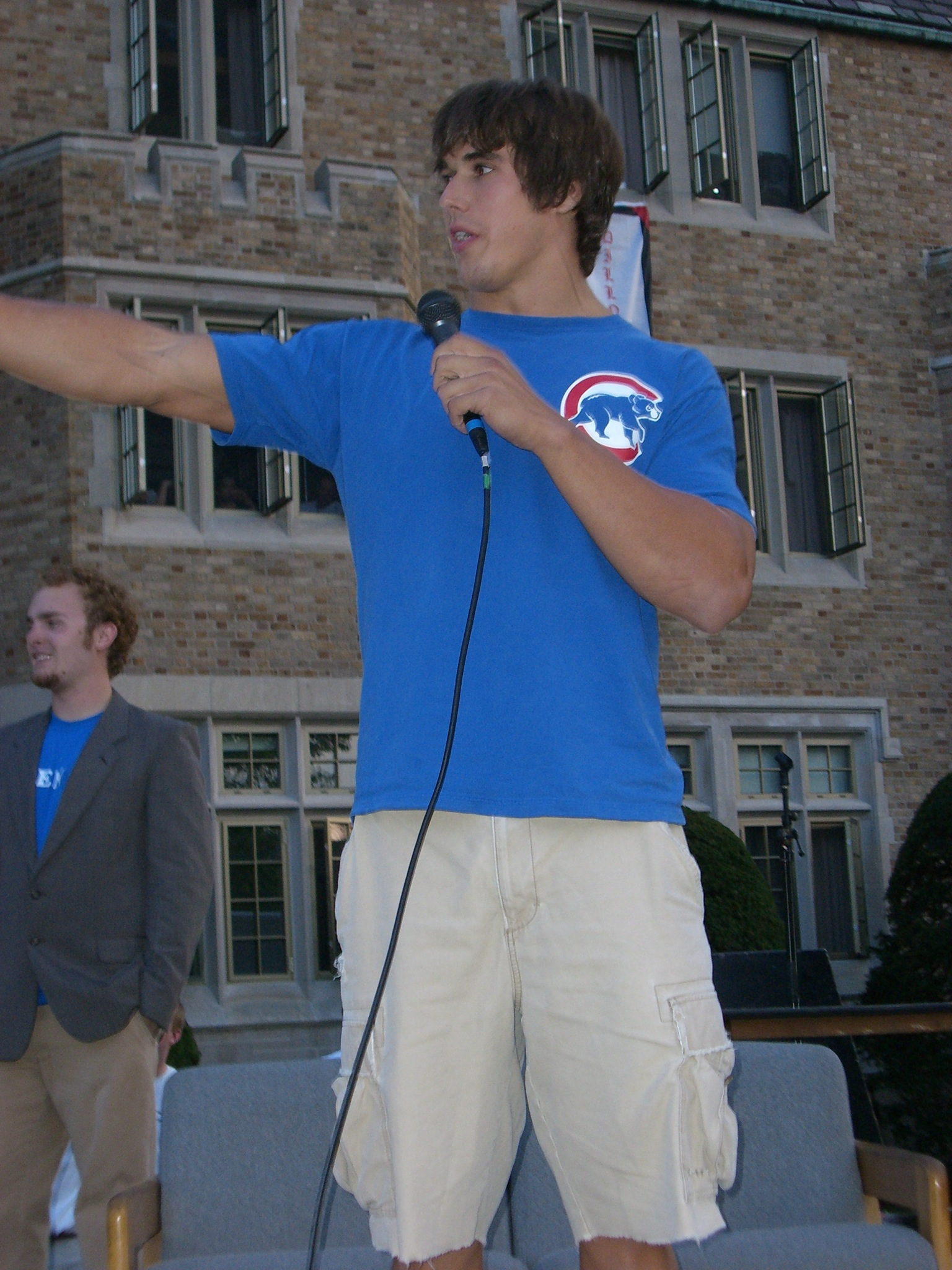
Quinn at a pep rally during his time at Notre Dame

Quinn accepted the offer to attend Notre Dame, where he set 36 Fighting Irish records during his four seasons with the team. There were ten career records, twelve single-season records, four single-game records and ten miscellaneous records broken by Quinn throughout those four years, including the record for career pass attempts with 1,602; completions with 929; yards-per-game with 239.6; touchdown passes with 95, and the Irish's lowest interception percentage with 2.43. Quinn won 29 games as a starter at Notre Dame, tied with Ron Powlus and Tom Clements for the second most in school history.

In 2005, under Notre Dame's new head coach Charlie Weis, Quinn excelled as a starting quarterback, averaging 110 more passing yards per game than he had as a sophomore while increasing his number of touchdown passes from 17 in 2004 to 32 in 2005. Quinn was named to the 2005 AP All-America Team as a third-team quarterback and the 2006 SI.com All-American Team as a second-team quarterback. Quinn received the Sammy Baugh Trophy as the nation's top passer of the 2005 season. At the end of the season, Notre Dame faced Ohio State in the Fiesta Bowl. Quinn had 29 completions in 45 pass attempts for 286 yards in a 34–20 loss to Ohio State.

Prior to the start of the 2006 college football season, Quinn was featured in a regional cover on the August 22, 2006 issue of Sports Illustrated's 2006 College Football Preview issue along with then-teammates Tom Zbikowski and Travis Thomas with the caption "Notre Dame: The Battle For No. 1." Quinn finished the season with 3,426 yards on 289 completions out of 467 attempts for a completion percentage of 61.9% and 7.34 yards per attempt. He threw 37 touchdowns to only 7 interceptions, and was sacked 31 times. Quinn finished the regular season with a passing efficiency rating of 146.65, which ranked him 18th in the country. Notre Dame was invited to the 2007 Sugar Bowl on January 3, 2007, where they played LSU. Quinn was held to 148 passing yards. Quinn threw two touchdown passes, both in the first half, and LSU held Notre Dame scoreless through the second half of the game to defeat the Fighting Irish 41–14.

Following the 2006 season, Quinn won several awards, including the Johnny Unitas Golden Arm Award for the best college quarterback in the nation and the Maxwell Award for the best college football player. He was named the Cingular All-America Player of the Year and was named to the 2006 AP All-America Team as a second-team quarterback. Quinn graduated from Notre Dame with dual degrees in political science and finance.

== Professional career ==
=== Pre-draft ===
Pre-draft measurables
Height	Weight	Arm length	Hand span	40-yard dash	10-yard split	20-yard split	20-yard shuttle	Three-cone drill	Vertical jump	Broad jump	Bench press	Wonderlic
6 ft 3 3/4 in (1.92 m)	232 lb (105 kg)	32 1/2 in (0.83 m)	10 1/4 in (0.26 m)	4.73 s	1.62 s	2.75 s	4.22 s	6.79 s	36 in (0.91 m)	9 ft 7 in (2.92 m)	24 reps	29
All values from NFL Combine/Notre Dame Pro Day

Coming into the draft Quinn was considered to be one of the top players in the country, and was invited to the draft. Before the draft started, Quinn was labeled as a "franchise quarterback in the mold of Carson Palmer." He was projected to be picked in the top ten and even could have been the number one overall pick.

=== Cleveland Browns ===
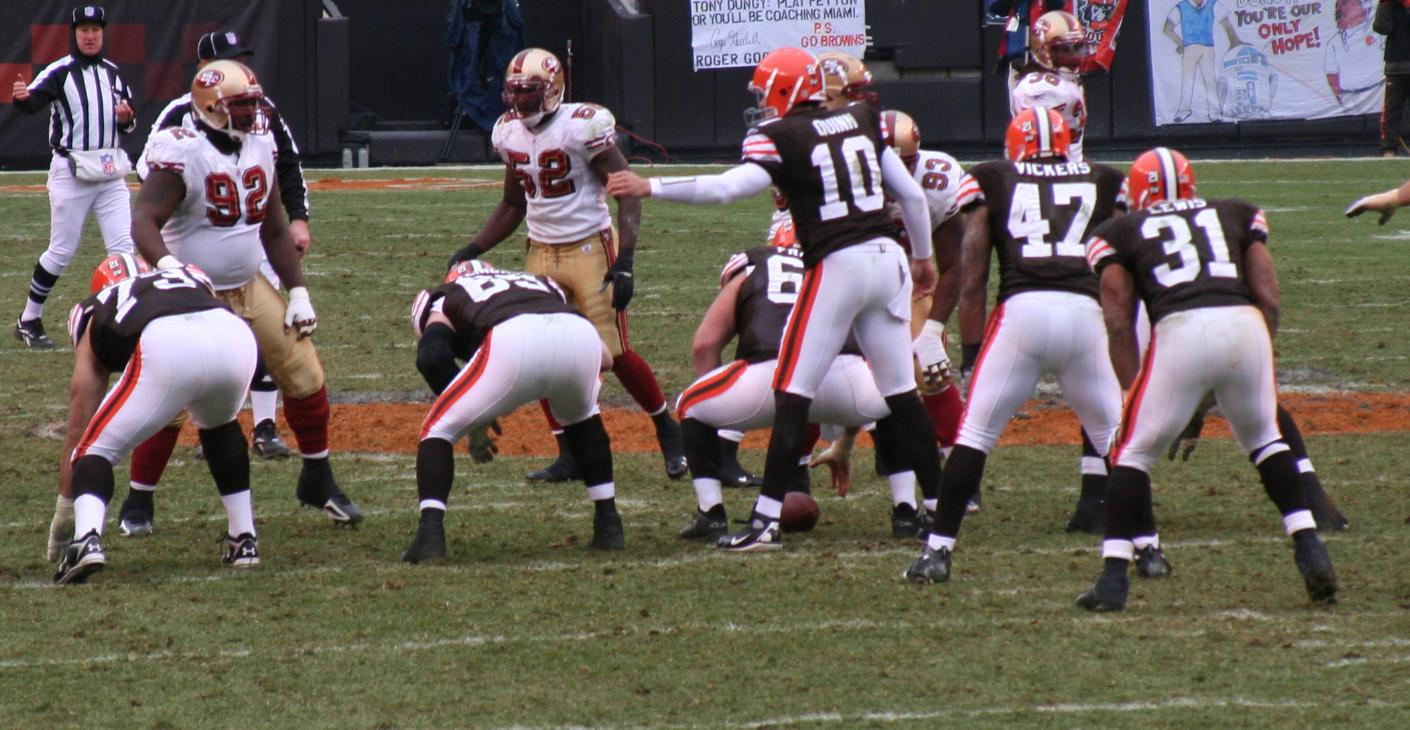
Quinn's NFL debut as a Brown

==== 2007 ====
While some suspected the Cleveland Browns would select Quinn with the third pick, he fell to the 22nd pick in the draft before being picked by the Browns. Quinn signed a five-year deal with the Browns worth a reported $20.2 million, with $7.5 million guaranteed and up to $30 million in incentives. Quinn was originally placed third on the Browns' depth chart behind Charlie Frye and Derek Anderson. However, after a 34–7 defeat to the Pittsburgh Steelers in Week 1, Frye was traded to the Seattle Seahawks in exchange for a sixth round draft pick, moving Quinn to second on the Browns' depth chart. On December 30, 2007, when Anderson hurt his pinky and wrist, Quinn made his official NFL debut in the Browns' final game of the season against the San Francisco 49ers. Going 3-for-8 passing, Quinn led the Browns to a field goal. Despite speculation that the Browns would trade Anderson to get back into the first round of the 2008 NFL draft, Browns' general manager Phil Savage later stated that he hoped to sign Anderson, and keep both quarterbacks for the 2008 season.

==== 2008 ====
After leading the Browns to a 10–5 record, Derek Anderson was named the starting quarterback for the 2008 season, leaving Quinn on the sidelines once again. After a mediocre 3–5 start by the team, however, head coach Romeo Crennel named Quinn the starting quarterback for the Browns' upcoming game against the Denver Broncos. Though he played well, and helped the Browns build a two-touchdown lead into the third quarter, the Broncos rallied back to win, causing Quinn's first official start to end in a loss. Nonetheless, he went on to win the next game against the Buffalo Bills, but he broke his right index finger on his throwing hand during the victory, and though he tried to play through it during the next game against the Houston Texans, he announced on November 25 that he would have surgery, sidelining him for the rest of the 2008 season.

==== 2009 ====
Soon after the season was over, Romeo Crennel was fired as head coach and was replaced by former New York Jets coach Eric Mangini, who was unsure of who would be the Browns's starting quarterback. Thus, a competition for the starting job between Quinn and Anderson occurred throughout the offseason. Four days before the Browns's 2009 opener, it was announced that Quinn would be the starter. Quinn continued to be the Browns' starter until Week 3 against the Baltimore Ravens, when he was benched at halftime in favor of Anderson. The following week, Mangini named Anderson the starter. Quinn did not play again until Week 8, when he was brought in with three minutes to go in a 30–6 loss against the Chicago Bears. As the Browns headed into their bye week, it was not indicated who would be the starting quarterback for the rest of the season. It was announced five days before their Week 10 Monday Night Football game against the Ravens, that Quinn was once again being awarded the starting quarterback position. Though he struggled in his first game back, as the Browns were shut out 16–0, Quinn followed it up in Week 11 with his best professional outing yet, throwing for 304 yards with four touchdowns against the Detroit Lions. Quinn set a record for the Browns that day, becoming the only QB in franchise history to throw three touchdowns in one quarter. The Browns later defeated the rival Pittsburgh Steelers knocking them out of playoff contention, Quinn's first win of 2009 as the starting quarterback. The next week the Browns defeated the Kansas City Chiefs 41–34, despite Quinn suffering a Lisfranc injury during the game. On December 22, the Browns placed Quinn on injured reserve for the last two games of the regular season.

=== Denver Broncos ===
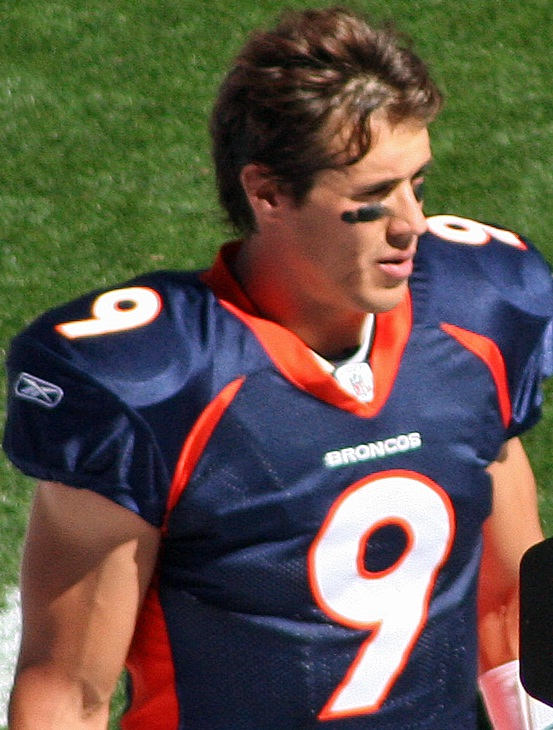
Quinn with the Broncos in September 2010

On March 14, 2010, Quinn was traded to the Denver Broncos in exchange for Peyton Hillis, a 6th round pick in the 2011 NFL draft, and a conditional late-round pick in the 2012 NFL draft. Quinn competed against Broncos incumbent Kyle Orton for the starting job. He began the regular season second on the depth chart, behind Orton, and did not play in any game in 2010.

In August 2011, Quinn was placed second on the depth chart, behind Orton for a single game against the Buffalo Bills in the preseason. In Week 5, Tim Tebow entered the game against the San Diego Chargers at half time in place of Orton, and Tebow started every remaining Broncos game, with Quinn remaining on the bench. In two seasons with the Broncos, Quinn did not play in any games.

=== Kansas City Chiefs ===
Quinn signed with the Kansas City Chiefs on March 17, 2012. After competing for a backup quarterback spot, Quinn beat Ricky Stanzi for the spot and Stanzi was cut on August 27. He then made his Kansas City debut against the Baltimore Ravens on October 7, after Matt Cassel suffered a concussion. On October 11, Cassel was ruled out for Week 6 game against the Tampa Bay Buccaneers, and Quinn got his first start as a Chief. Following that game, Quinn was announced as the starter by head coach Romeo Crennel for the team's October 28 game against the Oakland Raiders. After playing less than a quarter, Quinn left that game with a concussion. Cassel returned to the game and started the games following. Quinn replaced Cassel at half in the team's November 15 game against the Cincinnati Bengals and was awarded the starting job once again.

=== Seattle Seahawks ===
On April 11, 2013, Quinn signed with the Seattle Seahawks as the backup quarterback to Russell Wilson. He was released on August 31, during final roster cuts. Quinn had battled all preseason with Tarvaris Jackson for the backup job.

=== New York Jets ===
Quinn was signed by the New York Jets on September 2, 2013, but was released five days later. He was re-signed by New York on September 9. Quinn was released by the Jets on October 21.

=== St. Louis Rams ===
Quinn was signed by the Rams on October 23, 2013, to back up Kellen Clemens after starter Sam Bradford suffered a torn ACL. Quinn herniated two discs in his back in the weight room the second week he was with the team and would never see the field. Quinn was placed on injured reserve for the final four weeks of the 2013 season and would later get surgery.

=== Miami Dolphins ===
Quinn had initially not planned to play during the 2014 season and signed on to be a rotating color commentator for the NFL on Fox, but his contract featured a clause that allowed him to leave to play in the NFL. Quinn signed with the Miami Dolphins on August 11, 2014, just a few days after signing his television contract. The Dolphins released Quinn on August 26, as a part of roster cuts ahead of the regular season.

=== 2015 NFL Veteran Combine ===
After not playing football for a year, Quinn participated in the first NFL Veteran Combine in 2015.

== Career statistics ==
Legend
**Bold**	Career high

=== NFL ===
Year	Team	GP	GS	Passing							
Year	Team	GP	GS	Cmp	Att	Pct	Yds	Avg	TD	Int	Rtg
2007	CLE	1	0	3	8	37.5	45	5.6	0	0	56.8
2008	CLE	3	3	45	89	50.6	518	**5.8**	2	2	66.6
2009	CLE	10	9	**136**	**256**	53.1	**1,339**	5.2	**8**	7	**67.2**
2010	DEN	DNP									
2011	DEN	DNP									
2012	KC	10	8	112	197	**56.9**	1,141	**5.8**	2	**8**	60.1
2013	NYJ	DNP									
2013	STL	DNP									
Career		24	20	296	550	53.8	3,043	5.5	12	17	64.4

=== College ===
Season	Team	Games			Passing								Rushing			
Season	Team	GP	GS	Record	Cmp	Att	Pct	Yds	Avg	TD	Int	Rate	Att	Yds	Avg	TD
2003	Notre Dame	12	9	4–5	157	332	47.3	1,831	5.5	9	**15**	93.5	48	25	0.5	0
2004	Notre Dame	12	12	6–6	191	353	54.1	2,586	7.3	17	10	125.9	54	−4	−0.1	**3**
2005	Notre Dame	12	12	9–3	**292**	450	**64.9**	**3,919**	**8.7**	32	7	**158.4**	70	**90**	**1.3**	1
2006	Notre Dame	13	13	**10–3**	289	**467**	61.9	3,426	7.3	**37**	7	146.6	**82**	71	0.9	2
Totals		49	46	29–17	929	1,602	57.9	11,762	7.3	95	39	134.4	254	182	0.7	6

== Career highlights ==
- Maxwell Award (2006)
- Johnny Unitas Golden Arm Award (2006)
- Sammy Baugh Trophy (2005)
- Cingular All-America Player of the Year (2006)
- Second-team All-American (2006)
- Third-team All-American (2005)
- AFC Offensive Player of the Week (2012, Week 13)

== Analyst career ==
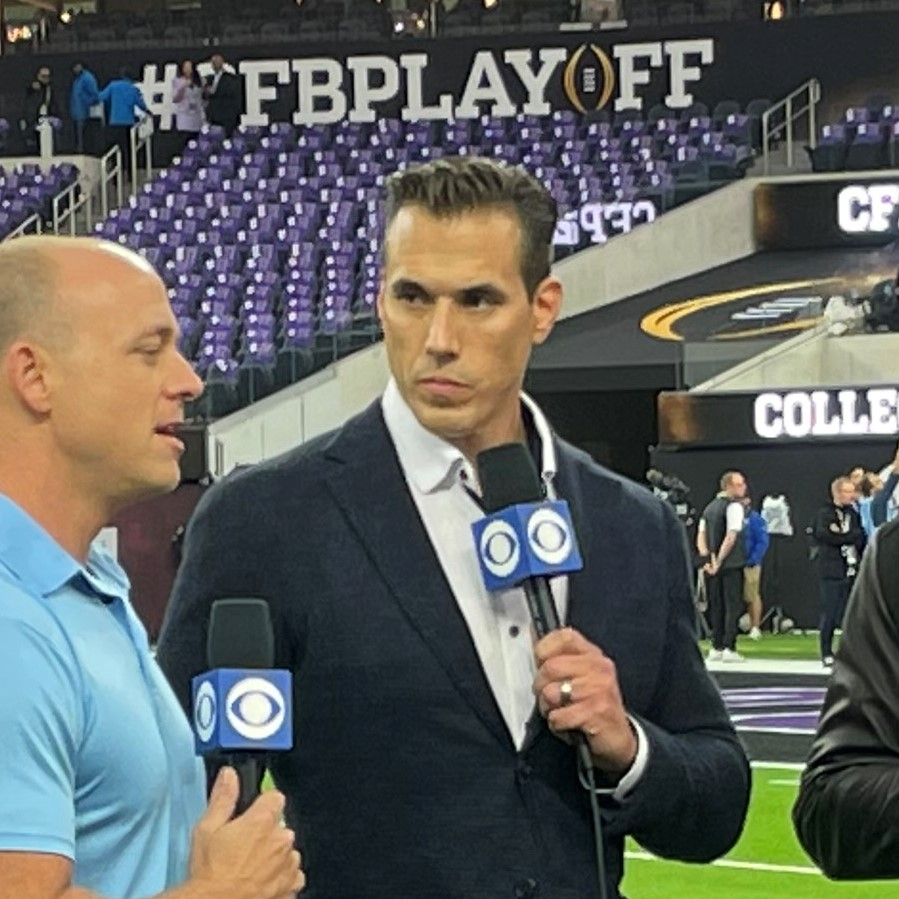
Quinn on the sidelines of the 2023 College Football Playoff National Championship.

Quinn has served as a college football analyst for Big Noon Kickoff on Fox since August 2019, alongside host Rob Stone and analysts Reggie Bush, Matt Leinart, and Bob Stoops. He also serves as a color analyst for FOX's NFL, CFB, and XFL games.

In May 2021, Quinn began co-hosting FOX Sports Radio's weekday morning drive show Outkick The Coverage with Jonas Knox. On September 20, 2021, "Outkick" was rebranded as "2 Pros and a Cup of Joe" with Brady Quinn, LaVar Arrington, and Jonas Knox as co-hosts.

Quinn is also a college football and NFL analyst for CBS Sports HQ throughout the year and makes weekly appearances on the “PickSix Podcast.”

Quinn is a co-host of the “Blitz” on Sirius XM NFL Radio on Monday, Tuesday and Wednesday with host Bruce Murray.

== Personal life ==
Quinn began dating USA Olympic gymnast Alicia Sacramone in 2009. They announced their engagement in August 2013 and were married in March 2014. The couple has five children together: three daughters (Sloan, b. 2016; Teagan, b. 2018; and Cassidy, b. 2020) and two sons (Cavanaugh, b. 2023; and Cade, b. 2025).

Quinn founded a charity, 3rd and Goal Foundation, in 2011. The foundation has three missions, Operation Home – making homes handicap-accessible for wounded veterans, Operation Joy – providing gifts to those military families in need and Operation Education – Providing educational platforms to help those veterans transitioning from their service to start, continue, or finish their education. He and his wife are co-chairs of the foundation.

Quinn is an avid Kentucky basketball fan.

Quinn's cousin is actor Zachery Ty Bryan. Quinn's sisters are married to retired NFL player A. J. Hawk and retired NHL player Jack Johnson.

== See also ==
- List of Division I FBS passing yardage leaders
