= USS Halsey =

Two ships of the United States Navy have been named USS Halsey in honor of Fleet Admiral William F. "Bull" Halsey (1882–1959), who served in the United States Navy during the First and Second World Wars. Both ships used guided missiles as their primary armament

- The first, USS Halsey (DLG-23), was a Leahy-class guided missile cruiser that served in the United States Navy from 1963 to 1994.
- The second, USS Halsey (DDG-97), is the 47th Arleigh Burke-class guided missile destroyer, launched in 2004. In active service.

== See also ==
- USS Halsey Powell (DD-686), Fletcher-class destroyer, launched in 1943, scrapped in 1982
- USS Delbert W. Halsey (DE-310), destroyer escort launched in 1944 but never completed
