= Kyle McCarthy (American football) =

American football player (born 1986)

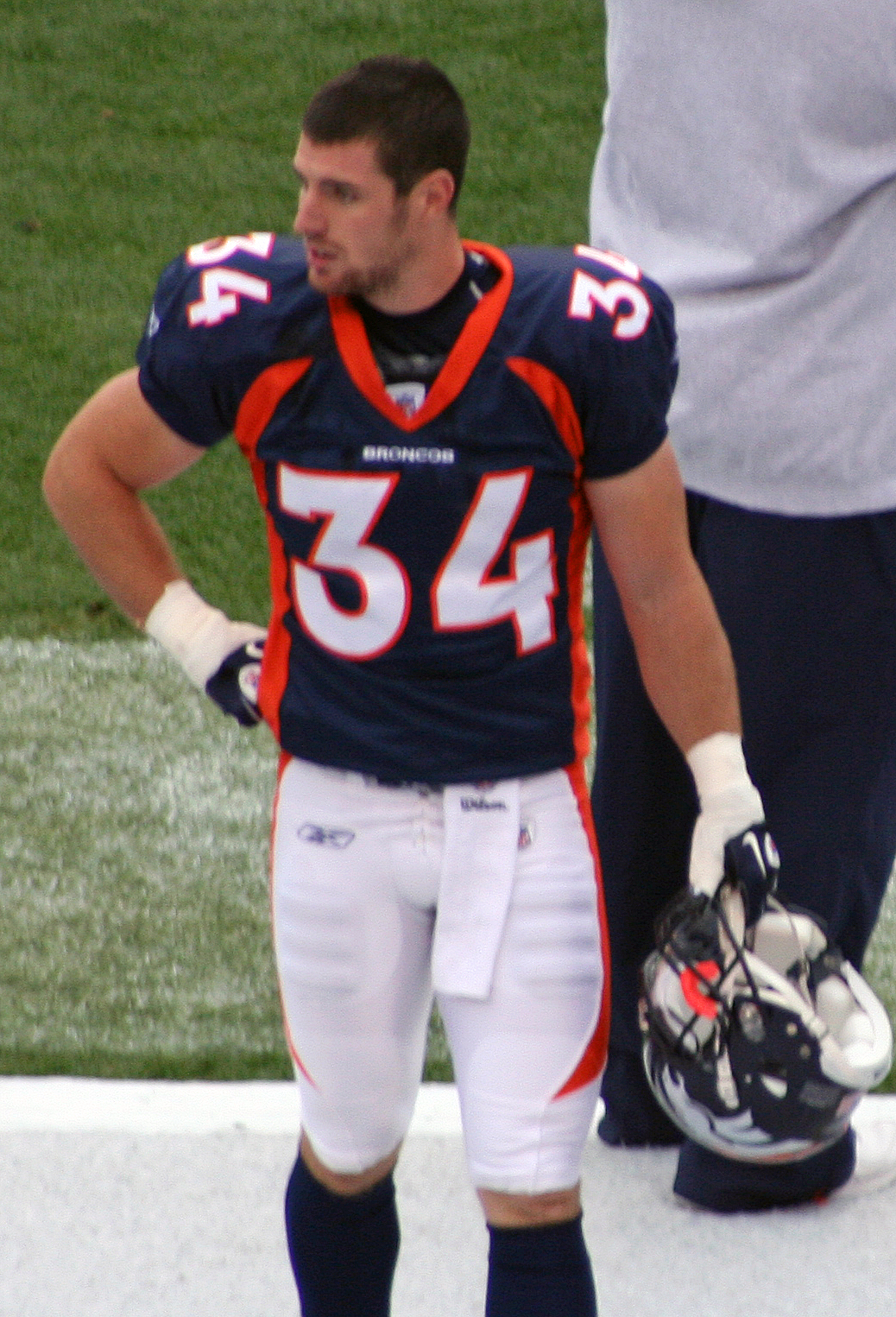
- McCarthy in October 2010

No. 34, 41
- Position: Safety

Personal information
- Born: September 30, 1986 (age 40); Youngstown, Ohio, U.S.
- Listed height: 6 ft 1 in (1.85 m)
- Listed weight: 205 lb (93 kg)

Career information
- High school: Mooney (Youngstown)
- College: Notre Dame
- NFL draft: 2010: undrafted

Career history

Playing
- Denver Broncos (2010–2011); Kansas City Chiefs (2012); Oakland Raiders (2013)*
- * Offseason or practice squad member only

Coaching
- Kansas (2013) Intern; Notre Dame (2014) Graduate assistant

Career NFL statistics
- Total tackles: 7
- Stats at Pro Football Reference

Kyle Justin McCarthy (born September 30, 1986) is an American former professional football player who was a safety in the National Football League (NFL). He was signed by the Denver Broncos as an undrafted free agent in 2010. He played college football for the Notre Dame Fighting Irish. He was a quarterback at Cardinal Mooney High School in Youngstown, OH where he led his 2004 football team to an OHSAA Division IV State Title.

== High school and college career ==
McCarthy played as a quarterback at Cardinal Mooney High School in Youngstown, Ohio. In 2005, he committed to Notre Dame.

College recruiting (2005)
Name	Hometown	School	Height	Weight	Commit date
Kyle McCarthy; Safety	Youngstown, OH	Cardinal Mooney HS	6 ft 0 in (1.83 m)	172 lb (78 kg)	Jan 23, 2005
Kyle McCarthy; Safety	Recruit ratings: Rivals: 247Sports:				
