= USS Devastator =

USS Devastator may refer to the following ships of the United States Navy:

- USS Devastator (AM-318) was a ship that served during the World War II and Korean War eras.
- USS Devastator (MCM-6) was an Avenger-class mine countermeasures ship commissioned by the US Navy on 6 October 1990.
