= 2006 Fiesta Bowl =

2006 Tostitos Fiesta Bowl
- BCS Bowl Game; 35th Fiesta Bowl
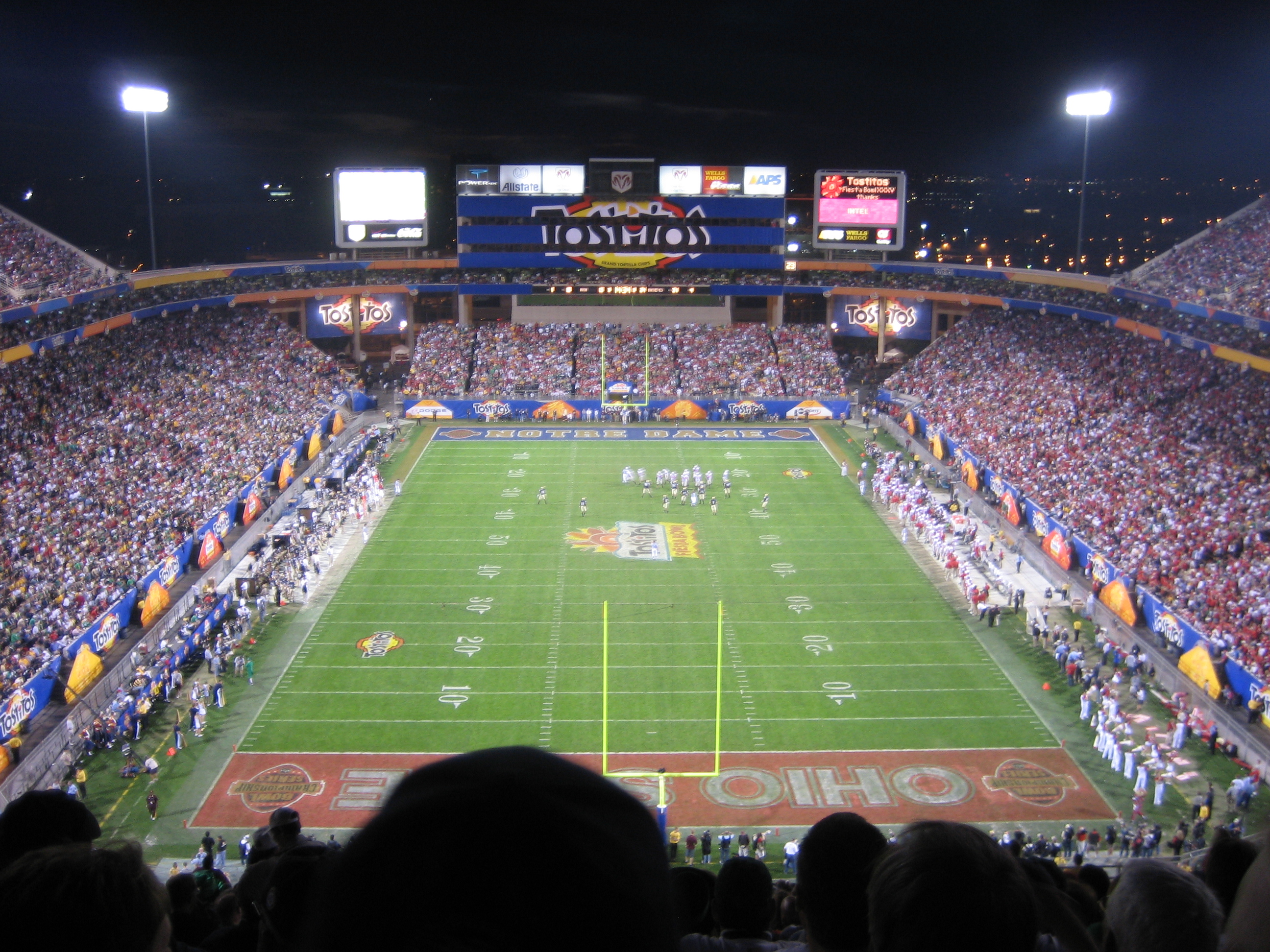
- Sun Devil Stadium in Tempe, Arizona, hosted the Fiesta Bowl for the final time.
Notre Dame Fighting Irish	Ohio State Buckeyes
(9–2)	(9–2)
Independent	Big Ten
20	34
Head coach: Charlie Weis	Head coach: Jim Tressel
AP / Coaches / BCS; 5 / 6 / 6	AP / Coaches / BCS; 4 / 4 / 4
	1	2	3	4	Total
Notre Dame	7	0	6	7	20
Ohio State	7	14	3	10	34
- Date: January 2, 2006
- Season: 2005
- Stadium: Sun Devil Stadium
- Location: Tempe, Arizona
- MVP: QB Troy Smith & LB A. J. Hawk
- Referee: Steve Shaw (SEC)
- Attendance: 76,196

United States TV coverage
- Network: ABC
- Announcers: Brent Musburger, Gary Danielson, Jack Arute
- Nielsen ratings: 20.601 million viewers; 12.9 rating

The 2006 Tostitos Fiesta Bowl, played on January 2, 2006, was the 35th edition of the Fiesta Bowl, sponsored by Frito-Lay through its Tostitos tortilla chip brand. The game featured the Notre Dame Fighting Irish and the Ohio State Buckeyes, and resulted in a 34–20 Ohio State win.

Ohio State quarterback Troy Smith became the frontrunner of the 2006 Heisman race, after he completed 19 of his 28 passes for 342 yards, including 2 touchdowns and no interceptions. Notre Dame's Brady Quinn completed 29 out of his 45 passes for 286 yards.

Notre Dame got the first score of the game, with a 20-yard touchdown run by Darius Walker. Then Ohio State responded on a 6-play, 86-yard drive capped off with a 56-yard touchdown pass to Ted Ginn Jr. In the second quarter, off a wide-receiver reverse, Ginn rushed 68 yards to the left side for a touchdown. Then with just over 2 minutes to go in the half, Troy Smith found Santonio Holmes for an 85-yard touchdown pass, and Ohio State led 21–7 at half-time.

In the second half, Notre Dame scored on Darius Walker's second rushing touchdown of the game, to make the score 21–13 in favor of Ohio State. Notre Dame's defense forced two Ohio State field goals to make the score 27–13. With five minutes left to go in the game, Darius Walker got his third rushing touchdown of the game, bringing the Irish within 27–20. On third and five, with Ohio State using up the clock, the Buckeyes scored on a 60-yard touchdown run by Antonio Pittman to clinch the victory.

== Selection of teams ==
The Fiesta Bowl this season was supposed to choose either the Big 12 Conference champion or the Pacific-10 Conference champion as part of the BCS tie-ins for this season. The Rose Bowl served as the BCS National Championship Game this season, and the Pac-10 conference tie-in moved to the Fiesta Bowl as a result. Unlike the 2001 season, the Fiesta Bowl would not be allowed to match the Big 12 and Pac-10 champions, it could choose only one of them.

However, neither the Big 12 or Pac-10 champions would be available to the Fiesta Bowl in the end, as those teams, the Texas Longhorns and the USC Trojans, would finish in the top 2 of the BCS standings and meet in the Rose Bowl.

None of the other conference champions that earned an automatic bid were available either, as those teams would go to the Orange and Sugar Bowls. The Fiesta Bowl was left to take the 2 teams that earned BCS at-large bids, Ohio State of the Big Ten Conference and independent Notre Dame.
