= D. J. Fitzpatrick =

American gridiron football player (born 1982)

D.J. Fitzpatrick
No. 2
- Position: Punter / Placekicker

Personal information
- Born: November 15, 1982 (age 43); Granger, Indiana, U.S.
- Listed height: 6 ft 2 in (1.88 m)
- Listed weight: 206 lb (93 kg)

Career information
- High school: Marian (Mishawaka, Indiana)
- College: Notre Dame
- NFL draft: 2006: undrafted

Career history
- New York Jets (2006)*; Berlin Thunder (2007); Buffalo Bills (2007–2008)*; Montreal Alouettes (2008)
- * Offseason or practice squad member only

Daniel Joseph Fitzpatrick (born November 15, 1982) is an American former professional football punter and placekicker. He was signed by the New York Jets of the National Football League (NFL) as an undrafted free agent in 2006. He played college football for the Notre Dame Fighting Irish. Fitzpatrick was also a member of the Berlin Thunder, Buffalo Bills, and Montreal Alouettes.

== Early life ==
Fitzpatrick attended Marian High School in Mishawaka, Indiana where he played quarterback, defensive back and kicker. Fitzpatrick was also a captain on the Marian golf team that captured the 2001 Indiana High School Athletic Association state championship.

== College career ==
Fitzpatrick chose to walk-on to the Notre Dame Fighting Irish football team over the South Carolina Gamecocks football team. Prior to his senior season, Fitzpatrick was named a preseason nominee for the Lou Groza Award

== Professional career ==
After going undrafted in the 2006 NFL draft, Fitzpatrick signed as an undrafted free agent with the New York Jets. Fitzpatrick was "imported" on October 31, 2008, for one game, by Montreal Alouettes General Manager Jim Popp to replace kicker, Damon Duval. He was released immediately after the game as Duval recovered quickly.

== Personal life ==
He received an undergraduate and master's degree in Accounting from the Mendoza School of Business at the University of Notre Dame. He later became a Financial Analyst with Goldman Sachs in their West Palm Beach, Florida office. He is now the president of Quality Dining, Inc.
