= 2008 Notre Dame Fighting Irish football team =

American college football season

2008 Notre Dame Fighting Irish football

Hawaii Bowl champion

Hawaii Bowl, W 49–21 vs. Hawaii
- Conference: Independent
- Record: 7–6
- Head coach: Charlie Weis (4th season)
- Offensive coordinator: Michael Haywood (4th season)
- Offensive scheme: Pro-style
- Defensive coordinator: Corwin Brown (2nd season)
- Base defense: 3–4
- MVP: Maurice Crum Jr.
- Captains: Maurice Crum Jr.; David Grimes; David Bruton
- Home stadium: Notre Dame Stadium

2008 NCAA Division I FBS independents football records
	Conf.			Overall
Team	W		L	W		L
Navy		–		8	–	5
Notre Dame		–		7	–	6
Army		–		3	–	9
WKU		–		2	–	10
Rankings from AP Poll

The 2008 Notre Dame Fighting Irish football team was an American football team that represented the University of Notre Dame as an independent during the 2008 NCAA Division I FBS football season. In their fourth year under head coach Charlie Weis, the Irish compiled a 7–6 and outscored opponents by a total of 321 to 288. The Irish started the season 4–1, but went 3–5 in the remaining eight games. The combined 15 losses in 2007 and 2008 was the most for any two-year span in Notre Dame history. Despite speculation the university might fire Weis, it was announced shortly after the conclusion of the regular season that he would remain head coach in 2009.

Notre Dame concluded its season on a positive note, ending their NCAA record nine-game bowl losing streak by beating Hawaii, 49–21, in the Hawaii Bowl. In the process, Notre Dame scored its highest point total of the season, its highest point total ever in a bowl game, and broke eight other bowl records.

The team's statistical leaders included quarterback Jimmy Clausen (3,172 passing yards), running back Armando Allen (585 rushing yards), wide receiver Golden Tate (58 receptions for 1,080 yards), kicker Brandon Walker (81 points, 39 of 39 PAT, 14 of 24 field goals), and defensive back Kyle McCarthy (110 total tackles).

The team played its home games at Notre Dame Stadium in South Bend, Indiana.

== Schedule ==
Date	Time	Opponent	Site	TV	Result	Attendance
September 6	3:30 p.m.	San Diego State	Notre Dame Stadium; Notre Dame, IN	NBC	W 21–13	80,795
September 13	3:30 p.m.	Michigan	Notre Dame Stadium; Notre Dame, IN (rivalry)	NBC	W 35–17	80,795
September 20	3:30 p.m.	at Michigan State	Spartan Stadium; East Lansing, MI (rivalry)	ABC, ESPN	L 7–23	76,366
September 27	3:30 p.m.	Purdue	Notre Dame Stadium; Notre Dame, IN (rivalry)	NBC	W 38–21	80,795
October 4	2:30 p.m.	Stanford	Notre Dame Stadium; Notre Dame, IN (rivalry)	NBC	W 28–21	80,795
October 11	3:30 p.m.	at No. 22 North Carolina	Kenan Memorial Stadium; Chapel Hill, NC (rivalry)	ABC, ESPN2	L 24–29	60,500
October 25	8:00 p.m.	at Washington	Husky Stadium; Seattle, WA	ESPN2	W 33–7	70,437
November 1	2:30 p.m.	Pittsburgh	Notre Dame Stadium; Notre Dame, IN (rivalry)	NBC	L 33–36 ^{4OT}	80,795
November 8	8:00 p.m.	at Boston College	Alumni Stadium; Chestnut Hill, MA (Holy War)	ESPN	L 0–17	44,500
November 15	12:00 p.m.	at Navy	M&T Bank Stadium; Baltimore, MD (rivalry)	CBS	W 27–21	70,932
November 22	2:30 p.m.	Syracuse	Notre Dame Stadium; Notre Dame, IN	NBC	L 23–24	80,795
November 29	8:00 p.m.	at No. 5 USC	Los Angeles Memorial Coliseum; Los Angeles, CA (rivalry)	ESPN	L 3–38	90,689
December 24	8:00 p.m.	at Hawaii	Aloha Stadium; Halawa, HI (Hawaii Bowl)	ESPN	W 49–21	43,487
Rankings from AP Poll released prior to the game; All times are in Eastern time

== Preseason ==
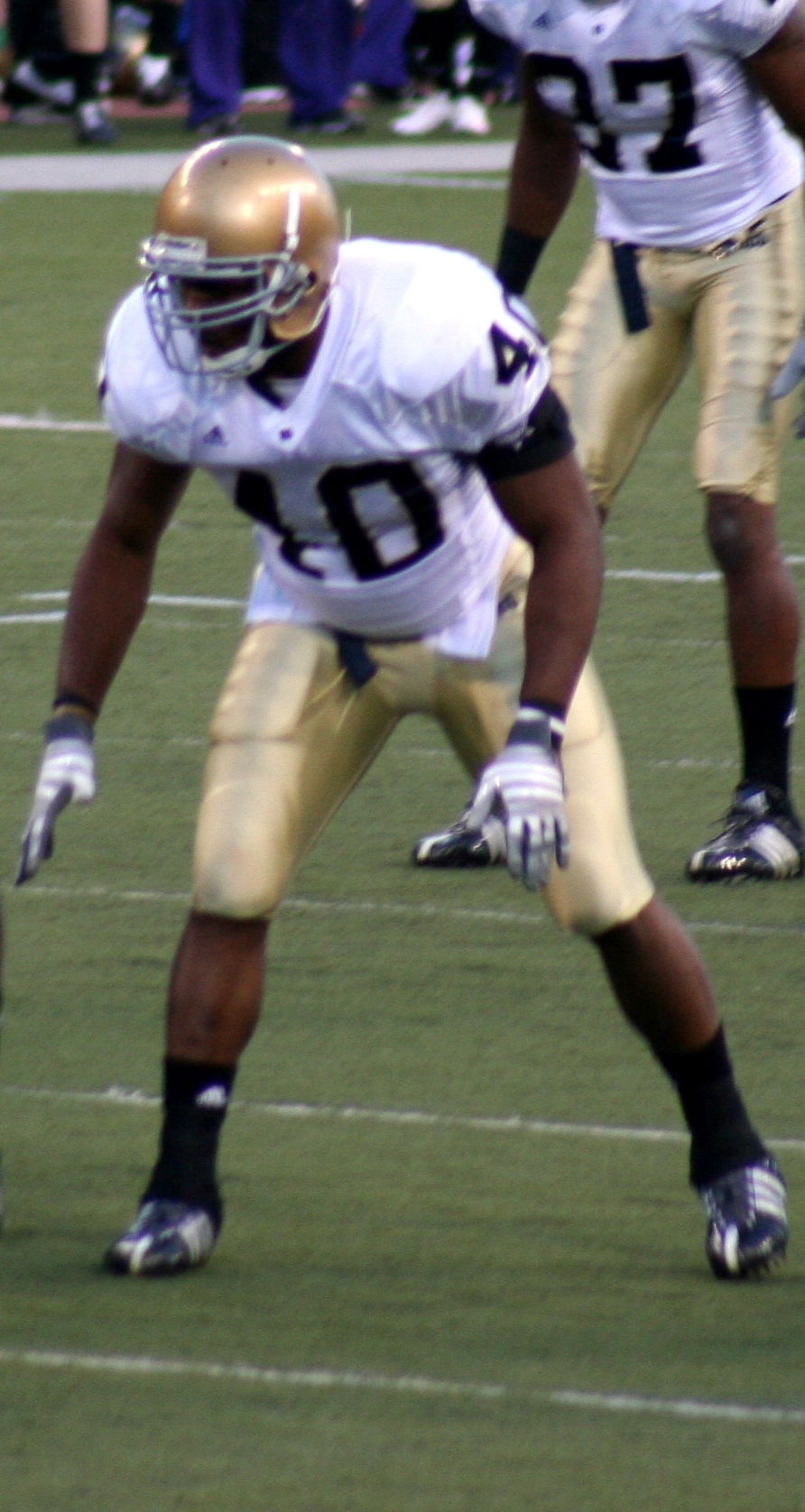
Two-Time Captain Maurice Crum Jr.

=== Coaching changes ===
Despite the turmoil of the previous football season, head coach Charlie Weis did not make many changes to the coaching staff. The one major change to the staff was the addition of Jon Tenuta, former defensive coordinator of the Georgia Tech Yellow Jackets, as the new linebackers coach and assistant head coach. Tetuna became responsible for the day-to-day operations of the team with Weis retaining responsibility only for recruiting. Tenuta's addition followed the retirement of Bill Lewis from active coaching. Other changes included reassignment of football duties. Weis announced that he would be turning over control of the offense, including game day play calling, to offensive coordinator Michael Haywood. On defense, Corwin Brown switched from coaching linebackers to coaching defensive backs following Lewis' retirement. Tenuta assumed coaching the linebackers. Finally, citing the poor play on special teams, Weis made Brian Polian the sole special teams coach and announced that he would be helping Polian when needed. The previous year, all coaches had a hand in helping with special teams.

=== Departed players ===
Seniors tight end John Carlson, defensive end Trevor Laws, safety Tom Zbikowski and center John Sullivan were all drafted by NFL teams. Three players that were not drafted quickly signed with NFL teams as free agents following the NFL Draft: linebacker Joe Brockington, long snapper J. J. Jansen and running back Travis Thomas. Quarterbacks Darrin Bragg and Justin Gillett, defensive end Dwight Stephenson Jr., cornerback Ambrose Wooden and punter Geoff Price also graduated and exhausted their remaining eligibility. Notre Dame also had several players who graduated and decided not to apply for a fifth year of eligibility: running back Junior Jabbie, cornerback Leo Ferine and linebacker Anthony Vernaglia.

=== Transfers ===
After the end of the spring practice session, sophomore-to-be linebacker Aaron Nagel transferred from Notre Dame to the Northwestern Wildcats. In July, wide receiver D.J. Hord announced he was transferring from Notre Dame to a yet unnamed Division I Football Championship Subdivision school, where he would have two years eligibility remaining. Once a highly touted recruit, injuries had hampered his progress, and he left with two catches for seven yards in his Notre Dame career. It was also announced the same day that starting cornerback Darin Walls would not enroll and play football this season for undisclosed personal reasons, but would return the following spring. On August, 15, several days into fall practice, reserve wide receiver Richard Jackson announced he would be leaving Notre Dame for a school closer to his home in Florida.

=== Award candidates ===
The following players were announced to award watch lists prior to the start of the 2008 season:

- David Bruton – Bronko Nagurski Trophy
- Jimmy Clausen – Maxwell Award
- Maurice Crum Jr. – Bronko Nagurski Trophy, Chuck Bednarik Award

== Game summaries ==
=== San Diego State ===
Team	1	2	3	4	Total
San Diego St	0	7	6	0	13
• Notre Dame	0	7	0	14	21

- Date: September 6
- Location: Notre Dame Stadium, South Bend, IN
- Game start: 3:30 p.m. EST

Scoring summary
2	5:32	SDSU	Ryan Lindley 1-yard run (Lane Yoshida kick)	San Diego St 7–0
2	1:14	ND	Michael Floyd 22-yard pass from Jimmy Clausen (Brandon Walker kick)	Tie 7–7
3	8:31	SDSU	Darren Mougey 15-yard pass from Ryan Lindley (kick failed)	San Diego St 13–7
4	9:43	ND	Golden Tate 38-yard pass from Jimmy Clausen (Brandon Walker kick)	Notre Dame 14–13
4	2:08	ND	David Grimes 6-yard pass from Jimmy Clausen (Brandon Walker kick)	Notre Dame 21–13

On September 6, Notre Dame opened its season with a 21–13 victory over San Diego State at Notre Dame Stadium. San Diego State led, 13–7, at the start of the fourth quarter. The Irish came back with 14 unanswered points in the fourth quarter. Notre Dame stalled out multiple times throughout the game due to turnovers. The defense forced the Aztecs to fumble inside the Notre Dame five-yard line while they were leading by six in the fourth quarter.

=== Michigan ===
	1	2	3	4	Total
Wolverines	7	10	0	0	17
Fighting Irish	21	7	0	7	35

On September 13, Notre Dame defeated Michigan, 35–17, at Notre Dame Stadium. Notre Dame jumped out to a 21-point lead off of two early Michigan turnovers. Despite Michigan out-gaining the Irish 387 yards to 260 yards, Notre Dame won the turnover battle, six to two. Jimmy Clausen connected on touchdown passes of 10 yards and 48 yards to wide receivers Duval Kamara and Golden Tate, respectively. Michigan came to life after the 21 points, when Sam McGuffie turned a short pass from quarterback Steven Threet into a 40-yard touchdown. Michigan kicker K.C. Lopata's 23-yard field goal cut the lead to 21–10. The Irish then answered with an 87-yard touchdown drive, highlighted by a 60-yard pass from Clausen to Tate, who broke three tackles before being caught at the 25-yard line. Robert Hughes scored his second rushing touchdown of the day, a one-yard run to make it 28–10.

Irish linebacker Brian Smith also returned a fumble 35 yards for a touchdown in the fourth quarter to put the game away. Notre Dame didn't come away completely unscathed, however, as coach Charlie Weis was knocked over on the sideline by defensive end John Ryan, who was being run out of bounds. Weis spent the remainder of the game on crutches with his left leg wrapped. It was determined during halftime that Weis had torn his ACL and his MCL. Coach Lou Holtz and the 1988 national championship team were also honored, with a statue of Coach Holtz unveiled outside of the stadium before the game.

=== Michigan State ===
	1	2	3	4	Total
Fighting Irish	0	0	0	7	7
Spartans	3	7	3	10	23

=== Purdue ===
	1	2	3	4	Total
Boilermakers	7	7	7	0	21
Fighting Irish	0	14	21	3	38

Notre Dame improved to 3–1, matching its win total from a year ago with a 38–21 victory over Purdue. Jimmy Clausen threw for a career-high 275 yards and three touchdowns and Notre Dame running backs ran for 201 yards. The Irish offense improved on the 16 rushing yards gained against MSU, with starting running back Armando Allen Jr. running for a career-best 134 yards and a touchdown against the Boilermakers. After Purdue took a 7–0 lead on a Kory Sheets run, freshman cornerback Robert J. Blanton started the Irish scoring on a 47-yard interception return for a touchdown. Purdue answered back when Aaron Valentin scored on a 3-yard pass from Curtis Painter to make it 14–7. Jimmy Clausen threw his first touchdown pass to Golden Tate to tie it 14–14 heading into half-time.

The Irish, who hadn't scored in the third quarter in their first three games, scored on their first two possessions of the second half to open a 28–14 lead. The Boilermakers cut the lead to 28–21 four plays later when Painter threw a pass that Desmond Tardy caught at the Notre Dame 30 and raced up the left sideline for a touchdown. The Irish answered immediately, however, when Clausen threw a 30-yard TD pass to captain David Grimes on a fourth-and-7. Freshman wide receiver Michael Floyd added six catches for 100 yards and freshman tight end Kyle Rudolph also had a touchdown catch. The Boilermakers fell to 1–15 at Notre Dame Stadium since 1976. The loss also left Purdue coach Joe Tiller, who is retiring after the season, with a 5–7 record against the Irish.

=== Stanford ===
	1	2	3	4	Total
Cardinal	0	7	0	14	21
Fighting Irish	7	14	7	0	28

Notre Dame got off to a quick start against Stanford, scoring 3 touchdowns in the first half to hold on to beat Stanford 28–21. Jimmy Clausen threw for a career-high 347 yards, completing 73% of his passes and three touchdown passes and leading Notre Dame to its seventh straight win over the Cardinal. Stanford, however, made a game of it, scoring twice in the fourth quarter to cut Notre Dame's lead to 7. Cardinal quarterback Tavita Pritchard threw a 1-yard pass to Jim Dray and a 10-yard TD pass to Doug Baldwin with 6 minutes left in the game. The Cardinal got the ball back on their own 2-yard line with 3:34 left, but could not mount a drive. They had one last chance with 8 seconds left, but fumbled the ball and defensive end Pat Kuntz recovered to end the game. Kuntz also had an interception and two sacks in the game.

Freshman and Sophomores again accounted for all of Notre Dame's scoring, highlighted by a second straight 100 -yard game by Michael Floyd, who had 5 catches for 115 yards and a 48-yard touchdown catch. Sophomore running back Armando Allen amassed 153 total yards, including scoring a 3-yard rushing touchdown and a 21-yard touchdown pass from Clausen. Freshman tight end Kyle Rudolph also had 5 catches for 70 yards and a touchdown. Running back Toby Gerhart had a great day running the ball for the Cardinal, compiling 104 yards on 13 carries. Tavita Pritchard, however, turned the ball over 3 times, throwing interceptions to Notre Dame safeties David Bruton and Kyle McCarthy in addition to Kuntz. Before the game, Stanford offensive lineman Chris Marinelli made some controversial comments about Notre Dame (which he later apologized for), saying that "I hate it, playing [Notre Dame] up there. The field, excuse my language, the field sucks. The stadium sucks. I think the area sucks." Stanford has not won at Notre Dame stadium since 1992.

=== North Carolina ===
Notre Dame at North Carolina

Team	1	2	3	4	Total
Notre Dame	7	10	7	0	24
• North Carolina	3	6	13	7	29

- Date: October 11
- Location: Kenan Stadium, Chapel Hill, North Carolina
- Game start: 3:30 p.m. EST
- Game attendance: 60,500

Scoring summary
1	10:27	ND	Golden Tate 19-yard pass from Jimmy Clausen (Brandon Walker kick)	Notre Dame 7–0
1	2:49	UNC	Casey Barth 41-yard field goal	Notre Dame 7–3
2	12:53	ND	Brandon Walker 42-yard field goal	Notre Dame 10–3
2	5:22	UNC	Casey Barth 34-yard field goal	Notre Dame 10–6
2	0:52	ND	Michael Floyd 7-yard pass from Jimmy Clausen (Brandon Walker kick)	Notre Dame 17–6
2	0:09	UNC	Casey Barth 42-yard field goal	Notre Dame 17–9
3	14:48	UNC	Quan Sturdivant 32-yard interception return (Casey Barth kick)	Notre Dame 17–16
3	10:43	ND	James Aldridge 2-yard run (Brandon Walker kick)	Notre Dame 24–16
3	5:14	UNC	Ryan Houston 1-yard run (pass failed)	Notre Dame 24–22
4	14:55	UNC	Cam Sexton 4-yard run (Casey Barth kick)	North Carolina 29–24

=== Washington ===
	1	2	3	4	Total
Fighting Irish	14	3	10	6	33
Huskies	0	0	0	7	7

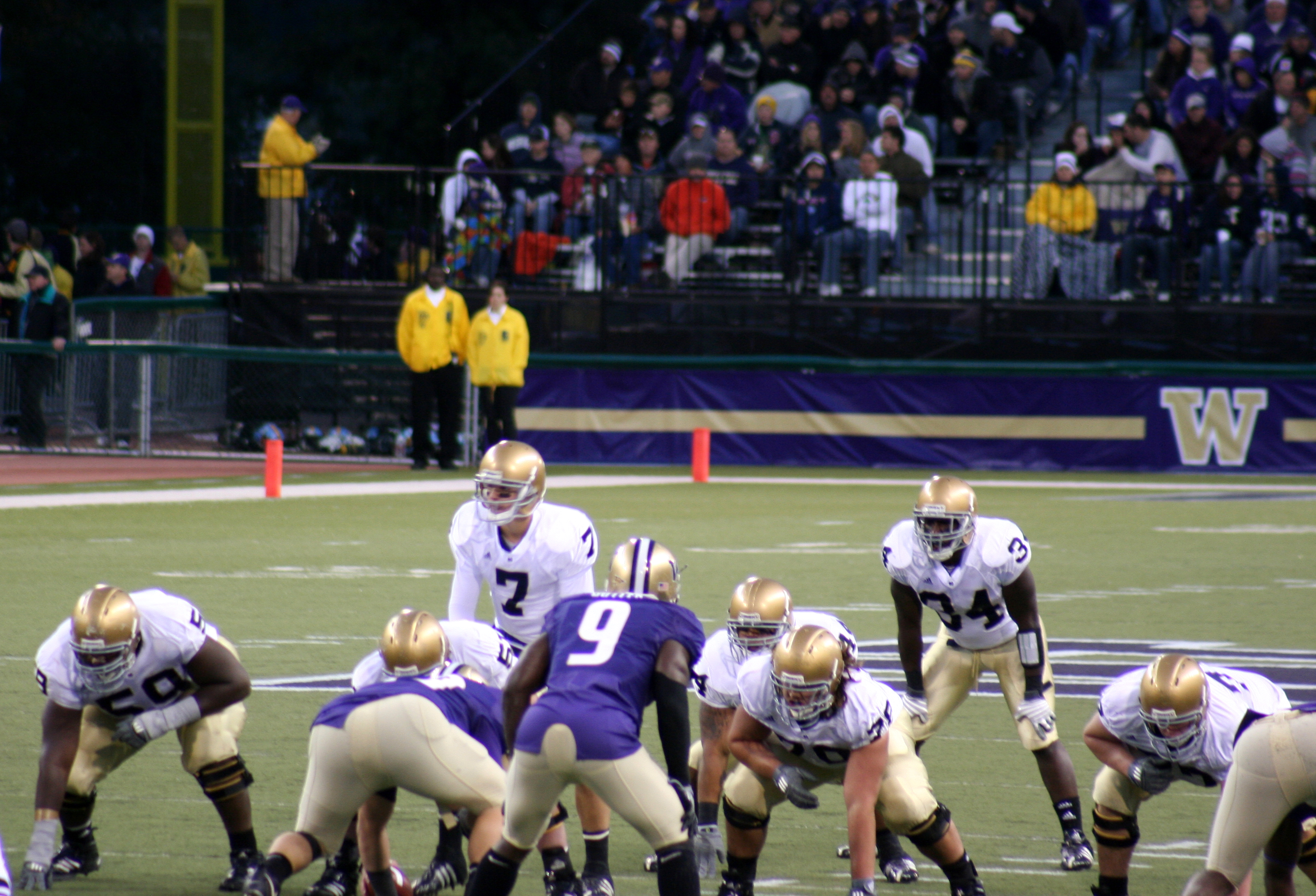
Jimmy Clausen directs the ND offense

James Aldridge ran for 84 yards and a career-high 2 touchdowns to help the Irish defeat Ty Willingham's winless Huskies 33–7. The Irish, coming off a bye week, scored touchdowns on their first two possessions of the game. On the third play from scrimmage, Jimmy Clausen connected with Michael Floyd for a 51-yard touchdown. On Notre Dame's next series, Golden Tate capped off a 9 play drive with a 21-yard rushing touchdown, the first of his career. Clausen completed 14 of 26 passes for 201 yards and interception in addition to his touchdown to Floyd. Clausen missed on 10 of his first 16 passes against a team ranked last in the nation in pass efficiency defense. Notre Dame had no problem creating offense, though, outgaining UW 238 yards to 38 yards in the first half and leading 17–0.

On the first offensive series of the third quarter, the Irish turned to Aldridge, who scored the first of his two touchdowns to put Notre Dame up 24–0. Aldridge led a running back corps that gained 252 yards on the ground. Notre Dame also relied on a stout defense, which held Washington to 124 yards of offense after allowing an average of 368 yards on the season. Washington did not cross midfield until the 6:05 mark in the fourth quarter against ND's second string defense. Huskie quarterback Ronnie Fouch connected with D'Andre Goodwin for a 6-yard touchdown with four minutes left in the game to avoid UW's first shutout loss at Husky Stadium since 1976 (a 7–0 loss against Cal).

Notre Dame's defeat dropped Willingham to 11–32 in three-plus seasons at Washington. It was announced the next day that UW would not be renewing Willingham's contract at the end of the season.

=== Pittsburgh ===
	1	2	3	4	OT	2OT	3OT	4OT	Total
Panthers	3	0	7	14	3	3	3	3	36
Fighting Irish	3	14	0	7	3	3	3	0	33

In what became the longest game in Notre Dame Stadium history, the Irish came up short against the Panthers, losing 36–33 in quadruple overtime. The game looked to be a defensive struggle early, with the game tied at 3–3 with a little over four minutes remaining before half time. Late in the second quarter on 3rd down and 12, Golden Tate made a 47-yard catch of a tipped ball to get the Irish offense to the Pitt 32-yard line. Jimmy Clausen hit Michael Floyd 4 plays later to put the Irish up 10–3. With 1:27 left, Panthers quarterback Pat Bostick threw the first of his three interceptions on the day; a 43-yard interception return by Raeshon McNeil. Clausen hit Floyd again for an Irish touchdown with :04 remaining, putting ND up 17–3 at the half.

Despite the Irish's offensive spark in the second quarter, the Panthers held Notre Dame to a mere 7 yards in the third quarter. The Panthers also answered the call on offense scoring 14 unanswered points to tie the game at 17–17. After the second Panther score, Notre Dame's offense came alive again, driving 75 yards in 12 plays and culminating in a third Clausen touchdown, this time to Golden Tate. The late drive by Notre Dame was for nought, however, as Pitt forced overtime when they tied the score at 24 with 2:22 left on a 10-yard touchdown pass from Bostick to Jonathan Baldwin on fourth-and-6. The Panthers ran the same play three straight times before Bostick beat Irish cornerback McNeil for the score.

Neither team could get into the end zone in overtime, and Pitt's Connor Lee won the kicking contest. Notre Dame's kicker, Brandon Walker, who started the season by making just 1-of-7 field goals, made his first four attempts to run his consecutive made field goal streak to seven. But his 38-yard attempt narrowly missed wide left in the fourth overtime, giving Pitt the chance kick the winning field goal.

In the defeat, Notre Dame's Michael Floyd broke the record for catches by a Notre Dame freshman, with 10 catches for 100 yards.

=== Boston College ===
	1	2	3	4	Total
Fighting Irish	0	0	0	0	0
Eagles	3	7	7	0	17

=== Navy ===
Team	1	2	3	4	Total
• Notre Dame	7	3	14	3	27
Navy	0	7	0	14	21

- Date: November 15
- Location: M&T Bank Stadium • Baltimore, Maryland
- Game start: 12:00 p.m. EST

Scoring summary
1	6:03	ND	Toryan Smith 14-yard blocked punt return (Brandon Walker kick)	Notre Dame 7–0
2	2:39	NAVY	Cory Finnerty 22-yard run (Matt Harmon kick)	Tie 7–7
2	:00	ND	Brandon Walker 28-yard field goal	Notre Dame 10–7
3	9:31	ND	Armando Allen 11-yard run (Brandon Walker kick)	Notre Dame 17–7
3	3:29	ND	Robert Hughes 7-yard run (Brandon Walker kick)	Notre Dame 24–7
4	11:17	ND	Brandon Walker 36-yard field goal	Notre Dame 27–7
4	1:39	NAVY	Shun White 24-yard run (Matt Harmon kick)	Notre Dame 27–14
4	1:21	NAVY	Ricky Dobbs 1-yard run (Matt Harmon kick)	Notre Dame 27–21

=== Syracuse ===
	1	2	3	4	Total
Orange	3	7	0	14	24
Fighting Irish	3	10	10	0	23

=== USC ===
	1	2	3	4	Total
Fighting Irish	0	0	0	3	3
Trojans	7	17	7	7	38

=== Hawaii Bowl ===
	1	2	3	4	Total
Fighting Irish	7	21	21	0	49
Warriors	0	7	7	7	21

Notre Dame beat Hawaii 49–21 in its first bowl victory since the Irish defeated Texas A&M in the 1994 Cotton Bowl Classic to end the 1993 season. Irish quarterback Jimmy Clausen broke school bowl game records after passing for 401 yards and five touchdowns, and his 84.6% completion rate was the second-best completion percentage for any player in any bowl game in NCAA history. Wide receiver Golden Tate also set Irish bowl records upon catching for 177 yards and three touchdowns. Both players were named co-MVPs of the game.

In all, Notre Dame broke 9 bowl records in the victory. In addition to Clausen and Tate's record day, Notre Dame set bowl records in total offense (481 yards), scoring (49 points), and longest kick return (96 yards by Allen). Clausen's 69-yard connection to Tate is also a new record. The defense also had a good day for the Irish, registering 8 sacks and an interception. The victory also ties the 1978 Cotton Bowl Classic for Notre Dame's largest margin of victory in a bowl game at 28 points.

== Personnel ==
2008 Notre Dame Fighting Irish football team roster
Players
Coaches
Offense

Pos.	#	Name	Class
WR	1	Deion Walker	Fr
WR	3	Michael Floyd	Fr
RB	5	Armando Allen Jr.	So
QB	7	Jimmy Clausen	So
TE	9	Kyle Rudolph	Fr
QB	10	Dayne Crist	Fr
WR	11	David Grimes	Sr
QB	12	Nick Lezynski	So
QB	13	Evan Sharpley	Sr
QB	15	Brian Castello	So
QB	16	Nate Montana	Fr
WR	18	Duval Kamara	So
WR	19	George West Jr.	Jr
RB	21	Barry Gallup Jr.	Jr
WR	23	Golden Tate	So
WR	24	Brian Coughlin	Jr
RB	25	Jonas Gray	Fr
WR	29	Michael Garcia	So
FB	30	Steve Paskorz	So
FB	32	Luke Schmidt	Jr
RB	33	Robert Hughes	So
RB	34	James Aldridge	Jr
TE	35	Kevin Brooks	Jr
RB	37	Eras Noel	So
WR	38	Christopher Gurries	So
RB	41	Nikolas Rodriguez	Sr
WR	42	Dan Franco	Jr
FB	44	Asaph Schwapp	Sr
WR	45	Kris Patterson	Sr
FB	47	Mike Narvaez	Jr
C	51	Dan Wenger	Jr
C	52	Braxston Cave	Fr
G	55	Eric Olsen	Jr
C	57	Mike Golic Jr.	Fr
G	59	Chris Stewart	Jr
C	62	Bill Flavin	So
OT	63	Jeff Tisak	Sr
OL	65	Mike Hernandez	Fr
C	67	Thomas Bemenderfer	Sr
G	69	Carl Brophy	Fr
OT	70	Matt Romine	So
OL	71	Dennis Mahoney	Fr
OT	72	Paul Duncan	Sr
OT	74	Sam Young	Jr
OT	75	Lane Clelland	Fr
OT	75	Taylor Dever	So
G	77	Michael Turkovich	Sr
G	78	Trevor Robinson	Fr
WR	81	John Goodman	Fr
WR	82	Robby Parris	Jr
TE	83	Mike Ragone	So
TE	84	Will Yeatman	So
WR	85	Sam Vos	Jr
TE	86	Paul Kuppich	Sr
TE	87	Joseph Fauria	Fr

Defense

Pos.	#	Name	Class
CB	4	Gary Gray	So
S	6	Ray Herring	Sr
CB	8	Raeshon McNeil	Jr
DE	9	Ethan Johnson	Fr
CB	12	Robert Blanton	Fr
S	15	Dan McCarthy	Fr
CB	20	Terrail Lambert	Sr
S	22	Harrison Smith	So
CB	24	Leonard Gordon	Jr
CB	26	Jamoris Slaughter	Fr
S	27	David Bruton	Sr
S	28	Kyle McCarthy	Sr
S	29	Jashaad Gaines	Jr
S	31	Sergio Brown	Jr
MLB	35	Kevin Smith	Sr
MLB	36	David Posluszny	Fr
CB	37	Mike Anello	Sr
S	38	Chris Bathon	Jr
MLB	40	Maurice Crum Jr.	Sr
OLB	41	Scott Smith	Sr
MLB	42	Kevin Washington	Sr
CB	43	John Leonis	Sr
OLB	45	Darius Fleming	Fr
OLB	46	Steve Filer	Fr
LB	47	Joe Vittoria	Jr
MLB	48	Steve Quinn	Sr
MLB	49	Toryan Smith	Jr
DE	53	Morrice Richardson	Jr
MLB	54	Anthony McDonald	Fr
OLB	56	Kerry Neal	So
MLB	58	Brian Smith	So
DL	61	Martin Quintana	Jr
LB	64	Tom Burke	Jr
DE	76	Andrew Nuss	So
DE	79	Hafis Williams	Fr
DE	89	Kapron Lewis-Moore	Fr
OLB	90	John Ryan	Jr
DE	91	Emeka Nwankwo	So
NT	93	Paddy Mullen	Jr
DE	94	Justin Brown	Sr
NT	95	Ian Williams	So
DE	96	Pat Kuntz	Sr
OLB	97	Kallen Wade	Jr
DE	98	Sean Cwynar	Fr
NT	99	Brandon Newman	Fr

Special teams

Pos.	#	Name	Class
K	14	Brandon Walker	So
K	32	David Ruffer	So
K	36	Joe Bizjak	Jr
K	39	Ryan Burkhart	Jr
P	43	Eric Maust	Jr

Head coach

- Charlie Weis

Coordinators/assistant coaches

- Corwin Brown – Defensive Coordinator/Defensive Backs
- Michael Haywood – Offensive Coordinator/Running Backs
- Rob Ianello – Receivers Coach/Recruiting Coordinator
- John Latina – Asst. Head Coach (Offense)/Offensive Line
- Jappy Oliver – Defensive Line Coach
- Bernie Parmalee – Tight Ends Coach
- Brian Polian – Special Teams Coach
- Ron Powlus – Quarterbacks Coach
- Jon Tenuta – Asst. Head Coach (Defense)/Linebackers
- Patrick Graham – Defensive Graduate Assistant
- Kevin Loney – Offensive Graduate Assistant

Legend

- (C) Team captain
- (S) Suspended
- (I) Ineligible
- Injured
- Redshirt

Roster

=== Recruiting ===
The Irish added 23 players to its roster with high school recruits. Included in the class were five-star wide receiver recruit Michael Floyd, five-star quarterback recruit Dayne Crist, and five-star defensive lineman Ethan Johnson. Five-star tight end Kyle Rudolph also bolstered a class that included six four star recruits on offense, and nine four star recruits on defense. The class was named No. 2 by both Rivals and Scout. Rivals revised Notre Dame's ranking to No. 1 after factoring in players recruited by other schools that did not enroll with their classmates.

College recruiting (2008)
Name	Hometown	School	Height	Weight	40^{‡}	Commit date
Robert Blanton; CB	Matthews, NC	David W Butler HS	6 ft 1 in (1.85 m)	176 lb (80 kg)	4.5	Jun 20, 2007
Robert Blanton; CB	Recruit ratings: Scout: Rivals: (76)					
Braxston Cave; C	Mishawaka, IN	Penn HS	6 ft 4 in (1.93 m)	293 lb (133 kg)	5.09	Mar 3, 2007
Braxston Cave; C	Recruit ratings: Scout: Rivals: (81)					
Lane Clelland; OG	Owings Mills, MD	Mc Donogh HS	6 ft 5 in (1.96 m)	267 lb (121 kg)	4.9	May 3, 2007
Lane Clelland; OG	Recruit ratings: Scout: Rivals: (79)					
Dayne Crist; QB	Sherman Oaks, CA	Notre Dame HS	6 ft 5 in (1.96 m)	226 lb (103 kg)	4.68	Apr 19, 2007
Dayne Crist; QB	Recruit ratings: Scout: Rivals: (84)					
Sean Cwynar; DT	Woodstock, IL	Marian Central Catholic HS	6 ft 4 in (1.93 m)	283.5 lb (128.6 kg)	NA	Mar 6, 2007
Sean Cwynar; DT	Recruit ratings: Scout: Rivals: (79)					
Joseph Fauria; TE	Encino, CA	Crespi Carmelite HS	6 ft 7 in (2.01 m)	250 lb (110 kg)	4.75	Jul 24, 2007
Joseph Fauria; TE	Recruit ratings: Scout: Rivals: (79)					
Steve Filer; LB	Chicago, IL	Mount Carmel HS	6 ft 4 in (1.93 m)	220 lb (100 kg)	4.65	Apr 21, 2007
Steve Filer; LB	Recruit ratings: Scout: Rivals: (81)					
Darius Fleming; SLB	Chicago, IL	St. Rita HS	6 ft 3 in (1.91 m)	230 lb (100 kg)	4.57	Apr 21, 2007
Darius Fleming; SLB	Recruit ratings: Scout: Rivals: (81)					
Michael Floyd; WR	St. Paul, MN	Cretin Derham Hall	6 ft 3 in (1.91 m)	197 lb (89 kg)	4.55	Oct 21, 2007
Michael Floyd; WR	Recruit ratings: Scout: Rivals: (83)					
Michael Golic Jr. OG	West Hartford, CT	Northwest Catholic HS	6 ft 5 in (1.96 m)	263 lb (119 kg)	5.1	Feb 19, 2007
Michael Golic Jr. OG	Recruit ratings: Scout: Rivals: (79)					
John Goodman; WR	Fort Wayne, IN	Bishop Dwenger HS	6 ft 4 in (1.93 m)	189 lb (86 kg)	4.5	Mar 3, 2007
John Goodman; WR	Recruit ratings: Scout: Rivals: (79)					
Jonas Gray; RB	Beverly Hills, MI	Detroit Country Day School	5 ft 11 in (1.80 m)	214 lb (97 kg)	4.40	Oct 22, 2007
Jonas Gray; RB	Recruit ratings: Scout: Rivals: (82)					
Ethan Johnson; DE	Portland, OR	Lincoln HS	6 ft 4 in (1.93 m)	265 lb (120 kg)	4.85	Jun 27, 2007
Ethan Johnson; DE	Recruit ratings: Scout: Rivals: (82)					
Kapron Lewis-Moore; DE	Weatherford, TX	Weatherford HS	6 ft 4 in (1.93 m)	225 lb (102 kg)	4.83	Feb 6, 2008
Kapron Lewis-Moore; DE	Recruit ratings: Scout: Rivals:					
Dan McCarthy; S	Youngstown, OH	Cardinal Mooney HS	6 ft 2 in (1.88 m)	190 lb (86 kg)	4.49	Jul 16, 2007
Dan McCarthy; S	Recruit ratings: Scout: Rivals: (80)					
Anthony McDonald; MLB	Sherman Oaks, CA	Notre Dame HS	6 ft 3 in (1.91 m)	220 lb (100 kg)	4.53	Apr 11, 2007
Anthony McDonald; MLB	Recruit ratings: Scout: Rivals: (79)					
Brandon Newman; DT	Louisville, KY	Pleasure Ridge Park HS	6 ft 1 in (1.85 m)	302 lb (137 kg)	5.07	May 26, 2007
Brandon Newman; DT	Recruit ratings: Scout: Rivals: (79)					
David Posluszny; WLB	Aliquippa, PA	Hopewell Senior HS	6 ft 1 in (1.85 m)	210 lb (95 kg)	4.61	Apr 6, 2007
David Posluszny; WLB	Recruit ratings: Scout: Rivals: (79)					
Trevor Robinson; OG	Elkhorn, NE	Elkhorn Secondary School	6 ft 6 in (1.98 m)	304 lb (138 kg)	5.20	Dec 14, 2007
Trevor Robinson; OG	Recruit ratings: Scout: Rivals: (80)					
Kyle Rudolph; TE	Cincinnati, OH	Elder HS	6 ft 7 in (2.01 m)	180 lb (82 kg)	4.55	Mar 26, 2007
Kyle Rudolph; TE	Recruit ratings: Scout: Rivals: (81)					
Jamoris Slaughter; S	Tucker, GA	Tucker HS	6 ft 1 in (1.85 m)	183 lb (83 kg)	4.50	Jun 27, 2007
Jamoris Slaughter; S	Recruit ratings: Scout: Rivals: (82)					
Deion Walker; WR	Christchurch, VA	Christchurch School	6 ft 4 in (1.93 m)	185 lb (84 kg)	4.44	Jan 5, 2008
Deion Walker; WR	Recruit ratings: Scout: Rivals: (81)					
Hafis Williams; DT	Elizabeth, NJ	Elizabeth HS	6 ft 4 in (1.93 m)	290 lb (130 kg)	May 2, 2007	
Hafis Williams; DT	Recruit ratings: Scout: Rivals: (79)					
Adam Wisbrock; TE	Palatine, IL	Palatine HS	6 ft 6 in (1.98 m)	215 lb (98 kg)	4.52	Jun 21, 2007
Adam Wisbrock; TE	Recruit ratings: Scout: Rivals: (81)					
Overall recruit ranking: Scout: #2 Rivals: #1
‡ Refers to 40-yard dash; Note: In many cases, Scout, Rivals, 247Sports, On3, and ESPN may conflict in their listings of height, weight and 40 time.; In these cases, the average was taken. ESPN grades are on a 100-point scale.; Sources: "Notre Dame Commit List 2008". Rivals.; "Scout.com Football Recruiting: Notre Dame". Scout.; "2008 Player Commitments – Notre Dame". ESPN.; "Scout.com Team Recruiting Rankings". Scout.; "2008 Team Ranking". Rivals.com.

== Statistics ==
=== Offense ===
==== Rushing ====
Name	GP	Att	Yards	Avg	TD	Long
Armando Allen	13	134	585	4.4	3	21
Robert Hughes	12	112	382	3.4	4	18
James Aldridge	12	91	357	3.9	3	19
Jonas Gray	4	21	90	4.3	0	19
Harrison Smith	12	2	58	29.0	0	35
Golden Tate	13	5	37	7.4	1	24
David Grimes	9	2	15	7.5	0	10
Asaph Schwapp	2	1	2	2.0	0	2
Evan Sharpley	3	4	1	0.3	0	2
Eric Maust	13	1	−8	−8.0	0	0
Jimmy Clausen	13	54	−73	−1.4	0	10
Total		436	1426	3.3	11	35
Opponents		430	1744	4.1	18	63

==== Passing ====
Name	GP-GS	Effic	Att-Cmp-Int	Pct	Yds	TD	Lng	Avg/G
Jimmy Clausen	12–12	132.49	440–268–17	60.9%	3,172	25	69 (TD)	264
Evan Sharpley	3–0	90.2	5–3–0	60.0%	18	0	6	6
Total	–	131.4	447–271–17	60.6%	3,190	25	69 (TD)	245.4
Opponents								

==== Receiving ====
Name	GP	No.	Yds	Avg	TD	Long	Avg/G
Golden Tate	13	58	1080	18.6	10	69 (TD)	83.0
Michael Floyd	9	48	719	15.0	7	51 (TD)	79.8
Armando Allen	13	50	355	7.1	2	41	29.6
Kyle Rudolph	13	29	340	11.7	2	29	26.1
David Grimes	8	35	321	9.2	3	31	40.1
Duval Kamara	13	20	206	10.1	1	28	15.8
Robert Hughes	12	14	93	6.6	0	15	7.8
Robby Parris	4	9	50	5.6	0	12	
Asaph Schwapp		2	13	6.5	0	10	
George West	1	1	6	6.0	0	6	
Will Yeatman	3	2	6	3.0	0	4	
James Aldridge	12	3	1	0.3	0	6	
Total		271	3190	11.8	25	69 (TD)	231.4
Opponents							

=== Defense ===
Name	GP	TKL	SKS	SOLO	PD	INT	FF	BK	TD	AVG
Zion Azuma Losi	13	168	10	7	18	10	8	3	4	87.5
Total										

== Awards and honors ==
Freshman tight end Kyle Rudolph earned freshman first-team All-America honors from The Sporting News, CollegeFootballNews.com and Phil Steele. Rudolph set freshman school records for receptions and receiving yards, logging 25 receptions for 262 yards and two touchdowns.

Freshman wide receiver Michael Floyd also earned all-freshman second-team honors from The Sporting News, CollegeFootballNews.com, Rivals.com and Phil Steele.

Offensive guard Trevor Robinson was named to the all-freshman second team by CollegeFootballNews.com, while wide receiver Golden Tate was a sophomore honorable mention selection.

== 2009 NFL draft ==
David Bruton was the only Notre Dame player selected in the 2009 NFL draft, going in the fourth round to the Denver Broncos as the 114th pick overall. Five more players signed with NFL teams, including David Grimes with Broncos, Pat Kuntz with the Indianapolis Colts, Terrail Lambert with the San Francisco 49ers, and fullback Asaph Schwapp and offensive lineman Mike Turkovich with the Dallas Cowboys.
