= 2009 Notre Dame Fighting Irish football team =

American college football season

2009 Notre Dame Fighting Irish football
- Conference: Independent
- Record: 6–6
- Head coach: Charlie Weis (5th season)
- Offensive scheme: Pro-style
- Co-defensive coordinators: Corwin Brown (3rd season); Jon Tenuta (1st season)
- Base defense: 4–3
- MVPs: Jimmy Clausen; Golden Tate
- Captains: Jimmy Clausen; Kyle McCarthy; Eric Olsen; Scott Smith
- Home stadium: Notre Dame Stadium

2009 NCAA Division I FBS independents football records
	Conf.			Overall
Team	W		L	W		L
Navy		–		10	–	4
Notre Dame		–		6	–	6
Army		–		5	–	7
Rankings from AP Poll

The 2009 Notre Dame Fighting Irish football team was an American football team that represented the University of Notre Dame as an independent during the 2009 NCAA Division I FBS football season. In their fifth and final season under head coach Charlie Weis, the Irish compiled a 6–6 record and outscored opponents by a total of 361 to 311. They were 6–2 after eight games, but lost the final four games to Navy, Pitt, Connecticut, and Stanford.

Notre Dame's passing offense was outstanding. Wide receiver Golden Tate tallied a school-record 93 receptions for 1,496 yards, scored 108 points, and won the Fred Biletnikoff Award. Quarterback Jimmy Clausen completed 68.0% of his passes, had a 161.4 passer rating, and tallied 3,722 passing yards (second most in Notre Dame history) and 28 touchdowns. On defense, the Irish gave up 397.8 yards per game, ranking 87th of 120 Division I FBS teams.

Weis was fired as head coach two days after the final game. Although Notre Dame was bowl eligible with six wins, the university chose not to play in a bowl game. Notre Dame athletic director Jack Swarbrick hired Cincinnati head coach Brian Kelly after a 10-day coaching search.

The team played its home games at Notre Dame Stadium in Notre Dame, Indiana.

== Schedule ==
Date	Time	Opponent	Rank	Site	TV	Result	Attendance	Source
September 5	3:30 p.m.	Nevada	No. 23	Notre Dame Stadium; Notre Dame, IN	NBC	W 35–0	80,795	
September 12	3:30 p.m.	at Michigan	No. 18	Michigan Stadium; Ann Arbor, MI (rivalry)	ABC	L 34–38	110,278	
September 19	3:30 p.m.	Michigan State		Notre Dame Stadium; South Bend, IN (rivalry)	NBC	W 33–30	80,795	
September 26	8:00 p.m.	at Purdue		Ross–Ade Stadium; West Lafayette, IN (rivalry)	ESPN	W 24–21	59,082	
October 3	3:30 p.m.	Washington		Notre Dame Stadium; Notre Dame, IN	NBC	W 37–30 ^{OT}	80,795	
October 17	3:30 p.m.	No. 6 USC	No. 25	Notre Dame Stadium; Notre Dame, IN (rivalry)	NBC	L 27–34	80,795	
October 24	3:30 p.m.	Boston College		Notre Dame Stadium; Notre Dame, IN (Holy War)	NBC	W 20–16	80,795	
October 31	7:30 p.m.	vs. Washington State	No. 23	Alamodome; San Antonio, TX (Shamrock Series)	NBC	W 40–14	53,407	
November 7	2:30 p.m.	Navy	No. 22	Notre Dame Stadium; Notre Dame, IN (rivalry)	NBC	L 21–23	80,795	
November 14	8:00 p.m.	at No. 8 Pittsburgh		Heinz Field; Pittsburgh, PA (rivalry)	ABC	L 22–27	65,374	
November 21	2:30 p.m.	Connecticut		Notre Dame Stadium; Notre Dame, IN	NBC	L 30–33 ^{2OT}	80,795	
November 28	8:00 p.m.	at Stanford		Stanford Stadium; Stanford, CA (rivalry)	ABC	L 38–45	50,510	
Rankings from AP Poll released prior to the game; All times are in Eastern time

== Preseason ==
=== Coaching changes ===
Following the 2008 season, offensive coordinator Michael Haywood left the team to become the head coach for the Miami (Ohio) University Redhawks. Following what some critics called a disappointing 7–6 season, Charlie Weis announced several major changes to the coaching staff, including the replacement of the offensive and defensive line coaches. Frank Verducci was hired to replace John Latina as the offensive line coach and was placed in charge of revamping the Irish running game as the running game coordinator. Tony Alford was hired to replace Mike Haywood as the running backs coach. Finally, Weis hired defensive line coach Randy Hart, a veteran coach at University of Washington from 1988 to 2008. Former Notre Dame standout and NFL veteran Bryant Young was also hired as a defensive graduate assistant with the possibility of eventually stepping in to coach the defensive line.

=== Roster changes ===
==== Graduating players ====
Senior safety and captain David Bruton was the only player drafted from the team, going in the fourth round to the Denver Broncos as the 114th pick overall. Five more players would sign quickly after the draft, including David Grimes with Broncos, Pat Kuntz with the Colts, Terrail Lambert with the 49ers, and fullback Asaph Schwapp and offensive lineman Mike Turkovich with the Cowboys. Defensive lineman Justin Brown and captain Maurice Crum Jr. also exhausted their eligibility.

==== Transfers ====
Tight end Joseph Fauria transferred from Notre Dame to UCLA prior to the start of the season following an undisclosed University violation that would have sidelined him for the season.

=== Award candidates ===
The following players were announced to award watch lists prior to the start of the 2009 season:

- Armando Allen – Doak Walker Award
- Jimmy Clausen – Davey O'Brien Award, Maxwell Award
- Kyle Rudolph – Mackey Award (only sophomore named to the list)
- Golden Tate – Biletnikoff Award, Maxwell Award
- Dan Wenger – Rimington Trophy
- Sam Young – Outland Trophy

== Rankings ==
Ranking movements Legend: ██ Increase in ranking ██ Decrease in ranking — = Not ranked
	Week																
Poll	Pre	1	2	3	4	5	6	7	8	9	10	11	12	13	14	15	Final
AP	23	18	—	—	—	—	25	—	25	19	—						
Coaches	23	20	—	—	—	—	25	—	25	21	—						
Harris	Not released				—	—	25	—	24	20	—						Not released
BCS	Not released							—	23	22	—						Not released

== Game summaries ==
=== Nevada ===
	1	2	3	4	Total
Wolf Pack	0	0	0	0	0
#23 Fighting Irish	7	21	7	0	35

Notre Dame beat Hall of Fame coach Chris Ault's Nevada squad 35–0 to give Charlie Weis his first and only shutout as Irish head coach. Irish quarterback Jimmy Clausen continued his efficient play from the Hawai'i Bowl victory the previous season (22–26 for 401 yards and 5 touchdowns), completing 15 of 18 passes for 315 yards and four touchdowns. Clausen started the game by completing 10 of 11 passes for 184 yards and three touchdowns, highlighted by a then career-long 70-yard pass for a touchdown to Irish wide receiver Michael Floyd. Clausen bettered that in the third quarter with an 88-yard scoring pass to Floyd. The 88-yard touchdown was the third longest pass completion in Notre Dame history. Floyd leapt over Wolf Pack cornerback Doyle Miller and kept his balance when Miller tried to pull him down at the 50-yard line, then raced in for the score. Clausen also completed a 24-yard TD catch to Floyd and a 19-yard touchdown pass to tight end Kyle Rudolph in the first drive of the game. Irish running back Armando Allen logged the other touchdown on a 1-yard run. He finished the game with 72 yards on 15 carries.

The victory was Notre Dame's first shutout victory since a 42–0 win over Rutgers in 2002. The Irish defense set the tone early, stopping Nevada to three and out on its first three possessions. Irish linebacker Toryan Smith stuffed Wolf Pack running back Vai Taua for a 1-yard loss on fourth-and-1 and also logged a sack. Highly touted freshman linebacker Manti Te'o also got in on the action for Notre Dame on his first play early in the second quarter. On third-and-15 from the Nevada 26, Nevada quarterback Colin Kaepernick took off and had some room but Te'o caught him from behind after an 11-yard gain, forcing the Wolfpack to punt. The Irish defense held Nevada to 153 yards rushing and 307 total yards. Kaepernick was 12 of 23 passing for 149 yards with two interceptions. Irish cornerback Robert Blanton intercepted a Kaepernick pass at the end of the half, and senior captain Kyle McCarthy logged the second interception of the day and the fourth of his career in the third quarter.

=== Michigan ===
	1	2	3	4	Total
#18 Fighting Irish	3	17	0	14	34
Wolverines	14	3	7	14	38

Offense ruled the day as the Fighting Irish were upset in the final seconds by archrival Michigan, 38–34. The 72 combined points were the most in the history of the Notre Dame – Michigan rivalry, and the game marked just the fifth time Michigan has scored 30 points or more against Notre Dame. Jimmy Clausen continued his impressive play, throwing for 336 yards and 3 touchdowns, but it was not enough to offset costly penalties (9 for 75 yards), questionable play-calling, and an efficient performance by Michigan freshman quarterback Tate Forcier (23 for 33, 240 yards, 2 TD, 1 INT).

After Daryl Stronum's 94-yard kickoff return for a touchdown helped the Wolverines to an early 14–3 lead, Notre Dame roared back in the second quarter, largely on the strength of Clausen's passing. Clausen threw touchdowns on successive drives—the first to Golden Tate, the second to Michael Floyd—to give the Irish their first lead of the afternoon at 17–14. The teams traded field goals at the end of the quarter and Notre Dame took a 20–17 lead to the locker room.

On the first series of the second half, Forcier led Michigan down to the Notre Dame 9-yard line before a missed field goal gave the Irish a temporary reprieve. A Jonas Gray fumble on the ensuing Notre Dame possession was recovered by Michigan at the Irish 26-yard line, and five plays later, the Wolverines regained the lead on a 3-yard touchdown pass from Forcier to Kevin Koger.

Michigan extended its lead to 31–20 on the second play of the fourth quarter when Forcier, facing fourth-and-three, ran 31 yards for a touchdown. Clausen rallied the Irish with a 14-play, 80-yard drive that culminated with a 21-yard touchdown pass to Golden Tate, and Kyle McCarthy intercepted Forcier on the next series, giving Notre Dame the ball at the Michigan 36. The 7-play drive was capped by an 8-yard Armando Allen touchdown run and a successful two-point conversion run by Allen off a well-executed Statue of Liberty play, giving the Irish a 34–31 lead with a little over 5 minutes remaining.

The Notre Dame defense stiffened and forced a punt, giving the Irish offense the ball back with 3:07 remaining. Allen rushed 13-yards to the Notre Dame 29 for a first down, but Robert Hughes was stopped on the next play for no gain and Michigan used its first timeout to stop the clock at 2:29. Rather than run the ball and force Michigan to use its two remaining timeouts, Notre Dame head coach Charlie Weis called pass plays on second- and third-down, both of which fell incomplete, and the Irish punted the ball back to Michigan having only taken 54 seconds off the clock. Forcier made the Irish pay for their mistake, coolly driving the Wolverines down to the Notre Dame 5-yard line, where he connected with Greg Matthews for the game-winning touchdown with 11 seconds left in the game.

With the heartbreaking loss, Notre Dame fell out of the top 25 in both the AP and Coaches' Polls.

=== Michigan State ===
	1	2	3	4	Total
Spartans	3	14	6	7	30
Fighting Irish	13	3	10	7	33

Notre Dame recovered from its tough loss at Michigan by beating rival Michigan State for the first time at Notre Dame Stadium since 1993. The win wasn't sealed until Kyle McCarthy intercepted Spartans quarterback Kirk Cousins at the Irish 4-yard line with 57 seconds remaining in the game. Trailing 30–26 midway through the fourth quarter, Jimmy Clausen connected with Golden Tate off a fly route for what proved to be a 33-yard game-winning touchdown. A key play occurred late in the third quarter when Irish defensive tackle Ian Johnson blocked a Michigan State extra point to leave the score 26–23 Notre Dame; had the extra point been successful, Michigan State could have won the game with a field goal on its final drive.

Clausen, playing through a turf toe injury, had another big game, going 22 for 31 with an even 300 yards and 2 touchdowns. Halfback Armando Allen rushed 23 times for 115 yards and a touchdown and also threw a 5-yard touchdown pass to Robby Paris out of the wildcat formation. The defense continued to be a problem for Notre Dame, as it surrendered 459 yards of total offense to the Spartans, including 354 through the air.

The win also proved to be costly, as Notre Dame star wide receiver Michael Floyd was lost for the several regular season games to a broken collarbone suffered during the second quarter.

=== Purdue ===
	1	2	3	4	Total
Fighting Irish	3	14	0	7	24
Boilermakers	7	0	0	14	21

With the game on the line, Notre Dame coach Charlie Weis put the game in the hands of his hobbled quarterback Jimmy Clausen. Slowed by a turf-toe injury sustained in the Michigan State game, Clausen engineered an 88-yard game-winning drive with 3:41 to go to give Notre Dame a 24–21 victory over the Boilermakers. Trailing 21–17, Clausen completed a 22-yard pass to tight end Kyle Rudolph to move the ball to the Purdue 32. After a Purdue forced Notre Dame into a 3rd-and-14. Clausen completed a 15-yard pass to wideout Robby Parris for a first down. A 17-yarder to Golden Tate set up a first-and-goal at the 4. After three plays netted two yards, Clausen found Rudolph in the end zone on fourth down for the winner with less than a minute remaining.

Clausen played mediocre for most of the game, completing 15 of 26 passes for 171 yards, and throwing his first interception of the season. After splitting time with backup quarterback Dayne Crist, who directed two touchdown drives in the first half, Clausen returned to the game when it got tight in the fourth quarter. The victory was the Irish's third straight game decided in the final minutes. Kyle McCarthy had an interception at the 4-yard line with 57 seconds left to seal Notre Dame's 33–30 win over Michigan State the week before. A week earlier, Michigan's Tate Forcier threw a 5-yard touchdown pass with 11 seconds remaining to beat the Irish 38–34.

=== Washington ===
	1	2	3	4	OT	Total
Huskies	7	10	7	6	0	30
Fighting Irish	3	13	3	11	7	37

Notre Dame defeats the Washington Huskies 37–30 at Notre Dame Stadium to give Notre Dame its 4th win of the season. Notre Dame stayed alive with 3 goal line stands resulting in only 3 Washington Husky points. Golden Tate was able to scorch Washington's defense for 244 yards receiving, 31 yards rushing and one touchdown. Notre Dame finally wins in OT and extends their record to 8–0 against the Huskies.

=== USC ===
	1	2	3	4	Total
#6 Trojans	7	6	14	7	34
#25 Fighting Irish	7	0	7	13	27

Notre Dame nearly caps off the incredible comeback against the trojans, but fall short and give up their 2nd loss of the season. Clausen and the Fighting Irish got off to a poor start in the 1st half, only scoring 7 points to USC's 13. USC continued their rout in the 3rd Quarter scoring 2 touchdowns and mounting a drive that would get the trojans a touchdown early in the 4th quarter, giving them a 34–14 lead over the Fighting Irish. However a surge by Notre Dame, led by Jimmy Clausen, who scored 2 4th quarter Touchdowns. 1 on the ground and 1 in the air to get the Fighting Irish within one Touchdown. Duval Kamara missed an easy touchdown catch when he tripped over the goal line, spoiling a chance for Notre Dame to tie late in the fourth quarter. Notre Dame had the ball inside the USC 5 and appeared to score on a pass to Kyle Rudolph, but it was controversially ruled incomplete and never reviewed and ND was unable to score before the clock ran out at Notre Dame Stadium giving ND the 34–27 loss to the Trojans. Notre Dame has not beaten USC since 2001.

=== Boston College ===
	1	2	3	4	Total
Eagles	2	7	7	0	16
Fighting Irish	3	10	0	7	20

Notre Dame notched its first victory vs. Boston College since 2000, outlasting the Eagles 20–16. In a game that had four lead changes, it was the Irish defense that came up big in the end, intercepting three passes by Eagles quarterback Dave Shinskie in the second half. Notre Dame linebacker Brian Smith sealed the victory by picking off Shinskie with 98 seconds left in the game.

The Irish scored first on a 37-yard Nick Tausch field goal. Boston College would log its first points of the game on a safety resulting from an intentional grounding penalty called on Jimmy Clausen. After Nick Taush kicked a 34-yard field goal to make it 6–2, Dave Shinskie led the Eagles down the field to take the lead on a 7-yard touchdown pass to wide receiver Rich Gunnell. Jimmy Clausen and the Irish offense answered right back before the end of the first half with a 12-play, 74-yard drive culminating in an 11-yard touchdown pass from Clausen to Golden Tate. The Irish defense, however, could not maintain the lead to start the third quarter, giving up large pass plays and a 6-play, 56 yard scoring drive by the Eagles. After several stalled drives by the Irish offense, Jimmy Clausen finally connected with Golden tate on a 36-yard touchdown pass to put the Irish ahead for good with a little over eight minutes left in the game. Clausen would finish the game passing 26 for 39 with 246 yards and two touchdowns. Golden Tate logged his 5th 100+ yard receiving game, notching 128 yards on 11 catches with two touchdowns. Senior captain Kyle McCarthy also logged two of the second half interceptions to seal the Irish win.

=== Washington State ===
#25 Notre Dame vs. Washington State

Team	1	2	3	4	Total
Washington St	0	7	0	7	14
• Notre Dame	9	21	3	7	40

- Date: October 31
- Location: Alamodome, San Antonio, Texas
- Game start: 7:30 p.m. EST
- Television network: NBC
- Source: ESPN

Scoring summary
1	9:44	ND	Nick Tausch 29-yard field goal	Notre Dame 3–0
1	:14	ND	Duval Kamara 7-yard pass from Jimmy Clausen (kick blocked)	Notre Dame 9–0
2	9:29	ND	Golden Tate 16-yard run (Nick Tausch kick)	Notre Dame 16–0
2	4:05	ND	Robert Hughes 1-yard run (Nick Tausch kick)	Notre Dame 23–0
2	1:16	WSU	Jared Karstetter 11-yard pass from Jeff Tuel (Nico Grasu kick)	Notre Dame 23–7
2	:00	ND	Golden Tate 50-yard pass from Jimmy Clausen (Nick Tausch kick)	Notre Dame 30–7
3	3:16	ND	Nick Tausch 23-yard field goal	Notre Dame 33–7
4	10:01	ND	John Goodman 64-yard pass from Dayne Crist (Nick Tausch kick)	Notre Dame 40–7
4	5:16	WSU	Jared Karstetter 8-yard pass from Jeff Tuel (Nico Grasu kick)	Notre Dame 40–14

In the first of several "offsite home games" scheduled over the next several football seasons, Notre Dame played host to Washington State in the Alamodome in San Antonio, Texas. The Cougars, who last played Notre Dame in 2003 losing in overtime 29–26, were routed 40–14. Notre Dame would score first with a Nick Tausch a 29-yard field goal. Notre Dame's next score came from a Jimmy Clausen pass to Duval Kamara for a 7-yard touchdown in the first quarter. In the second quarter, Golden Tate scored on a 16-yard run for a touchdown out of the wildcat formation. After a Robert Hughes touchdown put Notre Dame up 23–0, Washington State's Jeff Tuel would cut the Notre Dame lead to 23–7, connecting with Jared Karstetter for an 11-yard touchdown. Notre Dame regained momentum, however, as Clausen's second touchdown came with 7 seconds left in the half; a spectacular 50-yard hail-mary pass which Golden Tate caught in triple coverage. The play put Notre Dame up 30–7 at the half.

Notre Dame back-ups also saw game action, highlighted by backup quarterback Dayne Crist's 64-yard touchdown to John Goodman in the 4th quarter. Nick Taush also added a 23-yard field goal in the 3rd quarter, setting the Notre Dame record for consecutive field goals at 14. Clausen would finish the game 22–27, 268 yards and two touchdowns. Golden Tate would finish with 141 total yards and two touchdowns. Robert Hughes, starting in place for the injured Armando Allen, racked up 131 yards and a touchdown on 24 carries. Notre Dame's defense also stepped up, holding Washington State to 206 total yards and notching 5 sacks and two interceptions. Notre Dame would finish the game with 592 total yards in the game. Washington State freshman Jeff Tuel was 12-of-23 for 104 yards and two touchdowns and two interceptions.

=== Navy ===
	1	2	3	4	Total
Midshipmen	7	7	7	2	23
#19 Fighting Irish	0	0	7	14	21

Navy ends all hope for Notre Dame's BCS game goals. Navy Defense proved too much for Clausen, Tate and Weis as Navy caused 3 Notre Dame Turnovers and a 4th quarter safety to give the Midshipmen the win. Notre Dame was also unable to stop Navy's Triple Option Offense as Fullback Vince Murray ran for 158 yards with one touchdown and Quarterback Ricky Dobbs added 102 yards with one touchdown as well. Notre Dame loses to Navy for the second time in three years and the second time in a row at Notre Dame stadium.

=== Pittsburgh ===
	1	2	3	4	Total
Fighting Irish	0	3	0	19	22
#8 Panthers	3	7	10	7	27

The Panthers cut short another incredible 4th Quarter comeback by Notre Dame at Hinz Field in Pittsburgh, PA. Johnathan Baldwin got the offense going for the Panthers, making 2 tremendous catches and Freshman Tailback Dion Lewis, who ran for over 150 yards on the Irish. Notre Dame struggled on offense in the first three quarters, only scoring 3 points. However an offense sparked by Jimmy Clausen and Golden Tate, came back down by 18 with 13 minutes left in the 4th quarter to cut the lead down to 5, 27–22, but a controversial fumble call on Jimmy Clausen at the end of the game gave the Panthers their 9th victory of the season and gave the Irish their 4th loss.

=== Connecticut ===
	1	2	3	4	OT	2OT	Total
Huskies	0	10	7	3	7	6	33
Fighting Irish	7	7	3	3	7	3	30

Senior day for the Irish was bitter once again as the Fighting Irish were downed by the Huskies of Connecticut. Connecticut staged an 11-point comeback to tie the game in regulation at 20–20 and would go on to win the game 33–30 in the game's 2nd Overtime. Charlie Weis' seat as the Notre Dame Head Coach got even hotter after this loss to the Huskies and many believed this would be the last home game for Weis.

=== Stanford ===
	1	2	3	4	Total
Fighting Irish	14	10	7	7	38
Cardinal	10	10	7	18	45

After beginning the season with high expectations of a BCS bowl berth, ND ends their season at a once again, Mediocre 6–6. Notre Dame struggled to stop Toby Gerhart, who dismantled the Irish and made his candidacy for the Heisman Trophy even more possible. Notre Dame's offense was electric, scoring 38 points despite the Cardinal owning the Irish on time of possession. Jimmy Clausen passed for nearly 400 yards in the loss with 5 TD's and 0 INT's. A number of things weigh in the balance after the game; Charlie Weis, Jimmy Clausen and Golden Tate's future at Notre Dame and also whether the Irish will participate in a minor post season bowl as they end the season with 6 wins and bowl eligible.

== Post-season ==
Charlie Weis entered this season with the expectation from the Notre Dame administration that his team would be in position to compete for a BCS Bowl berth. Notre Dame started the first part of the season 4–2, with close losses to Michigan and USC. Many of their wins were also close, aside from a 35–0 victory over Nevada and a 40–14 thrashing of Washington State. Sitting at 6–2, however, Notre Dame lost a close game at Notre Dame Stadium to an unranked Navy team, 23–21. This loss was the second to Navy in the last three years, after Notre Dame had beaten Navy forty three straight times dating back to 1963. Notre Dame Athletic Director Jack Swarbrick, when asked about what his biggest disappointment had been that season, took a long pause, then said, "the Navy outcome." While Swarbrick clarified that he would not evaluate the football season until season's end, he stated that "Up until the Navy game we were in the BCS conversation." The Navy game, however, was the first of a four-game losing skid, as Notre Dame followed up the Navy loss with losses to a top-10 Pittsburgh team, an overtime loss to Connecticut at home, and a season ending loss at Stanford. The week prior to the Stanford game, Swarbrick announced Weis would not be recruiting following the game. Weis was fired as head coach the Monday after the Stanford loss. Swarbrick announced that wide receiver coach Rob Ianello would head football operations, including recruiting, until Brian Kelly was named. Although Notre Dame was bowl eligible with 6 wins, the university announced on December 4 that the Irish had chosen not to play in a bowl game.

== Personnel ==
2009 Notre Dame Fighting Irish football team roster
Players
Coaches
Offense

Pos.	#	Name	Class
WR	1	Deion Walker	So
WR	3	Michael Floyd	So
RB	5	Armando Allen	Jr
QB	7	Jimmy Clausen	Jr
TE	9	Kyle Rudolph	So
QB	10	Dayne Crist	So
WR	11	Shaquelle Evans	Fr
QB	13	Evan Sharpley	Sr
QB	15	Brian Castello	Jr
QB	16	Nate Montana	So
QB	17	Matthew Mulvey	So
WR	18	Duval Kamara	Jr
WR	19	George West Jr.	Sr
RB	20	Cierre Wood	Fr
WR	21	Barry Gallup Jr.	Sr
WR	23	Golden Tate	Jr
WR	24	Brian Coughlin	Sr
RB	25	Jonas Gray	So
WR	27	Derry Herlihy	Jr
WR	29	Patrick Coughlin	Jr
FB	30	Steve Paskorz	Jr
RB	32	Theo Riddick	Fr
RB	33	Robert Hughes	Jr
FB	34	James Aldridge	Sr
WR	38	Christopher Gurries	Jr
WR	42	Dan Franco	Sr
FB	47	Mike Narvaez	Sr
C	51	Dan Wenger	Sr
G	52	Braxston Cave	So
C	55	Eric Olsen	Sr
C	57	Mike Golic Jr.	So
G	59	Chris Stewart	Sr
C	62	Bill Flavin	Jr
C	63	Tom Freeman	Fr
G	65	Mike Hernandez	So
G	66	Chris Watt	Fr
G	68	Alex Bullard	Fr
OT	70	Zach Martin	Fr
OL	71	Dennis Mahoney	So
OT	72	Paul Duncan	Sr
OT	73	Lane Clelland	So
OT	74	Sam Young	Sr
OT	75	Taylor Dever	Jr
G	76	Andrew Nuss	Jr
OT	77	Matt Romine	Jr
G	78	Trevor Robinson	So
TE	80	Tyler Eifert	Fr
WR	81	John Goodman	So
WR	82	Robby Parris	Sr
TE	83	Mike Ragone	Jr
WR	84	Roby Toma	Fr
WR	85	Sam Vos	Sr
FB	86	Bobby Burger	Sr
TE	88	Jake Golic	Fr

Defense

Pos.	#	Name	Class
CB	2	Darrin Walls	Sr
CB	4	Gary Gray	Jr
LB	5	Manti Te'o	Fr
S	6	Ray Herring	Sr
CB	8	Raeshon McNeil	Sr
DT	9	Ethan Johnson	So
CB	12	Robert Blanton	So
S	15	Dan McCarthy	So
S	17	Zeke Motta	Fr
S	22	Harrison Smith	Jr
S	24	Leonard Gordon	So
CB	26	Jamoris Slaughter	So
CB	27	E.J. Banks	Fr
S	28	Kyle McCarthy	Sr
CB	29	Michael Garcia	Jr
CB	30	James Redshaw	Jr
S	31	Sergio Brown	Sr
CB	35	Andrew Plaska	So
LB	36	David Posluszny	So
CB	37	Mike Anello	Sr
S	38	Chris Bathon	Sr
CB	39	Ryan Sheehan	Jr
S	40	Thomas Smith	Jr
LB	41	Scott Smith	Sr
CB	42	Nick Lezynski	Jr
CB	43	Joshua Stull	Sr
LB	44	Carlo Calabrese	Fr
LB	45	Darius Fleming	So
LB	46	Steve Filer	So
CB	47	Kael Anderson	Fr
LB	48	Dan Fox	Fr
LB	49	Toryan Smith	Sr
LB	50	Sean Oxley	So
DE	53	Morrice Richardson	Sr
LB	54	Anthony McDonald	So
DE	56	Kerry Neal	Jr
LB	56	Brian Smith	Jr
DL	61	Martin Quintana	Sr
DE	62	Christopher Skubis	Jr
LB	63	Steve Botsford	Jr
LB	64	Tom Burke	Sr
DT	79	Hafis Williams	So
DE	89	Kapron Lewis-Moore	So
DE	90	John Ryan	Sr
DE	91	Emeka Nwankwo	Jr
NT	92	Tyler Stockton	Fr
NT	93	Paddy Mullen	Sr
NT	95	Ian Williams	Jr
DE	97	Kallen Wade	Sr
DT	98	Sean Cwynar	So
NT	99	Brandon Newman	So

Special teams

Pos.	#	Name	Class
K	14	Brandon Walker	Jr
P	35	Ben Turk	Fr
K	39	Ryan Burkhart	Sr
K	40	Nick Tausch	Fr
P	43	Eric Maust	Sr
K	48	David Ruffer	Jr
LS	50	Ryan Kavanagh	So
LS	60	Jordan Cowart	Fr

Head coach

- Charlie Weis

Coordinators/assistant coaches

- Corwin Brown – Associate Head Coach/Co-Defensive Coordinator/Defensive Backs
- Rob Ianello – Assistant Head Coach (Offense)/Wide Receivers/Recruiting Coordinator
- Jon Tenuta – Assistant Head Coach (Defense)/Defensive Coordinator/Linebackers
- Tony Alford – Running Backs
- Randy Hart – Defensive Line
- Bernie Parmalee – Tight Ends
- Brian Polian – Special Teams Coordinator
- Ron Powlus – Quarterbacks
- Frank Verducci – Offensive Line/Running Game Coordinator
- Brian White – Graduate Assistant (Offense)
- Bryant Young – Graduate Assistant (Defense)

Legend

- (C) Team captain
- (S) Suspended
- (I) Ineligible
- Injured
- Redshirt

=== Recruiting ===
The Irish added 18 players to its roster with high school recruits. Included in the class were five-star linebacker Manti Te'o (top defensive player in the nation), four star runningback Cierre Wood, and five-star offensive lineman Chris Watt. The class was named No. 11 by Rivals, No. 14 by ESPN and No. 23 by Scout.

College recruiting (2009)
Name	Hometown	School	Height	Weight	40^{‡}	Commit date
E.J. Banks; S	Pittsburgh, PA	Montour HS	5 ft 11 in (1.80 m)	181 lb (82 kg)	4.5	Aug 8, 2008
E.J. Banks; S	Recruit ratings: Scout: Rivals: (81)					
Alex Bullard; OL	Franklin, TN	Brentwood Academy	6 ft 3 in (1.91 m)	275 lb (125 kg)	5.0	Jun 6, 2008
Alex Bullard; OL	Recruit ratings: Scout: Rivals: (77)					
Carlo Calabrese; LB	Verona, NJ	Verona HS	6 ft 2 in (1.88 m)	225 lb (102 kg)	4.6	May 21, 2008
Carlo Calabrese; LB	Recruit ratings: Scout: Rivals: (78)					
Jordan Cowart; LS	Plantation, FL	St. Thomas Aquinas	6 ft 2 in (1.88 m)	220 lb (100 kg)	–	Dec 7, 2008
Jordan Cowart; LS	Recruit ratings: Scout: Rivals: (77)					
Tyler Eifert; TE	Fort Wayne, IN	Bishop Dwenger	6 ft 6 in (1.98 m)	220 lb (100 kg)	4.62	Jul 8, 2008
Tyler Eifert; TE	Recruit ratings: Scout: Rivals: (79)					
Shaquelle Evans; WR	Inglewood, CA	Inglewood HS	6 ft 1 in (1.85 m)	203 lb (92 kg)	4.45	Nov 7, 2008
Shaquelle Evans; WR	Recruit ratings: Scout: Rivals: (83)					
Dan Fox; LB	Rocky River, OH	St. Ignatius	6 ft 4 in (1.93 m)	219 lb (99 kg)	4.6	Jun 5, 2008
Dan Fox; LB	Recruit ratings: Scout: Rivals: (76)					
Jake Golic; TE	Avon, CT	Northwest Catholic	6 ft 4 in (1.93 m)	220 lb (100 kg)	4.68	Apr 5, 2008
Jake Golic; TE	Recruit ratings: Scout: Rivals: (76)					
Zack Martin; OL	Indianapolis, IN	Bishop Chatard	6 ft 5 in (1.96 m)	265 lb (120 kg)	5.05	Jul 20, 2008
Zack Martin; OL	Recruit ratings: Scout: Rivals: (81)					
Zeke Motta; LB	Vero Beach, FL	Vero Beach HS	6 ft 2 in (1.88 m)	208.5 lb (94.6 kg)	4.625	Oct 9, 2008
Zeke Motta; LB	Recruit ratings: Scout: Rivals: (79)					
Theo Riddick; RB	Manville, NJ	Immaculata HS	5 ft 10 in (1.78 m)	185 lb (84 kg)	4.4	Apr 23, 2008
Theo Riddick; RB	Recruit ratings: Scout: Rivals: (78)					
Tyler Stockton; DL	Linwood, NJ	The Hun School	6 ft 1 in (1.85 m)	290 lb (130 kg)	4.99	Apr 19, 2008
Tyler Stockton; DL	Recruit ratings: Scout: Rivals: (83)					
Nick Tausch; K	Plano, TX	Jesuit College Prep HS	6 ft 1 in (1.85 m)	180 lb (82 kg)	–	Jun 17, 2008
Nick Tausch; K	Recruit ratings: Scout: Rivals: (74)					
Manti Te'o; LB	Laie, HI	Punahou HS	6 ft 2 in (1.88 m)	225 lb (102 kg)	4.575	Feb 4, 2009
Manti Te'o; LB	Recruit ratings: Scout: Rivals: (93)					
Robby Toma; WR	Laie, HI	Punahou HS	5 ft 10 in (1.78 m)	175 lb (79 kg)	4.45	Feb 5, 2009
Robby Toma; WR	Recruit ratings: Scout: Rivals: (68)					
Ben Turk; P	Davie, FL	St. Thomas Aquinas	6 ft 0 in (1.83 m)	190 lb (86 kg)	–	Jun 12, 2008
Ben Turk; P	Recruit ratings: Scout: Rivals: (79)					
Chris Watt; OL	Glen Ellyn, IL	Glenbard West HS	6 ft 3 in (1.91 m)	280 lb (130 kg)	–	Jul 13, 2008
Chris Watt; OL	Recruit ratings: Scout: Rivals: (82)					
Cierre Wood; RB	Oxnard, CA	Santa Clara HS	6 ft 0 in (1.83 m)	192 lb (87 kg)	4.5	Apr 19, 2008
Cierre Wood; RB	Recruit ratings: Scout: Rivals: (81)					
Overall recruit ranking: Scout: #23 Rivals: #11
‡ Refers to 40-yard dash; Note: In many cases, Scout, Rivals, 247Sports, On3, and ESPN may conflict in their listings of height, weight and 40 time.; In these cases, the average was taken. ESPN grades are on a 100-point scale.; Sources: "Notre Dame Commit List 2009". Rivals.; "Scout.com Football Recruiting: Notre Dame". Scout.; "2009 Player Commitments – Notre Dame". ESPN.; "Scout.com Team Recruiting Rankings". Scout.; "2009 Team Ranking". Rivals.com.

== Awards and honors ==
- Biletnikoff Award

Golden Tate

All-Americans
Name	AP	UPI	NEA	AFCA	SN	FWAA	FN	WCFF	CW	CBS
Jimmy Clausen, QB					3					
Eric Olsen, OC					3					
Golden Tate, WR †	1			1	1	1		1		1
†denotes unanimous selection, Sources:
