= David Grimes (American football) =

American football player (born 1986)

Profile
- Position: Wide receiver

Personal information
- Born: December 31, 1986 (age 39); Los Angeles, California, U.S.
- Listed height: 5 ft 10 in (1.78 m)
- Listed weight: 183 lb (83 kg)

Career information
- High school: Detroit (MI) Saint Martin de Porres
- College: Notre Dame
- NFL draft: 2009: undrafted

Career history

Playing
- Denver Broncos (2009)*; Kansas City Chiefs (2010)*
- * Offseason or practice squad member only

Coaching
- Notre Dame (2011–2020); Player Development Intern (2011); Assistant Strength & Conditioning Coach (2012–2020)

David Michael Grimes (born December 31, 1986) is an American former football wide receiver. Grimes played wide receiver for Notre Dame. He is currently assistant strength and conditioning coach at the University of Notre Dame.

== Early life ==
David attended St. Martin de Porres High School in Detroit, Michigan. David graduated at the top of his class, earning valedictorian distinction for the class of 2005.

== College career ==
As a freshman, Grimes Played in all 12 games, primarily on special teams, and won a monogram. He also emerged as Notre Dame's top kickoff return man. As a sophomore, Grimes served as the 3rd receiver in a rotation with Jeff Samardzija and Rhema McKnight. As a junior, Grimes missed a few games with injury, but otherwise, he was a starter and one of the team's leading receivers. Grimes was elected team captain for the 2008 season along with Maurice Crum Jr. and David Bruton.

== Professional career ==
Grimes signed with the Denver Broncos as an undrafted free agent, but was later released by the team on July 23, 2009.

On May 4, 2010, David Grimes signed with the Kansas City Chiefs. He was later waived on July 31, 2010
