= Jessica Gysin =

American volleyball player (born 1985)

Personal information
- Nationality: American
- Born: December 4, 1985 (age 40) Santa Cruz, California
- Height: 6 ft 1 in (1.85 m)

Sport
- Country: United States
- Sport: Volleyball

Jessica Ann Gysin (born December 4, 1985) is an American volleyball player. She went to St. Francis High in Mountain View, California and played collegiately for USC. Gysin plays as Outside Hitter. She was born in Santa Cruz, California. She is married to former NFL quarterback Jimmy Clausen.
