= 2008 Hawaii Bowl =

2008 Sheraton Hawaii Bowl
Hawaii Warriors	Notre Dame Fighting Irish
(7–6)	(6–6)
WAC	Independent
21	49
Head coach: Greg McMackin	Head coach: Charlie Weis
	1	2	3	4	Total
Hawaii	0	7	7	7	21
Notre Dame	7	21	21	0	49
- Date: December 24, 2008
- Season: 2008
- Stadium: Aloha Stadium
- Location: Honolulu, Hawaii
- MVP: QB Jimmy Clausen (Notre Dame); WR Golden Tate (Notre Dame); WR Aaron Bain (Hawai'i)
- Favorite: Notre Dame by 1½
- Referee: Stan Evans (MAC)
- Attendance: 45,718 (tickets sold); 43,487 (turnstile)
- Payout: US$750,000 per team

United States TV coverage
- Network: ESPN
- Announcers: Dave Pasch, Andre Ware
- Nielsen ratings: 2.6

The 2008 Sheraton Hawaii Bowl game was a post-season college football bowl game played on Christmas Eve 2008, at Aloha Stadium in Honolulu between the Hawaiʻi Warriors of the Western Athletic Conference (WAC) against the independent Notre Dame Fighting Irish. The game was part of the 2008–2009 bowl game schedule and was the concluding game of the 2008 NCAA Division I FBS football season for both teams. This seventh edition of the Hawaiʻi Bowl, sponsored by Sheraton Hotels and Resorts, was planned as a matchup between the WAC and Pac-10, however the Pac-10 was not able to supply a bowl-eligible team.

Notre Dame's victory marked its first in the postseason since the Irish defeated Texas A&M in the 1994 Cotton Bowl Classic following the 1993 season, and ended an NCAA record nine-game bowl game losing streak. Notre Dame quarterback Jimmy Clausen broke school bowl game records after passing for 401 yards and five touchdowns, and his 84.6% completion rate was the second-best completion percentage for any player in any bowl game in NCAA history. Wide receiver Golden Tate also set Irish bowl records upon catching for 177 yards and three touchdowns.

The game set the record for the Hawaiʻi Bowl's largest attendance, in both tickets sold and turnstile count, breaking the previous record set at the 2006 edition.

Notre Dame wore player names on the backs of its jerseys for the first time since 1985 season finale at Miami in Gerry Faust's last game as Irish coach.

== Game summary ==
The Irish scored first on a Robert Hughes 2-yard touchdown run, capping a 9 play 87-yard drive. After the Irish defense forced a Hawaiʻi 3-and-out, Irish safety Sergio Brown blocked a Hawaiʻi punt. Notre Dame could not capitalize on the block, in part due to an excessive celebration penalty incurred by Notre Dame after the play that pushed them out of field goal range. After forcing another Hawaiʻi 3-and-out, Clausen connected with senior wide receiver David Grimes for a 14-yard touchdown. The Warriors answered right back, however, driving 56 yards in 6 plays and scoring on a 10-yard Aaron Bain touchdown from Hawaiʻi quarterback Greg Alexander.

With the score at 14–7, Notre Dame proceeded to score 28 unanswered points in the 2nd and 3rd quarters. In the 2nd quarter, Clausen connected with Golden Tate on 69-yard play action pass for a touchdown. After senior safety David Bruton intercepted Greg Alexander, Clausen again connected with Tate for an 18-yard touchdown in the corner of the endzone on a 3rd down and 18 play with :01 second left before the half. In the third quarter, Notre Dame continued to score, on Clausen touchdowns to running back Armando Allen on an 18-yard screen play and to Golden Tate on a 40-yard deep out pass. With the score at 42–7, Hawaiʻi finally scored on another Alexander to Bain touchdown of 18 yards. On the ensuing kickoff, Armando Allen put any Hawaiʻi rally to rest, scoring on a 96-yard touchdown return. Hawaiʻi scored the final touchdown of the game with 2 minutes remaining against Notre Dame reserves.

=== Scoring summary ===
Scoring Play	Score
1st Quarter
ND – Robert Hughes 2 yard TD run (Brandon Walker kick), 3:08	ND 7–0
2nd Quarter
ND – David Grimes 14 yard TD pass from Jimmy Clausen (Walker kick), 10:25	ND 14–0
Hawaiʻi – Aaron Bain 10 yard TD pass from Greg Alexander (Daniel Kelly kick), 8:12	ND 14–7
ND – Golden Tate 69 yard TD pass from Clausen (Walker kick), 6:49	ND 21–7
ND – Tate 18 yard TD pass from Clausen (Walker kick), :01	ND 28–7
3rd Quarter
ND – Armando Allen 18 yard TD pass from Clausen (Walker kick), 10:50	ND 35–7
ND – Tate 40 yard TD pass from Clausen (Walker kick), 7:22	ND 42–7
Hawaiʻi – Bain 21 yard TD pass from Alexander (Kelly kick), 4:25	ND 42–14
ND – Allen 96 yard kickoff return (Walker kick), 4:12	ND 49–14
4th Quarter
Hawaiʻi – Michael Washington 27 yard TD pass from Inoke Funaki (Kelly kick), 1:45	ND 49–21
