= Jimmy Clausen =

American football player (born 1987)

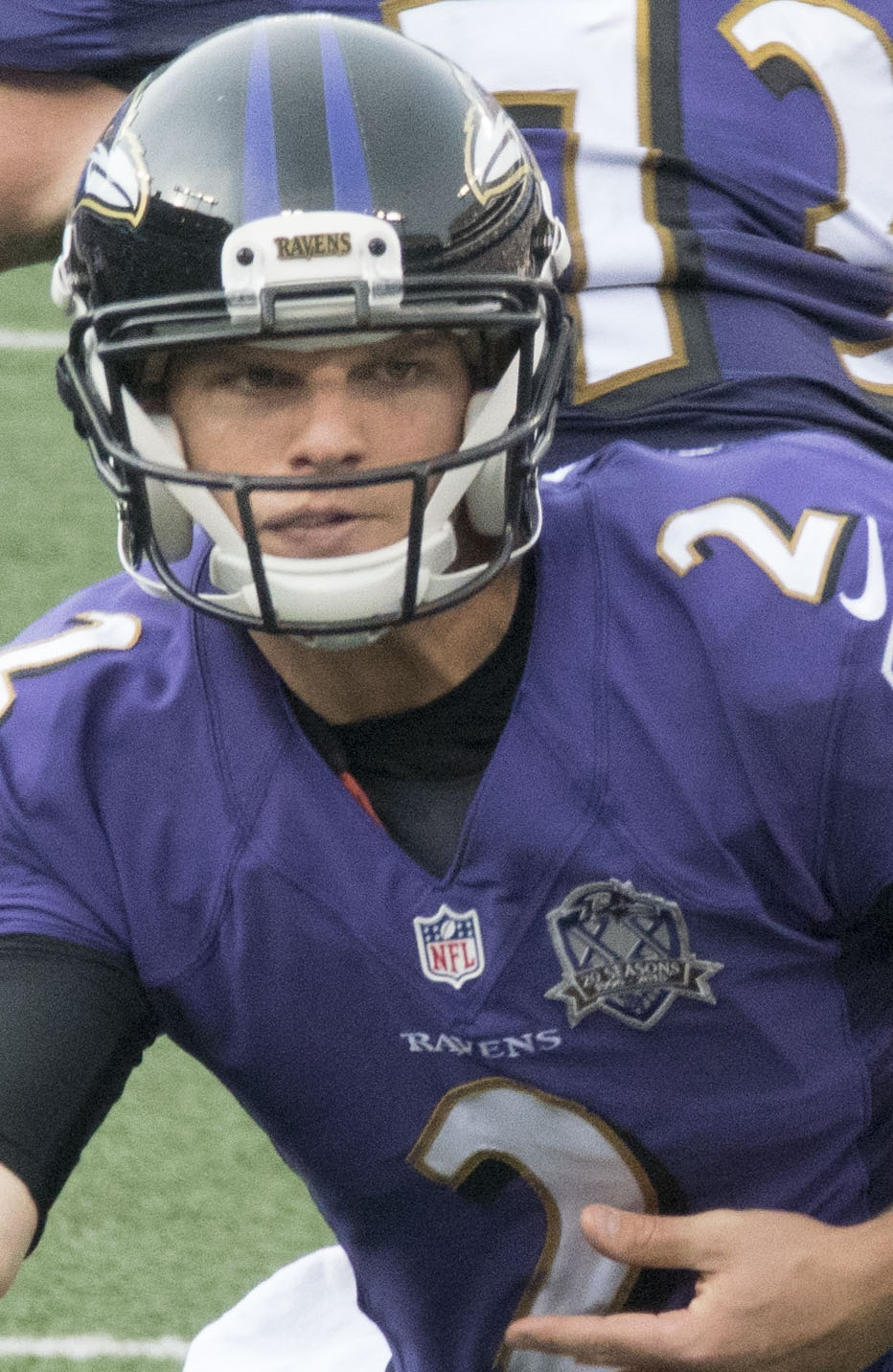
- Clausen with the Baltimore Ravens in 2015

No. 2, 8
- Position: Quarterback

Personal information
- Born: September 21, 1987 (age 39); Thousand Oaks, California, U.S.
- Listed height: 6 ft 3 in (1.91 m)
- Listed weight: 217 lb (98 kg)

Career information
- High school: Oaks Christian School (Westlake Village, California)
- College: Notre Dame (2007–2009)
- NFL draft: 2010: 2nd round, 48th overall pick

Career history
- Carolina Panthers (2010–2013); Chicago Bears (2014–2015); Baltimore Ravens (2015)

Awards and highlights
- Third-team All-American (2009)

Career NFL statistics
- Passing attempts: 472
- Passing completions: 255
- Completion percentage: 54.0%
- TD–INT: 7–14
- Passing yards: 2,520
- Passer rating: 61.9
- Stats at Pro Football Reference

James Richard Clausen (born September 21, 1987) is an American former professional football player who was a quarterback in the National Football League (NFL) from 2010 to 2015. He played college football for the Notre Dame Fighting Irish and was selected by the Carolina Panthers in the second round of the 2010 NFL draft.

After compiling a 1–9 record as the Panthers' starting quarterback during his rookie season, Clausen remained with the team for three more seasons without seeing any game action. He then spent parts of the 2014 and 2015 seasons as a backup for the Chicago Bears and Baltimore Ravens.

== Early life ==
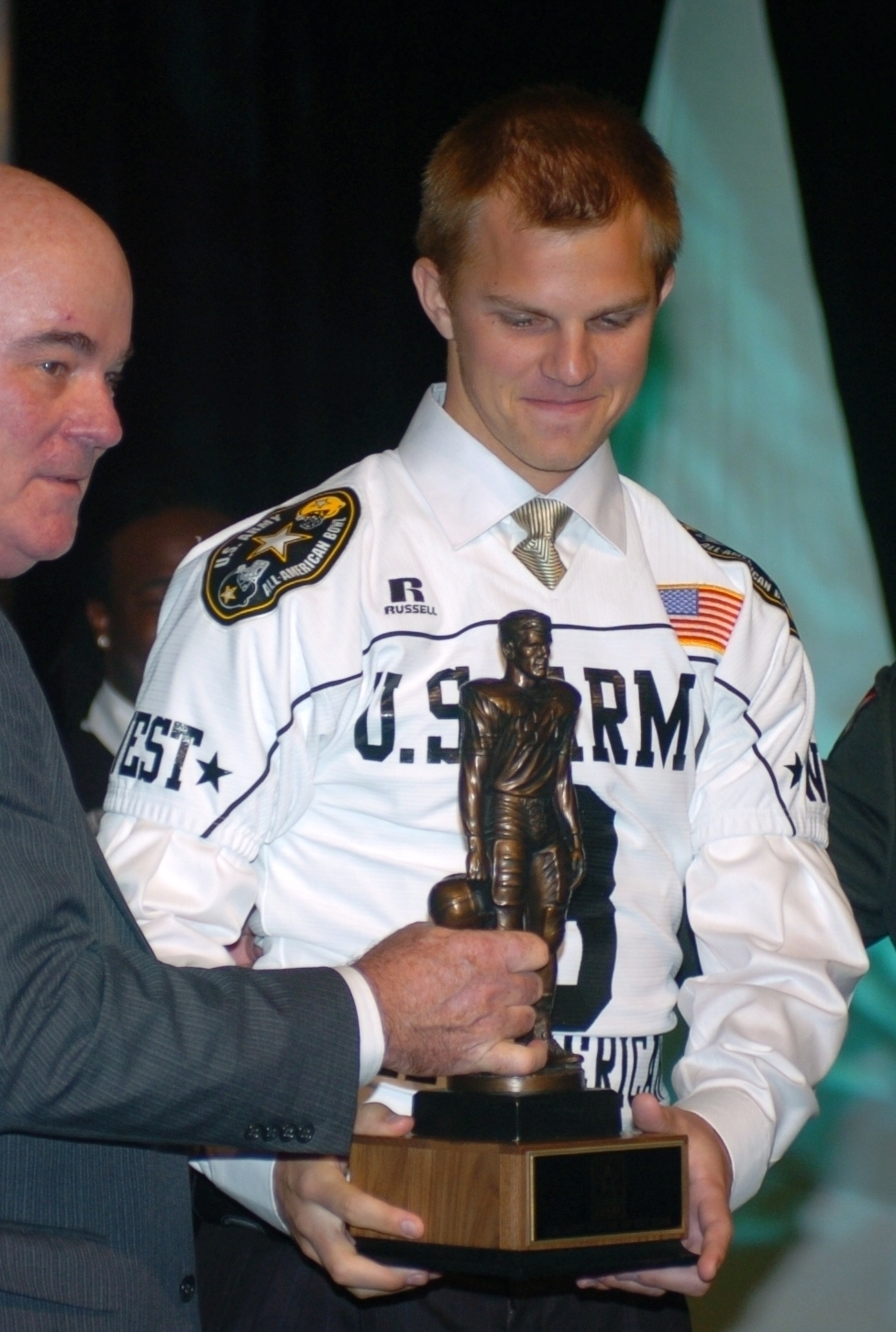
Clausen wins the 2006 Hall Trophy, January 2007

Clausen had an outstanding prep career at Oaks Christian School in Westlake Village, California. In 2006, he threw 49 touchdown passes for the season to lead the Lions to their first ever Division III state title over Cardinal Newman High School (Santa Rosa, CA). Clausen never lost a football game he started in his prep career (42–0). He threw for 10,677 yards in his career at Oaks Christian. As a senior, Clausen won the 2006 Hall Trophy for the nation's top high school football player and was also named "Offensive Player of the Year" by the USA Today. Clausen was also named the Co Player of the Year, along with USC running back Joe McKnight, by Parade Magazine.

As the younger brother of two former NCAA Division I quarterbacks—Casey and Rick Clausen, who both played at Tennessee—Jimmy Clausen gained media attention very early. Beginning in eighth grade, his parents paid his tutelage under professional quarterbacks coach Steve Clarkson. During his junior season, a Sports Illustrated feature dubbed him "The Kid with The Golden Arm". Recruiting analysts considered him a "once in a decade" quarterback talent and ranked him as the #1 overall prospect of the 2007 high school class. Because of his quick release, some in the media compared him to Joe Namath.

Critics have questioned whether Clausen's success in high school was largely a product of his team—containing almost a dozen players that went on to play for NCAA Division I Bowl Subdivision teams, including a highly ranked running back, Marc Tyler—and the inferior talent level of its opponents. Many of these critics pointed to the 2007 U.S. Army All-American Bowl in which Clausen was outplayed by fellow 2007 quarterback recruit, Ryan Mallett. Further, Clausen's age is a subject of criticism: he started kindergarten at six and repeated sixth grade, thus he was 19 years old at the time of his early graduation.

On April 22, 2006, Clausen verbally committed to the University of Notre Dame. He was the most highly touted recruit for the Fighting Irish since the arrival of Ron Powlus in 1993. Clausen announced his verbal commitment at the College Football Hall of Fame in South Bend, Indiana, after arriving in a stretch Hummer limousine. He also said his goal was to win multiple national titles with the Irish.

== College career ==
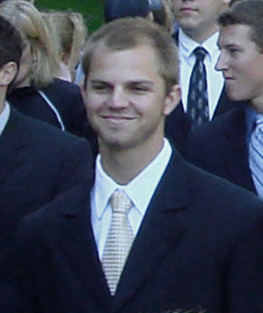
Clausen in 2007

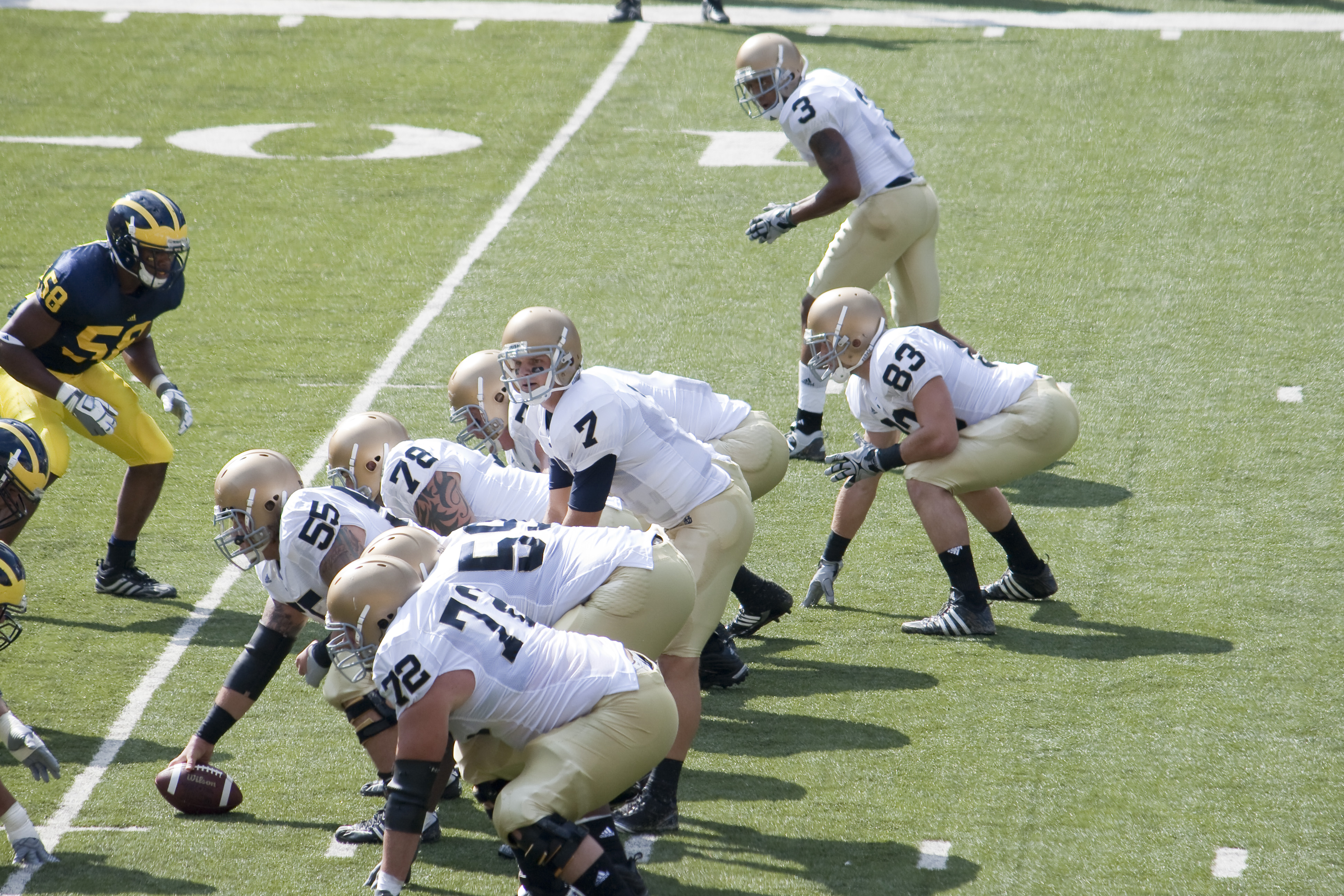
Clausen while playing quarterback at Notre Dame, takes a snap against Michigan in 2009

Clausen, who graduated from high school one semester early, enrolled at Notre Dame on January 16, 2007. In Notre Dame's only preseason practice open to the media, Clausen threw only a number of short passes, casting some doubt on the strength of his arm after off-season elbow surgery.

Following Notre Dame's opening loss to Georgia Tech in the 2007 season, Clausen was named the starting quarterback, but would win only one of his first six starts (against UCLA) and was replaced by backup quarterback Evan Sharpley during Notre Dame's loss to Boston College on October 13, 2007. Citing non-specific injuries to Clausen (who had been sacked 23 times), head coach Charlie Weis named Sharpley as the starting quarterback for Notre Dame's game against USC on October 20, 2007. After sitting out Notre Dame's losses to USC and Navy, Clausen was again named the starter for their game against Air Force.

Clausen finished his freshman year having completed 56.3% of his passes for 1,254 yards, with 7 touchdowns (plus two rushing TDs) and 6 interceptions and a passing efficiency of 103.85, and he was sacked a team-record 34 times.

During his sophomore season, he completed 60.9% of his passes for 3172 yards, 25 touchdowns and 17 interceptions and a 132.5 efficiency rating which placed him as the 44th ranked quarterback in NCAA Division I FBS. He led the Fighting Irish to a 7–6 record, culminating in a 49–21 victory against Hawaii in the Hawaii Bowl — which ended Notre Dame's NCAA-record nine-game bowl losing streak. Clausen set Notre Dame bowl records with 406 yards passing and five touchdowns and was named the bowl's co-MVP.

In his junior season, Clausen was named midseason All-American by Sporting News. He finished the season with 3,722 yards passing, a 68.8% completion rate, 161.42 passer rating, 28 touchdowns, and four interceptions.

On Monday, December 7, 2009, Clausen declared that he would forgo his senior season at Notre Dame and enter the NFL draft following news of the firing of head coach Charlie Weis.

Clausen returned to Notre Dame during the 2011 off-season to finish his degree in sociology.

== Professional career ==
=== Pre-draft ===
Clausen announced his intention to enter the 2010 NFL draft on December 7, 2009. Clausen was expected to be one of the top quarterbacks available in the draft, along with former Heisman Trophy winner Sam Bradford. He was projected by many to be a Top-10 pick. Surprisingly, however, he was not selected in the first round of the draft, with Bradford and Florida's Tim Tebow selected ahead of him.

Pre-draft measurables
Height	Weight	Arm length	Hand span	Wonderlic
6 ft 2 5/8 in (1.90 m)	222 lb (101 kg)	30 3/4 in (0.78 m)	9 in (0.23 m)	23
All values from NFL Combine

=== Carolina Panthers ===
Clausen was selected by the Carolina Panthers with the 16th pick of the 2nd round (48th overall). Analysts attributed his slide to his cocky demeanor and "persnickety smirkness." On July 28, 2010, he signed a four-year, $4.2 million contract with the Panthers, which includes $2.53 million in guarantees. Clausen made his NFL debut in a loss against the New York Giants in the 2010 season opener, after starting quarterback Matt Moore was sidelined with a concussion. After poor play by Matt Moore in a week 2 matchup against the Buccaneers, Clausen took over late in the game. He completed 7 of 13 passes for 59 yards and an interception and one fumbled snap, and led a 17-play drive that was stopped inside the 5-yard line. The following week, Clausen started his first NFL game against the Bengals, completing 16 of 33 passes for 188 yards and an interception and three fumbled snaps, losing two. During the game TV cameras caught wide receiver Steve Smith walking over to Clausen, who was talking with an assistant coach, and screaming at the rookie. Smith walked away, but returned and said something else before being escorted away by tight end Jeff King. At that point, Smith threw down a cup of Gatorade. The incident was later downplayed by Smith. It was the second time there had been communication issues between Smith and Clausen. On May 6, 2010, a report on the website "Pro Football Talk" stated that, "Steve Smith 'basically thinks Jimmy is a punk.'" The website later reported that Smith sent a text message to Clausen that the report was "B.S.". In Clausen's 2nd NFL start (a week 4 match-up against the New Orleans Saints), Clausen went 11 of 21 for 146 yards and completed his 1st NFL touchdown pass to RB Jonathan Stewart.

After just three NFL starts and being pulled in week 5, Clausen was benched after completing 47 percent of his passes with one touchdown and three interceptions. Clausen also fumbled seven times, losing two, and had a 52.2 passer rating. Clausen finished the 2010 season with 157 completions out of 299 attempts (52.5%), 1,558 yards with 3 touchdowns and 9 interceptions. He was sacked 33 times and fumbled 9 times, losing two.

In 2011, the Panthers used their number one overall draft pick to select Cam Newton of Auburn. After a four-game preseason competition, Panthers coaches decided that Newton would be named the starter for the 2011 NFL season. Clausen had no improvement over his 2010 regular season performance in the 2011 preseason, finishing 24/46 passing (52.2%) and 260 yards and a 5.70 average with 1 touchdown and 2 interceptions and was sacked 7 times in 53 dropbacks and had a quarterback rating of 58.2, similar to his 2010 regular season performance. The Panthers also signed veteran QB Derek Anderson to the team. Clausen was then demoted to third string.

In the 2012 pre-season, Clausen was 19 for 37 (51.4%) 252 yards and two touchdowns and like 2011 never took the field in regular season play. On August 31, 2013, the Panthers waived an injured Clausen. He passed through waivers unclaimed, and ended up on the Panthers' injured reserve list.

=== Chicago Bears ===
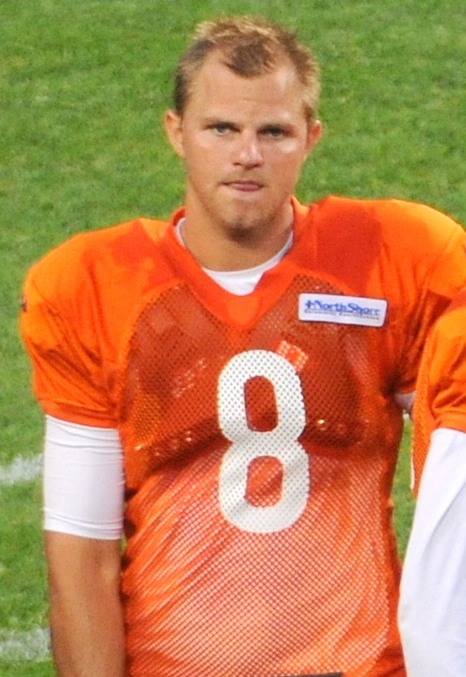
Clausen with the Bears in 2014

Clausen was signed by the Chicago Bears on June 5, 2014. During the preseason he competed with Jordan Palmer for the second string spot; Clausen eventually won the job.

On December 17, Marc Trestman announced that Clausen would take over the starting quarterback position from Jay Cutler. Clausen completed 26 of 48 passes for 181 yards, two touchdowns, one interception and a 77 passer rating in a 20–14 loss to the Detroit Lions. During the game's fourth quarter, Ezekiel Ansah collided with Clausen in a helmet-to-helmet collision. Ansah was penalized and later fined, while Clausen was later diagnosed with a concussion. He relinquished his starting role to Cutler, who played in the Bears' season finale.

On March 6, 2015, Clausen re-signed on a one-year deal. He started the third game of the season against the Seattle Seahawks, completing 9 of 17 passes for 63 yards, and including sacks, recorded 48 net passing yards, the second time since the 1990 season that the Bears had less than 50 net yards passing, as they lost 26–0.

On November 23, 2015, he was waived.

=== Baltimore Ravens ===
On November 24, 2015, Clausen was claimed off waivers by the Baltimore Ravens. On December 13, Clausen started against the Seattle Seahawks, replacing the injured Matt Schaub, who was in turn replacing the injured Joe Flacco. Clausen completed 23-of-40 passes for 274 yards, no touchdowns and one interception in a 35–6 loss. He also started in a December 20 game against the Kansas City Chiefs, in which he completed 26-of-45 passes for 281 yards, with two touchdowns and two interceptions, in the 34–14 loss. Clausen was then benched for Ryan Mallett, who led the Ravens to a 20–17 upset win over the rival Pittsburgh Steelers the following week.

== Career statistics ==
=== NFL ===
Year	Team	Games		Passing								Rushing			
Year	Team	GP	GS	Cmp	Att	Pct	Yds	Avg	TD	Int	Rtg	Att	Yds	Avg	TD
2010	CAR	13	10	157	299	52.5	1,558	5.2	3	9	58.4	23	57	2.5	0
2011	CAR	0	0	DNP											
2012	CAR	0	0	DNP											
2013	CAR	0	0	DNP											
2014	CHI	4	1	26	48	54.2	223	4.6	2	1	71.8	3	9	3.0	0
2015	CHI	2	1	23	40	57.5	184	4.6	0	1	58.7	5	8	1.6	0
2015	BAL	2	2	49	85	57.6	555	6.5	2	3	70.5	6	28	4.7	0
Career		21	14	255	472	54.0	2,520	5.4	7	14	61.9	37	102	2.8	0

=== College ===
Season	Team	Passing								Rushing			
Season	Team	Cmp	Att	Pct	Yds	Y/A	TD	Int	Rtg	Att	Yds	Avg	TD
2007	Notre Dame	138	245	56.3	1,254	5.1	7	6	103.9	62	−187	−3.0	2
2008	Notre Dame	268	440	60.9	3,172	7.2	25	17	132.5	54	−73	−1.4	0
2009	Notre Dame	289	425	68.0	3,722	8.8	28	4	161.4	59	−95	−1.6	3
Career		695	1,110	62.6	8,148	7.3	60	27	137.2	175	−355	−2.0	5

== Awards and honors ==
College

- 2008 Hawaii Bowl Co-MVP with Golden Tate
- 2009 Second-team All-America (CBS Sportsline)
- 2009 Third-team All-America (TSN)

High school

- 2006 Hall Trophy
- 2006 USA Today Offensive Player of the Year

== Legal trouble ==
On June 23, 2007, Clausen was cited for illegal transportation of alcohol in South Bend, Indiana. He was driving someone who was not of legal drinking age to a liquor store to buy alcohol. According to published reports, Clausen entered a pre-trial diversion program that erased the citation since he stayed out of trouble for the following 12 months.

On November 22, 2009, Clausen was involved in an altercation outside of a South Bend bar. Sources indicate that Clausen was there with family and teammates following the team's senior day loss to Connecticut. It was reported that upon his departure, Clausen was punched in the face outside of the pub. A South Bend Police Department spokesperson stated that no police report was filed over that weekend involving Clausen. Reports indicate that Clausen was left with a black eye, which was clearly visible in the broadcast of Notre Dame's next football game. A later report of this incident indicated that the other subject involved in this incident allegedly shoved Clausen's girlfriend. It was reported that Clausen then shoved the subject away prior to Clausen being punched.

== Personal life ==
Clausen is married to former volleyball player Jessica Gysin. They married over Valentine's Day weekend in 2015.
