= Mario Brown =

American basketball player

Mario Brown (c. 1951 – October 5, 2002), known as "Bro' Rap", was the first African-American men's basketball player at Texas A&M University.

== Early life and education ==
Mario Brown attended Parker High School in Chicago, Illinois. As a senior, Brown was named the most valuable player of the school's basketball team and earned all-district honors. He was also president of the school's student council and played on the baseball team.

After graduating from high school, Brown played basketball for two years for Kennedy–King College in Chicago.

== Texas A&M University ==
Brown was recruited by Texas A&M coach Shelby Metcalf, who travelled to Chicago, Illinois to personally ask Brown to attend the school. Brown played for two seasons at A&M, starting in 51 games and averaging 14 points and 4.3 assists per game. In his first season, 1971–1972, Brown earned second team All-Southwest Conference honors, leading A&M with a 16.9 scoring average in conference play and helping the team to a 16–10 record. The following year, his senior year, Brown was selected as team co-captain, and averaged 13.4 points and 4 assists per game as the Aggies ranked second in the Southwest Conference and finished with a 17–9 record.

Brown was a very fast player with a great crossover dribble.

== Later years ==
Brown died of lung cancer one month after his diagnosis in 2002. He was survived by his wife, Myrtle, and several children, including Nick Brown, a USA Junior National Champion in track and field who had much success in track and field at the University of Illinois, and Sergio Brown, a football safety who played in the NFL with four teams, including the New England Patriots. And Son Mario Brown Jr. He leaves behind his grandchildren Aszja Brown, Avanti Brown, and Mario Brown III
