= Asaph Schwapp =

American football player (1987–2013)

No. 44
- Position: Fullback

Personal information
- Born: January 26, 1987; Hartford, Connecticut, U.S.
- Died: May 8, 2013 (aged 26)
- Listed height: 6 ft 0 in (1.83 m)
- Listed weight: 252 lb (114 kg)

Career information
- High school: Weaver (Hartford)
- College: Notre Dame
- NFL draft: 2009: undrafted

Career history
- Dallas Cowboys (2009)*; Hartford Colonials (2010–2011)
- * Offseason or practice squad member only

Asaph Daniel Schwapp (January 26, 1987 – May 8, 2013) was an American football fullback.

Schwapp was born and raised in Hartford, Connecticut. He played high school football at Weaver High School in Hartford where he earned first team all-state honors and named Gatorade Player of the Year in Connecticut in 2004 as a junior. He also played inside linebacker. He attended and played football at The University of Notre Dame. He entered the NFL signing as an undrafted free agent by the Dallas Cowboys in 2009 but was cut before the regular season began.

In 2010, he signed with the Hartford Colonials after he was drafted in the eighth round (40th overall) of the 2010 UFL draft. On August 10, 2011, the Colonials were contracted by the UFL, thus Schwapp became a free agent.

On May 8, 2013, Schwapp died after battling non-Hodgkin's lymphoma.
