= Sergio Brown =

American football player (born 1988)

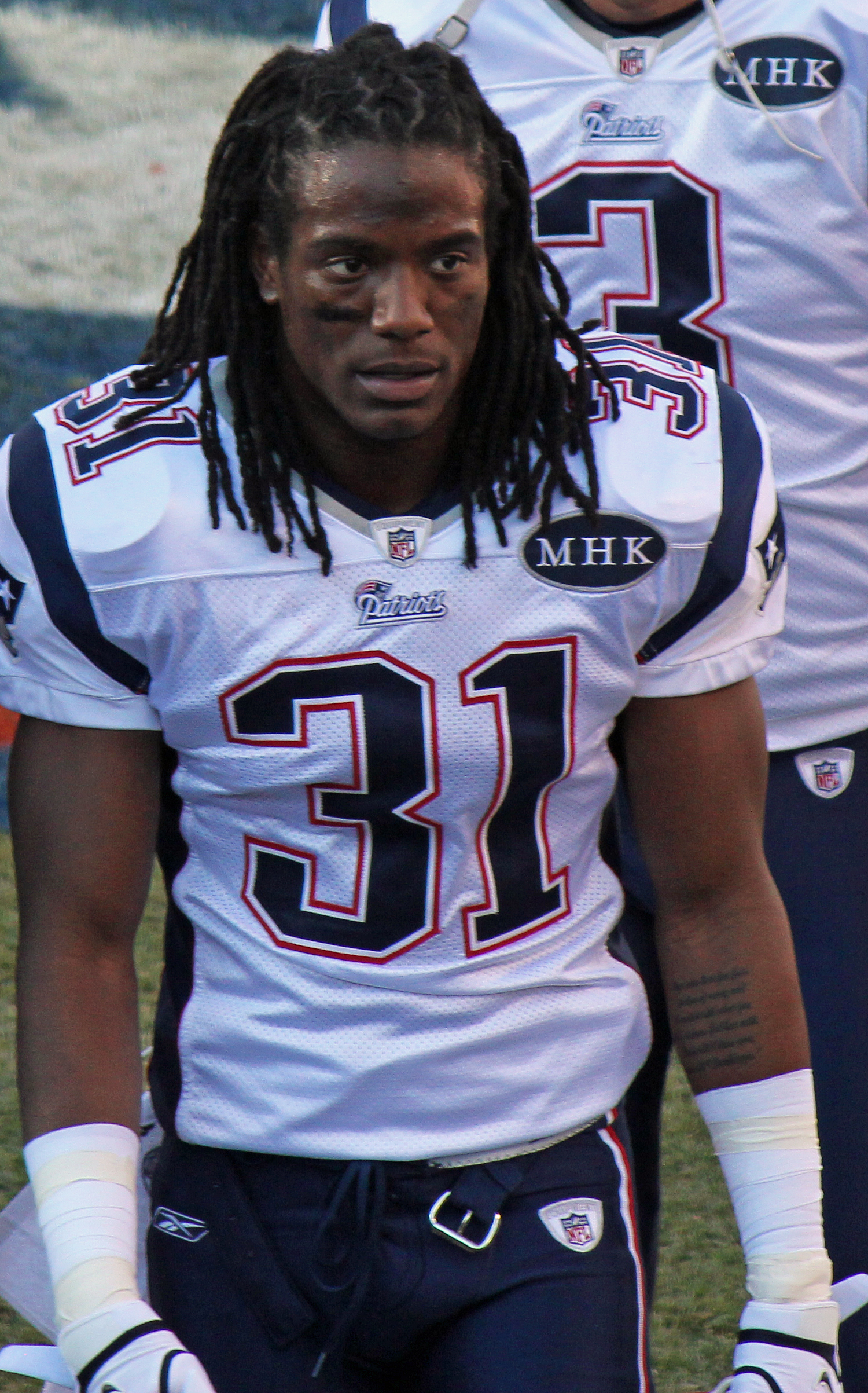
- Brown in 2011 with the New England Patriots

No. 31, 38
- Position: Safety

Personal information
- Born: May 22, 1988 (age 38); Maywood, Illinois, U.S.
- Listed height: 6 ft 2 in (1.88 m)
- Listed weight: 207 lb (94 kg)

Career information
- High school: Proviso East (Maywood)
- College: Notre Dame
- NFL draft: 2010: undrafted

Career history
- New England Patriots (2010–2011); Indianapolis Colts (2012–2014); Jacksonville Jaguars (2015); Atlanta Falcons (2016)*; Buffalo Bills (2016)
- * Offseason or practice squad member only

Career NFL statistics
- Total tackles: 144
- Sacks: 2.5
- Fumble recoveries: 4
- Pass deflections: 10
- Interceptions: 1
- Stats at Pro Football Reference

Sergio Brown (born May 22, 1988) is an American former professional football player who was a safety in the National Football League (NFL) for seven seasons. He played college football for the Notre Dame Fighting Irish and was signed by the New England Patriots as an undrafted free agent after the 2010 NFL draft. He was also a member of the Indianapolis Colts, Jacksonville Jaguars, and Buffalo Bills.

Brown attended Proviso East High School in Maywood, Illinois, where he played as a wide receiver and defensive end. Following high school, he chose to play college football for the University of Notre Dame after receiving scholarship offers from several major Division I programs. Brown was a reserve for his first two seasons before being named a starter in his junior year, where he appeared in 13 games including a victory against the Hawaii Rainbow Warriors in the 2008 Hawaii Bowl. In his senior season, he led all FBS Independent schools in forced fumbles. After going undrafted in the following year's draft, Brown signed with the Patriots in April 2010. He last played professional football in the 2016 NFL season.

In September 2023, Brown was reported missing after his mother was found dead outside of her home; he was later located in Mexico. During the period of his disappearance, Brown posted several cryptic messages on social media. In October 2023, Brown was apprehended by Mexican authorities. He was later extradited to the United States and arrested on charges of first-degree murder and concealing a homicide.

== Early life ==
Sergio Brown was born on May 22, 1988, in Maywood, Illinois (Note: ESPN lists Brown's birthplace as Oak Park, Illinois.) to Myrtle Simmons and Mario Brown. His father was the first African-American basketball player at Texas A&M. His older brother, Nick, was a USA Junior National Champion in track and field and competed at the University of Illinois.

Brown attended Proviso East High School in Maywood, where he starred in football, basketball, and track and field. He played wide receiver, safety, quarterback, placekicker, and punter for Proviso alongside future professional basketball player Brian Carlwell. As a senior, he recorded eight touchdowns as a receiver, five interceptions for touchdown returns as a safety, and was named a Second Team All-State defensive pick by the Chicago Tribune. Brown was also a standout track and field athlete; in his senior year, he was a state qualifier in the long jump, achieving a career-best leap of 21 feet, 9 inches and recording a 4.38 second 40-yard dash.

Brown did not initially attract much attention from recruiters; by the end of May 2005, he had not received a scholarship offer. However, following an impressive performance at a Nike combine in Michigan, Brown received offers from several Division I football programs, including Notre Dame, Illinois, Iowa, Nebraska, Minnesota, Northwestern, and Purdue. He was evaluated as a three-star recruit and ranked 32nd nationally at his position by Rivals.com, while 247Sports ranked him as the 31st best safety recruit in the nation. On September 27, 2005, Brown committed to Notre Dame.

College recruiting
Name	Hometown	School	Height	Weight	40^{‡}	Commit date
Sergio Brown; Safety	Maywood, Illinois	Proviso East High School	6 ft 1 in (1.85 m)	184 lb (83 kg)	4.38	Sep 27, 2005
Sergio Brown; Safety	Recruit ratings: Rivals: 247Sports: (77)					
Overall recruit ranking: Rivals: 32 (S), 9 (Illinois) 247Sports: 31 (S), 7 (Illinois) ESPN: 46 (S)
‡ Refers to 40-yard dash; Note: In many cases, Scout, Rivals, 247Sports, On3, and ESPN may conflict in their listings of height, weight and 40 time.; In these cases, the average was taken. ESPN grades are on a 100-point scale.; Sources: "2006 Notre Dame Football Commitment List". Rivals.; "2006 Team Ranking". Rivals.com.; "Sergio Brown". 247Sports.

== College career ==
As a true freshman at Notre Dame, Brown played in eleven of twelve games as a substitute strong safety and gunner. For the 2006 season, he recorded a total of three solo tackles and one assisted tackle over three games against Georgia Tech, Stanford, and Air Force. As a sophomore, Brown remained a substitute, playing in nine games as the team finished with a record low 3-9 win–loss record. He recorded four solo and three assisted tackles for a total of seven over six games against Georgia Tech, Penn State, Purdue, UCLA, Boston College, and USC.

Brown was promoted to starting nickel back safety in his junior season and played in all twelve regular season games. In his first career start against San Diego State, Brown made a season-high six total tackles and deflected two passes in a 21–13 victory. The Fighting Irish improved their record from the previous year, finishing with a balanced 6–6 record. This performance secured them an invitation to play in the 2008 Hawaii Bowl, where they achieved a decisive 49–21 victory over the Hawaii Rainbow Warriors. During the game, Brown contributed with six individual tackles, one pass deflection, and a blocked punt. Over thirteen games, Brown logged 21 solo and seven assisted tackles for a total of 28 tackles, averaging over two tackles per game. He led FBS Independent schools in pass deflections, with six total for the 2008 season.

In his last season at Notre Dame, Brown had a standout season, starting in all twelve games as a member of the team's leadership committee. In a November 7 game against the Navy Midshipmen, Brown achieved a career-high of 9 total tackles. He ended his senior season with a total of 49 combined tackles, two pass deflections, and two forced fumbles, leading the FBS Independent conference in forced fumbles and achieving a 10th-place ranking in solo tackles with a total of 37.

== Professional career ==
Pre-draft measurables
Height	Weight	Arm length	Hand span	40-yard dash	10-yard split	20-yard split	20-yard shuttle	Three-cone drill	Vertical jump	Broad jump	Bench press
6 ft 0 5/8 in (1.84 m)	210 lb (95 kg)	31 1/2 in (0.80 m)	10 1/4 in (0.26 m)	4.49 s	1.56 s	2.56 s	4.10 s	6.58 s	35.0 in (0.89 m)	10 ft 3 in (3.12 m)	15 reps
All values from Pro Day

=== New England Patriots ===
==== 2010 season ====
Brown signed with the New England Patriots on April 25, 2010, as an undrafted free agent. He was waived during final cuts on September 4, 2010, but was re-signed to the team's practice squad two days later. Following an injury to Jarrad Page and the release of running back Thomas Clayton, Brown was promoted to the 53-man roster and signed a 4-year, $1.82 million contract with the Patriots on October 23. He made his NFL debut the next day against the San Diego Chargers, recording four tackles, including a late game third-down tackle on Chargers tight end Antonio Gates. By the end of the 2010 regular season, Brown had 11 tackles and one fumble recovery in 11 career games played as a reserve. He made his NFL playoff debut on January 16, 2011, in a 21–28 loss against the New York Jets in the AFC Divisional round, recording one tackle in the contest. Collectively, the Patriots finished with the first seed in the American Football Conference (AFC), with a league-best regular season record of 14–2.

==== 2011 season ====
Prior to the start of the 2011 NFL season, the Patriots released safeties Brandon Meriweather and James Sanders, promoting Brown to second-string safety behind Patrick Chung. In a game against the San Diego Chargers on September 18, Brown started a game for the first time, recording a combined seven tackles and his only career interception in the contest. Over the 15 regular season games that he appeared in, Brown started three games, making 37 total tackles. He played in all three playoff games for the Patriots, including a 17–21 loss against the New York Giants in Super Bowl XLVI. For the second season in a row, the Patriots finished as the first seed in the AFC, with a record of 13–3. On August 31, 2012, Brown was waived by the Patriots before the beginning of the 2012 NFL season.

=== Indianapolis Colts ===
==== 2012 season ====
The Colts claimed Brown off waivers on September 2, 2012, where he would play as a gunner and backup safety to fellow Notre Dame alum Tom Zbikowski. In his first regular season with the Colts, Brown played in all 16 games, recording 11 total tackles and a pass deflection; however, he did not start in any contests. During a November 19 match against his former team, the Patriots, Brown delivered a hit on former teammate Rob Gronkowski while blocking for an extra point play, breaking Gronkowski's arm. He made a single tackle in a 9–24 loss against the Baltimore Ravens in the AFC Wild Card game. The Colts ended the season with an 11–5 record, second in the AFC South division.

==== 2013 season ====
In the 2013 preseason, Brown incurred a hamstring injury during practice; he was later cleared to play in the Colts' season opener against the Oakland Raiders on September 8. During the regular season, Brown played in 14 games, logging seven tackles and two fumble recoveries. In the postseason, he made one tackle in the Colts' 45–44 victory over the Kansas City Chiefs in the AFC Wild Card game. The Colts matched their previous season's performance, finishing with an 11–5 record and ranking first in the AFC South.

==== 2014 season ====
In the 2014 season, Brown played in 15 regular season games, starting eight, with 33 total tackles including 24 solo tackles and nine assists. He recorded one tackle for loss, two quarterback hits, and recovered one fumble for 26 yards in a November 3 game against the New York Giants. Following a touchdown by running back Jonas Gray during a November 16 game against the Patriots, Rob Gronkowski forcefully blocked Brown out of bounds, resulting in Gronkowski receiving an unsportsmanlike conduct penalty and a $8,268 fine. Brown participated in all three playoff games, adding one solo tackle in a 7–45 loss against the Patriots in the AFC Championship Game. For the third consecutive year, the Colts ended the regular season with an 11–5 record and topped the AFC South standings for the second straight year. Following the end of the season, Brown was not resigned and became an unrestricted free agent.

=== Jacksonville Jaguars ===
==== 2015 season ====
On March 10, 2015, Brown signed a three-year, $7 million contract with the Jacksonville Jaguars. In his only season with the team, he played 15 games and started in four. He accumulated 31 solo tackles, seven assist tackles, and two tackles for loss. Brown also recorded two defended passes and two quarterback hits. In a December 6 game against the Tennessee Titans, Brown achieved a season-high five combined tackles and an interception. The Jaguars finished third in the AFC South, with a season record of 5–11. On April 18, 2016, the Jaguars released Brown.

=== Atlanta Falcons ===
On August 20, 2016, Brown was signed by the Atlanta Falcons. He was released during final roster cuts on August 27, 2016.

=== Buffalo Bills ===
On November 2, 2016, Brown was signed by the Buffalo Bills. He played in eight games with no starts, recording five combined tackles for the season.

== Post-NFL career and personal life ==
Brown last played professional football in the 2016 NFL season. In 2017, Brown began a position as a digital advertising account manager at Google. He holds a master's degree in business administration from the University of Miami.

== Legal issues ==
On September 16, 2023, police in Maywood, Illinois launched a search after family members expressed concern at not being able to reach Brown or his mother, Myrtle Simmons-Brown. Officers discovered the body of Simmons-Brown near a creek behind her home; the Cook County Medical Examiner ruled the death as a homicide caused by blunt force trauma. Brown was not found at the scene of the crime, and was later declared a missing person.

Three days later, Brown appeared in an Instagram video tagged in Mexico, in which he claimed that he believed his mother was "on vacation in Sinaloa" and alleged that he had been kidnapped by the FBI. Other videos posted to the same Instagram account showed Brown repeatedly dismissing reports of his mother's death as fake news and ridiculing claims of his disappearance by referencing the film Finding Nemo. On October 1, Brown was seen partying at a club in Tulum.

On October 7, Brown was detained by Mexican authorities in Mexico City, where he was found in possession of several of his mother's belongings, including her credit cards and cell phone. He was later deported to San Diego following an altercation with Mexican police on a flight to Tijuana. On October 24, Brown was extradited to Illinois and formally charged with first-degree murder and concealing a dead body. Brown pleaded not guilty on December 6, 2023; he is currently in custody at Cook County Jail awaiting trial.
