= Brian Smith (linebacker, born 1989) =

American football player (born 1989)

No. 53
- Position: Linebacker

Personal information
- Born: January 8, 1989 (age 37); Overland Park, Kansas, U.S.
- Listed height: 6 ft 3 in (1.91 m)
- Listed weight: 240 lb (109 kg)

Career information
- High school: St. Thomas Aquinas (Overland Park)
- College: Notre Dame (2007–2010)
- NFL draft: 2011: undrafted

Career history
- Cleveland Browns (2011); Tampa Bay Buccaneers (2012)*; Buffalo Bills (2012)*
- * Offseason or practice squad member only
- Stats at Pro Football Reference

Brian C. Smith (born January 8, 1989) is an American former professional football linebacker who played in the National Football League (NFL) for the Cleveland Browns. He played college football at the University of Notre Dame. He was also member of the Tampa Bay Buccaneers and Buffalo Bills.

== Early life ==
Brian C. Smith was born on January 8, 1989, in Overland Park, Kansas. He played high school football at St. Thomas Aquinas High School in Overland Park. He totaled 100 tackles, one interception, three forced fumbles, and two fumble recoveries as a junior. He recorded 126 tackles and nine sacks during his senior season, earning all-metro honors from the Kansas City Star. In the class of 2007, he was rated the No. 13 inside linebacker in the nation and the No. 2 prospect in Kansas by Rivals.com.

== College career ==
Smith played for the Notre Dame Fighting Irish of the University of Notre Dame from 2007 to 2010. He played in 11 games, starting three, during his freshman year in 2007, accumulating 11 solo tackles, 14 assisted tackles, 1.5 sacks, one forced fumble, and one interception that he returned 25 yards for a touchdown. He appeared in 11 games, starting nine, in 2008, totaling 33 solo tackles, 21 assisted tackles, two sacks, two pass breakups, one forced fumble, and one fumble recovery that he returned 35 yards for a touchdown. Smith started all 12 games for the Fighting Irish during the 2009 season, recording 37 solo tackles, 34 assisted tackles, 1.5 sacks, and two interceptions. He posted 22 solo tackles, 28 assisted tackles, one sack, one interception, and one forced fumble as a senior in 2010. He majored in anthropology at Notre Dame.

== Professional career ==
Smith was signed by the Cleveland Browns on July 30, 2011. He was waived by the Browns on September 3 and later signed to the team's practice squad on November 29. He was promoted to the active roster on December 20 and played in two games for the Browns during the 2011 season without recording any statistics. Smith was waived by the Browns on May 8, 2012.

Smith signed with the Tampa Bay Buccaneers on August 2, 2012. He was waived by the Buccaneers on August 27, 2012.

Smith was signed to the practice squad of the Buffalo Bills on December 18, 2012. He signed a reserve/future contract with the Bills on December 31, 2012. He was waived on August 31, 2013.
