= Jamoris Slaughter =

American football player (born 1989)

No. 30
- Position: Safety

Personal information
- Born: December 22, 1989 (age 36); Stone Mountain, Georgia, U.S.
- Listed height: 6 ft 0 in (1.83 m)
- Listed weight: 195 lb (88 kg)

Career information
- High school: Tucker (Tucker, Georgia)
- College: Notre Dame
- NFL draft: 2013: 6th round, 175th overall pick

Career history
- Cleveland Browns (2013–2014)*
- * Offseason or practice squad member only
- Stats at Pro Football Reference

Jamoris Slaughter (born December 22, 1989) is an American former football safety. He was selected by the Cleveland Browns in the sixth round of the 2013 NFL draft. He played college football at Notre Dame.

== Early life ==
Slaughter attended Tucker High School in Tucker, Georgia where he helped lead the Tigers to the Class AAAA state semifinals before losing to the eventual state champions. His team finished the season with a 13-1 record and ranked No. 2 in the state. He won region six as a senior with a 10-0 record and was member of a defense that allowed only six points per game (best in Class AAAA) and pitched seven shutouts, and was credited with 56 tackles, three interceptions and 11 pass break ups during senior season. He totaled 66 tackles, four interceptions and three forced fumbles as a junior. He also ran track and had personal bests of 10.9 in the 100-meter dash and 49.0 in the 400 meters.

Considered a four-star recruit by Rivals.com, he was rated as the 13th best safety in the nation. He committed to Notre Dame over offers from Clemson, Georgia and Oklahoma.

== Professional career ==
Slaughter was selected by the Cleveland Browns in the sixth round (175th pick overall) of the 2013 NFL draft. He signed a four-year contract with the Browns on May 21, 2013. After being released, he was assigned to the practice squad on September 1, 2013. He was waived on June 9, 2014.
