= Trevor Robinson (American football) =

American football player (born 1990)

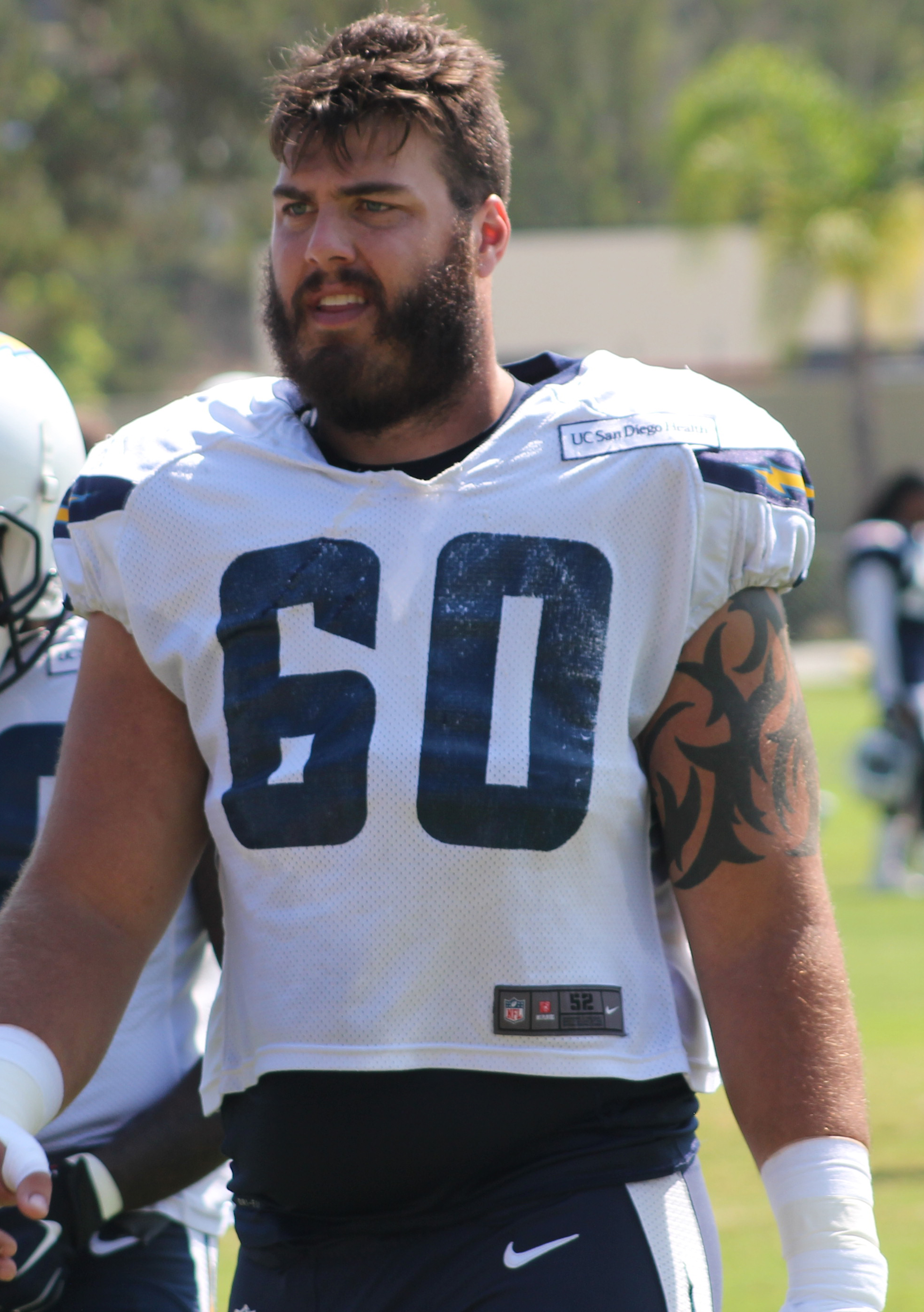
- Robinson with the San Diego Chargers in 2015

No. 66, 60
- Position: Center

Personal information
- Born: May 16, 1990 (age 36); Kearney, Nebraska, U.S.
- Listed height: 6 ft 5 in (1.96 m)
- Listed weight: 305 lb (138 kg)

Career information
- High school: Elkhorn (Elkhorn, Nebraska)
- College: Notre Dame
- NFL draft: 2012: undrafted

Career history
- Cincinnati Bengals (2012–2014); San Diego Chargers (2014–2015); Atlanta Falcons (2016)

Career NFL statistics
- Games played: 38
- Games started: 21
- Stats at Pro Football Reference

Trevor Robinson (born May 16, 1990) is an American former professional football player who was a center in the National Football League (NFL). He played college football for the Notre Dame Fighting Irish. He was signed by the Cincinnati Bengals as an undrafted free agent in 2012, and was also a member of the San Diego Chargers and Atlanta Falcons.

== Early life ==
He attended Elkhorn High School in Elkhorn, Nebraska. He was selected to play in the U.S. Army All-American Bowl in San Antonio, Texas. He was selected to the 2007 first-team All-American by USA Today.

== College career ==
He played college football at the University of Notre Dame. In his freshman year, he played 11 games for the Fighting Irish, starting in three. In his sophomore year, he played in 11 games in which he started all 11 of them. In his junior year, he played in 13 games in which started all 13 of them.

== Professional career ==
=== Cincinnati Bengals ===
On May 2, 2012, he signed with the Cincinnati Bengals as an undrafted free agent.

=== San Diego Chargers ===
On October 6, 2014, the San Diego Chargers claimed him off the Cincinnati Bengals practice squad. The Chargers waived him on July 29, 2016.

=== Atlanta Falcons ===
On November 29, 2016, Robinson was signed by the Atlanta Falcons. He was released on December 6, 2016. He signed a futures contract with the Falcons on January 18, 2017.

On July 17, 2017, Robinson retired from the NFL and the Falcons placed him on the team's reserve/retired list. He was released from the list on July 26, 2020.
