= Maurice Crum Jr. =

American football player and coach (born 1986)

Current position
- Title: Co-defensive coordinator and linebackers coach
- Team: SMU
- Conference: ACC

Biographical details
- Born: May 29, 1986 (age 40); Riverview, Florida, U.S.

Playing career
- 2005–2008: Notre Dame
- 2009–2011: Sacramento Mountain Lions
- Position: Linebacker

Coaching career (HC unless noted)
- 2012: Kansas (graduate assistant)
- 2013: Kansas (assistant director of operations)
- 2014: Kansas (director of high school relations)
- 2015: Notre Dame (graduate assistant)
- 2016: Indiana State (DB)
- 2017–2019: Western Kentucky (LB)
- 2020–2021: Western Kentucky (co-DC/LB)
- 2022: Ole Miss (co-DC/LB)
- 2023: SMU (LB/RGC)
- 2024–present: SMU (co-DC/LB)

Maurice Crum Jr. (born May 29, 1986) is an American football coach and former player who is currently the co-defensive coordinator and linebackers coach for the SMU Mustangs. He played college football at Notre Dame as a linebacker.

== Playing career ==
Crum played college football at Notre Dame as a linebacker. Following his college career, Crum played for the Sacramento Mountain Lions of the United Football League and was signed as an undrafted free agent in 2009.

== Coaching career ==
Following his playing career, Crum began his coaching career at Kansas under head coach Charlie Weis from 2012 to 2014. Crum would return to his alma mater for one season in 2015, serving as a defensive graduate assistant at Notre Dame under head coach Brian Kelly. He would move on to Indiana State for one season, serving as the Sycamores' defensive back coach.

Crum was hired as the linebackers coach at Western Kentucky prior to the 2017 season; he would be promoted to co-defensive coordinator before the 2020 season. Crum would be promoted to head defensive coordinator in 2021 after incumbent DC Clayton White was hired for the same position at South Carolina. In 2022, Crum was hired as a co-defensive coordinator at Ole Miss and also served as the Rebels' linebackers coach. He would be hired as the linebackers coach and defensive run game coordinator at SMU for the 2023 season and was promoted to co-defensive coordinator for the 2024 season.

== Personal life ==
He is married to Crysta Swayzer Crum, and has three sons, Maurice III, Allen and Noah.
