= David Bruton (American football) =

American football player (born 1987)

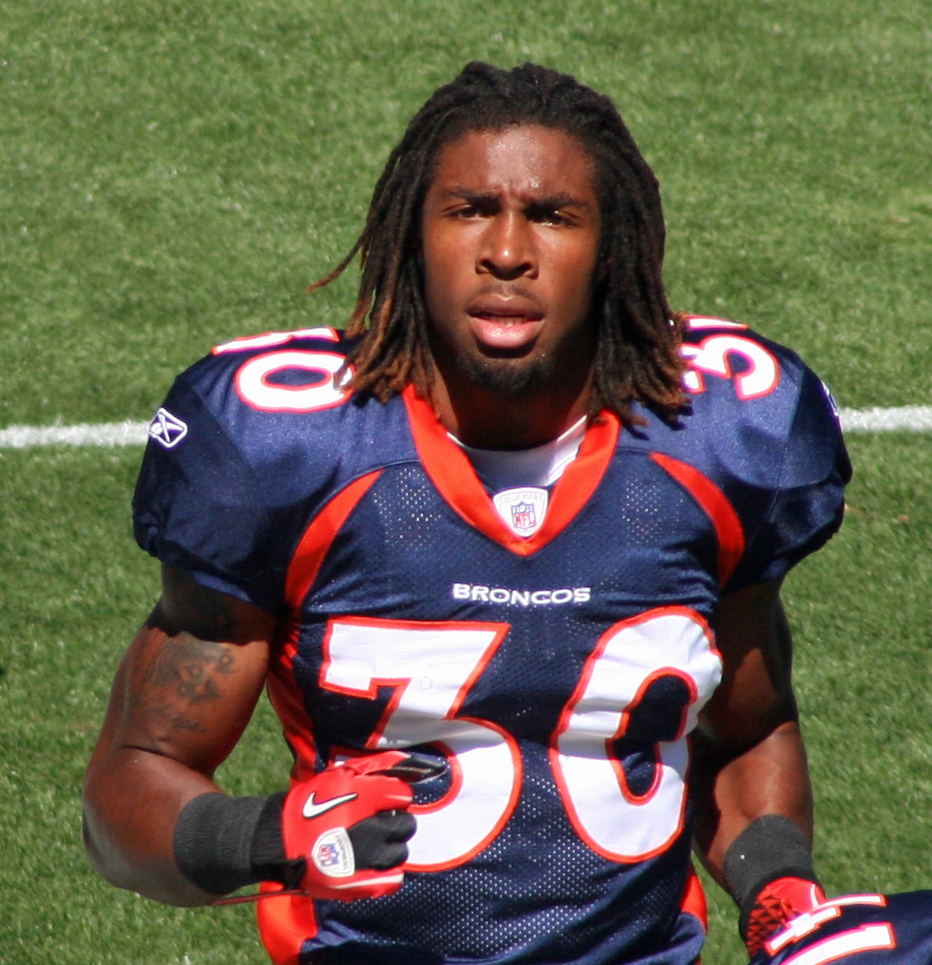
- Bruton with the Denver Broncos in 2010

No. 30
- Position: Safety

Personal information
- Born: July 23, 1987 (age 39); Winchester, Kentucky, U.S.
- Listed height: 6 ft 2 in (1.88 m)
- Listed weight: 225 lb (102 kg)

Career information
- High school: Miamisburg (Miamisburg, Ohio)
- College: Notre Dame
- NFL draft: 2009: 4th round, 114th overall pick

Career history
- Denver Broncos (2009–2015); Washington Redskins (2016)

Awards and highlights
- Super Bowl champion (50)

Career NFL statistics
- Total tackles: 190
- Sacks: 2.0
- Pass deflections: 18
- Interceptions: 3
- Forced fumbles: 5
- Stats at Pro Football Reference

David Lee Bruton Jr. (born July 23, 1987) is an American former professional football player who was a safety and special teamer in the National Football League (NFL). He was selected by the Denver Broncos in the fourth round of the 2009 NFL draft. He played college football for the Notre Dame Fighting Irish. He was also a member of the Washington Redskins.

== Early life ==
Bruton attended Miamisburg High School in Miamisburg, Ohio. As a senior, he recorded 54 tackles, three interceptions and broke up seven passes on defense, while catching 10 passes for 200 yards on offense. He earned All-Division I-II all-area honors from Dayton Daily News and won all-district honors on defense.

== College career ==
Bruton played four seasons at the University of Notre Dame, playing as a starter in his junior and senior seasons. Bruton finished his career with 214 total tackles and seven interceptions. His best season came as a senior, when he finished second on the team with 97 total tackles and had a team-high four interceptions. In Bruton's final college game, he had an interception in the Hawaii Bowl, helping Notre Dame win its first bowl game since the 1993 season. Bruton graduated from Notre Dame in 2009 with a bachelor's degree, majoring in political science and sociology.

== Professional career ==
Pre-draft measurables
| Height | Weight | Arm length | Hand span | 40-yard dash | 10-yard split | 20-yard split | 20-yard shuttle | Three-cone drill | Vertical jump | Broad jump | Bench press |
|---|---|---|---|---|---|---|---|---|---|---|---|
| 6 ft 2 in (1.88 m) | 219 lb (99 kg) | 34 1/4 in (0.87 m) | 10 in (0.25 m) | 4.46 s | 1.61 s | 2.64 s | 4.28 s | 6.60 s | 41.5 in (1.05 m) | 11 ft 0 in (3.35 m) | 19 reps |
All values from NFL Combine

=== Denver Broncos ===
Bruton was selected in the fourth round (114th overall) of the 2009 NFL draft by the Denver Broncos. Before the 2009 season, Bruton signed a four-year contract with Denver. Bruton made his first career start on December 20, 2009, against the Oakland Raiders where he recorded four tackles. Bruton finished his rookie 2009 season with 14 total tackles. During the lockout, he had taken a job as a substitute teacher in Miamisburg, Ohio.

Bruton provides the Broncos with depth at the safety position, yet he is mostly used on special teams and is considered one of the best special teamers in the league. Bruton had been the Broncos' special teams captain for the 2013–2015 seasons.

On March 11, 2013, Bruton re-signed with the Broncos on a three-year contract.

On September 27, 2015, Bruton recorded a key fourth quarter interception off of Detroit Lions quarterback Matthew Stafford in a 24–12 victory over Detroit. On December 20, in a game against the Pittsburgh Steelers, Bruton suffered a broken fibula early into the game. However, he refused to be taken out of the game and instead played through the rest of it. He was on the field for 77 plays with the broken leg before being taken off late in the fourth quarter. The Broncos went on to lose the game 34–27. Two days later, the Broncos placed him on injured reserve.

On February 7, 2016, Bruton was part of the Broncos team that won Super Bowl 50. In the game, the Broncos defeated the Carolina Panthers by a score of 24–10. However, he did not play in the game due to injury.

=== Washington Redskins ===
Bruton signed with the Washington Redskins on a three–year, $9 million contract on March 15, 2016. He was placed on injured reserve on October 5, 2016. He was released by the Redskins on December 2, 2016.

=== Retirement ===
On July 24, 2017, Bruton announced his retirement from the NFL due to health concerns after suffering six concussions in eight seasons in the league.

=== Career statistics ===
| Year | Team | Games | | Tackles | | | | Fumbles | | | Interceptions | | | | | |
| Year | Team | GP | GS | Comb | Total | Ast | Sack | FF | FR | Yds | INT | Yds | Avg | Lng | TD | PD |
|---|---|---|---|---|---|---|---|---|---|---|---|---|---|---|---|---|
| 2009 | DEN | 14 | 1 | 14 | 12 | 2 | 0.0 | 1 | 0 | 0 | 0 | 0 | 0.0 | 0 | 0 | 1 |
| 2010 | DEN | 16 | 2 | 25 | 21 | 4 | 0.0 | 0 | 0 | 0 | 0 | 0 | 0.0 | 0 | 0 | 1 |
| 2011 | DEN | 15 | 1 | 21 | 19 | 2 | 0.0 | 0 | 0 | 0 | 0 | 0 | 0.0 | 0 | 0 | 3 |
| 2012 | DEN | 16 | 0 | 5 | 5 | 0 | 0.0 | 0 | 0 | 0 | 1 | -2 | -2.0 | -2 | 0 | 1 |
| 2013 | DEN | 16 | 0 | 23 | 18 | 5 | 0.0 | 0 | 0 | 0 | 0 | 0 | 0.0 | 0 | 0 | 0 |
| 2014 | DEN | 14 | 1 | 25 | 19 | 6 | 0.0 | 2 | 0 | 0 | 0 | 0 | 0.0 | 0 | 0 | 3 |
| 2015 | DEN | 13 | 3 | 49 | 37 | 12 | 1.0 | 2 | 1 | 0 | 2 | 11 | 5.5 | 12 | 0 | 7 |
| 2016 | WSH | 4 | 4 | 28 | 20 | 8 | 1.0 | 0 | 0 | 0 | 0 | 0 | 0.0 | 0 | 0 | 2 |
| Career | | 108 | 12 | 190 | 151 | 39 | 2.0 | 5 | 1 | 0 | 3 | 9 | 3.0 | 12 | 0 | 18 |

== Personal life ==
During the 2011 NFL offseason, Bruton served as an elementary and high school substitute teacher in his former school district in Miamisburg, Ohio. He obtained a one-year license to substitute teach from the Ohio Department of Education.

Bruton was selected as the Broncos' 2015 Walter Payton NFL Man of the Year. He was recognized for his community and charity efforts including work with his charity, "Bruton's Books".

In 2021 he received a doctor of physical therapy (DPT) degree from the University of Colorado Physical Therapy Program.
