= 2007 Notre Dame Fighting Irish football team =

American college football season

2007 Notre Dame Fighting Irish football
- Conference: Independent
- Record: 3–9
- Head coach: Charlie Weis (3rd season)
- Offensive coordinator: Michael Haywood (3rd season)
- Offensive scheme: Pro-style
- Defensive coordinator: Corwin Brown (1st season)
- Base defense: 3–4
- MVP: Trevor Laws
- Captains: John Carlson; Maurice Crum Jr; Travis Thomas; Tom Zbikowski
- Home stadium: Notre Dame Stadium

2007 NCAA Division I FBS independents football records
	Conf.			Overall
Team	W		L	W		L
Navy		–		8	–	5
Army		–		3	–	9
Notre Dame		–		3	–	9
Rankings from AP Poll

The 2007 Notre Dame Fighting Irish football team was an American football team that represented the University of Notre Dame as an independent during the 2007 NCAA Division I FBS football season. In their third year under head coach Charlie Weis, the Irish compiled a 3–9 record and were outscored by a total of 345 to 197. For the first time in school history, Notre Dame opened the season with five losses (Notre Dame's worst opening prior to 2007 was 0–3). Their nine losses was also a school record.

The team's statistical leaders included quarterback Jimmy Clausen (1,254 passing yards), running back James Aldridge (463 rushing yards), and tight end John Carlson (40 receptions for 372 yards) and kicker Brandon Walker (40 points scored, 22 of 23 PAT, 6 of 12 field goals).

The team played its home games at Notre Dame Stadium in South Bend, Indiana.

== Schedule ==
The 2007 Notre Dame schedule was ranked the 13th hardest in the country by Sports Illustrated. The road schedule was ranked as the 10th most difficult.

Date	Time	Opponent	Site	TV	Result	Attendance
September 1	3:30 p.m.	Georgia Tech	Notre Dame Stadium; Notre Dame, IN (rivalry)	NBC	L 3–33	80,795
September 8	6:00 p.m.	at No. 14 Penn State	Beaver Stadium; State College, PA (rivalry)	ESPN	L 10–31	110,078
September 15	3:30 p.m.	at Michigan	Michigan Stadium; Ann Arbor, MI (rivalry)	ABC	L 0–38	111,178
September 22	3:30 p.m.	Michigan State	Notre Dame Stadium; Notre Dame, IN (rivalry)	NBC	L 14–31	80,795
September 29	12:00 p.m.	at Purdue	Ross–Ade Stadium; West Lafayette, IN (rivalry)	ESPN	L 19–33	62,250
October 6	8:00 p.m.	at UCLA	Rose Bowl; Pasadena, CA	ABC	W 20–6	78,543
October 13	3:30 p.m.	No. 4 Boston College	Notre Dame Stadium; Notre Dame, IN (Holy War)	NBC	L 14–27	80,795
October 20	3:30 p.m.	No. 14 USC	Notre Dame Stadium; Notre Dame, IN (rivalry)	NBC	L 0–38	80,795
November 3	2:30 p.m.	Navy	Notre Dame Stadium; Notre Dame, IN (rivalry)	NBC	L 44–46 ^{3OT}	80,795
November 10	2:30 p.m.	Air Force	Notre Dame Stadium; Notre Dame, IN (rivalry)	NBC	L 24–41	80,795
November 17	2:30 p.m.	Duke	Notre Dame Stadium; Notre Dame, IN	NBC	W 28–7	80,795
November 24	3:30 p.m.	at Stanford	Stanford Stadium; Stanford, CA (rivalry)	ESPN	W 21–14	48,953
Rankings from AP Poll released prior to the game; All times are in Eastern time

== Preseason ==
=== Coaching changes ===
With the end of the 2006 season, two assistant coaches' contracts came up and were not renewed by the Irish. Rick Minter, the defensive coordinator who had been with the Irish since the 2005 season, was replaced by Corwin Brown, and Peter Vaas, the quarterback coach who had also been with the Irish since 2005 after David Cutcliffe left the position, was replaced by former Irish quarterback, Ron Powlus. Both Powlus and Brown played college football and had time playing in the NFL. Brown was previously an assistant coach for the New York Jets and Powlus had been Notre Dame's director of personnel development since 2005.

=== Roster changes ===
The Irish lost a number of players to graduation and the NFL. Former consensus All-American, and two-year starting wide receiver, Jeff Samardzija, was signed by Major League Baseball's Chicago Cubs as a pitcher, while twelve others were signed onto NFL teams. Former offensive starters Brady Quinn, Ryan Harris, and Dan Santucci and defensive starters Victor Abiamiri, Derek Landri, Mike Richardson, and Chinedum Ndukwe were taken in the 2007 NFL draft, while five others, Marcus Freeman, Chris Frome, Travis Leitko, Rhema McKnight, and Darius Walker, signed contracts with NFL teams. The team returns three starters on offense and five on defense. Despite the number of high-profile losses, Weis refused to call it a "rebuilding year," citing a number of fifth-year seniors that he owes to try to win.

=== Award candidates ===
Four players were named to six national awards watch lists in the pre-season:

- John Carlson – Maxwell Award
- Maurice Crum Jr. – Bronko Nagurski Trophy, Chuck Bednarik Award, and Lott Trophy
- John Sullivan – Dave Rimington Trophy and Outland Trophy
- Tom Zbikowski – Bronko Nagurski Trophy, Chuck Bednarik Award, and Lott Trophy

== Game summaries ==
=== Georgia Tech ===
	1	2	3	4	Total
Georgia Tech	6	10	3	14	33
Notre Dame	0	0	3	0	3

While deciding who would be the starting quarterback two weeks before the opener, Weis, wanting to keep the Yellow Jackets guessing, would only tell the media that the quarterback and his backup knew their roles. Demetrius Jones started the game, with Evan Sharpley and Jimmy Clausen both seeing action as quarterback. Giving up nine sacks and two fumbles, and having negative 8-yards rushing, the Irish lost 33–3 in their most lopsided season opening loss in the history of the program.

=== Penn State ===
	1	2	3	4	Total
Notre Dame	7	0	3	0	10
#15 Penn State	7	7	10	7	31

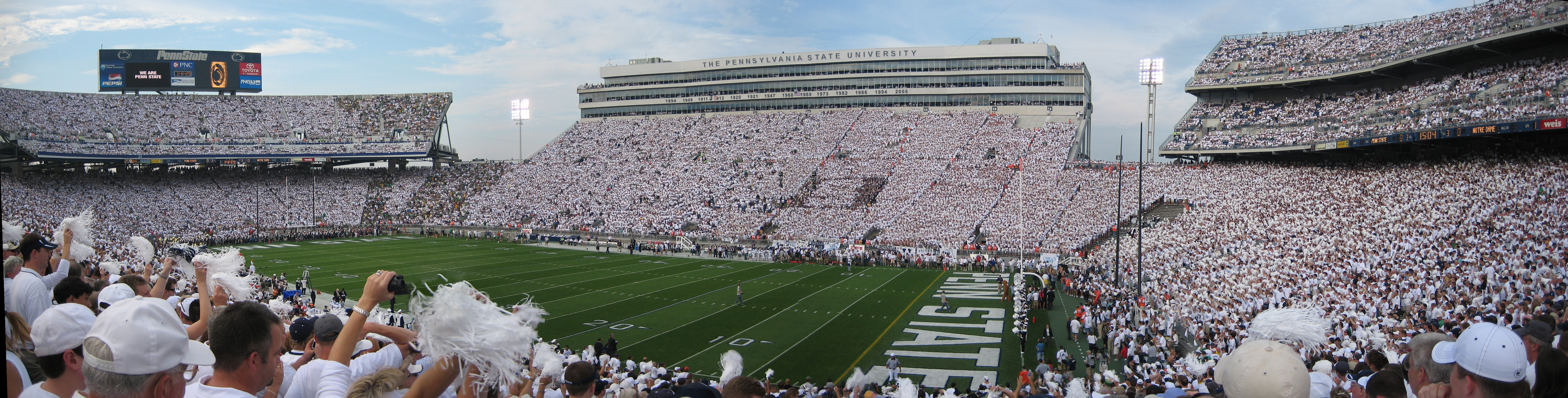
Notre Dame at Penn State during White Out

After the opening loss, Weis named freshman Jimmy Clausen the starting quarterback. Clausen would become the eighth Notre Dame freshman to start at quarterback since 1951 and would be the earliest to start when he faced the 15th ranked Penn State Nittany Lions in Happy Valley. The Nittany Lions won the game 31–10. The Irish ended the game with no rushing yards, and had only 144 total yards. They also amassed 97 yards in penalties.

=== Michigan ===
	1	2	3	4	Total
Notre Dame	0	0	0	0	0
Michigan	10	21	7	0	38

With both teams starting the season 0–2, for the first time ever a combined 0–4, the Irish next faced the Michigan Wolverines. Michigan played without their starting quarterback Chad Henne due to a leg injury. Michigan senior running back Mike Hart guaranteed a victory over the Irish.

Quarterback Demetrius Jones did not board a bus for the trip to Michigan. Charlie Weis issued a statement saying, "At 2:30 today, while boarding the bus to Michigan, I was notified that Demetrius Jones had decided not to make the trip. I have not spoken to Demetrius and can only say that he missed the team bus. Any additional comment would be without all the facts." On game day, it was reported that he had enrolled at Northern Illinois University, however, he later revealed that he was transferring to the University of Cincinnati.

Michigan won 38–0, tying their largest-ever win over Notre Dame set during the 2003 season. For only the second time in school history, Notre Dame opened the season with three losses.

=== Michigan State ===
	1	2	3	4	Total
Michigan State	14	3	14	0	31
Notre Dame	7	7	0	0	14

Despite scoring their first two offensive touchdowns of the season (the first resulting from a fumble by MSU's quarterback, Brian Hoyer, at the 9-yard line), Notre Dame fell to Michigan State 31–14. For the first time in 119 seasons of Notre Dame football, the Irish had started a season 0–4. Michigan State also became the first opponent to win six in a row at Notre Dame Stadium.

=== Purdue ===
	1	2	3	4	Total
Notre Dame	0	0	6	13	19
#25 Purdue	10	13	3	7	33

Despite outgaining the Boilermakers in total yards (426–371) and Clausen throwing his first collegiate touchdown, the Irish fell to 0–5 on the season to Purdue by a score of 33–19. Down 23–0 at halftime, the Irish came out in the second half and drove to a 37-yard touchdown drive with Clausen's pass to John Carlson. Clausen left the game afterwards with an undisclosed injury. Evan Sharpley replaced him and threw his first collegiate touchdown in the fourth quarter and later threw another to put the Irish down by a touchdown, but they wouldn't score again. The Irish had much trouble in their kicking game with only one extra point made on three attempts and a blocked field goal.

=== UCLA ===
	1	2	3	4	Total
Notre Dame	3	0	17	0	20
#25 UCLA	3	3	0	0	6

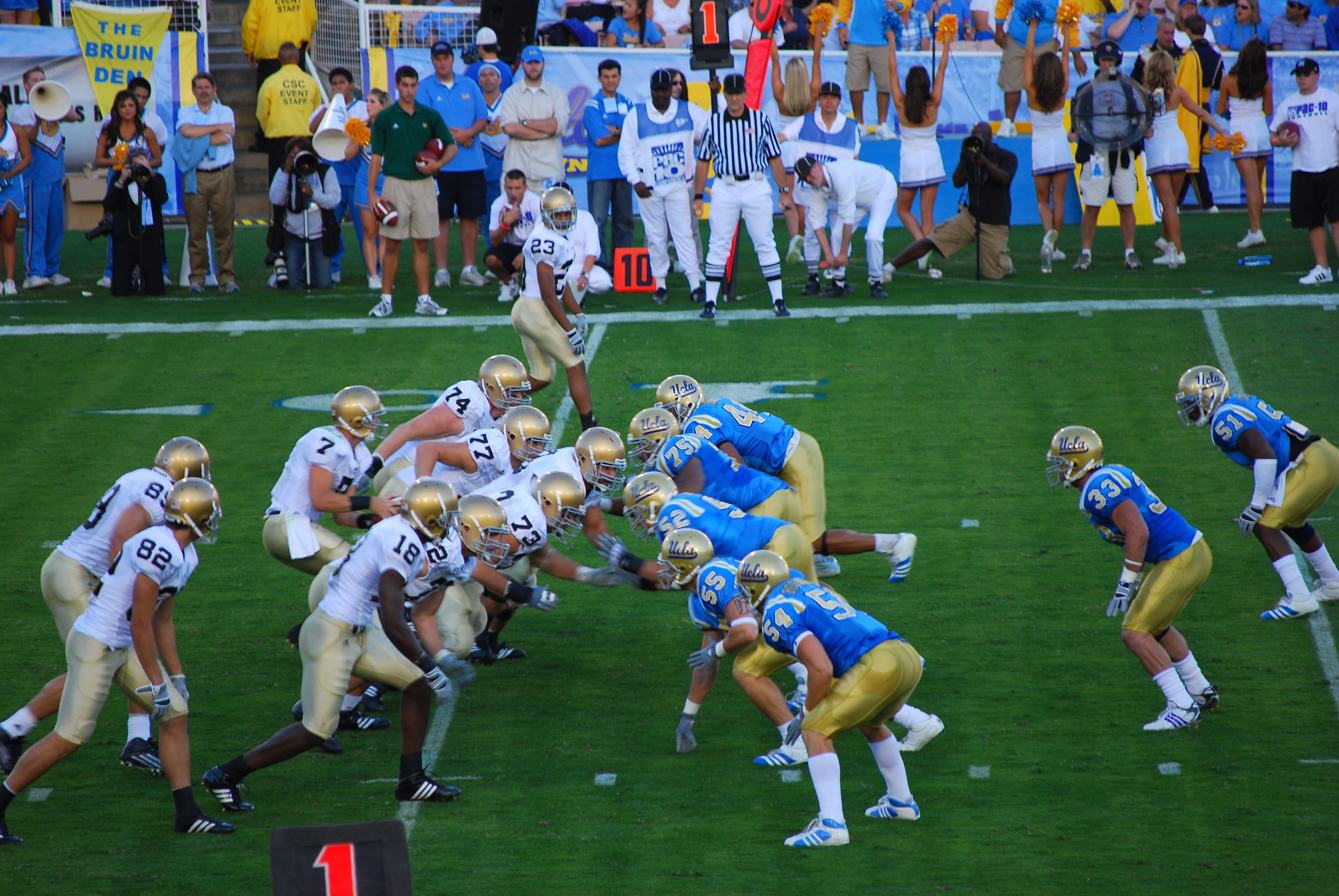
Jimmy Clausen directs the ND offense

UCLA was without its two starting quarterbacks. UCLA starter Ben Olson went out with a knee injury late in the first quarter, which left freshman walkon redshirt McLeod Bethel-Thompson to lead the Bruins. This was the first appearance for the Irish in the Rose Bowl stadium since the 1925 Rose Bowl. The Irish were able to capitalize on Bruin offensive mistakes to recover loose balls. This ended one of the worst slumps in Fighting Irish football, and prevented the Irish from equaling their longest losing streak in their history. The 1960 Notre Dame Fighting Irish football team lost eight straight games. The biggest cheer during the entire game came when the score of the 2007 Stanford vs. Southern California football game was announced. Fighting Irish and Bruins fans, who together are arch-rivals of the Trojans, cheered together.

=== Boston College ===
	1	2	3	4	Total
#4 Boston College	6	7	14	0	27
Notre Dame	0	0	14	0	14

In a battle between the two Catholic schools, the unbeaten Boston College Eagles and Heisman-hopeful Matt Ryan faced off against the struggling Notre Dame Fighting Irish. Faced with constant blitzes from the Irish defense, Ryan used a short passing attack to lead the Eagles to a 20–0 lead early in the third quarter. Just as the game appeared headed for another blowout, Evan Sharpley, replacing an ineffective Jimmy Clausen, threw a touchdown pass to wide receiver Robby Parris followed by a pick six of Ryan during the next possession. With the score suddenly 20–14, the Eagles took advantage of good starting field position to answer with their own touchdown for the game's final score of 27–14.

=== USC ===
	1	2	3	4	Total
#9 USC	7	10	14	7	38
Notre Dame	0	0	0	0	0

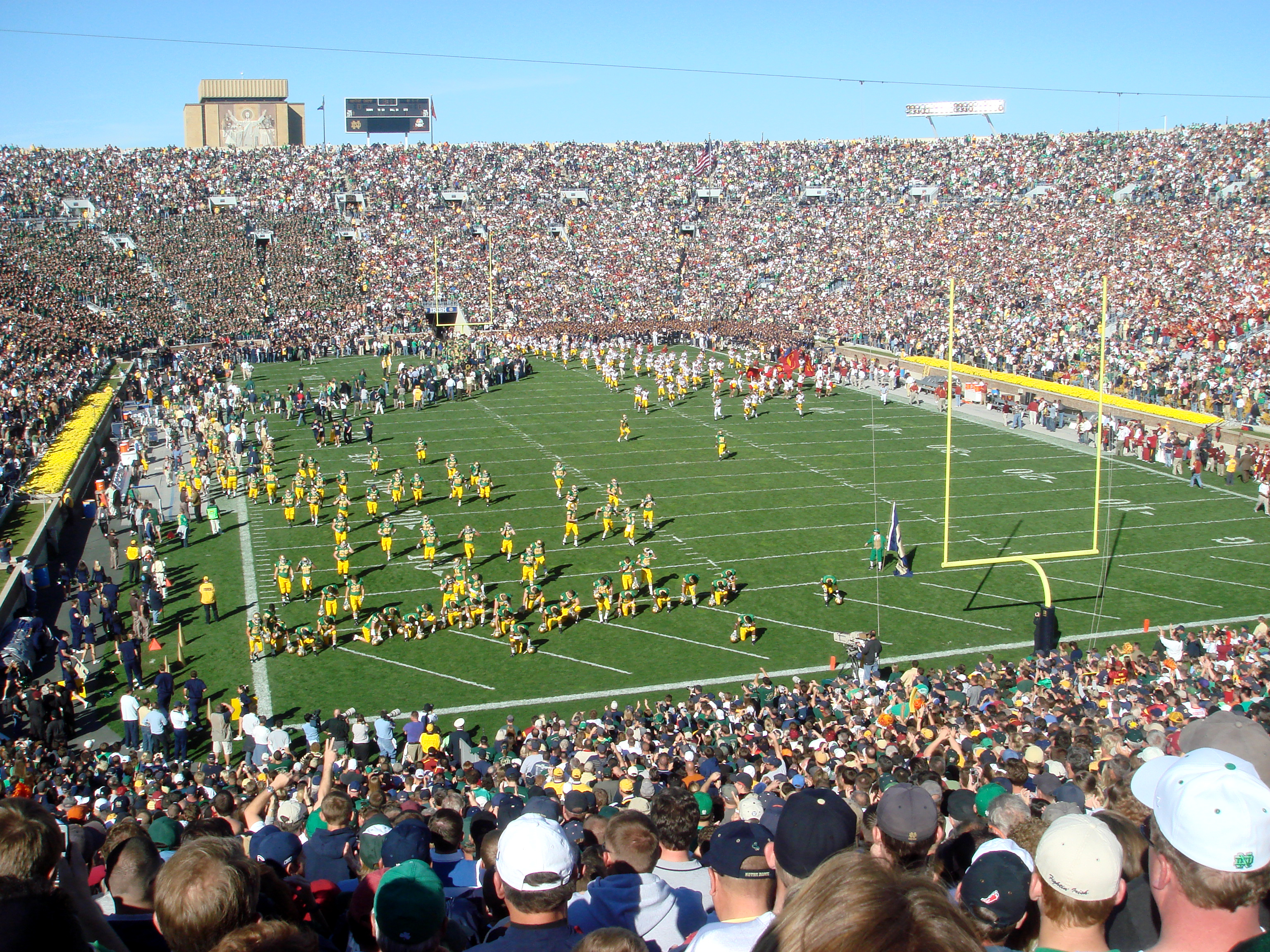
Notre Dame and USC take the field in the 79th edition of the rivalry.

In what was the largest margin victory the Trojans have put forth on the Irish to date, Notre Dame was shut out by USC for the first time since 1998. USC came into this game 5–1, while Notre Dame came in 1–6. Notre Dame head coach Charlie Weis announced during that summer that his team would wear throwback green jerseys for the matchup, signifying the 30-year anniversary of the Irish beating the Trojans in their green jerseys in 1977, when Weis was a senior at Notre Dame. Because of John David Booty's injured finger, USC back-up quarterback, Mark Sanchez, was the starter. In his second game as a starter, Sanchez managed to complete 21 of 38 passes with a combined total of 235 yards and 4 touchdown passes. This was the Trojans' 6th consecutive victory over the Irish, and in the process they became only the third team to accomplish this feat (Michigan and Michigan State share the record with eight straight wins in non consecutive years).

=== Navy ===
	1	2	3	4	OT	2OT	3OT	Total
Navy	0	14	6	8	7	3	8	46
Notre Dame	7	14	0	7	7	3	6	44

Notre Dame came into the game with 43 consecutive wins against Navy since the last loss in 1963. In triple overtime, Navy (5–4) scored a touchdown and successful two-point conversion on their possession. Notre Dame (1–8) likewise scored a touchdown, but failed to make their own two-point conversion on a rush attempt.

=== Air Force ===
	1	2	3	4	Total
Air Force	10	7	14	10	41
Notre Dame	0	10	0	14	24

ESPN reported, "A week after the Midshipmen eked out a triple overtime victory against the Fighting Irish for the first time since 1963, Air Force beat Notre Dame 41–24 for its worst loss to a service academy since that Navy victory 44 years ago...It was the largest margin of victory for Air Force in six wins over the Irish and the biggest by a military academy since Navy beat the Irish 35–14 in 1963 behind Roger Staubach."

With the loss to Air Force, the Fighting Irish have lost nine games in one season for the first time in school history.

=== Duke ===
	1	2	3	4	Total
Duke	0	0	0	7	7
Notre Dame	0	14	7	7	28

Notre Dame garnered its second win of the season in a game between what ESPN's Lee Corso called the two worst teams in major college football. Notre Dame was led with three Jimmy Clausen touchdown passes of 25, 25 and 9 yards each. Freshman running back Robert Hughes also added a touchdown in the 3rd quarter. The win would be the Irish's only home win of the season, avoiding what would have been its first winless season at home in 74 years. The Irish gained 220 yards rushing behind the hard running of freshman tailbacks Robert Hughes and Armando Allen. After a scoreless first quarter, Notre Dame managed to capitalize on two forced fumbles in the final 1:12 of the 2nd quarter to take a 14–0 half time lead. Clausen was 16-for-32 for 194 yards and had his second straight three-touchdown game.

=== Stanford ===
	1	2	3	4	Total
Notre Dame	7	7	0	7	21
Stanford	7	7	0	0	14

The Irish concluded their season on a high note, winning its second straight game and its second win on the road. Robert Hughes ran for 136 yards and the go-ahead 6-yard touchdown with 6:06 remaining in the 4th quarter to help the Irish beat Stanford 21–14. Jimmy Clausen went 19–32 for 196 yards and one touchdown. The game was one of missed field goals, turnovers and controversial calls against the Irish. The Cardinal missed 4 field goals and turned the ball over twice. Notre Dame, meanwhile, committed 4 turnovers, including 3 fumbles and an interception. Notre Dame would have added a score in the 3rd quarter, but a touchdown pass from Clausen to David Grimes was overturned on inconclusive evidence, despite the ruling on the field of a touchdown.

Notre Dame almost added another score on what would have been a spectacular finish to the half. David Bruton intercepted Stanford quarterback Tavita Pritchard's last-play heave at the 3-yard line and began a three-lateral return to the end zone that was called back on a personal foul on Notre Dame defensive lineman Trevor Laws. Safety Tom Zbikowski ran the final 30 yards after a lateral from Darrin Walls.

== Personnel ==
2007 Notre Dame Fighting Irish football team roster
Players
Coaches
Offense

Pos.	#	Name	Class
WR	1	D.J. Hord	Jr
QB	3	Demetrius Jones	So
RB	5	Armando Allen Jr.	Fr
QB	7	Jimmy Clausen	Fr
WR	11	David Grimes	Jr
QB	12	Darrin Bragg	Sr
QB	13	Evan Sharpley	Jr
QB	16	Justin Gillett	Sr
WR	18	Duval Kamara	Fr
WR	19	George West Jr.	So
WR	21	Barry Gallup Jr.	So
WR	23	Golden Tate	Fr
WR	24	Brandon Erickson	Sr
RB	26	Travis Thomas	Sr
WR	29	Jake Richardville	Sr
FB	32	Luke Schmidt	So
RB	33	Robert Hughes	Fr
RB	34	James Aldridge	So
FB	36	Dex Cure	So
RB	37	Junior Jabbie	Sr
WR	38	Nick Possley	Sr
TE	39	Kevin Brooks	Jr
RB	41	Nikolas Rodriguez	Jr
FB	44	Asaph Schwapp	Jr
WR	45	Kris Patterson	Jr
FB	47	Mike Narvaez	So
G	51	Dan Wenger	So
G	55	Eric Olsen	So
G	59	Chris Stewart	So
OT	63	Jeff Tisak	Jr
C	67	Thomas Bemenderfer	Jr
OT	70	Matt Romine	Fr
OT	71	Bartley Webb	So
OT	72	Paul Duncan	Jr
G	73	Matt Carufel	So
OT	74	Sam Young	So
OT	75	Taylor Dever	Fr
G	77	Michael Turkovich	Jr
C	78	John Sullivan	Sr
WR	80	Richard Jackson	So
WR	82	Robby Parris	So
TE	83	Mike Ragone	Fr
TE	84	Will Yeatman	So
WR	85	Sam Vos	So
TE	86	Mike Talerico	Sr
TE	88	Konrad Reuland	So
TE	89	John Carlson	Sr

Defense

Pos.	#	Name	Class
CB	2	Darrin Walls	So
CB	4	Gary Gray	Fr
S	6	Ray Herring	Jr
CB	8	Raeshon McNeil	So
S	9	Tom Zbikowski	Sr
CB	15	Leo Ferrine	Sr
CB	20	Terrail Lambert	Sr
CB	22	Ambrose Wooden	Sr
CB	23	William David Williams	Sr
S	24	Leonard Gordon	So
CB	25	Munir Prince	So
S	27	David Bruton	Jr
S	28	Kyle McCarthy	Jr
S	29	Jashaad Gaines	So
S	30	Harrison Smith	Fr
S	31	Sergio Brown	So
MLB	35	Kevin Smith	Jr
MLB	36	Alex Lough	So
CB	38	Wade Iams	Sr
MLB	40	Maurice Crum Jr.	Sr
OLB	41	Scott Smith	Jr
OLB	42	Kevin Washington	Jr
CB	43	Mike Anello	Jr
DB	45	John Leonis	Jr
MLB	47	Aaron Nagel	Fr
MLB	48	Steve Quinn	Jr
MLB	49	Toryan Smith	So
MLB	50	Steve Paskorz	Fr
MLB	52	Joe Brockington	Sr
OLB	53	Morrice Richardson	So
OLB	54	Anthony Vernaglia	Sr
OLB	56	Kerry Neal	Fr
DE	57	Dwight Stephenson Jr.	Sr
OLB	58	Brian Smith	Fr
NT	69	Neil Kennedy	Sr
DE	76	Andrew Nuss	Fr
OLB	90	John Ryan	So
DE	91	Emeka Nwankwo	Fr
DE	92	Derrell Hand	Jr
DE	93	Paddy Mullen	So
DL	94	Justin Brown	Sr
NT	95	Ian Williams	Fr
NT	96	Pat Kuntz	Jr
DE	97	Kallen Wade	So
DE	98	Trevor Laws	Sr

Special teams

Pos.	#	Name	Class
K	14	Brandon Walker	Fr
P	17	Geoff Price	Sr
K	35	Nate Whitaker	So
K	39	Ryan Burkhart	So
P	43	Eric Maust	So
LS	61	J.J. Jansen	Sr
P	91	Xavier Burton	So

Head coach

- Charlie Weis

Coordinators/assistant coaches

- Corwin Brown – Defensive Coordinator
- Michael Haywood – Off. Coordinator/Running Backs Coach
- Rob Ianello – Receivers Coach/Recruiting Coordinator
- John Latina – Assistant Head Coach (Offense)/Off. Line
- Bill Lewis – Asst. Head Coach (Defense)/Def. Backs
- Jappy Oliver – Defensive Line Coach
- Bernie Parmalee – Tight Ends/Special Teams Coach
- Brian Polian – Inside Linebackers/Special Teams Coach
- Ron Powlus – Quarterbacks Coach
- Patrick Graham – Defensive Graduate Assistant
- Shane Waldron – Offensive Graduate Assistant

Legend

- (C) Team captain
- (S) Suspended
- (I) Ineligible
- Injured
- Redshirt

Roster

=== Recruiting ===
The Irish added 18 players to its roster with high school recruits. Included in the class were five-star quarterback recruit Jimmy Clausen, nine four star recruits on offense, and four on defense. The class was named a top-15 class by most media.

College recruiting (2007)
Name	Hometown	School	Height	Weight	40^{‡}	Commit date
Armando Allen; RB	Hialeah, FL	Hialeah-Miami Lakes HS	5 ft 9 in (1.75 m)	183 lb (83 kg)	4.33	Dec 1, 2006
Armando Allen; RB	Recruit ratings: Scout: Rivals: (79)					
Jimmy Clausen; QB	Westlake Village, CA	Oaks Christian HS	6 ft 3 in (1.91 m)	198 lb (90 kg)	4.7	Apr 22, 2006
Jimmy Clausen; QB	Recruit ratings: Scout: Rivals: (86)					
Taylor Dever; OL	Grass Valley, CA	Nevada Union HS	6 ft 6 in (1.98 m)	295 lb (134 kg)	5.2	Dec 16, 2006
Taylor Dever; OL	Recruit ratings: Scout: Rivals: (69)					
Gary Gray; DB	Columbia, SC	Richland Northeast HS	5 ft 10 in (1.78 m)	163 lb (74 kg)	4.5	Sep 18, 2006
Gary Gray; DB	Recruit ratings: Scout: Rivals: (85)					
Robert Hughes; RB	Chicago, IL	Hubbard HS	5 ft 11 in (1.80 m)	226 lb (103 kg)	4.6	Jan 23, 2007
Robert Hughes; RB	Recruit ratings: Scout: Rivals: (79)					
Duval Kamara; WR	Hoboken, NJ	Hoboken HS	6 ft 4 in (1.93 m)	200 lb (91 kg)	4.6	May 10, 2006
Duval Kamara; WR	Recruit ratings: Scout: Rivals: (82)					
Aaron Nagel; LB	Lemont, IL	Lemont Twp HS	6 ft 1 in (1.85 m)	215 lb (98 kg)	4.52	Mar 4, 2006
Aaron Nagel; LB	Recruit ratings: Scout: Rivals: (77)					
Kerry Neal; DE	Bunn, NC	Bunn HS	6 ft 4 in (1.93 m)	233 lb (106 kg)	4.7	Feb 24, 2006
Kerry Neal; DE	Recruit ratings: Scout: Rivals: (84)					
Andrew Nuss; OL	Ashburn, VA	Stone Bridge HS	6 ft 5 in (1.96 m)	290 lb (130 kg)	5.1	Jun 29, 2006
Andrew Nuss; OL	Recruit ratings: Scout: Rivals: (78)					
Emeka Nwankwo; OL	Hollywood, FL	Chaminade Madonna College Prep	6 ft 4 in (1.93 m)	278 lb (126 kg)	5.27	Nov 6, 2006
Emeka Nwankwo; OL	Recruit ratings: Scout: Rivals: (79)					
Steve Paskorz; ATH	Allison Park, PA	Hampton HS	6 ft 1 in (1.85 m)	215 lb (98 kg)	4.6	May 24, 2006
Steve Paskorz; ATH	Recruit ratings: Scout: Rivals: (77)					
Mike Ragone; TE	Cherry Hill, NJ	Camden Catholic	6 ft 4 in (1.93 m)	221 lb (100 kg)	4.5	Apr 30, 2006
Mike Ragone; TE	Recruit ratings: Scout: Rivals: (81)					
Matt Romine; OL	Tulsa, OK	Union HS	6 ft 6 in (1.98 m)	278 lb (126 kg)	5.2	Jan 6, 2007
Matt Romine; OL	Recruit ratings: Scout: Rivals: (80)					
Brian Smith; LB	Overland Park, KS	St. Thomas Aquinas HS	6 ft 2 in (1.88 m)	222 lb (101 kg)	4.72	Jan 30, 2007
Brian Smith; LB	Recruit ratings: Scout: Rivals: (79)					
Harrison Smith; S	Knoxville, TN	Knoxville Catholic HS	6 ft 2 in (1.88 m)	201 lb (91 kg)	4.38	Dec 22, 2006
Harrison Smith; S	Recruit ratings: Scout: Rivals: (78)					
Golden Tate; WR	Hendersonville, TN	John Paul II HS	5 ft 11 in (1.80 m)	175 lb (79 kg)	4.22	Dec 12, 2006
Golden Tate; WR	Recruit ratings: Scout: Rivals: (85)					
Brandon Walker; K	Findlay, OH	Findlay HS	6 ft 2 in (1.88 m)	190 lb (86 kg)	NA	Jan 30, 2007
Brandon Walker; K	Recruit ratings: Scout: Rivals: (40)					
Ian Williams; DT	Longwood, FL	Lyman HS	6 ft 2 in (1.88 m)	292 lb (132 kg)	5.1	Dec 12, 2006
Ian Williams; DT	Recruit ratings: Scout: Rivals: (79)					
Overall recruit ranking: Scout: #11 Rivals: #7
‡ Refers to 40-yard dash; Note: In many cases, Scout, Rivals, 247Sports, On3, and ESPN may conflict in their listings of height, weight and 40 time.; In these cases, the average was taken. ESPN grades are on a 100-point scale.; Sources: "Notre Dame Commit List 2007". Rivals.; "Scout.com Football Recruiting: Notre Dame". Scout.; "2007 Player Commitments – Notre Dame". ESPN.; "Scout.com Team Recruiting Rankings". Scout.; "2007 Team Ranking". Rivals.com.

== Statistics ==
Passing

1. Jimmy Clausen - 138 of 245 (56.3%) for 1,254 yards, 7 touchdowns, 6 interceptions, 103.85 efficiency rating
2. Evan Sharpley - 77 of 145 (55.0%) for 736 yards, 5 toucchdowns, 3 interceptions, 106.66 efficiency rating

Rushing

1. James Aldridge - 463 yards on 121 carries, 3.8-yard average, 0 touchdowns
2. Armando Allen - 348 yards on 86 carries, 4.0-yard average, 0 touchdowns
3. Robert Hughes - 294 yards on 53 carries, 5.5-yard average, 4 touchdowns
4. Travis Thomas - 58 yards on 27 carries, 2.1-yard average, 5 touhdowns

Receiving

1. John Carlson - 40 receptions for 372 yards, 9.3-yard average, 3 touchdowns
2. Duval Kamara - 32 receptions for 357 yards, 11.2-yard average, 4 touchdowns
3. Robby Parris - 29 receptions for 361 yards, 12.4-yard average, 1 touchdown
4. David Grimes - 27 receptions for 224 yards, 8.3-yard average, 2 touchdowns
5. George West - 21 receptions for 172 yards, 8.2-yard average, 0 touchdowns
6. Golden Tate - 6 receptions for 131 yards, 21.8-yard average, 1 touchdown
7. Armando Allen - 24 receptions for 124 yards, 5.2-yard average, 1 touchdown
8. Junior Jabbie - 14 receptions for 123 yards, 8.8-yard average, 0 touchdowns

Tackles

1. Trevor Laws - 112 total tackles, 53 solo tackles, 8.0 tackles for loss, 4.0 sacks
2. Joe Brockington - 108 total tackles, 52 solo tackles, 8.5 tackles for loss, 1.0 sack
3. David Bruton - 85 total tackles, 55 solo tackles, 4.5 tackles for loss, 1.0 sack
4. Maurice Crum Jr. - 84 total takles, 35 solo tackles, 4.5 tackles for loss, 1.0 sack
5. Tom Zbikowski - 80 total tackles, 42 solo tackles, 1.5 tackles for loss, 1.0 sack

== Awards and honors ==
No Notre Dame players won first-team honors on the 2007 All-America college football team.

Freshman nose tackle Ian Williams was named to the 2007 AON Insurance Freshman All-America Team, the Football Writers Association of America announced during their annual banquet. He was one of six true freshmen named to the defensive unit on the FWAA Freshman All-America Team and was one of 13 of the 28 freshman All-America selections who was a true freshman this season. Williams was also named to the CollegeFootballNews.com all-freshman third team and was an honorable mention member of The Sporting News all-freshman team.

Seniors John Carlson and Trevor Laws received second-team Academic All-American honors from ESPN The Magazine and the College Sports Information Directors of America (CoSIDA).

== 2008 NFL draft ==
Four Notre Dame players were drafted in the 2008 NFL draft. Senior tight end John Carlson went 38th overall to the Seattle Seahawks. Later in the second round, DE Trevor Laws was selected by the Philadelphia Eagles at 47th overall. In the third round, safety Tom Zibikowski was the 86th selection, going to the Baltimore Ravens. Center John Sullivan was the final Notre Dame draftee, going to the Minnesota Vikings in the sixth round. Three players that were not drafted quickly signed with NFL teams as free agents following the NFL Draft: linebacker Joe Brockington signed with the Buffalo Bills, long snapper J.J. Jansen signed with the Green Bay Packers, while running back Travis Thomas joined former teammate and co-captain Brady Quinn in Cleveland.
