= Abiamiri =

Abiamiri is a surname. Notable people with the surname include:

- Rob Abiamiri (born 1982), American football player
- Victor Abiamiri (born 1986), American football player, brother of Rob
