= John Carlson (American football) =

American football player (born 1984)

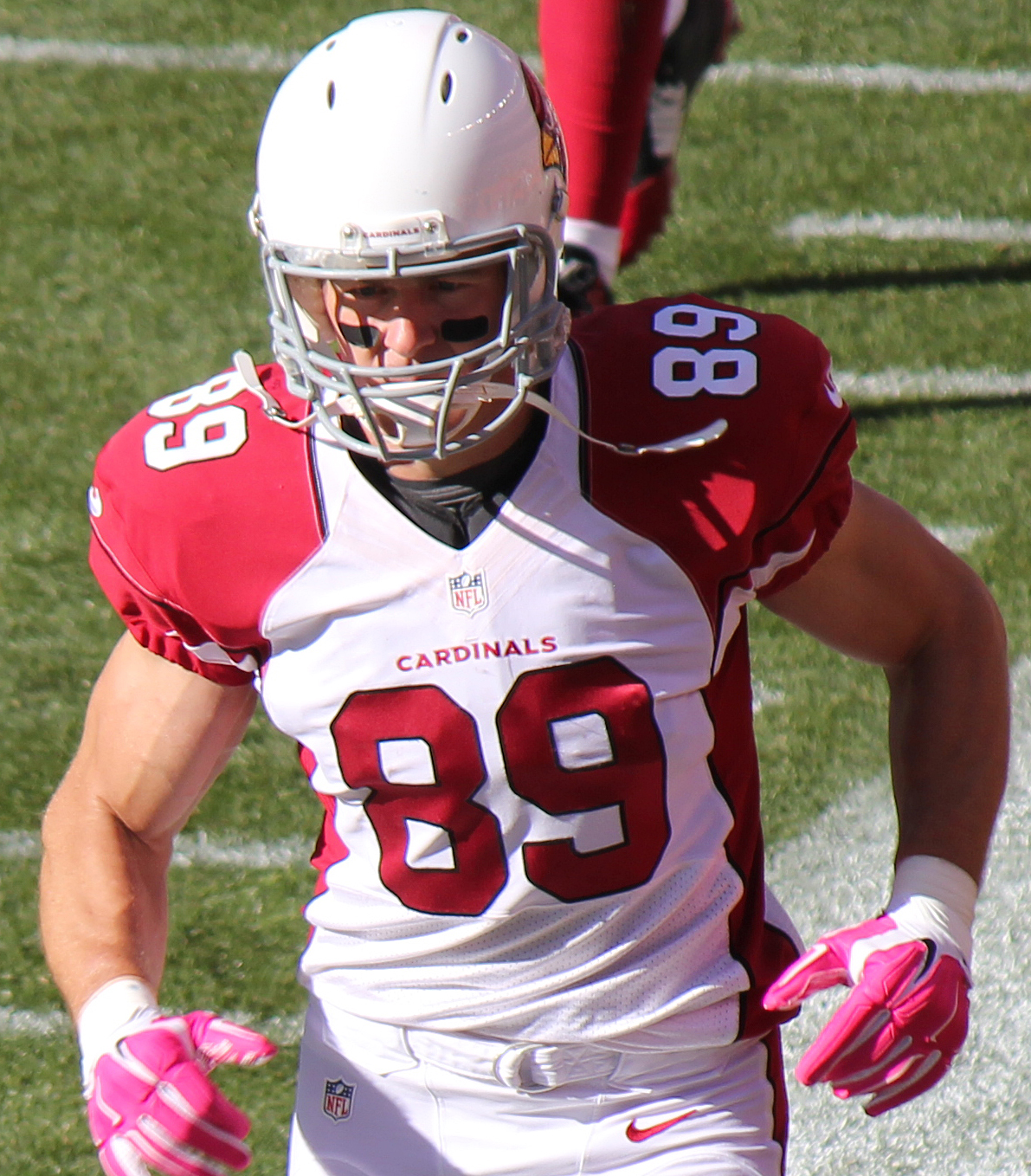
- Carlson with the Arizona Cardinals in 2014

No. 89
- Position: Tight end

Personal information
- Born: May 12, 1984 (age 42); St. Cloud, Minnesota, U.S.
- Listed height: 6 ft 5 in (1.96 m)
- Listed weight: 248 lb (112 kg)

Career information
- High school: Litchfield (Litchfield, Minnesota)
- College: Notre Dame (2003–2007)
- NFL draft: 2008: 2nd round, 38th overall pick

Career history
- Seattle Seahawks (2008–2011); Minnesota Vikings (2012–2013); Arizona Cardinals (2014)

Awards and highlights
- PFWA All-Rookie Team (2008); Seattle Seahawks 35th Anniversary team; Second-team All-American (2006)

Career NFL statistics
- Receptions: 210
- Receiving yards: 2,256
- Receiving touchdowns: 15
- Stats at Pro Football Reference

John David Carlson Jr. (born May 12, 1984) is an American former professional football player who was a tight end in the National Football League (NFL). He was selected by the Seattle Seahawks in the second round of the 2008 NFL draft, and later played for the Minnesota Vikings and Arizona Cardinals. He played college football for the Notre Dame Fighting Irish.

== Early life ==
Carlson was born in St. Cloud, Minnesota, though his family moved to Litchfield right after his birth. As a football player at Litchfield High School, he was all-state in Minnesota his senior year. He played in the 2003 U.S. Army All-American Bowl alongside fellow Notre Dame Fighting Irish players Brady Quinn, Ryan Harris, and Tom Zbikowski. As a basketball player, Carlson was voted to the preseason McDonald's All-American list. He led the Litchfield Dragons to three state basketball titles during his freshman, junior and senior years. Carlson was also an all-state tennis player. His father, John Sr., is the former basketball and tennis coach for the Litchfield Dragons.

== College career ==
Carlson played college football at Notre Dame, where he was a two-year starter at tight end. He was named captain in his junior and senior seasons, 2006 and 2007. He recorded 100 receptions, 1,093 receiving yards and 8 total touchdowns in his career. He lived in St. Edward's Hall, the oldest residence hall on campus, where his roommate was John Sullivan, current NFL free agent who last played for the Los Angeles Rams.

== Professional career ==
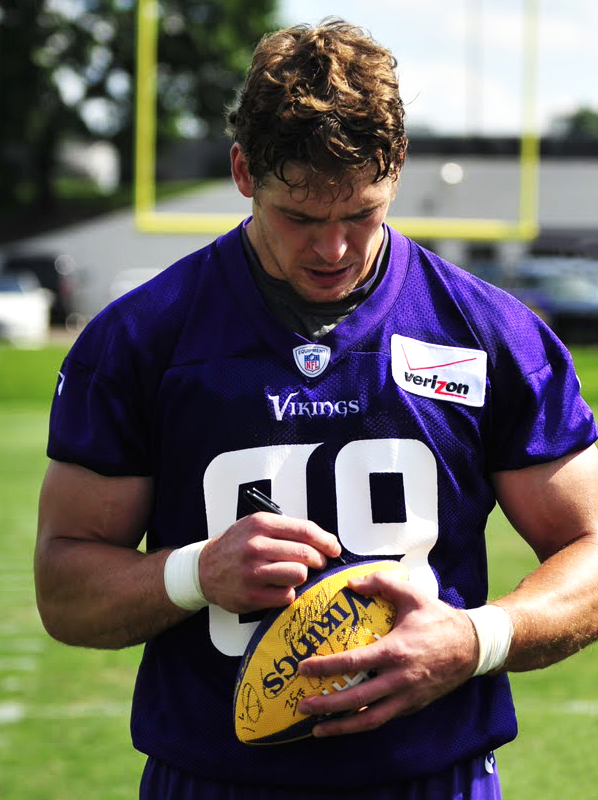
Carlson in 2013

Pre-draft measurables
Height	Weight	Arm length	Hand span	40-yard dash	10-yard split	20-yard split	20-yard shuttle	Three-cone drill	Vertical jump	Broad jump	Bench press	Wonderlic
6 ft 5 1/8 in (1.96 m)	256 lb (116 kg)	34 1/4 in (0.87 m)	10 1/8 in (0.26 m)	4.72 s	1.67 s	2.74 s	4.28 s	7.12 s	35.5 in (0.90 m)	9 ft 5 in (2.87 m)	20 reps	40
40 yard dash and Vertical Jump from Pro Day. Other values from NFL Combine

=== Seattle Seahawks ===
Carlson was selected by the Seahawks in the second round (38th overall) of the 2008 NFL draft. On July 26, he signed a $4.52 million contract which included $2.5 million guaranteed.

He scored his first NFL touchdown on a pass from Charlie Frye in week 6 of the 2008 NFL season in a 17–27 loss to Green Bay. In a season marred by injuries for the Seahawks, particularly at wide receiver, Carlson proved to be a reliable target throughout the season, and led the team in receptions (55) and receiving yards (627) for the 2008 season, a feat not accomplished in franchise history by a rookie since Hall of Fame WR Steve Largent.

Carlson had a notable performance in the Seahawks' 2010 playoffs, catching two touchdown passes in a win over the defending Super Bowl champion New Orleans Saints. In the following week's divisional matchup (a loss) against the Chicago Bears, he received a concussion after jumping and being hit in the air and landing on his helmet after receiving a pass near the sideline in snowy Soldier Field.

=== Minnesota Vikings ===
On March 14, 2012, Carlson signed a five-year, $25 million contract with the Minnesota Vikings. In 2013, his contract was restructured, with his base salary reduced from $2.9M to $1.5M, and his workout bonus reduced to $50,000. Paul Allen of KFAN Minnesota once said "the combination of John Carlson and Kyle Rudolph would be the best tight end combination besides Rob Gronkowski and Aaron Hernandez."

=== Arizona Cardinals ===
On March 7, 2014, Carlson signed a two-year, $4.65 million contract with the Arizona Cardinals. On May 5, 2015, Carlson announced his retirement from the NFL.

== NFL career statistics ==
Year	Team	Games		Receiving				
Year	Team	GP	GS	Rec	Yds	Avg	Lng	TD
2008	SEA	16	9	55	627	11.4	33	5
2009	SEA	16	16	51	574	11.3	42	7
2010	SEA	15	13	31	318	10.3	37	1
2011	SEA	0	0	Did not play due to injury				
2012	MIN	14	6	8	43	5.4	14	0
2013	MIN	13	8	32	344	10.8	30	1
2014	ARI	16	12	33	350	10.6	32	1
Career		90	64	210	2,256	10.7	42	15
