= Ryan Harris (American football) =

American football player (born 1985)

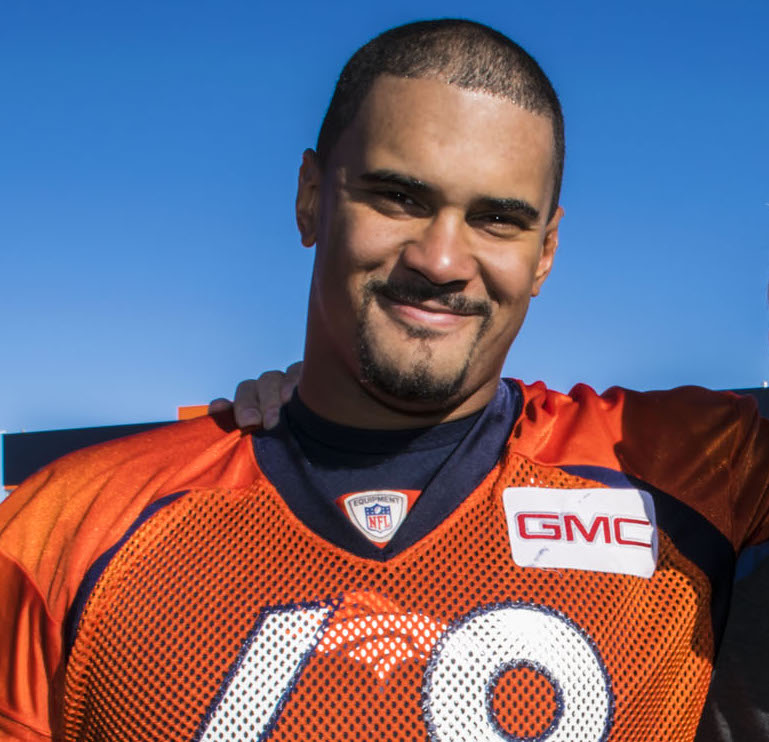
- Harris with the Denver Broncos in 2015

No. 74, 67, 64, 68
- Position: Offensive tackle

Personal information
- Born: March 11, 1985 (age 41); Minneapolis, Minnesota, U.S.
- Listed height: 6 ft 5 in (1.96 m)
- Listed weight: 302 lb (137 kg)

Career information
- High school: Cretin-Derham Hall (Saint Paul, Minnesota)
- College: Notre Dame (2003–2006)
- NFL draft: 2007: 3rd round, 70th overall pick

Career history
- Denver Broncos (2007–2010); Philadelphia Eagles (2011)*; Denver Broncos (2011); Houston Texans (2012–2013); Kansas City Chiefs (2014); Denver Broncos (2015); Pittsburgh Steelers (2016)
- * Offseason or practice squad member only

Awards and highlights
- Super Bowl champion (50)

Career NFL statistics
- Games played: 114
- Games started: 70
- Stats at Pro Football Reference

Ryan Emerson Wilcox Harris (born March 11, 1985) is an American former professional football player who was an offensive tackle in the National Football League (NFL). He was selected by the Denver Broncos in the third round of the 2007 NFL draft and was also a member of the Philadelphia Eagles, Houston Texans, Kansas City Chiefs, and Pittsburgh Steelers. With the Broncos, he won Super Bowl 50 over the Carolina Panthers. He played college football for the Notre Dame Fighting Irish. Ryan Harris works as an analyst for select NFL games on Westwood One.

== Early life ==
Harris attended Cretin-Derham Hall High School in St. Paul, Minnesota and was a letterman in football and wrestling. In wrestling, he was a two-year letterman and an All-Conference honoree. He played in the 2003 U.S. Army All-American Bowl with fellow Notre Dame teammates Brady Quinn, John Carlson, Victor Abiamiri and Tom Zbikowski.

== College career ==
Heavily recruited by Notre Dame, Iowa, Miami (FL), and Michigan, Harris committed to play for the Fighting Irish, where he started at offensive tackle for four seasons.

== Professional career ==
Pre-draft measurables
Height	Weight	Arm length	Hand span	40-yard dash	10-yard split	20-yard split	20-yard shuttle	Three-cone drill	Vertical jump	Broad jump	Bench press
6 ft 4 1/2 in (1.94 m)	305 lb (138 kg)	34 1/4 in (0.87 m)	9 3/8 in (0.24 m)	5.11 s	1.81 s	2.98 s	4.52 s	7.78 s	25.5 in (0.65 m)	8 ft 4 in (2.54 m)	25 reps
All values from NFL Combine/Pro Day

=== Denver Broncos (first stint) ===
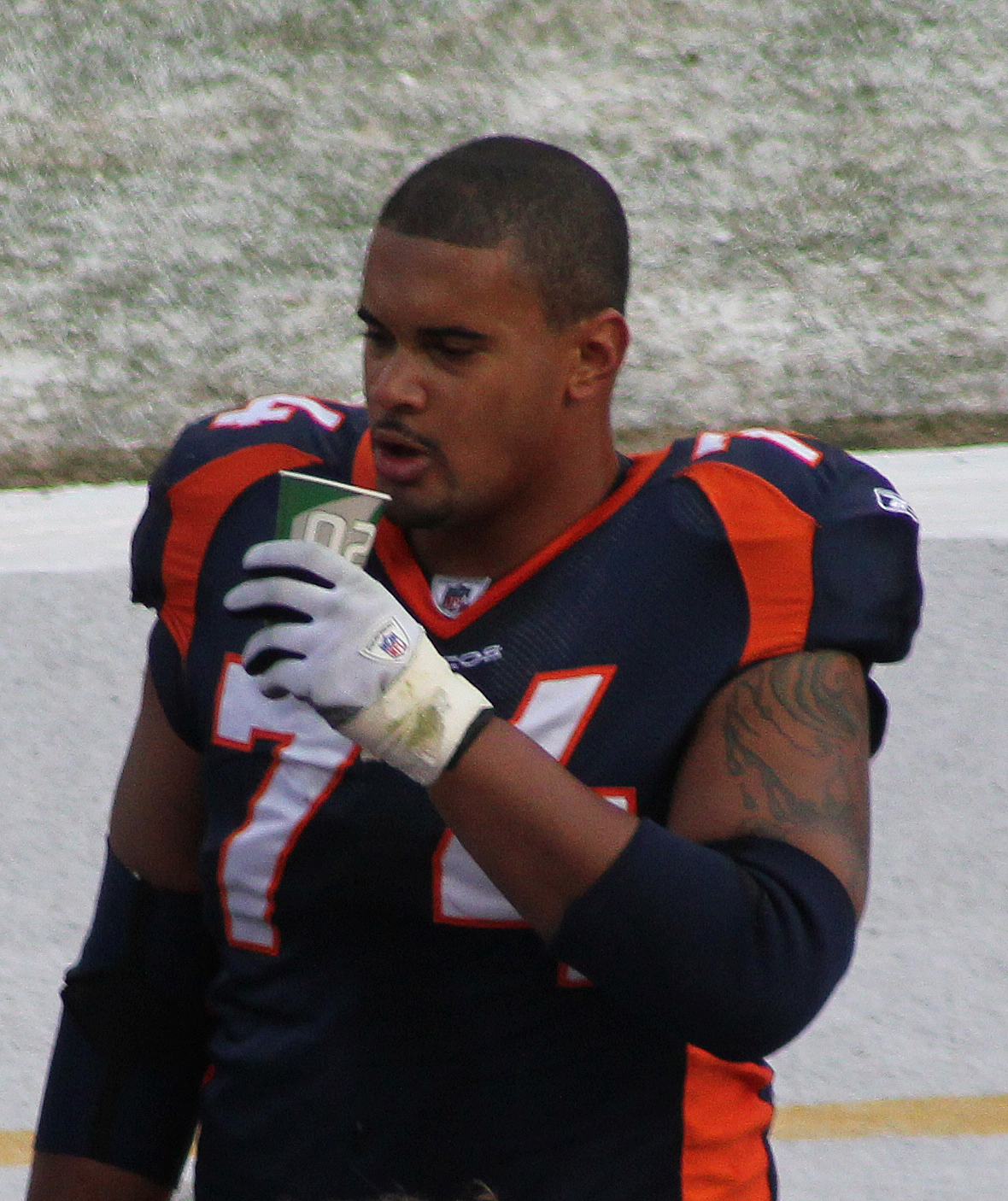
Harris playing for the Broncos in 2010

Harris was selected by the Denver Broncos as a 3rd-round pick (70th overall) in the 2007 NFL draft. In the 2008 season, Harris only allowed 1.5 sacks on QB Jay Cutler.

In the 2009 season, Harris only started and played in 8 games. He dislocated two toes in a game on November 1, 2009. The injury kept him out the rest of season and was placed on Injured Reserve on December 9.

=== Philadelphia Eagles ===
On August 2, 2011, the Philadelphia Eagles signed him to a one-year contract. After undergoing back surgery, Harris was waived/injured on September 3, 2011. He was released with an injury settlement as well.

=== Denver Broncos (second stint) ===
On January 2, 2012, Harris was signed by the Broncos as an injury replacement for Chris Kuper.

Harris was released by the Broncos on August 31, 2012, and signed by the Houston Texans on September 1, 2012, to replace an injured Rashad Butler who was lost for the season to injury.

=== Houston Texans ===
The Houston Texans claimed Harris off waivers on September 3, 2012.

He re-signed with the Texans on April 9, 2013.

=== Kansas City Chiefs ===
On July 24, 2014, Harris signed with the Kansas City Chiefs.

=== Denver Broncos (third stint) ===
Harris signed with the Broncos on May 28, 2015. He was signed to replace injured offensive tackle Ryan Clady who was injured on May 28, 2015, due to an ACL tear sustained during the Broncos' OTA's.

On February 7, 2016, Harris was part of the Broncos team that won Super Bowl 50. In the game, the Broncos defeated the Carolina Panthers by a score of 24–10.

=== Pittsburgh Steelers ===
Harris signed a two-year, $3.2 million contract with the Pittsburgh Steelers on March 15, 2016.

Harris played in 39 of the Steelers offensive snaps before it was announced on October 4, 2016, that he was questionable for the Week 5 matchup against the New York Jets. He was ruled out due to a shin/hematoma injury. On October 8, 2016, Harris was placed on injured reserve and was ruled out for the rest of the season.

On March 3, 2017, Harris announced his retirement from professional football.

== Personal life ==
Harris is a devout Muslim. Before finding his faith, he was raised in the church of Unitarian Universalism, at Unity Church Unitarian in St. Paul. In the summer before attending Notre Dame, Harris was featured on the MTV show True Life in a documentary entitled "I Want the Perfect Body", back in 2003. He is currently an on-air host at KKSE-FM radio.
