= Hannah & Friends Foundation =

Non-Profit Organization

Hannah & Friends is a 501(c)(3) non-profit organization dedicated to improving the quality of life for individuals special needs. It was founded in 2004 by American football coach Charlie Weis and his wife, Maura. It is named for their daughter, Hannah, who is autistic. Hannah & Friends owns a 40-acre (160,000 m^{2}) property north of South Bend, Indiana which serves as both a residential community for adults and site of activities for special needs children. From 2004 until 2008, the charity hosted the annual Kickoff for Charity dinner, featuring Weis and fellow past Notre Dame coaches Ara Parseghian and Lou Holtz.
