= Trevor Laws =

American football player (born 1985)

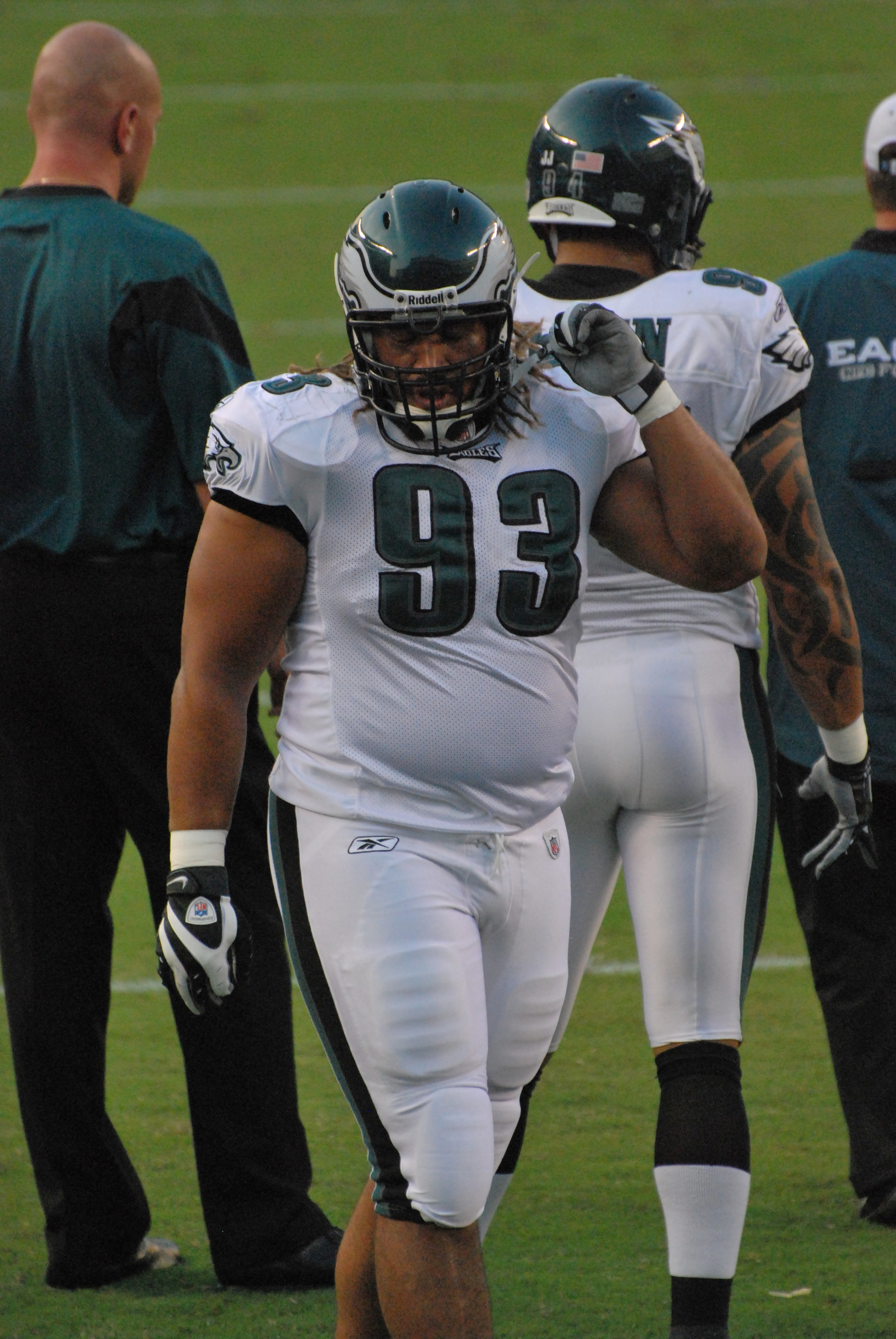
- Laws with the Philadelphia Eagles in 2009

No. 93, 91
- Position: Defensive tackle

Personal information
- Born: June 14, 1985 (age 41); Dayton, Ohio, U.S.
- Listed height: 6 ft 1 in (1.85 m)
- Listed weight: 304 lb (138 kg)

Career information
- High school: Apple Valley (Apple Valley, Minnesota)
- College: Notre Dame (2003–2007)
- NFL draft: 2008: 2nd round, 47th overall pick

Career history
- Philadelphia Eagles (2008–2011); St. Louis Rams (2012)

Career NFL statistics
- Total tackles: 57
- Sacks: 5
- Forced fumbles: 1
- Fumble recoveries: 1
- Interceptions: 1
- Stats at Pro Football Reference

Trevor David Laws (born June 14, 1985) is an American former professional football player who was a defensive tackle in the National Football League (NFL). After playing college football for the Notre Dame Fighting Irish, he was selected by the Philadelphia Eagles in the second round of the 2008 NFL draft. He played for the Eagles for four seasons from 2008 to 2011 and spent the 2012 season with the St. Louis Rams on their injured reserve list.

== Early life ==
Laws was born in Dayton, Ohio, and played high school football and wrestled at Apple Valley High School in Apple Valley, Minnesota. In football, Laws played fullback, linebacker, and defensive lineman. Laws was named Minnesota's Gatorade Player of the Year and was a first-team ESPN.com All-American. In wrestling, he led his team to three consecutive state championships in his sophomore, junior, and senior years. During his junior year, he had a wrestling record of 49-0, and was considered the best heavyweight wrestler in the nation. He was a three-time All-American in wrestling.

== College career ==
At Notre Dame, Laws was a roommate of future Eagles teammate Victor Abiamiri. In 2007, Laws led the Fighting Irish with 4.0 sacks and 112 tackles, both career highs. He had the most tackles by a defensive lineman in the major college ranks in 2007.

== Professional career ==
=== Philadelphia Eagles ===
Laws was selected by the Philadelphia Eagles in the second round of the 2008 NFL draft. In his rookie year, he played in all 16 games, and made 12 tackles. He also made four tackles in the playoffs. In 2009, Laws played in 11 games and made 10 tackles.

=== St. Louis Rams ===
The St. Louis Rams signed Laws to a one-year contract on April 11, 2012. Laws spent the entire 2012 season on the Rams' injured reserve list, not appearing in a single game with the team.

== Personal life ==
Laws has two brothers, both of whom attended the University of Minnesota. Laws majored in marketing at the University of Notre Dame.
