= Litchfield Senior High School =

Coordinates: 45.13585°N 94.52132°W

- 901 North Gilman Avenue, Litchfield, Minnesota 55355; United States

Information
- Type: Public high school
- Established: 1880
- School district: ISD #465
- Superintendent: Beckie Simenson
- Principal: Jason Michels
- Faculty: 23.01 (FTE)
- Grades: 9–12
- Enrollment: 449 (2022–2023)
- Student to teacher ratio: 19.51
- Colors: Green, Black, & White
- Team name: Dragons
- Website: Litchfield High School

Litchfield Senior High is a public high school in Litchfield, Minnesota, United States. Established in 1880. The official school colors are Green, Black, and White, with the mascot of the Dragons. The student body consists of approximately 548, with a total of about 1,700 students for District 465. This allows for an average of a 15:1 student ratio.

== Sports ==
- Baseball (Boys)
- Basketball (Boys/Girls)
- Cross Country (Boys/Girls)
- Dance Team (Girls)
- Football (Boys)
- Golf (Boys/Girls)
- Gymnastics (Girls)
- Ice Hockey (Boys/Girls)
- Softball (Girls)
- Tennis (Boys/Girls)
- Track and Field (Boys/Girls)
- Wrestling (Boys)
- Swimming/Diving (Boys/Girls)
- Volleyball (Girls)

== Notable alumni ==
- John Carlson – Former NFL Tight End. Over his 7 year career, he played for the Seattle Seahawks (2008–2011), Minnesota Vikings (2012–2013), and Arizona Cardinals (2014).
- Cassandra Jopp – Karaoke World Champion 2011.
