= Travis Thomas =

American football player (born 1984)

Profile
- Position: Running back

Personal information
- Born: December 3, 1984 (age 41); Washington, Pennsylvania, U.S.
- Listed height: 6 ft 1 in (1.85 m)
- Listed weight: 215 lb (98 kg)

Career information
- High school: Washington
- College: Notre Dame
- NFL draft: 2008: undrafted

Career history
- Cleveland Browns (2008)*
- * Offseason or practice squad member only

Travis John Thomas (born December 3, 1984) is an American former professional football player who was a running back in the National Football League (NFL). He played college football for the Notre Dame Fighting Irish and was signed by the Cleveland Browns as an undrafted free agent in 2008.

== Early life ==
Thomas graduated from Washington High School after a stellar football career. He won SuperPrep All-American honors, with a total of 2730 rushing yards, 25 receptions for 420 yards, and 56 touchdowns in his career. He also played outside linebacker in 2002 and made 137 tackles, which helped bring his team to a 15–0 season and a Pennsylvania Class AA state title. He was awarded MVP two years, and also won the scholar-athlete award at the U.S. Army All-American Bowl.

== College career ==
During the 2005 College Football season, Thomas saw action chiefly on special teams (in all 12 games) and also as a reserve halfback (in 10 games). As halfback he rushed 63 times for 248 yards with a total of five touchdowns. On special teams, he made a total of 132 appearances throughout the season with seven tackles.

In 2006, he was moved to the position of linebacker because of his speed and physicality with Coach Charlie Weis's blessing and was appointed captain of special teams. He proved valuable to the Irish as a flexible player with his ability to play both offense and defense.

Thomas moved back to halfback for the 2007 season and was named a captain along with Tom Zbikowski, Maurice Crum Jr., John Sullivan, and John Carlson. He served primarily as a goalline back and led the team in rushing touchdowns.

== Professional career ==
=== Cleveland Browns ===
Thomas went undrafted in the 2008 NFL draft and was subsequently signed by the Cleveland Browns. He was waived/injured on August 30.
