= Rob Abiamiri =

American football player (born 1982)

Profile
- Position: Tight end

Personal information
- Born: December 21, 1982 (age 43); Baltimore, Maryland, U.S.
- Listed height: 6 ft 2 in (1.88 m)
- Listed weight: 240 lb (109 kg)

Career information
- High school: Mount Saint Joseph (Baltimore)
- College: Maryland

Career history
- 2005–2007: Baltimore Ravens*
- * Offseason or practice squad member only

Rob Abiamiri (born December 21, 1982) is an American former football tight end. Abiamiri was signed as an undrafted free agent by the Baltimore Ravens after the 2005 NFL draft following his career at Maryland. After being allocated to NFL Europa and spending the 2007 season as a member of the Berlin Thunder, Abiamiri was released by the Ravens on July 23, 2007, due to injuries and later decided to retire after not being signed by any other teams. Abiamiri attended Mount Saint Joseph High School in Baltimore, Maryland. Rob is the brother of Philadelphia Eagles defensive end, Victor Abiamiri and Paschal Abiamiri who also played football at the University of Maryland.
