= Charlie Weis =

American football coach (born 1956)

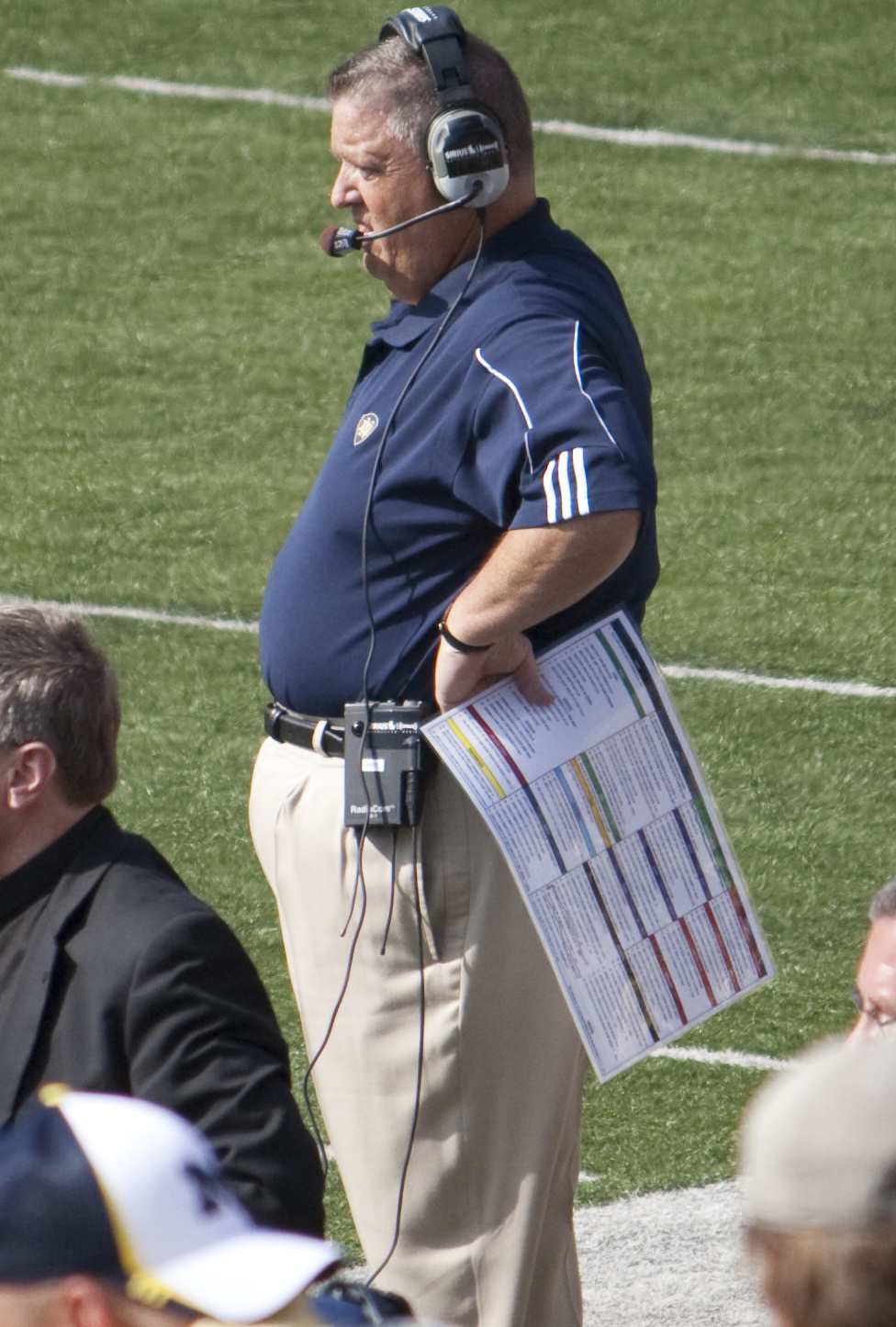
- Weis with Notre Dame in 2009

Biographical details
- Born: March 30, 1956 (age 70); Trenton, New Jersey, U.S.
- Education: Notre Dame

Coaching career (HC unless noted)
- 1979: Boonton HS (NJ) (assistant)
- 1980–1984: Morristown HS (NJ) (assistant)
- 1985: South Carolina (GA/DB)
- 1986: South Carolina (GA/LB)
- 1987: South Carolina (volunteer/DE)
- 1988: South Carolina (ARC)
- 1989: Franklin HS (NJ)
- 1990: New York Giants (assistant)
- 1991–1992: New York Giants (RB)
- 1993–1994: New England Patriots (TE)
- 1995: New England Patriots (RB)
- 1996: New England Patriots (WR)
- 1997–1999: New York Jets (OC)
- 2000–2004: New England Patriots (OC)
- 2005–2009: Notre Dame
- 2010: Kansas City Chiefs (OC)
- 2011: Florida (OC)
- 2012–2014: Kansas

Head coaching record
- Overall: 41–49
- Bowls: 1–2

Accomplishments and honors

Championships
- 4× Super Bowl champion (XXV, XXXVI, XXXVIII, XXXIX)

Charles Joseph Weis Sr. (born March 30, 1956) is an American former football coach. He was the head coach for the Notre Dame Fighting Irish from 2005 to 2009 and the Kansas Jayhawks from 2012 to 2014. He also served as an offensive coordinator in the National Football League (NFL) for the New York Jets, New England Patriots, and Kansas City Chiefs. Weis most recently hosted "Airing It Out," along with Bob Papa, on SiriusXM NFL Radio.

== Coaching career ==
After graduating from Notre Dame in 1978, Weis began his coaching career at Boonton High School in New Jersey. He spent the next five seasons at perennial powerhouse Morristown High School in New Jersey as a football assistant developing players such as Michael Landsberg. In 1985, he was hired by head coach Joe Morrison at the University of South Carolina, where he received his master's degree in education while working as a graduate assistant position coach and assistant recruiting coordinator. He served four seasons on the Gamecock staff until Morrison died in 1989. He then returned to New Jersey as the head coach at Franklin High School and directed Franklin Township to the New Jersey state championship while also assisting in the New York Giants' pro personnel department.

=== Early years ===
Weis launched his professional coaching career in 1990 when he was named offensive assistant and assistant special teams coach under Giants head coach Bill Parcells. The Giants went on to win Super Bowl XXV at the end of that season, beating the Buffalo Bills by a score of 20–19.

After Ray Handley took over as head coach in 1991, Weis stayed on as the running back coach for two seasons. In 1991, he helped guide 2nd year running back Rodney Hampton to 1,059 yards and 10 touchdowns on the ground. The Giants finished 6th in rushing yards and 7th in rushing touchdowns in the NFL. The next year, Weis utilized both Hampton (1,141 yards and 14 touchdowns) and Jarrod Bunch (501 yards and 3 touchdowns) to form a potent running back combination. The Giants finished 6th in rushing yards and 2nd in rushing touchdowns in the NFL.

After that he began a four-year stint with the New England Patriots. For the first two years (1993–1994), Weis served as the tight end coach. In 1995, he would switch to running back coach and finished 1996 as wide receiver coach. In 1993, he helped Ben Coates break out with 659 yards and 8 touchdowns. Marv Cook proved a reliable blocker as well. In 1994, Coates had one of the best seasons by a tight end ever with 96 catches, 1174 yards, and 7 touchdowns. In 1995, Weis helped turn rookie Curtis Martin's year into a Pro Bowl season with 1,487 yards and 14 touchdowns on the ground. Dave Meggett and Sam Gash proved to be reliable receivers out of the backfield as well with a combined 78 catches. Terry Glenn broke out with 90 catches for 1,132 yards and 6 touchdowns. Weis also helped wide receiver Shawn Jefferson put up 771 yards and 4 touchdowns along with developing Troy Brown into a solid role player with 21 catches for 222 yards.

In 1997, Weis became the offensive coordinator of the Jets, in addition to duties as the team's primary receivers coach. In his second year as offensive coordinator, the Jets finished fourth in the National Football League in offense. Weis served as the team's offensive coordinator from 1997 to 1999.

=== New England Patriots ===
Weis returned to New England Patriots following Parcells' announced retirement after the 1999 season. He served as offensive coordinator under head coach Bill Belichick from 2000 through 2004, installing the Erhardt-Perkins offensive system, and assisting the Patriots in three Super Bowl victories (XXXVI, XXXVIII, XXXIX).

=== Notre Dame ===
On November 30, 2004, after finishing its football season with a 6–5 record, Notre Dame released head coach Tyrone Willingham. After first choice Urban Meyer accepted the head coaching position at the University of Florida, Notre Dame hired Weis on December 12, 2004, as the 28th football coach in the school's history with a six-year contract worth a reported US$2 million per year. He was the first Notre Dame graduate to hold the position since Hugh Devore (a 1934 graduate) served as interim coach in 1945 and 1963, and the first alumnus to serve as the Irish football coach on a full-fledged basis since Joe Kuharich (a 1938 Notre Dame graduate), who coached in South Bend from 1959 to 1962.

2005

In his first season as head coach of the Fighting Irish, Weis was widely quoted as telling his team that they would have a "decided schematic advantage" against their opponents, apparently in the belief that his schemes and strategies developed in the NFL were superior to the schemes being run by other college coaches. Indeed, the team's play, particularly that of junior quarterback Brady Quinn and junior wide receiver Jeff Samardzija, improved greatly. Samardzija, previously a little-used wide receiver, became Quinn's favorite target and a frequent game-breaker, and set school records for most touchdown receptions in a season (15), most receiving yardage in a season (1,249), and most consecutive games with a touchdown reception (8), after having no touchdown receptions in his previous two years at Notre Dame. Notre Dame lost to Michigan State in a dramatic overtime loss. Weis was quoted as saying they would never again lose to Michigan State on his watch. He went 2–3 against the Spartans over his career.

With a record of 9–2, his team finished the regular season ranked sixth in the Bowl Championship Series (BCS) standings, granting them a berth in the 2006 Fiesta Bowl in Tempe, Arizona, on January 2, 2006, which they lost to the Ohio State Buckeyes by a score of 34–20. The Irish finished ninth in the final AP Poll and eleventh in the Coaches Poll. His team's success on the field helped make Weis winner of the 2005 Eddie Robinson Coach of the Year Award, selected by the Football Writers Association of America.

On October 29, 2005, barely halfway through the first year of a six-year contract, and with a 5–2 record, Weis signed a contract extension with Notre Dame. The new 10-year deal, which began with the 2006 season, and which was to be worth a reported $30–40 million, would keep Weis at Notre Dame through 2015.

2006

During the 2006 season, Weis led the Fighting Irish to a 10–2 regular season record, and a second straight BCS berth, this time losing 41–14 in the Sugar Bowl to the LSU Tigers. This loss was the second straight bowl loss under Weis and the ninth straight bowl loss for the Irish. The Irish finished No. 17 in the final AP poll, and No. 19 in the final Coaches' Poll. While this season could be considered a disappointment based on Notre Dame's No. 2 pre-season ranking, Weis led the Irish to its second straight season of nine wins or more, something not achieved since the 1992 and 1993 seasons under Lou Holtz. Also for the second straight year Weis put together a top 10 recruiting class, including national player of the year Jimmy Clausen.

2007

In the 2007 season, Notre Dame went 3–9, with their only wins coming against UCLA, Duke and Stanford. Their loss to Navy on November 3 snapped an NCAA-record 43-game winning streak over the Midshipmen, dating back to the Heisman Trophy-winning tenure of Roger Staubach at the Naval Academy. The team ranked near the bottom of Division I FBS in both rushing yards per game and total yards per game. Along with being third from last in scoring per game, the team was shut out twice en route to its first nine-loss season ever. Weis attributed the team's downfall to his own mistakes, including his failure to use full-speed practices and to develop his players properly, his installation of two separate offensive systems, one for each potential starting quarterback, as well as to the graduation of star quarterback Brady Quinn. Despite the poor season, which was Notre Dame's worst ever (by losses), Weis nonetheless managed to recruit one of the top recruiting classes in the country.

2008

In 2008, The Irish started 4–1, but completed the regular season with a 6–6 record, including a 24–23 loss to Syracuse, the first time that Notre Dame had fallen to an eight-loss team. The combined 15 losses from 2007 to 2008 marks the most losses for any two-year span. Despite speculation the university might fire Weis, Notre Dame retained Weis for the 2009 season. Weis's Notre Dame squad ended the season on a positive note, finally breaking the Irish's NCAA record nine-game bowl losing streak by beating Hawaii 49–21. In the process, Notre Dame scored its highest point total of the season, its highest point total ever in a bowl game, and broke 8 other bowl records. The bowl win also helped Notre Dame to a 7–6 final record, its 102nd winning season in 120 years of football and Weis' third in four years. Notre Dame ended the year with a top 15 recruiting class, including signing the top defensive player in the nation.

2009

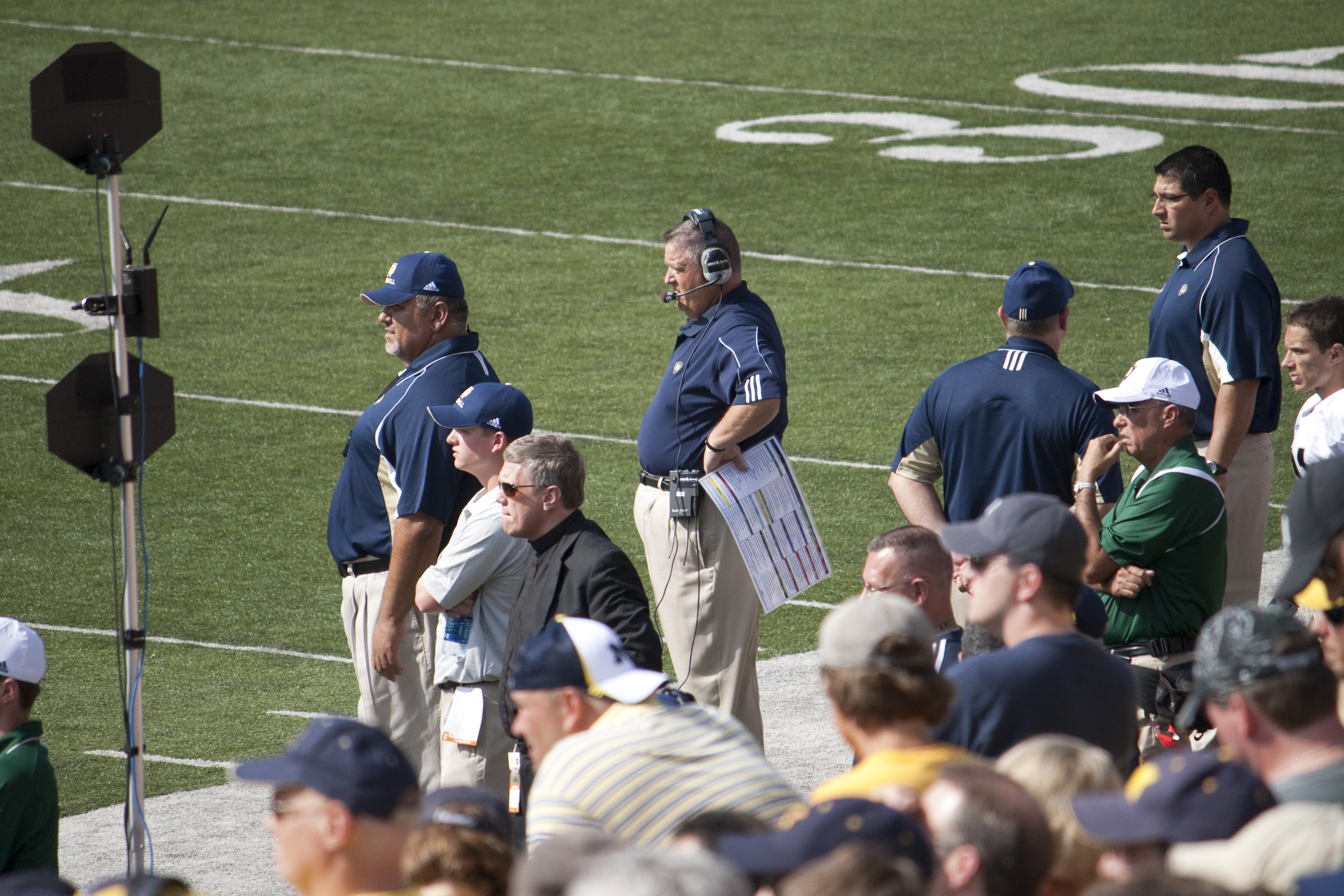
Weis on the sidelines during the 2009 season

The Fighting Irish finished the 2009 regular season with a 6–6 record. A poor record for the season in addition to high preseason expectations for the team, including a preseason top 25 ranking, caused widespread speculation that Notre Dame would fire Weis. Weis was fired on November 30, 2009. He was succeeded by Brian Kelly.

=== Kansas City Chiefs ===
Weis was named offensive coordinator of the Kansas City Chiefs for 2010. In Weis's first year, the Chiefs improved from a record of 4–12 to 10–6 and returned to the playoffs after winning the AFC West Division. With Weis as offensive coordinator, the Chiefs had the NFL's best rushing attack, averaging an impressive 165 yards per game on the ground. Offensively the Chiefs ranked 9th in total offense, 11th in points per game, and 1st in rushing, but 28th in passing. However, the Chiefs also sent four players on offense (WR Dwayne Bowe, RB Jamaal Charles, QB Matt Cassel and OG Brian Waters) to the Pro Bowl. Cassel, Bowe and Charles made their first ever trip to the Pro Bowl. Weis has also been credited with the improvement of Cassel who had a career year throwing for 27 touchdowns and only 5 interceptions in 14 games.

=== Florida ===
On December 31, 2010, ESPN reported that Weis was targeted by the Florida Gators to become the next offensive coordinator under new head coach Will Muschamp. On January 2, 2011, Chiefs coach Todd Haley announced Weis would indeed be leaving for the Florida offensive coordinator position effective at the end of the season. Weis' tenure was broadly criticized after the team finished ranked 102nd nationally with just 334.17 yards per game.

=== Kansas ===
On December 8, 2011, Weis was named the head football coach for the University of Kansas replacing Turner Gill. He initially stated that he would not stay longer than the duration of his five-year contract, which would have run out in 2016, but school officials persuaded him to consider a longer stay. His 2012 team struggled to a 1–11 record in what was dubbed as a rebuilding year. Weis' 2013 team showed signs of improvement. Although they only compiled a 3–9 record, Weis' Jayhawks ended a 27-game Big 12 Conference losing streak with a 31–19 home victory over West Virginia in November 2013. Weis was fired on September 28, 2014, four games into the season. School officials did not believe the Jayhawks had made enough strides on the field during Weis' tenure. According to ESPN, they were also concerned about declining attendance. Despite pleas from Weis, only 36,900 people came to what would be his final game in Lawrence, against Texas.

Weis would leave his successor David Beaty with just 39 scholarship players for the 2015 spring practice, which would decline to just 28 scholarship players when the 2015 season actually began. Kansas would not reach the FBS limit of 85 scholarship players until the 2023 season.

== Personal life ==
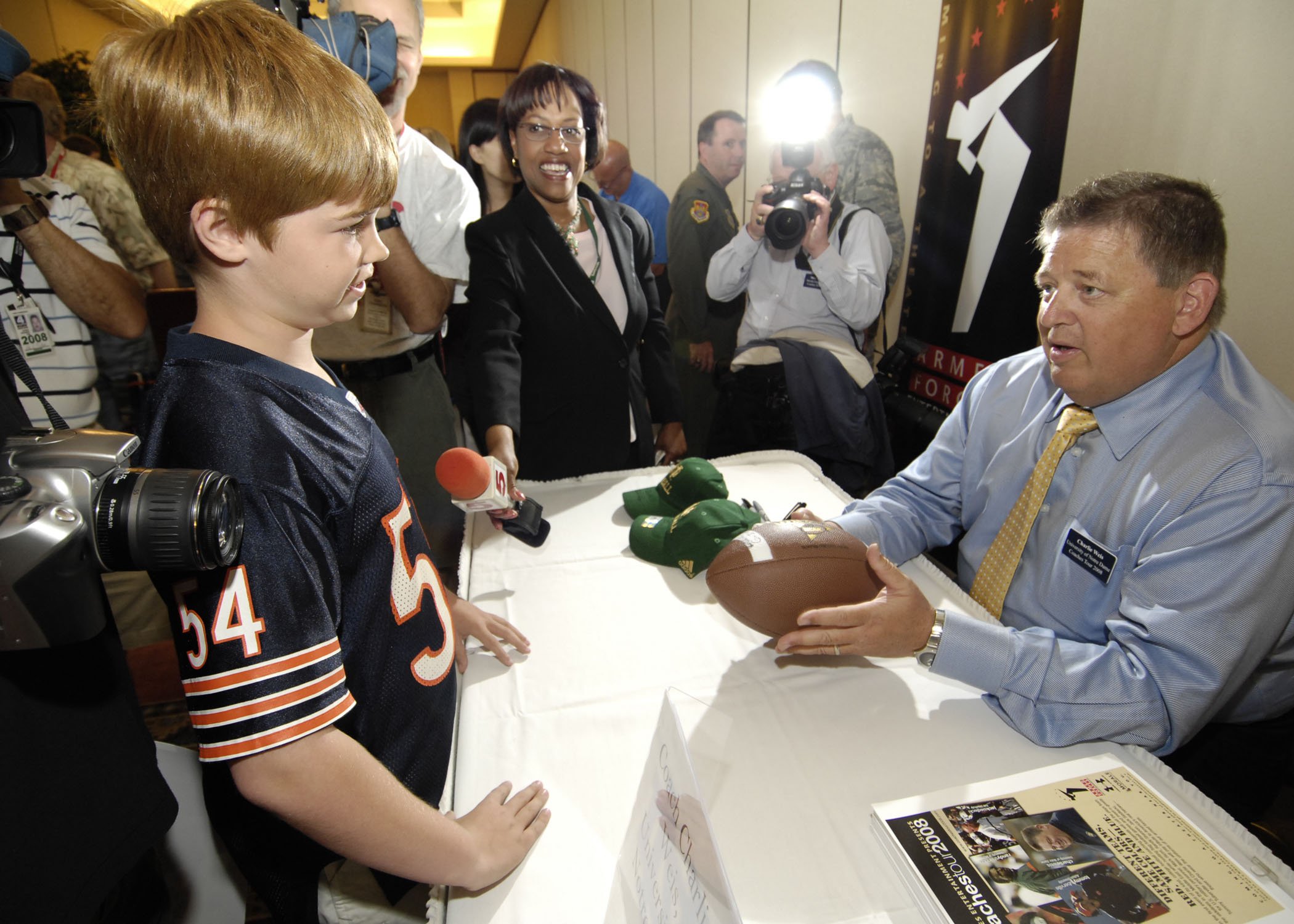
Charlie Weis signs a football for a young fan at Scott Air Force Base in Illinois.

Weis and his wife, Maura, have two children, Charles Joseph "Charlie" and Hannah Margaret. Charlie Jr. is the offensive coordinator at Louisiana State University (LSU). In 2003, Weis and his wife established the Hannah & Friends Foundation, dedicated to children affected by developmental disorders and named after his daughter, who is autistic. In the spring of 2004, the inaugural Hannah & Friends Celebrity Golf Classic was held to benefit the foundation.

Weis told YES Network commentators at the New York Yankees and Detroit Tigers MLB game on Friday, July 17, 2009, that his favorite baseball team is the Yankees. He was there to celebrate the announcement of the Notre Dame and Army football game to be played at the new Yankee Stadium in November 2010.

Weis was born in Trenton, New Jersey, and grew up in Middlesex, New Jersey, where he graduated from Middlesex High School. Weis was inducted to Middlesex High School Athletics Hall of Fame- Class of 2024 on May 4, 2024. Weis played High School Football as the center for the class of 1976.

=== Health issues ===
In 2002, Weis underwent gastric bypass surgery, after which he lost 90 lb (41 kg; 6.4 st) from his top weight of 350 lb (160 kg; 25 st). When asked why he underwent surgery, Weis stated he was afraid he would "drop dead" from obesity. Because of complications from the surgery, Weis spent two weeks in a coma, and nearly died. Weis later sued the doctors who performed the surgery for malpractice, but lost. A major reason cited for the jury's decision was that Weis ignored doctors' advice and pushed to have the operation done quickly, rather than going through a recommended six-week preoperative program.

During a game against Michigan on September 13, 2008, Notre Dame defensive end John Ryan accidentally collided with Weis on the sideline. Weis sustained tears to his anterior cruciate ligament and medial collateral ligament, for which he underwent surgery.

== Head coaching record ==
Year	Team	Overall	Conference	Standing	Bowl/playoffs	Coaches^{#}	AP^{°}
Notre Dame Fighting Irish (NCAA Division I-A/FBS independent) (2005–2009)
2005	Notre Dame	9–3			L Fiesta^{†}	11	9
2006	Notre Dame	10–3			L Sugar^{†}	20	17
2007	Notre Dame	3–9					
2008	Notre Dame	7–6			W Hawaii		
2009	Notre Dame	6–6					
Notre Dame:		35–27					
Kansas Jayhawks (Big 12 Conference) (2012–2014)
2012	Kansas	1–11	0–9	10th			
2013	Kansas	3–9	1–8	10th			
2014	Kansas	2–2 (Note: Weis was fired after the first four games of the 2014 season. Clint Bowen was appointed interim head coach for the final eight games of the season. Kansas finished the year with an overall record of 3–9 and a mark of 1–8 in conference play, placing ninth in the Big 12 Conference.)	0–1				
Kansas:		6–22	1–18				
Total:		41–49					
^{†}Indicates BCS bowl.; ^{#}Rankings from final Coaches Poll.; ^{°}Rankings from final AP Poll.

== Works ==
- Weis, Charlie & Carucci, Vic (2006), No Excuses: One Man's Incredible Rise Through the NFL to Head Coach of Notre Dame, New York: HarperLargePrint, ISBN 0-06-123307-2
