= Tom Zbikowski =

American football player and coach (born 1985)

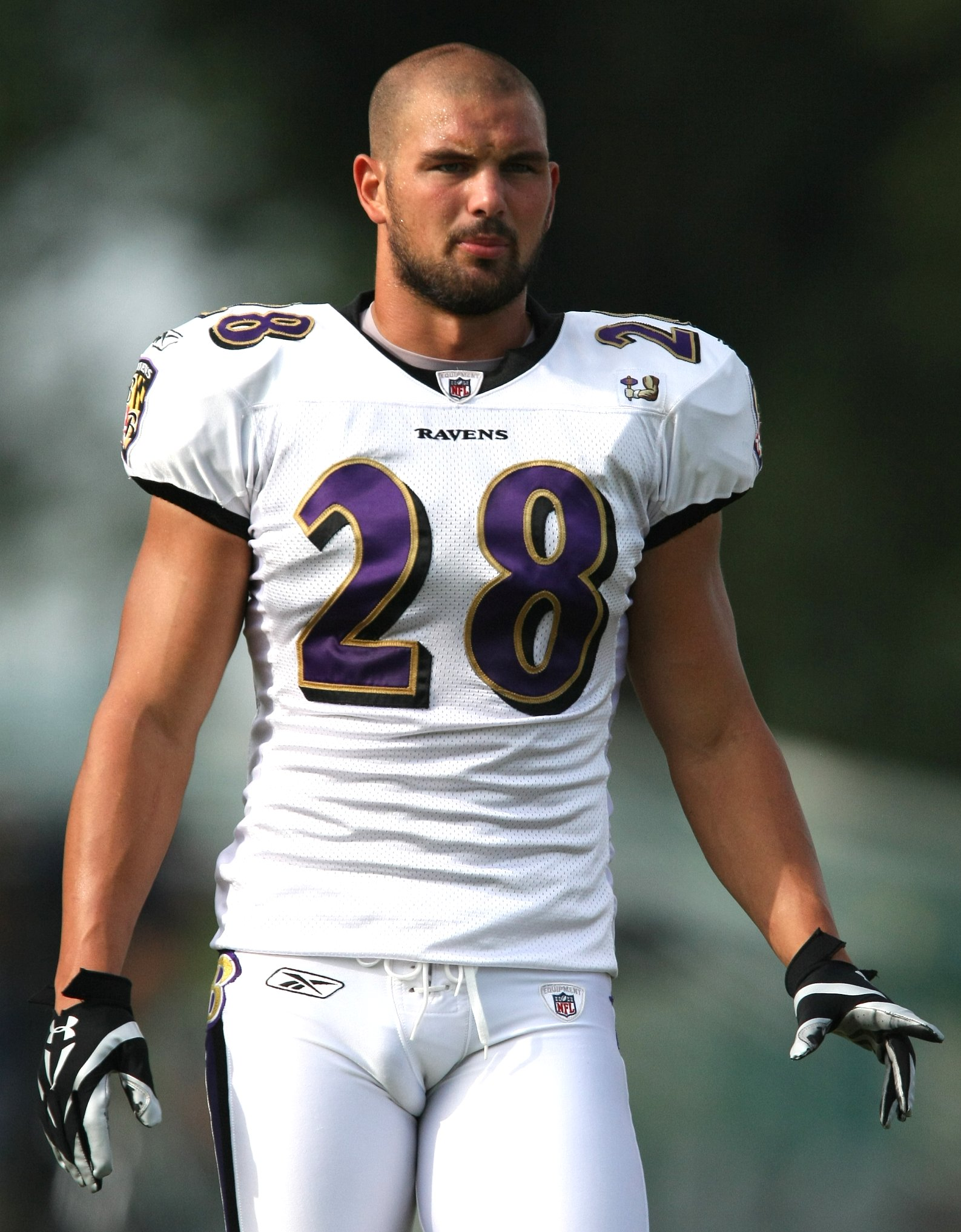
- Zbikowski with the Baltimore Ravens in 2009

Saint Patrick High School
- Title: Head coach

Personal information
- Born: May 22, 1985 (age 41); Park Ridge, Illinois, U.S.
- Listed height: 5 ft 11 in (1.80 m)
- Listed weight: 200 lb (91 kg)

Career information
- High school: Buffalo Grove (Buffalo Grove, Illinois)
- College: Notre Dame
- NFL draft: 2008: 3rd round, 86th overall pick

Career history

Playing
- Baltimore Ravens (2008–2011); Indianapolis Colts (2012); Chicago Bears (2013)*
- * Offseason or practice squad member only

Coaching
- Western Michigan (2022) Defensive quality control coach; Brown (2023–24) Safeties coach; Saint Patrick High School (2025–present) Head coach

Awards and highlights
- 2× Third-team All-American (2005, 2006)

Career NFL statistics
- Total tackles: 126
- Sacks: 2
- Pass deflections: 9
- Interceptions: 3
- Stats at Pro Football Reference

Thomas Michael Zbikowski (born May 22, 1985) is an American college football coach and former safety. He is the head coach for Saint Patrick High School In Chicago, Illinois, a position he has held since 2025. He played in the National Football League (NFL), as well as being a professional boxer and a firefighter. He was selected by the Baltimore Ravens in the third round (86th overall) of the 2008 NFL draft. He earned All-American honors playing college football for the University of Notre Dame from 2003 to 2007.

Zbikowski was also a member of the Indianapolis Colts and Chicago Bears.

== Early life ==
Thomas Michael Zbikowski was born on May 22, 1985, in Park Ridge, Illinois, the youngest of four children born to Edmund Richard Zbikowski and Susan Lois (née Schatz) Zbikowski. His siblings are Kristen and Edmund Joseph "E.J.". He is of Polish descent on his father's side of the family and of German descent on his mother's side of the family. He grew up in Arlington Heights, Illinois. He attended Greenbrier Elementary School and Thomas Middle School in Arlington Heights, Illinois and then high school at Buffalo Grove High School in Buffalo Grove, Illinois. He graduated from Buffalo Grove in 2003. He played youth football with the Buffalo Grove Bills and the Bensenville Bandits during elementary and middle school. At Buffalo Grove, he played quarterback where he set the school records in scoring (202 total points), and rushing (2357 yards, 7.4 average, 32 tds) before becoming a defensive back as well.

== College career ==
Zbikowski played college football at Notre Dame. He made his debut as a sophomore in 2004, appearing in all 12 games and finished fourth best on the team with 70 total tackles (37 solo, 33 assisted) and two forced fumbles. He was named Walter Camp Defensive Player of the Week on Sept. 19 following his performance at Michigan State as he had a team-high nine tackles, forced a fumble and returned it for a 75-yard TD and recorded his first career interception.

Zbikowski broke out as one of college football's best utility players during his junior season, excelling as a safety and a return man. Zbikowski accounted for four touchdowns (two interception returns and two punt returns) in 12 games played. He finished fourth on the team with 71 total tackles and led the defense with five interceptions while leading the Irish to the Fiesta Bowl. Following the seasons, Zbikowski earned Third-Team Associated Press All-American honors.

He served as 2006 team captain alongside Brady Quinn and Travis Thomas and was selected to the second-team All-American squad by the Walter Camp Football Foundation after helping the Irish earn a bid in the Sugar Bowl. Zbikowski was also named a third-team All-American by the Associated Press and was a semi-finalist for the Jim Thorpe Award, presented annually to the nation's best defensive back. He ended the year with 79 tackles, recovered a fumble for a touchdown against Penn State, and recorded his third career punt return touchdown with 52-yard return against North Carolina.

Zbikowski returned to Notre Dame for his fifth year in 2007, recording a career-high 80 total tackles with a pair of interceptions and fumble recoveries. He continued to shine as a return man, racking up 234 return yards on punts. He graduated in May with degrees in sociology and computer applications.

== Professional career ==
=== Baltimore Ravens ===
Zbikowski was selected with the 86th overall pick in the third round of the 2008 NFL draft by the Baltimore Ravens. He made the team and played four seasons for Baltimore as a defensive back and kick returner. He appeared in 56 games for the Ravens, including 14 starts as a safety. He made his professional debut on September 7 against the Cincinnati Bengals, posting his first career tackle on special teams during a 17–10 win. He had two interceptions in 2009, and helped as a returner. He declared free agency after the 2011 season.

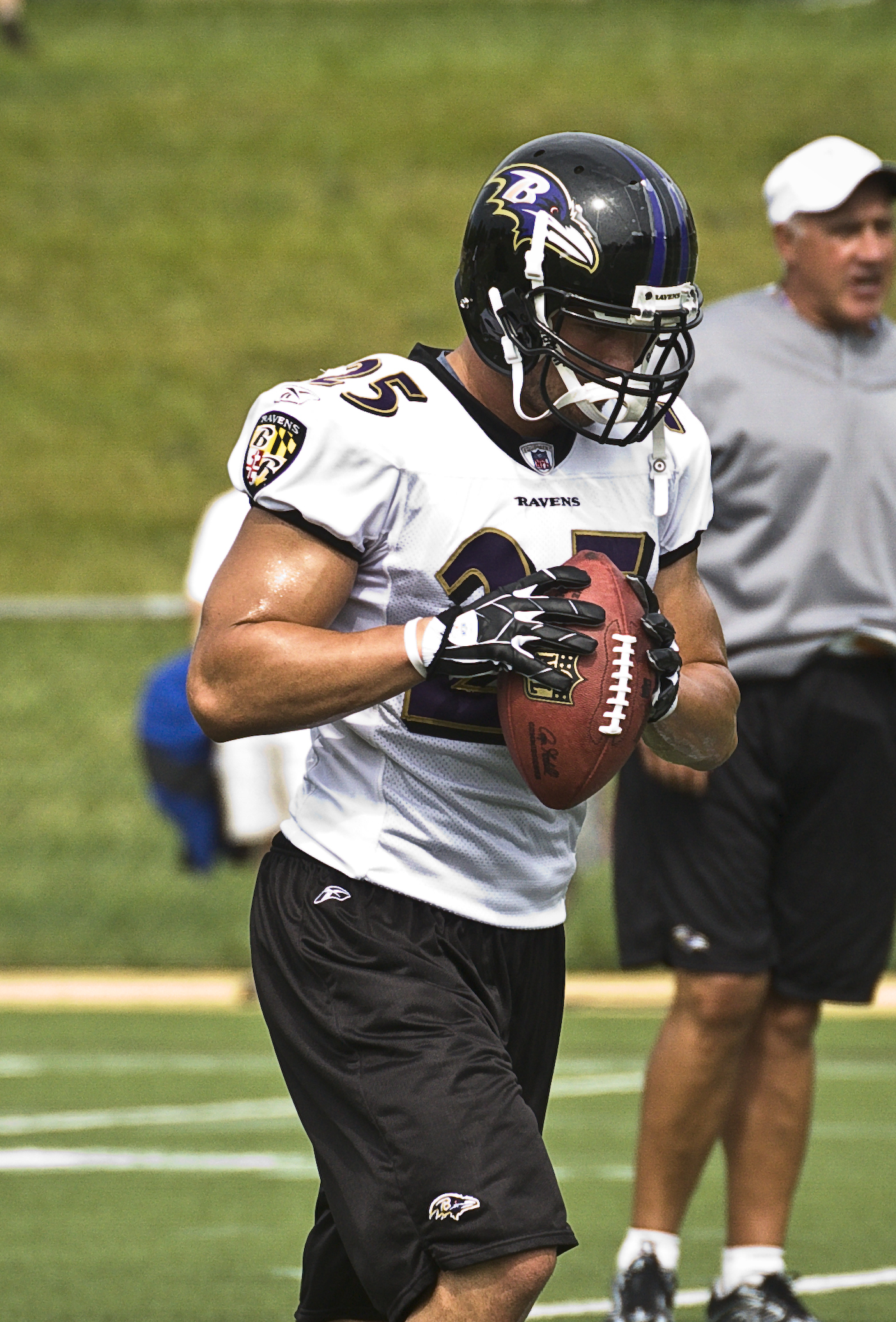
Zbikowski practicing with the Ravens in 2008.

=== Indianapolis Colts ===
Zbikowski signed with the Indianapolis Colts on March 16, 2012. He was the Colts' regular starting strong safety until he was injured during the 12th game of the season, missing the rest of the regular season. He did return for a Wild Card playoff game. The Colts lost that game 24–9 to Zbikowski's old team, the Baltimore Ravens. Indianapolis released him on March 15, 2013.

=== Chicago Bears ===
On March 23, 2013, Zbikowski was signed by the Chicago Bears to a one-year deal worth $715,000, but was released on August 25 during training camp.

=== Free agency and retirement ===
On September 10, 2013, Zbikowski was suspended by the National Football League for four games for violating the league's performance-enhancing drug policy. He later stated that the banned substance was a diuretic he took to lose weight. In November 2013, he told David Haugh of the Baltimore Sun: "I don't want that label of a guy who took a PED because as much as I'm a hustler, I don't like cheating, I never even thought about that. I don't take protein shakes. I drink coffee, green tea and eat food. That's what I've done my whole life."

The suspension proved to be a moot point because Zbikowski retired from the NFL. He explained, "Football got old to me…I enjoyed my first two years in the NFL because it was a challenge. I was playing with the best. But after a while you don't care whether you win or lose because you're still getting a paycheck. I enjoyed high school and college much more."

In 2015, Zbikowski completed fire academy training and joined the Chicago Fire Department. He is no longer a member of the Fire Department as of 2019.

== Coaching career ==
In 2022, was hired as a defensive quality control coach for Western Michigan.

On August 3, 2023, Zbikowski was announced as the safeties coach at Brown University.

Zbikowski was appointed as the head coach for the Saint Patrick High School football team, effective February 1, 2025.

== Boxing career ==
Zbikowski has sporadically pursued a career as a professional boxer since 2006, mostly in the cruiserweight division. He has won all eight of his official bouts, five by knockout, all against little-known opponents.

On June 10, 2006, while still in college, Zbikowski made his professional boxing debut at Madison Square Garden in New York City, beating his opponent, Robert Bell of Akron, Ohio, by TKO within 49.0 seconds of the first round. The fight was compliant with NCAA guidelines. Bell, who is an Ohio State fan, wore an Ohio State football jersey into the ring.

Zbikowski boxed a three-round exhibition fight against Ryan St. Germain on March 2, 2007, at the Century Center in South Bend, Indiana. After the 2008 NFL season he decided to put his boxing career on hold to focus on football.

On March 12, 2011, Zbikowski returned to the ring for the first time since 2007, taking on 1–2 35-year-old Richard Bryant in Las Vegas, amidst ongoing NFL labor contract discord. Zbikowski won by TKO after 1 minute 45 seconds in the first round of the scheduled four-round fight.

After that, he trained under the instruction of his new trainer Emanuel Steward, an inductee both of the International Boxing Hall of Fame and the World Boxing Hall of Fame, and won via a unanimous decision at the Boardwalk Hall in Atlantic City, New Jersey on March 26, 2011, to extend his winning streak to three in a row.

He extended his win streak to 4–0 in a first-round knock out against Blake Warner at the Winstar Casino in Thackerville, Okla. on April 23, 2011. After testing positive for a substance in marijuana, he was suspended. After taking a second test, his suspension was lifted. Bob Arum said, "I think that the commission did the right thing by lifting the suspension... The tests that were taken were very unreliable. Now Tommy has taken a proper test, and as a result, you know that he's clean. So they did the right thing."

Zbikowski returned to the ring again in 2016 and won all three of his fights that year. His last fight was on October 17, 2017, when he defeated a boxer named Martez Williamson who was ranked 639th in the world at the time, and whose won-lost record was 3–20 after the bout.

== Professional boxing record ==
8 Wins (5 knockouts), 0 Losses 0 Draws 0 No Contest
Res.	Record	Opponent	Type	Rd., Time	Date	Location	Notes
Win	8–0	(United States) Martez Williamson	TKO	2 (4)	2017-10-07	(United States) Camp Jordan Arena, Chattanooga, Tennessee	
Win	7–0	(United States) Raymond Gray	DQ	2 (4)	2016-06-17	(United States) The Belvedere, Elk Grove Village, Illinois	
Win	6–0	(United States) Albert Harkins	KO	1 (4), 0:35	2016-05-14	(United States) Horseshoe Casino, Hammond, Indiana	
Win	5–0	(United States) Keith Jackson	UD	4 (4)	2016-04-22	(United States) The Belvedere, Elk Grove Village, Illinois	
Win	4–0	(United States) Blake Warner	KO	1 (4), 2:20	2011-04-23	(United States) WinStar Casino, Thackerville, Oklahoma	
Win	3–0	(United States) Caleb Grummet	UD	4 (4)	2011-03-26	(United States) Boardwalk Hall, Atlantic City, New Jersey	
Win	2–0	(United States) Richard Bryant	TKO	1 (4), 1:45	2011-03-12	(United States) MGM Grand, Paradise, Nevada	
Win	1–0	(United States) Robert Bell	TKO	1 (4), 0:49	2006-06-10	(United States) Madison Square Garden, New York City, New York	
