= Victor Abiamiri =

American football player (born 1986)

No. 78, 95
- Position: Defensive end

Personal information
- Born: January 14, 1986 (age 40); Baltimore, Maryland, U.S.
- Listed height: 6 ft 4 in (1.93 m)
- Listed weight: 267 lb (121 kg)

Career information
- High school: Gilman School (Baltimore)
- College: Notre Dame
- NFL draft: 2007: 2nd round, 57th overall pick

Career history
- Philadelphia Eagles (2007–2011)

Career NFL statistics
- Total tackles: 30
- Sacks: 4
- Forced fumbles: 2
- Fumble recoveries: 1
- Defensive touchdowns: 1
- Stats at Pro Football Reference

Victor Ikechukwu Abiamiri (born January 14, 1986) is an American former professional football player who was a defensive end for the Philadelphia Eagles of the National Football League (NFL). He played college football for the Notre Dame Fighting Irish and was selected by the Eagles in the second round of the 2007 NFL draft. He is of Nigerian descent.

== Early life ==
Abiamiri grew up in Randallstown, Maryland, and attended high school at the Gilman School where he earned First-team USA Today All-American honors as a defensive lineman. He led the team in 2002 with 52 tackles, 17 stops for losses, 12 sacks, three forced fumbles and one interception as a defensive end, while helping the Greyhounds to a 10-0 record, #15 national ranking from USA Today and the Maryland Interscholastic Athletic Association A Conference title. Coming out of high school, he was rated in ESPN's list of the nation's top 100 players and first on The Sporting News Hot 100. He was named Defensive Player of the Year on the Baltimore Sun's All-Baltimore City/County team and won All-Metro honors as a junior with 16 sacks. During his high school career, Abiamiri totaled 45 sacks and 63 stops behind the line of scrimmage. Victor has two older brothers who played for the University of Maryland: Rob Abiamiri—who had a brief stint on the Baltimore Ravens practice squad, and Paschal Abiamiri.

== College career ==
Abiamiri played college football at the University of Notre Dame. In 49 games at Notre Dame, Abiamiri started 30 times. He registered 128 tackles (84 solos) with 20.5 sacks and 40 stops for losses. He was credited with 21 quarterback pressures, three forced fumbles and two pass deflections.

As a freshman, Abiamiri started 5 of 12 games, recording 22 tackles and one sack. He was named a Rivals.com honorable mention Freshman All-American.

As a sophomore, he played in every game and had 15 tackles and two sacks.

As a junior in 2005, Abiamiri started all 12 games at defensive end. He was Notre Dame's Lineman of the Year as voted by the Moose Krause Chapter of the National Football Foundation. He was also one of ten players selected to the team's leadership committee by a vote of his teammates. He finished the season with 48 tackles, 15 tackles for loss, eight sacks and one forced fumble.

As a senior, he made 43 tackles, 15 tackle of them for loss, and had a career high 10.5 sacks and was honorable mention All-American and All-Major Independent Defensive Player of the Year by The NFL Draft Report. He was named Notre Dame's Lineman of the Year for the second straight season.

== Professional career ==
Pre-draft measurables
Height	Weight	40-yard dash	10-yard split	20-yard split	Bench press
6 ft 4 1/4 in (1.94 m)	267 lb (121 kg)	4.85 s	1.67 s	2.77 s	25 reps
All values from NFL Combine.

Abiamiri was drafted by the Philadelphia Eagles in the second round of the 2007 NFL draft with the 57th overall pick. On July 22, 2007, he signed a four-year contract with the Eagles. In his rookie season he played six games with one start and totaled five tackles.

In the 2009 season, Abiamiri was named the starter at left defensive end, winning the job over the previous season's starter, Juqua Parker. Abiamiri suffered a hyperextended knee on October 18 in a game against the Oakland Raiders. He missed the following three games, and returned on November 15 in a game against the San Diego Chargers. He underwent microfracture surgery on his left knee on February 9, 2010. He was placed on the Active/Physically Unable to Perform list at the beginning of training camp on July 26. He was placed on the reserve/PUP list on August 31.

Abiamiri suffered an Achilles tendon rupture during training camp practice on August 2, 2011, and was placed on injured reserve on August 4.
