= Notre Dame Fighting Irish football =

American athletic football program of the University of Notre Dame

2026 Notre Dame Fighting Irish football team
- First season: 1887; 139 years ago
- Athletic director: Pete Bevacqua
- General manager: Mike Martin
- Head coach: Marcus Freeman; 5th season, 48–12 (.800)
- Location: Notre Dame, Indiana
- Stadium: Notre Dame Stadium (capacity: 77,622)
- NCAA division: Division I FBS
- Conference: Independent
- Colors: Blue and gold
- All-time record: 974–341–42 (.733)
- CFP record: 3–3 (.500)
- Bowl record: 22–21 (.512)

National championships
- Claimed: 1924, 1929, 1930, 1943, 1946, 1947, 1949, 1966, 1973, 1977, 1988
- Unclaimed: 1919, 1920, 1927, 1938, 1953, 1964, 1967, 1970, 1989, 1993, 2012

National finalist
- Poll era: 1973, 1977, 1988
- BCS: 2012
- CFP: 2024

College Football Playoff appearances
- 2018, 2020, 2024
- Heisman winners: Angelo Bertelli – 1943; Johnny Lujack – 1947; Leon Hart – 1949; Johnny Lattner – 1953; Paul Hornung – 1956; John Huarte – 1964; Tim Brown – 1987
- Consensus All-Americans: 113
- Rivalries: Army (rivalry); Boston College (rivalry); Michigan (rivalry); Michigan State (rivalry); Navy (rivalry); Northwestern (rivalry); Pittsburgh (rivalry); Purdue (rivalry); Stanford (rivalry); USC (rivalry); Miami (rivalry)

Uniforms
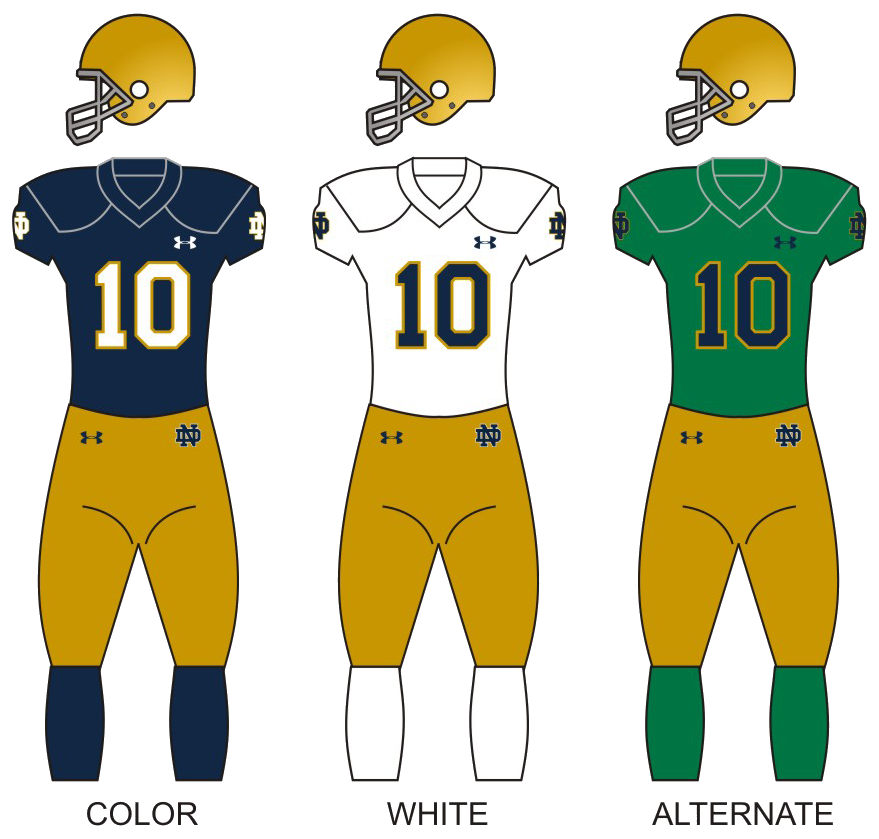
- Fight song: Notre Dame Victory March
- Mascot: Notre Dame Leprechaun
- Marching band: Band of the Fighting Irish
- Outfitter: Under Armour
- Website: FightingIrish.com

The Notre Dame Fighting Irish football team represents the University of Notre Dame in American football. It plays home games at the 77,622-capacity Notre Dame Stadium, located at Notre Dame University, in South Bend, Indiana. Notre Dame is one of two schools that compete as an independent at the National Collegiate Athletic Association (NCAA) Football Bowl Subdivision (FBS) level. (Note: Notre Dame plays five games a year against opponents from the Atlantic Coast Conference (ACC), of which it is a member in all other sports except ice hockey.)

The Fighting Irish are one of college football's most prestigious and successful programs. It has won 22 national championships since its establishment in 1887, though the school only officially claims 11, including 8 from the major wire-services (AP Poll and/or Coaches' Poll). Seven Notre Dame players have won the Heisman Trophy. Notre Dame has 972 official victories, with 21 having been vacated by the NCAA in 2016 for self-reported academic misconduct. The school recognizes 993 total wins in program history. Notre Dame has had 22 undefeated seasons including 12 perfect seasons, and their home games have been televised by NBC since 1991.

The Fighting Irish have played in blue jerseys with gold helmets and highlights for much of their history. Key team symbols include their fight song, the "Notre Dame Victory March", and the Notre Dame Leprechaun mascot. Their most prominent rivalry is with the USC Trojans; it arose from frequent competition for national championships and is one of the best-known in college football.

== History ==
=== Early history (1887–1917) ===
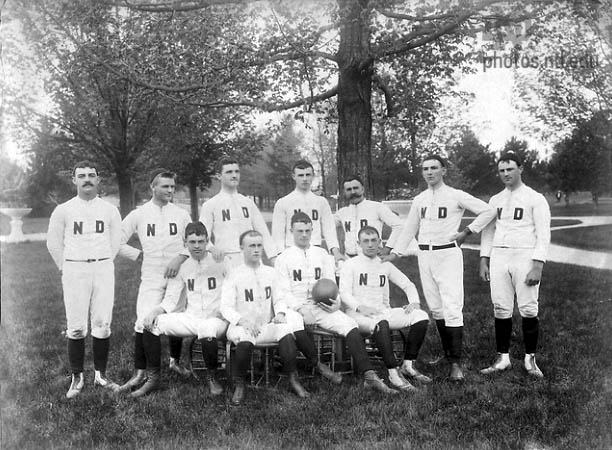
The first football team fielded by the University in 1887

Football did not have an auspicious beginning at the University of Notre Dame. In their inaugural game on November 23, 1887, the Irish lost to Michigan by a score of 8–0. Their first win came in the final game of the 1888 season when the Irish defeated Harvard Prep School of Chicago by a score of 20–0. At the end of the 1888 season, they had a record of 1–3 with all three losses being at the hands of Michigan. Between 1887 and 1899, Notre Dame compiled a record of 31 wins, 15 losses, and 4 ties against a diverse variety of opponents ranging from local high school teams to other universities. In 1894, James L. Morrison was hired as Notre Dame's first head football coach. Notre Dame took a significant step toward respectability, prominence, and stability when they hired Morrison. He wrote an acquaintance after his first day on the job: "I arrived here [Notre Dame] this morning and found about as green a set of football players that ever donned a uniform... They want to smoke, and when I told them that they would have to run and get up some wind, they thought I was rubbing it in on them. "One big, strong cuss remarked that it was too much like work. Well, maybe you think I didn't give him hell! I bet you a hundred no one ever makes a remark like that again."

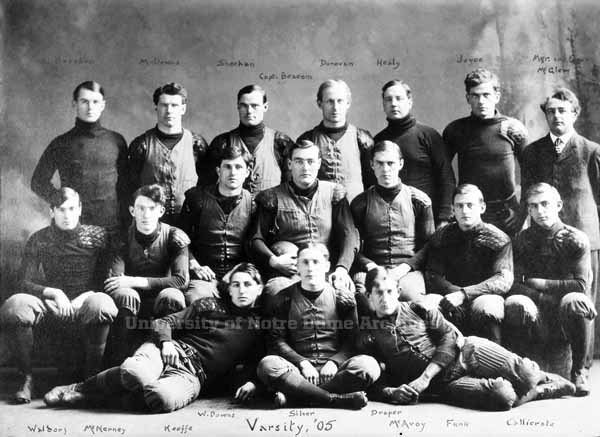
Notre Dame team of 1905

In 1908, the win over Franklin saw end Fay Wood catch the first touchdown pass in Notre Dame history. Notre Dame continued its success near the turn of the century and achieved their first victory over Michigan in 1909 by the score of 11–3, after which Michigan refused to play Notre Dame again for 33 years. By the end of the 1912 season the university's team had amassed a record of 108 wins, 31 losses, and 13 ties. Jesse Harper became head coach in 1913, coaching for five years until retiring in 1917. During his tenure, the Irish began playing only intercollegiate games and posted a record of 34 wins, 5 losses, and one tie. This period would also mark the beginning of the rivalry with Army and the continuation of rivalry with Michigan State. In an effort to gain respect for a regionally successful but small-time Midwestern football program, Harper scheduled games in his first season with national powerhouses Texas, Penn State, and Army. That year, Notre Dame burst into the national consciousness and helped to transform the collegiate game in a single contest.

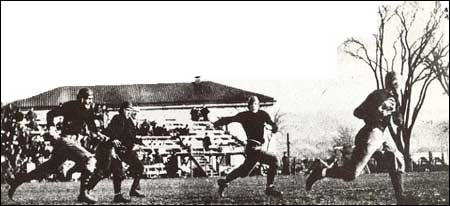
Knute Rockne running for a touchdown against Army after receiving a forward pass, November 1, 1913

On November 1, 1913, the Notre Dame squad stunned Army's Black Knights of the Hudson 35–13 in a game played at West Point. Led by quarterback Gus Dorais and end Knute Rockne, the Notre Dame team attacked the Cadets with an offense that featured both the expected powerful running game but also long and accurate downfield forward passes from Dorais to Rockne. This game has been miscredited as the invention of the forward pass. Prior to this contest, receivers would come to a full stop and wait on the ball to come to them, but in this contest, Dorais threw to Rockne in stride, changing the forward pass from a seldom-used play into the dominant ball-moving strategy that it is today.

=== Knute Rockne era (1918–1930) ===
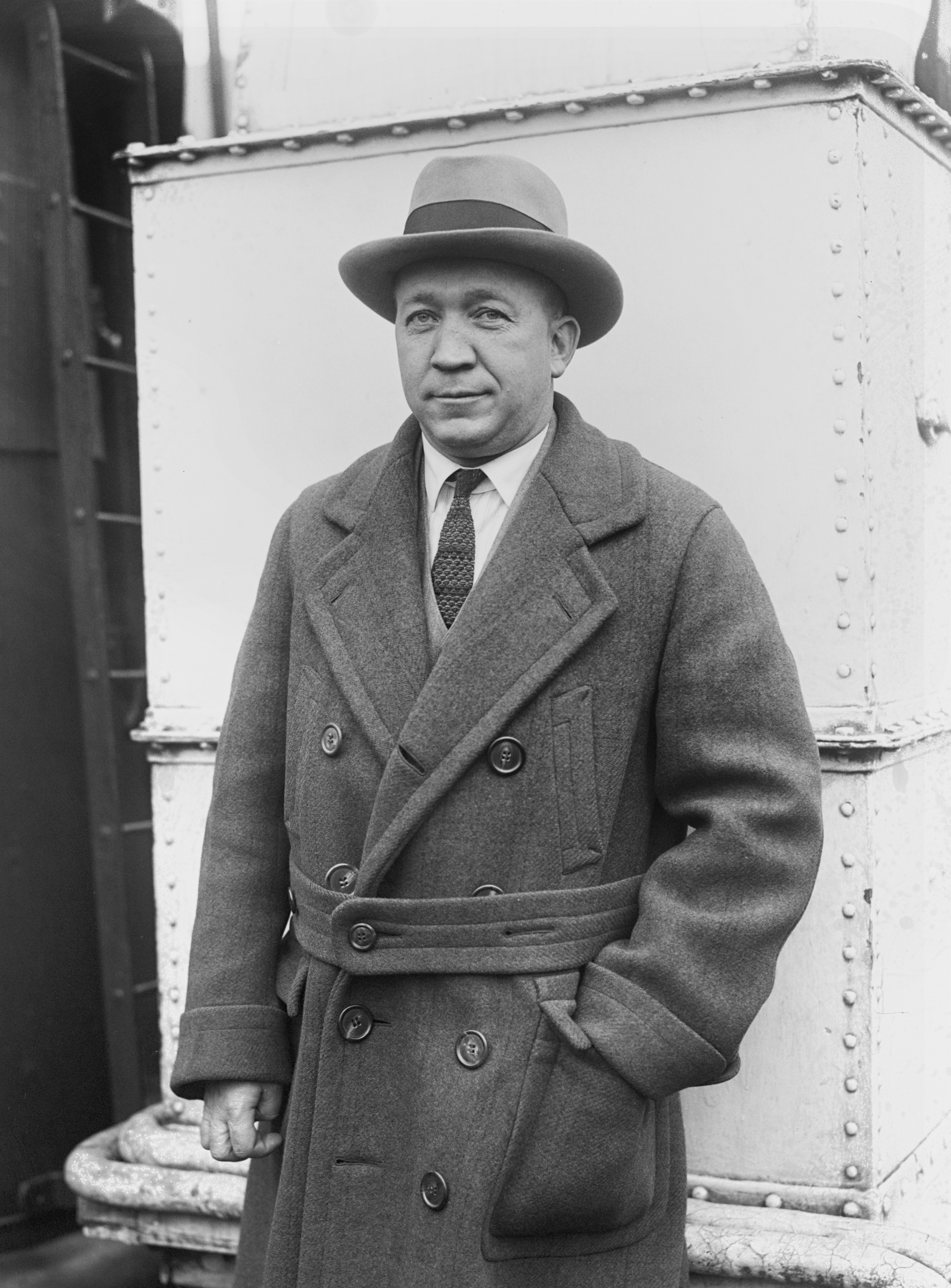
Coach Knute Rockne

Irish assistant Knute Rockne became head coach in 1918. During his 13 years, the Irish won three national championships, had five undefeated seasons, won the Rose Bowl in 1925, and produced players such as George Gipp and the "Four Horsemen". Rockne's offenses employed the Notre Dame Box and his defenses ran a 7–2–2 scheme.

Rockne took over in the war-torn season of 1918 He made his coaching debut on September 28, 1918, against Case Tech in Cleveland, Ohio, and earned a 26–6 victory. Leonard Bahan, George Gipp, and Curly Lambeau were in the backfield. With Gipp, Rockne had an ideal handler of the forward pass. The Irish posted a 3–1–2 record for the season, losing only to the Michigan Agricultural Aggies. The 1919 team had Rockne handle the line and Gus Dorais handle the backfield. The Irish went undefeated and were one of four teams to be selected for the national championship, although Notre Dame does not claim it.

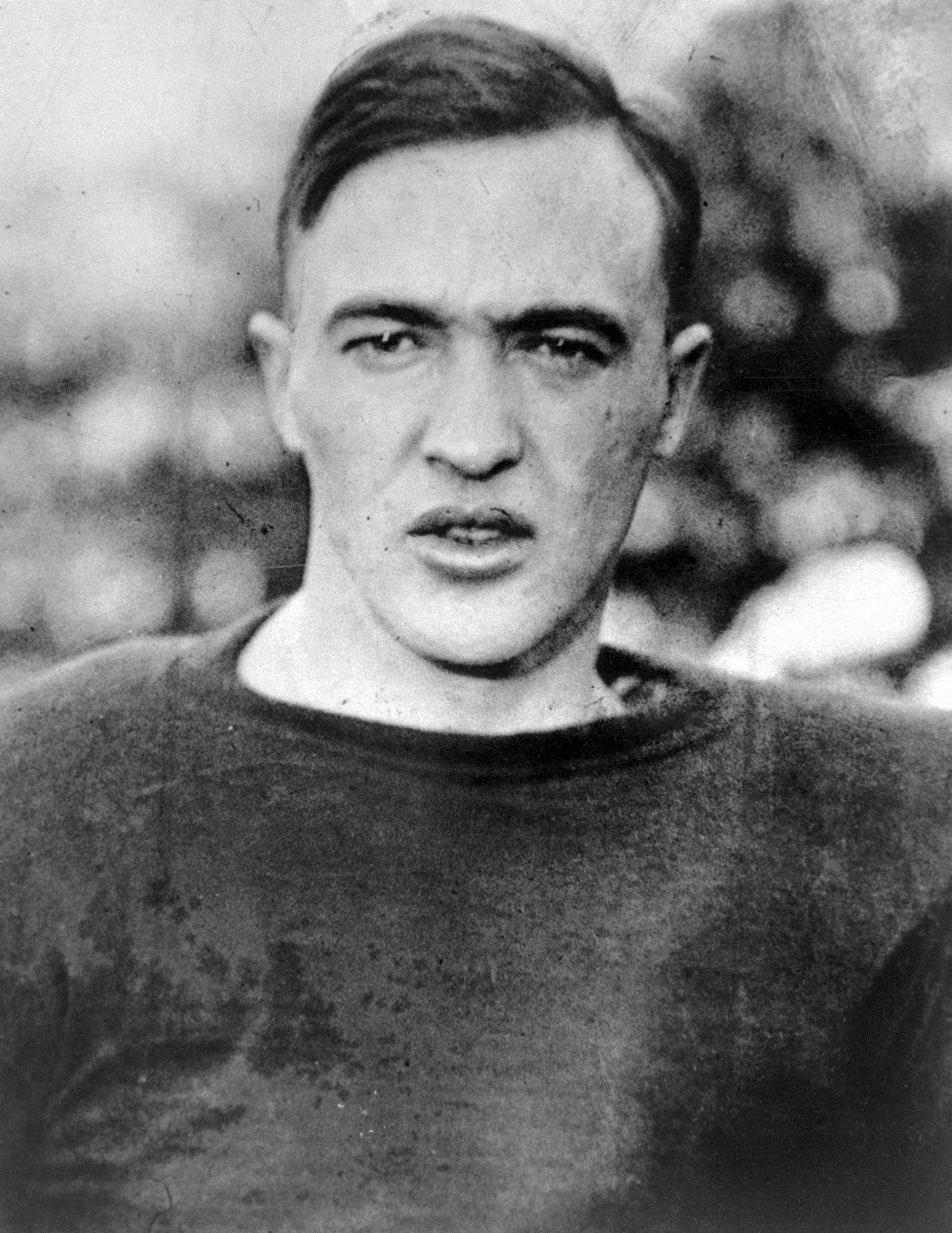
George Gipp, "The Gipper"

Gipp died at age 25 on December 14, 1920, just two weeks after Walter Camp elected him as Notre Dame's first All-American. Gipp likely contracted strep throat and pneumonia while giving punting lessons after his final game on November 20 against Northwestern. Since antibiotics were not available in the 1920s, treatment options for such infections were limited and they could be fatal even to young, healthy individuals. Rockne was speaking to Gipp on his hospital bed when he was purported to have delivered the famous "Win one for the Gipper" line.

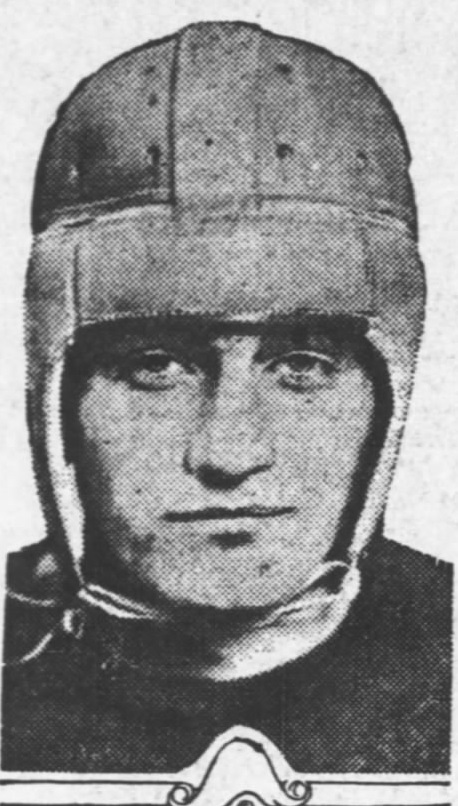
Roger Kiley

John Mohardt led the 1921 Notre Dame team to a 10–1 record with 781 rushing yards, 995 passing yards, 12 rushing touchdowns, and nine passing touchdowns. Grantland Rice wrote that "Mohardt could throw the ball to within a foot or two of any given space" and noted that the 1921 Notre Dame team "was the first team we know of to build its attack around a forward passing game, rather than use a forward passing game as a mere aid to the running game." Mohardt had both Eddie Anderson and Roger Kiley at end to receive his passes.

The national champion 1924 team included the "Four Horsemen" backfield of Harry Stuhldreher, Don Miller, Jim Crowley, and Elmer Layden. The line was known as the "Seven Mules". The Irish capped an undefeated, 10–0 season with a victory over Stanford in the Rose Bowl. The 1926 team beat Army and was led by Christie Flanagan, but was undone by a loss to Carnegie Tech in the penultimate game of the season. In this game, Rockne made what an Associated Press writer called "one of the greatest coaching blunders in history" by traveling to Chicago for the Army–Navy Game to "write newspaper articles about it, as well as select an All-America football team." Carnegie Tech used the coach's absence as motivation for a 19–0 win; the upset likely cost the Irish a chance for a national title.

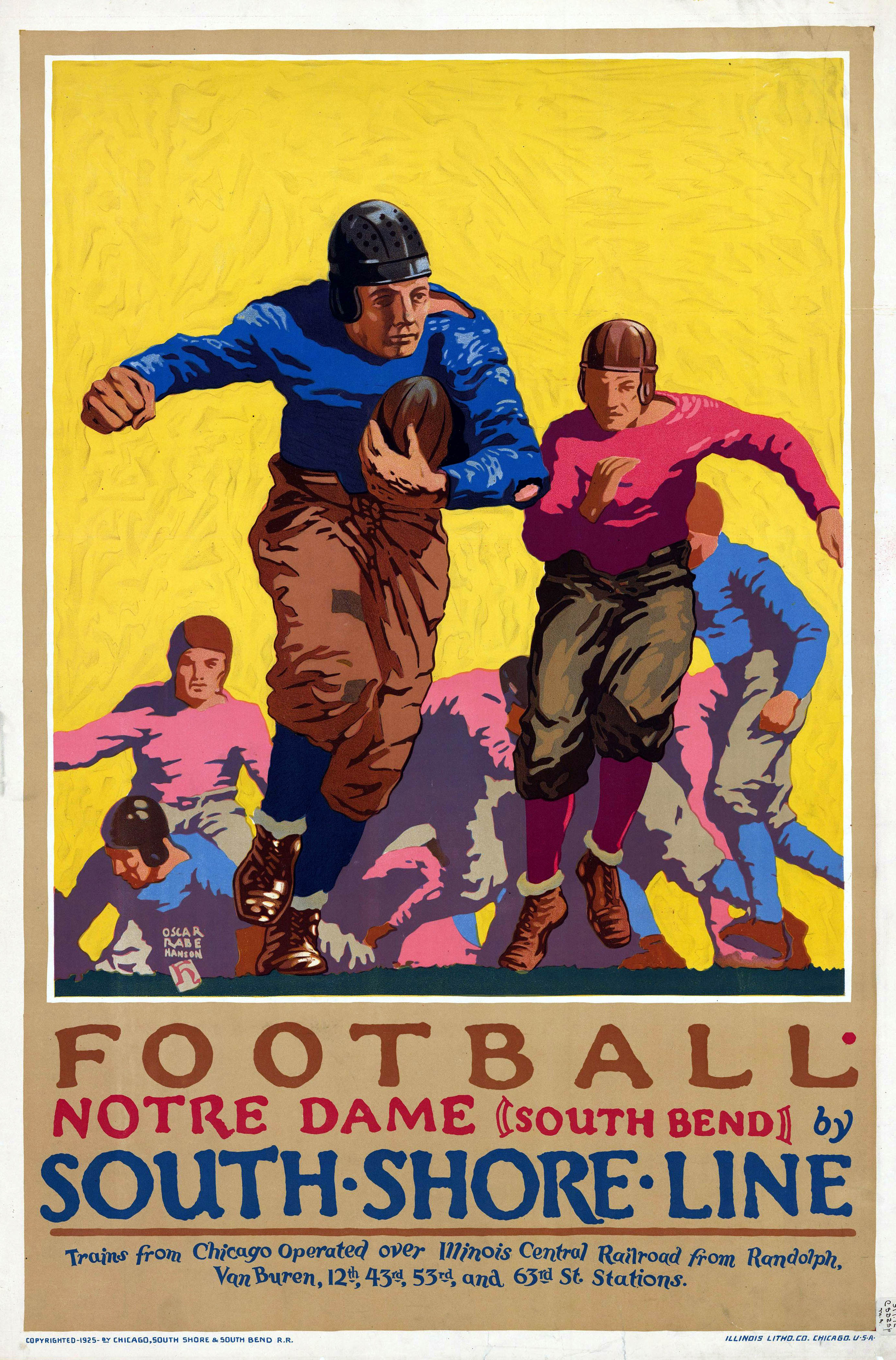
A 1926 South Shore Line broadside advertising entertainment such as Notre Dame football games, to encourage use of the railroad between Chicago and South Bend.

The 1928 team lost to national champion Georgia Tech. "I sat at Grant Field and saw a magnificent Notre Dame team suddenly recoil before the furious pounding of one man–Peter Pund," said Rockne. "Nobody could stop him. I counted 20 scoring plays that this man ruined." Among the events that occurred during Rockne's tenure none may be more famous than the Rockne's "Win one for the Gipper" speech. Army came into the 1928 matchup undefeated and was the clear favorite. Notre Dame, on the other hand, was having their worst season under Rockne's leadership and entered the game with a 4–2 record. At the end of the half Army was leading and looked to be in command of the game. Rockne entered the locker room and gave his account of Gipp's final words: "I've got to go, Rock. It's all right. I'm not afraid. Some time, Rock, when the team is up against it, when things are going wrong and the breaks are beating the boys, tell them to go in there with all they've got and win just one for the Gipper. I don't know where I'll be then, Rock. But I'll know about it, and I'll be happy." The speech inspired the team and they went on to upset Army and win the game 12–6.

The 1929 and 1930 teams both went undefeated, winning national championships, and the 1930 team was led by the likes of Frank Carideo, Joe Savoldi, Marchy Schwartz and Marty Brill. It featured the first and only example of all four members of a backfield being named to an All-American team during the same season. The 1929 team played all of its games on the road while the new Notre Dame Stadium was being built. In 1930, "Jumping Joe" Savoldi scored the first Notre Dame touchdown in the new stadium on a 98-yard kickoff return. Savoldi is also known as "the first hero in the lore of Notre Dame's Stadium" based on scoring three touchdowns in the official stadium dedication game against Navy the following week. Rockne coached his last game on December 14, 1930, when he led a group of Notre Dame all-stars against the New York Giants in New York City. The game raised funds for the Mayor's Relief Committee for the unemployed and needy of the city. 50,000 fans turned out to see the reunited "Four Horsemen" along with players from Rockne's other championship teams take the field against the pros.

On March 31, 1931, Rockne died at age 43 in the crash of a Transcontinental & Western Air airliner in Kansas; he was on his way to help in the production of the film The Spirit of Notre Dame. The crash site is located in a remote expanse of Kansas known as the Flint Hills and now features a Rockne Memorial. As Notre Dame's head coach from 1918 to 1930, Rockne posted what has remained for decades the all-time highest winning percentage (.881) for a football coach in the NCAA's flagship FBS division. During his 13-year tenure as head coach of the Fighting Irish, Rockne collected 105 victories, 12 losses, 5 ties and 3 national championships. Rockne also coached Notre Dame to 5 undefeated and untied seasons.

=== Heartley Anderson era (1931–1933) ===
Through game broadcasts during the Golden Age of Radio, Notre Dame football gained a nationwide following of "subway alumni", Catholics who became fans whether or not they attended the university. Former Saint Louis head coach Heartley "Hunk" Anderson was promoted from assistant coach and took the helm of the Irish after Knute Rockne's death, leading them to a record of 16 wins, nine losses, and two ties. Anderson was a former Irish player under Rockne and was serving as an assistant coach at the time of Rockne's death. Notre Dame finished 6–2–1 in 1931. The Irish lost a heartbreaker by a score of 16–14 to USC on November 21 that snapped the program's 26-game unbeaten streak. 1933 was a tough year for the Irish as they finished with a 3–5–2 record, the first losing season for the program since 1888. ND suffered a four-game losing streak, failing to score a point in all four losses to Carnegie Tech, Pittsburgh, Navy, and Purdue. Anderson resigned as Irish head coach after the 1933 season to accept the position of head football coach at NC State.

=== Elmer Layden era (1934–1940) ===
Layden (second from left) was a member of Knute Rockne's legendary "Four Horsemen" backfield of 1924.

Anderson was replaced by Elmer Layden, who was one of Rockne's "Four Horsemen" of 1924. After graduating, Layden played professional football for one year and then began a coaching career.

Layden's 1935 squad posted one of the greatest wins in school history by rallying to defeat Ohio State by a score of 18–13 in a game billed as the "Game of the Century". His 1938 team finished 8–1, losing only to USC in the season finale. This loss cost them a possible consensus national championship, but the team was named national champion by the Dickinson System.

Like Rockne before him, Layden was a goodwill ambassador for Notre Dame during his time as head coach. He was able to schedule a home-and-home series with Michigan after meeting with Fielding H. Yost, healing a rift between the two schools. The two teams had not met since 1909, when, after eight straight losses to the Wolverines, the Irish posted their first win. They were scheduled to meet again in 1910, but Michigan canceled the game and refused to play the Irish again. By the time they met again in 1943, Layden had left Notre Dame and Frank Leahy had taken his place.

The Irish posted a record of 47 wins, 13 losses, and three ties in seven years under Layden, the most successful record of a Notre Dame coach not to win a national championship. He left Notre Dame after the 1940 season to become Commissioner of the National Football League.

=== Frank Leahy era (1941–1953) ===
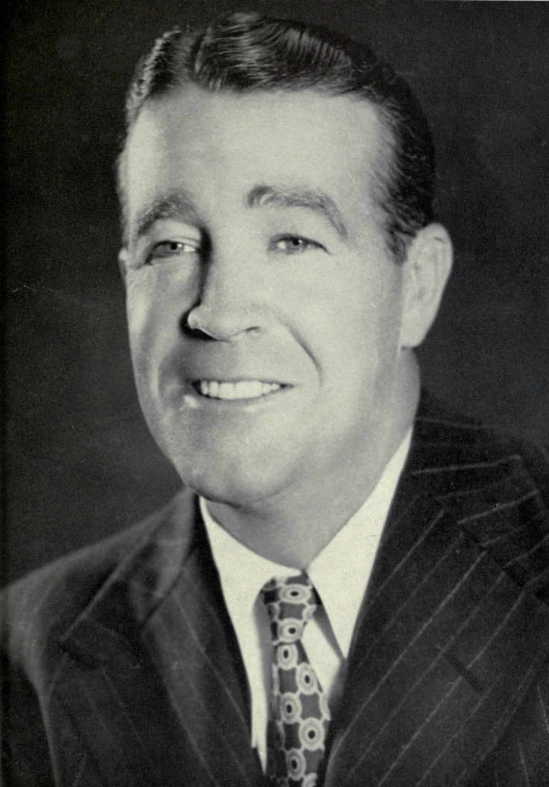
Frank Leahy

Boston College head coach Frank Leahy was hired by Notre Dame to take over for Layden in 1941 and was another former Irish player who played during the Rockne era. After graduating from Notre Dame, Leahy held several coaching positions, including line coach of the Seven Blocks of Granite of Fordham University that helped that team win all but two of their games between 1935 and 1937. He then coached the Boston College Eagles to a win in the 1941 Sugar Bowl and a share of the national championship. His move to Notre Dame began a new period of gridiron success for the Irish and ensured Leahy's place among the winningest coaches in the history of college football.

Leahy coached the team for 11 seasons from 1941 to 1943 and 1946 to 1953. After finishing in the AP top 10 each of his first two seasons, Leahy's 1943 team went 9–1 and captured Notre Dame's fourth national championship and first since the advent of the AP Poll. Quarterback Angelo Bertelli became Notre Dame's first Heisman Trophy winner. From 1944 to 1945, Leahy served in the US Navy during World War II and was honorably discharged as a captain. Edward McKeever, Leahy's assistant coach, became interim head coach when Leahy left for the Navy. During 1944, his one year at the helm, the Irish managed 8 wins and 2 losses. McKeever left Notre Dame in 1945 to take over as head coach of Cornell. For the 1945 season, he was replaced by Hugh Devore, who led the Irish to a 7–2–1 record.

Upon Leahy's return in 1946 and due to his status as a veteran himself, the Irish heavily recruited returning veterans who were often much older than incoming freshmen. Largely thanks to this influx of talent, Notre Dame went four consecutive seasons after World War II without losing a game, winning the 1946, 1947, and 1949 national championships in the process. The 1946 game against Army, ending in a 0–0 tie, pitted two of the greatest teams of all time against each other and included three consecutive Heisman Trophy winners (Army's Doc Blanchard and Glenn Davis and Notre Dame's Johnny Lujack, who quarterbacked the 1946 and 1947 Irish). The 1948 team missed out on a national championship due only to a 14–14 tie at USC in the final game of the season. In 1949, Notre Dame went unbeaten and untied for the second time in three seasons behind Heisman Trophy-winning end Leon Hart, who would later be selected first overall in the 1950 NFL draft. A fifth national championship was lost because of a 1953 tie against Iowa in a game that featured 1953 Heisman Trophy winner Johnny Lattner that caused a minor scandal at the time when it appeared that some Irish players had faked injuries to stop the clock, leading some to nickname those players the "Fainting Irish".

Leahy retired in 1954 reportedly due to health issues. Perhaps the best example of this occurred during the Georgia Tech game in 1953. Leahy fell ill during the game, which led to him collapsing during halftime. The situation was so dire that a priest was called in to give Leahy Catholic last rites. However, Leahy recovered, and the consequent diagnosis was that he was suffering from nervous tension and pancreatitis.

Leahy has the second highest winning percentage (.864) of any college coach in history. He led the Irish to a record of 87 wins, 11 losses, and nine ties including 39 consecutive games without a loss (37–0–2), four national championships, and six undefeated seasons.

=== Terry Brennan era (1954–1958) ===
The departure of Frank Leahy ushered in a downward slope in Notre Dame's performance. 25-year old assistant coach Terry Brennan was hired as Frank Leahy's successor as the Notre Dame head coach in 1954 and would stay until 1958. Brennan was a former player under Leahy. Before joining the Irish, he had coached the Mount Carmel High School team in Chicago. His first two seasons the Irish were ranked fourth and ninth respectively in the AP poll, with a loss to Purdue the only blemish on the 1954 team's schedule. It was the 1956 season that began to darken Brennan's reputation, for it became one of the most dismal in the team's history and saw them finish the season with a mere two wins, including losses to Michigan State, Oklahoma, and Iowa. One bright spot in the 1956 season was the awarding of the Heisman Trophy to Paul Hornung, who would go on to a legendary NFL career with the Green Bay Packers. Hornung is the only Heisman winner to win the award while playing for a team that had a losing record. The Irish would recover the following season, posting a record of 7–3 and including in their wins a stunning upset of Oklahoma, in Norman, Oklahoma, that ended the Sooners' still-standing record of 47 consecutive wins. In Brennan's final season, though, the Irish finished 6–4, leading to Brennan's firing in mid-December. Brennan's tenure can only be properly framed with the understanding that in a time of zero scholarship limitations in college football, Notre Dame's administration inexplicably began a process of de-emphasizing football, severely cutting scholarships and hindering Brennan from building a roster of any meaningful depth. He departed with a total of 32 wins and 18 losses.

=== Joe Kuharich era (1959–1963) ===
Former San Francisco, Chicago Cardinals and Washington Redskins head coach Joe Kuharich took the head coaching position at Notre Dame in 1959, realizing a longtime ambition to return to his alma mater. He had earlier been courted by Notre Dame after the 1956 season, after the Irish finished 2–8, but before he had a chance to accept an offer, Terry Brennan was given a reprieve. Kuharich brought a professional touch to Irish football, putting shamrocks on the players' helmets and shoulder stripes on their jerseys. However, his tenure became one of the worst stretches in program history, including a school-record eight-game losing streak in 1960, a year in which the Irish finished 2–8. The consensus opinion was that Kuharich never made the adjustment from pro football to college football, attempting to use complicated pro coaching techniques with collegiate players, and never adapted to the limited substitution rules in effect at the time, having big, immobile linemen playing both ways in an era where smaller, quicker players were preferred. He often said, "You win some and you lose some", and seemed perfectly content finishing 5–5 every year. This did not sit well with the Irish faithful, who expected Notre Dame to beat everybody. When the pressure of winning became too much to bear, Kuharich resigned in the spring of 1963 and assumed the post of supervisor of NFL officials. Because it was so late in the spring, the freshman team's coach Hugh Devore was named head coach for the 1963 season while the search for a permanent replacement was being conducted.

Kuharich compiled a 17–23 record over four non-winning seasons and remains to this day the only coach ever to have an overall losing record at Notre Dame. Despite his unsuccessful tenure, Kuharich remains the only Irish coach to post back-to-back shutouts over their greatest rival, the USC Trojans, in 1960 (17–0) and 1961 (30–0).

=== Ara Parseghian era (1964–1974) ===
Ara Parseghian Statue, dedicated September 22, 2007

In 1964, Ara Parseghian left his job as the Northwestern head football coach when he was hired to take over the coaching duties at Notre Dame. He immediately brought the team back to a level of success in Irish football history that was comparable only to Rockne and Leahy. These three coaches have an 80% or greater winning percentage while at Notre Dame – Rockne at .881, Leahy at .864, and Parseghian at .836. Parseghian's teams never won fewer than seven nor lost more than three games during the ten-game regular seasons of the era.

In his first year, the Irish improved their record to 9–1 behind Heisman Trophy-winning quarterback John Huarte, but they lost any hope for a national championship in the last game of the season at USC when Craig Fertig connected with a touchdown pass to Rod Sherman. Parseghian earned coach of the year honors from the American Football Coaches Association, the Football Writers Association, and The Sporting News, as well as several others, and a cover story in Time magazine.

The 1966 team did finish unbeaten, finishing #1 in the AP Poll and winning the national championship in the process. The Irish had six shutout wins, each by 30 or more points. This includes a season-ending 51–0 win at #10 USC, the largest margin of victory by either side in the rivalry's history. This season is most remembered for a 10–10 tie at #2 Michigan State in the "Game of the Century" in which the injury-plagued Irish played for a tie rather than risking a loss.

It was under Parseghian as well that Notre Dame lifted its 40-plus year-old "no bowl games" policy, beginning with the season of 1969, after which the Irish played the #1 Texas Longhorns in the Cotton Bowl Classic, losing in the final minutes in a closely contested game. The following year, Parseghian's 9–1 squad ended Texas' Southwest Conference record 30-game winning streak in the Cotton Bowl. In 1971, Cliff Brown became the first African-American quarterback to start a game for the program. The Irish returned to glory by winning Parseghian's second national championship in 1973, sweeping through their regular-season schedule 10–0 and defeating #1 Alabama 24-23 in the Sugar Bowl by taking advantage of a fourth-quarter missed extra point by the Crimson Tide. Due to health issues, Parseghian was forced to retire from coaching after another bowl win over Alabama to conclude the 1974 season.

During Parseghian's eleven-year career, the Irish amassed a record of 95–17–4 and captured two national championships. The Irish finished in the AP Top 10 nine times and never ranked lower than #14 at the end of a season. Parseghian was also named coach of the year by several selectors in his national championship years of 1966 and 1973 and was inducted into the College Football Hall of Fame in 1980.

=== Dan Devine era (1975–1980) ===
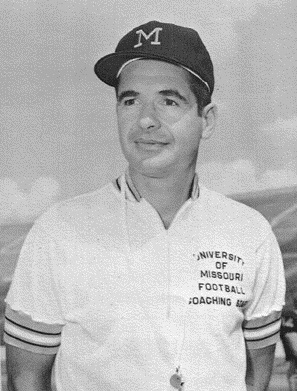
Coach Devine

Dan Devine was hired to take over as head coach upon Parseghian's retirement from Notre Dame in 1975. Devine was already a highly successful coach and had led Arizona State, Missouri, and the NFL's Green Bay Packers. Devine had been a leading candidate for the head coaching job at Notre Dame in 1964, when Ara Parseghian was hired. When approached for the job following Parseghian's resignation, Devine accepted immediately, joking that it was probably the shortest job interview in history. When he arrived at Notre Dame he already had a college coaching record of 120 wins, 40 losses, and eight ties and had led his teams to victory in four bowl games. At Notre Dame he would lead the Irish to 53 wins, 16 losses, and a tie as well as three bowl victories.

His lasting achievement came midway through this run, when the 1977 Notre Dame team won the national championship, led by junior quarterback Joe Montana. Before the game against USC, played at home on October 22, Devine changed the team's jerseys from navy blue & white to kelly green & gold, later known as the "green jersey game", resulting in a 49–19 victory over the Trojans. The Irish continued to wear green for the rest of Devine's tenure at the school. The championship season climaxed with a 38–10 win in the 1978 Cotton Bowl Classic over previously top-ranked Texas, led by Heisman Trophy winner Earl Campbell. The win vaulted the Irish from fifth to first in the polls.

The following season, the Irish lost their first two games including a shocking 3–0 loss to Missouri in Indiana but would recover to finish the regular season 8–3 and earn a berth in the Cotton Bowl against Houston. The Irish used three Montana touchdowns (two passing, one rushing) to recover from a 22-point deficit in the fourth quarter and win 35–34, the largest fourth-quarter comeback in college football history at the time. The game became known as the "Chicken Soup Game" after Montana ate a bowl of chicken soup at halftime while battling the flu. The 1979 and 1980 Irish did not live up to the standards set by earlier Devine teams, although the former season did see Vagas Ferguson set the single-season program rushing record (1,437 yards) that still stands as of the end of the 2025 season.

Because he had the unenviable task of following a legend, Devine came under heavy scrutiny while at Notre Dame, and some observers felt that he was never fully embraced by the Notre Dame community, despite winning a national championship. After a 5–2 start in his first season, rumors of incompetence were circulated and that Devine would be dismissed and replaced by Don Shula or even Ara Parseghian (who went so far as to say he would not return to Notre Dame under any circumstances). Even on the day of the 1977 USC game, "Dump Devine" bumper stickers were being sold outside Notre Dame Stadium. On August 15, 1980, Devine announced that he would be leaving Notre Dame at the end of season, saying he wanted to be able to spend more time with his wife.

=== Gerry Faust era (1981–1985) ===
Gerry Faust was a surprise choice when hired to replace Devine in 1981. Prior to Notre Dame, Faust had been one of the more successful high school football coaches in the country. As coach of Moeller High School in Cincinnati he amassed a 174–17–2 record over 19 seasons. Many of his players had gone on to play for Notre Dame; indeed, when he arrived in South Bend, he was reunited with nine of his former players from Moeller. Despite his success in the high school ranks, Faust's success at Notre Dame was mixed. In his first season, the Irish finished 5–6. In Faust's second season, Notre Dame improved slightly to 6–4–1. The most successful years under Faust were the 1983 and 1984 campaigns where the Irish finished 7–5 and made trips to the Liberty Bowl and Aloha Bowl respectively. His final record at Notre Dame was 30–26–1. To avoid being fired, Faust resigned at the end of the 1985 season. He announced his resignation prior to the final game of the year, where Notre Dame suffered a humiliating 58–7 loss at Miami; Allen Pinkett scored the Irish TD. Faust proceeded to take over as head coach at Akron.

=== Lou Holtz era (1986–1996) ===
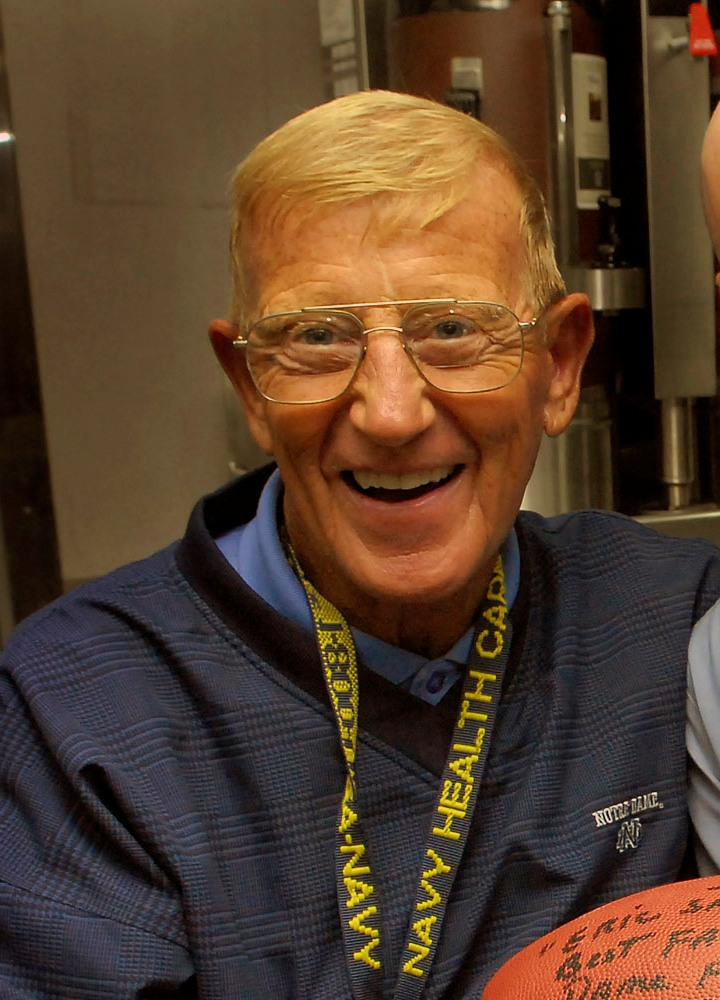
Coach Holtz

Lou Holtz had 17 years of head coaching experience by the time he was hired to lead the Irish. He had previously been head coach of William & Mary, North Carolina State, the NFL's New York Jets, Arkansas, and Minnesota. In contrast to Faust, Holtz was well known as a master motivator and a strict disciplinarian. The tone was set with Holtz's first meeting with his team as Irish head coach in 1986, immediately demanding his players sit up straight in their chairs and look him in the eye as he spoke. Holtz began in 1986 where his predecessor left off in 1985, finishing with an identical record of 5–6. However, unlike the 1985 squad, which was generally outcoached and outplayed, Holtz's 1986 edition was competitive in nearly every game, losing five out of those six games by a combined total of 14 points. That would be his only losing season as he posted a record of 95–24–2 over the next ten seasons adding up to a 100–30–2 record overall.

In 1987, Holtz led the Irish to an 8–4 record. Notre Dame's best player was star wide receiver Tim Brown, who would win the Heisman Trophy that season and is Notre Dame's seventh and most recent Heisman winner.

The 1988 campaign began with high hopes, as former Notre Dame coaches Rockne, Leahy, Parseghian, and Devine all won their first national championship in their third season with the program. The Irish defeated their first five opponents, ascending to the #4 ranking in the lead-up to a visit from the reigning national champion Miami Hurricanes. In a game which became known as Catholics vs. Convicts due to a popular T-shirt design on Notre Dame's campus, the Irish upset the Hurricanes 31–30 when Pat Terrell knocked down Steve Walsh's two-point conversion attempt with no time on the clock. When star players Ricky Watters and Tony Brooks showed up late for dinner right before the then top-ranked Irish played second-ranked USC in the final regular season game of 1988, in a controversial move, Holtz took his 10–0 Irish squad to Los Angeles without them. His move was vindicated when the Irish defeated USC anyway. Holtz was named national coach of the year, and a win over No. 3 West Virginia in the Fiesta Bowl captured the Irish's 11th-all time national championship. 1988 remains Notre Dame's most recent undefeated season and national championship.

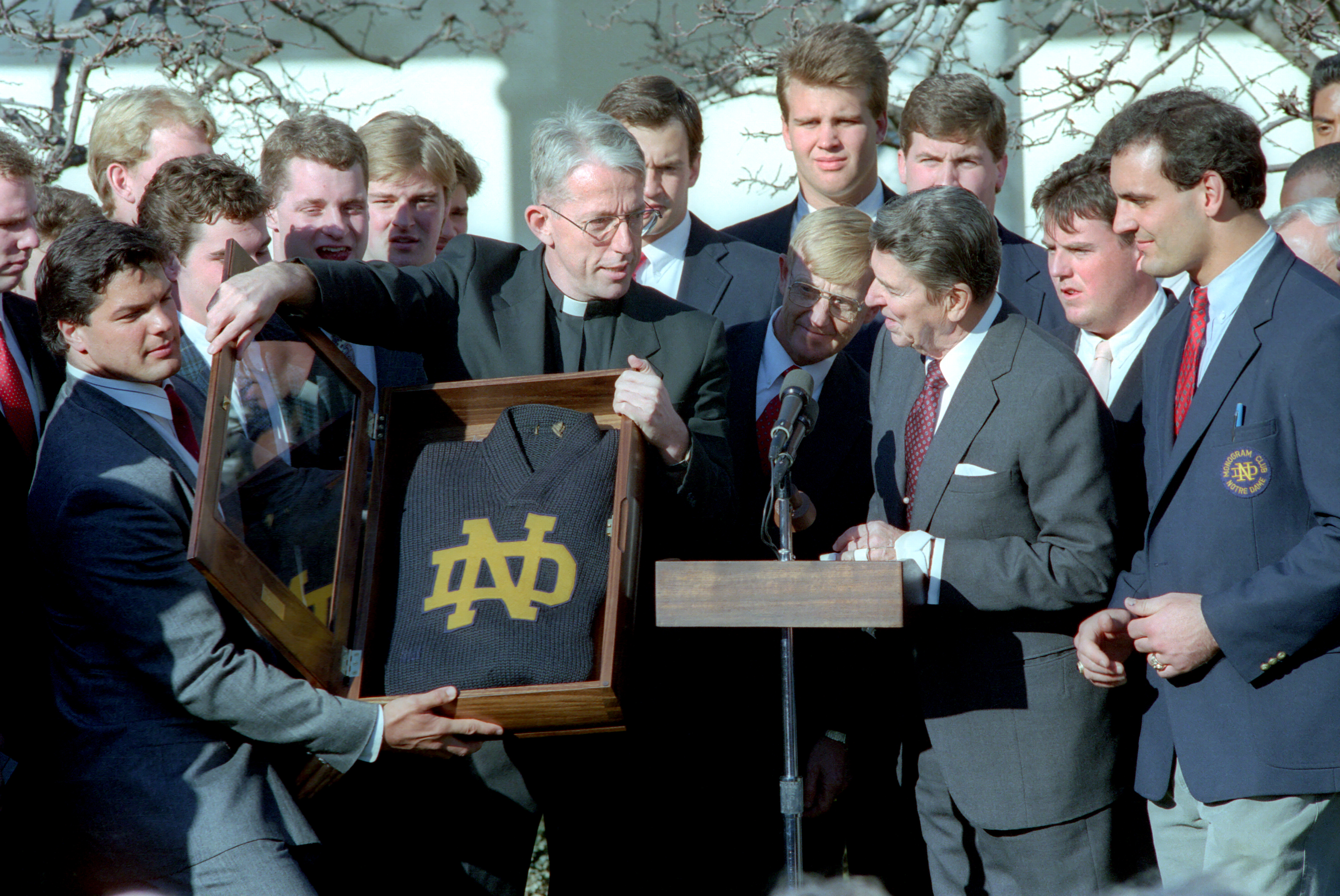
The 1988 national champion Fighting Irish visited President Ronald Reagan in the White House in January 1989.

In 1989, Holtz led the Irish to a 12–1 record. The Irish began the season in the Kickoff Classic game in East Rutherford, New Jersey, against Virginia. The Irish won by a score of 36–13 and ascended to the #1 spot in the AP Poll. Next, top-ranked Notre Dame defeated #2 Michigan by a score of 24–19. After nine more consecutive victories to begin the season 11–0, the Irish would lose to #7 Miami in the final week of the season, ending Notre Dame's 23-game winning streak. Holtz would lead the Irish to a victory in the Orange Bowl over #1 Colorado to end the season, finishing #2 in the AP poll behind Miami.

After beginning the 1990 season with a #1 ranking and a victory over #4 Michigan by a score of 28–24 and two more wins for a 3–0 start, the Irish took their first loss of the season, losing to Stanford by a score of 36–31. The Irish would ascend back to #1 on the strength of a home win over #2 Miami, a game that saw the end of the series between the two until 2010. However, late-season losses to Penn State and Colorado in the Orange Bowl would eliminate the Irish from national championship contention. The 1991 Fighting Irish began the season 8-1, but lost back-to-back games for the first time since 1987 when they again lost to Penn State. The Irish would receive a berth in the Sugar Bowl in New Orleans, Louisiana, where they defeated Florida by a score of 39–28.

In 1992, Notre Dame finished 10–1–1. After defeating Northwestern to start the season, the Fighting Irish tied #5 Michigan, their first tie of the Holtz era. This season saw the Irish's largest win in history against Purdue, a 48–0 win at Notre Dame Stadium, and a 28–3 Cotton Bowl against previously unbeaten #4 Texas A&M.

The Irish enjoyed another successful season in 1993, finishing the season at 11–1. After scoring 27 points in wins over Northwestern and #2 Michigan to start the season, the Irish defeated their next six opponents to enter a matchup with undefeated #1 Florida State 8–0 and ranked just behind the Seminoles at #2. For the first time, ESPN's College GameDay decided to make a visit to campus to host the show live on Saturday morning. In a classic, the Irish defeated the Seminoles 31–24, ascending to the #1 ranking a day later. However, a loss to #17 Boston College on a game-winning field goal as time expired by a score of 41–39 ended the Irish's national championship aspirations. The Irish would face a rematch with #6 Texas A&M in the Cotton Bowl to finish the season, a game the Irish won by a score of 24–21. Controversially, Notre Dame finished #2 in the AP poll behind a team in Florida State it had beaten.

In 1994, Holtz led Notre Dame to a 6–5–1 record, the Irish's worst record since Holtz's first season in 1986. The team lost three of four games midseason to drop out of the rankings for the first time since 1986. The Irish would improve to 9–3 in 1995, but lost to #8 Florida State in the Orange Bowl. Lou Holtz's final season at Notre Dame in 1996 resulted in an 8–3 record. The season notably saw Notre Dame's first participation in the Emerald Isle Classic in Ireland, a 54–27 win over Navy, and an overtime loss to USC, snapping the Irish's 13-game non-losing streak against the Trojans.

Holtz's option offense, which helped catapult Notre Dame to many victories in the late 1980s and early 1990s, also helped rack up impressive recruiting classes. During the 1989 season, Holtz had the following future NFL players on offense: QB Rick Mirer, RB Ricky Watters, RB Anthony Johnson, RB Rodney Culver RB Dorsey Levens, and WR Raghib Ismail. In 1990, he added RB Jeff Burris (who would later move to safety), FB Jerome Bettis and TE Irv Smith. 1991 saw the additions of RB Reggie Brooks and FB Ray Zellars. 1992 saw the addition of WR Derrick Mayes. For 1993, he added FB Marc Edwards. In 1995, he added RB Autry Denson. From the 1987–1995 NFL drafts, there were a total of 65 Notre Dame players selected. Overall, Holtz took Notre Dame to one undefeated season, nine consecutive New Year's Day bowl games, and top 10 finishes in the AP poll in five seasons, as well as overseeing the majority of the longest winning streak against USC in program history (11 games). Holtz retired from Notre Dame following the 1996 season, but would unretire in 1999 to accept the head coaching position at South Carolina where he would serve until the completion of the 2004 season.

=== Bob Davie era (1997–2001) ===
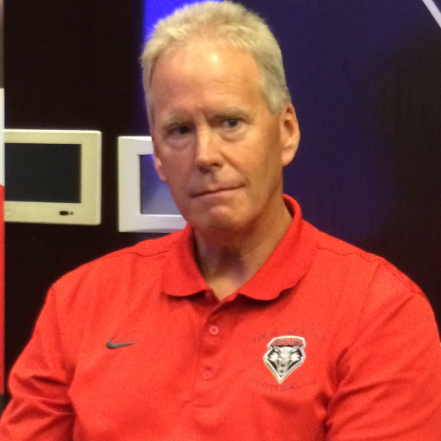
Coach Davie

Bob Davie, who had been Holtz's defensive coordinator from 1994 to 1996, was promoted to head coach when Holtz retired. Davie, who turned down a head coaching offer from Purdue to accept the Irish's head coaching position, was a well-respected defensive mind who had also served as defensive coordinator at Tulane and Texas A&M. Davie had also filled in as head coach for one game during the 1995 season when Lou Holtz was dealing with a health issue. One of his first major decisions was to fire long-time offensive line coach Joe Moore, who then successfully sued the university for age discrimination. On Davie's watch, the team suffered three bowl game losses (1997 Independence Bowl, 1999 Gator Bowl, and 2001 Fiesta Bowl) and it failed to qualify for a bowl game in two others (1999 and 2001). The highlight of Davie's tenure was a 36–20 upset win in 1998 over #5 Michigan, the defending national champions.

On December 17, 1999, Notre Dame was placed on probation by the NCAA. The association's Committee on Infractions found two series of violations. The New York Times reported "the main one involved the actions of a booster, Kimberly Dunbar, who lavished gifts on football players with money she later pleaded guilty to embezzling." In the second series of events, a football player was accused of trying to sell several complimentary game tickets and of using others as repayment of a loan. The player was also said "to have been romantically involved with a woman (not Dunbar), a part-time tutor at the university, who wrote a term paper for another player for a small fee and provided players with meals, lodging and gifts." The Dunbar violation began while Lou Holtz was head coach: "According to the NCAA committee report, Dunbar, the woman at the center of the more serious violations, had become romantically involved with several Notre Dame football players from June 1995 to January 1998 and had a child with one, Jarvis Edison." Notre Dame was placed on probation for two years and lost one of its 85 football scholarships each year in what the Times termed "minor" penalties.

The 2001 Fiesta Bowl was Notre Dame's first invitation to the Bowl Championship Series. The Irish lost by 32 points to Oregon State but would finish No. 15 in the AP Poll, Davie's highest final ranking as head coach. Despite Davie's rocky tenure, new athletic director Kevin White gave the coach a contract extension following the 2000 season, then saw the team start 0–3 in 2001 – the first such start in school history. Disappointed by the on-field results, coupled with the Joe Moore and Kim Dunbar scandals, the administration decided to dismiss Davie after the 2001 season. His final record at Notre Dame was 35–25.

==== George O'Leary controversy ====
On December 9, 2001, Notre Dame hired George O'Leary, the head coach at Georgia Tech, to replace Davie. However, while researching a story on O'Leary, New Hampshire Union Leader reporter Jim Fennell uncovered misrepresentations in O'Leary's resume that had influenced the administration's decision to hire him. The resulting media scandal embarrassed Notre Dame officials and tainted O'Leary; he resigned five days later before coaching a single practice, recruiting a single player, or hiring a single assistant coach. O'Leary's tenure is the shortest of any head coach in FBS history. O'Leary would go on to become the head football coach at the University of Central Florida.

=== Tyrone Willingham era (2002–2004) ===
Once again in need of a new head coach, the school turned to Tyrone Willingham, the head coach at Stanford. Willingham's hiring made him the first African American head coach in Notre Dame football history. Bringing a feeling of change and excitement to campus, Willingham led the 2002 squad to a 10–2 regular season record, including an 8–0 start with wins over #7 Michigan and #11 Florida State and a #4 ranking. This great early start, however, would be the lone highlight of Willingham's tenure, as Notre Dame finished the year with a loss to Boston College, then lopsided losses to USC and North Carolina State in the Gator Bowl. The program faltered over the next two seasons under Willingham, compiling an 11–12 record. During this time, Notre Dame lost a game by at least 30 points on five occasions. Furthermore, Willingham's 2004 recruiting class was judged by analysts to be the worst at Notre Dame in more than two decades. Citing Notre Dame's third consecutive four-touchdown loss to arch-rival USC compounded by another year of subpar recruiting efforts, the Willingham era ended on November 30, 2004 after the conclusion of the season when the university chose to terminate him and pay out the remainder of Willingham's six-year contract.

=== Charlie Weis era (2005–2009) ===
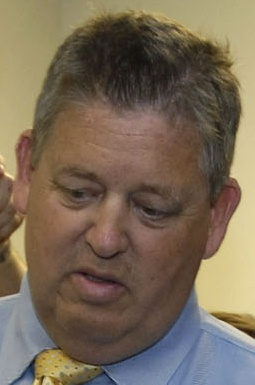
Coach Weis

After Willingham's firing, Notre Dame initially pursued Utah head coach Urban Meyer, who had been an Irish assistant from 1996 to 2000 and had a clause in his Utah contract that stated he could take the Notre Dame head coaching job without paying a buyout. After Meyer accepted the Florida head coaching position and turned down the Irish, Charlie Weis left the NFL's New England Patriots, where he won three Super Bowls as offensive coordinator, to become head football coach for the Irish beginning with the 2005 season. A first-time head coach when he was hired by Notre Dame, Weis was officially introduced on December 12, 2004. Weis' hiring as the Irish's 30th head football coach made him the first Notre Dame graduate to hold the football head coaching position on a full-fledged basis since Joe Kuharich. Weis signed a six-year contract worth about $2 million annually excluding incentives.

To kick off his inaugural season, Weis led the Irish to back-to-back road wins over ranked teams, the first time that had been done by a Notre Dame coach since Knute Rockne. On September 25, Weis and the Irish traveled to Seattle to face Washington and former head coach Tyrone Willingham, who was hired by the Huskies to be their head coach two weeks after getting fired at Notre Dame. The Irish won by a score of 36–17. Entering the rivalry game with USC, defending national champions and owners of a 27-game winning streak, the Irish had risen to #9 in the AP Poll. In one of the most famous games in the rivalry's history, USC defeated Notre Dame 34–31. The game concluded with Trojan running back and eventual Heisman winner Reggie Bush, who had already scored three touchdowns that day, illegally pushing quarterback Matt Leinart into the end zone on the final play of the game in a play now known as the "Bush Push". The Irish won their remaining five games to earn an appearance in the Fiesta Bowl. They were defeated there by the Ohio State Buckeyes 34–20 to finish the season 9–3 and #9 in the AP poll, their highest final ranking since 1993. Quarterback Brady Quinn broke numerous team passing records that season and became a top Heisman Trophy contender. Wide receiver Jeff Samardzija was the team's leading receiver and also broke Notre Dame's single-season records for receiving yards and touchdowns. During the 2005 season, Notre Dame signed Weis to a big raise and ten-year contract extension that was set to keep the coach at the university through the 2015 season.

Weis and the Irish went into the 2006 season with a No. 2 preseason ranking in the ESPN/Coaches Poll. They finished the regular season with a 10–2 record, losing only to Michigan and USC. Notre Dame accepted a bid to the 2007 Sugar Bowl, losing to LSU 41–14. This marked their ninth consecutive postseason loss, the longest drought in NCAA history. As a result, Notre Dame dropped to #17 in the final rankings. In the wake of a graduating class that sent eleven players to the NFL, the 2007 season included various negative milestones: the most losses in a single year (9), two of the ten worst losses in program history (38–0 losses to both Michigan and USC), and the first 6-game losing streak for home games in ND history. The Naval Academy recorded their first win over the Irish since 1963, breaking Notre Dame's NCAA-record 43-game win streak.

In 2008, the Irish started 4–1 but completed the regular season with a 6–6 record, including a 24–23 home loss to Syracuse, the first time that Notre Dame had fallen to an eight-loss team. Quarterback Jimmy Clausen was the team's star player, completing over 60% of his passes. Despite speculation the university might fire Weis, the university announced that he would remain head coach. Weis's Notre Dame squad ended the season breaking the Irish's NCAA bowl losing streak by beating Hawaii 49–21 in the Hawaii Bowl. Weis entered the 2009 season with the expectation from the Notre Dame administration that his team would be in position to compete for a BCS Bowl berth. Notre Dame started the first part of the season 4–2, with close losses to Michigan and USC. Sitting at 6–2, however, Notre Dame lost to Navy for the second time in three years, which became the first loss in a four-game losing streak to finish the season. Quarterback Jimmy Clausen and wide receiver Golden Tate would forgo their senior seasons and enter the NFL draft. Weis was fired on November 30, 2009. According to his buyout provision, Weis was to be paid $6 million first and then $2.05 million annually until the contract ran out in December 2015 for a total of about $19 million. During that time, Weis made more money annually not to coach the Irish than his successor Brian Kelly earned to coach the team.

=== Brian Kelly era (2010–2021) ===
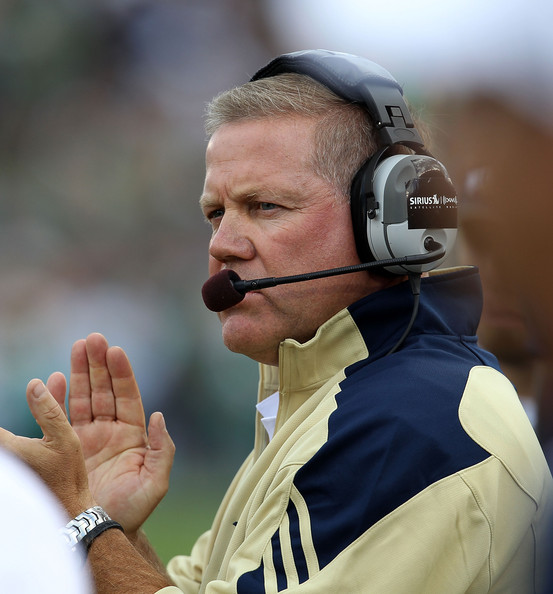
Coach Kelly

On December 10, 2009, Cincinnati head coach Brian Kelly became the 31st head coach of the Fighting Irish after leading the Bearcats to a 12–0 record and BCS bowl-game berth, but he left the team before the bowl game. Kelly's hiring surprised very few as he was a northern Irish Catholic who was considered one of college football's rising stars. In his first season, Kelly led the Fighting Irish to an 8–5 record. Tragedy struck early in the season when Declan Sullivan, a junior working for the athletic department, died while filming a practice on a scissor lift in dangerously high winds. Dayne Crist started the season at quarterback but was injured for a second consecutive year, this time in the Tulsa game, which the Irish lost. Kelly turned to freshman quarterback Tommy Rees, who led the Irish to victories in the last three games against #15 Utah, Army in Yankee Stadium, and breaking an eight-year losing streak to USC in the LA Coliseum. Kelly guided the Irish to a 33–17 win over Miami (FL) in the 2010 Sun Bowl to finish 2010 with an 8–5 record. With wideout Michael Floyd returning for his senior season and an outstanding recruiting class that included several highly touted defensive linemen, Kelly and the Irish looked to improve on their 8–5 record from the prior year. However, an early season upset to a Skip Holtz-led South Florida team and a last-second loss to Michigan in Ann Arbor, games in which the Irish committed 10 total turnovers, left the Irish at 0–2 to start the season. The Irish bounced back to beat #15 Michigan State and had two 4-game winning streaks, with the only loss during that stretch coming at the hands of USC. The Irish also broke Navy's 2-game winning streak over Notre Dame. Notre Dame lost 18–14 to Florida State in the 2011 Champs Sports Bowl, concluding the 2011 campaign with an 8–5 record overall, identical to the 2010 season. In the team's losses, multiple turnovers from the quarterback position were often the culprit, and as a whole turnovers at critical times in the game often derailed potential Irish comebacks.

On September 12, 2012, during the football program's 125th season, Notre Dame announced that it would leave the Big East Conference for the Atlantic Coast Conference, excluding the football and hockey programs. This move became official on July 1, 2013. While the Fighting Irish football team remained an FBS independent, it agreed to play five games per season against ACC teams starting with the 2014 football season. In return, Notre Dame became eligible to participate in the ACC's sub-BCS level bowl arrangements.

The 2012 season was another entry in historic third seasons for Notre Dame head coaches. The Irish began the season 7–0, including wins over ranked rivals in Michigan State, Michigan, and Stanford. The game against the Cardinal required a goal-line stand against running back Stepfan Taylor in overtime to preserve the win for the Irish. The season's signature win came at #8 Oklahoma with ESPN's College GameDay in town. On November 18, after a loss by #1 Oregon, Notre Dame became ranked #1 in the nation in both the AP and Coaches' polls after reaching 11–0 during the regular season for the first time since 1993, also ranking #1 in the BCS standings for the first time in the 14-year history of the selection system. After defeating USC on November 24, Notre Dame concluded its first 12–0 regular season, and the Irish were soon formally named to appear in the BCS National Championship Game for the first time. In that game, on January 7, 2013, the Irish lost to Alabama 42–14. The strength of the 2012 Fighting Irish was its defense, captained by senior leader Manti Te'o, who broke the school record for interceptions by a linebacker with 7 and finished second to Johnny Manziel in Heisman Trophy voting.

Coming off the previous year's national title game appearance, the Fighting Irish were dealt a blow when 2012 starting quarterback, Everett Golson, was suspended from the University due to an academic violation. Senior Tommy Rees then took over. Notre Dame's 2013 season ended with a record of 9–4, a victory over Rutgers in the Pinstripe Bowl, and a #20 AP poll ranking. The 2014 season started off with 6 straight victories and a #5 national ranking heading into a showdown with #2 Florida State in Tallahassee, Florida. FSU won that game 31–27, on a controversial offensive pass interference call that brought back a last-second Notre Dame touchdown. The Fighting Irish bounced back with a win against Navy before dropping their final 4 games of the season. They did win the Music City Bowl by defeating the LSU Tigers and finished the season at an 8–5 record.

The 2015 Fighting Irish began its season with another new offensive coordinator, Mike Sanford Jr. Led for most of the year by sophomore quarterback DeShone Kizer, the Irish had fourteen plays of over 50 yards during the season, which was a school record, including two touchdowns of over 90 yards (a 91-yard touchdown run by C. J. Prosise and a 98-yard touchdown run by Josh Adams). The Irish only had two in the previous 126 years of Notre Dame football. They finished the regular season averaging 34 points per game, including a 62-point effort against UMass, the most points in a game since 1996. The Irish began the season 10–1 and were in position for a College Football Playoff appearance, but lost a last-second game to Stanford to finish with a 10–2 record and a berth in the Fiesta Bowl. Star linebacker Jaylon Smith was injured early in the game which became a loss to Ohio State. The 2016 season ended with a 4–8 record, Brian Kelly's worst win–loss record at Notre Dame. The tone for the season was set early, with a heartbreaking double overtime loss to Texas in the season opener. Just 4 games into the season, Brian Kelly fired defensive coordinator Brian VanGorder. At the end of the season, starting quarterback DeShone Kizer declared for the NFL draft and backup quarterback Malik Zaire announced he would be transferring in the winter after graduation. Amidst speculation that Kelly's job was in jeopardy and that Kelly was looking to leave Notre Dame, athletics director Jack Swarbrick announced that Kelly would return for the 2017 season.

The 2017 season was one of Kelly's strongest seasons at ND. An early one-point loss to #2 Georgia was the only blemish on an 8-1 start, keyed by a 49-14 blowout over rival USC. The tough running of running back Josh Adams behind an experienced and talented offensive line, which included future top-10 picks Quenton Nelson and Mike McGlinchey and won the Joe Moore Award as the best offensive line in that nation, allowed Notre Dame to string together 6 consecutive 20+ point victories. However, when #3 Notre Dame visited #7 Miami in South Florida on November 7, an embarrassing 41-8 loss effectively ended the Irish hopes of a playoff run. They ended the season with a win over LSU in the Music City Bowl. The Irish opened the 2018 season at home against Michigan and won, 24–17. After benching quarterback Brandon Wimbush in favor of Ian Book, the Irish then won the remainder of their regular season games, including victories over #7 Stanford, #24 Virginia Tech, #12 Syracuse, and Northwestern. This led to Notre Dame's first undefeated regular season since 2012. They were ranked #3 in the nation by the College Football Playoff committee and selected to play in the College Football Playoff semifinal at the Cotton Bowl against Clemson. Notre Dame's undefeated streak came to an end after losing to the eventual national champions 30–3 to finish the season at 12–1. Kelly was named AP Coach of the Year and Home Depot Coach of the Year for the 2018 season.

Kelly and the Fighting Irish started off the 2019 season with a #9 ranking in the AP Poll. Notre Dame won their first two games before dropping a 23–17 result to #3 Georgia. Notre Dame won their next three games before dropping a 45–14 game to #19 Michigan. Notre Dame closed out the regular season with victories in their last five games, followed by a win in the Camping World Bowl 33–9 over Iowa State.

In response to the COVID-19 pandemic and the cancellation of regular season scheduled games, Notre Dame joined the Atlantic Coast Conference (ACC) in football for a single season in 2020 and played a full slate of conference matches. The Irish won all ten of their games, including a mid-season contest against perennial conference power and top-ranked Clemson. The Fighting Irish defeated the Tigers 47–40 in double overtime. However, Clemson defeated the Irish in a rematch in the ACC Championship Game 34–10. Notre Dame qualified for the College Football Playoff as the #4 seed. In the College Football Playoff Semifinals against Alabama at the Rose Bowl, Notre Dame lost 31–14 to finish with a 10–2 record. In what would become Kelly's final season as head coach in 2021, the Fighting Irish were ranked #9 to begin the season, but struggled in their first two games, beating Florida State 41–38 and Toledo 32–29. Following a 24–13 loss to #7 Cincinnati, Kelly helped lead the Fighting Irish to a seven-game winning streak to finish the regular season 11–1 and earn a berth in the Fiesta Bowl.

On November 29, 2021, Kelly resigned as Notre Dame head coach to accept a ten-year, $95 million contract offer to become head coach at LSU. In so doing, Kelly became the first Irish head coach since Thomas A. Barry in 1907 to leave Notre Dame for another coaching job. Kelly left the Irish as the program's all-time winningest head coach.

=== Marcus Freeman era (2021–present) ===
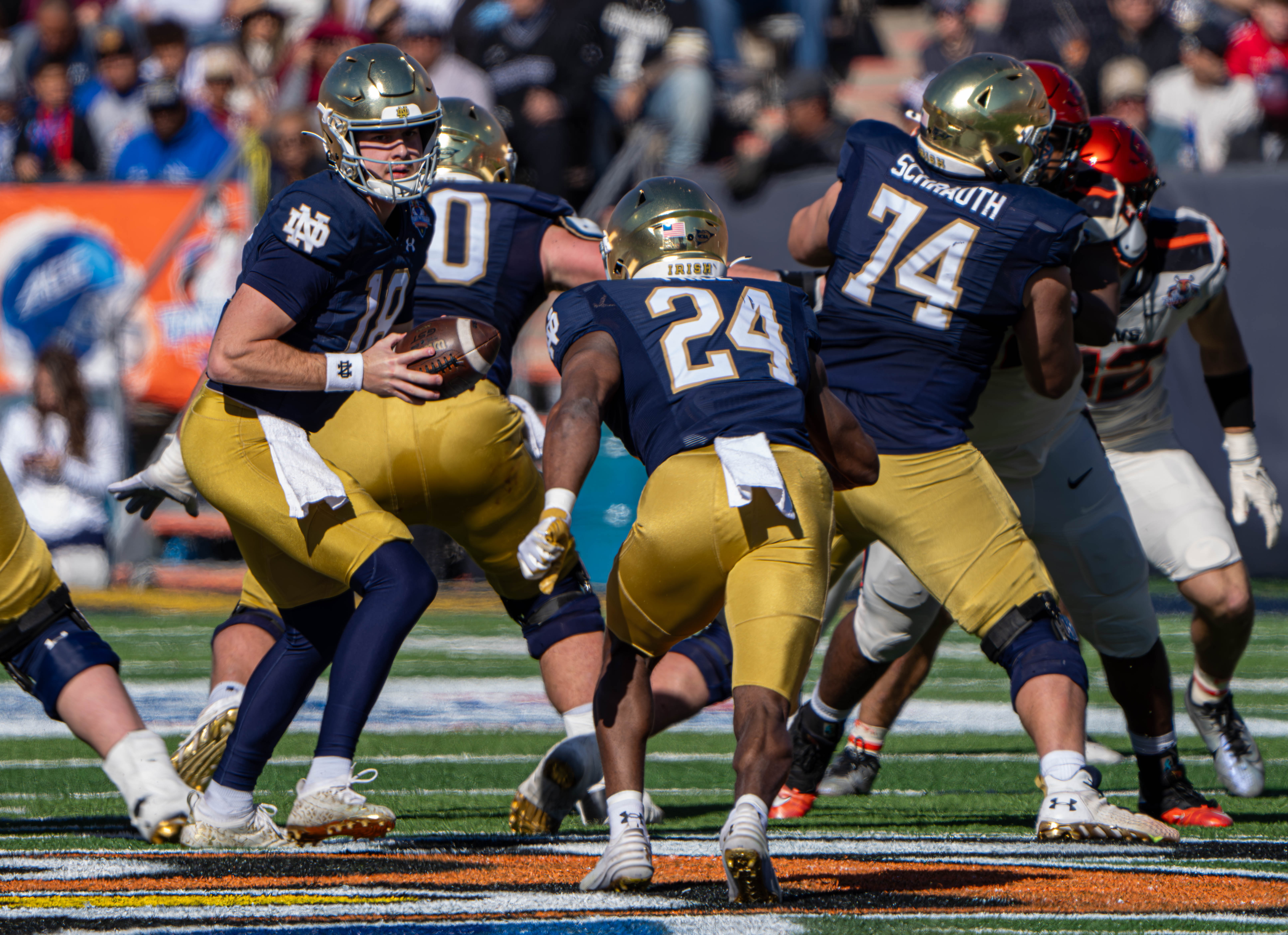
Notre Dame in the 2023 Sun Bowl

On December 3, 2021, Notre Dame's defensive coordinator Marcus Freeman was promoted to the head coaching position to replace Brian Kelly, becoming the 32nd head coach in program history. The second African American head coach in the history of the Irish football program, Freeman signed a five-year contract worth $4 million annually excluding incentives. Freeman took control immediately, coaching the Irish in their Fiesta Bowl loss to Oklahoma State.

Freeman opened the 2022 season with losses to Ohio State (his alma mater) and Marshall, thus becoming first head coach in Notre Dame history to start his tenure with three losses. He collected his first win the following week against California. Freeman's Irish would go on to finish the regular season ranked 19th with a record of 8-4, including an upset win over #5 Clemson. They were awarded a berth in the Gator Bowl where they defeated South Carolina 45–38. In 2023, Freeman guided Notre Dame to a 10-win season. Safety Xavier Watts received the Bronko Nagurski Trophy for college football's best defensive player and the team earned victories over #17 Duke (and future Notre Dame quarterback Riley Leonard), #10 USC, and #19 Oregon State in the Sun Bowl. Notre Dame finished the year ranked #14 in the final AP Top 25.

Freeman and the Fighting Irish played their first home game of the 2024 season against Northern Illinois as the #5 ranked team in the AP Top 25 and as a 28.5-point favorite to win. They fell to the Huskies 16-14, with quarterback Riley Leonard throwing two interceptions and the team giving up two blocked field goals. It was the second early-season home loss for the Irish against a heavy underdog in three years following the 2022 loss to Marshall, the first-ever win by a Mid-American Conference football program against a top 5 team, the first-ever Huskie win against a top 10 team, and one of the largest point-spread upsets in modern college football. Despite the upset, the Irish won every remaining game to complete the regular season 11-1 and hosted a home game in the first year of the expanded college football playoffs in which they beat #10 Indiana 27-17. They next beat the SEC champion #2 Georgia Bulldogs in the Sugar Bowl by a score of 23-10, earning the program's first major bowl win since the 1993 season and followed it with a 27-24 win over #6 Penn State in the Orange Bowl to advance to the 2025 National Championship Game, their first appearance in the title game since 2012. The Irish fell short of winning a national championship as they were defeated by Ohio State by a score of 34-23. Watts was voted a consensus All-American at safety for the second consecutive year, while Freeman won the Dodd and the Bear Bryant trophies for national coach of the year.

The 2025 Irish opened the season expecting to build on the previous season's run to the national championship game but suffered close losses to eventual College Football Playoff participants Miami and Texas A&M in the first two games of the season by just 4 points combined. Despite 10 consecutive wins to finish the season 10–2, a Heisman-finalist season from running back Jeremiyah Love, and a top-10 ranking in every edition of the CFP rankings, the Irish were left out of the playoff in favor of Miami and Alabama. The Irish and the Hurricanes flipped spots despite neither playing on championship weekend and Alabama was put in the playoffs over Notre Dame despite having 3 losses, one of them to 5-7 Florida State, who lost to 3 teams that Notre Dame defeated soundly. Notre Dame elected to decline its invitation to the Pop-Tarts Bowl as a result. Love won the Doak Walker Award and was named a unanimous All-American, as was cornerback Leonard Moore.

== Personnel ==
=== Coaching staff ===
Notre Dame Fighting Irish
Name	Position	Consecutive season(s) at Notre Dame in current position	Previous position
Mike Denbrock	Offensive coordinator / tight ends	2nd	LSU – Offensive coordinator / tight ends (2023)
Chris Ash	Defensive coordinator	1st	Jacksonville Jaguars – Scout (2024)
Marty Biagi	Special teams coordinator	3rd	Ole Miss – Special teams coordinator (2022)
Gino Guidugli	Quarterbacks / pass game coordinator	3rd	Cincinnati – Offensive coordinator / quarterbacks (2022)
Ja'Juan Seider	Associate head coach / running backs	1st	Penn State – Associate head coach / co-offensive coordinator / running backs (2024)
Mike Brown	Wide receivers	2nd	Wisconsin – Associate head coach / wide receivers (2023)
Joe Rudolph	Offensive line	3rd	Virginia Tech – Offensive line (2022)
Charlie Partridge	Defensive line	1st	Indianapolis Colts – Defensive line (2024–2025)
Max Bullough	Linebackers	2nd	Notre Dame - Graduate assistant (Linebackers) (2023)
Mike Mickens	Defensive backs / defensive pass game coordinator	6th	Cincinnati – Cornerbacks (2018–2019)
Loren Landow	Director of football performance	2nd	Denver Broncos – Head strength & conditioning coach (2018–2023)

== Championships and distinctions ==
=== National championships ===
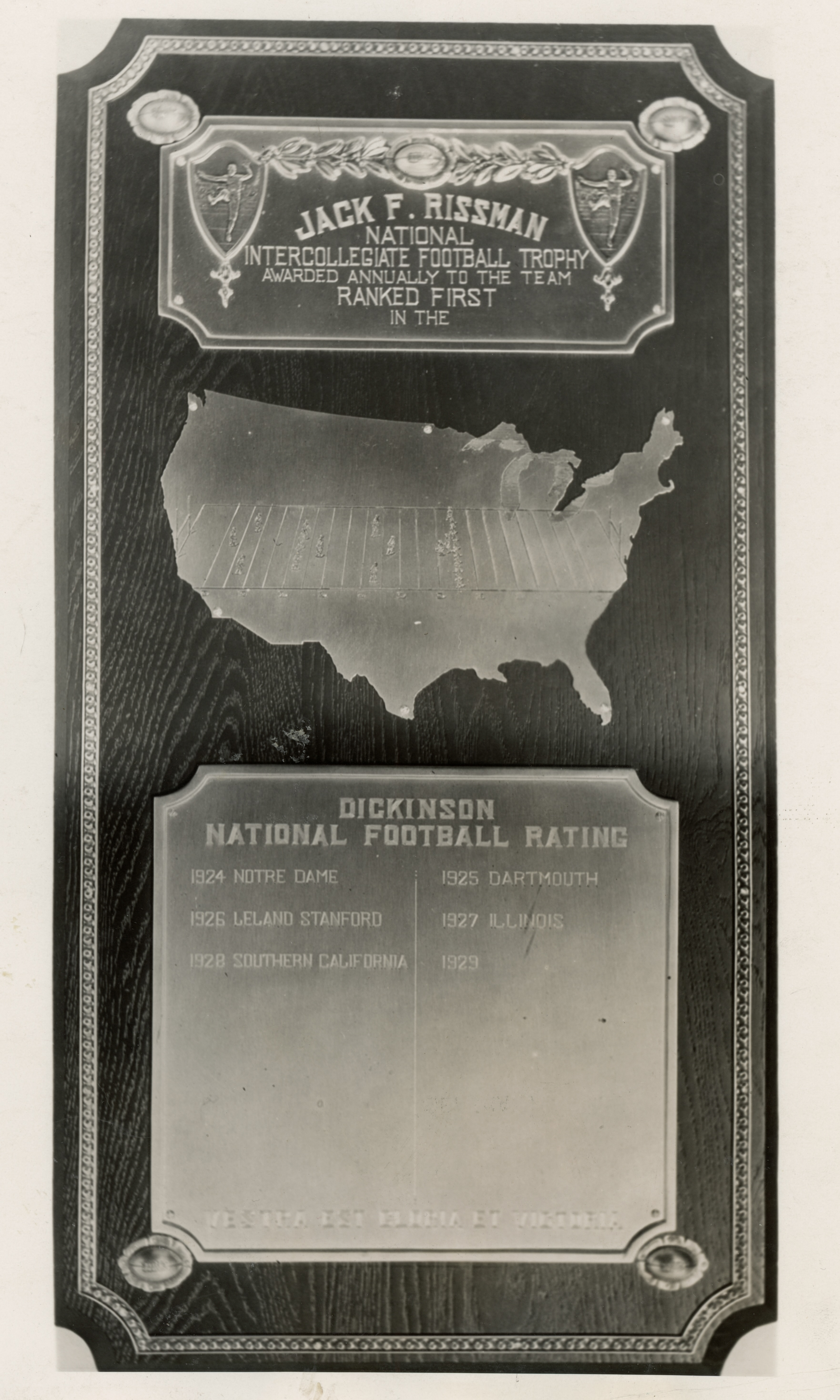
Jack F. Rissman Trophy awarded to the team ranked No. 1 by the Dickinson System. Notre Dame gained permanent possession of the trophy by winning it three times.

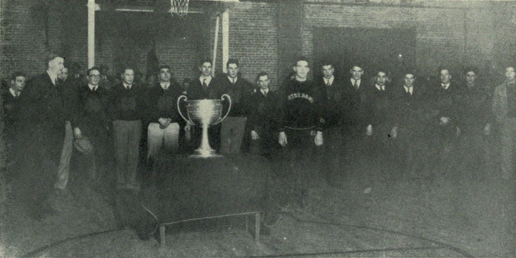
Notre Dame receiving the Albert Russel Erskine Trophy following the 1929 season.

- Notre Dame was ranked No. 1 by the Dickinson System in 1924, 1929, and 1930 and awarded the Rissman Trophy. Knute Rockne's teams gained permanent possession of this national championship trophy by winning it three times in ten years.
- Notre Dame has won eight wire service national championships awarded by the AP Poll or Coaches Poll, second most in the post-1936 poll era.
- The three Dickinson System and eight wire service national championships make a total of 11, but Notre Dame is often credited with additional national championships. The 1938, 1953, and 1964 seasons are part of the reason for the discrepancy. In the 1938 season, 8–1 Notre Dame was awarded the Knute Rockne Memorial Trophy and the national championship by the Dickinson System, while TCU (which finished 11–0) was awarded the championship by the Associated Press. In the 1953 season, an undefeated Notre Dame team (9–0–1) was named national champion by almost every major selector except the AP and UPI (coaches') polls, where the Irish finished second in both to 10–1 Maryland. In 1964 Notre Dame was named national champions by the National Football Foundation and awarded the MacArthur Bowl. As Notre Dame has a policy of only recognizing AP and Coaches' Poll national championships post-1936, the school does not officially recognize the 1938, 1953, or 1964 national championships.
- Beyond their eleven claimed national championships, Notre Dame has been named national champion by at least one NCAA-designated "major selector" in an additional eleven seasons: 1919, 1920, 1927, 1938, 1953, 1964, 1967, 1970, 1989, 1993, and 2012.

Notre Dame's 11 claimed national championships are:

Year	Coach	Selector	Record	Bowl	Final AP	Final Coaches
1924	Knute Rockne	Dickinson System	10–0	Won Rose	–	–
1929	Knute Rockne	Dickinson System	9–0	–	–	–
1930	Knute Rockne	Dickinson System	10–0	–	–	–
1943	Frank Leahy	AP	9–1	–	No. 1	–
1946	Frank Leahy	AP	8–0–1	–	No. 1	–
1947	Frank Leahy	AP	9–0	–	No. 1	–
1949	Frank Leahy	AP	10–0	–	No. 1	–
1966	Ara Parseghian	AP, Coaches	9–0–1	–	No. 1	No. 1
1973	Ara Parseghian	AP	11–0	Won Sugar	No. 1	No. 4
1977	Dan Devine	AP, Coaches	11–1	Won Cotton	No. 1	No. 1
1988	Lou Holtz	AP, Coaches	12–0	Won Fiesta	No. 1	No. 1
National Championships			11			

Following its appearance in the 1925 Rose Bowl, Notre Dame did not play in a post-season game for 44 consecutive years (1925–1968), including after many of the team's most successful seasons from the Rockne era in the 1920s and the Leahy era in the 1940s. The university's stated reasons for its self-imposed hiatus were that bowl games were "glorified exhibitions" that played no part in national championship selections and that they extended the season too far to the detriment of players' academic progress.

=== Appearances in the final Associated Press poll ===
Notre Dame has made 874 appearances in the Associated Press poll over 71 seasons. Notre Dame has spent 591 weeks in the Top 10, 318 weeks in the Top 5, and 98 weeks at No. 1. Notre Dame has finished the year ranked in the final Associated Press poll of the season 56 times:

Year	Ranking	Record
1936	8	6–2
1937	9	6–2–1
1938	5	8–1
1939	13	7–2
1941	3	8–0–1
1942	6	7–2–1
1943	1	9–1
1944	9	8–2
1945	9	7–2–1
1946	1	8–0–1

Year	Ranking	Record
1947	1	9–0
1948	2	9–0
1949	1	9–0
1952	3	7–2–1
1953	2	8–0–1
1954	4	8–1
1955	9	8–2
1957	10	6–3
1958	17	6–4
1959	17	5–5

Year	Ranking	Record
1964	3	9–1
1965	9	7–2–1
1966	1	9–0–1
1967	5	8–2
1968	5	7–2–1
1969	5	8–2–1
1970	2	10–1
1971	13	8–2
1972	14	8–3
1973	1	11–0

Year	Ranking	Record
1974	6	10–2
1976	12	9–3
1977	1	11–1
1978	7	9–3
1980	9	9–2–1
1987	17	8–4
1988	1	12–0
1989	2	12–1
1990	6	9–3
1991	13	10–3

Year	Ranking	Record
1992	4	10–1–1
1993	2	11–1
1995	11	9–3
1996	19	8–3
1998	22	9–3
2000	15	9–3
2002	17	10–3
2005	9	9–3
2006	17	10–3
2012	4	12–1

Year	Ranking	Record
2013	20	9–4
2015	11	10–3
2017	11	10–3
2018	5	12–1
2019	12	11–2
2020	5	10–2
2021	8	11–2
2022	18	9–4
2023	14	10–3
2024	2	14–2

Year	Ranking	Record
2025	10	10-2

=== Team awards ===
- Bonniwell Trophy - National Champions as awarded by the Veteran Athletes of Philadelphia

Notre Dame Fighting Irish - 1924, 1929, 1930

- Rissman Trophy - Dickinson System National Champions

Notre Dame Fighting Irish - 1924, 1929, 1930

Notre Dame retained permanent ownership of the traveling Rissman Trophy following their third national championship.

- Albert Russel Erskine Trophy - National Champions

Notre Dame Fighting Irish - 1929, 1930

- Knute Rockne Memorial Trophy - Dickinson System National Champions

Notre Dame Fighting Irish - 1938

- Litkenhous Trophy - Litkenhous Ratings National Champions

Notre Dame Fighting Irish - 1943, 1946, 1949, 1953

- MacArthur Bowl - NFF National Champions

Notre Dame Fighting Irish - 1964, 1966‡, 1973, 1977, 1988

‡ - co-champions with Michigan State

- Howard Jones Memorial Trophy — National Champions

Notre Dame Fighting Irish - 1964, 1966‡

‡ - co-champions with Michigan State

- Grantland Rice Trophy - FWAA National Champions

Notre Dame Fighting Irish – 1966, 1973, 1977, 1988

- ACFF Trophy – Association of College Football Fans national champions

Notre Dame Fighting Irish – 1993

- The Joe Moore Award

Notre Dame Fighting Irish – 2017

=== Distinctions ===
- As of 2023, Notre Dame has the fourth-highest winning percentage in NCAA Division I FBS (I-A) history (.730) (minimum 100 games of football).
- As of 2023, Notre Dame has produced the most players drafted into the National Football League of any program in the country. As of the 2023 NFL draft, 532 players have been drafted.
- As of 2023, Notre Dame is fourth in wins among Division I-A/FBS programs (948), trailing Ohio State (964), Alabama (965), and Michigan (1004).
- As of 2023, Notre Dame has the second-fewest losses (338) of any NCAA Division I program that has been playing football for more than 100 years, behind Alabama (337).
- As of 2023, Notre Dame has had 112 winning seasons in 137 years of football and only 15 losing seasons (including the record for the 2012-2013 season, whose wins were retroactively stripped by the NCAA).
- Notre Dame is one of three football programs with at least seven individual Heisman Trophy winners (shares the distinction with Oklahoma (seven), and USC (eight); Ohio State has seven Heisman Trophies that were won by six players).
- As of 2014, Notre Dame has produced more 1st Team All-Americans (188), consensus All-Americans (81 players on 99 selections) and unanimous All-Americans (33) in football than any other college program.
- Notre Dame is represented by 50 players and coaches in the College Football Hall of Fame, the most of any university.
- 12 former players are in the Pro Football Hall of Fame, tied with USC.
- Helped by its status as a highly regarded academic institution (ranked 19th by US News & World Report), Notre Dame is second only to Nebraska in Academic All-Americans (66).
- Notre Dame holds the NCAA record for Most consecutive wins over one opponent, beating the US Naval Academy (USNA) 43 times in a row before falling to them in 2007.
- The football program also ended the Oklahoma Sooners' NCAA record winning streak of 47 games in 1957. Coincidentally, Oklahoma's 28–21 loss to Notre Dame to open the 1953 season was the last loss before the beginning of the streak.
- Notre Dame has had 13 undefeated seasons and 11 others with at most one loss or tie.
- Notre Dame is 3–3–1 in games where the national title winners from the previous two years have met in a regular season game. There have only been 13 of these games played in college football history. Notre Dame has played in 7 of the 13 games:
  - 1945 – Army def. Notre Dame 48–0
  - 1947 – Notre Dame def. Army 27–7
  - 1968 – Notre Dame tied USC 21–21
  - 1974 – USC def. Notre Dame 55–24
  - 1978 – Notre Dame def. Pitt 26–17
  - 1989 – Miami def. Notre Dame 27–10
  - 1990 – Notre Dame def. Miami 29–20
- Notre Dame is one of only two Catholic universities that field a team in the Football Bowl Subdivision, the other being Boston College. This distinction has resulted in what some have termed the Holy War rivalry.

=== No. 1 vs. No. 2 ===
Notre Dame has participated in eleven "No. 1 vs No. 2" matchups since the AP poll began in 1936. They have a record of 5–3–2 in such games, with a 4–1–1 record as the No. 1 team in such matchups. Those games include:

Date	No. 1 Team	No. 2 Team	Outcome
October 9, 1943	Notre Dame	Michigan	W 35–14
November 20, 1943	Notre Dame	Iowa Pre-Flight	W 14–13
November 10, 1945	Army	Notre Dame	L 0–48
November 9, 1946	Army	Notre Dame	T 0–0
November 19, 1966	Notre Dame	Michigan State	T 10–10
September 28, 1968	Purdue	Notre Dame	L 22–37
November 26, 1988	Notre Dame	Southern California	W 27–10
September 16, 1989	Notre Dame	Michigan	W 24–19
November 13, 1993	Florida State	Notre Dame	W 31–24
January 7, 2013	Notre Dame	Alabama	L 14–42

=== Historic games ===
Notre Dame has played in many regular season games that have been widely regarded by both the media and sports historians as historic or famous games. Notre Dame has played in many games labeled "Game of the Century" as well as several No. 1 vs No. 2 matchups.

- 1913 Notre Dame vs. Army ("The Forward Pass")
- 1935 Notre Dame vs. Ohio State ("Game of the Century")
- 1946 Army vs. Notre Dame ("Game of the Century")
- 1957 Notre Dame vs. Oklahoma (end of Oklahoma's NCAA record 47 game win streak)
- 1966 Notre Dame vs. Michigan St. ("Game of the Century")
- 1988 Notre Dame vs. Miami ("Catholics vs. Convicts")
- 1993 Florida St. vs. Notre Dame ("Game of the Century")
- 2005 USC vs. Notre Dame ("Bush Push" game)
- 2007 Navy vs. Notre Dame (Navy ends 43-year losing streak to Notre Dame, the longest in NCAA history between annual opponents)

Notre Dame has also played in several bowl games considered by many sportswriters to be among the best bowl games played:

- 1970 Cotton Bowl Classic vs. Texas
- 1973 Sugar Bowl vs. Alabama
- 1979 Cotton Bowl Classic vs. Houston ("Chicken Soup Game")

== All-time records ==
=== Season records ===
Notre Dame's all-time record after the 2023 season stands at 948 wins, 338 losses, and 42 ties.

=== In-state NCAA Division I record ===
Team	Record	Percentage	Streak	First meeting	Last meeting
Ball State	1–0	1.000	Won 1	2018	2018
Indiana	24–5–1	.817	Won 7	1898	2024
Indiana State	0–0	–	–	–	–
Purdue	60–26–2	.693	Won 9	1896	2026
Valparaiso	1–0	1.000	Won 1	1920	1920
Overall Record			86–31–3		

=== Head coaches ===
Years	Coach	Seasons	Record	Pct.
1887–1889, 1892–1893	None	5	7–4–1	.625
1894	James L. Morrison	1	3–1–1	.700
1895	H.G. Hadden	1	3–1	.750
1896–1898	Frank E. Hering	3	12–6–1	.658
1899	James McWeeney	1	6–3–1	.650
1900–1901	Pat O'Dea	2	14–4–2	.750
1902–1903	James F. Faragher	2	14–2–2	.843
1904	Red Salmon	1	5–3	.625
1905	Henry J. McGlew	1	5–4	.556
1906–1907	Thomas A. Barry	2	12–1–1	.893
1908	Victor M. Place	1	8–1	.889
1909–1910	Shorty Longman	2	11–1–2	.857
1911–1912	Jack Marks	2	13–0–2	.933
1913–1917	Jesse Harper	5	34–5–1	.863
1918–1930	Knute Rockne	13	105–12–5	.881
1931–1933	Hunk Anderson	3	16–9–2	.630
1934–1940	Elmer Layden	7	47–13–3	.770
1941–1943, 1946–1953	Frank Leahy	11	87–11–9	.855
1944	Ed McKeever	1	8–2	.800
1945, 1963	Hugh Devore	2	9–9–1	.500
1954–1958	Terry Brennan	5	32–18	.640
1959–1962	Joe Kuharich	4	17–23	.425
1964–1974	Ara Parseghian	11	95–17–4	.836
1975–1980	Dan Devine	6	53–16–1	.764
1981–1985	Gerry Faust	5	30–26–1	.535
1986–1996	Lou Holtz	11	100–30–2	.765
1997–2001	Bob Davie	5	35–25	.583
2001†	George O'Leary	0	0–0	–
2002–2004	Tyrone Willingham	3	21–15	.583
2004‡	Kent Baer	0	0–1	.000
2005–2009	Charlie Weis	5	35–27	.565
2010–2021	Brian Kelly	12	92–40	.697
2021–present	Marcus Freeman	4	43-12	.782

† George O'Leary did not coach a single practice or game, resigning five days after being hired for misrepresenting his academic credentials.
‡ Kent Baer served as interim head coach for one game at the 2004 Insight Bowl after Tyrone Willingham was fired.

=== Bowl games ===
Notre Dame has made 45 bowl game appearances, winning 23 and losing 21, with one game vacated. After an initial appearance in a postseason contest in the 1925 Rose Bowl, the Fighting Irish refused to participate in bowl games for more than four decades; Sports Illustrated's Dan Jenkins speculated that Notre Dame might have gone to as many as twenty bowl games during the self-imposed forty-five-year hiatus. From 1994 to the 2006 football seasons, Notre Dame lost 9 consecutive bowl games, tied with Northwestern for the most in NCAA history. That streak ended with a 49–21 win over Hawaii in the 2008 Hawaii Bowl. In the process, Notre Dame scored its highest point total in postseason play. The record of 9 consecutive bowl losses was later tied by Northwestern in 2011, then that streak was snapped a year later. The Fighting Irish suffered in a multi-decade skid with an 0-8 record in BCS/Playoff games and an 0-10 record in major bowl games between 1994 and 2025. The losing streak would come to an end when Notre Dame beat Georgia in the 2025 Sugar Bowl. As of 2024, Notre Dame has said they will not list CFP first round games under their bowl games. They will "have two sub-categories: bowl record and playoff record, with the latter including CFP first-round games. Bowl games played in the quarterfinals and semifinals of the CFP would count toward both records."

Date	Bowl	Opponent	Result
January 1, 1925	Rose Bowl	Stanford	W 27–10
January 1, 1970	Cotton Bowl Classic	No. 1 Texas	L 17–21
January 1, 1971	Cotton Bowl Classic	No. 1 Texas	W 24–11
January 1, 1973	Orange Bowl	No. 9 Nebraska	L 6–40
December 31, 1973	Sugar Bowl	No. 1 Alabama	W 24–23
January 1, 1975	Orange Bowl	No. 2 Alabama	W 13–11
December 27, 1976	Gator Bowl	No. 20 Penn State	W 20–9
January 2, 1978	Cotton Bowl Classic	No. 1 Texas	W 38–10
January 1, 1979	Cotton Bowl Classic	No. 9 Houston	W 35–34
January 1, 1981	Sugar Bowl	No. 1 Georgia	L 10–17
December 29, 1983	Liberty Bowl	No. 13 Boston College	W 19–18
December 29, 1984	Aloha Bowl	No. 10 SMU	L 20–27
January 1, 1988	Cotton Bowl Classic	No. 8 Texas A&M	L 10–35
January 2, 1989	Fiesta Bowl	No. 3 West Virginia	W 34–21
January 1, 1990	Orange Bowl	No. 1 Colorado	W 21–6
January 1, 1991	Orange Bowl	No. 1 Colorado	L 9–10
January 1, 1992	Sugar Bowl	No. 3 Florida	W 39–28
January 1, 1993	Cotton Bowl Classic	No. 3 Texas A&M	W 28–3
January 1, 1994	Cotton Bowl Classic	No. 6 Texas A&M	W 24–21
January 2, 1995	Fiesta Bowl	No. 5 Colorado	L 24–41
January 1, 1996	Orange Bowl	No. 8 Florida State	L 26–31
December 28, 1997	Independence Bowl	No. 15 LSU	L 9–27
January 1, 1999	Gator Bowl	No. 12 Georgia Tech	L 28–35
January 1, 2001	Fiesta Bowl	No. 5 Oregon State	L 9–41
January 1, 2003	Gator Bowl	No. 17 North Carolina State	L 6–28
December 28, 2004	Insight Bowl	Oregon State	L 21–38
January 2, 2006	Fiesta Bowl	No. 4 Ohio State	L 20–34
January 3, 2007	Sugar Bowl	No. 4 LSU	L 14–41
December 24, 2008	Hawaii Bowl	Hawaii	W 49–21
December 31, 2010	Sun Bowl	Miami (FL)	W 33–17
December 29, 2011	Champs Sports Bowl	No. 25 Florida State	L 14–18
January 7, 2013	BCS National Championship (vacated)	No. 2 Alabama	L 14–42
December 28, 2013	Pinstripe Bowl (vacated)	Rutgers	W 29–16
December 30, 2014	Music City Bowl	No. 23 LSU	W 31–28
January 1, 2016	Fiesta Bowl	No. 7 Ohio State	L 28–44
January 1, 2018	Citrus Bowl	No. 17 LSU	W 21–17
December 29, 2018	Cotton Bowl Classic (CFP Semifinal)	No. 2 Clemson	L 3–30
December 28, 2019	Camping World Bowl	Iowa State	W 33–9
January 1, 2021	Rose Bowl (CFP Semifinal)	No. 1 Alabama	L 14–31
January 1, 2022	Fiesta Bowl	No. 9 Oklahoma State	L 35–37
December 30, 2022	Gator Bowl	No. 19 South Carolina	W 45–38
December 29, 2023	Sun Bowl	No. 19 Oregon State	W 40–8
January 2, 2025	Sugar Bowl (CFP Quarterfinal)	No. 2 Georgia	W 23–10
January 9, 2025	Orange Bowl (CFP Semifinal)	No. 4 Penn State	W 27–24
January 20, 2025	CFP National Championship	No. 6 Ohio State	L 23–34

=== Shamrock Series ===
Between 2009 and 2016, and resuming again in 2018, Notre Dame has hosted an annual off-site home football game known as the Shamrock Series. The series promotes Notre Dame's athletic and academic brand, and has brought the Fighting Irish to San Antonio, New York, Greater Washington, D.C., Chicago, Indianapolis, Boston and the Dallas–Fort Worth metroplex. Each game in the series also features a unique alternate uniform for the Notre Dame team. Notre Dame has yet to lose a game in the Shamrock Series with a record of 11–0 (including the later-vacated win over Arizona State in the 2013 season).

Prior to the 2012 season, Notre Dame Athletic Director Jack Swarbrick announced at a news conference of plans to continue the series through 2016. He confirmed after his news conference that New York is expected to fall in that rotation and then continue to be the one consistently repeating venue for Shamrock Series games. While the Shamrock Series was not held in 2017 or 2023, Notre Dame still featured a unique alternate uniform at one game each of those years, both times against Navy (at Notre Dame in 2017 and in Dublin, Ireland in 2023).

The Shamrock Series includes academic and other non-football activities in the host city in the days and hours leading up to the game, which include pep rallies, drummers' circles, and academic lectures.

The Shamrock Series held in Las Vegas in 2022 was the largest crowd for a college athletic event in Nevada history.

Season	Date	Opponent		Notre Dame		Stadium	Location	Attendance	TV
2009	October 31	Washington State	14	25 Notre Dame	40	Alamodome	San Antonio, Texas	53,407	NBC
2010	November 20	Army	3	Notre Dame	27	Yankee Stadium	The Bronx, New York	54,251	NBC
2011	November 12	Maryland	21	Notre Dame	45	FedEx Field	Landover, Maryland	70,251	NBC
2012	October 6	Miami (FL)	3	Notre Dame	41 (Note: Vacated)	Soldier Field	Chicago, Illinois	62,871	NBC
2013	October 5	22 Arizona State	34	Notre Dame	37	AT&T Stadium	Arlington, Texas	66,690	NBC
2014	September 13	Purdue	14	11 Notre Dame	30	Lucas Oil Stadium	Indianapolis, Indiana	56,832	NBC
2015	November 21	Boston College	16	5 Notre Dame	19	Fenway Park	Boston, Massachusetts	56,832	NBCSN
2016	November 12	Army	6	Notre Dame	44	Alamodome	San Antonio, Texas	45,762	NBC
2018	November 17	12 Syracuse	3	3 Notre Dame	36	Yankee Stadium	The Bronx, New York	48,104	NBC
2020	Canceled due to COVID-19 pandemic (Note: Notre Dame was scheduled to play Wisconsin on October 3 at Lambeau Field in Green Bay, WI.)								
2021	September 25	18 Wisconsin	13	12 Notre Dame	41	Soldier Field	Chicago, Illinois	59,571	Fox
2022	October 8	16 BYU	20	Notre Dame	28	Allegiant Stadium	Las Vegas, Nevada	62,742	NBC
2024	November 23	19 Army	14	6 Notre Dame	49	Yankee Stadium	The Bronx, New York	47,342	NBC
2026	September 6	Wisconsin	13	4 Notre Dame	41	Lambeau Field	Green Bay, Wisconsin	75,939	NBC
Notre Dame overall record: 11–0

== Players and coaches ==
=== Heisman Trophy ===
Seven Notre Dame football players have won the Heisman Trophy, which ties them with the University of Oklahoma for the second most by any university. (Ohio State also has seven trophies that were won by only six players, while USC has the most winners with eight).

Heisman Trophy Winners
Year	Name	Position
1943	Angelo Bertelli	QB
1947	Johnny Lujack	QB
1949	Leon Hart	End
1953	Johnny Lattner	HB
1956	Paul Hornung	QB
1964	John Huarte	QB
1987	Tim Brown	WR

Heisman voting:

- 1938 – Whitney Beinor, 9th
- 1943 – Angelo Bertelli, 1st, Creighton Miller, 4th, Jim White, 9th
- 1944 – Bob Kelly, 6th
- 1945 – Frank Dancewicz, 6th
- 1946 - Johnny Lujack, 3rd
- 1947 – Johnny Lujack, 1st
- 1949 – Leon Hart, 1st, Bob Williams, 5th, Emil Sitko, 8th
- 1950 – Bob Williams, 6th
- 1953 – Johnny Lattner, 1st
- 1954 – Ralph Guglielmi, 4th
- 1956 – Paul Hornung, 1st
- 1958 – Nick Pietrosante, 10th
- 1959 – Monty Stickles, 9th
- 1964 – John Huarte, 1st, Jack Snow, 5th
- 1965 – Bill Wolski, 11th
- 1966 – Nick Eddy, 3rd, Terry Hanratty, 6th
- 1967 – Terry Hanratty, 9th
- 1968 – Terry Hanratty, 3rd
- 1969 – Mike McCoy, 6th
- 1970 – Joe Theismann, 2nd
- 1971 – Walt Patulski, 9th
- 1974 – Tom Clements, 4th
- 1975 – Steve Niehaus, 12th
- 1977 – Ken MacAfee, 3rd, Ross Browner, 5th
- 1979 – Vagas Ferguson, 5th
- 1983 – Allen Pinkett, 16th
- 1985 – Allen Pinkett, 8th
- 1987 – Tim Brown, 1st
- 1989 – Tony Rice, 4th, Raghib Ismail, tie 10th
- 1990 – Raghib Ismail, 2nd
- 1992 – Reggie Brooks, 5th
- 2005 – Brady Quinn, 4th
- 2006 – Brady Quinn, 3rd
- 2009 – Golden Tate, 10th
- 2012 – Manti Te'o, 2nd
- 2020 – Ian Book, 9th
- 2025 – Jeremiyah Love, 3rd

=== Other national award winners ===
- Maxwell Award

Leon Hart – 1949
Johnny Lattner – 1952, 1953
Jim Lynch – 1966
Ross Browner – 1977
Brady Quinn – 2006
Manti Te'o – 2012

- Walter Camp Award

Ken MacAfee – 1977
Tim Brown – 1987
Raghib Ismail – 1990
Manti Te'o – 2012

- Johnny Unitas Golden Arm Award

Tony Rice – 1989
Brady Quinn – 2006

- Sammy Baugh Trophy

Terry Hanratty – 1967
Brady Quinn – 2005

- Doak Walker Award

Jeremiyah Love – 2025

- Biletnikoff Award

Golden Tate – 2009

- John Mackey Award

Tyler Eifert – 2012

- Dick Butkus Award

Manti Te'o – 2012
Jaylon Smith – 2015
Jeremiah Owusu-Koramoah – 2020

- Chuck Bednarik Award

Manti Te'o – 2012

- Ozzie Newsome Award

Tyler Eifert – 2011

- Lombardi Award

Walt Patulski – 1971
Ross Browner – 1977
Chris Zorich – 1990
Aaron Taylor – 1993
Manti Te'o – 2012

- Lott IMPACT Trophy

Manti Te'o – 2012

- Bronko Nagurski Trophy

Manti Te'o – 2012
Xavier Watts – 2023

- Outland Trophy

George Connor – 1946
Bill Fischer – 1948
Ross Browner – 1976

- AT&T ESPN All-America Player

Brady Quinn – 2006

- The Jim Parker Trophy

Aaron Taylor – 1993

- The Jack Tatum Trophy

Bobby Taylor – 1994

- Chic Harley Award

Paul Hornung – 1956

- The Kellen Moore Award

Rick Mirer – 1992

- Polynesian Player of the Year Award

Ronnie Stanley – 2015

- Wuerffel Trophy

Drue Tranquill – 2018

- Disney's Wide World of Sports Spirit Award

Jeremiyah Love – 2025

=== Coaching awards ===
- Paul "Bear" Bryant Award

Ara Parseghian – 1964
Lou Holtz – 1988

- Eddie Robinson Coach of the Year Award

Ara Parseghian – 1964
Lou Holtz – 1988
Charlie Weis – 2005
Brian Kelly – 2012

- Home Depot Coach of the Year Award

Tyrone Willingham – 2002
Brian Kelly – 2012, 2018

- Walter Camp Coach of the Year Award

Brian Kelly – 2012

- Liberty Mutual Coach of the Year Award

Brian Kelly – 2012

- Associated Press Coach of the Year Award

Brian Kelly – 2012

- Sporting News Coach of the Year

Ara Parseghian – 1966
Lou Holtz – 1988
Brian Kelly – 2012

- George Munger Award

Tyrone Willingham – 2002
Marcus Freeman – 2024

- The Woody Hayes Trophy

Lou Holtz – 1988

- Broyles Award

Bob Diaco – 2012
Al Golden – 2024

=== Team awards ===
- Grantland Rice Trophy

Notre Dame Fighting Irish – 1966, 1973, 1977, 1988

- Joe Moore Award

Notre Dame Fighting Irish – 2017

=== College Football Hall of Fame ===
50 former Notre Dame players and 6 coaches have been inducted into the College Football Hall of Fame, located in Atlanta, Georgia. Notre Dame leads all universities in players inducted.

Name	Position	Year inducted
Hunk Anderson	G	1974
Angelo Bertelli	QB	1972
Tim Brown	WR	2009
Ross Browner	DE	1999
Jack Cannon	G	1965
Frank Carideo	QB	1954
Dave Casper	TE	2012
George Connor	T	1963
Bob Crable	LB	2017
Jim Crowley	HB	1966
Zygmont Czarobski	T	1977
Dan Devine	Coach	1985
Bob Dove	End	2000
Ray Eichenlaub	FB	1972
Bill Fischer	T/G	1983
Thom Gatewood	End	2015
George Gipp	HB	1951
Jerry Groom	C	1994
Ralph Guglielmi	QB	2001
Jesse Harper	Coach	1994
Leon Hart	End	1973
Frank "Nordy" Hoffman	G	1978
Lou Holtz	Coach	2008
Paul Hornung	QB	1985
John Huarte	QB	2005
Rocket Ismail	KR/WR	2019
Johnny Lattner	HB	1979
Elmer Layden	FB	1951
Frank Leahy	Coach	1970
Johnny Lujack	QB	1960
Jim Lynch	LB	1992
Ken MacAfee	TE	1997
Jim Martin	End/T	1995
Bert Metzger	G	1982
Creighton Miller	HB	1976
Don Miller	HB	1970
Edgar Miller	T	1966
Fred Miller	T	1985
Wayne Millner	End	1990
Alan Page	DE	1993
Ara Parseghian	Coach	1980
Knute Rockne	Coach	1951
Louis J. Salmon	FB	1971
Marchmont Schwartz	HB	1974
William Shakespeare	HB	1983
Emil Sitko	HB/FB	1984
Clipper Smith	G	1975
Mike Stonebreaker	LB	2023
Harry Stuhldreher	QB	1958
Aaron Taylor	T	2021
Joe Theismann	QB	2003
Adam Walsh	C	1968
Bob Williams	QB	1988
Tommy Yarr	C	1987
Chris Zorich	DT	2007

== Uniforms ==
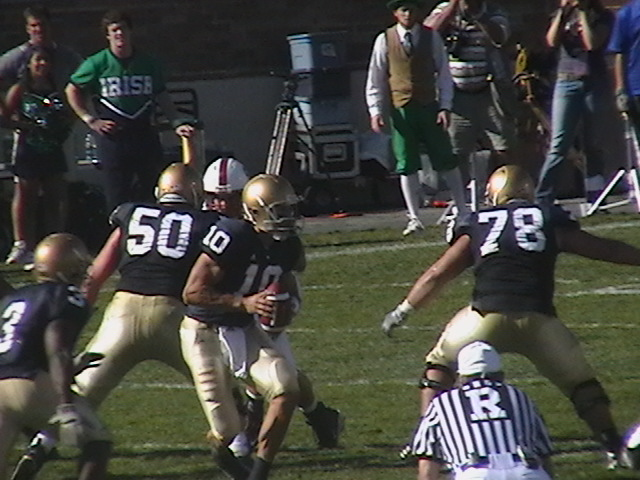
The team in home uniforms from 2005-09

Notre Dame's home jersey is navy blue with white numerals, gold outlining, and a small interlocking "ND" logo on each sleeve. The away jersey is white with navy numerals, gold outlining, and the interlocking "ND" on the sleeves. These uniforms were introduced by Lou Holtz in 1986 and retained during the tenures of Bob Davie (1997-2001) and Tyrone Willingham (2002–04). In 2005, Charlie Weis removed the interlocking "ND" from the sleeves, replacing it with the player's number, the first time the Irish had worn "TV numbers" since 1986, when they were located on the shoulders. These jerseys remained throughout Weis' tenure. When Brian Kelly succeeded Weis in 2010, the interlocking "ND" returned to the sleeves, and it has remained since.

The Irish traditionally have not worn player names on their jerseys during regular season games, but they were included during the coaching tenures of Dan Devine (1975–80) and Gerry Faust (1981-85). When Notre Dame appeared in the 1970 Cotton Bowl Classic, its first bowl game in 45 years, Ara Parseghian had player names placed on the backs of the jerseys, a tradition which was retained for four other bowl appearances under Parseghian. Holtz, Davie, Willingham and Weis (in the 2006 Fiesta Bowl and 2007 Sugar Bowl) did not adhere to this tradition for bowl games they coached, but it returned under Weis for the 2008 Hawaii Bowl and has been continued by Kelly and Marcus Freeman.

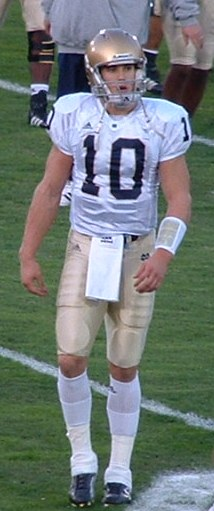
Former quarterback Brady Quinn in the away jersey worn from 2005-09

Notre Dame's helmets are solid gold with gray facemasks, the gold being emblematic of the University's administration building's "Golden Dome". Notre Dame's tradition for the team's student managers to spray-paint the team's helmets prior to each game ended in 2011 when the football equipment staff, along with Notre Dame Athletics Director Jack Swarbrick and head coach Brian Kelly outsourced the painting process to Hydro Graphics Inc.

During Gerry Faust's tenure (1981–85), Notre Dame's blue jerseys switched from the traditional navy (although Notre Dame wore green jerseys full-time between the 1977 game vs. USC and the end of the 1980 season) to royal blue with gold and white stripes on the sleeves. The navy blue jerseys returned for the 1984 season and have continued through the 2024 season.

No uniform numbers have been retired by Notre Dame. Upon being issued a number, each player is given a card that lists some of the more famous players who have worn that particular number. An examples is number 3, which was worn by Ralph Guglielmi, George Izo, Daryle Lamonica, Coley O'Brien, Joe Montana, Michael Floyd, Rick Mirer and Ron Powlus, among others. Number 5 is also notable, as it is the only number to be worn by one of the so-called "Four Horsemen" (Elmer Layden), a Heisman Trophy winner (Paul Hornung), and a national championship-winning quarterback (Terry Hanratty). Number 7 has been worn by such Irish greats as 1964 Heisman Trophy winner John Huarte, 1970 Heisman runner-up Joe Theismann, Steve Beuerlein, Jimmy Clausen, and Jarious Jackson.

In 2011, both Michigan and Notre Dame wore throwback uniforms in their game against each other. For each Shamrock Series game, Notre Dame wears specially designed helmets, jerseys, and pants.

Champion supplied football jerseys for Notre Dame for over 50 years until the Irish switched to Adidas in 2001. On July 1, 2014, the Notre Dame athletic department began wearing uniforms and footwear supplied by Under Armour.

=== Green jerseys ===
Over the years, Notre Dame has occasionally worn green instead of blue as its home jersey, sometimes adopting the jersey for an entire season – or more – at a time. Notre Dame is confirmed to have worn green as far back as 1926 against Penn State, and in 1942 they officially became an alternate color for the team.

Currently, Notre Dame reserves its green jerseys for special occasions. Sometimes on such occasions, the Irish will take the field for warmups dressed in blue, only to switch to green when they go back to the locker room before kickoff. This tradition was started by Dan Devine in 1977 before the USC game. Notre Dame has also been known to switch jerseys at halftime, as during the 1985 USC game and in the loss to Nile Kinnick-led Iowa in 1939, although this was to help avoid confusion between their navy uniforms and Iowa's black ones. The current design of the jersey is kelly green with gold numbers and white outlining. For the 2006 Army game, Coach Charlie Weis broke out the green jerseys as a reward to his senior players and in an attempt to end the string of losses by the Irish when wearing green. Notre Dame wore throwback green jerseys in 2007 against USC in honor of the 30th anniversary of the 1977 National Championship team but lost the game 38-0. As of 2023, Notre Dame's record in green is 42-15-1, going back to 1975.

On October 4, 2025, the Irish paired green jerseys with green pants, defeating Boise State.

On at least one occasion (1992 Sugar Bowl) Notre Dame has worn an away variant of the jersey, a white jersey with green numbers.

== Facilities ==
=== Notre Dame Stadium ===
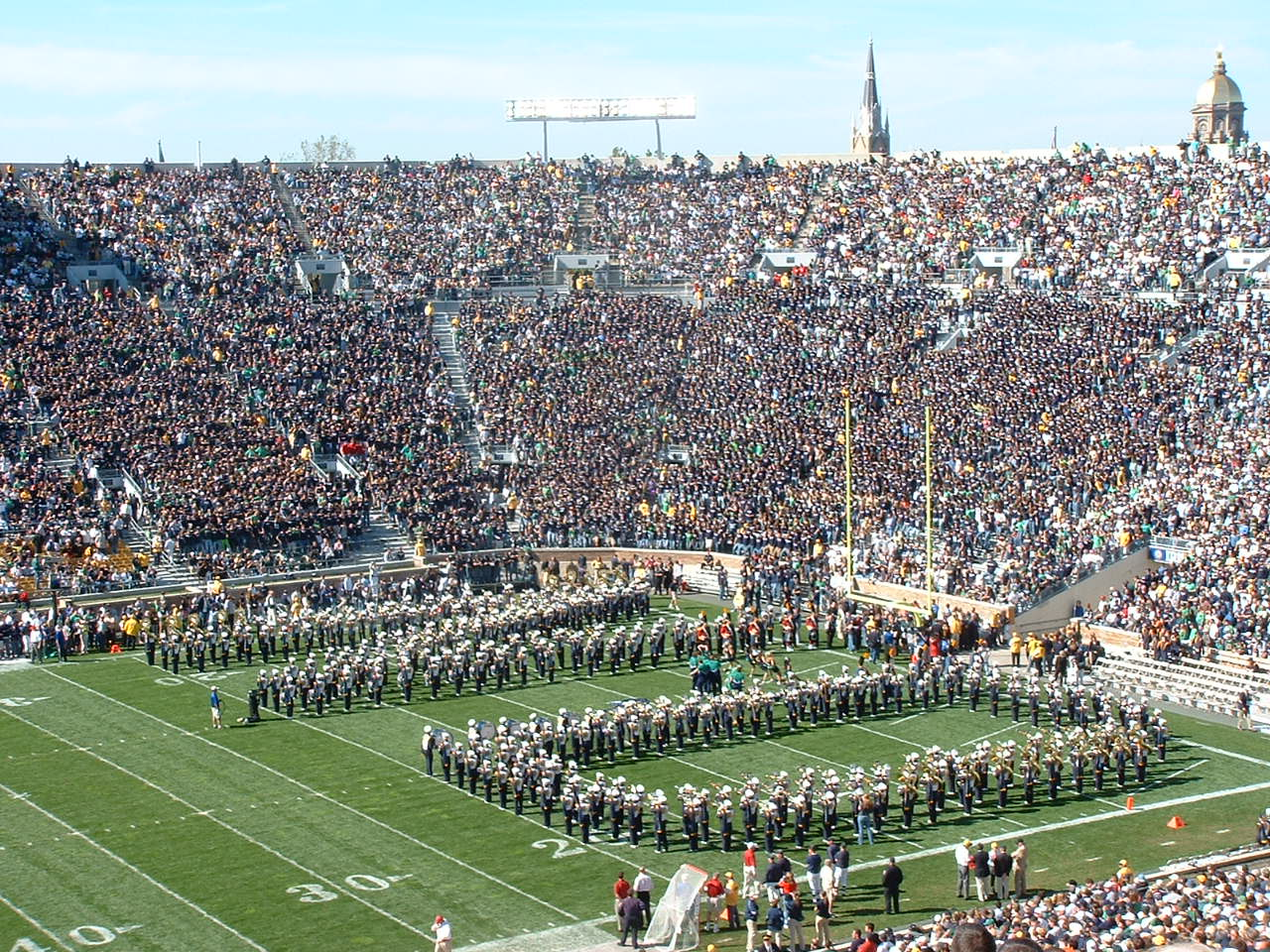
Notre Dame Stadium on game day, with student section and band

Notre Dame Stadium is the home football stadium for the University of Notre Dame Fighting Irish football team. Located on the southeast part of the university's campus in Notre Dame, Indiana and with a seating capacity of 77,622, Notre Dame Stadium is one of the most renowned venues in college football. The Sporting News ranks Notre Dame Stadium as #2 on its list of "College Football Cathedrals". and the stadium experience evokes a more traditional feel. Notre Dame Stadium is used for football-related activities and for Commencement (since 2010). Notre Dame Stadium had no permanent lighting until the expansion project in 1997. NBC paid for the lighting as they have televised all Notre Dame home football games since 1991. On April 12, 2014, it was announced during the annual Blue-Gold Spring Game that a FieldTurf synthetic surface would replace the grass field after the 2014 Commencement Weekend. In November 2014 the University of Notre Dame embarked on a $400 million stadium expansion called the Crossroads Campus Project, which was completed in time for the 2017 season.

=== Cartier Field ===
Cartier Field was the original playing field of the Fighting Irish. In 1930, it was replaced by Notre Dame Stadium, due to the growing popularity of ND football.

=== Guglielmino Athletics Complex ===
Known by fans as "The Gug" (pronounced "goog"), The Guglielmino Athletics Complex is Notre Dame's football headquarters. The Gug houses the offices for all team staff members, an auditorium, a weight room, a training room, the equipment room, the practice locker room, a brand new napping room, and various other spaces for the football team to utilize. The complex was underwritten by Don F. Guglielmino and his family.

=== Irish Athletic Center ===
The indoor practice facility has a synthetic turf field and a video board at midfield for replay and graphics. On the second level of the facility, there is a 1,600-square-foot recruiting lounge. In all, the facility totals 111,400 square feet, and the ceiling is 95 feet at its peak.

== Rivalries ==
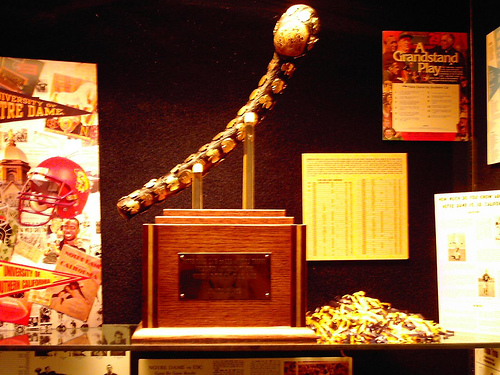
The first Jeweled Shillelagh, awarded to the winner of the annual USC vs. Notre Dame game

Notre Dame has rivalries with several universities. Although the Fighting Irish compete as an independent, they play a national schedule that includes annual or otherwise regularly scheduled rivalry games. Army, Boston College, Michigan, Michigan State, Navy, Northwestern, Pittsburgh, Purdue, Stanford, and USC are among Notre Dame's rivals.

=== USC ===
Notre Dame and USC have played yearly since 1926 other than a three-year pause during World War II and a one-year pause in 2020 due to the COVID-19 pandemic. The series will go on hiatus after the 2025 season. The series will resume in 2030, as part of a four-game home-and-home series to be played from 2030–2033.

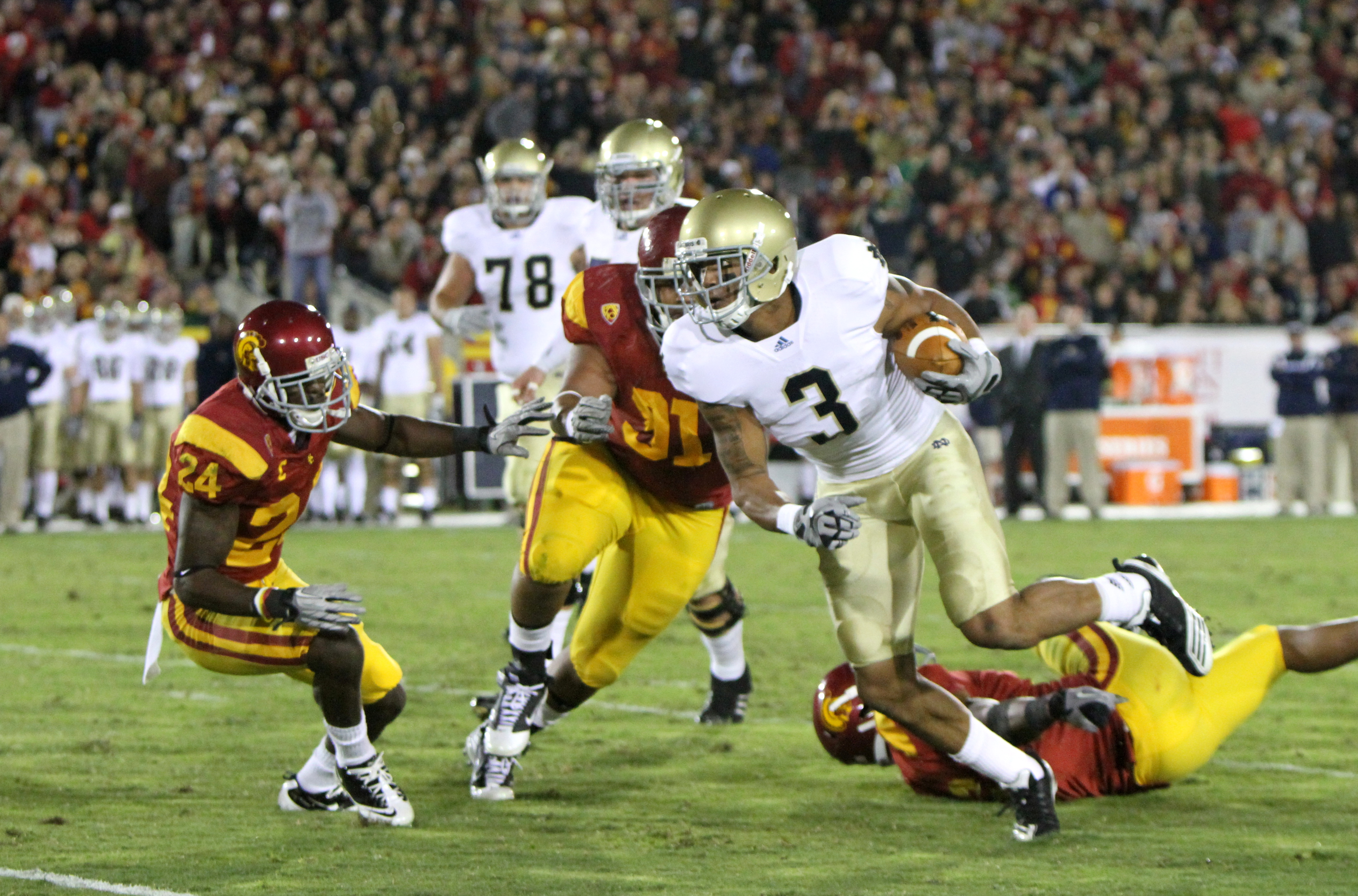
Notre Dame at USC (2010)

USC is Notre Dame's primary rival, and the schools compete annually for the Jeweled Shillelagh. The rivalry has produced 39 national championships, 15 Heisman Trophy winners, and 184 Consensus All-Americans through the 2021 season. It is considered one of the most prominent rivalries in college football, and has been called the greatest rivalry not dictated by conference affiliation or geography. Notable games in the series include the 1977 "Green Jersey" game and the 2005 "Bush Push" game. Through the 2025 season, Notre Dame leads the all-time series 51–37–5 and the trophy series 36–30–3.

=== Miami (FL) ===
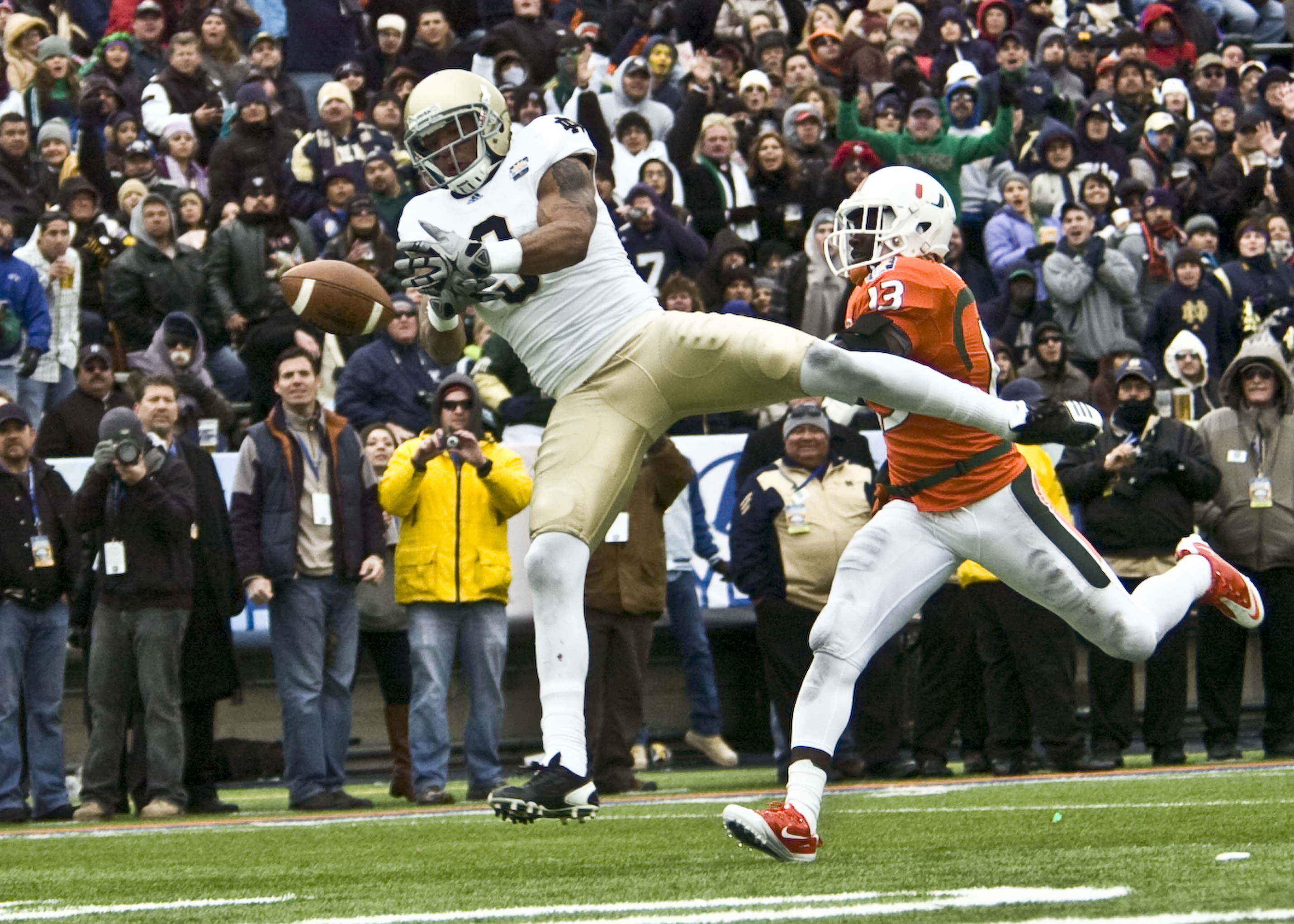
Michael Floyd battles a University of Miami defensive back for position during the 2010 Sun Bowl

Notre Dame and the Miami Hurricanes first met during the 1955 college football season. They met three times during the 1960s (1960, 1965, and 1967) and proceeded to play each other annually from 1971 to 1990 (except in 1986). Notre Dame consistently dominated the series in the 1970s, but in the 1980s, Miami began to dominate as the once docile rivalry intensified significantly. Both teams were national contenders in the later part of the decade, and both teams cost each other at least one national championship. Hostilities were fueled when the Hurricanes routed the Fighting Irish in the 1985 season finale 58–7, with Miami widely accused of running up the score in the second half. The rivalry gained national attention and both teams played their most famous games from 1988 to 1990. The game known as Catholics vs. Convicts in Indiana was won by the Fighting Irish 31–30. The following year, Miami ended Notre Dame's 23-game winning streak with a 27–10 victory. The rivalry ended after the Fighting Irish dashed #2 Miami's hopes for a repeat national championship with a 29–20 victory in Indiana.

The two teams met in the 2025 season opener at Hard Rock Stadium, with Miami winning 27-24. This win would prove to be decisive as the College Football Playoff Committee dictated that "The one metric we had to fall back on was the head to head. We charged the committee members to go back and watch that Miami-Notre Dame game" which allowed Miami to get into the 10th and final at large spot for the College Football Playoff, where they would go on to make it to the National Championship Game. This would prompt Leonard Moore to exclaim that the Irish were on a "revenge tour" in 2026, with Notre Dame taking down a then #1-seeded Miami 31-24.

They also will play each other in yet to be scheduled dates in the 2031, 2032, 2034, and 2037 seasons.

=== Michigan ===
The first meeting between Notre Dame and Michigan was in 1887, the first official football game in Notre Dame's history. The two schools have met 44 times in total, the latest matchup in 2019. Through the 2021 season, the two schools are both in the top five in all-time Division I winning percentage, with Notre Dame fourth and Michigan third. Michigan leads the series 25–18–1.

=== Michigan State ===
Meeting for the first time in 1897, Notre Dame and Michigan State play for the Megaphone Trophy. The two schools played in 64 out of 70 seasons from 1948 to 2017 but have not met since. Their next scheduled game is in 2026. Notable games in the series include the 1966 "Game of the Century". Through the 2023 season, Notre Dame leads the all-time series 48–28–1 and the trophy series 33–27–1.

=== Navy ===
Navy and Notre Dame played 93 games without interruption from 1927 to 2019. Notre Dame had a 43-game win streak during this time frame, the longest streak by one team over another in Division I-A football, which ended in 2007. While the 2020 contest was canceled due to the COVID-19 pandemic, the series resumed in 2021. Through the 2024 season, Notre Dame leads the series 83–13–1.

== Gameday traditions ==
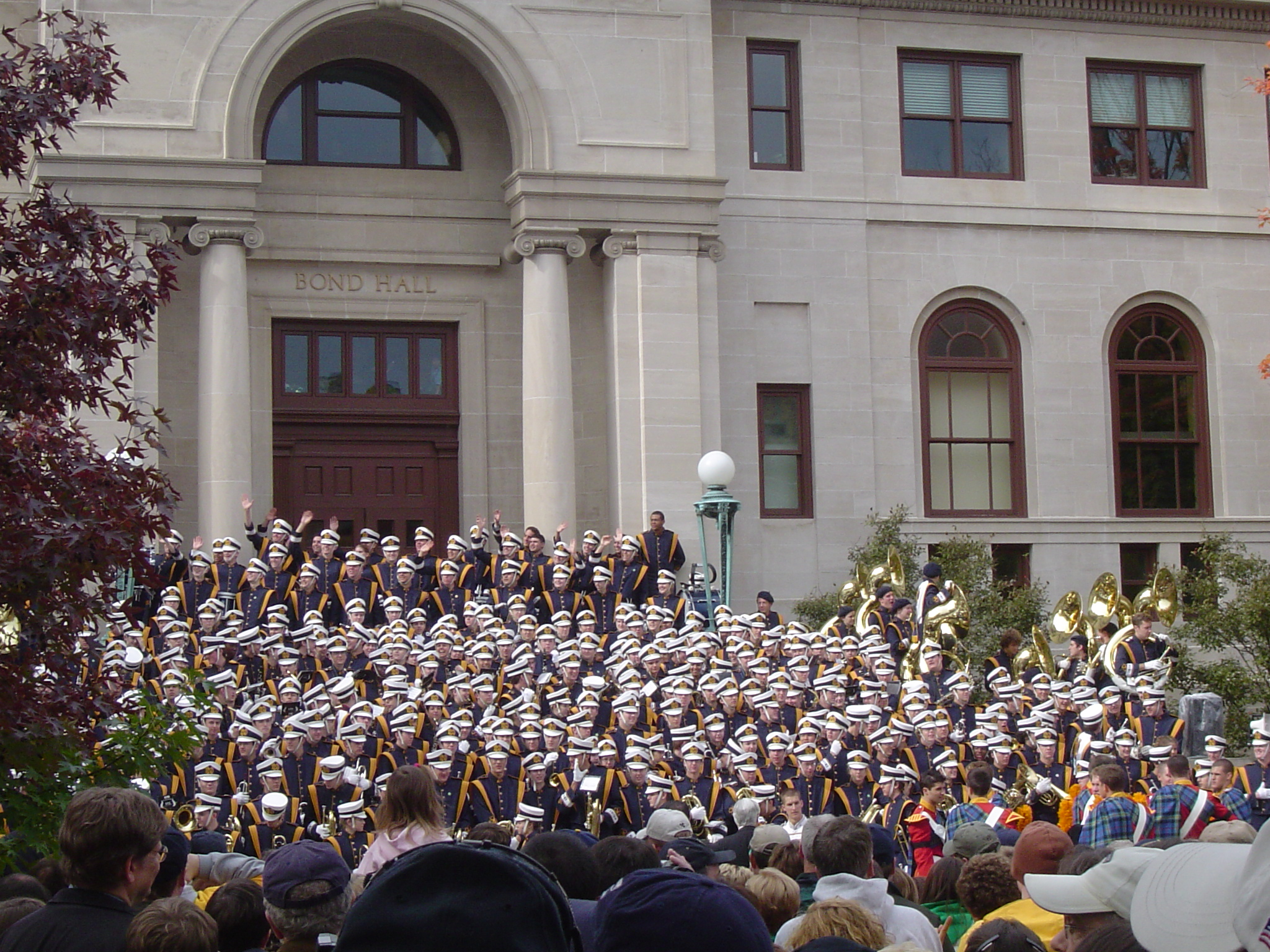
The band playing in a pre-game ceremony before a football game

Due to its long history, Fighting Irish football has a number of traditions unique to Notre Dame. Some of these are:

- The tradition of having 23.9 karat gold in the helmet paint continues, with the painting process provided by Hydro Graphics, Inc. and no longer by student managers. The gold particles that are used on the helmet were collected from the re-gilding on the Notre Dame dome in 2007. During the 2011 season, however, a new helmet paint scheme was introduced. While retaining the basic gold helmet and gray facemask look, the new gold is much more reflective than the old; there have already been several variations of this new "gold chrome" look, including brick and fish-scale texturing.
- Formerly, prior to the start of the game, the team attended Mass in semi-formal attire at the Sacred Heart Basilica. At the conclusion of Mass, fans formed a line that the team walked through from the chapel to the stadium. However, in 2011 the team changed its movements prior the game, instead taking buses back to Guglielmino Athletics Complex for final meetings. In 2013, Mass was moved to Friday night; as a result, the walk now originates from the Athletics complex. In 2022, Coach Freeman announced that the tradition of Mass before home games would return.

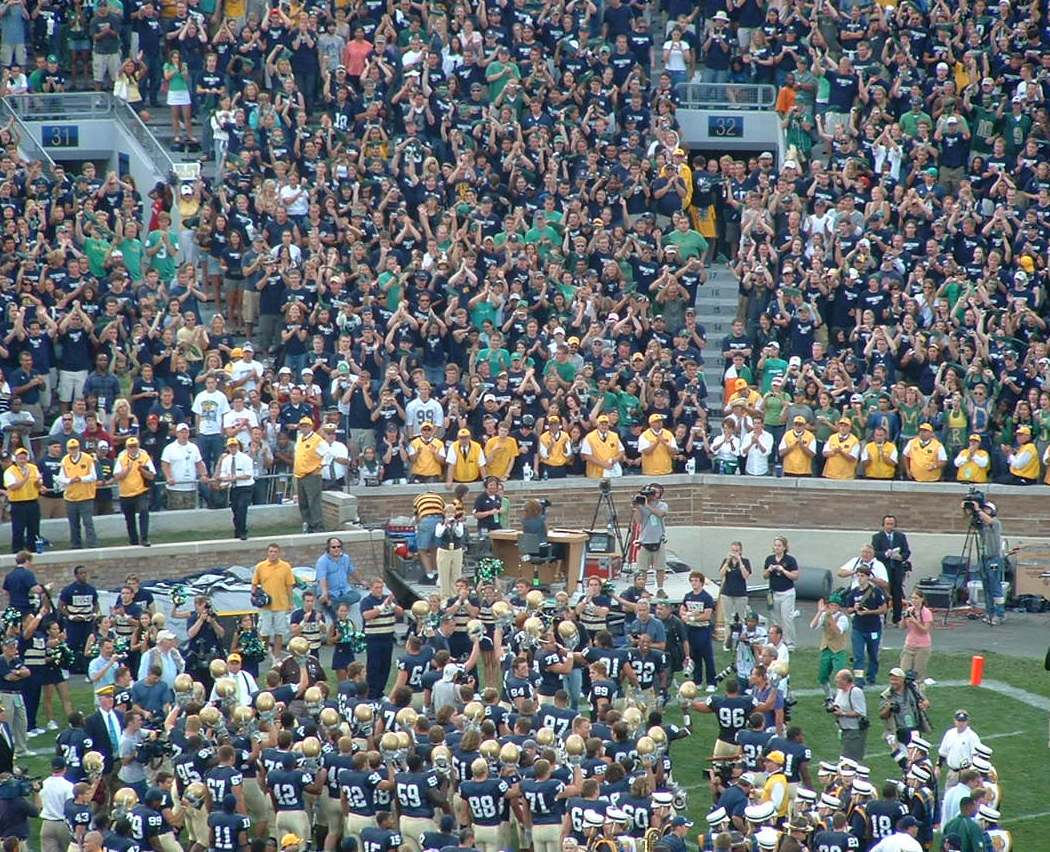
Team raising their helmets to the student section

- Earlier on game day, the Band of the Fighting Irish trumpet section plays Notre Dame, Our Mother & the Notre Dame victory march under the Golden Dome, with visitors standing at the bottom of the rotunda, and behind the band members on each upper floor.
- Coming out of the locker room, players slap the famous "Play Like a Champion Today" sign. This sign originated in 1986 when head coach Lou Holtz stumbled across a black and white photo of a similar sign and wanted one for his own players.
- Prior to the start of the game, with between 15 and 30 seconds left on the pregame clock, a clip of Cathy Richardson singing "Here Come The Irish" is played, followed up by I'm Shipping Up To Boston, which continues to play until the football is kicked off.
- Between the third and fourth quarters of home games, the Notre Dame Marching Band plays the finale to the 1812 Overture, as the crowd reacts with a synchronized waving of arms, with their fingers in the shape of the current coach's first initial. As of 2023, this is an "F" for Marcus Freeman.
- Starting in 1960, Sergeant Tim McCarthy of the Indiana State Police read a driving safety announcement to the crowd during the fourth quarter. When Sergeant McCarthy began his announcement, the crowd went silent to hear his message, which invariably ended with a pun. Sergeant McCarthy retired from this duty in the 2015 season after 55 years of fan-favorite messages. He was honored on the field on September 26, 2015, to deliver his last in-person address in which he repeated the same announcement he did on his first gameday. He died on October 1, 2020.
- At the conclusion of every home game, the team turns to the student section to salute them by raising their helmets in the air. They do this after a win or after a loss. Then, the band plays the Alma Mater, "Notre Dame, Our Mother". Those who stay link arms and sing the lyrics.

== Irish in the NFL ==
Since the NFL began drafting players in 1936, 495 Notre Dame football players have been selected by NFL teams. Additionally, Notre Dame has had 65 players selected in the first round of the NFL draft, including five overall number one picks. Of the 46 Super Bowls competed, as of 2012, only 14 teams have won the event without an Irish player on the roster. Looking at both participating team rosters, there have only been five Super Bowls that did not feature at least one former Notre Dame player on either team's roster – Denver vs. Atlanta, 1999; Dallas vs. Buffalo, 1994; Washington vs. Denver, 1988; Dallas vs. Denver, 1978; and Baltimore vs. Dallas, 1971. Eleven former players have won multiple Super Bowls: Mark Bavaro, Rocky Bleier, Nick Buoniconti, Eric Dorsey, Dave Duerson, David Givens, Terry Hanratty, Bob Kuechenberg, Joe Montana, Steve Sylvester and Justin Tuck.

=== Pro Football Hall of Fame ===
13 former Notre Dame players, plus 1 non-player alumnus, have been inducted into the Pro Football Hall of Fame, tying it for first with USC among all college football programs.

- 1963: Curly Lambeau – Green Bay Packers (1919–1949), Chicago Cardinals (1950–1951), Washington Redskins (1952–1953).
- 1963: Johnny Blood* – Milwaukee Badgers (1925–1926), Duluth Eskimos (1926–1927), Pottsville Maroons (1928), Green Bay Packers (1929–1933, 1935–1936), Pittsburgh Pirates (1934, 1937–1938).
- 1964: George Trafton – Decatur Staleys / Chicago Staleys / Chicago Bears (1920–1921, 1923–1932).
- 1968: Wayne Millner – Boston / Washington Redskins (1936–1941, 1945).
- 1975: George Connor – Chicago Bears (1948–1955).
- 1986: Paul Hornung – Green Bay Packers (1957–1962, 1964–1966).
- 1988: Alan Page – Minnesota Vikings (1967–1978), Chicago Bears (1978–1981).
- 2000: Joe Montana – San Francisco 49ers (1979–1992), Kansas City Chiefs (1993–1994).
- 2001: Nick Buoniconti – Boston Patriots (1962–1968), Miami Dolphins (1969–1974, 1976).
- 2002: Dave Casper – Oakland Raiders (1974–1980), Houston Oilers (1980–1983), Minnesota Vikings (1983), Los Angeles Raiders (1984).
- 2015: Jerome Bettis – Los Angeles / St. Louis Rams (1993–1995), Pittsburgh Steelers (1996–2005).
- 2015: Tim Brown – Los Angeles / Oakland Raiders (1988–2003), Tampa Bay Buccaneers (2004).
- 2016: Edward J. DeBartolo Jr. – San Francisco 49ers (1977–2000), received B.A. from Notre Dame, inducted into Pro Hall of Fame in 2016 as a Contributor.
- 2021: Bryant Young – San Francisco 49ers (1994–2007).

*Blood graduated from St. John's (MN), but started his career at Notre Dame and is listed as a hall of famer under both schools in the Pro Football Hall of Fame.

=== Current NFL players ===
Name	Position	Current team	NFL debut	Seasons at Notre Dame
Joe Alt	T	Los Angeles Chargers	2024	2021–2023
Brandon Aubrey	K	Dallas Cowboys	2023	2013–2016 (soccer)
Kevin Austin Jr.	WR	New Orleans Saints	2024	2018–2021
Aaron Banks	G	Green Bay Packers	2021	2017–2020
JD Bertrand	LB	Atlanta Falcons	2024	2019–2023
Jordan Botelho	LB			2020–2025
Jordan Clark	CB	New York Jets	2025	2024
Beaux Collins	WR	Atlanta Falcons	2025	2024
Pat Coogan	C	Tennessee Titans	2026	2021–2024
Zeke Correll	C			2019–2023
Howard Cross III	DT	Cincinnati Bengals	2025	2019–2024
Scott Daly	LS	Chicago Bears	2021	2012–2016
Sheldon Day	DT		2016	2012–2015
Liam Eichenberg	G		2021	2016–2020
Audric Estimé	RB	Cleveland Browns	2024	2021–2023
Mitchell Evans	TE	Carolina Panthers	2025	2021–2024
Malachi Fields	WR	New York Giants	2026	2025
Blake Fisher	T	Houston Texans	2024	2021–2023
Isaiah Foskey	DE	Cincinnati Bengals	2023	2019–2022
Alohi Gilman	S	Kansas City Chiefs	2020	2017–2019
Blake Grupe	K	Los Angeles Rams	2023	2022
Robert Hainsey	C	Jacksonville Jaguars	2021	2017–2020
Kyle Hamilton	S	Baltimore Ravens	2022	2019–2021
Thomas Harper	S	Detroit Lions	2024	2023
Cam Hart	CB	Los Angeles Chargers	2024	2019–2023
Sam Hartman	QB	Washington Commanders		2023
Kurt Hinish	DT		2022	2017–2021
Max Hurleman	RB	Pittsburgh Steelers	2026	2024
J. J. Jansen	LS	Carolina Panthers	2009	2004–2007
Javontae Jean-Baptiste	LB	Washington Commanders	2024	2023
Khalid Kareem	DE	San Francisco 49ers	2020	2016–2019
Aidan Keanaaina	DT	Detroit Lions		2020–2023
Lawrence Keys	WR	Detroit Lions		2018–2020
Jack Kiser	LB	Cincinnati Bengals	2025	2019–2024
Cole Kmet	TE	Chicago Bears	2020	2017–2019
Riley Leonard	QB	Indianapolis Colts	2025	2024
Marist Liufau	LB	Dallas Cowboys	2024	2019–2023
Jeremiyah Love	RB	Arizona Cardinals	2026	2023–2025
Julian Love	S	Seattle Seahawks	2019	2016–2018
Michael Mayer	TE	Las Vegas Raiders	2023	2020–2022
Nick McCloud	CB	Chicago Bears	2021	2020
Mike McGlinchey	T	Denver Broncos	2018	2013–2017
Rylie Mills	DT	Seattle Seahawks	2025	2020–2024
Benjamin Morrison	CB	Tampa Bay Buccaneers	2025	2022–2024
Sam Mustipher	C	Jacksonville Jaguars	2020	2014–2018
Quenton Nelson	G	Indianapolis Colts	2018	2014–2017
Julian Okwara	DE		2020	2016–2019
Jeremiah Owusu-Koramoah	LB	Cleveland Browns	2021	2017–2020
Jarrett Patterson	C	San Francisco 49ers	2023	2018–2022
Will Pauling	WR	San Francisco 49ers		2025
Jadarian Price	RB	Seattle Seahawks	2026	2022–2025
Eli Raridon	TE	New England Patriots	2026	2022–2025
Gabriel Rubio	DT	Pittsburgh Steelers	2026	2021–2025
Billy Schrauth	G	Tampa Bay Buccaneers		2022–2025
Spencer Shrader	K	Indianapolis Colts	2024	2023
Ben Skowronek	WR	Pittsburgh Steelers	2021	2020
Chris Smith	DT	Miami Dolphins	2024	2022
DeVonta Smith	CB	Carolina Panthers		2025
Harrison Smith	S	Minnesota Vikings	2012	2007–2011
Durham Smythe	TE	Baltimore Ravens	2018	2013–2017
Ronnie Stanley	T	Baltimore Ravens	2016	2012–2015
Jalen Stroman	S	San Francisco 49ers		2025
Lorenzo Styles Jr.	S	New Orleans Saints	2026	2021–2022
Jerry Tillery	DT	Indianapolis Colts	2019	2015–2018
Carson Towt	TE	Indianapolis Colts		2025–2026 (basketball)
Drue Tranquill	LB	Kansas City Chiefs	2019	2014–2018
Tommy Tremble	TE	Carolina Panthers	2021	2018–2020
Aamil Wagner	T			2022–2025
Xavier Watts	S	Atlanta Falcons	2025	2020–2024
Kyren Williams	RB	Los Angeles Rams	2022	2019–2021
Brock Wright	TE	Detroit Lions	2021	2017–2020
This list is complete and up-to-date through September 2, 2026.

== Media ==
The Fighting Irish are the only team, professional or collegiate, to have all their games broadcast nationally on the radio and their home games on television. Notre Dame left the College Football Association, a consortium that administered television broadcast rights on behalf of over 64 schools, in 1990 in order to establish its own broadcasting deal with NBC. From 1968 to 2007, Westwood One served as the official radio partner for the Irish, broadcasting their games for 40 consecutive years.

Until the 2006 Air Force game, Notre Dame had a record 169 consecutive games broadcast nationally on either NBC, ABC, ESPN, or CBS. The 2006 ND vs. Air Force game was broadcast on CSTV, a college sports channel owned by CBS who had an exclusive contract with the Mountain West Conference, of which Air Force is a member.

=== Radio ===
Radio rights to the Fighting Irish are held by Skyview Networks, who began distributing the broadcasts as part of a multi-sport arrangement in 2020.

==== Current broadcast team ====
- Paul Burmeister (play-by-play) 2018–present
- Ryan Harris (color commentator) 2018–present
- Jack Nolan (network studio host) 2020–present

==== Former commentators ====
- Tony Roberts (play-by-play) – 1980–2005
- Tom Pagna (color analyst)
- Pat Haden
- Ralph Guglielmi
- Lindsey Nelson
- Al Wester
- Don Criqui (play-by-play) – 1974–1976, 2006–2017
- Allen Pinkett (color analyst) – 2002–2017
- Tom Hammond
- Mike Mayock
- Tony Dungy

=== Television ===
NBC has been televising Notre Dame home regular season football games since the 1991 season. In addition to TV broadcasts, NBC also maintains several dedicated websites to ND football and Notre Dame Central, which provides complete coverage, full game replays and commentary of the Notre Dame team. NBC's television contract with Notre Dame was renewed in April 2013 and was set to continue through the 2025 football season, before another contract renewal was made in 2023. NBC is now set to be the home of Notre Dame football through the 2029 season. It also aired football games on NBC's streaming service Peacock started in the 2021 season, with the home opener on September 11, 2021, against Toledo aired exclusively on the streaming service. South Bend NBC affiliate WNDU-TV also produces its own pregame show, Countdown to Kickoff, which airs prior to every home game broadcast on NBC. Internationally Sky Sports has been covering Notre Dame Football home games in the United Kingdom, Republic of Ireland, Italy and Germany since 2018 as a result of Comcast's takeover of Sky.

==== Current broadcast team ====
- Dan Hicks (lead play-by-play)
- Jason Garrett (lead color commentator)
- Zora Stephenson (lead sideline reporter)
- Noah Eagle (primetime play-by-play)
- Todd Blackledge (primetime color commentator)
- Kathryn Tappen (primetime sideline reporter)

== Future schedules ==
Although the Notre Dame football program is not a member of the Atlantic Coast Conference (ACC), it has an agreement to play an average of five ACC schools per season. In return Notre Dame has access to the non-College Football Playoff ACC bowl lineup. Notre Dame utilizes a format of six home games in South Bend, five away games, and one major metropolitan area neutral site "Shamrock Series" home game for scheduling. This includes preserving its annual game versus Navy, five rotating ACC opponents (two away ACC games will coincide in even years with away games at Navy and three away ACC games will coincide in odd years with home games against Navy), two home and home series (one home game and one away game), one one-time opponent home game, and the traveling "Shamrock Series" home game.

=== 2027 ===
Date	Opponent	Site	Result
August 28	Kent State	Notre Dame Stadium; Notre Dame, IN	
September 4	Illinois	Notre Dame Stadium; Notre Dame, IN	
September 18	at Michigan State	Spartan Stadium; East Lansing, MI	
September 25	Auburn	Notre Dame Stadium; Notre Dame, IN	
October 9	vs. Wake Forest	Bank of America Stadium; Charlotte, NC	
October 30	at Clemson	Memorial Stadium; Clemson, SC	
November 6	Virginia Tech	Notre Dame Stadium; Notre Dame, IN	
November 20	Navy	Notre Dame Stadium; Notre Dame, IN	
November 27	at Stanford	Stanford Stadium; Stanford, CA	
TBA	BYU	Notre Dame Stadium; Notre Dame, IN	
TBA	at Duke	Wallace Wade Stadium; Durham, NC	
TBA	at Virginia	Scott Stadium; Charlottesville, VA	

=== 2028 ===
Date	Opponent	Site	Result
September 2	at Illinois	Gies Memorial Stadium; Champaign, IL	
September 9	Texas	Notre Dame Stadium; Notre Dame, IN	
September 16	Arkansas	Notre Dame Stadium; Notre Dame, IN	
October 7	Clemson	Notre Dame Stadium; Notre Dame, IN	
October 14	Stanford	Notre Dame Stadium; Notre Dame, IN	
October 28	at Auburn	Jordan–Hare Stadium; Auburn, AL	
November 4	at Virginia Tech	Lane Stadium; Blacksburg, VA	
November 18	at Navy	Navy–Marine Corps Memorial Stadium; Annapolis, MD	
TBA	Boston College	Notre Dame Stadium; Notre Dame, IN	
TBA	Miami	Notre Dame Stadium; Notre Dame, IN	
TBA	at Pittsburgh	Acrisure Stadium; Pittsburgh, PA	

TBA: 1 additional game will be scheduled.

=== 2029 ===
Date	Opponent	Site	Result
September 1	Alabama	Notre Dame Stadium; Notre Dame, IN	
September 15	at South Florida	Raymond James Stadium; Tampa, FL	
September 22	at Texas	Darrell K Royal–Texas Memorial Stadium; Austin, TX	
October 6	at NC State	Carter–Finley Stadium; Raleigh, NC	
October 27	Navy	Notre Dame Stadium; Notre Dame, IN	
November 3	at Clemson	Memorial Stadium; Clemson, SC	
November 10	at Florida State	Doak Campbell Stadium; Tallahassee, FL	
TBA	Georgia Tech	Notre Dame Stadium; Notre Dame, IN	
TBA	Wake Forest	Notre Dame Stadium; Notre Dame, IN	
TBA	at Syracuse	JMA Wireless Dome; Syracuse, NY	

TBA: 2 additional games will be scheduled.

=== 2030 ===
Date	Opponent	Site	Result
August 31	at USC	Los Angeles Memorial Coliseum; Los Angeles, CA	
September 14	at Alabama	Bryant–Denny Stadium; Tuscaloosa, AL	
October 19	Clemson	Notre Dame Stadium; Notre Dame, IN	
November 2	at Louisville	L&N Federal Credit Union Stadium; Louisville, KY	
TBA	Duke	Notre Dame Stadium; Notre Dame, IN	
TBA	Florida State	Notre Dame Stadium; Notre Dame, IN	
TBA	North Carolina	Notre Dame Stadium; Notre Dame, IN	
TBA	at Boston College	Alumni Stadium; Chestnut Hill, MA	
TBA	at Navy	Navy–Marine Corps Memorial Stadium; Annapolis, MD	

TBA: 3 additional games will be scheduled.

=== 2031 ===
Date	Opponent	Site	Result
August 30	USC	Notre Dame Stadium; Notre Dame, IN	
September 13	South Florida	Notre Dame Stadium; Notre Dame, IN	
September 27	Washington	Notre Dame Stadium; Notre Dame, IN	
October 11	at Clemson	Memorial Stadium; Clemson, SC	
November 22	NC State	Notre Dame Stadium; Notre Dame, IN	
TBA	Miami	Notre Dame Stadium; Notre Dame, IN	
TBA	Navy	Notre Dame Stadium; Notre Dame, IN	
TBA	at Pittsburgh	Acrisure Stadium; Pittsburgh, PA	
TBA	at North Carolina	Kenan Memorial Stadium; Chapel Hill, NC	
TBA	at Virginia	Scott Stadium; Charlottesville, VA	

TBA: 2 additional games will be scheduled.

=== 2032 ===
Date	Opponent	Site	Result
October 16	Clemson	Notre Dame Stadium; Notre Dame, IN	
October 30	at Nebraska	Memorial Stadium; Lincoln, NE	
TBA	Florida State	Notre Dame Stadium; Notre Dame, IN	
TBA	at Georgia Tech	Bobby Dodd Stadium; Atlanta, GA	
TBA	Louisville	Notre Dame Stadium; Notre Dame, IN	
TBA	Wake Forest	Notre Dame Stadium; Notre Dame, IN	
TBA	at Miami	Hard Rock Stadium; Miami Gardens, FL	
TBA	at Navy	Navy–Marine Corps Memorial Stadium; Annapolis, MD	
TBA	at USC	Los Angeles Memorial Coliseum; Los Angeles, CA	

TBA: 3 additional games will be scheduled.

=== 2033 ===
Date	Opponent	Site	Result
September 3	at Michigan	Michigan Stadium; Ann Arbor, MI	
September 24	at Duke	Wallace Wade Stadium; Durham, NC	
October 15	at Clemson	Memorial Stadium; Clemson, SC	
October 29	Nebraska	Notre Dame Stadium; Notre Dame, IN	
November 5	Virginia Tech	Notre Dame Stadium; Notre Dame, IN	
TBA	Pittsburgh	Notre Dame Stadium; Notre Dame, IN	
TBA	USC	Notre Dame Stadium; Notre Dame, IN	
TBA	at Boston College	Alumni Stadium; Chestnut Hill, MA	
TBA	at Louisville	L&N Federal Credit Union Stadium; Louisville, KY	

TBA: 3 additional games will be scheduled.

=== 2034 ===
Date	Opponent	Site	Result
September 2	Michigan	Notre Dame Stadium; Notre Dame, IN	
October 14	Clemson	Notre Dame Stadium; Notre Dame, IN	
October 26	at Miami	Hard Rock Stadium; Miami Gardens, FL	
November 11	at Washington	Husky Stadium; Seattle, WA	
November 18	Virginia	Notre Dame Stadium; Notre Dame, IN	
TBA	Syracuse	Notre Dame Stadium; Notre Dame, IN	
TBA	at Pittsburgh	Acrisure Stadium; Pittsburgh, PA	

TBA: 5 additional games will be scheduled.
