= Leonard Fournette =

American football player (born 1995)

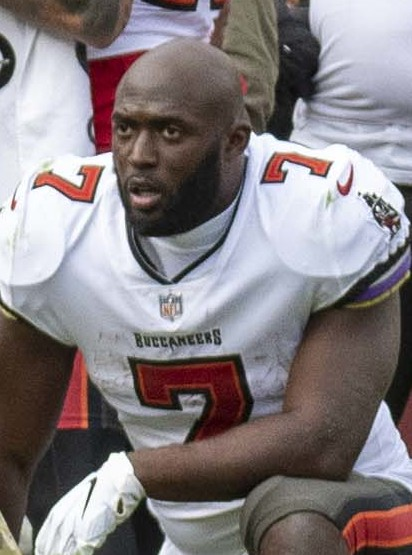
- Fournette with the Tampa Bay Buccaneers in 2021

No. 27, 28, 7, 5
- Position: Running back

Personal information
- Born: January 18, 1995 (age 31); New Orleans, Louisiana, U.S.
- Listed height: 6 ft 0 in (1.83 m)
- Listed weight: 228 lb (103 kg)

Career information
- High school: St. Augustine (New Orleans)
- College: LSU (2014–2016)
- NFL draft: 2017: 1st round, 4th overall pick

Career history
- Jacksonville Jaguars (2017–2019); Tampa Bay Buccaneers (2020–2022); Buffalo Bills (2023)

Awards and highlights
- Super Bowl champion (LV); Consensus All-American (2015); First-team All-SEC (2015); Second-team All-SEC (2016)

Career NFL statistics
- Rushing yards: 4,518
- Rushing average: 3.9
- Rushing touchdowns: 34
- Receptions: 312
- Receiving yards: 2,219
- Receiving touchdowns: 7
- Stats at Pro Football Reference

Leonard Joseph Fournette III (born January 18, 1995) is an American former professional football player who was a running back in the National Football League (NFL) for seven seasons. He played college football for the LSU Tigers, and was selected by the Jacksonville Jaguars with the fourth overall pick in the 2017 NFL draft.

Fournette had near-unprecedented hype headed into college in 2014 after an outstanding career at St. Augustine High School in New Orleans. He won the 2013 USA Today High School Football Offensive Player of the Year and was named the top-ranked recruit in 2014 senior class according to ESPN, 247Sports.com, and CBS Sports. At LSU, Fournette was a consensus All-America selection following his sophomore season in 2015, after setting school single-season records with 1,953 rushing yards and 22 rushing touchdowns, and leading the country with 162.8 rushing yards per game. Various experts regarded Fournette as the best player in college football. He missed much of his junior season due to recurring ankle injuries.

Upon being drafted by the Jaguars, Fournette had immediate success, including rushing for over 1,000 yards as a rookie. However, he struggled with several injuries and suspensions and his relationship with the franchise soured as a result, eventually leading to his release after just three seasons with the team. Fournette then signed with the Buccaneers, with whom he played a large part in winning Super Bowl LV over the Kansas City Chiefs. Fournette remained the team's primary starter for most of the 2021 and 2022 seasons. After being released by the Buccaneers, he played in two games for the Buffalo Bills in 2023.

== Early life ==
Raised in the 7th Ward of New Orleans by his parents, Leonard Jr. and Lory, Fournette grew up in a troubled area that was often affected by violence and gang activity, especially after Hurricane Katrina hit in 2005. Fournette credited Katrina as kick-starting his football career after moving to Houston and back within a year because of the hurricane evacuation. Fournette also credits his mother's Catholic faith with getting the family through the recovery process.

After returning to New Orleans, Fournette played football at St. Augustine High School, and competed in track and field. His 200 metres regional mark of 21.57 seconds is fastest in 4A, and his 10.68 in the 100 metres is only .02 off the best time. Fournette also competed in the 4 × 100 metres relay and 4 × 200 metres relay.

On the varsity football team, Fournette was a starter since his freshman year and compiled 7,619 rushing yards and 88 rushing touchdowns for his career. As a freshman, Fournette rushed for more than 2,500 yards and 30 touchdowns and became the first-ever freshman to earn a scholarship offer from Louisiana State. His sophomore year ended with 1,900 yards rushing and 27 touchdowns. As a junior, Fournette registered 2,135 rushing yards and 31 touchdowns and was an LFCA Class 4A First-team All-State honoree. In his senior year, Fournette ran for 1,792 yards and 16 touchdowns and added 45 receptions for 745 yards and six scores. Early in the season, he had a heralded performance with two touchdowns and 262 yards rushing against Malachi Dupre's John Curtis Christian, which was nationally televised by ESPN2. St. Augustine ended the season with a 9–2 record and an appearance in the LHSAA Division I semifinal game, where they were upset 31–28 by Archbishop Rummel High School. Fournette was named Louisiana's 2013 Mr. Football by the Louisiana Sports Writers Association, and also was selected as an All-American by Parade and USA Today, as well as USA Today Offensive Player of the Year, the first from Louisiana since Ryan Perrilloux in 2004. After the season, Fournette participated in the Under Armour All-America Game where he caught a 36-yard touchdown pass and rushed for 43 yards on nine carries.

Unanimously regarded as the best running back prospect of his class, Fournette was one of the most highly recruited players ever to come out of Louisiana. ESPN ranked him as the No. 1 recruit in the class of 2014, as did Scout.com. At the 2014 Under Armour All-America Game, Fournette announced his decision to attend Louisiana State University (LSU).

== College career ==
Fournette attended and played college football for LSU from 2014 to 2016 under head coaches Les Miles and Ed Orgeron.

=== Freshman season ===
Fournette's college career was preceded by very high expectations and hype, and he was often called "the next Adrian Peterson". In his collegiate debut against the Wisconsin Badgers on August 30, 2014, Fournette ran for 18 yards on eight carries. After the game, Tigers head coach Les Miles downplayed the Fournette hype. "First games are not to be comparable to his 30th game," said Miles. "Expectations are unrealistic." In his second game, against the Sam Houston State Bearkats, Fournette rushed for 92 yards on 13 attempts and scored his first collegiate rushing touchdown. In the fifth week of the season, the New Mexico State Aggies traveled to Death Valley to face the #17 LSU Tigers, and Fournette ran for 122 yards on 18 carries and scored two touchdowns. This effort put Fournette at the top of the Tigers' rushing list for the season. On October 11 against SEC rival Florida, Fournette rushed the ball 27 times for 140 yards and two touchdowns to help LSU secure a 30–27 last-second win in The Swamp. Against undefeated and #3 Ole Miss, who led the nation in stopping the run, Fournette shook off an early goal line fumble and rushed 23 times for 113 yards to go along with two receptions for 41 yards. LSU ran the ball 12 times for 92 yards on a 13-play, 95-yard touchdown drive to upset the Rebels by a score of 10–7 in Death Valley. Fournette finished the season against Notre Dame in the 2014 Music City Bowl with 11 carries for 143 yards and two touchdowns. He also had a 100-yard kickoff return for a touchdown in the loss to the Fighting Irish.

=== Sophomore season ===
Fournette started his sophomore season with a strong performance of 159 rushing yards and three touchdowns against Mississippi State. In the next game, a victory over Auburn, Fournette finished with 228 rushing yards and three touchdowns. He rushed for a career-high 244 yards and two touchdowns against Syracuse in the Carrier Dome, six yards shy of tying Alley Broussard's school record of 250 yards against Ole Miss in 2004. Fournette had an 87-yard touchdown run nullified by an illegal formation call late in the game. The following week against Eastern Michigan, he rushed for 233 yards, becoming the first player in Southeastern Conference (SEC) history to rush for 200 or more yards in three straight games. Against Western Kentucky, Fournette ran for 150 yards, his ninth consecutive 100+ yards rushing game, a streak that dated back to the Texas A&M game in late November 2014. Fournette tied a school record originally established by Charles Alexander in 1978. Fournette's streak ended the next game against rival Alabama, the nation's best rushing defense, at Bryant–Denny Stadium. He was held to 31 yards on 19 attempts, as the Crimson Tide handed LSU its first loss of the season. In the 2015 Texas Bowl, Fournette ran for 212 yards and scored five total touchdowns as the Tigers defeated Texas Tech, 56–27.

As a sophomore, Fournette set school records with 1,953 rushing yards and 22 rushing touchdowns. With an average of 162.8 rushing yards per game, he won the NCAA rushing title, awarded to the player with the highest rushing yards per game average each season. Fournette finished sixth in Heisman Trophy voting, earning 110 points. He earned consensus All-America honors as he was named to the first-team by three official selectors: the Associated Press (AP), the Walter Camp Football Foundation, and the Football Writers Association of America. SEC coaches, the Associated Press, and ESPN.com each named Fournette to their All-SEC first-team.

=== Junior season ===
Entering his junior season, Fournette was expected to contend for the Heisman Trophy, and was one of the preseason favorites to win the award. During a scrimmage game prior to the 2016 season, Fournette sustained a high ankle sprain, but was well enough to return for the season opener against Wisconsin at Lambeau Field. Late in the game against Wisconsin, he bruised the same ankle and missed the next week's game against Jacksonville State as a result. Fournette re-injured it against SEC West rival Auburn on September 24 in a 101-yard rushing effort, causing him to miss the next two games. On October 22, his first game back, Fournette rushed for 284 yards and three touchdowns against Ole Miss to set a new single-game school record for rushing yards. His school record was surpassed later in the season by Derrius Guice by one yard. With his ankle still not fully healed, Fournette was not expected to play against Florida on November 19, and did not suit up for pregame warm-ups. However, after a pregame scuffle between the teams in which Fournette shoved a Florida assistant coach, LSU head coach Ed Orgeron granted Fournette permission to play. Still visibly bothered by the injury, he managed only 40 yards on 12 carries and did not play in the fourth quarter. Due to the injury, Fournette did not travel with the team to College Station to face Texas A&M in the final game of the regular season. He finished his junior season having carried 129 times for 843 yards and eight touchdowns in seven games.

On December 5, 2016, Fournette announced his intention to enter the 2017 NFL draft. To avoid injury, his coach told Fournette to skip the 2016 Citrus Bowl, which LSU won over Louisville. Fournette finished his college career having rushed for 3,830 yards, the fourth-most by a player in LSU history behind Charles Alexander, Dalton Hilliard, and Kevin Faulk. His 40 rushing touchdowns are tied for third most in school history with Alexander and behind Hilliard and Faulk.

== Professional career ==
=== Pre-draft ===
Coming out of college, Fournette was highly touted as a top-10 pick in the upcoming draft and was ranked as the third-best prospect going into the NFL Combine. He arrived at the NFL combine weighing in five pounds heavier than his playing weight in college and opted to only participate in the vertical jump and 40-yard dash. At LSU's Pro Day, Fournette opted to only partake in positional drills. He was ranked the top overall running back prospect by NFLDraftScout.com, and second behind Florida State's Dalvin Cook by Pro Football Focus and Sports Illustrated.

External videos
- Fournette's NFL Combine workout
- Leonard Fournette's 40-yard dash
- Fournette's Pro Day highlights

Pre-draft measurables
Height	Weight	Arm length	Hand span	Wingspan	40-yard dash	10-yard split	20-yard split	Vertical jump	Wonderlic
6 ft 0 1/2 in (1.84 m)	240 lb (109 kg)	31 5/8 in (0.80 m)	9 1/4 in (0.23 m)	6 ft 3 1/4 in (1.91 m)	4.51 s	1.53 s	2.65 s	28.5 in (0.72 m)	11
All values from NFL Combine

External videos
- Jaguars select Fournette fourth overall
- Fournette arrives at 2017 NFL Draft

=== Jacksonville Jaguars ===
==== 2017 season ====
The Jacksonville Jaguars selected Fournette fourth overall in the 2017 NFL draft. He was the first running back taken in that year's draft. On May 17, 2017, the Jaguars signed Fournette to a four-year, $27 million contract with an $18 million signing bonus.

Fournette made his regular season debut on September 10, 2017, against the Houston Texans at NRG Stadium. He rushed for 100 yards and a touchdown on 26 carries as the Jaguars won 29–7. Three weeks later against the New York Jets, Fournette recorded a 10-yard reception in the first quarter for his first career receiving touchdown in the 23–20 overtime loss. In the next game against the Pittsburgh Steelers, Fournette posted an impressive performance with 181 rushing yards, including a Jaguars franchise-record 90-yard run in the fourth quarter, and two touchdowns during the 30–9 road victory. The following week against the Los Angeles Rams, Fournette had 21 carries for 130 yards, including a 75-yard touchdown run on the Jaguars' first play from scrimmage. He left the eventual 27–17 loss in the fourth quarter with a minor ankle injury. Because of the ankle injury, he was ruled out for Week 7. Following a bye week, more trouble arose as Fournette was declared inactive for Week 9 against the Cincinnati Bengals as he violated team rules.

Fournette finished his rookie year with 268 carries for 1,040 yards and nine touchdowns to go along with 36 receptions for 302 yards and a touchdown. He was ranked 58th by his peers on the NFL Top 100 Players of 2018.

The Jaguars finished the 2017 season atop the AFC South with a 10–6 record. During the Wild Card Round against the Buffalo Bills, Fournette struggled, rushing for 57 yards on 21 carries as the Jaguars won 10–3. In the Divisional Round against the Steelers, he briefly left the game with an ankle injury, but returned and finished with 109 yards and three touchdowns as the Jaguars won 45–42. During the AFC Championship Game against the New England Patriots, Fournette ran for 76 yards and a touchdown in the 24–20 road loss.

==== 2018 season ====
Fournette injured his hamstring during the season-opening 20–15 victory over the New York Giants. He missed the next two games before returning against the Jets, where he aggravated the injury and was ruled out indefinitely. After missing four more games, Fournette returned against the division rival Indianapolis Colts, rushing for 53 yards and a touchdown with 56 receiving yards and a receiving touchdown as the Jaguars lost 29–26. Against the Bills, Fournette had his best game of the season, rushing for 95 yards and two touchdowns. However, after a Donte Moncrief reception that was initially ruled a touchdown in the third quarter, Fournette got into a fistfight with Bills defender Shaq Lawson as part of a brawl that broke out between the Jaguars and Bills, and the two were subsequently ejected from the game. Without Fournette, the Jaguars lost 24–21. He was suspended one game the following day for the fight.

Fournette finished his second professional season with 133 carries for 439 yards and five touchdowns to go along with 22 receptions for 185 yards and a touchdown in eight games and starts.

==== 2019 season ====
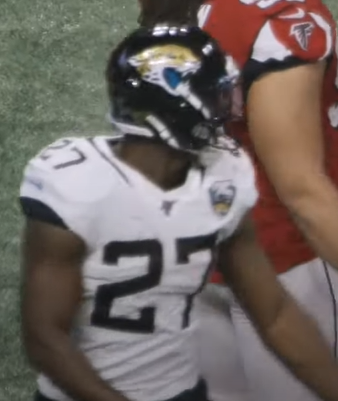
Fournette in 2019

During a narrow Week 4 26–24 road victory against the Denver Broncos, Fournette rushed for 225 yards, including an 81-yard rush, marking the first time in a single NFL game where he had over 200 rushing yards. In the next game against the Carolina Panthers, Fournette rushed 23 times for 108 yards and his first rushing touchdown of the season during the 34–27 road loss. Two weeks later against the Bengals, Fournette finished with 131 rushing yards as the Jaguars won 27–17.

During Week 12 against the Tennessee Titans, Fournette rushed 24 times for 97 yards and two touchdowns and caught nine passes for 62 yards in the 42–20 road loss. Overall, in the 2019 season, Fournette had 265 carries for 1,152 yards and three touchdowns to go along with 76 receptions for 522 yards.

On May 1, 2020, the Jaguars declined the fifth-year option on Fournette's contract, which would have made him a free agent in 2021. On August 31, the Jaguars waived Fournette after being unable to trade him.

=== Tampa Bay Buccaneers ===
==== 2020 season ====
On September 6, 2020, Fournette signed a one-year contract with the Tampa Bay Buccaneers.

During Week 2 against the Panthers, Fournette finished with 12 carries for 103 yards and two touchdowns, including a 46-yard rushing touchdown with 1:56 remaining to seal the game for the Buccaneers 31–17. Overall, in a backfield where Ronald Jones II got a majority of the carries, Fournette recorded 97 carries for 367 yards and six touchdowns to go along with 36 receptions for 233 yards in the 2020 season.

During the Wild Card Round against the Washington Football Team, Fournette rushed for 93 yards and a touchdown and caught four passes for 39 yards in the 31–23 road victory. In the Divisional Round of the playoffs against the New Orleans Saints, he rushed for 63 yards and recorded five receptions for 44 yards and a touchdown during the 30–20 road victory. During the NFC Championship Game against the Green Bay Packers, Fournette rushed for 55 yards and a touchdown in the 31–26 road victory. In Super Bowl LV against the Kansas City Chiefs, Fournette rushed for 89 yards and a touchdown and recorded four receptions for 46 yards during the 31–9 victory. His impressive playoff performance earned him the nickname "Playoff Lenny", which later evolved to "Lombardi Lenny" after scoring a touchdown in the Super Bowl victory over the Chiefs. Fournette became the third player in NFL history to score touchdowns in four games in a single postseason.

==== 2021 season ====
On March 31, 2021, Fournette re-signed with the Buccaneers on a one-year deal worth $3.25 million.

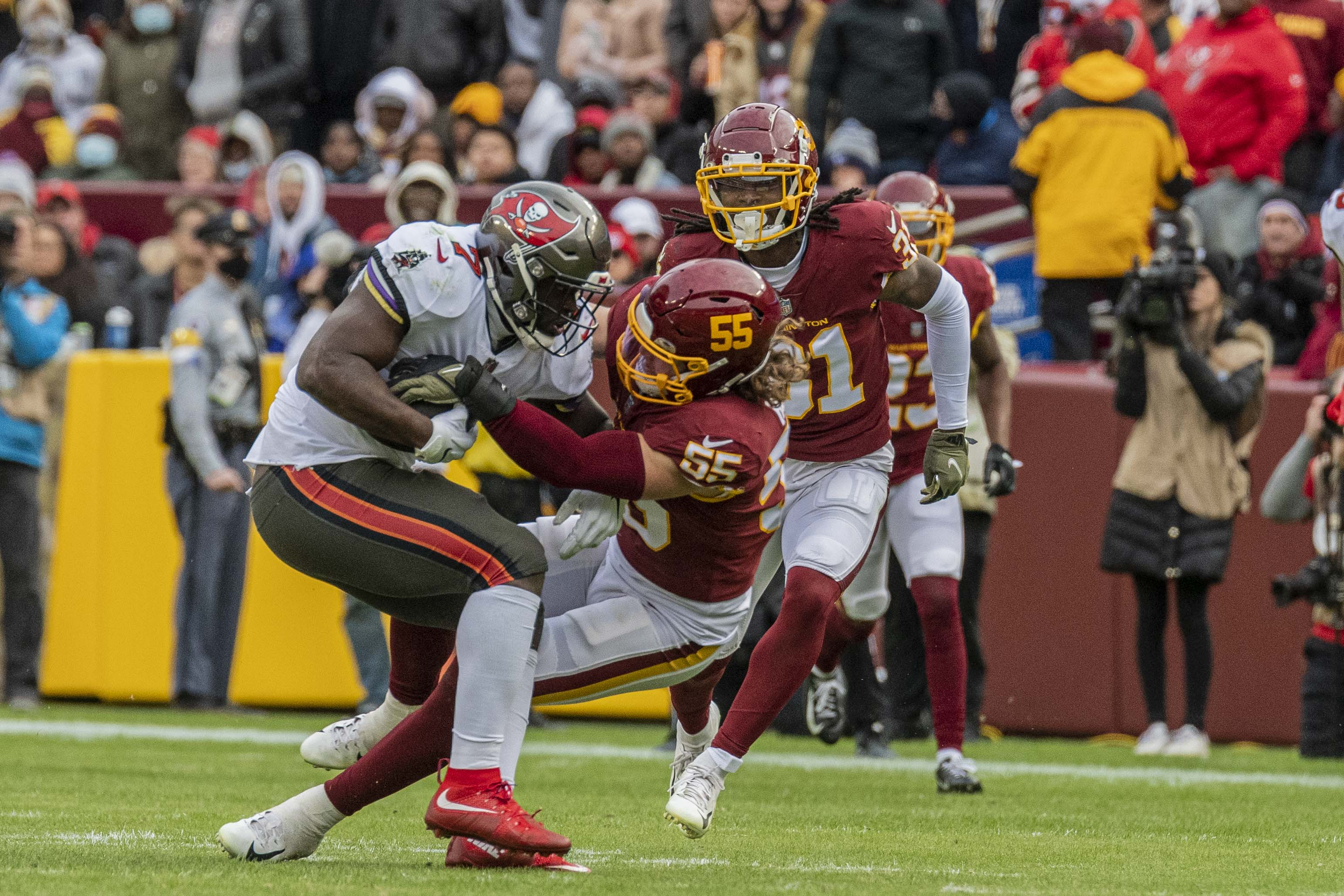
Fournette playing against the Washington Football Team in 2021.

Fournette was one of the first players to change his jersey number after the National Football League uniform numbers rule had changed in April 2021. Fournette decided to wear number 7, which he previously wore at LSU during his college career.

During Week 6 against the Philadelphia Eagles, Fournette had 127 scrimmage yards and two rushing touchdowns. Against the Colts in Week 12, Fournette rushed for 100 yards, had 31 receiving yards, and had four total touchdowns in the 38–31 win, earning NFC Offensive Player of the Week. He suffered a hamstring injury in Week 15 and was placed on injured reserve on December 23, 2021. Fournette finished the 2021 season with 180 carries for 812 yards and eight touchdowns to go along with 69 receptions for 454 yards and two touchdowns.

Fournette was activated on January 22, 2022. During the Divisional Round against the Rams, he had 107 scrimmage yards and two rushing touchdowns in the 30–27 loss.

==== 2022 season ====
On March 23, 2022, Fournette re-signed with the Buccaneers on a three-year, $21 million contract. In Week 1, Fournette rushed for 127 yards on 21 carries in a 19–3 victory over the Dallas Cowboys. In Week 5, against the Atlanta Falcons, he had 139 scrimmage yards, one rushing touchdown, and one receiving touchdown in the 21–15 victory. During Week 16 against the Arizona Cardinals, he had 162 scrimmage yards in the 19–16 victory.

Fournette finished the 2022 season with 189 carries for 668 yards and three touchdowns to go along with 73 receptions for 523 yards and three touchdowns in 16 games and nine starts.

On March 17, 2023, Fournette was released by the Buccaneers.

=== Buffalo Bills ===
On October 31, 2023, Fournette signed with the Bills practice squad. On December 23, Fournette was elevated from the practice squad due to Ty Johnson being inactive because of a shoulder injury. Fournette made his 2023 debut that night during the Week 16 matchup against the Los Angeles Chargers. Fournette was released on January 16, 2024.

== Career statistics ==
=== NFL ===
Legend
	Won the Super Bowl
	Led the league
**Bold**	Career high

==== Regular season ====
Year	Team	Games		Rushing					Receiving					Fumbles	
Year	Team	GP	GS	Att	Yds	Avg	Lng	TD	Rec	Yds	Avg	Lng	TD	Fum	Lost
2017	JAX	13	13	**268**	1,040	3.9	**90T**	**9**	36	302	**8.4**	28	1	**2**	0
2018	JAX	8	8	133	439	3.3	25	5	22	185	**8.4**	31	1	0	0
2019	JAX	15	**15**	265	**1,152**	4.3	81	3	**76**	522	6.9	27	0	1	**1**
2020	TB	13	3	97	367	3.8	46T	6	36	233	6.5	20	0	0	0
2021	TB	14	13	180	812	**4.5**	47	8	69	454	6.6	23	2	1	0
2022	TB	**16**	9	189	668	3.5	23	3	73	**523**	7.2	**44**	**3**	0	0
2023	BUF	2	0	12	40	3.3	9	0	0	0	0	0	0	0	0
Career		80	61	1,144	4,518	3.9	90T	34	312	2,219	7.3	44	7	4	1

==== Postseason ====
Year	Team	Games		Rushing					Receiving					Fumbles	
Year	Team	GP	GS	Att	Yds	Avg	Lng	TD	Rec	Yds	Avg	Lng	TD	Fum	Lost
2017	JAX	3	3	**70**	242	3.5	18	**4**	7	44	6.3	12	0	0	0
2020	TB	**4**	**4**	64	**300**	**4.7**	**27T**	3	**18**	**148**	**8.2**	**22**	**1**	0	0
2021	TB	1	1	13	51	3.9	11	2	9	56	6.2	19	0	0	0
2022	TB	1	0	5	11	2.2	6	0	1	6	6.0	6	0	0	0
2023	BUF	0	0	0	0	0	0	0	0	0	0.0	0	0	0	0
Career		10	8	159	624	3.9	27T	9	35	254	7.3	22	1	0	0

=== College ===
Season	Team	GP	GS	Rushing					Receiving		
Season	Team	GP	GS	Att	Yds	Avg	Lng	TD	Rec	Yds	TD
2014	LSU	13	6	187	1,034	5.5	89	10	7	127	0
2015	LSU	11	11	271	1,953	6.4	87	22	18	209	1
2016	LSU	7	7	129	843	6.5	78	8	15	146	0
Total		31	24	616	3,830	6.2	89	40	40	482	1

== Career highlights ==
=== Awards and honors ===
NFL

- Super Bowl champion (LV)
- Ranked No. 58 in the Top 100 Players of 2018

College

- Consensus All-American (2015)
- First-team All-SEC (2015)
- Second-team All-SEC (2016)

=== Records ===
==== NFL records ====
- Youngest player with a rushing touchdown of at least 90 yards (22 years, 263 days)

==== Jaguars franchise records ====
- First player to score a scrimmage touchdown in each of his first six career games
- First player to rush for at least 100 yards in his NFL debut
- Longest rushing play: 90 yards (October 8, 2017, against the Pittsburgh Steelers)

== Esports career ==
In 2021, Fournette signed with Complexity Gaming.

== Personal life ==
Fournette's younger brother, Lanard, also played at LSU.

On June 8, 2020, Fournette led a peaceful march of about 700 people, including police officers, in downtown Jacksonville to protest the murder of George Floyd.

On June 27, 2023, Fournette's car caught fire while he was driving on Interstate 275 near Tampa, Florida. Fournette escaped unharmed, but his vehicle was a total loss.

== See also ==
- LSU Tigers football statistical leaders
