= 2014 LSU Tigers football team =

American college football season

2014 LSU Tigers football

Music City Bowl, L 28–31 vs. Notre Dame
- Conference: Southeastern Conference
- Western Division
- Record: 0–5, 8 wins vacated (0–4 SEC, 4 wins vacated)
- Head coach: Les Miles (10th season)
- Offensive coordinator: Cam Cameron (2nd season)
- Offensive scheme: Multiple
- Defensive coordinator: John Chavis (6th season)
- Base defense: 4–3
- Home stadium: Tiger Stadium

2014 Southeastern Conference football standings
	Conf.			Overall
Team	W		L	W		L
Eastern Division
No. 14 Missouri x	7	–	1	11	–	3
No. 9 Georgia	6	–	2	10	–	3
Florida	4	–	4	7	–	5
Tennessee	3	–	5	7	–	6
South Carolina	3	–	5	7	–	6
Kentucky	2	–	6	5	–	7
Vanderbilt	0	–	8	3	–	9
Western Division
No. 4 Alabama x$^	7	–	1	12	–	2
No. 11 Mississippi State	6	–	2	10	–	3
No. 17 Ole Miss *	5	–	3	9	–	4
No. 22 Auburn	4	–	4	8	–	5
LSU *	4	–	4	8	–	5
Texas A&M	3	–	5	8	–	5
Arkansas	2	–	6	7	–	6
Championship: Alabama 42, Missouri 13
^ – College Football Playoff participant; $ – Conference champion; x – Division champion/co-champions; * LSU and Ole Miss vacated all wins (except for Ole Miss' win over Presbyterian) due to NCAA violations.; Rankings from AP Poll

The 2014 LSU Tigers football team represented Louisiana State University as a member of the Western Division of the Southeastern Conference (SEC) during the 2014 NCAA Division I FBS football season. Led by tenth-year head coach Les Miles, the Tigers finished the season with an overall record of 8–5 and mark of 4–4 in conference play, tying for fourth place in the SEC's Western Division. LSU was invited to the Music City Bowl, where the Tigers lost to Notre Dame. The team played home games Tiger Stadium in Baton Rouge, Louisiana.

In 2023, the National Collegiate Athletic Association (NCAA) vacated all of LSU's wins from the 2012 through 2015 seasons due to an ineligible player.

== Offseason ==
Shortly after the 2013 season, LSU issued a statement that offensive line coach Greg Studrawa would be leaving the team. After a brief search, coach Les Miles announced the hiring of Jeff Grimes to replace Studrawa. Grimes served as the offensive line coach for Virginia Tech in 2013. Prior to Virginia Tech, Grimes spent four years at the same position at Auburn, where he helped that team win the national championship in 2010. LSU was also in need of a new special teams coordinator after Thomas McGaughey left to take the same position with the New York Jets. The Tigers hired Bradley Dale Peveto, who previously spent four seasons as an assistant at LSU from 2005 to 2008, as his replacement.

For the second year in a row, LSU had more underclassmen declare for the NFL draft than any other team in the country. Key losses included Mettenberger, third-team All American Odell Beckham Jr., and second-team All-SEC players Jarvis Landry, Jeremy Hill, Anthony Johnson, and Lamin Barrow.

The Tigers' 2014 recruiting class was considered one of the top in the nation, bolstered by several top prospects from the state of Louisiana, including New Orleans running back Leonard Fournette, River Ridge wide receiver Malachi Dupre, and Lake Charles wide receiver Trey Quinn. The class was considered the consensus #2 class by all the major recruiting outlets.

In 2023, all wins for the 2013 season were vacated by the NCAA.

=== Key departures ===
Name	Number	Pos.	Height	Weight	Year	Hometown	Notes
Odell Beckham Jr.	3	WR	6'0"	193	Junior	New Orleans, Louisiana	1st round draft pick (12th overall) of the New York Giants
Alfred Blue	4	RB	6'2"	222	Senior	Boutte, Louisiana	6th round draft pick (181st overall) of the Houston Texans
Craig Loston	6	S	6'2"	209	Senior	Houston, Texas	Undrafted free agent signing of the Jacksonville Jaguars
Zach Mettenberger	8	QB	6'5"	235	Senior	Watkinsville, Georgia	6th round draft pick (178th overall) of the Tennessee Titans
Ego Ferguson	9	DT	6'3"	309	Junior	Mims, Florida	2nd round draft pick (51st overall) of the Chicago Bears
Lamin Barrow	18	LB	6'2"	232	Senior	Marrero, Louisiana	5th round draft pick (156th overall) of the Denver Broncos
Jeremy Hill	33	RB	6'2"	235	Sophomore	Baton Rouge, Louisiana	2nd round draft pick (55th overall) of the Cincinnati Bengals
J.C. Copeland	44	FB	6'1"	270	Senior	LaGrange, Georgia	Undrafted free agent signing of the Dallas Cowboys
Trai Turner	56	OG	6'3"	316	Sophomore	New Orleans, Louisiana	3rd round draft pick (92nd overall) of the Carolina Panthers
Jarvis Landry	80	WR	6'1"	195	Junior	Convent, Louisiana	2nd round draft pick (63rd overall) of the Miami Dolphins
James Wright	82	WR	6'2"	203	Senior	Belle Chasse, Louisiana	7th round draft pick (239th overall) of the Cincinnati Bengals
Kadron Boone	86	WR	6'0"	202	Senior	Ocala, Florida	Undrafted free agent signing of the Philadelphia Eagles
Anthony Johnson	90	DT	6'3"	294	Junior	New Orleans, Louisiana	Undrafted free agent signing of the Miami Dolphins

=== Class of 2014 signees ===
College recruiting
Name	Hometown	School	Height	Weight	Commit date
Jamal Adams; DB	Lewisville, Texas	Hebron High School	6 ft 0 in (1.83 m)	201 lb (91 kg)	Jan 2, 2014
Jamal Adams; DB	Recruit ratings: Scout: Rivals: 247Sports: ESPN:				
Donnie Alexander; LB	New Orleans, Louisiana	Edna Karr High School	6 ft 1 in (1.85 m)	205 lb (93 kg)	Feb 24, 2013
Donnie Alexander; LB	Recruit ratings: Scout: Rivals: 247Sports: ESPN:				
John Battle; DB	Hallandale, Florida	Hallandale High School	6 ft 1 in (1.85 m)	179 lb (81 kg)	Jun 28, 2013
John Battle; DB	Recruit ratings: Scout: Rivals: 247Sports: ESPN:				
Garrett Brumfield; OG	Baton Rouge, Louisiana	University High School	6 ft 4 in (1.93 m)	280 lb (130 kg)	Apr 20, 2013
Garrett Brumfield; OG	Recruit ratings: Scout: Rivals: 247Sports: ESPN:				
D. J. Chark; WR	Alexandria, Louisiana	Alexandria High School	6 ft 1 in (1.85 m)	174 lb (79 kg)	Jun 10, 2013
D. J. Chark; WR	Recruit ratings: Scout: Rivals: 247Sports: ESPN:				
Will Clapp; OG	New Orleans, Louisiana	Brother Martin High School	6 ft 4 in (1.93 m)	270 lb (120 kg)	Jan 12, 2013
Will Clapp; OG	Recruit ratings: Scout: Rivals: 247Sports: ESPN:				
Deondre Clark; DE	Oklahoma City, Oklahoma	Douglass High School	6 ft 3 in (1.91 m)	233 lb (106 kg)	Jun 24, 2013
Deondre Clark; DE	Recruit ratings: Scout: Rivals: 247Sports: ESPN:				
Malachi Dupre; WR	River Ridge, Louisiana	John Curtis Christian High School	6 ft 3 in (1.91 m)	182 lb (83 kg)	Feb 5, 2014
Malachi Dupre; WR	Recruit ratings: Scout: Rivals: 247Sports: ESPN:				
Leonard Fournette; RB	New Orleans, Louisiana	St. Augustine High School	6 ft 1 in (1.85 m)	226 lb (103 kg)	Jan 2, 2014
Leonard Fournette; RB	Recruit ratings: Scout: Rivals: 247Sports: ESPN:				
Russell Gage; ATH	Baton Rouge, Louisiana	Redemptorist High School	6 ft 0 in (1.83 m)	177 lb (80 kg)	Jan 29, 2014
Russell Gage; ATH	Recruit ratings: Scout: Rivals: 247Sports: ESPN:				
Cameron Gamble; K	Flower Mound, Texas	Flower Mound High School	5 ft 11 in (1.80 m)	180 lb (82 kg)	Jul 13, 2013
Cameron Gamble; K	Recruit ratings: Scout: Rivals: 247Sports: ESPN:				
Clifton Garrett; LB	Joliet, Illinois	Plainfield South High School	6 ft 2 in (1.88 m)	224 lb (102 kg)	Dec 17, 2013
Clifton Garrett; LB	Recruit ratings: Scout: Rivals: 247Sports: ESPN:				
Davon Godchaux; DE	Plaquemine, Louisiana	Plaquemine High School	6 ft 4 in (1.93 m)	271 lb (123 kg)	Sep 30, 2013
Davon Godchaux; DE	Recruit ratings: Scout: Rivals: 247Sports: ESPN:				
Brandon Harris; QB	Bossier City, Louisiana	Parkway High School	6 ft 3 in (1.91 m)	189 lb (86 kg)	Jul 18, 2013
Brandon Harris; QB	Recruit ratings: Scout: Rivals: 247Sports: ESPN:				
Trey Lealaimatafao; DT	San Antonio, Texas	Warren High School	6 ft 1 in (1.85 m)	297 lb (135 kg)	Feb 5, 2014
Trey Lealaimatafao; DT	Recruit ratings: Scout: Rivals: 247Sports: ESPN:				
Edward Paris; DB	Mansfield, Texas	Timberview High School	6 ft 1 in (1.85 m)	197 lb (89 kg)	Feb 25, 2013
Edward Paris; DB	Recruit ratings: Scout: Rivals: 247Sports: ESPN:				
Trey Quinn; WR	Lake Charles, Louisiana	Barbe High School	6 ft 1 in (1.85 m)	200 lb (91 kg)	Aug 17, 2013
Trey Quinn; WR	Recruit ratings: Scout: Rivals: 247Sports: ESPN:				
Sione Teuhema; DE	Keller, Texas	Keller High School	6 ft 4 in (1.93 m)	214 lb (97 kg)	Feb 5, 2014
Sione Teuhema; DE	Recruit ratings: Scout: Rivals: 247Sports: ESPN:				
Tony Upchurch; WR	Pearland, Texas	Dawson High School	6 ft 2 in (1.88 m)	221 lb (100 kg)	Mar 15, 2013
Tony Upchurch; WR	Recruit ratings: Scout: Rivals: 247Sports: ESPN:				
Travonte Valentine; DT	Hialeah, Florida	Champagnat Catholic School	6 ft 3 in (1.91 m)	295 lb (134 kg)	Feb 5, 2014
Travonte Valentine; DT	Recruit ratings: Scout: Rivals: 247Sports: ESPN:				
Devin Voorhies; ATH	Woodville, Mississippi	Wilkinson County High School	6 ft 1 in (1.85 m)	190 lb (86 kg)	Jul 28, 2012
Devin Voorhies; ATH	Recruit ratings: Scout: Rivals: 247Sports: ESPN:				
Overall recruit ranking: Scout: 2 Rivals: 2 247Sports: 2 ESPN: 2
Note: In many cases, Scout, Rivals, 247Sports, On3, and ESPN may conflict in their listings of height and weight.; In these cases, the average was taken. ESPN grades are on a 100-point scale.; Sources: "2014 LSU Football Commitment List". Rivals.; "Louisiana State College Football Recruiting Commits". Scout.; "LSU Tigers". ESPN.; "Scout.com Team Recruiting Rankings". Scout.; "2014 Team Ranking". Rivals.com.

== Coaching staff ==
Name	Position	Seasons at LSU	Alma mater
Les Miles	Head coach	10	Michigan (1976)
Cam Cameron	Offensive coordinator, Quarterbacks	2	Indiana (1983)
John Chavis	Defensive coordinator	6	Tennessee (1979)
Frank Wilson	Running backs, Recruiting coordinator	5	Nicholls State (1997)
Steve Ensminger	Tight ends	5	LSU (1982)
Brick Haley	Defensive line	6	Alabama A&M (1989)
Adam Henry	Wide receivers	3	McNeese State (1998)
Bradley Dale Peveto	Special teams	5	Southern Methodist (1987)
Corey Raymond	Defensive backs	2	LSU (1992)
Jeff Grimes	Offensive line	1	Texas - El Paso (1991)

== Depth chart ==
The official opening day depth chart was released on August 22, 2014.

Defense

FS
26 Ronald Martin, Sr
28 Jalen Mills, Jr
33 Jamal Adams, Fr

WLB	MIKE	SLB
4 Kwon Alexander, Jr	31 D.J. Welter, Sr	23 Lamar Louis, Jr
45 Deion Jones, Jr	52 Kendell Beckwith, So	40 Duke Riley, So
22 Ronnie Feist, Jr	3 Clifton Garrett, Fr	48 Donnie Alexander, Fr

SS
29 Rickey Jefferson, So
12 Corey Thompson, Jr
35 Devin Voorhies, Fr

CB
21 Rashard Robinson, So
24 Ed Paris, Fr
12 Corey Thompson, Jr

DE	DT	DT	DE
94 Danielle Hunter, Jr	91 Christian LaCouture, So	95 Quentin Thomas, Jr	59 Jermauria Rasco, Sr
92 Lewis Neal, So	90 Marquedis Bain, Fr	99 Greg Gilmore, Fr	46 Tashawn Bower, So
93 M.J. Patterson, Fr	57 Davon Godchaux, Fr	97 Frank Herron, Fr	98 Deondre Clark, Fr

CB
16 Tre'Davious White, So
32 Jalen Collins, Jr
39 Russell Gage, Fr

Offense

WR
83 Travin Dural, So
1 Quantavius Leslie, Sr
2 Avery Peterson, Fr

LT	LG	C	RG	RT
70 La'el Collins, Sr	74 Vadal Alexander, Jr	55 Elliott Porter, Sr	69 Fehoko Fanaika, Sr	65 Jerald Hawkins, So
71 Jonah Austin, Jr	63 K.J. Malone, Fr	77 Ethan Pocic, So	75 Evan Washington, Sr	76 Josh Boutte, So
⋅	⋅	72 Andy Dodd, Fr	⋅	67 Jevonte Domond, So

TE
85 Dillon Gordon, Jr
89 DeSean Smith, So
84 Logan Stokes, Sr

WR
9 John Diarse, Fr
15 Malachi Dupre, Fr
8 Trey Quinn, Fr

QB
10 Anthony Jennings, So
6 Brandon Harris, Fr
16 Brad Kragthorpe, Jr

FB
43 Connor Neighbors, Sr
49 Melvin Jones, So
31 Bennett Schiro, Fr

Special teams
PK 42 Colby Delahoussaye, So
PK 14 Trent Domingue, So
P 38 Jamie Keehn, So
KR 83 Travin Dural, So
PR 18 Terrence Magee, Sr

RB
18 Terrence Magee, Sr
7 Leonard Fournette, Fr
27 Kenny Hilliard, Sr

== Schedule ==
Date	Time	Opponent	Rank	Site	TV	Result	Attendance
August 30	8:00 p.m.	vs. No. 14 Wisconsin*	No. 13	NRG Stadium; Houston, TX (Texas Kickoff)	ESPN	W 28–24 (vacated)	71,599
September 6	6:30 p.m.	Sam Houston State*	No. 12	Tiger Stadium; Baton Rouge, LA	SECN	W 56–0 (vacated)	100,338
September 13	6:00 p.m.	Louisiana–Monroe*	No. 10	Tiger Stadium; Baton Rouge, LA	ESPNU	W 31–0 (vacated)	101,194
September 20	6:00 p.m.	Mississippi State	No. 8	Tiger Stadium; Baton Rouge, LA (rivalry)	ESPN	L 29–34	102,321
September 27	6:30 p.m.	New Mexico State*	No. 17	Tiger Stadium; Baton Rouge, LA	SECN	W 63–7 (vacated)	101,987
October 4	6:00 p.m.	at No. 5 Auburn	No. 15	Jordan–Hare Stadium; Auburn, AL (Tiger Bowl)	ESPN	L 7–41	87,451
October 11	6:30 p.m.	at Florida		Ben Hill Griffin Stadium; Gainesville, FL (rivalry)	SECN	W 30–27 (vacated)	88,014
October 18	6:30 p.m.	Kentucky		Tiger Stadium; Baton Rouge, LA	SECN	W 41–3 (vacated)	101,581
October 25	6:15 p.m.	No. 3 Ole Miss^{†}	No. 24	Tiger Stadium; Baton Rouge, LA (Magnolia Bowl) (College GameDay)	ESPN	W 10–7 (vacated)	102,321
November 8	7:00 p.m.	No. 5 Alabama	No. 16	Tiger Stadium; Baton Rouge, LA (rivalry / SEC Nation)	CBS	L 13–20 ^{OT}	102,321
November 15	7:00 p.m.	at Arkansas	No. 17	Donald W. Reynolds Razorback Stadium; Fayetteville, AR (Golden Boot)	ESPN2	L 0–17	70,165
November 27	6:30 p.m.	at Texas A&M		Kyle Field; College Station, TX (rivalry)	ESPN	W 23–17 (vacated)	105,829
December 30	2:00 p.m.	vs. Notre Dame*	No. 23	LP Field; Nashville, TN (Music City Bowl)	ESPN	L 28–31	60,149
*Non-conference game; ^{†}Homecoming; Rankings from AP Poll and CFP Rankings after October 28 released prior to game; All times are in Central time

Schedule source:

== Rankings ==
Ranking movements Legend: ██ Increase in ranking ██ Decrease in ranking — = Not ranked RV = Received votes ( ) = First-place votes
	Week																
Poll	Pre	1	2	3	4	5	6	7	8	9	10	11	12	13	14	15	Final
AP	13	12 (1)	10	8	17	15	RV	RV	24	16	14	20	RV	RV	23	22	RV
Coaches	13	12	9	8	18	15	RV	RV	23	17	15	20	RV	RV	24	23	RV
CFP	Not released									19	16	17	—	—	24	23	Not released

== Players drafted ==
Round	Pick	Player	Position	NFL team
2	42	Jalen Collins	Defensive back	Atlanta Falcons
3	88	Danielle Hunter	Defensive lineman	Minnesota Vikings
4	124	Kwon Alexander	Linebacker	Tampa Bay Buccaneers
7	235	Kenny Hilliard	Running back	Houston Texans
