= John Chavis (American football) =

American football player and coach (born 1956)

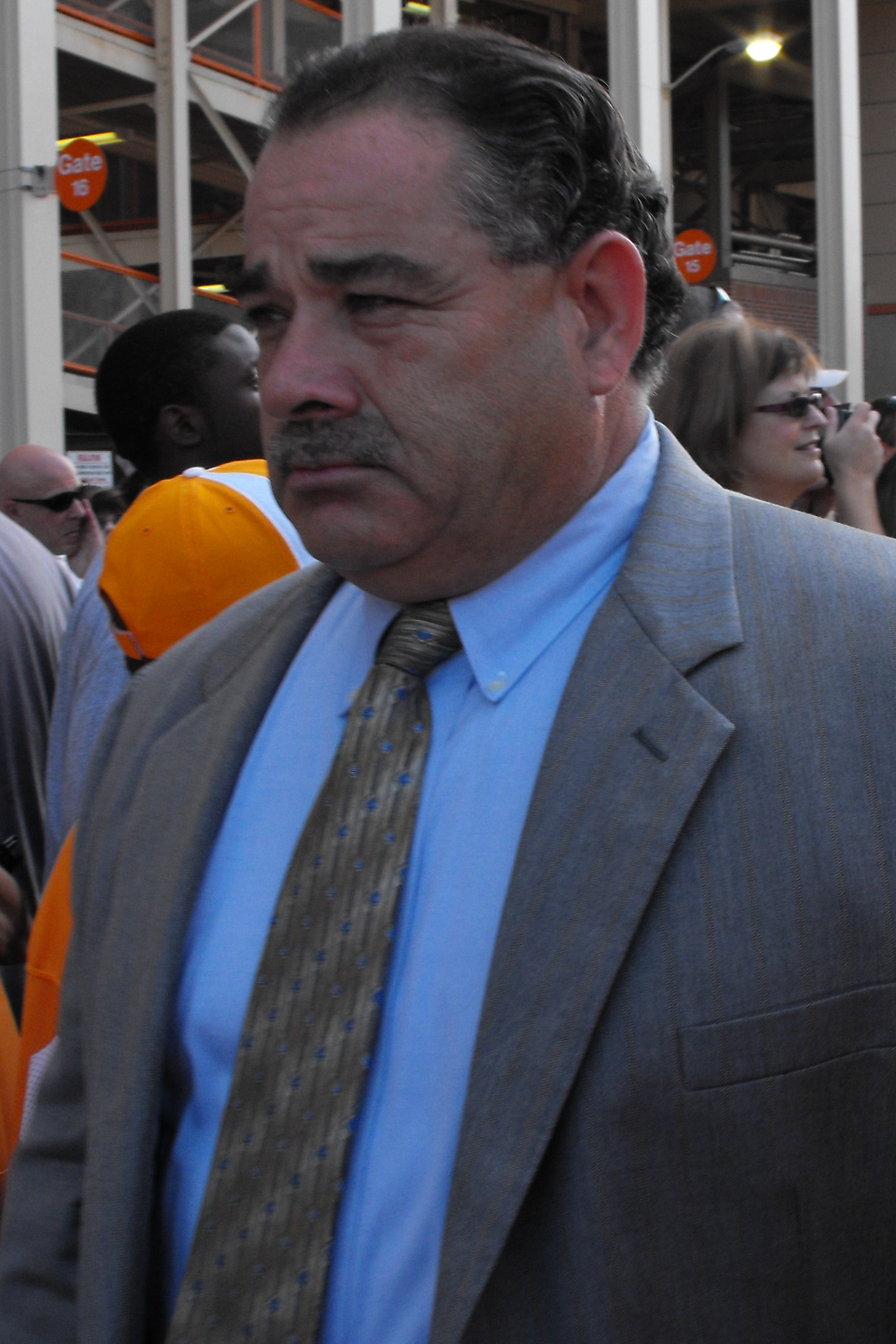

Biographical details
- Born: October 16, 1956 (age 70); Dillon, South Carolina, U.S.

Playing career
- 1976–1978: Tennessee
- Position: Nose tackle

Coaching career (HC unless noted)
- 1979: Tennessee (GA)
- 1980–1983: Alabama A&M (DL)
- 1984–1985: Alabama State (DC)
- 1986–1988: Alabama A&M (DC)
- 1989–1994: Tennessee (DL/LB)
- 1995–2008: Tennessee (DC/LB)
- 2009–2014: LSU (DC/LB)
- 2015–2017: Texas A&M (DC/LB)
- 2018–2019: Arkansas (DC/LB)
- 2022–2024: Birmingham Stallions (DC/LB)

Accomplishments and honors

Awards
- Broyles Award (2011)

Johnny Chavis (born October 16, 1956), nicknamed "the Chief", is an American college football coach who was most recently the defensive coordinator and linebackers coach for the Birmingham Stallions of the United Football League (UFL). He previously served as defensive coordinator for the Arkansas Razorbacks football team and former defensive coordinator, linebacker coach, and associate head coach at the Tennessee Volunteers football, LSU Tigers football, and Texas A&M Aggies football programs.

== Playing career ==
Chavis joined Tennessee's football squad as a walk-on defensive lineman. He played sparingly in 1976, picking up two tackles. He delivered an explosive performance in the 1977 Orange-and-White Game, and briefly pushed future All-SEC lineman Jim Noonan for the starting spot at middle guard. Playing as a backup to Noonan, Chavis registered 40 tackles (26 solo) and two sacks, and was awarded a scholarship at the end of the year. Prior to the 1978 season (his senior year), Chavis switched to defensive tackle, and was vaulted into the starting slot after Bill Christian suffered a season-ending knee injury. He finished the year with 32 tackles (19 solo).

During his playing career at UT, Chavis had 74 tackles (46 solo) and two sacks. He lettered in 1977 and 1978 and received his degree from the College of Education in 1979. He was initially served by coach Bill Battle, but spent his final two seasons served by Battle's replacement, Johnny Majors. His position coach was former Atlanta Falcons lineman Jim Dyar.

Chavis is a native of Dillon, South Carolina. He played high school football at Dillon High School under long-time coach Paul Chapman.

== Coaching career ==
=== Early career ===
Before returning to Tennessee (where he had briefly been a graduate assistant), Chavis had been defensive coordinator at Alabama A&M, a historically Black university. There he led the defense of the Division II school to the best defensive record in the nation. The Bulldogs ranked first in total defense in 1987 and 1988.

Before taking the defensive coordinator job at Alabama A&M, Chavis coached as a graduate assistant at Tennessee in 1979, as defensive line coach at Alabama A&M from 1980 to 1983 and then as defensive line coach and defensive coordinator at Alabama State in 1984–85.

=== Tennessee ===
Chavis returned to Tennessee in 1989 as defensive line and linebackers coach under his former college coach, Johnny Majors. He was promoted to defensive coordinator under Majors' successor, Phillip Fulmer, in 1995. Under Chavis' watch, Tennessee gained a reputation for fielding some of the stingiest defenses in the nation.

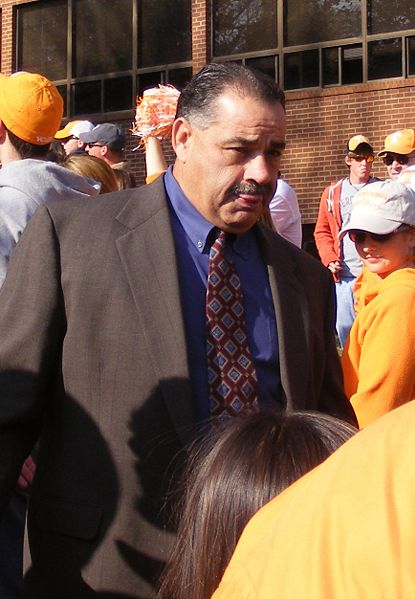
Chavis in 2007

Following the national championship season of 1998, Chavis was named the SEC's outstanding linebacker coach. Tennessee's defense led the SEC in 1996 and ranked in the top three five of the past seven years.

In addition to supervising linebackers and the overall defense, Chavis in 1999 was named assistant head coach.

Following the 2006 season, Chavis was named as the Assistant Football Coach of the Year by the American Football Coaches Association.

Chavis and other members of the staff saw increased pressure after a slow start to the 2007 season, including double-digit losses to California and Florida. Yet, the 2007 Tennessee team competed in the SEC Championship game against an LSU team that won the National Championship that year. In that SEC Championship game against LSU, the final score was 21 to 14, with 7 of LSU's points coming from an interception return for a touchdown. A year later Les Miles reached out to Chavis to become the defensive coordinator for LSU largely due to how impressed Miles was with Chief's defensive performance at the SEC Championship game. Chavis' career at Tennessee came to an end in the 2008 season. Following a 3–6 start and a loss to Steve Spurrier and South Carolina, Phillip Fulmer announced the following Monday that he, at the University's decision, would step down as head coach. Fulmer's resignation would ultimately oust Chavis as defensive coordinator. Chavis' final three games would bring confidence but major disappointment to his final days with Tennessee, starting with an embarrassing 13–7 loss to Wyoming which would keep Tennessee from making a bowl for the second time in four years. Though disappointing, Wyoming only had to move the ball 7 yards for those two scoring drives. Remarkably, Chavis' 2008 defense finished 3rd nationally and 1st in the SEC in Total Defense despite the 2008 Tennessee Total Offense ranking of 115th. Chavis would win his final game at Tennessee against the University of Kentucky, 28–10, continuing a 24-game win streak against the Wildcats.

"I look at their defense. Coach Chavis, he's done a great job for a long time." – Charlie Weis (Notre Dame Head Coach).

=== LSU ===
On January 5, 2009, Chavis was named the defensive coordinator at LSU. While with the Tigers, his defenses were consistently ranked among the nation's best. The 2011 LSU team finished the regular season undefeated which included a 9–6 overtime victory over Alabama. LSU played in the 2011 national championship game. Chief was the recipient of the 2011 Broyles Award as the best assistant coach in college football.

As of 2013, Chavis has seen 19 players that he's coached at LSU selected in the NFL draft, including five in the first round.

=== Texas A&M ===
The day of LSU's 2014 Music City Bowl loss to Notre Dame, Chavis turned down a three-year, $5.4 million offer from Les Miles. That same day, it was reported that Chavis had accepted an offer from Texas A&M to take their then vacant defensive coordinator position. He officially signed a contract to accept the position on February 12, 2015, which guaranteed him $1.5 million in 2015, $1.55 million in 2016 and $1.6 million in 2017, not including potential bonuses. After the 2017 season, Texas A&M fired head coach Kevin Sumlin, and hired Florida State head coach Jimbo Fisher. Fisher did not retain Chavis as defensive coordinator, instead hiring Mike Elko away from Notre Dame.

=== Arkansas ===
In January 2018, Chavis was hired to be the defensive coordinator for the Arkansas Razorbacks, under new head coach Chad Morris. Chavis was terminated for convenience following the 2019 season with a $1.25 million buyout.

=== Birmingham Stallions ===
In March 2022, it was announced that Chavis would be joining Skip Holtz's staff as the defensive coordinator for the Birmingham Stallions. He left the team on May 28, 2024.

== Family ==
Chavis and his wife, Diane Crisp Chavis, are the parents of two sons, C. John Chavis (age 46) and Jason Chavis (age 43).
