= 2014 Music City Bowl =

2014 Franklin American Mortgage Music City Bowl
- 17th Music City Bowl
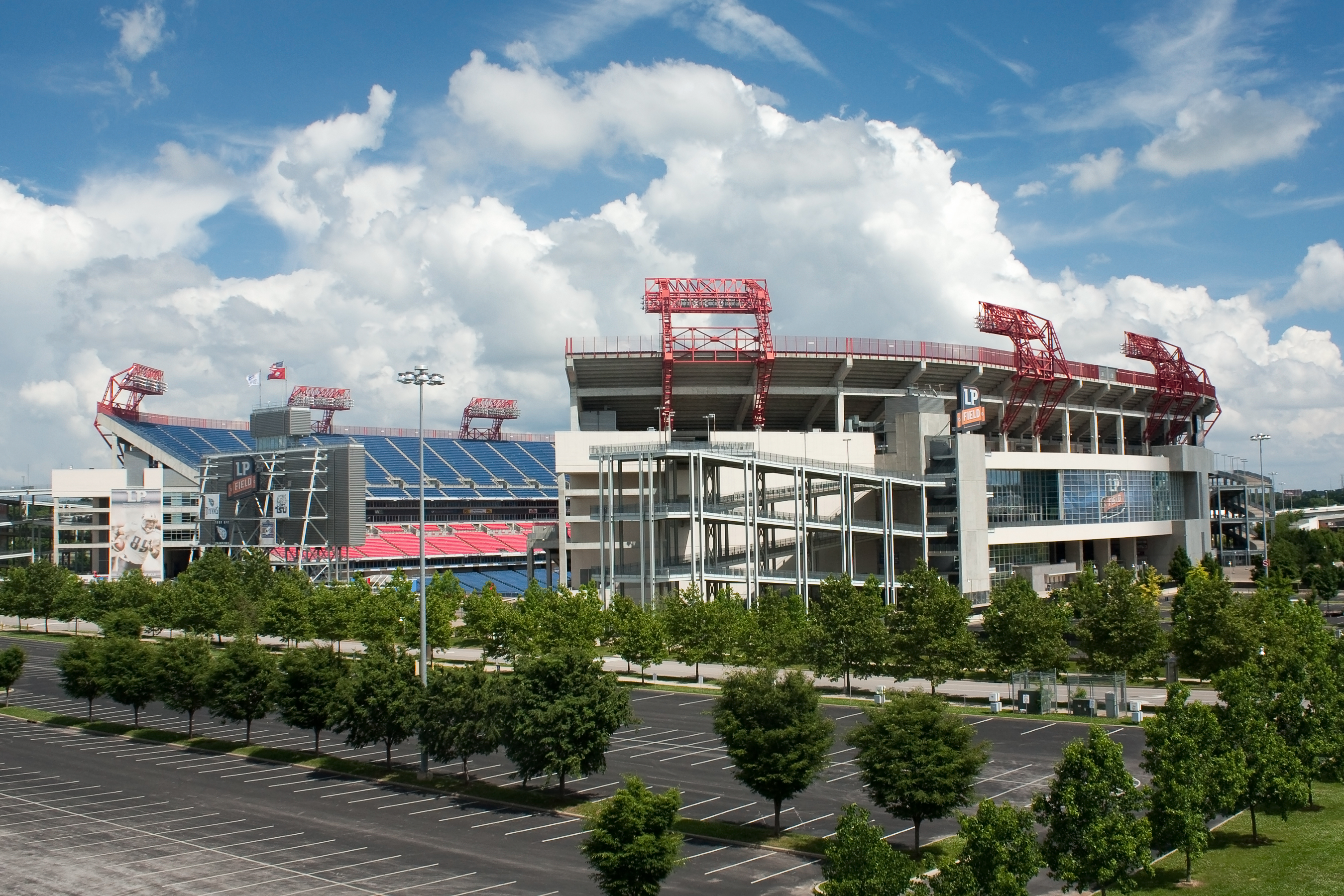
- LP Field in Nashville, Tennessee, hosted the Music City Bowl.
Notre Dame Fighting Irish	LSU Tigers
(7–5)	(8–4)
Independent	SEC
31	28
Head coach: Brian Kelly	Head coach: Les Miles
	AP / Coaches / CFP; 22 / 23 / 23
	1	2	3	4	Total
Notre Dame	7	14	7	3	31
LSU	7	7	14	0	28
- Date: December 30, 2014
- Season: 2014
- Stadium: LP Field
- Location: Nashville, Tennessee
- MVP: QB Malik Zaire, Notre Dame
- Favorite: LSU by 8.5
- National anthem: Jonathan Jackson
- Referee: Michael Batlan (Pac-12)
- Attendance: 60,419

United States TV coverage
- Network: ESPN; ESPN Radio
- Announcers: Mark Jones, Rod Gilmore, Jessica Mendoza (ESPN); Mark Neely, David Diaz-Infante, Dawn Davenport (ESPN Radio)

The 2014 Music City Bowl was an American college football bowl game played on December 30, 2014 at LP Field in Nashville, Tennessee. The 17th edition of the Music City Bowl began at approximately 2:00 p.m. CST and was broadcast nationally by ESPN. It featured the Notre Dame Fighting Irish, and the LSU Tigers from the SEC. It was one of the final 2014-15 bowl games of the 2014 FBS football season. The game was sponsored by the Franklin American Mortgage Company and is officially known as the Franklin American Mortgage Music City Bowl. Notre Dame defeated Louisiana State by a final score of 31–28.

== Teams ==
The game was the eleventh overall meeting between these two teams, with the series previously tied 5–5. The last time these two teams met was in 2006. It represented the third bowl game between these two teams; the previous bowls were the 1997 Independence Bowl and the 2007 Sugar Bowl.

== Game summary ==
=== Scoring summary ===
Scoring summary

Quarter	Time	Drive			Team	Scoring information	Score	
Quarter	Time	Plays	Yards	TOP	Team	Scoring information	ND	LSU
1	7:04	15	66	7:56	ND	Will Fuller 12-yard touchdown reception from Malik Zaire, Kyle Brindza kick good	7	0
1	0:05	8	76	2:36	LSU	Leonard Fournette 8-yard touchdown run, Trent Domingue kick good	7	7
2	11:04	11	75	4:01	ND	Malik Zaire 7-yard touchdown run, Kyle Brindza kick good	14	7
2	10:52	–	–	–	LSU	Kickoff returned 100 yards for touchdown by Leonard Fournette, Trent Domingue kick good	14	14
2	6:12	10	59	4:40	ND	Tarean Folston 6-yard touchdown run, Kyle Brindza kick good	21	14
3	14:46	1	75	0:14	LSU	John Diarse 75-yard touchdown reception from Anthony Jennings, Trent Domingue kick good	21	21
3	6:14	1	89	0:12	LSU	Leonard Fournette 89-yard touchdown run, Trent Domingue kick good	21	28
3	4:15	4	67	1:59	ND	C. J. Prosise 50-yard touchdown run, Kyle Brindza kick good	28	28
4	0:00	14	71	5:41	ND	32-yard field goal by Kyle Brindza	31	28
"TOP" = time of possession. For other American football terms, see Glossary of American football.							31	28

=== Statistics ===
Statistics	ND	LSU
First downs	23	17
Plays–yards	69–448	52–436
Rushes–yards	51–263	38–285
Passing yards	185	151
Passing: Comp–Att–Int	18–26–0	7–14–0
Time of possession	37:00	23:00
