= 2014 Notre Dame Fighting Irish football team =

American college football season

2014 Notre Dame Fighting Irish football

Music City Bowl champion

Music City Bowl, W 31–28 vs. LSU
- Conference: Independent
- Record: 8–5
- Head coach: Brian Kelly (5th season)
- Offensive coordinator: Mike Denbrock (1st season)
- Offensive scheme: Spread
- Defensive coordinator: Brian VanGorder (1st season)
- Base defense: 3–4 multiple
- MVP: Joe Schmidt
- Captains: Cam McDaniel; Nick Martin; Austin Collinsworth; Sheldon Day
- Home stadium: Notre Dame Stadium

2014 NCAA Division I FBS independents football records
| | Conf. | | | Overall |
| Team | W | | L | W | | L |
|---|---|---|---|---|---|---|
| BYU | | – | | 8 | – | 5 |
| Notre Dame | | – | | 8 | – | 5 |
| Navy | | – | | 8 | – | 5 |
| Army | | – | | 4 | – | 8 |
Rankings from AP Poll

The 2014 Notre Dame Fighting Irish football team was an American football team that represented the University of Notre Dame as an independent during the 2014 NCAA Division I FBS football season. In their fifth year under head coach Brian Kelly, the Irish compiled an 8–5 record and outscored opponents 427 to 379. They began the season 6–0 and were ranked as high as No. 5 in the AP and Coaches Polls, but went 1–5 in the second half of the regular season. Notre Dame's defense suffered significant injuries and yielded more than 41 points per game in those six games. For the first time in school history, the Irish gave up 30 or more points in seven consecutive contests.

The Irish finished on a high note, upsetting No. 22 LSU in the Music City Bowl, 31–28, as Kyle Brindza kicked a game-winning field goal as time expired. This was Notre Dame's first win over a ranked opponent in a bowl game since 1993.

The team's statistical leaders included quarterback Everett Golson (3,445 passing yards), running back Tarean Folston (889 rushing yards), wide receiver William Fuller (76 receptions for 1,094 yards), linebacker Jaylon Smith (112 total tackles), and kicker Kyle Brindza (93 points scored). Middle linebacker Joe Schmidt was selected as the team's most valuable player.

The team played its home games at Notre Dame Stadium in Notre Dame, Indiana.

== Schedule ==
| Date | Time | Opponent | Rank | Site | TV | Result | Attendance |
|---|---|---|---|---|---|---|---|
| August 30 | 3:30 p.m. | Rice | No. 17 | Notre Dame Stadium; Notre Dame, IN | NBC | W 48–17 | 80,795 |
| September 6 | 7:30 p.m. | Michigan | No. 16 | Notre Dame Stadium; Notre Dame, IN (rivalry) | NBC | W 31–0 | 80,795 |
| September 13 | 7:30 p.m. | vs. Purdue | No. 11 | Lucas Oil Stadium; Indianapolis, IN (Shamrock Series, rivalry) | NBC | W 30–14 | 56,832 |
| September 27 | 8:00 p.m. | vs. Syracuse | No. 8 | MetLife Stadium; East Rutherford, NJ | ABC | W 31–15 | 76,802 |
| October 4 | 3:30 p.m. | No. 14 Stanford | No. 9 | Notre Dame Stadium; Notre Dame, IN (rivalry) | NBC | W 17–14 | 80,795 |
| October 11 | 3:30 p.m. | North Carolina | No. 6 | Notre Dame Stadium; Notre Dame, IN (rivalry) | NBC | W 50–43 | 80,795 |
| October 18 | 8:00 p.m. | at No. 2 Florida State | No. 5 | Doak Campbell Stadium; Tallahassee, FL (rivalry, College Gameday) | ABC | L 27–31 | 82,431 |
| November 1 | 8:00 p.m. | vs. Navy | No. 10 | FedExField; Landover, MD (rivalry) | CBS | W 49–39 | 36,807 |
| November 8 | 3:30 p.m. | at No. 9 Arizona State | No. 10 | Sun Devil Stadium; Tempe, AZ | ABC | L 31–55 | 65,870 |
| November 15 | 3:30 p.m. | Northwestern | No. 18 | Notre Dame Stadium; Notre Dame, IN (rivalry) | NBC | L 40–43 ^{OT} | 80,795 |
| November 22 | 3:30 p.m. | No. 24 Louisville | | Notre Dame Stadium; Notre Dame, IN | NBC | L 28–31 | 80,795 |
| November 29 | 3:30 p.m. | at USC | | Los Angeles Memorial Coliseum; Los Angeles, CA (rivalry) | FOX | L 14–49 | 79,586 |
| December 30 | 3:00 p.m. | vs. No. 23 LSU | | LP Field; Nashville, TN (Music City Bowl) | ESPN | W 31–28 | 60,149 |
Rankings from AP Poll and CFP Rankings after October 28 released prior to game; All times are in Eastern time

== Before the season ==
From the 2013 team that won nine games, the Irish lost offensive tackle Zack Martin || Offensive tackle, defensiv end Stephon Tuitt, tight end Troy Niklas, defensive tackle Louis Nix, offensive guard Chris Watt, and linebacker Prince Shembo in the first four rounds of the 2014 NFL draft.

Florida defensive back Cody Riggs transferred to Notre Dame for his final season of eligibility.

There were also several changes to the coaching staff. Assistant coach Chuck Martin left to become the head coach of the Miami RedHawks. Bob Diaco departed to become the head coach of the Connecticut Huskies. Brian VanGorder, formerly the linebackers coach of the NFL's New York Jets, was hired to be the new defensive coordinator and linebackers coach. Matt LaFleur, formerly the quarterbacks coach of the NFL's Washington Redskins, was hired to be the new quarterbacks coach. Mike Denbrock was promoted to offensive coordinator, filling the void left by Martin.

== Rankings ==
Ranking movements Legend: ██ Increase in ranking ██ Decrease in ranking — = Not ranked RV = Received votes
| | Week | | | | | | | | | | | | | | | | |
| Poll | Pre | 1 | 2 | 3 | 4 | 5 | 6 | 7 | 8 | 9 | 10 | 11 | 12 | 13 | 14 | 15 | Final |
|---|---|---|---|---|---|---|---|---|---|---|---|---|---|---|---|---|---|
| AP | 17 | 16 | 11 | 9 | 8 | 9 | 6 | 5 | 7 | 6 | 8 | 15 | RV | — | — | — | RV |
| Coaches | 17 | 15 | 11 | 9 | 8 | 8 | 5 | 5 | 8 | 7 | 8 | 16 | RV | RV | — | — | RV |
| CFP | Not released | | | | | | | | | 10 | 10 | 18 | — | — | — | — | Not released |

== Game summaries ==
=== Rice ===
Rice at Notre Dame

| Team | 1 | 2 | 3 | 4 | Total |
|---|---|---|---|---|---|
| Owls | 7 | 3 | 0 | 7 | 17 |
| • No. 17 Fighting Irish | 14 | 14 | 10 | 10 | 48 |

- Date: August 30, 2014
- Location: Notre Dame Stadium
  South Bend, IN
- Game start: 3:42 p.m. EDT
- Elapsed time: 3 hours and 7 minutes
- Game attendance: 80,795
- Game weather: Temperature: 82 °F (28 °C) • Weather: Cloudy and Possible Rain • Wind: SW 17 MPH
- Referee: Jeff Heaser
- TV announcers (NBC): Dan Hicks, Mike Mayock, Kathryn Tappen, and Doug Flutie (sidelines)

Scoring summary
| 1 | 6:02 | ND | Everett Golson 11-yard touchdown run, Kyle Brindza kick good | ND 7–0 |
| 1 | 2:13 | Rice | Zach Wright 26-yard touchdown reception from Driphus Jackson, James Hairston kick good | Tied 7–7 |
| 1 | 2:01 | ND | William Fuller 75-yard touchdown reception from Golson, Brindza kick good | ND 14–7 |
| 2 | 5:51 | Rice | 33-yard field goal by Hairston | ND 14–10 |
| 2 | 2:33 | ND | Golson 14-yard touchdown run, Brindza kick good | ND 21–10 |
| 2 | 0:05 | ND | C. J. Prosise 53-yard touchdown reception from Golson, Brindza kick good | ND 28–10 |
| 3 | 4:07 | ND | 36-yard field goal by Brindza | ND 31–10 |
| 3 | 0:17 | ND | Golson 4-yard touchdown run, Brindza kick good | ND 38–10 |
| 4 | 7:47 | ND | 29-yard field goal by Brindza | ND 41–10 |
| 4 | 4:57 | Rice | James Mayden 53-yard touchdown reception from Tyler Stehling, Hairston kick good | ND 41–17 |
| 4 | 3:32 | ND | Greg Bryant 17-yard touchdown run, Brindza kick good | ND 48–17 |

=== Michigan ===
Michigan at Notre Dame
(rivalry)

| Team | 1 | 2 | 3 | 4 | Total |
|---|---|---|---|---|---|
| Wolverines | 0 | 0 | 0 | 0 | 0 |
| • No. 16 Fighting Irish | 7 | 14 | 7 | 3 | 31 |

- Date: September 6, 2014
- Location: Notre Dame Stadium
  South Bend, IN
- Game start: 7:42 p.m. EDT
- Elapsed time: 3 hours and 17 minutes
- Game attendance: 80,795
- Game weather: Temperature: 70 °F (21 °C) • Weather: Clear Skies • Wind: NNW 10 MPH
- Referee: John O'Neill
- TV announcers (NBC): Dan Hicks, Mike Mayock, Kathryn Tappen, and Doug Flutie (sidelines)

Scoring summary
| 1 | 1:50 | ND | Cam McDaniel 1-yard touchdown run, Kyle Brindza kick good | ND 7–0 |
| 2 | 3:58 | ND | Amir Carlisle 1-yard touchdown reception from Everett Golson, Brindza kick good | ND 14–0 |
| 2 | 0:34 | ND | William Fuller 24-yard touchdown reception from Golson, Brindza kick good | ND 21–0 |
| 3 | 3:02 | ND | Carlisle 12-yard touchdown reception from Golson, Brindza kick good | ND 28–0 |
| 4 | 12:03 | ND | 43-yard field goal by Brindza | ND 31–0 |

In what looks to be the final meeting between Notre Dame and Michigan, Notre Dame defeated Michigan, 31–0, giving the Irish their most lopsided win against the Wolverines. The game ended Michigan's NCAA record of consecutive games without being shut out. (The Wolverines were last shut out in 1984 versus Iowa). Michigan turned the ball over four times, while Notre Dame had no turnovers. Michigan never reached the red zone in this game. Everett Golson went 23 for 34, throwing for 226 yards and three touchdowns for the Irish. Notre Dame went to 2–0 on the year.

=== Purdue ===
Notre Dame vs Purdue
(Shillelagh Trophy / Shamrock Series)

| Team | 1 | 2 | 3 | 4 | Total |
|---|---|---|---|---|---|
| Boilermakers | 7 | 7 | 0 | 0 | 14 |
| • No. 11 Fighting Irish | 7 | 10 | 7 | 6 | 30 |

- Date: September 13, 2014
- Location: Lucas Oil Stadium
  Indianapolis, IN
- Game start: 7:41 p.m. EDT
- Elapsed time: 3 hours and 28 minutes
- Game attendance: 56,832
- Game weather: Temperature: 61 °F (16 °C) • Weather: Partly Cloudy • Wind: N 6 MPH
- Referee: Jerry McGinn
- TV announcers (NBC): Tom Hammond, Mike Mayock, Kathryn Tappen, and Doug Flutie (sidelines)

Scoring summary
| 1 | 12:23 | ND | Will Fuller 16-yard touchdown reception from Everett Golson, Kyle Brindza kick good | ND 7–0 |
| 1 | 1:50 | PUR | Brandon Cottom 7-yard touchdown reception from Danny Etling, Paul Griggs kick good | Tied 7–7 |
| 2 | 11:57 | ND | 19-yard field goal by Brindza | ND 10–7 |
| 2 | 3:00 | PUR | DeAngelo Yancey 19-yard touchdown reception from Etling, Griggs kick good | PUR 14–10 |
| 2 | 0:13 | ND | Golson 15-yard touchdown run, Brindza kick good | ND 17–14 |
| 3 | 4:05 | ND | Corey Robinson 15-yard touchdown reception from Golson, Brindza kick good | ND 24–14 |
| 4 | 9:31 | ND | 48-yard field goal by Brindza | ND 27–14 |
| 4 | 5:30 | ND | 39-yard field goal by Brindza | ND 30–14 |

=== Syracuse ===
Notre Dame vs Syracuse

| Team | 1 | 2 | 3 | 4 | Total |
|---|---|---|---|---|---|
| • No. 8 Fighting Irish | 0 | 14 | 7 | 10 | 31 |
| Orange | 0 | 3 | 0 | 12 | 15 |

- Date: September 27, 2014
- Location: MetLife Stadium
  East Rutherford, NJ
- Game start: 8:00 p.m. EDT
- Elapsed time: 3 hours and 45 minutes
- Game attendance: 76,802
- Game weather: Temperature: 70 °F (21 °C) • Weather: Sunny • Wind: Mild
- Referee: Jerry Magallanes
- TV announcers (ABC): Chris Fowler, Kirk Herbstreit, and Heather Cox (sideline)

Scoring summary
| 2 | 10:56 | ND | Will Fuller 23-yard touchdown reception from Everett Golson, Kyle Brindza kick good | ND 7–0 |
| 2 | 8:31 | ND | Fuller 72-yard touchdown reception from Golson, Brindza kick good | ND 14–0 |
| 2 | 3:07 | SU | 38-yard field goal by Cole Murphy | ND 14–3 |
| 3 | 9:39 | ND | Corey Robinson 8-yard touchdown reception from Golson, Brindza kick good | ND 21–3 |
| 4 | 14:54 | SU | Terrel Hunt 7-yard touchdown run, Murphy kick blocked | ND 21–9 |
| 4 | 10:19 | ND | Torri Hunter Jr. 13-yard touchdown reception from Golson, Brindza kick good | ND 28–9 |
| 4 | 5:09 | SU | Durell Eskridge 29-yard touchdown interception return, Hunt pass failed | ND 28–15 |
| 4 | 1:57 | ND | 37-yard field goal by Brindza | ND 31–15 |

=== Stanford ===
Stanford at Notre Dame
(Legends Trophy)

| Team | 1 | 2 | 3 | 4 | Total |
|---|---|---|---|---|---|
| No. 14 Cardinal | 7 | 0 | 0 | 7 | 14 |
| • No. 9 Fighting Irish | 0 | 7 | 0 | 10 | 17 |

- Date: October 4, 2014
- Location: Notre Dame Stadium
  South Bend, IN
- Game start: 3:40 p.m. EDT
- Elapsed time: 3 hours and 28 minutes
- Game attendance: 80,795
- Game weather: Temperature: 41 °F (5 °C) • Weather: Cloudy and Rain Likely • Wind: SW 15 MPH
- Referee: Terry Leyden
- TV announcers (NBC): Dan Hicks, Mike Mayock, Kathryn Tappen, and Doug Flutie (sidelines)

Scoring summary
| 1 | 3:50 | Stanford | Kevin Hogan 10-yard touchdown run, Jordan Williamson kick good | Stanford 7–0 |
| 2 | 3:06 | ND | Chris Brown 17-yard touchdown reception from Everett Golson, Kyle Brindza kick good | Tied 7–7 |
| 4 | 7:32 | ND | 45-yard field goal by Brindza | ND 10–7 |
| 4 | 3:01 | Stanford | Remound Wright 11-yard touchdown run, Williamson kick good | Stanford 14–10 |
| 4 | 1:01 | ND | Ben Koyack 23-yard touchdown reception from Golson, Brindza kick good | ND 17–14 |

With 1:09 left in the game and Notre Dame facing a 4th and 11 from Stanford's 23 yard line, Everett Golson finds a wide open Ben Koyack in the corner of the endzone to lift Notre Dame over Stanford 17–14. Stanford, the country's number one defense, had been giving up just 198 total yards of offense a game, but Notre Dame piled up 370 yards. Despite the Irish offense moving the ball, multiple mistakes including botched field goal snaps and turnovers in the red zone kept the game close throughout. Notre Dame's defense was dominant, giving up just 204 total yards and had two interceptions. Further, the Irish defense held Stanford to 47 yards rushing – Stanford's fewest rush yards in a game since 2007. With the win, Notre Dame moves to 5–0.

=== North Carolina ===
North Carolina at Notre Dame

| Team | 1 | 2 | 3 | 4 | Total |
|---|---|---|---|---|---|
| Tar Heels | 14 | 12 | 10 | 7 | 43 |
| • No. 6 Fighting Irish | 7 | 21 | 7 | 15 | 50 |

- Date: October 11, 2014
- Location: Notre Dame Stadium
  South Bend, IN
- Game start: 3:40 p.m. EDT
- Elapsed time: 3 hours and 44 minutes
- Game attendance: 80,795
- Game weather: Temperature: 59 °F (15 °C) • Weather: Sunny • Wind: NNW 4 MPH
- Referee: Jeff Flanagan
- TV announcers (NBC): Dan Hicks, Mike Mayock, Kathryn Tappen, and Doug Flutie (sidelines)

Scoring summary
| 1 | 13:28 | NC | Elijah Hood 6-yard touchdown run, Nick Weiler kick good | NC 7–0 |
| 1 | 8:48 | NC | Jeff Schoettmer 29-yard touchdown interception return, Weiler kick good | NC 14–0 |
| 1 | 7:09 | ND | William Fuller 13-yard touchdown reception from Everett Golson, Kyle Brindza kick good | NC 14–7 |
| 2 | 14:57 | ND | Cam McDaniel 1-yard touchdown run, Brindza kick good | Tied 14–14 |
| 2 | 9:56 | ND | Greg Bryant 7-yard touchdown run, Brindza kick good | ND 21–14 |
| 2 | 4:16 | NC | Marquise Williams 3-yard touchdown run, Weiler kick blocked | ND 21–20 |
| 2 | 2:25 | ND | Tarean Folston 6-yard run, Brindza kick good | ND 28–20 |
| 2 | 1:20 | NC | Quinshad Davis 20-yard touchdown reception from Williams, Williams pass failed | ND 28–26 |
| 3 | 11:52 | ND | Folston 9-yard touchdown reception by Golson, Brindza kick good | ND 35–26 |
| 3 | 3:37 | NC | 19-yard field goal by Weiler | ND 35–29 |
| 3 | 3:11 | NC | Williams 23-yard touchdown reception from Davis, Weiler kick good | NC 36–35 |
| 4 | 10:39 | ND | Folston 9-yard touchdown reception from Golson, Golson pass to Ben Koyack | ND 43–36 |
| 4 | 2:19 | ND | Folston 6-yard touchdown run, Brindza kick good | ND 50–36 |
| 4 | 0:47 | NC | Mack Hollins 18-yard touchdown reception from Williams, Weiler kick good | ND 50–43 |

The 6th ranked Irish held off the North Carolina Tar Heels to win in a shootout 50–43. After trailing 14–0 in the 1st, the Irish found some rhythm to score 21 points in a row to take a 21–14 lead. The win marked the first time the Irish put up 50 points against a non-academy team since beating Stanford 57–7 in 2003.

=== Florida State ===
Notre Dame at Florida State
(rivalry)

| Team | 1 | 2 | 3 | 4 | Total |
|---|---|---|---|---|---|
| No. 5 Fighting Irish | 7 | 10 | 7 | 3 | 27 |
| • No. 2 Seminoles | 7 | 3 | 14 | 7 | 31 |

- Date: October 18, 2014
- Location: Doak Campbell Stadium
  Tallahassee, FL
- Game start: 8:24 p.m. EDT
- Elapsed time: 3 hours and 27 minutes
- Game attendance: 82,431
- Game weather: Temperature: 72 °F (22 °C) • Weather: Clear and 68% Humidity • Wind: WNW 3 MPH
- Referee: David Epperley
- TV announcers (ABC): Chris Fowler, Kirk Herbstreit, Heather Cox, and Tom Rinaldi (sidelines)

The Irish, who were double digit underdogs, looked to score the game-winning touchdown with :13 left after Everett Golson found a wide open Corey Robinson in the endzone. But the Irish were flagged for a pass interference penalty which took the touchdown away and pushed Notre Dame back 10 yards. Irish turned the ball over on the next play. The penalty was considered controversial by some in a game many consider the game of the year between two top 5 teams. Everett Golson showed why many consider him a Heisman candidate by completing 31 of 52 passes for 313 yards and throwing for 3 touchdowns.

=== Navy ===
Notre Dame vs Navy
(Rip Miller Trophy)

| Team | 1 | 2 | 3 | 4 | Total |
|---|---|---|---|---|---|
| • No. 6 Fighting Irish | 14 | 14 | 0 | 21 | 49 |
| Midshipmen | 7 | 10 | 14 | 8 | 39 |

- Date: November 1, 2014
- Location: FedExField
  Landover, MD
- Game start: 8:10 p.m. EDT
- Elapsed time: 3 hours and 25 minutes
- Game attendance: 36,807
- Game weather: Temperature: 48 °F (9 °C) • Weather: Cloudy • Wind: SW 12 MPH
- Referee: Ron Cherry
- TV announcers (CBS): Andrew Catalon, Aaron Taylor, and Jamie Erdahl (sideline)

=== Arizona State ===
Notre Dame at Arizona State

| Team | 1 | 2 | 3 | 4 | Total |
|---|---|---|---|---|---|
| No. 8 Fighting Irish | 3 | 7 | 7 | 14 | 31 |
| • No. 11 Sun Devils | 17 | 17 | 0 | 21 | 55 |

- Date: November 8, 2014
- Location: Sun Devil Stadium
  Tempe, AZ
- Game start: 1:30 p.m. MST
- Elapsed time: 3 hours and 35 minutes
- Game attendance: 65,870
- Game weather: Temperature: 85 °F (29 °C) • Weather: Sunny and Clear Skies • Wind: Calm
- Referee: Jeff Heaser
- TV announcers (ABC): Sean McDonough, Chris Spielman, and Todd McShay (sideline)

1st quarter scoring: ND – Kyle Brindza 46-yard field goal; ASU – Zane Gonzalez, 47-yard field goal; ASU – Jaelen Strong 13-yard pass from Taylor Kelly (Gonzalez kick); ASU – Demario Richard 1-yard run (Gonzalez kick)

2nd quarter scoring: ASU – Damarious Randall 59-yard interception (Gonzalez kick); ASU – Cameron Smith 43-yard pass from Kelly (Gonzalez kick); ASU – Gonzalez, 28-yard field goal; ND – Will Fuller 9-yard pass from Everett Golden (Brindza kick)

3rd quarter scoring:

=== Northwestern ===
Northwestern at Notre Dame
(rivalry)

| Team | 1 | 2 | 3 | 4 | OT | Total |
|---|---|---|---|---|---|---|
| • Wildcats | 9 | 14 | 3 | 14 | 3 | 43 |
| No. 15 Fighting Irish | 20 | 7 | 7 | 6 | 0 | 40 |

- Date: November 15, 2014
- Location: Notre Dame Stadium
  South Bend, IN
- Game start: 3:39 p.m. EST
- Elapsed time: 4 hours and 12 minutes
- Game attendance: 80,795
- Game weather: Temperature: 29 °F (−2 °C) • Weather: Cloudy and Cold • Wind: SSW 9 MPH
- Referee: Mike Cannon
- TV announcers (NBC): Dan Hicks, Doug Flutie, Mike Mayock, and Kathryn Tappen (sideline)

=== Louisville ===
Louisville at Notre Dame

| Team | 1 | 2 | 3 | 4 | Total |
|---|---|---|---|---|---|
| • Cardinals | 14 | 3 | 7 | 7 | 31 |
| Fighting Irish | 3 | 3 | 14 | 8 | 28 |

- Date: November 22, 2014
- Location: Notre Dame Stadium
  South Bend, IN
- Game start: 3:40 p.m. EST
- Elapsed time: 3 hours and 19 minutes
- Game attendance: 80,795
- Game weather: Temperature: 45 °F (7 °C) • Weather: Showers • Wind: SSW 17 MPH
- Referee: Gary Patterson
- TV announcers (NBC): Dan Hicks, Doug Flutie, Mike Mayock, and Kathryn Tappen (sideline)

For the first time in the history of Notre Dame football, the Irish gave up 30 or more points in six straight games. And for the second week in a row, a missed field goal by kicker Kyle Brindza late in the game doomed the Irish. Notre Dame was 1–4 in the last 5 games after starting the season 6–0.

=== USC ===
Notre Dame at USC
(Jeweled Shillelagh)

| Team | 1 | 2 | 3 | 4 | Total |
|---|---|---|---|---|---|
| Fighting Irish | 0 | 7 | 7 | 0 | 14 |
| • Trojans | 21 | 14 | 14 | 0 | 49 |

- Date: November 29, 2014
- Location: Los Angeles Memorial Coliseum
  Los Angeles, CA
- Game start: 12:37 p.m. PST
- Elapsed time: 3 hours and 14 minutes
- Game attendance: 79,586
- Game weather: Temperature: 69 °F (21 °C) • Weather: Hazy and Sunny • Wind: ESE 6 MPH
- Referee: Dennis Hennigan
- TV announcers (Fox): Gus Johnson, Charles Davis, and Molly McGrath (sideline)

=== LSU (Music City Bowl) ===
Notre Dame vs LSU
(Music City Bowl)

| Team | 1 | 2 | 3 | 4 | Total |
|---|---|---|---|---|---|
| • Fighting Irish | 7 | 14 | 7 | 3 | 31 |
| No. 23 Tigers | 7 | 7 | 14 | 0 | 28 |

- Date: December 30, 2014
- Location: LP Field
  Nashville, TN
- Game start: 2:03 p.m. CST
- Elapsed time: 3 hours and 5 minutes
- Game attendance: 60,419
- Game weather: Temperature: 42 °F (6 °C) • Weather: Scattered Clouds • Wind: N 5 MPH
- Referee: Mike Batlan
- TV announcers (ESPN/ESPN Radio): Mark Jones, Rod Gilmore and Jessica Mendoza (sideline)/Mark Neely, David Diaz-Infante, and Dawn Davenport (sideline)

== Personnel ==
2014 Notre Dame Fighting Irish football team roster
Players
Coaches
Offense

| Pos. | # | Name | Class |
|---|---|---|---|
| RB | 1 | Greg Bryant | So |
| WR | 2 | Chris Brown | Jr |
| WR | 3 | Amir Carlisle | Sr |
| QB | 5 | Everett Golson | Sr |
| QB | 6 | Charlie Fiessinger | Sr |
| WR | 7 | William Fuller | So |
| QB | 8 | Malik Zaire | So |
| TE | 9 | Mike Heuerman | So |
| WR | 10 | DaVaris Daniels | Sr |
| WR | 11 | Justin Brent | Fr |
| TE | 13 | Tyler Luatua | Fr |
| QB | 14 | DeShone Kizer | Fr |
| WR | 15 | Corey Holmes | Fr |
| WR | 16 | Torii Hunter Jr. | So |
| TE | 18 | Ben Koyack | Sr |
| QB | 19 | Montgomery VanGorder | Fr |
| WR | 20 | C.J. Prosise | Jr |
| RB | 25 | Tarean Folston | So |
| WR | 32 | Cam Bryan | Jr |
| RB | 33 | Cam McDaniel | Sr |
| WR | 35 | Grant Hammann | Fr |
| WR | 37 | Eric Lee | Sr |
| RB | 46 | Josh Anderson | Jr |
| RB | 49 | Tyler Plantz | GS |
| OL | 53 | Sam Mustipher | Fr |
| OL | 56 | Quenton Nelson | Fr |
| OL | 60 | John Montelus | So |
| OL | 62 | Colin McGovern | So |
| OL | 63 | Sam Bush | Fr |
| OL | 65 | Conor Hanratty | Sr |
| OL | 67 | Jimmy Byrne | Fr |
| OL | 68 | Mike McGlinchey | So |
| OL | 70 | Hunter Bivin | So |
| OL | 71 | Alex Bars | Fr |
| OL | 72 | Nick Martin | Sr |
| OL | 74 | Christian Lombard | GS |
| OL | 75 | Mark Harrell | Jr |
| OL | 77 | Matt Hegarty | Sr |
| OL | 78 | Ronnie Stanley | Jr |
| OL | 79 | Steve Elmer | So |
| TE | 80 | Durham Smythe | So |
| WR | 81 | Omar Hunter | So |
| TE | 82 | Nic Weishar | Fr |
| WR | 83 | Austin Webster | Fr |
| TE | 84 | Ben Suttman | So |
| WR | 86 | Buster Sheridan | So |
| WR | 87 | Keenan Centlivre | Fr |
| WR | 88 | Corey Robinson | So |

Defense

| Pos. | # | Name | Class |
|---|---|---|---|
| CB | 2 | Cody Riggs | GS |
| S | 4 | Eilar Hardy | Sr |
| LB | 5 | Nyles Morgan | Fr |
| CB | 6 | KeiVarae Russell | Jr |
| LB | 8 | Kendall Moore | GS |
| LB | 9 | Jaylon Smith | So |
| S | 10 | Max Redfield | So |
| DL | 11 | Ishaq Williams | Sr |
| CB | 12 | Devin Butler | So |
| LB | 17 | James Onwualu | So |
| CB | 19 | Nick Watkins | Fr |
| CB | 21 | Jalen Brown | Sr |
| S | 22 | Elijah Shumate | Jr |
| S | 23 | Drue Tranquill | Fr |
| CB | 24 | Josh Atkinson | Sr |
| S | 28 | Austin Collinsworth | GS |
| S | 29 | Nicky Baratti | Jr |
| LB | 30 | Ben Councell | Sr |
| LB | 31 | John Turner | Jr |
| DL | 33 | Jhonny Williams | Fr |
| CB | 34 | Jesse Bongiovi | So |
| CB | 36 | Cole Luke | So |
| S | 37 | Ernie Soto | Sr |
| LB | 38 | Joe Schmidt | Sr |
| S | 39 | Drew Recker | So |
| CB | 41 | Matthias Farley | Sr |
| LB | 42 | Michael Deeb | So |
| LB | 43 | Kolin Hill | Fr |
| LB | 44 | Doug Randolph | So |
| DL | 45 | Romeo Okwara | Jr |
| S | 46 | Eamon McOsker | Jr |
| CB | 47 | Connor Cavalaris | Sr |
| LB | 48 | Greer Martini | Fr |
| S | 49 | Tyler Price | So |
| DL | 50 | Chase Hounshell | Sr |
| LB | 52 | Austin Larkin | So |
| DL | 53 | Justin Utupo | GS |
| DL | 55 | Jonathan Bonner | Fr |
| DL | 56 | Anthony Rabasa | Sr |
| LB | 59 | Jarrett Grace | Sr |
| DL | 64 | Ryan Kilander | Fr |
| DL | 73 | Scott Kingsley | So |
| DL | 75 | Daniel Cage | Fr |
| DL | 89 | Jacob Matuska | So |
| DL | 90 | Isaac Rochell | So |
| DL | 91 | Sheldon Day | Jr |
| DL | 92 | Grant Blankenship | Fr |
| DL | 93 | Jay Hayes | Fr |
| DL | 94 | Jarron Jones | Jr |
| DL | 95 | Marquis Dickerson | So |
| DL | 96 | Peter Mokwuah | Fr |
| DL | 97 | Patrick Mazza | So |
| DL | 98 | Andrew Trumbetti | Fr |

Special teams

| Pos. | # | Name | Class |
|---|---|---|---|
| K | 27 | Kyle Brindza | Sr |
| K | 43 | John Chereson | So |
| LS | 61 | Scott Daly | Jr |
| P | 85 | Tyler Newsome | Fr |
| LS | 99 | Hunter Smith | Jr |

Head coach

- Brian Kelly

Coordinators/assistant coaches

- Mike Denbrock – Offensive Coordinator/Wide Receivers
- Paul Longo – Director of Football Strength and Conditioning
- Brian VanGorder – Defensive Coordinator/Inside Linebackers
- Tony Alford – Recruiting Coordinator/Running Backs
- Scott Booker – Tight Ends/Special Teams Coordinator
- Kerry Cooks – Defensive Backs
- Bob Elliott – Outside Linebackers
- Mike Elston – Defensive Line
- Harry Hiestand – Offensive Line
- Matt LaFleur – Quarterbacks
- Dave Andrews – Assistant Director of Strength and Conditioning
- Jake Flint – Assistant Director of Strength and Conditioning
- David Grimes – Assistant Strength and Conditioning Coach
- Mike Hiestand – Graduate Assistant (Defense)
- Ryan Mahaffey – Graduate Assistant (Offense)
- Kyle McCarthy – Graduate Assistant (Defense)
- Tyler McDermott – Graduate Assistant (Offense)
- Tim Collins – Video Coordinator
- Julie DeBuysser – Senior Staff Assistant-Assistant Coaches
- Ryan Grooms – Head Football Equipment Manager
- Rob Hunt – Head Football Athletic Trainer
- Chad Klunder – Associate Athletic Director for Football Operations
- Kayla Matrunick – Sports Nutrition Program Director
- Joy McCausland – Senior Staff Assistant
- Jason Michelson – Coordinator of Football Operations
- David Peloquin – Director of Player Personnel
- Duke Preston – Director of Player Development
- Beth Rex – Director of Football Administration
- Megan Whitt – Coordinator of Recruiting Operations

Legend

- (C) Team captain
- (S) Suspended
- (I) Ineligible
- Injured
- Redshirt

Roster

=== Recruiting class ===
Brian Kelly received 23 commitments in his fourth full recruiting class including two five-stars: linebacker Nyles Morgan and offensive tackle Quenton Nelson. The class included student-athletes from 14 states.

College recruiting (2014)
| Name | Hometown | School | Height | Weight | 40^{‡} | Commit date |
|---|---|---|---|---|---|---|
| Alex Bars; OT | Nashville, TN | Montgomery Bell Academy | 6 ft 6 in (1.98 m) | 290 lb (130 kg) | – | May 7, 2013 |
| Alex Bars; OT | Recruit ratings: Scout: Rivals: (84) | | | | | |
| Grant Blankenship; DE | The Colony, TX | The Colony HS | 6 ft 6 in (1.98 m) | 252 lb (114 kg) | 4.75 | Jul 5, 2013 |
| Grant Blankenship; DE | Recruit ratings: Scout: Rivals: (79) | | | | | |
| Jonathan Bonner; DE | Chesterfield, MO | Parkway Central HS | 6 ft 4 in (1.93 m) | 250 lb (110 kg) | 4.8 | Jun 26, 2013 |
| Jonathan Bonner; DE | Recruit ratings: Scout: Rivals: (79) | | | | | |
| Justin Brent; WR | Speedway, IN | Speedway HS | 6 ft 1 in (1.85 m) | 197 lb (89 kg) | 4.52 | Jul 9, 2012 |
| Justin Brent; WR | Recruit ratings: Scout: Rivals: (82) | | | | | |
| Jimmy Byrne; OG | Parma Heights, OH | St. Ignatius HS | 6 ft 4 in (1.93 m) | 295 lb (134 kg) | 5.1 | Dec 8, 2012 |
| Jimmy Byrne; OG | Recruit ratings: Scout: Rivals: (78) | | | | | |
| Daniel Cage; DT | Cincinnati, OH | Winton Woods HS | 6 ft 3 in (1.91 m) | 295 lb (134 kg) | 4.9 | Feb 5, 2014 |
| Daniel Cage; DT | Recruit ratings: Scout: Rivals: (80) | | | | | |
| Jay Hayes; DT | Brooklyn, NY | Poly Prep HS | 6 ft 5 in (1.96 m) | 270 lb (120 kg) | 4.8 | Nov 7, 2012 |
| Jay Hayes; DT | Recruit ratings: Scout: Rivals: (80) | | | | | |
| Kolin Hill; DE/OLB | Schertz, TX | Samuel Clemens HS | 6 ft 2 in (1.88 m) | 225 lb (102 kg) | 4.56 | Dec 15, 2013 |
| Kolin Hill; DE/OLB | Recruit ratings: Scout: Rivals: (77) | | | | | |
| Corey Holmes; WR | Pembroke Pines, FL | St. Thomas Aquinas HS | 6 ft 2 in (1.88 m) | 175 lb (79 kg) | 4.48 | Jul 17, 2013 |
| Corey Holmes; WR | Recruit ratings: Scout: Rivals: (83) | | | | | |
| DeShone Kizer; QB | Toledo, OH | Central Catholic HS | 6 ft 5 in (1.96 m) | 215 lb (98 kg) | 4.81 | Jun 11, 2013 |
| DeShone Kizer; QB | Recruit ratings: Scout: Rivals: (80) | | | | | |
| Tyler Lautua; TE | Paramount, CA | La Mirada HS | 6 ft 4 in (1.93 m) | 240 lb (110 kg) | 4.9 | Dec 16, 2013 |
| Tyler Lautua; TE | Recruit ratings: Scout: Rivals: (83) | | | | | |
| Greer Martini; LB | Raleigh, NC | Woodberry Forest School | 6 ft 3 in (1.91 m) | 230 lb (100 kg) | 4.7 | Jul 3, 2012 |
| Greer Martini; LB | Recruit ratings: Scout: Rivals: (82) | | | | | |
| Pete Mokwuah; DT | Staten Island, NY | St. Joseph HS | 6 ft 4 in (1.93 m) | 315 lb (143 kg) | –- | Jan 24, 2014 |
| Pete Mokwuah; DT | Recruit ratings: Scout: Rivals: (77) | | | | | |
| Nyles Morgan; LB | Crete, IL | Crete-Monee HS | 6 ft 3 in (1.91 m) | 225 lb (102 kg) | 4.8 | Jan 4, 2014 |
| Nyles Morgan; LB | Recruit ratings: Scout: Rivals: (84) | | | | | |
| Sam Mustipher; OG | Owings Mills, MD | Good Counsel HS | 6 ft 3 in (1.91 m) | 295 lb (134 kg) | 5.1 | Apr 15, 2013 |
| Sam Mustipher; OG | Recruit ratings: Scout: Rivals: (81) | | | | | |
| Quenton Nelson; OT | Holmdel, NJ | Red Bank HS | 6 ft 5 in (1.96 m) | 300 lb (140 kg) | 5.2 | May 1, 2013 |
| Quenton Nelson; OT | Recruit ratings: Scout: Rivals: (83) | | | | | |
| Tyler Newsome; K/P | Carrollton, GA | Carrollton HS | 6 ft 2 in (1.88 m) | 175 lb (79 kg) | 5.0 | Jun 21, 2013 |
| Tyler Newsome; K/P | Recruit ratings: Scout: Rivals: (77) | | | | | |
| Nile Sykes; LB | Oak Park, IL | Montini Catholic HS | 6 ft 2 in (1.88 m) | 220 lb (100 kg) | 4.6 | Dec 15, 2013 |
| Nile Sykes; LB | Recruit ratings: Scout: Rivals: (80) | | | | | |
| Drue Tranquill; ATH | Huntertown, IN | Carroll HS | 6 ft 3 in (1.91 m) | 220 lb (100 kg) | 4.49 | Nov 19, 2013 |
| Drue Tranquill; ATH | Recruit ratings: Scout: Rivals: (78) | | | | | |
| Andrew Trumbetti; DE | Demarest, NJ | Northern Valley Regional HS | 6 ft 5 in (1.96 m) | 250 lb (110 kg) | 4.69 | Mar 23, 2013 |
| Andrew Trumbetti; DE | Recruit ratings: Scout: Rivals: (83) | | | | | |
| Nick Watkins; CB | Desoto, TX | Bishop Dunne HS | 6 ft 1 in (1.85 m) | 185 lb (84 kg) | 4.47 | Nov 1, 2013 |
| Nick Watkins; CB | Recruit ratings: Scout: Rivals: (83) | | | | | |
| Nic Weishar; TE | Midlothian, IL | Marist HS | 6 ft 5 in (1.96 m) | 235 lb (107 kg) | – | Apr 23, 2013 |
| Nic Weishar; TE | Recruit ratings: Scout: Rivals: (82) | | | | | |
| Jhonathon Williams; DE | Benton Harbor, MI | Berrien Springs HS | 6 ft 5 in (1.96 m) | 235 lb (107 kg) | 4.5 | Nov 27, 2013 |
| Jhonathon Williams; DE | Recruit ratings: Scout: Rivals: (77) | | | | | |
Overall recruit ranking: Scout: 6 Rivals: 11 ESPN: 11
‡ Refers to 40-yard dash; Note: In many cases, Scout, Rivals, 247Sports, On3, and ESPN may conflict in their listings of height, weight and 40 time.; In these cases, the average was taken. ESPN grades are on a 100-point scale.; Sources: "2014 Notre Dame Football Commitment List". Rivals.; "Scout.com Football Recruiting: Notre Dame". Scout.; "2014 Player Commitments – Notre Dame". ESPN.; "Scout.com Team Recruiting Rankings". Scout.; "2014 Team Ranking". Rivals.com.

== Statistics ==
Passing

1. Everett Golson - 256 of 427 (60.0%) for 3,445 yards, 29 touchdowns, 14 interceptions and a 143.6 passer rating.
2. Malik Zaire - 21 of 35 (60.0%) for 266 yards, 1 touchdown, 0 interceptions, 133.3 passer rating

Rushing

1. Tarean Folston - 889 yards on 175 carries, 5.1-yard average, 6 touchdowns
2. Greg Bryant, 289 yards on 54 carries, 5.4-yard average, 3 touchdowns
3. Everett Golson - 289 yards, 2.4-yard average, 8 touchdowns
4. Cam McDaniel - 278 yards on 77 carries, 3.6-yard average, 4 touchdowns
5. Malik Zaire - 187 yards on 33 carries, 5.7-yard average, 2 touchdowns
6. C.J. Prosise - 126 yards on 10 carries, 12.6-yard average, 1 touchdown

Receiving

1. William Fuller - 76 receptions for 1,094 yards, 14.4 yards per catch, 15 touchdowns
2. Chris Brown - 39 receptions for 548 yards, 14.1 yards per catch, 1 touchdown
3. Corey Robinson - 40 receptions for 539 yards, 13.5 yards per catch, 5 touchdowns
4. C.J. Prosise - 29 receptions for 516 yards, 17.8 yards per catch, 2 touchdowns
5. Ben Koyack - 30 receptions for 317 yards, 10.6 yards per catch, 2 touchdowns
6. Amir Carlisle - 23 receptions for 309 yards, 13.4 yards per catch, 3 touchdowns
7. Tarean Folston - 18 receptions for 190 yards, 10.6 yards per catch, 1 touchdown

Scoring

1. Kyle Brindza (K) - 93 points, 51 of 52 PAT, 14 of 24 field goals
2. William Fuller (WR) - 90 points, 15 touchdowns
3. Everett Golson (QB) - 50 points, 8 touchdowns, 1 two-point conversion
4. Tarean Folston (RB) - 42 points, 7 touchdowns
5. Corey Robinson (WR) - 30 points, 5 touchdowns
6. Cam McDaniel - 24 points, 4 touchdowns

== Awards and honors ==
No Notre Dame players received first-team honors on the 2014 All-America college football team. Linebacker Jaylon Smith received second-team All-America honors from the Associated Press.

Middle linebacker Joe Schmidt, a former walk-on player, was selected as the team's most valuable player.
