= 2014 NCAA Division I FBS football rankings =

- Season: 2014
- Bowl season: 2014–15 bowl games
- Preseason No. 1: Florida State
- End of season champions: Ohio State
- Conference with most teams in final AP poll: SEC, Pac-12 (6)

Two human polls and a committee's selections comprised the 2014 National Collegiate Athletic Association (NCAA) Division I Football Bowl Subdivision (FBS) football rankings, in addition to various publications' preseason polls. Unlike most sports, college football's governing body, the NCAA, does not bestow a national championship. Various unofficial titles are bestowed by different polling agencies. Two primary weekly polls began before the season—the AP Poll and the Coaches Poll. Midway through the season, the College Football Playoff (CFP) rankings were released after the eighth week.

2014 was the first season with the new College Football Playoff system which replaced the previous Bowl Championship Series. At the conclusion of the regular season, on December 7, the final CFP rankings determined who would play in the two bowl games designated as semifinals for the first College Football Playoff National Championship on January 12, 2015, at AT&T Stadium in Arlington, Texas.

== Legend ==
	Increase in ranking
	Decrease in ranking
	Not ranked previous week
	Selected for College Football Playoff
(#–#)	Win–loss record
(Italics)	Number of first place votes
т	Tied with team above or below also with this symbol

== AP Poll ==
	Preseason Aug 17	Week 1 Sep 2	Week 2 Sep 7	Week 3 Sep 14	Week 4 Sep 21	Week 5 Sep 28	Week 6 Oct 5	Week 7 Oct 12	Week 8 Oct 19	Week 9 Oct 26	Week 10 Nov 2	Week 11 Nov 9	Week 12 Nov 16	Week 13 Nov 23	Week 14 Nov 30	Week 15 Dec 7	Week 16 (Final) Jan 13	
1.	Florida State (57)	Florida State (1–0) (46)	Florida State (2–0) (38)	Florida State (2–0) (37)	Florida State (3–0) (34)	Florida State (4–0) (27)	Florida State (5–0) (35)	Mississippi State (6–0) (45)	Mississippi State (6–0) (43)	Mississippi State (7–0) (46)	Mississippi State (8–0) (45)	Mississippi State (9–0) (48)	Florida State (10–0) (43)	Florida State (11–0) (37)	Alabama (11–1) (25)	Alabama (12–1) (27)	Ohio State (14–1) (59)	1.
2.	Alabama (1)	Alabama (1–0) (1)	Oregon (2–0) (16)	Oregon (3–0) (17)	Oregon (4–0) (12)	Oregon (4–0) (13)	Auburn (5–0) (23)	Florida State (6–0) (12)	Florida State (7–0) (14)	Florida State (7–0) (14)	Florida State (8–0) (15)	Florida State (9–0) (12)	Alabama (9–1) (16)	Alabama (10–1) (21)	Florida State (12–0) (29)	Florida State (13–0) (25)	Oregon (13–2)	2.
3.	Oregon (1)	Oregon (1–0) (5)	Alabama (2–0) (1)	Alabama (3–0) (1)	Alabama (4–0) (6)	Alabama (4–0) (13)	Mississippi State (5–0) (2) т	Ole Miss (6–0) (3)	Ole Miss (7–0) (3)	Alabama (7–1)	Auburn (7–1)	Oregon (9–1)	Oregon (9–1) (1)	Oregon (10–1) (2)	Oregon (11–1) (5)	Oregon (12–1) (8)	TCU (12–1)	3.
4.	Oklahoma (1)	Oklahoma (1–0) (2)	Oklahoma (2–0) (2)	Oklahoma (3–0) (2)	Oklahoma (4–0) (4)	Oklahoma (4–0) (7)	Ole Miss (5–0) т	Baylor (6–0)	Alabama (6–1)	Auburn (6–1)	Alabama (7–1)	Alabama (8–1)	Mississippi State (9–1)	Mississippi State (10–1)	TCU (10–1)	Baylor (11–1)	Alabama (12–2)	4.
5.	Ohio State	Auburn (1–0)	Auburn (2–0)	Auburn (2–0)	Auburn (3–0)	Auburn (4–0)	Baylor (5–0)	Notre Dame (6–0)	Auburn (5–1)	Oregon (7–1)	Oregon (8–1)	TCU (8–1)	TCU (9–1)	Baylor (9–1)	Baylor (10–1)	Ohio State (12–1)	Florida State (13–1) т	5.
6.	Auburn	Georgia (1–0) (2)	Georgia (1–0) (1)	Texas A&M (3–0) (3)	Texas A&M (4–0) (4)	Texas A&M (5–0)	Notre Dame (5–0)	Auburn (5–1)	Oregon (6–1)	Notre Dame (6–1)	TCU (7–1)	Baylor (8–1)	Baylor (8–1)	TCU (9–1)	Ohio State (11–1)	TCU (11–1)	Michigan State (11–2) т	6.
7.	UCLA	Michigan State (1–0)	Texas A&M (2–0) (2)	Baylor (3–0)	Baylor (3–0)	Baylor (4–0)	Alabama (4–1)	Alabama (5–1)	Notre Dame (6–1)	Ole Miss (7–1)	Michigan State (7–1)	Arizona State (8–1)	Ohio State (9–1)	Ohio State (10–1)	Michigan State (10–2)	Michigan State (10–2)	Baylor (11–2)	7.
8.	Michigan State	Ohio State (1–0)	Baylor (2–0)	LSU (3–0)	Notre Dame (3–0)	UCLA (4–0)	Michigan State (4–1)	Michigan State (5–1)	Michigan State (6–1)	Michigan State (7–1)	Notre Dame (7–1)	Ohio State (8–1)	Ole Miss (8–2)	Georgia (9–2)	Arizona (10–2)	Mississippi State (10–2)	Georgia Tech (11–3)	8.
9.	South Carolina	Texas A&M (1–0) (2)	USC (2–0)	Notre Dame (3–0)	Michigan State (2–1)	Notre Dame (4–0)	TCU (4–0)	Oregon (5–1)	Georgia (6–1)	Georgia (6–1)	Kansas State (7–1)	Auburn (7–2)	Georgia (8–2)	UCLA (9–2)	Kansas State (9–2)	Ole Miss (9–3)	Georgia (10–3)	9.
10.	Baylor	Baylor (1–0)	LSU (2–0)	Ole Miss (3–0)	Ole Miss (3–0)	Michigan State (3–1)	Arizona (5–0)	Georgia (5–1)	TCU (5–1)	TCU (6–1)	Baylor (7–1)	Ole Miss (8–2)	Michigan State (8–2)	Michigan State (9–2)	Mississippi State (10–2)	Georgia Tech (10–3)	UCLA (10–3)	10.
11.	Stanford	UCLA (1–0)	Notre Dame (2–0)	Michigan State (1–1)	UCLA (3–0)	Ole Miss (4–0)	Oklahoma (4–1)	Oklahoma (5–1)	Kansas State (5–1)	Kansas State (6–1)	Arizona State (7–1)	Nebraska (8–1)	UCLA (8–2)	Kansas State (8–2)	Wisconsin (10–2)	Kansas State (9–3)	Mississippi State (10–3)	11.
12.	Georgia	LSU (1–0) (1)	UCLA (2–0)	UCLA (3–0)	Georgia (2–1)	Mississippi State (4–0)	Oregon (4–1)	TCU (4–1)	Baylor (6–1)	Baylor (6–1)	Ole Miss (7–2)	Michigan State (7–2)	Kansas State (7–2)	Arizona (9–2)	Georgia Tech (10–2)	Arizona (10–3)	Arizona State (10–3)	12.
13.	LSU	Stanford (1–0)	Michigan State (1–1)	Georgia (1–1)	South Carolina (3–1)	Georgia (3–1)	Georgia (4–1)	Ohio State (4–1)	Ohio State (5–1)	Ohio State (6–1)	Ohio State (7–1)	Kansas State (7–2)	Arizona State (8–2)	Arizona State (9–2)	Ole Miss (9–3)	Georgia (9–3)	Wisconsin (11–3)	13.
14.	Wisconsin	USC (1–0)	Ole Miss (2–0)	South Carolina (2–1)	Mississippi State (4–0)	Stanford (3–1)	Texas A&M (5–1)	Kansas State (4–1)	Arizona State (5–1)	Arizona (6–1)	LSU (7–2)	UCLA (8–2)	Wisconsin (8–2)	Wisconsin (9–2)	Missouri (10–2)	UCLA (9–3)	Missouri (11–3)	14.
15.	USC	Ole Miss (1–0)	Stanford (1–1)	Arizona State (3–0)	Arizona State (3–0)	LSU (4–1)	Ohio State (4–1)	Oklahoma State (5–1)	Arizona (5–1)	Arizona State (6–1)	Nebraska (8–1)	Notre Dame (7–2)	Arizona (8–2)	Auburn (8–3)	Georgia (9–3)	Arizona State (9–3)	Clemson (10–3)	15.
16.	Clemson	Notre Dame (1–0)	Arizona State (2–0)	Stanford (2–1)	Stanford (2–1)	USC (3–1)	Oklahoma State (4–1)	Arizona (5–1)	Nebraska (6–1)	LSU (7–2)	Oklahoma (6–2)	Georgia (7–2)	Auburn (7–3)	Georgia Tech (9–2)	UCLA (9–3)	Missouri (10–3)	Boise State (12–2)	16.
17.	Notre Dame	Arizona State (1–0)	Virginia Tech (2–0)	USC (2–1)	LSU (3–1)	Wisconsin (3–1)	Kansas State (4–1)	Arizona State (4–1)	Oklahoma (5–2)	Nebraska (7–1)	Georgia (6–2)	Arizona (7–2)	Georgia Tech (9–2)	Missouri (9–2)	Arizona State (9–3)	Wisconsin (10–3)	Ole Miss (9–4)	17.
18.	Ole Miss	Wisconsin (0–1)	Wisconsin (1–1)	Missouri (3–0)	USC (2–1)	BYU (4–0)	UCLA (4–1)	East Carolina (5–1)	East Carolina (5–1)	Utah (6–1)	UCLA (7–2)	Clemson (7–2)	Marshall (10–0)	Ole Miss (8–3)	Oklahoma (8–3)	Clemson (9–3)	Kansas State (9–4)	18.
19.	Arizona State	Nebraska (1–0)	Kansas State (2–0)	Wisconsin (1–1)	Wisconsin (2–1)	Nebraska (5–0)	East Carolina (4–1)	Nebraska (5–1)	Utah (5–1)	Oklahoma (5–2)	Clemson (6–2)	Duke (8–1)	Missouri (8–2)	Marshall (11–0)	Clemson (9–3)	Auburn (8–4)	Arizona (10–4)	19.
20.	Kansas State	Kansas State (1–0)	Missouri (2–0)	Kansas State (2–0)	BYU (4–0)	Ohio State (3–1)	Arizona State (4–1)	Utah (4–1)	USC (5–2)	West Virginia (6–2)	Utah (6–2)	LSU (7–3)	Utah (7–3)	Oklahoma (8–3)	Auburn (8–4)	Louisville (9–3)	USC (9–4)	20.
21.	Texas A&M	North Carolina (1–0) т	Louisville (2–0)	BYU (3–0)	Nebraska (4–0)	Oklahoma State (3–1)	Nebraska (5–1)	Texas A&M (5–2)	Clemson (5–2)	East Carolina (6–1)	Arizona (6–2)	Marshall (9–0)	Nebraska (8–2)	Colorado State (10–1)	Louisville (9–3)	Boise State (11–2)	Utah (9–4)	21.
22.	Nebraska	South Carolina (0–1) т	Ohio State (1–1)	Clemson (1–1)	Ohio State (2–1)	East Carolina (3–1)	Georgia Tech (5–0)	USC (4–2)	West Virginia (5–2)	Clemson (6–2)	Duke (7–1)	Wisconsin (7–2)	Colorado State (9–1)	Minnesota (8–3)	Boise State (10–2)	LSU (8–4)	Auburn (8–5)	22.
23.	North Carolina	Clemson (0–1)	Clemson (1–1)	Ohio State (2–1)	East Carolina (3–1)	Kansas State (3–1)	Missouri (4–1)	Stanford (4–2)	Marshall (7–0)	Marshall (8–0)	Marshall (8–0)	Colorado State (9–1)	Oklahoma (7–3)	Clemson (8–3)	LSU (8–4)	Utah (8–4)	Marshall (13–1)	23.
24.	Missouri	Missouri (1–0)	South Carolina (1–1)	Nebraska (3–0)	Oklahoma State (2–1)	Missouri (4–1)	Utah (4–1)	Clemson (4–2)	LSU (6–2)	Duke (6–1)	West Virginia (6–3)	Georgia Tech (8–2)	USC (7–3)	Louisville (8–3)	Utah (8–4)	USC (8–4)	Louisville (9–4)	24.
25.	Washington	Louisville (1–0)	BYU (2–0)	Oklahoma State (2–1)	Kansas State (2–1)	TCU (3–0)	Stanford (3–2)	Marshall (6–0)	UCLA (5–2)	UCLA (6–2)	Wisconsin (6–2)	Utah (6–3)	Duke (8–2)	Boise State (9–2)	Nebraska (9–3)	Nebraska (9–3)	Memphis (10–3)	25.
	Preseason Aug 17	Week 1 Sep 2	Week 2 Sep 7	Week 3 Sep 14	Week 4 Sep 21	Week 5 Sep 28	Week 6 Oct 5	Week 7 Oct 12	Week 8 Oct 19	Week 9 Oct 26	Week 10 Nov 2	Week 11 Nov 9	Week 12 Nov 16	Week 13 Nov 23	Week 14 Nov 30	Week 15 Dec 7	Week 16 (Final) Jan 13	
		Dropped: Washington	Dropped: Nebraska; North Carolina	Dropped: Virginia Tech; Louisville	Dropped: Missouri; Clemson	Dropped: South Carolina; Arizona State	Dropped: LSU; USC; Wisconsin; BYU	Dropped: UCLA; Georgia Tech; Missouri	Dropped: Oklahoma State; Texas A&M; Stanford	Dropped: USC	Dropped: East Carolina	Dropped: Oklahoma; West Virginia	Dropped: Notre Dame; Clemson; LSU	Dropped: Utah; Nebraska; USC; Duke	Dropped: Marshall; Colorado State; Minnesota	Dropped: Oklahoma	Dropped: LSU; Nebraska	

== Coaches Poll ==
	Preseason Jul 31	Week 1 Sep 2	Week 2 Sep 7	Week 3 Sep 14	Week 4 Sep 21	Week 5 Sep 28	Week 6 Oct 5	Week 7 Oct 12	Week 8 Oct 19	Week 9 Oct 26	Week 10 Nov 2	Week 11 Nov 9	Week 12 Nov 16	Week 13 Nov 23	Week 14 Nov 30	Week 15 Dec 7	Week 16 (Final) Jan 13	
1.	Florida State (56)	Florida State (1–0) (57)	Florida State (2–0) (51)	Florida State (2–0) (50)	Florida State (3–0) (36)	Alabama (4–0) (15)	Florida State (5–0) (44)	Mississippi State (6–0) (26)	Mississippi State (6–0) (36)	Mississippi State (7–0) (41)	Mississippi State (8–0) (40)	Mississippi State (9–0) (41)	Florida State (10–0) (39)	Alabama (10–1) (25)	Alabama (11–1) (28)	Alabama (12–1) (28)	Ohio State (14–1) (64)	1.
2.	Alabama	Alabama (1–0)	Alabama (2–0) (1)	Alabama (3–0) (1)	Alabama (4–0) (11)	Florida State (4–0) (26)	Auburn (5–0) (16)	Florida State (6–0) (31)	Florida State (7–0) (22)	Florida State (7–0) (21)	Florida State (8–0) (22)	Florida State (9–0) (20)	Alabama (9–1) (17)	Florida State (11–0) (30)	Florida State (12–0) (28)	Florida State (13–0) (25)	Oregon (13–2)	2.
3.	Oklahoma (3)	Oklahoma (1–0) (2)	Oklahoma (2–0) (3)	Oregon (3–0) (6)	Oklahoma (4–0) (12)	Oklahoma (4–0) (14)	Baylor (5–0) (1)	Ole Miss (6–0) (5)	Ole Miss (7–0) (4)	Alabama (7–1)	Auburn (7–1)	Alabama (8–1)	Oregon (9–1) (6)	Oregon (10–1) (6)	Oregon (11–1) (6)	Oregon (12–1) (7)	TCU (12–1)	3.
4.	Oregon (1)	Oregon (1–0) (2)	Oregon (2–0) (6)	Oklahoma (3–0) (4)	Oregon (4–0) (3)	Oregon (4–0) (7)	Ole Miss (5–0)	Baylor (6–0)	Alabama (6–1)	Auburn (6–1)	Alabama (7–1)	Oregon (9–1) (1)	Mississippi State (9–1)	Mississippi State (10–1)	TCU (10–1)	Ohio State (12–1)	Alabama (12–2)	4.
5.	Auburn	Auburn (1–0)	Auburn (2–0)	Auburn (2–0)	Auburn (3–0)	Auburn (4–0)	Notre Dame (5–0)	Notre Dame (6–0)	Michigan State (6–1)	Michigan State (7–1)	Oregon (8–1)	TCU (8–1)	TCU (9–1)	TCU (9–1)	Baylor (10–1)	Baylor (11–1)	Michigan State (11–2)	5.
6.	Ohio State (1)	Michigan State (1–0)	Georgia (1–0) (1)	Baylor (2–0)	Baylor (3–0)	Baylor (4–0)	Mississippi State (5–0)	Michigan State (5–1)	Auburn (5–1)	Oregon (7–1)	Michigan State (7–1)	Baylor (8–1)	Baylor (8–1)	Baylor (9–1)	Ohio State (11–1)	TCU (11–1) (1)	Florida State (13–1)	6.
7.	UCLA	Ohio State (1–0)	Baylor (2–0)	Texas A&M (3–0)	Texas A&M (4–0)	Texas A&M (5–0)	Alabama (4–1)	Alabama (5–1)	Oregon (6–1)	Notre Dame (6–1)	TCU (7–1)	Ohio State (8–1)	Ohio State (9–1)	Ohio State (10–1)	Michigan State (10–2)	Michigan State (10–2)	Georgia Tech (11–3)	7.
8.	Michigan State	Georgia (1–0) (1)	Texas A&M (2–0)	LSU (3–0)	Notre Dame (3–0)	Notre Dame (4–0)	Michigan State (4–1)	Auburn (5–1)	Notre Dame (6–1)	Georgia (6–1)	Notre Dame (7–1)	Arizona State (8–1)	Ole Miss (8–2)	Michigan State (9–2)	Arizona (10–2)	Mississippi State (10–2)	Baylor (11–2)	8.
9.	South Carolina (1)	Baylor (1–0)	LSU (2–0)	Notre Dame (3–0)	Michigan State (2–1)	UCLA (4–0)	Oklahoma (4–1)	Oregon (5–1)	Georgia (6–1)	Ole Miss (7–1)	Kansas State (7–1)	Auburn (7–2)	Michigan State (8–2)	Georgia (9–2)	Kansas State (9–2)	Georgia Tech (10–3)	Georgia (10–3)	9.
10.	Baylor	Stanford (1–0)	USC (2–0)	UCLA (3–0)	UCLA (3–0)	Michigan State (3–1)	Georgia (4–1)	Georgia (5–1)	TCU (5–1)	TCU (6–1)	Baylor (7–1)	Ole Miss (8–2)	Georgia (8–2)	UCLA (9–2)	Mississippi State (10–2)	Kansas State (9–3)	UCLA (10–3)	10.
11.	Stanford	UCLA (1–0)	Notre Dame (2–0)	Michigan State (1–1)	Ole Miss (3–0)	Ole Miss (4–0)	Oregon (4–1)	Oklahoma (5–1)	Kansas State (5–1)	Kansas State (6–1)	Ohio State (7–1)	Nebraska (8–1)	Kansas State (7–2)	Kansas State (8–2)	Wisconsin (10–2)	Arizona (10–3)	Missouri (11–3)	11.
12.	Georgia	LSU (1–0)	UCLA (2–0)	Ole Miss (3–0)	Arizona State (3–0)	Georgia (3–1)	TCU (4–0)	TCU (4–1)	Ohio State (5–1)	Baylor (6–1)	Arizona State (7–1)	Michigan State (7–2)	UCLA (8–2)	Arizona (9–2)	Georgia Tech (10–2)	Ole Miss (9–3)	Mississippi State (10–3)	12.
13.	LSU	Texas A&M (1–0)	Michigan State (1–1)	Arizona State (3–0)	Georgia (2–1)	Stanford (3–1)	Arizona (5–0)	Ohio State (4–1)	Baylor (6–1)	Ohio State (6–1)	Ole Miss (7–2)	Kansas State (7–2)	Arizona (8–2)	Arizona State (9–2)	Missouri (10–2)	Georgia (9–3)	Wisconsin (11–3)	13.
14.	Wisconsin	USC (1–0)	Arizona State (2–0)	Georgia (1–1)	Stanford (2–1)	Mississippi State (4–0)	Texas A&M (5–1)	Kansas State (4–1)	Arizona State (5–1)	Arizona State (6–1)	Nebraska (8–1)	Georgia (7–2)	Arizona State (8–2)	Wisconsin (9–2)	Ole Miss (9–3)	Missouri (10–3)	Arizona State (10–3)	14.
15.	USC	Notre Dame (1–0)	Ole Miss (2–0)	Stanford (2–1)	South Carolina (3–1)	LSU (4–1)	Ohio State (4–1)	Oklahoma State (5–1)	Arizona (5–1)	Arizona (6–1)	LSU (7–2)	UCLA (8–2)	Wisconsin (8–2)	Georgia Tech (9–2)	Georgia (9–3)	UCLA (9–3)	Clemson (10–3)	15.
16.	Clemson	Arizona State (1–0)	Stanford (1–1)	South Carolina (2–1)	Mississippi State (4–0)	Wisconsin (3–1)	Kansas State (4–1)	East Carolina (5–1)	Nebraska (6–1)	Nebraska (7–1)	Oklahoma (6–2)	Notre Dame (7–2)	Georgia Tech (9–2)	Auburn (8–3)	Oklahoma (8–3)	Arizona State (9–3)	Boise State (12–2)	16.
17.	Notre Dame	Ole Miss (1–0)	Wisconsin (1–1)	Wisconsin (1–1)	Wisconsin (2–1)	Nebraska (5–0)	UCLA (4–1)	Arizona (5–1)	East Carolina (5–1)	LSU (7–2)	Georgia (6–2)	Clemson (7–2)	Auburn (7–3)	Missouri (9–2)	UCLA (9–3)	Wisconsin (10–3)	Arizona (10–4)	17.
18.	Arizona State	Nebraska (1–0)	Ohio State (1–1)	Ohio State (2–1)	LSU (3–1)	Ohio State (3–1)	Oklahoma State (4–1)	Arizona State (4–1)	Oklahoma (5–2)	Utah (6–1)	UCLA (7–2)	Arizona (7–2)	Marshall (10–0)	Oklahoma (8–3)	Arizona State (9–3)	Clemson (9–3)	Kansas State (9–4)	18.
19.	Ole Miss	Wisconsin (0–1)	Virginia Tech (2–0)	Missouri (3–0)	Nebraska (4–0)	BYU (4–0)	East Carolina (4–1)	Nebraska (5–1)	Utah (5–1)	East Carolina (6–1)	Clemson (6–2)	Duke (8–1)	Nebraska (8–2)	Ole Miss (8–3)	Clemson (9–3)	Auburn (8–4)	Ole Miss (9–4)	19.
20.	Texas A&M	Kansas State (1–0)	Kansas State (2–0)	Kansas State (2–0)	Ohio State (2–1)	USC (3–1)	Arizona State (4–1)	Stanford (4–2)	Clemson (5–2)	Oklahoma (5–2)	Duke (7–1)	LSU (7–3)	Missouri (8–2)	Marshall (11–0)	Louisville (9–3)	Louisville (9–3)	Utah (9–4)	20.
21.	Kansas State	South Carolina (0–1)	Nebraska (2–0)	USC (2–1)	BYU (4–0)	East Carolina (3–1)	Nebraska (5–1)	Texas A&M (5–2)	USC (5–2)	Clemson (6–2)	Arizona (6–2)	Marshall (9–0)	Utah (7–3)	Colorado State (10–1)	Auburn (8–4)	Boise State (11–2)	USC (9–4)	21.
22.	Nebraska	Missouri (1–0)	Missouri (2–0)	Nebraska (3–0)	USC (2–1)	Kansas State (3–1)	Stanford (3–2)	Clemson (4–2)	Marshall (7–0)	West Virginia (6–2)	Marshall (8–0) т	Wisconsin (7–2)	Oklahoma (7–3)	Minnesota (8–3)	Boise State (10–2)	Nebraska (9–3)	Marshall (13–1)	22.
23.	North Carolina	North Carolina (1–0)	South Carolina (1–1)	BYU (3–0)	Duke (4–0)	Oklahoma State (3–1)	Georgia Tech (5–0)	Utah (4–1)	LSU (6–2)	Marshall (8–0)	Utah (6–2) т	Georgia Tech (8–2)	Colorado State (9–1)	Louisville (8–3)	Nebraska (9–3)	LSU (8–4)	Auburn (8–5)	23.
24.	Texas	Clemson (0–1)	Clemson (1–1)	Clemson (1–1)	East Carolina (3–1)	Arizona State (3–1)	Missouri (4–1)	Marshall (6–0)	Minnesota (6–1)	Duke (6–1)	Wisconsin (6–2)	Oklahoma (6–3)	USC (7–3)	Clemson (8–3)	LSU (8–4)	Oklahoma (8–4)	Louisville (9–4)	24.
25.	Washington	Texas (1–0)	North Carolina (2–0)	North Carolina (2–0)	Kansas State (2–1)	TCU (3–0)	Clemson (3–2)	USC (4–2)	West Virginia (5–2)	UCLA (6–2)	West Virginia (6–3)	Colorado State (9–1)	Duke (8–2)	Boise State (9–2)	Minnesota (8–4)	Utah (8–4)	Memphis (10–3)	25.
	Preseason Jul 31	Week 1 Sep 2	Week 2 Sep 7	Week 3 Sep 14	Week 4 Sep 21	Week 5 Sep 28	Week 6 Oct 5	Week 7 Oct 12	Week 8 Oct 19	Week 9 Oct 26	Week 10 Nov 2	Week 11 Nov 9	Week 12 Nov 16	Week 13 Nov 23	Week 14 Nov 30	Week 15 Dec 7	Week 16 (Final) Jan 13	
		Dropped: Washington	Dropped: Texas	Dropped: Virginia Tech	Dropped: Missouri; Clemson; North Carolina	Dropped: South Carolina; Duke	Dropped: LSU; Wisconsin; BYU; USC	Dropped: UCLA; Georgia Tech; Missouri	Dropped: Oklahoma State; Stanford; Texas A&M	Dropped: USC; Minnesota	Dropped: East Carolina	Dropped: Utah; West Virginia	Dropped: Notre Dame; Clemson; LSU	Dropped: Nebraska; Utah; USC; Duke	Dropped: Marshall; Colorado State	Dropped: Minnesota	Dropped: Nebraska; LSU; Oklahoma	

== CFP rankings ==
	Week 9 Oct 28	Week 10 Nov 4	Week 11 Nov 11	Week 12 Nov 18	Week 13 Nov 25	Week 14 Dec 2	Week 15 (Final) Dec 7	
1.	Mississippi State (7–0)	Mississippi State (8–0)	Mississippi State (9–0)	Alabama (9–1)	Alabama (10–1)	Alabama (11–1)	Alabama (12–1)	1.
2.	Florida State (7–0)	Florida State (8–0)	Oregon (9–1)	Oregon (9–1)	Oregon (10–1)	Oregon (11–1)	Oregon (12–1)	2.
3.	Auburn (6–1)	Auburn (7–1)	Florida State (9–0)	Florida State (10–0)	Florida State (11–0)	TCU (10–1)	Florida State (13–0)	3.
4.	Ole Miss (7–1)	Oregon (8–1)	TCU (8–1)	Mississippi State (9–1)	Mississippi State (10–1)	Florida State (12–0)	Ohio State (12–1)	4.
5.	Oregon (7–1)	Alabama (7–1)	Alabama (8–1)	TCU (9–1)	TCU (9–1)	Ohio State (11–1)	Baylor (11–1)	5.
6.	Alabama (7–1)	TCU (7–1)	Arizona State (8–1)	Ohio State (9–1)	Ohio State (10–1)	Baylor (10–1)	TCU (11–1)	6.
7.	TCU (6–1)	Kansas State (7–1)	Baylor (8–1)	Baylor (8–1)	Baylor (9–1)	Arizona (10–2)	Mississippi State (10–2)	7.
8.	Michigan State (7–1)	Michigan State (7–1)	Ohio State (8–1)	Ole Miss (8–2)	UCLA (9–2)	Michigan State (10–2)	Michigan State (10–2)	8.
9.	Kansas State (6–1)	Arizona State (7–1)	Auburn (7–2)	UCLA (8–2)	Georgia (9–2)	Kansas State (9–2)	Ole Miss (9–3)	9.
10.	Notre Dame (6–1)	Notre Dame (7–1)	Ole Miss (8–2)	Georgia (8–2)	Michigan State (9–2)	Mississippi State (10–2)	Arizona (10–3)	10.
11.	Georgia (6–1)	Ole Miss (7–2)	UCLA (8–2)	Michigan State (8–2)	Arizona (9–2)	Georgia Tech (10–2)	Kansas State (9–3)	11.
12.	Arizona (6–1)	Baylor (7–1)	Michigan State (7–2)	Kansas State (7–2)	Kansas State (8–2)	Ole Miss (9–3)	Georgia Tech (10–3)	12.
13.	Baylor (6–1)	Nebraska (8–1)	Kansas State (7–2)	Arizona State (8–2)	Arizona State (9–2)	Wisconsin (10–2)	Georgia (9–3)	13.
14.	Arizona State (6–1)	Ohio State (7–1)	Arizona (7–2)	Auburn (7–3)	Wisconsin (9–2)	Georgia (9–3)	UCLA (9–3)	14.
15.	Nebraska (7–1)	Oklahoma (6–2)	Georgia (7–2)	Arizona (8–2)	Auburn (8–3)	UCLA (9–3)	Arizona State (9–3)	15.
16.	Ohio State (6–1)	LSU (7–2)	Nebraska (8–1)	Wisconsin (8–2)	Georgia Tech (9–2)	Missouri (10–2)	Missouri (10–3)	16.
17.	Utah (6–1)	Utah (6–2)	LSU (7–3)	Utah (7–3)	Missouri (9–2)	Arizona State (9–3)	Clemson (9–3)	17.
18.	Oklahoma (5–2)	UCLA (7–2)	Notre Dame (7–2)	Georgia Tech (9–2)	Minnesota (8–3)	Clemson (9–3)	Wisconsin (10–3)	18.
19.	LSU (7–2)	Arizona (6–2)	Clemson (7–2)	USC (7–3)	Ole Miss (8–3)	Auburn (8–4)	Auburn (8–4)	19.
20.	West Virginia (6–2)	Georgia (6–2)	Wisconsin (7–2)	Missouri (8–2)	Oklahoma (8–3)	Oklahoma (8–3)	Boise State (11–2)	20.
21.	Clemson (6–2)	Clemson (6–2)	Duke (8–1)	Oklahoma (7–3)	Clemson (8–3)	Louisville (9–3)	Louisville (9–3)	21.
22.	UCLA (6–2)	Duke (7–1)	Georgia Tech (8–2)	Clemson (7–3)	Louisville (8–3)	Boise State (10–2)	Utah (8–4)	22.
23.	East Carolina (6–1)	West Virginia (6–3)	Utah (6–3)	Nebraska (8–2)	Boise State (9–2)	Utah (8–4)	LSU (8–4)	23.
24.	Duke (6–1)	Georgia Tech (7–2)	Texas A&M (7–3)	Louisville (7–3)	Marshall (11–0)	LSU (8–4)	USC (8–4)	24.
25.	Louisville (6–2)	Wisconsin (6–2)	Minnesota (7–2)	Minnesota (7–3)	Utah (7–4)	USC (8–4)	Minnesota (8–4)	25.
	Week 9 Oct 28	Week 10 Nov 4	Week 11 Nov 11	Week 12 Nov 18	Week 13 Nov 25	Week 14 Dec 2	Week 15 (Final) Dec 7	
		Dropped: East Carolina; Louisville	Dropped: Oklahoma; West Virginia	Dropped: LSU; Notre Dame; Duke; Texas A&M	Dropped: USC; Nebraska	Dropped: Minnesota; Marshall	Dropped: Oklahoma	
