= Malik Zaire =

American football player and media personality (born 1995)

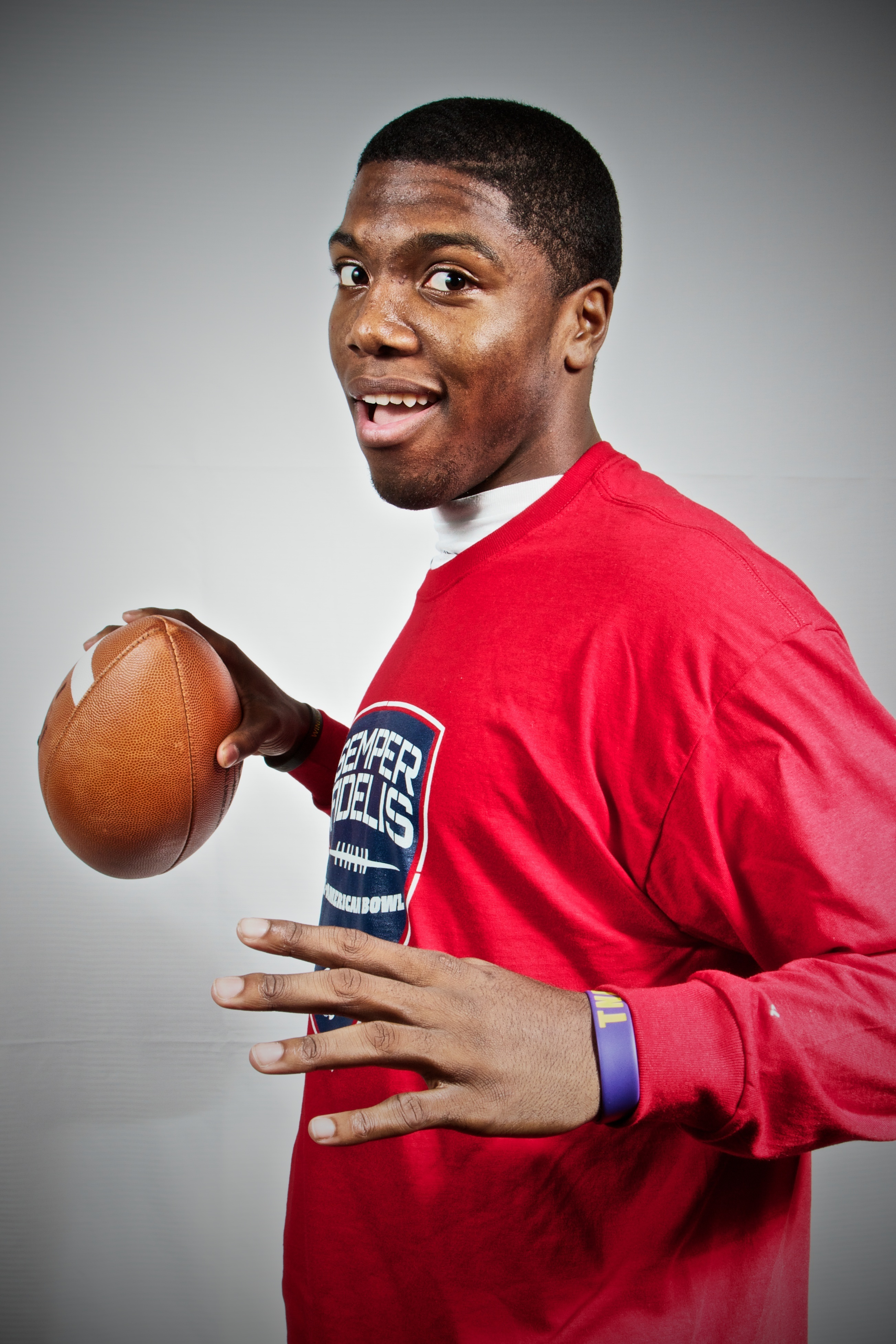
- Zaire in 2012

No. 8, 9
- Position: Quarterback

Personal information
- Born: February 28, 1995 (age 31); Kettering, Ohio, U.S.
- Listed height: 6 ft 0 in (1.83 m)
- Listed weight: 225 lb (102 kg)

Career information
- High school: Archbishop Alter (Kettering, Ohio)
- College: Notre Dame (2013–2016); Florida (2017)
- NFL draft: 2018: undrafted

Malik Jamaal Zaire (born February 28, 1995) is an American media personality and former collegiate football quarterback. He works for the sports media company Overtime as on-air talent and a producer, as well as a color commentator for college football games on the CBS Sports Network. He played college football at Notre Dame, before joining Florida as a graduate transfer.

== Early life ==
Zaire attended Archbishop Alter High School in Kettering, Ohio. As a senior, he earned 2012 AP Ohio Division III Southwest District Offensive Player of the Year accolades with 1,990 yards passing, 1,120 yards on the ground and 33 total touchdowns (24 passing touchdowns and nine rushing touchdowns).

He was rated by Rivals.com as a four-star recruit and was ranked as the third best dual-threat quarterback in his class. Zaire committed to the University of Notre Dame in Notre Dame, Indiana to play college football.

College recruiting
Name	Hometown	School	Height	Weight	Commit date
Malik Zaire; Dual-Threat QB	Kettering, OH	Archbishop Alter HS	6 ft 1 in (1.85 m)	196 lb (89 kg)	Mar 25, 2012
Malik Zaire; Dual-Threat QB	Recruit ratings: Scout: Rivals: (83)				
Overall recruit ranking: Scout: 14 (QB), 1 (OH), 3 (regional), 172 (national) Rivals: 3 (QB), 122 (national) ESPN: 6 (QB), 189 (national)
Note: In many cases, Scout, Rivals, 247Sports, On3, and ESPN may conflict in their listings of height and weight.; In these cases, the average was taken. ESPN grades are on a 100-point scale.; Sources: "Notre Dame Football Commitment List". Rivals.; "Notre Dame College Football Recruiting Commits". Scout.; "ESPN". ESPN.; "Scout.com Team Recruiting Rankings". Scout.; "2013 Team Ranking". Rivals.com.

== College career ==
=== Notre Dame ===
==== 2013 season ====
Zaire did not play in any games as a freshman at Notre Dame in 2013.

==== 2014 season ====
Prior to his sophomore season in 2014, Zaire competed with Everett Golson to be starting quarterback. Golson won the job with Zaire as the backup. He received his first extensive playing time against the USC Trojans, replacing Golson, who was benched. He completed 9 of 20 passes for 170 yards and a rushing touchdown in the game. After spending the entire season as Golson's backup, Zaire started the 2014 Music City Bowl, becoming the first left-handed quarterback to ever start for the Fighting Irish. Zaire completed 12 of 15 passes for 96 yards with one touchdown, and ran for 96 yards on 22 carries scoring one touchdown, leading Notre Dame to a 31–28 victory over LSU and earning the game's MVP.

==== 2015 season ====
The Fighting Irish opened spring practice with an open competition at quarterback, but neither Zaire or Everett Golson distinguished themselves as being a starter according to head coach Brian Kelly. However, after Golson decided to transfer and play his final season at Florida State University, Zaire was named the starting quarterback. In the second game of the season, against Virginia, Zaire fractured his ankle after a run. It was announced after the game that he would miss the rest of the season.

==== 2016 season ====
Zaire battled DeShone Kizer before the season for the starting quarterback position. Both shared snaps in the team's first game, a loss to Texas. Statistically Kizer had a far better game than Zaire, earning Kizer the starting quarterback position. Zaire played little during the remainder of the season. After graduating from Notre Dame in May 2017, he announced that he had transferred to the University of Florida to play a fifth year in the 2017 season.

=== Florida ===
==== 2017 season ====
Zaire started two games and appeared in four. He finished with an overall record of 0–2 as a starter, completing 57.1 percent of his passes for 349 yards with no touchdowns and one interception.

== Professional career ==
Pre-draft measurables
Height	Weight	Arm length	Hand span	40-yard dash	10-yard split	20-yard split	20-yard shuttle	Three-cone drill	Vertical jump	Broad jump
5 ft 11 7/8 in (1.83 m)	225 lb (102 kg)	32 5/8 in (0.83 m)	9 3/4 in (0.25 m)	4.93 s	1.65 s	2.88 s	4.40 s	7.20 s	28.5 in (0.72 m)	9 ft 0 in (2.74 m)
All values from Pro Day

After going undrafted in the 2018 NFL draft, Zaire was invited to attend the Jacksonville Jaguars' rookie minicamp on a tryout basis. He did not make the Jaguars roster.
