= 2015 Notre Dame Fighting Irish football team =

American college football season

2015 Notre Dame Fighting Irish football

Fiesta Bowl, L 28–44 vs. Ohio State
- Conference: Independent

Ranking
- Coaches: No. 12
- AP: No. 11
- Record: 10–3
- Head coach: Brian Kelly (6th season)
- Offensive coordinator: Mike Sanford Jr. (1st season)
- Offensive scheme: Spread
- Defensive coordinator: Brian VanGorder (2nd season)
- Base defense: 4–3 multiple
- MVP: Will Fuller
- Captains: Sheldon Day; Nick Martin; Joe Schmidt; Jaylon Smith; Matthias Farley
- Home stadium: Notre Dame Stadium

2015 NCAA Division I FBS independents football records
	Conf.			Overall
Team	W		L	W		L
No. 11 Notre Dame		–		10	–	3
BYU		–		9	–	4
Army		–		2	–	10
Rankings from AP Poll

The 2015 Notre Dame Fighting Irish football team was an American football team that represented the University of Notre Dame as an independent during the 2015 NCAA Division I FBS football season. In their sixth year under head coach Brian Kelly, the Irish compiled a 10–3 record, outscored opponents by a total of 445 to 313, and were ranked No. 11 in the final AP poll and No. 12 in the final Coaches Poll. They lost to No. 12 Clemson, No. 9 Stanford, and No. 7 Ohio State, the latter loss in the Fiesta Bowl.

The Irish had 14 plays of over 50 yards during the season, which was a school record. They also had two touchdowns of over 90 yards, a 91-yard touchdown run by C.J. Prosise and a 98-yard touchdown run by Josh Adams. The Irish only had two such plays in the previous 126 years. The team's statistical leaders were quarterback DeShone Kizer (2,884 passing yards), running back C.J. Prosise (1,032 rushing yards), wide receiver Will Fuller (62 receptions for 1,258 yards), and kicker Justin Yoon (95 points scored). Fuller was selected as the team's most valuable player. Offensive tackle Ronnie Stanley and linebacker Jaylon Smith were consensus first-team picks on the 2015 All-America college football team.

The team played its home games at Notre Dame Stadium in Notre Dame, Indiana.

== Schedule ==
Date	Time	Opponent	Rank	Site	TV	Result	Attendance
September 5	7:30 p.m.	Texas	No. 11	Notre Dame Stadium; Notre Dame, IN	NBC	W 38–3	80,795
September 12	3:30 p.m.	at Virginia	No. 9	Scott Stadium; Charlottesville, VA	ABC	W 34–27	58,200
September 19	3:30 p.m.	No. 14 Georgia Tech	No. 8	Notre Dame Stadium; Notre Dame, IN (rivalry)	NBC	W 30–22	80,795
September 26	3:30 p.m.	UMass	No. 6	Notre Dame Stadium; Notre Dame, IN	NBC	W 62–27	80,795
October 3	8:00 p.m.	at No. 12 Clemson	No. 6	Memorial Stadium; Clemson, SC (College GameDay)	ABC	L 22–24	82,415
October 10	3:30 p.m.	Navy	No. 15	Notre Dame Stadium; Notre Dame, IN (rivalry)	NBC	W 41–24	80,795
October 17	7:30 p.m.	USC	No. 14	Notre Dame Stadium; Notre Dame, IN (rivalry)	NBC	W 41–31	80,795
October 31	8:00 p.m.	at No. 21 Temple	No. 9	Lincoln Financial Field; Philadelphia, PA	ABC	W 24–20	69,280
November 7	12:00 p.m.	at Pittsburgh	No. 5	Heinz Field; Pittsburgh, PA (rivalry)	ABC	W 42–30	68,400
November 14	3:30 p.m.	Wake Forest	No. 4	Notre Dame Stadium; Notre Dame, IN	NBC	W 28–7	80,795
November 21	7:30 p.m.	vs. Boston College	No. 4	Fenway Park; Boston, MA (Shamrock Series, Holy War)	NBCSN	W 19–16	38,686
November 28	7:30 p.m.	at No. 9 Stanford	No. 6	Stanford Stadium; Stanford, CA (rivalry)	Fox	L 36–38	51,424
January 1, 2016	1:00 p.m.	vs. No. 7 Ohio State	No. 8	University of Phoenix Stadium; Glendale, AZ (Fiesta Bowl)	ESPN	L 28–44	71,123
Rankings from AP Poll and CFP Rankings after November 3 released prior to game; All times are in Eastern time

== Before the season ==
On May 19, 2015, quarterback Everett Golson announced he was transferring to Florida State to complete his college eligibility. During the off-season, Notre Dame lost three assistant coaches to other opportunities: Kerry Cooks left for University of Oklahoma. Matt LaFleur departed for the Atlanta Falcons, and Tony Alford left for Ohio State. Also, outside linebackers coach Bob Elliott moved into an off-the-field coaching role within the program. To replace their losses, Notre Dame added four new assistant coaches. Mike Sanford Jr. former offensive coordinator and quarterbacks coach at Boise State accepted the same position on the coaching staff. Todd Lyght, a former All-American at Notre Dame and cornerbacks coach at Vanderbilt, accepted the same position at Notre Dame. Keith Gilmore, previously the defensive line coach at North Carolina, accepted the same position on the coaching staff. Autry Denson, Notre Dame's all-time leading rusher and running backs coach at the University of South Florida, accepted the same position at Notre Dame.

== A Season with Notre Dame ==
The 2015 Notre Dame Fighting Irish football team was featured in the miniseries, A Season With Notre Dame Football on Showtime, which premiered on Tuesday September 8, 2015. It followed Fighting Irish football players and coaches at University of Notre Dame in South Bend, Indiana. Each episode reviews highlights of every football game played during the current season of Notre Dame football. The series was narrated by actor and Fighting Irish fan Barry Pepper. The tagline was "It's more than just a game."

== Rankings ==
Ranking movements Legend: ██ Increase in ranking ██ Decrease in ranking
	Week															
Poll	Pre	1	2	3	4	5	6	7	8	9	10	11	12	13	14	Final
AP	11	9	8	6	6	15	14	11	9	8	6	5	4	9	8	11
Coaches	11	11	10	8	7	15	13	10	9	9	6	5	4	10	9	12
CFP	Not released									5	4	4	6	8	8	Not released

== Game summaries ==
=== Texas ===
Texas at Notre Dame

Team	1	2	3	4	Total
Longhorns	0	0	3	0	3
• No. 11 Fighting Irish	14	3	14	7	38

- Date: September 5, 2015
- Location: Notre Dame Stadium
  South Bend, IN
- Game start: 7:42 p.m. EDT
- Elapsed time: 3 hours and 11 minutes
- Game attendance: 80,795
- Game weather: Temperature: 82 °F (28 °C) • Weather: Clear • Wind: E 3 MPH
- Referee: Mike Defee
- TV announcers (NBC): Dan Hicks, Doug Flutie and Kathryn Tappen (sideline)

Notre Dame started the year out strong by beating Texas by a score of 38–3. Notre Dame quarterback Malik Zaire completed 19 of 22 passes for 313 yards and three touchdowns. The Irish offense outgained Texas 527 to 163 and had 30 first downs compared to eight for the Longhorns.

=== Virginia ===
Notre Dame at Virginia

Team	1	2	3	4	Total
• No. 9 Fighting Irish	12	0	14	8	34
Cavaliers	0	14	0	13	27

- Date: September 12, 2015
- Location: Scott Stadium
  Charlottesville, VA
- Game start: 3:36 p.m. EDT
- Elapsed time: 3 hours and 36 minutes
- Game attendance: 58,200
- Game weather: Temperature: 73 °F (23 °C) • Weather: Cloudy • Wind: SSW 4 MPH
- Referee: Gary Patterson
- TV announcers (ABC): Mike Patrick, Ed Cunningham and Jerry Punch (sideline)

While leading 26–14 midway through the third quarter, the Irish lost their starting Quarterback Malik Zaire to a broken ankle. Virginia took advantage, scoring two touchdowns in the fourth quarter to take the lead 27–26 with 1:54 left in the game. Irish backup quarterback DeShone Kizer then led Notre Dame on a game-winning drive. Kizer converted a 4th and 2 with a four-yard run and then three plays later hit Will Fuller with a 39-yard touchdown pass with :12 left in the game to seal the win for the Irish. It was reported after the game that Zaire would be out for the remainder of the season.

=== Georgia Tech ===
Georgia Tech at Notre Dame

Team	1	2	3	4	Total
No. 14 Yellow Jackets	0	7	0	15	22
• No. 8 Fighting Irish	7	6	3	14	30

- Date: September 19, 2015
- Location: Notre Dame Stadium
  South Bend, IN
- Game start: 3:42 p.m. EDT
- Elapsed time: 3 hours 32 minutes
- Game attendance: 80,795
- Game weather: Temperature: 66 °F (19 °C) • Weather: Clear • Wind: NW 15 MPH
- Referee: Jeff Flanagan
- TV announcers (NBC): Dan Hicks, Doug Flutie and Kathryn Tappen (sideline)

Despite being ranked higher than Georgia Tech in both the AP and Coach's Polls, Notre Dame would come into the game as underdogs, due to the injury to starting QB Malik Zaire. 19 year old quarterback DeShone Kizer would make his first career start. The result would be an impressive Irish win, 30–22. Despite the score, Notre Dame thoroughly dominated the game. Irish running back C.J. Prosise would score on a 91-yard touchdown run (longest in Notre Dame Stadium history) late in the fourth quarter to put Notre Dame up by a resounding 30–7 score. The Yellow Jackets would make a rally late, but it was too late and Notre Dame would hold on for the win. Kizer would finish 21 for 30 with 242 passing yards, one touchdown pass and an interception. Georgia Tech came into the game averaging 67 points a game and 457 rush yards a game, but the Irish defense would stifle them, holding them to just 216 rush yards and not allowing the Yellow Jackets to convert a third down until the fourth quarter.

=== UMass ===
UMass at Notre Dame

Team	1	2	3	4	Total
Minutemen	6	14	0	7	27
• No. 6 Fighting Irish	14	21	20	7	62

- Date: September 26, 2015
- Location: Notre Dame Stadium
  South Bend, IN
- Game start: 3:40 p.m. EDT
- Elapsed time: 3 hours and 30 minutes
- Game attendance: 80,795
- Game weather: Temperature: 75 °F (24 °C) • Weather: Partly Sunny • Wind: W 13 MPH
- Referee: Pat Garvey
- TV announcers (NBC): Tom Hammond, Doug Flutie and Kathryn Tappen (sideline)

Though Notre Dame would have just a 21–20 lead over heavy underdog UMass, the Irish would score 41 consecutive points to put the game out of reach. Notre Dame would accumulate 681 total yards of offense, 457 of it from rushing and would score 62 points. It was the most points the Irish would score since 1996, when they beat Rutgers 62–0.

=== Clemson ===
Notre Dame at Clemson

Team	1	2	3	4	Total
No. 6 Fighting Irish	3	0	0	19	22
• No. 11 Tigers	14	0	7	3	24

- Date: October 3, 2015
- Location: Memorial Stadium
  Clemson, SC
- Game start: 8:22 p.m. EDT
- Elapsed time: 3 hours and 20 minutes
- Game attendance: 82,415
- Game weather: Temperature: 64 °F (18 °C) • Weather: Rain • Wind: ENE 12 MPH
- Referee: Jeff Heaser
- TV announcers (ABC): Chris Fowler, Kirk Herbstreit and Heather Cox (sideline)

In a game where Notre Dame did everything it could to lose, they came just a 2-point conversion from sending the game into overtime. Down 21–3, the Irish storm back with three fourth quarter touchdowns, but failed to convert the 2 point conversion with :06 left in the game, and Clemson holds off the furious Irish comeback. Four turnovers and eight dropped passes (one which would've been a touchdown) doomed the Irish.

=== Navy ===
Navy at Notre Dame
(Rip Miller Trophy)

Team	1	2	3	4	Total
Midshipmen	7	14	3	0	24
• No. 15 Fighting Irish	7	17	14	3	41

- Date: October 10, 2015
- Location: Notre Dame Stadium
  South Bend, IN
- Game start: 3:40 p.m. EDT
- Elapsed time: 3 hours and 14 minutes
- Game attendance: 80,795
- Game weather: Temperature: 63 °F (17 °C) • Weather: Sunny • Wind: W 8 MPH
- Referee: Michael Roche
- TV announcers (NBC): Tom Hammond, Doug Flutie and Kathryn Tappen (sideline)

=== USC ===
USC at Notre Dame
(Jeweled Shillelagh)

Team	1	2	3	4	Total
Trojans	10	14	7	0	31
• No. 14 Fighting Irish	21	3	0	17	41

- Date: October 17, 2015
- Location: Notre Dame Stadium
  South Bend, IN
- Game start: 7:42 p.m. EDT
- Elapsed time: 3 hours and 23 minutes
- Game attendance: 80,795
- Game weather: Temperature: 43 °F (6 °C) • Weather: Partly Cloudy • Wind: WNW 7 MPH
- Referee: Land Clark
- TV announcers (NBC): Dan Hicks, Doug Flutie and Kathryn Tappen (sideline)

Looking to get revenge after last years blowout loss to USC, the Irish would respond by defeating the Trojans 41–31. USC would get the ball first and score a touchdown. It was the third consecutive game the Irish allowed an opponent to score an opening drive touchdown. The Irish would return the favor with a 75-yard touchdown pass from quarterback Deshone Kizer to Will Fuller on their first offensive play of the game to even the score at seven. Later in the first, Notre Dame would block a USC punt and Amir Carlisle would return it for a touchdown. Notre dame would score 21 first quarter points, the most the Irish have scored in the first quarter against USC in the history of the rivalry. After taking a 24–10 lead in the second, the Trojans would score 21 unanswered points to take a 31–24 lead in the third quarter. In the fourth quarter, the Irish would take control and score 17 unanswered points themselves. Deshone Kizer's ten-yard touchdown pass to Corey Robinson would give Notre Dame a 38–31 lead, and put the Irish up for good. The 41 points the Irish scored against USC would be the most since 1977.

=== Temple ===
Notre Dame at Temple

Team	1	2	3	4	Total
• No. 9 Fighting Irish	7	7	3	7	24
No. 21 Owls	3	7	0	10	20

- Date: October 31, 2015
- Location: Lincoln Financial Field
  Philadelphia, PA
- Game start: 8:15 p.m. EDT
- Elapsed time: 3 hours and 24 minutes
- Game attendance: 69,280
- Game weather: Temperature: 52 °F (11 °C) • Weather: Mostly Cloudy • Wind: SSE 3 MPH
- Referee: Tracy Jones
- TV announcers (ABC): Chris Fowler, Kirk Herbstreit and Heather Cox (sideline)

For this Primetime matchup, the Irish would travel to Philadelphia for a game against the 7–0 Temple Owls. For the first time in Temple school history, the Owls would host a top ranked team while ranked themselves. Despite Temple sporting the 14th best defense in the country, Notre Dame came into this game as double digit favorites. Notre Dame would outgain Temple in yardage 467 to 295, but turnovers and consistent miscues in the red zone by the Irish offense kept the game close. With 4:45 left in the game, and Temple leading 20–17, Irish freshman Quarterback Deshone Kizer would lead Notre Dame on a game-winning drive, finished off with a 17-yard touchdown pass to wide receiver Will Fuller. The game was sealed when Irish cornerback KeiVarae Russell intercepted Temple quarterback PJ Walker's pass with 1:09 left in the game. Deshone Kizer would finish the game with 299 passing yards and 143 yards rushing, including a 79-yard touchdown run in the second quarter.

=== Pittsburgh ===
Notre Dame at Pittsburgh
(rivalry)

Team	1	2	3	4	Total
• No. 5 Fighting Irish	7	14	7	14	42
Panthers	3	0	14	13	30

- Date: November 7, 2015
- Location: Heinz Field
  Pittsburgh, PA
- Game start: 12:05 p.m. EST
- Elapsed time: 3 hours and 28 minutes
- Game attendance: 68,400
- Game weather: Temperature: 52 °F (11 °C) • Weather: Cloudy • Wind: 9 MPH W
- Referee: Jeff Flanagan
- TV announcers (ABC): Sean McDonough, Chris Spielman and Todd McShay (sideline)

Notre Dame's 12 point win is the largest margin of victory over Pittsburgh since 2005. Up until today, nine out of the last ten games were decided by 8 points or less.

=== Wake Forest ===
Wake Forest at Notre Dame

Team	1	2	3	4	Total
Demon Deacons	0	0	7	0	7
• No. 4 Fighting Irish	14	7	0	7	28

- Date: November 14, 2015
- Location: Notre Dame Stadium
  South Bend, IN
- Game start: 3:40 p.m. EST
- Elapsed time: 2 hours and 59 minutes
- Game attendance: 80,795
- Game weather: Temperature: 52 °F (11 °C) • Weather: Clear Skies and Sunny • Wind: S 10 MPH
- Referee: Jeff Flanagan
- TV announcers (NBC): Dan Hicks, Doug Flutie and Kathryn Tappen (sideline)

Freshman running back Josh Adams, who was fourth on the depth chart during the summer, broke off for a Notre Dame record 98 yard rushing touchdown. It was the longest play from scrimmage in the FBS this year and tied for NCAAF record for longest run by a freshman. Despite looking sluggish all day, the Irish were able to keep Wake Forest out of the endzone for the most part and win 28–7. Wake Forest had more passing yards, total yards, first downs and red zone trips than the Irish.

=== Boston College ===
Notre Dame vs Boston College
(Holy War / Shamrock Series)

Team	1	2	3	4	Total
Eagles	0	0	3	13	16
• No. 4 Fighting Irish	10	0	6	3	19

- Date: November 21, 2015
- Location: Fenway Park
  Boston, MA
- Game start: 7:43 p.m. EST
- Elapsed time: 3 hours and 22 minutes
- Game attendance: 38,686
- Game weather: Temperature: 42 °F (6 °C) • Weather: Mostly cloudy • Wind: ENE 7 MPH
- Referee: David Epperley
- TV announcers (NBCSN): Dan Hicks, Doug Flutie and Kathryn Tappen (sideline)

Notre Dame's explosive offense would rack up 447 yards of offense against Boston College's defense, which was the #1 ranked defense in the country. But 5 Notre Dame turnovers kept the game closer than it should have been. Notre Dame's defense would only give up 88 passing yards, but failure to score in the redzone continued for the Irish, which leads the country in red zone turnovers with 15.

=== Stanford ===
Notre Dame at Stanford
(Legends Trophy)

Team	1	2	3	4	Total
No. 6 Fighting Irish	7	13	9	7	36
• No. 9 Cardinal	14	7	7	10	38

- Date: November 28, 2015
- Location: Stanford Stadium
  Stanford, CA
- Game start: 4:35 p.m. PST
- Elapsed time: 3 hours and 20 minutes
- Game attendance: 51,424
- Game weather: Temperature: 55 °F (13 °C) • Weather: Perfect • Wind: 7 MPH
- Referee: Duane Heydt
- TV announcers (Fox): Gus Johnson, Joel Klatt and Molly McGrath (sideline)

In arguably one of the best college football games of the year, a game that had ten lead changes and almost 1,000 yards of offense, Notre Dame's playoff hopes ended as Stanford kicker Conrad Ukropina hit a game-winning field goal as time expired. With 6:48 left in the game, and the Irish trailing 35–29, the Irish marched 88 yards in 15 plays (using up 6:18 of the game clock). The drive was capped off by Irish Quarterback Deshone Kizer's two-yard touchdown run to give Notre Dame the lead with just :30 left in the game. The Irish defense could not hold, however, as Stanford drove 45 yards in just 28 seconds to finish off the game with the win.

The Irish offense accumulated 533 yards of offense, 299 of those yards from rushing. The Irish had three scores of over 62 yards in the game. The first was a 93-yard kickoff return for a touchdown by C.J. Sanders. The second was a Deshone Kizer 73-yard touchdown pass to Will Fuller. And the third was a 62-yard rushing touchdown by Freshman running back Josh Adams. At one point in the second half, the Irish offense was averaging 11.6 yards a play.

The Irish defense left a lot to be desired though as they allowed Stanford's offense to have touchdown drives of 75, 78, 75, 76 and 74. And the most costly, allowing Stanford to get into field goal range with :30 left in the game. Stanford scored five touchdowns in five red zone trips.

=== Ohio State (Fiesta Bowl) ===
Notre Dame vs Ohio State
(Fiesta Bowl)

Team	1	2	3	4	Total
No. 8 Fighting Irish	0	14	7	7	28
• No. 7 Buckeyes	14	14	7	9	44

- Date: January 1, 2016
- Location: University of Phoenix Stadium
  Glendale, AZ
- Game start: 11:07 a.m. MST
- Elapsed time: 3 hours and 31 minutes
- Game attendance: 71,123
- Game weather: Temperature: N/A • Weather: Indoors • Wind: N/A
- Referee: Hubert Owens
- TV announcers (ESPN): Sean McDonough, Chris Spielman and Todd McShay (sideline)

== Personnel ==
2015 Notre Dame Fighting Irish football team roster
Players
Coaches
Offense

Pos.	#	Name	Class
WR	2	Chris Brown	Sr
WR	3	Amir Carlisle	GS
QB	4	Montgomery VanGorder	So
WR	7	Will Fuller	Jr
QB	8	Malik Zaire	Jr
WR	9	C.J. Sanders	Fr
TE	10	Alizé Jones	Fr
WR	11	Justin Brent	So
QB	12	Brandon Wimbush	Fr
TE	13	Tyler Luatua	So
QB	14	DeShone Kizer	So
WR	15	Corey Holmes	So
WR	16	Torii Hunter Jr.	Jr
QB	17	Nolan Henry	Fr
TE	18	Chase Hounshell	GS
QB	19	Robert Regan	Fr
RB	20	C.J. Prosise	Sr
RB	25	Tarean Folston	Jr
WR	26	Austin Webster	So
RB	28	Austin Ross	Jr
WR	32	Cam Bryan	GS
RB	33	Josh Adams	Fr
RB	34	Dexter Williams	Fr
WR	35	Grant Hammann	So
WR	37	Omar Hunter	Jr
RB	46	Josh Anderson	Sr
RB	49	Bailey Ross	Jr
OL	53	Sam Mustipher	So
OL	56	Quenton Nelson	So
OL	57	Trevor Ruhland	Fr
OL	60	John Montelus	Jr
OL	62	Colin McGovern	Jr
OL	63	Sam Bush	So
OL	66	Tristen Hoge	Fr
OL	67	Jimmy Byrne	So
OL	68	Mike McGlinchey	Jr
OL	70	Hunter Bivin	Jr
OL	71	Alex Bars	So
C	72	Nick Martin	GS
OL	75	Mark Harrell	Sr
OL	78	Ronnie Stanley	Sr
OL	79	Steve Elmer	Jr
TE	80	Durham Smythe	Jr
WR	81	Miles Boykin	Fr
TE	82	Nic Weishar	So
WR	83	Jalen Guyton	Fr
TE	84	Ben Suttman	Jr
WR	85	Buster Sheridan	Jr
WR	86	Equanimeous St. Brown	Fr
WR	87	Keenan Centlivre	So
WR	88	Corey Robinson	Jr

Defense

Pos.	#	Name	Class
LB	4	Te'von Coney	Fr
LB	5	Nyles Morgan	So
CB	6	KeiVarae Russell	Sr
S	8	Avery Sebastian	GS
LB	9	Jaylon Smith	Jr
S	10	Max Redfield	Jr
CB	12	Devin Butler	Jr
DB	14	Shaun Crawford	Fr
LB	17	James Onwualu	Jr
DB	18	Mykelti Williams	Fr
CB	21	Nick Watkins	So
S	22	Elijah Shumate	Sr
S	23	Drue Tranquill	So
DB	24	Nick Coleman	Fr
DB	25	Travis Allen	Sr
DB	26	Ashton White	Fr
LB	27	Asmar Bilal	Fr
DB	28	Nicco Fertitta	Fr
S	29	Nicky Baratti	Sr
LB	30	Josh Barajas	Fr
S	31	John Turner	Sr
S	32	Nick Ossello	GS
CB	34	Jesse Bongiovi	Jr
DB	35	Chris Finke	Fr
CB	36	Cole Luke	Jr
LB	38	Joe Schmidt	GS
S	39	Drew Recker	Jr
LB	40	Kier Murphy	Fr
CB	41	Matthias Farley	GS
LB	42	Jimmy Thompson	Fr
DL	44	Doug Randolph	Jr
DL	45	Romeo Okwara	Sr
S	46	Eamon McOsker	Sr
CB	47	Connor Cavalaris	GS
LB	48	Greer Martini	So
LB	49	Brandon Hutson	Fr
LB	51	Devyn Spruell	Fr
DL	54	Lincoln Feist	Fr
DL	55	Jonathan Bonner	So
DL	58	Elijah Taylor	Fr
LB	59	Jarrett Grace	GS
DL	64	Ryan Kilander	So
DL	75	Daniel Cage	So
DL	77	Brandon Tiassum	Fr
DL	87	Patrick Mazza	Jr
DL	89	Jacob Matuska	Jr
DL	90	Isaac Rochell	Jr
DL	91	Sheldon Day	Sr
DL	92	Grant Blankenship	So
DL	93	Jay Hayes	So
DL	94	Jarron Jones	Sr
DL	95	Marquis Dickerson	Jr
DL	96	Pete Mokwuah	So
DL	97	Micah Dew-Treadway	Fr
DL	98	Andrew Trumbetti	So
DL	99	Jerry Tillery	Fr

Special teams

Pos.	#	Name	Class
K	19	Justin Yoon	Fr
K	29	Sam Kohler	So
LS	40	Kyle Conrad	Fr
K	42	Jeff Riney	Fr
K	43	John Chereson	Jr
LS	61	Scott Daly	Sr
P	85	Tyler Newsome	So
LS	99	Hunter Smith	Sr

Head coach

- Brian Kelly

Coordinators/assistant coaches

- Bob Elliott – Special Assistant to the Head Coach
- Paul Longo – Director of Football Strength and Conditioning
- Mike Denbrock – Associate Head Coach/Wide Receivers
- Brian VanGorder – Defensive Coordinator
- Mike Sanford – Offensive Coordinator/Quarterbacks
- Mike Elston – Recruiting Coordinator/Linebackers
- Scott Booker – Special Teams Coordinator/Tight Ends
- Autry Denson – Running Backs
- Harry Hiestand – Offensive Line
- Keith Gilmore – Defensive Line
- Todd Lyght – Defensive Backs
- Maurice Crum Jr. – Graduate Assistant (Defense)
- Mike Hiestand – Graduate Assistant (Defense)
- Ryan Mahaffey – Graduate Assistant (Offense)
- Donovan Raiola – Graduate Assistant (Offense)
- Jeff Quinn – Offensive Analyst
- Pryce Tracy – Special Teams Analyst
- Jake Flint – Assistant Director of Strength and Conditioning
- Aaron Welman – Assistant Director of Strength and Conditioning
- David Grimes – Assistant Strength and Conditioning Coach
- Dwight Allison – Sports Nutrition Program Director
- Tim Collins – Video Coordinator
- Julie DeBuysser – Senior Staff Assistant-Assistant Coaches
- Ryan Grooms – Head Football Equipment Manager
- Rob Hunt – Head Football Athletic Trainer
- Chad Klunder – Associate Athletic Director for Football Operations
- Joy McCausland – Senior Staff Assistant
- Jason Michelson – Coordinator of Football Operations
- David Peloquin – Director of Player Personnel
- Ron Powlus – Director of Player Development
- Beth Rex – Director of Football Administration
- Dr. Chris Balint – Orthopedic Surgeon
- Mike Bean – Associate Athletic Trainer
- Dr. Jerry Hofferth – Chiropractor
- Jasmine Johnson – Recruiting Assistant
- Aaryn Kearney – Coordinator of Recruiting Operations
- Dr. Matt Leiszler – Team Physician
- Aaron Menard – Assistant Video Coordinator
- Adam Myers – Assistant Football Equipment Manager
- Luke Pitcher – Recruiting Creative Lead
- Dr. Brian Ratigan – Orthopedic Surgeon
- Steve Smith – Assistant Athletic Trainer
- Anna Turner – Sports Nutrition Associate

Legend

- (C) Team captain
- (S) Suspended
- (I) Ineligible
- Injured
- Redshirt

Roster

=== Recruiting class ===
Notre Dame received 24 commitments including one five-star, Alizé Jones. The class included student-athletes from 13 different states.

College recruiting (2015)
Name	Hometown	School	Height	Weight	40^{‡}	Commit date
Josh Adams; RB	Warrington, Pennsylvania	Central Bucks South HS	6 ft 2 in (1.88 m)	208 lb (94 kg)	–	Jun 30, 2014
Josh Adams; RB	Recruit ratings: Scout: Rivals: (77)					
Josh Barajas; LB	Valparaiso, Indiana	Andrean HS	6 ft 3 in (1.91 m)	215 lb (98 kg)	–	May 30, 2014
Josh Barajas; LB	Recruit ratings: Scout: Rivals: (80)					
Asmar Bilal; LB	Indianapolis, Indiana	Ben Davis HS	6 ft 2 in (1.88 m)	205 lb (93 kg)	–	Oct 16, 2014
Asmar Bilal; LB	Recruit ratings: Scout: Rivals: (80)					
Miles Boykin; WR	Tinley Park, Illinois	Providence Catholic HS	6 ft 4 in (1.93 m)	220 lb (100 kg)	4.41	Jul 2, 2014
Miles Boykin; WR	Recruit ratings: Scout: Rivals: (80)					
Nick Coleman; CB	Dayton, Ohio	Archbishop Alter HS	6 ft 0 in (1.83 m)	170 lb (77 kg)	–	Jun 12, 2014
Nick Coleman; CB	Recruit ratings: Scout: Rivals: (78)					
Te'von Coney; LB	Palm Beach Gardens, Florida	Palm Beach Gardens HS	6 ft 1 in (1.85 m)	222 lb (101 kg)	–	Oct 23, 2014
Te'von Coney; LB	Recruit ratings: Scout: Rivals: (80)					
Shaun Crawford; CB	Lakewood, Ohio	St. Edward High School (Lakewood, OH)	5 ft 9.5 in (1.77 m)	170 lb (77 kg)	4.50	Jun 15, 2014
Shaun Crawford; CB	Recruit ratings: Scout: Rivals: (82)					
Micah Dew-Treadway; DE/DT	Bolingbrook, Illinois	Bolingbrook HS	6 ft 5 in (1.96 m)	275 lb (125 kg)	–	Jun 11, 2014
Micah Dew-Treadway; DE/DT	Recruit ratings: Scout: Rivals: (79)					
Nicco Fertitta; S	Las Vegas, Nevada	Bishop Gorman HS	5 ft 9 in (1.75 m)	175 lb (79 kg)	–	Jul 17, 2013
Nicco Fertitta; S	Recruit ratings: Scout: Rivals: (74)					
Jalen Guyton; WR	Irving, Texas	Allen HS	6 ft 1 in (1.85 m)	190 lb (86 kg)	–	Mar 30, 2014
Jalen Guyton; WR	Recruit ratings: Scout: Rivals: (80)					
Tristen Hoge; OC	Pocatello, Idaho	Highland HS	6 ft 4 in (1.93 m)	276 lb (125 kg)	–	Dec 7, 2013
Tristen Hoge; OC	Recruit ratings: Scout: Rivals: (83)					
Aliz'e Jones; TE	Las Vegas, Nevada	Bishop Gorman HS	6 ft 4.5 in (1.94 m)	218 lb (99 kg)	–	Jan 15, 2015
Aliz'e Jones; TE	Recruit ratings: Scout: Rivals: (86)					
Trevor Ruhland; OG	Cary, Illinois	Cary-Grove HS	6 ft 4 in (1.93 m)	270 lb (120 kg)	–-	Apr 23, 2014
Trevor Ruhland; OG	Recruit ratings: Scout: Rivals: (80)					
C. J. Sanders; WR	Granada Hills, California	Notre Dame HS	5 ft 9 in (1.75 m)	177 lb (80 kg)	4.32	May 6, 2014
C. J. Sanders; WR	Recruit ratings: Scout: Rivals: (80)					
Equanimeous St. Brown; WR	Anaheim, California	Servite HS	6 ft 5 in (1.96 m)	205 lb (93 kg)	4.44	Feb 4, 2015
Equanimeous St. Brown; WR	Recruit ratings: Scout: Rivals: (84)					
Elijah Taylor; DT	Cincinnati, Ohio	Moeller HS	6 ft 3 in (1.91 m)	285 lb (129 kg)	–	Jun 13, 2014
Elijah Taylor; DT	Recruit ratings: Scout: Rivals: (79)					
Brandon Tiassum; DT	Indianapolis, Indiana	Park Tudor School	6 ft 5 in (1.96 m)	285 lb (129 kg)	–	Jun 8, 2014
Brandon Tiassum; DT	Recruit ratings: Scout: Rivals: (78)					
Jerry Tillery; DT	Shreveport, Louisiana	Evangel Christian Academy	6 ft 6 in (1.98 m)	308 lb (140 kg)	–	Jun 22, 2013
Jerry Tillery; DT	Recruit ratings: Scout: Rivals: (81)					
Bo Wallace; DE/LB	New Orleans, Louisiana	John Curtis Christian HS	6 ft 5 in (1.96 m)	213 lb (97 kg)	–	Oct 12, 2014
Bo Wallace; DE/LB	Recruit ratings: Scout: Rivals: (80)					
Ashton White; CB	Clinton, Maryland	Bishop McNamara HS	5 ft 11 in (1.80 m)	182 lb (83 kg)	–	Jul 2, 2014
Ashton White; CB	Recruit ratings: Scout: Rivals: (79)					
Dexter Williams; RB	Orlando, Florida	West Orange HS	6 ft 0 in (1.83 m)	192 lb (87 kg)	4.54	Nov 1, 2013
Dexter Williams; RB	Recruit ratings: Scout: Rivals: (84)					
Mykelti Williams; S	Indianapolis, Indiana	Warren Central HS	6 ft 0 in (1.83 m)	198 lb (90 kg)	–	Dec 19, 2014
Mykelti Williams; S	Recruit ratings: Scout: Rivals: (76)					
Brandon Wimbush; QB	Hackensack, New Jersey	St. Peters Prep School	6 ft 2 in (1.88 m)	205 lb (93 kg)	4.65	Oct 7, 2014
Brandon Wimbush; QB	Recruit ratings: Scout: Rivals: (86)					
Justin Yoon; K	Nashville, Tennessee	Milton Academy	5 ft 11 in (1.80 m)	185 lb (84 kg)	–	Jun 24, 2014
Justin Yoon; K	Recruit ratings: Scout: Rivals: (78)					
Overall recruit ranking: Scout: 7 Rivals: 11 ESPN: 13
‡ Refers to 40-yard dash; Note: In many cases, Scout, Rivals, 247Sports, On3, and ESPN may conflict in their listings of height, weight and 40 time.; In these cases, the average was taken. ESPN grades are on a 100-point scale.; Sources: "2015 Notre Dame Football Commitment List". Rivals.; "Scout.com Football Recruiting: Notre Dame". Scout.; "2015 Player Commitments – Notre Dame". ESPN.; "Scout.com Team Recruiting Rankings". Scout.; "2015 Team Ranking". Rivals.com.

== Statistics ==
Passing

1. DeShone Kizer (QB) - 211 of 335 (63.0%) for 2,884 yards, 21 touchdowns, 10 interceptions, 150.0 passer rating
2. Malik Zaire (QB) - 26 of 40 (65.0%) for 428 yards, 4 touchdowns, 0 interceptions, 187.9 passer rating

Rushing

1. C.J. Prosise (RB) - 1,032 yards on 156 carries, 6.6-yard average, 11 touchdowns
2. Josh Adams (RB) - 835 yards on 117 carries, 7.1-yard average, 6 touchdowns
3. DeShone Kizer (QB) - 520 yards on 134 carries, 3.9-yard average, 10 touchdowns
4. Malik Zaire (QB) - 103 yards on 19 carries, 5.4-yard average, 0 touchdowns
5. Brandon Wimbush (QB) - 96 yards on 7 carries, 13.7-yard average, 1 touchdown

Receiving

1. Will Fuller (WR) - 62 receptions for 1,258 yards, 20.3-yard average, 14 touchdowns
2. Chris Brown (WR) - 48 receptions for 597 yards, 12.4-yard average, 4 touchdowns
3. Torii Hunter Jr. (WR) - 28 receptions for 363 yards, 13.0-yard average, 2 touchdowns
4. Amir Carlisle (WR) - 32 receptions for 355 yards, 11.1-yard average, 1 touchdown
5. C.J. Prosise (RB) - 26 receptions for 308 yards, 11.8-yard average, 1 touchdown
6. Corey Robinson (RB) - 16 receptions for 200 yards, 12.5-yard average, 1 touchdown
7. Alizé Mack (TE) - 13 receptions for 190 yards, 14.6-yard average, 0 touchdowns

Scoring

1. Justin Yoon (K) - 95 points, 50 of 52 PAT, 15 of 17 field goals
2. Will Fuller (WR) - 84 points, 14 touchdowns
3. C.J. Prosise (RB) - 72 points, 12 touchdowns
4. DeShone Kizer (QB) - 60 points, 10 touchdowns
5. Josh Adams (RB) - 42 points, 7 touchdowns
6. Chris Brown (WR) - 24 points, 4 touchdowns

Tackles

1. Jaylon Smith (LB) - 114 total tackles, 69 solo tackles, 9.0 tackles for loss, 1.0 sacks
2. Joe Schmidt (LB) - 78 total tackles, 42 solo tackles, 4.0 tackles for loss, 2.0 sacks
3. Elijah Shumate (S) - 70 total tackles, 52 solo tackles, 6.5 tackles for loss, 0 sacks
4. Max Redfield (S) - 64 total tackles, 39 solo tackles, 2.0 tackles for loss, 1.0 sacks
5. Isaac Rochell (DL) - 63 total tackles, 31 solo tackles, 7.5 tackles for loss, 1.0 sacks
6. KeiVarae Russell (CB) - 60 total tackles, 48 solo tackles, 3.5 tackles for loss, 1.0 sacks
7. Romeo Okwara (DL) - 48 total tackles, 31 tackles for loss, 12.5 tackles for loss, 8.0 sacks
8. Sheldon Day - 45 total tackles, 33 solo tackles, 15.5 tackles for loss, 4.0 sacks

== Awards and honors ==
All-Americans

Name	AP	AFCA	FWAA	TSN	WCFF	Athlon	CBS	ESPN	FOX	PFW	Rivals	Scout	SI.com	USAT
Sheldon Day, DT	2		2			2						2	HM	1
Will Fuller, RE	2		2	2		2	2		2			2	2	2
Nick Martin, C													HM	
C. J. Prosise, RB													HM	
Jaylon Smith, LB	1	1	2	1	1	1	1		1			1	1	1
Ronnie Stanley, OT	2	1	1	1	1	2	1	1	2			2	2	
†denotes unanimous selection. NCAA recognizes a selection to all five of the AP, AFCA, FWAA, SN and WCFF 1st teams for unanimous selections and three of five for consensus selections

Wide receiver Will Fuller, who led the team with 14 touchdown and 1,258 receiving yards, was selected by his teammates as the most valuable player on the 2015 team.
