= 2016 Fiesta Bowl =

2016 Fiesta Bowl may refer to:

- 2016 Fiesta Bowl (January), a college football bowl game from the 2015–16 bowl season
- 2016 Fiesta Bowl (December), a college football bowl game and one of the College Football Playoff semifinal games for the 2016–17 bowl season
