= Robert M. Jacobson =

American physician (born 1958)

Robert Jacobson
- Education: Butler University
- Known for: Vaccine Research at the Mayo Clinic
- Scientific career
- Fields: Medicine, Epidemiology, Immunology, Pediatrics, Vaccinology
- Workplaces: Mayo Clinic

Robert Martin Jacobson (born 1958) is the medical director of the Population Health Science Program of the Robert D. and Patricia E. Kern Center for the Science of Health Care Delivery. He is a previous chair of the Department of Pediatric and Adolescent Medicine at the Mayo Clinic and a full professor of pediatrics at the Mayo Clinic School of Medicine in Rochester, Minnesota. He still regularly sees young patients as a member of the Division of Community Pediatric and Adolescent Medicine. His research area is in vaccinology, with a focus on delivery, effectiveness, and adverse consequences. He is also involved with the Clinical Research Training Program in the Mayo Clinic School of Medicine, where he concentrates on teaching evidence-based medicine.

From 2012 to 2014, he served as president of the Minnesota chapter of the American Academy of Pediatrics. He is a fellow of the academy.

== Education ==
Jacobson attended Warren Central High School in Indianapolis, Indiana. He received his B.S. in chemistry in 1980 from Butler University also in Indianapolis, Indiana. He then attended the Pritzker School of Medicine at the University of Chicago, receiving his M.D. in 1984. He then spent five years in the New Haven, Connecticut, area. There he completed his internship in pediatrics, became chief resident of the Pediatric Primary Care Center and finished his three-year residency at the Yale-New Haven Hospital. Jacobson also completed a two-year fellowship at the Robert Wood Johnson Clinical Scholars Program in quantitative clinical epidemiology at Yale University under the tutelage of Alvan R. Feinstein before accepting a position at the Mayo Clinic.

== Mayo Clinic ==
Jacobson arrived in Rochester, Minnesota in 1989 to practice pediatrics and perform vaccine research at the Mayo Clinic. Since then, he has published 240 peer-reviewed research papers in academic medicine. He served as the director of clinical studies for the Vaccine Research Group from 1989 to 2014 where the worked focused on vaccine immunogenicity and the genetics of vaccine response, especially towards measles, mumps and rubella as well as vaccines directed against bioterrorism including anthrax and smallpox vaccines. In 2000, he became the interim chair of the Department of Pediatric and Adolescent Medicine which includes the Mayo Eugenio Litta Children's Hospital and then in 2001 became the definitive chair. In 2010, he completed his term chair of the department to lead the Employee and Community Health (ECH) Research Initiative, which focuses on population-based interventions to improve patients' health. He now serves as the medical director of the Population Health Science Program of the Robert D. and Patricia E. Kern Center for the Science of Health Care Delivery, which supports research and education regarding community health best practices. He helped found the Population Health Sciences Scholars Program at the Mayo Clinic, which supports scholars who study community health. Immunization population health, and epidemiology continue to be a focus in his current research. In 2018, he was awarded the Mayo Clinic Distinguished Pediatric Career Award.
