= Justin Smith (linebacker) =

American football player (born 1979)

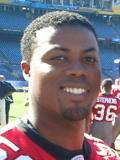
- Smith in 2003

No. 59, 53
- Position: Linebacker

Personal information
- Born: June 5, 1979 (age 47); Lafayette, Indiana, U.S.
- Listed height: 6 ft 0 in (1.83 m)
- Listed weight: 218 lb (99 kg)

Career information
- High school: Warren Central (Indianapolis, Indiana)
- College: Indiana (1998–2001)
- NFL draft: 2002: undrafted

Career history
- Tampa Bay Buccaneers (2002–2003); St. Louis Rams (2003); Arizona Cardinals (2004)*; Carolina Panthers (2005); → Amsterdam Admirals (2005)*; Chicago Bears (2006)*; → Hamburg Sea Devils (2006)
- * Offseason or practice squad member only

Awards and highlights
- Super Bowl champion (XXXVII); 2× Second-team All-Big Ten (2000, 2001)
- Stats at Pro Football Reference

Justin Curtis Smith (born June 5, 1979) is an American former professional football linebacker who played in the National Football League (NFL) with the Tampa Bay Buccaneers and St. Louis Rams. He played college football at Indiana University Bloomington. He was also a member of the Arizona Cardinals, Carolina Panthers, Amsterdam Admirals, Chicago Bears and Hamburg Sea Devils.

== Early life ==
Smith attended Warren Central High School in Indianapolis, Indiana.

== College career ==
Smith played for the Indiana Hoosiers from 1998 to 2001, earning All-Big Ten Conference honors in 2000 and 2001 and Academic All-Big Ten honors in 1998, 1999, 2000 and 2001. He was on the Butkus Award watch list in 2000 and 2001.

== Professional career ==
Smith signed with the Tampa Bay Buccaneers on April 22, 2002, after going undrafted in the 2002 NFL draft. He was released by the Buccaneers on September 2 and signed to the team's practice squad on September 4, 2002. He was promoted to the active roster on January 11, 2003, and declared inactive during second round of the playoffs. Smith earned a Super Bowl ring when the Buccaneers won Super Bowl XXXVII against the Oakland Raiders on January 26, 2003. He was released by the Buccaneers on August 31 and signed to the team's practice squad on September 3, 2003. He was promoted to the active roster on November 14, 2003. Smith was released by the Buccaneers on December 6 and re-signed to the team's practice squad on December 9, 2003. He appeared in two games for the Buccaneers during the 2003 season.

Smith was signed off the Buccaneers' practice squad by the St. Louis Rams on December 11, 2003. He played in three games for the Rams in 2003. He was released by the Rams on August 24, 2004.

Smith signed with the Arizona Cardinals on August 27, 2004. He was released by the Cardinals on August 29, 2004.

Smith was signed by the Carolina Panthers on January 12, 2005. He was allocated to NFL Europe to play for the Amsterdam Admirals on February 15, 2005. He was placed on injured reserve on September 3, 2005, causing him to miss the entire 2005 season. Smith was released by the Panthers on October 14, 2005.

Smith signed with the Chicago Bears on January 10, 2006. He was drafted by the Hamburg Sea Devils of NFL Europe on January 28, 2006. He was released by the Bears on May 30, 2006.
