= DeShone Kizer =

American football player (born 1996)

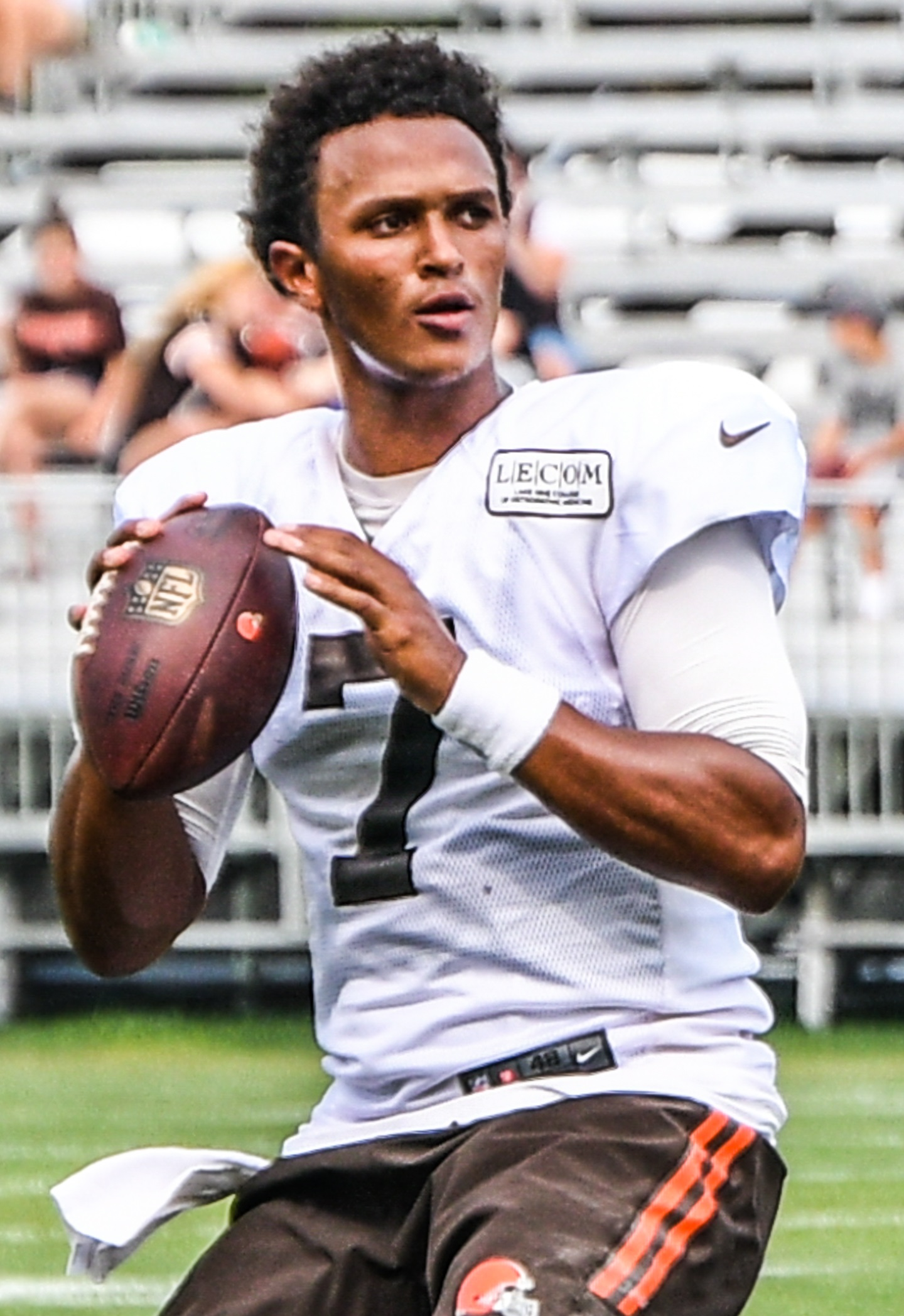
- Kizer with the Cleveland Browns in 2017

No. 7, 9
- Position: Quarterback

Personal information
- Born: January 3, 1996 (age 30); Toledo, Ohio, U.S.
- Listed height: 6 ft 4 in (1.93 m)
- Listed weight: 235 lb (107 kg)

Career information
- High school: Central Catholic (Toledo)
- College: Notre Dame (2014–2016)
- NFL draft: 2017: 2nd round, 52nd overall pick

Career history
- Cleveland Browns (2017); Green Bay Packers (2018); Oakland / Las Vegas Raiders (2019–2020); Tennessee Titans (2020–2021)*
- * Offseason or practice squad member only

Career NFL statistics
- Passing attempts: 518
- Passing completions: 275
- Completion percentage: 53.1%
- TD–INT: 11–24
- Passing yards: 3,081
- Passer rating: 58.9
- Rushing yards: 458
- Rushing touchdowns: 5
- Stats at Pro Football Reference

DeShone Allen Kizer (/ˈkaɪzər/; born January 3, 1996) is an American former professional football quarterback who played in the National Football League (NFL) for four seasons. He played college football for the Notre Dame Fighting Irish and was selected by the Cleveland Browns in the second round of the 2017 NFL draft. Kizer served as the Browns' starter as a rookie, but his tenure lasted only one year after going winless and leading the league in interceptions. Kizer spent his last three seasons as a backup for the Green Bay Packers, Las Vegas Raiders, and Tennessee Titans.

== Early life ==
Kizer attended Central Catholic High School in Toledo, Ohio. He was named the Associated Press Ohio Division III co-offensive player of the year as a senior in 2013. A three-year starter, Kizer helped lead the Fighting Irish high school football team to a combined 34–6 overall record in 2011–13 (8–2 in playoff games), including a 14–1 record and Ohio Division II state title in 2012.

In his career, Kizer's totals included 5,684 passing yards and 56 touchdowns to go with 1,211 rushing yards and 17 touchdowns.

Considered a four-star recruit by Rivals.com, Kizer was rated as the ninth best dual-threat quarterback prospect of his class. On June 11, 2013, Kizer announced his commitment to play college football at the University of Notre Dame for the Fighting Irish.

College recruiting
Name	Hometown	School	Height	Weight	Commit date
DeShone Kizer; Dual-Threat QB	Toledo, OH	Central Catholic HS	6 ft 4 in (1.93 m)	233 lb (106 kg)	Jun 11, 2013
DeShone Kizer; Dual-Threat QB	Recruit ratings: Scout: Rivals: (80)				
Overall recruit ranking: Scout: 17 (QB), 2 (regional), 1 (OH), 263 (national) Rivals: 9 (QB) ESPN: 16 (QB), 12 (OH)
Note: In many cases, Scout, Rivals, 247Sports, On3, and ESPN may conflict in their listings of height and weight.; In these cases, the average was taken. ESPN grades are on a 100-point scale.; Sources: "Notre Dame Football Commitment List". Rivals.; "Notre Dame College Football Recruiting Commits". Scout.; "ESPN". ESPN.; "Scout.com Team Recruiting Rankings". Scout.; "2015 Team Ranking". Rivals.com.

== College career ==
Kizer redshirted his first year at Notre Dame in 2014 behind quarterbacks Everett Golson and Malik Zaire.

Kizer started 2015 as a backup to Zaire. On September 5, during the season opener, Kizer made his collegiate debut against Texas in relief of Zaire in the 38–3 victory. During the second game of the season against Virginia, Kizer replaced an injured Zaire and helped lead Notre Dame to a victory. With 12 seconds left, Kizer completed a 39-yard touchdown pass to wide receiver Will Fuller to give Notre Dame the lead. After it was announced that Zaire would miss the rest of the season, Kizer was named the starter. On October 3, in a narrow 24–22 loss to Clemson, he passed for a season-high 321 yards, two touchdowns, and an interception while having 15 carries for 60 yards and a touchdown. On Halloween, in a 24–20 victory over Temple, Kizer recorded 299 passing yards, a touchdown, and two interceptions, and had a stellar night on the ground, rushing for 143 yards and two touchdowns. In the next game against Pitt, Kizer accounted for all six touchdowns (five passing and one rushing) helping Notre Dame to a 42–30 victory.

Kizer and the Fighting Irish finished the 2015 regular season with a 10–2 record. On New Year's Day, the Fighting Irish closed out their 2015 season with a 44–28 loss to Ohio State in the Fiesta Bowl. In the loss, Kizer had 284 passing yards, two touchdowns, and an interception to go along with 21 rushing yards and a touchdown. Overall, Kizer finished his redshirt first year with 2,880 passing yards, 525 rushing yards, and 31 total touchdowns in 13 games.

Kizer started the 2016 season with 215 passing yards, five passing touchdowns, 77 rushing yards, and a rushing touchdown in a double overtime 50–47 loss to Texas at Darrell K Royal–Texas Memorial Stadium. After a victory over Nevada, he had 344 passing yards and two touchdowns to go along with 14 rushing yards and two touchdowns in a 36–28 loss to Michigan State. After a loss to Duke, Kizer had a career day through the air with 471 yards and three touchdowns in a 50–33 victory over Syracuse. He put together some solid performances over the rest of the season, but the team faltered and ended up with a 4–8 record. Kizer played 12 games with 2,925 passing yards, 472 rushing yards, and 34 total touchdowns.

After the 2016 season, Kizer decided to forgo the remaining two years of eligibility and enter the 2017 NFL draft.

== Professional career ==
=== Pre-draft ===
Kizer received an invitation to the NFL Combine and completed all of the combine drills except for the bench press. He also performed positional drills, but had a disappointing performance. Kizer also participated at Notre Dame's Pro Day and only ran positional drills in front of team scouts and representatives, including San Francisco 49ers general manager John Lynch and Pittsburgh Steelers offensive coordinator Todd Haley. Kizer completed 50-of-60 passes and showed significantly better accuracy and footwork at his pro day. NFL draft experts and analysts projected Kizer to be a first- or second-round pick. He was ranked the second best quarterback in the draft by NFL analyst Bucky Brooks, the third best quarterback by NFLDraftScout.com and Sports Illustrated, and was ranked the fourth best quarterback by NFL Network analyst Mike Mayock.

Pre-draft measurables
Height	Weight	Arm length	Hand span	Wingspan	40-yard dash	10-yard split	20-yard split	20-yard shuttle	Three-cone drill	Vertical jump	Broad jump	Wonderlic
6 ft 4 1/4 in (1.94 m)	233 lb (106 kg)	33 1/8 in (0.84 m)	9 7/8 in (0.25 m)	6 ft 5 7/8 in (1.98 m)	4.83 s	1.64 s	2.84 s	4.53 s	7.40 s	30.5 in (0.77 m)	8 ft 11 in (2.72 m)	28
All values from NFL Combine

=== Cleveland Browns ===
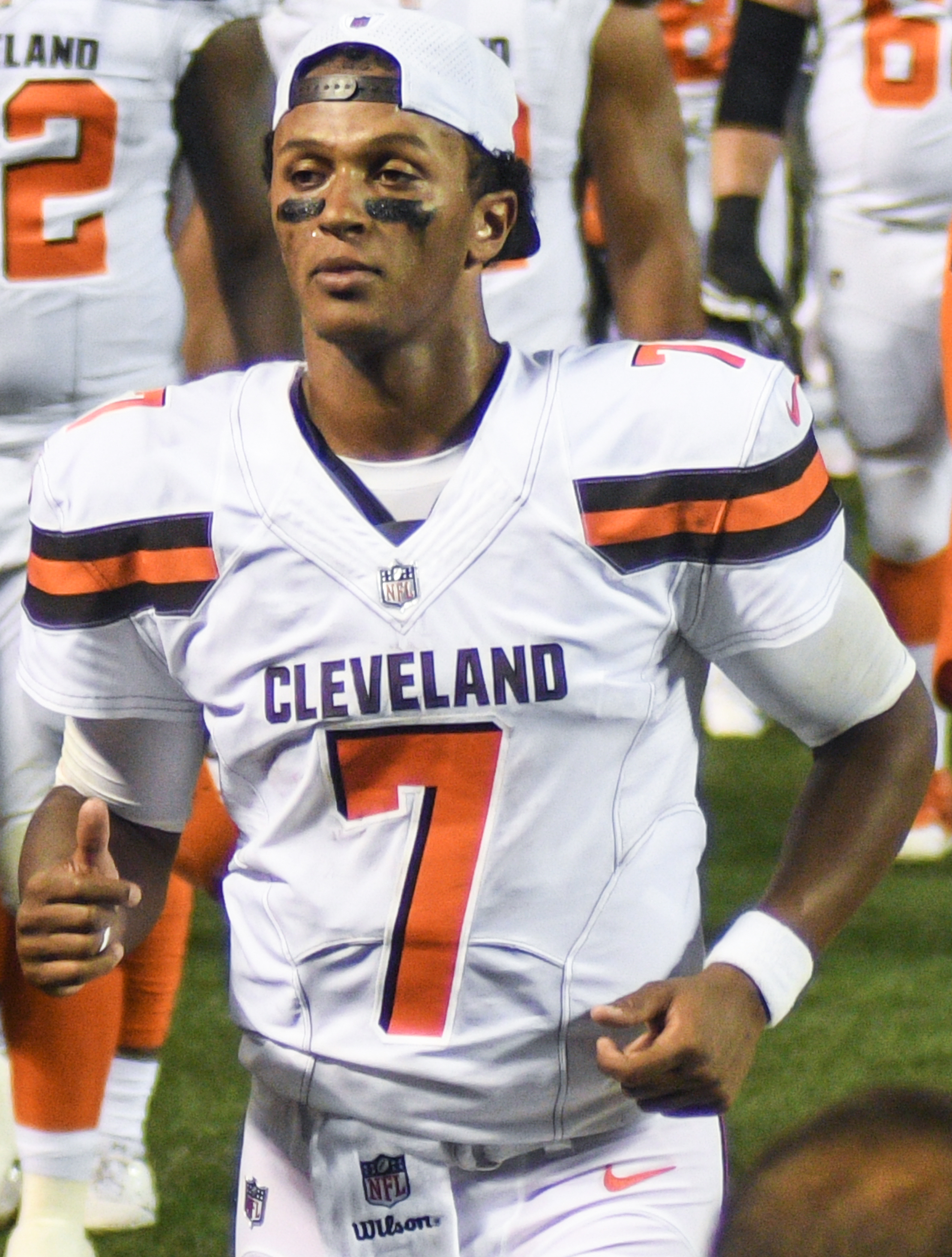
Kizer in 2017

The Cleveland Browns selected Kizer in the second round (52nd overall) of the 2017 NFL draft. He was the fourth quarterback selected and first taken in the second round.

On June 14, 2017, the Browns signed Kizer to a four-year, $4.94 million contract that includes $2.42 million guaranteed and a signing bonus of $1.73 million. On August 27, following the team's third preseason game, the Browns named Kizer as the starting quarterback to begin the regular season, beating out veteran trade acquisition Brock Osweiler and second-year quarterbacks Cody Kessler and Kevin Hogan.

Making his NFL debut on September 10, 2017, Kizer finished with 222 passing yards, a touchdown, and an interception to go along with 17 rushing yards and a one-yard touchdown, but the Browns lost by a score 21–18 at home to the Steelers. He orchestrated a 12-play drive that ended after scoring on a one-yard touchdown run. Kizer's first career passing touchdown was a three-yard pass to wide receiver Corey Coleman in the fourth quarter. Kizer started the next four games for the Browns, which were all losses. During a Week 5 17–14 loss to the New York Jets, Kizer was benched in favor of Kevin Hogan to begin the third quarter after throwing for 87 yards and an interception in the first half. Hogan was later named the starter for the team's Week 6 matchup against the Houston Texans. After Hogan's struggles in Week 6, Kizer was renamed the starter for the Week 7.

During a Week 7 12–9 overtime loss to the Tennessee Titans, Kizer threw for 114 yards and two interceptions before being benched in favor of Cody Kessler in the third quarter. Following the game, reports surfaced that Kizer was out late the Friday before the game, which caused some controversy. During a Week 14 27–21 overtime loss the Green Bay Packers, Kizer threw for 214 yards and a season-high three touchdowns, but also threw two interceptions, including one in overtime that gave the Packers excellent field position. In the regular-season finale against the Steelers, Kizer finished with a season-high 314 passing yards, two touchdowns, and an interception during the 28–24 road loss. The Browns finished the season with an 0–16 record, only the second team in NFL history to have that record.

In 15 games and starts of his rookie season, Kizer completed 53.6 percent of his passes for 2,894 yards, 11 touchdowns, and a league-leading 22 interceptions to go along with 77 carries for 419 yards and five touchdowns.

=== Green Bay Packers ===
On March 14, 2018, Kizer was traded to the Packers in exchange for Damarious Randall and a swap of both fourth and fifth-round draft picks.

During the season-opener against the Chicago Bears, Kizer played in place of an injured Aaron Rodgers in the first and second quarters, throwing for 55 yards and an interception, which was returned for a touchdown, while also losing a fumble after being strip-sacked. Rodgers returned in the third quarter and led the Packers to a narrow 24–23 comeback victory. In the regular-season finale against the Detroit Lions, Kizer played in relief of Rodgers, who had suffered a concussion, and threw for 132 yards and an interception as the Packers were shut-out by a score of 31–0.

On August 31, 2019, Kizer was released as part of the final roster cuts.

=== Oakland / Las Vegas Raiders ===
On September 1, 2019, Kizer was claimed off waivers by the Oakland Raiders.

On May 5, 2020, Kizer was waived by the relocated Las Vegas Raiders. He was re-signed to the practice squad on September 7, and was released on September 30.

=== Tennessee Titans ===
On November 24, 2020, Kizer was signed to the Tennessee Titans practice squad. He was signed to a futures contract on January 11, 2021.

Kizer entered the 2021 offseason as the third-string quarterback competing with backup Logan Woodside for the No. 2 spot behind starter Ryan Tannehill. Kizer was released on August 5, 2021, after the Titans signed quarterback Matt Barkley. Kizer was re-signed to the practice squad on November 26, but was released three days later.

== Career statistics ==
Legend
	Led the league
**Bold**	Career high

=== NFL ===
Year	Team	Games			Passing								Rushing				Fumbles	
Year	Team	GP	GS	Record	Cmp	Att	Pct	Yds	Avg	TD	Int	Rate	Att	Yds	Avg	TD	Fum	Lost
2017	CLE	15	15	0–15	**255**	**476**	**53.6**	**2,894**	**6.1**	**11**	**22**	**60.5**	**77**	**419**	5.4	**5**	**9**	**6**
2018	GB	3	0	–	20	42	47.6	187	4.5	0	2	40.5	5	39	**7.8**	0	1	1
2019	OAK	0	0	–	DNP													
2020	LV	0	0	–	DNP													
2020	TEN	0	0	–	DNP													
Career		18	15	0–15	275	518	53.1	3,081	5.9	11	24	58.9	82	458	5.6	5	10	7

=== College ===
Year	Team	Games		Passing									Rushing					Fumbles	
Year	Team	GP	GS	Cmp	Att	Pct	Yds	Avg	Lng	TD	Int	Rtg	Att	Yds	Avg	Lng	TD	Fum	Lost
2014	Notre Dame	0	0	Redshirt															
2015	Notre Dame	13	11	210	334	**62.9**	2,880	**8.6**	**81**	21	**10**	**150.1**	**135**	**525**	**3.9**	**79**	**10**	**5**	**2**
2016	Notre Dame	12	12	**212**	**361**	58.7	**2,925**	8.1	79	**26**	9	145.6	129	472	3.7	70	8	0	0
Total		25	23	422	695	60.7	5,805	8.4	81	47	19	147.7	264	997	3.8	79	18	5	2

== Personal life ==
Kizer's father, Derek, played basketball at Bowling Green from 1987 to 1991.

Kizer is the founder of One of None, an online marketplace that uses non-fungible tokens (NFTs) to authenticate its products. He is also a member of ON_Discourse, a decentralized autonomous organization (DAO) that discusses technology and business.
