= Justin Yoon =

American football player (born 1995)

Profile
- Position: Placekicker

Personal information
- Born: October 7, 1995 (age 31); Ohio, U.S.
- Listed height: 5 ft 10 in (1.78 m)
- Listed weight: 195 lb (88 kg)

Career information
- High school: Montgomery Bell Academy; Milton Academy
- College: Notre Dame (2015–2018)
- NFL draft: 2019: undrafted

Awards and highlights
- ESPN Freshman All-American (2015); FWAA Freshman All-American (2015)

Jaejung Justin Yoon (born October 7, 1995) is an American former professional football placekicker. He played college football for the Notre Dame Fighting Irish.

== High school ==
Born in Ohio, Yoon, who grew up playing ice hockey while living in Nashville, Tennessee, played both ice hockey and football while attending Milton Academy in Milton, Massachusetts. He attended Harding Academy and Montgomery Bell Academy while living in Nashville. Despite starting football in eighth grade while at Harding Academy, Yoon was 9–11 on field goals, 38–39 on point after attempts and had 37 touchbacks in 53 kickoff attempts during his junior season at Milton. As a result, he was named PrepStar All-East Region for Massachusetts. Yoon then missed much of his senior season due to injury, but was still invited to and played in the Under Armour All-America Game where he kicked three field goals of 31, 32 and 47 yards, and hit all five PAT attempts. His 47-yard field goal was the longest in the Under Armour All-America Game's history. On February 4, 2015, National Signing Day, Yoon signed to play college football at Notre Dame.

College recruiting
Name	Hometown	School	Height	Weight	Commit date
Justin Yoon; Kicker	Nashville, Tennessee	Milton Academy	5 ft 10 in (1.78 m)	185 lb (84 kg)	Jun 24, 2014
Justin Yoon; Kicker	Recruit ratings: Scout: Rivals: (78)				
Overall recruit ranking: Scout: 1 (K) Rivals: 1 (K), 1 (MA) ESPN: 2 (K), 1 (MA), 77 (regional)
Note: In many cases, Scout, Rivals, 247Sports, On3, and ESPN may conflict in their listings of height and weight.; In these cases, the average was taken. ESPN grades are on a 100-point scale.; Sources: "Notre Dame Football Commitment List". Rivals.; "Notre Dame College Football Recruiting Commits". Scout.; "ESPN". ESPN.; "Scout.com Team Recruiting Rankings". Scout.; "2015 Team Ranking". Rivals.com.

== College career ==
As starting kicker Kyle Brindza had graduated and left for the NFL the previous spring, Yoon immediately became the starting kicker for the Fighting Irish. Sophomore Tyler Newsome handled the punting and kickoff duties while Yoon handled field goals and point after attempts. After beginning the season 3–5 on FG attempts, Yoon ended the season a perfect 12–12 on field goals. He quickly became affectionately known by the moniker “YOOOON” that Notre Dame fans cheered during his kicks. By the end of the regular season, Yoon was 46–48 on PATs and 15–17 on FGs, including a 52-yarder in a win over Navy. Ranking as high as fourth in the College Football Playoff rankings, the 10–2 Fighting Irish finished the season eighth in the CFP rankings and earned a spot in the New Year's Six Fiesta Bowl. For his efforts, Yoon was named an ESPN Freshman All-American at the end of the season.

In 2018, during a 45–23 win over Virginia Tech, Yoon became Notre Dame's all-time leading scorer with 367 career points.

== Professional career ==
After being undrafted in the 2019 NFL draft, Yoon tried out for the Chicago Bears at their rookie mini-camp in early May, but was not signed.

== Personal ==
Yoon is of Korean descent. His father, Jiseop, was an Olympic figure skater. His mother, Mihwa, owns and manages a pharmacy.
