= Will Fuller =

American football player (born 1994)

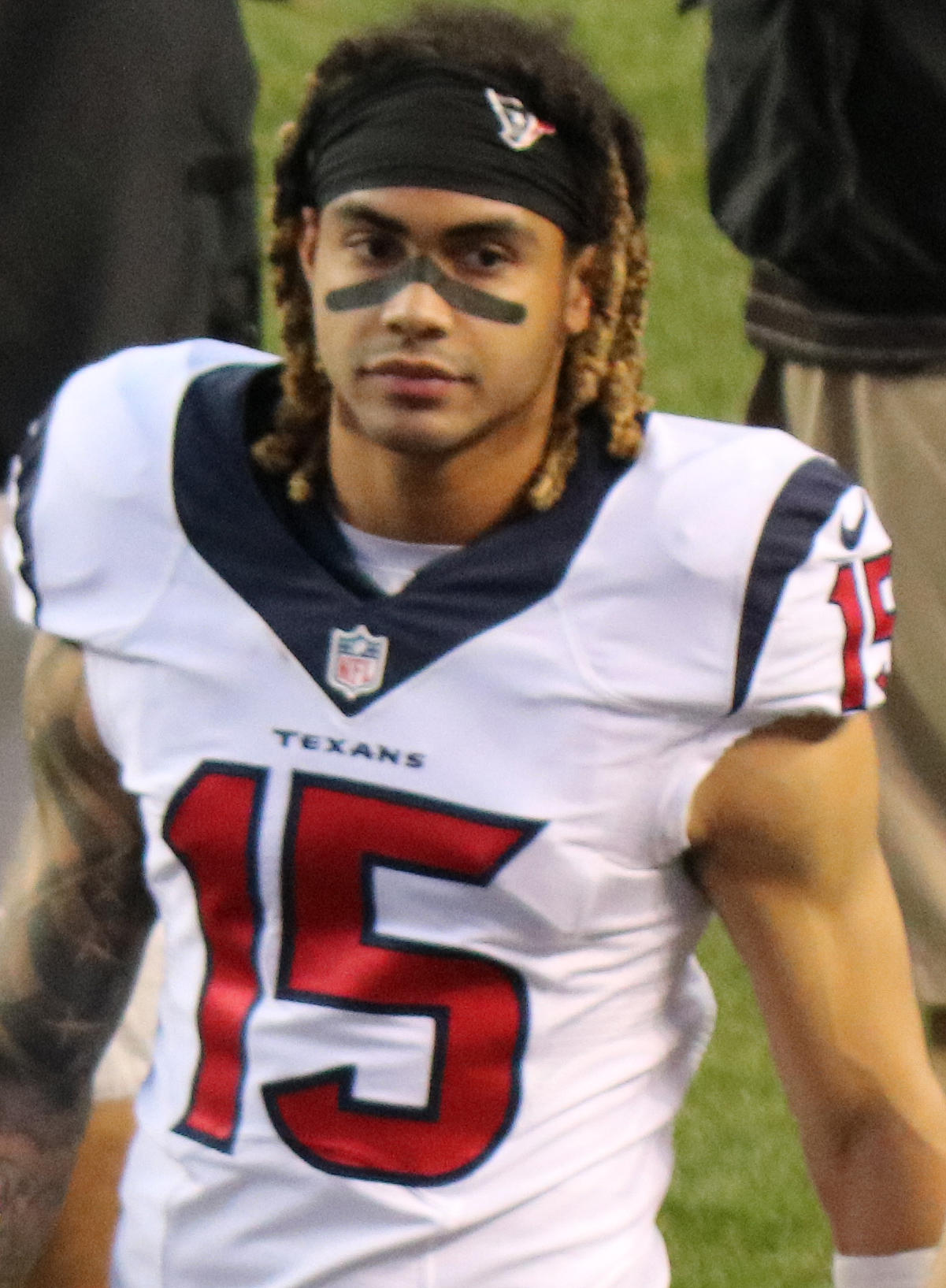
- Fuller with the Houston Texans in 2016

No. 15, 3
- Position: Wide receiver

Personal information
- Born: April 16, 1994 (age 32); Philadelphia, Pennsylvania, U.S.
- Listed height: 6 ft 1 in (1.85 m)
- Listed weight: 184 lb (83 kg)

Career information
- High school: Roman Catholic (Philadelphia)
- College: Notre Dame (2013–2015)
- NFL draft: 2016: 1st round, 21st overall pick

Career history
- Houston Texans (2016–2020); Miami Dolphins (2021)

Awards and highlights
- Second-team All-American (2015)

Career NFL statistics
- Receptions: 213
- Receiving yards: 3,136
- Return yards: 345
- Rushing yards: 6
- Total touchdowns: 25
- Stats at Pro Football Reference

William Vincent Fuller V (born April 16, 1994) is an American former professional football player who was a wide receiver in the National Football League (NFL). He played college football for the Notre Dame Fighting Irish, earning second-team All-American honors in 2015. Fuller was drafted by the Houston Texans in the first round of the 2016 NFL draft. He also played for the Miami Dolphins.

== Early life ==
One of six siblings (he has four sisters, one brother), Fuller attended Roman Catholic High School in Philadelphia, Pennsylvania, where he played high school football for the Cahillites. As a senior in 2012, Fuller was named the MVP of the Philadelphia Catholic League 4A.

Considered a four-star recruit by Rivals.com, Fuller was rated as the 19th best wide receiver prospect of his class. He originally committed to play college football for the Penn State Nittany Lions on June 3, 2012, after receiving a scholarship offer while on a visit at the school. However, Fuller would go on to switch his commitment to Notre Dame on August 5, 2012.

College recruiting
Name	Hometown	School	Height	Weight	Commit date
Will Fuller; WR	Philadelphia, PA	Roman Catholic HS	6 ft 1 in (1.85 m)	168 lb (76 kg)	Aug 5, 2012
Will Fuller; WR	Recruit ratings: Scout: Rivals: (73)				
Overall recruit ranking: Scout: 22 (WR), 3 (PA), 3 (regional), 179 (national) Rivals: 19 (WR), 7 (PA), 176 (national) ESPN: 31 (PA)
Note: In many cases, Scout, Rivals, 247Sports, On3, and ESPN may conflict in their listings of height and weight.; In these cases, the average was taken. ESPN grades are on a 100-point scale.; Sources: "Notre Dame Football Commitment List". Rivals.; "Notre Dame College Football Recruiting Commits". Scout.; "ESPN". ESPN.; "Scout.com Team Recruiting Rankings". Scout.; "2013 Team Ranking". Rivals.com.

== College career ==
Fuller played sparingly as a freshman at Notre Dame, catching only six passes for 160 yards and a touchdown. He scored his first touchdown on a 47-yard pass from Tommy Rees against Air Force on October 26, 2013. Fuller recorded two receptions for 93 yards in that game, averaging 46.5 yards per catch.

Fuller emerged as a starter his sophomore year following an impressive off-season, following that up by having a breakout season for the Irish. He had seven receptions for 133 yards and two touchdowns against North Carolina on October 11. Fuller recorded 76 receptions for 1,094 yards with 15 touchdowns, tying Golden Tate for the school single season record. Fuller's 15 touchdowns were tied for third in Football Bowl Subdivision, behind Colorado State's Rashard Higgins and Alabama's Amari Cooper. In a game against Northwestern, Fuller had nine receptions for 159 yards and three touchdowns, all career highs. Following the season, he was recognized as an honorable mention All-American by Sports Illustrated.

Fuller started off his junior season recording seven receptions for 142 yards and two touchdowns against Texas. In the next game against the Virginia Cavaliers, Fuller caught five passes for 124 yards and two touchdowns, including the game-winning touchdown pass with 12 seconds left from DeShone Kizer. He had six receptions for 131 yards and a touchdown against Georgia Tech in Notre Dame's third game of the season, a 30–22 victory. Against USC, Fuller recorded three receptions for 131 yards, including a 75-yard touchdown to beat USC by a score of 41–31. Against Pitt, he had seven receptions for 152 yards and three touchdowns, leading to 42–30 victory. Fuller's three touchdowns allowed him to surpass both Golden Tate and Jeff Samardzija on the career touchdown list with 28, leaving him only second behind Michael Floyd's 37. On November 28, against Stanford, Fuller had six receptions for 136 yards and a touchdown. He caught six passes for 113 yards, including an 81-yard touchdown, in a losing effort against Ohio State in the Fiesta Bowl.

Fuller finished the season with 62 catches and a career-high 1,258 yards with 14 touchdowns. He was named a second-team All-American by the Associated Press.

On January 3, 2016, Fuller announced he would forgo his senior year and enter the 2016 NFL draft. He finished his Notre Dame career with 144 receptions for 2,512 yards (17.4 avg) and 30 touchdowns.

== Professional career ==
=== Pre-draft ===
At the 2016 NFL Scouting Combine, Fuller ran the 40-yard dash in an official time of 4.32 seconds, which was the best time among wide receivers.

Pre-draft measurables
Height	Weight	Arm length	Hand span	40-yard dash	10-yard split	20-yard split	20-yard shuttle	Three-cone drill	Vertical jump	Broad jump	Bench press
6 ft 0 1/8 in (1.83 m)	186 lb (84 kg)	30 3/4 in (0.78 m)	8 1/4 in (0.21 m)	4.32 s	1.47 s	2.51 s	4.27 s	6.93 s	33.5 in (0.85 m)	10 ft 6 in (3.20 m)	10 reps
All values from NFL Combine

=== Houston Texans ===
==== 2016 season ====
Fuller was selected by the Houston Texans in the first round with the 21st overall pick in the 2016 NFL draft. He was the second wide receiver taken in the 2016 NFL Draft, only behind Baylor's Corey Coleman, who went to the Cleveland Browns with the 15th overall pick.

In his first NFL game against the Chicago Bears on September 11, 2016, Fuller had five receptions (on 11 targets from quarterback Brock Osweiler) for 107 yards and a touchdown as the Texans won by a score of 23–14. In the next game against the Kansas City Chiefs, he recorded four receptions for 104 yards, including a juggled catch for 53 yards, during the 19–12 victory. Two weeks later, Fuller returned a punt for a 67-yard touchdown in a 27–20 victory over the Tennessee Titans. In doing so, he became the first player in franchise history to record a punt return touchdown and a receiving touchdown in the same game (as he had a touchdown reception earlier in the game).

Fuller finished his rookie season with 47 receptions for 635 yards and two touchdowns to go along with 13 returns for 196 yards and a touchdown in 14 games and 13 starts. The Texans finished atop the AFC South with a 9–7 record and were the #4-seed in the playoffs. On January 7, 2017, Fuller made his postseason debut against the Oakland Raiders in the Wild Card Round, recording four receptions for 37 yards during the 27–14 victory. During the Divisional Round against the eventual Super Bowl LI champion New England Patriots, Fuller had three receptions for 16 yards in the 34–16 road loss.

==== 2017 season ====
On August 2, 2017, during training camp, Fuller suffered a broken collarbone and was expected to be out 2–3 months. On September 27, he was upgraded to full participation in the Texans' practice.

Fuller made his season debut during a Week 4 57–14 victory over the Titans, catching four passes for 35 yards and two touchdowns to go along with a four-yard rush. In the next game against the Chiefs, he had two receptions for 57 yards and a touchdown and rushed for five yards in the 42–34 loss. The following week, Fuller recorded two receptions for 62 yards and a touchdown as the Texans defeated the Browns by a score of 33–17. After a Week 7 bye, the Texans went on the road to face the Seattle Seahawks. In that game, Fuller had five receptions for 125 yards and two touchdowns as the Texans narrowly lost by a score 41–38.

Fuller finished his second professional season with 28 receptions for 423 yards and seven touchdowns to go along with nine returns for 135 yards in 10 games and starts.

==== 2018 season ====
Fuller missed the season-opening 27–20 road loss to the Patriots due to a hamstring injury. He made his season debut in the next game against the Titans as the second receiver on the Texans' depth chart. During that game, Fuller recorded eight receptions for 113 yards and a touchdown in the 20–17 road loss. In the next game against the New York Giants, he had another solid outing with five receptions for 101 yards and a touchdown during the 27–22 loss. The following week against the Indianapolis Colts, Fuller notched his third consecutive game with a touchdown, finishing the 37–34 overtime road victory with four receptions for 49 yards and the aforementioned touchdown.

During a Week 8 42–23 victory over the Miami Dolphins, Fuller had five receptions for 124 yards and a touchdown before leaving in the fourth quarter with a knee injury. It was later revealed that he tore his ACL, prematurely ending his season. Fuller finished the 2018 season with 32 receptions for 503 yards and four touchdowns in seven games and starts. Without Fuller, the Texans finished atop the AFC South with an 11–5 record and lost to the Colts in the Wild Card Round by a score of 21–7.

==== 2019 season ====
On April 26, 2019, the Texans picked up the fifth-year option on Fuller's contract.

Fuller returned from his injury in time for the season-opener against the New Orleans Saints, recording two receptions for 69 yards in the narrow 30–28 road loss. During a Week 5 53–32 victory over the Atlanta Falcons, he had 14 receptions for 217 yards and three touchdowns, marking the first time in his NFL career with over 200 receiving yards in a game. During a Week 12 20–17 victory over the Colts, Fuller had seven receptions for 140 yards.

Fuller finished the 2019 season with 49 receptions for 670 yards and three touchdowns in 11 games and starts. The Texans finished atop the AFC South with a 10–6 record and qualified for the playoffs as the #4-seed. In the Divisional Round against the Chiefs, Fuller had five receptions for 89 yards during the 51–31 road loss despite a 24–0 lead in the second quarter.

==== 2020 season ====
In the offseason, Fuller's teammate DeAndre Hopkins was traded to the Arizona Cardinals, making Fuller the Texans' number-one wide receiver.

During the season-opening 34–20 road loss to the Chiefs, Fuller had eight receptions for 112 yards. Three weeks later against the Minnesota Vikings, he recorded six receptions for 108 yards and a touchdown during the 31–23 loss. Late in the fourth quarter on a fourth down play, Fuller appeared to catch a touchdown pass to potentially tie the game that was reversed upon further review. Two weeks later against the Titans, he had six receptions for 123 yards and a touchdown in the 42–36 overtime road loss. During a narrow Week 9 27–25 road victory over the Jacksonville Jaguars, Fuller recorded five receptions for 100 yards and a 77-yard touchdown. Three weeks later against the Detroit Lions, he recorded six receptions for 171 yards and two touchdowns in the 41–25 road victory.

On November 30, Fuller was suspended six games for violating the league's policy on performance-enhancing drugs. He missed the last five games of the 2020 season and missed the first game of the 2021 NFL season. In 11 games and starts, Fuller finished the 2020 season with 53 receptions for 879 yards and eight touchdowns, which were all career highs.

=== Miami Dolphins ===
On March 20, 2021, Fuller signed a one-year, $10.6 million contract with the Dolphins. He suffered a broken thumb in Week 4 and was placed on injured reserve on October 6. Fuller was not re-signed after the season and has not played an NFL game since then.

== Career statistics ==
Legend
**Bold**	Career high

=== NFL ===
==== Regular season ====
Year	Team	Games		Receiving					Rushing					Returning					Fumbles	
Year	Team	GP	GS	Rec	Yds	Avg	Lng	TD	Att	Yds	Avg	Lng	TD	Ret	Yds	Avg	Lng	TD	Fum	Lost
2016	HOU	14	13	47	635	13.5	53	2	1	−3	−3.0	−3	0	**13**	**196**	**15.1**	**67**	**1**	**2**	0
2017	HOU	10	10	28	423	15.1	59T	7	**2**	**9**	**4.5**	**5**	0	9	135	15.0	49	0	0	0
2018	HOU	7	7	32	503	15.7	73T	4	0	0	0.0	0	0	0	0	0.0	0	0	0	0
2019	HOU	11	11	49	670	13.7	54	3	0	0	0.0	0	0	0	0	0.0	0	0	1	0
2020	HOU	11	11	**53**	**879**	**16.6**	**77T**	**8**	1	0	0.0	0	0	2	14	7.0	13	0	0	0
2021	MIA	2	0	4	26	6.5	10	0	0	0	0.0	0	0	0	0	0.0	0	0	0	0
Career		55	52	213	3,136	13.5	77T	24	4	6	1.5	5	0	24	345	14.4	67	1	3	0

==== Postseason ====
Year	Team	Games		Receiving					Rushing					Returning					Fumbles	
Year	Team	GP	GS	Rec	Yds	Avg	Lng	TD	Att	Yds	Avg	Lng	TD	Ret	Yds	Avg	Lng	TD	Fum	Lost
2016	HOU	2	2	**7**	53	7.6	19	0	0	0	0.0	0	0	**3**	**46**	**15.0**	**18**	0	0	0
2018	HOU	0	0	Did not play due to injury																
2019	HOU	1	1	5	**89**	**17.8**	**39**	0	0	0	0.0	0	0	0	0	0.0	0	0	0	0
Career		3	3	12	142	11.8	39	0	0	0	0.0	0	0	3	46	15.0	18	0	0	0

=== College ===
Season	Team	Receiving					
Season	Team	Rec	Yds	Avg	Lng	TD	Y/G
2013	Notre Dame	6	160	**26.1**	47	1	12.3
2014	Notre Dame	**76**	1,094	14.4	75	**15**	84.2
2015	Notre Dame	62	**1,258**	20.3	**81**	14	**96.8**
Career		144	2,512	17.4	81	30	64.4
