= C. J. Prosise =

American football player (born 1994)

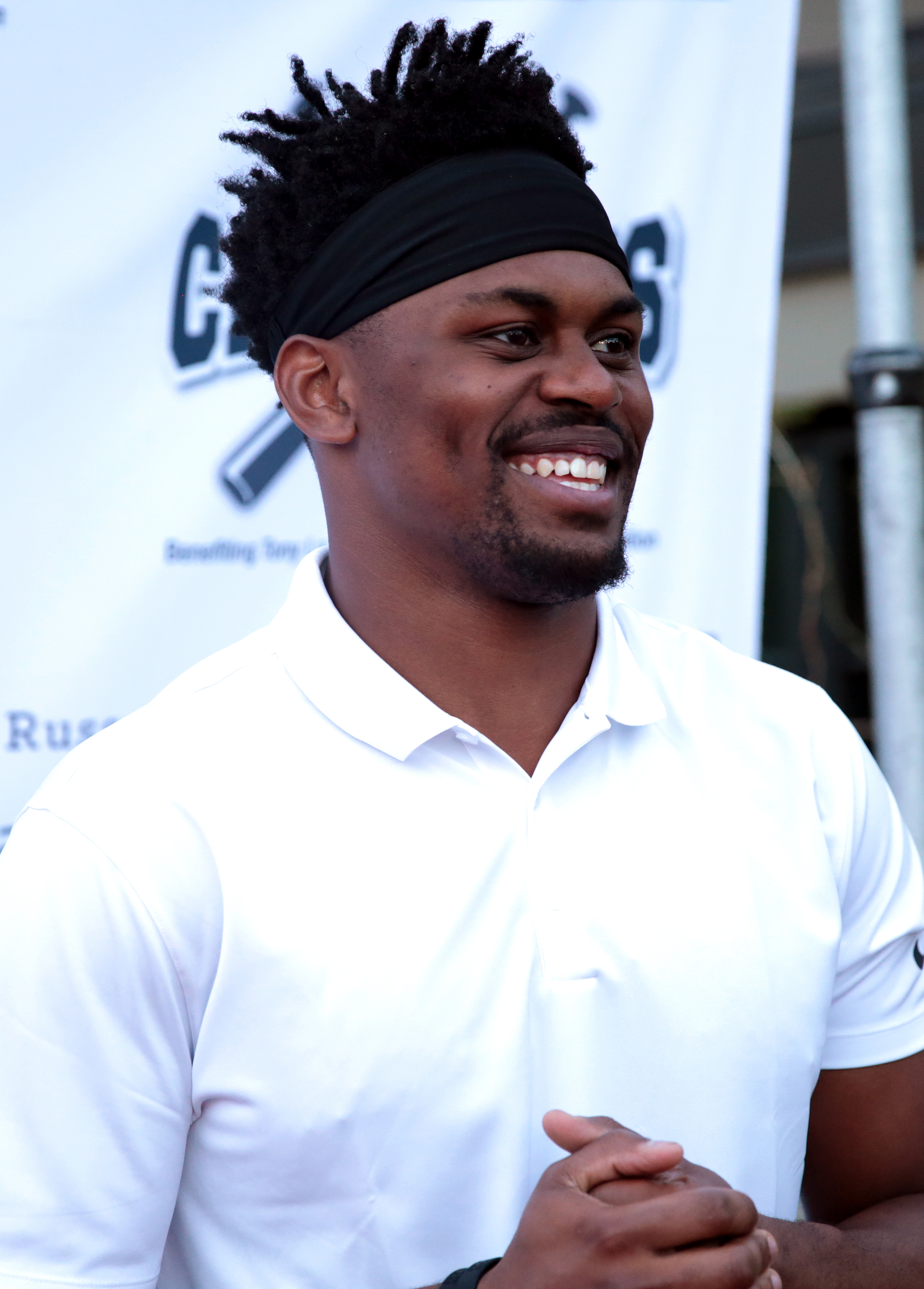
- Prosise in 2017

No. 22, 24
- Position: Running back

Personal information
- Born: May 20, 1994 (age 32); Petersburg, Virginia, U.S.
- Listed height: 6 ft 1 in (1.85 m)
- Listed weight: 225 lb (102 kg)

Career information
- High school: Woodberry Forest School (Woodberry Forest, Virginia)
- College: Notre Dame (2012–2015)
- NFL draft: 2016: 3rd round, 90th overall pick

Career history
- Seattle Seahawks (2016–2019); Houston Texans (2020); Tampa Bay Buccaneers (2020–2021)*
- * Offseason or practice squad member only

Career NFL statistics
- Rushing yards: 283
- Rushing touchdowns: 2
- Receptions: 41
- Receiving yards: 411
- Receiving touchdowns: 1
- Stats at Pro Football Reference

Calvin "C. J." Prosise Jr. (born May 20, 1994) is an American former professional football player who was a running back in the National Football League (NFL). He was selected by the Seattle Seahawks in the third round of the 2016 NFL draft. He played college football for the Notre Dame Fighting Irish.

== Early life ==
Prosise attended Woodberry Forest School in Madison County, Virginia. He played safety and wide receiver in high school. He was rated by Rivals.com as a three-star recruit at safety. He committed to the University of Notre Dame to play college football over offers from Penn State, North Carolina, Vanderbilt, Virginia Tech, among others.

College recruiting
Name	Hometown	School	Height	Weight	Commit date
C.J. Prosise; Safety	Petersburg, Virginia	Madison (VA) Woodberry	6 ft 2 in (1.88 m)	190 lb (86 kg)	May 26, 2011
C.J. Prosise; Safety	Recruit ratings: Scout: Rivals: (79)				
Overall recruit ranking: Scout: 21 (S), 276 (national) ESPN: 22 (S)
Note: In many cases, Scout, Rivals, 247Sports, On3, and ESPN may conflict in their listings of height and weight.; In these cases, the average was taken. ESPN grades are on a 100-point scale.; Sources: "Notre Dame Football Commitment List". Rivals.; "Notre Dame College Football Recruiting Commits". Scout.; "ESPN". ESPN.; "Scout.com Team Recruiting Rankings". Scout.; "2012 Team Ranking". Rivals.com.

== College career ==
After redshirting his first year at Notre Dame in 2012, Prosise played in all 13 games as a wide receiver and on special teams his redshirt freshman year in 2013. For the season, he had seven receptions for 72 yards. As a sophomore in 2014, he played in all 13 games and made six starts. He had 29 receptions for 516 yards and two touchdowns and led the team in special teams tackles with 11. Prior to his junior year in 2015, Prosise was moved to running back. After a season-ending injury to Tarean Folston versus Texas, Prosise became the starter. In his first start against Virginia, he rushed for 155 yards with a touchdown. In his second start against Georgia Tech, he rushed for 198 yards and three touchdowns, including a 91-yard rushing touchdown which was the longest in Notre Dame Stadium history. Prosise continued adding big performances throughout the season. He recorded 100 receiving yards at Clemson, rushed for 129 yards (6.1 avg) and three touchdowns against Navy, and rushed for 143 yards and two touchdowns against USC, before being slowed down by injury, limited him to only 13 carries over Notre Dame's last five games. He finished the season rushing for 1,032 yards on 156 carries (6.6 avg) and 11 touchdowns, and 28 receptions for 308 yards and one touchdown.

Following Notre Dame's loss against Ohio State in the Fiesta Bowl, Prosise announced he would forego his remaining eligibility and enter the 2016 NFL draft.

== Professional career ==
Pre-draft measurables
Height	Weight	Arm length	Hand span	40-yard dash	10-yard split	20-yard split	20-yard shuttle	Three-cone drill	Vertical jump	Broad jump
6 ft 0 1/2 in (1.84 m)	220 lb (100 kg)	32 1/8 in (0.82 m)	8 1/2 in (0.22 m)	4.48 s	1.53 s	2.64 s	4.42 s	7.19 s	35.5 in (0.90 m)	10 ft 1 in (3.07 m)
All values from NFL Combine and Pro Day

=== Seattle Seahawks ===
Prosise was selected by the Seattle Seahawks in the third round (90th overall) of the 2016 NFL Draft. On May 6, 2016, the Seahawks signed Prosise to a four-year, $3.11 million contract with a signing bonus of $692,464.

Prosise started his first game against the New England Patriots in Week 10, where he carried the ball 17 times for 66 yards and added 87 receiving yards in the win. Prosise also started the Week 11 game against the Philadelphia Eagles and scored his first career touchdown, a 72-yard run, but suffered a fractured scapula that ended his rookie season.

On November 14, 2017, Prosise was placed on injured reserve with an ankle injury. He finished his second season with 23 rushing yards, and 6 receptions for 87 yards during his injury-riddled season.

In 2018, Prosise played in five games before being placed on injured reserve with abdomen, groin, and hip-flexor injuries.

In 2019, Prosise played in nine games, recording 72 rushing yards and a touchdown along with 10 receptions for 76 yards. He suffered a broken arm in Week 16 and was placed on injured reserve on December 24, 2019.

After becoming a free agent in March 2020, Prosise had a tryout with the Detroit Lions on August 13, 2020, and with the Chicago Bears on August 17.

=== Houston Texans ===
On September 7, 2020, Prosise was signed to the practice squad of the Houston Texans practice squad. He was elevated to the active roster on September 19 for the team's week 2 game against the Baltimore Ravens, and reverted to the practice squad after the game. He was elevated again on September 26 for the week 3 game against the Pittsburgh Steelers, and reverted to the practice squad again after the game. He was promoted to the active roster on September 28. He was released on October 26 and re-signed to the practice squad the next day. He was signed to the active roster on November 14. On December 28, Prosise was waived by the Texans.

=== Tampa Bay Buccaneers ===
On January 6, 2021, Prosise signed with the practice squad of the Tampa Bay Buccaneers. He was released by Tampa Bay on January 29. On February 12, Prosise re-signed with the Buccaneers. He was released again on August 31.

On December 21, 2021, the Atlanta Falcons hosted Prosise for a workout.
