= Asmar Bilal =

American football player (born 1997)

Profile
- Position: Linebacker

Personal information
- Born: April 12, 1997 (age 29); Indianapolis, Indiana, U.S.
- Listed height: 6 ft 2 in (1.88 m)
- Listed weight: 230 lb (104 kg)

Career information
- High school: Ben Davis (Indianapolis)
- College: Notre Dame (2015–2019)
- NFL draft: 2020: undrafted

Career history
- Los Angeles Chargers (2020); Las Vegas Raiders (2021)*
- * Offseason or practice squad member only
- Stats at Pro Football Reference

Asmar Bilal (born April 12, 1997) is an American football linebacker.

== Early life ==
Bilal played high school football at Ben Davis High School in Indianapolis. During his senior year, he earned 6A All-State honors and helped lead his team to a state championship while recording 155 tackles, 6 tackles for loss, 5 sacks, and an interception. Bilal was also a participant in the U.S. Army All-American Game and was rated by ESPN as the 23rd best outside linebacker in the country.

== College career ==
Bilal played college football at Notre Dame. During his senior season, he had 79 total tackles with 10 for loss. He finished his career with 45 game appearances and 174 total tackles. In 2019, he was named a Pro Football Focus All-American honorable mention.

== Professional career ==
=== Los Angeles Chargers ===
Bilal went undrafted in the 2020 NFL draft. He signed with the Los Angeles Chargers shortly after the draft. He was waived during final roster cuts on September 5, 2020, and signed to the practice squad the next day. He was promoted to the Chargers active roster on September 15 after an injury to starting linebacker Drue Tranquill, who started over Bilal at linebacker at Notre Dame during their time as teammates. He was placed on injured reserve on September 26, 2020. He was activated on December 5, 2020. He was waived on December 12, 2020.

=== Las Vegas Raiders ===
On January 27, 2021, Bilal signed a reserve/future contract with the Las Vegas Raiders. He was waived on August 31, 2021. He was re-signed to the practice squad on December 29, 2021. He was released on January 11, 2022.
