= Sheldon Day =

American football player (born 1994)

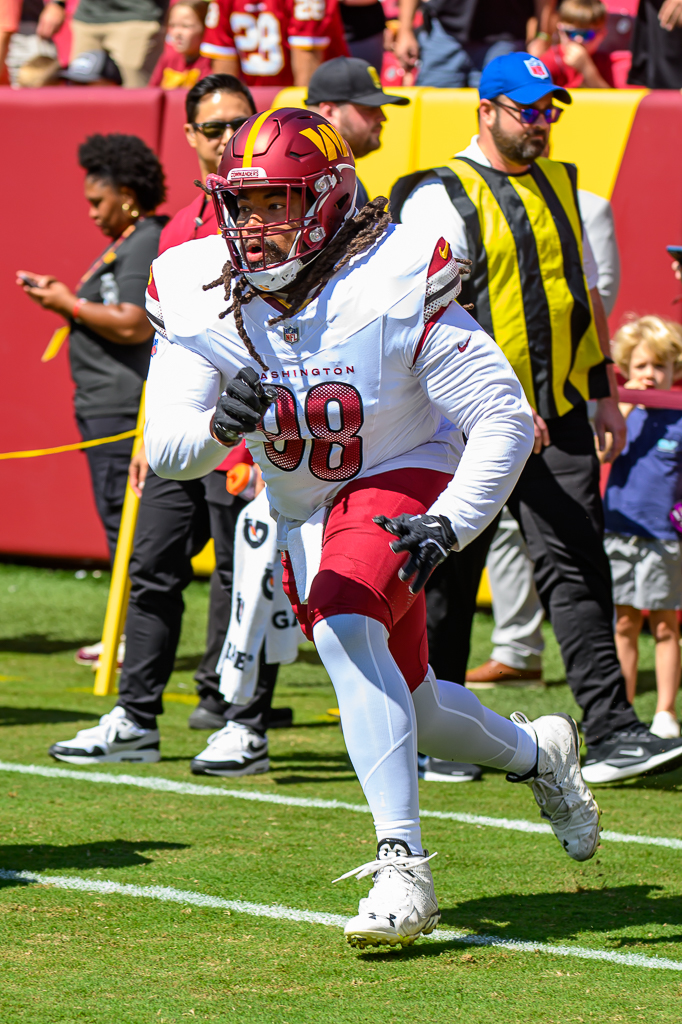
- Day with the Washington Commanders in 2025

Profile
- Position: Defensive tackle

Personal information
- Born: July 1, 1994 (age 32); Indianapolis, Indiana, U.S.
- Listed height: 6 ft 1 in (1.85 m)
- Listed weight: 294 lb (133 kg)

Career information
- High school: Warren Central (Indianapolis)
- College: Notre Dame (2012–2015)
- NFL draft: 2016: 4th round, 103rd overall pick

Career history
- Jacksonville Jaguars (2016–2017); San Francisco 49ers (2017–2019); Indianapolis Colts (2020); Cleveland Browns (2020–2021); Minnesota Vikings (2022–2023); Washington Commanders (2024–2025)

Awards and highlights
- Second-team All-American (2015)

Career NFL statistics as of 2025
- Total tackles: 121
- Sacks: 7
- Fumble recoveries: 1
- Pass deflections: 8
- Stats at Pro Football Reference

Sheldon Day (born July 1, 1994) is an American professional football defensive tackle. He played college football for the Notre Dame Fighting Irish and was selected by the Jacksonville Jaguars in the fourth round of the 2016 NFL draft. Day has also played for the San Francisco 49ers, Indianapolis Colts, Cleveland Browns, Minnesota Vikings, and Washington Commanders.

== Early life ==
Day attended Warren Central High School in Indianapolis, Indiana.

Considered a four-star recruit by Rivals.com, he was rated as the 18th best defensive tackle prospect of his class. On August 4, 2011, he committed to play college football at the University of Notre Dame.

College recruiting
Name	Hometown	School	Height	Weight	Commit date
Sheldon Day; DT	Indianapolis, Indiana	Indianapolis (IN) Warren Central	6 ft 2 in (1.88 m)	280 lb (130 kg)	Aug 3, 2011
Sheldon Day; DT	Recruit ratings: Scout: Rivals: (80)				
Overall recruit ranking: Scout: 6 (DT), 50 (national) Rivals: 244 (national) ESPN: 14 (DT), 12 (regional), 2 (IN)
Note: In many cases, Scout, Rivals, 247Sports, On3, and ESPN may conflict in their listings of height and weight.; In these cases, the average was taken. ESPN grades are on a 100-point scale.; Sources: "Notre Dame Football Commitment List". Rivals.; "Notre Dame College Football Recruiting Commits". Scout.; "ESPN". ESPN.; "Scout.com Team Recruiting Rankings". Scout.; "2012 Team Ranking". Rivals.com.

== College career ==
As a true freshman at Notre Dame in 2012, Day appeared in all 13 games and had 23 tackles and two sacks. As a sophomore, he played in 11 games and made eight starts. He recorded 33 tackles and a half sack. As an 11-game starter his junior year, Day had 40 tackles and one sack. Following the end of the season, Day announced that he would return for his senior season, forgoing the 2015 NFL draft. In his senior season, starting all 13 games, Day set a career high in tackles (45), tackles for loss (15.5) and sacks (4), earning himself second-team All-American honors by the Associated Press.

== Professional career ==
Pre-draft measurables
Height	Weight	Arm length	Hand span	40-yard dash	10-yard split	20-yard split	20-yard shuttle	Three-cone drill	Vertical jump	Broad jump	Bench press
6 ft 0 5/8 in (1.84 m)	293 lb (133 kg)	32 5/8 in (0.83 m)	9 5/8 in (0.24 m)	5.07 s	1.69 s	2.88 s	4.50 s	7.44 s	30 in (0.76 m)	8 ft 6 in (2.59 m)	21 reps
All values from NFL Combine

=== Jacksonville Jaguars ===
Day was selected by the Jacksonville Jaguars in the fourth round (103rd overall) of the 2016 NFL draft.

On November 18, 2017, Day was waived by the Jaguars.

=== San Francisco 49ers ===
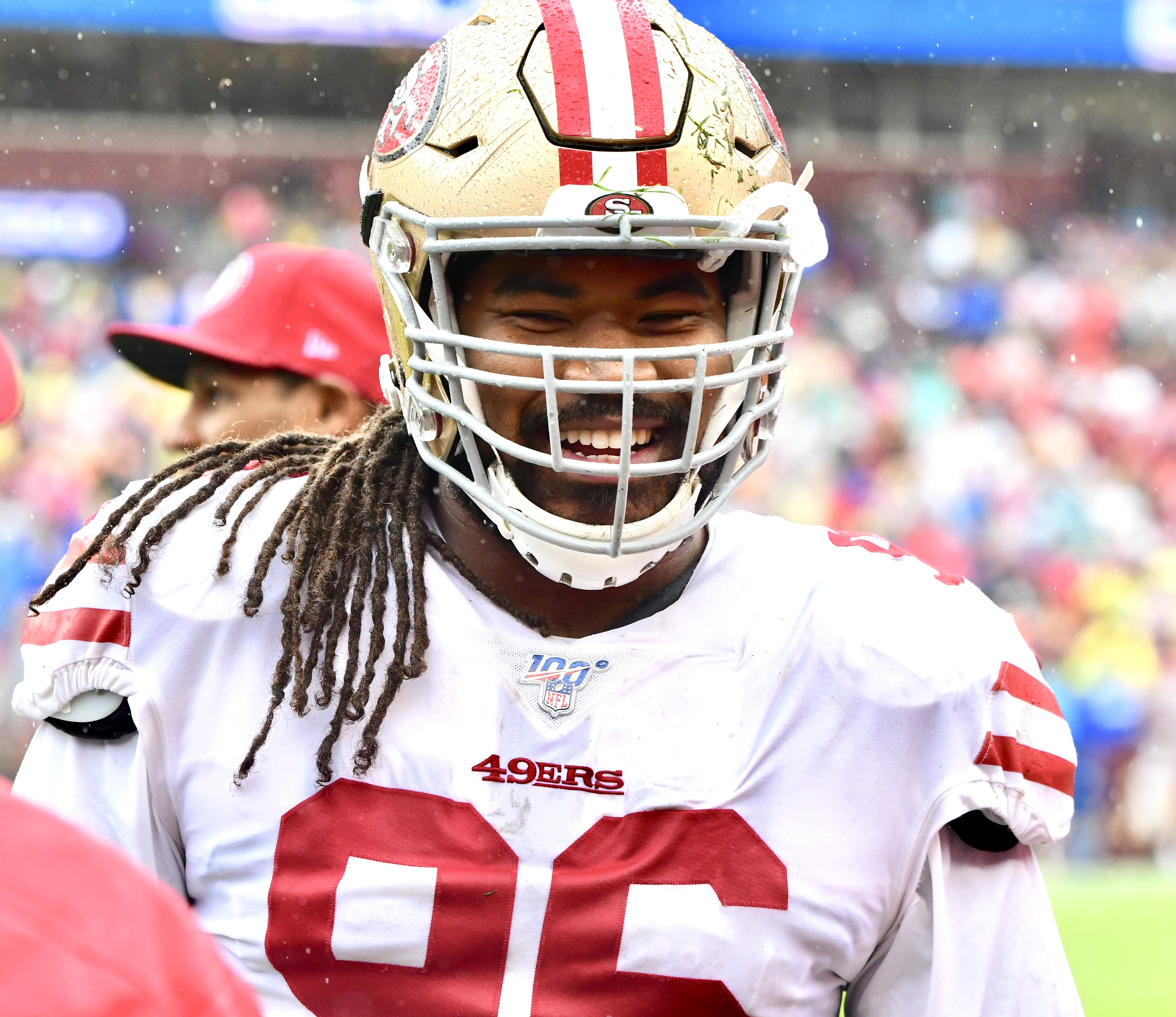
Day with the San Francisco 49ers in 2019

On November 20, 2017, Day was claimed off waivers by the San Francisco 49ers. Familiar to defensive coordinator Robert Saleh, Day was immediately a part of the defensive line rotation. He served as a reserve and played in six games, netting 12 solo tackles, four assisted tackles, and a sack. Day reached Super Bowl LIV with the 49ers, but lost 31–20 to the Kansas City Chiefs.

=== Indianapolis Colts ===
On March 26, 2020, Day signed a one-year contract with the Indianapolis Colts. He was placed on injured reserve on September 6. Day was designated to return from injured reserve on September 30, and began practicing with the team again. He was activated on October 17. Day was waived by the Colts on November 17.

=== Cleveland Browns ===
On December 30, 2020, Day was signed to the practice squad of the Cleveland Browns. His practice squad contract with the team expired after the season on January 25, 2021.

Day re-signed with the Browns on April 14, 2021. The Browns terminated his contract on August 31. Day was re-signed to the Browns' practice squad the next day. Day was elevated to the Browns' active roster on October 16, and reverted to the practice squad two days later. Day was signed to the Browns' active roster on November 9.

On April 18, 2022, Day re-signed with the Browns. The Browns terminated his contract on August 16.

=== Minnesota Vikings ===
On December 14, 2022, Day was signed to the Minnesota Vikings practice squad. He was released on January 7, 2023. He signed a reserve/futures contract with the team on January 30. Day was released on August 29, and signed to the practice squad the next day. He was released on November 8 and re-signed three days later. Day was signed to the active roster on November 21.

=== Washington Commanders ===
Day signed with the Washington Commanders' practice squad on August 28, 2024. He was signed to the active roster on October 16.

On March 17, 2025, Day re-signed with the Commanders on a one-year contract. He was waived on August 26, 2025, and signed with their practice squad the following day. On November 5, the Commanders signed Day to their active roster.

== NFL career statistics ==
Legend
**Bold**	Career high

=== Regular season ===
Year	Team	Games		Tackles					Interceptions						Fumbles				
Year	Team	GP	GS	Cmb	Solo	Ast	Sck	TFL	Int	Yds	Avg	Lng	TD	PD	FF	Fum	FR	Yds	TD
2016	JAX	16	0	8	6	2	1.0	**4**	0	0	0.0	0	0	0	0	0	0	0	0
2017	JAX	6	0	3	1	2	1.0	1	0	0	0.0	0	0	1	0	0	0	0	0
2017	SF	6	0	16	**12**	4	1.0	**4**	0	0	0.0	0	0	1	0	0	0	0	0
2018	SF	12	0	11	9	2	**2.0**	2	0	0	0.0	0	0	**2**	0	0	0	0	0
2019	SF	16	2	15	10	5	1.0	3	0	0	0.0	0	0	0	0	0	0	0	0
2020	IND	4	0	2	1	1	0.0	0	0	0	0.0	0	0	1	0	0	0	0	0
2021	CLE	7	1	21	7	**14**	1.0	0	0	0	0.0	0	0	**2**	0	0	0	0	0
2023	MIN	6	1	8	3	5	0.0	1	0	0	0.0	0	0	0	0	0	**1**	**5**	0
2024	WAS	12	0	**24**	**12**	12	0.0	2	0	0	0.0	0	0	1	0	0	0	0	0
2025	WAS	10	0	13	6	7	0.0	0	0	0	0.0	0	0	0	0	0	0	0	0
Career		95	4	121	67	54	7.0	17	0	0	0.0	0	0	8	0	0	1	5	0

=== Postseason ===
Year	Team	Games		Tackles					Interceptions						Fumbles				
Year	Team	GP	GS	Cmb	Solo	Ast	Sck	TFL	Int	Yds	Avg	Lng	TD	PD	FF	Fum	FR	Yds	TD
2019	SF	3	3	**3**	**2**	**1**	0.0	**1**	0	0	0.0	0	0	0	0	0	0	0	0
2024	WAS	3	0	1	0	**1**	0.0	0	0	0	0.0	0	0	0	0	0	0	0	0
Career		6	3	4	2	2	0.0	1	0	0	0.0	0	0	0	0	0	0	0	0
