= Warren Central High School (Indiana) =

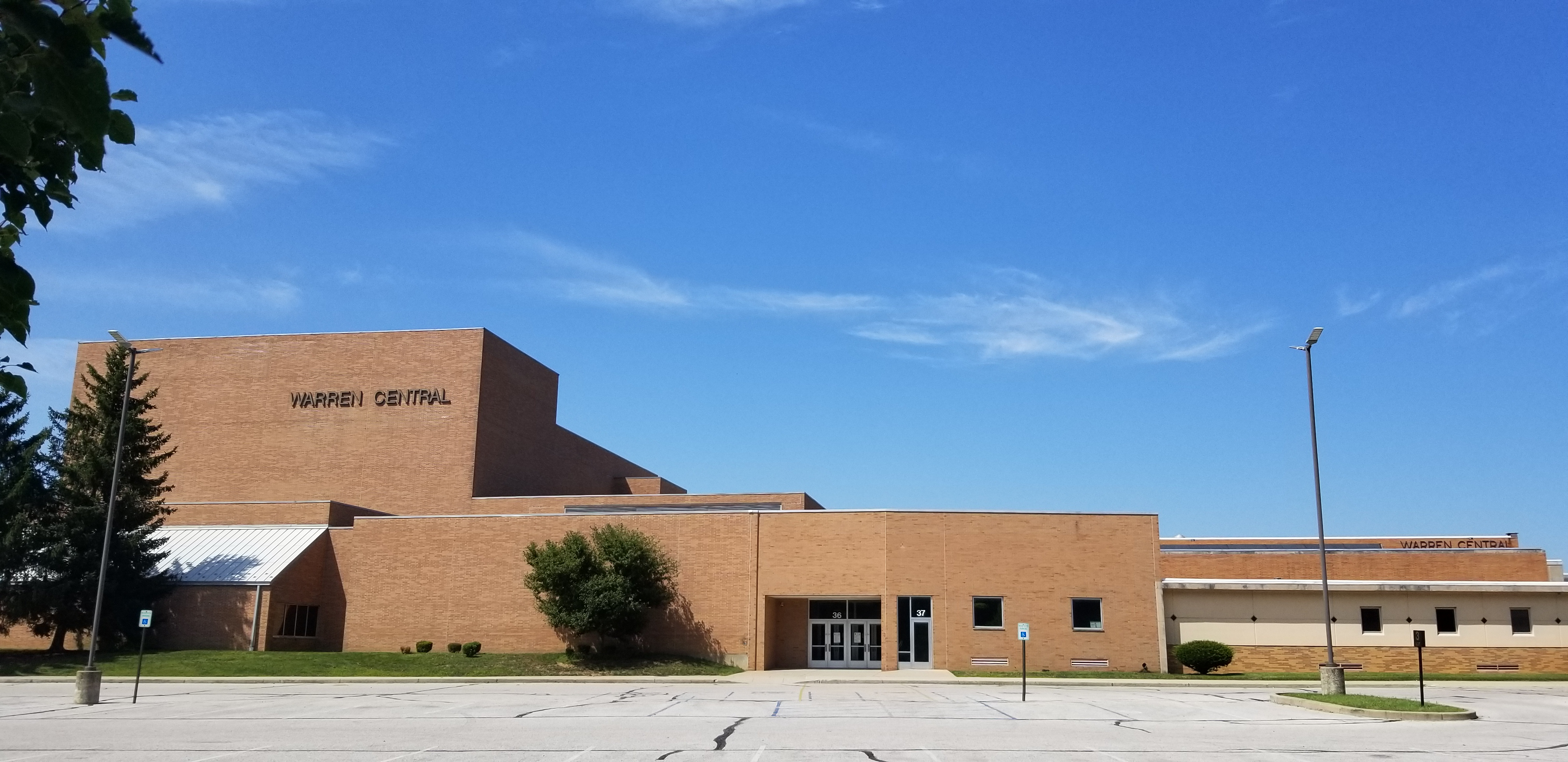

Location
- 9500 East 16th Street; Indianapolis, Marion County, Indiana 46229; United States; 39.791167°N 86.000264°W

Information
- Type: Public high school
- Motto: "Wisdom, Courage, Honor, Service"
- Established: 1924
- School district: Metropolitan School District of Warren Township
- Principal: Masimba Taylor
- Teaching staff: 187.86 (FTE)
- Grades: 9–12
- Enrollment: 3,398 (2023–2024)
- Student to teacher ratio: 18.09
- Colors: Black and gold
- Athletics conference: Metropolitan Interscholastic Conference
- Team name: Warriors
- Newspaper: The OWL
- Yearbook: Wigwam (Volumes 1-85), Halcyon (Volumes 86-Present)
- Website: https://wchs.warren.k12.in.us/

Warren Central High School, also known as Warren, WC, or WCHS, is a public high school located in Warren Township on the far east side of Indianapolis, Indiana. It is the only high school in Warren Township with an enrollment of 3,736 students, in grades 9–12, as of the 2016–2017 school year. Warren Central is known as "The Pride of the Eastside". Its school colors are Black and Vegas Gold and the nickname is the Warriors. The school fight song is Rah, Rah For Warren. The original Warren Central opened on January 12, 1925, at the corner of 10th Street and Post Road on the far east side of Indianapolis. It was a consolidation of the Cumberland and Shadeland schools which both had high schools that were too small for the growing township population. Warren Central was built to house grades 7 to 12 and to give the students a city quality education in a farm community. By the late 1950s, the population of Warren Township had once again outgrown its high school and, on September 6, 1960, a new Warren Central opened at its present location off of 9500 East 16th Street. In 1976, the Walker Career Center opened on the property of the high school.

== Athletics ==
The school is best known for athletic success, competing as a member of the nationally recognized Metropolitan Interscholastic Conference. Warren Central has a total of 28 State Championship titles since winning its first title in 1980. State championships include Girls Basketball (1), Boys Basketball (1), Boys Cross Country (2), Boys Track (4), Girls Track (5), Boys Golf (1), Boys Gymnastics (2), Softball (1), Wrestling (2), and Football (9).

Warren Central was ranked the third-best athletic program in the US and first among public schools by Sports Illustrated in 2007.

== Notable alumni ==
- Ryan Murphy - American television writer, director, and producer; creator of American Horror Story, Nip/Tuck and Glee.
- Jamie Asher - former NFL tight end for the Washington Redskins and Philadelphia Eagles
- David Bell - current wide receiver for the Cleveland Browns
- Shakir Bell - former CFL running back for the Edmonton Eskimos
- Justin Beriault - former NFL safety for the Dallas Cowboys
- JuJu Brents - current cornerback for the Miami Dolphins
- Sheldon Day - NFL defensive tackle, free agent.
- Darren Evans - former NFL running back for the Indianapolis Colts and Tennessee Titans
- Jeff George - former NFL quarterback for the Indianapolis Colts (1990–1993), Atlanta Falcons (1994–1996), Oakland Raiders (1997–1998), Minnesota Vikings (1999), Washington Redskins (2000–2001), Seattle Seahawks (2002) and Chicago Bears (2004)
- Greg Graham - former NBA shooting guard for the Philadelphia 76ers, New Jersey Nets, Seattle SuperSonics and Cleveland Cavaliers; Graham also played for the Continental Basketball League and the Swedish Basketball League
- Jewel Hampton - former running back for the CFL's Montreal Alouettes and the NFL's San Francisco 49ers
- Aubrey Herring - track and field athlete, Indiana State
- Robert M. Jacobson - current medical director of the Population Health Science Program of the Robert D. and Patricia E. Kern Center for the Science of Health Care Delivery; former chair of Pediatric and Adolescent Medicine at the Mayo Clinic
- Andrew McDonald - former NFL offensive tackle for the Seattle Seahawks
- Candyce McGrone - USA Track & Field athlete
- Ryan Murphy - film and television screenwriter, director and producer; creator of the TV series Glee, American Horror Story and Nip/Tuck
- Jane Pauley - television journalist and host, best known for her time as co-host of the Today show and Dateline NBC
- Adrien Robinson - former NFL tight end for the New York Jets and the New York Giants
- Justin Smith - former NFL linebacker for the Tampa Bay Buccaneers, St. Louis Rams, Arizona Cardinals and Carolina Panthers
- Jason Whitlock - sportswriter and personality for Fox Sports 1
- Deyshawn Bond - former NFL guard for the Indianapolis Colts
- Anthony Winbush - former NFL defensive end for the Indianapolis Colts

== In popular culture ==
Despite popular opinion, the lyrics of Elton John Band's 1975 hit Philadelphia Freedom (song), written by Bernie Taupin, do not refer to "Shine a light through the Warren Central High" but instead "Shine a light through the eyes of the ones left behind." This might be considered a Mondegreen.

== See also ==
- Metropolitan Interscholastic Conference
- List of schools in Indianapolis
- List of high schools in Indiana
