= 2016 Fiesta Bowl (January) =

2016 BattleFrog Fiesta Bowl
- CFP New Year’s Six; 45th Fiesta Bowl
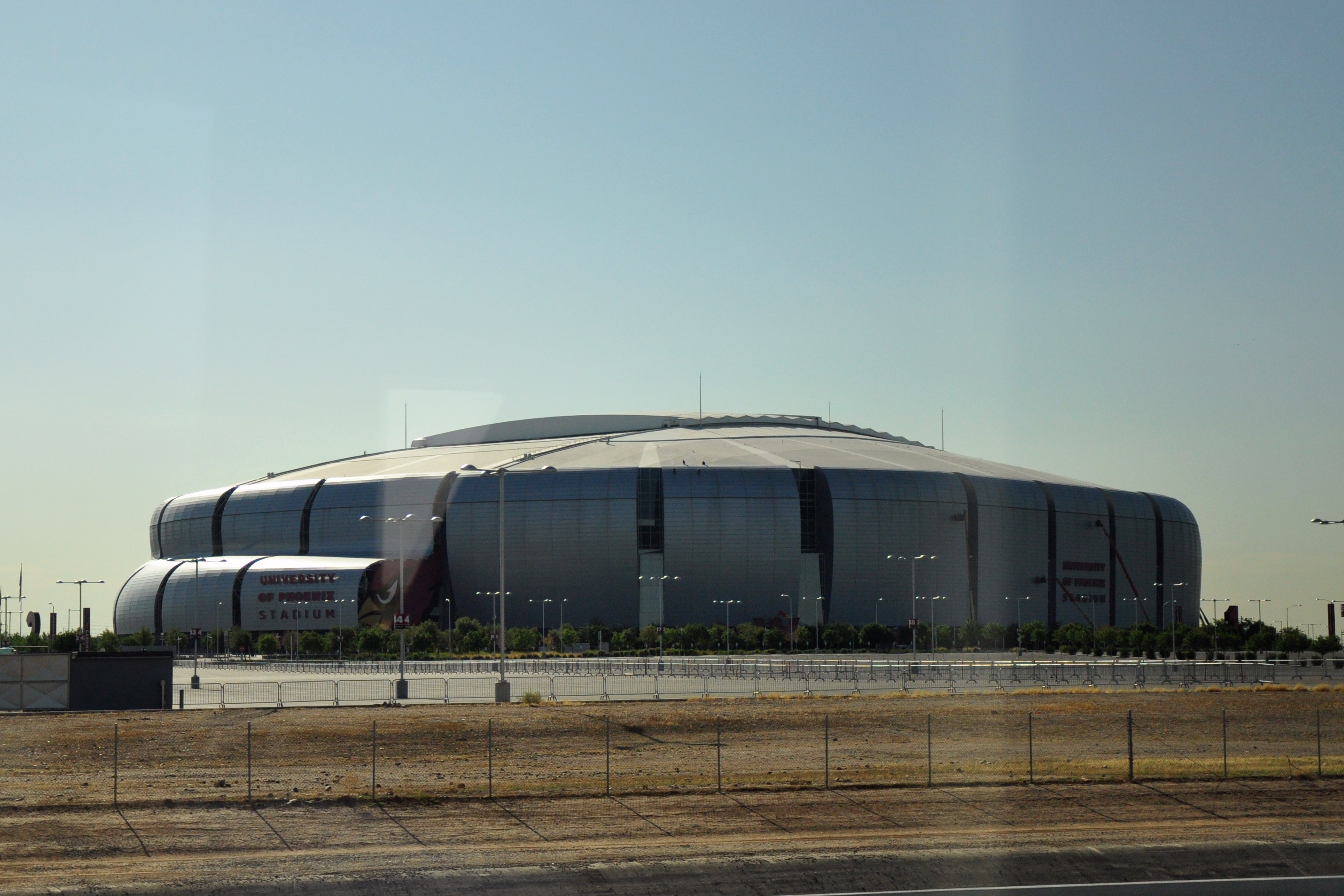
- University of Phoenix Stadium in Glendale, Arizona, hosted the Fiesta Bowl.
Notre Dame Fighting Irish	Ohio State Buckeyes
(10–2)	(11–1)
Independent	Big Ten
28	44
Head coach: Brian Kelly	Head coach: Urban Meyer
AP / Coaches / CFP; 8 / 9 / 8	AP / Coaches / CFP; 7 / 5 / 7
	1	2	3	4	Total
Notre Dame	0	14	7	7	28
Ohio State	14	14	7	9	44
- Date: January 1, 2016
- Season: 2015
- Stadium: University of Phoenix Stadium
- Location: Glendale, Arizona
- MVP: J. T. Barrett & Eli Apple
- Favorite: Ohio State by 3.5
- Referee: Hubert Owens (SEC)
- Halftime show: OSU & ND Bands
- Attendance: 71,123
- Payout: US$24 million (2014)

United States TV coverage
- Network: ESPN, ESPN Deportes
- Announcers: Sean McDonough, Chris Spielman, & Todd McShay (ESPN); Adam Amin, Kelly Stouffer, & Olivia Harlan (ESPN Radio)

The 2016 Fiesta Bowl was a college football bowl game that was played on January 1, 2016 at University of Phoenix Stadium in Glendale, Arizona. The 44th Fiesta Bowl was one of the New Year's Bowls. It was one of the 2015–16 bowl games that concluded the 2015 FBS football season.

The game was televised on ESPN and ESPN Deportes, and broadcast on ESPN Radio and XM Satellite Radio, with the kickoff time set for 1:00 p.m. ET (11 a.m. MT). Sponsored by obstacle racing series BattleFrog, it was officially known as the BattleFrog Fiesta Bowl.

Coincidentally, it took place 10 years after the 2006 Fiesta Bowl, that was also played by Ohio State and Notre Dame. That was also the last time Notre Dame participated in the Fiesta Bowl.

Ohio State beat Notre Dame, 44–28.

== Teams ==
The participants for the game were determined by the College Football Playoff selection committee, and consisted of at-large selections and/or the highest ranked team from the "Group of Five" conferences. The two participants were the #8 Notre Dame Fighting Irish (10–2) vs. the #7 Ohio State Buckeyes (11–1).

== Game summary ==
=== Scoring summary ===
Scoring summary

Quarter	Time	Drive			Team	Scoring information	Score	
Quarter	Time	Plays	Yards	TOP	Team	Scoring information	ND	OSU
1	9:53	9	80	3:01	OSU	Ezekiel Elliott 2-yard touchdown run, Sean Nuernberger kick good	0	7
1	7:41	3	43	0:45	OSU	Michael Thomas 15-yard touchdown reception from J. T. Barrett, Sean Nuernberger kick good	0	14
2	7:34	13	70	5:38	ND	Josh Adams 3-yard touchdown run, Justin Yoon kick good	7	14
2	9:53	11	62	2:39	OSU	Ezekiel Elliott 1-yard touchdown run, Sean Nuernberger kick good	7	21
2	1:48	6	63	2:04	OSU	Ezekiel Elliott 1-yard touchdown run, Sean Nuernberger kick good	7	28
2	0:29	9	75	1:19	ND	DeShone Kizer 1-yard touchdown run, Justin Yoon kick good	14	28
3	8:58	7	58	2:54	ND	Chris Brown 4-yard touchdown reception from DeShone Kizer, Justin Yoon kick good	21	28
3	6:37	6	75	2:21	OSU	Ezekiel Elliott 47-yard touchdown run, Sean Nuernberger kick good	21	35
4	12:10	10	44	4:14	OSU	37-yard field goal by Sean Nuernberger	21	38
4	11:27	2	83	0:43	ND	Will Fuller 81-yard touchdown reception from DeShone Kizer, Justin Yoon kick good	28	38
4	6:09	13	42	5:18	OSU	38-yard field goal by Sean Nuernberger	28	41
4	2:42	4	5	1:36	OSU	35-yard field goal by Sean Nuernberger	28	44
"TOP" = time of possession. For other American football terms, see Glossary of American football.							28	44

=== Statistics ===
Statistics	ND	OSU
First downs	24	27
Total offense, plays – yards	70–405	85–496
Rushes-yards (net)	32–121	54–285
Passing yards (net)	284	211
Passes, Comp-Att-Int	22–38–1	19–31–1
Time of Possession	27:15	32:45
