= Ben Koyack =

American football player (born 1993)

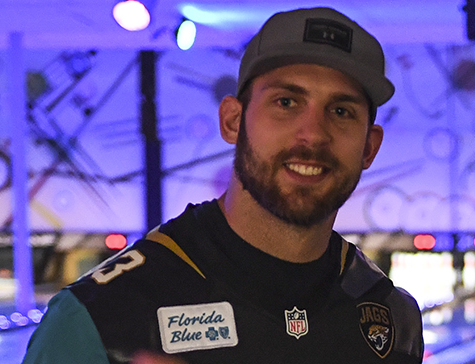
- Koyack with the Jacksonville Jaguars in 2017

No. 83
- Position: Tight end

Personal information
- Born: April 9, 1993 (age 33); Oil City, Pennsylvania, U.S.
- Listed height: 6 ft 5 in (1.96 m)
- Listed weight: 258 lb (117 kg)

Career information
- High school: Oil City
- College: Notre Dame (2011–2014)
- NFL draft: 2015: 7th round, 229th overall pick

Career history
- Jacksonville Jaguars (2015–2019)

Career NFL statistics
- Receptions: 25
- Receiving yards: 208
- Receiving touchdowns: 1
- Stats at Pro Football Reference

Benjamin Koyack (KOY-ack; born April 9, 1993) is an American former professional football player who was a tight end in the National Football League (NFL). He was selected by the Jacksonville Jaguars in the seventh round of the 2015 NFL draft. He played college football for the Notre Dame Fighting Irish.

== Early life ==
Koyack attended Oil City High School in Oil City, Pennsylvania. He played football and baseball. In football, he played numerous positions, including tight end, quarterback, wide receiver, defensive end, and linebacker. He finished his career with a PIAA District 10 record 152 receptions for 2,591 yards. He was selected to play in the 2011 Under Armour All-America Game in St. Petersburg, Florida.

Koyack was also a standout track & field athlete. He captured the state championship in the javelin with a throw of 192 ft 11 in (58.80 m). He also qualified for the district meet competing as a sprinter, posting bests of 11.49 seconds in the 100 meters and 24.05 seconds in the 200 meters.

Koyack was ranked by 247Sports as the fourth best tight end in his class. He committed to the University of Notre Dame in April 2010 to play college football.

== College career ==
Koyack attended and played college football at Notre Dame from 2011 to 2014. As a freshman in 2011, he played in 12 games with one start. He had one reception for five yards, which came against the Pitt Panthers, during the season. As a sophomore in 2012, he again played in 12 games with one start. He finished the year with three receptions for 39 yards. Koyack played in 13 games with five starts as a junior in 2013, finishing with 10 receptions for 171 yards and three touchdowns. Koyack entered his senior season in 2014 as the starter. During the game against Stanford, he caught a game-winning 22-yard touchdown from quarterback Everett Golson on fourth down. He finished his senior season with 30 receptions for 317 yards and two touchdowns.

== Professional career ==
=== Pre-draft ===
On December 22, 2014, it was announced that Koyack had accepted his invitation to play in the 2015 Senior Bowl. Koyack impressed team representatives and scouts in practice while working with Tennessee Titans tight ends coach Mike Mularkey. On January 24, 2015, Koyack played in the Senior Bowl for Tennessee Titan's head coach Ken Whisenhunt's North team and caught two passes for 19-yards and a touchdown. He caught a 10-yard touchdown reception on pass from Oregon State quarterback Sean Mannion in the second quarter of the North's 34–13 victory over the South. He was one of 19 collegiate tight ends to attend the NFL Scouting Combine in Indianapolis, Indiana. Koyack opted to not perform at the combine and only meet with representatives from NFL teams. On March 31, 2015, Koyack attended Notre Dame's pro day along with 10 other teammates. Team representatives and scouts attended the pro day as he ran all of the combine drills. His time of 4.79s in the 40-yard dash would've tied for fourth among all tight ends at the combine. His overall performance in combine drills was mediocre as his vertical jump ranked last of his position group and his bench press would've ranked ninth. At the conclusion of the pre-draft process, Koyack was projected to be a fourth or fifth-round pick by NFL experts and scouts. He was ranked as the seventh best tight end prospect by NFLDraftScout.com.

Pre-draft measurables
Height	Weight	Arm length	Hand span	40-yard dash	10-yard split	20-yard split	20-yard shuttle	Three-cone drill	Vertical jump	Broad jump	Bench press
6 ft 4 7/8 in (1.95 m)	255 lb (116 kg)	32 5/8 in (0.83 m)	10 3/4 in (0.27 m)	4.79 s	1.69 s	2.78 s	4.52 s	7.32 s	30 in (0.76 m)	9 ft 8 in (2.95 m)	16 reps
All values from Notre Dame's Pro Day

=== 2015 ===
The Jacksonville Jaguars selected Koyack in the seventh round (229th overall) of the 2015 NFL draft. He was the 14th tight end selected and the only player drafted from Notre Dame in 2015. On May 14, 2015, the Jaguars signed Koyack to a four-year $2.35 million contract that includes a signing bonus of $69,300.

Throughout training camp, he competed against Clay Harbor, Nic Jacobs, and Connor Hamlett for a roster spot. On September 4, 2015, he was waived as a part of the Jaguars final roster cuts. The Jaguars opted to have only four tight ends on their active roster, including Marcedes Lewis, Julius Thomas, Nic Jacobs, and Clay Harbor. After clearing waivers, Koyack was signed to the Jaguars' practice squad on September 6, 2015. He spent his entire rookie season developing on the Jaguars' practice squad.

=== 2016 ===
On January 4, 2016, the Jaguars signed Koyack to a reserve/futures contract.

He competed with Jacobs, Braedon Bowman, and Neal Sterling throughout training camp for a roster spot. He made the active roster and was named the backup tight end behind Lewis and Thomas to start the regular season.

He made his professional regular season debut in the Jaguars' season-opening 27–23 loss to the Green Bay Packers. On September 24, 2016, Koyack underwent successful surgery to repair a slight tear in his meniscus. He suffered the tear four days earlier during practice and was inactive for the next two games (Weeks 3–4). On October 26, 2016, Koyack caught five passes for 41 yards during a 36–22 loss at the Titans. His first career reception came in the fourth quarter on a seven-yard pass by quarterback Blake Bortles before being tackled by Titans' defensive backs Daimion Stafford and Antwon Blake. Koyack saw an increased snap count after offensive coordinator Greg Olson was fired on October 29, 2016. On November 13, 2016, he earned his first career start and caught three passes for 35-yards in a 24–21 loss to the Houston Texans. On January 1, 2017, Koyack had three receptions for 25 yards and a touchdown during a 24–20 loss at the Indianapolis Colts. He scored his first career touchdown during the game on a 14-yard pass by Blake Bortles. Koyack finished the 2016 season with 19 receptions for 161 receiving yards and a touchdown in 14 games and seven starts.

=== 2017 ===
Although the Jaguars traded Thomas to the Miami Dolphins, Koyack still faced competition for the second tight end position from newly acquired free agent Mychal Rivera. Marrone named him the Jaguars' second tight end behind Lewis to start the season after Rivera was placed on injured reserve due to a lingering hand injury.

On October 15, 2017, Koyack caught a 21-yard pass during a 27–17 loss to the Los Angeles Rams. In Week 9, he made his first start of the season during the Jaguars' 23–7 win against the Cincinnati Bengals. Overall, in the 2017 season, he finished with five receptions for 38 yards in 16 games and three starts.

The Jaguars won the AFC South and made the playoffs. On January 7, 2018, Koyack caught his first career postseason touchdown catch in a 10–3 victory over the Buffalo Bills in the Wild Card Round. In the Divisional Round, a 45–42 victory over the Pittsburgh Steelers, he had a 21-yard reception. He appeared in the AFC Championship against the New England Patriots, but the Jaguars season ended with a 24–20 loss.

=== 2018 ===
On September 1, 2018, Koyack was waived/injured by the Jaguars and was placed on injured reserve. He was released on September 8, 2018. He was re-signed by the Jaguars on November 12, 2018. He appeared in seven games and started two in the 2018 season.

=== 2019 ===
On September 1, 2019, Koyack was released by the Jaguars. He was re-signed on October 9, 2019, after starting tight end, James O'Shaughnessy, suffered a season-ending torn ACL in a Week 5 loss to the Carolina Panthers. He appeared in 11 games and started six in the 2019 season.

After becoming a free agent in March 2020, Koyack had a tryout with the Detroit Lions on August 15, 2020, the Indianapolis Colts on August 18, 2020, and the Arizona Cardinals on September 15, 2020.
