= Tommy Bohanon =

American football player (born 1990)

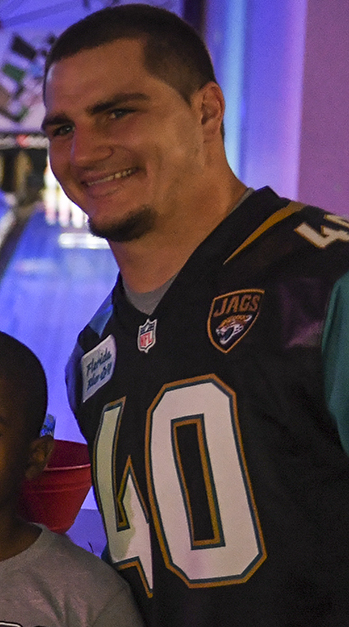
- Bohanon at Naval Station Mayport in 2017

No. 40, 48, 37
- Position: Fullback

Personal information
- Born: September 10, 1990 (age 36); Cape Coral, Florida, U.S.
- Listed height: 6 ft 1 in (1.85 m)
- Listed weight: 246 lb (112 kg)

Career information
- High school: North Fort Myers (North Fort Myers, Florida)
- College: Wake Forest (2009–2012)
- NFL draft: 2013: 7th round, 215th overall pick

Career history
- New York Jets (2013–2015); Jacksonville Jaguars (2017–2018); Green Bay Packers (2019)*; Baltimore Ravens (2020)*
- * Offseason or practice squad member only

Career NFL statistics
- Rushing attempts: 26
- Rushing yards: 72
- Rushing touchdowns: 2
- Receptions: 29
- Receiving yards: 239
- Receiving touchdowns: 1
- Stats at Pro Football Reference

Thomas Grant Bohanon (born September 10, 1990) is an American former professional football player who was a fullback and special teamer in the National Football League (NFL). He played college football for the Wake Forest Demon Deacons and was selected by the New York Jets in the seventh round of the 2013 NFL draft. He was also a member of the Jacksonville Jaguars, Green Bay Packers, and Baltimore Ravens.

== Early life ==
Bohanon attended North Fort Myers High School in North Fort Myers, Florida. He earned all-district, all-conference and all-area honors in each of his final three years of high school. He was named MVP of the Carrigan All-Star Football Classic in December 2008.

College recruiting
Name	Hometown	School	Height	Weight	40^{‡}	Commit date
Tommy Bohanon; Fullback	North Fort Myers, Florida	North Fort Myers High School	6 ft 2 in (1.88 m)	238 lb (108 kg)	4.7	Jul 1, 2008
Tommy Bohanon; Fullback	Recruit ratings: Scout: Rivals:					
Overall recruit ranking: Scout: 18 (FB) Rivals: – National, 13 (FB), – (Fla)
‡ Refers to 40-yard dash; Note: In many cases, Scout, Rivals, 247Sports, On3, and ESPN may conflict in their listings of height, weight and 40 time.; In these cases, the average was taken. ESPN grades are on a 100-point scale.; Sources: "Wake Forest Football Commitments". Rivals.; "2009 Wake Forest Football Recruiting Commits". Scout.; "Scout.com Team Recruiting Rankings". Scout.; "2009 Team Ranking". Rivals.com.

== College career ==
Bohanon played college football at Wake Forest University for the Demon Deacons as a fullback from 2009 to 2012. In the 2009 season, he appeared in nine games and had 16 carries for 51 rushing yards to go along with eight receptions for 66 receiving yards and a receiving touchdown. In the 2010 season, he appeared in 11 games and had 17 carries for 77 rushing yards to go along with 10 receptions for 76 receiving yards. In the 2011 season, he finished with 15 carries for 31 rushing yards and two rushing touchdowns to go along with nine receptions for 56 receiving yards and a receiving touchdown. In his final collegiate season in 2012, he had 23 receptions for 208 receiving yards and five receiving touchdowns. He finished his collegiate career with a total of 51 receptions, 405 receiving yards, seven receiving touchdowns, 160 rushing yards, and three career rushing touchdowns.

== Professional career ==
Pre-draft measurables
Height	Weight	Arm length	Hand span	40-yard dash	10-yard split	20-yard split	20-yard shuttle	Three-cone drill	Vertical jump	Broad jump	Bench press
6 ft 1 in (1.85 m)	246 lb (112 kg)	30 in (0.76 m)	10 1/8 in (0.26 m)	4.88 s	1.70 s	2.87 s	4.42 s	7.27 s	35 in (0.89 m)	9 ft 11 in (3.02 m)	36 reps
All values from NFL Combine

=== New York Jets ===
==== 2013 season ====
The New York Jets selected Bohanon in the seventh round (215th overall) of the 2013 NFL draft. He was the last of three fullbacks selected in 2013, behind Harvard's Kyle Juszczyk and Kansas State's Braden Wilson.

On May 10, 2013, the Jets signed Bohanon to four-year, $2.22 million contract that includes a signing bonus of $62,248.

Throughout training camp, Bohanon competed against Lex Hilliard for the job as the starting fullback that was left vacant following the departure of John Conner. Head coach Rex Ryan named Bohanon the starting fullback to begin the regular season.

The Jets finished the season with an 8–8 record despite not making the playoffs. Bohanon finished with 17 carries for 62 yards as well as 11 receptions for 69 yards. He also returned one kickoff for 15 yards. Bohanon gave the Jets a reliable receiver out of the backfield and a good short yardage back.

==== 2014 season ====
In Week 4 against the Detroit Lions, Bohanon suffered a broken collar bone, which required surgery, and was placed in injured reserve for the remainder of the 2014 year. In four games, Bohanon rushed for three yards and recorded 30 receiving yards.

==== 2015 season ====
Bohanon was the starting fullback for the Jets in 2015. He finished with four receptions for 56 receiving yards. He was the lead blocker to help Chris Ivory become the AFC's leading rusher with 1,070 rushing yards.

On September 3, 2016, Bohanon was released by the Jets as part of final roster cuts.

=== Jacksonville Jaguars ===
On April 17, 2017, the Jacksonville Jaguars signed Bohanon to a two-year, $1.48 million contract, reuniting him with former Jets' teammate Chris Ivory. On September 10, in the 29–7 season opening victory over the Houston Texans, Bohanon recorded his first career touchdown on a one-yard pass from quarterback Blake Bortles.

On December 17, in the 45–7 victory over the Houston Texans, Bohanon recorded two rushing touchdowns, taking the ball in each time from the one-yard line. He finished the 2017 season with six receptions for 43 receiving yards and a receiving touchdown to go along with five carries for five rushing yards and two rushing touchdowns. The Jaguars won the AFC South and made the playoffs. After a 10–3 victory over the Buffalo Bills in the Wild Card Round, he had a 14-yard receiving touchdown in the 45–42 victory over the Pittsburgh Steelers in the Divisional Round. In the AFC Championship, he had a 20-yard reception in the 24–20 loss to the New England Patriots.

=== Green Bay Packers ===
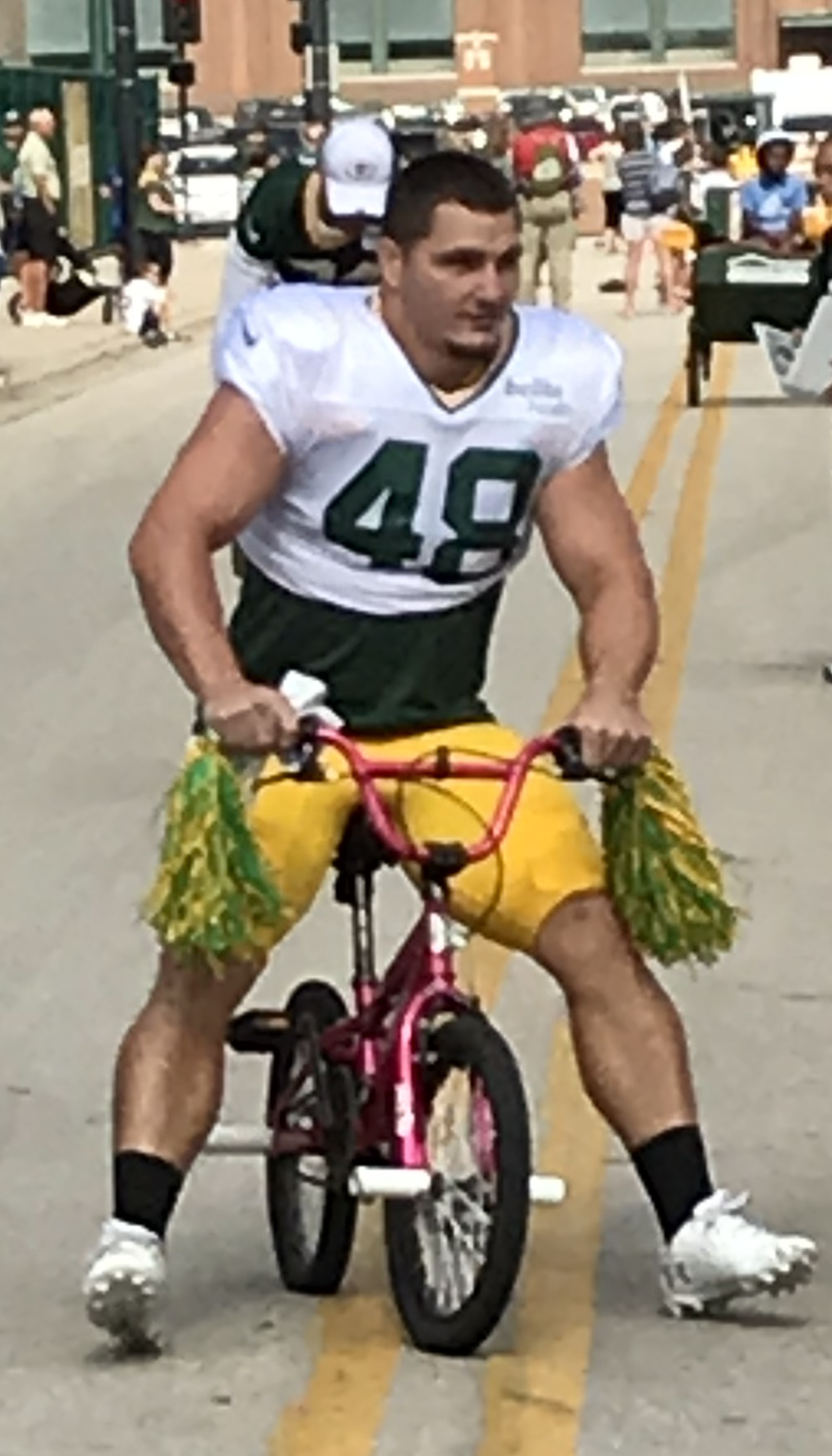
Bohanan with the Packers in 2019

On August 12, 2019, Bohanon was signed by the Green Bay Packers. On August 30, 2019, Bohanon was waived by the Packers.

In October 2019, the newly-formed XFL held their opening season draft. Bohanon was selected by the New York Guardians in the draft's open phase.

=== Baltimore Ravens ===
Bohanon signed to the Baltimore Ravens' practice squad on December 4, 2020, and was released three days later. He re-signed to the practice squad on December 11, and was released again four days later.

=== NFL statistics ===
Regular season statistics
Year	Team	Games		Rushing					Receiving					Fumbles	
Year	Team	GP	GS	Att	Yds	Avg	Lng	TD	Rec	Yds	Avg	Lng	TD	Fum	Lost
2013	NYJ	16	8	17	62	3.6	8	0	11	69	6.3	21	0	0	0
2014	NYJ	4	2	1	3	3.0	3	0	2	30	15.0	16	0	0	0
2015	NYJ	16	4	2	2	1.0	2	0	4	56	14.0	23	0	0	0
2017	JAX	16	10	5	5	1.0	3	2	6	43	7.2	14	1	0	0
2018	JAX	16	6	1	0	0.0	0	0	6	41	6.8	12	0	0	0
Career		68	30	26	72	2.8	8	2	29	239	8.2	23	1	0	0

Postseason statistics
Year	Team	Games		Rushing					Receiving					Fumbles	
Year	Team	GP	GS	Att	Yds	Avg	Lng	TD	Rec	Yds	Avg	Lng	TD	Fum	Lost
2017	JAX	3	1	0	0	0.0	0	0	2	34	17.0	20	1	0	0
Career		3	1	0	0	0.0	0	0	2	34	17.0	20	1	0	0

== Personal life ==
Bohanon is the son of Thomas and Audrey Bohanon. He majored in communications at Wake Forest. Bohanon is married to his high school sweetheart Katie. Bohanon was given the Pop Warner Humanitarian Award at the 58th Annual All-American Scholars Banquet in June 2018. It recognizes players efforts on and off the field and is given to individuals who set a positive example for today's youth by accomplishing both outstanding athletic achievements and philanthropic initiatives. Tommy and his wife also developed the Tommy Bohanon Foundation to support at-risk youth in their Southwest Florida community through their organization's programs and scholarship opportunities.
