= 2017–18 NFL playoffs =

American football tournament

- Dates: January 6 – February 4, 2018
- Season: 2017
- Teams: 12
- Games played: 11
- Super Bowl LII site: U.S. Bank Stadium; Minneapolis, Minnesota
- Defending champions: New England Patriots
- Champion: Philadelphia Eagles (4th title)
- Runner-up: New England Patriots
- Conference runners-up: Jacksonville Jaguars; Minnesota Vikings
NFL playoffs
← 2016–17	2018–19 →

The National Football League playoffs for the 2017 season began with the wild-card round on January 6, 2018, and concluded with Super Bowl LII on February 4, 2018, when the Philadelphia Eagles defeated the New England Patriots at U.S. Bank Stadium in Minneapolis, Minnesota.

Several teams broke long playoff droughts, as the Buffalo Bills, Los Angeles Rams, Jacksonville Jaguars and Tennessee Titans each qualified for the playoffs for the first time since 1999, 2004, 2007 and 2008, respectively.

This was the first postseason since 2008–09 to not feature Aaron Rodgers and the Green Bay Packers and the first since 2001–02 without the Manning name (Peyton or Eli).

The playoffs were also notable for the Patriots reaching a seventh consecutive AFC Championship Game, extending their own NFL record, and the Eagles snapping a 57-year championship drought and claiming their first in the Super Bowl era.

For the first time since 2013–14, no games went to overtime.

== Participants ==
Within each conference, the four division winners and the top two non-division winners with the best overall regular season records) qualified for the playoffs. The four division winners are seeded 1–4 based on their overall won-lost-tied record, and the wild card teams are seeded 5–6. The NFL does not use a fixed bracket playoff system, and there are no restrictions regarding teams from the same division matching up in any round. In the first round, dubbed the wild-card playoffs or wild-card weekend, the third-seeded division winner hosts the sixth-seed wild card, and the fourth seed hosts the fifth. The 1 and 2 seeds from each conference received a first-round bye. In the second round, the divisional playoffs, the number 1 seed hosts the worst-surviving seed from the first round (seed 4, 5, or 6), while the number 2 seed will play the other team (seed 3, 4, or 5). The two surviving teams from each conference's divisional playoff games met in the respective AFC and NFC Conference Championship games, hosted by the higher seed. Although the Super Bowl, the championship round of the playoffs, is played at a neutral site, the designated home team is based on an annual rotation by conference.

Playoff seeds
Seed	AFC	NFC
1	New England Patriots (East winner)	Philadelphia Eagles (East winner)
2	Pittsburgh Steelers (North winner)	Minnesota Vikings (North winner)
3	Jacksonville Jaguars (South winner)	Los Angeles Rams (West winner)
4	Kansas City Chiefs (West winner)	New Orleans Saints (South winner)
5	Tennessee Titans (wild card)	Carolina Panthers (wild card)
6	Buffalo Bills (wild card)	Atlanta Falcons (wild card)

== Bracket ==
Jan 7 – Mercedes-Benz Superdome	Jan 14 – U.S. Bank Stadium
5	Carolina	26
4	New Orleans	24
4	New Orleans	31	Jan 21 – Lincoln Financial Field
2	Minnesota	29
NFC
Jan 6 – Los Angeles Memorial Coliseum	2	Minnesota	7
Jan 13 – Lincoln Financial Field
1	Philadelphia	38
6	Atlanta	26	NFC Championship
6	Atlanta	10
3	LA Rams	13	Feb 4 – U.S. Bank Stadium
1	Philadelphia	15
Wild Card playoffs
Divisional playoffs
Jan 7 – EverBank Field	N1	Philadelphia	41
Jan 14 – Heinz Field
A1	New England	33
6	Buffalo	3	Super Bowl LII
3	Jacksonville	45
3	Jacksonville	10	Jan 21 – Gillette Stadium
2	Pittsburgh	42
AFC
Jan 6 – Arrowhead Stadium	3	Jacksonville	20
Jan 13 – Gillette Stadium
1	New England	24
5	Tennessee	22	AFC Championship
5	Tennessee	14
4	Kansas City	21
1	New England	35

== Schedule ==
Round	Away team	Score	Home team	Date	Kickoff (EST / UTC–5)	TV	Viewers (millions)	TV rating
Wild-card round	Tennessee Titans	22–21	Kansas City Chiefs	January 6, 2018	4:35 p.m.	ABC/ESPN	22.2	13.0
Wild-card round	Atlanta Falcons	26–13	Los Angeles Rams	January 6, 2018	8:15 p.m.	NBC	22.8	12.8
Wild-card round	Buffalo Bills	3–10	Jacksonville Jaguars	January 7, 2018	1:05 p.m.	CBS	25.3	15.2
Wild-card round	Carolina Panthers	26–31	New Orleans Saints	January 7, 2018	4:40 p.m.	Fox	31.2	17.5
Divisional round	Atlanta Falcons	10–15	Philadelphia Eagles	January 13, 2018	4:35 p.m.	NBC	27.1	15.5
Divisional round	Tennessee Titans	14–35	New England Patriots	January 13, 2018	8:15 p.m.	CBS	26.7	14.5
Divisional round	Jacksonville Jaguars	45–42	Pittsburgh Steelers	January 14, 2018	1:05 p.m.	CBS	31.4	18.3
Divisional round	New Orleans Saints	24–29	Minnesota Vikings	January 14, 2018	4:40 p.m.	Fox	35.6	19.3
Conference championships	Jacksonville Jaguars	20–24	New England Patriots	January 21, 2018	3:05 p.m.	CBS	44.1	24.3
Conference championships	Minnesota Vikings	7–38	Philadelphia Eagles	January 21, 2018	6:40 p.m.	Fox	42.3	21.7
Super Bowl LII U.S. Bank Stadium Minneapolis, Minnesota	Philadelphia Eagles	41–33	New England Patriots	February 4, 2018	6:30 p.m.	NBC	103.4	43.1

== Wild-card round ==
=== Saturday, January 6, 2018 ===
==== AFC: Tennessee Titans 22, Kansas City Chiefs 21 ====
Tennessee Titans vs. Kansas City Chiefs – Game summary

Quarter	1	2	3	4	Total
Titans	0	3	7	12	22
Chiefs	14	7	0	0	21

at Arrowhead Stadium, Kansas City, Missouri

- Date: January 6, 2018
- Game time: 4:35 p.m. EST/3:35 p.m. CST
- Game weather: Sunny, 33 °F (1 °C)
- Game attendance: 73,319
- Referee: Jeff Triplette
- TV announcers (ABC/ESPN): Sean McDonough (play-by-play), Jon Gruden (color commentator), Lisa Salters (sideline reporter)
- Recap, Game Book

Game information

First quarter

- KC – Kareem Hunt 1-yard run (Harrison Butker kick), 7:07. Chiefs 7–0. Drive: 6 plays, 81 yards, 2:56.
- KC – Travis Kelce 13-yard pass from Alex Smith (Harrison Butker kick), 2:15. Chiefs 14–0. Drive: 5 plays, 76 yards, 3:24.

Second quarter

- TEN – Ryan Succop 49-yard field goal, 1:55. Chiefs 14–3. Drive: 8 plays, 48 yards, 4:02.
- KC – Demarcus Robinson 14-yard pass from Alex Smith (Harrison Butker kick), 0:03. Chiefs 21–3. Drive: 9 plays, 79 yards, 1:52.

Third quarter

- TEN – Marcus Mariota 6-yard pass from Marcus Mariota (Ryan Succop kick), 6:31. Chiefs 21–10. Drive: 15 plays, 91 yards, 8:29.

Fourth quarter

- TEN – Derrick Henry 35-yard run (pass failed), 14:08. Chiefs 21–16. Drive: 6 plays, 62 yards, 3:17.
- TEN – Eric Decker 22-yard pass from Marcus Mariota (pass failed), 6:06. Titans 22–21. Drive: 11 plays, 80 yards, 5:09.

Top passers

- TEN – Marcus Mariota – 19/31, 205 yards, 2 TD, INT
- KC – Alex Smith – 24/33, 264 yards, 2 TD

Top rushers

- TEN – Derrick Henry – 23 rushes, 156 yards, TD
- KC – Kareem Hunt – 11 rushes, 42 yards, TD

Top receivers

- TEN – Delanie Walker – 6 receptions, 74 yards
- KC – Tyreek Hill – 7 receptions, 87 yards

The Tennessee Titans overcame an 18-point halftime deficit to defeat the Kansas City Chiefs 22–21 and won their first playoff game since the 2003 season.

Kansas City opened the scoring on their second possession of the game. After Alex Smith connected with Tyreek Hill for 45 yards and Travis Kelce for a 27-yard completion, Kareem Hunt ran in for a one-yard touchdown. On their next drive the Chiefs drove 76 yards in five plays, with Smith completing a 26-yard pass to Hill and an 18-yard pass to receiver Albert Wilson. Following an 18-yard run by Hunt, Smith hit Kelce for a 13-yard touchdown. Smith finished the quarter with 154 passing yards, a career high.

In the second quarter, Tennessee advanced to Kansas City's 21-yard line before Marcus Mariota was intercepted by Marcus Peters, who returned the ball 28 yards to the Chiefs' 37-yard line. Following a punt, tight end Delanie Walker's 22-yard reception sparked a drive to the Chiefs' 22-yard line; however, on 3rd and 4, linebacker Derrick Johnson sacked Mariota and forced the team to settle for a 49-yard Ryan Succop field goal. The Chiefs increased their lead to 18 points by the end of the half, however, with a nine-play, 79-yard drive that culminated in a 14-yard scoring pass from Smith to Demarcus Robinson with three seconds left in the half. Kansas City went into halftime with a 21–3 lead, with more total yards (284 to 127) and more first downs (16 to 3). However, Kelce got an injury while catching a 12-yard pass on the final drive.

Tennessee opened the second half with a 15-play, 91-yard drive that consumed 8:29 off the clock. On a third-down play from the Kansas City 6-yard line, Mariota attempted a pass, which was deflected by Darrelle Revis, back to Mariota, who ran it in for a touchdown, making him the first quarterback to complete a touchdown pass to himself in a postseason game. The Chiefs were forced to punt on their next drive, but Adoree' Jackson muffed the catch and Keith Reaser recovered for Kansas City. They were unable to capitalize on the turnover, however, as they lost two yards over their next three plays and Harrison Butker hit the upright from a 48-yard field goal attempt. Tennessee took the ball back and drove 62 yards in six plays, scoring on a 35-yard run by Derrick Henry on the second play of the fourth quarter to cut the score to 21–16 after a failed two-point conversion.

Again forcing a Kansas City punt, Tennessee drove 81 yards in 11 plays to take their first lead of the game. Mariota converted three third downs on the drive, completing a 9-yard pass to Walker on 3rd and 3 scrambling 17 yards for a first down on 3rd and 8, and then connecting a 10-yard pass to tight end Jonnu Smith on 3rd and 2 . Eventually, Mariota finished the drive by throwing to Eric Decker for a 22-yard touchdown, giving Tennessee a 22–21 lead following another failed two-point conversion with 6:06 remaining. Kansas City then drove into Tennessee territory, but Alex Smith was sacked on third down by Derrick Morgan and then missed a pass to Wilson on fourth down with 2:09 left. On the second play of Tennessee's drive, Johnson recovered a Henry fumble and returned it 56 yards for a touchdown, but Henry was ruled down by contact upon review. One play later, Kansas City had one last chance to get the ball back on a 3rd and 10 situation. Mariota handed the ball off to Henry, who started to run to the middle, but then switched direction and ran to the left. Aided by a key block from Mariota against linebacker Frank Zombo, Henry raced 22 yards down the left sideline for a first down, and the Titans ran out the rest of the clock, having held the Chiefs to 41 yards and three first downs in the second half.

Alex Smith finished as the leading passer with 264 yards and two touchdowns, but only 110 yards after the first quarter. Mariota threw for 205 yards, two touchdowns and an interception in his first playoff start; his touchdown pass to himself made him the first player since at least 1950 to throw and catch a touchdown pass in the same playoff game. Henry gained 156 yards on 23 carries and 191 total yards from scrimmage, while Hunt, the league's leading rusher during the regular season, gained just 42 yards on 11 carries. Chiefs coach Andy Reid faced criticism for not relying on Hunt to protect their lead in the second half, as Hunt only carried the ball five times after halftime.

Tennessee became the first road team to erase an 18-point deficit to win a postseason game since the 1972 playoffs. The loss was Kansas City's sixth consecutive home playoff loss, extending a league record.

==== NFC: Atlanta Falcons 26, Los Angeles Rams 13 ====
Atlanta Falcons vs. Los Angeles Rams – Game summary

Quarter	1	2	3	4	Total
Falcons	6	7	6	7	26
Rams	0	10	0	3	13

at Los Angeles Memorial Coliseum, Los Angeles, California

- Date: January 6, 2018
- Game time: 8:15 p.m. EST/5:15 p.m. PST
- Game weather: Cloudy, 62 °F (17 °C)
- Game attendance: 74,300
- Referee: Ed Hochuli
- TV announcers (NBC): Al Michaels (play-by-play), Cris Collinsworth (color commentator), Michele Tafoya (sideline reporter)
- Recap, Game Book

Game information

First quarter

- ATL – Matt Bryant 29-yard field goal, 7:13. Falcons 3–0. Drive: 4 plays, 6 yards, 1:27.
- ATL – Matt Bryant 51-yard field goal, 1:22. Falcons 6–0. Drive: 9 plays, 57 yards, 4:12.

Second quarter

- ATL – Devonta Freeman 3-yard run (Matt Bryant kick), 11:34. Falcons 13–0. Drive: 8 plays, 32 yards, 4:41.
- LAR – Cooper Kupp 14-yard pass from Jared Goff (Sam Ficken kick), 2:34. Falcons 13–7. Drive: 7 plays, 79 yards, 3:05.
- LAR – Sam Ficken 35-yard field goal, 0:03. Falcons 13–10. Drive: 6 plays, 67 yards, 1:12.

Third quarter

- ATL – Matt Bryant 25-yard field goal, 6:45. Falcons 16–10. Drive: 16 plays, 76 yards, 8:15.
- ATL – Matt Bryant 54-yard field goal, 0:19. Falcons 19–10. Drive: 10 plays, 45 yards, 4:52.

Fourth quarter

- LAR – Sam Ficken 32-yard field goal, 10:49. Falcons 19–13. Drive: 9 plays, 67 yards, 10:49.
- ATL – Julio Jones 8-yard pass from Matt Ryan (Matt Bryant kick), 5:48. Falcons 26–13. Drive: 8 plays, 83 yards, 5:01.

Top passers

- ATL – Matt Ryan – 21/30, 218 yards, TD
- LAR – Jared Goff – 24/45, 259 yards, TD

Top rushers

- ATL – Devonta Freeman – 18 rushes, 66 yards, TD
- LAR – Todd Gurley – 14 rushes, 101 yards

Top receivers

- ATL – Julio Jones – 9 receptions, 94 yards, TD
- LAR – Robert Woods – 9 receptions, 142 yards

In the first playoff game at the Los Angeles Memorial Coliseum since the 1993 NFL season, and the first Rams playoff hosted at the venue since the 1978 NFL season, Matt Ryan threw for 218 yards and a touchdown, and kicker Matt Bryant kicked four field goals to beat the Rams.

Atlanta got an early scoring opportunity when Blake Countess muffed a punt that Falcons linebacker LaRoy Reynolds recovered on the Rams' 17-yard line, leading to Matt Bryant's 29-yard field goal. Then, after a punt, Atlanta receiver Julio Jones caught a 27-yard pass and rushed for 13 yards on an end-around play as the team drove 57 yards in nine plays to go up 6–0 on Bryant's 51-yard field goal. Damontae Kazee forced a fumble from Pharoh Cooper on the ensuing kickoff, which Kemal Ishmael recovered for Atlanta on the Rams' 32-yard line. This time, the Falcons were able to take the ball to the end zone, scoring on a 3-yard touchdown run by Devonta Freeman as a result of center Alex Mack literally dragging him across the goal line.

Late in the second quarter, the Rams finally managed to get on the board, sparked by a 26-yard run by Todd Gurley. Jared Goff finished the drive with passes to Cooper Kupp, the first for 15 yards and the second a 14-yard touchdown completion that made the score 13–7. The next time they had the ball, only 1:15 remained in the half, but they were able to convert a 38-yard completion from Goff to Robert Woods into a 35-yard Sam Ficken field goal, making the score 13–10 at halftime.

The Falcons took up more than half the third quarter with their opening drive, moving the ball 76 yards in 16 plays. Freeman carried the ball six times for 42 yards, while quarterback Matt Ryan converted a 4th and 1 with a QB sneak. Bryant finished the possession with his third field goal, this one from 25 yards, increasing their lead to 16–10. After a Rams punt, Ryan's completions to Jones for gains of 12 and 16 yards set up Bryant's fourth field goal, a 51-yard kick, to put the team up 19–10. The Rams quickly struck back, with Gurley rushing twice for gains of 14 and 33 yards, along with Goff completing an 18-yard pass to Woods. Ficken's 32-yard field goal at the end of the drive cut the deficit to 19–13 with just over 10 minutes left. However, Atlanta came back with an eight-play, 83-yard drive featuring a 52-yard completion from Ryan to Mohamed Sanu. On the last play, Ryan's 8-yard touchdown pass to Jones put his team up 26–13. The Rams responded with one last drive to try and get back in the game, moving the ball to a 3rd and goal situation on Atlanta's 5-yard line. Goff then appeared to complete a 5-yard touchdown pass to tight end Tyler Higbee, but the call was reversed when replays showed the ball hit the ground as Higbee was going to the turf. On the next play, Goff threw an incomplete pass, causing a turnover on downs with 2:05 left. The Rams received the ball one more time, but this resulted in another turnover on downs.

Ryan completed 21 of 30 passes for 213 yards and a touchdown, while Jones caught nine passes for 94 yards and a touchdown. Goff finished the day 24-for-45 for 259 yards and a touchdown. His top target was Woods, who caught nine passes for 142 yards. Gurley was the game's top rusher with 101 yards on 14 carries, while also catching four passes for 10 yards.

This was the first Atlanta road playoff win since 2002.

=== Sunday, January 7, 2018 ===
==== AFC: Jacksonville Jaguars 10, Buffalo Bills 3 ====
Buffalo Bills vs. Jacksonville Jaguars – Game summary

Quarter	1	2	3	4	Total
Bills	0	3	0	0	3
Jaguars	0	3	7	0	10

at EverBank Field, Jacksonville, Florida

- Date: January 7, 2018
- Game time: 1:05 p.m. EST
- Game weather: Sunny, 53 °F (12 °C)
- Game attendance: 69,442
- Referee: John Hussey
- TV announcers (CBS): Jim Nantz (play-by-play), Tony Romo (color commentator), Tracy Wolfson and Jay Feely (sideline reporters)
- Recap, Game Book

Game information

First quarter

- No scoring plays.

Second quarter

- BUF – Stephen Hauschka 31-yard field goal, 1:49. Bills 3–0. Drive: 18 plays, 71 yards, 8:06.
- JAX – Josh Lambo 44-yard field goal, 0:02. Tied 3–3. Drive: 6 plays, 27 yards, 0:38.

Third quarter

- JAX – Ben Koyack 1-yard pass from Blake Bortles (Josh Lambo kick), 0:42. Jaguars 10–3. Drive: 15 plays, 86 yards, 8:52.

Fourth quarter

- No scoring plays.

Top passers

- BUF – Tyrod Taylor – 17/37, 134 yards, INT
- JAX – Blake Bortles – 12/23, 87 yards, TD

Top rushers

- BUF – LeSean McCoy – 19 rushes, 75 yards
- JAX – Blake Bortles – 10 rushes, 88 yards

Top receivers

- BUF – LeSean McCoy – 6 receptions, 44 yards
- JAX – Dede Westbrook – 5 receptions, 48 yards

This marked the Bills' first playoff appearance since 1999.

In the Jaguars' first playoff appearance since 2007 and the lowest scoring NFL postseason game since the 1997 season, Jacksonville's 15-play, 86-yard touchdown drive in the third quarter was enough to propel them to victory.

Every drive in the first quarter ended in a punt. Early in the second quarter, Jacksonville got a chance to score when Aaron Colvin intercepted a pass from Bills quarterback Tyrod Taylor on the Buffalo 35-yard line. However, the team lost three yards over the next three plays and decided to punt rather than risk a long field goal. From there, Buffalo took up nearly all the remaining time in the quarter, driving all the way to the Jaguars' 1-yard line. However, an offensive pass interference penalty against receiver Kelvin Benjamin pushed them back 10 yards and they ended up settling for a 31-yard Steven Hauschka field goal to take a 3–0 lead with 1:49 left in the half. After an exchange of punts, Jacksonville got the ball on their own 47-yard line with 40 seconds left and quarterback Blake Bortles scrambled twice for gains of 20 and 12 yards to set up Josh Lambo's 44-yard field goal, tying the score at halftime.

On the Jaguars' second possession of the second half, they drove 86 yards in 15 plays to take a 10–3 lead. The key player of the drive was running back Leonard Fournette, who carried the ball eight times for 33 yards and caught a pass for 12 yards. Eventually the team faced 4th and goal on the 1-yard line and decided to go for the touchdown; the decision paid off as Bortles threw a pass to tight end Ben Koyack for the score with 42 seconds left in the third quarter. Jacksonville's defense then locked the Bills down in the fourth quarter, forcing three punts and an interception by Jalen Ramsey on the Jaguars' 48-yard line with 26 seconds left.

Bortles completed only 12 of 23 passes for 87 yards and a touchdown, but was also the game's leading rusher with 88 yards on the ground. Bills running back LeSean McCoy rushed for 75 yards and caught six passes for 44 yards.

==== NFC: New Orleans Saints 31, Carolina Panthers 26 ====
Carolina Panthers vs. New Orleans Saints – Game summary

Quarter	1	2	3	4	Total
Panthers	0	9	3	14	26
Saints	7	14	3	7	31

at Mercedes-Benz Superdome, New Orleans, Louisiana

- Date: January 7, 2018
- Game time: 4:40 p.m. EST/3:40 p.m. CST
- Game weather: Played indoors (domed stadium)
- Game attendance: 73,186
- Referee: Tony Corrente
- TV announcers (Fox): Joe Buck (play-by-play), Troy Aikman (color commentator), Erin Andrews and Chris Myers (sideline reporters)
- Recap, Game Book

Game information

First quarter

- NO – Ted Ginn Jr. 80-yard pass from Drew Brees (Wil Lutz kick), 1:46. Saints 7–0. Drive: 2 plays, 80 yards, 0:18.

Second quarter

- CAR – Graham Gano 27-yard field goal, 14:12. Saints 7–3. Drive: 6 plays, 66 yards, 2:34.
- NO – Josh Hill 9-yard pass from Drew Brees (Wil Lutz kick), 9:04. Saints 14–3. Drive: 9 plays, 75 yards, 5:08.
- CAR – Graham Gano 39-yard field goal, 2:47. Saints 14–6. Drive: 12 plays, 54 yards, 6:17.
- NO – Zach Line 1-yard run (Wil Lutz kick), 0:43. Saints 21–6. Drive: 8 plays, 75 yards, 2:04.
- CAR – Graham Gano 58-yard field goal, 0:00. Saints 21–9. Drive: 5 plays, 35 yards, 0:43.

Third quarter

- CAR – Graham Gano 29-yard field goal, 10:58. Saints 21–12. Drive: 9 plays, 64 yards, 4:02.
- NO – Wil Lutz 57-yard field goal, 6:05. Saints 24–12. Drive: 10 plays, 36 yards, 4:53.

Fourth quarter

- CAR – Greg Olsen 14-yard pass from Cam Newton (Graham Gano kick), 12:47. Saints 24–19. Drive: 8 plays, 68 yards, 3:45.
- NO – Alvin Kamara 2-yard run (Wil Lutz kick), 5:08. Saints 31–19. Drive: 5 plays, 62 yards, 3:02.
- CAR – Christian McCaffrey 56-yard pass from Cam Newton (Graham Gano kick), 4:09. Saints 31–26. Drive: 3 plays, 75 yards, 0:59.

Top passers

- CAR – Cam Newton – 24/40, 349 yards, 2 TD
- NO – Drew Brees – 23/33, 376 yards, 2 TD, INT

Top rushers

- CAR – Jonathan Stewart – 11 rushes, 51 yards
- NO – Alvin Kamara – 10 rushes, 23 yards, TD

Top receivers

- CAR – Greg Olsen – 8 receptions, 107 yards, TD
- NO – Michael Thomas – 8 receptions, 131 yards

This was the first postseason meeting between the Panthers and Saints.

Carolina had a chance to score on their second possession of the game, driving to a 3rd and goal on the Saints' 7-yard line. But over the next two plays, Kaelin Clay dropped a potential touchdown catch in the end zone and then Graham Gano missed a 25-yard field goal attempt. On the second play after the missed field goal, New Orleans quarterback Drew Brees threw a deep pass down the middle of the field to Ted Ginn Jr., who evaded a tackle attempt by James Bradberry and ran all the way to the end zone for an 80-yard touchdown reception. This gave New Orleans a 7–0 lead with less than two minutes left in the first quarter.

Carolina responded on their next drive, converting a 22-yard completion from Cam Newton to Greg Olsen and a 39-yard pass interference penalty against cornerback Ken Crawley into a 27-yard Gano field goal that cut the score to 7–3. However, New Orleans responded immediately, with Brees completing passes to Michael Thomas for gains of 19, 8 and 13 yards, as well as passes to running backs Mark Ingram II and Alvin Kamara for gains of 13 and 10 yards. On the last play of the drive, Brees put the Saints up 14–3 with a 9-yard touchdown pass to tight end Josh Hill. Carolina struck back, with Newton completing a 19-yard pass to Brenton Bersin and converting a fourth-and-1 with a quarterback sneak. Gano finished the 54-yard drive with a 39-yard field goal to make the score 14–6 with 2:47 left in the half. Brees responded by completing 4 of 6 passes for 67 yards on the way to a 1-yard touchdown run by fullback Zach Line, increasing the Saints' lead to 21–6. Taking the ball back with just over 40 seconds left, Newton completed a 24-yard pass to Devin Funchess. A few more plays moved the ball to the Saints' 40-yard line, where Gano barely managed to squeeze a 58-yard field goal inside the left upright, tying the NFL record for the longest field goal in postseason history.

The Panthers continued to chip away at their deficit with their first drive of the second half, as they moved the ball 64 yards in nine plays on a possession that featured a 29-yard run by Jonathan Stewart. Gano finished the drive with his fourth field goal, making the score 21–12. But New Orleans was able to respond, with Ginn catching two passes for 30 yards on a 36-yard drive that ended with Wil Lutz kicking a 57-yard field goal, bringing their lead back up to 24–12. With less than two minutes left in the third quarter, the Panthers started a 68-yard drive in which Olsen caught three passes for 54 total yards, the last one a 14-yard touchdown catch that cut the score to 24–19.

Following a few punts, Brees' 46-yard completion to Thomas gave the Saints a first down on the Carolina 5-yard line, where they went on to score with Kamara's 2-yard touchdown run and go up 31–19 with 5:08 left. However, the game was not over at this point. On the third play of the Panthers' next drive, Newton completed a short pass to running back Christian McCaffrey, who raced 56 yards for a touchdown, cutting the score to 31–26. New Orleans took the ball back and moved the ball to the 47 yard line at the two minute warning. Deciding to go for the first down to try to seal the game, Brees threw a pass that was intercepted by safety Mike Adams, giving the ball back to the Panthers, though Adams' decision to intercept the ball instead of batting the pass down ended up costing his team 16 yards. With no timeouts left and a chance to mount a game-winning drive, Carolina then drove to the Saints' 21-yard line. On second down, Newton was flagged for intentional grounding while throwing a pass to avoid a sack. Then after an incompletion, safety Vonn Bell sacked Newton, forcing a turnover on downs with four seconds left.

Newton finished the game 24-of-40 for 349 yards and two touchdowns, along with 37 yards on the ground. His top target was Olsen (eight receptions for 107 yards and a touchdown), who was one of four players in this game to have over 100 receiving yards. The others were McCaffrey (six for 101 yards and a touchdown), Thomas (eight receptions for 131 yards) and Ginn (four receptions for 115 yards and a touchdown). Brees was 23-of-33 for 376 yards with two touchdowns and one interception. Bell had nine tackles – seven solo – and a sack.

== Divisional round ==
=== Saturday, January 13, 2018 ===
==== NFC: Philadelphia Eagles 15, Atlanta Falcons 10 ====
Atlanta Falcons vs. Philadelphia Eagles – Game summary

Quarter	1	2	3	4	Total
Falcons	3	7	0	0	10
Eagles	0	9	3	3	15

at Lincoln Financial Field, Philadelphia, Pennsylvania

- Date: January 13, 2018
- Game time: 4:35 p.m. EST
- Game weather: Sunny, 32 °F (0 °C)
- Game attendance: 69,596
- Referee: Bill Vinovich
- TV announcers (NBC): Al Michaels (play-by-play), Cris Collinsworth (color commentator), Michele Tafoya (sideline reporter)
- Recap, Game Book

Game information

First quarter

- ATL – Matt Bryant 33-yard field goal, 9:05. Falcons 3–0. Drive: 11 plays, 59 yards, 5:32.

Second quarter

- PHI – LeGarrette Blount 1-yard run (kick failed), 10:28. Eagles 6–3. Drive: 14 plays, 86 yards, 6:44.
- ATL – Devonta Freeman 6-yard pass from Matt Ryan (Matt Bryant kick), 5:41. Falcons 10–6. Drive: 4 plays, 18 yards, 1:50.
- PHI – Jake Elliott 53-yard field goal, 0:00. Falcons 10–9. Drive: 5 plays, 37 yards, 0:46.

Third quarter

- PHI – Jake Elliott 37-yard field goal, 0:11. Eagles 12–10. Drive: 12 plays, 74 yards, 5:42.

Fourth quarter

- PHI – Jake Elliott 21-yard field goal, 6:02. Eagles 15–10. Drive: 14 plays, 80 yards, 7:57.

Top passers

- ATL – Matt Ryan – 22/36, 210 yards, TD
- PHI – Nick Foles – 23/30, 246 yards

Top rushers

- ATL – Tevin Coleman – 10 rushes, 79 yards
- PHI – Jay Ajayi – 15 rushes, 54 yards

Top receivers

- ATL – Julio Jones – 9 receptions, 101 yards
- PHI – Alshon Jeffery – 4 receptions, 61 yards

Philadelphia's defense recorded three sacks, held Atlanta to 281 yards – 83 below their season average – and stopped the Falcons on four consecutive plays on their own 9-yard line in the final minutes to preserve a 15–10 win.

The Eagles seemed primed to score on their opening drive when a 42-yard pass interference penalty on cornerback Brian Poole gave them the ball on the Falcons' 33-yard line. But on the next play, safety Ricardo Allen forced a fumble from Jay Ajayi that was recovered by safety Keanu Neal. Atlanta then drove 59 yards in 11 plays to score on Matt Bryant's 33-yard field goal, giving them a 3–0 lead. After the teams exchanged punts, Ajayi rushed four times for 26 yards and wide receiver Nelson Agholor ran for 21 yards on an end-around play, setting up 1st-and-goal on the Atlanta 3-yard line. The Falcons' defense kept the Eagles out of the end zone for the first three plays, but on fourth down, running back LeGarrette Blount finished the 86-yard drive with a 1-yard touchdown, putting Philadelphia up 6–3 with 10:28 left in the half after kicker Jake Elliott hit the left upright on his extra point attempt.

Atlanta had to punt on their next drive, but the ball bounced off the back of Eagles linebacker Bryan Braman and was recovered by Falcons linebacker LaRoy Reynolds on the Philadelphia 18-yard line, where they took back the lead, 10–6, with quarterback Matt Ryan's 6-yard touchdown pass to running back Devonta Freeman. After another punt exchange, the Eagles got the ball on their own 28-yard line with 46 seconds left in the half. Quarterback Nick Foles completed a 20-yard pass to wide receiver Torrey Smith (which was inadvertently batted back by Neal), then a 15-yard pass to wide receiver Alshon Jeffery to set up Elliott's 53-yard field goal as time expired in the half, cutting Atlanta's lead to 10–9.

With just under six minutes left in the third quarter, the Eagles got the ball on their own 7-yard line due to a 39-yard punt by Matt Bosher. From there, Foles completed 5 of 7 passes for 70 yards – Jeffery caught three of them for 46 – on a 74-yard, 12-play drive to retake the lead at 12–10 with Elliott's 37-yard field goal. Elliott's ensuing kickoff went out of bounds, giving Atlanta good field position on their own 40-yard line. On the next play, the last of the third quarter, Ryan was sacked for a 10-yard loss by safety Rodney McLeod. The Falcons ended up going three and out and their defense was soon back on the field trying to contain another long Eagles drive. This one went for 14 plays and 80 yards, 32 of them on a reception by Ajayi, taking 7:57 off the clock. Desmond Trufant managed to end the drive on the Atlanta 3-yard line by tackling Clement a yard short of a first down. However, Elliott kicked his third field goal on the next play, giving Philadelphia a 15–10 lead with 6:02 remaining. Atlanta took the ball back and drove to a first down on the Eagles' 9-yard line, featuring a 20-yard reception by Julio Jones on 4th down. After throwing incomplete passes on the next two plays, Ryan threw a 7-yard pass to Jones on the 2-yard line. Then on fourth down with 1:05 left, Ryan tried to connect with Jones in the end zone, but the pass went through his hands, enabling the Eagles to get the ball back and run out the clock.

Filling in for injured starter Carson Wentz, Foles completed 23 of 30 passes for 246 yards. Ajayi rushed for 54 yards and caught three passes for 44 yards. Ryan completed 22 of 36 passes for 210 yards and a touchdown. Jones caught nine passes for 101 yards and rushed for 21 yards, while Tevin Coleman was the top rusher of the game with 10 carries for 79 yards, while also catching a pass for 14 yards.

With the win, the Eagles won their first playoff game and advanced to their first NFC Championship appearance since 2008, and their first at home since 2004.

==== AFC: New England Patriots 35, Tennessee Titans 14 ====
Tennessee Titans vs. New England Patriots – Game summary

Quarter	1	2	3	4	Total
Titans	7	0	0	7	14
Patriots	0	21	7	7	35

at Gillette Stadium, Foxborough, Massachusetts

- Date: January 13, 2018
- Game time: 8:15 p.m. EST
- Game weather: Clear and cold, 24 °F (−4 °C)
- Game attendance: 65,878
- Referee: Ronald Torbert
- TV announcers (CBS): Jim Nantz (play-by-play), Tony Romo (color commentator), Tracy Wolfson and Jay Feely (sideline reporters)
- Recap, Game Book

Game information

First quarter

- TEN – Corey Davis 15-yard pass from Marcus Mariota (Ryan Succop kick), 1:14. Titans 7–0. Drive: 11 plays, 95 yards, 5:17.

Second quarter

- NE – James White 5-yard pass from Tom Brady (Stephen Gostkowski kick), 13:18. Tied 7–7. Drive: 7 plays, 73 yards, 2:56.
- NE – James White 6-yard run (Stephen Gostkowski kick), 9:20. Patriots 14–7. Drive: 6 plays, 48 yards, 1:56.
- NE – Chris Hogan 4-yard pass from Tom Brady (Stephen Gostkowski kick), 1:52. Patriots 21–7. Drive: 16 plays, 91 yards, 5:18.

Third quarter

- NE – Brandon Bolden 2-yard run (Stephen Gostkowski kick), 4:02. Patriots 28–7. Drive: 9 plays, 56 yards, 4:20.

Fourth quarter

- NE – Rob Gronkowski 4-yard pass from Tom Brady (Stephen Gostkowski kick), 10:22. Patriots 35–7. Drive: 15 plays, 90 yards, 6:58.
- TEN – Corey Davis 11-yard pass from Marcus Mariota (Ryan Succop kick), 1:55. Patriots 35–14. Drive: 16 plays, 80 yards, 3:53.

Top passers

- TEN – Marcus Mariota – 22/37, 254 yards, 2 TD
- NE – Tom Brady – 35/53, 337 yards, 3 TD

Top rushers

- TEN – Marcus Mariota – 4 rushes, 37 yards
- NE – Dion Lewis – 15 rushes, 62 yards

Top receivers

- TEN – Eric Decker – 6 receptions, 85 yards
- NE – Danny Amendola – 11 receptions, 112 yards

New England racked up 438 yards of offense, 31 first downs and eight sacks as they advanced to their seventh consecutive AFC Championship game.

Midway through the first quarter, Tennessee drove 95 yards in 11 plays, featuring a 36-yard completion from Marcus Mariota to tight end Delanie Walker. Mariota finished the drive with a 15-yard touchdown pass to Corey Davis, who made a running one-handed catch in the back corner of the end zone to put the Titans up 7–0. However, the Patriots stormed right back, with Tom Brady completing five consecutive passes for 67 yards, the longest a 32-yard completion to Dion Lewis and the last a five-yard shovel pass to James White for a touchdown that tied the score. After a Tennessee punt, Brady completed three consecutive passes for 28 yards as the team drove 48 yards in six plays to go up 14–7 on White's six-yard touchdown run with 9:20 left in the half.

The next time New England got the ball, they had to punt after three plays, but a neutral zone infraction penalty on Titans Brynden Trawick gave them a first down. Taking advantage of their second chance, they ended up driving 91 yards in 16 plays to take a 21–7 lead on Brady's six-yard touchdown pass to Chris Hogan. Tennessee then drove to the Patriots' 46-yard line, Derrick Henry tried to run for a first down, but cornerbacks Malcolm Butler and Stephon Gilmore tackled him for no gain. With 17 seconds left, the Patriots were able to get to the Titans' 35-yard line with time remaining, but Stephen Gostkowski missed a 53-yard field goal attempt as time expired. In the first half alone, Brady completed 21 of 31 passes for 206 yards and two touchdowns.

In the third quarter, Brett Kern's 40-yard punt from his own 16-yard line gave the Patriots good field position on their 44-yard line. On the next play, Brady completed a 27-yard pass to tight end Rob Gronkowski and the team went on to increase their lead to 28–7 with Brandon Bolden's two-yard touchdown run. The next time New England got the ball, they went on a 15-play, 90-yard drive in which they only faced two third downs. Brady completed seven passes for 78 yards on the drive, the longest a 25-yard throw to Danny Amendola, and finished it off with a four-yard touchdown toss to Gronkowski, making the score 35–7 with 10:22 left. Before the end of the quarter, the Titans were able to make it 35–14 with Mariota's 11-yard touchdown pass to Davis on fourth down at the end of an 80-yard, 16-play drive.

At 40 years, 163 days, Brady became the oldest quarterback to lead his team to victory in a postseason game, finishing the day 35-of-53 for 337 yards and three touchdowns. Amendola caught 11 passes for 112 yards, while also returning three punts for 18 yards. Lewis rushed for 62 yards, caught nine passes for 79 yards and returned a kickoff for 27 yards. Linebacker Geneo Grissom and defensive end Deatrich Wise Jr. each had two sacks for New England. Mariota completed 22 of 37 passes for 225 yards and two touchdowns.

This game set the NFL postseason record for the largest age difference between opposing quarterbacks: Brady was 40 and Mariota was 24.

=== Sunday, January 14, 2018 ===
==== AFC: Jacksonville Jaguars 45, Pittsburgh Steelers 42 ====
Jacksonville Jaguars vs. Pittsburgh Steelers – Game summary

Quarter	1	2	3	4	Total
Jaguars	14	14	0	17	45
Steelers	0	14	7	21	42

at Heinz Field, Pittsburgh, Pennsylvania

- Date: January 14, 2018
- Game time: 1:05 p.m. EST
- Game weather: Sunny, 18 °F (−8 °C)
- Game attendance: 64,524
- Referee: Brad Allen
- TV announcers (CBS): Ian Eagle (play-by-play), Dan Fouts (color commentator), Evan Washburn (sideline reporter)
- Recap, Game Book

Game information

First quarter

- JAX – Leonard Fournette 1-yard run (Josh Lambo kick), 10:40. Jaguars 7–0. Drive: 8 plays, 66 yards, 4:20.
- JAX – Leonard Fournette 18-yard run (Josh Lambo kick), 5:26. Jaguars 14–0. Drive: 1 play, 18 yards, 0:05.

Second quarter

- JAX – T. J. Yeldon 4-yard run (Josh Lambo kick), 11:31. Jaguars 21–0. Drive: 11 plays, 75 yards, 4:36.
- PIT – Antonio Brown 23-yard pass from Ben Roethlisberger (Chris Boswell kick), 8:20. Jaguars 21–7. Drive: 6 plays, 64 yards, 3:11.
- JAX – Telvin Smith 50-yard fumble return (Josh Lambo kick), 2:20. Jaguars 28–7.
- PIT – Martavis Bryant 36-yard pass from Ben Roethlisberger (Chris Boswell kick), 0:25. Jaguars 28–14. Drive: 7 plays, 51 yards, 1:55.

Third quarter

- PIT – Le'Veon Bell 19-yard pass from Ben Roethlisberger (Chris Boswell kick), 9:09. Jaguars 28–21. Drive: 10 plays, 77 yards, 5:51.

Fourth quarter

- JAX – Leonard Fournette 3-yard run (Josh Lambo kick), 10:34. Jaguars 35–21. Drive: 5 plays, 61 yards, 2:10.
- PIT – Antonio Brown 43-yard pass from Ben Roethlisberger (Chris Boswell kick), 9:05. Jaguars 35–28. Drive: 5 plays, 75 yards, 1:29.
- JAX – Tommy Bohanon 14-yard pass from Blake Bortles (Josh Lambo kick), 4:19. Jaguars 42–28. Drive: 8 plays, 75 yards, 4:46.
- PIT – Le'Veon Bell 8-yard run (Chris Boswell kick), 2:18. Jaguars 42–35. Drive: 12 plays, 75 yards, 2:01.
- JAX – Josh Lambo 45-yard field goal, 1:45. Jaguars 45–35. Drive: 4 plays, 9 yards, 0:33.
- PIT – JuJu Smith-Schuster 4-yard pass from Ben Roethlisberger (Chris Boswell kick), 0:01. Jaguars 45–42. Drive: 10 plays, 75 yards, 1:44.

Top passers

- JAX – Blake Bortles – 14/26, 214 yards, TD
- PIT – Ben Roethlisberger – 37/58, 469 yards, 5 TD, INT

Top rushers

- JAX – Leonard Fournette – 25 rushes, 109 yards, 3 TD
- PIT – Le'Veon Bell – 16 rushes, 67 yards, TD

Top receivers

- JAX – T. J. Yeldon – 3 receptions, 57 yards
- PIT – Antonio Brown – 7 receptions, 132 yards, 2 TD

Jacksonville built up a 28–7 first-half lead and held off a second half Steelers comeback to win the game. It was a rematch of a regular season game in Week 5, which the Jags won 30–9 thanks to their defense intercepting Steelers quarterback Ben Roethlisberger five times.

The Jaguars drove 66 yards in eight plays on their opening drive, with Blake Bortles completing passes to tight ends Ben Koyack and James O'Shaughnessy for gains of 21 and 19 yards on the way to a one-yard fourth down touchdown run by Leonard Fournette. Later in the first quarter, linebacker Myles Jack intercepted a pass from Steelers quarterback Ben Roethlisberger on the Pittsburgh 18-yard line and Fournette increased Jacksonville's lead to 14–0 with a touchdown run on the next play. The Steelers responded with a drive to the Jacksonville 21-yard line, but on fourth- and 11, running back Le'Veon Bell was tackled by Jalen Ramsey and Malik Jackson for a four-yard loss. The Jaguars then drove 75 yards in 11 plays and scored on T. J. Yeldon's 4-yard touchdown run, increasing their lead to 21–0 with just over 11 minutes left in the half.

This time, the Steelers responded with a 64-yard scoring drive, featuring a 21-yard run by Bell and ending on Roethlisberger's 23-yard touchdown pass to Antonio Brown. But the next time Pittsburgh got the ball, Roethlisberger lost a fumble while being sacked by Yannick Ngakoue. Outside linebacker Telvin Smith recovered the ball and returned it 50 yards for a touchdown, making the score 28–7 with less than two minutes left until halftime. However, the Jaguars were penalized 15 yards for excessive celebration, before Cameron Sutton returned the ensuing kickoff 22 yards to the Jacksonville 49-yard line. Pittsburgh went on to drive 51 yards and cut their deficit to 28–14 on Roethlisberger's 36-yard touchdown completion to Martavis Bryant with 25 seconds remaining.

The Steelers drove 77 yards in 10 plays on their opening drive of the second half, cutting their deficit to 28–21 with Roethlisberger's 19-yard touchdown pass to Bell. Early in the final period, the Steelers got the ball on the Jaguars' 48-yard line due to a deflected punt, but ended up turning the ball over with an incomplete pass on fourth down On the ensuing Jacksonville drive, Bortles' 45-yard completion to Keelan Cole put them on the Steelers' 3-yard line and Fournette ran the ball in for a touchdown on the next play, giving the Jaguars a 35–21 lead. This was the start of a scoring run from both teams, cumulatively totaling 38 points in the fourth quarter. After Fournette's score, Roethlisberger started the next drive with a 21-yard completion to Brown and eventually ended it with a 43-yard touchdown pass to Brown that cut the score to 35–28. Jacksonville stormed right back, moving the ball 75 yards in eight plays, one of them a 40-yard completion from Bortles to Yeldon on third-and-5. Fullback Tommy Bohanon caught a 14-yard touchdown pass from Bortles with 4:19 left, giving the Jaguars a 42–28 lead. The Steelers responded by moving the ball 75 yards in 12 plays, the longest a 22-yard reception from Bell. Bell finished the drive with an eight-yard touchdown run, reducing his team's deficit to 42–35 with 2:19 to play. However, Pittsburgh failed to recover their ensuing onside kick attempt, resulting in Jacksonville getting the ball back on the Steelers' 36-yard line and leading to a 45-yard Josh Lambo field goal that put the Jaguars up 45–35. Pittsburgh then drove 75 yards in 10 plays, including a 42-yard completion from Roethlisberger to Brown. He ended up throwing a four-yard touchdown pass to JuJu Smith-Schuster, but by then, one second remained.

Bortles completed 14 of 26 passes for 214 yards and a touchdown. Fournette was the top rusher of the game with 25 carries for 109 yards and three touchdowns, along with two receptions for 10 yards. Setting several franchise playoff records, Roethlisberger completed 37 of 58 passes for 469 yards – the second highest total in NFL postseason history, behind Bernie Kosar's 489-yard tally, from January 1987 – with five touchdowns and an interception. Bell rushed for 67 yards and a touchdown, while also catching nine passes for 88 yards, while Brown caught seven passes for 132 yards and two touchdowns. Tight end Vance McDonald also went over 100 yards receiving, making 10 receptions for 112 yards. The Steelers lost despite gaining 545 yards of total offense, the most yards gained by a losing team in a playoff game (this record was later surpassed by the Patriots in Super Bowl LII). Ben Roethlisberger became the first NFL quarterback in a playoff game to throw for five touchdowns in a losing effort. He was the first NFL quarterback to do this in any game since Tony Romo in 2013 against the Denver Broncos. Following the game, the Steelers were criticized by their fans and the media for looking past the Jaguars to the Patriots in the AFC Championship Game, which, had the Steelers won, would have been the second consecutive AFC Championship meeting between the two teams. This was also the last game that running back Le'Veon Bell played for the Steelers, as he sat out the 2018 season due to a contract dispute, then sign with the New York Jets once he became a free agent at the start of 2019.

==== NFC: Minnesota Vikings 29, New Orleans Saints 24 ====
New Orleans Saints vs. Minnesota Vikings – Game summary

Quarter	1	2	3	4	Total
Saints	0	0	7	17	24
Vikings	10	7	0	12	29

at U.S. Bank Stadium, Minneapolis, Minnesota

- Date: January 14, 2018
- Game time: 4:40 p.m. EST/3:40 p.m. CST
- Game weather: Played indoors (domed stadium)
- Game attendance: 66,612
- Referee: Gene Steratore
- TV announcers (Fox): Joe Buck (play-by-play), Troy Aikman (color commentator), Erin Andrews and Chris Myers (sideline reporters)
- Recap, Game Book

Game information

First quarter

- MIN – Jerick McKinnon 14-yard run (Kai Forbath kick), 9:45. Vikings 7–0. Drive: 8 plays, 55 yards, 4:15.
- MIN – Kai Forbath 20-yard field goal, 4:42. Vikings 10–0. Drive: 7 plays, 79 yards, 2:27.

Second quarter

- MIN – Latavius Murray 1-yard run (Kai Forbath kick), 9:58. Vikings 17–0. Drive: 12 plays, 58 yards, 6:08.

Third quarter

- NO – Michael Thomas 14-yard pass from Drew Brees (Wil Lutz kick), 1:18. Vikings 17–7. Drive: 12 plays, 80 yards, 6:40.

Fourth quarter

- NO – Michael Thomas 3-yard pass from Drew Brees (Wil Lutz kick), 13:09. Vikings 17–14. Drive: 6 plays, 30 yards, 3:00.
- MIN – Kai Forbath 49-yard field goal, 10:12. Vikings 20–14. Drive: 7 plays, 44 yards, 2:57.
- NO – Alvin Kamara 14-yard pass from Drew Brees (Wil Lutz kick), 3:01. Saints 21–20. Drive: 4 plays, 40 yards, 2:20.
- MIN – Kai Forbath 53-yard field goal, 1:29. Vikings 23–21. Drive: 9 plays, 40 yards, 1:32.
- NO – Wil Lutz 43-yard field goal, 0:25. Saints 24–23. Drive: 11 plays, 50 yards, 1:04.
- MIN – Stefon Diggs 61-yard pass from Case Keenum (run failed), 0:00. Vikings 29–24. Drive: 4 plays, 75 yards, 0:25.

Top passers

- NO – Drew Brees – 25/40, 294 yards, 3 TD, 2 INT
- MIN – Case Keenum – 25/40, 318 yards, TD, INT

Top rushers

- NO – Alvin Kamara – 11 rushes, 43 yards
- MIN – Latavius Murray – 19 rushes, 50 yards, TD

Top receivers

- NO – Michael Thomas – 7 receptions, 85 yards, 2 TD
- MIN – Stefon Diggs – 6 receptions, 137 yards, TD

Vikings quarterback Case Keenum's 61-yard touchdown pass to Stefon Diggs on the game's final play sent them to the NFC title game for the first time since the 2009 season and marked the first time in the NFL postseason that a game was won with a touchdown on the final play of regulation. The game has been referred to as the "Minneapolis Miracle".

Minnesota dominated the first half, building up a 17–0 lead. The Saints had to punt on their opening drive and Marcus Sherels returned the ball 19 yards to the Vikings' 45-yard line before being tackled by punter Thomas Morstead. The Vikings then drove 55 yards in eight plays, including a 22-yard catch by Jarius Wright, to score on Jerick McKinnon's 14-yard touchdown run. The next time they got the ball, two pass interference penalties on Ken Crawley gave the Vikings 54 yards on a 79-yard drive that ended with Kai Forbath's 20-yard field goal, increasing their lead to 10–0. Following two more possessions, Vikings safety Andrew Sendejo intercepted a pass from Drew Brees, giving Minnesota the ball on their own 42-yard line with 1:06 left in the first quarter. Keenum went 5-of-7 for 54 yards on a 58-yard drive that ended with Latavius Murray's one-yard touchdown run, giving the Vikings a 17–0 lead.

New Orleans responded with a drive to the Vikings' 14-yard line, but lost their chance to score when Brees threw a pass that was tipped at the line by Everson Griffen and intercepted by linebacker Anthony Barr. Then after a punt, Brees led the team to the Minnesota 30-yard line. But after two incompletions, Brees was sacked by safety Harrison Smith for a 10-yard loss and Wil Lutz missed a 58-yard field goal attempt with 26 seconds left in the half. The Vikings also got a field goal try before halftime, which resulted in Forbath missing from 49 yards out.

Minnesota took the opening kickoff and drove to the Saints' 30-yard line. However, in what turned out to be a crucial turning point, Keenum was sacked by Sheldon Rankins for a 10-yard loss on third down, pushing the team out of field goal range. New Orleans took the ball back and drove 80 yards in 12 plays, featuring a 23-yard reception by receiver Michael Thomas. Brees finished the drive with a 14-yard touchdown pass to Thomas, putting New Orleans on the board at 17–7. Then on the first play after the kickoff, Keenum threw a pass that was intercepted by rookie safety Marcus Williams, who returned it 12 yards to the Vikings' 30-yard line. New Orleans then drove for another touchdown, scoring on Brees' three-yard pass to Thomas that narrowed the gap to 17–14 with 13:09 left in the game.

Minnesota responded with a seven-play, 44-yard drive that included a 27-yard completion from Keenum to Wright and ended on Forbath's 49-yard field goal that increased the Vikings' lead to 20–14. Furthermore, Saints coach Sean Payton lost two timeouts on the drive as a result of failed replay challenges. After forcing the Saints to punt, the Vikings ran the clock under six minutes before having to kick the ball back to New Orleans. Saints lineman George Johnson blocked the punt, enabling his team to take over on the Vikings' 40-yard line. From there, Brees completed four consecutive passes, the last one a 14-yard touchdown completion to running back Alvin Kamara, giving them their first lead of the game at 21–20 with 3:01 left. Undaunted, the Vikings stormed back, mainly on the strength of a 24-yard Adam Thielen reception, moving the ball to the Saints 35-yard line, where Forbath made a 53-yard field goal that gave the team a 23–21 lead with 1:29 remaining. Brees was able to answer, throwing an 18-yard pass to tight end Josh Hill, an 11-yard pass to Ted Ginn Jr. and a 13-yard completion to Willie Snead on fourth-and-10. Minnesota eventually halted the drive on their own 25-yard line, where Lutz kicked a 43-yard field goal.

The Vikings were now down 24–23 with 25 seconds and one timeout left. After a touchback and a false start penalty put the ball on the 20-yard line, Keenum completed a 19-yard pass to Diggs on the 39-yard line, where the team promptly called their last timeout. Following two incomplete passes, they faced 3rd and 10 with 10 seconds left. On the next play, Keenum threw a deep pass near the right sideline to Diggs, who made a leaping catch near the Saints' 35-yard line. Williams was in front of Diggs when he made the catch, but while trying to make a tackle, he completely missed Diggs and instead collided with Crawley (his own teammate and the other defender in range), leaving the receiver with no one around him. Diggs nearly fell over at this point, but was able to stay on his feet by using his off-hand and stay in bounds as he ran all the way to the end zone for a 61-yard touchdown completion to give the Vikings a 29–24 win. After several minutes of pandemonium, the Vikings knelt on the extra point try to close out the victory.

Keenum completed 25 of 40 passes for 318 yards, a touchdown and an interception. Diggs was the game's leading receiver with six receptions for 137 yards and a touchdown. Like Keenum, Brees also finished the game 25-of-40, but for 294 yards, three touchdowns and two interceptions. Kamara rushed for 43 yards, while also catching six passes for 72 yards and a touchdown.

== Conference championships ==
=== Sunday, January 21, 2018 ===
==== AFC: New England Patriots 24, Jacksonville Jaguars 20 ====
Jacksonville Jaguars vs. New England Patriots – Game summary

Quarter	1	2	3	4	Total
Jaguars	0	14	3	3	20
Patriots	3	7	0	14	24

at Gillette Stadium, Foxborough, Massachusetts

- Date: January 21, 2018
- Game time: 3:05 p.m. EST
- Game weather: Clear and cool, 48 °F (9 °C)
- Game attendance: 65,878
- Referee: Clete Blakeman
- TV announcers (CBS): Jim Nantz (play-by-play), Tony Romo (color commentator), Tracy Wolfson and Jay Feely (sideline reporters)
- Recap, Game Book

Game information

First quarter

- NE – Stephen Gostkowski 31-yard field goal, 9:21. Patriots 3–0. Drive: 10 plays, 62 yards, 5:39.

Second quarter

- JAX – Marcedes Lewis 4-yard pass from Blake Bortles (Josh Lambo kick), 14:15. Jaguars 7–3. Drive: 7 plays, 76 yards, 3:36.
- JAX – Leonard Fournette 4-yard run (Josh Lambo kick), 7:06. Jaguars 14–3. Drive: 10 plays, 77 yards, 6:07.
- NE – James White 1-yard run (Stephen Gostkowski kick), 0:55. Jaguars 14–10. Drive: 6 plays, 85 yards, 1:07.

Third quarter

- JAX – Josh Lambo 54-yard field goal, 10:23. Jaguars 17–10. Drive: 9 plays, 39 yards, 4:37.

Fourth quarter

- JAX – Josh Lambo 43-yard field goal, 14:52. Jaguars 20–10. Drive: 11 plays, 66 yards, 4:49.
- NE – Danny Amendola 9-yard pass from Tom Brady (Stephen Gostkowski kick), 8:44. Jaguars 20–17. Drive: 8 plays, 85 yards, 3:19.
- NE – Danny Amendola 4-yard pass from Tom Brady (Stephen Gostkowski kick), 2:48. Patriots 24–20. Drive: 5 plays, 30 yards, 2:10.

Top passers

- JAX – Blake Bortles – 23/36, 293 yards, TD
- NE – Tom Brady – 26/38, 290 yards, 2 TD

Top rushers

- JAX – Leonard Fournette – 24 rushes, 76 yards, TD
- NE – Dion Lewis – 9 rushes, 34 yards

Top receivers

- JAX – Allen Hurns – 6 receptions, 80 yards
- NE – Danny Amendola – 7 receptions, 84 yards, 2 TD

This was the first conference championship game to feature a team from Florida in 15 years (the Super Bowl XXXVII champion Tampa Bay Buccaneers won the 2002 NFC championship Game). New England overcame a 10-point deficit in the fourth quarter to earn the franchise's 10th Super Bowl appearance.

On the opening drive of the game, Patriots quarterback Tom Brady completed a 31-yard pass to Brandin Cooks and a 20-yard pass to wide receiver Danny Amendola as the team drove 62 yards in 10 plays to score on Stephen Gostkowski's 31-yard field goal. Following a pair of punts, Jacksonville quarterback Blake Bortles completed two passes to running back Corey Grant for 44 total yards as the team drove 76 yards in seven plays to take a 7–3 lead on a four-yard touchdown pass to tight end Marcedes Lewis on the second play of the second quarter. The next time they got the ball, Bortles completed all four pass attempts for 47 yards, one of them a 27-yard completion to Allen Hurns, as the team drove 77 yards in 10 plays to score on Leonard Fournette's four-yard touchdown run, increasing their lead to 14–3.

On the Jaguars' next drive, they moved the ball on the Patriots' 47-yard line. Bortles completed a 12-yard pass to Lewis that would have picked up a first down, but the team was flagged for a delay of game and Bortles was sacked by Adam Butler on the next play. New England got the ball on their own 15-yard line with 2:02 left in the half and proceeded to drive 85 yards in six plays – 47 yards from Jaguars penalties – to score on James White's 1-yard touchdown run, cutting the score to 14–10. However, Jacksonville safety Barry Church delivered a helmet-to-helmet hit on Patriots tight end Rob Gronkowski. Church drew a 15-yard penalty and Gronkowski was escorted off for medical testing that determined that he had suffered a concussion. Jacksonville got the ball back with 55 seconds and all three timeouts remaining, but chose to run out the clock and go to halftime, a choice that later earned them criticism, as no team had deliberately run the first half clock out with more than 50 seconds left during the season.

Jacksonville received the second half kickoff and drove 39 yards in nine plays, with 20 yards from a reception by fullback Tommy Bohanon. Josh Lambo finished the drive with a 54-yard field goal, increasing his team's lead to 17–10. Later in the period, the Jaguars advanced 66 yards in 11 plays, including 18 yards on a completion from Bortles to Marqise Lee on third-and-3. On the second play of the fourth quarter, Lambo scored with a 43-yard field goal, making the score 20–10. The game seemed to be slipping away from New England, particularly on their ensuing drive when linebacker Myles Jack forced and recovered a fumble from Dion Lewis on a trick play in which Amendola completed a forward pass to Lewis on the Jacksonville 33-yard line and Jack was ruled down by contact, nullifying what would have been a Jaguars touchdown. The New England defense subsequently forced a three-and-out. Taking the ball back on the Patriots' 15-yard line, Brady started the drive with an 18-yard pass to Cooks and then converted a third-and-18 with a 21-yard completion to Amendola on the 46-yard line. From there, Brady completed passes to Phillip Dorsett for 31 yards and Amendola for 14 yards before finishing the drive with a nine-yard touchdown pass to Amendola, making the score 20–17.

Following a pair of punts, Ryan Allen's 35-yard kick pinned the Jaguars back at their own 10-yard line. The Jaguars lost one yard over their next three plays, before Amendola returned Brad Nortman's 41-yard punt 20 yards to the Jacksonville 30-yard line with 4:58 left. From there, New England drove 30 yards in five plays, scoring on Brady's four-yard touchdown pass to Amendola to take a 24–20 lead with 2:48 left. After taking the ball back, Bortles' 29-yard completion to Dede Westbrook gave the Jaguars a first down on the Patriots' 38-yard line. But over the next two plays, Bortles threw an incompletion and then fumbled the ball while being sacked by linebacker Kyle Van Noy. Cam Robinson recovered the fumble, but the team lost nine yards on the play. After a four-yard pass to James O'Shaughnessy, Bortles' next pass was swatted away by Stephon Gilmore, causing a turnover on downs with 1:47 left. New England got a key first down on 3rd and long with an 18-yard run by Lewis that let them run out the clock.

Brady completed 26 of 38 passes for 290 yards and two touchdowns, Cooks was the top receiver of the game with six receptions for 100 yards, while Amendola caught seven passes for 84 yards and two touchdowns; he also returned two punts for 24 yards. Van Noy had nine tackles – including five solo tackles – a sack and a forced fumble. Bortles completed 23 of 36 passes for 293 yards and a touchdown, while Fournette was the leading rusher of the game with 76 yards and a touchdown and Hurns was the Jaguars' leading receiver with six receptions for 80 yards.

==== NFC: Philadelphia Eagles 38, Minnesota Vikings 7 ====
Minnesota Vikings vs. Philadelphia Eagles – Game summary

Quarter	1	2	3	4	Total
Vikings	7	0	0	0	7
Eagles	7	17	7	7	38

at Lincoln Financial Field, Philadelphia, Pennsylvania

- Date: January 21, 2018
- Game time: 6:40 p.m. EST
- Game weather: Cloudy, 47 °F (8 °C)
- Game attendance: 69,596
- Referee: Ed Hochuli
- TV announcers (Fox): Joe Buck (play-by-play), Troy Aikman (color commentator), Erin Andrews and Chris Myers (sideline reporters)
- Recap, Game Book

Game information

First quarter

- MIN – Kyle Rudolph 25-yard pass from Case Keenum (Kai Forbath kick), 10:14. Vikings 7–0. Drive: 9 plays, 75 yards, 4:46.
- PHI – Patrick Robinson 50-yard interception return (Jake Elliott kick), 6:26. Tied 7–7.

Second quarter

- PHI – LeGarrette Blount 11-yard run (Jake Elliott kick), 13:37. Eagles 14–7. Drive: 12 plays, 75 yards, 6:20.
- PHI – Alshon Jeffery 53-yard pass from Nick Foles (Jake Elliott kick), 1:09. Eagles 21–7. Drive: 7 plays, 76 yards, 2:07.
- PHI – Jake Elliott 38-yard field goal, 0:00. Eagles 24–7. Drive: 4 plays, 60 yards, 0:29.

Third quarter

- PHI – Torrey Smith 41-yard pass from Nick Foles (Jake Elliott kick), 10:05. Eagles 31–7. Drive: 8 plays, 75 yards, 4:55.

Fourth quarter

- PHI – Alshon Jeffery 5-yard pass from Nick Foles (Jake Elliott kick), 14:10. Eagles 38–7. Drive: 12 plays, 92 yards, 7:11.

Top passers

- MIN – Case Keenum – 28/48, 271 yards, TD, 2 INT
- PHI – Nick Foles – 26/33, 352 yards, 3 TD

Top rushers

- MIN – Jerick McKinnon – 10 rushes, 40 yards
- PHI – Jay Ajayi – 18 rushes, 73 yards

Top receivers

- MIN – Jerick McKinnon – 11 receptions, 86 yards
- PHI – Zach Ertz – 8 receptions, 93 yards

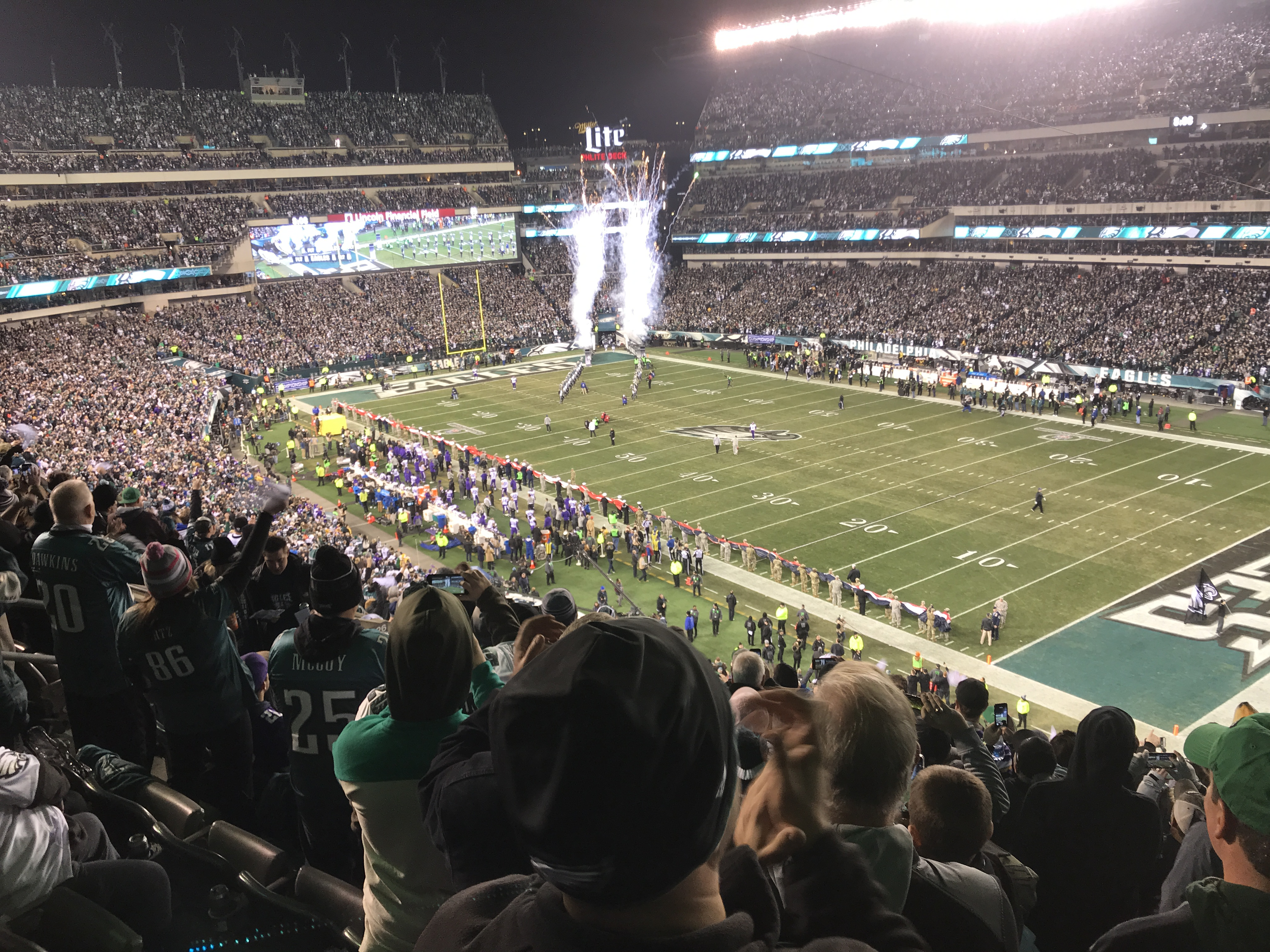
Lincoln Financial Field during the NFC championship game

This was the first time a Super Bowl host team had appeared in the conference championship. Although the Vikings scored with their opening drive, they were soon buried by Philadelphia, who racked up 456 total yards and 38 unanswered points. Meanwhile, the Vikings' eight remaining drives after their game-opening touchdown resulted in three punts, two interceptions, a lost fumble, and two turnovers on downs.

Minnesota drove 75 yards in 10 plays on their first possession, taking a 7–0 lead with Case Keenum's 25-yard touchdown pass to tight end Kyle Rudolph. The Eagles had to punt on their opening drive, but after moving the ball to the 43-yard line, Keenum threw a pass that was intercepted and returned 50 yards for a touchdown by cornerback Patrick Robinson, tying the game at 7–7. Following Robinson's pick-six, the Eagles began to take complete control of the game. After forcing a Vikings punt, Philadelphia drove 75 yards in 12 plays to take a 14–7 lead. Running back Jay Ajayi started the drive with two carries for 20 yards, while quarterback Nick Foles tossed a 11-yard completion to tight end Zach Ertz and running back LeGarrette Blount finished the drive with an 11-yard rushing score on the third play of the second quarter. Following an exchange of punts, the Vikings moved the ball to the Philadelphia 16-yard line, but on the next play, defensive end Derek Barnett strip-sacked Keenum, and defensive end Chris Long recovered the ball. The Eagles then drove 76 yards in seven plays, scoring on Foles' 53-yard touchdown pass to wide receiver Alshon Jeffery, increasing their lead to 21–7 with 3:16 left in the half. After forcing another Minnesota punt, the Eagles got the ball on their 20-yard line with 29 seconds on the clock. Foles started the drive with an 11-yard pass to Ajayi, who managed to get out of bounds, before throwing a 36-yard completion on Ertz on the Minnesota 33-yard line. On the next play, Foles' 13-yard completion to Ajayi moved the ball to the 20-yard line with four seconds left, where kicker Jake Elliott made a 38-yard field goal as time expired, making the score 24–7 at halftime.

The Eagles increased their lead to 31–7 less than five minutes into the second half, scoring with Foles' 41-yard touchdown pass to Torrey Smith on a flea flicker play. The Vikings responded with a drive on the Philadelphia 7-yard line, which featured a 33-yard completion from Keenum to wide receiver Jarius Wright and two receptions by running back Jerick McKinnon for 24 yards. After three incomplete passes, Keenum threw a pass to wide receiver Adam Thielen that was initially ruled a touchdown, but overturned to an incomplete pass after instant replay showed the ball had hit the ground, causing a turnover on downs. Philadelphia took over and drove 92 yards in 12 plays, including a 42-yard completion from Foles to wide receiver Nelson Agholor. Foles finished the drive with a 5-yard touchdown pass to Jeffery on the second play of the fourth quarter, capping off the scoring at 38–7. The Vikings had only two drives in the final quarter, one of them ending with a turnover on downs and another with an interception by Eagles safety Corey Graham.

Foles completed 26 of 33 passes for 352 yards and three touchdowns, Ertz was the leading receiver of the game with eight receptions for 93 yards, while Jeffery caught five passes for 85 yards and two touchdowns. Ajayi rushed 18 times for 73 yards and caught three passes for 26 yards. Keenum finished the game 28-of-48 for 271 yards and a touchdown, with two interceptions, while McKinnon was the Vikings' leading rusher with 10 runs for 40 yards and their leading receiver with 11 receptions for 86 yards.

This was the final game of referee Ed Hochuli's 28-year career.

In the days leading up to the game, Vikings fans were seen performing the "Skol!" chant around various Philadelphia landmarks, such as the steps of the Philadelphia Museum of Art, where they also draped the statue of Rocky Balboa with Vikings colors. Following Jeffery's touchdown in the fourth quarter, Eagles fans mocked the "Skol!" chant by imitating the hand gesture and replacing "Skol!" with "Foles!" in the chant.

This was the fourth playoff meeting between the Eagles and Vikings, with the Eagles remaining unbeaten in the playoffs against the Vikings.

== Super Bowl LII: Philadelphia Eagles 41, New England Patriots 33 ==
Philadelphia Eagles vs. New England Patriots – Game summary

Quarter	1	2	3	4	Total
Eagles	9	13	7	12	41
Patriots	3	9	14	7	33

at U.S. Bank Stadium, Minneapolis, Minnesota

- Date: February 4, 2018
- Game time: 6:30 p.m. EST/5:30 p.m. CST
- Game weather: Played indoors (domed stadium)
- Game attendance: 67,612
- Referee: Gene Steratore
- TV announcers (NBC): Al Michaels (play-by-play), Cris Collinsworth (analyst), Michele Tafoya (sideline reporter)
- Recap, Game Book

Game information

First quarter

- PHI – Jake Elliott 25-yard field goal, 7:55. Eagles 3–0. Drive: 14 plays, 67 yards, 7:05.
- NE – Stephen Gostkowski 26-yard field goal, 4:17. Tied 3–3. Drive: 9 plays, 67 yards, 3:38.
- PHI – Alshon Jeffery 34-yard pass from Nick Foles (kick failed, wide right), 2:34. Eagles 9–3. Drive: 3 plays, 77 yards, 1:43.

Second quarter

- PHI – LeGarrette Blount 21-yard run (pass failed), 8:48. Eagles 15–3. Drive: 6 plays, 65 yards, 3:05.
- NE – Stephen Gostkowski 45-yard field goal, 7:24. Eagles 15–6. Drive: 5 plays, 48 yards, 1:24.
- NE – James White 26-yard run (kick failed, wide left), 2:04. Eagles 15–12. Drive: 7 plays, 90 yards, 2:57.
- PHI – Nick Foles 1-yard pass from Trey Burton (Jake Elliott kick), 0:34. Eagles 22–12. Drive: 7 plays, 70 yards, 1:30.

Third quarter

- NE – Rob Gronkowski 5-yard pass from Tom Brady (Stephen Gostkowski kick), 12:15. Eagles 22–19. Drive: 8 plays, 75 yards, 2:45.
- PHI – Corey Clement 22-yard pass from Nick Foles (Jake Elliott kick), 7:18. Eagles 29–19. Drive: 11 plays, 85 yards, 4:57.
- NE – Chris Hogan 26-yard pass from Tom Brady (Stephen Gostkowski kick), 3:23. Eagles 29–26. Drive: 7 plays, 75 yards, 3:55.

Fourth quarter

- PHI – Jake Elliott 42-yard field goal, 14:09. Eagles 32–26. Drive: 8 plays, 51 yards, 4:14.
- NE – Rob Gronkowski 4-yard pass from Tom Brady (Stephen Gostkowski kick), 9:22. Patriots 33–32. Drive: 10 plays, 75 yards, 4:47.
- PHI – Zach Ertz 11-yard pass from Nick Foles (pass failed), 2:21. Eagles 38–33. Drive: 14 plays, 75 yards, 7:01.
- PHI – Jake Elliott 46-yard field goal, 1:05. Eagles 41–33. Drive: 4 plays, 4 yards, 1:04.

Top passers

- PHI – Nick Foles – 28/43, 373 yards, 3 TD, INT
- NE – Tom Brady – 28/48, 505 yards, 3 TD

Top rushers

- PHI – LeGarrette Blount – 14 rushes, 90 yards, TD
- NE – James White – 7 rushes, 45 yards, TD

Top receivers

- PHI – Nelson Agholor – 9 receptions, 84 yards
- NE – Rob Gronkowski – 9 receptions, 116 yards, 2 TD

This was the second Super Bowl meeting between the Patriots and the Eagles. Their first Super Bowl meeting was in Super Bowl XXXIX, 13 years earlier.

== Television coverage ==
All playoff games were broadcast nationally on network television.

ABC and ESPN simulcast one AFC wild card game, while CBS broadcast all the other AFC playoff games. Coverage of the NFC Wild Card and Divisional rounds was split between Fox and NBC, with each network having coverage of one game in each of those two rounds. CBS had exclusive coverage of the AFC Championship Game. Fox had exclusive coverage of the NFC Championship Game. NBC had exclusive coverage of Super Bowl LII.
