= Hasson Heights, Pennsylvania =

Unincorporated community in Pennsylvania, US

Hasson Heights is a census-designated place (CDP) in Cornplanter Township, Pennsylvania, United States. The population was 1,351 at the 2010 census.

== Geography ==
Hasson Heights is located at 41°26′36″N 79°40′55″W. Locally, it is considered to be the area atop the hills above the "North Side" of Oil City, the northern half of the city as divided by the Allegheny River.

According to the United States Census Bureau, the CDP has a total area of 1.5 square miles (3.9 km^{2}), all land.

== Demographics ==
Historical population
Census	Pop.	Note	%±
1990	1,610		—
2000	1,495		−7.1%
2010	1,351		−9.6%
2020	1,229		−9.0%

As of the census of 2000, there were 1,495 people, 593 households, and 447 families residing in the CDP. The population density was 978.1 inhabitants per square mile (377.6/km^{2}). There were 609 housing units at an average density of 398.4 per square mile (153.8/km^{2}). The racial makeup of the CDP was 98.33% White, 0.60% African American, 0.07% Native American, 0.07% from other races, and 0.94% from two or more races. Hispanic or Latino of any race were 0.54% of the population.

There were 593 households, out of which 32.5% had children under the age of 18 living with them, 63.2% were married couples living together, 8.3% had a female householder with no husband present, and 24.6% were non-families. 22.9% of all households were made up of individuals, and 12.5% had someone living alone who was 65 years of age or older. The average household size was 2.52 and the average family size was 2.92.

In the CDP, the population was spread out, with 26.8% under the age of 18, 4.7% from 18 to 24, 24.5% from 25 to 44, 26.0% from 45 to 64, and 18.0% who were 65 years of age or older. The median age was 42 years. For every 100 females, there were 92.9 males. For every 100 females age 18 and over, there were 88.5 males.

The median income for a household in the CDP was $37,986, and the median income for a family was $49,375. Males had a median income of $39,632 versus $24,773 for females. The per capita income for the CDP was $20,088. About 7.0% of families and 7.9% of the population were below the poverty line, including 11.8% of those under age 18 and 4.4% of those age 65 or over.

== Education ==
It is in the Oil City Area School District.
