= Oil City Area School District =

School district in Pennsylvania

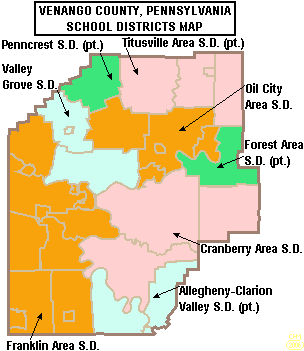

Address
- 825 Grandview Road Oil City, Venango County, Pennsylvania, 16301; United States

District information
- Type: Public

Students and staff
- District mascot: Oil Derrick

Other information
- Website: www.ocasd.org

The Oil City Area School District is a midsized, rural public school district in Venango County, Pennsylvania and including Oil City, the borough of Rouseville, Oakland and Cornplanter townships, and a portion of President Township. It also covers the Hasson Heights census-designated place. The district covers approximately 71.4 square miles (185 km^{2}) in central Venango County.

According to 2000 federal census data, the district serves a resident population of 16,270. In 2009, the district residents' per capita income was $15,503, while the median family income was $38,401. In the Commonwealth, the median family income was $49,501 and the United States median family income was $49,445, in 2010. In 2006, the 2,122 student population was 96% white, 3% black, < 0.5% Asian, Native American < 0.5% and 1% Hispanic.

The district operates three elementary schools, Hasson Heights, Seventh Street, and Smedley Street, one middle school, and one high school.
