= James O'Shaughnessy (American football) =

American football player (born 1992)

Chicago Bears
- Position: Scouting assistant

Personal information
- Born: January 14, 1992 (age 34); Naperville, Illinois, U.S.
- Listed height: 6 ft 4 in (1.93 m)
- Listed weight: 245 lb (111 kg)

Career information
- High school: Naperville North
- College: Illinois State
- NFL draft: 2015: 5th round, 173rd overall pick

Career history
- Kansas City Chiefs (2015–2016); New England Patriots (2017)*; Jacksonville Jaguars (2017–2021); Chicago Bears (2022)*; Minnesota Vikings (2022)*
- * Offseason or practice squad member only

Career NFL statistics
- Receptions: 112
- Receiving yards: 1,108
- Receiving touchdowns: 3
- Stats at Pro Football Reference

James O'Shaughnessy (born January 14, 1992) is an American former professional football tight end who currently serves as a scouting assistant for the Chicago Bears. He was selected by the Kansas City Chiefs in the fifth round of the 2015 NFL draft with the 173rd overall pick. He played college football for the Illinois State Redbirds from 2010 to 2014.

== Professional career ==
Pre-draft measurables
Height	Weight	Arm length	Hand span	40-yard dash	10-yard split	20-yard split	20-yard shuttle	Three-cone drill	Vertical jump	Broad jump	Bench press
6 ft 4 1/4 in (1.94 m)	248 lb (112 kg)	32 1/8 in (0.82 m)	9 3/4 in (0.25 m)	4.68 s	1.61 s	2.71 s	4.38 s	7.20 s	35.0 in (0.89 m)	9 ft 8 in (2.95 m)	16 reps
All values from Pro Day

=== Kansas City Chiefs ===
O'Shaughnessy was selected by the Kansas City Chiefs in the fifth round, 173rd overall, in the 2015 NFL draft. During O'Shaughnessy's two years in Kansas City, he recorded eight receptions for 86 yards.

=== New England Patriots ===
On April 29, 2017, the Chiefs traded O'Shaughnessy and a sixth-round selection in the 2017 NFL draft to the New England Patriots for a fifth-round selection. He was released by the Patriots on September 2.

=== Jacksonville Jaguars ===
On September 3, 2017, O'Shaughnessy was claimed off waivers by the Jacksonville Jaguars. On September 10, in his Jaguars debut, O'Shaughnessy had one reception for 18 yards in a 29–7 victory over the Houston Texans. In Week 16 against the San Francisco 49ers, he had five receptions for 39 receiving yards and a receiving touchdown. He finished with 14 receptions for 149 receiving yards and one receiving touchdown.

In the 2018 season, O'Shaughnessy finished with 24 receptions for 214 receiving yards.

On March 21, 2019, O'Shaughnessy re-signed with the Jaguars. In Week 5, against the Carolina Panthers, O’Shaughnessy suffered a torn ACL and was ruled out for the rest of the season. He finished with 14 receptions for 153 receiving yards and two receiving touchdowns. He was placed on the active/physically unable to perform list by the Jaguars at the start of training camp on August 1, 2020. He was moved back to the active roster on August 12.

O'Shaughnessy re-signed with the Jaguars on March 17, 2021. He was placed on injured reserve on September 22, after suffering an ankle injury in Week 2. He was activated on November 27.

=== Chicago Bears ===
On April 18, 2022, O'Shaughnessy signed with the Chicago Bears. He was released by the Bears on August 30.

=== Minnesota Vikings ===
On November 14, 2022, O'Shaughnessy was signed to the practice squad of the Minnesota Vikings.

== NFL career statistics ==
Legend
**Bold**	Career high

=== Regular season ===
Year	Team	GP	GS	Receiving							Fumbles	
Year	Team	GP	GS	Rec	Tgt	Yds	Avg	Lng	TD	FD	Fum	Lost
2015	KC	7	3	6	9	87	**14.5**	30	0	4	0	0
2016	KC	16	3	2	3	−1	−0.5	0	0	0	0	0
2017	JAX	16	1	14	24	149	10.6	29	1	9	0	0
2018	JAX	14	9	24	**38**	214	8.9	17	0	10	0	0
2019	JAX	5	5	14	20	153	10.9	**35**	**2**	7	0	0
2020	JAX	15	13	**28**	**38**	**262**	9.4	26	0	**12**	0	0
2021	JAX	7	6	24	34	244	10.2	30	0	10	0	0
Total		80	40	112	166	1,108	9.9	35	3	52	0	0

=== Postseason ===
Year	Team	Games		Receiving					Fumbles	
Year	Team	GP	GS	Rec	Yds	Avg	Lng	TD	Fum	Lost
2016	KC	1	0	0	0	0.0	0	0	0	0
2017	JAX	3	2	**2**	**23**	**11.5**	**19**	0	0	0
Career		4	2	2	23	11.5	19	0	0	0
